= List of The Bold Ones episodes =

This is a list of all episodes of The Bold Ones.

== Season One (1969-70) ==
Series Title	Episode Title	Original air date
The New Doctors	"To Save a Life"	September 14, 1969
The Lawyers	"A Game of Chance"	September 21, 1969
The Protectors	"A Case of Good Whiskey at Christmas Time"	September 28, 1969
The New Doctors	"What's the Price of a Pair of Eyes?"	October 5, 1969
The Lawyers	"The People Against Ortega"	October 12, 1969
The New Doctors	"Rebellion of the Body"	October 19, 1969
The Protectors	"If I Should Wake Before I Die"	October 26, 1969
The Lawyers	"The Crowd Pleaser"	November 2, 1969
The New Doctors	"Man Without a Heart"	November 9, 1969
The Lawyers	"Rockford Riddle"	November 16, 1969
The New Doctors	"A Small Step for Man"	November 23, 1969
The Lawyers	"Shriek of Silence"	November 30, 1969
The New Doctors	"Crisis"	December 7, 1969
The Protectors	"Draw a Straight Man"	December 14, 1969
The New Doctors	"And Those Unborn"	December 21, 1969
The Lawyers	"Trial of a Mafioso"	January 4, 1970
The Protectors	"The Carrier"	January 11, 1970
The New Doctors	"If I Can't Sing, I'll Listen"	January 18, 1970
The Lawyers	"Point of Honor"	January 25, 1970
The Protectors	"A Thing Not of God"	February 1, 1970
The New Doctors	"This Day's Child"	February 8, 1970
The Lawyers	"The Shattered Image"	February 15, 1970
The New Doctors	"Dark Is the Rainbow, Loud the Silence"	March 1, 1970
The Protectors	"Memo from the Class of '76"	March 8, 1970

== Season Two (1970-71) ==
Series Title	Episode Title	Original air date
The Senator	"To Taste of Death But Once"	September 13, 1970
The New Doctors	"This Will Really Kill You"	September 20, 1970
The Lawyers	"The Verdict"	September 27, 1970
The Senator	"The Day the Lion Died"	October 4, 1970
The New Doctors	"Killer on the Loose"	October 11, 1970
The Lawyers	"Panther in a Cage"	October 18, 1970
The New Doctors	"Giants Never Kneel"	October 25, 1970
The Senator	"Power Play"	November 1, 1970
The Lawyers	"Trial of a Pfc."	November 8, 1970
The New Doctors	"First: No Harm to the Patient"	November 15, 1970
The Senator	"A Continual Roar of Musketry: Part 1"	November 22, 1970
The Senator	"A Continual Roar of Musketry: Part 2"	November 29, 1970
The Lawyers	"The People Against Dr. Chapman"	December 6, 1970
The New Doctors	"In Dreams They Run"	December 13, 1970
The Lawyers	"The Loneliness Racket"	December 20, 1970
The New Doctors	"A Matter of Priorities"	January 3, 1971
The Lawyers	"The Search for Leslie Grey"	January 10, 1971
The Senator	"Someday They'll Elect a President"	January 17, 1971
The New Doctors	"An Absence of Loneliness"	January 24, 1971
The Lawyers	"The Hyland Confession"	January 31, 1971
The Senator	"George Washington Is a Liar"	February 7, 1971
The New Doctors	"Tender Predator"	February 14, 1971
The Lawyers	"The Price of Justice"	February 21, 1971
The Senator	"A Single Blow of the Sword"	February 28, 1971

== Season Three (1971-72) ==
Series Title	Episode Title	Original air date
The New Doctors	"Broken Melody"	September 19, 1971
The Lawyers	"The Invasion of Kevin Ireland"	September 26, 1971
The New Doctors	"The Angry Man"	October 3, 1971
The Lawyers	"The Strange Secret of Yermo Hill"	October 17, 1971
The New Doctors	"One Lonely Step"	October 24, 1971
The Lawyers	"Hall of Justice"	October 31, 1971
The New Doctors	"Close Up"	November 7, 1971
The Lawyers	"In Defense of Ellen McKay"	November 14, 1971
The New Doctors	"The Convicts"	November 21, 1971
The Lawyers	"By Reason of Insanity"	November 28, 1971
The New Doctors	"The Glass Cage"	December 5, 1971
The Lawyers	"Justice Is a Sometime Thing"	December 12, 1971
The New Doctors	"Dagger in the Mind"	December 19, 1971
The Lawyers	"The Letter of the Law"	December 26, 1971
The New Doctors	"Moment of Crisis"	January 2, 1972
The Lawyers	"The Long Morning After: Part 1"	January 9, 1972
The Lawyers	"The Long Morning After: Part 2"	January 16, 1972
The New Doctors	"Short Flight to a Distant Star"	January 23, 1972
The Lawyers	"In Sudden Darkness"	January 30, 1972
The New Doctors	"A Threatened Species"	February 6, 1972
The Lawyers	"Lisa, I Hardly Knew You"	February 13, 1972
The New Doctors	"Discovery at Fourteen"	March 5, 1972

== Season Four (1972-73) ==
Series Title	Episode Title	Original air date
The New Doctors	"Five Days in the Death of Sgt. Brown"	September 19, 1972
The New Doctors	"Is This Operation Necessary?"	September 26, 1972
The New Doctors	"A Nation of Human Pincushions"	October 3, 1972
The New Doctors	"Time Bomb in the Chest"	October 10, 1972
The New Doctors	"A Standard for Manhood"	October 17, 1972
The New Doctors	"A Substitute Womb"	October 24, 1972
The New Doctors	"A Very Strange Triangle"	October 31, 1972
The New Doctors	"A Quality of Fear"	November 14, 1972
The New Doctors	"An Inalienable Right to Die"	November 28, 1972
The New Doctors	"A Purge of Madness"	December 5, 1972
The New Doctors	"End Theme"	December 12, 1972
The New Doctors	"The Velvet Prison"	December 19, 1972
The New Doctors	"Terminal Career"	January 2, 1973
The New Doctors	"A Tightrope to Tomorrow"	January 9, 1973
The New Doctors	"The Night Crawler"	January 16, 1973
The New Doctors	"And Other Things I May Not See"	May 4, 1973

== See also ==
- The Bold Ones: The New Doctors
- The Bold Ones: The Lawyers
- The Bold Ones: The Protectors
- The Bold Ones: The Senator
