= List of The Bold Ones: The New Doctors episodes =

This is a list of episodes for the television series The Bold Ones: The New Doctors.

== Series overview ==
Season	Episodes	First aired	Last aired
1	10	September 14, 1969	March 1, 1970
2	8	September 20, 1970	February 14, 1971
3	11	September 21, 1971	March 5, 1972
4	16	September 19, 1972	May 4, 1973

== Episodes ==
=== Season 1 (1969–70) ===
No. overall	No. in season	Title	Directed by	Written by	Original release date
1	1	"To Save a Life"	Don McDougall	Irv Pearlberg	September 14, 1969
A young man is left brain dead after being involved in an automobile accident. The doctors at the Institute, who have a patient in grave need of a kidney transplant, walk a delicate line trying to convince the man's wife and the attending physician to end life support and allow the transplant before it is too late. Pat Hingle, Virginia Gregg and Michael Lerner guest star.
2	2	"What's the Price of a Pair of Eyes?"	Jeffrey Hayden	Sandy Stern	October 5, 1969
After being unable to secure adequate funding from Dr. Craig, Dr. Hunter and a determined biophysicist use their creativity and limited resources to successfully build a prototype of a "Tactile Vision Substitution System," a device that might give certain blind individuals a crude form of sight. Jason Evers and Tisha Sterling guest star.
3	3	"The Rebellion of the Body"	Daniel Petrie	Alfred Brenner	October 19, 1969
An accident in the Nuclear Research Center leaves Dr. Hunter and another injured. A piece of radioactive metal is lodged in Dr. Hunter, requiring the hospital to seal off an entire wing due to the danger of radiation poisoning. William Smithers and Shelly Novack guest star.
4	4	"Man Without a Heart"	Jack Starrett	Byron Bloch & Irve Tunick	November 9, 1969
The family of a deceased patient sues Dr. Stuart for malpractice because he allegedly made the decision to insert an experimental artificial heart without proper authorization. While harshly calling Dr. Stuart's character into question during the trial, the prosecuting attorney suffers a heart-related medical emergency, thrusting Dr. Stuart into a very awkward situation. Howard Duff, Joanna Cameron and John Zaremba guest star.
5	5	"One Small Step for Man"	Jack Starrett	Byron Bloch & Robert Pirosh	November 23, 1969
The Institute is selected by NASA to monitor the health of three astronauts, including the country's first black astronaut, before and during an Apollo Moon mission. When one of the astronauts suffers a mysterious medical emergency mid-flight, Dr. Stuart puts his own life at risk in order to diagnose the problem. Ted Hartley, Terry Carter and Yale Summers guest star.
6	6	"Crisis"	Don McDougall	Donn Mullally	December 7, 1969
Dr. Stuart develops a promising new "arterial rerouting" heart surgery procedure which works on a healthy chimp, but fails to save the first human patient it is used on. The setback causes Dr. Stuart to insist that further procedures be delayed until more research can be conducted, but faces pressure from multiple sources who do not want any further delay. Norma Crane and Bradford Dillman guest star.
7	7	"And Those Unborn"	Robert Day	Blanche Hanalis	December 21, 1969
A former girlfriend of Dr. Hunter with a history of miscarriages comes to the Institute with her husband to receive cutting edge genetic counseling and prenatal care. During their stay, her husband displays random bouts of increasingly strange and violent behavior, and Dr. Hunter is determined to find out why before it is too late. Stephen McNally and Lois Nettleton guest star.
8	8	"If I Can't Sing, I'll Listen"	Don Weis	Blanche Hanalis & Leonard Stadd	January 18, 1970
Three women who share a room at the Institute all face serious illnesses but have very different attitudes toward their prognosis and treatment. Dr. Stuart tries desperately to help one of them change her grim attitude toward treatable cancer before it's too late. Josephine Hutchinson, Hazel Scott and Lorraine Gary guest star.
9	9	"This Day's Child"	Jeffrey Hayden	Sandy Stern	February 8, 1970
A severely mentally handicapped girl suffers rapid liver failure after drinking poison, and the only treatment available to her is an experimental cross transfusion with her sister that could possibly kill them both. Bethel Leslie, Sandy Brown Wyeth and Sheila Larken guest star.
10	10	"Dark Is the Rainbow, Loud the Silence"	Barry Shear	Max Hodge	March 1, 1970
A high ranking government official begins exhibiting severe symptoms of schizophrenia and attempts to kill the President. Dr. Stuart, a personal friend of the man, fights to delay a Presidential order to institutionalize the man in Washington, D.C., while Dr. Hunter performs an experimental biochemical treatment at the Institute. Katherine Woodville, Ann Elder and Jack Klugman guest star.

=== Season 2 (1970–71) ===
No. overall	No. in season	Title	Directed by	Written by	Original release date
11	1	"This Will Really Kill You"	Jeffrey Hayden	Phyllis White & Robert White	September 20, 1970
A pregnant woman who is a heroin addict has her baby at the Institute. Tisha Sterling, Darby Hinton, John Lupton and Sandy Kenyon guest star.
12	2	"Killer on the Loose"	Abner Biberman	Reuben Bercovitch	October 11, 1970
The doctors feel helpless in combating an unknown African virus with no known cure that is quickly killing personnel on the 4th floor of the Institute. Della Reese, Georg Stanford Brown and Robert Hooks guest star.
13	3	"Giants Never Kneel"	Daryl Duke	Sy Salkowitz & Nat Tanchuck	October 25, 1970
Ainsley Walters, founder of a large public company under threat of hostile takeover, comes to the Institute for experimental treatment of Parkinson's disease. He offers Dr. Stuart a large grant to treat him in exchange for having his condition kept a secret. Arthur Hill, DeForest Kelley, Carol Lynley and Roger Perry guest star.
14	4	"First: No Harm to the Patient"	Jeffrey Hayden	Howard Browne & Sy Salkowitz	November 15, 1970
Dr. Stuart discovers a pattern of severely botched surgeries that were recently performed by a respected small-town doctor. He decides that he has a moral obligation to pursue disciplinary action against the doctor, only to find instead that the process might lead to the destruction of his own career. Richard Dreyfuss and James Broderick guest star.
15	5	"In Dreams They Run"	Jerry Lewis	Don Tait & Sandor Stern	December 13, 1970
This episode is about a young boy who has been diagnosed with muscular dystrophy and was directed by Jerry Lewis. Joanne Linville, Jason Karpf and Lincoln Kilpatrick guest star.
16	6	"A Matter of Priorities"	Leslie H. Martinson	Irv Pearlberg	January 3, 1971
Dr. Stuart reassesses his priorities, and convinces his colleagues at the Institute to do the same, after volunteering at a free clinic run by a doctor who chose to give up his very profitable Beverly Hills practice to help the poor. Kim Hunter, Pernell Roberts, Harold J. Stone and Linda Dangcil guest star.
17	7	"An Absence of Loneliness"	Joel Rogosin	Michael Blankfort, Robert Guy Barrows, Judith Barrows (serial sequence) & Joel Rogosin (story)	January 24, 1971
Dr. Craig diagnoses a close friend with having a terminal disease, and has to convince him to address his relationship with his son before it is too late. Meanwhile, Dr. Hunter falls in love with a young, up-and-coming actress who has come to the Institute for tests and finds himself unable to tell her the devastating diagnosis. Kathryn Hays, Phillip Pine and Coleen Gray guest star.
18	8	"Tender Predator"	Richard Benedict	Don Ingalls, Robert Guy Barrows, Judith Barrows (serial sequence) & Joel Rogosin (story)	February 14, 1971
A worker from Vista is admitted to the Craig Institute with symptoms of an unknown disease, as well as sights on an Institute physician. Karen Valentine, Kiel Martin, Katherine Crawford and Melissa Hart guest star.

=== Season 3 (1971–72) ===
No. overall	No. in season	Title	Directed by	Written by	Original release date
19	1	"Broken Melody"	Robert Scheerer	Adrian Scott	September 19, 1971
Two patients' lives intersect: a singer who is suffering from hearing loss; and a little boy who shows signs of having been battered though his parents deny it. Joyce Van Patten, Milton Selzer, Bobby Eilbacher and Ivor Francis guest star.
20	2	"Angry Man"	Alf Kjellin	Howard Dimsdale	October 3, 1971
A young, egotistical paramedic being trained at the Institute feels he has the same standing as the doctors due to his vast experience as a medic in the Vietnam War. Using stolen supplies from the Institute, he opens an underground clinic to treat the poor, putting Dr. Craig and the Institute at risk. Dina Merrill, Zooey Hall and Dabbs Greer guest star.
21	3	"One Lonely Step"	Leonard Horn	Edward J. Lakso	October 24, 1971
Dr. Craig is accused of racism after he cuts funding for a new serum developed by a black colleague to treat sickle-cell anemia and refuses to let Dr. Hunter use it on a young boy being treated at the Institute. Louis Gossett Jr., Pat Crowley, McLean Stevenson and Brian Tochi guest star.
22	4	"Close-Up"	Jeffrey Hayden	Phyllis White & Robert White	November 7, 1971
A model suffers from excruciating pain in her face and refuses to have the most common surgery for her condition (neurectomy), because she fears it will negatively impact her appearance. Instead, Dr. Stuart proposes implanting an electric stimulator which will stop her pain whenever it starts. But before he can implant it, his hands are severely burned in a lab fire. Joan Van Ark, Peggy Feury, Stan Schneider and Paul Gleason guest star.
23	5	"The Convicts"	John Newland	George Lefferts	November 21, 1971
The Institute uses four volunteers from the state prison system to perform extremely high-risk tests of a serum designed to reduce transplant rejection. One of the volunteers, a former medical student serving time for selling heroin, has an ulterior motive that will put everyone at the Institute in danger. Val Avery, Don Stroud and Loretta Swit guest star.
24	6	"The Glass Cage"	Arnold Laven	Stephen Kandel	December 5, 1971
Three people enter a new program at the Institute for treating and discovering the causes of alcoholism. Lynn Carlin, Frank Campanella, Brock Peters and Pat Hingle guest star.
25	7	"Dagger in the Mind"	Leonard Horn	Howard Dimsdale	December 19, 1971
A distinguished and dedicated medical professor, who abruptly gives up his career to become a playboy and marry a girl 30 years his junior, complains of pains that no one is able to diagnose. One of his former students, who happens be in treatment at the Institute for a newly diagnosed heart condition that will prevent her from pursuing her career, thinks she knows what's wrong with the professor and takes matters into her own hands... literally. Collin Wilcox, Jeff Pomerantz, Mary Layne and Robert Sterling guest star.
26	8	"Moment of Crisis"	Michael Caffey	George Lefferts	January 2, 1972
Dr. Hunter's girlfriend, frustrated that he's still not ready to marry her, drives away from their dinner engagement in a rage, causing a bus full of children to swerve off the road and crash. The injuries push the Institute to its limits, and cause a standoff with possible life-and-death consequences between Dr. Craig and the doctor who is seeking to replace him as head of the Institute. Lloyd Bochner, Athena Lorde and Edward Andrews guest star.
27	9	"Short Flight to a Distant Star"	Arnold Laven	Howard Dimsdale	January 23, 1972
Sharon's boastful father Mike is severely injured in a shooting. With a bullet fragment dangerously floating in Mike's brain, Dr. Hunter and Dr. Stuart look to NASA technology to save the patient's life. Cameron Mitchell, Ted Gehring and Jess Walton guest star.
28	10	"A Threatened Species"	John Badham	Jack Guss & Gabrielle Upton	February 6, 1972
A 37-year-old resident nurse at the Institute, who was recently abandoned by her free-spirited husband, gives birth to a premature baby with a heart defect. When her 10-year-old daughter overhears that she doesn't want to save the baby, Dr. Stuart has to intervene before psychological damage is done. Norma Crane, Clu Gulager, Victoria Racimo and Dawn Frame guest star.
29	11	"Discovery at Fourteen"	Don Taylor	Robert Malcolm Young	March 5, 1972
Dr. Amanda Fallon (Jane Wyman) tries to help a teenage boy (Ron Howard) who develops severe physical and psychological problems after discovering his father is a homosexual and believing it's hereditary. This episode was an unsold pilot starring Wyman and Mike Farrell (M*A*S*H). Jim Davis and Mary Grace Canfield also star.

=== Season 4 (1972–73) ===
No. overall	No. in season	Title	Directed by	Written by	Original release date
30	1	"Five Days in the Death of Sgt. Brown: Part II"	Leonard Horn	Robert I. Holt & Robert Van Scoyk	September 19, 1972
This is the second half of a two-part crossover with Ironside. After being shot and paralyzed, Sgt. Ed Brown (Don Galloway) decides to go through with a surgical procedure that will hopefully restore mobility to his legs. However, a complication arises when the daughter of Dr. Ritter, the man who will be performing the surgery, is kidnapped by someone who was hired by the person who wants to see Ed dead. Vic Morrow and Christina Hart guest star.
31	2	"Is This Operation Necessary?"	John Badham	Ken Kolb	September 26, 1972
An aging gynecologist is accused by Dr. Hunter of performing unnecessary operations. Dr. McLain (Richard Basehart), the besieged doctor, is promoting lakeside property investments which require substantial capital. Dr. Craig, a long time friend of Dr. McLain, defends the renown surgeon until it becomes evident that his practice must come to an end. Dorothy Malone and Vic Tayback guest star.
32	3	"A Nation of Human Pincushions"	John Badham	Robert L. Collins & Robert Schlitt	October 3, 1972
Dr. Craig invites an acupuncture expert to the Institute to give a symposium and provide treatment to patients with chronic pain. Although the expert is able to provide instant relief to most of the patients, he faces stiff skepticism from the medical establishment because he lacks formal medical training, happens to be a communist, and expresses an interest in attempting acupuncture on internal organs. Carl Reiner, Jack Albertson and Lloyd Nolan guest star.
33	4	"Time Bomb in the Chest"	Daryl Duke	Charles McDaniel	October 10, 1972
The Institute's Chief of Medical Design suffers a mild heart attack while having difficulty completing the prototype of a "Quantitative Cardiac Radioisotope Counter." As he makes what is an otherwise normal recovery, he becomes obsessed with his own mortality, causing him to lose focus and neglect his wife and young son. John Vernon, Joanne Linville and Michael C. Gwynne guest star.
34	5	"A Standard of Manhood"	Daryl Duke	Robert L. Collins	October 17, 1972
A friend of Dr. Hunter's confides that he has recently become impotent, which has caused him to become increasingly violent to compensate for his lost sense of manhood, making his wife think he is having an affair. The doctors discover and remove a small brain tumor, but they quickly learn they are far from solving his real problem, which could destroy more than just his marriage. Frank Converse, Shirley Knight and Dabney Coleman guest star.
35	6	"A Substitute Womb"	Richard Donner	Oliver Crawford & Lionel E. Siegel	October 24, 1972
A woman who has already miscarried twice now faces having an abortion to save her life. As an alternative, Dr. Hunter suggests transplanting her embryo into another woman, which has never been tried in a human before. Her younger sister quickly agrees to volunteer, but the ethical questions surrounding the process threaten both the Institute and the sisters' relationship. Stefanie Powers, Sheila Larken and Carl Betz guest star.
36	7	"A Very Strange Triangle"	Jeremy Kagan	Peggy O'Shea	October 31, 1972
Dr. Cohen (Robert Walden) attempts to rekindle a relationship with a former girlfriend (Donna Mills) who has just been hired as a nurse at the Institute. To his shock, he finds out she is now in a homosexual relationship with another woman (Hildy Brooks) but thinks she still might have feelings for him. Jo Ann Harris also guest stars.
37	8	"A Quality of Fear"	Richard Donner	Jeff Myrow	November 14, 1972
To test a new theory on encouraging improved quality and length of life of terminal cancer patients, Dr. Hunter takes on a bluntly honest, and at times forceful, demeanor when dealing with patients who resist treatment and want to give up. When the approach seems to backfire with several of the patients, he begins doubting his own abilities. Marlyn Mason, Richard Anderson and Herb Edelman guest star.
38	9	"An Inalienable Right to Die"	Walter Doniger	Gustave Field & Robert Van Scoyk	November 28, 1972
A newspaper reporter in the prime of her life is paralyzed from the neck down in a boating accident. Despite initially being told she has no hope for recovery, she is accepted to a specialized rehabilitation program at the Institute. However, the circumstances surrounding the decision cause her to rethink her options. Susan Clark, Robert Foxworth and Stephen R. Hudis guest star.
39	10	"A Purge of Madness"	Marvin J. Chomsky	Lionel E. Siegel	December 5, 1972
A dedicated teacher suffers from random, extremely violent outbursts which he has no control over. After all traditional therapies are unable to help, Dr. Craig reluctantly suggests an experimental psycho-surgery that critics compare to a lobotomy. Milton Berle, L. Q. Jones, Mariette Hartley and Ross Martin guest star.
40	11	"Endtheme"	John Badham	Larry Brody & Lionel E. Siegel	December 12, 1972
The life of a popular singer has been a roller coaster of emotions that could lead to suicide. Don Johnson, Clu Gulager and Lane Bradbury guest star.
41	12	"The Velvet Prison"	Richard Donner	Ron Bishop & Arnold Somkin	December 19, 1972
A story about a child who has hemophilia and requires surgery, and the risks involved. Diana Muldaur, Charles Cioffi and Gene Andrusco guest star.
42	13	"A Terminal Career"	Joel Oliansky	Charles McDaniel & Alvin Sapinsley	January 2, 1973
Dr. Hunter's most recent girlfriend, a resident at the Institute who is on the verge of obtaining her license, has an intense fear of dealing with patients which is obvious in her very poor bedside manner. When she is tasked with informing a patient that he is in the initial stages of ALS, she is forced to ask herself if she really has what it takes to be a doctor. Susan Howard, Michael Constantine and Ida Lupino guest star.
43	14	"Tightrope to Tomorrow"	John Newland	Ken Kolb	January 9, 1973
Four candidates experiencing chest pains undergo stringent tests for a bold new heart procedure to relieve their pain: Coronary bypass surgery. William Shatner, Barra Grant and Alfred Ryder guest star.
44	15	"The Night Crawler"	Richard Donner	Robert Van Scoyk	January 16, 1973
Unsold pilot unconnected to The Bold Ones, but aired in its time slot. Hernandez, Houston, P.D. stars Henry Darrow as a Mexican-American homicide detective.
45	16	"And Other Springs I May Not See"	Frank Pierson	Frank Pierson & Mark Rodgers	May 4, 1973
After saving a pregnant 16-year-old from a fiery car wreck, Dr. Amanda Fallon (Jane Wyman) attempts to mend a deep rift between the troubled girl and her divorced mother, who is insisting she have an abortion. Miko Mayama, Pat O'Brien, Laurie Prange, Kathleen Nolan, Stephen Dunne and Leslie Nielsen guest star.
