= Hildy Brooks =

American actress

Hildy Brooks (born December 29, 1934; née Hilda Blumgold; previously known by the acting name Hilda Brawner) is an American actress who appeared on Broadway (starting in the late 1950s) and later on television. Elia Kazan directed her on the Broadway stage in Tennessee Williams' play Sweet Bird of Youth.

In 1961, she appeared in an episode of Route 66 ("Mon Petit Chou") and in the movie "One Plus One" (credited as "Hilda Brawner" in both). She later appeared on episodes of the soap opera The Guiding Light in 1963, and a handful of roles on The Nurses that same year. In Reginald Rose's “Metamorphosis” episode of The Defenders (1961), she played the wife of a prison inmate (played by Robert Duvall).

She appeared on Naked City three times. Her last credit as "Hilda Brawner" came in 1964, when she changed her name to Hildy Brooks. In 1972, she played Eleanor Jordan on "A Very Strange Triangle" episode of The Bold Ones: The New Doctors. She guest-starred in several television episodes during the 1970s, 1980s, and beyond. She is credited as "Hilda" and "Hildy" having played the same role ("Margie") in two recorded versions of Eugene O'Neill's The Iceman Cometh: Sidney Lumet's videotaped The Iceman Cometh (Play of the Week), two-part episode of 1960, and John Frankenheimer's The Iceman Cometh (1973). Her most recent television appearances were in three episodes of Boston Legal (2004–07); one episode of ER (2005); one episode of Cold Case (2009), and, her last credit, one episode of Nip/Tuck (2010).

== Personal life ==
In April 1965 in New York City, Brooks married actor James Antonio, elder brother of actor/director Lou Antonio.
