= Impasse (film) =

1969 American film by Richard Benedict

- Theatrical release poster
- Directed by: Richard Benedict
- Written by: John C. Higgins
- Produced by: Hal Klein; Aubrey Schenck
- Starring: Burt Reynolds; Anne Francis; Vic Diaz; Lyle Bettger; Rodolfo Acosta
- Cinematography: Mars B. Rasca
- Edited by: John F. Schreyer
- Music by: Philip Springer
- Distributed by: United Artists
- Release date: May 7, 1969; (New York City)
- Running time: 100 minutes
- Country: United States
- Language: English

Impasse is a 1969 American film about a group of adventurers trying to recover gold lost in the Philippines during World War II. It stars Burt Reynolds, Anne Francis, Vic Diaz, Lyle Bettger and Rodolfo Acosta.

== Plot ==
Pat Morrison runs a shady salvage operation in Manila. His latest scheme involves finding $3 million worth of gold bars hidden by the military during World War II. To this end, he needs the help of several former soldiers who were present when the gold was hidden. The first is Jesus, a Filipino muslim and Morrison's business associate. The second is Draco, a hard-drinking, hot-tempered Apache living on an Indian reservation who answers Morrison's telegram with the promise of finding a wartime lover named Maria Bonita.

The trio then breaks the third man, the bigoted Hansen, out of a Filipino jail. Draco eventually manages to find Maria in a local bar, but discovers that she has grown older and gained weight. Meanwhile, Morrison rescues the captured Trev Jones, a veteran with a heart condition who has been abducted by Wombat. With Trev's help, Morrison and company are able to figure out the gold's exact location in the Malinta Tunnel on the island of Corregidor. Along the way, Morrison falls in love with Jones's daughter Bobby, a tennis champion. This complicates matters as Morrison is sleeping with Jesus's Japanese wife Mariko, a fact that Jesus discovers and confronts Morrison with.

Despite their differences, the four men are able to successfully locate and retrieve the gold. However, they meet resistance in the Philippine military. A gunfight ensues that leaves Hansen dead, Draco wounded and Jesus captured. After a brief chase, Morrison finds his escape route blocked and it is revealed that a jealous Mariko had tipped authorities off to their plan. The film ends at the airport with Bobby returning to the United States and a smiling Morrison being led away in handcuffs.

== Cast ==
- Burt Reynolds as Pat Morrison
- Anne Francis as Bobby Jones
- Lyle Bettger as Carl Hansen
- Vic Diaz as Jesus Jimenez Riley
- Rodolfo Acosta as Draco
- Jeff Corey as The Wombat
- Clarke Gordon as Trev Jones
- Miko Mayama as Mariko Riley
- Joanne Dalsass as Penny
- Shirley Gorospe as Sherry
- Bruno Punzalan as Nakajima
- Eddie Nicart as Kuli

== Production ==
The film was based on an original script by John C Higgins called Golden Bullet. Aubrey Schenck produced and raised finance through United Artists. It was to be the first of four pictures Schenck was to make for UA, each using Hal Klein as producer.

Burt Reynolds signed to star and Ann-Margret was originally announced as his co star.

Filming began 15 January 1968 in the Philippines. Ann-Margret dropped out and was replaced by Diana Hyland. She dropped out and was replaced by Anne Francis.

== Reception ==
Howard Thompson of the New York Times described the film as "a good one that may get away all too soon", a reference to its limited release. While he cited a couple of glaring plot holes, he praised the exotic setting, the performances, script and direction.

== See also ==
- List of American films of 1969
