= The Bold Ones =

American umbrella television series (1969-1973)

- Genre: Drama; Wheel series Medical drama (The New Doctors); Legal drama (The Lawyers); Crime drama (The Protectors); Political drama (The Senator)
- Country of origin: United States
- Original language: English
- No. of seasons: 4
- No. of episodes: 90 (list of episodes)

Production
- Running time: 50 min
- Production companies: Harbour Productions Unlimited (The New Doctors); Universal Television (All); Public Art Films (The Lawyers)

Original release
- Network: NBC
- Release: September 14, 1969 – May 4, 1973

Related
- The Bold Ones: The New Doctors; The Bold Ones: The Lawyers; The Bold Ones: The Protectors; The Bold Ones: The Senator

The Bold Ones is the umbrella title for a few television series. It was produced by Universal Television and broadcast on NBC from 1969 to 1973. It was a wheel format series, an NBC programming approach also used by that network in series such as The Name of the Game and the NBC Mystery Movie.

== Segments ==
During the four years of the series there were four segments, three of which rotated the first two seasons; in the third the two survivors, The New Doctors and The Lawyers alternated, then The New Doctors in year four was the sole, remaining occupant under The Bold Ones' umbrella. Just as in its wheel predecessor, The Name of the Game, a season consisted of 24 originals with 8 shows filmed for each segment. However, in the debut season the police work forming the setting of The Protectors resulted in its order being reduced by two because of the new politically induced mandate by the networks to their suppliers, the studios, to curtail on-screen violence, action and danger which of course cop shows would not exist without at least some mayhem. So, The New Doctors was the beneficiary, being handed two extra episodes.

Both violence-free The New Doctors and The Lawyers segments of The Bold Ones received pick-ups for a second season while The Protectors became a sacrificial lamb of sorts to be replaced by The Senator starring Hal Holbrook. While The Senator was by far the most critically acclaimed of the four versions of The Bold Ones, NBC dumped it in favor of alternating every week The New Doctors and The Lawyers for the third season. For the final season, an abbreviated fourth, The New Doctors and its 15 episodes were the sole occupant in The Bold Ones' wheel.

Listed here are all four elements:

- The Bold Ones: The New Doctors (1969–73) starred E. G. Marshall, David Hartman, and John Saxon (who was replaced by Robert Walden in the final season).
- The Bold Ones: The Lawyers (1969–72) starred Burl Ives, Joseph Campanella, and James Farentino. This series was based on the TV movies The Sound of Anger and The Whole World Is Watching.
- The Bold Ones: The Protectors (1969–70) starred Leslie Nielsen and Hari Rhodes as an often conflicting police official and district attorney. This series was based on the TV movie Deadlock.
- The Bold Ones: The Senator (1970–71) starred Hal Holbrook. This series was based on the TV movie A Clear and Present Danger.

The New Doctors was based at the "David Craig Institute for New Medicine", named after E.G. Marshall's character Dr. David Craig. David Hartman played Dr. Paul Hunter, with John Saxon (seasons one, two and three) as Dr. Theodore Stuart, replaced in season four by Robert Walden as Dr. Martin Cohen. These stories were medical dramas. Drs. Craig and Hunter appeared in a two-part crossover story with Ironside, "Five Days in the Death of Sgt. Brown". The crossover was produced between the departure of Saxon and the casting of Walden, and featured Vic Morrow as a third main character. The story has since been edited into a feature-length Ironside story with special opening credits added for E.G. Marshall and David Hartman.

The Lawyers featured the legal firm "Nicholls, Darrell & Darrell". Burl Ives appeared as senior partner Walter Nicholls in all episodes, and Joseph Campanella was featured as Brian Darrell in almost every episode. During the course of the three seasons, James Farentino was written out of 6 episodes—two during a three-week suspension in 1969, and four in order to appear in a number of theatrical and television films between 1970 and 1972.

The Protectors was included in the format for the first season only. This segment broke new ground for television as it concentrated on legal matters but incorporated topical racial and political elements. Leslie Nielsen played conservative police officer Lt. Sam Danforth, and Hari Rhodes played liberal District Attorney Bill Washburn. These men frequently clashed politically, professionally and personally, yet had a mutual respect and reluctant admiration for each other. The episodes featured an opening narration by a fictional deadpan radio presenter named "Al Raymond".

The Senator was included during the second season as a replacement for The Protectors. Hal Holbrook played Washington Senator Hays Stowe, a tireless crusader and investigator of social and political issues on behalf of the American citizen, giving a positive spin to the political scene. Sharon Acker appeared as Erin Stowe, his wife with Cindy Eilbacher as Norma Stowe, their daughter, and Michael Tolan as the senator's chief aide, Jordan Boyle.

Like other wheel shows (The Name of The Game, The Men From Shiloh, Search, The NBC Mystery Movie etc.) The Bold Ones segments were rotated from week to week, with the main cast of every segment credited at the top of every episode until the abbreviated final season (1972–1973), when only The New Doctors remained. While its sixteen episodes were double that of its first two, full seasons when it was on every third week, 'The New Doctors' succumbed as a mid-season casualty with NBC pulling the plug January 1973. Four months later, May 4, 1973, Jane Wyman's physician-themed "Amanda Fallon" pilot, reworked from 1972, with David Hartman once again making a brief appearance as Dr. Hunter, aired as the final episode of 'The New Doctors,' although its setting is far removed from the David Craig Institute.

Like The Name of The Game, The Bold Ones' opening graphic originally rotated, displaying the featured cast first, followed by the other segments' casts, with accompanying narration. In the first season, the narrator announced the series' umbrella title, followed by the narration:

The New Doctors... Doctors expanding new horizons of the new medicines... The Lawyers... Lawyers defending justice in the nation's courtrooms... The Protectors... Public servants enforcing the laws of a challenging society... These are The Bold Ones.

== Awards ==
The Lawyers was nominated for three Emmy Awards in 1972, winning one for its music and another for its direction.

The Senator, which lasted for only eight episodes, earned nine Emmy nominations in 1971, winning five, including best drama, best "continued performance" by an actor (Hal Holbrook), and three additional separate awards for outstanding achievement in writing, direction, and film editing, respectively.

== Syndication ==
The series has been in syndication, previously paired with episodes of George Kennedy's Sarge, which was also produced by Universal.
