= Somebody Has to Shoot the Picture =

1990 television film

- Genre: Drama
- Written by: Doug Magee
- Directed by: Frank Pierson
- Starring: Roy Scheider; Bonnie Bedelia; Robert Carradine
- Theme music composer: James Newton Howard
- Country of origin: United States
- Original language: English

Production
- Executive producer: William Sackheim
- Producer: Alan Barnette
- Production locations: Mount Dora, Florida; Orlando, Florida; New York City
- Cinematography: Bojan Bazelli
- Editor: Peter Zinner
- Running time: 104 minutes
- Production companies: HBO Pictures; Alan Barnette Productions; MCA Television Entertainment

Original release
- Network: HBO
- Release: September 9, 1990

Somebody Has to Shoot the Picture is a 1990 American made-for-television prison drama film written by photojournalist Doug Magee, inspired by his interviews with and photos of death row prisoners. The film was directed by Frank Pierson.

== Plot ==
Ray Eames has spent seven years on death row for the shooting of policeman Jackie McGrath in a drug bust gone wrong. His electrocution being finally scheduled, Eames' last request is for someone to photograph his death. Paul Marish reluctantly takes the job. Upon his arrival at the airport he meets Jake Rusher, McGrath's former partner. Rusher urges Marish not to take the photo — that it will just re-traumatize those who would rather Eames be forgotten. On the day the execution is scheduled, Marish visits with Eames in his cell while Eames gets his head shaved. Eames is taken to the chair and blindfolded; but at the last moment another reprieve is ordered. Marish leaves the prison that night past sign-waving protesters and counter-protesters. Rusher, among the crowd, is not able to reach Marish's car. Rusher returns to his home (which is also the town's exotic-pet store), frees the pets, writes "NO JUSTICE" in marker on a crime-scene photograph, and then shoots himself.

Dan Weston, a reporter for Time, arrives on the scene to cooperate with Marish in getting the story. Weston and Marish visit McGrath's widow, Hannah, and are present when she and policeman Jerry Brown receive the news that Rusher has killed himself. Finally, Weston and Marish interview D.A. Steve March, who tells them the official story of McGrath's murder and reiterates that crimes like Eames' are "why the death penalty was invented." Marish replies that "you scare me a hell of a lot more than he does"; the pair are thrown out of March's office.

Eames' latest reprieve expires and he is again scheduled for execution. Marish begins to sense a mystery: Why would Rusher have been so upset as to commit suicide? At the same time, a romance begins to bloom between Marish and Hannah McGrath.

Marish discovers that the crime-scene photograph Rusher left behind was photographically reversed with respect to the photograph used in court, indicating that the bullet that killed McGrath must have come from a different direction. Marish begins to suspect that Eames didn't shoot McGrath after all. Assistant D.A. Mike Knighton tells Marish and Weston that Eames' partner Floyd Tatum had been a confidential informant, and that he (Knighton) had shot and killed Tatum several years later. Hannah and Marish discover that in fact Tatum is still alive; Rusher had been sending Tatum $1000 a month to maintain his silence. Marish, Hannah, and Brown locate and confront Tatum. He refuses to testify in Eames' defense, but Marish secretly records Tatum's confession. Tatum tells them that Knighton, Rusher, and himself were trafficking drugs. McGrath had discovered their scheme and tried to stop them, and so they had brought in Eames as a patsy; it was actually Rusher who had shot and killed McGrath. Furthermore, Hannah admits, she had been having an affair with Rusher, thus giving him a second motive for the murder — to get rid of her husband.

It is already the evening of Eames' execution as Hannah and Marish rush back to town. Hannah plays Tatum's taped confession for D.A. March and Judge Landis, but Landis refuses to give Eames yet another trial on evidence that March characterizes as "hearsay." Meanwhile, at the prison, Marish tries in vain to stop Eames' execution, yelling and pounding on the glass of the witnesses' chamber. It takes two electrical charges to kill Eames. After he is dead, the phone rings — Landis has reprieved Eames too late. Marish shoots photographs of the stunned warden and the witnesses' confusion. He exits the prison amid fireworks and crowds cheering Eames' death on the one side and candlelight protesters on the other.

== Cast ==
- Roy Scheider as Paul Marish
- Bonnie Bedelia as Hannah McGrath
- Robert Carradine as Jerry Brown
- Andre Braugher as Dan Weston
- Arliss Howard as Ray Eames
- Marc Macaulay as Superintendent Stanton
- Antoni Corone as Mike Knighton
- Tom Nowicki as Steve March
- Tom Schuster as Jake Rusher
