= Miko Mayama =

Japanese-American actress (born 1939)

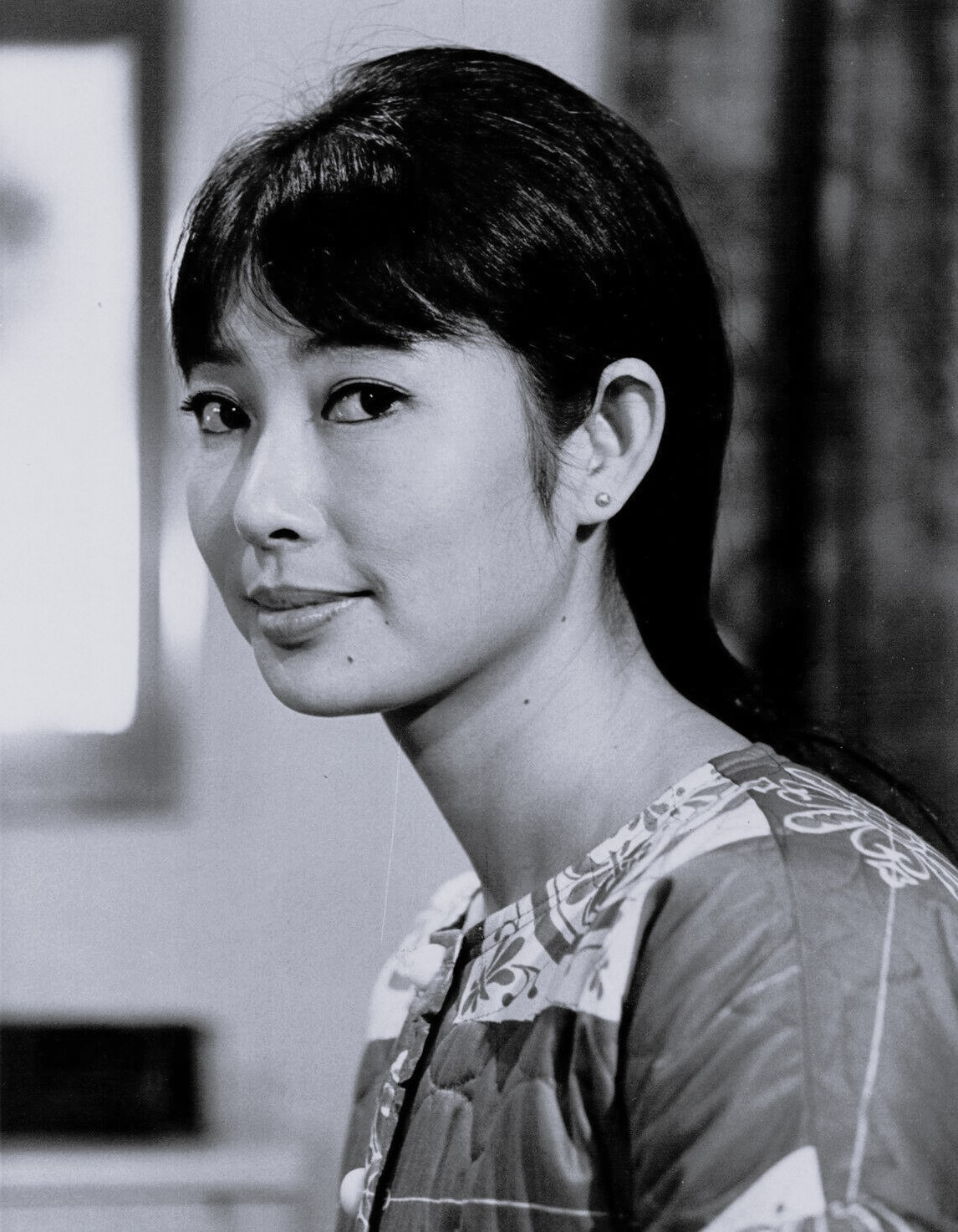
- Mayama in Ironside (1971)
- Born: August 15, 1939 (age 87); Kyoto, Empire of Japan
- Occupation: Actress
- Years active: 1965-1979

Miko Mayama (born August 15, 1939 in Kyoto, Japan) is a Japanese-American actress. She was active in the 1960s and 1970s.

== Career ==
Mayama made film and television appearances from the mid 1960s to the late 1970s. She had a supporting role in Hey Landlord! (1966); her guest appearances on series television include Valentine's Day (1965), I Spy (1966), Star Trek (1967), It Takes a Thief (1968), The Beverly Hillbillies (1971), Ironside (1971), Medical Center (1971-1972), Hawaii Five-O (1972), Kojak (1974), Mannix (1974), and M*A*S*H (1979).

Her films include Impasse (1969), The Hawaiians (1970), Amanda Fallon (1973), That Man Bolt (1973) and Cage Without a Key (1975).

== Personal life ==
Mayama met Burt Reynolds in 1968 while working in Japan as a kabuki theater player. Reynolds was in Japan to film Impasse and Mayama signed on to the cast. They lived together from 1968 to 1971. She learned English by watching Bugs Bunny cartoons, according to Reynolds' autobiography But Enough About Me.

== Filmography ==
- 1965: Valentine's Day (TV series)
- 1965: Wendy and Me (TV series)
- 1965: Boeing Boeing
- 1966: I Spy (TV series), "Court of the Lion"
- 1966: Walk, Don't Run
- 1966: Hey, Landlord (TV series)
- 1967: F Troop (TV series), "From Karate with Love"
- 1967: Star Trek (episode: "A Taste of Armageddon", character: Yeoman Tamura)
- 1967: The War Wagon (The War Wagon)
- 1968: It Takes a Thief (TV series), "A Case of Red Turnips"
- 1969: Impasse
- 1969: Love, American Style (TV series)
- 1969: The Courtship of Eddie's Father
- 1970: The Flying Nun (TV series)
- 1970: The Hawaiians
- 1970: Matt Lincoln (TV series)
- 1971: To Rome with Love (TV series)
- 1971: The Beverly Hillbillies (TV series), 3 episodes
- 1971: Ironside (1967 TV series) (TV series)
- 1971-1972: Medical Center (TV series)
- 1972: Hawaii Five-O (1968 TV series) (TV series)
- 1973: The Bold Ones: The New Doctors (TV series)
- 1973: Amanda Fallon (TV movie)
- 1973: That Man Bolt
- 1974: Kojak (TV series)
- 1974: Mannix (TV series)
- 1975: Cage Without a Key (TV movie)
- 1979: M*A*S*H (TV series, episode 7-18)
