= Showdown at Abilene =

1956 film by Charles F. Haas

- Directed by: Charles F. Haas
- Screenplay by: Berne Giler
- Story by: Clarence Upson Young
- Produced by: Howard Christie
- Starring: Jock Mahoney; Martha Hyer; Lyle Bettger
- Cinematography: Irving Glassberg
- Edited by: Ray Snyder
- Music by: Joseph Gershenson
- Production company: Universal Pictures
- Distributed by: Universal Pictures
- Release date: October 3, 1956
- Running time: 77 minutes
- Country: United States
- Language: English

Showdown at Abilene is a 1956 American Western film directed by Charles F. Haas and starring Jock Mahoney, Martha Hyer, and Lyle Bettger. The film was produced and distributed by Universal Pictures. In 1967, it was remade by Universal as Gunfight in Abilene with Bobby Darin playing the lead.

== Plot ==
Jim Trask, former sheriff of Abilene, returns to the town after fighting for the Confederacy to find everyone thought he was dead. His old friend Dave Mosely is now engaged to Trask's former sweetheart and is one of the cattlemen increasingly feuding with the original farmers. Trask is persuaded to take up as sheriff again, but something about the death of Mosely's brother in the Civil War is haunting him.

== Cast ==
- Jock Mahoney as Jim Trask
- Martha Hyer as Peggy Bigelow
- Lyle Bettger as Dave Mosely
- David Janssen as Verne Ward
- Grant Williams as Chip Tomlin
- Ted de Corsia as Dan Claudius
- Harry Harvey as Ross Bigelow
- Dayton Lummis as Jack Bedford
- Richard H. Cutting as Nelson
- Robert Anderson as Sprague (as Robert G. Anderson)
- John Maxwell as Frank Scovie
- Lane Bradford as Loop

== See also ==
- List of American films of 1956
