= Amanda Fallon =

1973 film

- Genre: Drama
- Created by: Robert M. Young
- Written by: Frank Pierson; Mark Rogers
- Directed by: Jack Laird
- Starring: Jane Wyman
- Music by: Dave Grusin
- Country of origin: United States
- Original language: English

Production
- Executive producer: William Frye
- Producer: Jack Laird
- Running time: 60 minutes
- Production company: Universal Television

Original release
- Network: NBC
- Release: May 4, 1973

Amanda Fallon is a 1973 American television pilot directed by Jack Laird and starring Jane Wyman which was produced as a spin-off of The Bold Ones: The New Doctors (1969–1973) that was never picked up. It aired as the series finale: "And Other Things I May Not See". The pilot aired on NBC on May 4, 1973.

== Plot ==
Dr. Amanda Fallon (Jane Wyman) becomes involved with the problems of a teenage girl — an accident victim who is also from a broken home and pregnant.

== Cast ==
- Jane Wyman ... Dr. Amanda Fallon
- Laurie Prange ... Joyce Cummings
- Kathleen Nolan ... Carol Steadman
- Leslie Nielsen ... Mr. Cummings
- Pat O'Brien ... Emory
- David Fresco ... Hertz
- Miko Mayama ... Irene Watanbe
- Eric Chase ... Washburn
