= Lane Bradford =

American actor (1922–1973)

- Lane Bradford in Maverick 1960
- Born: John Myrtland Le Varre, Jr. August 29, 1922; Yonkers, New York, U.S.
- Died: June 6, 1973 (aged 50); Honolulu, Hawaii, U.S.
- Resting place: Hawaii
- Occupation: Actor
- Years active: 1940–1973

Lane Bradford (born John Myrtland Le Varre, Jr.; August 29, 1922 – June 6, 1973) was an American actor. He appeared in more than 250 films and television series between 1940 and 1973, specializing in supporting "tough-guy" roles predominantly in Westerns but also in more contemporary crime dramas such as Dragnet, The Fugitive, and Hawaii Five-O.

== Early life ==
Lane Bradford was born in 1922, the son of John Merton.

== Career ==
Bradford appeared in many television series and "B" western films. On stage, he co-starred in Desperadoes' Outpost (1952), The Great Sioux Uprising (1953, and Apache Warrior (1957).

Bradford played the historical figure Sequoyah, the namesake of Sequoia National Park, in the 1954 episode "Sequoia" of the western anthology series Death Valley Days hosted by Stanley Andrews. The segment covers Sequoyah from earliest years to his development of the Cherokee alphabet. Carol Thurston and Angie Dickinson played Sali and Ayoka, respectively. In a 1959 Death Valley Days episode, "The Blonde King," Bradford played California pioneer Jim Savage, a friend of the Indians who works to stop a threat to the peace of the Yosemite Valley.

In the 1950s, 1960s, and early 1970s, Bradford guest-starred on nearly all of the Western series broadcast on American television. He was cast on the ABC/Warner Brothers series, Colt .45 as Pete Jesup in the 1959 episode "The Devil's Godson". He also appeared on Hopalong Cassidy, The Lone Ranger (fifteen times), Buffalo Bill, Jr. (six times), Laredo (five times), The Cisco Kid, Tales of the Texas Rangers (twice), Jefferson Drum, Death Valley Days (twelve times), Johnny Ringo, Maverick, The Adventures of Rin-Tin-Tin (five times), Lassie (1965), The Life and Legend of Wyatt Earp (six times), Cheyenne (seven times), Wagon Train (eight times, including his role as Binnes in "The Jarbo Pierce Story" S8 E26 1965), The High Chaparral (twice), The Restless Gun (four times), Bat Masterson, Bonanza (fourteen times), Gunsmoke (thirteen times), Rawhide (five times), The Travels of Jaimie McPheeters, Storefront Lawyers, Ripcord, and Sergeant Preston of the Yukon.

Bradford guest-starred on the religion anthology series, Crossroads. He made two appearances on CBS's Perry Mason, including the role of Detective Arnold Buck in the 1962 episode "The Case of the Absent Artist."

His last television appearance was in 1973 on an episode of the CBS private-detective series Cannon, with William Conrad. The episode, titled "Press Pass to the Slammer", aired that year on March 13, just three months before Bradford's death.

== Death ==
In early June 1973, Bradford collapsed while boating in Hawaii. Rushed to Kaiser Memorial Hospital in Honolulu, the 50-year-old actor died at that facility four days later of a cerebral hemorrhage. Although most biographical profiles of Bradford cite his death date as June 7, 1973, that date is actually incorrect. His official death certificate, which was issued by Kaiser Memorial Hospital, documents that he died on June 6, 1973. In accordance with Bradford's wishes, the Oahu Cemetery Association administered the cremation of his remains.

== Selected filmography ==
- 1940: Frontier Crusader - Cowhand (uncredited)
- 1940: Riders of Black Mountain - Deputy (uncredited)
- 1946: Silver Range - Browning
- 1946: Overland Riders - Deputy
- 1947: Prairie Raiders - Stark
- 1947: Return of the Lash - Dave
- 1947: Shadow Valley - Cowhand Bob
- 1947: Black Hills - Henchman Al Cooper
- 1947: Ghost Town Renegades - Waco
- 1948: Dead Man's Gold - Mayor Evans
- 1948: Check Your Guns - Slim Grogan
- 1948: Adventures of Frank and Jesse James - Henchman Bill
- 1949: Death Valley Gunfighter - Snake Richards
- 1949: Prince of the Plains - Henchman Keller
- 1950: The Arizona Cowboy - Henchman Curley Applegate
- 1951: Wanted: Dead or Alive - Henchman Utah Grant
- 1951: Oklahoma Justice - Henchman Deuce Logan
- 1951: Wells Fargo Gunmaster - Saloon Gunman
- 1952: Man from the Black Hills - Sheriff Moran
- 1952: Texas City - Hank
- 1952: Waco - Wallace
- 1953: Law and Order - Rider announcing Sheriff return (uncredited)
- 1953: Savage Frontier - Henchman Tulsa Tom
- 1953: Kansas Pacific - Max (uncredited)
- 1953-1956: Adventures of Superman (TV Series) - Al / Guree the Bear / Capt. Chris White
- 1954: Drums Across the River - Ralph Costa
- 1954: The Golden Idol - Joe Hawkins
- 1955: Stranger on Horseback - Kettering Henchman (uncredited)
- 1955: Seven Angry Men - Ruffian on Train (uncredited)
- 1955: The Spoilers - Second Sourdough (uncredited)
- 1955-1959: Fury (NBC, TV series) - Verne / Vern Bates / Bart - aka Verne Clancy
- 1956: The Conqueror - Chieftain #4 (uncredited)
- 1956: The Steel Jungle - Guard
- 1956: Red Sundown - Mike Zellman (uncredited)
- 1956: The Rawhide Years - River Pirate (uncredited)
- 1956: Gun Brothers - Deputy (uncredited)
- 1956: Showdown at Abilene - Loop
- 1957: The Phantom Stagecoach - Langton (uncredited)
- 1957: Shoot-Out at Medicine Bend - Stone (uncredited)
- 1957: Gun Glory - Ugly (uncredited)
- 1957: Apache Warrior - Sgt. Gaunt
- 1956-1957: Sergeant Preston of the Yukon (TV Series) - Bart Larson / Jason Bowhead / Big Ike Bancroft
- 1958: Richard Diamond, Private Detective (CBS-TV, Series) - Sol Noonan
- 1958: The Sheepman - Ranch Hand (uncredited)
- 1958: The Toughest Gun in Tombstone - Curly Bill Brosius
- 1958: The Lone Ranger and the Lost City of Gold - Wilson
- 1959: Have Gun – Will Travel - Frank Tanner
- 1959-1960: The Texan (CBS, TV Series, with Chill Wills) - Buck Tanner / Jed Burdette / Gabe Kiley / Spike Taylor
- 1959-1972: Gunsmoke (TV Series) - Dump Hart / Joe Eggers / Bradford / Reese / Dan O'Hare / Davis / Lige / Gant / Bob / Rawlins / Tush / Jay
- 1959: Rawhide – Crofts in S2:E7, "Incident at the Buffalo Smokehouse"
- 1960: Rawhide – Matt Holden in S2:E22, "Incident of ther Champagne Bottles"
- 1960: Bourbon Street Beat (ABC-TV, Series) - Bailey
- 1960: Bat Masterson (TV Series) - Rob Bradbury
- 1960: Tate (NBC-TV, with Robert Redford) - William Essey
- 1961: Sea Hunt (TV Series) - Capt. Jonathan Moss / Frank Judd
- 1961: Rawhide – Dorn in S3:E16, "Incident on the Road Back"
- 1961: Rawhide – Baines in S4:E6, "The Inside Man"
- 1962: Rawhide – George Ash in S4:E27, "House of the Hunter"
- 1963: The Gun Hawk - Joe Sully
- 1963: The Dakotas (ABC-TV Series) - Sergeant Abel Round
- 1964: A Distant Trumpet - Maj. Miller
- 1964: Perry Mason - "The Case of the Nautical Knot" as a Rider on Horseback
- 1965: Shenandoah - Tatum (uncredited)
- 1965: The Slender Thread - Al McCardle
- 1965: Lassie (TV Series) - Sam
- 1965: Wagon Train - TV Series - Biggers
- 1965: Gunsmoke - TV Series - Dan O’Hare
- 1966: Batman (ABC-TV Series) - Cordy Blue
- 1967: Rango (ABC-TV Series) - Cole Colton (Episode: "Shootout at Mesa Flats")
- 1967: Dragnet (NBC-TV Series) - Champ Ridgely
- 1968: Journey to Shiloh - Case Pettibone
- 1971: Shoot Out - Prison Warden (uncredited)
- 1971-1973: Hawaii Five-O (CBS-TV Series) - Manola / Moose Oakley
- 1973: Cannon (CBS-TV Series) - Walt Morgan
