= Signal 30 (Mad Men) =

- Mad Men episode
- Lane Pryce (Jared Harris) and Pete Campbell (Vincent Kartheiser) prepare to fight as Bertram (Robert Morse), Roger (John Slattery), and Don (Jon Hamm) look on during the climax of "Signal 30".
- Episode no.: Season 5 Episode 5
- Directed by: John Slattery
- Written by: Frank Pierson; Matthew Weiner
- Original air date: April 15, 2012
- Running time: 48 minutes

Guest appearances
- Alison Brie as Trudy Campbell; Embeth Davidtz as Rebecca Pryce; Larisa Oleynik as Cynthia Cosgrove; David Hunt as Edwin Baker; Teyonah Parris as Dawn Chambers; Parker Young as Jim Hanson; Cherilyn Wilson as Daphne; Amanda Bauer as Jenny Gunther

Episode chronology
← Previous "Mystery Date"	Next → "Far Away Places"
- Mad Men season 5

"Signal 30" is the fifth episode of the fifth season of the American television drama series Mad Men and the 57th episode of the series overall. It was written by series creator and executive producer Matthew Weiner and writer Frank Pierson, and directed by main cast member John Slattery. It originally aired on the AMC channel in the United States on April 15, 2012.

The episode takes place between July 1966 and August 1966, with references to the 1966 World Cup Final, the Charles Whitman shooting rampage, and the crash of Braniff Flight 250. Business and pleasure converge on each other at both a dinner party thrown by the Campbells and a misguided brothel visit intended to woo a client. Pete discovers that Ken is writing science fiction under a pseudonym, which angers Roger Sterling. Pete's emasculation continues after a routine office meeting ends in fisticuffs.

The episode's title is derived from the infamous 1959 driving safety film of the same name, which Pete Campbell is required to watch as part of his driver's education class. The film, shown widely to high school students across the country during the 1960s, was produced by the Ohio State Highway Patrol and takes its name from the police radio code used by that agency for a fatal traffic accident.

"Signal 30" received 2.69 million viewers and a 1.0 in the coveted 18-49 demographic. It was met with rave reviews, with many commentators calling it the best episode of the season so far. Critics commended John Slattery for his directing work. Matthew Weiner and his Academy Award-winning co-writer Frank Pierson were also praised for the symbolism of the leaking tap and the character study of Pete Campbell.

== Plot ==
Pete Campbell fixes a dripping faucet, taking satisfaction in the job. Later, he attends a driver's education class, where he flirts with a teenage classmate. Lane Pryce watches England's victory in the 1966 World Cup at a bar with other expatriates, and strikes up a friendship with Edwin Baker, a representative of Jaguar Cars looking for a US advertising agency. He excitedly reports this to the partners, all of whom save Pete are supportive.

The Campbells throw a dinner party for the Cosgroves and the Drapers where Ken's writing career is accidentally brought up in conversation by his wife. When Don learns of Ken's writing success he is supportive of it; in contrast, Pete denigrates it. Afterwards, the tap Pete previously "fixed" bursts, spraying water everywhere. Pete rushes away to get his toolbox, but by the time he returns, Don has already fixed it, explaining that Pete's previous fix was merely a coincidence. Pete returns to his driver's ed class to find that a new student, Hanson (nicknamed "handsome"), has the attention of the girl Pete had previously flirted with.

Roger advises Lane about how to ensnare a client at dinner, but the inexperienced Lane fails to do so. The next day, Pete manipulatively advises Lane to let himself, Roger, and Don take over. At the dinner meeting, Edwin assures them that SCDP will have his business, but he wants to have some "fun". They visit a local brothel, where Edwin, Roger, and Pete all cheat on their wives, leaving Don at the bar. Don later shares a cab with Pete on the way home in which Pete says bitterly that he has everything; Don warns him not to throw it away.

The next day, Roger calls Ken into his office and bluntly tells him to stop writing in his spare time. Later, Lane storms into a partners' meeting, shouting at Pete about how Edwin's wife has found out about Edwin's adultery and Edwin has withdrawn his business. Lane blames Pete, and Pete responds first with homophobia and then by denigrating Lane's role at the firm. Lane responds by challenging Pete to a fistfight; the other partners do not intervene and Lane wins, leaving a bloodied Pete on the office floor. Joan goes to comfort Lane, but Lane misinterprets her affection as romantic and kisses her. Joan, startled, stands and opens the door, but does not leave.

Peggy excitedly tells Ken about Lane's beating up Pete. Ken takes pleasure in this, knowing that Pete informed Roger about Ken's writing. Later, a dejected and bloodied Pete vents his despair to Don in the elevator, hypocritically bemoaning how a fight could happen amongst "friends". Close to tears, he blurts out that he has nothing.

That night, Ken starts a new story about a character clearly based on Pete. Back in driver's ed class, Pete watches helplessly as Hanson effortlessly seduces the girl Pete had his eye on, while the dripping sound of the leaky tap replays in his mind.

== Production ==
Creator Matthew Weiner co-wrote the episode with 86-year-old veteran screenwriter and Academy Award winner (for Dog Day Afternoon) Frank Pierson. Pierson offered Weiner his writing services back in 2009, leading him to serve as a consulting producer on the third season. About Pierson, Weiner said, "He's now in the writer's room. Arguably one of the greatest living writers. It means you're doing something right." Cast member John Slattery, who portrays Roger Sterling on the series, directed the episode, the third time he directed for the series.

Weiner stated that the episode was about the question -- "What do you want?" and "Do you ever get a chance to have it?", as well as the "tentative nature of business friendships". He used Lane's friendship with the Jaguar executive and the dinner at Pete Campbell's house as examples. Vincent Kartheiser reasoned that Pete invited them over to show off his wife, home, and success. Jon Hamm elaborated on Don's reluctance to go as his desire to keep his relationship separate from the poisonous influence of Sterling Cooper Draper Pryce.

Jon Hamm pointed to Don's bad history with brothels as to his reluctance to take part in the festivities, while noting that "Pete has no such problem." Of Pete's scene with the prostitute, Weiner said, "You see what his fantasy is. You see his powerlessness" and that Pete is "trying to keep his life exciting". Due to the desperation and unhappiness inherent in Pete Campbell's character as demonstrated in this episode, Weiner called it "probably the saddest episode we've ever had."

The fight scene, according to Jared Harris, was Lane discovering what Pete really thought of him. Harris saw the boxing match as "a mix of so many different styles" with Lane carrying an "old school and traditional" stance. Harris saw it as Lane getting a chance to "fight for his dignity".

== Reception ==
=== Ratings ===
"Signal 30" was watched by 2.69 million viewers and obtained a 1.0 adults 18-49 rating, a slight drop from the previous episode.

=== Critical reception ===
The episode opened to laudatory reviews from the television critic community, with much praise reserved for John Slattery's direction and the acting work of Vincent Kartheiser. Emily St. James of The A.V. Club gave the episode an A, her highest grade for the season so far, calling it "transfixing and incredible" and "season five's first instant classic". She praised the symbol of the dripping tap as well as the editing choices that suggested "the way that time passes, so that it almost seems as if you’ve lost yourself in the mists of your own life". Alan Sepinwall, writing for HitFix, exalted Slattery's "strong command of the comedic moments", and recognized that "most of the carnage" of the episode "comes out of failed attempts by Pete, Lane and Ken to be more than they are by building bridges from one world to another."

Meredith Blake, reviewer for the Los Angeles Times, said that the episode was a sort of masculine companion piece to the fourth season episode "The Beautiful Girls", as "Signal 30" focuses on "collective identity crisis of the agency's male population". Paste magazine writer Bonnie Stiernberg called Pete Campbell "one of the most complex, underrated characters on TV today" and called the dripping sink "more like a fucking geyser in reality, and if he doesn’t do something to plug it up soon, he’s going to drown." Jordan Bartel of the Chicago Tribune called the episode "a classic" and saw a possible Emmy nomination for Vincent Kartheiser, but felt the kitchen sink symbolism and ending voiceover was a little heavyhanded. Maureen Ryan of The Huffington Post praised Lane's character and Slattery's direction during the fight sequence, singling out Don, Bert, and Roger's reactions as "absolute comedy gold". She also compared the Pete character to former U.S. President Richard Nixon because: "there's a sense with Pete that there's always a chip on his shoulder and he'll eternally feel misunderstood and undervalued. He'll always inspire a mixture of pity and exasperation, because he's smart and insightful, but he can be a piece of work."
