= Braniff International Airways Flight 250 =

1966 aviation accident in the United States

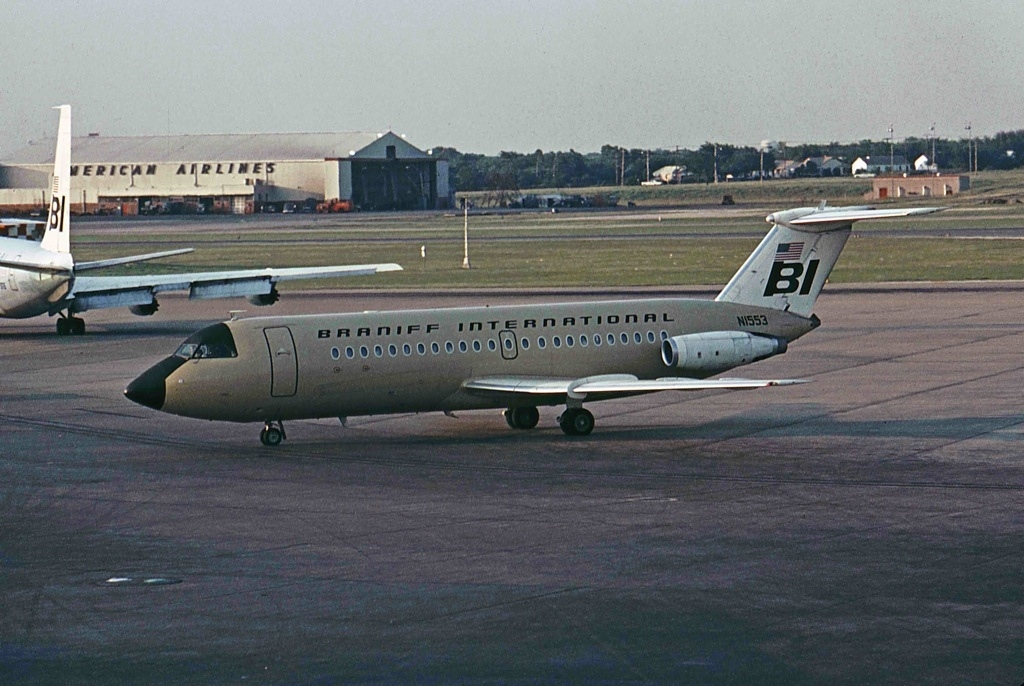
- N1553, the aircraft involved in the accident, pictured in July 1966

accident
- Date: August 6, 1966
- Summary: In-flight structural failure
- Site: Richardson County, near Falls City, Nebraska, United States; 40°10′29.80″N 95°32′20.30″W
- Location in Nebraska on a farm north of Falls City, and east of Verdon, Nebraska

Aircraft
- Aircraft type: BAC 1-11-203AE
- Operator: Braniff Airways
- Registration: N1553
- Flight origin: New Orleans International Airport
- 1st stopover: Shreveport Regional Airport
- 2nd stopover: Fort Smith Regional Airport
- 3rd stopover: Tulsa International Airport
- 4th stopover: Kansas City Municipal Airport
- 5th stopover: Omaha Eppley Airfield
- Destination: Minneapolis–Saint Paul International Airport
- Occupants: 42
- Passengers: 38
- Crew: 4
- Fatalities: 42
- Survivors: 0

Braniff International Airways Flight 250 crashed near Falls City, Nebraska, United States, on August 6, 1966, en route to Omaha from Kansas City, Missouri. Thirty-eight passengers and four crew members were killed in the crash, which occurred in a farm field late on a Saturday night. In-flight structural failure due to extreme turbulence in an avoidable weather hazard was cited as the cause.

== Aircraft ==
The aircraft was a BAC 1-11-203AE, registration N1553. It was manufactured by British Aircraft Corporation in December 1965.

== Flight crew ==
The cockpit crew consisted of Captain Donald Pauly, 47, and First Officer James Hilliker, 39.

Captain Pauly was highly experienced with 20,767 flying hours, 549 of which were in the BAC-1-11. He possessed type ratings in other aircraft including the DC-3, DC-6, DC-7, and the Convair family.

First Officer Hilliker was less experienced, with 9,269 flying hours, 685 in the BAC-1-11. According to the NTSB report, he had two type ratings in the BAC-1-11 and the Convair family.

== Flight ==
(All times Central Standard Time (UTC–6); Daylight time was used only in Minnesota along the flight's route until 1967.)

Flight 250 was operated by Braniff between New Orleans and Minneapolis with stops in between at Shreveport, Fort Smith, Tulsa, Kansas City, and Omaha. It departed Kansas City at 22:55 on an IFR clearance to Omaha at FL200 (20,000 feet (6,100 m)). However, the crew asked if they could remain at 5,000 feet (1,520 m) because of the weather. The flight remained at 6,000 feet (1,830 m) until permission was received at 23:06 to descend to 5,000 feet. At 23:08, the crew contacted a Braniff flight that had just departed Omaha's Eppley Airfield, which reported moderate to light turbulence.

About four minutes later, Flight 250 entered an updraft within an area of active squall line of severe thunderstorms. The 1-11 violently accelerated upward and in a left roll. At this time the right tailplane and the vertical stabilizer failed. The aircraft then pitched nose down and within one or two seconds the right wing failed as well. The plane tumbled down in flames until entering a flat spin before impacting the ground, approximately midway between Kansas City and Omaha. The probable cause was in-flight structural failure caused by extreme turbulence during operation of the aircraft in an area of avoidable hazardous weather.

This was the first fatal crash of a BAC 1-11 in the United States; it occurred in southeast Nebraska in Richardson County on a farm, about seven miles (11 km) north-northeast of Falls City, in a soybean field only 500 feet (150 m) from a farmhouse. The farm owner and his family were returning home in an automobile at the time of impact (23:12), and were about a half-mile (0.8 km) away. The elevation of the site is approximately 1,100 feet (340 m) above sea level.

== Investigation ==
Braniff regulations prohibited a plane from being dispatched into an area with a solid line of thunderstorms; nonetheless, the company forecast was somewhat inaccurate with respect to the number and intensity of thunderstorms and the intensity of the associated turbulence. Braniff dispatchers were aware that their flight 255 had delayed departing Sioux City for Omaha by one hour to allow the storm to pass Omaha; they also knew that their flight 234 from St. Louis to Des Moines had diverted to Kansas City due to the storm. They did not inform the crew of these events believing they were too far from the route of flight 250 to be relevant. The crew was aware of the severe weather, however, and the first officer suggested that they divert around the activity. The captain instead elected to continue the flight into the edges of the squall line.

The Falls City Journal's cover story shortly after the Braniff International Airways flight crashed in Richardson County, Nebraska.

Dr. Ted Fujita, a renowned weather researcher and professor of meteorology at the University of Chicago, was hired by British Aircraft Corporation, the manufacturer of the BAC 1-11, to study how the weather affected the jet. Dr. Fujita is recognized as the discoverer of downbursts and microbursts and also developed the Fujita scale, which differentiates tornado intensity and links tornado damage with wind speed.

Notably, the accident was the first with a U.S.-registered aircraft in which a cockpit voice recorder (CVR) was used to aid in the investigation. Just before the breakup, the device recorded Captain Pauly instructing First Officer Hilliker to adjust the engine power settings. He was interrupted mid-sentence by buffeting so severe that no more dialog could be discerned on the recording, which continued even after the wings and tail separated from the aircraft. Since the flight data recorder (FDR) was destroyed in the crash, the changes in the buffeting sound would later be used to estimate the airplane's changes in speed and altitude during the accident sequence.

== Aftermath ==
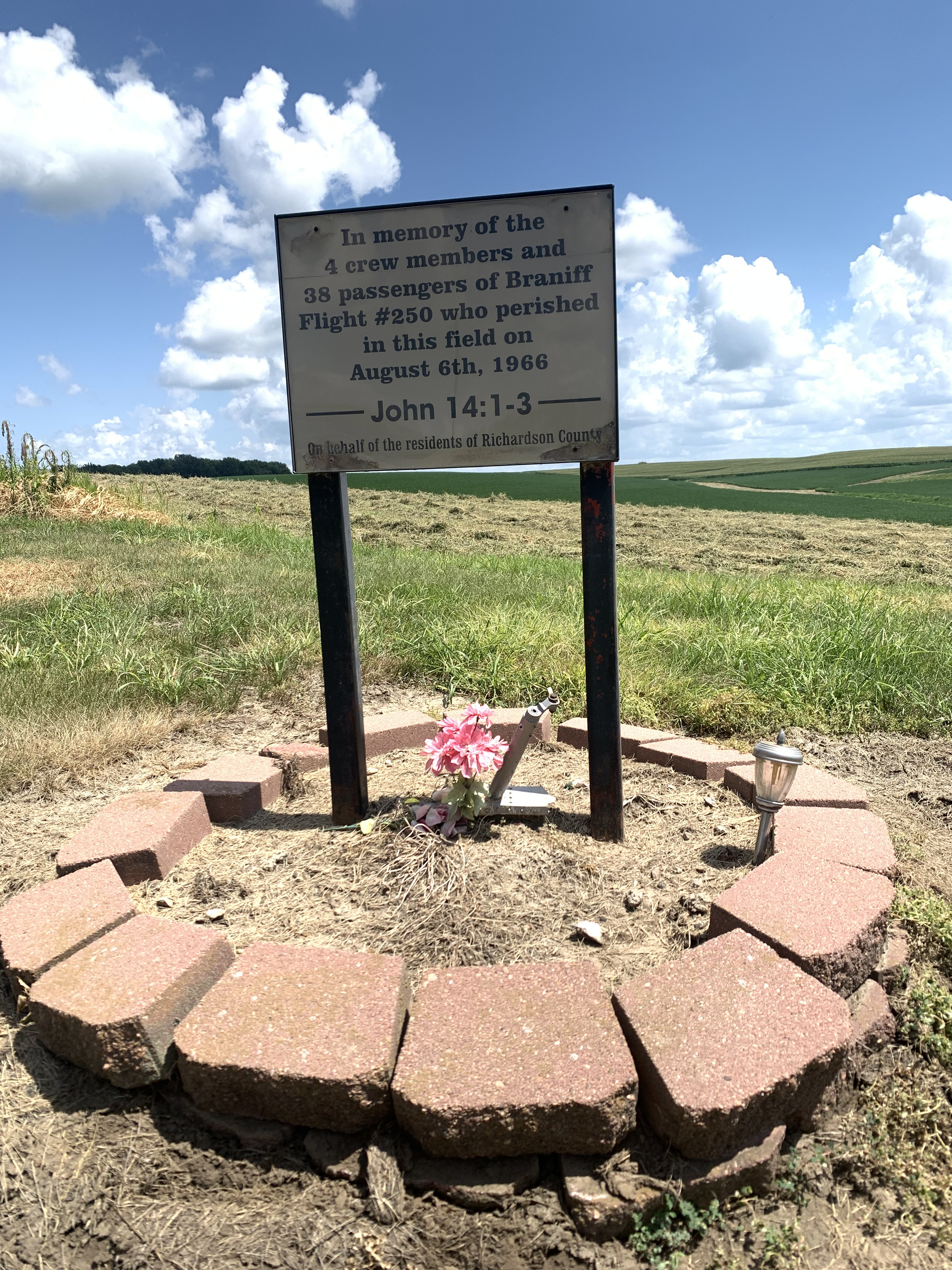
Braniff Flight 250 Memorial in Richardson County

At its fortieth anniversary in 2006, a memorial was placed at the crash site. A fiftieth anniversary memorial event, planned by the county's historical society, was attended by a hundred in 2016.

== In popular culture ==
This crash is covered in detail in the book Air Disaster (Vol. 1) by Macarthur Job, illustrated by Matthew Tesch, and also in Deadly Turbulence: The Air Safety Lessons of Braniff Flight 250 and Other Airliners, 1959-1966, by Steve Pollock.

The U.S. television drama Mad Men referenced this accident briefly in the season 5 episode "Signal 30". In the series, client Mohawk Airlines also operated the BAC 1-11.

== See also ==
- List of accidents and incidents involving commercial aircraft
