= Lyle Bettger =

American actor (1915–2003)

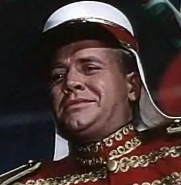
- Bettger in The Greatest Show on Earth (1952)
- Born: February 13, 1915; Philadelphia, Pennsylvania, U.S.
- Died: September 24, 2003 (aged 88); Atascadero, California, U.S.
- Occupation: Actor
- Years active: 1936–1980
- Spouse: Mary Gertrude Rolfe (m. 1941; died 1996)
- Children: 3

Lyle Stathem Bettger (February 13, 1915 – September 24, 2003) was an American character actor who had roles in Hollywood films and television from the 1950s onward, often portraying villains. One such role was the wrathfully jealous elephant handler Klaus from the Oscar-winning film The Greatest Show on Earth (1952).

== Early life and education ==
Bettger was born in Philadelphia, the son of Frank Bettger, an infielder for the St. Louis Cardinals in 1910 (as Frank Betcher), successful insurance salesman and best-selling self-help author, and Mertie Stathem Bettger. He graduated from the Haverford School in Haverford, Pennsylvania and from the American Academy of Dramatic Arts in New York City.

== Stage ==
Bettger's theatrical debut was in Brother Rat at the Biltmore Theatre in New York City in 1936. His Broadway credits include Dance Night (1938), Summer Night (1939), The Flying Gerardos (1940–1941), The Moon Is Down (1942), All for All (1943), Oh, Brother! (1945), John Loves Mary (1947–1948), and Love Life (1948–1949).

When Paramount sent a talent scout to see him, Bettger was signed to a three-year contract.

== Film ==
Bettger's movie career began when he was cast in The Lie in 1949. Movie columnist Frank Neill reported, "On the basis of his performance in the movie, he has been signed to a juicy contract."

Later, Bettger was cast as the villain in the film noir No Man of Her Own (1950). He soon became a regular on the set of Westerns such as Denver and Rio Grande (1952), The Great Sioux Uprising (1953), Forbidden (1953), Drums Across the River (1954), Destry (1955), The Lone Ranger, (1956) and Gunfight at the O.K. Corral (1957).

Bettger developed a reputation for playing the bad guy and excelled in villainous roles such as the menacing Joe Beacom in Union Station (1950) and the cold-blooded Nazi Chief Officer Kirchner in The Sea Chase (1955). One of his later roles was in the 1969 film Impasse as a bigoted World War II veteran.

== Radio ==
Programs on which Bettger appeared in old-time radio included Grand Central Station.

== Television ==
Bettger made numerous appearances in dramatic roles on television, starring in the 1957 series The Court of Last Resort as well as guest starring on Hawaii Five-O, Rawhide, The Tall Man, The Rifleman, Gunsmoke (as Polk, a murdering robber in S9 E22 / 1962 - "The Kite"), Bonanza, Combat!, Blue Light, The Time Tunnel, Death Valley Days, Laramie, and Tales of Wells Fargo (as John Wesley Hardin). He was cast on the right side of the law as U.S. Marshall John Welker to hunt down the bank robber who killed his wife in the 1959 episode, "The Law and the Gun" of Zane Grey Theater. This episode also featured Michael Ansara, Paul Carr and Don Diamond (as Henry Seidel, the wife killer)

== Personal life ==
Bettger was married to Mary Gertrude Rolfe from 1941 until her death in 1996. They had three children: Lyle Jr., Frank, and Paula. She was an actress who played Henry Aldrich's sister in The Aldrich Family on radio. Bettger and his family moved to Hawaii in the late 1960s.

== Filmography ==
| Year | Title | Role | Notes | | | | |
|---|---|---|---|---|---|---|---|
| 1950 | No Man of Her Own | Stephen 'Steve' Morley | | | | | |
| 1950 | Union Station | Joe Beacom | | | | | |
| 1951 | The First Legion | Dr. Peter Morrell | | | | | |
| 1951 | Dear Brat | Mr.Baxter | | | | | |
| 1952 | The Greatest Show on Earth | Klaus | | | | | |
| 1952 | Denver and Rio Grande | Johnny Buff | | | | | |
| 1952 | Hurricane Smith | Clobb | | | | | |
| 1953 | The Vanquished | Roger Hale | | | | | |
| 1953 | The Great Sioux Uprising | Stephen Cook | | | | | |
| 1953 | All I Desire | Dutch Heinemann | | | | | |
| 1953 | Forbidden | Justin Keit | | | | | |
| 1954 | Carnival Story | Frank Colloni | | | | | |
| 1954 | Drums Across the River | Frank Walker | | | | | |
| 1954 | Destry | Decker | | | | | |
| 1955 | The Sea Chase | Chief Officer Kirchner | | | | | |
| 1956 | The Lone Ranger | Reece Kilgore | | | | | |
| 1956 | Showdown at Abilene | Dave Mosely | | | | | |
| 1957 | Gunfight at the O.K. Corral | Ike Clanton | | | | | |
| 1957-1961 | Tales of Wells Fargo | John Wesley Hardin | 2 episodes | | | | |
| 1959 | "The Rifleman" | Jay Jefferson | Episode: The Wrong Man | – | 1960 | Guns of the Timberland | Clay Bell |
| 1962 | Bonanza | Lem Partridge | Episode: "The Guilty" | | | | |
| 1962 | The Rifleman | Holt Coyle | Episode: Skull | | | | |
| 1964 | Combat! | Captain Brauer | Episode: A Rare Vintage | | | | |
| 1965 | Town Tamer | Lee Ring / Marshal Les Parker | | | | | |
| 1966 | Johnny Reno | Mayor Jess Yates | | | | | |
| 1966 | Nevada Smith | Jack Rudabough | | | | | |
| 1966 | Bonanza | Jed Ferguson | Episode: "Something Hurt, Something Wild" S8 E1 | | | | |
| 1967 | Voyage to the Bottom of the Sea | Dr. King | Episode: "The Creature" S3 E15 | | | | |
| 1967 | Return of the Gunfighter | Clay Sutton | | | | | |
| 1967 | The Fastest Guitar Alive | Charlie | | | | | |
| 1969 | Impasse | Hansen | | | | | |
| 1969 | Hawaii Five-O | Joe Fletcher | Episode: "All the King's Horses" | | | | |
| 1970 | The Hawaiians | Janders | | | | | |
| 1971 | The Seven Minutes | Frank Griffith | | | | | |
| 1973 | Hawaii Five-O | Klepper | Episode: "The Sunday Torch" | | | | |
| 1975 | Hawaii Five-O | Admiral Dean | Episode: "Murder: Eyes Only" | | | | |
| 1976 | Hawaii Five-O | Karl Norton | Episode: "Let Death Do Us Part" | | | | |
| 1977 | Hawaii Five-O | Dr. Dimitri Sartain | Episode: "Tsunami" | | | | |
| 1977 | Hawaii Five-O | Jonathan Kaye | Episode: "The Silk Trap" | | | | |
| 1977 | Hawaii Five-O | Jonathan Kaye | Episode: "Head to Head" | | | | |
| 1978 | Hawaii Five-O | Malcolm Rhodes | Episode: "Invitation to Murder" | | | | |
| 1978 | Hawaii Five-O | Jonathan Kaye | Episode: "A Stranger in His Grave" | | | | |
