= Hey, Landlord =

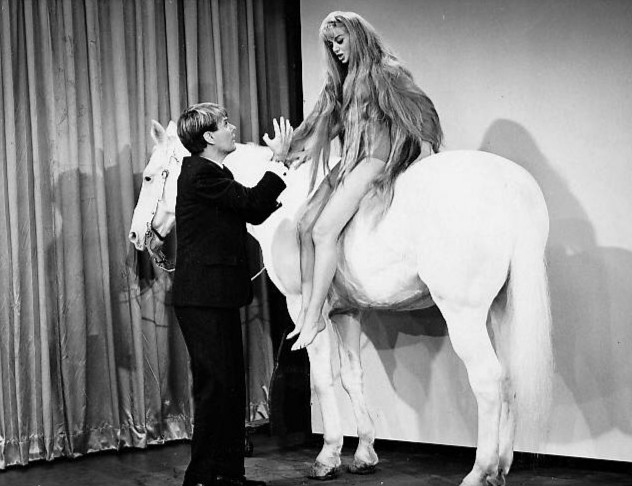
- Will Hutchins and Chanin Hale, 1966.
- Genre: Situation comedy
- Created by: Garry Marshall; Jerry Belson
- Starring: Will Hutchins; Sandy Baron; Michael Constantine; Ann Morgan Guilbert; Kathryn Minner; Pamela Rodgers; Miko Mayama
- Theme music composer: Quincy Jones
- Composer: Quincy Jones
- Country of origin: United States
- Original language: English
- No. of seasons: 1
- No. of episodes: 31

Production
- Executive producer: Lee Rich
- Producers: Garry Marshall; Jerry Belson
- Production companies: Mirisch-Rich Television Productions, in association with United Artists Television

Original release
- Network: NBC
- Release: September 11, 1966 – April 23, 1967

Hey Landlord! is an American sitcom that appeared on NBC during the 1966–1967 season, sponsored by Procter & Gamble in the 8:30-9pm Eastern time period on Sunday nights. It is notable for its casting director Fred Roos, who later became a producer for Francis Ford Coppola. Roos discovered the counterculture sketch group The Committee in San Francisco and cast all members in bit parts in Hey Landlord!. It also served as the first TV show as co-creator/producer for Garry Marshall, who would go on to create Happy Days, Laverne & Shirley, Mork & Mindy and many other shows.

== Plot, cast, and characters ==
This series stars Will Hutchins as Woody Banner, who learns that his uncle has died and that he has inherited from him a New York City brownstone apartment building in Manhattan's East 30s as its landlord. Other tenants in the building are Sandy Baron as comedian Chuck Hookstratten, Jack (Michael Constantine) who was a photographer, glamorous Theresa (Pamela Rodgers) and her roommate and best friend Kyoto (Miko Mayama), who frequently yells, "Hey, Landlord!" thus giving the show its title. Other co-stars are Ann Morgan Guilbert, and Kathryn Minner, who at the time specialized in playing little old ladies. Sally Field later appeared in four episodes as Woody's visiting sister Bonnie.

Plots from a few episodes of the show were believed to have been later used on Marshall's series Laverne & Shirley.

== Production ==
The series lasted one season of 31 episodes; the last episode aired on April 23, 1967.

== Episode list ==
No.	Title	Directed by	Written by	Original release date
1	"Pursuit of a Dream"	Jerry Paris	Jerry Belson & Garry Marshall	September 11, 1966
2	"If She Catches the Bouquet, I'll Die"	Unknown	Carl Kleinschmitt & Dale McRaven	September 18, 1966
3	"From Out of the Past Comes the Thundering Hoofbeats"	Unknown	Carl Kleinschmitt & Dale McRaven	September 25, 1966
4	"The Daring Duo vs. the Incredible Captain Kill"	Unknown	Sam Bobrick & Bill Idelson	October 2, 1966
5	"Instant Family"	Jerry Paris	Jerry Belson & Garry Marshall	October 9, 1966
6	"The Shapes of Wrath"	Jerry Paris	Jerry Belson & Garry Marshall	October 16, 1966
7	"Chuck Nobody"	Unknown	Unknown	October 23, 1966
8	"The Long Hot Bus"	Unknown	Unknown	October 30, 1966
9	"Safari"	Jerry Paris	Carl Kleinschmitt & Dale McRaven	November 13, 1966
10	"When You Need a Hidden Room, You Can Never Find One"	Jerry Paris	Arnold Margolin & Jim Parker	November 20, 1966
11	"Divorce, Bachelor Style"	Jerry Paris	Jerry Belson & Garry Marshall	November 27, 1966
12	"Sizzling Sidney"	Jerry Paris	Arnold Margolin & Jim Parker	December 4, 1966
13	"The Big Fumble"	Jerry Paris	Jerry Belson & Garry Marshall	December 11, 1966
14	"By the Sea, or at Least Rent It"	Jerry Paris	Peggy Elliott & Ed Scharlach	December 18, 1966
15	"How You Gonna Keep 'em Down on the Farm, After They've Seen the Rug?"	Unknown	Unknown	December 25, 1966
16	"Go Directly to Jail"	Jerry Paris	Dale McRaven & Carl Kleinschmitt	January 1, 1967
17	"Roommate, Stay Away from My Door"	Unknown	Unknown	January 8, 1967
18	"A Legend Dies"	Jerry Paris	Arnold Margolin & Jim Parker	January 15, 1967
19	"Oh, How We Danced"	Unknown	Unknown	January 22, 1967
20	"Same Time, Same Station, Same Girl a.k.a. The Screen Queen Quiz"	Unknown	Unknown	January 29, 1967
21	"Stranger in the Night, Than in the Morning"	Jerry Paris	Peggy Elliott & Ed Scharlach	February 5, 1967
22	"How Do You Follow Hi-Lites from Hamlet?"	Jerry Paris	Jim Parker & Arnold Margolin	February 12, 1967
23	"Woody, Can You Spare a Sister?"	Unknown	Unknown	February 19, 1967
24	"Sharin' Sharon"	Unknown	Unknown	February 26, 1967
25	"Big Brother is Watching You"	Unknown	Unknown	March 5, 1967
26	"A Little Off the Top"	Unknown	Unknown	March 12, 1967
27	"Testing 1 - 2 - 3..."	John Rich	Jack Winter	March 26, 1967
28	"Swingle City East"	John Rich	Rick Mittleman	April 2, 1967
29	"Czech Your Wife, Sir?"	Garry Marshall	Peggy Elliott & Ed Scharlach	April 9, 1967
30	"The Dinner Who Came to Man"	Unknown	Unknown	April 16, 1967
31	"Aunt Harriet Wants You"	Jerry Belson	Bill Idelson & Sam Bobrick	April 23, 1967
