= Drums Across the River =

1954 film by Nathan H. Juran

- Film poster by Reynold Brown
- Directed by: Nathan Juran
- Screenplay by: John K. Butler; Lawrence Roman
- Story by: John K. Butler
- Produced by: Melville Tucker
- Starring: Audie Murphy; Walter Brennan; Lyle Bettger
- Cinematography: Harold Lipstein
- Edited by: Virgil W. Vogel
- Production company: Universal Pictures
- Distributed by: Universal Pictures
- Release date: June 1954
- Running time: 78 minutes
- Country: United States
- Language: English
- Box office: $1.1 million

Drums Across the River is a 1954 American Technicolor Western film directed by Nathan Juran and starring Audie Murphy, Walter Brennan and Lyle Bettger.

== Plot ==
Gary Brannon is a peaceful homesteader living a quiet existence with his father Sam. Frank Walker is hoping to open up the Ute Indian territory for gold-mining purposes and tries to foment a war between the Utes and the local whites, while he steals a gold shipment and pins the blame on Gary. Gary starts off hating the Utes because one of them killed his mother but gradually he comes to be on their side and wants to expose the machinations of Walker.

== Cast ==
- Audie Murphy as Gary Brannon
- Walter Brennan as Sam Brannon
- Lyle Bettger as Frank Walker
- Lisa Gaye as Jennie Marlowe
- Hugh O'Brian as Morgan
- Mara Corday as Sue Randolph
- Jay Silverheels as Taos
- Emile Meyer as Nathan Marlowe
- Regis Toomey as Sheriff Jim Beal
- Morris Ankrum as Chief Ouray
- Bob Steele as Billy Costa
- James K Anderson as Jed Walker
- George Wallace as Les Walker
- Lane Bradford as Ralph Costa
- Howard McNear as Stilwell

== Production ==
The film was shot mostly on the Universal backlot, with location filming at Barton Flats, California. This was Murphy's last film with Nathan Juran.
