= The Great Sioux Uprising =

1953 film by Lloyd Bacon

- Film poster by Reynold Brown
- Directed by: Lloyd Bacon
- Written by: Melvin Levy
- Story by: J. Robert Bren; Glady Atwater
- Produced by: Albert J. Cohen
- Starring: Jeff Chandler; Faith Domergue; Lyle Bettger
- Cinematography: Maury Gertsman
- Edited by: Edward Curtiss
- Color process: Technicolor
- Production company: Universal Pictures
- Distributed by: Universal Pictures
- Release dates: June 23, 1953 (Chicago, Illinois); July 17, 1953 (United States)
- Running time: 80 minutes
- Country: United States
- Language: English
- Box office: $1.35 million (US)

The Great Sioux Uprising is a 1953 American Technicolor Western film directed by Lloyd Bacon and starring Jeff Chandler, Faith Domergue and Lyle Bettger. It was produced and distributed by Universal Pictures.

== Plot ==
During the Civil War, in Wyoming, horse dealers Joan Britton (Faith Domergue) and Stephen Cook (Lyle Bettger) are competing to supply the Union Army with horses. A Cherokee, Stan Watie, is in the area to stir up the Sioux against the Union just as Cook decides to steal a herd of Sioux horses. Ex-army doctor Jonathan Westgate (Jeff Chandler) opposes Cook's unscrupulous methods as well as being Cook's rival for the affections of Joan. It seems Westgate is the only one able to prevent a new Indian war.

== Cast ==
- Jeff Chandler as Capt. Jonathan Westgate
- Faith Domergue as Joan Britton
- Lyle Bettger as Stephen Cook
- Peter Whitney as Ahab Jones
- Stacy Harris as Uriah
- Walter Sande as Joe Baird
- Stephen Chase as Maj. McKay
- Glenn Strange as Gen. Stan Watie
- Ray Bennett as Sgt. Manners
- John War Eagle as Chief Red Cloud
- Charles Arnt as Gist
- Julia Montoya as Heyoka
- Dewey Drapeau as Teo-Ka-Ha
- Boyd 'Red' Morgan as Ray
- Lane Bradford as Lee
- Jack Ingram as Sam
- Clem Fuller as Jake
- Virginia Mullen as Madge Baird

== Production ==
In 1952 Jeff Chandler signed a new contract with Universal which doubled his salary. The Great Sioux Uprising was the first film under the new agreement. Alexis Smith and Stephen McNally were meant to co star with Chandler. Eventually Smith was replaced by Faith Domergue. McNally's wife then fell ill and he asked to withdraw from the film; he was replaced by Lyle Bettger. Filming took place in Portland and Pendleton, Oregon.
