= Frank Pierson =

American screenwriter and film director (1925–2012)

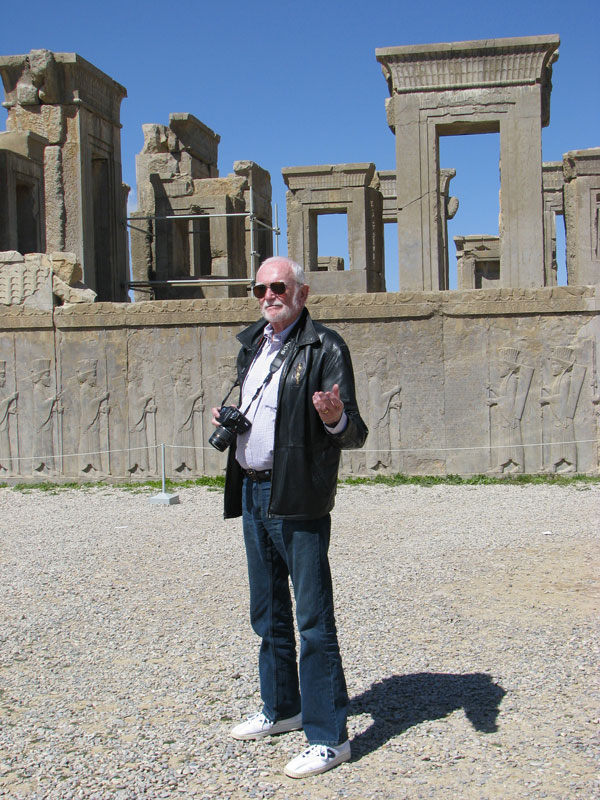
- Pierson in 2009
- Born: May 12, 1925; Chappaqua, New York, U.S.
- Died: July 22, 2012 (aged 87); Los Angeles, California, U.S.
- Resting place: Westwood Village Memorial Park Cemetery
- Education: Harvard University (B.A.)
- Occupations: Director, screenwriter
- Years active: 1944–2012
- Spouse(s): Helene Pierson (? – 2012; his death)
- Children: 2
- Awards: Academy Award for Best Original Screenplay

Frank Romer Pierson (May 12, 1925 – July 22, 2012) was an American screenwriter and film director.

== Life and career ==
Pierson was born in Chappaqua, New York, the son of Louise (née Randall), a writer, and Harold C. Pierson. Pierson's family was the subject of his mother's 1943 autobiography Roughly Speaking and a 1945 movie of the same name, starring Rosalind Russell and Jack Carson as his parents.

Pierson served in the Army during World War II, then graduated from Harvard. He worked as a correspondent for Time and Life magazines before selling his first script to Alcoa-Goodyear Theater. He got his break in Hollywood in 1958 as script editor for Have Gun – Will Travel and moved on to write for the television series Naked City, Route 66 and others. He wrote or co-wrote several successful films, including Cat Ballou and Cool Hand Luke, which both received Academy Award nominations. He wrote Dog Day Afternoon, which won Pierson the Academy Award for Best Original Screenplay. He directed and contributed to the screenplay of the 1976 remake of A Star Is Born. The in-fighting between himself, Barbra Streisand, Kris Kristofferson and producer (and at the time boyfriend of Streisand) Jon Peters on the film led him to write the article "My Battles with Barbra and Jon" for The Village Voice.

Pierson directed several films produced for television, including Dirty Pictures, Citizen Cohn, Conspiracy, and Somebody Has to Shoot the Picture. His direction on Conspiracy won a Directors Guild of America Award for Best Television Movie, and his second Peabody and BAFTA Award.

He was President of the Writers Guild of America, West (WGAW) from 1981 to 1983 and again from 1993 to 1995 and was President of the Academy of Motion Picture Arts and Sciences (AMPAS) from 2001 to 2005. In 2003, Pierson was the recipient of the Austin Film Festival's Distinguished Screenwriter Award. Screenwriter Brian Helgeland presented him with the Award. He was a consultant on Mad Men, co-writing (with Matthew Weiner) the fifth episode of its fifth season, "Signal 30", a member of the teaching staff of the Sundance Institute, and artistic director of the American Film Institute.

Pierson married his wife Helene in 1990 and had two children. He died on July 22, 2012, in his home in Los Angeles.

== Filmography ==
=== Television ===
Year	Title	Director	Writer	Notes
1962	Have Gun – Will Travel	Yes	Yes	
1962–1963	Naked City	No	Yes	
1963	Route 66	Yes	Yes	Episode "Build Your Houses with Their Backs to the Sea"
1970	The 42nd Annual Academy Awards	No	Yes	
1971	Nichols	Yes	Yes	Also creator
1973	The Bold Ones: The New Doctors	Yes	Yes	Episode "And Other Springs I May Not See"
1985	Alfred Hitchcock Presents	Yes	No	
2010	The Good Wife	No	Yes	Episode "Hybristophilia"
2012	Mad Men	No	Yes	Episode "Signal 30"

TV movies

Year	Title	Director	Writer
1971	The Neon Ceiling	Yes	No
1973	Amanda Fallon	No	Yes
1980	Haywire	No	Yes
1990	Somebody Has to Shoot the Picture	Yes	No
1992	Citizen Cohn	Yes	No
1994	Lakota Woman: Siege at Wounded Knee	Yes	No
1995	Truman	Yes	No
2000	Dirty Pictures	Yes	No
2001	Conspiracy	Yes	No
2003	Soldier's Girl	Yes	No
2004	Paradise	Yes	No

=== Feature film ===
Year	Title	Director	Writer
1965	Cat Ballou	No	Yes
1967	The Happening	No	Yes
1967	Cool Hand Luke	No	Yes
1970	The Looking Glass War	Yes	Yes
1971	The Anderson Tapes	No	Yes
1975	Dog Day Afternoon	No	Yes
1976	A Star Is Born	Yes	Yes
1978	King of the Gypsies	Yes	Yes
1989	In Country	No	Yes
1990	Presumed Innocent	No	Yes

Non-profit organization positions
Preceded by Robert Rehme	President of Academy of Motion Pictures, Arts and Sciences; 2001-2005	Succeeded by Sid Ganis
