= The Bold Ones: The Protectors =

American television series (1969-1970)

- The cast of The Bold Ones: The Protectors
- Also known as: The Protectors; Deadlock; The Law Enforcers
- Created by: William Sackheim; Roland Wolpert
- Directed by: Daryl Duke; Lamont Johnson
- Starring: Leslie Nielsen; Hari Rhodes
- Country of origin: United States
- No. of seasons: 1
- No. of episodes: 7 (including 1 pilot movie)

Production
- Producer: Jack Laird
- Running time: 45–48 minutes

Original release
- Network: NBC
- Release: February 22, 1969 – March 8, 1970

The Bold Ones: The Protectors (also known as The Protectors, Deadlock or The Law Enforcers) is an American crime drama series that aired on NBC from 1969 to 1970; it lasted for seven episodes (including one pilot movie).

The Protectors was part of The Bold Ones, a rotating series of dramas that also included The New Doctors (with E. G. Marshall), The Lawyers (with Burl Ives) and The Senator (with Hal Holbrook). This was the shortest of the four series.

== Overview ==
The series stars Leslie Nielsen as Deputy Chief Sam Danforth, the deputy chief of police in a volatile California city. He is a conservative law and order type who is brought in from Cleveland to try to keep the lid on. Nielsen often has run-ins with the city's idealistic, liberal black DA, William Washburn played by Hari Rhodes.

== Cast ==
- Leslie Nielsen as Deputy Police Chief Sam Danforth the deputy chief of police in a volatile California city
- Hari Rhodes as the city's idealistic, liberal black District Attorney William Washburn, who often has run-ins with Sam Danforth.

=== Guest stars ===
- Aldo Ray made one appearance as Edward Logan in the pilot movie: "Deadlock"
- Max Julien made one appearance as Coley Walker in the pilot movie: "Deadlock"
- Edmond O'Brien made one appearance as Warden Millbank in: "If I Should Wake Before I Die"
- James Broderick made one appearance as Father Hayes in: "A Thing Not of God"
- Frank Maxwell made two appearances as Mayor Alesi in: "The Carrier" and "A Case of Good Whiskey at Christmas Time"
- Michael Bell made two appearances as Sergeant Jack Miller in: "Draw a Straight Man" and "A Case of Good Whiskey at Christmas Time"

== Episodes ==
No.	Title	Directed by	Written by	Original release date
0	"Deadlock"	Lamont Johnson	Story by : William Sackheim and Roland Wolpert; Teleplay by : Chester Krumholz and Robert E. Thompson	22 February 1969
100-minute Pilot episode. Guest starring Aldo Ray, Dana Elcar, Ruby Dee, Beverly Todd, Max Julien, James McEachin, Mel Stewart, and Fred Williamson.
1	"A Case of Good Whiskey at Christmas Time"	Robert Day	Story by : Robert I. Holt; Teleplay by : L.T. Bentwood and Betty Deveraux	28 September 1969
The builder of a high profile public housing project is murdered just as construction begins. District Attorney William Washburn has to walk a delicate line when he uncovers massive corruption during his investigation, as the publicity could jeopardize the project and lead to civil unrest. Guest starring Edward Andrews, Charles Drake, Amy Thomson, Lorraine Gary, and Fred Williamson.
2	"If I Should Wake Before I Die"	Daryl Duke	Story by : Jerrold Freedman; Teleplay by : Adrian Spies	26 October 1969
Washburn decides to retry a well-spoken and charming convicted murderer who has managed to avoid execution for seven years through appeals he filed and argued on his own behalf. Washburn's case hinges on a newly discovered poem the man wrote the night of his first scheduled execution, which Washburn believes the jury will interpret as a confession. Guest starring Edmond O'Brien, Robert Drivas, Gene Evans, and Milton Selzer.
3	"Draw a Straight Man"	William Hale	Sam Washington	14 December 1969
Deputy Police Chief Danforth is under the microscope when accusations of police corruption surface after a series of robberies. Guest starring Michael Bell, Celeste Yarnall, Janine Gray, William Mims, Tom Reese and Peter Brocco.
4	"The Carrier"	Frank Arrigo	Story by : Paul Stein and Charles Watts; Teleplay by : Mark Rodgers and Barry Trivers	11 January 1970
The death of a man carrying a plague from Asia leads the DA's office to a human trafficking ring. Guest starring Louise Sorel, Clifford David, Barbara Babcock, Frank Maxwell, Peter Mamakos, and Joseph V. Perry.
5	"A Thing Not of God"	Jerrold Freedman	Story by : Mark Rodgers and Harold Livingston; Teleplay by : Mark Rodgers	1 February 1970
The DA's office gets involved with a case involving a church and an Army deserter who sought refuge there. Guest starring James Broderick, Lynn Carlin, John Rubinstein, Garry Walberg, and Peter Brocco.
6	"Memo from the Class of '76"	Daryl Duke	Story by : Jerrold Freedman; Teleplay by : Benjamin Masselink	8 March 1970
The DA's office comes under the scrutiny of a group of angry parents when the police arrest a busload of students as part of a drug bust. Guest starring Norma Crane, Billy Gray, Peter Hooten, William Wintersole, Steve Pendleton, and Stuart Nisbet.

== Home media ==
On September 15, 2015, Timeless Media Group released The Bold Ones: The Protectors- The Complete Series on DVD in Region 1.
