= Hari Rhodes =

American actor and author

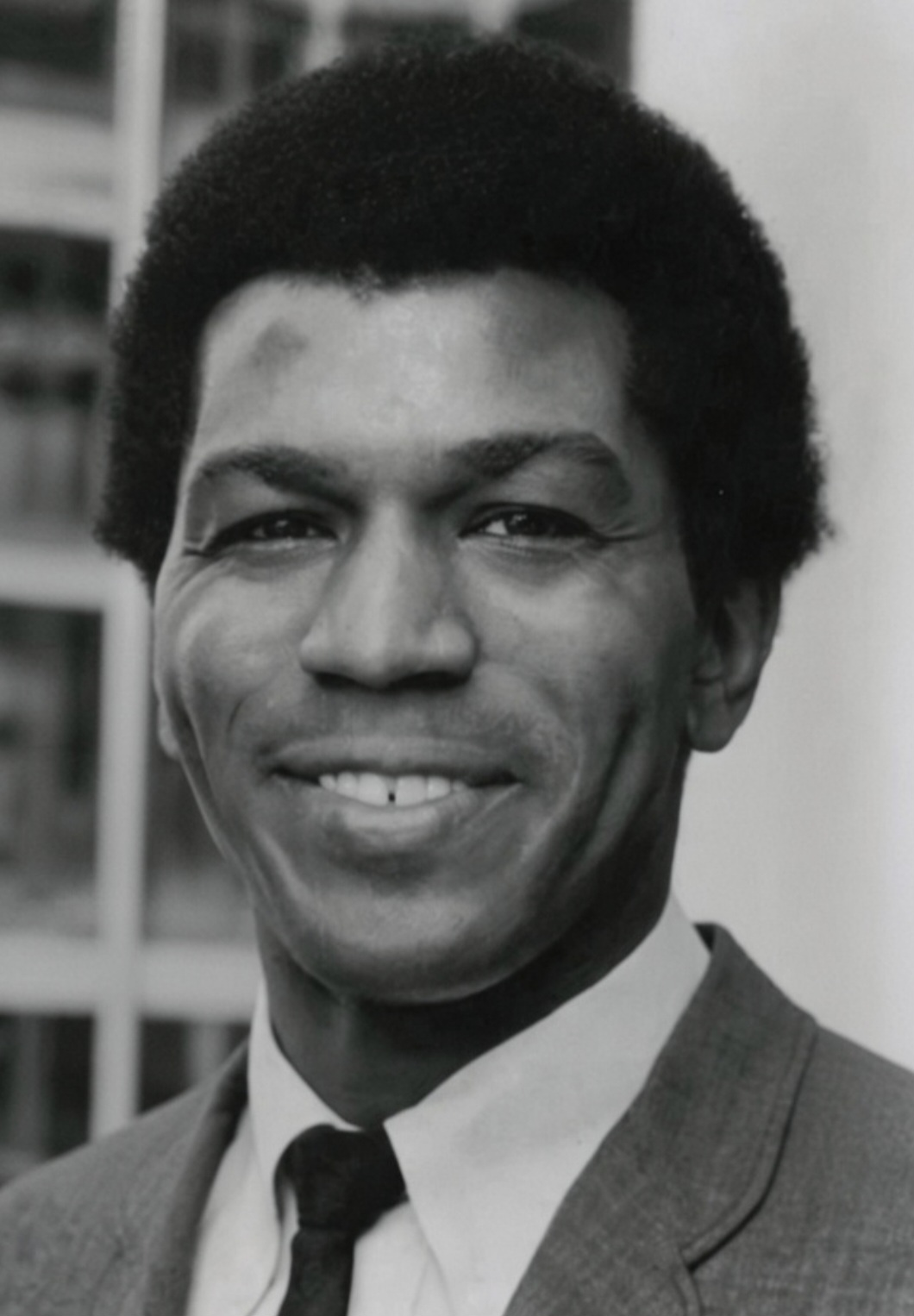
- Rhodes in The Bold Ones: The Protectors, 1969
- Born: April 10, 1932; Cincinnati, Ohio, U.S.
- Died: January 15, 1992 (aged 59); Canoga Park, Los Angeles, California, U.S.
- Other name: Harry Rhodes
- Occupations: Actor; Author
- Years active: 1957–1992

Hari Rhodes (April 10, 1932 – January 15, 1992) was an American author and actor whose career spanned three decades beginning in 1957.

He was sometimes billed as Harry Rhodes, and appeared in 66 films and television programs, such as ABC's 1963 TV medical drama series about psychiatry Breaking Point.

== Early life ==
Rhodes was born April 10, 1932, in Cincinnati, Ohio. When he was 15, Rhodes spent two months learning to copy his mother's signature, and forged it on enlistment papers to join the U.S. Marine Corps.

In the Marines, Rhodes was a member of his camp's judo team for two years. He eventually gained the rank of sergeant and served in Korea, where he led a reconnaissance platoon behind enemy lines.

"The time I got wounded at the Chosin Reservoir, a Chinese came running toward me," Rhodes told TV Guide. "My Thompson submachine gun was unloaded. I threw it down so he wouldn't shoot. His face almost smiled. He had his bayonet on my chest. He began slashing my arms. I got him with an 8-inch knife."

== Acting career ==
In 1960, Rhodes appeared in five television series: General Electric Theater, hosted by Ronald Reagan; The Detectives Starring Robert Taylor, Have Gun - Will Travel, starring Richard Boone, The Westerner, starring Brian Keith; and in two episodes of Adventures in Paradise, starring Gardner McKay. In 1961, he was cast in an episode of ABC's Hawaii-based drama, Follow the Sun.

From 1966 to 1969, Rhodes was a regular on Daktari as Mike Makula. In 1969, he starred in the short-lived series The Bold Ones: The Protectors. His most notable television role came in 1977 in the ABC miniseries, Roots, in which he was cast as a leader of Kunta Kinte's village. He had a pioneering role as an African-American in science-fiction television. His portrayal of one Lt. Ernie Travers, member of a lunar exploration team in the "Moonstone" episode of The Outer Limits (1964), antedated Nichelle Nichols' portrayal of a black member (Lt. Uhura) of a space exploration crew on Star Trek. In 1985, he appeared as character Mr. Wanda in Magnum P.I. in the episode titled "Old Acquaintance".

His early film roles included appearances in The Nun and the Sergeant (1962), Drums of Africa (1963), Shock Corridor (1963), The Satan Bug (1965), and Mirage (1965). In 1966, he played a supporting role as Captain Davis in the successful suspense-comedy motion picture Blindfold, starring Rock Hudson and Claudia Cardinale. He also played Mr. MacDonald, who aids Caesar in Conquest of the Planet of the Apes (1972), and was the star of the blaxploitation film Detroit 9000 (1973). His later film credits included Mayday at 40,000 Feet! (1976), The Hostage Heart (1977), Coma (1978), and the Burt Reynolds cop thriller Sharky's Machine (1981).

== Acting and racism's effect on his writing ==
Rhodes' first television role was in a 1957 episode of Dick Powell's Zane Grey Theater that starred Sammy Davis Jr. The role came just one year after Rhodes had received a rude lesson in racial prejudice.

"I read about a training program a major studio had for grooming people for 'stardom.' Being naïve about the system, I got on the phone and called the man in charge and asked if he would interview me, and he told me to come around to the studio," Rhodes told TV Guide in 1968. "I said, 'By the way, I think I should tell you that I am a Negro.' He said, 'Don't waste your time – we don't take Negroes in this program.' I hung up the phone. Almost tore the cradle off the thing."

In 1965, he published a novel based on his experiences in the Marine Corps at the last black Marine Corps Recruit Depot at Montford Point called A Chosen Few. The novel was described as "an explosive personal portrait of what (Rhodes) saw and lived through in the heart of the American South in the last all-Negro Marine boot camp." The novel's uneducated hero remarks, "Bitterness ... is a consuming, cancerous quality out of which comes nothing but self-destruction, while out of an anger can come many constructive things, if nothing more than the drive to get something done."

Rhodes later penned two unpublished novels: Harambee, about a man with a plan to liquidate the world's entire Caucasian population, and Land of Odds, about Hollywood.

Rhodes told TV Guide that writing served as his safety valve. "I'd rather be writing my own than reading somebody else's. I have no need for it." Rhodes said.

== Filmography ==
Films
Year	Title	Role	Notes
1957	Burden of Truth	Joe Hamilton	
1958	The Lost Missile	Black Man At Piano	
1960	This Rebel Breed	Claude	
1961	The Fiercest Heart	Hendrik	
1961	Return to Peyton Place	Arthur	Uncredited
1962	The Nun and the Sergeant	Hall	
1963	Drums of Africa	Kasongo	
1963	Shock Corridor	Trent	
1965	The Satan Bug	Lieutenant Johnson	
1965	Taffy and the Jungle Hunter	Kahli	
1965	Mirage	Lieutenant Franken	
1966	Blindfold	Captain Davis	
1972	Conquest of the Planet of the Apes	Malcolm MacDonald	
1973	Detroit 9000	Sergeant Jesse Williams	
1978	Coma	Dr. Morelind	
1981	Sharky's Machine	"Highball Mary"	

Television
Year	Title	Role	Notes
1959	Zane Grey Theatre	Troop Andrew	Mission – Season 4 Episode 7
1960	General Electric Theater	Jinks	The Patsy – Season 8 Episode 21
1960	The Detectives	Tempus	Longshot – Season 2 Episode 2
1960	Adventures in Paradise	Ombomb / Timi	The Death-Divers – Season 1 Episode 28, Open for Diving – Season 2 Episode 1
1960	Have Gun – Will Travel	Ansel James	The Shooting of Jessie May – Season 4 Episode 8
1960	The Westerner	Jones	Line Camp – Season 1 Episode 10
1961	King of Diamonds	Otis Movito	Alias Willie Hogan – Season 1 Episode 5
1961	Follow the Sun	M'Boto	The Hunters – Season 1 Episode 9
1963	Wide Country	Chuck Crowley	The Man Who Ran Away – Season 1 Episode 19
1963	My Three Sons	Guard	The Clunky Kid – Season 3 Episode 22
1963	The Eleventh Hour	Charley	A Medicine Man in This Day and Age – Season 1 Episode 29
1963	The Alfred Hitchcock Hour	Patrolman	Season 1 Episode 32: Death of a Cop
1963	The Fugitive	Dan Digby	Decision in the Ring – Season 1 Episode 6
1963	Breaking Point	Detective Shaw	Whatsoever Things I hear – Season 1 Episode 10
1964	Channing	Cicero	Another Kind of Music – Season 1 Episode 17
1964	Arrest and Trial	Detective Victor Hammerlund	People in Glass Houses – Season 1 Episode 20
1964	The Outer Limits	Lieutenant Ernie Travers	Moonstone – Season 1 Episode 24
1964	Wagon Train	Jefferson Washington Freeman	The Stark Bluff Story – Season 7 Episode 29
1964	Rawhide	Corporal Dunbar	Incident at Seven Fingers – Season 6 Episode 30
1964	Peyton Place	Mr. Massey, Prison Parole Officer	Season 1 Episode 30
1962–1965	Ben Casey	Gunner Garrison	To a Grand and Natural Finale – Season 1 Episode 23 For Jimmy, the Best of Everything – Season 4 Episode 6 Because of the Needle, the Haystack Was Lost – Season 5 Episode 5
1966	I Spy	Scott #2	Will the Real Good Guys Please Stand Up? – Season 2 Episode 8
1966–1969	Daktari	Mike Makula / Mike	
1970	The Name of the Game	Captain Adzuwe	The Skin Game – Season 2 Episode 21
1969–1970	The Bold Ones: The Protectors	District Attorney William Washburn / Leslie Washburn	
1970	Mannix	Minji Obuko	The World Between – Season 4 Episode 8
1971	Mission: Impossible	George Corley	Cat's Paw – Season 5 Episode 15
1971	Earth II	Dr. Loren Huxley	TV movie
1972	O'Hara, U.S. Treasury	Rouchinet	Operation: White Fire – Season 1 Episode 17
1973	Trouble Comes to Town	Horace Speare	TV movie
1970–1973	The F.B.I	Ginger Dodds / Ormond	The Deadly Pact – Season 6 Episode 8 Fatal Reunion – Season 9 Episode 7
1973	A Dream for Christmas	Reverend Will Douglas	TV movie
1974	To Sir, with Love	Paul Cameron	TV movie
1974	Born Free	Dr. Alan Kamante	Elephant Trouble – Seasons 1, 2
1974	Police Surgeon	Gret Jarrett	Episode name: The Militant
1974	The Six Million Dollar Man	Karl	The Peeping Blonde – Season 2 Episode 11
1975	Cop on the Beat	Dr. Belding	TV movie, Uncredited
1975	Matt Helm	Seki	Matt Helm – Season 1 Episode 0
1975–1976	Cannon	Mayor Jesse Satterfield / Lieutenant Dexter	The Investigator – season 4 Episode 20, Revenge – Season 5 Episode 18 / Snapshot – Season 5 Episode 21
1972–1976	The Streets of San Francisco	Floyd Marsden / Karpa / Harry Gates / Charlie Johnson	
1976	Mayday at 40,000 Feet!	Belson	TV movie
1977	Roots	Brima Cesay	Season 1 Episode 1
1976–1977	Most Wanted	Mayor Dan Stoddard	
1977	The Hostage Heart	Don Harris	TV movie - credited as Harry Rhodes
1977	The Hardy Boys/Nancy Drew Mysteries	Lieutenant Astor	Mystery of the Hollywood Phantom, Part II – Season 2 Episode 5
1977	Charlie's Angels	Ben Brody	Sam Davis Jr. Kidnap Caper – Season 2 Episode 12
1978	A Woman Called Moses	Tavwell Robinson	Season 1 Episode 1, Episode 2
1978	The Bionic Woman	Chief Inspector Ball	The Antidote – Season 3 Episode 14
1978	Logan's Run	Samuel	Turnabout – Season 1 Episode 13
1978	CHiPs	Father	Crack-Up – Season 1 Episode 21
1973–1978	Police Story	Sonny DuPrix / L.C. Madden / Borden Gampu / Otis Spencer	
1976–1978	Quincy M.E.	Deputy Mayor Collins / Dr. Phil Moran	Go Fight City Hall... to the Death – Season 1 Episode 1 Death by Good Intentions – Season 4 Episode 4
1979	Wonder Woman	Sheldon Como	Going, Going, Gone – Season 3 Episode 13
1979	Backstairs at the White House	Coates, The Butler	
1979	Salvage 1	Pierre	Operation Breakout – Season 1 Episode 8
1979	The Runaways	Hackett	Wrong Way Street – Season 2 Episode 2
1979	The White Shadow	Harmon Reese	The Cross-Town Hustle – Season 2 Episode 3
1980	Beyond Westworld	Commander Riley	Take-Over – Season 1 Episode 5
1981	Judgment Day	Joseph Pierson	TV movie
1983	The Powers of Matthew Star	Keating	Swords and Quests – Season 1 Episode 21
1984	Automan	Rollie Dumont	Flashes and Ashes – Season 1 Episode 6
1984	Dynasty	Detective Taylor	The Voice: Part 3 – Season 4 Episode 22, The Engagement – Season 4 Episode 25
1984	Cover Up	Jourdan	The Million Dollar Face – Season 1 Episode 2
1985	The Fall Guy	Dr. Hubbard	Rockabye Baby – Season 4 Episode 19
1985	Magnum, P.I.	Prison Guard / Mr. Wanda	A Pretty Good Dancing Chicken – season 5 Episode 22, Old Acquaintance – Season 6 Episode 2
1990	L.A. Law	Federal Judge Emmanuel	The Last Gasp – Season 4 Episode 22
1990	Donor	Harry	TV movie
1992	Murder Without Motive: The Edmund Perry Story	Unknown	TV movie, (final film role)

== Death ==
Hari Rhodes died of a heart attack in January 1992, a few months before the premiere of his final project, the made-for-TV feature Murder Without Motive: The Edmund Perry Story.

== Bibliography ==
- A Chosen Few. Bantam Books, 1965.
- The Hollow and the Human. Vantage, 1976
