= The Bold Ones: The Senator =

American television series (1970-1971)

- Hal Holbrook as Hays Stowe, the main character of The Bold Ones: The Senator
- Created by: S.S. Schweitzer
- Directed by: Ernest Kinoy; Daryl Duke; John Badham
- Starring: Hal Holbrook; Sharon Acker; Cindy Eilbacher; Michael Tolan
- Country of origin: United States
- No. of seasons: 1
- No. of episodes: 9 (including 1 pilot movie)

Production
- Producer: David Levinson
- Editors: Douglas Stewart; Michael Economou
- Camera setup: Single-camera
- Running time: 45–48 minutes

Original release
- Network: NBC
- Release: March 21, 1970 – February 28, 1971

The Bold Ones: The Senator (also known as The Senator) is an American political television drama series that aired on NBC from 1970 through 1971, lasting for nine episodes (including one pilot movie). The series stars Hal Holbrook as Senator Hays Stowe, an idealistic crusader of political and social issues.

The Senator was part of The Bold Ones, a rotating series of dramas that also included The New Doctors (with E. G. Marshall), The Lawyers (with Burl Ives), and The Protectors (with Leslie Nielsen).

As a group of dramas, The Bold Ones was nominated for nine Emmy Awards and won five awards. It was also nominated for a Golden Globe for Best Drama TV Show. In 1971, Holbrook won an Emmy Award for Outstanding Continued Performance by an Actor in a Leading Role in a Dramatic Series for his role in the series.

The series was based on an earlier television movie, A Clear and Present Danger.

== Cast ==
=== Main cast ===
- Hal Holbrook as Senator Hays Stowe, an idealistic crusader of political and social issues who frequently came into conflict with old-line politicians and entrenched special interest groups.
- Sharon Acker as Erin Stowe, Hays' wife.
- Cindy Eilbacher as Norma Stowe, Hays' daughter.
- Michael Tolan as Jordan Boyle, Hays' administrative aide.

=== Guest stars ===
- Ed Binns made two appearances as Arthur in the episodes: "A Continual Roar of Musketry: Part 1 and Part 2"
- Dana Elcar made one appearance as Collie Ford in "Some Day, They'll Elect a President"
- Michael C. Gwynne made one appearance as Whitney in: "Power Play"
- Kevin Hagen made one appearance as Joseph Lick in: "The Day the Lion Died"
- Bernie Hamilton made two appearances as Dr. Edwards in the episodes: "A Continual Roar of Musketry: Part 1 and Part 2"
- Lincoln Kilpatrick made one appearance as Isaac Johnson in: "A Single Blow of the Sword"
- Randolph Mantooth made two appearances as the young National Guard officer in the episodes: "A Continual Roar of Musketry: Part 1 and Part 2"
- Burgess Meredith made one appearance as State Party Chairman Mallon in: "Power Play"
- John Randolph made three appearances as Governor Keler including the episodes: "A Continual Roar of Musketry: Part 1 and Part 2"
- Louise Sorel made one appearance as Mary in the episode: "George Washington Told a Lie"

== Episodes ==
=== Pilot (1970) ===
Title	Directed by	Written by	Original release date
A Clear and Present Danger	James Goldstone	S : S.S. Schweitzer; T : Howard Rodman; S/T : A.J. Russell	March 21, 1970
When an old friend of the family dies from emphysema, the son of a U.S. Senator takes up the crusade against air pollution.

=== Season 1 (1970–71) ===
No.	Title	Directed by	Written by	Original release date
1	"To Taste of Death But Once"	Daryl Duke	S : Preston Wood; T : Joel Oliansky	September 13, 1970
Despite a threat on his life, Senator Stowe accepts an invitation from Garbury College to speak about the practical uses of political dissent.
2	"The Day the Lion Died"	Daryl Duke	Leon Tokatyan	October 4, 1970
Junior Senator Stowe is dealt a severe rebuke from the powerful Armed Services Committee Chairman Senator Homer Wydell when he tries to investigate a controversial and secretive military contract. When the elder senator begins exhibiting symptoms of dementia, Stowe has to make a tough choice about whether or not to risk ruining his own career by publicly questioning Wydell's competency before he leaves to chair a high-stakes international arms conference.
3	"Power Play"	Jerrold Freedman	Ernest Kinoy	November 1, 1970
When Stowe throws his support behind a reform candidate as party nominee for a special election, he suddenly finds himself short of votes to secure passage of his signature education subsidy legislation. He risks alienating his grassroots supporters by considering a deal offered by State Party Chairman Mallon, who is desperate to nominate a wealthy but unqualified candidate.
4	"A Continual Roar of Musketry: Part 1"	Robert Day	David W. Rintels	November 22, 1970
Senator Stowe chairs a commission that is investigating the shooting deaths of two college students by National Guard troops during an anti-war protest at a university. His task is complicated by the fact that the students, the administrators and the National Guardsmen all give different versions of what happened.
5	"A Continual Roar of Musketry: Part 2"	Robert Day	David W. Rintels	November 29, 1970
As key event participants give testimony, Senator Stowe tries to reconcile differences in conflicting testimony, such as the existence of student snipers and whether or not an order was given to arm weapons, to determine if the National Guard's response was appropriate and to what extent the protestors were responsible.
6	"Some Day, They'll Elect a President"	John Badham	Leon Tokatyan	January 17, 1971
As part of an effort to bring a new power plant to his state, Senator Stowe's aide Jordan Boyle makes a major error in judgment by drafting and signing an introduction letter to a businessman who was later revealed to be a high-ranking member of the mob.
7	"George Washington Told a Lie"	Daryl Duke	S : Bontche Schweig; T : Joel Oliansky	February 7, 1971
Senator Stowe proudly announces final approval for the construction of a long awaited hydroelectric dam in his home state. However, protesters bring to his attention a previously overlooked detail that the project will forcefully displace a tribe of 76 Native Americans from their reservation because of a technicality in their treaty, which was written in 1792 by George Washington.
8	"A Single Blow of a Sword"	John M. Badham	Jerrold Freedman	February 28, 1971
An opponent of the welfare system who works for the Office of Enforcement Operations attempts to derail Senator Stowe's Inner City Self Help Act legislation by publishing a report containing evidence of misappropriation of funds by an administrator Stowe personally selected for a similar anti-poverty agency.

== Home media ==
Timeless Media Group released The Bold Ones: The Senator- The Complete Series on DVD in Region 1 on June 16, 2015.

== Awards ==
=== Primetime Emmy Award ===
- Outstanding Achievement in Film Editing for Entertainment Programming - For a Series or a Single Program of a Series – Michael Economou (For episode "A Continual Roar of Musketry", parts I & II)
- Outstanding Continued Performance by an Actor in a Leading Role in a Dramatic Series – Hal Holbrook
- Outstanding Directorial Achievement in Drama - A Single Program of a Series with Continuing Characters and/or Theme – Daryl Duke (For episode "The Day the Lion Died")
- Outstanding Series - Drama – David Levinson
- Outstanding Writing Achievement in Drama – Joel Oliansky (For episode "To Taste of Death But Once")
