= The Bold Ones: The Lawyers =

American television series (1968-1972)

- Cast
- Also known as: The Lawyers
- Created by: Roy Huggins (credited as John Thomas James)
- Directed by: Douglas Heyes
- Starring: Burl Ives; Joseph Campanella; James Farentino
- Opening theme: Pete Rugolo
- Composer: Stanley Wilson
- Country of origin: United States
- Original language: English
- No. of seasons: 3
- No. of episodes: 29 (Including two pilot movies) (list of episodes)

Production
- Executive producer: Roy Huggins
- Producer: Jo Swerling Jr.
- Camera setup: Single-camera
- Running time: 45–48 minutes

Original release
- Network: NBC
- Release: December 10, 1968 – February 13, 1972

The Bold Ones: The Lawyers (or The Lawyers) is an American legal drama that aired for three seasons on NBC from September 1968 through February 1972.

== Synopsis ==
The series stars Burl Ives as Walt Nichols, a respected attorney partnered with brothers Brian and Neil Darrell (Joseph Campanella and James Farentino), who run a prestigious law firm in Los Angeles.

The Lawyers was part of The Bold Ones, a rotating series of dramas that also included The New Doctors (with E. G. Marshall), The Protectors (with Leslie Nielsen) and The Senator (with Hal Holbrook). It was nominated for three Emmy awards and won two of them. Pat Hingle and Walter Brooke each made two guest appearances, and had previously appeared in The New Doctors. Kermit Murdock also made two guest appearances, and later appeared in cameo roles in The Senator.

During the production of the first series of 8 episodes, James Farentino complained vociferously to the producers about the scripts and was suspended for three weeks, missing two shows. Later, near the end of the third series, he announced he was leaving of his own volition. The series was not renewed for a fourth season.

== Cast ==
=== Main cast ===
- Burl Ives as Walter "Walt" Nichols, an attorney for the firm of Nichols, Darrell and Darrell. (appeared in 26 episodes and both films)
- Joseph Campanella as Brian Darrell, the older brother who helps Walt with his cases. (appeared in 24 episodes and the second film)
- James Farentino as Neil Darrell, the younger brother who, though an attorney, occasionally did investigations for the firm. (appeared in 19 episodes and both films)

=== Recurring characters ===
- Ramon Bieri as Judge Hartman (appeared in 2 episodes)
- Dana Elcar as District Attorney Shannon (appeared in 2 episodes)
- Todd Martin as Deputy District Attorney Jeff Skinner (appeared in 5 episodes)
- John Milford as Lt. Paul Hewitt (appeared in 7 episodes)
- George Murdock as District Attorney William Braddock (appeared in 2 episodes)
- Herbert Nelson made four appearances as judges
- David Spielberg as Deputy DA Vernon Wahlburg (appeared in 3 episodes)
- Len Wayland played three diffrerent police lieutenants

== Episodes ==
Season	Episodes	Originally released	
Season	Episodes	First released	Last released
Pilots	2	December 10, 1968	March 11, 1969
1	8	September 21, 1969	February 15, 1970
2	8	September 27, 1970	February 28, 1971
3	11	September 19, 1971	February 13, 1972

=== Pilots ===
No.	Title	Directed by	Written by	Original release date
1	"The Sound of Anger"	Michael Ritchie	Roy Huggins and Dick Nelson	December 10, 1968
Two teenagers who have been engaged in pre-marital sex become the prime suspects when the girl's disapproving father is mysteriously murdered. NOTE: Guy Stockwell plays Brian Darrell in this first pilot film. He was replaced in the second film and subsequent series by Joseph Campanella.
2	"The Whole World Is Watching"	Richard A. Colla	Richard Levinson and William Link	March 11, 1969
After a university police officer is killed during a campus protest, student activist Gil Bennett is arrested for the murder. Milking this turn of events for his cause, Bennett refuses to testify about his innocence. The lawyers now must find the young man's one hope; the only witness to the crime who has his own motive for not coming forward.

=== Season 1 (1969–70) ===
No. overall	No. in season	Title	Directed by	Written by	Original release date
1	1	"A Game of Chance"	Douglas Heyes	Story by : Whit Masterson; Teleplay by : Roy Huggins (as John Thomas James)	September 21, 1969
A corrupt small-town detective (Steve Ihnat) is the target of junior partner Neil Darrell, who's out to expose the officer's abuse. Sandra Smith and Leslie Perkins also star.
2	2	"The People Against Ortega"	Richard T. Heffron	Story by : William Pearson; Teleplay by : Dick Nelson	October 12, 1969
Brian's client (Frank Ramirez), wrongfully convicted of a capital murder many years ago, accidentally kills the wife of the district attorney (Robert Webber) during a failed escape attempt shortly before he is cleared of the original crime. Brian continues representing his client during the trial for the accidental killing, even though the DA and his wife were good friends of Brian's. John Randolph and Nina Shipman also star. James Farentino does not appear in this episode.
3	3	"The Crowd Pleaser"	Vincent Sherman	Story by : David Giler and Roy Huggins (as John Thomas James); Teleplay by : Frank Fenton	November 2, 1969
The lawyers are shocked when their client, a cocky real estate agent (Mel Torme) accused of murdering a prostitute, gleefully admits to the crime during a private party celebrating his acquittal. When another man (Georg Stanford Brown) is subsequently convicted of the crime and faces the death penalty, Neil makes an agonizing decision that could sacrifice his career.
4	4	"The Rockford Riddle"	Richard T. Heffron	Story by : F.D. Averno; Teleplay by : Matthew Howard	November 16, 1969
Walt volunteers to represent a mentally ill homeless man (Charles Aidman) who has just admitted to murdering a peer, on the condition that the man divulge the facts of a previous murder for which Walt represented him several years earlier; in that case, the man admitted to murdering his wife's rival when his wife (Claudine Longet) was on trial for the murder, only to recant his guilt immediately after she was acquitted. Charles Lampkin and Leslie Perkins also star. James Farentino does not appear. NOTE: In 1976, Longet was acquitted after shooting and killing her boyfriend, skier Spider Sabich.
5	5	"Shriek of Silence"	Fernando Lamas	Story by : Roy Huggins (as John Thomas James); Teleplay by : Robert Foster and Roy Huggins (as John Thomas James)	November 30, 1969
The lawyers represent a front-running gubernatorial candidate (Craig Stevens) who is framed for the murder of a female campaign worker by his former campaign chairman (Morgan Sterne), a man forced to resign because the candidate found out he was gay. His defense becomes a lot more complicated when a witness (Richard Van Vleet) clams to witness the candidate moving the body out of his apartment and into a park as part of an ill-conceived plan to avoid being linked to the crime. Walter Brooke and Kermit Murdock also star.
6	6	"Trial of a Mafioso"	Richard Benedict	Robert Hamner	January 4, 1970
The lawyers travel to Atlanta to represent an incarcerated former mobster (Richard Conte) who has provided key testimony against other mob bosses while in prison and is ultimately exonerated after an eventful retrial. Although their client has arranged for a helicopter to take him out of the country upon release, the lawyers are given the dangerous task of transporting him from the courthouse to the remote location where the pickup will take place. Linda Marsh and Frank Campanella (older brother of Joseph Campanella) also star.
7	7	"Point of Honor"	Gene Levitt	Roy Huggins (as John Thomas James)	January 25, 1970
Brian gets himself involved in a murder case, and now privileged communication between a lawyer and his client has become a key issue. Veronica Cartwright, Paul Stevens, and Roger Davis also star. James Farentino does not appear.
8	8	"The Shattered Image"	Richard C. Bennett	Story by : George Zuckerman; Teleplay by : William D. Gordon	February 15, 1970
In a small rural California town, Ted Hollister is charged with the murder of the ward of a rich guardian (Will Geer), and Walt agrees to defend him. Ford Rainey, Karen Huston, and Audrey Totter also star. Joseph Campanella does not appear.

=== Season 2 (1970–71) ===
No. overall	No. in season	Title	Directed by	Written by	Original release date
9	1	"The Verdict"	Alexander Singer	Roy Huggins (as John Thomas James)	September 27, 1970
Despite their differing beliefs on the subject, the lawyers agree to represent an obstetrician (John Kerr) who is charged with murder after performing an illegal abortion. Strongly disagreeing with the jury instructions of the judge (Will Geer) and citing Oliver Wendell Holmes, Neil uses a nonstandard tactic, resulting in a large fine and contempt of court charge. Stephen McNally also stars.
10	2	"Panther in a Cage"	Nicholas Colasanto	Stephen Kandel	October 18, 1970
A member of the Black Panthers (Georg Stanford Brown) is accused of pushing a police detective off a second-story balcony to his death during the execution of a search warrant at their local headquarters. His father (Charles Lampkin), a successful business executive who has been trying to get his son to abandon his extremist lifestyle, hires Nichols, Darrell and Darrell to represent him. Still, their task is complicated by his unwillingness to cooperate or control his emotions in the jury's presence. Gloria Calomee and Frank Campanella also star.
11	3	"Trial of a PFC"	Alexander Singer	Story by : Gloryette Clark; Teleplay by : Frank Fenton	November 8, 1970
Walt represents a decorated Vietnam vet (Peter Duel) accused of murdering his best friend. Jane Elliot, Jared Martin, and Walter Brooke also star. James Farentino does not appear. Ives performs "When Cockleshells Turn Silverbells" and "Where Oh Where Is Pretty Little Susie?" (with Duel); Duel sings "Old Blue."
12	4	"The People Against Doctor Chapman"	Jeannot Szwarc	Jerry Bredouw	December 6, 1970
A Vitenam War Army medic (Monte Markham) assumes the role of a doctor in an isolated hill town. An emergency patient dies in his care and he is accused of murder and practing medicine unlicensed. He claims his commaniding officer, an Army physician, can clear him but he can't be found. Ramon Bieri and Ford Rainey also star. James Farentino does not appear.
13	5	"The Loneliness Racket"	Richard C. Bennett	Gloryette Clark	December 20, 1970
A woman (Phyllis Love) is held for murder when her computer-dating service date turns up dead. Alan Oppenheimer, Marj Dusay, and Clarke Gordon also star.
14	6	"The Search for Leslie Grey"	Richard Benedict	Story by : Matthew Howard; Teleplay by : Howard Browne	January 10, 1971
A business tycoon, Leslie Grey (Charls Aidman), starts to panic when he finds out that his past is now under investigation. Rodolfo Acosta and Leo Gordon also star.
15	7	"The Hyland Confession"	Daniel Petrie	Story by : Roy Huggins (as John Thomas James); Teleplay by : Frank Fenton	January 31, 1971
A young woman (Tisha Sterling), who has her own live-in swami (Clifford David) and a history of psychiatric problems, quickly signs a confession after awakening from a meditation session and finding her successful recording artist husband dead in front of her and the murder weapon in her hand. Her defense hinges on the believability of an interrogation conducted by her psychiatrist (Severn Darden), in which she was under the influence of sodium pentothal. James Farentino does not appear.
16	8	"The Price of Justice"	Alexander Singer	Jack B. Sowards	February 28, 1971
A man accused of murder (Cal Bellini) refuses to talk and defend himself against the charges. His Native American heritage holds the key as to why. Julie Gregg also stars.

=== Season 3 (1971–72) ===
No. overall	No. in season	Title	Directed by	Written by	Original release date
17	1	"The Invasion of Kevin Ireland"	Alexander Singer	Story by : Bret Huggins; Teleplay by : Jack B. Sowards	September 26, 1971
Mistakes on a report from an investigation agency lead to a ruined life for one man (Darren McGavin), who chooses to fight back in court against the agency that admits to no wrongdoing. Kathie Browne, Dana Elcar, John S. Ragin, and Clarke Gordon also star.
18	2	"The Strange Secret of Yermo Hill"	Jeffrey Hayden	Story by : Roy Huggins (as John Thomas James); Teleplay by : William D. Gordon	October 17, 1971
A Marine (Randolph Mantooth), who finds himself in the apartment of a dead girl (Arlene Golonka), is accused of murder but barfly Yermo Hill (Mills Watson) holds a bizarre secret that may solve the mystery of her death. Former California Gov. Edmund G. "Pat" Brown makes a guest appearance.
19	3	"Hall of Justice"	Richard T. Heffron	Robert Hamner	October 31, 1971
The lawyers deal with three cases before the court include an assault against a minor, an alleged mercy killing, and a narcotics charge. Ramon Bieri and James Van Vleet star.
20	4	"In Defense of Ellen McKay"	Alexander Singer	Story by : Roy Huggins (as John Thomas James); Teleplay by : David Chase	November 14, 1971
One of the firm's clients, Ellen McKay (Susan Clark), is about to stand trial for killing her husband. In the middle of all this, Brian finds himself falling for her romantically. John Randolph also stars.
21	5	"By Reason of Insanity"	Alexander Singer	Gloryette Clark	November 28, 1971
The lawyers successfully argue an insanity defense for a young man (Tim Matheson) who is apprehended while collecting the large ransom he demanded after kidnapping a middle-aged man (Charles Aidman) whom he had been obsessed with since the age of thirteen. However, Walt has good reason to fear that the verdict isn't the last chapter of this bizarre saga. Walter Brooke and Nina Shipman also star.
22	6	"Justice Is a Sometime Thing"	Jeffrey Hayden	Robert Hamner	December 21, 1971
A young Hispanic man (A Martinez) is mistaken for an assault suspect when he instinctively comes to the aid of the victim, but panics and runs off upon discovering that the girl he was with has fled because she feared being deported. The lawyers are finally able to locate the girl, but not before the man escapes from jail because he fears his dangerous cellmate and is facing a probable 20-year sentence without the girl's witness testimony. Kermit Murdock also stars.
23	7	"The Letter of the Law"	Douglas Heyes	Douglas Heyes	December 26, 1971
A termianlly ill attorney (Will Geer) must do one last thing--reverse the mistake he made many years before and bring to justice the killer he helped to get away with murder--with an unusual dinner party. Gale Sondergaard, James Olson, Michael Conrad, Carol Wayne, Carla Borelli, and Milton Selzer also star. James Farentino does not appear. NOTE: This episode is a rewrite of the December 1960 episode of Checkmate, entitled "The Murder Game". Also written by Douglas Hayes, and with the same number of actors and former clients, and the same generic type of crimes the lawyer defended against. Names are dissimilar, although the names of the two guilty parties are most similar. In both shows, the organizations (i.e., the law firm and the detective agency) have three starring members, and in both cases, the most junior member is not a part of the show.
24	8	"The Long Morning After: Part 1"	Douglas Heyes	Douglas Heyes	January 9, 1972
The deaths of two women are officially termed an accident and a suicide. Neil, a friend of the suicide (Anne Helm) turns sleuth to prove the deaths were a double murder. Patricia Barry, Bob Corff, Roger Davis, Pat Hingle, Pamela McMyler, and James Wainwright also star.
25	9	"The Long Morning After: Part 2"	Douglas Heyes	Douglas Heyes	January 16, 1972
Neil suspects a powerful industrialist (Pat Hingle, from Part 1) of a double homicide. Ann Helm, Pamela McMyler, Bob Corff, and James Wainwright star.
26	10	"In Sudden Darkness"	David Moessinger	Story by : Gloryette Clark; Teleplay by : Charles E. Israel and David Moessinger	January 30, 1972
Lauren Hazelwood (Sian Barbara Allen) killed her father but, unless she tells her lawyers and the court why, she may face the California gas chamber. Carol Lawrence also stars. James Farentino does not appear.
27	11	"Lisa, I Hardly Knew You"	Alexander Singer	Story by : Roy Huggins (as John Thomas James); Teleplay by : Elick Moll	February 13, 1972
Neil solves the mystery of the death of his fiancee (Tiffany Bolling). Ellen Burstyn also stars.

== Home media ==
On December 1, 2015, Timeless Media Group released The Bold Ones: The Lawyers- The Complete Series on DVD in Region 1.

== Awards and nominations ==
Year	Award	Result	Category	Recipient
1969	Emmy Award	Nominated	Outstanding Single Performance by an Actor in a Supporting Role	Hal Holbrook (For second Pilot episode: "The Whole World Is Watching")
1972	Emmy Award	Nominated	Outstanding Achievement in Film Editing for Entertainment Programming - For a Series or a Single Program of a Series	Richard Bracken, Gloryette Clark, and Terry Williams
1972	Emmy Award	Won	Outstanding Directorial Achievement in Drama - A Single Program of a Series with Continuing Characters and/or Theme	Alexander Singer (For episode "The Invasion of Kevin Ireland")
1972	Emmy Award	Won	Outstanding Achievement in Music Composition - For a Series or a Single Program of a Series	Pete Rugolo (For episode "In Defense of Ellen McKay")
1972	Writers Guild of America Award	Nominated	Best Written Dramatic Episodic Script (Any Length)	Brett Huggins (Story) and Jack B. Sowards (Teleplay) (For episode "The Invasion of Kevin Ireland")
