= The Bold Ones: The New Doctors =

American television series (1969–1973)

- The Cast of The Bold Ones: The New Doctors
- Also known as: The New Doctors
- Created by: Steven Bochco; Paul Mason; Richard Landau
- Directed by: Jeremy Kagan; John Badham; Richard Benedict; Abner Biberman; Michael Caffey; Marvin J. Chomsky; Robert L. Collins; Daryl Duke; Alf Kjellin; Jerry Lewis; Don McDougall; Frank Pierson; Barry Shear; Jud Taylor
- Starring: E. G. Marshall; David Hartman; John Saxon (Season 1-3); Robert Walden (Season 4); Julie Adams (Season 2)
- Opening theme: Billy Goldenberg
- Composers: Stanley Wilson; Lyn Murray
- Country of origin: United States
- Original language: English
- No. of seasons: 4
- No. of episodes: 45 (list of episodes)

Production
- Executive producer: Herbert Hirschman
- Producers: Douglas Benton; Cy Chermak; Joel Rogosin; Robert Scheerer
- Camera setup: Single-camera
- Running time: 45–48 minutes
- Production company: Harbour-UTV

Original release
- Network: NBC
- Release: September 14, 1969 – May 4, 1973

Related
- Ironside; Sarge; Amy Prentiss

The Bold Ones: The New Doctors (also known as The New Doctors) is an American medical drama that lasted for four seasons on NBC, from 1969 to 1973.

== Overview ==
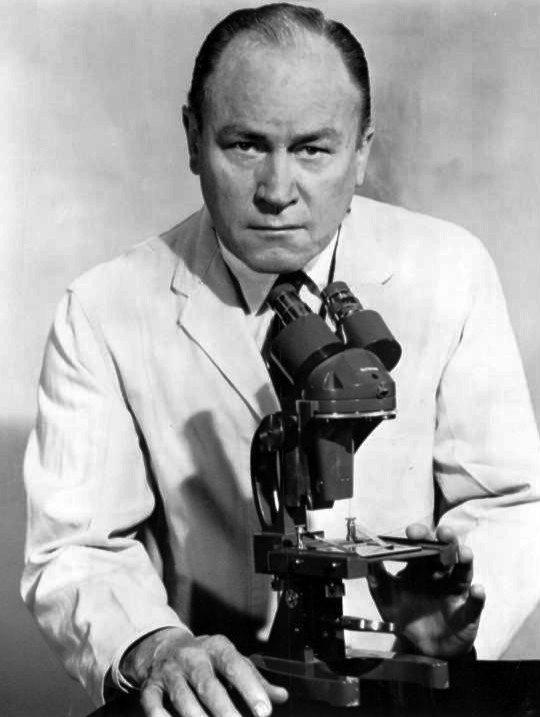
Marshall as David Craig.

The series focuses on the life of Dr. David Craig (E. G. Marshall), an extremely successful neurosurgeon who is so renowned in his field that he is able to open his own very exclusive clinic called The David Craig Institute of New Medicine.

Craig has enlisted two "bold" young medical executives, chief of surgery Dr. Ted Stuart (John Saxon) and Paul Hunter (David Hartman). The character Dr. Stuart was later replaced by Dr. Martin Cohen (Robert Walden).

The New Doctors was part of The Bold Ones, a rotating series of dramas that also included The Protectors (with Leslie Nielsen), The Lawyers (with Burl Ives) and The Senator (with Hal Holbrook). The New Doctors was the only one of the four series to last for the entire run.

David Hartman was nominated for a Golden Globe Award for portraying Paul Hunter on this show.

== Synopsis ==
Together with his two assistants Dr. Paul Hunter and Dr. Ted Stuart, Dr. David Craig encounters an array of medical and psychosocial issues in his own exclusive clinic. The clinic uses then "cutting edge" treatments and is at the forefront of medical research. Medical cases cover a broad spectrum, including organ transplants, mothers with post-partum depression, patients with psychogenic problems, and patients that are difficult to communicate with. Episodes were 60 minutes, and in some cases, Craig becomes involved with patients stricken with rare diseases and unusual circumstances as occurred in later medical dramas such as House and ER.

The closing credits state that "the story, techniques and equipment shown are based on actual developments at the frontiers of medicine."

== Cast and characters ==
- E. G. Marshall as Dr. David Craig, a successful neurosurgeon who has opened his own exclusive clinic called The David Craig Institute of New Medicine.
- John Saxon as Dr. Ted Stuart, the chief of surgery at the clinic (seasons one through three).
- David Hartman as Dr. Paul Hunter, the chief of medicine at the clinic.
- Robert Walden as Dr. Martin Cohen (replaced John Saxon from episode four of season four).
- Julie Adams as Mrs. Lynn Craig, Dr. David Craig's wife (season two only).

== Episodes ==
Season	Episodes	First aired	Last aired
1	10	September 14, 1969	March 1, 1970
2	8	September 20, 1970	February 14, 1971
3	11	September 21, 1971	March 5, 1972
4	16	September 19, 1972	May 4, 1973

After the pilot episode, "To Save a Life", the series became a hit, lasting for three more seasons, ending with the 15th episode of fourth season, "And Other Things I May Not See".

The episode "Five Days in the Death of Sgt. Brown" was a crossover with Ironside; that episode started in Ironside and ended in New Doctors. Both parts were syndicated as Ironside episodes, using the opening and closing credits from part one.

== Home media ==
On March 1, 2016, Timeless Media Group released The Bold Ones: The New Doctors- The Complete Series on DVD in Region 1.

== Guest appearances ==
- Norma Crane made two appearances playing different roles in the episodes: A Threatened Species and Crisis.
- Hazel Scott as Dolly Martin in If I Can't Sing, I'll Listen
- Linda Dangcil also made two appearances playing different roles in the episodes: A Matter of Priorities and To Save a Life.
- Mike Farrell as Dr. Vic Wheelwright in the episode Discovery at Fourteen
- Clu Gulager as Dan Corwin/Matt Smith in the episodes: End Theme and A Threatened Species
- Pat Hingle as Dr. Ben Gold and Walsh in the episodes: Glass Cage and To Save a Life
- Darby Hinton as Hal Parker in This Will Really Kill You
- Ron Howard as Cory Merlino, a fourteen-year-old who discovers that his father is homosexual in Discovery at Fourteen
- Sheila Larken as Liz in the episodes: A Substitute Womb and This Day's Child
- Joanne Linville as Anne Sorenson/Joan Stedman in the episodes: Time Bomb in the Chest and In Dreams They Run
- Carol Lynley as Judith Walters, the daughter of a business tycoon who is concealing an illness in Giants Never Kneel
- Ross Martin as Harry Burke, a man who has violent psychotic episodes and the doctors want to perform psycho surgery in A Purge of Madness
- Tisha Sterling as Casey Woods/Joan in the episodes: This Will Really Kill You and What's the Price of a Pair of Eyes?
- Jane Wyman as Dr. Amanda Fallon in the episodes: Discovery at Fourteen and And Other Things I May Not See (a backdoor pilot for the series "Amanda Fallon" that wasn't picked up by NBC)
