= List of Mannix episodes =

The following is a list of episodes for the detective television series Mannix which aired from 1967 to 1975 in the United States on the CBS television network. The title character, Joe Mannix, is an Armenian-American private investigator played by Mike Connors (who was also of Armenian heritage). Mannix was created by Richard Levinson and William Link and developed by executive producer Bruce Geller (who also created Mission: Impossible).

== Series overview ==
Season	Episodes	Originally released		Rank	Rating
Season	Episodes	First released	Last released	Rank	Rating
1	24	September 16, 1967	March 16, 1968	58	—N/a
2	25	September 28, 1968	April 12, 1969	42	—N/a
3	25	September 27, 1969	March 21, 1970	30	19.9
4	24	September 19, 1970	March 13, 1971	17	21.3
5	24	September 15, 1971	March 8, 1972	7	24.8
6	24	September 17, 1972	March 11, 1973	42	—N/a
7	24	September 16, 1973	March 31, 1974	31	—N/a
8	24	September 22, 1974	April 13, 1975	20	21.6 (Note: Tied with Cannon)

== Episodes ==
=== Season 1 (1967–1968) ===
No. overall	No. in season	Title	Directed by	Written by	Original release date
1	1	"The Name Is Mannix"	Leonard J. Horn	Bruce Geller	September 16, 1967
2	2	"Skid Marks on a Dry Run"	John Meredyth Lucas	John Meredyth Lucas	September 23, 1967
3	3	"Nothing Ever Works Twice"	Murray Golden	Chester Krumholz	September 30, 1967
4	4	"The Many Deaths of Saint Christopher"	John Meredyth Lucas	Barry Oringer	October 7, 1967
5	5	"Make It Like It Never Happened"	Leonard J. Horn	Lee Loeb	October 14, 1967
6	6	"The Cost of a Vacation"	John Meredyth Lucas	Chester Krumholz	October 21, 1967
7	7	"Warning: Live Blueberries"	Vincent McEveety	Story by : Arthur Dales; Teleplay by : Barry Oringer	October 28, 1967
8	8	"Beyond the Shadow of a Dream"	Leonard J. Horn	Laurence Heath	November 4, 1967
9	9	"Huntdown"	Gerald Mayer	Richard Landau	November 18, 1967
10	10	"Coffin for a Clown"	Alexander Singer	Story by : Chester Krumholz & Robert Bloomfield; Teleplay by : Chester Krumholz	November 25, 1967
11	11	"A Catalogue of Sins"	Lee H. Katzin	Walter Brough	December 2, 1967
12	12	"Turn Every Stone"	John Meredyth Lucas	Jeri Emmett	December 9, 1967
13	13	"Run, Sheep, Run"	Gene Reynolds	Howard Browne	December 16, 1967
14	14	"Then the Drink Takes the Man"	Laslo Benedek	Sam Ross	December 30, 1967
15	15	"Falling Star"	Denis Sanders	Dorothy Herald	January 6, 1968
16	16	"License to Kill: Limit Three People"	John Meredyth Lucas	Lew Erwin	January 13, 1968
17	17	"Deadfall: Part 1"	Leonard J. Horn	Chester Krumholz	January 20, 1968
18	18	"Deadfall: Part 2"	Leonard J. Horn	Chester Krumholz	January 27, 1968
19	19	"You Can Get Killed Out There"	Louis Brandt	Dorothy Herald	February 3, 1968
20	20	"Another Final Exit" "The Box"	Ralph Senensky	Chester Krumholz and Teddi Sherman	February 10, 1968
21	21	"Eight to Five, It's a Miracle"	Harry Harvey, Jr.	Story by : Maureen Daly; Teleplay by : Dorothy Herald	February 17, 1968
22	22	"Delayed Action"	Michael O'Herlihy	Barry Oringer	March 2, 1968
23	23	"To Kill a Writer"	Charles Rondeau	Ben Gershman & David Braverman	March 9, 1968
24	24	"The Girl in the Frame"	Barry Crane	Wilton Schiller	March 16, 1968

=== Season 2 (1968–1969) ===
No. overall	No. in season	Title	Directed by	Written by	Original release date
25	1	"The Silent Cry"	Don Taylor	Arthur Weiss	September 28, 1968
26	2	"Comes Up Rose"	Gerald Mayer	Lee Loeb	October 5, 1968
27	3	"Pressure Point"	John Llewellyn Moxey	Warren Duff	October 12, 1968
28	4	"To the Swiftest, Death"	Sutton Roley	John Meredyth Lucas	October 19, 1968
29	5	"End of the Rainbow"	Robert L. Friend	Jackson Gillis	October 26, 1968
30	6	"A Copy of Murder"	Gerald Mayer	Brian McKay	November 2, 1968
31	7	"Edge of the Knife"	Stuart Hagmann	Stephen Kandel	November 9, 1968
32	8	"Who Will Dig the Graves?"	Allen Reisner	Daniel Mainwaring	November 16, 1968
33	9	"The Need of a Friend"	Sutton Roley	Chester Krumholz	November 23, 1968
34	10	"Night Out of Time"	John Llewellyn Moxey	Story by : Jerome Ross; Teleplay by : Jerome Ross and Warren Duff	December 7, 1968
35	11	"A View of Nowhere"	John Llewellyn Moxey	Story by : Stephen Kandel and Stanley Adams & George F. Slavin; Teleplay by : Stephen Kandel	December 14, 1968
36	12	"Fear I to Fall"	Allen Reisner	Samuel Newman	December 21, 1968
37	13	"Death Run"	Leslie H. Martinson and Gerald Mayer	Edward J. Lakso	January 4, 1969
38	14	"A Pittance of Faith"	Gerald Mayer	Blake Ritchie	January 11, 1969
39	15	"Only Giants Can Play"	Allen Reisner	Al C. Ward	January 18, 1969
40	16	"Shadow of a Man"	Sutton Roley	Stephen Kandel	January 25, 1969
41	17	"The Girl Who Came in with the Tide"	Gerald Mayer	Blake Ritchie and Don M. Mankiewicz	February 1, 1969
42	18	"Death in a Minor Key"	Stuart Hagmann	Ed Adamson	February 8, 1969
43	19	"End Game"	John Llewellyn Moxey	Cliff Gould	February 15, 1969
44	20	"All Around the Money Tree"	Murray Golden	Donn Mullally	February 22, 1969
45	21	"The Odds Against Donald Jordan"	Stuart Hagmann	Chester Krumholz	March 1, 1969
46	22	"Last Rites for Miss Emma"	Barry Crane	Albert Beich and William H. Wright	March 8, 1969
47	23	"The Solid Gold Web"	Sutton Roley	Blake Ritchie	March 22, 1969
48	24	"Merry Go Round for Murder"	Sutton Roley	John Meredyth Lucas and Arthur Dales	April 5, 1969
49	25	"To Catch a Rabbit"	Harry Harvey, Jr.	Shirl Hendryx and Shimon Wincelberg	April 12, 1969

=== Season 3 (1969–1970) ===
No. overall	No. in season	Title	Directed by	Written by	Original release date
50	1	"Eagles Sometimes Can't Fly"	Stuart Hagmann	Robert Heverly	September 27, 1969
51	2	"Color Her Missing"	Michael Caffey	Donn Mullally	October 4, 1969
52	3	"Return to Summer Grove"	Gerald Mayer	Cliff Gould	October 11, 1969
53	4	"The Playground"	Paul Krasny	Ed Adamson	October 18, 1969
54	5	"A Question of Midnight"	Sutton Roley	Barry Oringer	October 25, 1969
55	6	"A Penny for the Peep-Show"	Gerald Mayer	Stephen Kandel	November 1, 1969
56	7	"A Sleep in the Deep"	Gerald Mayer	John Meredyth Lucas	November 8, 1969
57	8	"Memory: Zero"	Harry Harvey, Jr.	Lionel E. Siegel and Ric Vollaerts	November 22, 1969
58	9	"The Nowhere Victim"	Sutton Roley	Dan Ullman	November 29, 1969
59	10	"The Sound of Darkness"	Corey Allen	Barry Trivers	December 6, 1969
60	11	"Who Killed Me?"	Harry Harvey, Jr.	Stephen Kandel	December 13, 1969
61	12	"Missing: Sun and Sky"	Sutton Roley	Cliff Gould and Norman Katkov & Halstead Welles	December 20, 1969
62	13	"Tooth of the Serpent"	Paul Krasny	Robert Lewin	December 27, 1969
63	14	"Medal for a Hero"	Seymour Robbie	Frank Telford	January 3, 1970
64	15	"Walk with a Dead Man"	Harvey Hart	Ed Adamson	January 10, 1970
65	16	"A Chance at the Roses"	Nick Webster	Lionel E. Siegel	January 17, 1970
66	17	"Blind Mirror"	Nick Webster	Don Brinkley	January 24, 1970
67	18	"Harlequin's Gold"	Gerald Mayer	Don Brinkley and Oliver Crawford	January 31, 1970
68	19	"Who Is Sylvia?"	Reza Badiyi	Alfred Brenner	February 7, 1970
69	20	"Only One Death to a Customer"	Michael O'Herlihy	John Meredyth Lucas	February 14, 1970
70	21	"Fly, Little One"	Murray Golden	Arthur Weiss	February 21, 1970
71	22	"The Search for Darrell Andrews"	Seymour Robbie	John Kneubuhl	February 28, 1970
72	23	"Murder Revisited"	Harvey Hart	Ed Adamson	March 7, 1970
73	24	"War of Nerves"	Rowe Wallerstein	Barry Trivers	March 14, 1970
74	25	"Once Upon a Saturday"	Barry Crane	Arline Anderson and Barry Crane	March 21, 1970

=== Season 4 (1970–1971) ===
No. overall	No. in season	Title	Directed by	Written by	Original release date
75	1	"A Ticket to the Eclipse"	John Llewellyn Moxey	Harold Medford	September 19, 1970
76	2	"One for the Lady"	John Llewellyn Moxey	Dan Ullman	September 26, 1970
77	3	"Time Out of Mind"	Corey Allen	Robert Pirosh	October 3, 1970
78	4	"Figures in a Landscape"	Paul Krasny	Donn Mullally	October 10, 1970
79	5	"The Mouse That Died"	Sutton Roley	Chester Krumholz	October 17, 1970
80	6	"The Lost Art of Dying"	Fernando Lamas	Ed Adamson	October 24, 1970
81	7	"The Other Game in Town"	Sutton Roley	Robert W. Lenski	October 31, 1970
82	8	"The World Between"	Paul Krasny	Ben Roberts and Lionel E. Siegel	November 7, 1970
83	9	"Sunburst"	John Llewellyn Moxey	Stephen Kandel	November 14, 1970
84	10	"To Cage a Sea Gull"	Paul Krasny	Ed Waters	November 21, 1970
85	11	"Bang, Bang, You're Dead"	Murray Golden	Warren Duff	November 28, 1970
86	12	"Deja Vu"	Seymour Robbie	Stephen Kandel	December 12, 1970
87	13	"Duet for Three"	John Llewellyn Moxey	Alfred Brenner	December 19, 1970
88	14	"Round Trip to Nowhere"	Gerald Mayer	John Meredyth Lucas	January 2, 1971
89	15	"What Happened to Sunday?"	Paul Krasny	Frank Telford	January 9, 1971
90	16	"The Judas Touch"	Gerald Mayer	Merwin Gerard	January 16, 1971
91	17	"With Intent to Kill"	Nick Webster	Ed Adamson	January 23, 1971
92	18	"The Crime That Wasn't"	Barry Crane	Dan Ullman	January 30, 1971
93	19	"A Gathering of Ghosts"	Reza Badiyi	John Meredyth Lucas	February 6, 1971
94	20	"A Day Filled with Shadows"	Paul Krasny	John D.F. Black and Cliff Gould	February 13, 1971
95	21	"Voice in the Dark"	Paul Krasny	Edward J. Lakso	February 20, 1971
96	22	"The Color of Murder"	Barry Crane	Harold Medford	February 27, 1971
97	23	"Shadow Play"	Paul Krasny	Stephen Kandel	March 6, 1971
98	24	"Overkill"	Harry Harvey, Jr.	Donn Mullally	March 13, 1971

=== Season 5 (1971–1972) ===
No. overall	No. in season	Title	Directed by	Written by	Original release date
99	1	"Dark So Early, Dark So Long"	John Llewellyn Moxey	Robert W. Lenski	September 15, 1971
100	2	"Cold Trail"	Barry Crane	Ed Waters	September 22, 1971
101	3	"A Step in Time"	Sutton Roley	Mann Rubin	September 29, 1971
102	4	"Wine from These Grapes"	Paul Krasny	David H. Vowell	October 6, 1971
103	5	"Woman in the Shadows"	Paul Krasny	Karl Tunberg	October 13, 1971
104	6	"Days Beyond Recall"	Jud Taylor	Robert Pirosh	October 20, 1971
105	7	"Run Till Dark"	Murray Golden	Dan Ullman	October 27, 1971
106	8	"The Glass Trap"	Reza S. Badiyi	Edward J. Lakso	November 3, 1971
107	9	"A Choice of Evils"	Paul Krasny	James Schmerer	November 10, 1971
108	10	"A Button for General D"	Reza S. Badiyi	Ernie Frankel	November 17, 1971
109	11	"The Man Outside"	Harry Harvey, Jr.	Story by : Tibor Zada; Teleplay by : Arthur Weiss	November 24, 1971
110	12	"Murder Times Three"	Leonard J. Horn	Stephen Kandel	December 1, 1971
111	13	"Catspaw"	Leonard J. Horn	Frank Telford	December 8, 1971
112	14	"To Save a Dead Man"	Paul Krasny	Donn Mullally	December 15, 1971
113	15	"Nightshade"	Reza Badiyi	Martin Roth	December 29, 1971
114	16	"Babe in the Woods"	Leonard J. Horn	Robert W. Lenski	January 5, 1972
115	17	"The Sound of Murder"	Leslie H. Martinson	Leigh Vance	January 12, 1972
116	18	"Moving Target"	Richard Benedict	Karl Tunberg	January 19, 1972
117	19	"Cry Pigeon"	Reza Badiyi	Donn Mullally	January 26, 1972
118	20	"A Walk in the Shadows"	Paul Krasny	Edward J. Lakso	February 9, 1972
119	21	"Lifeline"	Leslie H. Martinson	Dan Ullman	February 16, 1972
120	22	"To Draw the Lightning"	Don McDougall	Ed Adamson	February 23, 1972
121	23	"Scapegoat"	Leslie H. Martinson	Stephen Kandel	March 1, 1972
122	24	"Death is the Fifth Gear"	Paul Krasny	Chester Krumholz	March 8, 1972

=== Season 6 (1972–1973) ===
No. overall	No. in season	Title	Directed by	Written by	Original release date
123	1	"The Open Web"	Arnold Laven	Donn Mullally	September 17, 1972
124	2	"Cry Silence"	Alf Kjellin	Oliver Crawford and Ed Waters	September 24, 1972
125	3	"The Crimson Halo"	Leslie H. Martinson	Shimon Wincelberg	October 1, 1972
126	4	"Broken Mirror"	David Lowell Rich	Leigh Vance and Robert Pirosh	October 8, 1972
127	5	"Portrait of a Hero"	Arnold Laven	John Meredyth Lucas	October 15, 1972
128	6	"The Inside Man"	Paul Krasny	A.A. Ross	October 22, 1972
129	7	"To Kill a Memory"	Sutton Roley	Arthur Weiss	October 29, 1972
130	8	"The Upside Down Penny"	Arthur Marks	Robert W. Lenski	November 5, 1972
131	9	"One Step to Midnight"	Don McDougall	Warren Duff	November 12, 1972
132	10	"Harvest of Death"	Paul Krasny	Jerry Thomas	November 19, 1972
133	11	"A Puzzle for One"	Jeffrey Hayden	David P. Harmon	November 26, 1972
134	12	"Lost Sunday"	Reza Badiyi	Story by : Ellis Marcus; Teleplay by : Ellis Marcus and Alfred Hayes	December 3, 1972
135	13	"See No Evil"	Arnold Laven	Shimon Wincelberg	December 10, 1972
136	14	"Light and Shadow"	Sutton Roley	Richard Murphy and Harold Medford	December 17, 1972
137	15	"A Game of Shadows"	Gerald Mayer	Leigh Vance	December 24, 1972
138	16	"The Man Who Wasn't There"	Sutton Roley	Robert W. Lenski	January 7, 1973
139	17	"A Matter of Principle"	Alf Kjellin	Howard Browne	January 14, 1973
140	18	"Out of the Night"	Paul Krasny	William H. Wright	January 21, 1973
141	19	"Carol Lockwood, Past Tense"	Leslie H. Martinson	Harold Medford and Blake Ritchie	January 28, 1973
142	20	"The Faces of Murder"	Jeffrey Hayden	Robert W. Lenski and Stanley Roberts	February 4, 1973
143	21	"Search for a Whisper"	Arnold Laven	John Meredyth Lucas	February 18, 1973
144	22	"To Quote a Dead Man"	Michael O'Herlihy	Story by : Richard L. Breen, Jr. & James T. Surtees; Teleplay by : Robert W. Lenski	February 25, 1973
145	23	"A Problem of Innocence"	Don McDougall	Dan Ullman	March 4, 1973
146	24	"The Danford File"	Harry Harvey, Jr.	Mann Rubin	March 11, 1973

=== Season 7 (1973–1974) ===
No. overall	No. in season	Title	Directed by	Written by	Original release date
147	1	"The Girl in the Polka Dot Dress"	Alf Kjellin	Daniel B. Ullman and Ben Roberts	September 16, 1973
148	2	"A Way to Dusty Death"	Sutton Roley	Herb Meadow	September 23, 1973
149	3	"Climb a Deadly Mountain"	Arnold Laven	Richard L. Breen, Jr. and James T. Surtees	September 30, 1973
150	4	"Little Girl Lost"	Marvin J. Chomsky	Chester Krumholz	October 7, 1973
151	5	"The Gang's All Here"	Don McDougall	Albert Beich	October 14, 1973
152	6	"Desert Run"	Leslie H. Martinson	John Meredyth Lucas	October 21, 1973
153	7	"Silent Target"	Arnold Laven	Shimon Wincelberg and Ben Roberts	October 28, 1973
154	8	"A World Without Sundays"	Paul Krasny	Robert Pirosh	November 4, 1973
155	9	"Sing a Song of Murder"	Arnold Laven	Ben Roberts, Ivan Goff, and Stephen Kandel	November 11, 1973
156	10	"Search in the Dark"	Arnold Laven	Blake Ritchie	November 25, 1973
157	11	"The Deadly Madonna"	Paul Krasny	Mann Rubin	December 2, 1973
158	12	"Cry Danger"	Don McDougall	Robert W. Lenski	December 9, 1973
159	13	"All the Dead Were Strangers"	Leslie H. Martinson	Karl Tunberg	December 16, 1973
160	14	"Race Against Time: Part 1"	Paul Krasny	Harold Medford	January 6, 1974
161	15	"Race Against Time: Part 2"	Paul Krasny	Harold Medford	January 13, 1974
162	16	"The Dark Hours"	Paul Krasny	Donn Mullally	January 20, 1974
163	17	"A Night Full of Darkness"	John Llewellyn Moxey	Martin Roth	January 27, 1974
164	18	"Walk a Double Line"	Leslie H. Martinson	Ben Roberts, Ivan Goff, Ed Waters, & Lou Shaw	February 10, 1974
165	19	"The Girl from Nowhere"	Paul Krasny	Harold Livingston	February 17, 1974
166	20	"Rage to Kill"	Don McDougall	Bernard C. Schoenfeld	February 24, 1974
167	21	"Mask for a Charade"	Sutton Roley	Frank Telford	March 3, 1974
168	22	"A Question of Murder"	Don McDougall	Arthur Weiss and Jim Bateman	March 10, 1974
169	23	"Trap for a Pigeon"	Harry Harvey, Jr.	David P. Harmon	March 24, 1974
170	24	"The Ragged Edge"	Don McDougall	Daniel B. Ullman	March 31, 1974

=== Season 8 (1974–1975) ===
No. overall	No. in season	Title	Directed by	Written by	Original release date
171	1	"Portrait in Blues"	Alf Kjellin	Story by : Mel Torme; Teleplay by : James L. Henderson	September 22, 1974
172	2	"Game Plan"	Arnold Laven	Story by : Merwin Gerard; Teleplay by : Donn Mullally	September 29, 1974
173	3	"A Fine Day for Dying"	Leo Penn	Edward J. Lakso	October 6, 1974
174	4	"Walk on the Blind Side"	Paul Krasny	Albert Beich	October 13, 1974
175	5	"The Green Man"	Reza S. Badiyi	Richard Carlson	October 20, 1974
176	6	"Death Has No Face"	Don McDougall	Shimon Wincelberg	October 27, 1974
177	7	"A Small Favor for an Old Friend"	Paul Krasny	Harold Livingston	November 10, 1974
178	8	"Enter Tami Okada"	Paul Krasny	Robert Pirosh	November 17, 1974
179	9	"Picture of a Shadow"	Harry Harvey, Jr.	Donn Mullally	November 24, 1974
180	10	"Desert Sun"	Arnold Laven	David P. Harmon	December 1, 1974
181	11	"The Survivor Who Wasn't"	Michael O'Herlihy	Story by : Ben Roberts; Teleplay by : Harold Medford	December 15, 1974
182	12	"A Choice of Victims"	Harry Harvey, Jr.	John Meredyth Lucas	December 22, 1974
183	13	"A Word Called Courage"	Bill Bixby	George F. Slavin	January 5, 1975
184	14	"Man in a Trap"	Michael O'Herlihy	Bernard C. Schoenfeld	January 12, 1975
185	15	"Chance Meeting"	Don Weis	Frank Telford	January 19, 1975
186	16	"Edge of the Web"	John Peyser	Terence & Karl Tunberg	February 2, 1975
187	17	"A Ransom for Yesterday"	Bill Bixby	Mann Rubin	February 9, 1975
188	18	"The Empty Tower"	Bill Bixby	Robert Hamner	February 16, 1975
189	19	"Quartet for a Blunt Instrument"	Reza S. Badiyi	Shimon Wincelberg	February 23, 1975
190	20	"Bird of Prey"	Michael O'Herlihy	Alfred Hayes	March 2, 1975
191	21	"Bird of Prey"	Michael O'Herlihy	Based upon Venetian Bird by Victor Canning	March 9, 1975
192	22	"Design for Dying"	John Peyser	James L. Henderson	March 23, 1975
193	23	"Search for a Dead Man"	Paul Krasny	Dan Ullman	April 6, 1975
194	24	"Hardball"	Bill Bixby	Albert Beich	April 13, 1975
