= Shirley O'Hara =

American actress (1924–2002)

- Born: Shirley Har; August 15, 1924; Rochester, Minnesota, U.S.
- Died: December 13, 2002 (aged 78); Calabasas, California, U.S.
- Occupation: Actress
- Years active: 1943–1995
- Spouse(s): Jimmy McHugh Jr. (divorced); Milton Krims (m. 1959–1988; his death)
- Children: 1

Shirley O'Hara (born Shirley Har; August 15, 1924 – December 13, 2002) was an American actress. She appeared in numerous films from the 1940s to the 1980s.

== Biography ==
O'Hara was born in Rochester, Minnesota in 1924 and graduated from Rochester High School in 1942. As a high school senior, she worked at three film theaters in downtown Rochester.

After graduation, O'Hara moved to Hollywood. Her job as an elevator operator at Saks Fifth Avenue brought her in contact with people who worked with films, and she signed with RKO Studios when she was 18 years old. She began her acting career in 1943. Her film debut was in the Kay Kyser musical Around the World (1943). Other films in which she appeared included Tarzan and the Amazons, The Chase, Higher and Higher and Ghost Ship (1952).

O'Hara's figure led to her role in Ghost Ship, as the result of a process that was featured in the September 13, 1943, issue of Life. RKO held a competition to find the "shapeliest 'shadow girl'" for the role, because the leading lady in the film was seen only in silhouette.

During World War II, she received the Support for America award, acknowledging her wartime efforts with the Hollywood Canteen.

She also appeared in several TV series during the 1950s, including Fireside Theatre, Gunsmoke, The Millionaire, Racket Squad and Dragnet. In 1970, O'Hara appeared as Mrs. Drew on the TV western The Virginian in the episode "The Mysterious Mr. Tate."

During the early 1970s, she was appointed director of public relations for The Burbank Studios. In 1973, she played Mrs. Malone, a night school teacher, on the season four episode "Two Wrongs Don't Make a Writer" on The Mary Tyler Moore Show. She appeared on three episodes of The Bob Newhart Show as ditzy temporary secretary, Debbie Flett. She appeared in the films Duel (1971) and Rocky (1976). A member of the Publicists Guild, she retired in 1995.

== Personal life ==
O'Hara was married to Jimmy McHugh Jr., and they lived in England, where he headed the London branch of MCA Inc. They had one son, Jimmy McHugh III, but later divorced. Her second marriage was to Milton Krims.

== Death ==
On December 13, 2002, O'Hara died at the Motion Picture Hospital in Calabasas, California, from complications of diabetes at the age of 78.

== TV and filmography ==
- Gildersleeve on Broadway (1943) – Model (uncredited)
- Government Girl (1943) – Girl in Hotel Lobby (uncredited)
- Around the World (1943) – Shirley (uncredited)
- Higher and Higher (1943) – Bridesmaid (uncredited)
- The Ghost Ship (1943) – Ellen's Sister (uncredited)
- The Falcon Out West (1944) – Hat Check Girl (uncredited)
- Seven Days Ashore (1944) – Girl in Band (uncredited)
- Show Business (1944) – Chorine (uncredited)
- Step Lively (1944) – Louise, 'Daughter' in Rehearsal (uncredited)
- Three Is a Family (1944) – Janet (uncredited)
- Tarzan and the Amazons (1945) – Athena
- Cuban Pete (1946) – Girl (uncredited)
- The Runaround (1946) – Stewardess (uncredited)
- Lover Come Back (1946) – Show Girl (uncredited)
- The Chase (1946) – Manicurist
- Love Laughs at Andy Hardy (1946) – College Coed (uncredited)
- Bells of San Fernando (1947) – Nita
- Ghost Ship (1952)
- Mr. and Mrs. North (1953) – Phyllis Tucker
- Fireside Theatre (1953) (2 episodes)
  - Season 5 Episode 17: "The Lady Wears a Star" – Lucinda
  - Season 5 Episode 24: "A Grand Cop" – Mary Casey
- Crime Wave (1953) – Girl with Bandaged Man (uncredited)
- Schlitz Playhouse of Stars (1953)
  - Season 3 Episode 12: "Fresh Start" – Landlady
- December Bride (1954)
  - Season 1 Episode 3: "The Chinese Dinner"
- The Star and the Story (1955)
  - Season 1 Episode 12: "First Offense" – Mrs. Canelli
- Highway Patrol (1956)
  - Season 1 Episode 30: "Hitchhiker Dies" – Payroll Clerk
- Sneak Preview (1956)
  - Season 1 Episode 3: "One Minute from Broadway"
- The Detectives (1960)
  - Season 1 Episode 13: "Karate" – Mrs. Stalker
- Have Gun - Will Travel (1959-1961) (5 episodes)
  - S2:E24, "The Monster of Moon Ridge" (1959) - Maria
  - S2:E34, "Comanche" (1959) - Mrs. Carver
  - S4:E19, "The Princess and the Gunfighter" (1961) - Duchess de Bernal
  - S4:E37, "The Uneasy Grave" (1961) - Lady at Johnsonville Hotel
  - S5:E5, "A Proof of Love" (1961) - Mrs. Grey
- The 3rd Voice (1960) – Carreras' Secretary
- Sea Hunt (1960)
  - Season 3 Episode 19: "Cross Current" – Fran Parmalee
- The High Powered Rifle (1960) – Jean Brewster
- Stagecoach West (1960)
  - Season 1 Episode 3: "The Dark Return" – Mrs. Jessup
- Rawhide (1960)
  - S3:E6, "Incident on the Road to Yesterday" – Mrs. Slocum
- Lock-Up (1960)
  - Season 2 Episode 13: "Concrete Coffin" – Harriet Janis
- Gunsmoke (1960-1963) (3 episodes)
  - (S5:E28, "Crowbait Bob") (1960) – Martha Guilbert
  - (S6:E29, "Stolen Horses") (1961) – Mrs. Kurtch
  - (S9:E7, "Quint's Trail") (1963) – Florie Neff
- Schwarzer Kies aka Black Gravel (1961)
- The Little Shepherd of Kingdom Come (1961) – Mrs. Turner
- Love in a Goldfish Bowl (1961) – Clara Dumont
- Bus Stop (1961)
  - Season 1 Episode 1: "Afternoon of a Cowboy" – Mattie
- Alfred Hitchcock Presents (1961-1962)
  - (S6:E29, "The Pearl Necklace") (1961) – Nurse
  - (S7:E13, "The Silk Petticoat") (1962) – Flora
- The Twilight Zone (1961-1963, TV Series) (2 episodes)
  - (Season 2 Episode 24: "The Rip Van Winkle Caper") (1961) – George's Wife
  - (Season 4 Episode 16: "On Thursday We Leave for Home") – Colonist
- The Untouchables (1962)
  - S3:E23, "The Case Against Eliot Ness" – Mrs. Halvorsen
- Stoney Burke (1962) (S1:E7, "Sidewinder") – Nurse
- The Eleventh Hour (1962-1963, TV Series) (3 episodes)
  - (Season 1 Episode 9: "Cry a Little for Mary Too") (1962) – Mrs. Stanger
  - (Season 1 Episode 20: "Beauty Playing a Mandolin Underneath a Willow Tree") (1963) – Nurse
  - (Season 1 Episode 23: "The Wings of the Morning") (1963) – Miss Pendleton
- The Alfred Hitchcock Hour (1963) (Season 1 Episode 32: "Death of a Cop") – Alice Reardon
- Sam Benedict (1963)
  - S1:E26, "Read No Evil") – Helen Eddy
- The Outer Limits (1963-1964) (2 episodes)
  - (S1:E8, "The Human Factor") (1963) – Dr. Soldini
  - (S2:E4, "Expanding Human") (1964) – Receptionist
- The Virginian (1964-1970) (2 episodes)
  - (S3:E15, "A Man of the People") (1964) – Mrs. Dolan
  - (S9:E5, "The Mysterious Mr. Tate") (1970 – Mrs. Drew
- Sylvia (1965) – Mrs. Karoki
- Perry Mason (1965) (Season 9 Episode 1: "The Case of the Laughing Lady") – Superintendent
- The Fugitive (1966)
  - S3:E21, "Shadow of the Swan" – Landlady
- The Hostage (1967) – Mrs. Primus
- Mannix (1969-1975) (8 episodes)
  - S2:E23, "The Solid Gold Web" (1969) – Iris Meachim
  - S3:E1, "Eagles Sometimes Can't Fly" (1970) – Store Owner's Wife
  - S3:E21, "Fly, Little One" (1970) – Mrs. Carr
  - S4:E22, "The Color of Murder" (1971) – Martha
  - S5:E6, "Days Beyond Recall" (1971) – Mission Worker
  - S6:E17, "A Matter of Principle" (1973) – Mrs. Zeigler
  - S7:E20, "A Rage to Kill" (1974) – Housekeeper
  - S8:E17, "A Ransom for Yesterday" (1975) – Servant
- Room 222 (1970) (2 episodes)
  - (Season 1 Episode 18: "Play It Loose") – Teacher
  - S2:E5, "Choose One and They Lived Happily/Unhappily Ever After" – Miss Foss
- The Young Lawyers (1970)
  - Season 1 Episode 10: "Are You Running with Me, Jimmy") – Dr. Louise Cantrell
- Duel (1971) – Waitress
- Emergency! (1973)
  - Season 3 Episode 3: "Alley Cat" – Ellie
- Mary Tyler Moore (1974)
  - Season 4 Episode 23: "Two Wrongs Don't Make a Writer" – Night School Teacher
- The Streets of San Francisco (1976)
  - Season 4 Episode 18: "Underground" – Mrs. Evans
- Rocky (1976) – Secretary
- Rhoda (1977)
  - S3:E22, "The Second Time Around" – Marge
- Flight to Holocaust (1977) (TV movie) – Mrs. Benter
- Quincy, M.E. (1978)
  - Season 3 Episode 13: "Crib Job" – Mrs. Barnett
- The Incredible Hulk (1978)
  - Season 1 Episode 7: "747" – Mrs. MacIntire
- Crash (1978) (TV movie)
- Lucan (1978)
  - Season 1 Episode 9: "Brother Wolf" – Sally
- Getting Wasted (1980) – Mrs. Kramer (final film role)
