= Mannix season 7 =

Mannix
- Season 7
- No. of episodes: 24

Release
- Original network: CBS
- Original release: September 16, 1973 – March 31, 1974

Season chronology
- ← Previous; Season 6 Next → Season 8

This is a list of episodes from the seventh season of Mannix.

== Broadcast history ==
The season originally aired Sundays at 8:30-9:30 pm (EST).

== Home media ==
The season was released on DVD by Paramount Home Video.

== Episodes ==
| No. overall | No. in season | Title | Directed by | Written by | Original release date |
|---|---|---|---|---|---|
| 147 | 1 | "The Girl in the Polka Dot Dress" | Alf Kjellin | Daniel B. Ullman and Ben Roberts | September 16, 1973 |
Mannix is astonished that a clairvoyant's tale of a woman in danger has come true.
| 148 | 2 | "A Way to Dusty Death" | Sutton Roley | Herb Meadow | September 23, 1973 |
Mannix hunts down a convicted rapist-murderer who vanished after being acquitted on a technicality. Anthony Geary guest stars.
| 149 | 3 | "Climb a Deadly Mountain" | Arnold Laven | Richard L. Breen, Jr. and James T. Surtees | September 30, 1973 |
Mannix is pulled out of a crashed plane by an escaped convict (Greg Morris) being hunted by guards bent on killing him.
| 150 | 4 | "Little Girl Lost" | Marvin J. Chomsky | Chester Krumholz | October 7, 1973 |
Mannix probes a journalist's murder. Note: The Diagnosis: Murder episode 4/17 "Hard-Boiled Murder" {Feb 13, 1997} serves as a sequel to this episode.
| 151 | 5 | "The Gang's All Here" | Don McDougall | Albert Beich | October 14, 1973 |
Gang members decide to kill Mannix in order to bolster their reputation.
| 152 | 6 | "Desert Run" | Leslie H. Martinson | John Meredyth Lucas | October 21, 1973 |
Mannix is faced with hostility as he searches for a plane-crash victim near a small town.
| 153 | 7 | "Silent Target" | Arnold Laven | Shimon Wincelberg and Ben Roberts | October 28, 1973 |
Mannix runs into a gang of hit men waiting for their next assignments. Guest stars Frank Langella, BarBara Luna, John Hillerman
| 154 | 8 | "A World Without Sundays" | Paul Krasny | Robert Pirosh | November 4, 1973 |
A mobster's missing girlfriend reappears to find her roommate murdered.
| 155 | 9 | "Sing a Song of Murder" | Arnold Laven | Ben Roberts, Ivan Goff, and Stephen Kandel | November 11, 1973 |
Someone is trying to kill an opera singer (Nancy Kovack) coming out of retirement.
| 156 | 10 | "Search in the Dark" | Arnold Laven | Blake Ritchie | November 25, 1973 |
A blind cutthroat does everything he can to have a missing jewel collection he'd been seeking for five years.
| 157 | 11 | "The Deadly Madonna" | Paul Krasny | Mann Rubin | December 2, 1973 |
An actress claims a grotesquely masked man attempted to murder her, putting her sanity on a block.
| 158 | 12 | "Cry Danger" | Don McDougall | Robert W. Lenski | December 9, 1973 |
Mannix gets beaten up after meeting an old girlfriend who winds up dead.
| 159 | 13 | "All the Dead Were Strangers" | Leslie H. Martinson | Karl Tunberg | December 16, 1973 |
The six survivors of a plane crash are targeted for murder.
| 160 | 14 | "Race Against Time: Part 1" | Paul Krasny | Harold Medford | January 6, 1974 |
Mannix attempts to save ailing freedom fighter Victor Lucas (Cesare Danova) in a despotically ruled country. Dr. Myles Considine (John Colicos) is recruited to perform the surgery.
| 161 | 15 | "Race Against Time: Part 2" | Paul Krasny | Harold Medford | January 13, 1974 |
Mannix and Dr. Considine race against time to retrieve a pacemaker. A saboteur tries to thwart their plans
| 162 | 16 | "The Dark Hours" | Paul Krasny | Donn Mullally | January 20, 1974 |
Mannix attempts to remember the circumstances that led to him being shot by his own gun.
| 163 | 17 | "A Night Full of Darkness" | John Llewellyn Moxey | Martin Roth | January 27, 1974 |
Lieutenant Malcolm (Ward Wood) seeks revenge for his new bride's murder.
| 164 | 18 | "Walk a Double Line" | Leslie H. Martinson | Ben Roberts, Ivan Goff, Ed Waters, & Lou Shaw | February 10, 1974 |
Witnesses believe Mannix's latest client (John Bennett Perry) committed a murder. Val Avery, Davey Davison and Marie Windsor guest star.
| 165 | 19 | "The Girl from Nowhere" | Paul Krasny | Harold Livingston | February 17, 1974 |
Mannix puts his life at risk as he protects a woman (Rosemary Forsyth) from her violent lover.
| 166 | 20 | "Rage to Kill" | Don McDougall | Bernard C. Schoenfeld | February 24, 1974 |
A psychistrist mysteriously dies after publishing the case histories of three psychotic killers without mentioning their names. Ramon Bieri, Biff Elliot, Katherine Helmond, and Bill McKinney guest star.
| 167 | 21 | "Mask for a Charade" | Sutton Roley | Frank Telford | March 3, 1974 |
A policeman (Claude Akins) is accused of killing a loan shark. Jeanne Bates, Marj Dusay, and Dennis Patrick guest star.
| 168 | 22 | "A Question of Murder" | Don McDougall | Arthur Weiss and Jim Bateman | March 10, 1974 |
With his last breath, an aging professional boxer blames a younger opponent for his death.
| 169 | 23 | "Trap for a Pigeon" | Harry Harvey, Jr. | David P. Harmon | March 24, 1974 |
A lawyer's stolen briefcase contains a fortune that's about to be used as a bribe in a syndicate murder case.
| 170 | 24 | "The Ragged Edge" | Don McDougall | Daniel B. Ullman | March 31, 1974 |
Mannix poses as a heroin addict who promises to murder an old friend for a fix.
