= Mannix season 5 =

Mannix
- Season 5
- No. of episodes: 24

Release
- Original network: CBS
- Original release: September 15, 1971 – March 8, 1972

Season chronology
- ← Previous; Season 4 Next → Season 6

This is a list of episodes from the fifth season of Mannix.

== Broadcast history ==
The season originally aired Wednesdays at 10:00-11:00 pm (EST).

== Home media ==
The season was released on DVD by Paramount Home Video.

== Episodes ==
No. overall	No. in season	Title	Directed by	Written by	Original release date
99	1	"Dark So Early, Dark So Long"	John Llewellyn Moxey	Robert W. Lenski	September 15, 1971
Mannix's latest case involves blackmail and murder. (Rosemary Forsyth, Guy Stockwell)
100	2	"Cold Trail"	Barry Crane	Ed Waters	September 22, 1971
A young woman is on the run from a gang of killers with an unknown motive.
101	3	"A Step in Time"	Sutton Roley	Mann Rubin	September 29, 1971
Mannix can't find the lady who he saw being attacked in her yard by 2 men, but he does find out that a woman was murdered there under the same scenario a year before.
102	4	"Wine from These Grapes"	Paul Krasny	David H. Vowell	October 6, 1971
Mannix investigates a murder in a California grape-growing region. (Victor Jory as Stefan Mannix)
103	5	"Woman in the Shadows"	Paul Krasny	Karl Tunberg	October 13, 1971
A mysterious woman gets Mannix involved in the hunt for the first chapter of Karl Marx's Das Kapital.
104	6	"Days Beyond Recall"	Jud Taylor	Robert Pirosh	October 20, 1971
Mannix searches skid row for a former crime exposé writer who supposedly drowned. (Vic Morrow, Elizabeth Allen)
105	7	"Run Till Dark"	Murray Golden	Dan Ullman	October 27, 1971
Mannix finds himself in a dirty syndicate game involving a youngsters' baseball coach gone missing.
106	8	"The Glass Trap"	Reza S. Badiyi	Edward J. Lakso	November 3, 1971
A New York policeman is troubled over extraditing a suspected cop killer.
107	9	"A Choice of Evils"	Paul Krasny	James Schmerer	November 10, 1971
A racketeer makes Mannix his reluctant employee.
108	10	"A Button for General D"	Reza S. Badiyi	Ernie Frankel	November 17, 1971
A dying man's words start a treasure hunt.
109	11	"The Man Outside"	Harry Harvey, Jr.	Story by : Tibor Zada; Teleplay by : Arthur Weiss	November 24, 1971
A retired Army general (Andrew Duggan) is victimized by a blackmailer.
110	12	"Murder Times Three"	Leonard J. Horn	Stephen Kandel	December 1, 1971
Mannix wonders why he's been fired from separate cases at once.
111	13	"Catspaw"	Leonard J. Horn	Frank Telford	December 8, 1971
A case of extortion places Mannix on the search for a missing letter.
112	14	"To Save a Dead Man"	Paul Krasny	Donn Mullally	December 15, 1971
A dying man pleads with Mannix to save a convicted murderer who admits his guilt.
113	15	"Nightshade"	Reza Badiyi	Martin Roth	December 29, 1971
A comedian is connected to a private eye's murder. Milton Berle guest stars.
114	16	"Babe in the Woods"	Leonard J. Horn	Robert W. Lenski	January 5, 1972
Mannix puts himself at risk when he looks for a murder victim's plans hidden on a golf course. Nita Talbot and Paul Stevens guest star.
115	17	"The Sound of Murder"	Leslie H. Martinson	Leigh Vance	January 12, 1972
A tape recording connects a missing philanderer to a beautiful model, blackmail and murder.
116	18	"Moving Target"	Richard Benedict	Karl Tunberg	January 19, 1972
A silent partner seems anxious to silence his partner. Art Buchwald has a cameo role.
117	19	"Cry Pigeon"	Reza Badiyi	Donn Mullally	January 26, 1972
The patriarch of a racketeer family comes to Mannix for help in a possible gang war.
118	20	"A Walk in the Shadows"	Paul Krasny	Edward J. Lakso	February 9, 1972
Mannix deals with jealousy and blackmail as he works to clear a man accused of murdering his wife.
119	21	"Lifeline"	Leslie H. Martinson	Dan Ullman	February 16, 1972
A singer becomes a target for murder after his involvement with a dope pusher's killing. Lou Rawls guest stars.
120	22	"To Draw the Lightning"	Don McDougall	Ed Adamson	February 23, 1972
A cop is accused of murder, but is strangely uncooperative in helping Mannix prove it was a set-up.
121	23	"Scapegoat"	Leslie H. Martinson	Stephen Kandel	March 1, 1972
With Mannix stranded in the desert, his lookalike Mannix (imposter) (Dick Ziker) (also played by Mike Connors in a dual role) makes off with eight million dollars' worth of jewels.
122	24	"Death is the Fifth Gear"	Paul Krasny	Chester Krumholz	March 8, 1972
A somewhat dotty patient has Mannix deal with a case that engulfs him with paranoia and hallucinations.
