= Mannix season 4 =

Mannix
- Season 4
- No. of episodes: 24

Release
- Original network: CBS
- Original release: September 19, 1970 – March 13, 1971

Season chronology
- ← Previous; Season 3 Next → Season 5

This is a list of episodes from the fourth season of Mannix.

== Broadcast history ==
The season originally aired Saturdays at 10:00-11:00 pm (EST).

== Home media ==
The season was released on DVD by Paramount Home Video.

== Episodes ==
No. overall	No. in season	Title	Directed by	Written by	Original release date
75	1	"A Ticket to the Eclipse"	John Llewellyn Moxey	Harold Medford	September 19, 1970
Mannix matches wits with a systematic psychotic killer. Guest stars: Darren McGavin, Dane Clark
76	2	"One for the Lady"	John Llewellyn Moxey	Dan Ullman	September 26, 1970
A gangster's widow has a suspicious job offer for Mannix. Guest stars: James B. Sikking, Robert Reed, Jo Van Fleet, Jack Carter; also featuring redressed set of The Brady Bunch house seen earlier in the series.
77	3	"Time Out of Mind"	Corey Allen	Robert Pirosh	October 3, 1970
A former boxing champ is accused of killing a fight fixer.
78	4	"Figures in a Landscape"	Paul Krasny	Donn Mullally	October 10, 1970
Mannix is threatened over the phone and pursued by a mysterious fellow in his search for a missing woman. Victor French and Loretta Swit guest star.
79	5	"The Mouse That Died"	Sutton Roley	Chester Krumholz	October 17, 1970
Mannix's latest case involves slow-acting poison and an anagram. Robert Ito as Dr. Yoshiro
80	6	"The Lost Art of Dying"	Fernando Lamas	Ed Adamson	October 24, 1970
Mannix probes the case of a death-row inmate who will be executed in 72 hours.
81	7	"The Other Game in Town"	Sutton Roley	Robert W. Lenski	October 31, 1970
While searching for a debt-ridden gambler, Mannix suspects an insurance fraud scam has been committed.
82	8	"The World Between"	Paul Krasny	Ben Roberts and Lionel E. Siegel	November 7, 1970
An African Premier, who happens to be Peggy's latest love, has been targeted for assassination.
83	9	"Sunburst"	John Llewellyn Moxey	Stephen Kandel	November 14, 1970
Mannix seeks the culprit who held him prisoner in a lonely desert cafe.
84	10	"To Cage a Sea Gull"	Paul Krasny	Ed Waters	November 21, 1970
Mannix finds two strange clues in a case involving a fatal helicopter crash.
85	11	"Bang, Bang, You're Dead"	Murray Golden	Warren Duff	November 28, 1970
A hit-and-run attempt on a little girl convinces Mannix that she escaped from killers planning another murder.
86	12	"Deja Vu"	Seymour Robbie	Stephen Kandel	December 12, 1970
A young woman claims to be having prophetic dreams. Kim Hunter and Brenda Scott appear as mother and daughter.
87	13	"Duet for Three"	John Llewellyn Moxey	Alfred Brenner	December 19, 1970
Mannix probes a case involving the widow of a suicide victim and a Vietnamese man who's following her.
88	14	"Round Trip to Nowhere"	Gerald Mayer	John Meredyth Lucas	January 2, 1971
Mannix gets wrapped up in a puzzling murder mystery.
89	15	"What Happened to Sunday?"	Paul Krasny	Frank Telford	January 9, 1971
Mannix is driven by a haunting memory to find out how he was injured in the last 24 hours.
90	16	"The Judas Touch"	Gerald Mayer	Merwin Gerard	January 16, 1971
A police officer is suspected of robbery and murder.
91	17	"With Intent to Kill"	Nick Webster	Ed Adamson	January 23, 1971
A detective ignores death threats to investigate a robbery.
92	18	"The Crime That Wasn't"	Barry Crane	Dan Ullman	January 30, 1971
A missing corpse is the key to figuring out who put a syndicate contract on Mannix. Jacqueline Susann as Clare Bowman, Charles Bateman as George Bowman
93	19	"A Gathering of Ghosts"	Reza Badiyi	John Meredyth Lucas	February 6, 1971
The reunion of Mannix's college football team turns sinister.
94	20	"A Day Filled with Shadows"	Paul Krasny	John D.F. Black and Cliff Gould	February 13, 1971
Mannix races mob enforcers to find a millionaire's son whose disappearance is connected to a gangland murder.
95	21	"Voice in the Dark"	Paul Krasny	Edward J. Lakso	February 20, 1971
A disabled diving champion (Carol Lynley) says she's been getting death threats.
96	22	"The Color of Murder"	Barry Crane	Harold Medford	February 27, 1971
Mannix investigates the case of a man who was killed before he could expose a syndicate operation. Diane Keaton as Cindy Conrad.
97	23	"Shadow Play"	Paul Krasny	Stephen Kandel	March 6, 1971
A prominent businessman is suspected of murdering his wife.
98	24	"Overkill"	Harry Harvey, Jr.	Donn Mullally	March 13, 1971
Mannix encounters complicated twists in his search for the psychotic who may have killed the detective's friend.
