= Mannix season 8 =

Mannix
- Season 8
- No. of episodes: 24

Release
- Original network: CBS
- Original release: September 22, 1974 – April 13, 1975

Season chronology
- ← Previous; Season 7

This is a list of episodes from the eighth season of Mannix.

== Broadcast history ==
The season originally aired Sundays at 9:30–10:30 pm (EST).

== Home media ==
The season was released on DVD by Paramount Home Video.

== Episodes ==
No. overall	No. in season	Title	Directed by	Written by	Original release date
172	1	"Portrait in Blues"	Alf Kjellin	James L. Henderson	September 22, 1974
A singer is nearly electrocuted during a performance. Mannix is hired to find out if it was just an accident or if someone is out to get him.
173	2	"Game Plan"	Arnold Laven	Donn Mullally	September 29, 1974
Mannix comes to Albuquerque to help his goddaughter.
174	3	"A Fine Day for Dying"	Leo Penn	Edward J. Lakso	October 6, 1974
A woman awakens from a year long coma only to discover that someone wants to kill her. The reason why is a complete mystery and Mannix takes her case, which puts him in the middle of two feuding organized crime families.
175	4	"Walk on the Blind Side"	Paul Krasny	Albert Beich	October 13, 1974
The search is on and it's up to Mannix to uncover every possible stone, when Peggy's apprehended by syndicate thugs, who have mistaken her for an informant they are seeking.
176	5	"The Green Man"	Reza Badiyi	Richard Carlson	October 20, 1974
Mannix, Federal Agents (and violent associates), race to find a missing counterfeiter, who took off with the printing plates for creating the illegal currency.
177	6	"Death Has No Face"	Don McDougall	Shimon Wincelberg	October 27, 1974
Mannix investigates anonymous death threats against him that turn serious when someone takes a shot at him.
178	7	"A Small Favor for an Old Friend"	Paul Krasny	Harold Livingston	November 10, 1974
While investigating the death of an old friend from the Korean War, Mannix discovers that someone claiming to be him has been living in San Francisco for the last three weeks while Mannix was on a fishing trip.
179	8	"Enter Tami Okada"	Paul Krasny	Robert Pirosh	November 17, 1974
A Japanese PI comes to Mannix looking for help tracking down a missing Japanese courier.
180	9	"Picture of a Shadow"	Harry Harvey Jr.	Donn Mullally	November 24, 1974
Mannix is hired to look into the death of one photographer and gets romantically involved with another.
181	10	"Desert Sun"	Arnold Laven	David P. Harmon	December 1, 1974
Mannix looks into an Indian's death in a small New Mexico town ruled by fear, intimidation, and prejudice.
182	11	"The Survivor Who Wasn't"	Michael O'Herlihy	Ben Roberts; Harold Medford	December 15, 1974
The survivor of a plane crash undergoes plastic surgery, and his wife hires Mannix to find out if he's really her husband.
183	12	"A Choice of Victims"	Harry Harvey Jr.	John Meredyth Lucas	December 22, 1974
A wife hires Mannix to discover who killed her husband during a charity show rehearsal... when she may have been the target. Rona Barrett appears as herself.
184	13	"A Word Called Courage"	Bill Bixby	George F. Slavin	January 5, 1975
A former soldier who broke under torture and who Mannix helped court-martial set out to get revenge on the PI by putting him through the same ordeal.
185	14	"Man in a Trap"	Michael O'Herlihy	Bernard C. Schoenfeld	January 12, 1975
An older PI is shot while working a case, and the man's wife asks Mannix to find the shooter.
186	15	"Chance Meeting"	Don Weis	Frank Telford	January 19, 1975
An Army deserter kills Peggy's cousin's husband, and Mannix tracks down the man responsible.
187	16	"Edge of the Web"	John Peyser	Karl Tunberg; Terence Tunberg	February 2, 1975
A former student is accused of killing his former professor, and hires Mannix to find the real killer.
188	17	"A Ransom for Yesterday"	Bill Bixby	Mann Rubin	February 9, 1975
A kidnapper demands a ransom from his victim's mother... six years after the boy was kidnapped.
189	18	"The Empty Tower"	Bill Bixby	Robert Hamner	February 16, 1975
Mannix and a friend are locked in an office building by three thieves looting the place. Director Bixby also guest stars.
190	19	"Quartet for Blunt Instrument"	Reza Badiyi	Shimon Wincelberg	February 23, 1975
A hitchhiker Mannix picks up is accused of murder, and the PI tries to clear the man's name.
191	20	"Bird of Prey: Part 1"	Michael O'Herlihy	Alfred Hayes	March 2, 1975
Mannix travels to a tropical island country to take a case to find a man, but is soon embroiled in a plot to kill the country's president. Based upon the novel Venetian Bird written by Victor Canning.
192	21	"Bird of Prey: Part 2"	Michael O'Herlihy	Alfred Hayes	March 9, 1975
Mannix goes on the run after he's framed for the murder of a country's president. Based upon the novel Venetian Bird written by Victor Canning.
193	22	"Design for Dying"	John Peyser	James L. Henderson	March 23, 1975
A newspaper publisher hires Mannix to acquire evidence that his wife Rebekah is having an affair and convince her to break it off. But after Mannix does so, he suspects that the entire thing was a set-up.
194	23	"Search for a Dead Man"	Paul Krasny	Dan Ullman	April 6, 1975
A hit man kills a mob boss but the body disappears, so the killer hires Mannix to find the dead man.
195	24	"Hardball"	Bill Bixby	Albert Beich	April 13, 1975
Mannix and the police bust up a drug ring, but a dealer escapes and takes six people hostage to force the authorities to hand over the man who betrayed them to the cops.
