= Mannix season 2 =

Mannix
- Season 2
- No. of episodes: 25

Release
- Original network: CBS
- Original release: September 28, 1968 – April 12, 1969

Season chronology
- ← Previous; Season 1 Next → Season 3

This is a list of episodes from the second season of Mannix.

== Broadcast history ==
The season originally aired Saturdays at 10:00-11:00 pm (EST).

== Home media ==
The season was released on DVD by Paramount Home Video.

== Episodes ==
No. overall	No. in season	Title	Directed by	Written by	Original release date
25	1	"The Silent Cry"	Don Taylor	Arthur Weiss	September 28, 1968
Mannix goes after a professional hitman who is targeting a deaf woman who is able to identify him. Jason Evers, Laurence Naismith, and Audree Norton guest star. NOTES: First appearance of Gail Fisher as Peggy Fair. Mannix comments on his resignation from Intertect.
26	2	"Comes Up Rose"	Gerald Mayer	Lee Loeb	October 5, 1968
Mannix faces a conspiracy of silence to rescue a woman named Rose Anderson (Sheree North) from the underworld. Ronald Long and Gerald S. O'Loughlin guest star.
27	3	"Pressure Point"	John Llewellyn Moxey	Warren Duff	October 12, 1968
The few words of a badly beaten man (Stewart Moss) help Mannix expose corruption in the court. Paul Stewart and Harold J. Stone guest star. NOTES: Peggy drops in at Intertect, and wrangles some computer time out of Parker. Wickersham is mentioned, but not seen.
28	4	"To the Swiftest, Death"	Sutton Roley	John Meredyth Lucas	October 19, 1968
Mannix investigates a race-car accident that killed an aerospace engineer. Hugh Beaumont, Nicholas Colasanto, and Jill Ireland guest star.
29	5	"End of the Rainbow"	Robert L. Friend	Jackson Gillis	October 26, 1968
Mannix investigates the death of a born loser who was hit by a car. Kathryn Hays and George Savalas guest star.
30	6	"A Copy of Murder"	Gerald Mayer	Brian McKay	November 2, 1968
Mannix finds clues to a murder while searching for a chapter of the dead man's manuscript. Kevin Hagen, Clifton James, and Barbara Rush guest star.
31	7	"Edge of the Knife"	Stuart Hagmann	Stephen Kandel	November 9, 1968
Kidnappers are threatening to kill a surgeon's son unless the surgeon (Fritz Weaver) lets a patient die. Geraldine Brooks, Anna Lee, and Ford Rainey guest star.
32	8	"Who Will Dig the Graves?"	Allen Reisner	Daniel Mainwaring	November 16, 1968
Mannix uncovers startling denouements in his search for a millionaire's wife (Linda Marsh). Barry Atwater, George Gaynes, and Harry Dean Stanton guest star.
33	9	"The Need of a Friend"	Sutton Roley	Chester Krumholz	November 23, 1968
Mannix tries to clear a parolee (John Colicos) who intends to avenge the conspiracy plotted against him - and find a million dollars in lost loot. Barbara Babcock, Richard Bull, and Cloris Leachman guest star.
34	10	"Night Out of Time"	John Llewellyn Moxey	Story by : Jerome Ross; Teleplay by : Jerome Ross and Warren Duff	December 7, 1968
Mannix reconstructs the previous night for a young man who may have killed a girl. David Brian guest stars.
35	11	"A View of Nowhere"	John Llewellyn Moxey	Story by : Stephen Kandel and Stanley Adams & George F. Slavin; Teleplay by : Stephen Kandel	December 14, 1968
Mannix is faced with conflicting facts while investigating a murder he saw occur on a penthouse terrace. Hazel Court, Larry Linville, Michael Wilding, and Katherine Woodville guest star.
36	12	"Fear I to Fall"	Allen Reisner	Samuel Newman	December 21, 1968
Mannix helps a lawyer defend a murder suspect they both believe is innocent. Richard Anderson, Joanna Barnes, and Dana Elcar guest star.
37	13	"Death Run"	Leslie H. Martinson and Gerald Mayer	Edward J. Lakso	January 4, 1969
A friend's (Fred Beir) begging for help leads Mannix to a forestry station where he's menaced by a sheriff (John Milford) and meets two women (Beverlee McKinsey and Madlyn Rhue) claiming to be the friend's wife.
38	14	"A Pittance of Faith"	Gerald Mayer	Blake Ritchie	January 11, 1969
Mannix is hired to prove that a woman named Gina Lardelli (Corinne Camacho) did not kill herself. Larry Linville, Joe Mantell, Woodrow Parfrey, David Opatoshu and Bobby Troup guest stars.
39	15	"Only Giants Can Play"	Allen Reisner	Al C. Ward	January 18, 1969
Mannix's murder investigation leads him into the political arena where a gubernatorial hopeful, (John Dehner) fights to be nominated.
40	16	"Shadow of a Man"	Sutton Roley	Stephen Kandel	January 25, 1969
Mannix attempts to assist a fellow Korean War veteran who is subsequently murdered. The man's military and personal histories are investigated to help solve the crime. Antoinette Bower, Don Chastain, Larry Linville, and William Windom guest star.
41	17	"The Girl Who Came in with the Tide"	Gerald Mayer	Blake Ritchie and Don M. Mankiewicz	February 1, 1969
Despite evidence to the contrary, Mannix believes a drowning victim was murdered. Lloyd Bochner and Robert Reed guest star
42	18	"Death in a Minor Key"	Stuart Hagmann	Ed Adamson	February 8, 1969
Mannix searches for Peggy's boyfriend, but is forced to deal with an enigmatic police chief, a bigoted waitress and an interloper. Yaphet Kotto, Anthony Zerbe guest star
43	19	"End Game"	John Llewellyn Moxey	Cliff Gould	February 15, 1969
A court-martialed veteran plots revenge against the last survivors of his combat unit - a policeman and Mannix.
44	20	"All Around the Money Tree"	Murray Golden	Donn Mullally	February 22, 1969
A glib thief double-crosses Mannix after luring him into a Scotland Yard case.
45	21	"The Odds Against Donald Jordan"	Stuart Hagmann	Chester Krumholz	March 1, 1969
A man named Donald Jordan is in a tight spot - he owes loan sharks some money and someone is trying to kill him.
46	22	"Last Rites for Miss Emma"	Barry Crane	Albert Beich and William H. Wright	March 8, 1969
Peggy finds herself attracted to the prime suspect in a narcotics robbery.
47	23	"The Solid Gold Web"	Sutton Roley	Blake Ritchie	March 22, 1969
Mannix attempts to find the reason for his ex-girlfriend's despair - unaware she accidentally killed her latest lover.
48	24	"Merry Go Round for Murder"	Sutton Roley	John Meredyth Lucas and Arthur Dales	April 5, 1969
Mannix attempts to connect a murder and a missing fortune to a Las Vegas racket.
49	25	"To Catch a Rabbit"	Harry Harvey, Jr.	Shirl Hendryx and Shimon Wincelberg	April 12, 1969
An angry murder suspect (Frank Ramírez) claims the death was an accident and the victim (Jack Bannon) took $800 from him. Gail Kobe and Pilar Seurat guest star.
