= Mannix season 6 =

Mannix
- Season 6
- No. of episodes: 24

Release
- Original network: CBS
- Original release: September 17, 1972 – March 11, 1973

Season chronology
- ← Previous; Season 5 Next → Season 7

This is a list of episodes from the sixth season of Mannix.

== Broadcast history ==
The season originally aired Sundays at 9:30-10:30 pm (EST) from September 17 to December 24, 1972 and at 8:30-9:30 pm (EST) from January 7 to March 11, 1973.

== Home media ==
The season was released on DVD by Paramount Home Video.

== Episodes ==
No. overall	No. in season	Title	Directed by	Written by	Original release date
123	1	"The Open Web"	Arnold Laven	Donn Mullally	September 17, 1972
A cop is out to catch a killer. John McLiam and Rip Torn guest star.
124	2	"Cry Silence"	Alf Kjellin	Oliver Crawford and Ed Waters	September 24, 1972
A former priest (Anthony Zerbe) who just heard a murder confession asks Mannix to find the killer - and tell him his secret is safe. Geoffrey Lewis, Joe Maross and Fay Spain guest star.
125	3	"The Crimson Halo"	Leslie H. Martinson	Shimon Wincelberg	October 1, 1972
A surgeon (Joseph Campanella, who played Mannix's boss Mr. Wickersham in season 1) is targeted for murder. Guest stars Burgess Meredith, Carol Ohmart, Laraine Stephens
126	4	"Broken Mirror"	David Lowell Rich	Leigh Vance and Robert Pirosh	October 8, 1972
A tycoon's wife (Anjanette Comer) is kidnapped.
127	5	"Portrait of a Hero"	Arnold Laven	John Meredyth Lucas	October 15, 1972
Mannix probes the murder of a Vietnam hero.
128	6	"The Inside Man"	Paul Krasny	A.A. Ross	October 22, 1972
Mannix infiltrates a crime ring in New Orleans.
129	7	"To Kill a Memory"	Sutton Roley	Arthur Weiss	October 29, 1972
Mannix attempts to uncover an amnesiac's past (Martin Sheen).
130	8	"The Upside Down Penny"	Arthur Marks	Robert W. Lenski	November 5, 1972
Mannix must find a child's missing stamp album, which is apparently worth killing for.
131	9	"One Step to Midnight"	Don McDougall	Warren Duff	November 12, 1972
The granddaughter of an exiled kingpin is being stalked by the syndicate.
132	10	"Harvest of Death"	Paul Krasny	Jerry Thomas	November 19, 1972
Mannix sets out to help a threatened orange grove.
133	11	"A Puzzle for One"	Jeffrey Hayden	David P. Harmon	November 26, 1972
Mannix pursues the man who murdered a private eye. Adam West and Nehemiah Persoff guest star.
134	12	"Lost Sunday"	Reza Badiyi	Story by : Ellis Marcus; Teleplay by : Ellis Marcus and Alfred Hayes	December 3, 1972
Although the records say a death was an accident, the victim's sister says it was murder.
135	13	"See No Evil"	Arnold Laven	Shimon Wincelberg	December 10, 1972
Mannix investigates a murder in spite of intimidated witnesses.
136	14	"Light and Shadow"	Sutton Roley	Richard Murphy and Harold Medford	December 17, 1972
A millionaire's wife is accused of murder.
137	15	"A Game of Shadows"	Gerald Mayer	Leigh Vance	December 24, 1972
Mannix pursues a mystery man who's wanted for murder.
138	16	"The Man Who Wasn't There"	Sutton Roley	Robert W. Lenski	January 7, 1973
Mannix is caught up in a deadly game concocted by a man who's out to kill him.
139	17	"A Matter of Principle"	Alf Kjellin	Howard Browne	January 14, 1973
Sisters (Elsa Lanchester, Ruth McDevitt) are out to prosecute a traffic violator who's also a syndicate killer.
140	18	"Out of the Night"	Paul Krasny	William H. Wright	January 21, 1973
Peggy takes the lead role in this episode as she poses as a prostitute to assist in the break-up of a narcotics ring. Mannix is only a supporting character in this episode.
141	19	"Carol Lockwood, Past Tense"	Leslie H. Martinson	Harold Medford and Blake Ritchie	January 28, 1973
Mannix sets to prove that his ex-girlfriend's death was no accident.
142	20	"The Faces of Murder"	Jeffrey Hayden	Robert W. Lenski and Stanley Roberts	February 4, 1973
Mannix's latest client is actually trying to prove herself guilty of murder.
143	21	"Search for a Whisper"	Arnold Laven	John Meredyth Lucas	February 18, 1973
Mannix is hired to find out if a political candidate (William Shatner) is a target for mudslingers. Note: This episode is a "near remake" of the season one episode Skid Marks on a Dry Run.
144	22	"To Quote a Dead Man"	Michael O'Herlihy	Story by : Richard L. Breen, Jr. & James T. Surtees; Teleplay by : Robert W. Lenski	February 25, 1973
A cheerful hobo (David Wayne) is being stalked by a murderer.
145	23	"A Problem of Innocence"	Don McDougall	Dan Ullman	March 4, 1973
The daughter (Anne Archer) of a dead thief is forced by a gang of crooks to find the loot they stole.
146	24	"The Danford File"	Harry Harvey, Jr.	Mann Rubin	March 11, 1973
A classy lady (Jessica Walter) is being blackmailed due to her unclassy past.
