= Mannix season 3 =

Mannix
- Season 3
- No. of episodes: 25

Release
- Original network: CBS
- Original release: September 27, 1969 – March 21, 1970

Season chronology
- ← Previous; Season 2 Next → Season 4

This is a list of episodes from the third season of Mannix.

== Broadcast history ==
The season originally aired Saturdays at 10:00-11:00 pm (EST).

== Home media ==
The season was released on DVD by Paramount Home Video.

== Episodes ==
| No. overall | No. in season | Title | Directed by | Written by | Original release date |
|---|---|---|---|---|---|
| 50 | 1 | "Eagles Sometimes Can't Fly" | Stuart Hagmann | Robert Heverly | September 27, 1969 |
Mannix must clear an African-American (Georg Stanford Brown) and a Native American (Geoffrey Deuel) of false murder accusations. Guest Star Robert Reed
| 51 | 2 | "Color Her Missing" | Michael Caffey | Donn Mullally | October 4, 1969 |
Mannix reluctantly helps the man (Jason Evers) who's been accused of killing one of the detective's colleagues. Virginia Gregg and Robert Reed guest star.
| 52 | 3 | "Return to Summer Grove" | Gerald Mayer | Cliff Gould | October 11, 1969 |
Mannix reunites with his father (Victor Jory) when returns to his hometown to solve a murder. Marion Ross and Vera Miles guest star.
| 53 | 4 | "The Playground" | Paul Krasny | Ed Adamson | October 18, 1969 |
Mannix must safeguard an obnoxious movie star (Robert Conrad).
| 54 | 5 | "A Question of Midnight" | Sutton Roley | Barry Oringer | October 25, 1969 |
Mannix faces obstacles in his investigation of a hospital scandal. Barbara Babcock, Lee Meriwether, Logan Ramsey, and Tom Troupe guest star.
| 55 | 6 | "A Penny for the Peep-Show" | Gerald Mayer | Stephen Kandel | November 1, 1969 |
Mannix deals with thieves, threats and red herrings in his search for a woman's (Sabrina Scharf) uncle.
| 56 | 7 | "A Sleep in the Deep" | Gerald Mayer | John Meredyth Lucas | November 8, 1969 |
Mannix suspects that the drowning of a swimming ace is actually murder. Marianna Hill, Milton Selzer, and Angel Tompkins guest star.
| 57 | 8 | "Memory: Zero" | Harry Harvey, Jr. | Lionel E. Siegel and Ric Vollaerts | November 22, 1969 |
Mannix hunts down a killer bent on silencing the secretary (Katherine Justice) of a recently murdered detective.
| 58 | 9 | "The Nowhere Victim" | Sutton Roley | Dan Ullman | November 29, 1969 |
A hit-and-run victim disappears from the scene of the accident - and a murder contract could explain it.
| 59 | 10 | "The Sound of Darkness" | Corey Allen | Barry Trivers | December 6, 1969 |
Mannix makes plans to trap a killer while going through psychosomatic blindness.
| 60 | 11 | "Who Killed Me?" | Harry Harvey, Jr. | Stephen Kandel | December 13, 1969 |
An alleged plane-crash victim turns up alive with tales of attempted murder. Yvonne Craig guest stars.
| 61 | 12 | "Missing: Sun and Sky" | Sutton Roley | Cliff Gould and Norman Katkov & Halstead Welles | December 20, 1969 |
When a million-dollar racehorse is kidnapped, Mannix finds himself in a case that has no apparent motive.
| 62 | 13 | "Tooth of the Serpent" | Paul Krasny | Robert Lewin | December 27, 1969 |
A tough cop works on a robbery case that may involve his missing son.
| 63 | 14 | "Medal for a Hero" | Seymour Robbie | Frank Telford | January 3, 1970 |
Mannix investigates a series of robberies that implicate Peggy's late policeman husband. Terry Carter plays Peggy's husband, Marcus, in flashbacks.
| 64 | 15 | "Walk with a Dead Man" | Harvey Hart | Ed Adamson | January 10, 1970 |
Mannix is framed for murder.
| 65 | 16 | "A Chance at the Roses" | Nick Webster | Lionel E. Siegel | January 17, 1970 |
Guest stars include Ted de Corsia, Scott Brady and Leslie Charleson. Mannix looks into a supposedly open-and-shut robbery case.
| 66 | 17 | "Blind Mirror" | Nick Webster | Don Brinkley | January 24, 1970 |
Mannix is confronted with attempted murder and romantic entanglements in his search for a woman who ran away after witnessing a near-drowning. Mike Farrell Guest Star
| 67 | 18 | "Harlequin's Gold" | Gerald Mayer | Don Brinkley and Oliver Crawford | January 31, 1970 |
Mannix looks for a survivor of a disaster at sea that may have been caused by pirates.
| 68 | 19 | "Who Is Sylvia?" | Reza Badiyi | Alfred Brenner | February 7, 1970 |
Mannix must find out who's trying to murder a quiet young matron. Larry Linville guest star
| 69 | 20 | "Only One Death to a Customer" | Michael O'Herlihy | John Meredyth Lucas | February 14, 1970 |
Mannix pursues a vengeful ghost from his past.
| 70 | 21 | "Fly, Little One" | Murray Golden | Arthur Weiss | February 21, 1970 |
A mentally disturbed child (Pamelyn Ferdin) helps Mannix find a murderer. Lawrence Dane, Julie Gregg, and Woodrow Parfrey
| 71 | 22 | "The Search for Darrell Andrews" | Seymour Robbie | John Kneubuhl | February 28, 1970 |
Peggy & her son Toby are put in danger when Mannix possesses a role of film that reveals the mastermind behind a bank robbery. Dana Elcar and Van Williams guest star.
| 72 | 23 | "Murder Revisited" | Harvey Hart | Ed Adamson | March 7, 1970 |
Twin sisters (Arlene Martel) are implicated in a murder that took place while the victim was on the phone with a TV interviewer. Don DeFore guest star.
| 73 | 24 | "War of Nerves" | Rowe Wallerstein | Barry Trivers | March 14, 1970 |
Mannix finds himself in a web of lies and subterfuge while searching for a horsewoman who disappeared just before a county fair. Hugh Beaumont, Med Flory and Paul Picerni guest star.
| 74 | 25 | "Once Upon a Saturday" | Barry Crane | Arline Anderson and Barry Crane | March 21, 1970 |
Mannix faces hostility while figuring out who's tormenting carnival-troupe boss Bev Miller (Bethel Leslie). Michael Conrad and Gordon Jump guest star.
