= Mannix season 1 =

Mannix
- Season 1
- No. of episodes: 24

Release
- Original network: CBS
- Original release: September 16, 1967 – March 16, 1968

Season chronology
- Next → Season 2

This is a list of episodes from the first season of Mannix.

== Broadcast history ==
The season originally aired Saturdays at 10:00-11:00 pm (EST).

== Home media ==
The season was released on DVD by Paramount Home Video.

== Episodes ==
| No. overall | No. in season | Title | Directed by | Written by | Original release date |
|---|---|---|---|---|---|
| 1 | 1 | "The Name Is Mannix" | Leonard J. Horn | Bruce Geller | September 16, 1967 |
Detective Joe Mannix attempts to rescue the daughter (Barbara Anderson) of an ex-mob boss (Lloyd Nolan) from kidnappers. John Colicos and Kim Hunter guest star.
| 2 | 2 | "Skid Marks on a Dry Run" | John Meredyth Lucas | John Meredyth Lucas | September 23, 1967 |
Mannix tries to look up the background of a wealthy client intending to run for governor. Vincent Gardenia, Marian McCargo, and Vic Perrin guest star.
| 3 | 3 | "Nothing Ever Works Twice" | Murray Golden | Chester Krumholz | September 30, 1967 |
Mannix is the prime suspect in the murder of an old flame's husband. Gloria DeHaven guest stars.
| 4 | 4 | "The Many Deaths of Saint Christopher" | John Meredyth Lucas | Barry Oringer | October 7, 1967 |
Mannix must find a chemist who's run off with a secret formula. Neil Diamond, David Hurst, John Marley, and Linda Marsh guest star.
| 5 | 5 | "Make It Like It Never Happened" | Leonard J. Horn | Lee Loeb | October 14, 1967 |
Mannix assists a little girl in getting her father off death row. Phillip Pine, John Randolph, Logan Ramsey, Letícia Román, and Elena Verdugo guest star.
| 6 | 6 | "The Cost of a Vacation" | John Meredyth Lucas | Chester Krumholz | October 21, 1967 |
Mannix finds a murdered colleague while searching for a missing person. Marlyn Mason and Donnelly Rhodes guest star.
| 7 | 7 | "Warning: Live Blueberries" | Vincent McEveety | Story by : Arthur Dales; Teleplay by : Barry Oringer | October 28, 1967 |
Mannix searches a hippie retreat for a missing girl. Brooke Bundy, Valora Noland, and Tom Skerritt guest star. Cameo: Buffalo Springfield
| 8 | 8 | "Beyond the Shadow of a Dream" | Leonard J. Horn | Laurence Heath | November 4, 1967 |
Mannix has to find out who's trying to put a high-strung woman back into a mental hospital. Richard Mulligan, Pat Priest, and Herb Voland guest star.
| 9 | 9 | "Huntdown" | Gerald Mayer | Richard Landau | November 18, 1967 |
Mannix tries to deal with an injured foot in an isolated cowtown, which is hiding a terrible secret. Steve Ihnat, Ford Rainey, Sandra Smith, and Paul Stevens guest star.
| 10 | 10 | "Coffin for a Clown" | Alexander Singer | Story by : Chester Krumholz & Robert Bloomfield; Teleplay by : Chester Krumholz | November 25, 1967 |
Mannix finds himself on both sides in a child-custody case - he must mediate for the mother (Whitney Blake) and protect the father (Gabriel Dell) from assassins. Christopher Knight (credited as Christopher A. Knight), Laraine Stephens, Norman Fell and Diana Muldaur guest star.
| 11 | 11 | "A Catalogue of Sins" | Lee H. Katzin | Walter Brough | December 2, 1967 |
Mannix investigates a case of blackmail that's come from a psychiatrist's stolen files. Joe Mantell, Joe Maross, and Fay Spain guest star.
| 12 | 12 | "Turn Every Stone" | John Meredyth Lucas | Jeri Emmett | December 9, 1967 |
Mannix investigates a million-dollar libel suit filed against a crusading publisher. Linden Chiles, Dabbs Greer, Lloyd Gough, and Nita Talbot guest star.
| 13 | 13 | "Run, Sheep, Run" | Gene Reynolds | Howard Browne | December 16, 1967 |
Mannix is asked to help the police sniff out cops tied to a vice ring. John Abbott, Ruta Lee, Malachi Throne, and Joyce Van Patten guest star.
| 14 | 14 | "Then the Drink Takes the Man" | Laslo Benedek | Sam Ross | December 30, 1967 |
Mannix must find out why a teetotaler is spending all his time and money at a Mexican retreat for alcoholics.
| 15 | 15 | "Falling Star" | Denis Sanders | Dorothy Herald | January 6, 1968 |
Mannix probes attempts on the life of a movie star (Jan Sterling) who's about to publish her explosive memoirs. Gail Fisher who would join the cast the next season as Mannix's secretary Peggy Fair played a reporter in this episode.
| 16 | 16 | "License to Kill: Limit Three People" | John Meredyth Lucas | Lew Erwin | January 13, 1968 |
Mannix must prove an escaped mental patient's innocence in a series of murders that took place following his breakout. Karen Black guest stars.
| 17 | 17 | "Deadfall: Part 1" | Leonard J. Horn | Chester Krumholz | January 20, 1968 |
Intertect is accused of robbing its own client. Antoinette Bower, Roscoe Lee Browne, Dana Elcar, Beverly Garland, and Michael Tolan guest star
| 18 | 18 | "Deadfall: Part 2" | Leonard J. Horn | Chester Krumholz | January 27, 1968 |
Mannix uses a risky strategy to solve a case of espionage and save his boss.
| 19 | 19 | "You Can Get Killed Out There" | Louis Brandt | Dorothy Herald | February 3, 1968 |
Mannix must find the man who stole a necklace. Howard Da Silva and Marianna Hill guest star.
| 20 | 20 | "Another Final Exit" "The Box" | Ralph Senensky | Chester Krumholz and Teddi Sherman | February 10, 1968 |
Mannix's latest client is Bernie Farmer (Larry Storch), a frighted victim of circumstances. Paul Comi and Grace Lee Whitney guest stars.
| 21 | 21 | "Eight to Five, It's a Miracle" | Harry Harvey, Jr. | Story by : Maureen Daly; Teleplay by : Dorothy Herald | February 17, 1968 |
Mannix becomes a devil's advocate to probe a supposed miracle that happened on a gangster's property. Bruce Gordon and William Smithers guest star.
| 22 | 22 | "Delayed Action" | Michael O'Herlihy | Barry Oringer | March 2, 1968 |
The first clue in a mysterious hit-and-run leads Mannix to a rehab center where discovers that the case is connected to a 20-year-old crime. Richard Bull, Ned Glass, Walter Koenig, Ronald Long, and Louise Sorel guest star.
| 23 | 23 | "To Kill a Writer" | Charles Rondeau | Ben Gershman & David Braverman | March 9, 1968 |
Mannix attempts to protect a mystery writer (Michael Strong) from murder, but the writer isn't helping by trying to play sleuth. Ted Cassidy and Paul Petersen guest stars.
| 24 | 24 | "The Girl in the Frame" | Barry Crane | Wilton Schiller | March 16, 1968 |
Mannix discovers an art forgery involving a model (Leslie Parrish) who posed for a fake Renoir. Paul Mantee and William Windom guest star.
