= A Man Called Shenandoah =

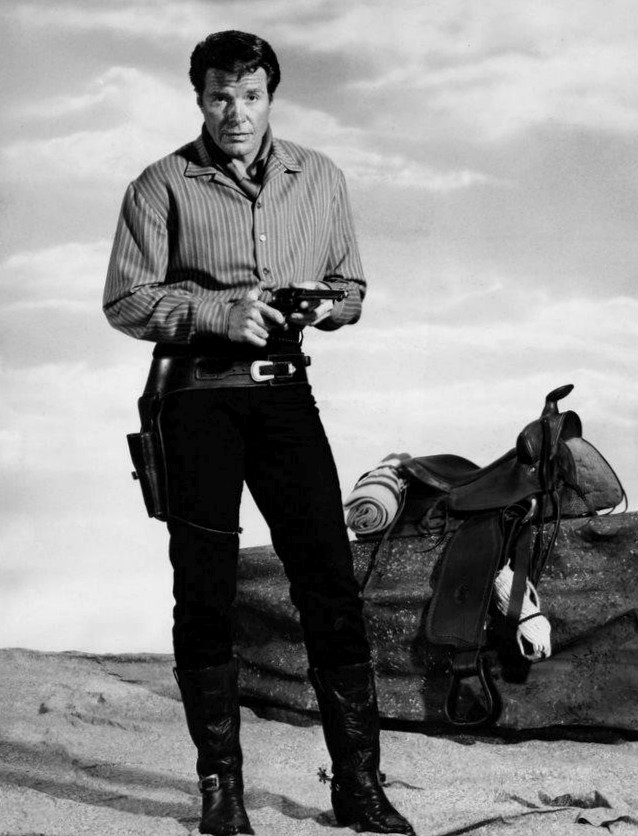
- Robert Horton in the title role.
- Genre: Western
- Written by: Ed Adamson; Robert C. Dennis; Robert Hamner; E. Jack Neuman; Samuel A. Peeples; Paul Savage; Daniel B. Ullman
- Directed by: David Alexander; Murray Golden; Tom Gries; Harry Harris; Nathan H. Juran; Joseph H. Lewis; Don McDougall; Jud Taylor
- Starring: Robert Horton
- Opening theme: "Oh Shenandoah"
- Country of origin: United States
- Original language: English
- No. of seasons: 1
- No. of episodes: 34

Production
- Producer: Robert Hamner
- Running time: 25 mins.
- Production companies: Bronze Enterprises; MGM Television

Original release
- Network: ABC
- Release: September 13, 1965 – May 16, 1966

A Man Called Shenandoah is an American Western television series that aired Monday evenings on ABC-TV from September 13, 1965, to May 16, 1966. Reruns then continued until September 5, 1966. It was produced by MGM Television. Some of the location work for the 34 half-hour black and white episodes were filmed in California's Sierra Nevada and Mojave Desert.

The series starred Robert Horton, who had costarred on Wagon Train from 1957 to 1962. He left that series, vowing never to do another television western, but agreed to star in A Man Called Shenandoah because he felt the show would be a great opportunity for him as an actor. The series is set in 1870 and portrays an amnesiac facing hardship and danger while trying to unravel his identity and his past.

== Overview ==
Robert Horton plays a man who was shot and left for dead. In the premiere episode, two buffalo hunters find him out on the prairie and, thinking he might be an outlaw, take him to the nearest town in hopes of receiving reward money. When he regains consciousness, he has no recollection of who he was, or why anyone would want to harm him. The doctor who treats his wounds gives him the name "Shenandoah," stating the word means "land of silence".

For the remainder of the series, Shenandoah roams the West in search of clues to his identity. He learns that he had been a Union officer during the American Civil War, and comes to believe that he had been married. The final episode, "Macauley's Cure", ends with Mrs. Macauley telling Shenandoah: "It's not always important who you are; it's always important what you are."

Among the guest stars on the series were John Anderson, Robert Anderson, Claude Akins, Ed Asner, Elisha Cook Jr., Jeanne Cooper, Richard H. Cutting, John Dehner, Bruce Dern, Elinor Donahue, Leif Erickson, Beverly Garland, Sally Kellerman, DeForest Kelley, George Kennedy, Martin Landau, Cloris Leachman, John McIntire, Martin Milner, Leonard Nimoy, Jeanette Nolan, Warren Oates, Susan Oliver, Joyce Van Patten, James Doohan, Alfred Shelly and Michael Witney.

== Theme song ==
The show's theme song was the traditional American folk tune "Oh Shenandoah", with new, specialized lyrics written by Horton himself. Horton, who had performed in musical theater, also sang the song. His recording became a Columbia single in 1965. It is from Horton's Columbia album The Man Called Shenandoah (Cs-9208, stereo; Cl-2408, mono; both 1965).

The series was popular on Rhodesian Television (RTV) in central Africa, and the song, reworked by local talent Nick Taylor, reached Number 3 on the Rhodesian Broadcasting Corporation hit parade.

== Broadcast ==
When reruns of the series aired on Turner Network Television in the 1990s, only 29 of the 34 episodes were rebroadcast. Since 2017, A Man Called Shenandoah has aired in the United States on the GetTV network, as part of their Western-themed programming block.

In February 2014, Warner Archive Instant offered all 34 uncut episodes as part of their streaming service.

== Episodes ==
No.	Title	Directed by	Written by	Original release date	Prod. code
1	"The Onslaught"	Paul Wendkos	Story by : E. Jack Neuman; Teleplay by : Norman Katkov	September 13, 1965	8026
2	"Survival"	Boris Sagal	E. Jack Neuman	September 20, 1965	8001
3	"The Fort"	Don McDougall	Sam Ross	September 27, 1965	8004
4	"The Caller"	David Alexander	Daniel Mainwaring	October 11, 1965	8009
5	"The Debt"	John English	Jack Turley	October 18, 1965	8032
6	"Obion – 1866"	Harry Harris	Robert C. Dennis	October 25, 1965	8029
7	"The Verdict"	Thomas Carr	Daniel B. Ullman	November 1, 1965	8031
8	"Town on Fire"	Nathan Juran	Robert Hamner	November 8, 1965	8039
9	"Incident at Dry Creek"	Joseph H. Lewis	Antony Ellis	November 15, 1965	8028
10	"The Locket"	Harry Harris	Samuel A. Peeples	November 22, 1965	8037
11	"The Reward"	Nathan Juran	Robert C. Dennis	November 29, 1965	8036
12	"A Special Talent for Killing"	Harry Harris	Robert Hamner	December 6, 1965	8047
13	"The Siege"	Jud Taylor	Robert C. Dennis	December 13, 1965	8046
14	"The Bell"	David Alexander	Terence Maples	December 20, 1965	8022
15	"The Young Outlaw"	Don McDougall	Frank Gruber	December 27, 1965	8019
16	"The Accused"	Byron Paul	Story by : Herman Groves; Teleplay by : Joseph Calvelli & Herman Groves	January 3, 1966	8035
17	"Run, Killer, Run"	Nathan Juran	Paul Savage	January 10, 1966	8033
18	"Rope's End"	Virgil Vogel	Daniel B. Ullman	January 17, 1966	8043
19	"The Lost Diablo"	Jerry Hopper	Samuel A. Peeples	January 24, 1966	8045
20	"A Long Way Home"	Lewis Allen	Robert Hamner	January 31, 1966	8051
21	"End of a Legend"	Jud Taylor	Robert Hamner	February 7, 1966	8058
22	"Run and Hide"	Tom Gries	Robert C. Dennis	February 14, 1966	8048
23	"The Riley Brand"	Jud Taylor	Charles Hoffman	February 21, 1966	8057
24	"Muted Fifes, Muffled Drums"	Jud Taylor	Robert Hamner	February 28, 1966	8062
25	"Plunder"	Joseph H. Lewis	Daniel B. Ullman	March 7, 1966	8054
26	"Marlee"	Jud Taylor	Adrian Spies	March 14, 1966	8065
27	"The Death of Matthew Eldridge"	Joseph H. Lewis	Ed Adamson & Paul Savage	March 21, 1966	8049
28	"Aces and Kings"	Jud Taylor	Robert Hamner	March 28, 1966	8067
29	"The Impostor"	Nathan Juran	Daniel B. Ullman	April 4, 1966	8068
30	"An Unfamiliar Tune"	Tom Gries	Theodore Apstein & Tony Barrett	April 11, 1966	8060
31	"The Clown"	Nathan Juran	Ed Adamson	April 18, 1966	8070
32	"Requiem for the Second"	Murray Golden	Robert Hamner	May 2, 1966	8071
33	"Care of General Delivery"	Nathan Juran	Story by : Robert C. Dennis; Teleplay by : Ed Adamson	May 9, 1966	8066
34	"Macauley's Cure"	Murray Golden	Ed Adamson	May 16, 1966	8072

== Home media ==
On May 8, 2018, Warner Bros. released A Man Called Shenandoah – The Complete Series on DVD via their Warner Archive Collection. This is a manufacture-on-demand (MOD) release, available through Warner's online store and Amazon.com. A Blu-ray presentation made from new 4K resolution scans of the original negatives of the entire series and it was released by Warner Archive Collection on November 2, 2024.

== Reception ==
A Man Called Shenandoah had a strong start in the Nielsen ratings, but Boyd Magers later noted, "stiff timeslot competition doomed Shenandoah after 34 half-hour episodes... and the series was cancelled on May 16, 1966, after 34 episodes, offering no resolution to Shenandoah's search for truth."
