= Serpico (TV series) =

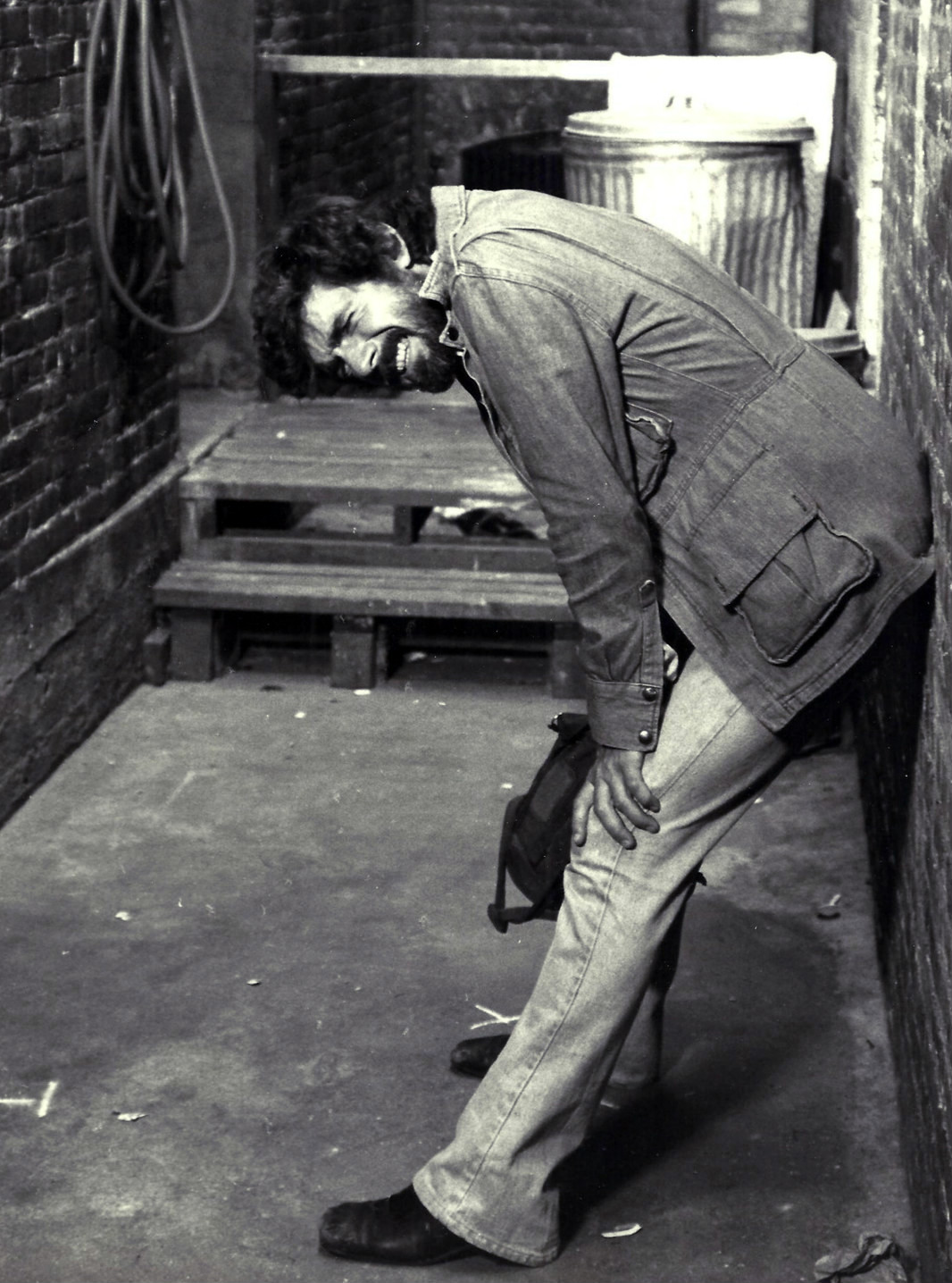
- David Birney in a scene from the episode "Rapid Fire", 1976
- Genre: Crime drama
- Based on: Serpico by Peter Maas
- Developed by: Robert Collins
- Written by: Robert Collins; Robert Hamilton; Peter Maas; Shimon Wincelberg
- Directed by: Reza Badiyi; Michael Caffey; Art Fisher; Robert Markowitz; Sigmund Neufeld Jr. Paul Stanley; Steven Hilliard Stern
- Starring: David Birney; Tom Atkins
- Composer: Elmer Bernstein
- Country of origin: United States
- Original language: English
- No. of seasons: 1
- No. of episodes: 15 (1 unaired)

Production
- Executive producer: Emmet G. Lavery Jr.
- Producers: Don Ingalls; Emmet G. Lavery Jr. Barry Oringer
- Cinematography: Donald M. Morgan
- Editors: Patrick Kennedy; Neil MacDonald; Gerard Wilson
- Running time: 60 minutes
- Production companies: Emmet G. Lavery, Jr. Productions; Paramount Television

Original release
- Network: NBC
- Release: September 24, 1976 – January 28, 1977

Serpico is an American crime drama series that aired on NBC from September 24, 1976, until January 28, 1977. The series was based on the book by Peter Maas and the 1973 film of the same name that starred Al Pacino in the title role. A television movie, Serpico: The Deadly Game, served as pilot and aired in April 1976.

== Summary ==
David Birney stars as the unorthodox NYPD detective Frank Serpico who battles corrupt members of the police force. Tom Atkins co-stars as Lieutenant Tom Sullivan. The series aired 14 episodes before being canceled in January 1977 and replaced with Quincy, M.E.

== Cast ==
- David Birney as Frank Serpico
- Tom Atkins as Lt. Tom Sullivan

== Production notes ==
Iranian director Reza Badiyi served as one of several directors of the series. Serpico's theme song was written by Elmer Bernstein.

== Episodes ==
| No. | Title | Directed by | Written by | Original release date |
|---|---|---|---|---|
| 0 | "The Deadly Game" | Robert L. Collins | Robert Collins | April 24, 1976 |
2-hour pilot: The story of Officer Frank Serpico, a New York City cop who fought crime in the city and corruption in the police department.
| 1 | "Country Boy" | Reza Badiyi | Robert Dellinger | September 24, 1976 |
Ex-convict Elrod Davis looks up fellow ex-con Gary Baker to become the "driver" in a bank robbery. Serpico joins the hold-up team and convinces Baker, who is married, to drop out. Before Baker leaves he betrays Serpico.
| 2 | "The Traitor In Our Midst" | Michael Caffey | Robert Hamilton | October 1, 1976 |
After several unsuccessful attempts to close down Tiller's numbers racket, Serpico and Sullivan suspect a leak within the task force. The chief suspect is Serpico's childhood friend and gubernatorial candidate Assistant District Attorney Bobby Delaney.
| 3 | "The Indian" | Art Fisher | Pamela Wallace | October 8, 1976 |
Several attempts to break a drug ring headed by "The Indian" fail. Serpico intentionally tips off The Indian's go-between Grace to an upcoming raid. He gets suspended but gains The Indian's trust. Serpico wants to meet and personally bust The Indian. Serpico reunites drug courier Heather with her father, and he has romantic interest in the hospital doctor caring for Heather.
| 4 | "Every Man Must Pay His Dues" | Robert Michael Lewis | Brad Radnitz | October 29, 1976 |
Serpico must protect John Maloney, a presidential candidate for the truck drivers' union, from an assassination ordered by current leader Jack Powell. Maloney's daughter Rita falls for Serpico. Vern Ross, Maloney's right-hand man, has a crush on Rita and secretly works for Powell.
| 5 | "Strike!" | David Moessinger | Story by : Richard Danus & Robert Dellinger; Teleplay by : Richard Danus | November 5, 1976 |
Jenny, one of Serpico's ex-girlfriends, helps two men steal furs in the garment district. With Jenny's help, Serpico passes himself off as a fur designer. A sting operation fails and Serpico realizes he told Jenny about it; he confronts her and Jenny reveals that she was blackmailed. When Jenny double-crosses the robbers, her life is in jeopardy.
| 6 | "Trumpet of Time" | Robert Markowitz | Story by : Sandor Stern & Susan Lester; Teleplay by : Sandor Stern & Richard Danus | November 12, 1976 |
Vince Cipolla, a 20-year veteran on the police force, is dying of leukemia and wants to leave money for his wife. He gives confidential information on the locations of gambling and prostitution houses to two criminals who share their ill-gotten gains with Cipolla. Serpico follows the clues to Cipolla, who once instructed him, and tries to help.
| 7 | "Prime Evil" | Sigmund Neufeld Jr. | Story by : Sean Baine & Robert Dellinger & Richard Danus; Teleplay by : Richard Danus | November 26, 1976 |
Sullivan assigns Serpico to gain the confidence of a sadistic loan shark, Alex Demico. Marion Wagner, an undercover officer, plays the dangerous role as Demico's woman.
| 8 | "Rapid Fire" | Alex March | David H. Vowell | December 10, 1976 |
Serpico is on the trail of arms broker Raoul Christie who is illegally selling M-16s to criminals. Serpico gets caught in a department turf war when he gets Christie's man Lincoln killed; Lincoln was an informant. Serpico befriends Christie's favorite prostitute, Erica Molinas.
| 9 | "Dawn of the Furies" | Paul Stanley | Robert Malcolm Young | December 17, 1976 |
Serpico, posing as an explosives expert, tries to learn the plans of a group of revolutionaries. Kirko suspects Serpico is a cop. Lucy, the sister of leader Jerry, falls for Serpico.
| 10 | "The Serbian Connection" | Reza Badiyi | Cliff Osmond | December 24, 1976 |
Serpico gathers evidence against Nagel, who owns a cargo shipping business that smuggles Serbians into the United States for a price. Serpico tries to help an illegal immigrant Serbian brother and sister, who know about the smuggling operation, from being deported.
| 11 | "Danger Zone" | David Moessinger | Paul Casey | December 31, 1976 |
Atkins assigns Serpico to work with Duffy, a veteran detective who's part of a task force trying to bust Eddie Pickett, a drug dealer and ex-cop. Serpico doesn't like Duffy because he's reckless and a "showboat."
| 12 | "Sanctuary" | Steven Hilliard Stern | Shimon Wincelberg | January 7, 1977 |
Magda is a Soviet gymnast who wants to defect. After nearly being kidnapped by a serial killer, she finds sanctuary in a synagogue where Rabbi Shotness promises to help. Magda explains that her parents, who are in the Soviet Union, will be in Vienna in two days where they will seek political asylum; Magda doesn't want news of her defection made public until her parents are safe. However, Serpico desperately wants Magda because she can identify the serial killer who kidnaps women, rapes them, then kills them with an ice pick to the heart. Meanwhile, the Soviet secret police are also looking for Magda.
| 13 | "The Party of Your Choice" | Gerald Mayer | Walter Dallenbach | January 14, 1977 |
Serpico looks for the killer who targets women campaigning for mayoral candidate Gene Rincon. After Serpico discovers that a shady real estate businessman has contributed money to Rincon's campaign, he suspects that Rincon himself is involved with the murders.
| 14 | "One Long Tomorrow" | David Moessinger | Ray Brenner | January 28, 1977 |
Marcus, a young adult, watches a gang throw a woman off a roof. Serpico and other officers search for Marcus in order to protect him from the gang. Marcus's school teacher, Michelle, knows where he is, and Serpico tries to convince her to tell him.
| 15 | "A Secret Place" | Steven Hilliard Stern | Robert Malcolm Young | N/A |
Serpico is assigned to protect state witness Viveca who is scheduled to testify before a grand jury in three days. Sullivan assigns Carol Hinterman to assist Serpico, who has his doubts about her abilities. Mobster Vitorio La Bella is desperate to kill Viveca at any cost.
