= The New Perry Mason =

- Genre: Legal drama Crime drama
- Created by: Erle Stanley Gardner
- Written by: Ernie Frankel; Erle Stanley Gardner
- Directed by: Murray Golden; Arthur Marks; Michael O'Herlihy; E. W. Swackhamer
- Starring: Monte Markham
- Composer: Earle H. Hagen
- Country of origin: United States
- Original language: English
- No. of seasons: 1
- No. of episodes: 15

Production
- Executive producer: Cornwell Jackson
- Producers: Ernie Frankel; Art Seid
- Running time: 60 mins.
- Production companies: Paisano Productions; 20th Century Fox Television

Original release
- Network: CBS
- Release: September 16, 1973 – January 27, 1974

Related
- Perry Mason (1957–66); Perry Mason television films (1985–95)

The New Perry Mason is a CBS TV series that ran from 1973 to 1974. It was a revival of the 1957 Perry Mason television series about Erle Stanley Gardner's brilliant defense attorney.

== Plot ==
All of the major characters of the original series appeared in the revival, along with Gertie, a receptionist seldom seen in the original (and played by Connie Cezon, in the original, on the few occasions when she was), and the plots and their devices were along the lines of the original. The familiar theme song of the original, "Park Avenue Beat", was replaced by a generic dramatic fanfare.

== Cast ==
- Monte Markham as Perry Mason
- Sharon Acker as Della Street
- Albert Stratton as Paul Drake
- Dane Clark as Lt. Arthur Tragg
- Harry Guardino as Hamilton Burger
- Brett Somers as Gertie Lade

== Production ==
=== Development ===
While several production personnel had worked on the original Perry Mason series (including executive producer Cornwell Jackson, producers Ernie Frankel and Art Seid, and director Arthur Marks), the series was made without the participation of any members of the original cast, with Monte Markham taking over the role that Raymond Burr played in the original series. Produced by 20th Century Fox Television, it aired Sundays at 7:30 pm (EST) on CBS, the same network which had aired the original series, during the 1973–74 season. A total of 15 episodes were produced and aired.

=== Cancellation ===
This revival was cancelled at midseason, after failing to overtake its two hit rivals, NBC's The Wonderful World of Disney and ABC's The F.B.I. in the ratings in its Sunday night time slot. It ranked 71st out of 80 shows airing that season, with a 13.1 household rating. It was soon replaced by Apple's Way, which also failed in the same time slot.

== Episodes ==
No.	Title	Directed by	Written by	Original release date
1	"The Case of the Horoscope Homicide"	Leo Penn	Orville H. Hampton	September 16, 1973
A distraught widow is accused of murdering her astrologer husband, a conniving stargazer whose fortunes controlled the fortune of a cosmetics tycoon.
2	"The Case of the Prodigal Prophet"	Robert Day	Gerry Day	September 23, 1973
A young religious crusader's past in pornography leads to him being blackmailed for $100,000 and eventually charged with murder.
3	"The Case of the Ominous Oath"	John Llewellyn Moxey	Unknown	September 30, 1973
A mechanic is defended by Mason in his retrial for the murder of a prominent physician. The first trial ended in a hung jury that voted 11-to-1 to convict.
4	"The Case of the Wistful Widower"	Leo Penn	Ernie Frankel, Orville H. Hampton	October 7, 1973
When two men, one wanted by the law and the other by a crime syndicate killer, exchange identities, the result is murder.
5	"The Case of the Telltale Trunk"	Arthur Marks	Robert W. Lenski	October 14, 1973
When the body of a missing millionaire, dead more than four years, turns up in Hong Kong, Mason is called upon to defend the man who admits planning the murder as a morbid joke.
6	"The Case of the Deadly Deeds"	Arthur Marks	Unknown	October 21, 1973
Mason defends a big-time gambler on a murder charge, with complications setting in when Mason must also defend his client in an action for custody of his daughter.
7	"The Case of the Murdered Murderer"	Lee Madden	Gerry Day	October 28, 1973
Perry is hard-pressed to prove the innocence of his client, a brilliant inventor, when he is discovered standing over a dead man with a knife in his hand.
8	"The Case of the Furious Father"	Jeannot Szwarc	David P. Harmon	November 11, 1973
Lt. Tragg is on both sides of a murder case when he must arrest one of his men for murder, followed by his request to Mason to give him the best defense possible
9	"The Case of the Cagey Cager"	Michael O'Herlihy	Orville H. Hampton	November 25, 1973
Mugged in a crowded parking lot by an ex-basketball player who once had a million-dollar future, Mason turns around to defend the young man when he's charged with murder.
10	"The Case of the Jailed Justice"	Murray Golden	Ernie Frankel, Orville H. Hampton	December 2, 1973
A Los Angeles judge with a reputation for being tough is arrested for poisoning his wheeler-dealer son-in-law, and then tries to tell Mason how to conduct his defense.
11	"The Case of the Spurious Spouse"	E. W. Swackhamer	Larry Alexander	December 9, 1973
A Vietnamese girl (Irene Tsu) is charged with murdering a man she claims is her husband.
12	"The Case of the Frenzied Feminist"	Murray Golden	Lou Shaw	December 16, 1973
Mason defends the fiery and beautiful editor of a women's liberation magazine on a charge of murdering a publisher who gave her job to another woman.
13	"The Case of the Perilous Pen"	E. W. Swackhamer	Donn Mullally	December 30, 1973
After an author, who wrote a book exposing the crime of a politician, winds up dead, his publisher asks for Mason's help with the case.
14	"The Case of the Tortured Titan"	Michael O'Herlihy	S. Bar-David, Ernie Frankel, Orville H. Hampton	January 13, 1974
A chance meeting with a beautiful young girl leads Mason to become her defense attorney when she's arrested for murder.
15	"The Case of the Violent Valley"	Herb Wallerstein	William Bast	January 27, 1974
The kidnapping of Mason's young counsel from the courtroom complicates his attempt to gain a fair trial for a man accused of murdering a hated ranch foreman in a rural California town.
