= Lloyd Gough =

American actor

- Gough in The Green Hornet, 1966
- Born: Michael Gough; September 21, 1907; New York City, NY, U.S.
- Died: July 23, 1984 (aged 76); Los Angeles, California, U.S.
- Other name: Lloyd Goff
- Occupation: Actor
- Years active: 1934–1982
- Spouse: Karen Morley (m. 1943)
- Children: 1

Lloyd Gough (born Michael Gough; September 21, 1907 – July 23, 1984) was an American theater, film, and television actor.

== Life and career ==
Born Michael Gough in New York City, he was a noted character actor.

Married to actress-turned-activist Karen Morley, both were brought before the House Un-American Activities Committee and when they invoked the Fifth Amendment they were blacklisted, effectively terminating their careers in Hollywood until the late 1960s.

In 1952, he appeared as the main villain in Rancho Notorious, but his name was removed from the credits due to the blacklist.

In 1966, he played Richard Bayler in the Perry Mason episode, "The Case of the Scarlet Scandal". Also in 1966, he played open minded fur hunter “Jacob Beamus” in S11E29's “The Treasure of John Walking Fox” on Gunsmoke.

Gough played Daily Sentinel crime reporter Mike Axford in the TV series The Green Hornet in 1966–67. In 1967, he guest-starred on Mannix as Senator Miniver in the episode “Turn Every Stone.”

He would later appear in a film about the Hollywood blacklist period, The Front (1976); his name was accompanied by his blacklist date.

Gough was married to Morley from 1943 until his death in 1984 from an aortic aneurysm at the age of 76. They had one child.

== Filmography ==
His films and shows include:

- Body and Soul (1947) - Roberts
- Black Bart (1948) - Sheriff Gordon
- All My Sons (1948) - Jim Bayliss
- River Lady (1948) - Mike Riley
- The Babe Ruth Story (1947) - Gambler Dalton
- A Southern Yankee (1948) - Capt. Steve Lorford
- That Wonderful Urge (1948) - Duffy - Chronicle Editor
- Tulsa (1949) - Bruce Tanner
- Roseanna McCoy (1949) - Phamer McCoy
- Always Leave Them Laughing (1949) - Monte Wilson
- Tension (1950) - Barney Deager
- Outside the Wall (1950) - Red Chaney
- Sunset Boulevard (1950) - Morino
- Storm Warning (1951) - Cliff Rummel
- Valentino (1951) - Eddie Morgan
- The Scarf (1951) - Dr. Gordon
- Rancho Notorious (1952) - Kinch (uncredited)
- Kentucky Jones (Episode "Wildcat Soup," 1964) - Mr. Baxter
- The Green Hornet (1966) - Mike Axford
- Tony Rome (1967) - Jules Langley
- Madigan (1968) - Earl Griffin
- The Sweet Ride (1968) - Parker
- Funny Girl (1968) - Bill Fallon, Lawyer (uncredited)
- Tell Them Willie Boy Is Here (1969) - Dexter
- The Great White Hope (1970) - Smitty
- My Old Man's Place (1971) - Dr. Paul
- Cannon (TV) Murder by Moonlight (1972)
- Executive Action (1973) - Charlie McCadden
- Earthquake (1974) - Cameron
- The Front (1976) - Herbert Delaney
- The Private Files of J. Edgar Hoover (1977) - Walter Winchell
- House Calls (1978) - Harry Grady
