= Apple's Way =

American television series

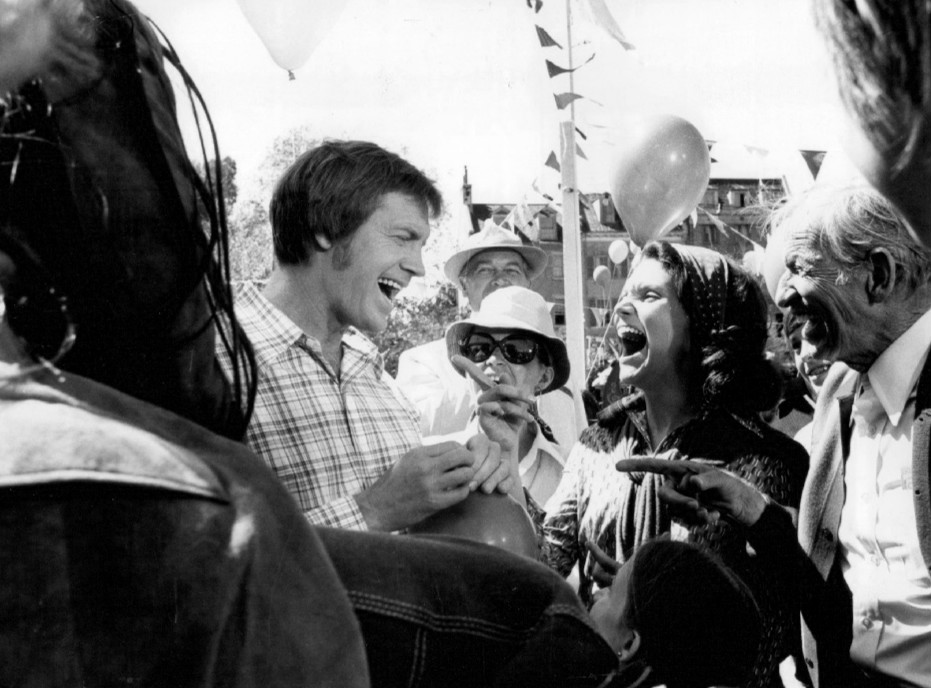
- Ronny Cox, Lee McCain and Malcolm Atterbury in a 1974 episode
- Genre: Drama
- Created by: Earl Hamner Jr.
- Starring: Ronny Cox; Frances Lee McCain; Malcolm Atterbury; Vince Van Patten; Patti Cohoon; Eric Olson; Frannie Michel; Kristy McNichol
- Composer: Morton Stevens
- Country of origin: United States
- Original language: English
- No. of seasons: 2
- No. of episodes: 28

Production
- Executive producers: Lee Rich; Earl Hamner
- Running time: 60 minutes
- Production company: Lorimar Productions

Original release
- Network: CBS
- Release: February 10, 1974 – January 12, 1975

Apple's Way is an American drama television series that aired on CBS from February 10, 1974, to January 12, 1975. It was created by Earl Hamner Jr.

== Premise ==
The Apples of Los Angeles—architect George, his wife Barbara, their children Paul, Cathy, Steven, and Patricia; and Grandfather Aldon—seek refuge from the hectic pace of city living and relocate to George's hometown of Appleton, Iowa, which was founded by his ancestors. The family has to adjust to a different culture and climate and to a slower pace of life. They live in a working grist mill that serves as a backdrop for the situations depicted in each episode. Well-meaning George often gets involved in causes that increased his family's tensions.

Apple's Way was a mid-season replacement for The New Perry Mason. The series did not gain the ratings CBS had hoped for, partly because it had to compete with NBC's long-running Top 20 hit The Wonderful World of Disney and ABC's popular crime drama The F.B.I.. The concept was "re-booted" in the second season to focus on plots that dealt more with social issues (such as freedom of speech, drug use, terminal illness) as opposed to the more rural-specific plots of the first season. The second season was produced by successful veteran producer-writer John Furia, Jr. Furia hired Worley Thorne as story editor. The series was canceled during its second season and replaced with Cher.

== Cast ==
- Ronny Cox as George Apple
- Frances Lee McCain as Barbara Apple
- Malcolm Atterbury as Grandfather Aldon
- Vince Van Patten as Paul Apple
- Patti Cohoon as Cathy Apple
- Eric Olson as Steven Apple
- Frannie Michel as Patricia Apple (1974)
- Kristy McNichol as Patricia Apple (1974–1975)

== Reception ==
John J. O'Connor of The New York Times gave Apple's Way a mixed review by explaining that it "could provide further respite from the glut of mindless 'action' series on television. Respite is needed, if not required, but 'human values' are not an automatic guarantee of quality and intelligence." Gary Deeb of the Chicago Tribune was more approving and colorful in his assessment by stating that "contrived or not, I liked it a lot. The formula of 'Humanistic-Nebbish-Triumphs-Over-The-System,' while certainly nothing new, sometimes does wondrous things for us hard-shell cynics.

== Episode list ==
=== Season 1: 1974 ===
No. overall	No. in season	Title	Directed by:	Written by:	Original release date	Prod. code
1	1	"The Tree"	Harry Harris	T : A. J. Carothers	February 10, 1974	438204
2	2	"The Musician"	Harry Harris	William Bast	February 17, 1974	438205
3	3	"The Zoo"	Nicholas Webster	Peter S. Beagle	February 24, 1974	438209
4	4	"The Teacher"	Jack Shea	Dale Eunson	March 3, 1974	438203
5	5	"The Miller"	Jack Shea	Max Hodge	March 10, 1974	438201
6	6	"The Coach"	Murray Golden	George Kirgo	March 24, 1974	438212
7	7	"The Witness"	Herschel Daugherty	S. A. Long	March 31, 1974	438213
8	8	"The Temptation"	Herschel Daugherty	Irv Pearlberg	April 7, 1974	438208
9	9	"The Applicant"	Harry Harris	John McGreevey	April 21, 1974	438214
10	10	"The Pen Pal"	Murray Golden	Irv Pearlberg	April 28, 1974	438215
11	11	"The Accident"	Harry Harris	Emily Shoemaker	May 5, 1974	438218
12	12	"The Fair"	Philip Leacock	Mathilde Ferro, Theodore Ferro	May 12, 1974	438216
13	13	"The Lamb"	Harry Harris	Kathleen Hite	May 19, 1974	438217

=== Season 2: 1974–75 ===
No. overall	No. in season	Title	Directed by:	Written by:	Original release date	Prod. code
14	1	"The Tornado"	Marc Daniels	T : Joseph Bonaduce; S/T : John T. Dugan	September 15, 1974	438210
15	2	"The Circus"	Marc Daniels	Austin Kalish, Irma Kalish	September 22, 1974	438222
16	3	"The Friend"	Hal Cooper	Lan O'Kun	September 29, 1974	438227
17	4	"The Returning"	David Moessinger	David Moessinger	October 6, 1974	438230
18	5	"The First Love"	James Sheldon	Don Appell	October 13, 1974	438229
19	6	"The Engagement"	James Sheldon	William Bast	October 20, 1974	438221
20	7	"The Candy Drive"	Marc Daniels	Hindi Brooks	October 27, 1974	438231
21	8	"The Winning Season"	Alexander Singer	Jim McGinn	November 10, 1974	438232
22	9	"The Flag"	David Moessinger	Joseph Bonaduce	November 17, 1974	438235
23	10	"The Real Thanksgiving"	Jack Shea	Joseph Bonaduce, Worley Thorne	November 24, 1974	438245
24	11	"The Apprentice"	David Moessinger	Gene Thompson	December 1, 1974	438224
25	12	"The Outsider"	Ivan Dixon	Joseph Bonaduce	December 15, 1974	438211
26	13	"The Christmas Party"	Richard C. Bennett	Lan O'Kun	December 22, 1974	438226
27	14	"The Outing"	Edward M. Abroms	S : Richard Fielder; S/T : Worley Thorne	January 5, 1975	438206
28	15	"The Price"	David Moessinger	Unknown	January 12, 1975	438234

== Syndication ==
Both TV Land and AmericanLife TV aired the series in reruns during the late 1990s and early 2000s.

Two decades after this series left the air, lead actors Ronny Cox and Frances Lee McCain were reunited in the short lived 1993–1994 television prime time soap Second Chances.
