= Tarzan and the Amazons =

1945 film by Kurt Neumann

- Film poster
- Directed by: Kurt Neumann
- Screenplay by: John Jacoby; Marjorie L. Pfaelzer based on characters created by Edgar Rice Burroughs
- Based on: based on characters created by Edgar Rice Burroughs
- Produced by: Sol Lesser; Kurt Neumann
- Starring: Johnny Weissmuller; Brenda Joyce; Johnny Sheffield; Henry Stephenson; Maria Ouspenskaya
- Cinematography: Archie Stout
- Edited by: Robert Crandall
- Music by: Paul Sawtell
- Production company: Champion Productions
- Distributed by: RKO Radio Pictures
- Release date: April 29, 1945
- Running time: 76 minutes
- Language: English

Tarzan and the Amazons a 1945 American adventure film starring Johnny Weissmuller in his ninth outing as Tarzan. Brenda Joyce plays Jane, in the first of her five appearances in the role, and Johnny Sheffield makes his sixth appearance as Boy. Henry Stephenson and Maria Ouspenskaya co-star.

The film was produced by Sol Lesser and Kurt Neumann, written by John Jacoby and Marjorie L. Pfaelzer (based on characters created by Edgar Rice Burroughs) and directed by Kurt Neumann. It was released on April 29, 1945.

== Plot summary ==
Tarzan and Boy, on their way to meet Jane, who is returning from nursing work in Britain to support the war effort, rescue an "Amazon" woman from an attack by a black panther. During the attack, she drops a golden bracelet which Cheeta picks up. The Amazon woman's ankle is twisted in the incident and she cannot walk. Telling Boy to wait for him, Tarzan carries the woman through a mountain pass to the valley where her city of Palmyria is located. Boy disobeys Tarzan, follows them at a distance, and discovers the location of the city, then returns to wait for Tarzan.

After they reunite with Jane, a group of explorers, led by Sir Guy Henderson, discover the bracelet Cheeta has, and its markings are matched to other relics supposedly from a lost city of Amazons. The explorers attempt to enlist Tarzan to lead them to Palmyria. Tarzan refuses, but Boy, believing he is aiding the advancement of science, is duped into guiding them there.

Boy and the party are captured by the Amazons, and their queen declares that in lieu of the death penalty for invading their city, they will all be forced to work the rest of their lives in the Palmyrian quarries with the other men they keep for labor. The woman Tarzan saved from the panther takes pity and releases them. The group, led by Ballister (Henderson's second-in-command) and Anders, then sets about looting the city's treasure vaults. When Henderson objects, Ballister kills him, then fatally knifes the woman who released them. She is able to sound an alarm before she dies, and the invaders are all killed save Ballister and Anders, who escape with two pieces of treasure.

Boy is recaptured and condemned to die. Cheeta warns Tarzan of Boy's impending doom. Tarzan races to Palmyria, meets Ballister and Anders, and backs them into a mud bog in which they sink and die. He returns the Amazons' treasure in exchange for Boy's freedom.

== Cast ==
- Johnny Weissmuller as Tarzan
- Brenda Joyce as Jane
- Johnny Sheffield as Boy
- Henry Stephenson as Sir Guy Henderson, well-meaning explorer
- Maria Ouspenskaya as Amazon Queen
- Barton MacLane as Ballister, villainous member of Henderson's party
- Don Douglas as Anders
- Steven Geray as Brenner
- J. M. Kerrigan as Splivens
- Shirley O'Hara as Athena

== Production notes ==
- Maureen O'Sullivan had played Jane in Weissmuller's first six Tarzan films, then quit the role. Jane was not shown in the next two Tarzan films, which were made while America was involved in World War II, and the explanation for her absence was that she was doing war work in Britain. O'Sullivan appeared interested when producer Sol Lesser tried to lure her back for Tarzan and the Amazons, and the studio announced her return. But she changed her mind and the part was finally recast, going to Brenda Joyce.
- Brenda Joyce portrayed Jane in five Tarzan films, four opposite Johnny Weissmuller and one opposite Lex Barker.
- Henry Stephenson, who played Sir Guy Henderson in "Tarzan and the Amazons", had previously played a different aristocratic Englishman in Tarzan Finds a Son! (1939). Barton MacLane, who played the villain Ballister in this film, went on to play a different villain in the series' next entry, "Tarzan and the Huntress".
- From this film onwards, Tarzan's home was no longer on top of the remote, fictional Mutia Escarpment, but seemingly just up river from the nearest trading post. The change was not explained or alluded to in the story, although one possible reason might have been to draw attention away from the ever-sought-after elephants' graveyard.
- This adventure film was shot in Baldwin Park, Los Angeles County Arboretum and Botanic Garden and Lone Pine, California.

== Critical reception ==
Writing in DVD Talk, critic Paul Mavis described the film as a "terrific, pulpy entry in the Tarzan series" and that director "Neumann does keep the ball rolling at a good clip," but noted that the film was limited by its low budget and "there's almost zero sexual chemistry between the two stars." A contemporary review in The Film Daily described the film as a "pleasing addition to the jungle series" with "sufficient variety to whet the satisfaction of young and old alike."
