= David P. Harmon =

American film producer

- Born: September 3, 1918; Buffalo, New York, US
- Died: August 28, 2001 (aged 82); Los Angeles, California, US
- Occupation(s): Producer, Scriptwriter

David P. Harmon (September 3, 1918 in Buffalo – August 28, 2001 in Los Angeles) was an American scenarist and producer.

== Biography ==
Wife: Ruth Dubin Harmon; b. 1918; d. 1987

== Filmography ==
=== Films ===
Year	Film	Credit	Notes
1956	Johnny Concho	Story By, Screenplay By	Co-Wrote Screenplay with "Don McGuire"
1956	Reprisal!	Screenplay By	Co-Wrote Screenplay with "Raphael Hayes" and "David Dortort"
1957	Rock All Night	Story By	
1957	The Shadow on the Window	Screenplay By	Co-Wrote Screenplay with "Leo Townsend"
1958	The Big Beat	Written By	
1958	The Last of the Fast Guns	Written By	
1962	The Wonderful World of the Brothers Grimm	Story By, Screenplay By	
1964	L'Intrigo	Written By	Co-Wrote Screenplay with "Massimo D'Avak" and "Doris Hume Kilburn"
1968	Call to Danger	Written By	
1969	Honeymoon with a Stranger	Written By	Co-Wrote Screenplay with "Henry Slesar"
1972	Killer by Night	Written By	
1975	Murder on Flight 502	Written By	
1978	Rescue from Gilligan's Island	Screenplay By	Co-Wrote Screenplay with "Sherwood Schwartz", "Elroy Schwartz", and "Al Schwartz"
1981	The Harlem Globetrotters on Gilligan's Island	Screenplay By	Co-Wrote Screenplay with "Sherwood Schwartz", "Al Schwartz", and "Gordon Mitchell"
1991	When It Was a Game	Producer	Documentary
1992	When It Was a Game 2	Producer	Documentary

=== Television ===
Year	TV Series	Credit	Notes
1953–54	Danger	Writer	3 Episodes
1955	Studio One	Writer	1 Episode
1955	The Man Behind the Badge	Writer	12 Episodes
1955	Casablanca	Writer	1 Episode
1955-57	The Jane Wyman Show	Writer	10 Episodes
1955-57	Studio 57	Writer	7 Episodes
1957	West Point	Writer	2 Episodes
1957–58	Schlitz Playhouse of Stars	Writer	4 Episodes
1958	M Squad	Writer	1 Episode
1958–60	Man with a Camera	Writer	4 Episodes
1959	Law of the Plainsman	Writer	1 Episode
1959	Markham	Writer	1 Episode
1959	Special Agent 7	Writer	1 Episode
1959	The Man And The Challenge	Writer	1 Episode
1959	The Troubleshooters	Writer	1 Episode
1959	Wichita Town	Writer	1 Episode
1959–61	The Magical World Of Disney	Writer	4 Episodes
1960	The DuPont Show with June Allyson	Writer	1 Episode
1960	Mr. Lucky	Writer	3 Episodes
1960	Shirley Temple's Storybook	Writer	1 Episode
1960–61	The Detectives	Writer	3 Episodes
1961	The Aquanauts	Writer	6 Episodes
1961	The Barbara Stanwyck Show	Writer	1 Episode
1961–65	Dr. Kildare	Writer	2 Episodes
1962	Follow The Sun	Writer	1 Episode
1962	King of Diamonds	Writer	1 Episode
1962	Ripcord	Writer	1 Episode
1962	The Rifleman	Writer	2 Episodes
1962	Tales of Wells Fargo	Writer	2 Episodes
1962	The Untouchables	Writer	1 Episode
1963	35th Academy Awards	Writer	
1964	Mr. Novak	Writer	1 Episode
1964–65	Valentine's Day	Writer	2 Episodes
1965	Burke's Law	Writer	1 Episode
1965–67	Gilligan's Island	Writer, Story Consultant, Script Consultant	34 Episodes
1966–67	It's About Time	Writer	2 Episodes
1967	Mr. Terrific	Writer	1 Episode
1967–68	Star Trek	Writer	2 Episodes
1968	Premiere	Writer	1 Episode
1968–69	Hawaii Five-O	Writer	2 Episodes
1969	It Takes A Thief	Writer	1 Episode
1969	The Name Of The Game	Writer	2 Episodes
1970	McCloud	Writer	1 Episode
1970	The Mod Squad	Writer	1 Episode
1970	The Virginian	Writer	1 Episode
1970–72	The Brady Bunch	Writer	6 Episodes
1971	Love, American Style	Writer	
1972	The Rookies	Writer	1 Episode
1972	The Sixth Sense	Writer	1 Episode
1972–74	Mannix	Writer	3 Episodes
1972–75	Ironside	Writer	4 Episodes
1973	The Brian Keith Show	Writer	1 Episode
1973	The New Perry Mason	Writer	1 Episode
1973	Dusty's Trail	Writer	1 Episode
1973	Inch High, Private Eye	Writer	
1974	All in the Family	Writer	1 Episode
1974	Star Trek: The Animated Series	Writer	1 Episode
1975	Archer	Writer	1 Episode
1975	Harry O	Writer	1 Episode
1975	Movin' On	Writer	3 Episodes
1975	S.W.A.T.	Writer	1 Episode
1975–77	Starsky & Hutch	Writer	2 Episodes
1976	Big John, Little John	Writer	1 Episode
1977	Nashville 99	Story Consultant	2 Episodes
1977	Young Dan'l Boone	Writer, Story Consultant	1 Episode
1979	The Paper Chase	Writer	2 Episodes
1979–81	Vega$	Writer	3 Episodes
1980	Barnaby Jones	Writer	1 Episode
1981	The Misadventures of Sheriff Lobo	Writer	1 Episode
1981	Harper Valley PTA	Writer, Executive Script Consultant, Executive Story Consultant	6 Episodes
1984	Hotel	Writer	2 Episodes
