= Barry Oringer =

American producer and screenwriter

- Born: December 3, 1935; New York, U.S.
- Died: January 10, 2021 (aged 85); Novato, California, U.S.
- Education: Brooklyn College
- Occupations: Producer, screenwriter
- Spouse: Janine Oringer
- Children: 2

Barry Oringer (December 3, 1935 – January 10, 2021) was an American producer and screenwriter. He was known for writing the pilot episode of the American soap opera television series Hotel with John Furia Jr.

== Life and career ==
Born in New York, Oringer was raised in a Jewish family. He attended Brooklyn College, where he earned a Bachelor of Arts degree in drama and English.

Oringer began his career in 1962, when he wrote the English script for Curtis Bernhardt's film Damon and Pythias. He then wrote for television programs including The Invaders, Mannix, The Fugitive, Ben Casey, Barnaby Jones, The F.B.I., Lancer, I Spy and The Virginian.

Barry Oringer died in January 2021, of Lewy body disease at his home in Novato, California, at the age of 85. He was buried in Bolinas Cemetery.
