= Shimon Wincelberg =

Television writer

- Born: 26 September 1924; Kiel, Germany
- Died: 29 September 2004 (aged 80); Los Angeles
- Occupations: Television script writer, Playwright, Short story writer
- Spouse: Anita Wincelberg
- Writing career
- Pen name: Simon Wincelberg; Simon Winvelberg; S. Bar-David; Shimon Bar-David

Shimon Wincelberg (26 September 1924 – 29 September 2004) was a television writer and Broadway playwright. He wrote the 1959 Broadway play Kataki starring Sessue Hayakawa and Ben Piazza.

== Early life ==
Wincelberg was born to Jewish parents from Poland in Kiel, Germany. His family fled Nazi Germany, arriving in the United States in 1938.

== Career ==
Wincelberg began his career as a writer in 1953 when he sold his first short story. He continued to write stories for a variety of publications including Harper's Bazaar, The New Yorker, and Punch. He wrote many plays, including the Broadway play Kataki, which was based on his own experience in Army intelligence during World War II. He wrote another play in 1962 called Windows of Heaven which premiered at Stockholm's Royal Dramatic Theater. He also wrote books, some with his wife Anita, who was also a writer. He also wrote many television shows during the 1960s and 1970s, often using pseudonyms such as "Simon Wincelberg", "Simon Winvelberg", "S. Bar-David", and "Shimon Bar-David", meaning "Shimon son of David" in Hebrew.

== Jewish identity ==
Wincelberg was a mentor for Orthodox Jews working in Hollywood. His scripts often included Jewish themes, and depicted Jewish rituals and Jewish religious law with accuracy.

== Filmography ==
He wrote or co-wrote over 100 scripts for episodes of the following television series:

=== Films ===
Year	Film	Credit	Notes
1953	Fighter Attack	Written By	
1956	On the Threshold of Space	Written By	Co-Wrote screenplay with "Francis Cockrell"
1961	Der Feind	Written By	Television Movie
1967	Kataki: Der Feind	Story By	Based on the play
1970	Cold Sweat	Screenplay By	Based on the novel "Ride the Nightmare" by "Richard Matheson"
1980	Farewell to the Planet of the Apes	Written By	Television Movie
1996	Pepolino und der Schatz der Meerjungfrau	Screenplay By	Based on the book By "Irene Rodrian", Co-Wrote screenplay with "József Nepp" and "Irene Rodrian"

=== Television ===
Year	TV Series	Credit	Notes
1953	Fireside Theatre	Writer	1 Episode
1954	Medallion Theatre	Writer	1 Episode
1958	Kraft Television Theatre	Writer	1 Episode
1958–63	Have Gun - Will Travel	Writer, Actor	24 Episodes
1959	The Rebel	Writer	1 Episode
1960	Johnny Staccato	Writer	1 Episode
1960	Shirley Temple's Storybook	Writer	1 Episode
1961	The Tall Man	Writer	1 Episode
1961	Target: The Corruptors!	Writer	1 Episode
1961–63	Naked City	Writer	6 Episodes
1962	Frontier Circus	Writer	2 Episodes
1962	General Electric Theater	Writer	1 Episode
1962	The Law and Mr. Jones	Writer	1 Episode
1962	87th Precinct	Writer	1 Episode
1962–63	The Lloyd Bridges Show	Writer	2 Episodes
1963	Rawhide	Writer	1 Episode
1963	Route 66	Writer	2 Episodes
1963	Sam Benedict	Writer	1 Episode
1963–64	The Travels of Jaimie McPheeters	Writer	4 Episodes
1964	Breaking Point	Writer	1 Episode
1964	Channing	Writer	1 Episode
1964–74	Gunsmoke	Writer	4 Episodes
1965	Lost in Space	Writer	7 Episodes
1965	Voyage to the Bottom Of the Sea	Writer	1 Episode
1966	Combat!	Writer	1 Episode
1966	T.H.E. Cat	Writer	1 Episode
1966	The Time Tunnel	Writer	1 Episode
1966-67	Star Trek	Writer	2 Episodes, as well as a script for the aborted 1977 Star Trek: Phase II series
1966-67	The Wild Wild West	Writer	2 Episodes
1967	Custer	Writer	4 Episodes
1968	Garrison's Gorillas	Writer	1 Episode
1969	The Name of the Game	Writer	1 Episode
1969–70	Medical Center	Writer	5 Episodes
1969–75	Mannix	Writer	6 Episodes
1970	The Immortal	Writer	2 Episodes
1971	The Most Deadly Game	Writer	1 Episode
1971	Nichols	Writer	3 Episodes
1972	Longstreet	Writer	1 Episode
1972	Owen Marshall, Counselor at Law	Writer	1 Episode
1972–73	Hec Ramsey	Writer	2 Episodes
1973	The Magician	Writer	1 Episode
1973	The Starlost	Writer	1 Episode
1974	Devlin	Writer	
1974	The New Perry Mason	Writer	1 Episode
1974	Planet of the Apes	Writer	1 Episode
1975	Bronk	Writer	1 Episode
1975–76	Police Woman	Writer	5 Episodes
1977	Logan's Run	Writer	1 Episode
1977	Serpico	Writer	1 Episode
1978	Man from Atlantis	Writer	1 Episode
1979	Supertrain	Writer	1 Episode
1979	The Paper Chase	Writer	1 Episode
1979	Trapper John, M.D.	Writer	2 Episodes
1980	Hagen	Writer	
1982	Dynasty	Writer	3 Episodes
1987	Mariah	Writer	1 Episode
1997	Law & Order	Writer	1 Episode

== Death ==
Wincelberg died on 19 September 2004 of an undisclosed illness in a nursing home in Los Angeles at the age of 80.
