= Don McDougall (director) =

American television director

- Born: Donald McDougall; September 28, 1917; San Francisco, California
- Died: February 7, 1991 (aged 73); California
- Occupation: Television director / screenwriter
- Years active: 1951–91

Don McDougall (born September 28, 1917 – February 7, 1991) was an American television director and screenwriter.

McDougall directed numerous episodes of television shows including Wanted: Dead or Alive, Rawhide, Bonanza, Mannix, Ironside, Star Trek: The Original Series, The Six Million Dollar Man, and CHiPs. He also directed for shows such as The Rifleman, Mission: Impossible. Dallas, Kolchak: The Night Stalker, The Dukes of Hazzard, and Wonder Woman. In 1974, he directed three episodes of Planet of the Apes that featured Mark Lenard and were photographed by Jerry Finnerman.

McDougall directed the three main stars of Star Trek in non-Star Trek productions. He directed Leonard Nimoy in a 1965 episode of The Virginian and directed William Shatner in two episodes of the NBC series Barbary Coast in 1975. It is DeForest Kelley with whom he worked the most, having worked with the actor numerous times in the late 1950s. He directed Kelley in several episodes of the CBS western series Trackdown, as well as a 1957 episode of Alcoa Theatre, a 1958 episode of Bonanza, and a 1959 episode of Wanted: Dead or Alive. Other regular Trek actors he directed include Diana Muldaur (in an episode of Mannix) and Michael Dorn (on CHiPs).

McDougall died in Los Angeles on February 7, 1991.
