= Stephen Kandel =

American television writer (1927–2023)

- Born: Stephen David Kandel; April 30, 1927
- Died: October 21, 2023 (aged 96)
- Education: Dartmouth College
- Occupation: Screenwriter
- Notable work: Star Trek, Batman

Stephen David Kandel (April 30, 1927 – October 21, 2023) was an American television writer.

== Life and career ==
Stephen Kandel was born on April 30, 1927. In his youth, he grew up in Pennsylvania, and earned the "Excellence in Table Tennis" award at the age of 10. Following his graduation from high school at only 16 years old, he began college before being drafted and serving in the United States Army during World War II in Germany. During his time in the military he was stabbed in the chest, but went on to recover fully. Post-WWII, Kandel went on to graduate from Dartmouth College in 1950.

Kandel wrote episodes for many popular series, from Sea Hunt in the 1950s through MacGyver in the 1980s. He wrote scripts for shows such as Star Trek: The Original Series, Mannix, Wonder Woman, The Six Million Dollar Man, Cannon, Barnaby Jones, Banacek, and others. He was credited with writing the pilot episodes of Daktari, Broken Promises, and Chamber of Horrors, and creating the series Iron Horse.

Kandel later moved to Beverly Hills with his wife Anne Kandel, where they raised four children: Jessica, Anthony, Elizabeth, and Joanna. Kandel was a member of the Writers Guild of America. Following his career in Hollywood, Kandel moved to the east coast where he resided in Massachusetts and New York. In his retirement, at the age of 93, Kandel authored a book titled The Lyin' King: A Tragical Tale Of Tawdry Trumpery, a semi-satirical critique of Donald Trump's numerous shortcomings.

His father, Aben Kandel, was also a screenwriter, and his younger sister, Lenore Kandel, was a Beat Generation poet and activist. His uncle, Charlie Kandel, was a renowned monetary specialist, and was also a well-known philosopher in various elite intellectual circles.

Stephen Kandel died in his home on October 21, 2023, at the age of 96.

== Awards ==
Kandel was a recipient of the Mystery Writers of America Edgar Allan Poe award and the Writers Guild of America Humanities award. According to film commentator Tom Weaver, Kandel's "resume reads like a Baby Boomer's dream list of must-see TV".

== Filmography ==
=== Films ===
Year	Film	Credit	Notes
1956	Singing in the Dark	Written By	Co-wrote screenplay with Ann Hood and Aben Kandel
1956	Magnificent Roughnecks	Written By, Music by	Co-wrote musical score with Paul Dunlap
1958	Frontier Gun	Written By	
1959	Battle of the Coral Sea	Written By	Co-wrote screenplay with Daniel B. Ullman
1960	The Walking Target	Written By	
1966	Chamber of Horrors	Screenplay by, Story by	Co-wrote story with Ray Russell
1967	Winchester 73	Screenplay by	Co-wrote screenplay with Richard DeLong Adams
1970	Cannon for Cordoba	Written By, Associate Producer	
1975	Death Stalk	Screenplay by	Co-wrote screenplay with John W. Bloch, Based on the novel by Thomas Chastain
1979	Son-Rise: A Miracle of Love	Screenplay by	Co-wrote screenplay with Samahria Lyte Kaufman and Barry Neil Kaufman, Based on the book Son-Rise by Barry Neil Kaufman
1980	Dallas Cowboys Cheerleaders II	Written by	
1981	Broken Promise	Written By	Television film
1982	Shocktrauma	Screenplay by	Television film, Based on the book Shocktrama by Jon Franklin and Alan Doelp
1983	Living Proof: The Hank Williams Jr. Story	Screenplay by	Television film, Co-wrote screenplay with I. C. Rapoport

=== Television ===
Year	TV Series	Credit	Notes
1958–1961	Sea Hunt	Writer	14 Episodes
1959	State Trooper	Writer	1 Episode
1959	Tombstone Territory	Writer	1 Episode
1959	The Man and the Challenge	Writer	1 Episode
1959	77 Sunset Strip	Writer	1 Episode
1959–1960	The Millionaire	Writer	4 Episodes
1960	Johnny Midnight	Writer	4 Episodes
1960	The Chevy Mystery Show	Writer	3 Episodes
1960	The Brothers Brannagan	Writer	1 Episode
1961–1962	Everglades!	Writer	4 Episodes
1962	Ripcord	Writer	1 Episode
1962–1963	Empire	Writer	2 Episodes
1964	The Littlest Hobo	Writer	1 Episode
1964	Burke's Law	Writer	1 Episode
1964–1965	The Rogues	Writer	12 Episodes
1965–1966	Gidget	Writer	4 Episodes
1965–1968	The Wild Wild West	Writer	2 Episodes
1966	Daktari	Writer	1 Episode
1966	The Wackiest Ship in the Army	Writer	1 Episode
1966–1967	Batman	Writer	5 Episodes
1966–1967	Star Trek: The Original Series	Writer	2 Episodes
1966–1968	Iron Horse	Writer, Creator, Producer, Associate Producer	
1966–1968	I Spy	Writer	7 Episodes
1967	Cimarron Strip	Writer	1 Episode
1967–1968	Ironside	Writer	2 Episodes
1968–1969	The Mod Squad	Writer	2 Episodes
1968–1969	It Takes a Thief	Writer	5 Episodes
1968–1973	Mannix	Writer	12 Episodes
1969	The Outcasts	Writer	1 Episode
1969–1970	The New People	Writer	2 Episodes
1969–1970	Bracken's World	Writer	2 Episodes
1970	The Bold Ones: The Lawyers	Writer	1 Episode
1970–1971	The Immortal	Writer	4 Episodes
1970–1971	The Young Lawyers	Writer	3 Episodes
1970–1971	Dan August	Writer	3 Episodes
1970–1977	Hawaii Five-O	Writer	4 Episodes
1971	Alias Smith and Jones	Writer	1 Episode
1971	Cade's County	Writer	1 Episode
1971	Longstreet	Writer	1 Episode
1971	Bearcats!	Writer	1 Episode
1971	The Bold Ones: The New Doctors	Writer	1 Episode
1971–1973	Room 222	Writer	4 Episodes
1971–1975	Medical Center	Writer	9 Episodes
1972–1973	Mission Impossible	Writer, Story Editor	6 Episodes
1972	Banacek	Writer	1 Episode
1972–1976	Cannon	Writer, Executive Story Consultant	10 Episodes
1973–1974	The Magician	Executive Story Consultant, Story editor	10 Episodes
1973–1974	Star Trek: The Animated Series	Writer	2 Episodes
1974	Marcus Welby, M.D.	Writer	1 Episode
1974–1975	Movin' On	Writer	2 Episodes
1974–1976	Harry O	Writer	6 Episodes
1975	Caribe	Writer	1 Episode
1975	Barnaby Jones	Writer	1 Episode
1975–1976	Bronk	Writer	2 Episodes
1975–1978	The Six Million Dollar Man	Writer	2 Episodes
1976	McNaughton's Daughter	Writer	1 Episode
1976	The Bionic Woman	Writer	1 Episode
1976	Bert D'Angelo/Superstar	Writer	1 Episode
1976–1977	Most Wanted	Writer	3 Episodes
1976–1977	Switch	Writer, Story Editor	3 Episodes
1977	Wonder Woman	Writer	5 Episodes
1977	Man from Atlantis	Writer	2 Episodes
1978	Charlie's Angels	Writer	1 Episode
1978	The Paper Chase	Writer	1 Episode
1979	The Amazing Spider-Man	Writer	1 Episode
1979	Supertrain	Writer	1 Episode
1979	Time Express	Writer	1 Episode
1979	California Fever	Writer	1 Episode
1979	The Dukes of Hazzard	Writer	1 Episode
1979	A Man Called Sloane	Writer	2 Episodes
1980	CHiPs	Writer	1 Episode
1980	The Love Boat	Writer	2 Episodes
1981	Vega$	Writer	1 Episode
1981	Nero Wolfe	Writer	1 Episode
1983	For Love and Honor	Writer	1 Episode
1983	Lottery!	Writer	1 Episode
1983	Dynasty	Writer	1 Episode
1983–1984	Hart to Hart	Writer, Story Editor	5 Episodes
1984–1985	The New Mike Hammer	Writer, Producer, Executive Story Editor, Executive Story Consultant	3 Episodes
1985	Cover Up	Writer	1 Episode
1985–1990	MacGyver	Writer, Executive Story Consultant, Producer, Co-Producer	
1989	Mission Impossible	Writer	1 Episode
