= John Llewellyn Moxey =

Argentine-born British film and TV director (1925–2019)

- Born: 26 February 1925; Argentina
- Died: 29 April 2019 (aged 94); University Place, Washington, U.S.
- Occupations: Film director, television director
- Years active: 1955–1991
- Spouse(s): Jane Moxey (1970–2019; 2 children)

John Llewellyn Moxey (26 February 1925 – 29 April 2019) was an Argentine-born British film and television director. He was known for directing the horror film The City of the Dead (also known as Horror Hotel, 1960) and directing episodes of The Saint; Mission: Impossible; Magnum, P.I.; and Murder, She Wrote. He was sometimes credited as John L. Moxey or John Moxey.

== Life and career ==
Moxey was born in Argentina in 1925. His family operated a coal and steel business out of South America at the time. He attended Rose Hill School, Banstead, Ottershaw College, Bradfield College, and the Royal Military College, Sandhurst.

Before entering the film industry, he served in the Second World War in the British Army's 53rd Division Reconnaissance Corps. Beginning his career as an editor, he subsequently went on to direct episodes of the British series London Playhouse and The Adventures of Tugboat Annie.

Moxey's feature film directorial debut was The City of the Dead (also known as Horror Hotel, 1960). He also directed the film Circus of Fear (1966).

For much of his career he focused on directing television, including episodes of the British series Man of the World, The Edgar Wallace Mysteries, Armchair Theatre, The Baron, The Saint, The Avengers and the American series Judd, for the Defense; Hawaii Five-O; Mission: Impossible; Mannix; Kung Fu; Miami Vice; Magnum, P.I.; Murder, She Wrote and the pilot episode of Charlie's Angels. He also directed a number of television films, including A Taste of Evil (1971), Home for the Holidays (1972), The Night Stalker (1972), Genesis II (1973), Where Have All the People Gone? (1974), The Strange and Deadly Occurrence (1974), No Place to Hide (1981), and Desire, the Vampire (1982).
