= Murray Golden =

American television director (1912–1991)

- Born: October 24, 1912; New York City, U.S.
- Died: August 5, 1991 (aged 78); Encino, California, U.S.
- Occupation: Television director

Murray Golden (October 24, 1912 – August 5, 1991) was an American television director. He directed for television programs including The Fugitive, Bonanza, The Rifleman, Mannix, Trapper John, M.D., Rawhide, The Time Tunnel, Burke's Law, Get Smart and Star Trek: The Original Series.

Golden died on August 5, 1991 from complications of a stroke in Encino, California, at the age of 78.

== Filmography ==
=== Television ===
Year	TV Series	Credit	Notes
1956	Kraft Television Theatre	Director	1 Episode
1959	M Squad	Director	1 Episode
1959	The Detectives	Director	
1959-64	Death Valley Days	Director	12 Episodes
1960	The Rifleman	Director	1 Episode
1960	Zane Grey Theatre	Director	1 Episode
1960-61	Wanted: Dead or Alive	Director	10 Episodes
1962	Rawhide	Director	2 Episodes
1963	77 Sunset Strip	Director	1 Episode
1963	The Twilight Zone	Associate Producer	10 Episodes
1963-64	Bonanza	Writer, Director	6 Episodes
1965	The Big Valley	Director	1 Episode
1965	The Wackiest Ship in the Army	Director	1 Episode
1965-66	Burke's Law	Director	5 Episodes
1965-66	Honey West	Director	3 Episodes
1966	Batman	Director	6 Episodes
1966	Get Smart	Director	3 Episodes
1966	The Green Hornet	Director	1 Episode
1966	Jericho	Director	1 Episode
1966	A Man Called Shenandoah	Director	2 Episodes
1966	The Time Tunnel	Director	1 Episode
1966	12 O'Clock High	Director	1 Episode
1966-67	Iron Horse	Director	2 Episodes
1967	The Fugitive	Director	1 Episode
1967	The Invaders	Director	1 Episode
1967	Rango	Director	2 Episodes
1967	Run for Your Life	Director	1 Episode
1967-71	Mannix	Director	5 Episodes
1968-69	The Flying Nun	Director	6 Episodes
1969	Star Trek	Director	1 Episode
1969-71	Mission: Impossible	Director	5 Episodes
1970	Love, American Style	Director	1 Episode
1970-71	Hawaii Five-O	Director	2 Episodes
1970-75	Medical Center	Director	10 Episodes
1971	Bearcats!	Director	1 Episode
1971	The Chicago Teddy Bears	Director	2 Episodes
1973	Insight	Director	1 Episode
1973	The New Perry Mason	Director	2 Episodes
1973	Sigmund and the Sea Monsters	Director	4 Episodes
1974	Apple's Way	Director	2 Episodes
1977	Tabitha	Director	1 Episode
1979-80	Trapper John, M.D.	Director	3 Episodes
1980-81	CBS Children's Mystery Theatre	Director	2 Episodes
