= Paul Krasny =

American director

- Born: August 8, 1935; Cleveland, Ohio, U.S.
- Died: November 12, 2001 (aged 66); Las Vegas, Nevada, U.S.
- Occupation: Director
- Years active: 1964–1994

Paul Krasny (August 8, 1935 – November 12, 2001) was an American film and television director.

Beginning his career in 1964, he amassed many credits in television. Some of his television credits include Hawaii Five-O, Mission: Impossible, Mannix, CHiPs, Quincy, M.E., Hart to Hart, Dallas, Police Squad!, V, Simon & Simon, Crazy Like a Fox, Miami Vice, MacGyver and Moonlighting.

== Filmography ==
- D.A.: Conspiracy to Kill (1971)
- Adventures of Nick Carter (1972)
- The Letters (1973)
- Christina (1974)
- Big Rose: Double Trouble (1974)
- Mobile Medics (1976)
- Joe Panther (1976)
- The Islander (1978)
- When Hell Was in Session (1979)
- Fugitive Family (1980)
- Alcatraz: The Whole Shocking Story (1980)
- Terror Among Us (1981)
- Fly Away Home (1981)
- Catalina C-Lab (1982)
- Time Bomb (1984)
- Still Crazy Like a Fox (1987)
- Kojak: Ariana (1989)
- Kojak: Flowers for Matty (1990)
- Back to Hannibal: The Return of Tom Sawyer and Huckleberry Finn (1990)
- Tagteam (1991)
- Drug Wars: The Cocaine Cartel (1992)
- Two Fathers: Justice for the Innocent (1994)
- Search and Rescue (1994)
