= Iron Horse (TV series) =

American Western television series (1966–1968)

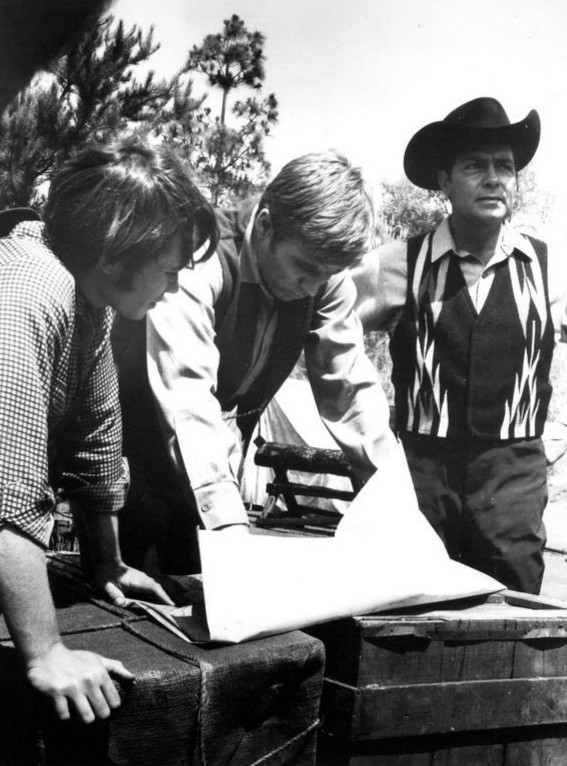
- Cast from left: Bob Random, Gary Collins and Dale Robertson, 1966.
- Genre: Western
- Created by: James Goldstone; Stephen Kandel
- Starring: Dale Robertson; Robert Random; Gary Collins; Roger Torrey; Ellen McRae
- Theme music composer: Dominic Frontiere
- Country of origin: United States
- Original language: English
- No. of seasons: 2
- No. of episodes: 47

Production
- Executive producers: Matthew Rapf; Charles Marquis Warren
- Producers: Fred Freiberger; Stephen Kandel
- Running time: 60 minutes
- Production companies: Dagonet Productions; Screen Gems

Original release
- Network: ABC
- Release: September 12, 1966 – January 6, 1968

Iron Horse is an American Western television series that appeared on ABC from 1966 to 1968 and starred Dale Robertson as fictional gambler-turned-railroad baron Ben Calhoun. Costars included Gary Collins, Robert Random, Roger Torrey, and Ellen Burstyn (who was billed as Ellen McRae). The series pilot was released as the film Scalplock.

== Synopsis ==
The plot centered on Calhoun's poker game-win of the incomplete Buffalo Pass, Scalplock, & Defiance Railroad and his attempts to finish the line despite ever-present obstacles.

A running subplot was Calhoun's frequent and (for TV at that time) flagrant sexual dalliances with his many attractive female guest stars, as well as his steadier on and off arrangement with Julie Parsons, played by Ellen Burstyn. Though he was never shown in bed with any of them, there was little doubt about what was happening between scenes; and marriage was never proposed as a possibility. The second season minimized Calhoun's sexual exploits somewhat, perhaps in response to viewer complaints.

== Cast ==
- Dale Robertson as Ben Calhoun
- Robert Random as Barnabas Rogers
- Gary Collins as Dave Tarrant
- Roger Torrey as Nils Torvald
- Ellen McRae as Julie Parsons

== Production ==
Much of the external footage involving trains was shot on the historic Sierra Railroad in and around Jamestown and Sonora, California.

The filming was produced by Screen Gems.

== Episode list ==
=== Pilot: 1966 ===
| No. overall | No. in season | Title | Directed by | Written by | Original release date |
|---|---|---|---|---|---|
| 0 | 0 | "Scalplock" | James Goldstone | Stephen Kandel & James Goldstone | April 10, 1966 |
Benjamin Calhoun (Dale Robertson) wins a railroad in a card game. Attempts to take the railroad away from him ensue. Guest stars: John Anderson, Lloyd Bochner, David Sheiner, Woodrow Parfrey, and Cliff Hall

=== Season 1: 1966–67 ===
| No. overall | No. in season | Title | Directed by | Written by | Original release date |
|---|---|---|---|---|---|
| 1 | 1 | "A Joy Unconfined" | James Goldstone | Stephen Kandel | September 12, 1966 |
After winning a railroad (Pilot), Calhoun's former partner, Luke Joy (Ihnat), claims the railroad as his. Guest stars: Todd Armstrong, James Doohan, John Anderson, Lloyd Bochner, Sandra Smith, James Westerfield, Woodrow Parfrey, David Sheiner, and Steve Ihnat
| 2 | 2 | "A Dynamite Drive" | Claudio Guzmán | Stephen Kandel | September 19, 1966 |
Calhoun tries to deliver a heard of horses while an opponent tries to stop him. Guest stars: Malachi Throne, Tom Reese, Joel Fluellen, James Hong, Richard Lapp, Jon Kowal, Russ McCubbin, William Kerwin, Paul Sorensen, and Bill Saito
| 3 | 3 | "High Devil" | Samuel Fuller | Samuel Fuller | September 26, 1966 |
A woman demands marriage as payment for her release from a killer. Guest stars: Charles H. Gray, Hardie Albright, Dal Jenkins, George Winters, Fred Dale, G.D. Spradlin, Rex Holman, Louise Sorel, and James Best
| 4 | 4 | "Right of Way Through Paradise" | Richard Benedict | Mort Lewis | October 3, 1966 |
Calhoun hires four former Confederates. They become rowdy and disturb the peace. Guest stars: E.J. André, Walter Maslow, Richard Crane, Harry Lauter, Bill Quinn, Sean McClory, and Hoyt Axton
| 5 | 5 | "The Pride at the Bottom of the Barrel" | Jesse Hibbs | John O'Dea & Arthur Rowe | October 10, 1966 |
Starving Apaches leave their reservation looking for food and encounter a brutal United States Cavalry Commander. Guest stars: Nina Shipman, Jock Gaynor, Richard Gilden, Gene Evans, Victor Jory, and Rod Cameron
| 6 | 6 | "Broken Gun" | Jesse Hibbs | John O'Dea & Arthur Rowe | October 17, 1966 |
An ex-gunslinger is looking for revenge. Guest stars: James Almanzar, Steve Raines, Chuck Webster, Philip Ober, Leigh Chapman, Strother Martin, Robert Lyons, and Kelly Jean Peters
| 7 | 7 | "Cougar Man" | Robert Totten | Robert Sabaroff | October 24, 1966 |
Calhoun has a "fight to the death" with an Apache who killed 5 of his employees. Guest stars: Rodolfo Acosta, Frederic Downs, Don Baker, Donald Chaffin, Henry Darrow, Morgan Woodward, and Richard Hale
| 8 | 8 | "War Cloud" | Joseph Kane | T : Richard & Esther Shapiro; S/T : Richard C. Meyer & Norman T. Herman | October 31, 1966 |
Calhoun escorts a United States Army officer who has captured the Sioux chief to bring him to justice for numerous murders. A man who lost his family is looking for War Cloud and seeks revenge. Guest stars: John M. Pickard, Russ Bender, Abel Fernandez, Richard Anders, Stephen McNally, Milton Selzer, and Marion Thompson
| 9 | 9 | "No Wedding Bells for Tony" | Harmon Jones | Peter Germano | November 7, 1966 |
Calhoun goes to the wedding of a friend only to find no trace of him exists. Guest stars: Susan Browning, Tony Young, Tom Troupe, Fred Dale, Frank Laswell, Warren Vanders, Jeff Morrow, Virginia Field, and David Brian
| 10 | 10 | "The Man from New Chicago" | Samuel Fuller | Mort Lewis | November 14, 1966 |
A man is forced to work in a labor camp. Calhoun must rescue him. Guest stars: Duane Grey, Simon Prescott, Anthony Brand, Jim Shepard, Tom Steele, James Anderson, John Milford, and Madlyn Rhue
| 11 | 11 | "Explosion at Waycrossing" | Murray Golden | Robert Dennis | November 21, 1966 |
When one of Calhoun's trains is robbed, the robber is sentenced to death. Calhoun thinks this it is too harsh of a sentence. Guest stars: John Hoyt, Donald Barry, Billy M. Greene, Wes Buchanan, John Rayborn, Dean Smith, Toian Matchinga, Michael T. Mikler, Tol Avery, Mort Mills, and Burr DeBenning
| 12 | 12 | "Through Ticket to Gunsight" | Herb Wallerstein | Preston Wood | November 28, 1966 |
When a boiler breaks on a train Calhoun owns, he gives the passengers refunds, however, a woman with an inheritance of a mine intends a going further so Dave Tarrant (Collins) goes along with her. Guest stars: Bing Russell, Duane Grey, James Lemp, William Vaughan, Orville Sherman, Ben Gage, K.T. Stevens, Sandra Smith, John M. Pickard, and Rayford Barnes
| 13 | 13 | "Town Full of Fear" | László Benedek | T : John O'Dea & Arthur Rowe; S/T : Robert Hamner | December 5, 1966 |
The last citizen of a ghost town has a secret they would rather stay buried than come to light. Guest stars: Dub Taylor, Michael Fox, Dennis Cross, Antoinette Bower, Richard Evans, Sid Haig, and William Windom
| 14 | 14 | "Big Deal" | Earl Bellamy | Bernard Rothman & Norman Klenman | December 12, 1966 |
While a millionaire and his wife ride one of Calhoun's trains, the millionaire is kidnapped. Guest stars: Woodrow Parfrey, Ted de Corsia, Robert Cornthwaite, Chuck Webster, Dean Smith, Pat Conway, Hazel Court, and Michael Ansara
| 15 | 15 | "A Dozen Ways to Kill a Man" | Herb Wallerstein | T : Peter Germano; S/T : Louis Vittes | December 19, 1966 |
Calhoun's employees are lured away by the promise of gold. Guest stars: William Bramley, Paul Sorensen, Lawrence Mann, Owen Bush, Rush Williams, Dick Shane, Skip Homeier, Ford Rainey and Sheree North
| 16 | 16 | "Hellcat" | Samuel Fuller | Story by : Oliver Crawford; Teleplay by : Samuel Fuller & Oliver Crawford | December 26, 1966 |
Calhoun rescues an Indian woman (Martel) from two Buffalo hunters (Landers and Beck) after they were abusing her. On the way to meet the Sioux chief, Calhoun asks her to be his scout through dangerous terrain. Guest stars: Harry Landers, Vincent Beck, Tony Young, and Arlene Martel
| 17 | 17 | "Welcome for the General" | Alan Crosland Jr. | Sherman Yellen | January 2, 1967 |
A former Confederate officer plans to assassinate General Sherman (Almanzar) by taking everyone hostage. Guest stars: Ed Faulkner, Anna Karen, Wally Strauss, Quentin Sondergaard, Lincoln Tate, Dennis Jones, James Almanzar, Lisabeth Hush, David Macklin, James J. Griffith and Royal Dano
| 18 | 18 | "The Pembrooke Blood" | Herb Wallerstein | Richard & Esther Shapiro | January 9, 1967 |
Pembrooke (Morrison) takes Calhoun hostage then invites him to dinner and a poker game to get released. Calhoun wins, but Pembrooke reneges. As Calhoun escapes, he kills his pursuers. Guest stars: Charles Grodin, Martin Ashe, Bob Morrison, Eddie Little Sky, Tim McIntire, Sharon Farrell, and Bert Freed
| 19 | 19 | "Volcano Wagon" | Samuel Fuller | Ken Trevey | January 16, 1967 |
Nils, another crewman, and a little boy are trapped by a cave-in. While Dave and other crewman are digging them out, Calhoun and Barnabas go to retrieve nitro, but the trip becomes dangerous. Guest stars: Arthur Peterson, Kelton Garwood, Lynn Wood, Tommy Durkin, Donald Briggs. John Hart, Brett Pearson, Richard Sinatra, Dean Harens, and Lane Bradbury
| 20 | 20 | "The Bridge at Forty-Mile" | Herb Wallerstein | Thomas W. Blackburn | January 23, 1967 |
A lumber salesman who sold lumber to Calhoun is missing. His brother refuses to give the sold lumber until bill of sale is confirmed. Tarrant sets out to find the salesman and two recently renegade Indians who quit at the lumber yard. Guest stars: Clint Kimbrough, James Antonio, Eddie Little Sky, X Brands, Robert Cabal, Donald Chaffin, Katherine Justice, Elena Verdugo, Richard X. Slattery, and Douglas Kennedy
| 21 | 21 | "Shadow Run" | Paul Henreid | Peter Germano | January 30, 1967 |
Calhoun is forced to shoot a man while in town. The man is hired to kill Calhoun. Guest stars: Sherry O'Neil, Robert Yuro, Gene Dynarski, Stewart Bradley, Martin Ashe, Ivan Bonar, Renny McEvoy, Frank Marth, Richard Devon, and Mary Ann Mobley
| 22 | 22 | "Banner with a Strange Device" | Samuel Fuller | John O'Dea & Arthur Rowe | February 6, 1967 |
While Calhoun is making a business transaction in Banner with Big Jim Banner (York), Barnabas (Random) is attacked by Banner's son (Pollock) who mistakes for Jeff Claiborne (Random). Guest stars: Tony Young, Robert Williams, Charles Horvath, Dean Smith, Jeff York, Dean Pollock, Anthony Zerbe, Jorja Curtright, and Brenda Benet
| 23 | 23 | "Appointment with an Epitaph" | Herbert Hirschman | Harold Livingston | February 13, 1967 |
Six people who board the train fear for their lives after a notorious gunman boards as well. Guest stars: Lew Gallo, Susan Howard, Ron Hagerthy, Martin Ashe, Austin E. Roberts, Gloria Grahame, Robert Emhardt, Bill Bixby, and John Ireland
| 24 | 24 | "The Red Tornado" | Samuel Fuller | Warren Douglas | February 20, 1967 |
After a battle with the Shoshone, Calhoun finds an eight year Arapaho boy alive. The boy is heir to the killed Arapaho chief. Guest stars: Tony Davis, Jock Gaynor, Blaisdell Makee, Anna Karen, Martin Ashe, Walter Mathews, Snag Werris, and Michael Rennie
| 25 | 25 | "Decision at Sundown" | Herb Wallerstein | Stephen Kandel | February 27, 1967 |
A group of ruthless outlaws take of the train while Calhoun is away. Guest stars: Celia Kaye, Gus Trikonis, Sam Reese, John Stephenson, Helen Kleeb, Mickey Morton, Joan Huntington, Victor French, and Russ Tamblyn
| 26 | 26 | "The Passenger" | William J. Hole Jr. | Irving Cummings & Charles Marion | March 6, 1967 |
While under orders from President Grant to escort Pierre Le Druc (Richman), a Mexican general is also pursuing the train to capture Le Druc. Guest stars: Steve Gravers, Martin Ashe, Ruben Moreno, Carl Milletaire, Bert Santos, Val Avery, Mark Richman, Linda Cristal, and Alejandro Rey
| 27 | 27 | "The Execution" | Herbert Hirschman | Ken Kolb | March 13, 1967 |
Calhoun's railroad is given the contract to haul for a mining company which effectively owner of the old coach freight line out of business. Guest stars: Joseph Perry, Bart Burns, Anne Bellamy, Michael Witney, Paul Brinegar, Julie Gregg, and Noam Pitlik
| 28 | 28 | "Death by Triangulation" | Otto Lang | Louis Vittes | March 20, 1967 |
When Calhoun wins a poker game against outlaw gambler Dan Patrick, Patrick does not have the money on him. He offers a young Spanish woman as collateral until Patrick can give the money to Calhoun. Guest stars: Louis De Cordova, William Fawcett, Buck Holland, Jay Alexander, Kit Carson, Allison Hayes, Monte Markham, Gigi Perreau, Christopher Dark, and George Murdock
| 29 | 29 | "The Golden Web" | Herb Wallerstein | Stephen Kandel | March 27, 1967 |
While Calhoun is forced into a business transaction with conman Preston Webb (Mohr), Webb joins up with a grifter (Barry) who wants to sell a machine that will find gold. Guest stars: Stanley Clements, Herb Ellis, Clark Race, Booth Colman, Mitzi Hoag, Joey Giambra, Woodrow Parfrey, Patricia Barry, David Sheiner, and Gerald Mohr
| 30 | 30 | "Sister Death" | Herbert Hirschman | Mann Rubin | April 3, 1967 |
While transporting three women to Kansas City, Calhoun finds out one of the women is a witness to a mob boss where she is to testify against him. Guest stars: Lurene Tuttle, Rita D'Amico, James Hong, Don Keefer, John Alderman, Hal Baylor, Martin Ashe, Norman Rambo, Sandy Kevin, Richard Crane, Paul Bryar, Dean Smith, Roy Sickner, Bridget Hanley, Mark Lenard and Barbara Stuart

=== Season 2: 1967–68 ===
| No. overall | No. in season | Title | Directed by | Written by | Original release date |
|---|---|---|---|---|---|
| 31 | 1 | "Diablo" | Herb Wallerstein | Jeri Emmett & Terence Maples | September 16, 1967 |
The people of Scalplock are being frauded with horse racing which could destroy Calhoun's good reputation. Guest stars: Forrest Lewis, Kay Kuter, James Nolan, Harry Raybould, Vinton Hayworth, Jack Fife, Lloyd Gough, Martin Brooks, and Strother Martin
| 32 | 2 | "Consignment: Betsy the Boiler" | Richard C. Sarafian | Bob Duncan & Wanda Duncan | September 23, 1967 |
Calhoun outbids an old nemesis (Constantine) on a boiler. After Tarrant is kidnapped at gunpoint, he finds himself sympathetic to the townspeople who need the boiler. Guest stars: Walter Sande, John Hoyt, Michael Greene, Charles Irving, Sandy Kevin, Kevin Schultz, Linda Marsh, Warren Vanders, Paul Lambert, and Michael Constantine
| 33 | 3 | "Gallows for Billy Pardew" | Gene Nelson | Bob Duncan & Wanda Duncan | September 30, 1967 |
Rogers accuses Billy Pardew (Heaton) as the killer of a store clerk on the basis of Pardew's boots. Calhoun is ordered by a judge (Corey) to defend him when no other lawyer will. Guest stars: Russ Conway, Arthur Space, Bill Zuckert, John Marley, Jeff Corey, David Lewis, and Tom Heaton
| 34 | 4 | "Five Days to Washtiba" | Lazlo Benedek | Milton S. Gelman | October 7, 1967 |
Calhoun allows a band of Indians to cross the railroad which angers the townspeople. Guest stars: Charles Maxwell, Lane Bradford, Blaisdel Makee), Cynthia Hull, Kit Carson, Louise Troy, Richard Hale, and John Anderson
| 35 | 5 | "The Silver Bullet" | Anton Leader | Oliver Crawford | October 14, 1967 |
Tarrant is uneasy about giving up a location of a man that a bounty hunter (Ihnat) is looking for because he promised a woman he would not reveal his location. Guest stars: Peter Haskell, Ken Lynch, Ellen Madison, Nate Esformes, Don Pedro Colley, and Steve Ihnat
| 36 | 6 | "Grapes of Grass Valley" | Paul Henreid | Stanley Adams & George F. Slavin | October 21, 1967 |
Calhoun wants to help French monks, but his friends don't want them there. Guest stars: Chuck Hicks, Charles Horvath, Mercedes Alberti, John Mitchum, Michael Abelar, Victor Millan, Lonny Chapman, Marie Gomez, Laurie Main, and Emile Genest
| 37 | 7 | "Leopards Try, But Leopards Can't" | Leo Penn | Jeri Emmett & Norman Katkov | October 28, 1967 |
A bounty hunter (Hackman) comes to town and takes interest in Julie Parsons (McRae). Guest stars: Roy Barcroft, Forrest Lewis, Jonathan Harper, Midge Ware, Chuck Hicks, Sam Melville, and Gene Hackman
| 38 | 8 | "The Return of Hode Avery" | Gene Nelson | Harry Kronman | November 4, 1967 |
Hode Avery (Oates) arrives in town while Clay Hennings (Healey) is upset. Guest stars: Russ Conway, Sid Haig, Dal McKennon, Myron Healey, Susan Howard, and Warren Oates
| 39 | 9 | "Four Guns to Scalplock" | Murray Golden | Robert Leslie Bellem | November 11, 1967 |
Four members of an outlaw gang board the train while Calhoun does not let them know he knows of them. Guest stars: Warren Stevens, Joan Hotchkis, Simon Scott, Stanley Beck, Lawrence Montaigne, and Harry Lauter
| 40 | 10 | "Steel Chain to a Music Box" | Charles R. Rondeau | Herman Groves | November 18, 1967 |
Frank Wyatt (Petersen) is accidentally shot in a fight with Rogers. Calhoun wants to take the young man to a doctor, however, his father (Stone) has other plans. Guest stars: James Wainwright, Tom Baker, Phil Chambers, Shug Fisher, Ken Mayer, Noah Keen, Anna Capri, Harold J. Stone and Paul Petersen
| 41 | 11 | "Six Hours to Sky High" | Paul Henreid | Jack Hawn | November 25, 1967 |
A telegrapher with his three brothers plan to use dynamite on the railroad until he finds out his wife and son are on the train. Guest stars: Rex Holman, Bryan O'Byrne, Johnny Jensen, George Brenlin, George Berkeley, A.G. Vitanza, Sherwood Price, Gavin MacLeod, Joe Maross, and Fay Spain
| 42 | 12 | "T is for Traitor" | Tony Leader | Milton S. Gelman | December 2, 1967 |
Calhoun hires a former railroad engineer who saved Parsons and Rogers, but was branded as a traitor during the Civil War. Guest stars: Harlan Warde, Don Chaffin, Guy Remsen, Tony Epper, Bob Morgan, Peter Whitney, Kenneth Tobey, Woodrow Parfrey, and James Griffith
| 43 | 13 | "Dealer's Choice" | Herb Wallerstein | Stanley Adams & George F. Slavin | December 9, 1967 |
When Calhoun encounters two card sharks, he realizes he has been swindled. Guest stars: Duane Grey, Bill Quinn, William Challee, Hank Worden, Buck Buchanan, Douglas V. Fowley, Lee Meriwether, and Jack Kelly
| 44 | 14 | "Wild Track" | Gene Nelson | Gilbert Ralston | December 16, 1967 |
When the ownership of railway is disputed, Calhoun takes it over and ruins the plans of outlaws. Guest stars: Sidney Clute, Stuart Nisbet, Quentin Sondergaard, Russ Bender, Sam Greene, Jack Williams, Jack Perkins, Alan Hewitt, Whit Bissell, Judson Pratt, and Joanna Moore
| 45 | 15 | "Death Has Two Faces" | Paul Henreid | Gilbert Ralston | December 23, 1967 |
Calhoun wonders why two enemies won't sell the right away for the railroad when a mine is supposedly worthless. Guest stars: George Chandler, Harry Swoger, Steve Gravers, Karl Lukas, Andy Romano, Ralph Neff, Sam Flint, John Abbott, Norm Alden, William Bramley, Joyce Van Patten, and Dabney Coleman
| 46 | 16 | "The Prisoners" | Leo Penn | John Kneubuhl | December 30, 1967 |
A dying marshal (Warde) deputizes Tarrant who in turn deputizes Calhoun to take his prisoner to Doan's Junction. The prisoner's gang plans on breaking him free. Guest stars: Willard Sage, Harlan Warde, Mike Ragan, Henry Beckman, Karen Black, Jim McMullan, and Edward Asner
| 47 | 17 | "Dry Run to Glory" | Herb Wallerstein | Donald S. Tait | January 6, 1968 |
Victor Lamphier hijacks the train to exact revenge against Billy Joe. Guest stars: Joel Fluellen, Allen Jaffe, Jess Kirkpatrick, John McKee, Leslie Parrish, Dennis Cooney, and J.D. Cannon

== Critical response ==
Paul Henninger of the Los Angeles Times wrote, "A winning series". Lawrence Laurent of the Washington Post wrote, "Robertson comes off as the most engaging rogue." Dean Gysel of the Chicago Daily News wrote, "It's strictly for kids."

== Home media ==
On October 2, 2012, Sony Pictures Home Entertainment was set to release the first season of the series on DVD through an online manufacture-on-demand program via Amazon.com and Warner Bros, Archives, however, this release has been delayed.
