= Trial Run (1969 film) =

- Written by: Chester Krumholz
- Story by: Richard Levinson; William Link
- Directed by: William Graham
- Starring: James Franciscus; Diane Baker; Leslie Nielsen; Janice Rule
- Music by: Stanley Wilson
- Country of origin: United States
- Original language: English

Production
- Producer: Jack Laird
- Cinematography: Alric Edens
- Editor: Douglas Stewart
- Running time: 120 minutes
- Production company: Universal Television

Original release
- Release: 18 January 1969

Trial Run is a 1969 American drama television film directed by William Graham and produced by Jack Laird. The film stars James Franciscus, Diane Baker, Leslie Nielsen, and Janice Rule.

== Cast ==
- James Franciscus as Louis Coleman
- Diane Baker as Carole Trenet
- Leslie Nielsen as Jason Harkess
- Janice Rule as Lucille Harkness
- John Vernon as Leo D'Agosta
- David Sheiner as Noel Ferguson
- Fred Beir as Charles Andrews
- Paul Carr as Tyler Peters
- Lili Valenty as Mrs. Menderes
- Jack Collins as Henry Wycoff
- William Bramley as Karlson
- Bartlett Robinson as Larkin
- Vicki Medlin as Jeanne
- Hazel Scott as Herself
- Tim Matheson as Delivery person
