= Jack Laird =

American actor

- Born: Jack Laird Schultheis; May 8, 1923; Monrovia, California, U.S.
- Died: December 3, 1991 (aged 68); Los Angeles, California, U.S.
- Resting place: Hollywood Forever Cemetery
- Occupations: Screenwriter; Producer; Director; Actor
- Years active: 1949–1990
- Spouse: Cicely Ann Browne (1948-?) Peggy Jackson (1959-1964) Jeri Emmett (1964-1974)
- Children: 3

Jack Laird (born Jack Laird Schultheis; May 8, 1923 – December 3, 1991) was an American screenwriter, producer, director, and actor. He received three Primetime Emmy Award nominations for his works in Ben Casey, Night Gallery, and Kojak.

== Early life ==
Laird was born on May 8, 1923, in Monrovia, California, to Leonard Schultheis, a businessman, and Thelma Laird, a Theater Director who taught night school dramatics, and from whom Laird took classes, in his high school years he was art editor of the school newspaper, while a student at Pasadena Junior College, Laird formed his dance band "Aris Laird and his ARIStocrats of Swing", the group was made up of players who later joined the likes of Stan Kenton, Benny Goodman, and Les Brown, the band broke up when Laird enlisted in the Army Air Force during World War II, he was assigned as a pilot in the Ninth Air Force, he served with the First Allied Airborne while stationed in Manchester, England.

== Career ==
Laird entered the entertainment industry at a young age. One of his first appearances as a child actor was in an unbilled bit part in the 1934 film The Circus Clown. After his discharge from the army, Laird resumed civilian life in New York, where he enrolled at the Dramatic Workshop and studied playwriting under John Gassner, he returned to Hollywood for a screen test and ultimately starred in a series of movie and radio roles, including the radio crime drama This Is Your FBI, his television appearances include episodes of Fireside Theatre, Ben Casey and Ironside. He eventually moved into writing and producing, writing for various television shows, such as The Lone Ranger, The Millionaire, M Squad, Highway Patrol, Private Secretary, The Alfred Hitchcock Hour, Ford Theatre, The Wild Wild West, The Ann Sothern Show, Mr. District Attorney, and Have Gun – Will Travel. Laird distinguished himself as a writer and story editor on the medical show Ben Casey, eventually becoming an associate producer, he would receive an Emmy nomination in 1962 for his work on the Episode "I Remember a Lemon Tree", he then went on to write and produce independent projects for Universal Studio. In the 1970s, Laird came into his own as a Writer, Director, and Producer, working on such shows as The Psychiatrist, Night Gallery, Kojak, and many more.

One of Laird's favorite actors was Leslie Nielsen with whom he made several made-for-TV movies, including 1964's See How They Run, the first feature in that genre, Code Name: Heraclitus, Dark Intruder, The Return of Charlie Chan and numerous TV episodes. Nielsen also starred in a series produced by Laird, who was evidently an admirer of horror writer H.P. Lovecraft. He based at least two episodes of Night Gallery on Lovecraft's work – "Pickman's Model" (based directly on the Lovecraft story of the same title Pickman's Model) and "Professor Peabody's Last Lecture". The dialogue of the 1965 horror movie Dark Intruder, produced by Laird, includes some references to alien beings invented by Lovecraft, tying the film to Lovecraft's Cthulhu Mythos. In an early scene where Brett Kingsford meets with the police commissioner, opines that "gods older than the human race...deities like Dagon and Azathoth still have worshippers."

== Personal life ==
On January 17, 1948, Laird married his first wife, actress Cicely Ann Browne, but due to their careers, the marriage ended, Browne retained custody of their son, Sean. On February 22, 1959, Laird married his second wife, Peggy Jackson, a young stage actress who would later appear on the medical show Ben Casey as Nurse Van Buren, they had a daughter, Sharon, after five years, Jackson and Laird divorced. In November 1964, Laird married his third wife, Jeri Emmett, a former Playboy Bunny turned writer, they had a daughter, Persephone, through his marriage to Emmett, Laird would become step-father to her other children, Kurtis, Michael, and Journey, Emmett had written a few episodes for such television shows as, The Fugitive, Iron Horse, The Bold Ones: The Protectors (under the name Betty Deveraux), and Mannix, as well as a Television Series Treatment called "Confessions of a Den Mother", and a book about her days working at the playboy club called "Point Your Tail in The Right Direction".

He was an avid film collector and jazz fan.

== Death ==
Laird died of heart disease on December 3, 1991, in Los Angeles at the age of 68. His final resting place in Hollywood Forever Cemetery is in the "Garden of Legends" (formerly Section 8), Lot 266. His grave is next to the cenotaph of actress Jayne Mansfield.

== Filmography ==
=== Films ===
Year	Film	Credit	Notes
1934	The Circus Clown	Actor (Uncredited)	Role: Child
1949	Mr. Belvedere Goes to College	Actor (Uncredited)	Role: Dr. Phillips
1949	Sword in the Desert	Actor (Uncredited)	Role: Orderly
1950	Francis	Actor (Uncredited)	Role: Switchboard Operator
1951	Call Me Mister	Actor (Uncredited)	Role: Soldier
1951	Journey into Light	Actor (Uncredited)	Role: Worms
1964	The Hanged Man	Writer	Television Movie, Co-Wrote Screenplay with "Stanford Whitmore"
1964	See How They Run	Producer	
1965	Dark Intruder	Producer	
1967	Code Name: Heraclitus	Producer	
1967	How I Spent My Summer Vacation	Producer	
1967	Ready and Willing	Producer	
1968	Shadow Over Elveron	Producer	
1969	Trial Run	Producer	
1969	Destiny of a Spy	Producer	
1970	The Movie Murderer	Producer	
1970	Hauser's Memory	Producer	
1973	Amanda Fallon	Director, Producer	
1973	The Return of Charlie Chan	Producer	
1975	One of Our Own	Writer, Producer	
1976	Perilous Voyage	Producer	
1979	Beggarman, Thief	Producer	
1981	Hellinger's Law	Writer, Executive Producer	Co-Wrote Screenplay with "Peter S. Fischer"
1990	Kojak: It's Always Something	Writer	
1990	Kojak: None So Blind	Writer	Co-Wrote Screenplay with "Scott Shepherd"
1990	The Bride in Black	Writer	Co-Wrote Story with "Claire Labine"

=== Television ===
Year	TV Series	Credit	Notes
1951	Racket Squad	Writer	1 Episode
1952	China Smith	Writer	Unknown Episodes
1952	Rebound	Actor	2 Episodes
1952	Your Jeweler's Showcase	Writer	1 Episode
1952	The Unexpected	Writer	2 Episodes
1953	The Adventures of Wild Bill Hickok	Writer	1 Episode
1953	The Doctor	Writer	1 Episode
1954	Waterfront	Writer	1 Episode
1954	The New Adventures of China Smith	Writer	3 Episodes
1954	Kraft Television Theatre	Writer	1 Episode
1954	Private Secretary	Writer	1 Episode
1954-55	The Lone Ranger	Writer	6 Episodes
1954-55	Mr. District Attorney	Writer	3 Episodes
1955	Fireside Theatre	Writer	1 Episode
1955	Brave Eagle	Writer	1 Episode
1955	Cavalcade of America	Writer	4 Episodes
1955-57	Highway Patrol	Writer	4 Episodes
1956	Warner Bros. Presents	Writer	2 Episodes
1956	Celebrity Playhouse	Writer	4 Episodes
1956	Matinee Theater	Writer	5 Episodes
1956	The Man Called X	Writer	2 Episodes
1956-57	Dr. Christian	Writer	6 Episodes
1957	Men of Annapolis	Writer	2 Episode
1957	Code 3	Writer	5 Episodes
1957	Wire Service	Writer	1 Episode
1957-58	Broken Arrow	Writer	3 Episodes
1957-59	M Squad	Writer	12 Episodes
1957-60	The Millionaire	Writer	6 Episodes
1958	The Restless Gun	Writer	1 Episode
1958	Man Without a Gun	Writer	3 Episodes
1958	Target	Writer	1 Episode
1958	Rescue 8	Writer	1 Episode
1958-59	Man with a Camera	Writer	2 Episodes
1958-59	Flight	Writer	3 Episodes
1958-62	Have Gun – Will Travel	Writer	7 Episodes
1959	Tales of Wells Fargo	Writer	1 Episode
1959	21 Beacon Street	Writer	1 Episode
1959	The Third Man	Writer	1 Episode
1959	Dragnet	Writer	1 Episode
1959	World of Giants	Writer	1 Episode
1959	The Lineup	Writer	1 Episode
1959	New York Confidential	Writer	2 Episodes
1959	Not for Hire	Writer	1 Episode
1959-60	Hotel de Paree	Writer	4 Episodes
1959-60	Bronco	Writer	2 Episodes
1959-61	The Rebel	Writer	4 Episodes
1960	Pony Express	Writer	1 Episode
1960	The Man from Blackhawk	Writer	1 Episode
1960-61	Dante	Writer	2 Episodes
1960-62	My Three Sons	Writer	2 Episodes
1961	The Detectives	Writer	1 Episode
1961	The Brothers Brannagan	Writer	2 Episodes
1961-65	Ben Casey	Writer, Story Editor, Producer, Associate Producer, Actor	Multiple Episodes
1964	Channing	Writer, Producer, Executive Producer	17 Episodes
1964	Kraft Suspense Theatre	Producer	2 Episodes
1964-67	Bob Hope Presents the Chrysler Theatre	Writer, Director, Producer	Multiple Episodes
1966	The Wild Wild West	Writer	2 Episodes
1969-70	The Bold Ones: The Protectors	Executive Producer	5 Episodes
1970	The Psychiatrist	Story Consultant	1 Episode
1970-73	Night Gallery	Writer, Director, Producer, Actor	43 Episodes
1972-73	The Bold Ones: The New Doctors	Producer	2 Episodes
1973	Dr. Simon Locke	Writer	1 Episode
1973-77	Kojak	Writer, Supervising Producer	78 Episodes
1975-76	Doctors' Hospital	Writer, Producer	13 Episodes
1976-77	Switch	Producer, Supervising Producer	9 Episodes
1977	Testimony of Two Men	Producer	3 Episodes
1978	The Dark Secret of Harvest Home	Producer	2 Episodes
1978	What Really Happened to the Class of '65?	Writer, Producer	4 Episodes
1981	The Gangster Chronicles	Producer	13 Episodes
1984	Whiz Kids	Writer (Uncredited)	1 Episode
1984-85	Deadly Nightmares	Production Consultant	10 Episodes
1985	Hell Town	Writer	1 Episode
1985	The Insiders	Writer	2 Episodes

=== Unproduced Projects ===
Throughout his career Jack Laird had a number of projects that were never produced or broadcast:

- From The 1950s to the 1960s, Laird wrote several spec scripts, which included, "Red Wolf Crossing", which was an adaptation of the Will Henry novel "To Follow a Flag", "A God in a Garden", which was based on an original story by Theodore Sturgeon, "An Extenuating Circumstance", a screenplay Laird co-wrote with Charles F. Haas, that was adapted from the story "A Coward" By Guy de Maupassant, "The Steel Trap", which was based on a story by William T. Orr, "Three Marked Pennies", which was based on a story By Mary Elizabeth Counselman, "Four Cornered Triangle" an original screenplay Laird wrote, "A Day Off", which was based on a story By Walter Gilkyson, he was also set to produce five projects, "Crime! Pleasant Dreams Sweet Celia", a screenplay written by Gene R. Kearney, "Out of the Darkness", a screenplay written by Barré Lyndon and Alvin Sapinsley, "Fires, Bombs, and Patriots", a screenplay written by Abby Mann, "The Invisible Man", based on the H. G. Wells novel of the same name that was adapted by Howard Rodman, and "The Other Place", a screenplay written by Theodore Sturgeon.
- In early 1967, Laird and Herman Miller had written an early draft of Coogan's Bluff.
- In 1969, Laird was attached to two film projects that were never produced, "The Richest Hill on Earth" which was written by Halsted Welles (Based on a treatment by Laird), and "Unit Theta", which was written by Wilton Schiller.
- From the 1950s to the 1980s, Laird had written or had developed several Television Series Treatments that were never picked up called "Daniel Boone: The Gun Runners", "Talmadge", "Brute Force", "Atonement", "...& Cucamonga", "E.Z. Wheeler: Ex-Cop", "In The Name of the Law", "Newsroom", "Code Name: Damocles" "Senior Year", "The Lorne Greene Project", and "Tokatyan".
- At the time of his death, Laird was working on a television series based on stories by thriller writer Robert Ludlum
- In 1967, he created an unsold comedy pilot, The Return of the Original Yellow Tornado, about two elderly, retired superheroes Mickey Rooney is the original Yellow Tornado and Eddie Mayehoff is his retired sidekick who must once again don their leotards to do battle with a super-villain who has been set free and has vowed to destroy the world. The pilot was eventually expanded to a film-that was never released.
- In 1972, he worked as producer on one of the pilot episodes produced for Biography, an unsold TV series. Four pilots were completed and eventually appeared as TV movies, but Laird's episode about Houdini was never filmed.
- In the 1970s, Laird was attached to several film projects, a spec script he had written called "Hotel Imperial – Tokyo", which was based on an original story by Alan Lee, "Mantrap", a spec script he co-wrote with Wilton Schiller, "The Broken-Field Runner", a screenplay written by Fred Segal, which Laird was going to produce.
- In 1988, Laird wrote a spec script that was called "Suffer The Little Children".
