= Goodyear Theatre =

American TV dramatic anthology series (1957–1960)

- Also known as: Award Theatre; Golden Years of Television
- Genre: Anthology
- Directed by: Lewis Allen; Robert Florey; Tay Garnett; Peter Godfrey; Walter Grauman; David Greene; Paul Henreid; Arthur Hiller; Lamont Johnson; Sidney Lanfield; Ray Milland; Robert Ellis Miller; Boris Sagal; Don Taylor
- Country of origin: United States
- Original language: English
- No. of seasons: 3
- No. of episodes: 114

Production
- Producers: James Fonda; Jules Goldstone; Winston O'Keefe; William Sackheim
- Running time: 30 mins.

Original release
- Network: NBC
- Release: September 30, 1957 – May 23, 1960

Related
- Goodyear Television Playhouse

Goodyear Theatre (also known as Award Theatre and Golden Years of Television) is a 30-minute dramatic television anthology series telecast on NBC from October 14, 1957, to September 12, 1960.

== Cast ==
Actors appearing in the series included:

- Parley Baer (2 episodes, 1958-1959)
- Felicia Montealegre Bernstein (1 episode, 1952)
- Charles Boyer (unknown episodes, 1957-1958)
- Russ Conway (2 episodes, 1958)
- Pat Crowley (2 episodes, 1959-1960)
- John Doucette (2 episodes, 1958)
- Paul Douglas (2 episodes, 1958-1959)
- Errol Flynn
- Virginia Gregg (3 episodes, 1957-1959)
- Vivi Janiss (2 episodes, 1958-1960)
- Richard Kiley
- Michael Landon
- John Larch
- Peter Leeds (3 episodes, 1958)
- Jack Lemmon (4 episodes, 1957-1958)
- Dayton Lummis (2 episodes, 1958-1959)
- James Mason
- James McCallion (2 episodes, 1958-1959)
- Patty McCormack
- Ray Milland
- Cameron Mitchell
- David Niven (4 episodes, 1957-1958)
- Jane Powell (4 episodes, 1957-1958)
- Judson Pratt as Colonel Holt in "Point of Impact" (1959)
- Tony Randall (2 episodes, 1959)
- Edward G. Robinson
- Robert Ryan (5 episodes, 1957-1958)
- Willard Sage (2 episodes, 1958-1960)
- Jacqueline Scott (2 episodes, 1959-1960)
- Barbara Stanwyck
- Chet Stratton (2 episodes, 1959-1960)
- Rod Taylor
- Lurene Tuttle (2 episodes, 1959-1960)
- Eli Wallach
- Gig Young

== Episodes ==
Partial List of Episodes of Goodyear Theatre
Date	Episode
October 14, 1957	"Lost and Found"
November 11, 1957	"Voice in the Fog"
January 6, 1958	"The Victim"
February 17, 1958	"White Flag"
March 17, 1958	"The Seventh Letter"
April 28, 1958	"The Giant Step"
June 9, 1958	"Disappearance"
September 29, 1958	"The Chain and the River"
November 24, 1958	"Guy in Ward 4"
March 2, 1959	"A Good Name"
April 17, 1959	"I Remember Cavair"
September 29, 1959	"Hello, Charlie"
April 11, 1960	"Author at Work"

== Production ==
Fifty-five episodes were made. The live show was directed by many notable directors, including Don Taylor, Arthur Hiller (3 episodes, 1958–59) and Robert Ellis Miller (3 episodes, 1958–59). It followed Goodyear Television Playhouse (1951). Dayton Productions, a subsidiary of Four Star Productions, produced the show, which alternated with Alcoa Theatre.

== Critical response ==
Episodes of Goodyear Theatre reviewed in The New York Times included the following:

- September 29, 1958: The episode was called "an unconvincing story", and the review said, "It made for a drab and pointless thirty minutes of television."
- November 24, 1958: The review said that "a facile and unsatisfactory conclusion" marred what might otherwise have been "an interesting drama".
- April 11, 1960: The review summarized the episode as "an unsubstantial and only faintly amusing suspense story".

== Promotion ==
In the spring of 1959, a joint effort between the producers of Goodyear Theatre and the publishers of Practical English magazine involved approximately 500,000 high school students in a study based on the program's April 17, 1959, episode. An issue of the magazine that contained the complete script of "I Remember Cavair" went to teachers prior to the broadcast to enable students to read the script and perform it in their classes. After the program was presented on TV, students were to evaluate that performance and compare it with their own.
