= Bartlett Robinson =

American actor (1912–1986)

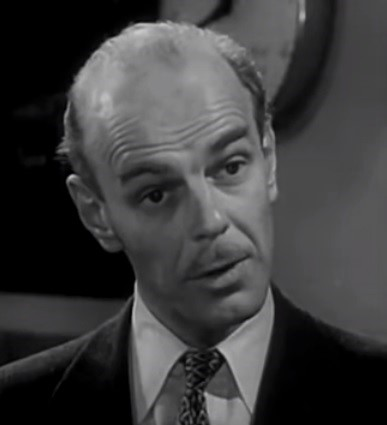
- Bartlett Robinson in "All the Lonely Night", a 1955 episode of Medic
- Born: December 9, 1912; New York City, US
- Died: March 26, 1986 (aged 73); Fallbrook, California, US
- Occupation: Actor
- Years active: 1933–1982
- Spouse(s): Margaret Ballantine (1938–1971; divorced); Margaret Ballantine (19??-1986; remarried until his death)
- Children: 2

Bartlett Whitney Robinson (December 9, 1912 – March 26, 1986) was an American actor who performed on radio, the stage, in films, and on television for five decades. In 1943 he was the first actor of several performers who provided the voice of the title character on the radio version of Perry Mason. Later, as a character actor in films and on television, he was often cast in roles of authority figures, such as military officers, wealthy ranchers, corporate executives, doctors, and judges. Robinson appeared in 21 films from 1956 to 1973 and in over 110 television productions between 1949 and 1982. He was also credited as Bart Robinson.

== Early life, radio and stage ==
Bartlett Robinson was born in Manhattan, New York, on December 9, 1912. He began his career in entertainment in 1933 when he and his friends formed a performance group called the "Sunday Players," who later drove across country together to Los Angeles, California, in hopes of finding steady work. There Robinson subsequently got a job in the city at radio station KFI. For the remainder of the 1930s and into the 1940s, Robinson traveled back and forth between New York and Los Angeles to take parts in both stage and radio productions. Some of his roles in old-time radio programs included the following:

Program	Role
Backstage Wife	Rupert
Foreign Assignment	Barry Brian
Perry Mason	Perry Mason
Portia Faces Life	Walter Manning
Pretty Kitty Kelly	Byron Welby
Valiant Lady (radio)	Truman Scott
Backstage Wife	
Young Doctor Malone	
The Romance of Helen Trent	

Robinson was cast in stage productions for two decades and appeared in plays with stars such as Henry Fonda and Lillian Gish. He would continue to be active in theater well into the 1950s. A few of his Broadway credits are Naughty Naught '00 (1936), Sweet River (1936), Dear Ruth (1944), The Girl in Pink Tights (1953), and The Prescott Proposals (1953).

== Film and television career ==
By the late 1940s and throughout the 1950s, Robinson began to focus his acting career on productions in the rapidly expanding medium of television and on film projects. On June 13, 1949, he appeared on television in "Light Up the Sky", an episode on the anthology series The Ford Theatre Hour. He made his film debut playing the part of a guest in the 1956 comedy The Birds and the Bees, which starred George Gobel, Mitzi Gaynor and David Niven. Earlier, he had appeared in other television episodes, including Ski Story on the Armstrong Circle Theatre, which aired 13 January 1953. Among others television series, he made guest appearances in seven episodes of Gunsmoke (1956 -1960). Robinson made guest appearances in eight episodes of Alfred Hitchcock Presents (1958 - 1962), six episodes of Perry Mason (1959 - 1966) and two episodes of The Twilight Zone (1961 - 1962). He played the role of Frank Caldwell in 26 episodes of Mona McCluskey (1965–1966) and appeared in many other episodes, predominantly in supporting roles. His last appearance on television was in the episode "Law" on the television series Lou Grant, which aired on April 12, 1982 playing Jacob Bauman, a character he had already portrayed on the series in a 1979 episode titled "Witness". His final credited motion picture role was that of Dr. Orva in Woody Allen's 1973 film Sleeper.

== Personal life and death ==
Bartlett Robinson married Margaret Whitney Ballantine in 1938. The couple had two children and remained wedded for 33 years, until their divorce in 1971. They later remarried, a union that lasted until 1986 when he died of cancer at his home in Fallbrook, California, at age 73.

== Film and television credits ==
=== Films ===
- 1956: The Birds and the Bees (directed by Norman Taurog) as Guest
- 1956: Toward the Unknown (directed by Mervyn LeRoy) as Senator Black
- 1957: Battle Hymn (directed by Douglas Sirk) as General Timberidge
- 1957: The Spirit of St. Louis (directed by Billy Wilder) as Benjamin Frank Mahoney, President Ryan Airlines Company
- 1958: No Time for Sergeants (directed by Mervyn LeRoy) as Captain
- 1958: Girl in the Woods (directed by Tom Gries) as Doctor Wyndham
- 1958: I Want to Live! (directed by Robert Wise) as District Attorney Milton
- 1959: A Stranger in My Arms (directed by Helmut Käutner) as Colonel Bert Wayne
- 1959: Warlock (directed by Edward Dmytryk) as Buck Slavin
- 1961: All Hands on Deck (directed by Norman Taurog) as Lieutenant Commander Anthony
- 1964: A Distant Trumpet (directed by Raoul Walsh) as Major Hiram Prescott
- 1964: Where Love Has Gone (directed by Edward Dmytryk) as Mr. John Coleman
- 1965: Joy in the Morning (directed by Alex Segal) as Professor Victor Newcole
- 1966: The Fortune Cookie (directed by Billy Wilder) as Specialist #1
- 1966: Dawn of Victory (Short)
- 1968: Live a Little, Love a Little (directed by Norman Taurog) as Doctor (uncredited)
- 1968: The Bamboo Saucer (directed by Frank Telford) as Rhodes
- 1969: The Wrecking Crew (directed by Phil Karlson) as Wellington (uncredited)
- 1969: Marlowe (directed by Paul Bogart) as Wellington (uncredited)
- 1970: R. P. M. (directed by Stanley Kramer) as 1st Professor at dining table (uncredited)
- 1973: Sleeper (directed by Woody Allen) as Dr. Orva

=== Television ===
- 1949: The Ford Theatre Hour (Season 1 Episode 9: "Light Up the Sky") as Tyler Rayburn
- 1953: Armstrong Circle Theater (Season 3 Episode 13: "Sky Story")
- 1953: Goodyear Television Playhouse (Season 2 Episode 24: "Hollywood Tandem")
- 1953-1954: The Philco Television Playhouse (2 episodes)
  - (Season 5 Episode 22: "A Little Something in Reserve") (1953)
  - (Season 6 Episode 21: "Friday the Thirteenth") (1954)
- 1955: Medic (Season 2 Episode 1: "All the Lonely Night") as Dr. Hershon
- 1955-1956: Big Town (2 episodes)
  - (Season 6 Episode 6: "Prison Riot") (1955)
  - (Season 6 Episode 22: "School Scandal") (1956)
- 1956: Crusader (Season 1 Episode 31: "A Quiet Town") as George Carlson
- 1956: Lux Video Theatre (3 episodes)
  - (Season 6 Episode 42: "Sting in the Tail") as Dr. Blaine
  - (Season 7 Episode 8: "Jezebel") as Dr. Durette
  - (Season 7 Episode 12: "Christmas in Connecticut") as John
- 1956-1959: Playhouse 90 (3 episodes)
  - (Season 1 Episode 8: "Eloise") (1956) as Price, Eloise's Lawyer
  - (Season 2 Episode 13: "Galvanized Yankee") (1957)
  - (Season 4 Episode 6: "The Tunnel") (1959) as Captain Handley
- 1956-1960: Gunsmoke (7 episodes)
  - (Season 2 Episode 14: "Cholera") (1956) as Gabriel
  - (Season 3 Episode 13: "Cows & Cribs") (1957) as Emmett Bowers
  - (Season 3 Episode 27: "Joke's on Us") (1958) as Jake Kaiser
  - (Season 4 Episode 5: "Letter of the Law") (1958) as Lee Sprague
  - (Season 4 Episode 24: "Doc Quits") (1959) as Jake Wirth
  - (Season 5 Episode 3: "Horse Deal") (1959) as Bowers
  - (Season 5 Episode 25: "Jailbait Janet") (1960) as Krocker
- 1957: Telephone Time (Season 3 Episode 6: "The Man the Navy Couldn't Seek")
- 1957: Meet McGraw (Season 1 Episode 17: "Lucky's Diner") as Ardmore
- 1957: Fireside Theatre (Season 3 Episode 11: "The Night After Christmas")
- 1957-1958: Climax! (2 episodes)
  - (Season 3 Episode 13: "The Gold Dress" (1957)
  - (Season 4 Episode 21: "So Deadly My Love" (1958)
- 1957-1959 Whirlybirds (3 episodes)
  - (Season 1 Episode 27: "Journey to the Past") (1957) as Alexander Ford
  - (Season 2 Episode 2: "The Ashley Case") (1958) as Dreyden
  - (Season 3 Episode 21: "Wanted: Alive") (1959) as Raymond
- 1957-1961: Maverick (2 episodes)
  - (Season 1 Episode 11: "The Wrecker" (1957) as Longhurst
  - (Season 4 Episode 26: "The Deadly Image" (1961) as Captain Ranson
- 1958: Cheyenne (Season 3 Episode 11: "Renegades") as Colonel Ralph Donovan
- 1958: State Trooper (Season 2 Episode 14: "Full Circle") as Vincent Marco
- 1958: Father Knows Best (Season 4 Episode 23: "Poor Old Dad") as Wes Coglan
- 1958: The Court of Last Resort (Season 1 Episode 24: "The Joel Sheldon Case") as Rod Moore
- 1958: M Squad (Season 1 Episode 28: "Shot in the Dark") as Henry Hellstrom
- 1958: Tombstone Territory (Season 1 Episode 30: "Triangle of Death") as Aaron McCafin
- 1958: The Walter Winchell File (Season 6 Episode 18: "The Dice of Fortune: File #34") as Alex
- 1958: Bachelor Father (3 episodes) as Phil Corey
  - (Season 1 Episode 9: "Bentley and the Talent Contest")
  - (Season 1 Episode 13: "Bentley and the Social Worker")
  - (Season 2 Episode 1: "Bentley and the Finishing School")
- 1958: The Restless Gun (Season 2 Episode 8: "Remember the Dead") as George Mason
- 1958: Yancy Derringer (Season 1 Episode 8: "The Saga of Lonesome Jackson") as Stephen Quayne
- 1958: Peter Gunn (Season 1 Episode 12: "The Torch") as Stanley Glidden
- 1958: Steve Canyon (Season 1 Episode 14: "Operation Diplomat") as Ambassador Grey
- 1958-1959: Richard Diamond, Private Detective (4 episodes)
  - (Season 2 Episode 3: "The Payoff") (1958) as Otto Carl
  - (Season 2 Episode 16: "Lost Testament") (1958) as Paul Manners
  - (Season 3 Episode 9: "Charity Affair") (1959) as Clifton
  - (Season 3 Episode 22: "The Client") (1959) as Albert Gunther
- 1958-1959: Westinghouse Desilu Playhouse (3 episodes)
  - (Season 1 Episode 6: "The Time Element") (1958) as Mr. Gibbons
  - (Season 1 Episode 20: "The Untouchables: Part 1") (1959) as Judge
  - (Season 1 Episode 21: "The Untouchables: Part 2") (1959) as Judge
- 1958-1959: Zane Grey Theatre (4 episodes)
  - (Season 3 Episode 12: "Medal for Valor") (1958) as James Harder
  - (Season 3 Episode 17: "Trail Incident") (1959) as Timothy Owens
  - (Season 3 Episode 22: "The Loner") (1959) as Mayor Hartford
  - (Season 4 Episode 9: "King of the Valley") (1959) as Charlie Coleman
- 1958-1962: Alfred Hitchcock Presents (8 episodes)
  - (Season 3 Episode 24: "The Foghorn") (1958) as John St. Rogers
  - (Season 3 Episode 39: "Little White Frock") (1958) as Mr. Robinson
  - (Season 4 Episode 7: "Man with a Problem") (1958) as Hotel Manager
  - (Season 5 Episode 29: "The Hero") (1960) as Henry Caldwell
  - (Season 6 Episode 10: "Sybilla") (1960) as Lawyer
  - (Season 6 Episode 34: "Servant Problem") (1961) as George Colton
  - (Season 6 Episode 36: "Final Arrangements") (1961) as Dr. Maxwell
  - (Season 7 Episode 14: "Bad Actor") (1962) as Donald Wellman
- 1958-1962: 77 Sunset Strip (2 episodes)
  - (Season 1 Episode 8: "The Well-Selected Frame" (1958) as Howard Stacey
  - (Season 4 Episode 20: "The Bridal Trail Caper" (1962) as Dean Hartley
- 1959: The Third Man (Season 1 Episode 4: "Death of an Overlord") as Ward Spender
- 1959: Lux Playhouse (Season 1 Episode 11: "Stand-In for Murder") as Niles
- 1959: Schlitz Playhouse of Stars (Season 8 Episode 13: "Ivy League") as Dean Henderson
- 1959: The Rifleman (Season 1 Episode 38: "Outlaw's Inheritance") as Samuel Britton
- 1959: Johnny Ringo (Season 1 Episode 3: "The Accused") as Trask
- 1959: Men into Space (Season 1 Episode 3: "Building a Space Station") as General Robert Hicks
- 1959: Startime (Season 1 Episode 6: "The Wicked Scheme of Jebal Deeks") as Elliott
- 1959: Hennesey (Season 1 Episode 12: "The Christmas Show") as Commander Jenkins
- 1959-1961: The Untouchables (3 episodes)
  - (Season 1 Episode: "Pilot" (1959) as Judge
  - (Season 1 Episode 18: "Little Egypt" (1959) as Mayor Marcus Stone
  - (Season 2 Episode 12: "The Big Train: Part 1" (1961) as Federal Judge James H. Wilkerson
- 1959-1963: Laramie (9 episodes)
  - (Season 1 Episode 6: "The Lawbreakers") (1959) as Sheriff
  - (Season 1 Episode 15: "Night of the Quiet Man") (1959) as Sheriff
  - (Season 1 Episode 22: "Rope of Steel") (1960) as Sheriff
  - (Season 2 Episode 12: "Duel at Parkison Town") (1960) as Sheriff
  - (Season 2 Episode 14: "The Passing of Kuba Smith") (1961) as Sheriff
  - (Season 2 Episode 15: "Man from Kansas") (1961) as Sheriff
  - (Season 2 Episode 25: "The Debt") (1961) as Jim, the Telegrapher
  - (Season 4 Episode 19: "The Fugitives") (1963) as Munson
  - (Season 4 Episode 24: "The Sometime Gambler") (1963) as Werner
- 1959-1966: Perry Mason (6 episodes)
  - (Season 2 Episode 16: "The Case of the Fraudulent Foto" (1959) as Marshall Scott
  - (Season 5 Episode 21: "The Case of the Mystified Miner" (1962) as Endicott Campbell
  - (Season 6 Episode 11: "The Case of the Fickle Filly" (1962) as Emmett Pierson
  - (Season 7 Episode 20: "The Case of the Frightened Fisherman" (1964) as Hudson Bradshaw
  - (Season 8 Episode 28: "The Case of the Grinning Gorilla" (1965) as Sydney Hardwick
  - (Season 9 Episode 18: "The Case of the Golfer's Gambit" (1966) as Edward 'Pat' Patterson
- 1959-1970: Bonanza (3 episodes)
  - (Season 1 Episode 13: "Vendetta" (1959) as Ralph Carter
  - (Season 8 Episode 24: "Judgment at Red Creek" (1967) as Willow
  - (Season 11 Episode 22: "Return Engagement" (1970) as Bryce Howell
- 1960: Markham (Season 1 Episode 32: "The Ambitious Wife") as Douglas Nicholson
- 1960: Fury (Season 5 Episode16: "Gymkhana") as Fred Hughes
- 1960: Mr. Lucky (Season 1 Episode 18: "The Parolee") as Joe Hardiman
- 1960: Bronco (Season 2 Episode 13: "Death of an Outlaw") as L.G. Murphy
- 1960: Overland Trail (Season 1 Episode 15: "Escort Detail") as Major Evans
- 1960: Riverboat (2 episodes)
  - (Season 1 Episode 31: "The Sellout") as George Channing
  - (Season 2 Episode 5: "No Bridge on the River") as Grimes
- 1960: Hawaiian Eye (Season 2 Episode 15: "Services Rendered") as Ellis P. Adams
- 1960-1961: The Lawless Years (2 episodes)
  - (Season 2 Episode 9: "The Prantera Story" (1960) as Clay Mason
  - (Season 3 Episode 9: "The Kid Dropper Story" (1961) as District Attorney
- 1960-1962: Leave It to Beaver (2 episodes)
  - (Season 3 Episode 34: "Beaver, the Model") (1960) as George Compton
  - (Season 5 Episode 32: "The Yard Birds") (1962) as Mr. Hill
- 1960-1962: Outlaws (2 episodes)
  - (Season 1 Episode 6: "Last Chance" (1960) as Minister
  - (Season 2 Episode 18: "The Sisters" (1962) as Russell
- 1961: The Life and Legend of Wyatt Earp (Season 6 Episode 14: "Billy Bucket, Incorporated") as Paul Scott
- 1961: The Case of the Dangerous Robin (Season 1 Episode 24: "The Deadly Impersonation")
- 1961: The Brothers Brannagan (Season 1 Episode 27: "Sunday Jewels") as Carstairs
- 1961: Thriller (Season 1 Episode 29: "The Devil's Ticket") as Art Critic
- 1961: The Many Loves of Dobie Gillis (Season 2 Episode 26: "The Battle of Maynard's Beard") as Colonel
- 1961: Whispering Smith (Season 1 Episode 7: "The Deadliest Weapon") as Ralph Miller
- 1961: Follow the Sun (Season 1 Episode 3: "The Highest Wall") as Bunker
- 1961-1962: The Twilight Zone (2 episodes)
  - (Season 2 Episode 13: "Back There") (1961) as William
  - (Season 3 Episode 24: "To Serve Man") (1962) as Colonel #1
- 1962: Cain's Hundred (Season 1 Episode 16: "The Debasers: Milton Bonner and Phillip Colerane") as Foster Fallon
- 1962: The New Breed (3 episodes)
  - (Season 1 Episode 26: "Edge of Violence") as Victor Kredenza
  - (Season 1 Episode 30: "Hail, Hail, the Gang's All Here") as Farnum
  - (Season 1 Episode 36: "Walk This Street Lightly")
- 1962: Stoney Burke (Season 1 Episode 1: "The Contender") as Everett B. Fields
- 1962: The Dick Powell Show (Season 2 Episode 8: "In Search of a Son") as Tebbets
- 1962: My Three Sons (Season 3 Episode 11: "Heat Wave") as Milton Gibson
- 1962-1963: Alcoa Premiere (2 episodes)
  - (Season 1 Episode 17: "Of This Time, of This Place") (1962) as Doctor
  - (Season 2 Episode 30: "The Town That Died") (1963) as Harkness
- 1963: The Dakotas (Season 1 Episode 12: "Trail at Grand Forks") as Judge Elias Stone
- 1963 The Eleventh Hour (Season 1 Episode 27: "Try to Keep Alive Until Next Tuesday") as Dr. Warren
- 1964: Kraft Suspense Theatre (Season 1 Episode 15: "My Enemy, This Town") as Prosecutor
- 1964: Ready for the People (made-for-television movie) as John T. McGrane
- 1964: My Living Doll (Season 1 Episode 12: "Foreign Relations") as Howard Vines
- 1964: The Andy Griffith Show (Season 5 Episode 15: "Otis Sues the County") as Mr. Roberts
- 1964-1965: The Alfred Hitchcock Hour (3 episodes)
  - (Season 2 Episode 16: "The Evil of Adelaide Winters") (1964) as Mr. Thompson
  - (Season 2 Episode 25: "The Ordeal of Mrs. Snow") (1964) as Harvey Crane
  - (Season 3 Episode 15: "Thanatos Palace Hotel") (1965) as Mr. J. Smith
- 1964-1965: Wendy and Me (10 episodes) as Willard Norton
  - (Season 1 Episode 4: "Wendy's Secret Wedding") (1964)
  - (Season 1 Episode 9: "Room at the Bottom") (1964)
  - (Season 1 Episode 11: "Wendy, the Waitress") (1964)
  - (Season 1 Episode 12: "Belle of the Malt Shop") (1964)
  - (Season 1 Episode 13: "East is East, and West is Wendy") (1964)
  - (Season 1 Episode 15: "Wendy, the Woman in the Gray Flannel Suit") (1964)
  - (Season 1 Episode 19: "Who's in the Guest Room Tonight?") (1965)
  - (Season 1 Episode 20: "Wendy Sails in the Sunset") (1965)
  - (Season 1 Episode 25: "Wendy Gives Uncle the Brush") (1965)
  - (Season 1 Episode 30: "Wendy's Instant Intellect") (1965)
- 1965: Slattery's People (Season 1 Episode 22: "Question: Who Are You Taking to the Main Event, Eddie?") as Representative Jasper Bennett
- 1965: The Cara Williams Show (Season 1 Episode 25: "Fletcher Succeeds in Business Without Really Trying") as Watson
- 1965: The Munsters (Season 1 Episode 35: "Herman's Happy Valley") as Mr. Curtis
- 1965: O.K. Crackerby! (2 episodes) as Mr. Holbrook
  - (Season 1 Episode 1: "O.K. Crackerby Arrives")
  - (Season 1 Episode 2: "The Wellecliffe Story")
- 1965: Bewitched (Season 2 Episode 3: "We're in for a Bad Spell") as Mr. Abercrombie
- 1965: The Smothers Brothers Show (1 Episode) as MacFallen
- 1965: F Troop (Season 1 Episode 10: "She's Only a Build in a Girdled Cage") as Colonel Griswald
- 1965: My Mother the Car (Season 1 Episode 11: "My Son, the Judge") as Horace Congrieve
- 1965: Burke's Law (2 episodes) as Robert Benbow / Gentleman
  - (Season 3 Episode 2: "Operation Long Shadow")
  - (Season 3 Episode 12: "The Man's Men")
- 1965-1966: Mona McCluskey (26 episodes) as Frank Caldwell
- 1966: The Wild Wild West (Season 1 Episode 24: "The Night of the Druid's Blood") as Senator Waterford
- 1966: The Felony Squad (Season 1 Episode 12: "The Terror Trap") as Peel
- 1967: Love on a Rooftop (Season 1 Episode 29: "Debt of Gratitude") as Bradshaw
- 1967: Gilligan's Island (Season 3 Episode 29: "Bang! Bang! Bang!") as Hartley
- 1967: The Lucy Show (Season 6 Episode 2: "Lucy Gets Trapped") as Mr. Wilkins
- 1967: Judd, for the Defense (Season 1 Episode 6: "Conspiracy") as Arthur Kincaid
- 1967: Ironside (Season 1 Episode 13: "The Past is Prologue") as Attorney Whittier
- 1967–1969: The Guns of Will Sonnett (3 episodes)
  - (Season 1 Episode 4: "The Natural Way") (1967) as Sam Wilson
  - (Season 2 Episode 22: "The Sodbuster") (1967) as Banker
  - (Season 2 Episode 24: "Three Stand Together") (1969) as Mayor of Samson
- 1967-1969: Petticoat Junction (2 episodes)
  - (Season 4 Episode 16: "His Highness the Dog") (1967) as Mort Morton
  - (Season 7 Episode 13: "The Golden Spike Ceremony") (1969) as Mayor Potts
- 1967-1970: The Virginian (3 episodes)
  - (Season 6 Episode 7: "Ah Sing vs. Wyoming") (1967) as Chief Justice of the Supreme Court
  - (Season 7 Episode 10: "Dark Corridor") (1967) as Beaumont
  - (Season 9 Episode 13: "Hannah") (1970) as Doctor
- 1968: The Invaders (Season 2 Episode 19: "The Pit") as Art Llewellan
- 1968: Here's Lucy (Season 1 Episode 4: "Lucy and Miss Shelley Winters") as C. B. Wellborn
- 1968-1970: It Takes a Thief (2 episodes)
  - (Season 2 Episode 1: "One Night in Soledade") (1968) as Colonel Prentice
  - (Season 3 Episode 19: "Situation Red") (1970) as Flight Surgeon
- 1969: Trial Run (TV Movie)
- 1969: Hawaii Five-O (2 episodes) as Albert Woodson
  - (Season 1 Episode 19: "Once Upon a Time: Part 1")
  - (Season 1 Episode 20: "Once Upon a Time: Part 2")
- 1969: The Survivors (2 episodes) as Enroy
  - (Season 1 Episode 1: "Chapter One")
  - (Season 1 Episode 10: "Chapter Ten")
- 1969: The Mod Squad (Season 2 Episode 11: "The Healer") as Minister
- 1969-1972: Mannix (3 episodes)
  - (Season 2 Episode 16: "Shadow of a Man") (1969) as Bradshaw
  - (Season 5 Episode 17: "The Sound of Murder") (1972) as Alfred Price
  - (Season 6 Episode 8: "The Upside-Down Penny") (1972) as Lawrence Riley
- 1970: Green Acres (Season 5 Episode 17: "Bundle of Joy") as Mr. Robinson
- 1970: The Most Deadly Game (Season 1 Episode 4: "Breakdown") as J.B. Wilson
- 1970: The Bill Cosby Show (Season 2 Episode 12: "Swann's Way") as 2nd Salesman
- 1971-1976: Cannon (2 episodes)
  - (Season 1 Episode 1: "The Salinas Jackpot") (1971) as Hayden
  - (Season 5 Episode 18: "Revenge") (1976) as Colonel Ritchie
- 1974: Kung Fu (Season 2 Episode 21: "The Nature of Evil") as Max
- 1975: Lincoln (Season 1 Episode 2: "Sad Figure, Laughing") as Bewhiskered Senator
- 1975: The Odd Couple (Season 5 Episode 22: "Felix Remarries") as Minister
- 1978: The New Adventures of Heidi (TV Movie) as Oscar the Butler
- 1979–1982: Lou Grant (3 episodes)
  - (Season 3 Episode 8: "Witness") (1979) as Jacob Bauman
  - (Season 3 Episode 22: "Influence") (1980) as Dutch Van Deusen
  - (Season 5 Episode 18: "Law") (1982) as Jacob Bauman (final appearance)
