= Anton Leader =

American film director

Anton "Tony" Leader
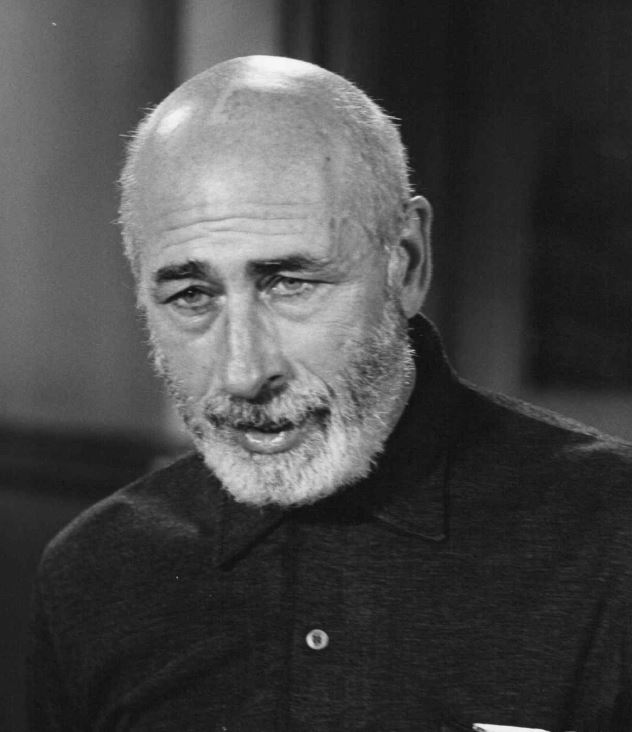
- Born: Anton Morris Leader; December 23, 1913; Boston, Massachusetts, U.S.
- Died: July 1, 1988 (aged 74); Los Angeles, California, U.S.
- Spouse: Rosalind Palca
- Children: 2, including Zachary

Anton Leader (December 23, 1913 – July 1, 1988) was an American radio and television director. He was born in Boston, Massachusetts, on December 23, 1913. He directed radio dramas in New York in the 1940s and moved to Los Angeles in 1948. Subsequently, he worked as a free-lancer for Universal Studios and Columbia Pictures, among others. From the mid-1950s to the mid-1970s, he directed many episodes of the popular television series of that era. Known as "Tony" to friends and colleagues, his screen credits alternated between "Tony Leader" and the more formal "Anton M. Leader." He died in Los Angeles, California, on July 1, 1988.

== Family ==
Leader was the son of Max Leader (1887–?) and Nettie Leader (née Winecor, 1897–1955). Leader was married to his wife, Rosalind née Palca, for 43 years. He was father to a son, Zachary and a daughter, Zoe.

== Years in radio ==
Leader directed multiple episodes of popular dramatic radio series of the 1940s, including Suspense, Murder at Midnight, Words at War, and others.

== Filmography, television and film director ==
Year	Title	# Episodes
1954	The Web	1
1955	The Man Behind the Badge	2
1955	Medic	1
1955	TV Reader's Digest	1
1955	Damon Runyon Theater	5
1955–56	Celebrity Playhouse	8
1956	The Millionaire	1
1956	Four Star Playhouse	2
1956	Playhouse 90	1
1956–57	Cavalcade of America	3
1955–57	The Ford Television Theater	14
1957	The Web	1
1957	The Adventures of McGraw	1
1957	The O. Henry Playhouse	1
1957–58	The Adventures of Jim Bowie	14
1958	Perry Mason	3
1958	Lawman	1
1959	Zane Grey Theater	1
1959	Schlitz Playhouse	1
1959	Sugarfoot	1
1959	Mr. Lucky	1
1959	Bold Venture	5
1958–60	Sea Hunt	4
1960	National Velvet	2
1960–61	The Brothers Brannagan	5
1960–61	The Twilight Zone	2
1961–62	Leave It to Beaver	2
1962	Father of the Bride	1
1962–63	Zero One	5
1964	Children of the Damned	Film
1964	Espionage	1
1961–65	Rawhide	4
1965	Lost in Space	2
1965	Laredo	1
1966	The Legend of Jesse James	1
1966	Daniel Boone	1
1965–66	Gilligan's Island	6
1966	It's About Time	1
1966	I Spy	1
1966–67	Tarzan	3
1967	Mr. Terrific	1
1967	The Road West	1
1967	Iron Horse	2
1968	Star Trek	1
1969	It Takes a Thief	1
1969	The Survivors	1
1967–69	Ironside	8
1970	Get Smart	2
1965–70	The Virginian	14
1970	Cockeyed Cowboys of Calico County	Film
1970–71	Hawaii 5-O	3
1972	Nichols	1
1976	Movin' On	1

== Filmography, producer ==
Year	Title	Notes
1953	It Happens Every Thursday	Film
