= Celebrity Playhouse =

- Genre: Drama Anthology
- Directed by: James Neilson; Arnold Laven; Gerald Freedman; James Sheldon
- Country of origin: United States
- Original language: English
- No. of seasons: 1
- No. of episodes: 39

Production
- Executive producer: William Sackheim
- Camera setup: Single-camera
- Running time: 25 mins.
- Production company: Screen Gems

Original release
- Network: Syndication
- Release: September 27, 1955 – June 19, 1956

Celebrity Playhouse is an American anthology series that aired on Syndication from September 1955, to June 1956.

Episodes were repeats of dramas that were originally shown on Schlitz Playhouse of Stars. Celebrity Playhouse was produced by Screen Gems.

== Recurring guest stars ==
| Actor | Appearances |
|---|---|
| Angela Lansbury | 2 episodes |
| Howard Duff | 2 episodes |
| Philip Carey | 2 episodes |
| Scott Brady | 2 episodes |
| Sylvia Sidney | 2 episodes |
| Jan Sterling | 2 episodes |
| William Bishop | 2 episodes |
| Ellen Drew | 2 episodes |
| Phyllis Kirk | 2 episodes |
| Gale Robbins | 2 episodes |
| Steve Brodie | 2 episodes |
| William Leslie | 2 episodes |
| Arthur Franz | 2 episodes |
| Michael Granger | 2 episodes |
| Robert Burton | 2 episodes |

== Other Notable Guest Stars ==
- Raymond Burr
- Dane Clark
- Joseph Cotten
- Wendell Corey
- Linda Darnell
- Laraine Day
- Joanne Dru
- Vince Edwards
- Jane Greer
- Paul Henreid
- Louis Jourdan
- Thomas Mitchell (actor)
- Hugh O'Brian
- Pat O'Brien (actor)
- Cliff Robertson
- Edward G. Robinson
- Ann Sheridan
- Gale Storm
- Teresa Wright

== Episodes ==
| No. | Title | Directed by | Written by | Original release date |
|---|---|---|---|---|
| 1 | "I Never Believed In Miracles" | Anton Leader | Story by : Reginald Denham and Mary Orr; Teleplay by : Jack Bennett | September 27, 1955 |
| 2 | "Day Of The Trial" | Fred F. Sears | Story by : John and Ward Hawkins; Teleplay by : Richard Carr | October 4, 1955 |
| 3 | "Showdown At San Pablo" | James Neilson | Story by : Al Dewlen; Teleplay by : John Dunkel and N.B. Stone Jr. | October 11, 1955 |
| 4 | "Mink Does Something For You" | Gerald Freedman | Story by : Louise Lee Outlaw; Teleplay by : Frederick Brady | October 18, 1955 |
| 5 | "A Very Big Man" | James Neilson | Story by : Don Tracy; Teleplay by : Hal Smith | October 25, 1955 |
| 6 | "A House Between Flags" | James Neilson | Story by : Montgomery Pittman; Teleplay by : Frederic Brady | November 1, 1955 |
| 7 | "For The Defense" | James Neilson | Donn Mullally | November 8, 1955 |
| 8 | "He Knew All About Women" | Gerald Freeman | Story by : Cliff Farrell; Teleplay by : Peter R. Brooke | November 15, 1955 |
| 9 | "Empty Arms" | James Neilson | Story by : May Edginton; Teleplay by : Gordon McDonnell and Willard Wiener | November 22, 1955 |
| 10 | "The Silver Saddle" | Arnold Laven | Story by : Thomas Thompson; Teleplay by : Clark E. Reynolds | November 29, 1955 |
| 11 | "Known But To God" | James Neilson | Don Martin | December 6, 1955 |
| 12 | "Diamonds In The Sky" | Gerald Freeman | Story by : John Clare; Teleplay by : Frederick Brady | December 13, 1955 |
| 13 | "The Hoax" | Gerald Freedman | Story by : Irving Wallace; Teleplay by : Irving Wallace and Lowell Barrington | December 20, 1955 |
| 14 | "Red Horse Hamber" | James Neilson | Story by : Dee Linford; Teleplay by : Frederick Brady | December 27, 1955 |
| 15 | "My Name Is Sally Roberts" | Anton Leader | Leonard Freeman and Jack Laird | January 3, 1956 |
| 16 | "Live Bait" | Lewis R. Foster | Story by : Richard Wormser; Teleplay by : Jack Laird | January 10, 1956 |
| 17 | "Secret Of The Bells" | Arnold Laven | Story by : Phyllis Lee Paterson; Teleplay by : Frederick Brady | January 17, 1956 |
| 18 | "The Twelve Year Secret" | Anton Leader | Story by : John D. Klorer; Teleplay by : Marion Thompson | January 24, 1956 |
| 19 | "Bachelor Husband" | Anton Leader | Story by : Ann St. John; Teleplay by : Frank Gill Jr. | January 31, 1956 |
| 20 | "Tantrum-Size 12" | Anton M. Leader | Story by : Vicki Baum; Teleplay by : Frederick Brady | February 7, 1956 |
| 21 | "They Flee By Night" | Anton Leader | Story by : Eve Green; Teleplay by : John Dunkel | February 14, 1956 |
| 22 | "The Foreigner" | Anton M. Leader | Story by : Charlotte Paul; Teleplay by : Rik Vollaerts | February 21, 1956 |
| 23 | "More Than Kin" | Gerald Freeman | Story by : John McGreevey; Teleplay by : John McGreevey | February 28, 1956 |
| 24 | "East Of Nowhere" | John Meredyth Lucas | Story by : Steve Fisher; Teleplay by : D.D. Beauchamp | March 6, 1956 |
| 25 | "The Go-Between" | Anton Leader | Thomas Nord Riley | March 13, 1956 |
| 26 | "Shadow Of A Thief" | James Sheldon | Story by : Isabelle Ziegler; Teleplay by : Gene Levitt and Robert Tallman | March 20, 1956 |
| 27 | "Home Is The Soldier" | James Sheldon | Story by : Steve Fisher; Teleplay by : Steve Fisher | March 27, 1956 |
| 28 | "Deborah" | Gerald Freedman | Story by : Margery Sharp; Teleplay by : DeWitt Bodeen | April 3, 1956 |
| 29 | "Tomorrow We May Part" | James Neilson | Story by : Laura Owen Miller; Teleplay by : Jack Laird and Marianne Moser | April 10, 1956 |
| 30 | "A Letter From The Past" | James Neilson | Story by : Violet Atkins; Teleplay by : DeWitt Bodeen | April 17, 1956 |
| 31 | "No Escape" | Gerald Freedman | Story by : Bruno Fischer; Teleplay by : Philip MacDonald | April 24, 1956 |
| 32 | "The Fleeting Years" | Daniel Dare | Story by : Rosamund Du Jardin; Teleplay by : DeWitt Bodeen | May 1, 1956 |
| 33 | "Stagecoach To Paradise" | Fred F. Sears | Story by : Tom Gwynne; Teleplay by : D.D. Beauchamp and Jack Laird | May 8, 1956 |
| 34 | "Incident In Rio" | James Sheldon | Story by : Frederick Nebel; Teleplay by : Lou Morheim | May 15, 1956 |
| 35 | "I'll Make The Arrest" | James Sheldon | Story by : Charles Beckman Jr. Teleplay by : Mort Thaw | May 22, 1956 |
| 36 | "Girl On The Run" | Sidney Miller | Story by : Paul Ernst; Teleplay by : Gene Wang | May 29, 1956 |
| 37 | "Faith" | James Sheldon | Story by : Audrey Ovington; Teleplay by : Peter Packer | June 5, 1956 |
| 38 | "Dark Legacy" | John Meredyth Lucas | Story by : William Hopson; Teleplay by : Frederick Brady | June 12, 1956 |
| 39 | "Girl At Large" | James Neilson | Merwin Gerard | June 19, 1956 |
