= Shadow Over Elveron =

- Based on: Shadow Over Elveron by Michael Kingsley
- Screenplay by: Chester Krumholz
- Directed by: James Goldstone
- Starring: James Franciscus; Shirley Knight; Leslie Nielsen; Franchot Tone; James Dunn; Don Ameche
- Country of origin: United States
- Original language: English

Production
- Producer: Jack Laird
- Production company: Universal City Studios

Original release
- Network: NBC
- Release: March 1968

Shadow Over Elveron is a 1968 television crime drama film directed by James Goldstone and starring James Franciscus, Shirley Knight, and Leslie Nielsen. It aired on NBC in March 1968. The story is based on the novel Shadow Over Elveron by Michael Kingsley.

== Cast ==
- James Franciscus as Dr. Matthew Tregaskis
- Shirley Knight as Joanne Tregaskis
- Leslie Nielsen as Sheriff Verne Drover
- Franchot Tone as Barney Conners
- James Dunn as Luke Travers
- Don Ameche as Justin Pettit

== Production ==
The film was produced by Jack Laird for Universal City Studios. The screenplay, based on the novel of the same name by Michael Kingsley, was adapted by Chester Krumholz. The film was directed by James Goldstone. Filming took place in 1966.

The lead role was regarded as a career resurgence for James Franciscus, who considered the project as more of a feature film than a television film.

== Critical reception ==
Critical reviews were mixed. The Baltimore Sun called the film "a thoroughly rotten, vicious film", citing its "greatly exaggerated" scenes of police brutality. It characterizes Sheriff Drover, played by Leslie Nielsen, as "Elveron's little Hitler" and decries the image of the United States that the film projects in the guise of a "typical" small town riddled by corruption. The San Francisco Examiner sums up the film as "sick", with its battle between Nielsen as "a repulsively delinquent sheriff" and James Franciscus as the "true, blue hero–dauntless, fearless, incorruptible, indestructible". The Boston Globe called the film "a hysterical, cheap melodrama".

The Los Angeles Times, in contrast, described the film as "a first-class motion picture by any standards". This review praised both the direction and acting, calling Franciscus' performance "sensitive and penetrating" and Nielsen's role "perhaps...the finest performance of his career"; the review also singled out Franchot Tone, Don Ameche, and Jill Banner for their work. According to the Herald & Review, Nielsen's portrayal of a corrupt small-town sheriff "steals the show", while Ameche is "a close second in his totally humorless role as the town's main financial factor".
