= Dean Smith (sprinter) =

American athlete and stuntman (1932–2023)

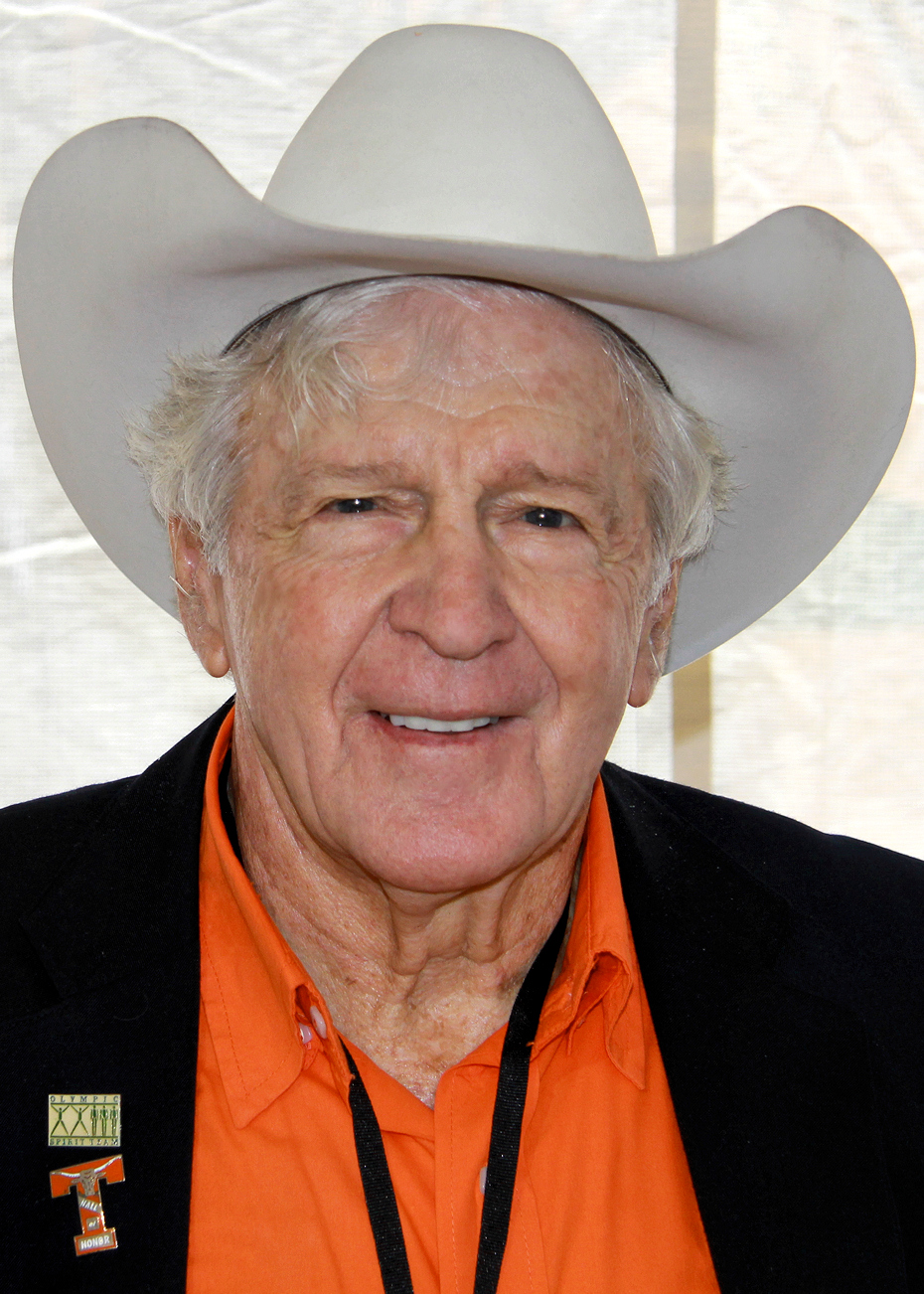
- Smith in 2013

Personal information
- Full name: Finis Dean Smith
- Born: January 15, 1932 Breckenridge, Texas, U.S.
- Died: June 24, 2023 (aged 91)
Medal record
Men's athletics
Representing the United States
Olympic Games
Gold medal – first place	1952 Helsinki	4 × 100 m relay

Finis Dean Smith (January 15, 1932 – June 24, 2023) was an American track and field athlete, winner of a gold medal in the 4 × 100 m relay at the 1952 Summer Olympics; he was also an actor and noted stuntman, appearing in many films and TV series.

== Early life, education, and sports career ==
Smith atop the podium at the 1952 Summer Olympics

Born in Breckenridge, Texas, Smith won the Amateur Athletic Union championships in 100 m in 1952. At the Helsinki Olympics, he was fourth in the 100 m and ran the leadoff leg for the American gold medal-winning 4 × 100 m relay team. As a sprinter on the Longhorn track team, Smith ran a 100-yard dash in 9.4 seconds, one-tenth of a second off the world record at the time.

After graduating from University of Texas at Austin where he ran track and was a member of the Silver Spurs, Smith played professional football for the Los Angeles Rams and the Pittsburgh Steelers ahead of his career in Hollywood.

=== Later sports career ===
Later on, Smith competed in amateur rodeo. His events were bareback bronc riding and calf roping. He won championships in both events. The Professional Rodeo Cowboys Association made him an honorary member. He also participated in the team roping event in Reba McEntire's Pro Celebrity Rodeo in May 1997.

== After sports/Hollywood career ==
Following his sports career, Smith performed as a professional rodeo cowboy and stuntman in various Western movies, such as The Alamo, The Comancheros, How The West Was Won, McLintock!, Rio Conchos, Big Jake, El Dorado, and Rio Lobo. He also appeared in such Western TV shows as Tales of Wells Fargo, Maverick, Gunsmoke, Lawman, Have Gun Will Travel, The Iron Horse, and Walker, Texas Ranger.

Some of what Variety called his "most impressive" stunts included falling out of a two-story building into a hay wagon in McLintock! (1963) starring Maureen O'Hara. Smith was noticed by famed director John Ford when working on the 1958 Rosalind Russell project, Auntie Mame, and as a result went on to be featured in many of Ford's subsequent films.

== Honors ==
In 2006, he was inducted into the Texas Rodeo Cowboy Hall of Fame. In 2009, he was inducted into the National Multicultural Western Heritage Museum and Hall of Fame. He is also a member of the Texas Track and Field Coaches Association Hall of Fame. Smith is a member of the Hollywood Stuntman's Hall of Fame. In 1997, he was named "All American Cowboy", and in 1998, he received a Golden Boot Award. In 2007, he received the Silver Spur award for his contributions as a stuntman in the film business.

== Personal life ==
Smith died on June 24, 2023, at age 91.
