= The Bride in Black =

- Written by: Claire Labine
- Story by: Claire Labine; Jack Laird
- Directed by: James Goldstone
- Starring: Susan Lucci; David Soul; Reginald VelJohnson
- Theme music composer: Joseph Conlan
- Country of origin: United States
- Original language: English

Production
- Producer: Brooke Kennedy
- Cinematography: Ronald Víctor García
- Editor: Susan B. Browdy
- Running time: 120 minutes
- Production companies: Echo Films Services; Panavision, Ltd.

Original release
- Network: ABC
- Release: October 21, 1990

The Bride in Black is a 1990 American television film directed by James Goldstone and starring Susan Lucci, David Soul and Reginald VelJohnson. The ABC Sunday Night Movie aired 9:00 to 11:00 p.m. on October 21, 1990.

== Plot ==
Rose D'Amore falls for Owen Malloy; they quickly marry, and Owen is gunned down on steps of the church as the newlyweds leave the church. Rose travels around to learn more about her deceased husband, whose real name is Johnny McGuire and was a boxer/sculptor. Owen was an art forger, creating Greek art.

== Cast ==
- Susan Lucci as Rose D`Amore
- David Soul as Owen Malloy/Johnny McGuire
- Reginald VelJohnson as Barry Gates
- Finola Hughes as Cybil Cobb
- Melissa Leo as Mary Margaret
- Tony Todd as 747 Green
- Bob Gunton as Sydney
- Stephen Liska as Nick Borsokov

== Production ==
The film was shot in Pittsburgh.

== Reception ==
Ken Tucker of Entertainment Weekly graded the film a D.
