= William Bramley =

American actor (1928–1985)

- Bramley in Laredo (1967)
- Born: April 18, 1928; New York City, U.S.
- Died: October 28, 1985 (aged 57); Los Angeles, California, U.S.
- Education: Bucknell University
- Occupation: Actor
- Years active: 1958–1984

William Bramley (April 18, 1928 – October 28, 1985) was an American actor.

== Biography ==
Born in New York, New York, Bramley graduated from Bucknell University in 1953. While there, he was involved with the Cap and Dagger Club theatrical organization.

Bramley made his film debut in the Academy Award-winning 1961 movie musical West Side Story, co-directed by Robert Wise and co-starring Richard Beymer. Bramley played the role of policeman Officer Krupke. He also appeared in the 1968 film Madigan. Other film credits include Gunpoint (1966), I Love You, Alice B. Toklas (1968), Getting Straight (1970), Suppose They Gave a War and Nobody Came? (1970), Doctors' Wives (1971), Bless the Beasts & Children (1971), Hangup (1974), Revenge of the Cheerleaders (1976), and The Wild Life (1984).

He appeared in TV movies including Ready for the People (1964), Trial Run (1969), Michael O'Hara the Fourth (1972), The Last Day (1975), Tough Girl (1981).

Bramley played a number of characters in various TV series including the lead policeman in the second-season episode of the TV series Star Trek entitled "Bread and Circuses". Bramley made guest appearances on such TV series as Gunsmoke, Bonanza, Combat!, Straightaway, Kentucky Jones, Lassie (1969 episode "Patsy"),The Virginian, Bewitched, I Dream of Jeannie (as a policeman), Emergency!, McCloud, Gomer Pyle, and Barnaby Jones. His final television appearance was in an episode of St. Elsewhere.

Bramley died on October 28, 1985, in the Tarzana Medical Center in Tarzana, California, at the age of 57.

== Filmography ==
=== Film ===
| Year | Title | Role | Notes |
|---|---|---|---|
| 1961 | West Side Story | Krupke | |
| 1963 | The Thrill of It All | Angry Driver | |
| 1968 | Madigan | O'Brien | Uncredited |
| 1968 | I Love You, Alice B. Toklas! | 1st Patrolman | |
| 1970 | Getting Straight | Wade Linden | |
| 1970 | Suppose They Gave a War and Nobody Came | Deputy Henry | |
| 1971 | Doctors' Wives | Dr. Hagstrom | |
| 1971 | Bless the Beasts & Children | Mr. Goodenow | |
| 1974 | Hangup | Simpson | |
| 1974 | Freebie and the Bean | Mr. Franklin | Uncredited |
| 1976 | Revenge of the Cheerleaders | Walter Hartlander | |
| 1984 | The Wild Life | Security Officer | Final film role |

=== Television ===
| Year | Title | Role | Notes |
|---|---|---|---|
| 1955 | Pond's Theater | | Season 2 Episode 20: "Prologue to Glory" |
| 1958 | The Phil Silvers Show | Private Pete Masters | Season 4 Episode 3: "Bilko's Deluxe Tours" (uncredited) |
| 1959 | The Phil Silvers Show | Private Pete Masters | Season 4 Episode 22: "Bilko's Sharpshooter" |
| 1960 | Diagnosis: Unknown | Detective McClutchey | Season 1 Episode 1: "The Case of the Radiant Wine" (uncredited) |
| 1961 | The Aquanauts | Mr. Wesson | Season 1 Episode 19: "The Defective Tank Adventure" |
| 1961 | The Detectives | Range Manager | Season 2 Episode 32: "Other Cheek" |
| 1961 | Checkmate | Burke | Season 2 Episode 2: "The Button Down Break" |
| 1962 | Straightaway | | Season 1 Episode 19: "Escape from Darkness" |
| 1962 | Alfred Hitchcock Presents | Dr. Hagerty | Season 7 Episode 20: "The Test" |
| 1962 | Alcoa Premiere | Bosun Ward Gallagher | Season 1 Episode 20: "Seven Against the Sea" |
| 1962 | The Tall Man | Bart Tugwell | Season 2 Episode 34: "The Runaway Groom" |
| 1962 | The Untouchables | Stephen Millerick | Season 4 Episode 8: "Elegy" |
| 1962 | Laramie | Hanson | Season 4 Episode 1: "Among the Missing" |
| 1962 | The Alfred Hitchcock Hour | Lieutenant McDonald | Season 1 Episode 14: "The Tender Poisoner" |
| 1962 | Bonanza | Townsend | Season 3 Episode 32: "The Long Night" |
| 1962 | Gunsmoke | Browder | Season 7 Episode 20: "Half Straight" |
| 1962 | Gunsmoke | Davis Henry | Season 8 Episode 6: "Collie's Free" |
| 1963 | Laramie | Sheriff Tulman | Season 4 Episode 21: "The Renegade Brand" |
| 1963 | The Dakotas | Jellicoe | Season 1 Episode 3: "Mutiny at Fort Mercy" |
| 1963 | G.E. True | Frank Joseph | Season 1 Episode 17: "Firebug" |
| 1963 | Wide Country | Mike Knudsen | Season 1 Episode 28: "The Care and Handling of Tigers" |
| 1963 | Empire | Marty Albee | Season 1 Episode 32: "The Convention" |
| 1963 | Breaking Point | Lloyd | Season 1 Episode 6: "The Bull Roarer" |
| 1963 | Temple Houston | Ford Conley | Season 1 Episode 8: "Jubilee" |
| 1963 | Kraft Suspense Theatre | District Attorney | Season 1 Episode 4: "A Hero for Our Times" |
| 1963 | The Virginian | Charlie Tressider | Season 2 Episode 2: "To Make This Place Remember" |
| 1964 | Kraft Suspense Theatre | Roy David 'Biff' Mueller | Season 2 Episode 6: "The Jack Is High" |
| 1964 | Temple Houston | Gus Finney | Season 1 Episode 24: "Do Unto Others, Then Gallop" |
| 1964 | The Alfred Hitchcock Hour | Fred Starcher | Season 3 Episode 1: "The Return of Verge Likens" |
| 1964 | 77 Sunset Strip | Bridges | Season 6 Episode 19: "Dead as in 'Dude'" |
| 1964 | The Farmer's Daughter | Desk Sergeant | Season 1 Episode 25: "Katy Gets Arrested" |
| 1964 | The Donna Reed Show | Harvey Jay | Season 6 Episode 31: "My Son the Catcher" |
| 1964 | Destry | Red Brady | Season 1 Episode 11: "Red Brady's Kid" |
| 1964 | The Bing Crosby Show | 1st Officer | Season 1 Episode 4: "The Green Couch" |
| 1964 | Ready for the People | Nick Williams | TV movie |
| 1964 | Tom, Dick, and Mary | Sergeant | Season 1 Episode 10: "And Baby Makes Four" |
| 1964 | Wendy and Me | Policeman | Season 1 Episode 15: "Wendy, the Woman in the Gray Flannel Suit" |
| 1964 | Lassie | Chet McCabe | Season 11 Episode 8: "Lassie and the Loner" |
| 1965 | The Virginian | John Ferguson | Season 3 Episode 25: "Timberland" |
| 1965 | The Outer Limits | 'Baldy' Baldwin | Season 2 Episode 16: "The Premonition" |
| 1965 | Hazel | Mr. Camden | Season 4 Episode 21: "Stop Rockin' Our Reception" |
| 1965 | Death Valley Days | McCartney | Season 13 Episode 20: "The Battle of San Francisco Bay" |
| 1965 | Kentucky Jones | Cal Dryer | Season 1 Episode 23: "Most Precious Gold" |
| 1965 | Slattery's People | Beecher | Season 2 Episode 1: "A Sitting Duck Named Slattery" |
| 1965 | Honey West | George Mortimer | Season 1 Episode 2: "The Owl and the Eye" |
| 1965 | Dr. Kildare | Dr. Bernard Krantz | Season 5 Episode 7: "Some Doors Are Slamming" |
| 1965 | Dr. Kildare | Dr. Bernard Krantz | Season 5 Episode 8: "Enough La Boheme for Everybody" |
| 1965 | Lost in Space | Mr. Nobody | Season 1 Episode 7: "My Friend, Mr. Nobody" (uncredited) |
| 1966 | Lost in Space | Robotoid (voice) | Season 1 Episode 20: "War of the Robots" (uncredited) |
| 1966 | Gunsmoke | Jed Woodard | Season 11 Episode 21: "My Father's Guitar" |
| 1966 | Gunsmoke | Jake Struck | Season 12 Episode 2: "The Goldtakers" |
| 1966 | The Wackiest Ship in the Army | | Season 1 Episode 26: "Chinese Checkers" |
| 1966 | Perry Mason | Leon Vandenberg | Season 9 Episode 29: "The Case of the Crafty Kidnapper" |
| 1966 | The Fugitive | Tim Oates | Season 3 Episode 27: "The 2130" (credited as Bill Bramley) |
| 1966 | The Fugitive | Lynch | Season 4 Episode 3: "A Clean and Quiet Town" (credited as Bill Bramley) |
| 1966 | The Girl from U.N.C.L.E. | Ingo | Season 1 Episode 7: "The Danish Blue Affair" |
| 1966 | Gomer Pyle: USMC | Cop #2 | Season 3 Episode 12: "Follow That Car" |
| 1966 | Combat! | Desk Sergeant | Season 5 Episode 12: "Gulliver" |
| 1966 | 12 O'Clock High | Colonel Farnum | Season 3 Episode 14: "The Duel at Mont Sainte Marie" |
| 1966 | Bewitched | Mr. Mills | Season 3 Episode 16: "Soapbox Derby" |
| 1966 | Iron Horse | Ferris | Season 1 Episode 15: "A Dozen Ways to Kill a Man" |
| 1966 | The F.B.I. | Ray Scott | Season 1 Episode 19: "Special Delivery" |
| 1966 | The F.B.I. | Steve Drake | Season 2 Episode 2: "The Escape" |
| 1967 | Gunsmoke | Adam Haley | Season 12 Episode 25: "The Favor" |
| 1967 | Gunsmoke | Turner | Season 13 Episode 9: "The Pillagers" |
| 1967 | The Virginian | Del Hobart | Season 5 Episode 15: "Vengeance Trail" |
| 1967 | Iron Horse | Sheriff Stevenson | Season 2 Episode 15: "Death Has Two Faces" |
| 1967 | Laredo | Luke Bergstrom | Season 2 Episode 15: "The Seventh Day" |
| 1967 | The Invaders | Constable Gabbard | Season 1 Episode 6: "Nightmare" |
| 1967 | The Monkees | Larry | Season 1 Episode 27: "Monkee Mother" |
| 1967 | The Road West | Anderson | Season 1 Episode 26: "The Eighty-Seven Dollar Bride" |
| 1967 | Cimarron Strip | Whiskey Jack | Season 1 Episode 1: "Journey to a Hanging" |
| 1967 | That Girl | Tim | Season 2 Episode 15: "'Twas the Night Before Christmas, You're Under Arrest" (credited as Bill Bramley) |
| 1967 | The Magical World of Disney | Oscar Gruber | Season 13 Episode 22: "Atta Girl, Kelly! Dog of Destiny" |
| 1968 | Adam-12 | Cullen | Season 1 Episode 4: "Reed, the Dicks Have Their Job and We Have Ours" |
| 1968 | Gunsmoke | Miller | Season 14 Episode 10: "The Miracle Man" |
| 1968 | The Virginian | Arnold Bowden | Season 6 Episode 24: "The Handy Man" |
| 1968 | The Virginian | Karnes | Season 7 Episode 13: "Big Tiny" |
| 1968 | Cimarron Strip | Fargo Jones | Season 1 Episode 16: "Fool's Gold" |
| 1968 | Lassie | Police Officer | Season 15 Episode 3: "The Holocaust: Part 1" |
| 1968 | Lassie | Police Officer | Season 15 Episode 4: "The Holocaust: Part 2" |
| 1968 | Star Trek: The Original Series | Policeman | Season 2 Episode 25: "Bread and Circuses" |
| 1968 | The Ugliest Girl in Town | Car Salesman | Season 1 Episode 1: "The Ugliest Girl in Town" |
| 1968 | Land of the Giants | 1st Giant | Season 1 Episode 6: "The Flight Plan" |
| 1968 | Adam-12 | Mr. Cullen | Season 1 Episode 4: "Log 131: Reed, the Dicks Have Their Jobs, and We Have Theirs" |
| 1968 | Lassie | Mr. Munson | Season 16 Episode 3: "Patsy" |
| 1969 | Gunsmoke | Cane | Season 14 Episode 26: "Exodus 21.22" |
| 1969 | The F.B.I. | Howard Spain | Season 5 Episode 12: "The Inside Man" |
| 1969 | Land of the Giants | P.G. Hanley | Season 2 Episode 6: "Giants and All That Jazz" |
| 1969 | That Girl | Bert Weevle | Season 3 Episode 24: "It's So Nice to Have a Mouse Around the House" (credited as Bill Bramley) |
| 1969 | The Outcasts | Stretter | Season 1 Episode 12: "They Shall Rise Up" |
| 1969 | Trial Run | Karlson | TV movie |
| 1969 | I Dream of Jeannie | Policeman | Season 4 Episode 21: "Jeannie for the Defense" |
| 1969 | Love, American Style | Policeman | Season 1 Episode 3: "Love and the Phone Booth" |
| 1969 | My World and Welcome to It | Beeman | Season 1 Episode 14: "Rally Round the Flag" |
| 1969 | The Last of the Powerseekers | Sergeant Grady | TV movie |
| 1969 | Ironside | Joe Lorca | Season 2 Episode 18: "The Prophecy" |
| 1970 | Ironside | Ken Hansen | Season 3 Episode 25: "Tom Dayton Is Loose Among Us" |
| 1970 | Julia | Stanley Maguire | Season 2 Episode 15: "The Prisoner of Brenda" |
| 1970 | Nanny and the Professor | Deliveryman #1 | Season 1 Episode 6: "Spring, Sweet Spring" |
| 1970 | Room 222 | Coach Windish | Season 2 Episode 4: "Adam's Lib" |
| 1971 | Room 222 | Mr. Windisch | Season 2 Episode 23: "You Can Take the Boy Out of the Country, But ..." |
| 1971 | Gunsmoke | Anderson | Season 17 Episode 8: "Lynott" |
| 1971 | The F.B.I. | Foreman | Season 7 Episode 9: "The Game of Terror" |
| 1971 | The Name of the Game | Paul / Deputy | Season 3 Episode 24: "The Showdown" |
| 1971 | Bearcats! | Mr. Overton | Season 1 Episode 4: "The Feathered Serpent" |
| 1971 | Nichols | Hemmings | Season 1 Episode 6: "Deer Crossing" |
| 1971 | Mod Squad | Artie Ralston | Season 4 Episode 12: "Real Loser" (uncredited) |
| 1971 | Cannon | Lieutenant Egan | Season 1 Episode 12: "Death Is a Double-Cross" |
| 1971 | McMillan & Wife | Sergeant Warthheimer | Season 1 Episode 1: "Murder by the Barrel" |
| 1971 | Bonanza | Gifford Owens | Season 12 Episode 14: "For a Young Lady" |
| 1972 | Bonanza | Dan Fowler | Season 13 Episode 26: "One Ace Too Many" |
| 1972 | Bonanza | Harlan Moeller | Season 14 Episode 3: "The Initiation" |
| 1972 | McMillan & Wife | Whitey | Season 2 Episode 3: "Cop of the Year" |
| 1972 | The Magical World of Disney | Police Commissioner | Season 18 Episode 17: "Michael O'Hara the Fourth: Part 1" |
| 1972 | The Magical World of Disney | Police Commissioner | Season 18 Episode 18: "Michael O'Hara the Fourth: Part 2" |
| 1972 | O'Hara, U.S. Treasury | Grover Potter | Season 1 Episode 18: "Operation: Dorias" |
| 1972 | Longstreet | Leonard Ames | Season 1 Episode 22: "Through Shattering Glass" |
| 1972 | Michael O'Hara the Fourth | Police Commissioner | TV movie |
| 1972 | Emergency! | Sam | Season 1 Episode 11: "Crash" |
| 1972 | The Delphi Bureau | Dr. Kantor | Season 1 Episode 3: "The White Plague Project" |
| 1973 | Gunsmoke | Loomis | Season 18 Episode 20: "Whelan's Men" |
| 1973 | Ironside | Bert Martin | Season 6 Episode 14: "Ollinger's Last Case" |
| 1973 | The F.B.I. | Kurt Milkey | Season 8 Episode 20: "The Double Play" |
| 1973 | The Waltons | Matt Beckwith | Season 1 Episode 19: "The Gypsies" |
| 1973 | McCloud | Detective Sergeant Reese | Season 4 Episode 2: "The Solid Gold Swingers" |
| 1973 | The Streets of San Francisco | Officer Pete Morgan | Season 1 Episode 25: "The Unicorn" |
| 1973 | Barnaby Jones | Mike | Season 2 Episode 2: "Death Leap" |
| 1974 | Ironside | Brooks | Season 7 Episode 15: "Once More for Joey" |
| 1974 | The Streets of San Francisco | Parole Board Chief | Season 2 Episode 19: "A String of Puppets" |
| 1974 | The Streets of San Francisco | John Condon | Season 3 Episode 3: "Target: Red" |
| 1974 | Adam-12 | Fred Culligan | Season 7 Episode 3: "Teamwork" |
| 1974 | Get Christie Love! | Bartender | Season 1 Episode 4: "Pawn Ticket for Murder" |
| 1974 | Petrocelli | Milt Daniels | Season 1 Episode 8: "Mirror, Mirror on the Wall ..." |
| 1975 | Petrocelli | Cyrus Mitchell | Season 1 Episode 18: "The Outsiders" |
| 1975 | Ironside | Paul Pacheco | Season 8 Episode 18: "The Rolling Y" |
| 1975 | The Streets of San Francisco | Condon | Season 3 Episode 23: "Solitaire" |
| 1975 | Barnaby Jones | Sheriff Lunceford | Season 3 Episode 24: "Bond of Fear" |
| 1975 | The Last Day | Oates | TV movie |
| 1975 | Barbary Coast | Hatch | Season 1 Episode 1: "Funny Money" |
| 1976 | Barnaby Jones | Sheriff Martin Perry | Season 5 Episode 7: "Voice in the Night" |
| 1979 | How the West Was Won | Ferryman | Season 3 Episode 5: "Hillary" |
| 1981 | Little House on the Prairie | Jed Finley | Season 7 Episode 19: "Blind Justice" |
| 1981 | ABC Afterschool Specials | Judge M.A. Dibella | Season 10 Episode 3: "Tough Girl" |
| 1982 | The Dukes of Hazzard | Boss Bowman | Season 5 Episode 5: "The Hazzardgate Tape" |
| 1983 | St. Elsewhere | Mr. Czeski | Season 2 Episode 4: "Qui Transtulit Sustinet" |
