= See How They Run (1964 film) =

1964 American TV film

- Written by: Michael Blankfort
- Directed by: David Lowell Rich
- Starring: John Forsythe; Senta Berger; Jane Wyatt; Pamela Franklin; Franchot Tone; Leslie Nielsen
- Music by: Lalo Schifrin
- Country of origin: United States
- Original language: English

Production
- Producer: Jack Laird
- Cinematography: Lionel Lindon
- Editor: George Jay Nicholson
- Running time: 100 minutes

Original release
- Network: NBC
- Release: October 7, 1964

See How They Run is a 1964 American made-for-television drama film broadcast on NBC. It is generally regarded as the first made-for-television film.

== Premise ==
Three orphans head for the United States, unknowingly carrying important evidence pointing to the existence of a corrupt international cartel that has just murdered their father. The cartel is desperate to retrieve the evidence.

== Cast ==
- John Forsythe as Martin Young
- Senta Berger as Orlando Miller
- Jane Wyatt as Augusta Flanders
- Pamela Franklin as Tirza Green
- Franchot Tone as Baron Frood
- Leslie Nielsen as Elliott Green
- George Kennedy as Rudy
- Jami Fields as Maggie Green
- Jackie Jones as Jamsey Green
- Harlan Warde as Manley
