= Jules Goldstone =

American lawyer

Jules Conrad Goldstone (February 12, 1900 – June 18, 1980) was an entertainment attorney who took part in the early Hollywood antitrust suits.

Born to a Jewish family, Goldstone was a native of Schenectady, NY. He attended the University of Michigan Law School. Goldstone was an early Hollywood agent, representing Elizabeth Taylor, director Clarence Brown, and James Thurber, among others.

With his brothers, Charles and Nat Goldstone, he founded one of the earliest boutique Hollywood talent agencies (later the Goldstone & Tobias Agency).

Goldstone was the father of the film and television director James Goldstone. He died in 1980.
