= David Sheiner =

American actor (1928–2026)

- Sheiner in Diana, 1973
- Born: Saul David Sheiner; January 13, 1928; New York City, U.S.
- Died: June 5, 2026 (aged 98); Los Angeles, California, U.S.
- Occupation: Actor
- Years active: 1950–1988
- Spouse: Mary-David Sheiner (m. 1968)
- Children: 2

Saul David Sheiner (January 13, 1928 – June 5, 2026) was an American actor. He appeared on Broadway, but is best known for his supporting roles in several films and television series. He started his career in television in 1952, but he was most successful from the 1960s through the 1980s.

== Life and career ==
Sheiner appeared in several films including The Greatest Story Ever Told (1965) as James the Elder, They Call Me Mister Tibbs! (1970) and Blue Thunder (1983). He is probably best known for his supporting role as Roy, Oscar's accountant and poker playing crony opposite Jack Lemmon and Walter Matthau in the film adaptation of The Odd Couple (1968). Sheiner also featured prominently in the 1973 Michael Winner/Charles Bronson action movie "The Stone Killer".

He also guest-starred in many television programs. Sheiner appeared on two episodes of Combat!, as Captain Ridell in the third season episode "The Steeple" (1965) and as SS Major Krieghoffen in the fifth season episode "Gadjo" (1967). He also played roles on several other popular shows such as Columbo, The Big Valley, The Twilight Zone, A Man Called Shenandoah, The Invaders, Voyage to the Bottom of the Sea, The Man from U.N.C.L.E., Cannon, Hawaii Five-O, Blue Light, S.W.A.T., Quincy, M.E., Mission: Impossible, The Fall Guy, Vega$, Blind Ambition, Planet of the Apes, Bonanza, and The Fugitive. He retired from acting in 1988. He appeared in the episodes "Once Upon a Time" (2 parts) in Hawaii Five-O.

Sheiner died from renal failure in Los Angeles on June 5, 2026, at the age of 98.

== Filmography ==
Year	Title	Role	Notes
1958	The Mugger	Sidney	Uncredited
1965	Combat!	Captain Ridell	Episode: "The Steeple"
1965	The Greatest Story Ever Told	James the Elder	
1966	Voyage to the Bottom of the Sea	Chandler	
1966	One Spy Too Many	Parviz	
1966	The Big Valley	Capt. Jonathan Rizely	and 2 unrelated characters in other episodes
1967	Combat!	SS Colonel Karl Hoffen	Episode: "Gadjo"
1967	Scalplock	Johnny Carson	
1967	Mission: Impossible	Andreas Solowiechek	
1968	A Man Called Gannon	Sheriff Polaski	
1968	The Odd Couple	Roy	
1969	Winning	Crawford	
1969	Hawaii Five-O	Frank Zipser	Episodes: "Once Upon a Time" (2 parts)
1969	Mission: Impossible	Colonel Ziegler/Dr. Karl Turek	4 episodes
1970	Mission: Impossible	James Reed	
1970	Halls of Anger	Mr. Perkins	Uncredited
1970	Mannix	Sam	Episode: "One for the Lady"
1970	They Call Me Mister Tibbs!	Lieutenant Kenner	
1970	The Virginian	Cully	Episode: "No War for the Warrior"
1971	Gunsmoke	Preacher	Episodes: "Waste" (2 parts)
1971	Sarge	Lloyd Hammond	Episode: "A Bad Case of Monogamy"
1973	The Stone Killer	Guido Lorenz	
1974	Planet of the Apes	Dr Zoran	Episode: "The Cure"
1974	Skyway to Death	Bill Carter	ABC Movie of the Week
1975	S.W.A.T.	Eric	Episode: "Death Carrier"
1976	Victory at Entebbe	Aaron Olav	TV movie
1978	Six Million Dollar Man	Arnold	
1980	The Gong Show Movie	Dr. Jerry Queasley	
1980	The Big Brawl	Morgan	
1983	Blue Thunder	Fletcher	
