= James Goldstone =

American film and television director

- Born: June 8, 1931; Los Angeles, California, U.S.
- Died: November 5, 1999 (aged 68); Shaftsbury, Vermont, U.S.
- Occupations: Film and television director
- Father: Jules Goldstone

James Goldstone (June 8, 1931 – November 5, 1999) was an American film and television director whose career spanned over thirty years.

== Early life and education ==
Goldstone was born in Los Angeles, the son of the Hollywood agent and early television producer Jules Goldstone (1900–1980) and Anita Miriam Goldstone (née Rosenberg, 1907–2002). He graduated from Dartmouth College in Hanover, New Hampshire before receiving his master's degree from Bennington College.

== Career ==
Goldstone was noted for the momentum and "fifteen-minute cliffhangers" that he brought to TV pilots such as Star Trek ("Where No Man Has Gone Before", 1966), Ironside, and The Bold Ones: The Senator. His later career helped pioneer the concept of "thirty-second attention span" pacing over detailed content in his dramatizations of Rita Hayworth, Calamity Jane, and the Kent State shootings for which he won the Emmy. He directed several feature films, including the large-scale suspense Rollercoaster (1977).

During his Hollywood career, he directed Paul Newman, Robert De Niro, George Segal, Robert Shaw, James Garner, Richard Dreyfuss and Sidney Poitier and collaborated with composer and musician, Lalo Schifrin. He "discovered" Tiny Tim. In addition to his work in film and television, Goldstone was a longtime leader in the Director's and Writers Guilds. In his later life, he taught both at Bennington College and in the masters program at Columbia University. During the 1990s he directed a number of theatrical productions in New England. He was also central in the establishment of National Public Radio presence in Vermont and was the moving force behind the creation of the Vermont Arts Council which named its award for new talent the James Goldstone Award.

Goldstone died of cancer at his home in Shaftsbury, Vermont in 1999.

== Partial filmography ==
- The Outer Limits ("The Sixth Finger", TV, 1963, and "The Inheritors", TV, 1964)
- Star Trek ("Where No Man Has Gone Before", "What Are Little Girls Made Of?", TV, 1966)
- A Man Called Gannon (1968)
- Jigsaw (1968)
- Shadow Over Elveron (1968)
- Winning (1969)
- Brother John (1971)
- Red Sky at Morning (1971)
- The Gang That Couldn't Shoot Straight (1971)
- They Only Kill Their Masters (1972)
- Eric (1975)
- Swashbuckler (1976)
- Rollercoaster (1977)
- When Time Ran Out... (1980)
- Kent State (1981)
- Charles & Diana: A Royal Love Story (1982)
- Rita Hayworth: The Love Goddess (1983)
- Calamity Jane (1984)
- The Sun Also Rises (1984)
- Dreams of Gold: The Mel Fisher Story (1986)
- Earth Star Voyager (1988)
- The Bride in Black (1990)
