= The Brothers Brannagan =

Television series

- Genre: Detective fiction
- Created by: Wilbur Stark; Jerry Layton
- Starring: Stephen Dunne; Mark Roberts
- Theme music composer: Alexander Courage
- Composer: Leon Klatzkin
- Country of origin: United States
- Original language: English
- No. of seasons: 1
- No. of episodes: 39

Production
- Producers: Wilbur Stark; Jerry Layton
- Cinematography: Frank Carson
- Editor: John M. Woodcock
- Camera setup: Single-camera
- Running time: 22–24 minutes
- Production company: Brad-Jacey Productions for CBS Films

Original release
- Network: Syndication
- Release: September 14, 1960 – October 2, 1965

The Brothers Brannagan is an American detective television series that aired in syndication from September 14, 1960, to October 2, 1965.

== Premise ==
Mike Brannagan (Steve Dunne) and Bob Brannagan (Mark Roberts) are brothers from San Francisco, who now run a private detective agency out of the Mountain Shadows Resort (Note: This is a real resort, which opened in January 1959, and according to its website still retains some of the original buildings from when the television series was made.) in Paradise Valley, Arizona. Mike is a smooth-talker, who carries a little notebook filled with erudite quotes for any situation involving women. Bob is more serious, an action guy prone to taking risks in tight situations. They are the only two series regulars; character actors Barney Phillips and Paul Bryar had occasional recurring roles as police lieutenants. Each episode had a unique opening that began with a long shot of the brothers walking side by side away from the viewer while the theme song plays. A male voice shouts "Hey Brannagan!", at which the brothers pause to face the viewer and say "Which one?".

Producer Wilbur Stark told columnist Steven H. Scheuer the show was "romantic adventure" and emulated the escapism of then current hits Adventures in Paradise and Hawaiian Eye. Stark also mentioned the show's writers followed an outline made up by actors Roberts and Dunne, giving the characters' backstory including their San Francisco origin.

== Production ==
Wilbur Stark and Jerry Layton had previously co-produced the Colonel Humphrey Flack television series before creating The Brothers Brannagan. They formed the Brad-Jacey production company for this venture, with funding from CBS Films which would hold the copyright. The Arizona Republic reported in July 1959 that filming for a pilot episode of The Brothers Brannagan would start August 11, 1959. The detective show would be the first national television program made and set in the Phoenix area. Columnist Jack Curtis confirmed shooting began as scheduled. He also reported filming that week centered on the Mountain Shadows Resort and the Squaw Peak Inn, while The Arizona Republic ran a photo of stars Roberts and Dunne at location shooting outside the First National Bank on Central Avenue in Phoenix.

After filming the pilot episode, the production company left Arizona and did not return until late November 1959, when the producers put out an open casting call for extras. Casting director Ruth Scott said 375 people applied for extra jobs during the single day call, with at least one hired for a speaking role as well. A local couple, hired to do location makeup and hairstyling, reported they worked in trailers and other vehicles leased from MGM. After location work wrapped up in February 1960, the production company returned to Southern California where interior shooting was done at the MGM studios.

By April 1960 columnist Eve Starr reported that CBS Films had 16 completed episodes on hand, but The Brothers Brannagan might appear as a syndicated show in the fall since it did not yet have a network sponsor. The producers, instead of creating 13 shows and waiting for a buyer as was typical, had made a full season of 39 episodes.

== Reception ==
Harry Harris, writing in The Philadelphia Inquirer, said the first episode was full of action and "also contained some almost incredibly inept writing". Harris opined that "Steve Dunne and Mark Roberts, between them, add up to Mike Hammer".

== Viewing history ==
=== Broadcast ===
The first episode broadcast was on Wednesday, September 14, 1960, at 10:30 pm, by WRCV-TV Channel 3 in Philadelphia. It aired in Syracuse, New York the following day at 7:00 pm on WHEN-TV Channel 8. The broadcasts by these first two stations were sponsored by Acme Markets.

WRCV-TV completed its first run showing of all thirty-nine episodes on June 21, 1961. KMOX-TV in St. Louis broadcast the syndicated series through October 2, 1965.

At least one episode of the series was shown in September 1975 on KGUN-TV in Tucson, Arizona.

=== Cable ===
The Brothers Brannagan had a long run starting in May 1976 on a cable channel in Surfside Beach, South Carolina, that went through August 1977.

=== Episodes ===
For consistency, the sequence of episodes and Original Air Date are based on the first station to broadcast the series, WRCV-TV in Philadelphia. There was no continuity between episodes and so no imperative to air them in any particular sequence.

No. overall	No. in season	Title	Directed by	Written by	Original release date
1	1	"Tune In For Murder"	Anton Leader	Al C. Ward	September 14, 1960
Plums found after heist point to fruit stand owned by a Native American. Cast: Vic Morrow, Paul Bryar, Rebecca Welles, Nora Hayden, James Hurley, Edith Porter
2	2	"Delayed Payment"	Unknown	Story by : Teleplay by :	September 21, 1960
A sniper is targeting brother Bob. Cast: Hal Baylor, Whit Bissell, Barney Phillips
3	3	"Duet"	Anton Leader	Story by : Teleplay by :	September 28, 1960
Cast: Elinor Donahue, Marion Ross
4	4	"Model Murder"	Unknown	Story by : Teleplay by :	October 5, 1960
Cast:
5	5	"An Hour to Kill"	Unknown	Story by : Teleplay by :	October 12, 1960
Cast:
6	6	"Damaged Dolls"	Anton Leader	Stephen Kandel	October 19, 1960
Mike goes solo in Las Vegas to stop an extortionist who uses dolls to threaten victims. Cast: Jackie Coogan, Joan Evans, Joseph Ruskin, Pamela Duncan, Jon Shepodd
7	7	"Tough Guy"	Unknown	Story by : Teleplay by :	October 26, 1960
Young woman is endangered by her brother's fight with dope gang. Cast:
8	8	"Wheel of Fortune"	Eddie Davis	Story by : Malcolm Stuart Boylan; Teleplay by : John Dana	November 2, 1960
The brothers are hired to recover a relic stolen from Mexico. Cast: Chana Eden, H. M. Wynant, K. T. Stevens, Ed Hashim, Lynn Cartwright
9	9	"Advantage: Death"	Unknown	Story by : Teleplay by :	November 9, 1960
Pro athlete kills wife and pins blame on another man. Cast:
10	10	"Sunday's Jewels"	Unknown	Story by : Teleplay by :	November 16, 1960
Jewel-obsessed respectable man is trapped by handgun ballistics tests. Cast:
11	11	"Mistaken Identity"	Anton Leader	Story by : Levinson & Link; Teleplay by : Sam Ross	November 23, 1960
The brothers' friend is snatched by gangsters mistaking her for a crime witness. Cast: Kasey Rogers, Lewis Charles, Barney Phillips, Joann Manley, Bailey Harper, Tom Cain
12	12	"A View of Murder"	Unknown	Story by : Teleplay by :	November 30, 1960
Elderly lady hires the brothers to catch a murderer whose crime she saw. Cast:
13	13	"Annabelle Case"	Unknown	Story by : Teleplay by :	December 7, 1960
Groom hires hitman to kidnap his bride before the wedding. Cast:
14	14	"Bordertown"	Unknown	Story by : Teleplay by :	December 14, 1960
Cast:
15	15	"Three"	Unknown	Story by : Teleplay by :	December 28, 1960 (Note: According to a column in The Philadelphia Inquirer, WRCV-TV's new sponsor American Stores pre-empted the December 21, 1960 episode in favor of holiday programming. See The Philadelphia Inquirer for December 21, 1960, page 16.)
Cast:
16	16	"Key of Jade"	Jean Yarborough	Harold Jack Bloom	January 4, 1961
Bob Brannagan works solo to find an old friend's missing son in San Francisco's Chinatown. Cast: Philip Ahn, Lisa Lu, Kam Tong, Aki Aleong, Sol Gorss, Greta Chi
17	17	"A Very Special Woman"	Paul Landres	Harold Jack Bloom	January 11, 1961
Woman hires the brothers to protect her from ex-boyfriend. Cast: Dorothy Green, Leo Gordon, Barney Phillips, Keith Richards, Tom Middleton, Edit Angold, Kathy Marlow
18	18	"The Baby Sitters"	Unknown	Story by : Teleplay by :	January 18, 1961
Cast:
19	19	"Twisted Root"	Unknown	Story by : Teleplay by :	January 25, 1961
The brothers work against each other over a fugitive. Cast:
20	20	"Love Me, Love My Dog"	Unknown	Story by : Teleplay by :	February 1, 1961
The brothers foil a drug gang with help from a french poodle. Cast:
21	21	"Overexposed"	Unknown	Story by : Teleplay by :	February 8, 1961
Cast:
22	22	"A Shot in the Dark"	Unknown	Story by : Teleplay by :	February 15, 1961
Cast:
23	23	"Mantrap"	Unknown	Story by : Teleplay by :	February 22, 1961
Bob is carjacked by teenage couple who have stolen a mining company payroll. Cast: Judy Nugent
24	24	"A Friend to Man"	Unknown	Story by : Teleplay by :	March 1, 1961
Cast:
25	25	"A Frame for Mike"	Unknown	Story by : Teleplay by :	March 8, 1961
Cast:
26	26	"A Deadly Love"	Unknown	Story by : Teleplay by :	March 15, 1961
Cast:
27	27	"Heart of Steel"	Unknown	Story by : Teleplay by :	March 22, 1961
Cast:
28	28	"Grapefruit King"	Unknown	Story by : Teleplay by :	March 29, 1961
Cast:
29	29	"Thunderbird"	Unknown	Story by : Teleplay by :	April 5, 1961
Cast:
30	30	"Her Brother's Keeper"	Eddie Davis	Joel M. Rapp	April 12, 1961
The brothers help a friend accused of killing his sister's fiance. Cast: Bek Nelson, Theodore Marcuse, Barney Phillips, Britt Lomond, Kent Taylor, Maureen Leeds
31	31	"The Green Gamblers"	Unknown	Story by : Teleplay by :	April 19, 1961
Cast:
32	32	"A Matter of a Million (Note: Also known as One in a Million.)"	Jean Yarborough	Arthur Dales	April 26, 1961
Southern blonde entices Mike into a bodyguard job despite Bob's warning. Cast: Joanna Moore, Narda Onyx, Paul Bryar, Robin Hughes, Jack Perkins
33	33	"The Hunter and the Hunted"	Unknown	Story by : Teleplay by :	May 3, 1961
Cast:
34	34	"Death Insurance"	Unknown	Story by : Teleplay by :	May 10, 1961
Cast:
35	35	"Terror in the Afternoon"	Jean Yarborough	Al C. Ward	May 17, 1961
Brothers are hired to investigate death of woman's fiance at dam construction site. Cast: Gloria Talbot, Robert Harland, James Flavin, Mark Houston
36	36	"Equinox"	Unknown	Story by : Teleplay by :	May 24, 1961
Cast:
37	37	"Death Is Not Deductible"	Unknown	Story by : Teleplay by :	May 31, 1961
Cast:
38	38	"Treasure Hunt"	Unknown	Story by : Teleplay by :	June 14, 1961 (Note: The gap is due to WRCV-TV rerunning the first episode on June 7, 1961.)
Cast:
39	39	"Murder Fits the Frame"	Unknown	Story by : Teleplay by :	June 21, 1961
Cast:
