= List of Ironside episodes =

Ironside is an American television crime drama that ran on NBC from September 14, 1967, to January 16, 1975. The series starred Raymond Burr as a paraplegic Chief of Detectives, Robert T. Ironside. The show consists of a movie-length pilot, eight seasons of episodes, and a reunion TV-movie.

== Series overview ==
At present, the first four seasons have been released on DVD by Shout! Factory.

Season	Episodes	Originally released	
Season	Episodes	First released	Last released
Pilot movie		March 28, 1967	
1	28	September 14, 1967	April 4, 1968
2	26	September 19, 1968	April 10, 1969
3	26	September 18, 1969	April 9, 1970
4	26	September 17, 1970	April 15, 1971
5	25	September 21, 1971	March 9, 1972
6	24	September 14, 1972	March 22, 1973
7	25	September 13, 1973	May 23, 1974
8	19	September 12, 1974	January 16, 1975 (Note: The last three episodes of the series were not broadcast on NBC, but were later seen in syndication, as well as released on DVD.)
TV Movie		May 4, 1993	

== Pilot movie (1967) ==
Title	Directed by	Written by	Original release date
A Man Called Ironside	James Goldstone	S : Collier Young; T : Don M. Mankiewicz	March 28, 1967
Chief of detectives Robert Ironside (Raymond Burr) is gunned down by a sniper. He recovers, but remains paralyzed from the waist down. Assembling a "special unit" around him, he sets out to find the sniper, and at first there is no shortage of suspects, considering how many people had sworn to kill him. Then, the analysis of an old ammunition shell leads the team to a troubled young genius, but their search is far from over. Guest stars include Wally Cox as the leader of the Boy Scouts, Joel Fabiani as the prison psychologist Dr. Schley, Kim Darby as Ellen, Tiny Tim (musician) and Stuart Margolin as member of the news crew.

== Episodes ==
=== Season 1 (1967–68) ===
No. overall	No. in season	Title	Directed by	Written by	Original release date
1	1	"Message from Beyond"	Michael Caffey	Don M. Mankiewicz	September 14, 1967
Ironside suspects that a robbery at a race track's money room could have been an inside job. Guest stars: Kent McCord, George Chandler, Kathleen Freeman
2	2	"The Leaf in the Forest"	Leo Penn	Don M. Mankiewicz	September 21, 1967
Ironside hunts a killer who's using a phantom strangler's reign of terror to cover up his own crime. Guest stars: Bert Freed, Barbara Barrie, Edward Andrews
3	3	"Dead Man's Tale"	Don Weis	T : Donald A. Brinkley; S/T : Don M. Mankiewicz	September 28, 1967
In order to take down a crime lord, Ironside spreads a rumor that a murdered hood is still alive—and ready to talk. Guest stars: Jack Lord, Simon Scott, Susanne Cramer
4	4	"Eat, Drink and Be Buried"	William Graham	Tony Barrett	October 5, 1967
An advice columnist is threatened with murder—and there's no shortage of suspects. Guest stars: Farley Granger, Lee Grant, Richard Anderson
5	5	"The Taker"	Don Weis	T : Winston Miller; S/T : Irving Gaynor Neiman	October 12, 1967
An unsolved case is reopened when Ironside works to vindicate a murder policeman who was accused of blackmailing. Guest stars: Peter Mark Richman, William Schallert, Jan Shepard
6	6	"An Inside Job"	Charles S. Dubin	Sy Salkowitz	October 19, 1967
A pair of killers hold Ironside and Eve hostage with the intention of forcing the Chief to help with their escape plan. Guest stars: Norman Fell, John Saxon, Don Stroud
7	7	"Tagged for Murder"	Charles S. Dubin	Art Weingarten	October 26, 1967
GI serial numbers scratched in a murder victim's watch case are Ironside's only clue to finding the killer. Guest stars: Bruce Lee, Jack Kelly, Antoinette Bower
8	8	"Let My Brother Go"	Don Weis	Donn Mullally	November 2, 1967
Ironside attempts to stop an athlete from taking the fall for manslaughter in order to keep his parolee brother out of prison. Guest stars: Ivan Dixon, Don Marshall, Maidie Norman
9	9	"Light at the End of the Journey"	Charles S. Dubin	S : Jeannot Szwarc; T : Sy Salkowitz, Robert Van Scoyk	November 9, 1967
Ironside uses a blind woman as live bait to catch a killer who thinks she saw him. Guest stars: Robert Reed, Katherine Crawford, William Leslie
10	10	"The Monster of Comus Towers"	Don Weis	T : Stanford Whitmore; S/T : A.J. Russell	November 16, 1967
A human fly is suspected of killing a guard at an art gallery. Guest stars: Warren Stevens, David Hartman, Evi Marandi
11	11	"The Man Who Believed"	Tony Leader	Stephen Kandel	November 23, 1967
While investigating a folk singer's apparent suicide, Ironside discovers that the young woman had a history of drug abuse. Guest stars: Marcia Strassman, Barbara Rhoades, Michael Constantine
12	12	"A Very Cool Hot Car"	James Sheldon	Luther Davis	November 30, 1967
A newly assigned lieutenant is suspected of corruption when he doesn't do anything about increasing thefts. Guest stars: Arch Johnson, Bernie Hamilton, Jay C. Flippen
13	13	"The Past Is Prologue"	Don Weis	Paul Mason	December 7, 1967
Ironside heads to New York in search of evidence that could clear a fugitive of murder charges before the death sentence is passed. Guest stars: Victor Jory, John Zaremba, Harrison Ford
14	14	"Girl in the Night"	Ralph Senensky	S : Dean Riesner; T : True Boardman	December 21, 1967
Ed gets involved with a night-club singer who has a very troubled past. Guest stars: Susan Saint James, Donnelly Rhodes, George Keymas
15	15	"The Fourteenth Runner"	Don Weis	S : Leon Tokatyan; T : Donn Mullally	December 28, 1967
Ironside investigates the disappearance of Soviet track star who's also a double agent for the U.S. government. Guest stars: Edward Asner, Steve Ihnat, Ingrid Pitt
16	16	"Force of Arms"	Tony Leader	T : Ivan Goff, Ben Roberts; S/T : Warren Duff	January 4, 1968
While investigating the murder of fanatic, Ironside is forced to deal with a group of vengeful vigilantes. Guest stars: Harold J. Stone, Gene Raymond, Diane Brewster
17	17	"Memory of an Ice Cream Stick"	Charles S. Dubin	Sy Salkowitz	January 11, 1968
Against Ironside's warning, Mark gets involved with an ex-con from his past. Guest stars: Jack Kruschen, Ena Hartman, Francine York
18	18	"To Kill a Cop"	Tony Leader	T : Donn Mullally	January 25, 1968
Ed attempts to force a cop hater to confess to the murder of two policemen. Guest stars: Pernell Roberts, Ruta Lee, Parley Baer
19	19	"The Lonely Hostage"	Charles S. Dubin	Norman Katkov	February 1, 1968
A cop who's wanted for robbing a bank and wounding another officer kidnaps Ironside and Mark. Guest stars: Robert Lansing, Kathie Browne, William Fawcett
20	20	"The Challenge"	Tony Leader	John McGreevey	February 8, 1968
Ironside thinks like an art critic to solve a psychologist's murder. Guest stars: Tom Simcox, Sue Ane Langdon, Nicholas Colasanto
21	21	"All in a Day's Work"	Charles S. Dubin	Ed McBain	February 15, 1968
When Eve feels guilty for killing a crook, Ironside helps her learn to live with her duties as a police officer. Guest stars: Jeanette Nolan, Don Hanmer, Lorraine Gary
22	22	"Something for Nothing"	Robert Butler	T : Stephen Kandel; S/T : Anthony Terpiloff	February 22, 1968
A singer helps Ironside catch a loan shark expecting his payment—with interest. Guest stars: James Farentino, Vincent Gardenia, Leonard Stone
23	23	"Barbara Who"	James Sheldon	Sy Salkowitz	February 29, 1968
Ironside develops feelings for a woman who can't remember anything—but who someone wants dead. Guest stars: Vera Miles, Philip Carey, Marion Ross
24	24	"Perfect Crime"	Charles S. Dubin	S : Leonard H. White; T : Norman Katkov	March 7, 1968
As Ironside conducts a seminar, a campus sniper brags about his plan to commit the perfect crime. Guest stars: Pete Duel, Brenda Scott, Shelly Novack
25	25	"Officer Bobby"	James Sheldon	Brett Halliday, Bill S. Ballinger	March 14, 1968
Ironside looks for a connection between a bombing and a baby found in the van. Guest stars: Jeanne Cooper, Paul Carr, Nancy Malone
26	26	"Trip to Hashbury"	Tony Leader	Norman Jolley	March 21, 1968
A conspiracy complicates Ironside's investigation of a hippie's fatal beating—that was allegedly administered by Ed. Guest stars: William Windom, Monica Lewis, Cliff Osmond
27	27	"Due Process of the Law"	Dick Colla	Don Brinkley	March 28, 1968
When Mark's girlfriend is murdered, his demands for immediate justice make it difficult to find the killer. Guest stars: David Carradine, Barry Cahill, Dwayne Hickman
28	28	"Return of the Hero"	Ralph Senensky	Robert Pirosh	April 4, 1968
Ironside's attempts to save a Vietnam hero from the gas chamber are put at risk by the man's war buddies. Guest stars: Gary Collins, Gavin MacLeod, Ron Hayes

=== Season 2 (1968–69) ===
No. overall	No. in season	Title	Directed by	Written by	Original release date
29	1	"Shell Game"	Tony Leader	Sy Salkowitz	September 19, 1968
Ironside matches wits with a master jewel thief intent on adding more to his collection. Guest stars: Charles Aidman, Johnny Seven, Sorrell Booke
30	2	"Split Second to an Epitaph"	Leonard J. Horn	S : Richard Landau; T : Don M. Mankiewicz, Sy Salkowitz	September 26, 1968
31	3	"Split Second to an Epitaph"	Leonard J. Horn	S : Richard Landau; T : Don M. Mankiewicz, Sy Salkowitz	September 26, 1968
After a melee with a thief, an operation seems possible to cure Ironside's paralysis—or kill him. Guest stars: Joseph Cotten, Troy Donahue, Andrew Prine
32	4	"The Sacrifice"	Abner Biberman	Gerald Sanford	October 3, 1968
A lawyer, a boxer and a bar girl make it difficult for Ironside to clear a detective charged with murder. Guest stars: Ricardo Montalban, Elena Verdugo, Robert Alda
33	5	"Robert Phillips vs. the Man"	Nicholas Colasanto	Sy Salkowitz	October 10, 1968
Ironside finds himself caught between white and black extremists as he attempts to clear a black militant charged with murder. Guest stars: Paul Winfield, Jack Hogan, Diane Ladd
34	6	"Desperate Encounter"	Dick Colla	Donn Mullally	October 24, 1968
While Ironside takes a vacation, he's forced to tangle with three men bent on killing him to cover up their previous murder—and implicate Mark in the Chief's murder. Guest stars: Gene Raymond, Tom Simcox
35	7	"I, the People"	Barry Shear	Milton Berle, Stephen Lord	October 31, 1968
Ironside goes through a list of suspects to find out who's been sending death threats to a TV host. Guest stars: Milton Berle, Patricia Barry, Julie Adams, Dane Clark
36	8	"Price Tag: Death"	Dick Colla	Robert Earll	November 7, 1968
A derilict's murder gives Ironside two problems: finding the killer and rehabilitating the dead man's friend. Guest stars: Clu Gulager, Peggy Ann Garner, Ralph Meeker
37	9	"An Obvious Case of Guilt"	Abner Biberman	Brad Radnitz	November 14, 1968
An attorney is accused of killing her unfaithful husband. Guest stars: Anne Baxter, Joan Tompkins, Warren Stevens
38	10	"Reprise"	Don McDougall	Albert Aley	November 21, 1968
As a manhunt ensues for the person who shot Eve, she remembers her first meetings with her co-workers during her life-and-death- struggle. Guest stars: Eddie Firestone, Nancy Wickwire, Irene Hervey
39	11	"The Macabre Mr. Micawber"	Jeannot Szwarc	Bill S. Ballinger, Brett Halliday	November 28, 1968
A myna bird that screeches in riddles provides leads to a murderer. Guest stars: Burgess Meredith, Arthur Space, Jack Kruschen
40	12	"Side Pocket"	Abner Biberman	S : Charles A. McDaniel; T : Norman Katkov, Sy Salkowitz	December 5, 1968
Ironside goes through a series of deceptions to find out why a youth gave up a promising career to become a pool hustler. Guest stars: Jack Albertson, Michael Christian, H. M. Wynant
41	13	"Sergeant Mike"	Tony Leader	Carey Wilber	December 12, 1968
A dog is the only witness to a woman's murder—a murder that seems to match a series of killings, except aimed at middle-aged men. Guest stars: Bill Bixby, John Dehner, Fred Williamson
42	14	"In Search of an Artist"	Abner Biberman	Joseph Bonaduce	January 2, 1969
Ironside reopens a homicide case when he sees a recent painting by a friend who allegedly died after confessing. Guest stars: Broderick Crawford, William Paul Burns, Barbara Werle
43	15	"Up, Down, and Even"	Don Weis	Robert Earll	January 9, 1969
Eve tries to help her niece who's been arrested on a second narcotics, bringing teenage mores and the generation gap into the fold. Guest stars: Richard Anderson, Susan O'Connell, Alfred Ryder, Edith Atwater
44	16	"Why the Tuesday Afternoon Bridge Club Met on Thursday"	Don McDougall	Irve Tunick	January 23, 1969
A team of 70-year-old sleuths—led by Ironside's Aunt Victoria—closes in on a man suspected of murdering his wife. Guest stars: Arthur O'Connell, Jessie Royce Landis, Ellen Corby
45	17	"Rundown on a Bum Rap"	Allen Reisner	Sy Salkowitz	January 30, 1969
Mark gets frustrated with the system when he tries to help a friend falsely accused of assault. Guest stars: James Gregory, Leonard Stone, Janet MacLachlan
46	18	"The Prophecy"	Don Weis	Jackson Gillis	February 6, 1969
Ironside attempts to find a piece of Da Vinci art stolen from a museum. Guest stars: Paul Stewart, Martha Scott, William Bramley
47	19	"A World of Jackals"	Don McDougall	T : Irving Pearlberg; S/T : Anthony Spinner	February 13, 1969
Ironside's investigation of a movie star's disappearance leads to estranged husband—a mob boss. Guest stars: William Smithers, Ena Hartman, Jonathan Goldsmith, Lynn Borden
48	20	"And Be My Love"	Charles S. Dubin	T : Sy Salkowitz; S/T : Dale Eunson, Katherine Eunson	February 20, 1969
Eve investigates a series of burglaries that's been pinned on a society columnist. Guest stars: Chad Everett, Amzie Strickland, J. Edward McKinley
49	21	"Moonlight Means Money"	Don Weis	Sy Salkowitz	February 27, 1969
Ed and a fellow officer are suspended for killing a drug dealer. Guest stars: John Marley, Skip Homeier, Linden Chiles, Judi Meredith
50	22	"A Drug on the Market"	Barry Shear	Arthur Weingarten	March 6, 1969
Ironside investigates when a woman is terrified by accidents and a voice threatening to kill her. Guest stars: Ray Danton, Victoria Shaw, Johnny Silver
51	23	"Puzzlelock"	Allen Reisner	B.W. Sandefur	March 13, 1969
An assistant district attorney murders his wife and frames his nephew. Guest stars: Simon Oakland, Jocelyn Brando, Dabbs Greer
52	24	"The Tormentor"	Don Weis	Norman Jolley	March 27, 1969
A baseball star is being driven to a breakdown by hate letters, threatening phone calls and pellets. Guest stars: Mary Ann Mobley, Gary Collins, Michael-James Wixted, Noam Pitlik
53	25	"A Matter of Love and Death"	Jeannot Szwarc	Jeannot Szwarc	April 3, 1969
To catch an abortionist, Eve pretends to be an unmarried woman who is pregnant. Guest stars: Bettye Ackerman, Susan Howard, Connie Kreski
54	26	"Not with a Whimper, But a Bang"	Abner Biberman	S : Robert Hamner; T : Carey Wilber	April 10, 1969
A college newspaper editor is the prime suspect in Ironside's investigation of prank bombings. Guest stars: Edward Asner, Gerald S. O'Loughlin, Ross Elliott

=== Season 3 (1969–70) ===
No. overall	No. in season	Title	Directed by	Written by	Original release date
55	1	"Alias Mr. Braithwaite"	Don Weis	S : Robert Ward; S/T : Frank Telford	September 18, 1969
Eve and Ed go undercover as a couple to nab a con man who swindles old women. Guest stars: Phillip Pine, Joseph Campanella, Beah Richards
56	2	"Goodbye to Yesterday"	Barry Shear	Sy Salkowitz	September 25, 1969
57	3	"Goodbye to Yesterday"	Barry Shear	Sy Salkowitz	September 25, 1969
Barbara Jones comes back into Ironside's life to ask him to rescue her kidnapped daughter, but the case is complicated by an overeager sheriff, a jealous husband and the Chief's personal feelings. Guest stars: Vera Miles, Cloris Leachman, Philip Carey, Slim Pickens, Dane Clark
58	4	"Poole's Paradise"	Abner Biberman	Richard Shapiro	October 2, 1969
A fugitive being pursued by a corrupt lawman attempting to hide his activities at the local jail kidnaps Ed. Guest stars: Steve Forrest, Louise Latham, Clu Gulager
59	5	"Eye of the Hurricane"	Don McDougall	Donn Mullally	October 9, 1969
Three San Quentin convicts use Ironside, Mark, the van and the warden's wife to plot their escape. Guest stars: Dana Elcar, Johnny Seven, James McEachin
60	6	"A Bullet for Mark"	Richard Benedict	Richard Bluel	October 16, 1969
Two attempts are made on Mark, leading Ironside to investigate the motive. Guest stars: Robert Alda, Felton Perry, Robert Donner, Don "Red" Barry
61	7	"Love My Enemy"	Don Weis	Irve Tunick	October 23, 1969
Ironside secures a delegation the release of American prisoners of war. Guest stars: James Shigeta, Bo Svenson, Khigh Dhiegh
62	8	"Seeing Is Believing"	Barry Shear	Charles Nicholls, Don Galloway	October 30, 1969
Five eyewitnesses claim that Ed is responsible for a bookie's fatal beating. Guest stars: Audrey Totter, Robert Ellenstein, Norman Fell
63	9	"The Machismo Bag"	Don Weis	William Douglas Lansford	November 13, 1969
A militant leads his followers into a conspiracy in a plot to commit treason. Guest stars: A Martinez, Vito Scotti, Mort Mills
64	10	"Programmed for Danger"	John Florea	True Boardman	November 20, 1969
Eve is used as bait to catch a rapist who uses a dating service to find his victims. Guest stars: Anne Baxter, Roger Perry, Adrienne Marden
65	11	"Five Miles High"	Don Weis	Margaret Schneider, Paul Schneider	November 27, 1969
Ironside shares a flight with a witness ready to testify against a racketeer—and an unknown gunman. Guest stars: Milton Selzer, Frank Aletter, Norma Crane
66	12	"L'Chayim"	Tony Leader	Mort Thaw	December 4, 1969
Ironside must recover a stolen Torah before the thieves learn it's only of value to members of a synagogue. Guest stars: David Opatoshu, Shelly Novack, Greg Mullavey
67	13	"Beyond a Shadow"	Richard Benedict	Martha Wilkerson	December 11, 1969
An old friend of Ironside's threatens to commit suicide when she's blamed for killing her husband, so it's up to the Chief to find the truth. Guest stars: Mort Sahl, Dana Wynter, Russ Conway
68	14	"Stolen on Demand"	Bill Foster	Arthur Weingarten	December 25, 1969
Mark tries to get a teenage basketball player away from a gang of thieves. Guest stars: David Cassidy, Alan Oppenheimer, Michael Hardstark, Victor Bozeman
69	15	"Dora"	John Florea	Frank Chase	January 8, 1970
Ironside must stop a crime organization from placing a stake in the produce market. Guest stars: Ann Doran, Sidney Clute, Barbara Rhoades
70	16	"Beware the Wiles of a Stranger"	Don Weis	Robert Earll	January 22, 1970
A waitress who played a part in a robbery picks Mark as a fall guy. Guest stars: Tina Louise, Charles Aidman, John Ericson
71	17	"Eden Is the Place We Leave"	Daniel Petrie	John Kneubuhl	January 29, 1970
Ironside attempts to break a Samoan boxer's tradition of continuing life in the ring. Guest stars: Patrick Adiarte, John Marley, Sandy Kenyon, Ruth McDevitt
72	18	"The Wrong Time, the Wrong Place"	John Florea	Sy Salkowitz, Norman Borisoff	February 5, 1970
Ed's relationship with a starlet is jeopardized by her feelings about his gun. Guest stars: Frank Maxwell, Tiffany Bolling, George Petrie
73	19	"Return to Fiji"	Don Weis	Sy Salkowitz	February 12, 1970
While on vacation in Fiji, Ironside gets involved in a plot to steal gold. Guest stars: Bernard Fox, Larry D. Mann, Alan Napier
74	20	"Ransom"	Abner Biberman	Arthur Weingarten	February 19, 1970
A banker is unwilling to help the police capture the man who kidnapped his wife and Eve. Guest stars: Fritz Weaver, Art Metrano, Carla Borelli
75	21	"One Hour to Kill"	Richard Benedict	Sandy Stern	February 26, 1970
Ironside's ingenuity is put to the test when he's faced with a gun-toting youth. Guest stars: Lavelle Roby, Henry Corden, Robert Lipton,
76	22	"Warrior's Return"	Don Weis	S : Joyce Perry; T : Irving Pearlberg	March 5, 1970
The prime suspect in a jewelry-store robbery is the silversmith whom Ironside recommended in the first place. Guest stars: George Keymas, Lois Red Elk, Dabbs Greer, DeForest Kelley
77	23	"Little Jerry Jessup"	Don Weis	Sy Salkowitz	March 12, 1970
Ironside bends the rules to help a boy whose mother was murdered and whose father is in jail. Guest stars: Mitch Vogel, William Shatner, Nancy Malone
78	24	"Good Will Tour"	Robert Day	Norman Katkov	March 26, 1970
Ironside finds his order to guard a visiting crown prince difficult due to the prince's thirst for night life. Guest stars: Bradford Dillman, Claudia Bryar, Wesley Addy
79	25	"Little Dog, Gone"	Don Weis	Frank Telford	April 2, 1970
Ironside attempts to capture dognappers who are abducting dogs owned by rich people. Guest stars: Belinda Montgomery, Leo G. Carroll, Martin West
80	26	"Tom Dayton Is Loose Among Us"	Don McDougall	Francine Carroll	April 9, 1970
Ed goes after the psychopath who murdered his fiancee. Guest stars: Bill Bixby, Lorraine Gary, William Smithers

=== Season 4 (1970–71) ===
No. overall	No. in season	Title	Directed by	Written by	Original release date
81	1	"A Killing Will Occur"	Don Weis	Alvin Sapinsley	September 17, 1970
Ironside enters a battle of wits with an anonymous caller who has predicted a murder. Guest stars: Barry Brown, Dane Clark, Virginia Gregg
82	2	"No Game for Amateurs"	John Florea	Sy Salkowitz	September 24, 1970
Ironside rides a draft dodgers' railway to find a killer. Guest stars: Martin Sheen, Carl Reindel, Pamela McMyler
83	3	"The Happy Dreams of Hollow Men"	Don Weis	S : Carol Salkowitz; S/T : Sy Salkowitz	October 1, 1970
Ironside is trapped in a cabin during a blizzard with an old friend who's become a heroin addict. This is the only episode in which Don Galloway does not appear. Guest stars: Joseph Campanella, Harry Lauter, Lloyd Battista
84	4	"The People Against Judge McIntire"	Abner Biberman	S : Mark Rodgers; S/T : Liam O'Brien	October 8, 1970
Mark's law class re-enacts a murder case when real drama unfolds. Guest stars: James Daly, Mala Powers, Tyne Daly, Alan Hale Jr.
85	5	"Noel's Gonna Fly"	Don Weis	Sy Salkowitz	October 15, 1970
A man charged with public intoxication gets involved with a girl and a rock musician after skipping his arraignment. Guest stars: Richard Basehart, Tim Considine, Dorothy Green, Michael Ontkean
86	6	"The Lonely Way to Go"	Richard Benedict	Donn Mullally	October 22, 1970
An investment manager's confession to a murder seems to contradict the evidence in the case. Guest stars: Carl Betz, Sidney Clute, Johnny Seven
87	7	"Check, Mate and Murder: Part 1"	David Lowell Rich	Sandy Stern	October 29, 1970
Ironside meets an old flame while in Montreal and gets involved in the Separatist movement. Guest stars: Hermione Gingold, Karin Dor, Émile Genest, William Lanteau
88	8	"Check, Mate and Murder: Part 2"	David Lowell Rich	Sandy Stern	November 5, 1970
Ironside's trip to Montreal continues as he gets involved in a murder plot while searching for a stolen chess set. Guest stars: Hermione Gingold, Alain Patrick, John van Dreelen, Alan Bergmann
89	9	"Too Many Victims"	Corey Allen	Irving Pearlberg	November 12, 1970
A captain sets out to take down the dealer who gave his daughter marijuana. Guest stars: Forrest Tucker, Paul Carr, Kathleen Lloyd
90	10	"The Man on the Inside"	Don McDougall	T : Sy Salkowitz; S/T : Brad Radnitz	November 19, 1970
An arrested drug pusher frames Ironside to get revenge. Guest stars: Gerald S. O'Loughlin, Michael Bell, Simon Scott
91	11	"Backfire"	John Florea	Frank Telford	December 3, 1970
Mark writes a hypothetical brief about a convicted murderer for his law class, which results in the case being reopened and the convict accusing Ed of framing him. Guest stars: James Wainwright, Robert F. Lyons, Vaughn Taylor
92	12	"The Laying On of Hands"	Don McDougall	Tom Seller	December 10, 1970
Ironside probes the managers of an alleged faith healer. Guest stars: Phyllis Love, Alan Hewitt, Paul Fix
93	13	"This Could Blow Your Mind"	James Neilson	T : Sy Salkowitz; S/T : Stephen Cannell	December 17, 1970
Ironside goes to a hospital for psychological evaluation where a crook is trying to learn the whereabouts of a police informant. Guest stars: Bradford Dillman, Ann Doran, George Grizzard
94	14	"Blackout"	Don McDougall	Robert Pirosh	December 31, 1970
A blackout in San Francisco is apparently being used to cover up a crime. Guest stars: Roman Gabriel, Jack Albertson, Myron Healey
95	15	"The Quincunx"	Don Weis	Max Hodge	January 7, 1971
The sister in a folk trio vanishes without a trace and another young woman is found brutally murdered. Guest stars: Carla Borelli, David Carradine, Michael Blodgett
96	16	"From Hruska with Love"	Alf Kjellin	Richard Shapiro	January 21, 1971
Ironside is kidnapped along with a Communist spy. Guest stars: Diana Hyland, Ron Soble, Mario Alcalde
97	17	"The Target"	Don Weis	Sy Salkowitz	January 28, 1971
An ex-con demolitions expert's son is kidnapped. Guest stars: Earl Holliman, Vincent Van Patten, Luana Anders
98	18	"A Killing at the Track"	Don McDougall	Robert Pirosh, Max Hodge	February 4, 1971
A jockey is suspected of throwing races. Guest stars: Joel Grey, Ron Ely, Dana Elcar
99	19	"Escape"	John Florea	Adrian Spies	February 11, 1971
Ed and Eve travel to Mexico where they're suspected of helping a convict—whom they believe is innocent of murder—escape. Guest stars: Scott Glenn, Nico Minardos, Nate Esformes, Robert Ellenstein
100	20	"Love, Peace, Brotherhood and Murder"	Don Weis	T : Sy Salkowitz; S/T : Robert Earll	February 18, 1971
An actress in a play dies from a heroin overdose. Guest stars: David Bailey, Angel Tompkins, Robert Lipton, Sally Struthers
101	21	"The Riddle in Room Six"	John Florea	Stephen Cannell	February 25, 1971
Ironside has 24 hours to prove that a racketeer bribed a juror at his trial. Guest stars: Paul Stevens, Andrew Duggan, Joe Maross
102	22	"The Summer Soldier"	Don Weis	Jameson Brewer	March 4, 1971
Ironside helps an elderly Armenian tobacconist who is being blackmailed by two nephews who are using his shop to manufacture cigarettes laced with PCP. Guest stars: Theodore Bikel, Walter Koenig, Vincent Beck
103	23	"The Accident"	Don Weis	T : Irving Pearlberg; S/T : William Douglas Lansford	March 11, 1971
When Mark and a woman get into a traffic accident, Ironside suspects an insurance fraud was committed. Guest stars: Juanita Moore, Edward Binns, Ahna Capri
104	24	"Lesson in Terror"	James Neilson	Donn Mullally	March 18, 1971
An attorney is concerned about his son getting involved with anarchists. Guest stars: David Soul, Simon Oakland, Brad David, Christina Crawford
105	25	"Grandmother's House"	Don Weis	Preston Wood	April 1, 1971
A 70-year-old corporation director's purse is snatched. Guest stars: Jessie Royce Landis, Burr DeBenning, Quinn O'Hara
106	26	"Walls Are Waiting"	Barry Shear	Sy Salkowitz	April 15, 1971
A parole officer is obsessed with drug dealers. This is Barbara Anderson's final episode. Guest stars: William Shatner, Roger C. Carmel, Morris Buchanan

=== Season 5 (1971–72) ===
No. overall	No. in season	Title	Directed by	Written by	Original release date
107	1	"The Priest Killer"	Richard A. Colla	S : David Levy; T : Joel Oliansky; S/T : Robert Van Scoyk	September 14, 1971
108	2	"The Priest Killer"	Richard A. Colla	S : David Levy; T : Joel Oliansky; S/T : Robert Van Scoyk	September 14, 1971
Ironside teams up with Father Samuel Cavanaugh to capture a murderer. This 2-hour episode serves as a crossover with the series Sarge. Guest stars: Anthony Zerbe, Louise Latham, David Huddleston
109	3	"Contract: Kill Ironside"	Don Weis	Stephen Karpf, Elinor Karpf	September 21, 1971
Ironside discovers a contract signed to take his life—and the man who signed it has never fouled up. Guest stars: James Olson, George N. Neise, Marion Ross
110	4	"The Professionals"	Don Weis	Sy Salkowitz	September 28, 1971
Ironside pursues a gang of credit card thieves. Guest stars: James Drury, Michael Lerner, Cliff Emmich
111	5	"The Gambling Game"	Don Weis	Sy Salkowitz	October 5, 1971
Ironside finds it suspicious that a hood is eager to vindicate a dead police captain accused of working with gamblers. Elizabeth Baur makes her debut as Fran Belding in this episode. Guest stars: Van Williams, Madlyn Rhue, Bobby Darin
112	6	"Ring of Prayer"	Don Weis	Jack Morse	October 12, 1971
Ironside matches wits with a phony psychic. Guest stars: Barbara Rush, Ray Walston, Paul Stewart
113	7	"In the Line of Duty"	Don McDougall	Mark Rodgers	October 19, 1971
A local thief is suspected of killing a policeman—until evidence suggests otherwise. Guest stars: Vera Miles, Brandon deWilde, Ned Romero, Ann Doran
114	8	"Joss Sticks and Wedding Bells"	Leslie Martinson	Marty Roth	October 26, 1971
Ironside probes his Korean foster daughter's fiance. Guest stars: Miko Mayama, Soon-tek Oh, Brian Fong, Lee Delano
115	9	"Murder Impromptu"	Don Weis	S : John McGreevey; S/T : Max Hodge	November 2, 1971
A group of stage actors are suspects in a stabbing. This episode reunites Raymond Burr with his former Perry Mason costar Barbara Hale. Guest stars: Roddy McDowall, Anne Archer, Elaine Giftos
116	10	"Dear Fran"	Don Weis	Edward de Blasio	November 9, 1971
Fran investigates when her cousin is alleged to have jumped off the Golden Gate Bridge. Guest stars: Anthony James, Christine Belford, M. Emmet Walsh, Victor Holchak
117	11	"If a Body See a Body"	Don McDougall	Max Hodge	November 16, 1971
Ed tries to prove he saw a body—even though the corpse keeps vanishing on him. Guest stars: Lee Montgomery, Beth Brickell, Warren Berlinger
118	12	"The Good Samaritan"	Leslie H. Martinson	Frank Telford	November 23, 1971
A murder case gets personal for Ed because the suspect is the man who saved his life. Guest stars: Michael Callan, Don 'Red' Barry, Diana Muldaur
119	13	"Gentle Oaks"	Robert Clouse	Michael Fisher	November 25, 1971
Ironside faces off against a malevolent nurse in a convalescent home with a suspiciously high death rate. Guest stars: Ruth Roman, John Carradine, Harry Townes
120	14	"License to Kill"	Don Weis	Donn Mullally	December 2, 1971
Ironside uses old-fashioned detective work to clear a cop framed for murder. Guest stars: Jackie Coogan, David Carradine, Roger Perry
121	15	"Class of '57"	James Neilson	T : Robert Earll; S/T : Sy Salkowitz	December 16, 1971
Ed looks for a classmate who's become a wanted man. Guest stars: Gary Crosby, Alex Henteloff, Marlyn Mason
122	16	"No Motive for Murder"	Leslie H. Martinson	Sy Salkowitz	December 23, 1971
While in Tokyo, Ironside must find out who's trying to kill a disabled ex-kabuki dancer. Guest stars: George Takei, James Shigeta, Yuki Shimoda
123	17	"But When She Was Bad"	Corey Allen	Alvin Boretz	December 30, 1971
A woman appears to be the target of a stalker with no apparent motive for attacking her. The stalker may be just a trick - the woman has a connection to a former cop killer recently released from prison who has a grudge against Ironside. Guest stars: Suzanne Pleshette, Len Lesser, Dane Clark
124	18	"Unreasonable Facsimile"	Don Weis	Merwin Gerard	January 6, 1972
A makeup artist who just did time for a bank robbery is believed to be back in business. Guest stars: Bernie Kopell, Burgess Meredith, Susan Seaforth Hayes
125	19	"Find a Victim"	Christian Nyby II	Irving Pearlberg	January 13, 1972
The victims of a burglary wave, ironically, are all crooks. Guest stars: Pat Hingle, Paul Winfield, Robert Emhardt, Charo
126	20	"And Then There Was One"	Arnold Laven	Fred Freiberger	January 20, 1972
Ironside probes the deaths of former Army buddies who were all killed with hand-grenades. Guest stars: Bo Hopkins, Percy Rodriguez, Felton Perry
127	21	"Death by the Numbers"	Don Weis	Francine Carroll	January 27, 1972
Ironside pretends to be a member of a parole board to put an end to a series of murders that have left the board victimized. Guest stars: George Murdock, Jacqueline Scott, Shelly Novack, Marilyn Erskine
128	22	"Bubble, Bubble, Toil and Murder"	Christian I. Nyby II	Sy Salkowitz	February 3, 1972
Ironside investigates when the daughter of his friend practices witchcraft and blames herself for the death of her parents' landlord. Guest stars: Jodie Foster, Rod Serling, Lee Paul
129	23	"Achilles' Heel"	Raymond Burr	Frank Telford	February 17, 1972
A man on trial for murder tries to get acquitted by framing the judge's son for the crime. Guest stars: William Windom, Angel Tompkins, Kerwin Mathews
130	24	"His Fiddlers Three"	Alf Kjellin	Edward DeBlasio	March 2, 1972
A musical note is Ironside's clue to finding the murderer of an unpopular music teacher. Guest stars: Tim Matheson, Collin Wilcox, Kathleen Lloyd
131	25	"A Man Named Arno"	Chris Christenberry	Helen McAvity	March 9, 1972
A drug dealer is the prime suspect in the case of a missing husband. Guest stars: Anne Francis, Woodrow Parfrey, Nico Minardos

=== Season 6 (1972–73) ===
No. overall	No. in season	Title	Directed by	Written by	Original release date
132	1	"Five Days in the Death of Sergeant Brown: Part 1"	Leonard J. Horn	Robert Van Scoyk	September 14, 1972
Dr. David Craig (E. G. Marshall) and Dr. Paul Hunter (David Hartman) work to save Ed when he's hit a by a sniper, while Ironside remembers the same circumstances that left him paralyzed. This episode continues on The Bold Ones: The New Doctors. Guest stars: Stephen Young, Ed Flanders, Vic Morrow
133	2	"The Savage Sentry"	Don Weis	William Douglas Lansford	September 21, 1972
A burglar figures out how to rob stores guarded by dogs. Guest stars: Anthony Zerbe, Mariclare Costello, Bo Svenson
134	3	"Programmed for Panic"	Daniel Petrie	Adrian Spies	September 28, 1972
Ironside appears on a telethon to ask those who have witnessed a murder to step forward. Guest stars: Russell Johnson, Ed Begley Jr., Katherine MacGregor
135	4	"Down Two Roads"	Don Weis	Sy Salkowitz	October 12, 1972
Mark is forced to make a case against a friend accused of robbery. Guest stars: Michael Lerner, Eugene Roche, David Spielberg
136	5	"Camera...Action...Murder!"	Russ Mayberry	Michael Butler & Christopher Trumbo	October 26, 1972
Ironside must figure out who's sending him films of future murder victims. Guest stars: Joe Don Baker, Anthony Caruso, Dennis Patrick
137	6	"Riddle Me Death"	Jeffrey Hayden	Edward DeBlasio	November 2, 1972
When a package is stolen, a series of Oriental ideograms give clues to the contents. Guest stars: William Devane, Yuki Shimoda, Ernest Harada, Sian Barbara Allen
138	7	"Nightmare Trip"	Raymond Burr	Richard Landau	November 9, 1972
Ed experiences jail from a prisoner's point of view when he gets booked on a misdemeanor. Guest stars: Steve Sandor, Don Stroud, Jonathan Goldsmith
139	8	"Buddy, Can You Spare a Life?"	Don Weis	A.A. Roberts & Peter Penduk	November 16, 1972
140	9	"Buddy, Can You Spare a Life?"	Don Weis	A.A. Roberts & Peter Penduk	November 16, 1972
Ironside must vindicate a convicted murderer he put in jail. Guest stars: Lonny Chapman, Cameron Mitchell, Ray Middleton
141	10	"The Countdown"	Don Weis	Bill S. Ballinger	November 23, 1972
A scientist has an explosive strapped to him that's about to explode. Guest stars: Richard Jaeckel, Jackie Cooper, Ed Lauter
142	11	"The Deadly Gamesmen"	Don Weis	Max Hodge	November 30, 1972
A group of criminals called "The Deadly Gamesmen" are using live pawns and a crime for every move in their own version of chess. Guest stars: Noel Harrison, Scott Marlowe, Conlan Carter
143	12	"Who'll Cry for My Baby?"	Richard Donner	David P. Harmon	December 7, 1972
Prostitutes and panderers help Ironside solve a murder. Guest stars: Tisha Sterling, Don Pedro Colley, Ted Cassidy
144	13	"Cold, Hard Cash"	Don Weis	Stephen Lord	December 14, 1972
Ed goes undercover to thwart a kidnapping plot. Guest stars: Barbara Rush, Kaz Garas, Richard Anderson
145	14	"Shadow Soldiers"	Daniel Haller	S : Michael Fisher; T : Sy Salkowitz	December 21, 1972
Ironside helps Scotland Yard solve a police superintendent's murder. Guest stars: Lloyd Bochner, Stefan Gierasch, Donald Moffat
146	15	"Ollinger's Last Case"	Don Weis	Frank Telford	January 4, 1973
Ironside pursues the man who killed his friend: a retired cop. Guest stars: Kenneth Mars, Albert Salmi, Loretta Swit
147	16	"A Special Person"	Jeffrey Hayden	Frank Chase & Ramona Chase	January 11, 1973
The attempted murder of a magazine editor brings up several suspects. Guest stars: Barry Sullivan, Leslie Charleson, Melendy Britt
148	17	"The Caller"	Don Weis	Margaret Armen	January 25, 1973
Fran is plagued by obscene—and threatening—phone calls. Guest stars: Barry Livingston, L.Q. Jones, Dabney Coleman
149	18	"Love Me in December"	Don Weis	William Gordon & James Doherty	February 1, 1973
The prime suspect in a murder is a rancher engaged to the town's belle. Guest stars: Simon Oakland, Steve Forrest, Katherine Cannon, Madlyn Rhue
150	19	"The Ghost of the Dancing Doll"	Russell Mayberry	Orville H. Hampton	February 15, 1973
A ship containing a bloodstain and a bullet hole comes into the bay. Guest stars: Christopher Connelly, Jess Walton, Abner Biberman
151	20	"All About Andrea"	Russ Mayberry	Michael Butler & Christopher Trumbo	February 22, 1973
Someone is trying to kill an outspoken champion of women's liberation. Guest stars: Myrna Loy, Jacqueline Scott, Neva Patterson
152	21	"Another Shell Game"	Alvin Ganzer	Sy Salkowitz	March 1, 1973
Ironside works to thwart a developing art heist. Guest stars: Scott Glenn, Skye Aubrey, Dan O'Herlihy, George DiCenzo
153	22	"All Honorable Men"	Russ Mayberry	William Douglas Lansford	March 8, 1973
A thief overcomes a maze of alarms to get to a bank vault. Guest stars: William Daniels, Sandra Smith, Leonard Stone
154	23	"The Best Laid Plans"	Daniel Haller	David P. Harmon	March 15, 1973
Ironside gets trapped in a bank along with a gang of robbers and a group of hostages. Guest stars: Frank Marth, Rafael Campos, Whit Bissell
155	24	"A Game of Showdown"	Don Weis	T : Sy Salkowitz; S/T : Mann Rubin	March 22, 1973
Ironside plays poker with a card-sharp murder suspect. Guest stars: Robert Webber, Scott Brady, Mary Murphy, Cheryl Ladd

=== Season 7 (1973–74) ===
No. overall	No. in season	Title	Directed by	Written by	Original release date
156	1	"Confessions from a Lady of the Night"	Don Weis	Shawn Mallory	September 13, 1973
A magazine reveals details of Ironside's life—its source being a "lady of the night". Guest stars: Lynn Carlin, Dorothy Malone, William Schallert
157	2	"Murder by One"	Alexander Singer	T : Sy Salkowitz; S/T : David Vowell	September 20, 1973
Ironside questions whether the gunshot that killed a boy was suicide or murder. Guest stars: Mary Ure, Clu Gulager, Herb Edelman
158	3	"In the Forests of the Night"	Russ Mayberry	S : Cy Chermak; T : Michael P. Butler, Christopher Trumbo	September 27, 1973
Ironside's long-lost love returns—only she's still a professional thief. Guest stars: Dana Wynter, Frank Aletter, Wesley Lau
159	4	"Fragile Is the House of Cards"	Don Weis	Sy Salkowitz	October 4, 1973
A man could be in danger, but only an amnesiac's hazy memories provide clues. Guest stars: James Olson, Lorraine Gary, Noah Keen
160	5	"The Armageddon Gang"	Russ Mayberry	Larry Brody	October 11, 1973
A scientist working on a project disappears, putting national security in jeopardy. Guest stars: Joseph Campanella, Harold Gould, Ramon Bieri
161	6	"House of Terror"	Don Weis	William Douglas Lansford	October 25, 1973
Two visitors to a supposedly haunted mansion mysteriously disappear. Guest stars: Sharon Gless, Russell Wiggins, Dabbs Greer
162	7	"The Helping Hand"	Jerry Jameson	William D. Gordon, James Doherty	November 1, 1973
An illegal immigration-smuggling ring hunts down a Mexican woman out to expose their operation. Guest stars: Maria Elena Cordero, Cameron Mitchell, Joshua Bryant, Rodolfo Acosta
163	8	"Downhill All the Way"	Don Weis	S : Francine Carroll; S/T : Michael P. Butler, Christopher Trumbo	November 8, 1973
164	9	"Downhill All the Way"	Don Weis	S : Francine Carroll; S/T : Michael P. Butler, Christopher Trumbo	November 8, 1973
Ironside quits the force and winds up on skid row after a boy who was in his custody gets killed. Guest stars: Lee Montgomery, David Wayne, Kim Darby, William Devane
165	10	"Mind for Murder"	Gene Nelson	Judy Burns	November 15, 1973
A psychic can apparently predict the times and targets of arson attacks. Guest stars: Ross Martin, Burr DeBenning, John Doucette, Louise Sorel
166	11	"The Hidden Man"	Don Weis	William Gordon, James Doherty	November 29, 1973
An ex-prisoner of war refuses to believe his policeman father died in an auto accident. Guest stars: Cliff Potts, Zalman King, Harvey Jason
167	12	"The Double-Edged Corner"	David Friedkin	Richard Landau	December 6, 1973
A gambler must sell information to Ironside to support his losses. Guest stars: Nancy Malone, Albert Salmi, Allen Garfield
168	13	"The Last Payment"	Daniel Haller	Felton Perry, William Gordon, James Doherty	December 20, 1973
Mark goes under cover to take down an extortion ring. Guest stars: Felton Perry, Scatman Crothers, Roger Robinson
169	14	"Friend or Foe" "For the Love of God"	Jerry Jameson	David P. Harmon	January 3, 1974
A detective friend of Ironside's is suspected of stealing heroin that was evidence. Guest stars: Kenneth O'Brien, Byron Morrow, Jack Grimes, Jean Allison, Lew Palter
170	15	"Two Hundred Large"	Robert Scheerer	Maurie Goodman	January 10, 1974
A bank robber's daughter is kidnapped and held for ransom. Guest stars: Paul Burke, Michael Bell, Woodrow Parfrey
171	16	"Once More for Joey"	Krishna Shah	Sam Roeca	January 17, 1974
A record pirate who was bootlegging a musician's recordings is suspected of electrocuting him. Guest stars: Geoffrey Deuel, Paul Hampton, Pamela Bellwood
172	17	"Terror on Grant Avenue"	Arnold Laven	Arthur Rowe	January 31, 1974
The son of Ironside's old friend is the prime suspect in the murder of a Chinatown businessman. Guest stars: Mako, Irene Tsu, Frank Michael Liu, Benson Fong
173	18	"Class of '40"	Barry Shear	T : Norman Jolley; S/T : Richard L. Breen Jr., James T. Surtees	February 7, 1974
Ironside gets nostalgic when he returns to his home town to investigate the death of an old friend. Guest stars: Anne Francis, Jason Evers, Leif Erickson
174	19	"A Taste of Ashes"	Alvin Ganzer	Dick Nelson	February 14, 1974
The murder of a brother in a family occurs before the sister's surprise return. Guest stars: Kim Hunter, Gretchen Corbett, Scott Hylands
175	20	"A Death in Academe"	Russ Mayberry	Michael P. Butler, Christopher Trumbo	February 21, 1974
A controversial teacher is a target for murder after one of his students commits suicide. Guest stars: Michael Parks, Malachi Throne, Mike Kellin, Mary Layne
176	21	"Close to the Heart"	David Friedkin	Pauline Stone, Mike Cosgrove	February 28, 1974
A woman with a bullet near her heart claims she doesn't remember ever getting shot. Guest stars: Elizabeth Ashley, James Luisi, Anthony Eisley
177	22	"Come Eleven, Come Twelve"	Don Weis	Robert I. Holt	March 7, 1974
Members of a crime syndicate intercept Ed to kill his prisoner—their former associate. Guest stars: Andrew Robinson, David Huddleston, Michael Strong
178	23	"Riddle at 24,000"	Don Weis	T : Lane Slate; S/T : Ken Kolb	March 14, 1974
A medic helps Ironside with his investigation of a disguised murder. This is the only episode where Don Mitchell does not appear. Guest stars: L.Q. Jones, Ralph Meeker, Desi Arnaz, Linda Foster
179	24	"Amy Prentiss" "The Chief"	Boris Sagal	S : Francine Carroll; S/T : James Doherty, William Gordon	May 23, 1974
180	25	"Amy Prentiss" "The Chief"	Boris Sagal	S : Francine Carroll; S/T : James Doherty, William Gordon	May 23, 1974
A woman's promotion to chief of detectives sparks controversy. This two-hour episode serves as the pilot for the series Amy Prentiss. Guest stars: Jessica Walter, William Shatner, Pippa Scott, Robert Webber, Jack Soo

=== Season 8 (1974–75) ===
No. overall	No. in season	Title	Directed by	Written by	Original release date
181	1	"Raise the Devil: Part 1"	Russ Mayberry	S : Jimmy Sangster; S/T : Anthony Lawrence	September 12, 1974
Ironside deals with the supernatural when he learns that a murder victim believed she was possessed. Guest stars: Carolyn Jones, Sian Barbara Allen, Bill Bixby
182	2	"Raise the Devil: Part 2"	Russ Mayberry	S : Jimmy Sangster; S/T : Anthony Lawrence	September 19, 1974
Ironside's supernatural-themed case comes to a close when he discovers a psychiatrist using hypnosis to turn his patients into killers. Guest stars: Carolyn Jones, Michael Anderson Jr., Dane Clark
183	3	"What's New with Mark?"	Charles S. Dubin	Irving Pearlberg	September 26, 1974
When Mark graduates law school, his first case is defending a grocery-store owner accused of murder. Guest stars: Frank Gorshin, Ned Glass, Joan Pringle
184	4	"Trial by Terror"	Russ Mayberry	Lou Shaw	October 3, 1974
When a witness in a case going on trial is murdered, Ed attempts to persuade the victim's daughter to take her father's place on the stand. Guest stars: Joan Van Ark, Tom Troupe, Pamela Hensley
185	5	"Cross Doublecross"	Don Weis	Robert I. Holt	October 10, 1974
Fran's detective boyfriend is accused of killing an unarmed suspect. Guest stars: Gary Lockwood, Madlyn Rhue, Mike Farrell
186	6	"Set-Up: Danger!"	Russ Mayberry	William Gordon, James Doherty	October 24, 1974
A mobster kidnaps Ironside with the intention of proving his niece was murdered by a rival criminal's son. Guest stars: John Vernon, Gary Crosby, Barry Sullivan, Casey Kasem
187	7	"The Lost Cotillion"	Alvin Ganzer	Walter Black	October 31, 1974
A friend of Ironside's is afraid she could be a schizophrenic murderer. Guest stars: Kim Hunter, Jess Walton, Dana Andrews, Cesar Romero, Meg Wyllie, Alan Napier
188	8	"Run Scared"	Don McDougall	Hindi Brooks	November 7, 1974
Ironside's goddaughter witnesses a murder—and becomes the next target. Guest stars: Kathleen Quinlan, Ed Nelson, Bettye Ackerman
189	9	"Act of Vengeance"	David Friedkin	True Boardman	November 14, 1974
A parolee is determined to avenge his son's murder. Guest stars: Ned Romero, Kathie Browne, Paul Burke, Anne Seymour, Butch Patrick
190	10	"Far Side of the Fence"	David Friedkin	Judy Burns	November 21, 1974
When Ed infiltrates a crime ring, he's told to kill Ironside in order to prove his loyalty. Guest stars: Jim Hutton, Peter Mark Richman, Shelley Fabares, Elisha Cook Jr.
191	11	"The Over-the-Hill Blues"	Don McDougall	Robert Hamner	December 5, 1974
A jewel thief is plotting to steal the four most valuable treasures in San Francisco. Guest stars: Leslie Nielsen, Beverly Garland, Jack Soo
192	12	"Speak No Evil"	Don Weis	Oliver Crawford	December 12, 1974
Although a priest is being stalked, he denies being in danger. Guest stars: Christopher Connelly, Jean Allison, Davis Roberts
193	13	"Fall of an Angel"	Daniel Haller	T : James Doherty, William Gordon; S/T : Phyllis White, Robert White	December 19, 1974
A fugitive leaves his son in Ironside's van. Guest stars: Judy Pace, William Elliott, Val Bisoglio, Joan Pringle, Henry Beckman
194	14	"The Visiting Fireman"	Don Weis	Jimmy Sangster	December 26, 1974
Ironside's fireman friend from Scotland Yard is plotting a robbery. Guest stars: John Williams, Hedley Mattingly, Barry Cahill
195	15	"The Return of Eleanor Rogers"	Don Weis	S : Alfred Brenner; S/T : James Doherty, William Gordon	January 2, 1975
A judge receives threats since his wife once had connections to the mob. Guest stars: Joseph Campanella, Ina Balin, Katherine Cannon, Joseph V. Perry
196	16	"The Faded Image"	Bruce Kessler	Mann Rubin	January 16, 1975
When Fran is assaulted, her colleagues launch a search for the culprit. Guest stars: Julie Gregg, Gary Frank, Paul Mantee, Joan Pringle
197	17	"A Matter of Life or Death"	Jeffrey Hayden	T : Joel Rogosin; S/T : Leonardo Bercovici	N/A
A woman accidentally kills her lover, but her lawyer is preventing her from confessing. Guest stars: Warren Stevens, Whitney Blake, Harris Yulin
198	18	"The Organizer"	Jerry Jameson	David P. Harmon	N/A
Ironside and his colleagues infiltrate a meeting arranged by a criminal who intends to start an organization in California. Guest stars: Pernell Roberts, Harry Townes, Johnny Seven
199	19	"The Rolling Y"	Don McDougall	S : Sam Roeca; T : James Doherty, William Gordon	N/A
A rancher's son, just off of probation and often helped by Ironside, is accused of cattle rustling and murder. He swears he didn't rustle any cattle. Guest stars: William Katt, John Larch, Shelly Novack, William Bramley, Bill Williams

== TV Movie (1993) ==
Title	Directed by	Written by	Original release date
The Return of Ironside	Gary Nelson	Rob Hedden, William Read Woodfield	May 4, 1993
Chief Robert Ironside comes out of retirement when the chief of the Denver police department, where Ed Brown now works, dies prematurely and the daughter of Eve Whitfield is suspected of murdering her boyfriend. Guest stars: Dana Wynter, Perrey Reeves, Cliff Gorman, Ed Lauter, Jeff Kaake, Derek Webster

== See also ==
- List of The Bold Ones: The New Doctors episodes – includes Part 2 of "Five Days in the Death of Sergeant Brown"
