= Barbara Anderson (actress) =

American actress (born 1945)

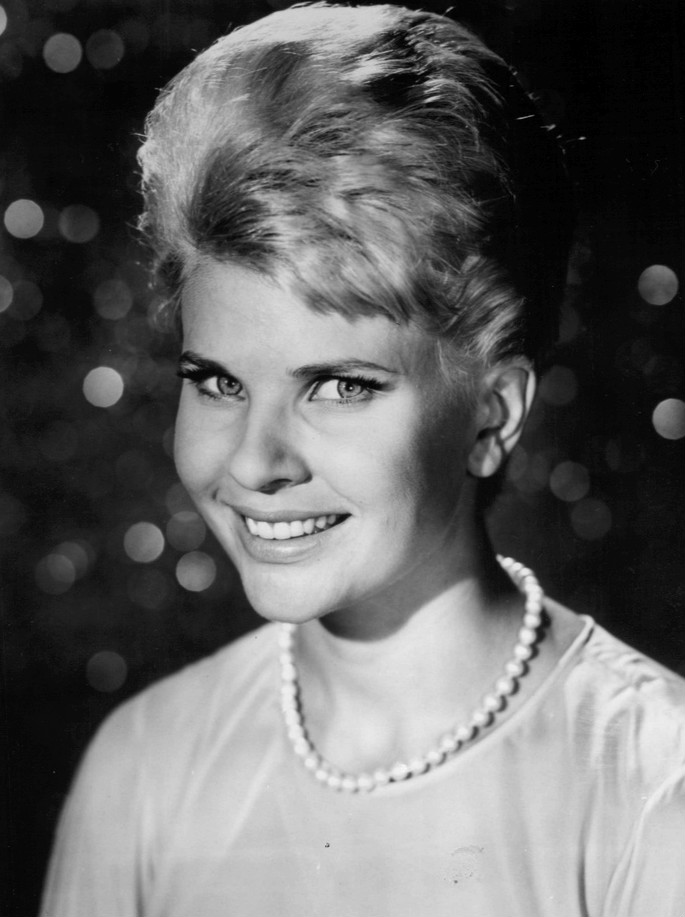
- Anderson in 1969
- Born: Barbara Jeanne Anderson; November 27, 1945 (age 80); New York City, U.S.
- Other name: Barbara Anderson Burnett
- Occupation: Actress
- Years active: 1966–1993
- Spouse: Don Burnett (m. 1971)

Barbara Jeanne Anderson (born November 27, 1945) is a retired American actress who portrayed police officer Eve Whitfield on the television series Ironside (1967–1971), which earned her a Primetime Emmy Award. Following the death of Elizabeth Baur in 2017, Anderson is the last surviving original Ironside cast member as of 2026.

== Early life ==
Anderson was born in Brooklyn, New York. Her father, George Anderson, was a Navy enlisted man.

Anderson became interested in acting during her teens, when she did a Tennessee Williams play. While she was a student at Memphis State University, Anderson won the title of Miss Memphis in 1963. Anderson was an actress with the Front Street Repertory Theatre in downtown Memphis, and debuted professionally in Memphis with the Southwestern University Players. Later, she acted with the Los Angeles Art Theatre.

== Television ==
Anderson decided to move to Los Angeles. In 1966, one of her first TV appearances came in a first-season episode of Star Trek, "The Conscience of the King", as Lenore Karidian.

She premiered her Eve Whitfield character in the March 1967 Ironside TV movie, and continued the role when the series debuted in September. That same week in September, she had a featured role in the first episode of the TV series Mannix.

Anderson was one of the four original cast members of Ironside and was the lead actress in the series for the first 105 episodes. Anderson played the role of one of two police officers chosen to assist Robert Ironside (Raymond Burr), former chief of detectives for San Francisco, after he lost the use of his legs due to a shooting. Anderson continued in her role as Officer Whitfield for four seasons. For her role on the show, she won the Primetime Emmy Award for Outstanding Supporting Actress in a Drama Series in 1968.

Her later performances include the wife of a man who inherits a notoriously haunted house in the Night Gallery episode "Fright Night" and as a witness to a mob hit in the Harry O episode "Material Witness". She accepted a recurring role (seven episodes) in the final season of Mission: Impossible, taking over parts that were originally written for regular cast member Lynda Day George while George was on maternity leave. Anderson later declared the Mission: Impossible role some of the best work she had ever done, and George agreed: "She did a terrific job".

Anderson continued to work, though, accepting supporting roles in several TV movies, including 1977's You Lie So Deep, My Love (where she was reunited with former Ironside co-star Don Galloway). She also accepted guest roles on popular TV shows of the period including The Love Boat, Wonder Woman, and Marcus Welby, M.D. In 1993, Anderson reunited with her former Ironside co-stars for the TV movie Return of Ironside, reprising her role as Eve Whitfield, now the mother of a daughter.

== Personal life ==
In 1971, Anderson married actor and, later, successful stockbroker, Don Burnett and left the TV series Ironside to devote time to her marriage.

In 2023, thirty years after withdrawing from public life, she spoke at length about her career and personal life as set forth in the book Barbara Anderson Forever... by French author Patrick Loubatière.

== Filmography ==
Year	Title	Role	Notes
1966	The Virginian	Sarah Crayton	Episode: "The Challenge"
1966	Jericho	Corporal Victoria Bannon	Episode: "Four O'Clock Bomb to London"
1966	Star Trek: The Original Series	Lenore	S1:E13, "The Conscience of the King"
1966–1967	The Road West	Susan Douglass / Barbara	2 episodes: "Pariah" and "Never Chase a Rainbow"
1967	Laredo	Della Snilly	Episode: "The Other Cheek"
1967	Ironside	Eve Whitfield	Television film
1967	Mannix	Angela Dubrio	Episode: "The Name Is Mannix"
1967–1971	Insight	Kathy	3 episodes
1967–1971	Ironside	Officer Eve Whitfield	Main role, 105 episodes
1970	Paris 7000	Lee / Ellen	2 episodes: ""Call Me Lee" and "Call Me Ellen"
1970	The Red Skelton Show	Rick's Moll	Episode: "Freddie's Desperate Hour"
1970–1974	Marcus Welby, M.D.	Julie Haynes / Marcy	2 episodes
1972	Mission: Impossible	Mimi Davis	7 episodes
1972	Visions of Death	Susan Schaeffer	Television film
1972	Night Gallery	Leona Ogilvy	Episode: "Fright Night"
1973	The Six Million Dollar Man	Jean Manners	(Television film) Season 1/Episode 1 & 2 - The Moon and the Desert
1973	Don't Be Afraid of the Dark	Joan Kahn	Television film
1973	Medical Center	Betty	Episode: "The Casualty"
1973	The Wide World of Mystery	Maggie Clark	Episode: "Murder and the Computer"
1974	Owen Marshall, Counselor at Law	Carol	Episode: "To Keep and Bear Arms"
1974	Strange Homecoming	Elaine Halsey	Television film
1974	Harry O	Dr. Noelle Kira	Episode: "Material Witness"
1975	Amy Prentiss	Lenore	Episode: "Profile in Evil"
1975	Police Story	Rita Wagner	Episode: "To Steal a Million"
1975	You Lie So Deep, My Love	Susan Collins	Television film
1975	The Invisible Man	Paula Simon	Episode: "Eyes Only"
1977	Gibbsville		Episode: "Manhood"
1977	Wonder Woman	Maggie Robbins	Episode: "Last of the $2 Bills"
1977	SST: Death Flight	Carla Stanley	Television film
1977	Switch	Dana Wallace	Episode: "Net Loss"
1978	Doctors' Private Lives	Frances Latimer	Television film
1978	The Love Boat	Karen Williamson	Episode: "Ship of Ghouls"
1979	Hawaii Five-O	Dorothy Meighan	Episode: "The Meighan Conspiracy"
1982	Star of the Family		Episode: "Save My Life, Please"
1983	Simon & Simon	Celeste Dunn	Episode: "Design for Killing"
1988	Bonanza: The Next Generation	Annabelle 'Annie' Cartwright	Television film
1993	The Return of Ironside	Eve Whitfield	Television film

== Awards and nominations ==
Year	Association	Category	Work	Result	Ref.
1968	Primetime Emmy Awards	Outstanding Supporting Actress in a Drama Series	Ironside	Won	
1969	Primetime Emmy Awards	Outstanding Supporting Actress in a Drama Series	Ironside	Nominated	
1970	Primetime Emmy Awards	Outstanding Supporting Actress in a Drama Series	Ironside	Nominated	
