= Cy Chermak =

American producer and screenwriter (1929–2021)

- Born: Seymour Chermak; September 20, 1929; Bayonne, New Jersey, U.S.
- Died: January 29, 2021 (aged 91); Honolulu, Hawaii, U.S.
- Occupations: Producer, screenwriter
- Years active: 1940s–2021
- Spouse: Francine Carroll (m. 1955; died. 2007)
- Children: 3

Seymour "Cy" Chermak (September 20, 1929 – January 29, 2021) was an American producer and screenwriter. He is best known for producing CHiPs, Ironside, and Kolchak: The Night Stalker.

== Career ==
Chermak started his career at the age of 17.

From 1950 - 1954, Chermak was head writer for the new DuMont Television Network crime drama television series Rocky King Detective. He wrote the screenplay for the 1959 film 4D Man with Theodore Simonson.

In 1967, he became an executive producer for the new NBC crime drama television series Ironside.

In 1971, Chermak was nominated for a Primetime Emmy for his work on Ironside. He would go on to write and produce several television programs, including Kolchak: The Night Stalker, Barbary Coast, Murder at the World Series, and spinoff television series Amy Prentiss. In 1978, he became a producer for the new NBC series CHiPs. He would go on to produce 125 episodes of the show.

In 1998, Chermak was a screenwriter for the television film Rescuers: Stories of Courage: Two Families. He wrote the script with his wife, Francine Carroll, for which they were nominated for a Writers Guild of America Award.

In 2016, Chermak wrote the book The Show Runner: An Insider's Guide to Successful Television Production.

== Death ==
Chermak died on January 29, 2021, at the age of 91, at his home in Honolulu, Hawaii, of natural causes.
