= Julia Pace Mitchell =

American actress (born 1978)

- Born: Julia Annette Mitchell; February 10, 1978 (age 48); Los Angeles, California, U.S.
- Education: Howard University (BFA); National Theatre Conservatory (MFA)
- Occupation: Actress
- Years active: 2003–present
- Children: 1
- Parents: Don Mitchell (father); Judy Pace (mother)

Julia Pace Mitchell (born Julia Annette Mitchell; February 10, 1978) is an American stage, television and film actress. She is best known for her role as Sofia Dupre on the CBS television soap opera The Young and the Restless (2010–12, 2019).

== Personal life ==
Pace Mitchell is the daughter of former screen and TV actress Judy Pace and actor Don Mitchell. She attended Hamilton High School Music Academy and graduated from Howard University with a BFA. On May 22, 2013, at Atrium Medical Center, Middletown, Ohio, Pace-Mitchell gave birth to her first child, Stephen L. Hightower III.

== Career ==
Pace Mitchell played the role of Jan in The Notorious B.I.G. biopic, Notorious, opposite newcoming actor Jamal Woolard who plays the title character. She appeared on the soap opera The Young and the Restless as business executive Sofia Dupre. Her first appearance was July 19, 2010. In September 2012, Mitchell was taken off her contract and bumped to recurring. She made a return in 2019. She is now a recurring guest star on the CBS show Young Sheldon and the BET+ show All The Queens Men.

== Filmography ==
=== Film ===
Year	Title	Role	Notes
2003	Keisha vs. Geisha	Keisha	Short film
2007	Meet Bill	Dana	
2009	Notorious	Jan Jackson	
2010	Faster	Cashier	
2017	Weirdos Welcome	Mrs. Radner	Short film Assistant director
2022	Fall	Diner Server	Credited as Julia Mitchell

=== Television ===
Year	Title	Role	Notes
2003	Strong Medicine	Kyra	Episode: "Temperatures Rising"
2004	Law & Order	Dr. Hass	Episode: "The Dead Wives Club"
2006	Law & Order: Special Victims Unit	Bank Teller	Episode: "Blast"
2008	Cold Case	Ella Turner '64	Episode: "Wednesday's Women"
2010	The Hard Times of RJ Berger	Sharice (voice)	Episode: "The Rebound"
2010–2012; 2019	The Young and the Restless	Sofia Dupre	Recurring role; 114 episodes
2019–2022	Bad Boy	Jamila	Recurring role; 6 episodes
2019–2020	Airport Security Squad	Cindy	Main role; 8 episodes
2020	Fired		Episode: "Security Guard"
2020–2023	Young Sheldon	Darlene Wilkins	Recurring role; 4 episodes
2021–2023	All the Queen's Men	Ms. Patty	Recurring role; 13 episodes

== Awards and nominations ==
Year	Award	Work	Result	Ref
2011	NAACP Image Award for Outstanding Actress in a Daytime Drama Series	The Young and the Restless	Nominated	
2012	NAACP Image Award for Outstanding Actress in a Daytime Drama Series	The Young and the Restless	Nominated	
2013	NAACP Image Award for Outstanding Actress in a Daytime Drama Series	The Young and the Restless	Nominated	
