= Judy Pace =

American actress (1942–2026)

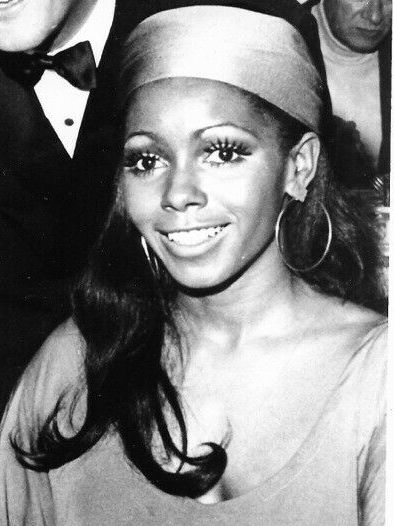
- Pace in 1970
- Born: Judy Lenteen Pace; June 15, 1942; Los Angeles, California, U.S.
- Died: March 11, 2026 (aged 83); Marina Del Rey, California, U.S.
- Resting place: Inglewood Park Cemetery, Inglewood, California, U.S.
- Education: Los Angeles City College
- Occupation: Actress
- Years active: 1963–2017
- Known for: Peyton Place; The Young Lawyers
- Spouses: Don Mitchell (m. 1972; div. 1984) Curt Flood (m. 1986; died 1997)
- Children: 2; including Julia Pace Mitchell
- Awards: Image Award Outstanding Actress in a Drama Series The Young Lawyers (1970)

Judy Lenteen Pace (June 15, 1942 – March 11, 2026) was an American actress known for her roles in films and television shows, particularly blaxploitation films. Pace portrayed Vickie Fletcher on the TV series Peyton Place (1968–1969) and Pat Walters on the ABC drama series The Young Lawyers (1970–1971), for which she won an NAACP Image Award for Outstanding Actress in a Drama Series in 1970.

== Early life and career ==
Pace was born in Los Angeles, California, on June 15, 1942, to an airplane mechanic and a dressmaker. After graduation from Dorsey High School, Pace attended Los Angeles City College, majoring in sociology.

She made her film debut as one of the title characters in William Castle's 13 Frightened Girls (1963). She got her first major break in Hollywood in 1968 as the first black villainess on TV with her role as Vickie Fletcher in the hit ABC-TV soap-opera/drama series Peyton Place. Also in 1968, Pace was singled out for praise by noted film critic Roger Ebert, for her performance in the popular youth-oriented film, Three in the Attic:

The find in this movie, for my money, is the young black actress Judy Pace, who is terrific. Variety calls her "the most beautiful black actress in Hollywood," which is debatable since beauty is in the eye of the beholder, etc., but she's a quick, funny actress who can put an edge on a line and keep a scene sparkling.

Pace quickly became a familiar face in the 1970s on both the big and small screens, appearing in popular blaxploitation movies and popular television shows. She appeared on television shows including Batman, Tarzan, Bewitched, I Dream of Jeannie, The Flying Nun, Days of Our Lives, I Spy, Ironside, Peyton Place, The Mod Squad, Medical Center, That's My Mama, O'Hara, US Treasury, The New People, Insight, Kung Fu, Shaft, Caribe, Sanford and Son, What's Happening!!, and Good Times.

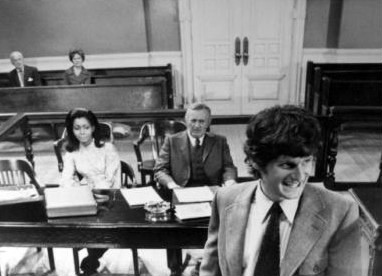
Cast of ABC TV series The Young Lawyers (1970), from left: Pace, Lee J. Cobb (both seated) and Zalman King

For one season, she starred in the drama The Young Lawyers, broadcast on ABC. She also had a key supporting role as Gale Sayers's wife, Linda, in the critically acclaimed 1971 ABC-TV movie Brian's Song.

== Personal life and death ==
In 1972, Pace married actor Don Mitchell. They had two daughters together before their divorce in 1984. Their daughters are actress Julia Pace Mitchell and Shawn Meshelle Mitchell. Pace had been courted by former baseball player Curt Flood in 1966, when he saw her as a bachelorette contestant on the game show The Dating Game. They dated until 1970. After divorcing Mitchell in 1984, Pace and Flood met again, leading to their 1986 marriage. They remained together until Flood's death in 1997.

Pace died in her sleep on March 11, 2026, while visiting her family in Marina del Rey, at the age of 83. She was interred at Inglewood Park Cemetery.

== Filmography ==
As actress:

- 13 Frightened Girls (1963)
- I Spy (1966)
- The Fortune Cookie (1966) as Elvira
- Batman (1966)
- Bewitched (1966)
- Days of Our Lives (1967)
- The Flying Nun (1967)
- I Dream of Jeannie (1967)
- Three in the Attic (1968)
- The Mod Squad (1968)
- The Thomas Crown Affair (1968) as Pretty Girl
- Tarzan (1968)
- Peyton Place (1968–1969)
- The New People (TV movie) (1969)
- The Young Lawyers (TV series) (1970–1971)
- Up in the Cellar (1970)
- Cotton Comes to Harlem (1970) as Iris Brown
- Brian's Song (1971) as Linda Sayers
- O'Hara, U.S. Treasury (1971)
- Cool Breeze (1972) as Obalese Eaton
- Oh, Nurse! (1972 TV movie)
- Frogs (1972)
- Shaft (TV series) (1973)
- The Slams (1973) as Iris Daniels
- Ironside (1974)
- That's My Mama (1974)
- Sanford and Son (1974)
- Kung Fu (1974)
- Medical Center (1974)
- Good Times (1975)
- Caribe (1975)
- What's Happening!!!! (two episodes, 1977–1979)
- Beyond Westworld (1980)
- Sucker Free City (2004)
- Beauty and the Baller (four episodes, 2017)

As herself:

- Stevie Wonder/The Moments/Fully Guaranteed (1973) (TV episode)
- Soul Train (1973)
- Christopher Jones (1999)
- E! True Hollywood Story (1999)
- Curt Flood (2000) (TV episode)
- ESPN SportsCentury (two episodes, 2000–2004)
- Disciples of Jackie Robinson (2004) (TV episode)
