= Shelly Novack =

American football player and actor (1944–1978)

- Novack in Most Wanted, 1977
- Born: Sheldon Lennard Novack; January 10, 1944; Los Angeles County, California, U.S.
- Died: May 27, 1978 (aged 34); Santa Monica, California, U.S.
- Resting place: Hillside Memorial Park Cemetery
- Education: Santa Monica City College; California State University, Long Beach
- Occupations: Football player, actor
- Years active: 1964–1978
- Spouse: Colleen Belle Johnson (m. 1973–1978)
- Children: 1

Sheldon Lennard "Shelly" Novack (January 10, 1944 – May 27, 1978) was an American college football player for the Long Beach State 49ers. He was selected by the San Diego Chargers in the 15th round (135th pick overall) of the 1966 American Football League draft. After his retirement as a football player, Novack became an actor in both television and film.

== Football career ==
=== Scholastic football ===
Novack was an all-league and special mention Junior College All-American at Santa Monica City College (class of 1963), and first-team All-American at Long Beach State in 1964 and 1965.

=== Professional football ===
In November 1965, Novack was drafted as a wide receiver by the American Football League (AFL) San Diego Chargers. He was the 135th pick in the 1966 AFL draft, but never played in a regular season game.

After two seasons in San Diego, Novack met Universal Studios acting coach Vincent Chase while playing in a touch football league during the offseason. Chase invited Novack to a meeting at the studios, which led to Novack embarking on an acting career.

== Acting career ==
In 1968, Novack made his screen debut in the Hallmark Hall of Fame television film A Punt, a Pass, and a Prayer. He went on to appear in guest roles on television shows such as Ironside, Police Story, The Streets of San Francisco, Quincy, M.E., The Virginian and The Love Boat.

Novack was a regular on the Quinn Martin-produced TV shows The F.B.I. (1973–74) and Most Wanted. In addition to television, he performed in a few theatrical film releases, including Johnny Finney in 1969's Tell Them Willie Boy Is Here; and Rolling, the cockpit mechanic who assists in moving the stranded jet, in 1970's Airport.

In 1977, Novack won the very first Toyota Grand Prix pro-celebrity race.

== Death ==
On May 27, 1978, Novack died of a heart attack in Santa Monica, California at age 34. He is interred in the Hillside Memorial Park Cemetery in Culver City, California.

== Screen appearances ==
Year	Title	Role	Notes
1967–1970	The Virginian	Various roles	5 episodes
1968	A Punt, a Pass, and a Prayer	Barney	Television movie
1968–1974	Ironside	Various roles	5 episodes
1969	The Outsider	Edward Potolski	Episode: "Service for One"
1969	The Bold Ones: The New Doctors	H.P. Leader	Episode: "The Rebellion of the Body"
1969	Willie Boy	Johnny Finney	
1969	Tell Them Willie Boy Is Here	Johnny Finney	
1969–1970	The Name of the Game	Various roles	3 episodes
1970	The Forty-Eight Hour Mile		Television movie
1970	McCloud	James Waldron	Episode: "Portrait of a Dead Girl"
1970	Airport	Rolling	
1970	Gunsmoke	Adam Bramley	Episode: "Stark"
1970	The Intruders	Theron Pardo	Television movie shot in 1967
1971	Dan August	Matt Lawrence	Episode: "Days of Rage"
1971	The Mod Squad	Ed Kelton	Episode: "The Sands of Anger"
1971	The D.A.		Episode: "The People versus Boley"
1971	Cade's County	Earl Grimes	Episode: "Inferno"
1972	Emergency!	Vern Hammond	Episode: "Hang-Up"
1972	Kansas City Bomber	Fan	
1972	The Rookies	Cody	Episode: "Concrete Valley, Neon Sky"
1972	Banyon		Episode: "The Old College Try"
1972–1975	Medical Center	Various roles	3 episodes
1972–1976	The Streets of San Francisco	Various roles	2 episodes
1973	Circle of Fear	Art	Episode: "Dark Vengeance"
1973	The Letters	Sonny	Television movie
1973	The Delphi Bureau	Carson	Episode: "The Self-Destruct Project"
1973	Toke		
1973–1974	Kung Fu	Various roles	2 episodes
1973–1974	The F.B.I.	Agent Chris Daniels	23 episodes
1974	Kolchak: The Night Stalker	York	Episode: "Horror in the Heights"
1974–1977	Police Story	Various roles	7 episodes
1975	The Desperate Miles	Lou	Television movie
1975	Cop on the Beat	Henderson	Television movie
1975	Medical Story	Jerry	Television movie
1975	Hawaii Five-O	Officer Oliver MacDougall	Episode: "Sing a Song of Suspense"
1975	Barnaby Jones	Ralph Forester	Episode: "Portrait of Evil"
1975	Switch	Strayhorn	Episode: "Mistresses, Murderers and Millions"
1976	Bert D'Angelo/Superstar	Bobby Cox	Episode: "Murder In Velvet"
1976	Good Heavens	Andy Reed	Episode: "Take Me Out to the Ball Game"
1976	Vigilante Force	D.O. Viner	
1976	The Hardy Boys/Nancy Drew Mysteries	Wally Siebert	Episode: "Wipe-Out"
1976–1977	Most Wanted	Sgt. Charlie Benson	22 episodes
1977	The Love Boat	Brad Brockway	Episode: "The Captain and the Lady/One If by Land/Centerfold"
1977	Quincy, M.E.	Ben	Episode: "The Hero Syndrome"
1978	Superdome	Peter Brooks	Television movie
1978	Love's Dark Ride	Karl Sears	Television movie, (final film role)
