= Elizabeth Baur =

American actress (1947–2017)

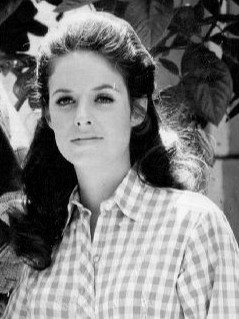
- Baur in Lancer, 1968
- Born: December 11, 1947; Los Angeles, California, U.S.
- Died: September 30, 2017 (aged 69); Los Angeles, California, U.S.
- Occupation: Actress
- Years active: 1968–1993
- Spouses: Eugene Worton (m. 1976; div. 1985) Steven Springer (m. 1989)
- Relatives: Sharon Gless (cousin)

Elizabeth Baur (December 11, 1947 – September 30, 2017) was an American actress. She is known for her roles as Teresa O'Brien on the CBS western series Lancer, and as Officer Fran Belding on NBC's crime drama series Ironside.

== Early life ==
Baur was born on December 11, 1947, in Los Angeles. Juanita Gless, her great-grandmother, was an early settler of California who came from the Basque region of France. Actress Sharon Gless is Baur's first cousin.

Her father, Jack Baur, was a veteran casting director at 20th Century Fox, and did not want his daughter in the industry.

She attended Immaculate Heart High School in Los Angeles.

== Education ==
Baur attended Los Angeles Valley College "for a year and three-quarters." Baur left college to join a 20th Century Fox program for training actors.

== Career ==
After actress Barbara Anderson left NBC's Ironside after four seasons, Baur was hired as her replacement. Baur told a reporter in 1972: "They interviewed 100 girls for this role. Then they had 14 of us come in and read for the part. Finally they gave seven of us screen tests. I was really surprised they chose me." Two years later, she said, "Officer Fran Belding is the hardest part I've ever had to play, because she's so straight, so normal."

Baur and Anderson would both appear in the 1993 TV reunion movie The Return of Ironside. Baur reprised her role of Fran Belding alongside her former co-stars Raymond Burr, Don Galloway and Don Mitchell.

== Personal life ==
Baur's first marriage was to Eugene Worton in 1976, and they had one daughter together, producer Lesley Worton, before they divorced in 1985. Her second marriage was to Steven Springer, in 1989.

Baur died on September 30, 2017, after a lengthy illness at the age of 69.

== Filmography ==
Film
Year	Title	Role	Notes
1968	The Boston Strangler	Harriet Fordin	
Television
Year	Title	Role	Notes
1968	Batman	Fourth Policewoman	Episode: "Nora Clavicle and the Ladies' Crime Club"
1968–1970	Lancer	Teresa O'Brien	51 episodes
1970	Daniel Boone	Virginia	Episode: "Noblesse Oblige"
1970	The Young Rebels	Rachel	Episode: "The Infiltrator"
1971	Room 222	Meaghan	Episode: "Cheating"
1971	Nanny and the Professor	Susan Baxter	Episode: "The Communication Gap"
1971–1975	Ironside	Fran Belding	89 episodes
1972	The Bold Ones: The New Doctors	Fran Belding	Episode: "Five Days in the Death of Sgt. Brown: Part II" (crossover appearance)
1972	Emergency!	Sister Barbara	Episode: "Saddled"
1975	S.W.A.T.	Dr. Ellen Benton	Episode: "Silent Night, Deadly Night"
1977	ABC Weekend Specials	Annabel	Episode: "Valentine's Second Chance"
1978	Police Woman	Joslyn Westmore	Episode: "Flip of a Coin"
1981	Fantasy Island	Lucy Carson	Episode: "The Man from Yesterday/World's Most Desirable Woman"
1984	Remington Steele	Margie Kelsey	Episode: "Second Base Steele"
1993	The Return of Ironside	Fran Belding	TV movie, (final film role)
