= Most Wanted (1976 TV series) =

- Genre: Crime drama
- Created by: Laurence Heath
- Written by: Robert Janes; Larry Heath
- Directed by: Walter Grauman; Richard Lang; Leslie H. Martinson; Virgil W. Vogel
- Starring: Robert Stack
- Composers: Lalo Schifrin (pilot); Richard Markowitz (1.2); Patrick Williams; Duane Tatro
- Country of origin: United States
- Original language: English
- No. of seasons: 1
- No. of episodes: 21

Production
- Producer: Quinn Martin
- Running time: 60 minutes
- Production company: QM Productions

Original release
- Network: ABC
- Release: October 16, 1976 – August 20, 1977

Most Wanted is an American crime drama television series shown on ABC from October 16, 1976, until August 20, 1977. It stars Robert Stack, Jo Ann Harris, Shelly Novack, and Hari Rhodes. The series was created by Laurence Heath, aka Leonard Heideman, a successful and prolific writer/producer who several years earlier was institutionalized for murdering his wife. This program marks the reunion of series star Stack with producer Quinn Martin, who had worked together previously on the ABC crime series The Untouchables.

== Overview ==
The series focused on an elite task force of the Los Angeles Police Department named "Most Wanted". The mayor of Los Angeles, Dan Stoddard (Hari Rhodes), created the force to concentrate exclusively on criminals on the mayor's most-wanted list. In bringing them together, Mayor Stoddard specified "As few people as possible", and that their motto would be "Brainpower instead of manpower—focus instead of force". Captain Linc Evers (Stack) headed the force accompanied by his two assistants (Harris and Novack) who used undercover tactics to bring down the city's most wanted and dangerous criminals. The series' original pilot featured a fourth member, played by Tom Selleck, but he was not used for the series. Actress Leslie Charleson was in the pilot as the female member of the unit, but was replaced in the series by Harris.

According to Robert Stack in his autobiography Straight Shooting, Most Wanted had become a top 10 Nielsen ratings hit, but was cancelled by ABC due to network politics after one season.

The theme song was composed by Lalo Schifrin and later used by the Sunburst Band for the house song "New York City Woman".

Most Wanted follows the same structure as other Quinn Martin dramas, including four labeled acts and an epilogue. However, the opening does not feature an announcer or pictures of that episode's guest stars (just their names are displayed), though the "tonight's episode" features a picture of that episode's enemy or key figure.

== Cast ==
- Robert Stack as Captain Linc Evers
- Hari Rhodes as Mayor Dan Stoddard
- Shelly Novack as Sergeant Charlie Benson
- Jo Ann Harris as Officer Kate Manners

== Episodes ==
| No. | Title | Original release date |
|---|---|---|
| 1 | "The Skykiller" | October 16, 1976 |
| 2 | "The Slaver" | October 23, 1976 |
| 3 | "The Corrupter" | October 30, 1976 |
| 4 | "The Two Dollar Kidnappers" | November 6, 1976 |
| 5 | "The Wolf Pack Killer" | November 20, 1976 |
| 6 | "The Heisman Killer" | November 27, 1976 |
| 7 | "The Torch" | December 18, 1976 |
| 8 | "The Ten-Percenter" | December 25, 1976 |
| 9 | "The White Collar Killer" | January 1, 1977 |
| 10 | "Ms. Murder" | January 8, 1977 |
| 11 | "The Pirate" | January 15, 1977 |
| 12 | "The Hit Men" | February 5, 1977 |
| 13 | "The Ritual Killer" | February 12, 1977 |
| 14 | "The Tunnel Killer" | February 19, 1977 |
| 15 | "The Parasite" | February 26, 1977 |
| 16 | "The Spellbinder" | March 7, 1977 |
| 17 | "The Driver" | March 14, 1977 |
| 18 | "The Insider" | March 21, 1977 |
| 19 | "The People Mover" | April 25, 1977 |
| 20 | "The Death Dealer" | August 13, 1977 |
| 21 | "The Dutchman" | August 20, 1977 |

== Home media ==
On March 20, 2018, CBS Home Entertainment released the Complete Series on DVD in Region 1. This is a Manufacture-on-Demand (MOD) release, available from Amazon.com through their CreateSpace MOD program and other online retailers.
