= The Young Lawyers =

American television legal drama

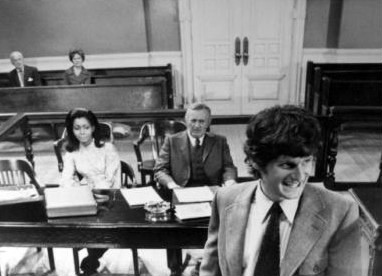
- Judy Pace, Lee J. Cobb, and Zalman King, 1970
- Genre: Legal drama
- Created by: Michael Zagor
- Written by: John W. Bloch; Harlan Ellison; Mel Goldberg; Joyce Perry; Robert Sabaroff; Guerdon Trueblood; Ed Waters; Michael Zagor
- Directed by: Harvey Hart; Gene Levitt; John Newland; Jud Taylor
- Starring: Lee J. Cobb; Zalman King; Judy Pace; Phillip Clark
- Composers: Lalo Schifrin; Leith Stevens
- Country of origin: United States
- Original language: English
- No. of seasons: 1
- No. of episodes: 24

Production
- Producers: William P. D'Angelo; Herbert Hirschman; Matthew Rapf
- Running time: 60 minutes
- Production companies: Crane Productions Inc. Paramount Television

Original release
- Network: ABC
- Release: September 21, 1970 – March 24, 1971

The Young Lawyers is an American legal drama that was aired on the ABC network for one season from September 21, 1970, until March 24, 1971. Starring Lee J. Cobb, Zalman King, Judy Pace and Phillip Clark, the show was a part of the network's 1970–71 lineup.

== Plot ==
Aaron Silverman is part of a group of young, idealistic students at a top Boston law school who open a legal aid center, the "Neighborhood Law Office," to help the poor. As these young students have not yet been admitted to the bar, they receive guidance from established Boston lawyer David Barrett.

== Cast ==
- Lee J. Cobb as David Barrett
- Zalman King as Aaron Silverman
- Judy Pace as Pat Walters
- Phillip Clark as Chris Blake

== Episodes ==
No.	Title	Directed by	Written by	Original release date
TV–Movie	"The Young Lawyers"	Harvey Hart	Michael Zagor	October 28, 1969
Attorney Michael Cannon (Jason Evers) leaves his Boston law firm to become director of the Neighborhood Law Office, where he guides three law students on a case involving two visiting musicians accused of robbing and beating up a cab driver. Michael Parks, Richard Pryor, Anjanette Comer, Judy Pace, Zalman King, and Keenan Wynn also star.
1	"Is There a Good Samaritan in the House?"	John Newland	William P. McGivern	September 21, 1970
After letting off some steam, intern Dr. Vince Sabowski (Frank Converse) drives by a car accident. He pulls a boy from the car against the express wishes of the boy's father. When sued for ignoring the father, he goes to the legal clinic for help. Gordon Pinsent and David Sheiner guest star.
2	"A Simple Thing Called Justice"	Jud Taylor	Arthur Sarno Jr. & David W. Rintels	September 28, 1970
A teenage boy comes to Aaron's office, begging for him to take the case of his older brother, who is serving time for second degree murder after a plea bargaining agreement. The boy insists his brother is totally innocent, but the lawyer who represented him is a well respected civil rights attorney who has since been appointed a judge. John Larch, Paul Winfield and Michael Lembeck guest star.
3	"The Two Dollar Thing"	John Newland	Lionel E. Siegel	October 5, 1970
The firm defends a young unmarried couple who are in danger of losing custody of their young son because of their refusal to get married and the condition of the apartment they are sharing with several other unconventional young people. Peter Strauss, Joy Bang, Joan Delaney, James Sikking and Russ Conway guest star.
4	"The Alienation Kick"	Jud Taylor	Story by : Lee Kalcheim; Teleplay by : Jack Guss & Lee Kalcheim	October 12, 1970
A runaway teenage girl comes to the law office and begs Aaron's help in getting her away from the custody of her mother and stepfather. Ford Rainey, Mary Layne, Kim Hunter and Gwynne Gilford guest star.
5	"Where's Aaron?"	John Newland	Norman Katkov	October 19, 1970
Aaron goes up against a landlord who is refusing to provide necessary repairs to his tenants, people Aaron grew up with. He also has to deal with Barrett, who is questioning whether the law is really the field Aaron wants for himself. Russ Conway, Squire Fridell, Phillip Pine, Jonathan Goldsmith, Johnny Haymer and Richard Eastham guest star.
6	"We May Be Better Strangers"	Jud Taylor	Story by : Theodore Apstein; Teleplay by : Theodore Apstein & Jack Guss	October 26, 1970
Aaron is appointed to defend young Dan Fulton (John Rubinstein), who is charged with possession after marijuana is found in his car on a traffic stop. Dan's father (Tim O'Connor) insists that he pled guilty, but Dan refuses, insisting on his innocence. Marsha Hunt, John David Carson and Sam Melville guest star.
7	"The Glass Prison"	Jud Taylor	John W. Bloch	November 2, 1970
Aaron runs into one of his first clients, who is still bitter with him for failing to successfully defend him from drug possession charges. The young musician, now out on parole, still maintains his innocence, and Aaron is shocked by the conditions of his parole: he cannot associate with any other musicians or associate with any drug addicts--even his own wife. Pete Duel, Harry Townes, Barbara Luna and Vic Tayback guest star
8	"The Russell Incident"	John Newland	Story by : Guerdon Trueblood; Teleplay by : Stephen Kandel	November 9, 1970
The wife of a young cop asks Aaron to take the case of her husband, who's been charged with beating a suspect. Aaron is reluctant, but soon agrees to defend the officer, who is unwilling to tell the full story for fear of going against his partner, whom he idolizes. Gerald S. O'Loughlin, Geoffrey Lewis, Lee Bergere, Michael Pataki, and Jim McMullan guest star.
9	"At the Edge of the Night"	Jud Taylor	Alvin Sapinsley	November 16, 1970
Aaron is assigned to assist the district attorney, and one of his first cases there involves a man charged with damage to property and injuring a bystander. But Aaron feels the young man is potentially dangerous and that he should either receive a harsher sentence or get psychiatric help. Robert F. Lyons, Angela Clarke, Curt Lowens and Tod Andrews guest star.
10	"Are You Running with Me, Jimmy?"	John Newland	Barry Oringer	November 23, 1970
Aaron takes the case of a young minister (Martin Sheen) who is fighting efforts by the child protective services to take away the ten orphaned children he has been taking care of and place them in separate foster homes. Fearing he may lose, the minister soon pulls out of the suit and makes a deal with the agency, but the kids have other ideas and still want to fight to stay together. Paul Fix, Gary Dubin and John Lupton guest star.
11	"A Busload of Bishops"	Jud Taylor	Story by : Arnold & Lois Peyser; Teleplay by : Arnold & Lois Peyser and Jack Guss	November 30, 1970
Aaron defends a high school basketball star against charges of vandalism and assault on a custodian. But his biggest obstacle may be not the prosecution but the school, and the boy's sister, who are so determined that he go on to a college scholarship that it casts doubt on their testimonies in his favor. Oscar DeGruy, Paula Kelly, Simon Oakland and Antoinette Bower guest star.
12	"The Legacy of Miles Turner"	John Newland	Story by : Ian Chevron; Teleplay by : Alvin Sapinsley	December 7, 1970
Aaron is assigned to assist the district attorney, and one of his first cases there involves a man charged with damage to property and injuring a bystander. But Aaron feels the young man is potentially dangerous and that he should either receive a harsher sentence or get psychiatric help. Tim McIntire, David Sheiner, Peter Donat and Charlotte Stewart guest star.
13	"Remember Chris Gately?"	Jud Taylor	Story by : Joyce Perry; Teleplay by : Ed Waters	December 14, 1970
A former law school classmate of Aaron's, now working at a community action group, shows up at his apartment with a bullet wound. She claims she was shot by the city building inspector who was breaking into her group's office, though it turns out she was shot by her own gun. Aaron takes her case even though her story seems too far-fetched to be believed. Flora Plumb, Larry Linville and Whit Bissell guest star.
14	"MacGillicuddy Always Was a Pain in the Neck"	John Newland	Story by : A.A. Sundri; Teleplay by : Wilton Schiller	December 21, 1970
Though he admits to not liking the man, Aaron decides to defend an unpopular older apartment dweller (Edmond O'Brien) against his fellow tenants and landlord, who want to evict him. Jess Walton, Alan Vint, Carmen Argenziano, Dabbs Greer and Vincent Van Patten guest star.
15	"False Witness"	Jud Taylor	Story by : Bob & Wanda Duncan; Teleplay by : Bob & Wanda Duncan and Jack Guss	January 4, 1971
Despite Barrett's misgivings, Aaron believes and is determined to defend a former client (Brenda Scott) who now is accused of petty theft from the couple she was working for. He believes she is being set up, with the help of a young man she claims to have helped escape to Canada to evade the draft. Robert Webber, John Kerr and Russ Conway guest star.
16	"Legal Maneuver"	Jud Taylor	Richard DeLong Adams	January 20, 1971
Aaron is assigned to work with a famous and flamboyant defense attorney who is defending two young people for murder. Though he resents it at first when the prosecutor tries to get him to separate the female defendant's trial from the male's, Aaron soon feels differently about this after he learns of evidence which would clearly establish the young woman's innocence. But both she and the defense attorney are unwilling to agree to separate trials. Eli Wallach, Lynn Loring, Peter Mark Richman and Ford Rainey guest star.
17	"The Outspoken Silence"	Jud Taylor	Robert Van Scoyk	February 3, 1971
Aaron defends an old friend from law school who was found with dynamite in a box in his house. He claims the box was not his, and has a witness who can vouch for him, but when Aaron finds out she is lying for him, it takes the case in a tragic new direction. Scott Glenn, Kelly Jean Peters and Pat Hingle guest star.
18	"The Victims"	John Newland	Story by : L.T. Bentwood; Teleplay by : L.T. Bentwood & Stephen Kandel	February 10, 1971
Chris Blake (Philip Clark) is threatened with a suit for allegedly encouraging the editors of a high school student newspaper to discuss sexual matters. But things get even worse when one of the students working on the paper accuses Chris of rape, and claims that he is the father of her unborn baby. Meredith Baxter, David Lewis, Michael Strong, Martha Hyer and Tol Avery guest star.
19	"The Bradbury War"	John Newland	Stephen Kandel	February 17, 1971
Aaron finds himself taking on more than he bargained for when he agrees to represent a young woman (Janet Margolin) who wants to divorce her husband (John Beck). Russell Johnson, Katherine MacGregor and James Hong guest star.
20	"And the Walls Came Tumbling Down"	John Newland	Story by : Charles E. Israel; Teleplay by : Charles E. Israel & Robert Van Scoyk	February 24, 1971
At the request of the girl's mother, the law office takes the case of a young woman accused of killing the womanizing pop singer who abruptly told her their relationship was over. The girl admits shooting him, but as more comes to light it becomes clear that is not the whole story. Katherine Cannon, Nan Martin, Ray Danton, Kevin Hagen and Sam Edwards guest star.
21	"Down at the House of Truth, Visiting"	John Newland	Story by : Robert Sabaroff & Sheldon Stark; Teleplay by : Robert Sabaroff	March 3, 1971
A young man is charged with car theft, although he insists he bought the car from a dealer. But the dealer and the salesman deny ever meeting the young man. Aaron realizes something shady is going on with the dealership, but can he prove it? Richard Dreyfuss, Lane Bradbury, Paul Stevens, Jon Lormer, and Tom Drake guest star.
22	"The Whimper of Whipped Dogs"	Jud Taylor	Harlan Ellison	March 10, 1971
Aaron gets a call from a former girlfriend (Susan Strasberg), who has become a heroin addict, is in jail and needs someone to bail her out. He hocks pretty much everything he has and raises the money. Everyone believes she is a lost cause, but Aaron is determined to help her get clean and turn her life around. Allen Garfield, Majel Barrett, June Dayton and Margaret Markov guest star.
23	"Conrad and the Taxi Squad"	Jud Taylor	Story by : Lionel E. Siegel; Teleplay by : Lionel E. Siegel & Jack Guss	March 17, 1971
A teenage boy (Kristoffer Tabori) wants Aaron to represent him in breaking away from the custody of his mother and put under the custody of his father. But Aaron finds little reason to believe that the father is interested. Steve Ihnat, Elizabeth Allen and Gwynne Gilford guest star.
24	"I've Got a Problem"	John Newland	Story by : Robert Sabaroff; Teleplay by : Tamara Robbin & Robert Sabaroff	March 24, 1971
The NLO takes the case of a radio show host who is suing his employer for breach of contract after he was fired for expressing his opposition to the Vietnam War on the air, and stating that he would refuse to go if drafted. But he sees it as more than an issue of breach of contract. Gary Lockwood, Fredd Wayne, Warner Anderson and Fred Sadoff guest star.

== Home media ==
On December 9, 2016, CBS DVD and Paramount Home Entertainment released the Complete Series on DVD in region 1. This is a Manufacture-on-Demand (MOD) release, available from online sellers such as Amazon.com and their CreateSpace MOD program.

== Award nominations ==
Year	Award	Result	Category	Recipient
1971	Golden Globe Award	Nominated	Best TV Show - Drama	-
1971	Golden Globe Award	Nominated	Best Supporting Actor - Television	Zalman King
1971	American Cinema Editors	Nominated	Best Edited Television Program	Joseph Dervin (For episode "The Glass Prison")
