= Francine Carroll =

American screenwriter

- Born: Francine Epstein; May 19, 1924; New York City, U.S.
- Died: November 9, 2007 (aged 83); Tarzana, California, U.S.
- Education: University of Arizona
- Occupation: Screenwriter
- Years active: 1970 - 1999
- Spouse: Cy Chermak (m. 1955)
- Children: 3, including Malka Drucker

Francine Epstein (May 19, 1924 – November 9, 2007) was an American screenwriter. She was the creator of the short-lived American police drama television series Amy Prentiss and the wife of producer Cy Chermak.

== Career ==
In 1974, Carroll left writing on Ironside and created the NBC police drama television series Amy Prentiss, which starred Jessica Walter as "Amy Prentiss".

In 1998, Carroll was a screenwriter for the television film Rescuers: Stories of Courage: Two Families along with her husband Cy Chermak, Paul Monash and Malka Drucker. She was nominated for an Writers Guild of America Award for the 60 Minute Category and a Humanitas Prize nomination for Episodic Drama.

== Death ==
Carroll died in November 2007 of natural causes at the Encino-Tarzana Regional Medical Center in Tarzana, California, at the age of 83.
