= Don Mitchell (actor) =

American actor (1943–2013)

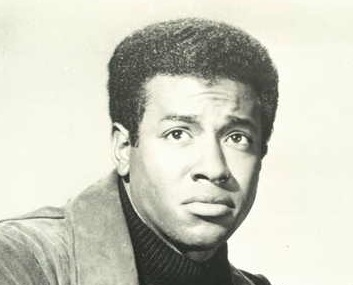
- Mitchell in 1968
- Born: Don Michael Mitchell; March 17, 1943; Houston, Texas, U.S.
- Died: December 8, 2013 (aged 70); Encino, Los Angeles, California, U.S.
- Education: UCLA
- Occupation: Actor
- Years active: 1965–1993
- Spouses: Emilie Blake (m. 1969; div. 1970); Judy Pace (m. 1972; div. 1984)
- Children: 3, including Julia Pace Mitchell

Don Michael Mitchell (March 17, 1943 – December 8, 2013) was an American actor, best known for appearing with Raymond Burr in the NBC television series Ironside (1967–1975). Mitchell played the role of Mark Sanger, and reprised the role in the made-for-TV "reunion" film in 1993, which was noted as his last television appearance.

== Early life and career ==
Don Michael Mitchell was born on March 17, 1943, in Houston, Texas. He was the son of Wilson Mitchell and his wife, Rose Marie (née-Brazos; 1918–2001). He grew up on his grandfather's farm. He "excelled in both football and basketball" at his high school in Houston. His postsecondary education began at Los Angeles City College, from which he transferred to the University of California, Los Angeles, where he studied acting. His acting at UCLA led to his role in Ironside, as producer Collier Young saw Mitchell on stage in a production of Poor Bitos and signed him for the show 3 weeks before production began. Mitchell's other television roles include McMillan & Wife and playing Ed Lawrence on the CBS daytime soap opera Capitol. He also appeared as a policeman in Bewitched and Dr. Samson on Wonder Woman. He also co-starred in the film Scream Blacula Scream (1973).

== Personal life and death ==
From 1969 to 1970, Mitchell was married to the model Emilie Blake, with whom he had a daughter, Dawn Mitchell. In 1972, Mitchell married actress Judy Pace, later divorcing in 1984. Together, Mitchell and Pace had two daughters, actress Julia Pace Mitchell, who appeared on the CBS daytime soap opera The Young and the Restless, and attorney Shawn Meshelle Mitchell. Mitchell died of natural causes at his home in Encino, Los Angeles on December 8, 2013, at age 70.
