= Amy Prentiss =

- Genre: Police drama
- Created by: Francine Carroll
- Starring: Jessica Walter; Johnny Seven; Helen Hunt
- Country of origin: United States
- Original language: English
- No. of seasons: 1
- No. of episodes: 3

Original release
- Network: NBC
- Release: December 1, 1974 – February 2, 1975

Related
- Ironside; Sarge; The Bold Ones: The New Doctors; Ironside (2013)

Amy Prentiss is an American police drama television series that originally aired on NBC.

== Description ==
Amy Prentiss was launched with a two-hour backdoor pilot episode of Ironside, and like that series was set in San Francisco. NBC executives initially rejected the program as a series, but high ratings for the pilot changed their minds.

The show aired as part of the NBC Mystery Movie in 1974–1975, replacing Hec Ramsey, but was canceled after three 2-hour episodes.

Jessica Walter stars as Amy Prentiss, a relatively young investigator who becomes the first female Chief of Detectives for the San Francisco Police Department following the previous chief's death. She is a single mother whose husband died in a plane crash. Prentiss faced opposition from other police officers and from officers' wives.

Helen Hunt, in an early recurring role, plays Prentiss' pre-teen daughter, Jill. Other actors and the characters they portrayed are Steve Sandor as Tony Russell, Arthur Metrano as Rod Pena, Johnny Seven as detective Contreras, and Gwenn Mitchell as Joan Carter.

Guest stars in the series' brief run included William Shatner, Cameron Mitchell, Ron Thompson, Don Murray, Joyce Van Patten and Jamie Farr.

== Recognition ==
In 1975, Walter won the Emmy Award for Outstanding Lead Actress in a Limited Series for her work in Amy Prentiss.

== Episodes ==
The pilot for this series was the two-part Ironside episode "Amy Prentiss," a.k.a. "The Chief" (May 23, 1974).

No.	Title	Directed by	Written by	Original release date
1	"Baptism of Fire"	Jeffrey Hayden	Michael Butler, Christopher Trumbo	December 1, 1974
Amy assumes her duties as San Francisco's first female police chief. Her first assignment: an old friend is suspected of murder, and a mad bomber is striking the city.
2	"The Desperate World of Jane Doe"	Andrew V. McLaglen	Elinor Karpf, Steven Karpf	December 22, 1974
A party host passes out to find a strange, very dead woman in his apartment and himself as the prime suspect. Amy also takes on some phony checks and a cat burglar.
3	"Profile in Evil"	Unknown	Unknown	February 2, 1975
Amy's quarry is a renegade cop who killed a drug dealer and the fellow officer who witnessed his crime.

== See also ==
- List of The NBC Mystery Movie episodes
