= Ironside (1967 TV series) =

American television crime drama (1967–1975)

- Genre: Detective fiction
- Created by: Collier Young
- Starring: Raymond Burr; Don Galloway; Barbara Anderson; Don Mitchell; Elizabeth Baur
- Theme music composer: Quincy Jones
- Country of origin: United States
- Original language: English
- No. of seasons: 8
- No. of episodes: 199 (list of episodes)

Production
- Production companies: Harbour Productions Unlimited; Universal Television

Original release
- Network: NBC
- Release: September 14, 1967 – January 16, 1975

Related
- Sarge; The Bold Ones: The New Doctors; Amy Prentiss; Ironside (2013)

Ironside is an American television crime drama that aired on NBC over eight seasons from 1967 to 1975. The show starred Raymond Burr as Robert T. Ironside (usually addressed by the title "Chief Ironside"), a consultant to the San Francisco police department (formerly chief of detectives), who was paralyzed from the waist down after being shot while on vacation. The character debuted on March 28, 1967, in a TV movie titled Ironside. When the series was broadcast in the United Kingdom, from late 1967 onward, it was broadcast as A Man Called Ironside. The show earned Burr six Emmy and two Golden Globe nominations.

Ironside was a production of Burr's Harbour Productions Unlimited in association with Universal Television.

== Plot ==
The series revolves around former San Francisco Police Department (SFPD) Chief of Detectives Robert T. Ironside (Raymond Burr), a Navy veteran, widower, and veteran of 25 years of police service. He was forced to retire from the department after a sniper's bullet to the spine paralyzed him from the waist down, resulting in his reliance on a wheelchair. In the pilot episode, a television movie, Ironside shows his strength of character and gets himself appointed a peculiar and unprecedented job; a "special department consultant", by his good friend, Police Commissioner Dennis Randall. He does this by calling a press conference and then tricking Commissioner Randall into meeting his terms. In the pilot, Ironside eventually solves the mystery of the ambush. He requests Ed Brown and Eve Whitfield be assigned to him as his own private law enforcement squad.

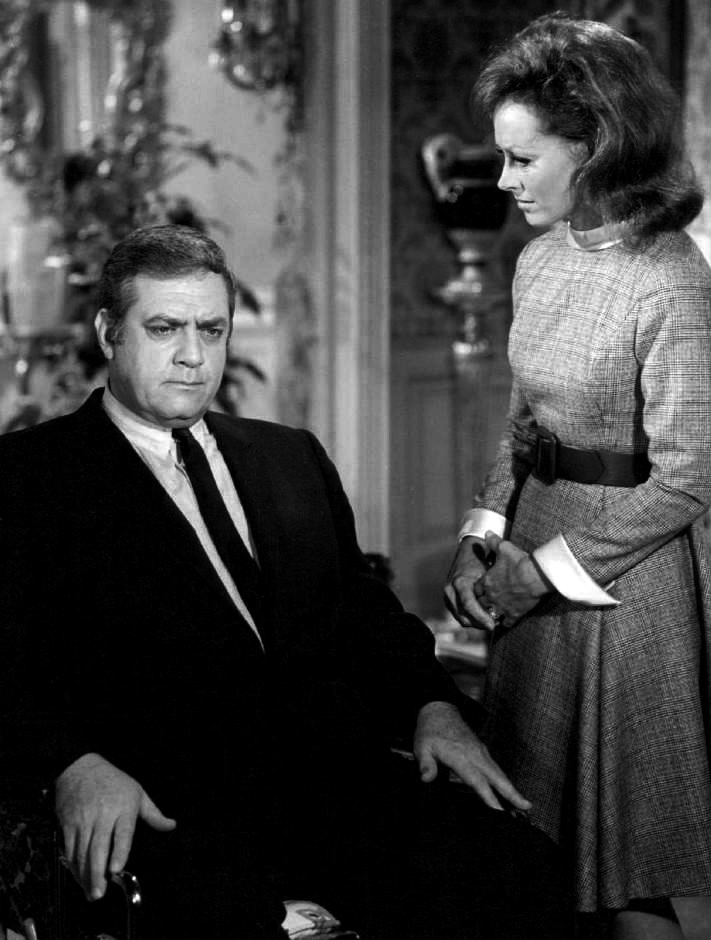
Raymond Burr as Ironside

Supporting characters on Ironside include Det. Sgt. Edward "Ed" Brown (Don Galloway) and a young socialite-turned-plainclothes officer, Eve Whitfield (Barbara Anderson). In addition, delinquent-turned assistant Mark Sanger (Don Mitchell), who subsequently attends and graduates from law school (night classes were mentioned from early on), joins the San Francisco police force himself in the sixth season, then marries late in the run of the series. Commissioner Randall is played by Gene Lyons.

After the program's fourth season, Anderson left for personal reasons, and her character was then replaced by another young policewoman, Fran Belding (Elizabeth Baur), the daughter of a fallen cop, who filled much the same role for four more years.

Ironside uses a fourth-floor room (for living and office space) in the old San Francisco Hall of Justice building, which housed the city's police headquarters. He recruits Mark Sanger to be his personal assistant after Sanger is brought in as a suspect who wanted to kill Ironside. Ironside acquires a specially equipped, former fleet-modified 1940 1 1/2-ton Ford police patrol wagon, with bulletproof glass and a specially modified high-performance supercharged and fuel-injected V-8 engine. This is replaced in the episode titled "Poole's Paradise" after the van is destroyed by Sergeant Brown as part of a plan to trick a corrupt sheriff. At the end of the episode, the patrol wagon is replaced by a one-off fully custom modified 1969 one-ton Ford Econoline Window Van.

The show became a success as Ironside depended on brains and initiative in solving cases. Although Ironside is portrayed as good-hearted and honest, he maintains a gruff persona. The series enjoyed a seven-and-a-half-season run on NBC, drawing respectable, if not always high ratings. As the shortened eighth and final season began (only 16 of 19 episodes produced were aired by NBC), Universal released a syndicated rerun package of episodes from earlier seasons under the title The Raymond Burr Show, reflecting the practice of that time to differentiate original network episodes from syndicated reruns whenever possible. After NBC's midseason cancellation, however, the syndicated episodes reverted to the Ironside title.

== Cast ==
- Raymond Burr as Chief Robert T. Ironside
- Don Galloway as Detective Sergeant Ed Brown
- Barbara Anderson as Officer Eve Whitfield
- Don Mitchell as (later Officer) Mark Sanger
- Elizabeth Baur as Officer Fran Belding
- Gene Lyons as Commissioner Dennis Randall (recurring role)

== Production ==
=== Locations ===
The show was filmed in a mixture of locations, sometimes in San Francisco, but also with a large number of studio scenes (including scenes with conversations in a moving vehicle, where a traffic backdrop is used). The shows contained stock footage of San Francisco, with pan shots of Coit Tower or clips of traffic scenes.

Ironside and his team used a rather large open space on the fourth floor of the Old Hall of Justice in San Francisco at 750 Kearny Street between Washington and Merchant Streets. The Old Hall had already been demolished while Ironside was still in production. It had been abandoned in 1961 and demolished in late 1967. The SFPD had begun using their new home by January 1962. In December 1967, demolition finally began. Wrecking balls and bulldozers took five months to raze the building.

=== Music ===
The opening theme music was composed by Quincy Jones, and was the first synthesizer-based television theme song. In 1971, Jones recorded a fuller four-minute band version for the album Smackwater Jack. This recording was then edited and used for the opening credits of the fifth through eighth seasons (1971–1975). (The entire album track can be heard in the fifth-season episode "Unreasonable Facsimile" as Ironside and team track a suspect on the streets of San Francisco.) The iconic theme music has since been sampled in numerous recordings and soundtracks to television commercials and shows, including Kill Bill: Volume 1. The score for the episode "The Macabre Mr. Micawber" by Billy Goldenberg (credited as William Goldenberg) was sampled for the song "All Caps" by the hip-hop duo Madvillain.

In addition to the opening theme music, Quincy Jones composed the entire score for the first eight episodes. Oliver Nelson took over those duties up to the end of the winter to spring 1972 episodes. Nelson was then replaced by Marty Paich for nearly all of the episodes from the beginning of the fall of that year until the last episode that was produced, in late 1974. The song "Even When You Cry", with music composed by Jones and lyrics written by Alan and Marilyn Bergman, was performed by James Farentino in the episode "Something for Nothing", while Marcia Strassman had already sung it off-screen in the earlier episode "The Man Who Believed"; both installments were originally broadcast during season one.

=== Personnel ===
- Freddie Hubbard − trumpet
- Frank Rosolino − trombone
- Hubert Laws − flute
- Anthony Ortega, Jerome Richardson, Dan Higgins − reeds
- Howard Roberts, Bill Pitman − guitar
- Carol Kaye − electric bass
- Shelly Manne, Earl Palmer − drums

== Episodes ==
=== Episode list ===
| Season | Episodes | Originally aired | |
| Season | Episodes | First aired | Last aired |
|---|---|---|---|
| Pilot * | 1 | March 28, 1967 | |
| 1 | 28 | September 14, 1967 | April 4, 1968 |
| 2 | 26 | September 19, 1968 | April 10, 1969 |
| 3 | 26 | September 18, 1969 | April 9, 1970 |
| 4 | 26 | September 17, 1970 | April 15, 1971 |
| 5 | 25 | September 21, 1971 | March 9, 1972 |
| 6 | 24 | September 14, 1972 | March 22, 1973 |
| 7 | 25 | September 13, 1973 | May 23, 1974 |
| 8 | 19 ** | September 12, 1974 | January 16, 1975 |
| TV movie | 1 | May 4, 1993 | |

* The pilot episode was titled A Man Called Ironside.
** The last three episodes of the series were not broadcast on NBC, but were later seen in syndication, as well as released on DVD.

=== TV reunion movie ===
Burr and the main cast reunited for a made-for-TV movie in 1993, The Return of Ironside, which aired on May 4, 1993, on NBC, not long before Burr's death. At the time, Burr was starring in a series of telefilms for NBC playing his most famous character, Perry Mason. In the years between the end of Ironside in 1975 and the first Perry Mason movie in 1985, Burr's appearance had undergone some changes. His hair was grayer, he had gained a significant amount of weight, and after years of playing clean-shaven characters, he grew a beard.

Since nearly 20 years had passed since Ironside left the air, and as he had been playing Perry Mason on television for the previous eight years, Burr felt that he was more associated with Perry Mason. He believed that to play Ironside properly and not confuse viewers, he would need to undergo a small makeover to distinguish the Ironside character from the more identifiable Perry Mason. Burr thus had his hair colored (which was unnecessary, since Burr was already gray-haired when Ironside originally aired) and cut his beard down to a goatee. One thing Burr did not need to do, however, was pretend to be disabled. At the time the Ironside reunion went into production, Burr had been suffering from kidney cancer that had metastasized to his liver, and the disease left him unable to stand or walk without assistance. Thus, like Ironside, Burr used a wheelchair to get around.

Unlike the original series, which took place in San Francisco, the reunion was set and filmed in Denver, Colorado, with the justification that the character Ed Brown had become the city's deputy chief of police. (Denver was also where most of Burr's Perry Mason TV movies were produced.) Galloway, Mitchell, Anderson, and Baur recreated their roles for the movie, though Anderson and Baur had not worked at the same time on the original series.

== Broadcast history ==
| Season | Time slot |
|---|---|
| 1 (1967–1968) | Thursday at 8:30-9:30 pm (EST) |
| 2 (1968–1969) | Thursday at 8:30-9:30 pm (EST) |
| 3 (1969–1970) | Thursday at 8:30-9:30 pm (EST) |
| 4 (1970–1971) | Thursday at 8:30-9:30 pm (EST) |
| 5 (1971–1972) | Tuesday at 7:30-8:30 pm (EST) (September 21 – November 23, 1971); Thursday at 9:00–10:00 pm (EST) (November 25, 1971 – March 9, 1972) |
| 6 (1972–1973) | Thursday at 9:00–10:00 pm (EST) |
| 7 (1973–1974) | Thursday at 9:00–10:00 pm (EST) |
| 8 (1974–1975) | Thursday at 9:00–10:00 pm (EST) |

== Notable guest appearances ==
| Name | Episode(s) |
|---|---|
| Geraldine Brooks | "Ironside" (pilot, 1967) |
| Tiny Tim | "Ironside" (Pilot, 1967) |
| Wally Cox | "Ironside" (Pilot, 1967) |
| Joel Fabiani | "Ironside" (Pilot, 1967) |
| Susan Saint James | "Girl in the Night" (1967); "Something for Nothing" (1968) |
| E. G. Marshall | "Five Days in the Death of Sgt. Brown: Part I" (1972) |
| Harrison Ford | "The Past Is Prologue" (1967) |
| Desi Arnaz | "Riddle at 24000" (1974) |
| Paul Winfield | "Robert Phillips vs. the Man" (1968); "Find a Victim" (1972) |
| Alan Hewitt | "The Laying on of Hands" (1970) |
| Paul Fix | "The Laying on of Hands" (1970) |
| Harold Gould | "The Armageddon Gang" (1973) |
| Gerald S. O'Loughlin | "Not with a Whimper, But a Bang" (1969); "The Man on the Inside" (1970) |
| Jackie Cooper | "The Countdown" (1972) |
| Jack Soo | "Amy Prentiss"(1) "Amy Prentiss" (2) "The Over-the-Hill Blues" (1974) |
| Michael Bell | "Little Jerry Jessup" (1970); "The Man on the Inside" (1970); "Murder Impromptu" (1971); "Shadow Soldiers" (1972); "Two Hundred Large" (1974); "Run Scared" (1974) |
| James Farentino | "Something for Nothing" (1968) |
| Robert Reed | "Light at the End of the Journey" (1967) |
| Carl Betz | "The Lonely Way to Go" (1970) |
| Bill Bixby | "Sergeant Mike" (1968); "Tom Dayton Is Loose Among Us" (1970); "Raise the Devil: Part 1" (1974); "Raise the Devil: Part 2" (1974) |
| Jack Kelly | "Tagged for Murder" (1967), "Cold Hard Cash" (1972) |
| David Cassidy | "Stolen on Demand" (1969) |
| David Carradine | "Due Process of Law" (1968); "The Quincunx" (1971); "License to Kill" (1971) |
| Rod Serling | "Bubble, Bubble, Toil and Murder" (1972) |
| Alan Napier | "Return to Fiji" (1970); "All About Andrea" (1973); "The Lost Cotillon" (1974) |
| James Shigeta | "No Motive for Murder" (1971) |
| Richard Basehart | "Noel's Gonna Fly" (1970) |
| Martin Sheen | "No Game for Amateurs" (1970) |
| Dana Wynter | "Beyond a Shadow" (1969); "In the Forests of the Night" (1973) |
| Mort Sahl | "Beyond a Shadow" (1969) |
| Anne Baxter | "An Obvious Case of Guilt" (1968); "Programmed for Danger" (1969) |
| Ed Asner | "The Fourteenth Runner" (1967); "Not with a Whimper, But a Bang" (1969) |
| Forrest Tucker | "Too Many Victims" (1970) |
| Eddie Garrett | "Side Pocket" (1968); "The Machismo Bag" (1969) |
| Darwin Joston | "Warrior's Return" (1970); "The Target" (1971); "Cross Doublecross" (1974) |
| John Rubinstein | "The Leaf in the Forest" (1967) |
| James Gregory | "Message from Beyond" (1967), "Rundown on a Bum Rap" (1969); "Programmed for Panic" (1972); "The Hidden Man" (1973) |
| Jack Lord | "Dead Man's Tale" (1967) |
| Scott Marlowe | "The Deadly Gamesmen" (1972) |
| Norman Fell | "An Inside Job" (1967); "Seeing Is Believing" (1969) |
| James Drury | "The Professionals" (1971) |
| Fritz Weaver | "Ransom" (1970) |
| John Saxon | "An Inside Job" (1967); "Ransom" (1970) |
| Khigh Dhiegh | "Love My Enemy" (1969) |
| Pernell Roberts | "To Kill a Cop" (1968); "The Organizer" (1975) |
| Val Avery | "Achilles' Heel" (1972); "Love Me in December" (1973) |
| George Takei | "No Motive for Murder" (1971) |
| Jodie Foster | "Bubble, Bubble, Toil and Murder" (1972) |
| Eve McVeagh | "An Obvious Case of Guilt" (1968) |
| Ricardo Montalbán | "The Sacrifice" (1968) |
| Gavin MacLeod | "Return of the Hero" (1968) |
| Burgess Meredith | "The Macabre Mr. Micawber" (1968); "Unreasonable Facsimile" (1972) |
| Bruce Lee | "Tagged for Murder" (1967) |
| Robert Alda | "The Taker" (1967); "The Sacrifice" (1968); "A Bullet for Mark" (1969) |
| Leo G. Carroll | "Little Dog, Gone" (1970) |
| David Opatoshu | "L'Chayim" (1969) |
| William Shatner | "Little Jerry Jessup" (1970); "Walls Are Waiting" (1971); "Amy Prentiss: Part 1" (1974); "Amy Prentiss: Part 2" (1974) |
| DeForest Kelley | "Warrior's Return" (1970) |
| Dana Elcar | "Eye of the Hurricane" (1969); "A Killing at the Track" (1971); "Joss Sticks and Wedding Bells" (1971); "The Savage Sentry" (1972) |
| Vito Scotti | "The Machismo Bag" (1969) |
| Robert Lansing | "The Lonely Hostage" (1968) |
| Ellen Corby | "Why the Tuesday Afternoon Bridge Club Met on Thursday" (1969) |
| Ron Thompson | "Amy Prentiss: Part 1" (1974) |
| Walter Burke | "All in a Day's Work" (1968) |
| Pete Duel | "Perfect Crime" (1968) |
| Barbara Hale | "Murder Impromptu" (1971) |
| Walter Koenig | "The Summer Soldier" (1971) |
| Dorothy Malone | "Confessions: From a Lady of the Night" (1973) |
| Frank Gorshin | "What's New With Mark?" (1974) |
| Cameron Mitchell | "What's New With Mark?" (1974) |
| John Carradine | "Gentle Oaks" (1971) |
| Kiel Martin | "Barbara Who" (1968) |

== Crossovers and spin-offs ==
At the start of its sixth season, Ironside did a two-part crossover episode with The Bold Ones: The New Doctors, titled "Five Days in the Death of Sergeant Brown", where Ed is critically injured by a sniper and is treated by Dr. David Craig and his medical staff. Part 1 was broadcast on Ironside and part two on The New Doctors. Part two is now shown in reruns as an episode of Ironside. E. G. Marshall and David Hartman (stars of The New Doctors) received starring credit in the opening credits of both episodes. Part two features a longer edited version of Quincy Jones' "Ironside" theme as heard on his 1971 album Smackwater Jack.

NBC's 1971 fall TV season opened with a two-hour crossover between Ironside and a new series, Sarge, starring George Kennedy as a cop-turned-priest. Kennedy's San Diego–based Father Samuel Cavanaugh comes to San Francisco because of the death of a friend and fellow priest, and his investigation gets him embroiled with Ironside and his staff. The special consolidated the two shows' consecutive time slots and has been subsequently seen as a TV-movie, The Priest Killer.

Jessica Walter guest-starred in a spin-off episode for the series Amy Prentiss, which aired as part of The NBC Mystery Movie during the 1974–1975 season. She played a relatively young investigator who becomes chief of detectives for the San Francisco Police Department. Helen Hunt, in an early role, played Prentiss' preteen daughter, Jill. Three two-hour episodes were aired.

The 22nd episode of season seven, airing in March 1974, and titled "Riddle at 24,000", was a pilot for "Dr. Domingo", a proposed spin-off series starring Desi Arnaz as a crime-solving physician in a small, California town. It was written by Lane Slate, perhaps best known as the screenwriter of They Only Kill Their Masters, the James Garner movie about a small-town police chief.

== 2013 remake ==
In 2013, a short-lived remake with the same name aired on NBC. Actor Blair Underwood took on the title role (with none of the other characters from the original series being used), while the action was relocated from San Francisco to New York City. This version of the character was more in the tough cop mold, often at odds with his superiors over his unrelenting, even violent approach to police work. The series was lambasted by critics and ignored by viewers, and was cancelled and pulled after the airing of just four episodes (of nine produced).

== Other media ==
There was a single novel based on the series by Jim Thompson. It was published in 1967 by Popular Library.

There was also a board game published by Ideal in 1967.

== Parodies ==
An episode of Get Smart that aired in March 1969 was titled "Leadside" and featured a wheelchair-using master criminal by that name (and his assistants). Leadside could not walk, but he was able to run. Leadside was directed by Gary Nelson. Nelson never directed on Ironside during its original stint as a television series but instead directed the reunion television movie The Return of Ironside.

Another Get Smart episode, called "Ironhand", had a KAOS operative with a hand encased in metal hence why he was known as Ironhand.

The December 1970 issue of Mad magazine included a parody of Ironside titled "Ironride".

On The Benny Hill Show, Benny Hill played Ironside in a few sketches, most notably in a sketch called "Murder on the Oregon Express", which parodied several television detective characters.

Impressionist Billy Howard included Ironside as one of the detectives parodied in his novelty hit record King of the Cops.

The 1980 television movie Murder Can Hurt You spoofs numerous television detectives from the 1970s and '80s, and includes Victor Buono playing the wheelchair-using detective Ironbottom.

American Dad has an episode, "Wheels and Legman", that loosely parodies Ironside and similar programs in which Roger and Steve have a fictional detective agency.

In the "Gone Efficient" episode of Harvey Birdman, Attorney at Law, a man in a wheelchair is shown pleading a case in front of Judge Mentok (who strongly resembles Raymond Burr) as a nod to both Ironside and Perry Mason.

A promo for the adult animated sitcom Archer was made in the style of the show's opening sequence, replacing Ironside with the character Ray Gillette, who had been temporarily using a wheelchair after a spinal injury.

== Home media ==
Shout! Factory has released the first four seasons of Ironside on DVD in Region 1. Seasons three and four were released as Shout Factory Exclusives, available exclusively through Shout!'s online store.

On May 9, 2017, Shout! Factory re-released season three as a general retail release. Season four was re-released on August 22, 2017.

In Region 2, Anchor Bay Entertainment released the first season on DVD in the UK on August 25, 2008.

In Region 4, Madman Entertainment released all eight seasons on DVD. The eighth and final season, which included the 1993 TV reunion movie The Return of Ironside, was released on October 19, 2011.

Season five includes the two-part crossover TV movie episode The Priest Killer, a crossover with the series Sarge.

| DVD name | Ep# | Release dates | |
| DVD name | Ep# | Region 1 | Region 4 |
|---|---|---|---|
| Season 1 | 29 (includes pilot movie) | April 24, 2007 | August 16, 2007 |
| Season 2 | 26 | October 16, 2007 | November 8, 2007 |
| Season 3 | 26 | January 19, 2010♦ May 9, 2017 (re-release) | September 16, 2008 |
| Season 4 | 26 | October 19, 2010♦ August 22, 2017 (re-release) | June 24, 2009 |
| Season 5 | 25 | N/A | May 19, 2010 |
| Season 6 | 24 | N/A | August 11, 2010 |
| Season 7 | 25 | N/A | February 2, 2011 |
| Season 8 | 19 | N/A | October 19, 2011 |

♦ – Shout! Factory Exclusives title, sold exclusively through Shout's online store

== See also ==
- Jessie McTavish, British woman who was alleged to have murdered a woman after being inspired by the plot of Ironside
