= The Fugitive season 3 =

The Fugitive
- Season 3
- No. of episodes: 30

Release
- Original network: ABC
- Original release: September 14, 1965 – April 26, 1966

Season chronology
- ← Previous; Season 2 Next → Season 4

The third season of The Fugitive originally aired Tuesdays at 10:00-11:00 pm on ABC from September 14, 1965 to April 26, 1966. The season was released through two volumes on Region 1 DVDs, with the first volume (containing the first 15 episodes) being released on October 27, 2009 and Volume 2 being released on December 8, 2009.

== Episodes ==
No. overall	No. in season	Title	Directed by	Written by	Kimble's Alias and Location	Original release date	Prod. code
61	1	"Wings of an Angel"	William A. Graham	S : Otto King; S/T : Don Brinkley	George Egan Oklahoma	September 14, 1965	4701
Kimble is riding on a bus when the police stop it to capture an escaped convict, who takes a woman hostage. Kimble disarms the man, but gets stabbed during the struggle while the convict is shot dead. Not knowing his true identity, the police treat Kimble as a hero and transport him to a prison hospital for treatment. When two inmates recognize Kimble, they threaten to reveal his identity unless he assists them in their drug-smuggling scheme. Guest Stars: Lin McCarthy as Warden Maddox, Greg Morris as Mickey Deming, Harold Gould as Dr. Willis, and Sue Randall as Nurse Thompson.
62	2	"Middle of a Heat Wave"	Alexander Singer	Robert Hamner	Jim Owen Lake City, New York	September 21, 1965	4709
Kimble breaks up with a local woman he has been dating, Laurel Harper, and she angrily storms out of the bar they are in and into the night. The next morning, Laurel is found on an abandoned road unconscious and badly beaten. While she is taken to a hospital for treatment, Laurel's paranoid and suspicious sister, Sheila, convinces the police to hold Kimble for questioning. Guest Stars: J.D. Cannon as Sheriff Todd Collison, Carol Rossen as Laurel Harper, John Lasell as Frank, Paul Comi as the First Deputy, Sarah Marshall as Sheila Pettie, James Doohan as the Doctor, and Mimi Dillard as the Waitress.
63	3	"Crack in a Crystal Ball"	Walter Grauman	Richard Levinson & William Link	Joe Warren St. Anne & Spring City, Minnesota	September 28, 1965	4705
Sal Mitchell is a scam artist posing as a psychic who goes on TV to prove that he knows where Kimble will appear next after he recognizes Kimble working at a gas station. The con artist's girlfriend, Joan, then contacts Kimble by pretending to know the whereabouts of the one-armed man hoping Kimble will go to a place they say he is so the police can arrest him. Guest Stars: Larry Blyden as Sal Mitchell, J. Pat O'Malley as Mr. McBride, and Joanna Moore as Joan Mitchell.
64	4	"Trial by Fire"	Alexander Singer	Philip Saltzman	N/A Chicago, Illinois	October 5, 1965	4706
Richard Kimble telephones his sister, Donna, and she reveals that she had received a letter from James Eckhardt, a former U.S. Army captain who also saw the one-armed man fleeing from the Kimble house on the night of Helen's murder. Concerned about cranks, Donna had a private detective verify that James Eckhardt is legitimate, and Richard Kimble meets with him in Chicago. James Eckhardt had been reluctant to testify for Richard Kimble but upon meeting him—and seeing the man genuinely needs his help-agrees to testify. Richard Kimble's lawyer, Burton Green, who defended him during the trial, meets with James Eckhardt and is positive that his testimonial is legitimate. He advises Richard Kimble to turn himself in so that the lawyer can begin work on an appeal. Richard Kimble refuses, as he is determined to find the one armed man first. Unbeknownst to them, a convict in prison for drug dealing comes forward as a witness and reveals to Gerard that he used to sell morphine to James Eckhardt and that Captain Eckhardt was on his way to see him that night to buy some drugs, which is enough for Gerard to discredit the captain's testimony. When Donna and her lawyer learn of this development, Donna must rush to contact James Eckhardt in order to stop Richard Kimble from turning himself in. Guest Stars: Marion Ross as Marion Eckhardt, Charles Aidman as Capt. James Eckhardt, Frank Aletter as Burton Green, Tommy Rettig as J.J. Eickhardt, Chris Alcaide as Lieutenant Horvath, and Jacqueline Scott as Donna Taft. • Barry Morse appears in this episode.
65	5	"Conspiracy of Silence"	Jerry Hopper	William D. Gordon	Fred Tate 62 miles from Reeseburg, Arizona	October 12, 1965	4704
While working as a steward at a remote desert resort, Kimble is unaware that the area is a top-secret government test site for chemical weapons. When Kimble tries to leave, he is mistaken for a spy by Major Beck, and subsequently detained. When several staff members, including the staff physician, are injured by the resulting chemical explosion, Kimble is forced to care for the wounded. All the while, Kimble is unaware that Beck still plans to turn him in to the army general spearheading the project. Guest Stars: Donald Harron as Major Christopher Beck, Malachi Throne as David Jones, and Byron Morrow as General Fredericks.
66	6	"Three Cheers for Little Boy Blue"	Walter Grauman	T : Harry Kronman; S/T : Chester Krumholz	Tom Nash Ardmore, Iowa	October 19, 1965	4703
Kimble is working as a chauffeur for George Forster, a successful contractor who returns to his small Midwestern home town with big plans for the community. Kimble discovers that one of the townspeople is planning to kill Forster—and he must determine who it is. Guest Stars: Richard Anderson as George Forster, Ed Asner as Roy Malinek, Fay Spain as Mona Keel, Milton Selzer as Ben Willoughby, Vaughn Taylor as Arvin Keel, and DeForest Kelley as Charlie.
67	7	"All the Scared Rabbits"	Robert Butler	T : Norman Lessing; S/T : William Bast	Joe Taft Iowa/Dalhart, Texas/Dos Palos, New Mexico	October 26, 1965	4713
Kimble responds to a newspaper ad for a driver and is hired to drive Peggy Franklin and her 10-year-old daughter, Nancy, to California. What Kimble does not realize is that Peggy has abducted Nancy from her ex-husband, a pathologist named Dean Franklin. Before leaving, Nancy innocently kidnaps a rabbit from Dean's research lab, unaware that the rabbit has meningitis. When Nancy contracts the sickness, Kimble risks keeping his secret safe in order to save the little girl. Guest Stars: Suzanne Pleshette as Peggy Franklin, Liam Sullivan as Dean Franklin, and R.G. Armstrong as Marshal Matt Peters.
68	8	"An Apple a Day"	Ralph Senensky	Daniel B. Ullman	Ed Curtis Briar County, Colorado	November 2, 1965	4710
Running from the police, Kimble hides out at a farm owned by a local country doctor, Josephus Adams, who treats his patients with honey and a reassuring word. After one elderly woman under Adams’s care dies from a protracted bronchial infection, an angry Kimble intervenes and tries to help the patients. In the meantime, Adams’s wife, Marianne, discovers Kimble's identity and attempts to use it to her own advantage. When Adams’s teenage niece Sharon falls into a coma after having an allergic reaction to a bee stings, Kimble risks his freedom to take her to a hospital for formal treatment. Guest Stars: Arthur O'Connell as Josephus Adams, Kim Darby as Sharon Wolfe, and Sheree North as Marianne Adams.
69 70	9 10	"Landscape with Running Figures"	Walter Grauman	Anthony Wilson	Steve Carver Wichita, Fredonia & Tilden, Kansas	November 16, 1965 November 23, 1965	4707 4708
An exhausted Kimble, more weary and disconsolate than ever before, commits a terrible mistake: he signs in to work using his real name (rather than his alias) on a timesheet. In response, Lt. Gerard cuts short a vacation with his wife Marie to follow the lead. Marie can no longer conceal her disdain regarding Gerard's obsession with Kimble, which has hindered their marriage. As Gerard monitors the dragnet from police headquarters, Marie makes the decision to leave her husband. In doing so, she ends up on the same bus with a demoralized Kimble, as only a few buses are running due to many roads under water from flooding. The bus crashes, and Marie sustains a head injury, resulting in temporary blindness. Kimble and Marie, each traveling under an alias, are unaware of each other's true identities, and drive off together in search of medical help. Kimble and Marie Gerard, who is still blind and helpless, arrive in Tilden, a town that has been evacuated due to flood warnings. While waiting for help in the abandoned town, Kimble and Marie are menaced by a trio of sadistic teenagers. After the teens leave, Marie realizes who Kimble really is after he mentions the motto for the local paper in Stafford, Indiana. Through a telephone switchboard, she is able to contact her husband and ask for help. With her husband on the way, she attempts to delay Kimble’s departure, hoping that his capture will end her husband’s obsession and save her marriage. Kimble ultimately discovers the truth, and once again evades Gerard. Guest Stars: Herschel Bernardi as Captain Ames and Barbara Rush as Marie Gerard. • Barry Morse appears in this two-part episode.
71	11	"Set Fire to a Straw Man"	Don Medford	Jack Turley	Chris Benson Tracton, New Jersey	November 30, 1965	4702
Kimble reluctantly becomes involved with Stella Savano, the sister of George Savano, who runs the trucking company where Kimble works. Stella is an emotionally disturbed woman with a dangerous obsession with Johnny, the adopted eight-year-old son of Jesse Stangel, Kimble's co-worker. Kimble learns that Stella is actually Johnny's mother, but Stella becomes so delusional that she thinks that Kimble is Johnny's father, and that the three are destined to be together as a family—a dangerous proposition for Kimble, who has been warned by his boss to stay away from Stella. Guest Stars: Edward Binns as George Savano, Joseph Campanella as Jesse Stangel, Diana Hyland as Stella Savano, Clint Howard as Johnny Stangel, and Shelley Morrison as Ginny.
72	12	"Stranger in the Mirror"	Joseph Sargent	Don Brinkley	John Evans Sona Falls, Washington	December 7, 1965	4718
Kimble is working as a custodian for the Saturday Morning Camp, a weekend camp run by Tony and Carole Burnell. Things become complicated when two police officers are found beaten to death near the camp. The police recruit Tony, a former policeman, to interrogate a local juvenile delinquent who is the main suspect in the killings. Tony reluctantly begins to suspect Kimble, after a box containing the badges of the murdered policemen shows up in Kimble's apartment. Unknown to everyone—the real killer is Tony—who has been murdering police officers and has no memory of the killings afterwards. Subconsciously, Tony blames the police for the death of his father, a policeman who was sent to prison on a trumped-up murder charge and then killed by dirty cops during a prison riot. Guest Stars: Norman Fell as Lt. Green, William Shatner as Tony Burnell, and Julie Sommars as Carole Burnell.
73	13	"The Good Guys and the Bad Guys"	Alexander Singer	Don Brinkley	Bill Watkins Drover City, Montana	December 14, 1965	4714
In the small town of Drover City, Montana, Kimble stumbles onto the annual vigilante roundup, an event where locals hunt down anybody not wearing Western cowboy clothing. After being lassoed, Kimble is held "prisoner" in the local school cafeteria where the dance hall is. Gerard arrives in the area after hearing reports of Kimble's possible presence, and he has the state police set up roadblocks outside the town entrance while also looking for the fugitive himself. Gerard shows Kimble's mug shot to Charley Judd, the town marshal who recognizes Kimble. Charley, believing a reward is being offered for Kimble, sends Gerard away on a false lead. Charley then coerces his reluctant girlfriend Laura to secretly lock Kimble up at the police station. Guest Stars: Earl Holliman as Charley Judd, Collin Wilcox as Laura McElvey, and Bruce Dern as Hank. • Barry Morse appears in this episode.
74	14	"End of the Line"	William A. Graham	James Menzies	Bob Mossman Raiford & Fort Scott, Florida	December 21, 1965	4717
After losing his wallet, Kimble steals another wallet to pay for his train fare. The wallet belongs to R.T. Unger, who owns a local dairy. Kimble works as a dishwasher at a local diner in order to repay the debt, but when Unger finds his wallet missing, he calls the police. Kimble goes to Unger's house and gives back the wallet and money to Unger's daughter, Betty Jo, who is pregnant by Neil, a disreputable youth who works at Unger's dairy. Unger offers Neil $500 to leave town, but when Neil demands $1,000, their argument turns into a fistfight where Kimble walks in and sees Neil kill Unger. Guest Stars: Crahan Denton as R.T. Unger, James Hong as Edward Hee, Barbara Dana as Betty Jo Unger, and Andrew Prine as Neil Hollis.
75	15	"When the Wind Blows"	Ralph Senensky	Betty Langdon	Jim McGuire Smallgroves, Wyoming	December 28, 1965	4712
In rural Wyoming, Kimble seeks refuge from the local constable at a small motel run by Lois Carter, a young widow who hires him as a handyman. Kimble soon befriends Lois’ savant son Kenny, who protects Kimble from the police when they arrive looking for him. Guest Stars: Georgann Johnson as Lois Carter, Greg Mullavy as Carl Ritter, Harry Townes as Russ Atkinson, and Johnny Jensen as Kenny Carter.
76	16	"Not with a Whimper"	Alexander Singer	Norman Lessing	Richard Spaulding Hempstead Mills, West Virginia	January 4, 1966	4720
Kimble arrives in Hempstead Mills, West Virginia to assist Andrew McCallister, his longtime mentor who is dying from lung cancer. McCallister's vigorous anti-smog campaign has earned him a reputation as a local crackpot, but the old man plans to go out with a bang by having a bomb hidden in a package and delivered to the local factory. When McCallister discovers that a group of school children will be inside the factory during a field trip at the time of the explosion, he dispatches Kimble to evacuate the building and deactivate the bomb before time runs out. Guest Stars: Laurence Naismith as Andrew McCallister, and Lee Meriwether as Willis Hampton.
77	17	"Wife Killer"	Richard Donner	Daniel B. Ullman	N/A Baker City, Michigan	January 11, 1966	4716
Reporter Barbara Webb returns to Baker City, Michigan, where she was a reporter for the local paper and previously engaged to marry the paper's editor Herb Malone. Covering a police roundup during a murder investigation she spots Fred Johnson—the one-armed man—and remembers the Richard Kimble story. She takes a photo of Johnson and publishes it in the local newspaper, and the image of the one-armed man draws both Kimble and Gerard to the town. While Gerard waits for Kimble to show up at the police station, the fugitive is outside and sees Johnson in the jail courtyard, but the one-armed man spots Kimble and escapes from the jail and steals a car. Barbara spots Kimble and tells him to get in her car as they chase after the one-armed man. During the chase down a winding mountain road, the one-armed man's car crashes and Kimble has to tend to his injuries knowing that he's the only one to clear Kimble of his wife's murder. Barbara for her part helps Kimble and recruits Herb Malone to cover for her against Gerard. Guest Stars: Janice Rule as Barbara Webb, and Kevin McCarthy as Herb Malone. • Barry Morse appears in this episode. • Bill Raisch appears in this episode and credited as his character's alias Fred Johnson. This was his first appearance on the show in over a year. He did not appear at all in the calendar year 1965.
78	18	"This'll Kill You"	Alex March	George Eckstein	Nick Phillips Yonkers, New York	January 18, 1966	4722
Kimble finds work at a Laundromat owned by Charlie Paris, a former stand-up comic and mob bookie who hopes to go straight. However, Kimble doesn't know that the underworld has put a hit contract on Charlie for testifying against some of their business "associates." Charlie hopes to make amends with his longtime girlfriend Paula, but she's more interested in Kimble. When hitman Pete Ragin (Philip E. Pine) offers Paula $8,000 for turning Charlie over to them, she does not pass up the chance and takes the money. Meanwhile, Charlie refuses to believe Kimble's suspicions that Paula plans to betray him. Guest Stars: Mickey Rooney as Charlie Paris, and Nita Talbot as Paula Jellison.
79	19	"Echo of a Nightmare"	James Sheldon	S : Robert Lewin; T : John Kneubuhl	Richard Taylor A city and area near Redlands, California	January 25, 1966	4721
Jane Washburn, an undercover policewoman, witnesses three youths beat up and rob Kimble. She tends to him, but becomes suspicious after he declines to report his mugging to the police. Jane handcuffs herself to Kimble to arrest him, but he manages to flee the area with her. After Jane sprains her ankle after hopping off a freight train, they break into an abandoned farm house so Kimble can tend to her as well as saw off the handcuffs. Soon, the family that lives there returns and Kimble is held at gunpoint by the sadistic patriarch of the family. Guest Star: Shirley Knight as Jane Washburn.
80	20	"Stroke of Genius"	Robert Butler	John Kneubuhl	Frank Whistler Santa Elena, New Mexico	February 1, 1966	4715
Gary Keller, a promising art student, tests his new rifle by firing a random shot. Inadvertently, the shot kills his mentor—the local preacher—who happens to be driving along the road, directly in the line of fire. The car crashes and Kimble, having hitched a ride, hobbles away. A guilt-ridden Gary wants to confess, but his father, Steve, refuses to let him do so because it will destroy his promising future. The police arrive on the scene and falsely determine that Kimble murdered the man. They notify Gerard, already in New Mexico as Kimble had been spotted there four days prior. Gerard arrives in town to track Kimble down; meanwhile, Steve decides to take matters into his own hands by finding Kimble and hiding him so he does not implicate his son. Guest Stars: Beau Bridges as Gary Keller, Telly Savalas as Steve Keller, and Ellen Corby as Mrs. Barlow. • Barry Morse appears in this episode.
81	21	"Shadow of the Swan"	James Sheldon	Anthony Lawrence	Paul Keller Unknown	February 8, 1966	4719
At a carnival, Kimble meets Tina Andresen, an attractive young woman who helps him get a job. She introduces him to her uncle Harry, who is a retired police detective. Harry soon recognizes Kimble and tries to arrest him, but Tina helps Kimble get away and wants to run off with him, but he refuses. Tina, who is revealed to be a possessive sociopath, plots to betray Kimble for refusing her advances. Guest Stars: Joanna Pettet as Tina Andresen, Andrew Duggan as Harry Andresen.
82	22	"Running Scared"	James Sheldon	Don Brinkley	N/A Stafford/Fort Wayne, Indiana	February 22, 1966	4723
After learning of the death of his father, Richard Kimble contacts Donna and her husband, Len. Donna is distraught and desperately wants to meet Richard, and they arrange a meeting in Fort Wayne, Indiana. Donna and Len go there and check into a hotel under assumed names, but Donna is recognized by Mike Ballinger, the former prosecuting attorney at Richard Kimble's trial; Mike Ballinger is running for governor and his top aide persuades him that helping apprehend Richard Kimble will help him politically. Mike Ballinger calls Gerard to set up a trap, but Mike Ballinger's wife Harriet, fed up with Mike's non-stop campaigning and a resultant growing addiction to stimulants, hides Richard Kimble and helps him to rendezvous with Donna and Len. Guest Stars: Jacqueline Scott as Donna Taft, Lin McCarthy as Len Taft, James Daly as Michael Ballinger, and Joanne Linville as Harriet Ballinger. • Barry Morse appears in this episode.
83	23	"The Chinese Sunset"	James Sheldon	Leonard Kantor	Jack Fickett Sunset Strip, Los Angeles, California	March 1, 1966	4725
In this rare comparatively lighter episode (and a variation on Born Yesterday), Kimble is working as a general factotum in The Chinese Sunset hotel on Sunset Boulevard in Los Angeles. Penelope Dufour, a guest at the hotel, is an uneducated, uncultured 24-year-old trophy girlfriend of notorious bookie Eddie Slade. Worried that she may be losing Eddie's interest, while Eddie leaves town for a few weeks, Penelope recruits Kimble to tutor her on the fine art of socializing, manners, and improving her vocabulary. Meanwhile, an undercover policeman named Fred Bragin has checked into the hotel to keep tabs on Slade. But with Slade gone, Bragin focuses his surveillance on Penelope — and Kimble. Guest Stars: Laura Devon as Penelope Dufour, Paul Richards as Eddie Slade, Wayne Rogers as Sgt. Fred Bragin.
84	24	"Ill Wind"	Joseph Sargent	Al C. Ward	Mike Johnson San Martine County, Texas	March 8, 1966	4726
Gerard tracks Kimble to a migrant community in South Texas where he finally captures the Fugitive, who attempts to flee by train. However, a violent hurricane strikes the area and forces both of them to seek shelter in a fragile barn where most of the farm workers are gathered. When Gerard is badly injured when the roof collapses on him, Kimble, to the astonishment of the workers, actually helps try to save the lieutenant by helping transport him to another building where he pleads for a blood donor to save Gerard's life. Guest Stars: John McIntire as Lester Kelly, Jeanette Nolan as Naomi Kelly, Lonny Chapman as Jock Sims, Tim McIntire as Jonesie and Bonnie Beecher as Kate. • Barry Morse appears in this episode.
85	25	"With Strings Attached"	Leonard Horn	John Kneubuhl	Frank Carter Washington, D.C.	March 15, 1966	4727
Kimble is hired as a chauffeur by Geoffrey Martin—a gifted, but troubled, 17-year-old prodigy violinist. Geoffrey's demanding guardian and mentor, Max Pfeiffer, refuses to let Geoffrey go to college due to a contract obligating Geoffrey to continue performing until he is 21. In order to free himself from Pfeiffer, Geoffrey manipulates his assistant Ellen and Kimble into believing that Pfeiffer is emotionally destroying him. Martin's emotional meltdown becomes real when he takes Pfeiffer at gunpoint and learns that Kimble is wanted by the police, leaving him so confused he "frees" himself in bizarre fashion. Guest Stars: Rex Thompson as Geoffrey Martin, Donald Pleasence as Max Pfeiffer, Carol Rossen as Ellen Hardnett.
86	26	"The White Knight"	Robert Gist	Daniel B. Ullman	Dan Gordon Phoenix, Arizona	March 22, 1966	4728
After witnessing a small plane crash, Kimble rescues the pilot and the two passengers, senatorial candidate Glenn Madison, and his assistant, Pat Haynes. Glenn's PR man, Russ Haynes, Pat's husband, arranges for a sketch artist to draw a portrait of Glenn's rescuer who had left the scene. Russ locates Kimble and brings him to the Madison estate for Glenn to congratulate him for saving his life. Meanwhile, Glenn's wife, Claire, recognizes Kimble, and threatens to turn him in unless he tells her of the person that Glenn was seeing, aware of her husband's long history of infidelity. Kimble claims not to know anything. When Kimble confronts Pat, she admits to her affair with Glenn. Claire overhears the conversation and decides to destroy her husband's image. Guest Stars: Steven Hill as Glenn Madison, Jessica Walter as Pat Haynes, James Callahan as Russ Haynes, Nancy Wickwire as Claire Madison, and Ted Knight as Lt. Mooney.
87	27	"The 2130"	Leonard Horn	Daniel B. Ullman	Jack Davis/Bob Grant/Jack/William Smith Denver, Colorado/Walnut Grove, California/Portland, Oregon/New England	March 29, 1966	4724
While working as a chauffeur in Denver, Colorado, Kimble reluctantly covers for teenager Laurie Ryder after she dents her father's car. Kimble flees after discovering that Laurie was actually involved in a hit-and-run. After learning Kimble's identity, Laurie's father, Dr. Mark Ryder, summons Gerard, along with the entire Kimble file, to Denver, where he introduces Gerard to the 2130, a computer that he believes can help capture Kimble by determining a pattern to his travels. Guest Stars: Susan Albert as Laurie Ryder, Melvyn Douglas as Dr. Mark Ryder. • Barry Morse appears in this episode.
88	28	"A Taste of Tomorrow"	Leonard Horn	S : Mann Rubin; T : John Kneubuhl	Alan Mitchell Boise, Idaho	April 12, 1966	4729
Kimble meets Joe Tucker, another fugitive from justice, who claims that he was wrongly convicted of embezzlement four years earlier and wants to kill Charlie Fletcher, the man Tucker suspects is the real culprit. When Kimble discovers that Joe suffers from a dangerous illness, he tries to help him, but Tucker, delirious with the illness, escapes and tracks down Fletcher at his house, where he confronts him with a gun until Kimble helps prove Tucker's innocence. Guest Stars: Fritz Weaver as Joe Tucker, Michael Constantine as Ben Wyckoff, Brenda Scott as Sarah Tucker, and Dabbs Greer as Charlie Fletcher.
89	29	"In a Plain Paper Wrapper"	Richard Donner	S : Jackson Gillis and Glen A. Larson; T : John Kneubuhl	Bob Stoddard Iroquois, New York	April 19, 1966	4730
Kimble, working as a bartender in a local diner, becomes involved with waitress Susan Cartwright, but their growing romance is complicated by the arrival of Susan's orphaned nephew Gary, who is trying to break into a small group of local boys. When Gary recognizes Kimble, he tells the boys of his find and they decide to capture Kimble with a rifle they purchase from a magazine ad. Meanwhile, Susan's social worker, Mr. Shaw (played by Michael Strong), investigates Susan and her ability to raise Gary. Guest Stars: Kurt Russell as Eddie, Lois Nettleton as Susan Cartwright, Pat Cardi as Gary Reed, and Michael Shea as Rick. • Glen A. Larson's first writing credit. The last third season episode to be produced; the last black-and-white episode to be produced.
90	30	"Coralee"	Jerry Hopper	Joy Dexter	Tony Carter San Pedro, California	April 26, 1966	4711
After a diver dies in an underwater mishap, Kimble comes to the defense of the diver's girlfriend, who the locals believe is a jinx. Kimble knows that the death may have been due to negligence, knowledge that puts him in jeopardy. Guest Stars: Murray Hamilton as Joe Steelman, Antoinette Bower as Coralee Reynolds, Patricia Smith as Lucille Steelman, Dabney Coleman as George Graham, and James Frawley as Pete. • Aired as the last episode of season 3, although it was produced earlier, in mid-1965. It was the last black-and-white episode to be televised.
