= The Fugitive season 2 =

The Fugitive
- Season 2
- No. of episodes: 30

Release
- Original network: ABC
- Original release: September 15, 1964 – April 20, 1965

Season chronology
- ← Previous; Season 1 Next → Season 3

The second season of The Fugitive originally aired Tuesdays from 10:00-11:00 pm on ABC from September 15, 1964, to April 20, 1965. The season was released through two volumes on Region 1 DVDs, with the first volume (containing the first 15 episodes) being released on June 10, 2008, and Volume 2 being released on March 31, 2009.

== Episodes ==
No. overall	No. in season	Title	Directed by	Written by	Kimble's Alias and Location	Original release date	Prod. code
31	1	"Man in a Chariot"	Robert Butler	George Eckstein	Frank Borden Pennsylvania	September 15, 1964	4654
Kimble happens to watch a TV debate in which a once-renowned attorney, G. Stanley Lazer, claims that he could reverse Kimble's criminal conviction if the case went back to trial. Lazer, once a respected lawyer, had his license revoked after getting into a car accident years before while driving drunk, in which his wife was killed and left him a paraplegic. Lazer now spends his days teaching law at a small college in Harrisburg, Pennsylvania. Kimble travels to meet with Lazer and his assistant, Nancy Gilman, to enlist their help. To prove his theory, Lazer decides to conduct a mock trial with his students playing the prosecutor, defense lawyer, and jury in front of a live TV audience. While the mock trial is going on, Kimble becomes aware that Lazer is really putting himself on trial for his past misdeeds. Guest Stars: Ed Begley as G. Stanley Lazer, Robert Drivas as Lee Gould, Kathleen Maguire as Nancy Gilman and Harold Gould as Eller.
32	2	"World's End"	Robert Butler	Stuart Jerome	Mr. May Kansas City & Springvale, Missouri	September 22, 1964	4652
Kimble reads a want ad cryptically informing him about the murder of his wife Helen, with a message to phone Eleanor Burnett, the daughter of John Burnett, his defense attorney who is dead. Ellie and her mother Ada had hired a private detective named Keller (guest star Henry Beckman) to help find the one-armed man and they now think they have found him, but when Kimble arrives at the rendezvous with Ellie in Kansas City, she informs him that the one-armed man they discovered died in a fire. Kimble is devastated, but checks the story himself and believes it to be true. However, the private detective does some more checking and finds the one-armed man who died was incarcerated the night of Helen Kimble's murder, meaning Kimble can still find his wife's killer. Ellie, however, wants Kimble for herself and withholds this information and tells him that they should leave the county. Ellie also faces arrest as Gerard, a family friend of the Burnetts who had seen the ad and knew who had written it, has learned from a reluctant Ada of Ellie's rendezvous with Kimble and her plan to fly him out of the country. Guest Stars: Suzanne Pleshette as Eleanor Burnett, Carmen Mathews as Ada Burnett, Dabney Coleman as Sgt. Keith, and Paul Birch as Captain Carpenter. • Barry Morse appears in this episode.
33	3	"Man on a String"	Sydney Pollack	Harry Kronman, Barbara Merlin and Milton Merlin	Joe Walker Overton, Wyoming	September 29, 1964	4657
While walking down the road late at night, Kimble comes to the aid of Lucey Russell after her car has broken down. As gratitude, she provides him with a place to stay for the night. The next morning, the police find the dead body of Lars Adams, a married man who Lucey had been having an affair with, only a few feet from where her car broke down. As a result, Lucey is arrested for Lars' murder. Lars' wife, Amy, realizes that her husband was killed accidentally, but after learning of his philandering with Lucey, Amy decides that Lucey should take the rap. Kimble realizes that he can prove Lucey's innocence, but testifying for her could jeopardize his own freedom. Guest Stars: Lois Nettleton as Lucey Russell and John Larch as George Duncan.
34	4	"When the Bough Breaks"	Ralph Senensky	Story by : George Eckstein and James P. Griffith; Teleplay by : George Eckstein	Pete Broderick Grand Forks/Fargo, North Dakota	October 6, 1964	4659
While hopping freight trains, Kimble meets a young woman named Carol Hollister, who is traveling with her baby to meet up with her husband. Kimble does not know that Carol is actually a mentally disturbed escapee from the local insane asylum whose newborn baby died a year earlier and she has abducted another baby. Soon, Carol becomes so far gone that she mistakes Kimble for her late husband. Kimble must find a way to get the baby away from Carol and return him to his parents while avoiding the police. Guest Stars: Diana Hyland as Carol Hollister, Lin McCarthy as Malleson, Royal Dano as Preacher, and Sue Randall as Ruth Fisher.
35	5	"Nemesis"	Jerry Hopper	Harry Kronman	N/A Nothby, Bardon County, Wisconsin	October 13, 1964	4651
Gerard interrupts the vacation he is having with his young son when he gets a report from the sheriff of a rural community that Kimble is working there. Kimble escapes from his workplace at a hatchery just as Gerard and the local sheriff come to arrest him by stealing the sheriff's car. As Kimble drives off in the sheriff's car into a wooded region, he discovers that he has unwittingly kidnapped Gerard's young son, who is hiding in the backseat of the car. When the car runs out of gas Kimble and Phil Jr. set out on foot, but both soon run afoul of Corbin, a local hunter, and forest ranger Matt Davis. Guest Stars: Slim Pickens as Hank Corbin, Kurt Russell as Phil Jr., Bing Russell as Matt Davis, John Doucette as Sam Deebold, and Paul Birch as Captain Carpenter. • Barry Morse appears in this episode.
36	6	"Tiger Left, Tiger Right"	James Goldstone	Richard Levinson & William Link	Frank Jordan Eugene, Oregon	October 20, 1964	4660
While working as a gardener for Mike and Laura Pryor, Kimble is mistakenly abducted by Harold and Irene Cheyney. Harold is a Korean War veteran and former factory worker who lost the use of his legs after a truck owned by the Pryor's company hit him. After writing several letters to Mike Pryor asking about work and disability compensation and getting no response, Harold decides to kidnap Mike for a $100,000 ransom, but since Harold and Irene have never met or seen Mike Pryor, they abduct Kimble instead, after seeing Mike's son, Glenn, give more affection to Kimble than his distant father. Guest Stars: Leslie Nielsen as Harold Cheyney, Carol Rossen as Irene Cheyney, John Lasell as Michael Pryor, Jeanne Bal as Laura Pryor, David Sheiner as Lieutenant Hess, and Jeffrey Byron as Glenn.
37	7	"Tug of War"	Abner Biberman	Daniel B. Ullman	Paul Kelly Cornell, Trinity County, Idaho	October 27, 1964	4661
Kimble is working on a farm when he is captured by a former sheriff trying to re-live his glory days. They are soon joined by the current sheriff who tries to take over, but the old and new sheriff start arguing about how and when to turn Kimble over to the authorities, and the ruthless new sheriff will go to any lengths to make sure he gets all the credit for the capture. Guest Stars: Arthur O'Connell as Samuel Cole, Don Gordon as Deputy Sheriff Fallon, and Harry Townes as Art Mallet.
38	8	"Dark Corner"	Jerry Hopper	Harry Kronman	Jim Russell Sioux Falls, South Dakota	November 10, 1964	4655
Kimble finds refuge from the police in a rural farmhouse where he meets Mattie Braydon, a sculptor who suffers from hysterical blindness and lives with her older sister and their uncle. Mattie protects Kimble and hires him as a farmhand. While he is there, she also begins using him as a model for her clay sculptures she keeps in the barn. Kimble soon finds out that the sweet and innocent Mattie is in fact a possessive and manipulative sociopath who wants Kimble for herself and will do anything, including committing murder, to ensure dark secrets of her past never get revealed. Guest Stars: Tuesday Weld as Mattie Braydon, Elizabeth MacRae as Clara Braydon, Paul Carr as Bob Matthews, Crahan Denton as Sam Braydon, and John McLiam as Sheriff Grover.
39	9	"Escape into Black"	Jerry Hopper	Larry Cohen	Frank Barlow Decatur, Illinois	November 17, 1964	4653
On the verge of closing in on the one-armed man, Kimble is rendered an amnesiac after a freak gas explosion at a roadside diner when a stove blows up. While Kimble fights to regain his memory, a struggle ensues at the hospital between Margaret Ruskin (guest star Betty Garrett), a social worker who recognizes Kimble and believes him to be innocent, and a local physician, Dr. Towne (guest star Ivan Dixon), who believes Kimble to be guilty. Meanwhile, the one-armed man, whose name is revealed to be 'Fred Johnson', slips away after learning that Kimble is looking for him, but not before making an anonymous phone call to the police and Gerard about Kimble's whereabouts. Guest Star: Paul Birch as Captain Carpenter. • Barry Morse appears in this episode. • Bill Raisch makes his first credited appearance in the series. His character is listed in the credits as "One Armed Man".
40	10	"The Cage"	Walter Grauman	Sheldon Stark	Jeff Parker Puerto Viaje, Southern California	November 24, 1964	4662
While working as a handyman in the Hispanic fishing village of Puerto Viejo, Kimble becomes aware that the area has a plague epidemic and he's forced to call the state health inspector to have the entire area quarantined. Soon, he finds himself trapped when the local doctor suspects his true identity and the irate villagers set out to find him. Guest Stars: Joe De Santis as Joe Valdez, Brenda Scott as Carla Valdez, Tim O'Connor as Dr. Davis, Richard Evans as Miguel and John Kellogg as Officer Chrisman
41	11	"Cry Uncle"	James Goldstone	Philip Saltzman	Pat Thomas Donnivale, Illinois	December 1, 1964	4656
When robbers shoot two policemen, Kimble's nearby, so he hides in an orphanage's station wagon to get away from the dragnet. While hiding out in the orphanage as a volunteer, two orphans Kimble met beforehand promise they will alibi him by passing him off as their visiting uncle, but Sean Dubose, another state ward, plans to use Kimble in his own escape...fearing he will be shipped to an Illinois juvenile prison. Sean is embittered from being abandoned by his alcoholic uncle, after Sean's parents' deaths. Kimble is torn between an immediate but risky daylight escape, or helping the troublesome boy. Guest Stars: Edward Binns as Josh Kovaks, Ronny Howard as Gus, Donald Losby as Sean, Brett Somers as Miss Edmonds, and Rance Howard (uncredited).
42	12	"Detour on a Road Going Nowhere"	Ralph Senensky	Story by : Philip Saltzman; Teleplay by : Philip Saltzman and William D. Gordon	Stu Manning Indian Lake, Wyoming	December 8, 1964	4667
While working as a hotel steward in Wyoming, Kimble is forced to run after learning that another hotel employee steals hotel funds and Kimble becomes the suspect. Kimble escapes on a tour bus containing Mr. and Mrs. Langner (guest stars Lee Bowman and Phyllis Thaxter) a bickering couple, a visiting spinster named Louanne (guest star Elizabeth Allen), a local named Sandy Baird (guest star Don Quine), and the bus driver. But Kimble becomes trapped when the bus breaks down on a back road and all the passengers discover his secret when his identity is revealed over the radio. Held at gunpoint, Kimble must find a way to escape.
43	13	"The Iron Maiden"	Walter Grauman	Story by : Peter R. Brooke and Paul Lucey; Teleplay by : Paul Lucey and Harry Kronman	Parker Eronson, Nevada	December 15, 1964	4666
An industrial accident traps Kimble and some government workers along with a bickering congresswoman in an underground missile silo under construction. A member of the trapped group wants to turn Kimble in as soon as they are rescued while others want to help him. At the same time, Gerard waits above the only exit for Kimble to emerge. Guest Stars: Stephen McNally as Jack Glennon, Nan Martin as Congresswoman Marion Snell, Richard Anderson as Colonel Lawrence, Paul Lambert as Solomon, John McLiam as Alec Neal, Jason Wingreen as a photographer, and Christine White as Susan Lait. • Barry Morse appears in this episode.
44	14	"Devil's Carnival"	James Goldstone	William D. Gordon	N/A Corona, Georgia	December 22, 1964	4658
Kimble unwittingly hitches a ride with Hanes McClure, a wanted criminal out to settle a score in his Georgia hometown. When Hanes attempts to crash a barricade, Kimble grabs the wheel to save an innocent life, but it gets both of them arrested. Both Kimble and Hanes then endure the spectacle the small town makes because of the double arrest. Guest Star: Warren Oates as Hanes McClure.
45	15	"Ballad for a Ghost"	Walter Grauman	Story by : Sidney Ellis and George Eckstein; Teleplay by : George Eckstein	Pete Glenn South of Salisbury, Ohio	December 29, 1964	4668
While working as a rural hotel porter, Kimble finds himself working with Hallie Martin (guest star Janis Paige), a lounge singer who bears a strong resemblance to his late wife, Helen. Hallie knows of the resemblance and Kimble is in danger when Hallie's husband becomes jealous.
46	16	"Brass Ring"	Abner Biberman	Leonard Kantor	Ben Horton Santa Monica, California	January 5, 1965	4671
In Santa Monica, California, Kimble is hired by Norma Sessions to help care for her invalid brother, Leslie, who was crippled in a car accident. Kimble does not realize that Norma, with her boyfriend Lars, are plotting to murder Leslie to collect his insurance money. When Norma suspects Kimble is hiding from the police, she plots to frame him for Leslie's murder. Guest Stars: Robert Duvall as Leslie, Angie Dickinson as Norma, and John Ericson as Lars
47	17	"The End Is But the Beginning"	Walter Grauman	Story by : George Fass; Teleplay by : George Fass and Arthur Weiss	Steve Younger Hurley, Pennsylvania	January 12, 1965	4664
Working for a delivery firm, Kimble takes on an Army veteran hitching a ride. Farther down the road they get into a bad crash and the Army vet dies. Kimble, thrown from the truck, takes advantage of the accident to try and convince Gerard that he is now dead, and he gets help from his co-worker Aimee Rennick. But when a stunned Gerard flies to the area to verify Kimble's death, Kimble realizes the Army vet had dog tags that will discredit the ruse if they are found. Guest Stars: Berniece Janssen (David Janssen's mother; uncredited), Barbara Barrie as Aimee Rennick, Andrew Duggan as John Harlan, and Paul Birch as Captain Carpenter. • Barry Morse appears in this episode.
48	18	"Nicest Fella You'd Ever Want to Meet"	Sutton Roley	Jack Turley	Richard Clark Bixton, Arizona	January 19, 1965	4670
While travelling through a small town in Arizona, Kimble is arrested by Sheriff Joe Bob Sims, a brutal and corrupt lawman. Sims, unaware of Kimble's true identity, subjects him to slave labour with a group of other vagrants he arrests on a daily basis for no other reason than to torture and/or humiliate them. When Kimble witnesses Sims murder another prisoner and has the equally corrupt mayor and town council cover it up to look like an accident, Kimble becomes aware that his own life is in danger. Guest Stars: Pat Hingle as Sheriff Joe Bob Sims, Tom Skerritt as Neeley Hollister, Mary Murphy as Thelma Hollister, and Dabney Coleman as Floyd Pierce.
49	19	"Fun and Games and Party Favors"	Abner Biberman	Arthur Weiss	Douglas Beckett The hills above Los Angeles	January 26, 1965	4663
While working as a chauffeur for a wealthy family, Kimble learns that the teenage daughter of the family is dating the pool cleaner. While chaperoning a party for the daughter's friends, Kimble throws out an unruly teenager who had crashed the party. Kimble is soon faced with blackmail when the teen turns out to be a crime buff and recognizes Kimble from a police magazine. Guest Stars: Katherine Crawford as Joanne Glenn, Mark Goddard as Dan Holt, and Pete Duel as Buzzy
50	20	"Scapegoat"	Alexander Singer	Story by : Larry Cohen; Teleplay by : William D. Gordon	Eddie Fry Black River, South Dakota	February 2, 1965	4672
A man who knew Kimble during one of his disguises meets up with him again. He tells him that on one of his hurried, silent departures from a town, he left behind evidence which indicated he was dead and an innocent man is being held for his murder. Kimble returns to the town only to learn that the man had been killed while trying to escape from jail months earlier, and his two sons blame Kimble for their father's fate. Guest Stars: Dianne Foster as Janice Cummings, John Anderson as Justin Briggs, Harry Townes as Ballinger and Bill Erwin as the bar patron.
51	21	"Corner of Hell"	Robert Butler	Story by : Jo Heims and Zahrini Machadah; Teleplay by : Jo Heims and Francis Irby Gwaltney	Paul Hunter Beeker, Louisiana	February 9, 1965	4665
On the run from Gerard, Kimble stumbles onto private property belonging to a family of moonshiners. When Gerard gives chase on foot, he too is caught by the backwoods family and is accused of attacking one of the girls in the family. Kimble has to decide how to keep Gerard detained and not killed by the family while planning his own escape. Guest Stars: R. G. Armstrong as Tully, Bruce Dern as Cody, Sharon Farrell as Elvie, and Paul Birch as Captain Carpenter. • Barry Morse appears in this episode.
52	22	"Moon Child"	Alexander Singer	Daniel B. Ullman	Bill Martin Michigan	February 16, 1965	4673
Kimble arrives in a small town where women are being murdered by an unknown serial killer and a vigilante mob mistakes Kimble, a stranger in town, of being the killer. Kimble hides out with a mentally challenged young woman named Joanne Mercer, a 'moon child'. She befriends Kimble and hides him in the basement of her house, which is connected by a tunnel to a closed-down textile factory on the outskirts of town where the real killer is hiding out. Guest Stars: Murray Hamilton as Mel Starling, June Harding as Joanne Mercer, David Sheiner as Sheriff Mack, Virginia Christine as Alma Mercer, and Harry Dean Stanton as Randy.
53	23	"The Survivors"	Don Medford	George Eckstein	N/A Fairgreen, Indiana	March 2, 1965	4674
Four years after his wife's death, Kimble has learned that his father-in-law, Ed Waverly (guest star Lloyd Gough), is facing bankruptcy because of his wife Edith's (guest star Ruth White) heart trouble which is believed to be brought on because she still clings to the memory of Helen. Barely escaping a police dragnet, Kimble contacts Ed and hides in their home, where he finds support from his sister-in-law, Terry (guest star Louise Sorel). Kimble knows of a secret bank account Helen kept in case of an emergency and needs help finding it. Edith's grief for Helen leaves her incessantly listening to phonograph records made by Helen containing lengthy audio letters to her and Ed, leading to a savage argument between Edith and Terry and leaves Kimble in even greater danger because Terry is in love with him and Edith, upon learning of his presence, icily vows to turn him over to the police. Guest Stars: Diane Brewster (uncredited) as Helen Kimble in recorded messages (voice only)
54	24	"Everybody Gets Hit in the Mouth Sometime"	Alexander Singer	Jack Turley	Bill Douglas Colorado Springs, Colorado	March 9, 1965	4675
While working as a truck driver for a small freight company, Kimble discovers that his angry and bitter boss, Gus Hendrick, is being blackmailed into paying bills and child support by Lucia Mayfield ever since her husband was killed a year earlier in a driving accident. Kimble later learns that with Hendrick strapped for money and Lucia merely squandering the blackmail money for her own selfish purposes, Hendrick plans to hijack one of his own trucks to collect an insurance settlement. Guest Stars: Jack Klugman as Gus Hendrick, Geraldine Brooks as Lucia Mayfield, and Michael Constantine as Ernie Svoboda.
55	25	"May God Have Mercy"	Don Medford	Don Brinkley	Harry Reynolds Selma, Michigan	March 16, 1965	4676
While working as a hospital orderly, Kimble is recognized by Victor Leonetti and his wife, Anne, who hold Kimble responsible for the death of their daughter. Kimble tries to flee, but gets shot and is forced to undergo surgery for the gunshot wounds. When Victor learns that Kimble was trying to contact a specialist at the time of the girl's death, he tries to make amends by confessing to Gerard that he was the one who murdered Helen Kimble. Guest Stars: Telly Savalas as Victor Leonetti, Carol Rossen as Anne Leonetti, and Norman Fell as Lt. Cermak. • Barry Morse appears in this episode.
56	26	"Masquerade"	Abner Biberman	Philip Saltzman	Leonard Hull Clay City, Oklahoma	March 23, 1965	4669
While travelling through a small Oklahoma town, Kimble is taken into police custody after they mistake him for Leonard Hull, a former numbers runner about to testify against a big-time racketeer. Hull had run away from the witness relocation program in that very town. Kimble is taken to a motel where Leonard's wife, Mavis, knows he's not Leonard Hull. Kimble asks for her help to get away from the police and a local hitman pursuing them. Guest Stars: Norma Crane as Mavis Hull, Ed Asner as Sheriff Cliff Mayhew, and John Milford as Leonard Hull and James Doohan as Cop #1.
57	27	"Runner in the Dark"	Alexander Singer	Robert Guy Barrows	Tom Burns/ Phil Meade Rutledge, Ohio	March 30, 1965	4677
A woman calls the police after she recognizes Kimble's picture on a TV quiz show and in the ensuing manhunt, Kimble hides out in a home for the blind. Kimble becomes acquainted with some of the residents, including the attractive Claire Whittaker, as well as Bob Sterne, who Kimble discovers is not really blind. Bob was actually temporarily blinded in a school bus accident months before and he blames himself since he was driving drunk at the time. One of the other residents is Dan Brady, a veteran lawman who was blinded in the line of duty and remains bitter for having lost his position as the town's sheriff to the younger, more educated, but less experienced, Barney Vilattic. When Brady suspects Kimble's true identity, he sees an opportunity to capture the fugitive to reclaim his former job. Guest Stars: Ed Begley as Dan Brady, Richard Anderson as Barney Vilattic, Diana Van Der Vlis as Claire Whittaker, Peter Haskell as Bob Sterne, and Vaughn Taylor as Mayor Penfield.
58	28	"A.P.B."	William D. Gordon	Daniel B. Ullman	Ed Morris Topeka, Kansas	April 6, 1965	4678
Kimble hops onto a freight train and finds himself in the company of three escaped convicts, two of whom that were wounded during their escape. One of the convicts dies from his wounds while the second one, a brutal murderer named Neil Pinkerton, forces Kimble to treat his leg wound. Pinkerton decides to keep Kimble as a hostage as a safeguard against the police. Pinkerton, Kimble, and the other prisoner, Matt Mooney, seek refuge in a farmhouse owned by widow Mona Ross and her mother, who recognize all of them and treat their captors as celebrities. Guest Stars: Paul Richards as Neil Pinkerton, Lou Antonio as Matt Mooney, Shirley Knight as Mona Ross, Virginia Gregg as Mrs. Ross, and Fred Beir as Lieutenant Peterson.
59	29	"The Old Man Picked a Lemon"	Alexander Singer	Jack Turley	Jim Wallace Encinas County, California	April 13, 1965	4679
While Kimble is working as a ranch hand on a California citrus farm, the owner, Leland Hagerman, suddenly dies in a tractor accident. The man's greedy, self-serving and spiteful son, Blaine, arrives to stake his claim to the estate, run his stepmother out by any means necessary, and harass the migrant workers who despise him. When Blaine discovers Kimble's true identity and calls the authorities, Kimble must make his escape before they close in. Guest Stars: Celeste Holm as Flo Hagerman, Ben Piazza as Blaine Hagerman, Rodolfo Hoyos as Rafael, Michael Davis as Paco Flores, Byron Morrow as Leland Hagerman, and Jean Hale as Lisa.
60	30	"Last Second of a Big Dream"	Robert Butler	Story by : Jack F. Eastman; Teleplay by : George Eckstein	Nick Peters Morgantown, Nebraska	April 20, 1965	4680
While working as a carnie at a local circus, the scheming co-owner Barry Craft (guest star Steve Forrest) recognizes Kimble when Gerard arrives looking for the fugitive. Barry at first does not tell Gerard about Kimble working there for he figures he will get some publicity by arranging to have Kimble captured at his circus first by calling the local press. Barry's employer Major Fielding (guest star Laurence Naismith) is against this but after going along with capturing Kimble, decides to allow him to escape by setting loose a dangerous tiger. Guest Stars: Milton Selzer as Lou Cartwright, Robert Karnes as Sheriff Rails, and James B. Sikking as Bert. • Barry Morse appears in this episode.
