= List of The Fugitive episodes =

This is a complete list of episodes for the ABC television drama series The Fugitive. The first episode aired on September 17, 1963, and the series finale aired with a two-part episode entitled "The Judgment" on August 22 and August 29, 1967 – purposefully held back to build suspense, aired just before the start of the next television season. The series ran for four seasons with 30 episodes each, bringing it to a total of 120, 90 in black and white (seasons 1–3) and 30 in color (season 4).

== Series overview ==
Season	Episodes	Originally released	
Season	Episodes	First released	Last released
1	30	September 17, 1963	April 21, 1964
2	30	September 15, 1964	April 20, 1965
3	30	September 14, 1965	April 26, 1966
4	30	September 13, 1966	August 29, 1967

== Episodes ==
=== Season 1 (1963–64) ===
The first season contains a total of 30 episodes which were originally broadcast in the United States from September 17, 1963, to April 21, 1964.

No. overall	No. in season	Title	Directed by	Written by	Kimble's Alias and Location	Original release date	Prod. code
1	1	"Fear in a Desert City"	Walter Grauman	Stanford Whitmore	James Lincoln Tucson, Arizona	September 17, 1963	4600
2	2	"The Witch"	Andrew McCullough	William D. Gordon	Jim Fowler Hainesville, Missouri	September 24, 1963	4604
3	3	"The Other Side of the Mountain"	James Sheldon	Story by : Alan Caillou; Teleplay by : Alan Caillou and Harry Kronman	N/A West Virginia	October 1, 1963	4605
4	4	"Never Wave Goodbye"	William A. Graham	Hank Searls	Jeff Cooper Santa Barbara, California	October 8, 1963	4606
5	5	"Never Wave Goodbye"	William A. Graham	Hank Searls	Jeff Cooper Santa Barbara, California	October 15, 1963	4607
6	6	"Decision in the Ring"	Robert Ellis Miller	Arthur Weiss	Ray Miller Los Angeles, California	October 22, 1963	4601
7	7	"Smoke Screen"	Claudio Guzman	John D. F. Black	Joseph Walker The Imperial Valley, California	October 29, 1963	4603
8	8	"See Hollywood and Die"	Andrew McCullough	George Eckstein	Al Fleming Sierra Point, New Mexico/ Flagstaff, Arizona/ Hollywood, California	November 5, 1963	4608
9	9	"Ticket to Alaska"	Jerry Hopper	Oliver Crawford	Larry Talman Off the coast of British Columbia	November 12, 1963	4610
10	10	"Fatso"	Ida Lupino	Robert Pirosh	Bill Carter Ellsmore, Kentucky	November 19, 1963	4611
11	11	"Nightmare at Northoak"	Christian Nyby	Stuart Jerome	George Porter Northoak, New Hampshire	November 26, 1963	4612
12	12	"Glass Tightrope"	Ida Lupino	Story by : Robert C. Dennis and Barry Trivers; Teleplay by : Robert C. Dennis	Harry Carson Sioux City, Iowa	December 3, 1963	4614
13	13	"Terror at High Point"	Jerry Hopper	Story by : Peter Germano; Teleplay by : Peter Germano and Harry Kronman	Paul Beaumont North of Salt Lake City, Utah	December 17, 1963	4613
14	14	"The Girl from Little Egypt"	Vincent McEveety	Stanford Whitmore	George Browning/ George Norton San Francisco, California	December 24, 1963	4602
15	15	"Home Is the Hunted"	Jerry Hopper	Arthur Weiss	N/A Stafford, Indiana	January 7, 1964	4616
16	16	"The Garden House"	Ida Lupino	Sheldon Stark	Sanford Westborne, Connecticut	January 14, 1964	4617
17	17	"Come Watch Me Die"	Laslo Benedek	Story by : Perry Bleecker; Teleplay by : Stanford Whitmore	Ben Rogers Black Moccasin, Tyler County, Nebraska	January 21, 1964	4615
18	18	"Where the Action Is"	James Sheldon	Harry Kronman	Jerry Shelton Reno, Nevada	January 28, 1964	4609
19	19	"Search in a Windy City"	Jerry Hopper	Stuart Jerome	N/A Chicago, Illinois	February 4, 1964	4618
20	20	"Bloodline"	John Erman	Story by : John Hawkins and Harry Kronman; Teleplay by : Harry Kronman	Dick Lindsey Bodin Russet Kennel, Virginia	February 11, 1964	4619
21	21	"Rat in a Corner"	Jerry Hopper	Story by : William Wood; Teleplay by : Sheldon Stark and William Wood	Dan Crowley Youngstown/Bolton, Ohio	February 18, 1964	4620
22 23	22 23	"Angels Travel on Lonely Roads"	Walter Grauman	Al C. Ward	Nick Walker Nevada (Part 1); Nevada and California (Part 2)	February 25, 1964 March 3, 1964	4621 4622
24	24	"Flight from the Final Demon"	Jerry Hopper	Philip Saltzman	Al Dexter Meadville, Michigan	March 10, 1964	4623
25	25	"Taps for a Dead War"	William A. Graham	Story by : Harry Kronman and Merwin Gerard; Teleplay by : Harry Kronman	Bob Davies Springfield, Illinois	March 17, 1964	4624
26	26	"Somebody to Remember"	Jerry Hopper	Robert C. Dennis	Johnny Sherman Unknown	March 24, 1964	4625
27	27	"Never Stop Running"	William A. Graham	Sheldon Stark	Doc Bellinda, New Mexico	March 31, 1964	4626
28	28	"The Homecoming"	Jerry Hopper	Peter Germano	David Benton Tidewater, Georgia	April 7, 1964	4627
29	29	"Storm Center"	William A. Graham	George Eckstein	Larry Phelps Webers Landing/ Key Blanca, Florida	April 14, 1964	4628
30	30	"The End Game"	Jerry Hopper	Stanford Whitmore	N/A Chicago, Illinois	April 21, 1964	4629

=== Season 2 (1964–65) ===
The second season contains a total of 30 episodes which were originally broadcast in the United States from September 15, 1964, to April 20, 1965.

No. overall	No. in season	Title	Directed by	Written by	Kimble's Alias and Location	Original release date	Prod. code
31	1	"Man in a Chariot"	Robert Butler	George Eckstein	Frank Borden Pennsylvania	September 15, 1964	4654
32	2	"World's End"	Robert Butler	Stuart Jerome	Mr. May Kansas City & Springvale, Missouri	September 22, 1964	4652
33	3	"Man on a String"	Sydney Pollack	Harry Kronman, Barbara Merlin and Milton Merlin	Joe Walker Overton, Wyoming	September 29, 1964	4657
34	4	"When the Bough Breaks"	Ralph Senensky	Story by : George Eckstein and James P. Griffith; Teleplay by : George Eckstein	Pete Broderick Grand Forks/Fargo, North Dakota	October 6, 1964	4659
35	5	"Nemesis"	Jerry Hopper	Harry Kronman	N/A Nothby, Bardon County, Wisconsin	October 13, 1964	4651
36	6	"Tiger Left, Tiger Right"	James Goldstone	Richard Levinson & William Link	Frank Jordan Eugene, Oregon	October 20, 1964	4660
37	7	"Tug of War"	Abner Biberman	Daniel B. Ullman	Paul Kelly Cornell, Trinity County, Idaho	October 27, 1964	4661
38	8	"Dark Corner"	Jerry Hopper	Harry Kronman	Jim Russell Sioux Falls, South Dakota	November 10, 1964	4655
39	9	"Escape into Black"	Jerry Hopper	Larry Cohen	Frank Barlow Decatur, Illinois	November 17, 1964	4653
40	10	"The Cage"	Walter Grauman	Sheldon Stark	Jeff Parker Puerto Viaje, Southern California	November 24, 1964	4662
41	11	"Cry Uncle"	James Goldstone	Philip Saltzman	Pat Thomas Donnivale, Illinois	December 1, 1964	4656
42	12	"Detour on a Road Going Nowhere"	Ralph Senensky	Story by : Philip Saltzman; Teleplay by : Philip Saltzman and William D. Gordon	Stu Manning Indian Lake, Wyoming	December 8, 1964	4667
43	13	"The Iron Maiden"	Walter Grauman	Story by : Peter R. Brooke and Paul Lucey; Teleplay by : Paul Lucey and Harry Kronman	Parker Eronson, Nevada	December 15, 1964	4666
44	14	"Devil's Carnival"	James Goldstone	William D. Gordon	N/A Corona, Georgia	December 22, 1964	4658
45	15	"Ballad for a Ghost"	Walter Grauman	Story by : Sidney Ellis and George Eckstein; Teleplay by : George Eckstein	Pete Glenn South of Salisbury, Ohio	December 29, 1964	4668
46	16	"Brass Ring"	Abner Biberman	Leonard Kantor	Ben Horton Santa Monica, California	January 5, 1965	4671
47	17	"The End Is But the Beginning"	Walter Grauman	Story by : George Fass; Teleplay by : George Fass and Arthur Weiss	Steve Younger Hurley, Pennsylvania	January 12, 1965	4664
48	18	"Nicest Fella You'd Ever Want to Meet"	Sutton Roley	Jack Turley	Richard Clark Bixton, Arizona	January 19, 1965	4670
49	19	"Fun and Games and Party Favors"	Abner Biberman	Arthur Weiss	Douglas Beckett The hills above Los Angeles	January 26, 1965	4663
50	20	"Scapegoat"	Alexander Singer	Story by : Larry Cohen; Teleplay by : William D. Gordon	Eddie Fry Black River, South Dakota	February 2, 1965	4672
51	21	"Corner of Hell"	Robert Butler	Story by : Jo Heims and Zahrini Machadah; Teleplay by : Jo Heims and Francis Irby Gwaltney	Paul Hunter Beeker, Louisiana	February 9, 1965	4665
52	22	"Moon Child"	Alexander Singer	Daniel B. Ullman	Bill Martin Michigan	February 16, 1965	4673
53	23	"The Survivors"	Don Medford	George Eckstein	N/A Fairgreen, Indiana	March 2, 1965	4674
54	24	"Everybody Gets Hit in the Mouth Sometime"	Alexander Singer	Jack Turley	Bill Douglas Colorado Springs, Colorado	March 9, 1965	4675
55	25	"May God Have Mercy"	Don Medford	Don Brinkley	Harry Reynolds Selma, Michigan	March 16, 1965	4676
56	26	"Masquerade"	Abner Biberman	Philip Saltzman	Leonard Hull Clay City, Oklahoma	March 23, 1965	4669
57	27	"Runner in the Dark"	Alexander Singer	Robert Guy Barrows	Tom Burns/ Phil Meade Rutledge, Ohio	March 30, 1965	4677
58	28	"A.P.B."	William D. Gordon	Daniel B. Ullman	Ed Morris Topeka, Kansas	April 6, 1965	4678
59	29	"The Old Man Picked a Lemon"	Alexander Singer	Jack Turley	Jim Wallace Encinas County, California	April 13, 1965	4679
60	30	"Last Second of a Big Dream"	Robert Butler	Story by : Jack F. Eastman; Teleplay by : George Eckstein	Nick Peters Morgantown, Nebraska	April 20, 1965	4680

=== Season 3 (1965–66) ===
The third season contains a total of 30 episodes which were originally broadcast in the United States from September 14, 1965, to April 26, 1966.

No. overall	No. in season	Title	Directed by	Written by	Kimble's Alias and Location	Original release date	Prod. code
61	1	"Wings of an Angel"	William A. Graham	S : Otto King; S/T : Don Brinkley	George Egan Oklahoma	September 14, 1965	4701
62	2	"Middle of a Heat Wave"	Alexander Singer	Robert Hamner	Jim Owen Lake City, New York	September 21, 1965	4709
63	3	"Crack in a Crystal Ball"	Walter Grauman	Richard Levinson & William Link	Joe Warren St. Anne & Spring City, Minnesota	September 28, 1965	4705
64	4	"Trial by Fire"	Alexander Singer	Philip Saltzman	N/A Chicago, Illinois	October 5, 1965	4706
65	5	"Conspiracy of Silence"	Jerry Hopper	William D. Gordon	Fred Tate 62 miles from Reeseburg, Arizona	October 12, 1965	4704
66	6	"Three Cheers for Little Boy Blue"	Walter Grauman	T : Harry Kronman; S/T : Chester Krumholz	Tom Nash Ardmore, Iowa	October 19, 1965	4703
67	7	"All the Scared Rabbits"	Robert Butler	T : Norman Lessing; S/T : William Bast	Joe Taft Iowa/Dalhart, Texas/Dos Palos, New Mexico	October 26, 1965	4713
68	8	"An Apple a Day"	Ralph Senensky	Daniel B. Ullman	Ed Curtis Briar County, Colorado	November 2, 1965	4710
69 70	9 10	"Landscape with Running Figures"	Walter Grauman	Anthony Wilson	Steve Carver Wichita, Fredonia & Tilden, Kansas	November 16, 1965 November 23, 1965	4707 4708
71	11	"Set Fire to a Straw Man"	Don Medford	Jack Turley	Chris Benson Tracton, New Jersey	November 30, 1965	4702
72	12	"Stranger in the Mirror"	Joseph Sargent	Don Brinkley	John Evans Sona Falls, Washington	December 7, 1965	4718
73	13	"The Good Guys and the Bad Guys"	Alexander Singer	Don Brinkley	Bill Watkins Drover City, Montana	December 14, 1965	4714
74	14	"End of the Line"	William A. Graham	James Menzies	Bob Mossman Raiford & Fort Scott, Florida	December 21, 1965	4717
75	15	"When the Wind Blows"	Ralph Senensky	Betty Langdon	Jim McGuire Smallgroves, Wyoming	December 28, 1965	4712
76	16	"Not with a Whimper"	Alexander Singer	Norman Lessing	Richard Spaulding Hempstead Mills, West Virginia	January 4, 1966	4720
77	17	"Wife Killer"	Richard Donner	Daniel B. Ullman	N/A Baker City, Michigan	January 11, 1966	4716
78	18	"This'll Kill You"	Alex March	George Eckstein	Nick Phillips Yonkers, New York	January 18, 1966	4722
79	19	"Echo of a Nightmare"	James Sheldon	S : Robert Lewin; T : John Kneubuhl	Richard Taylor A city and area near Redlands, California	January 25, 1966	4721
80	20	"Stroke of Genius"	Robert Butler	John Kneubuhl	Frank Whistler Santa Elena, New Mexico	February 1, 1966	4715
81	21	"Shadow of the Swan"	James Sheldon	Anthony Lawrence	Paul Keller Unknown	February 8, 1966	4719
82	22	"Running Scared"	James Sheldon	Don Brinkley	N/A Stafford/Fort Wayne, Indiana	February 22, 1966	4723
83	23	"The Chinese Sunset"	James Sheldon	Leonard Kantor	Jack Fickett Sunset Strip, Los Angeles, California	March 1, 1966	4725
84	24	"Ill Wind"	Joseph Sargent	Al C. Ward	Mike Johnson San Martine County, Texas	March 8, 1966	4726
85	25	"With Strings Attached"	Leonard Horn	John Kneubuhl	Frank Carter Washington, D.C.	March 15, 1966	4727
86	26	"The White Knight"	Robert Gist	Daniel B. Ullman	Dan Gordon Phoenix, Arizona	March 22, 1966	4728
87	27	"The 2130"	Leonard Horn	Daniel B. Ullman	Jack Davis/Bob Grant/Jack/William Smith Denver, Colorado/Walnut Grove, California/Portland, Oregon/New England	March 29, 1966	4724
88	28	"A Taste of Tomorrow"	Leonard Horn	S : Mann Rubin; T : John Kneubuhl	Alan Mitchell Boise, Idaho	April 12, 1966	4729
89	29	"In a Plain Paper Wrapper"	Richard Donner	S : Jackson Gillis and Glen A. Larson; T : John Kneubuhl	Bob Stoddard Iroquois, New York	April 19, 1966	4730
90	30	"Coralee"	Jerry Hopper	Joy Dexter	Tony Carter San Pedro, California	April 26, 1966	4711

=== Season 4 (1966–67) ===
The fourth season (filmed in color) contains a total of 30 episodes which were originally broadcast in the United States from September 13, 1966, to August 29, 1967.

No. overall	No. in season	Title	Directed by	Written by	Kimble's Alias and Location	Original release date	Prod. code
91	1	"The Last Oasis"	Gerald Mayer	Barry Oringer	David Morrow Puma County, Arizona	September 13, 1966	4751
92	2	"Death is the Door Prize"	Don Medford	Oliver Crawford	Ed Sanders Los Angeles, California	September 20, 1966	4753
93	3	"A Clean and Quiet Town"	Mark Rydell	Howard Browne	Paul Miller Clark City, Kentucky	September 27, 1966	4754
94	4	"The Sharp Edge of Chivalry"	Gerald Mayer	Sam Ross	Carl Baker A large, midwestern city	October 4, 1966	4757
95	5	"Ten Thousand Pieces of Silver"	James Neilson	T : Wilton Schiller; S/T : E. Arthur Kean	Dave Livingston Monroe County, Pennsylvania	October 11, 1966	4759
96	6	"Joshua's Kingdom"	Gerd Oswald	Lee Loeb	Jim Corman Diablo County, Utah	October 18, 1966	4756
97	7	"Second Sight"	Robert Douglas	Daniel B. Ullman	Jack Anderson Pittsburgh, Pennsylvania	October 25, 1966	4752
98	8	"Wine Is a Traitor"	Gerd Oswald	Howard Dimsdale	Taylor Grandee, California	November 1, 1966	4760
99	9	"Approach with Care"	William Hale	Lee Loeb	Pete Allen Londale, New Mexico	November 15, 1966	4761
100	10	"Nobody Loses All the Time"	Lawrence Dobkin	E. Arthur Kean	Dr. Harry Robertson Somewhere in Ohio	November 22, 1966	4758
101	11	"Right in the Middle of the Season"	Christian Nyby	Sam Ross	Eddie Carter A fishing island off the Southern California coast	November 29, 1966	4763
102	12	"The Devil's Disciples"	Jud Taylor	S : Robert Dillon; T : Jeri Emmett; S/T : Steven W. Carabatsos	N/A An area near Twin Forks Junction, in the American Southwest	December 6, 1966	4762
103	13	"The Blessings of Liberty"	Joseph Pevney	Daniel B. Ullman	Ben Russell San Pedro, Los Angeles, California	December 20, 1966	4755
104	14	"The Evil Men Do"	Jesse Hibbs	Walter Brough	Russell Jordan The Poconos and Pittsburgh, Pennsylvania	December 27, 1966	4767
105	15	"Run the Man Down"	James Sheldon	S : Fred Freiberger; T : Barry Oringer	Tom Anderson In the Strawberry Mountain (Oregon) range, Oregon	January 3, 1967	4764
106	16	"The Other Side of the Coin"	Lewis Allen	Sam Ross	Jim Parker Ocean Grove, California	January 10, 1967	4766
107	17	"The One That Got Away"	Leo Penn	Philip Saltzman and Harry Kronman	Bill March Southern California, and Tanango, Baja California, Mexico	January 17, 1967	4765
108	18	"Concrete Evidence"	Murray Golden	T : Jeri Emmett; S/T : Jack Turley	Steve Dexter Coleman, Nebraska	January 24, 1967	4769
109	19	"The Breaking of the Habit"	John Meredyth Lucas	John Meredyth Lucas	Tom Marlow Sacramento and Tarleton, California	January 31, 1967	4768
110	20	"There Goes the Ball Game"	Gerald Mayer	Oliver Crawford	Gene Tyler Anaheim, California	February 7, 1967	4770
111	21	"The Ivy Maze"	John Meredyth Lucas	Edward Hume	Jerry Sinclair Wellington, Iowa	February 21, 1967	4771
112	22	"Goodbye My Love"	Lewis Allen	Lee Loeb	Bill Garrison Southern California	February 28, 1967	4772
113	23	"Passage to Helena"	Richard Benedict	Barry Oringer	Tom Barrett Wyler City, Montana	March 7, 1967	4773
114	24	"The Savage Street"	Gerald Mayer	T : Jeri Emmett; S/T : Mario Alcalde	Tony Maxwell A large city in the Northeast	March 14, 1967	4774
115	25	"Death of a Very Small Killer"	John Meredyth Lucas	Barry Oringer	Thomas Barrett Puerta Banales, Central America	March 21, 1967	4775
116	26	"Dossier on a Diplomat"	Gerald Mayer	T : Jeri Emmett; S/T : J. T. Gallard	Charlie Farrell Washington, D.C.	March 28, 1967	4776
117	27	"The Walls of Night"	John Meredyth Lucas	Lawrence L. Goldman	Stan Dyson Portland, Oregon/Lake Shohalis, Washington	April 4, 1967	4777
118	28	"The Shattered Silence"	Barry Morse	S : Ralph Goodman; T : Barry Oringer	Ben Lewis Pinedale, Washington	April 11, 1967	4778
119 120	29 30	"The Judgment"	Don Medford	George Eckstein and Michael Zagor	Frank Davis (Part 1); N/A (Part 2) Tucson, Arizona & Los Angeles, California (Part 1); Stafford, Indiana (Part 2)	August 22, 1967 August 29, 1967	4779 4780
