= The Fugitive season 4 =

The Fugitive
- Season 4
- No. of episodes: 30

Release
- Original network: ABC
- Original release: September 13, 1966 – August 29, 1967

Season chronology
- ← Previous; Season 3

The fourth and final season of The Fugitive was filmed in color, and was originally aired Tuesdays at 10:00-11:00 pm on ABC from September 13, 1966, to August 29, 1967. The season was released through two volumes on Region 1 DVDs, with Volume 1 (containing the first 15 episodes) released on November 2, 2010, and Volume 2 released on February 15, 2011.

At the time of its initial airing, "The Judgment: Part 2" was the highest-rated episode of a TV series until the record was surpassed by the Dallas episode "Who Done It" thirteen years later. This same episode also surpassed the national viewership record set by the historic first appearance of the Beatles on The Ed Sullivan Show three years earlier, with an estimated 78 million viewers. This was then broken by the Roots episode "Part VIII" in 1977.

== Episodes ==
No. overall	No. in season	Title	Directed by	Written by	Kimble's Alias and Location	Original release date	Prod. code
91	1	"The Last Oasis"	Gerald Mayer	Barry Oringer	David Morrow Puma County, Arizona	September 13, 1966	4751
Shot during a police chase, Kimble seeks refuge at an orphanage near a Navajo Indian reservation in Puma County, Arizona. Annie Johnson removes the bullet and offers Kimble work as a teacher. The local sheriff, Prycer, believes that Kimble has escaped, but his deputy, Steel, believes him to still be in the area and suspects Annie of sheltering the fugitive. Guest Stars: Hope Lange as Annie Johnson, Mark Richman as Deputy Steel, Jaime Sanchez as Sam, Arch Johnson as Sheriff Prycer, John McLiam as Deputy Kelton, Lew Brown as Deputy O'Hara, and Vincent Arias as Roger.
92	2	"Death is the Door Prize"	Don Medford	Oliver Crawford	Ed Sanders Los Angeles, California	September 20, 1966	4753
Kimble believes he sees the one-armed man entering an audiovisual trade show at a courtyard-style hotel (filmed on Wilshire Boulevard in Los Angeles, with many, many landmarks making the location obvious). After Kimble runs into a guest and accidentally takes her wallet, on-site security mistakes him for a pickpocket and gives chase. To complicate things, Kimble's visit was caught, for an instant, on videotape, by a saleswoman demonstrating new home-recording technology. Even worse, Kimble was a witness to a burglary that ended in a fatal shooting. An ex-cop now desperately needs Kimble to testify at the inquest to prove that he fired in self-defense — and he will stop at nothing to bring Kimble in. Guest Stars: Howard Da Silva as Pete Dawes, Ossie Davis as Johnny Gaines, Lois Nettleton as Marcia Stone, Bill Erwin as an extra.
93	3	"A Clean and Quiet Town"	Mark Rydell	Howard Browne	Paul Miller Clark City, Kentucky	September 27, 1966	4754
Kimble believes he spotted the one-armed man while in Clark City, a corrupt gambling town. In fact he did: the one-armed man works there as a numbers runner under the alias Steve Cramer, and hires two cops to attack Kimble. Kimble survives but "Cramer" puts out a contract on him. Kimble is nursed back to health by Cora, a prostitute who initially attempted to steal his wallet. She tells Kimble that the entire town is under the control of mob underboss Oliver Enright, to whom Kimble goes to ask for protection. Eventually, Kimble and the one-armed man are both brought to the elderly and invalid Mafia boss Victor Luchek, who must decide what to do with the two fugitives in his town. Guest Stars: Michael Strong as Oliver Enright, Carol Rossen as Cora, Eduardo Ciannelli as Victor Luchek. • Bill Raisch appears in this episode.
94	4	"The Sharp Edge of Chivalry"	Gerald Mayer	Sam Ross	Carl Baker A large, midwestern city	October 4, 1966	4757
Kimble is working as an apartment janitor in a downtown metropolitan city. Roger Roland, a neighbor, murders a woman in Kimble's building by bludgeoning her to death with a marble statue after she refuses his advances. After a tenant reports seeing a figure run from the murder victim's apartment, the police arrive and suspect Kimble despite his alibi. Meanwhile, Gerard arrives to resume his personal search for Kimble. The city in which the story takes place is never identified (aside from not being in Ohio), but it must be close enough to Stafford that Gerard can get there in only a few hours. Guest Stars: Robert Drivas as Roger Roland, Eduard Franz as Edward Roland, Madlyn Rhue as Liz Roland, Richard Anderson as Lieutenant Sloan, Rosemary Murphy as Mrs. Turney, Ellen Corby as Mrs. Murdock, and Judee Morton as Millie Brand. • Barry Morse appears in this episode.
95	5	"Ten Thousand Pieces of Silver"	James Neilson	T : Wilton Schiller; S/T : E. Arthur Kean	Dave Livingston Monroe County, Pennsylvania	October 11, 1966	4759
Kimble finds work on Jake Lawrence's farm where he develops a special friendship with Jake's autistic daughter, Cathy. Kimble becomes nervous when a sheriff, Mel Bailey, begins searching for Joe Burmas, a convicted murderer who escaped from prison a few weeks before. Meanwhile, back in Stafford, Gerard is confronting the editor of the local newspaper who self-servingly has established a $10,000 reward for Kimble's capture—and Gerard later learns that someone has responded. Gerard arrives at Jake's farm, where Burmas shows up and takes Cathy hostage, leaving Kimble having to rescue Cathy and escape from Gerard at the same time. Guest Stars: June Harding as Cathy Lawrence, Lin McCarthy as Jake Lawrence, Bonnie Beecher as Ella Lawrence, Joe Maross as Sheriff Mel Bailey, Paul Mantee as Burmas, Simon Scott as Martin Pierce. • Barry Morse appears in this episode.
96	6	"Joshua's Kingdom"	Gerd Oswald	Lee Loeb	Jim Corman Diablo County, Utah	October 18, 1966	4756
While working as a veterinarian assistant in rural Utah, Kimble becomes acquainted with Ruth Simmons, an unwed teenage mother with a sickly infant. She is being harassed by a would-be deputy, Pete Edwards. Her father, Joshua, has his own interpretation of religion which prohibits the use of medicine for any human ailment, but he is also driven by bitterness that his daughter's out-of-wedlock birth has shamed him. Kimble brings antibiotics, but Joshua destroys the drugs. After determining that the baby is anemic, Kimble secretly arranges for a blood transfusion. He learns Ruth was to marry a soldier who died in a bus accident. Joshua holds Kimble at gunpoint, but when the baby loses consciousness, Kimble revives him. Joshua, shamed by his attitude, must act when Edwards arrives to arrest Kimble with the aid of two bloodhound dogs. Guest Stars: Kim Darby as Ruth Simmons, Tom Skerritt as Pete Edwards, Harry Townes as Joshua Simmons.
97	7	"Second Sight"	Robert Douglas	Daniel B. Ullman	Jack Anderson Pittsburgh, Pennsylvania	October 25, 1966	4752
Now employed by a film supply store as a photo developer, Kimble spots the one-armed man in a photo. Kimble tracks down the freelance photographer who took the picture, Howie Keever, and learns that the one-armed man (now going by "Joe Walters") works at a nearby chemical warehouse. Kimble goes there to surprise "Walters". During a scuffle, the one-armed man accidentally ignites some chemicals, creating an explosion which leaves him injured and Kimble blinded by the flash. The one-armed man manages to escape and once again reports Kimble to the police. Kimble must find a way back to Howie's apartment for safety, but Howie and his uncle learn about the $10,000 reward on Kimble and call the police. Guest Stars: Tim Considine as Howie Keever, Ned Glass as Albert, Ted Knight as Dr. Rains. • Bill Raisch appears in this episode.
98	8	"Wine Is a Traitor"	Gerd Oswald	Howard Dimsdale	Taylor Grandee, California	November 1, 1966	4760
Carl Crandall is the wealthy and spoiled son of California winery owner Pete Crandall. Carl stops a labor strike by killing the union leader and framing Morales, another worker. Kimble happens by and witnesses Carl run from the scene of the crime, but he is unable to tell anyone. Kimble tries to write an anonymous letter to the District Attorney, but Carl's goons confiscate the letter. While Kimble tries to persuade Morales' daughter, Elena, to help him report Carl to clear her father, Pete suspects Carl of the murder. He sends his two right-hand men to keep an eye on Carl, but the men side with Carl, who orders them to murder Kimble. Guest Stars: Roy Thinnes as Carl Crandall, James Gregory as Pete Crandall, Pilar Seurat as Elena Morales.
99	9	"Approach with Care"	William Hale	Lee Loeb	Pete Allen Londale, New Mexico	November 15, 1966	4761
Kimble meets Willie Turner, an intellectually disabled young man who is accused of hurting a child. Kimble reluctantly hides Willie at a carnival where Kimble currently works. Kimble tries to persuade Willie to return to the hospital where his sister had him committed, but when the police discover Kimble, he is forced to run and Willie decides to tag along with him. Guest Stars: Dabney Coleman as Steve Edwards, Michael Conrad as Hogan, Collin Wilcox as Mary Turner, Denny Miller as Willie Turner.
100	10	"Nobody Loses All the Time"	Lawrence Dobkin	E. Arthur Kean	Dr. Harry Robertson Somewhere in Ohio	November 22, 1966	4758
After Richard Kimble spots Fred Johnson at the scene of a fire, he gives chase, but stops to help a woman who has been hit by a vehicle. After Kimble helps her get to a hospital, he discovers that she is Johnson's girlfriend. Meanwhile, Johnson has contacted her and told her to contact the police. Guest Stars: Joanna Moore as Ruth Bianchi, Phillip E. Pine as Lt. Rowan, Barbara Baxley as Maggie Tibbett. • Barry Morse and Bill Raisch appear in this episode.
101	11	"Right in the Middle of the Season"	Christian Nyby	Sam Ross	Eddie Carter A fishing island off the Southern California coast	November 29, 1966	4763
While working as a fishing crewman, Kimble becomes embroiled in a union strike organized by Joe Donovan, the son of Kimble's employer, Tony Donovan. During a rally, Kimble, Tony and a few others are arrested. After being released, Kimble tries to leave town before his secret will be revealed. Tony offers to take Kimble to Mexico if the fugitive helps him on his next fishing trip—but Joe sees Tony smuggle Kimble aboard their boat and calls the police. Guest Stars: James Callahan as Joe Donovan, Dean Jagger as Tony Donovan.
102	12	"The Devil's Disciples"	Jud Taylor	S : Robert Dillon; T : Jeri Emmett; S/T : Steven W. Carabatsos	N/A An area near Twin Forks Junction, in the American Southwest	December 6, 1966	4762
While fleeing from a sheriff's dragnet, Kimble is rescued by a dangerous motorcycle gang called the Devil's Disciples, led by the brutal leader Hutch. As payback, Hutch wants Kimble's help in avenging the death of a former gang member who robbed a gas station. His father had turned him in, and as part of his sentence, he was drafted and sent to Vietnam, where he was killed in action. When Kimble notices that the gang is not completely unified, he seeks help from Don and girlfriend Patty to help him escape so he can warn the police to prevent the killing of the deceased gang member's father. Guest Stars: Bruce Dern as Hutch, Lou Antonio as Don, Diana Hyland as Patty.
103	13	"The Blessings of Liberty"	Joseph Pevney	Daniel B. Ullman	Ben Russell San Pedro, Los Angeles, California	December 20, 1966	4755
Kimble finds work at an upholstery store, which the police are staking out in their search for Bowen, an escaped killer. Kimble becomes acquainted with one worker, a Hungarian immigrant named Josef Karac, who is actually a doctor wanted by the police for an abortion authorities believe he performed years earlier. The police come to Karac's apartment where his wife, daughter, and nephew live, while police officer Jim Macklin goes undercover as a worker at the shop where Bowen was last seen. Bowen soon returns and takes the Karac family hostage and vows to do anything to escape from the police even if it means killing again. Guest Stars: Tony Musante as Billy Karnes/Bowen, Ludwig Donath as Josef Karac, Noam Pitlik as Jim Macklin.
104	14	"The Evil Men Do"	Jesse Hibbs	Walter Brough	Russell Jordan The Poconos and Pittsburgh, Pennsylvania	December 27, 1966	4767
Richard Kimble works on the ranch of Arthur Brame, unaware that he is a retired Mob hitman. When a horse breaks loose and nearly tramples Brame, Kimble saves his boss' life, and the ranch owner is determined to repay the debt to Kimble. When Brame learns that Lt. Gerard is looking for Kimble, he arranges to steer Gerard into a trap at a warehouse he owns, but Kimble and Brame's wife Sharon race to stop him. Guest Stars: James Daly as Arthur Brame, Elizabeth Allen as Sharon. • Barry Morse appears in this episode.
105	15	"Run the Man Down"	James Sheldon	S : Fred Freiberger; T : Barry Oringer	Tom Anderson In the Strawberry Mountain (Oregon) range, Oregon	January 3, 1967	4764
While escaping from the police hunting him in the wilderness of Oregon, Kimble meets a wounded criminal who demands that he take him to a rendezvous point in an isolated cabin a few miles away. They reach it only to find it occupied by a woman called Laura Craig. They are joined by the criminal's three accomplices the next day. A tense hostage situation develops when the local sheriff also arrives to look for Kimble. Guest Stars: James Broderick as Sheriff Owen Tripp, Ed Asner as Joe Bantam, Georgann Johnson as Laura Craig.
106	16	"The Other Side of the Coin"	Lewis Allen	Sam Ross	Jim Parker Ocean Grove, California	January 10, 1967	4766
Now a clerk in a small grocery in Ocean Grove, California, Kimble witnesses the conflict between a co-worker, Larry Corby, and his father, Ben, who's the town's sheriff. Larry has plans he has not told his father, and their relationship is about to change dramatically. Ben refuses to support Larry and his pregnant girlfriend, so the teenager robs the store where Kimble works, but gets shot by Ben during the getaway. After seeing that he shot his own son, Ben captures Kimble and offers to set him free if Kimble gives the boy medical attention. Guest Stars: Beau Bridges as Larry Corby, John Larch as Ben Corby, Joseph Campanella as Harry Banner.
107	17	"The One That Got Away"	Leo Penn	Philip Saltzman and Harry Kronman	Bill March Southern California, and Tanango, Baja California, Mexico	January 17, 1967	4765
Ralph Schuyler is a government agent who goes undercover as a boat captain to spy on Felice Greer, the wife of an international embezzler hiding out in Mexico. Kimble is on that boat as a hired deck hand. Ralph learns that Kimble's identity is false, then takes Kimble's fingerprints. After an emergency landing, the agent leaves the fingerprints with a local Mexican shopkeeper and notifies the authorities of Felice's whereabouts. Guest Stars: Charles Bronson as Ralph Schuyler, Anne Francis as Felice Greer, Charles Drake as Oliver Greer.
108	18	"Concrete Evidence"	Murray Golden	T : Jeri Emmett; S/T : Jack Turley	Steve Dexter Coleman, Nebraska	January 24, 1967	4769
Alex "Pat" Patton, a conscienceless building contractor, once built a theater in his hometown, but the theater soon collapsed, killing three children and crippling several others. Although exonerated of manslaughter charges, the townspeople have been irate with Patton ever since. Kimble is recognized by Pat from a wanted poster in his office. He privately tells Kimble that he has one month to live because he's dying from a congenital heart condition. Pat wants Kimble to keep him alive long enough to finish the motel he is working on. If Kimble refuses or flees, Pat will turn him in to the authorities. Guest Stars: Celeste Holm as Pearl Saunders, Jack Warden as Alex Patton, Harold Gould as Tom Crailer.
109	19	"The Breaking of the Habit"	John Meredyth Lucas	John Meredyth Lucas	Tom Marlow Sacramento and Tarleton, California	January 31, 1967	4768
After fleeing a police roadblock where he gets shot in the leg, Kimble hops on a truck headed toward Sacramento. He once again meets up with Sister Veronica (from the two-part episode Angels Travel On Lonely Roads), who is now the principal of the St. Mary Magdalene School for girls. Kimble asks the nun to drive him to Tarleton, where the one-armed man supposedly works. Sister Veronica, who is suffering from a brain tumor, learns that a delinquent student has run away and is torn between driving after the girl or staying to help Kimble. Things get more complicated when Marie, a "bad girl" student, sees Kimble and calls the police. Guest Stars: Eileen Heckart as Sister Veronica, Antoinette Bower as Sister Angelica, Heather North as Marie Dormond.
110	20	"There Goes the Ball Game"	Gerald Mayer	Oliver Crawford	Gene Tyler Anaheim, California	February 7, 1967	4770
At a California Angels baseball game, Kimble unwittingly witnesses a man walk away with a woman. Andy Newmark, the woman's father, summons Kimble, claiming the woman is his daughter and she has been kidnapped. Her abductors want a $200,000 ransom. When word leaks out, reporters surround the Newmark household and Kimble is unable to slip away. The kidnappers, a former baseball player and a friend, realize that Kimble witnessed them commit their crimes, and so they plot to have Kimble deliver the ransom money so they can kill him. Guest Stars: Martin Balsam as Andy Newmark, Susan Seaforth Hayes as Vicki Walton, Gabriel Dell as Chester, Lynda Day George as Nadine Newmark.
111	21	"The Ivy Maze"	John Meredyth Lucas	Edward Hume	Jerry Sinclair Wellington, Iowa	February 21, 1967	4771
Fritz Simmons is a college professor doing research on sleep deprivation; he is also a close friend of Kimble as he, Richard, wife-to-be Helen, and Fritz's wife Caroline were college pals. One of his patients is the one-armed man, Fred Johnson, who works as a groundskeeper at Wellington College under the alias Carl Stoker. Fritz contacts Kimble, who verifies that it is indeed Johnson. Fritz arranges for Stoker/Johnson to participate in his dream withdrawal experiments to try and extract a confession from him. Caroline, however, sees Kimble and calls Lt. Gerard, still bitter because as youths Fritz had loved Helen before her. Fritz and Kimble finally draw a recorded confession from Johnson—until Gerard bursts into the experiment and a three-way chase ensues. Guest Stars: William Windom as Fritz Simmons, Geraldine Brooks as Caroline Simmons, and Jill Janssen (David Janssen's sister) as a student. • Barry Morse and Bill Raisch appear in this episode.
112	22	"Goodbye My Love"	Lewis Allen	Lee Loeb	Bill Garrison Southern California	February 28, 1967	4772
Kimble becomes romantically involved with former recording star Gayle Marten, unaware that she knows his secret and the $10,000 reward for his capture. Gayle and her other lover, Alan Bartlett, are plotting to kill Alan's wealthy wife Norma, a former golf pro who now uses a wheelchair, and put the blame on Kimble so they can capture him and collect the reward money, as well as Norma's vast wealth. Guest Stars: Jack Lord as Alan Bartlett, Marlyn Mason as Gayle Marten, Patricia Smith as Norma Bartlett.: This was one of Lord’s final acting appearances before beginning his twelve year run on Hawaii Five-0.
113	23	"Passage to Helena"	Richard Benedict	Barry Oringer	Tom Barrett Wyler City, Montana	March 7, 1967	4773
After being arrested in a small Montana town for a minor loitering charge and resisting arrest, Kimble is put in jail next to a suspect in a race-related killing. The black deputy becomes determined to transport Kimble and the racist murderer to the state capital for arraignment, but they are ambushed by the killer's accomplices and are now forced to travel on foot through hostile territory. Guest Stars: James Farentino as Rafe Carter, Percy Rodriguez as Emery Dalton.
114	24	"The Savage Street"	Gerald Mayer	T : Jeri Emmett; S/T : Mario Alcalde	Tony Maxwell A large city in the Northeast	March 14, 1967	4774
Kimble is working at a cigar-making store owned by Jose Anza and becomes close friends with his son, Jimmy, who is threatened by three bullies. Kimble is shot in the leg after the police discover him, so Jimmy hides him from both his father and his uncle Miguel, a police officer determined to capture the fugitive. Guest Stars: Gilbert Roland as Jose Anza, Michael Ansara as Miguel Anza, Tom Nardini as Jimmy Anza.
115	25	"Death of a Very Small Killer"	John Meredyth Lucas	Barry Oringer	Thomas Barrett Puerta Banales, Central America	March 21, 1967	4775
Fleeing to an unnamed Central American country, Kimble contracts pneumonia. He seeks refuge at a local hospital where he is recognized by Dr. Frederick Howell, an American who is conducting research on meningitis. After Kimble recovers, Dr. Howell blackmails him into assisting with his research in exchange for protection from the local police. While working with Howell's assistant, Reina Morales, Kimble soon discovers that several of the patients are being unwittingly infected and sacrificed for Howell's research purposes. Meanwhile, a persistent police sergeant, Rodriguez, begins investigating Kimble's true identity. Though it is not mentioned which country Kimble is in, it is not Mexico—the country is said to have provinces, not states. Guest Stars: Arthur Hill as Dr. Howell, Carol Lawrence as Reina Morales, Carlos Romero as Sgt. Rodriguez.
116	26	"Dossier on a Diplomat"	Gerald Mayer	T : Jeri Emmett; S/T : J. T. Gallard	Charlie Farrell Washington, D.C.	March 28, 1967	4776
Kimble travels to Washington, D.C. to meet lawyer Frank Hobart, author of a book titled Unjustly Convicted, opining that Kimble was convicted without the benefit of a fair trial due to the media circus influencing the judge and jury. Kimble wants Hobart to represent him while the lawyer tries to persuade the courts to re-open the Kimble murder case. Afterwards, Kimble finds himself tending to Unawa, an African ambassador who suddenly collapses in the street. The grateful ambassador shelters Kimble at his embassy, despite protests from the ambassador's wife, Davala, who learns Kimble's identity. Ambassador Unawa believes in Kimble's innocence, but Davala offers no opinion. She simply believes that Kimble's presence in the embassy—if it were established the ambassador deliberately shielded a convicted criminal from capture—could cause an international incident that would end her husband's career. She contacts Gerard and the local police who surround the building, but cannot enter it due to the embassy being a part of foreign soil. Ambassador Unawa falls into a coma after revealing to Kimble that he is dying from a brain tumor. Davala takes advantage of this to relocate the embassy so the police can move in and arrest Kimble. Guest Stars: Diana Sands as Davala Unawa, Diana Hyland as Alison Priestley, Ivan Dixon as Ambassador Unawa, Lloyd Gough as Frank Hobart. • Barry Morse appears in this episode.
117	27	"The Walls of Night"	John Meredyth Lucas	Lawrence L. Goldman	Stan Dyson Portland, Oregon/Lake Shohalis, Washington	April 4, 1967	4777
Kimble, working as a truck driver out of Portland, Oregon, becomes romantically involved with radio dispatcher Barbara Wells, unaware that she is a convicted embezzler on loan through the state prison's work-release program. Distraught after her parole is denied for another six months, Barbara flees to a small, out-of-the-way resort in the wilds of Washington state where she knows Kimble (who is on the road awaiting a shipment) is staying. She wants to go to Canada with him, but soon enough the authorities are looking for AWOL prisoner Barbara — and for Kimble as well. Guest Stars: Janice Rule as Barbara Wells, Steve Ihnat as Art Meredith, Tige Andrews as Buck Leonard, Sheree North as Willy. • Note – This episode ends with Kimble walking past "Del Floria's Tailor Shop", the entrance to U.N.C.L.E. headquarters on The Man from U.N.C.L.E..
118	28	"The Shattered Silence"	Barry Morse	S : Ralph Goodman; T : Barry Oringer	Ben Lewis Pinedale, Washington	April 11, 1967	4778
In the hills of Washington state, a young sculptor named Andrea hides Kimble from a deputy named Howe. When the lawman finds him, Kimble retreats deeper into the mountain, taking refuge in the home of hermit John Mallory, a former scholar who cut himself off from civilization 14 years earlier, and his only companions who are two vicious German Shepherd dogs. Despite being aware that Kimble is a fugitive, Mallory takes a liking to Kimble and forbids him to leave. Kimble is compelled to help the ailing Mallory as the deputy closes in on their location. Guest Stars: Laurence Naismith as John Mallory, Antoinette Bower as Andrea, Paul Mantee as Deputy Robert Howe, Dabbs Greer as Jensen.
119 120	29 30	"The Judgment"	Don Medford	George Eckstein and Michael Zagor	Frank Davis (Part 1); N/A (Part 2) Tucson, Arizona & Los Angeles, California (Part 1); Stafford, Indiana (Part 2)	August 22, 1967 August 29, 1967	4779 4780
The one-armed man, Fred Johnson, has been arrested in Los Angeles for a minor crime, which Richard Kimble spots in a newspaper story while working as a truck maintenance man in Tucson, Arizona. Gerard tries to use this to lure Kimble out into the open. Arriving in Los Angeles to be sheltered by an old family acquaintance, stenographer Jean Carlisle, Kimble needs to verify that Johnson is the man he is looking for, but someone wires a bail bondsman money to bail Johnson out. Kimble and Jean find the bail bondsman dead, after the bondsman tried to convince Johnson to be part of a blackmail scheme. Kimble goes through documents and is shocked to see who sent the money. He intends to confront this person; at the same time, Kimble and Jean begin to acknowledge feelings for each other. As Kimble prepares to leave, Gerard catches him and takes him into custody. Johnson hops on a train while Kimble and Gerard make their way back home to Stafford, Indiana. Kimble and Gerard are on a train heading to their Indiana hometown, the chase over at last. Kimble reveals that the person who sent Johnson's bail money merely used the name of Leonard Taft, his brother-in-law. Gerard gives Kimble 24 hours to verify the one-armed man in Stafford. Johnson calls the Tafts, demanding that they meet with him; they dismiss it as a crank call, but neighbor and Stafford planning commissioner Lloyd Chandler goes to the meeting. Dr. Kimble and Lt. Gerard find tell-tale evidence of Johnson's presence, and Jean Carlisle arrives at the Tafts reuniting with Richard Kimble. Lloyd Chandler holds the key to unlocking the events of "the day the running stopped" as viewers—by way of Lloyd Chandler unburdening himself to his ailing wife Betsy—are taken back to what really happened on the night when Dr. Kimble's wife Helen was murdered. Betsy Chandler tells Dr. Kimble and Lt. Gerard the story, and they catch up to Johnson at a deserted amusement park, where Lloyd Chandler plans to kill Johnson in order to keep the secret that holds the key. The stage is then set, in the famous amusement park tower scene, for the final confrontation between the Fugitive, Dr. Richard Kimble, and Fred Johnson, the one-armed man who is the real murderer of Helen Kimble. Guest Stars: Diane Baker as Jean Carlisle, Joseph Campanella as Captain Lee (Part 1), Michael Constantine as Arthur Howe (Part 1), Jacqueline Scott as Donna Taft, Richard Anderson as Leonard Taft, J. D. Cannon as Lloyd Chandler (Part 2), Louise Latham as Betsy Chandler (Part 2), Diane Brewster (uncredited) as Helen Kimble (Part 2). • Note – In 1997 TV Guide ranked part 2 number 23 on its "100 Greatest Episodes of All Time" list. In 2009, it moved to #16.
