= Janice Rule =

American actress (1931–2003)

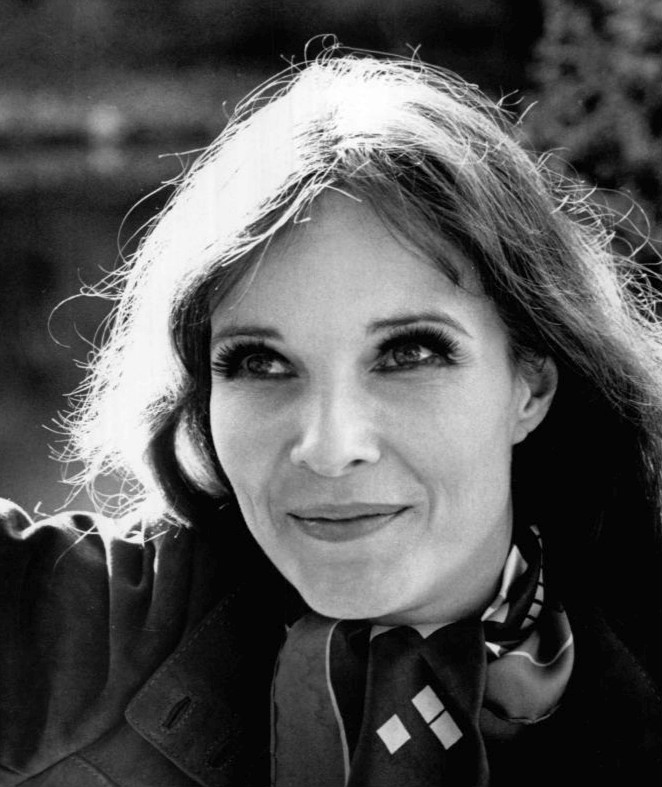
- Press photo from a 1973 guest appearance on the second episode of Barnaby Jones
- Born: Mary Janice Rule; August 15, 1931; Norwood, Ohio, U.S.
- Died: October 17, 2003 (aged 72); New York City, U.S.
- Education: Southern California Psychoanalytic Institute (PhD)
- Occupations: Actress, psychotherapist
- Years active: 1951–2003
- Spouses: N. Richard Nash (m. 1955; div. 1955) Robert Thom (m. 1956; div. 1961) Ben Gazzara (m. 1961; div. 1979)
- Children: 2

Mary Janice Rule (August 15, 1931 – October 17, 2003) was an American actress and psychotherapist. Beginning her career as a dancer, she gained early recognition in the original 1953 Broadway production of William Inge's Picnic.

Rule appeared in over 20 films, including Bell, Book and Candle (1958) with James Stewart, The Swimmer (1968) with Burt Lancaster, and Robert Altman's 3 Women (1977) with Shelley Duvall and Sissy Spacek. Her television work included appearances in The Twilight Zone, Route 66, and The Fugitive.

Rule began studying psychoanalysis in 1973 and received her PhD in 1983, specializing in treating fellow actors. She practiced psychotherapy in New York and Los Angeles and continued to act occasionally until her death in 2003.

== Early life ==
Rule was born in Norwood, Ohio, to parents of Irish origin. Her father was a dealer in industrial diamonds. She began dancing at the Chez Paree nightclub in Chicago at age 15, which paid for ballet lessons, and was a dancer in the 1949 Broadway production of Miss Liberty. Rule also studied acting at the Chicago Professional School.

== Career ==
She was pictured on the cover of Life magazine on January 8, 1951, as being someone to watch in the entertainment industry. Gaining a contract by Warner Bros., her first credited screen role was as Virginia in Goodbye, My Fancy (1951), which featured Joan Crawford in the lead. The established star belittled the younger woman, making Rule's work on the film difficult, although Crawford years later wrote a letter of apology to Rule for treating her badly on this film. (Note: For a summary of various accounts, see Quirk, Lawrence J.; Schoell, William (2002). Joan Crawford: The Essential Biography. Lexington: The University Press of Kentucky. pp. 157–158.) Rule's Warner contract was allowed to lapse after only two films. She was troubled by the attitude toward women's beauty at the studios in the early 1950s: "Because I was afraid of being robbed of my individuality, I fought with the makeup people, the hairdressers, and I didn't understand problems of the publicity department," she was reported as saying in 1957.

Rule was in the original 1953 Broadway cast of William Inge's Picnic (in the role of Madge Owens, the innocent beauty, played by Kim Novak in the film version), whose company also included Paul Newman in his Broadway debut. This commitment led her to turn down the role ultimately played by Eva Marie Saint in On the Waterfront (1954). "I knew I couldn't shoot in a movie all day and work on a stage at night and do my best in both," she was quoted as saying by Hedda Hopper of the Los Angeles Times in 1966. Among her other Broadway shows were The Flowering Peach, The Happiest Girl in the World, and Michael V. Gazzo's Night Circus, a 1958 production which lasted for only a week, but introduced Rule to Ben Gazzara, who became her third husband.

Her other films in the 1950s included A Woman's Devotion (1956), the Western Gun for a Coward (1957) and Bell, Book and Candle (1958), in which she played the fiancée who loses publisher 'Shep' Henderson (James Stewart) to the spell-casting witch Gillian Holroyd (Kim Novak). On television, she appeared in an episode of Checkmate ("The Mask of Vengeance", 1960), where she played Elena Nardos, the roommate of Cloris Leachman's character, Marilyn Parker. She played Helen Foley in The Twilight Zone S1 E29 "Nightmare as a Child" which aired on April 29, 1960. She appeared as different characters in three episodes of Route 66. She acted as both Barbara Webb and Barbara Wells with David Janssen in two episodes of The Fugitive entitled "Wife Killer" and "The Walls of Night". She also had a major role as Nancy Reade in "Three Bells to Perdido", the debut episode of the Richard Boone western Have Gun – Will Travel. Rule also starred, second billing to Yul Brynner, in the western film Invitation to a Gunfighter (1964).

Among her later film roles were Emily Stewart in The Chase (1966), Sheila Sommers in The Ambushers (1967), Burt Lancaster's bitter ex-lover in The Swimmer (1968), Willie in Robert Altman's 3 Women (1977), journalist Kate Newman in Costa Gavras' political thriller Missing (1982), and Kevin Costner's mother in American Flyers (1985).

== Personal life and death ==
Rule had a brief engagement to Farley Granger in 1955. They had appeared in the Broadway play The Carefree Tree in 1955. Next followed a relationship with Ralph Meeker; Meeker had played Hal in Picnic.

Rule was briefly married, during 1955, to television and film writer N. Richard Nash. Her second marriage was to television and film writer Robert Thom in 1956; they had one daughter before divorcing in 1961. Her last marriage was to actor Ben Gazzara in 1961, having one daughter together before their divorce in 1979.

In the 1960s, she became interested in psychoanalysis. She began her formal studies in 1973, specialising in treating her fellow actors, and received her PhD 10 years later from the Southern California Psychoanalytic Institute in Los Angeles. She practiced in New York and Los Angeles, and continued to act occasionally until her death from a cerebral hemorrhage in 2003. She was cremated after her death.

== Partial filmography ==
=== Film ===
Year	Title	Role	Notes
1951	Fourteen Hours	Bit part	Uncredited
1951	Goodbye, My Fancy	Virginia Merrill	
1951	Starlift	Nell Wayne	
1952	Holiday for Sinners	Susan Corvier	
1953	Rogue's March	Jane Wensley	
1956	A Woman's Devotion	Stella Stevenson	
1957	Gun for a Coward	Aud Niven	
1958	Bell, Book and Candle	Merle Kittridge	
1960	The Subterraneans	Roxanne	
1964	Invitation to a Gunfighter	Ruth Adams	
1966	The Chase	Emily Stewart	
1966	Alvarez Kelly	Liz Pickering	
1967	Welcome to Hard Times	Molly Riordan	
1967	The Ambushers	Sheila Sommers	
1968	The Swimmer	Shirley Abbott	
1971	Doctors' Wives	Amy Brennan	
1971	Gumshoe	Mrs. Blankerscoon	
1973	Kid Blue	Janet Conforto	
1977	3 Women	Willie Hart	
1982	Missing	Kate Newman	
1985	American Flyers	Mrs. Sommers	
1985	Rainy Day Friends	Elaine	

=== Television ===
Year	Title	Episode	Role	Notes	Ref.
1954	General Foods 25th Anniversary Show: A Salute to Rodgers and Hammerstein		Jenny Brinker	In "You Are Never Away" from Allegro	
1955	Appointment with Adventure	"Design for Trouble" a.k.a. "Masquerade"		"Girl who helps French dress designer trap men who pirate his designs"	
1957	Schlitz Playhouse of Stars	"The Life You Save"	Lucy Nell Crater		
1957	Playhouse 90	"Four Women in Black"	Sister Martha		
1957	Wagon Train	"The Zeke Thomas Story"	Maggie		
1957	Have Gun – Will Travel	"Three Bells to Perdido"	Nancy	Pilot episode	(Note: Rule appeared in the first or second episode of four long-running television series: Have Gun – Will Travel episode 1; Route 66 episode 2; The Streets of San Francisco episode 2; and, Barnaby Jones episode 2.)
1960	Playhouse 90	"Journey to the Day"	Karen Andrews		
1960	The Twilight Zone	"Nightmare as a Child"	Helen Foley		
1960	Route 66	"A Lance of Straw"	Charlotte Duval		
1961	Route 66	"Once to Every Man"	Prudie Adams		
1963	Dr. Kildare	"Whoever Heard of a Two-Headed Doll?"	Lila Gregg		
1963	Route 66	"But What Do You Do in March?"	Sidney Brookes		
1966	The Fugitive	"Wife Killer"	Barbara Wells		
1967	The Fugitive	"The Walls of Night"	Barbara Webb		
1968	Journey to the Unknown	"Stranger in the Family"	Paula Wilde		
1968	Shadow on the Land		Captain Everett	TV movie	
1969	Trial Run		Lucille Harkness	TV movie	
1971	The Devil and Miss Sarah		Sarah Turner	ABC Movie of the Week	
1972	The Streets of San Francisco	"The First Day of Forever"	Beverly Landau		
1973	Barnaby Jones	"To Catch a Dead Man"	Diane Stewart		
1978	The Word		Barbara Randall	Miniseries	
1986	Spenser: For Hire	"Rockabye Baby"	Mrs. Bennett		
1989	Murder, She Wrote	"Alma Murder"	Margaret Stone		
1992	The Ray Bradbury Theater	"Some Live Like Lazarus"	Anna (age 60)	Final appearance	
