= Slattery's People =

Television series

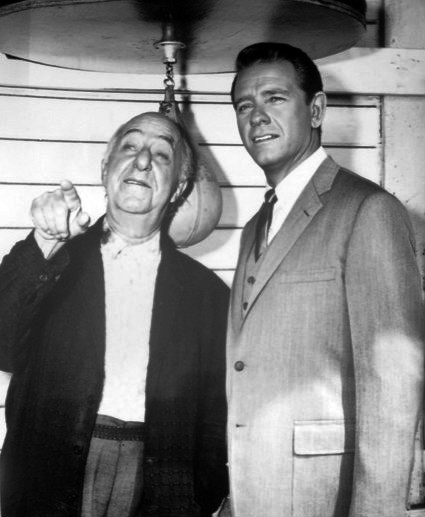
- Crenna with guest star Ed Wynn, 1964.
- Genre: Drama
- Created by: James E. Moser
- Starring: Richard Crenna; Ed Asner; Tol Avery
- Theme music composer: Nathan Scott
- Country of origin: United States
- Original language: English
- No. of seasons: 2
- No. of episodes: 36

Production
- Executive producer: James E. Moser
- Producer: Matthew Rapf
- Production companies: Bing Crosby Productions, in association with Pendick Enterprises and the CBS Television Network (filmed at the studios of Desilu)

Original release
- Network: CBS
- Release: September 21, 1964 – November 26, 1965

Slattery's People is a 1964–65 American television series about local politics starring Richard Crenna as title character James Slattery, a state legislator, co-starring Ed Asner and Tol Avery, and featuring Carroll O'Connor and Warren Oates in a few episodes each. James E. Moser was executive producer. The original name of the show was Lawmaker. The production company was Bing Crosby Productions. The program, telecast on CBS, was nominated for a Golden Globe Award.

Slattery's People is mainly notable for having been one of the few American television series spotlighting the travails of local politicians, a topic that other programs of the period mainly avoided. Episodes opened with this admonition: "Democracy is a very bad form of government. But I ask you never to forget: All the others are so much worse."

Many television critics highly praised the series. Many politicians also approved of the program. U.S. Representative James C. Corman said in a Congressional Record statement on September 30, 1964, “I am pleased that they have taken the high road to show a legislator’s life, and have not pandered to sensationalism or unreality to stimulate an audience following.” This series was a major career change for Crenna. Following more than a decade as a lead actor in two popular network comedies, Our Miss Brooks and The Real McCoys, his role as Jim Slattery opened doors for later guest appearances in several dramatic programs and feature films.

Moser's script for the pilot ("Question: What is truth?") was printed as an appendix in Teleplay; an introduction to television writing by Coles Trapnell.

Television composer Nathan Scott wrote the theme music for Slattery's People.

== Guest stars ==
- Philip Abbott in "Question: What is Honor? What is Death?"
- Joan Blackman as Pat Allison in "Question: Remember the Dark Sins of Youth?"
- Russ Conway in "Question: Bill Bailey, Why Did You Come Home?"
- Don Keefer as George Farnum in "Question: What Did You Do All Day, Mr. Slattery?"
- Joyce Meadows as Gert in the episode "Question: Is Laura the Name of the Game?"
- John M. Pickard as Vance Durant in "Question: How Long Is the Shadow of a Man?"
- Judson Pratt as Harry Daniels in "Question: How Impregnable Is a Magic Tower?"
- Robert F. Simon in "Question: What Did You Do All Day, Mr. Slattery?"
- Joan Tompkins as Dorothy Ralston in "Question: What Time Is the Next Bandwagon?"
- Arthur Hill as Dr. George Allison and Michael Constantine as Paul Hungerford in "Question: Remember the Dark Sins of Youth?"
- Ed Wynn as Ezra Tallicott on "What Ever Happened to Ezra?"
- Tommy Sands in "Question: Why the Lonely, Why the Misbegotten?"
- Ricardo Montalbán (credited as Ricardo Montalban) as Rodriguez in "Question: What Became of the White Tortilla?"
- Claude Akins as Dr. Roy Kirk and Barbara Eden as Lucrezia Kirk in "Question: When Do We Hang the Good Samaritan?"
- Forrest Tucker as Bill Bailey in "Question: Bill Bailey, Why Did You Come Home?"

== Episode list ==
=== Season 1 (1964–65) ===
All episodes in black-and-white

No. overall	No. in season	Title	Directed by	Written by	Original release date
1	1	"Question: What is the Truth?"	Lamont Johnson	James E. Moser	September 21, 1964
2	2	"Question: Why the Lonely, Why the Misbegotten?"	Unknown	Barry Trivers	September 28, 1964
3	3	"Question: Remember the Dark Sins of Youth?"	Robert Gist	Dean Riesner	October 5, 1964
4	4	"Question: Whatever Happened to Ezra?"	Unknown	Unknown	October 12, 1964
5	5	"Question: What Are You Doing Out There, Waldo?"	Unknown	Unknown	October 19, 1964
6	6	"Question: What Became of the White Tortilla?"	Sydney Pollack	Jack Guss & William P. McGivern	October 26, 1964
7	7	"Question: Where Vanished the Tragic Piper? (aka Children of Calamity)"	Lamont Johnson	Anthony Lawrence	November 2, 1964
8	8	"Question: Is Laura the Name of the Game?"	Unknown	Norman Katkov	November 9, 1964
9	9	"Question: What is a Genius Worth This Week?"	Unknown	Jack Guss	November 16, 1964
10	10	"Question: What is Honor, What is Death?"	Unknown	William P. McGivern	November 23, 1964
11	11	"Question: Do the Ignorant Sleep in Pure White Beds? (aka The Fall from Innocence)"	Unknown	Anthony Lawrence	November 30, 1964
12	12	"Question: Which One Has the Privilege?"	Unknown	Norman Katkov	December 7, 1964
13	13	"Question: How Long is the Shadow of a Man?"	Unknown	Bob & Wanda Duncan	January 1, 1965
14	14	"Question: What is a Requiem for a Loser?"	Unknown	Jack Guss	January 8, 1965
15	15	"Question: What Did You Do All Day, Mr. Slattery?"	Unknown	William P. McGivern	January 15, 1965
16	16	"Question: How Do You Fall in Love with a Town?"	Unknown	Unknown	January 22, 1965
17	17	"Question: Does Nero Still at Ringside Sit?"	Unknown	Dean Riesner	February 5, 1965
18	18	"Question: How Do You Catch a Cool Bird of Paradise?"	Mark Rydell	Michael Zagor	February 12, 1965
19	19	"Question: When Do We Hang the Good Samaritan?"	Unknown	Bob & Wanda Duncan	February 19, 1965
20	20	"Question: Is Democracy Too Expensive?"	Robert Gist	S. Lee Pogostin	February 26, 1965
21	21	"Question: Did He Who Made the Lamb Make Thee?"	Richard C. Sarafian	William P. McGivern	March 5, 1965
22	22	"Question: Who You Takin' to the Main Event, Eddie?"	Unknown	Unknown	March 12, 1965
23	23	"Question: What's New in Timbuctoo?"	Unknown	Unknown	March 19, 1965
24	24	"Question: Bill Bailey, Why Did You Come Home?"	Unknown	Stanford Whitmore	April 2, 1965
25	25	"Question: What Time is the Next Bandwagon?"	Unknown	Preston Wood	April 9, 1965
26	26	"Question: What's a Swan Song for a Sparrow?"	Robert Gist	Jack Guss	April 16, 1965

=== Season 2 (1965) ===
All episodes in black-and-white

No. overall	No. in season	Title	Directed by	Written by	Original release date
27	1	"A Sitting Duck Named Slattery"	Unknown	Preston Wood	September 17, 1965
28	2	"He Who Has Ears, Let Him Bug Someone Else"	Unknown	David Rintels	September 24, 1965
29	3	"How Impregnable is a Magic Tower?"	Unknown	Sheldon Stark	October 1, 1965
30	4	"The Unborn"	Unknown	Pat Fielder	October 8, 1965
31	5	"Rally Round Your Own Flag, Mister"	Unknown	David Karp	October 15, 1965
32	6	"What Can You Do with a Wounded Tiger?"	Unknown	Bob & Wanda Duncan	October 22, 1965
33	7	"The Hero"	Unknown	Preston Wood	November 5, 1965
34	8	"Of Damon, Pythias and Sleeping Dogs"	Unknown	Unknown	November 12, 1965
35	9	"The Last Commuter"	Marc Daniels	David Karp	November 19, 1965
36	10	"Color Him Red"	Unknown	Pat Fielder	November 26, 1965
