= Michael Zagor =

American television writer

- Born: Michael S. Zagor
- Occupation: Television writer
- Years active: 1963–1998

Michael S. Zagor is an American television writer. He wrote for television programs including Ben Casey, Room 222, Slattery's People, I Spy, The Long, Hot Summer, GE True, The Bill Cosby Show and The Young Lawyers.

In addition to his writing credits, he and George Eckstein co-wrote the two-part series finale "The Judgment" of the ABC crime drama television series The Fugitive.
