= John Kneubuhl =

American screenwriter (1920–1992)

John Alexander Kneubuhl
- Born: 2 July 1920; Fagatogo, Pago Pago, American Samoa (Note: Born in Fagatogo according to his own declaration: other sources say born and raised in Leone.)
- Died: 20 February 1992 (aged 71); Pago Pago, American Samoa
- Occupations: Writer and dramatist

John Alexander Kneubuhl (July 2, 1920 – February 20, 1992) was an American Samoan screenwriter, playwright and Polynesian historian. He wrote for American television series such as The Fugitive, Gunsmoke, The Wild Wild West, Star Trek, The Invaders and Hawaii Five-O. The son of a Samoan mother and an American father, Kneubuhl's multicultural heritage produced a distinctive artistic vision that formed the basis of his most powerful dramatic work.

An accomplished playwright, Kneubuhl "was a bicultural Polynesian who used the medium of theater to explore identity, loneliness and the craft required to bring them to the stage".

== Biography ==
John Alexander Kneubuhl was born in Fagatogo, Pago Pago or the village of Leone, in American Samoa on July 2, 1920.

John Kneubuhl is the uncle of Samoan Hawaiian writer Victoria Nalani Kneubuhl and Lemanatele Mark Kneubuhl who lives in American Samoa.

=== Childhood to war ===
Raised in Leone until his early teens, Kneubuhl was known as 'Sione Nupo' to his countrymen. His mother, Atalina Pritchard from Apia, was educated in New Zealand, and was a talented pianist, singer and painter. His father Benjamin F. Kneubuhl was a navy surveyor from Iowa who settled in Samoa, and later became a successful businessman.

At the age of 13, John Kneubuhl was sent off to enter Punahou School, Hawaii. He later studied under Thornton Wilder at Yale.

He married "Dotsy" (Dorothy Schenk) in 1942, and soon after entered the U.S. Navy Japanese Language School at the University of Colorado, Boulder. When George H. Kerr was tasked to organize the second research unit of intelligence officers in 1944, aimed to gather information for compiling the Civil Affairs Handbook for Taiwan (Formosa), Kneubuhl was one of the officers recruited into this unit.

=== Career ===
Returning to Hawaii in the mid-1940s, Kneubuhl won acclaim as a playwright with the Honolulu Community Theater, staging a play spoken in Hawaiian Pidgin English (The City is Haunted, 1947). Kneubuhl was also part of the theater's 1948 version of Harry Brown's A Sound of Hunting adapted to include the heroic role played by the 442nd Infantry Regiment of enlisted nisei, received with great fervor by the Japanese-American community. He was both screenwriter and director of the film Damien (1959), a biography of Father Damien that was based on his own play.

He then moved on to Los Angeles to write for television. In 1965, inspired by a magazine article on Michael Dunn, Kneubuhl created the arch-villain Dr. Miguelito Loveless for the series The Wild Wild West. The character became an immediate hit and Dunn appeared in ten episodes over four seasons. Kneubuhl wrote five of them.

By at least 1969 he was back in Samoa, living in Taputimu, mentoring, lecturing on Polynesian history and culture and writing plays, including the trilogy Think of a Garden: and other plays published by University of Hawaii Press. The other plays in the published trilogy were Mele Kanikau: A Pageant and the comedy A Play: A Play.

Kneubuhl died in Pago Pago, American Samoa, on February 20, 1992, the day before the first Samoan reading of his play "Think of a Garden" by his drama and writing group.

In 2022, Kneubuhl was featured in Naomi Hirahara's anthology We Are Here: 30 Inspiring Asian Americans and Pacific Islanders Who Have Shaped the United States that was published by the Smithsonian Institution and Running Press Kids.

== Playwright ==
Kneubuhl's plays explore his Samoan heritage, culture and identity. In 1946, Kneubuhl wrote the play The Harp in the Willows based on the life of Lorenzo Lyons and This City Is Haunted (1947). He also wrote Mele Kanikau: A Pageant and the comedy A Play: A Play.

Think of a Garden, the last play Kneubuhl wrote before his death in 1992, has been called 'the most Samoan of Kneubuhl's plays', it is a look at the writer's bicultural upbringing that artfully weaves together family memory, history, and mysticism.

=== Think of a Garden notes ===
Think of a Garden opens in American Samoa in 1929 during the tumultuous colonial era of Samoa's struggle for political independence during the non-violent Mau movement. The play centres around the Kreber family; a matriarchal Samoan wife Luisa, her American husband Frank, and their only son David. Events unfold to a dramatic climax with the shooting in Apia of Samoa's leader, Tupua Tamasese Lealofi III, a distant relative of Luisa, by the New Zealand constabulary. The play is partly autobiographical. Kneubuhl's play is a devastating critique of the New Zealand administration's mismanagement of Samoa during these events.

The Samoan view of family, deference for the dead, behavior in times of mourning, even concepts of time - all are deftly etched beside the story of Samoa's early move toward independence. The effect is a story as textured as a fine mat.

Think of a Garden premiered at Auckland's Watershed Theatre in February 1993. John had died a year earlier, the day before the play's first reading in Pago Pago by his writing and drama group. The Auckland premier was directed by Nathaniel Lees and produced by Ann Andrews. The cast included Lani Tupu as The Writer, Jay Laga'aia as Lilo, Martyn Sanderson as the Brother Patrick and John Callen as Frank. It was staged in Taki Rua Theatre, Wellington in 1995. At the Chapman Tripp Theatre Awards 1995 in Wellington, the 'Oscars' of New Zealand theatre, Think of a Garden won Production of the Year, Director of the Year, Taki Rua Production of the Year and Female in a Supporting Role award to Sima Urale who played the role of Luisa. The cast included acclaimed New Zealand actor Martyn Sanderson, the director of the film Flying Fox in a Freedom Tree based on the novel by Samoan writer Albert Wendt.

It was staged in 2018 in the garden of Nathan Homestead in Manurewa directed by Anapela Polata'ivao and featuring Stacey Leilua who saw the premier when she was 11.

== Filmography ==
=== Films ===
Year	Film	Credit	Notes
1956	Hart of Honolulu	Screenplay By	Based on a Story by Louis L'Amour
1958	The Screaming Skull	Screenplay By, Produced By	Based on the short story by Francis Marion Crawford
1958	The True Story of Lynn Stuart	Written By	
1959	Doctor Mike	Written By	
1965	Two on a Guillotine	Screenplay By	Co-Wrote screenplay with Henry Slesar
1968	The Sunshine Patriot	Screenplay By	Television Movie, Co-Wrote screenplay with Gustave Field and Joel Rogosin

=== Television ===
Year	TV Series	Credit	Notes
1953	Your Favorite Story	Writer	1 Episode
1954	Rheingold Theater	Writer	1 Episode
1955	TV Reader's Digest	Writer	1 Episode
1955	Fireside Theatre	Writer	2 Episodes
1955	Waterfront	Writer	5 Episodes
1955-56	Climax!	Writer	3 Episodes
1955-56	Medic	Writer	10 Episodes
1956	Front Row Center	Writer	2 Episodes
1956	General Electric Theater	Writer	1 Episode
1956-57	West Point	Writer	4 Episodes
1957	Harbor Command	Writer	1 Episode
1957-58	Suspicion	Writer	2 Episodes
1958	Studio 57	Writer	2 Episodes
1958	Schlitz Playhouse of Stars	Writer	2 Episodes
1958	Target	Writer	1 Episode
1958	Flight	Writer	1 Episode
1958	Lux Playhouse	Writer	1 Episode
1958-62	Have Gun – Will Travel	Writer	2 Episodes
1959	Behind Closed Doors	Writer	1 Episode
1959-60	Markham	Writer	5 Episodes
1959-61	Adventures In Paradise	Writer	6 Episodes
1960	Checkmate	Writer	1 Episode
1960-62	Thriller	Writer	5 Episodes
1961	Dr. Kildare	Writer	1 Episode
1961-62	Alcoa Premiere	Writer	2 Episodes
1962	The Beachcomber	Writer	1 Episode
1962-63	Kraft Mystery Theater	Writer	2 Episodes
1962-65	Wagon Train	Writer	5 Episodes
1963	GE True	Writer	5 Episodes
1963-64	Gunsmoke	Writer	2 Episodes
1964	Ben Casey	Writer	1 Episode
1965-67	The Wild Wild West	Writer	8 Episodes
1966	Felony Squad	Writer	1 Episode
1966	The Fugitive	Writer	5 Episodes
1967	The Invaders	Writer	2 Episodes
1967	Iron Horse	Writer	1 Episode
1968	Hawaii Five-O	Writer	1 Episode
1968	Star Trek	Writer	1 Episode (Uncredited)
1969	The Virginian	Writer	1 Episode
1970	Ironside	Writer	1 Episode
1970	Mannix	Writer	1 Episode
