= Carol Rossen =

American actress (born 1937)

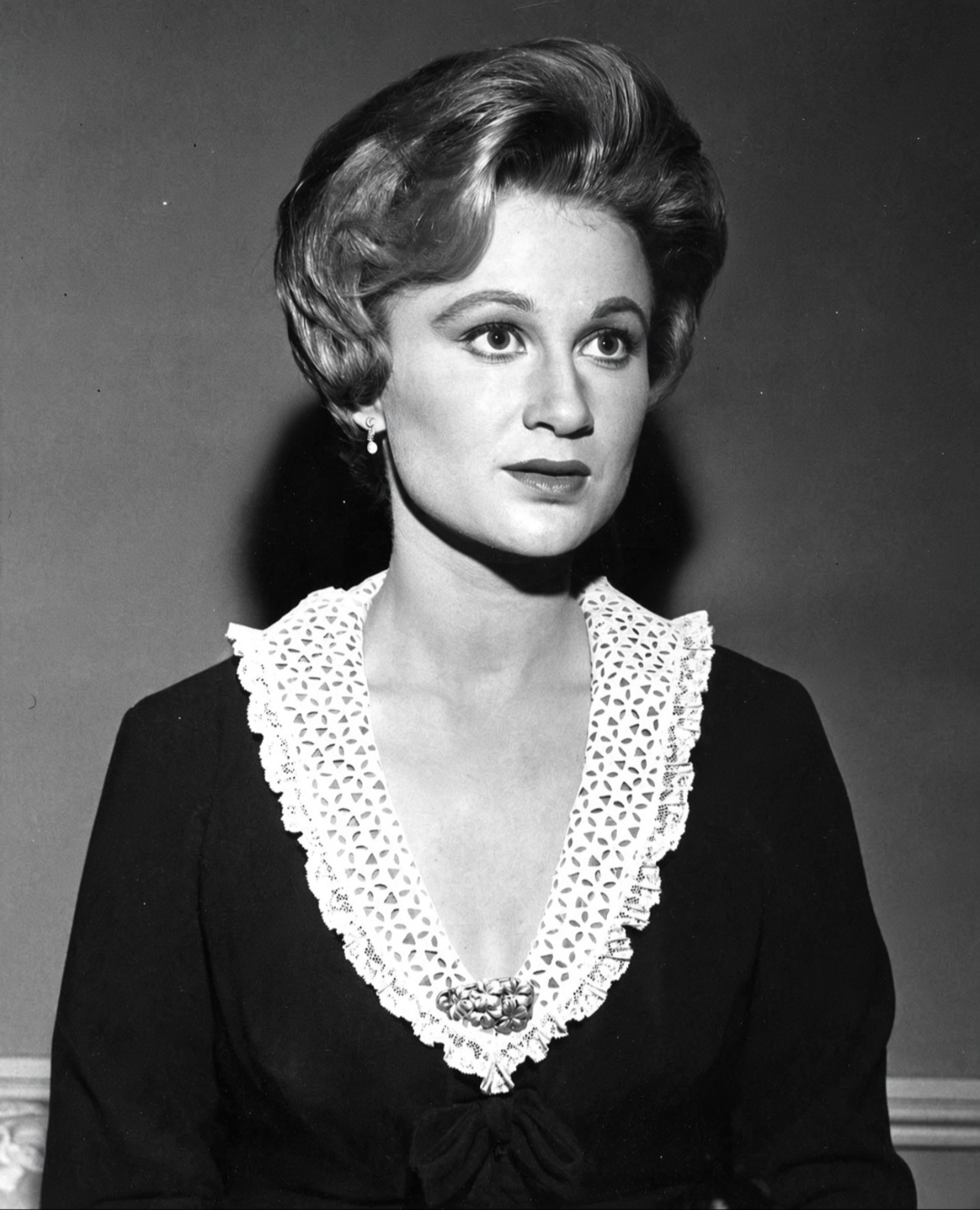
- Rossen in Dr. Kildare, 1961
- Born: Carol Eve Rossen; August 12, 1937 (age 89); Los Angeles, California, U.S.
- Education: Sarah Lawrence College
- Occupation: Actress
- Years active: 1960–1990
- Spouse: Hal Holbrook (m. 1966; div. 1983)
- Children: 1
- Father: Robert Rossen

Carol Eve Rossen (born August 12, 1937) is an American actress.

== Early years ==
Born in Los Angeles, California, Rossen is the oldest of three children of director and producer Robert Rossen. The family lived in California until she was 12 years old. She said, "I had a very normal childhood. I was never surrounded by the children of show business." Then they moved to the eastern United States, living in Connecticut and New York. Accusations made against her father during the Hollywood blacklisting years led to the family's living in Paris. She studied at the American Academy in Rome.

Rossen graduated from Sarah Lawrence College in 1959 with a major in English literature and a minor in political science. As president of the senior class, she spoke at her commencement ceremony. Bessie Schonberg, head of Sarah Lawrence's theater department, urged Rossen to try acting. Schonberg's efforts included spending three years trying to get Rossen to take a worshop course. "When I finally did," Rossen said, "I loved it." She went beyond acting to write and direct shows that were performed on campus for children from the area around the college.

== Career ==
After she finished college, Rossen acted in summer stock theatre at Saranac Lake, New York. She began acting on television in 1960, with her work including a recurring role on The Lawless Years. Other programs on which she appeared included The Heidi Chronicles, Branded, CBS Playhouse, The Untouchables, Dr. Kildare. Harry O, Perry Mason , and The Fugitive. She acted in pilots for the potential TV programs: The Cliff Dwellers (1966), Corey: For the People (1977), The Oath (1976), and Scene of the Crime V (1985).

Rossen's Broadway credits include Nobody Loves an Albatross (1963) and The Glass Menagerie (1965). She also acted at the Forum Lab Theatre. Her other work on stage included an off-Broadway production of Square in the Eye and a play with John Houseman's Theater Group. She appeared in the film The Fury (1978).

=== Critical response ===
A review in The New York Times said that she gave a strong performance in a "Shadow Game", a 1969 episode of CBS Playhouse. Another Times review included Rossen's work in the television movie A Question of Honor (1982) among the program's "impressive performances". Time magazine called an episode of East Side West Side in which she starred "this series' best episode".

=== Hiatus and return ===
Rossen left show business when her daughter was born. When she sought to return to the profession seven years later, she found it difficult. She said, "Allowing myself to become known as merely Mrs. Hal Holbrook was the worst thing I could have done professionally." She tried to make people think she was active during that span "by telling New York friends I had assignments in Los Angeles, and telling people in Los Angeles that I had projects going in New York". Holbrook encouraged her to get back into acting, and she began with a role in a small theatrical production in Los Angeles.

== Books ==
In 1988, Dutton Books published Rossen's non-fiction book, Counterpunch: A Woman's Journey from the Terror of Violence through Rage to Survival (ISBN 978-0-525-24635-0). In it, she recounted her memories of being attacked while jogging on February 14, 1984, when a sledge-hammer-wielding attacker left her for dead in Will Rogers State Park. The book also related her strides in recovering both physically and emotionally. Her 2019 book, Mother Goose Drank Scotch, is a biography of her father.

=== Critical response ===
A review of Counterpunch in The Desert Sun said that the attack on Rossen was "dreadful" and that the book "tells a story that should be told, and certainly Carol Rossen is the person to tell it." The review said that the book would have had more effect if Rossen had used a simpler, more direct writing style. but "Still, Counterpunch deserves to be read."

== Personal life ==
Rossen married Holbrook on December 28, 1966, in New York City. They had a daughter, and they remained wed until 1983.
