= William D. Gordon (actor) =

American actor, writer, director, story editor, and producer (1918–1991)

- Born: William Douglas Gordon; January 4, 1918; Santa Clara, California, U.S.
- Died: August 12, 1991 (aged 73); Thousand Oaks, California, U.S.
- Occupation: Actor
- Years active: 1936–1982

William Douglas Gordon (January 4, 1918 – August 12, 1991) was an American actor, writer, director, story editor, and producer. Although he is best known for his writing credits, he acted occasionally on numerous TV series.

== Biography ==
Gordon was born in Santa Clara, California, in 1918. He started his career as a writer in 1936, writing for radio shows like The Cisco Kid, The Count of Monte Cristo and The Tommy Dorsey Show. In 1939, he began to direct TV shows, directing the first live television shows for the Don Lee Network and later he served as an infantry officer during World War II. In 1958, he acted for the first time in Maverick, appearing subsequently in TV series including Maverick, The Twilight Zone, Thriller, Peter Gunn, Law of the Plainsman, Riverboat, Rawhide, The Americans and The Virginian during the 1960s. He also worked as a script writer for shows like Alfred Hitchcock Presents, The Fugitive, Bonanza, Ironside and Barbary Coast, in addition to writing the screenplay of the films Cotter and Sergeant Ryker.

As a director, he directed one episode of The Richard Boone Show titled "Death Before Dishonor" and another of The Fugitive titled "A.P.B.". On March 31, 1965, he became the producer of Twelve O'Clock High, producing 47 episodes of the series, in addition to producing 32 episodes of The Fugitive between 1964 and 1966. He worked as a story supervisor of The Richard Boone Show, Bonanza, Thriller and Alfred Hitchcock Presents and directed the television game show Queen for a Day. From 1977 to 1982, Gordon, along with James Doherty, helped to produce, write and edit the TV series CHiPs. After retirement, Gordon began writing novels about the Civil War.

== Death ==
Gordon died in Thousand Oaks, California of lung cancer aged 73.

== Selected filmography ==
=== Actor ===
- Cimarron City - The Blood Line (1958) TV Episode .... Roy Rankin
- Maverick - Escape to Tampico (1958) TV Episode .... Sam Garth - Prey of the Cat (1958) TV Episode .... Fred Bender - Two Tickets to Ten Strike (1959) TV Episode .... Eddie Burke
- Peter Gunn - The Portrait (1959) TV Episode .... Maddox
- Law of the Plainsman - Prairie Incident (1959) TV Episode .... Deke - A Matter of Life and Death (1959) TV Episode .... Henchman
- Riverboat - Payment in Full (1959) TV Episode .... Joe Travis - The Barrier (1959) TV Episode .... Joe Travis - About Roger Mowbray (1959) TV Episode .... Joe Travis - A Race to Cincinnati (1959) TV Episode .... Joe Travis - The Unwilling (1959) TV Episode .... Joe Travis - The Fight Back (1959) TV Episode .... Joe Travis - Escape to Memphis (1959) TV Episode .... Joe Travis - Witness No Evil (1959) TV Episode .... Joe Travis - A Night at Trapper's Landing (1959) TV Episode .... Joe Travis - The Faithless (1959) TV Episode .... Joe Travis - The Boy from Pittsburgh (1959) TV Episode .... Joe Travis - Strange Request (1959) TV Episode .... Joe Travis - Guns for Empire (1959) TV Episode .... Joe Travis - The Face of Courage (1959) TV Episode .... Joe Travis
- Black Saddle - A Case of Slow (1960) TV Episode .... Dr. Tom Wall
- Rawhide - Incident of the Last Chance (1960) TV Episode .... Sid Gorman
- The Twilight Zone - Nervous Man in a Four Dollar Room .... George - Eye of the Beholder .... Doctor
- The Americans - Harper's Ferry (1961) TV Episode .... Lt. Barnes - The Regular (1961) TV Episode .... Lt. Barnes
- Thriller - The Premature Burial (1961) TV Episode .... Doctor March
- Laramie - The Star Trail (1959) TV Episode .... Vic Stoddard - A Grave for Cully Brown (1962) TV Episode .... Giles
- The Virginian - West (1962) TV Episode .... Blench
- Bearcats! - Powderkeg (1971) TV Episode .... Fallon, Hotel Goon
- The Bold Ones: The Lawyers - The Strange Secret of Yermo Hill (1971) TV Episode .... Dr. Sinclair
- Alias Smith and Jones - What happened at the XST? (1972) TV Episode .... Reverend Siever
- Captains and the Kings - Chapter III (1976) TV Episode .... Doctor Gill
- Hunter - Blow-Up (1986) TV Episode .... Minister

=== Writer ===
- Startime (1960) TV Series (writer - 1 episode)
- The Americans (1961) TV Series (writer - 2 episodes) (teleplay - 1 episode)
- Thriller (1961–1962) TV Series (adaptation - 2 episodes)
- Outlaws (1961–1962) TV Series (writer - 3 episodes)
- Rodeo (1963) TV Series (writer - 1 episode)
- Alfred Hitchcock Presents (1962–1964) TV Series (teleplay - 6 episodes)
- Kraft Suspense Theatre (1963–1964) TV Series (writer - 1 episode) (teleplay - 4 episodes)
- The Richard Boone Show (1963–1964) TV Series (teleplay - 4 episodes) (writer - 1 episode) (written by - 1 episode)
- Breaking Point (1964) TV Series (written by - 1 episode)
- The Fugitive (1963–1965) TV Series (written by- 3 episodes) (teleplay - 2 episodes)
- 12 O'Clock High (1965–1966) TV Series (writer - 3 episodes)
- Sergeant Ryker (1968) (screenplay)
- The Name of the Game (1969–1970) TV Series (written by - 2 episodes)
- The Bold Ones: The Lawyers (1970–1971) TV Series (teleplay - 2 episodes)
- Alias Smith and Jones (1971–1972) TV Series (writer - 1 episode) (teleplay - 1 episode)
- Bonanza (1972) TV Series (writer - 1 episode)
- Cotter (1973) (writer)
- Petrocelli (1974) TV Series (written by - 1 episode)
- The Six Million Dollar Man (1975) TV Series (story - 1 episode)
- Ironside (1973–1975) TV Series (teleplay - 5 episodes) (written by - 5 episodes) (story - 3 episodes)
- Barbary Coast (1975–1976) TV Series (writer - 1 episode) (written by - 1 episode)
- Chips (1978–1981) TV Series (writer - 4 episodes) (teleplay - 2 episodes) (teleplay & story - 1 episode) (story - 1 episode)

=== Producer ===
- Twelve O'Clock High (1965–1967) TV Series (producer – 47 episodes)
- The Fugitive (1964–1966) TV Series (associate producer – 32 episodes)

=== Miscellaneous crew ===
- The Richard Boone Show (1963–1964) TV Series (story supervisor – 17 episodes)
- Bonanza (1972) TV Series (executive story consultant – 3 episodes)
- Barbary Coast (1975–1976) TV Series (story editor – 11 episodes)
- CHiPs (1978–1982) TV Series (story editor – 77 episodes) (story supervisor – 2 episodes)
