= Bill Raisch =

American dancer, actor, stuntman and acting coach

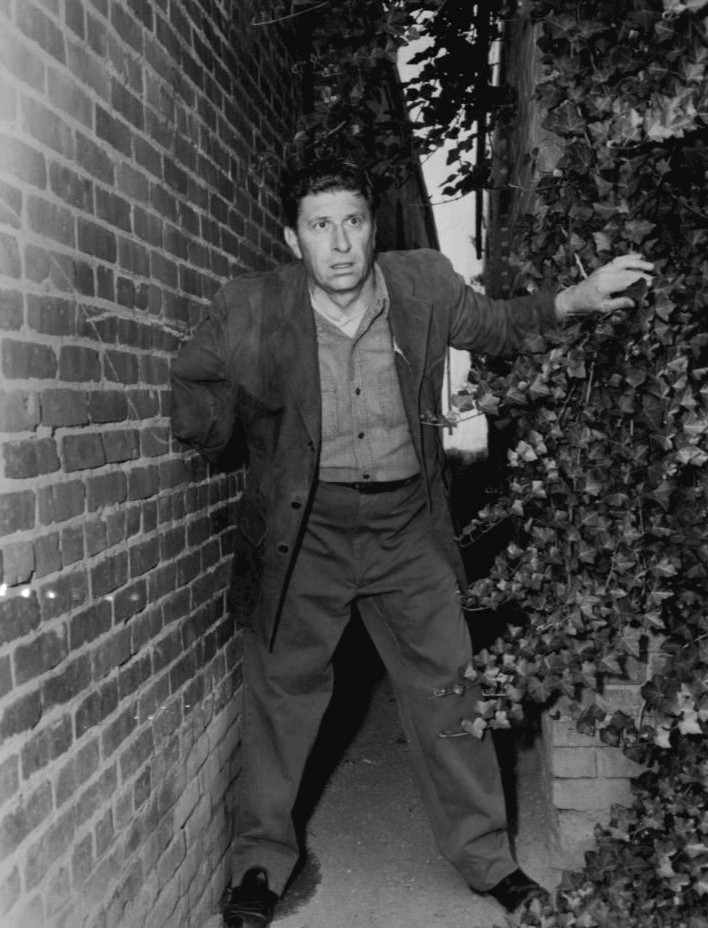
- Raisch as the "One-Armed Man" in The Fugitive
- Born: Carl William Raisch; April 5, 1905; North Bergen, New Jersey, U.S.
- Died: July 31, 1984 (aged 79); Santa Monica, California, U.S.
- Occupations: Dancer; actor; stuntman; acting coach
- Known for: One-armed actor
- Notable work: The Fugitive

Carl William Raisch (April 5, 1905 – July 31, 1984) was an American dancer, actor, stuntman and acting coach. He was best known as the One-Armed Man pursued by Richard Kimble (David Janssen) on the 1963–1967 TV series The Fugitive.

== Early life ==
Carl William Raisch was born on April 5, 1905, in North Bergen, New Jersey. His parents were German immigrants.

After graduating high school, Raisch found a job hauling cement in a construction site. He began lifting weights and also became an amateur boxer. As a dancing partner to a young woman whom he took to socials and dances, he was introduced to Florenz Ziegfeld Jr., who signed him to the Ziegfeld Follies dance troupe. Raisch performed on stage in his first American production at the New Amsterdam Roof Theater in the late 1920s. He primarily performed with the dance troupe in New York, and was also an adagio performer. He married Adele Smith, a fellow Ziegfeld dancer.

== Acting career ==
In the beginning of 1945, during his World War II service with the United States Merchant Marine, Raisch's right arm was badly burned in a shipboard fire and had to be amputated at the elbow. Raisch had acted in a few uncredited film roles before the war, but afterwards pursued a film career, moving to Los Angeles in 1946. Raisch appeared in The War of the Worlds (1953) as "an extra, stand-in, and occasional stuntman", and in Spartacus (1960), playing a character whose arm was hacked off in battle. For the latter stunt, Kirk Douglas as Spartacus chopped off Raisch's prosthetic limb with a sword.

Raisch's first memorable film role was as a one-armed character who initiates a barroom brawl with Douglas's cowboy character in Lonely Are the Brave (1962). The following year, Raisch became the "One-Armed Man"—a shadowy drifter implicated in a brutal murder—in the television series The Fugitive, which ran from 1963 to 1967. Raisch was seen extremely infrequently on the show, making only four fairly brief appearances over the series' first three seasons before becoming more prominent in the fourth and final season, appearing in seven episodes. However, his character was frequently mentioned, and beginning in season 2 "The One-Armed Man" was seen in the opening credits of every episode of The Fugitive, making Raisch's image a well-known pop culture figure. In the series' final episode, Raisch's character was proved to be the true killer of the wife of Dr. Richard Kimble, played by David Janssen. TV Guide named The One-Armed Man No. 5 in their 2013 list of The 60 Nastiest Villains of All Time.

Raisch worked as actor Burt Lancaster's stand-in in several films, although Lancaster was four inches taller than he.

Raisch's disability led to his being typecast, usually as a criminal. He subsequently worked in Los Angeles as an acting coach. He died of lung cancer in a Santa Monica, California, hospital on July 31, 1984, aged 79. His body was cremated and his ashes scattered at sea.

== Filmography ==
Year	Title	Role	Notes
1937	Life Begins in College	Saunders, Lombardy Football Player	Uncredited
1944	The Mark of the Whistler	Truck Driver	Uncredited
1946	From This Day Forward	Man in Employment Office / Bar Patron	Uncredited
1946	Specter of the Rose	Mr. Lemotte	Uncredited
1948	Berlin Express	German	Uncredited
1950	Experiment Alcatraz	Hospital Patient	Uncredited
1952	Hong Kong	Hotel Guest	Uncredited
1952	When in Rome	Prisoner in Italian Jail	Uncredited
1953	Sangaree	Pub Patron	Uncredited
1955	Tight Spot	Courtroom Spectator	Uncredited
1955	How to Be Very, Very Popular		Uncredited
1956	Around the World in 80 Days	Extra	Uncredited
1957	Sweet Smell of Success	Patron at Toots Shor's	Uncredited
1960	Spartacus	Soldier Whose Arm is Hacked Off	Uncredited
1961	The Young Savages	Courtroom Spectator	Uncredited
1962	Alfred Hitchcock Presents	Juror	Season 7 Episode 20: "The Test" (uncredited)
1962	The Alfred Hitchcock Hour	Audience Member	Season 1 Episode 12: "Hangover" (uncredited)
1962	Incident in an Alley	Onlooker at Shooting	Uncredited
1962	Lonely Are the Brave	One Arm	Uncredited
1963	Irma la Douce	Man in Church	Uncredited
1964	Seven Days in May	Minor Role - Scene deleted	Uncredited
1964	The New Interns	Emergency Room Corridor Extra / Restaurant Extra	Uncredited
