= Jack Turley =

American screenwriter (1927–2021)

- Born: Jack Bradford Turley; July 21, 1927; United States
- Died: January 19, 2021 (aged 93)
- Occupation: Screenwriter

Jack Bradford Turley (July 21, 1927 – January 19, 2021) was an American screenwriter. He was nominated for a Daytime Emmy Award in the category Outstanding Drama Series Writing Team for his work on General Hospital. His credits included Gunsmoke, Bonanza, Tales of Wells Fargo, The Fugitive, Rawhide, Hawaii Five-O, O'Hara, U.S. Treasury, The Man from U.N.C.L.E., The Love Boat, Vega$ and 12 O'Clock High.

Turley died in January 2021, at the age of 93.
