= Alexander Singer =

American director (1928–2020)

- Born: April 18, 1928; United States
- Died: December 28, 2020 (aged 92); United States
- Occupations: Film director, television director
- Known for: Star Trek: The Next Generation, Star Trek: Deep Space Nine, Star Trek: Voyager

Alexander Singer (18 April 1928 – 28 December 2020) was an American film and television director. He began his career as assistant director and second camera operator on the short documentary Day of the Fight (1951), the first film directed by his high-school friend Stanley Kubrick. He was associate producer on Kubrick's third feature The Killing (1956). Singer made his debut as a director with the film A Cold Wind in August (1961).

His career was mostly in TV series, although he directed other films, such as the Lee Van Cleef Western Captain Apache (1971), and Glass Houses (1972) with a screenplay written by him and his wife, Judith Singer.

The television series Singer directed include Dr. Kildare, The F.B.I., Mission: Impossible, Alias Smith and Jones, Nakia, Police Woman, Cagney & Lacey, MacGyver, Murder She Wrote, six episodes of The Monkees, and three Star Trek series: The Next Generation, Deep Space Nine, and Voyager.

== Directorial filmography ==
- A Cold Wind in August (1961)
- Psyche 59 (1964)
- Love Has Many Faces (1965)
- Anatomy of a Crime (1969 TV movie)
- Captain Apache (1971)
- Glass Houses (1972)
- The First 36 Hours of Dr. Durant (1975 TV movie)
- Time Travelers (1976 TV movie)
- The Million Dollar Rip-Off (1976 TV movie)
- Bunco (1977 TV movie)
- Hunters of the Reef (1978 TV movie)
- The Return of Marcus Welby, M.D. (1984 TV movie)
