= Lin McCarthy =

American actor

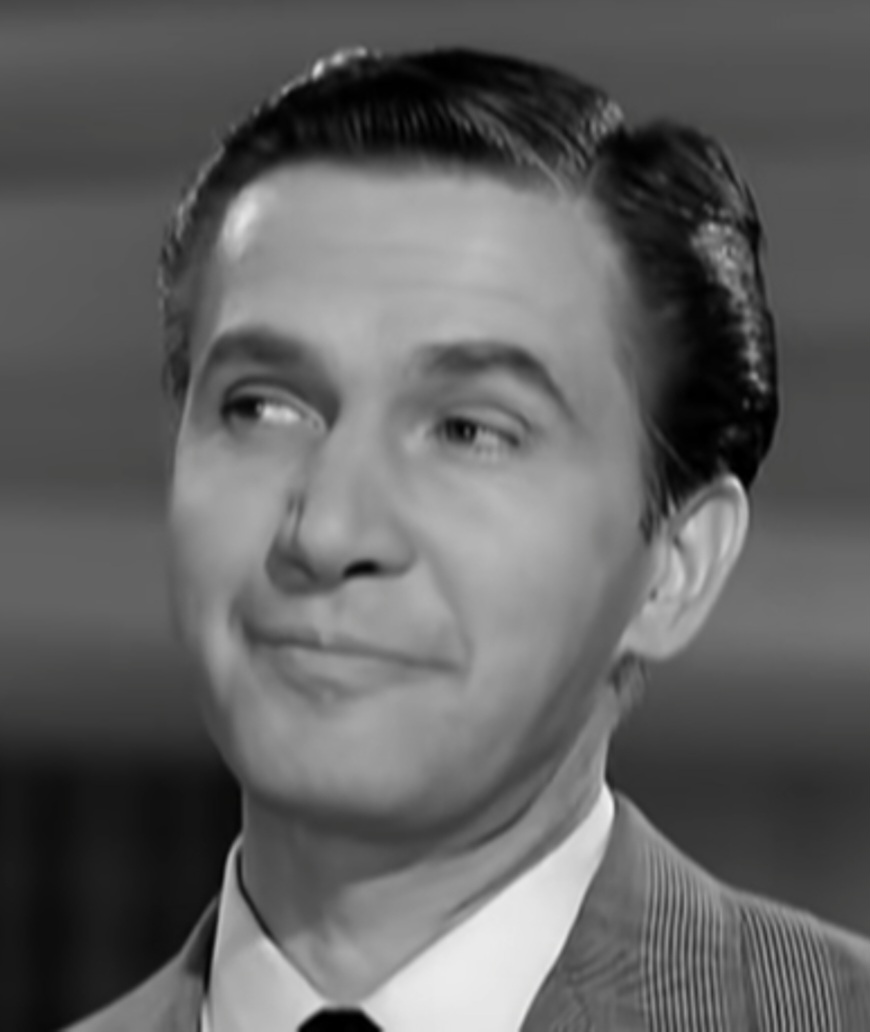
- McCarthy in an episode of One Step Beyond (1959)
- Born: Linwood Winder McCarthy; February 23, 1918; Norfolk, Virginia, U.S.
- Died: November 23, 2002 (aged 84); Beverly Hills, California, U.S.
- Occupation: Actor
- Years active: 1952–1984
- Spouse: Loretta Daye

Linwood Winder McCarthy (February 23, 1918 – November 23, 2002) was an American film, television and theatre actor.

== Early life ==
Born in Norfolk, Virginia, McCarthy served in the military during World War II, and afterwards studied acting at Geller's Theatre Workshop.

== Career ==
He made his stage debut in 1952 in the Broadway play The Chase. McCarthy guest-starred in numerous television programs, including Boris Karloff's Thriller, The Man and the Challenge, Mission: Impossible, The Fugitive, Tales of Wells Fargo, The Rifleman, Gunsmoke, Robert Montgomery Presents, New Comedy Showcase, Wagon Train, Quincy, M.E., 12 O'Clock High, Rawhide, Studio One in Hollywood, Lou Grant, Kraft Television Theatre, The Waltons and The Virginian. He also appeared in films such as Yellowneck, Tail Gunner Joe, The D.I., Face of a Fugitive, The Execution of Private Slovik and The Day After. McCarthy retired in 1984.

== Death ==
McCarthy died on November 23, 2002 of pneumonia in Beverly Hills, California, at the age of 84.
