= George Eckstein =

American writer and television producer

- Born: May 3, 1928; Los Angeles, California, U.S.
- Died: September 12, 2009 (aged 81); Brentwood, Los Angeles, California, U.S.
- Spouses: Ann Morgan Guilbert (m. 1951; div. 1966) Selette Cole (m. 1968)
- Children: 3, including Hallie Todd

George Eckstein (May 3, 1928 – September 12, 2009) was an American writer and television producer whose career spanned three decades, from the early 1960s through the late 1980s. Eckstein was a producer of many popular television programs such as The Invaders and The Name of the Game (Robert Stack segment), in addition to penning the scripts of many others, including Gunsmoke, and Cannon. He and Michael Zagor co-wrote The Fugitive final two part episode, "The Judgment" (1967). He was Executive Producer on the series Banacek. From the late 1970s onward, the bulk of Eckstein's producing work was on several made-for-TV movies and specials, with a year's stint as executive producer of the NBC series Love, Sidney in the midst.

== Early life ==
Eckstein was born in Los Angeles, California, the son of Ruth (née Wexler) and George Eckstein, a salesman.

== Personal life ==
He was married to actress Ann Morgan Guilbert from 1953 until their divorce in 1966, and had two children with her, agent/acting instructor Nora Eckstein and actress Hallie Todd. He later married actress Selette Cole, and had one daughter, Jennifer.

== Death ==
He died of lung cancer at his home in Brentwood, Los Angeles.
