= Prisoner (disambiguation) =

A prisoner is someone incarcerated in a prison, jail or similar facility.

Prisoner(s) or The Prisoner(s) may also refer to:

== Literature ==
- The Prisoner (French: La Prisonnière), the fifth volume of In Search of Lost Time, a 1913–27 novel by Marcel Proust
- The Prisoner, a 1945 novel by Ernst Lothar
- "The Prisoner", a short story featured in The Soft Voice of the Serpent, a 1952 short story collection by South African author Nadine Gordimer
- "The Prisoner", a 1956 short story by Christopher Anvil
- The Prisoner, the alternate English title of Les Louves, a 1956 French novel by Boileau-Narcejac
- The Prisoner, a 1969 novel based on the 1960s television series by Thomas M. Disch
- The Prisoner, a 1974 novel by Margaret Thomson Davis
- Prisoner, a 1986 novel by Sally Beauman under the pen name Vanessa James
- Prisoners and Other Stories, a 1992 short story anthology edited by Ed Gorman
- Prisoners, a 1998 novel by Wayne Karlin
- The Prisoner, a 2001 novel by Cameron Dokey under the pen name Cade Merrill, the sixth installment in The Blair Witch Files
- The Prisoner, a 2001 novel by Karyn Monk, the first volume in the "Kent Family Saga" series
- The Prisoner, a 2001 novel by James Riordan
- Prisoners: A Muslim and a Jew Across the Middle East Divide, a 2006 book by Jeffrey Goldberg
- The Prisoner, a 2012 novel by Robert Muchamore, the fifth installment in the Henderson's Boys series
- The Prisoner, a 2013 novel by Omar Shahid Hamid
- Prisoners, a 2015 novella by Tui T. Sutherland, the first installment in the Wings of Fire: Winglets series
- The Prisoner, a 2017 novel by Alex Berenson, the eleventh installment in the John Wells series

== Theatre ==
- The Prisoner, English title of Il prigioniero, an Italian opera by Luigi Dallapiccola
- The Prisoners, English title of Captivi, a Latin play by Titus Maccius Plautus
- The Prisoner (play), a 1954 play by Bridget Boland
- The Prisoners (play), a Caroline-era stage play by Thomas Killigrew

== Film ==
- Island of Fire, a 1991 Hong Kong film starring Jackie Chan also known as The Prisoner
- The Prisoner (1920 film), a German silent drama film
- The Prisoner (1923 film), featuring Boris Karloff
- The Prisoner (1949 film), a German film
- The Prisoner (1955 film), starring Alec Guinness
- The Prisoner (1963 film), an Australian TV play
- The Prisoner (2013 film), a short film
- The Prisoner or: How I Planned to Kill Tony Blair, a 2007 documentary
- Prisoners (1929 film), an early talking film
- Prisoners (1982 film), an unreleased US–New Zealand drama film
- Prisoners (2013 film), an American thriller film
- Siddharth: The Prisoner, a 2008 Indian film

== Television ==
=== Shows ===
- The Prisoner, a 1967–68 British television series starring Patrick McGoohan
  - The Prisoner (2009 miniseries), a remake of the 1967 series starring Sir Ian McKellen
- Prisoner (TV series), an Australian soap opera that ran from 1979 to 1986, also known as Prisoner: Cell Block H in the UK and the USA and Caged Women in Canada
- Prisoner (Danish TV series) a 2023 Danish prison drama series
- Prisoner (British TV series), a 2026 British TV drama

=== Episodes ===
- "Chapter 6: The Prisoner", The Mandalorian season 1, episode 6 (2019)
- "Prisoner", Bitten season 1, episode 8 (2014)
- "Prisoner", Endride episode 18 (2016)
- "Prisoner", I Led 3 Lives season 3, episode 13 (1955)
- "Prisoner" (Law & Order: Criminal Intent), season 5, episode 3 (2005)
- "Prisoner", Lou Grant season 2, episode 2 (1978)
- "Prisoner", Over There (American TV series) episode 3 (2005)
- "Prisoner", Secret Army series 3, episode 9 (1979)
- "Prisoner", Super Dimension Cavalry Southern Cross episode 1 (1984)
- "Prisoner", The Delivery Man episode 3 (2015)
- "Prisoner", The Fall Guy season 4, episode 4 (1984)
- "Prisoner" (Wentworth), season 4, episode 3 (2016)
- "Prisoner", Witchblade (2006 TV series) episode 12 (2006)
- "Prisoner", Z-Cars series 10, episode 3 (1976)
- "Prisoners", 2030 CE season 2, episode 10 (2003)
- "Prisoners", Alfred Hitchcock Presents (1985 TV series) season 1, episode 9 (1995)
- "Prisoners", Average Joe episode 7 (2023)
- "Prisoners", Cannon season 2, episode 20 (1973)
- "Prisoners", Chosen season 3, episode 4 (2014)
- "Prisoners", Citizen Smith series 4, episode 5 (1980)
- "Prisoners", Family Law (American TV series) season 1, episode 4 (1999)
- "Prisoners" (Gotham), season 2, episode 16 (2016)
- "Prisoners", In the Heat of the Night season 2, episode 5 (1988)
- "Prisoners", Lovers & Liars episode 20 (2023)
- "Prisoners", Marco Polo season 1, episode 9 (2014)
- "Prisoners", Power Rangers RPM episode 17 (2009)
- "Prisoners", Salvation season 2, episode 10 (2018)
- "Prisoners" (Star Wars: The Clone Wars), season 4, episode 3 (2011)
- "Prisoners" (Stargate SG-1), season 2, episode 3 (1998)
- "Prisoners", The Bill series 8, episode 46 (1992)
- "Prisoners", The Chinese Puzzle episode 4 (1974)
- "The Prisoner", Alcoa Presents One Step Beyond season 3, episode 29 (1961)
- "The Prisoner", Arabian Knights episode 17 (1968)
- "The Prisoner", Arthur of the Britons series 2, episode 3 (1973)
- "The Prisoner", Barney Miller season 5, episode 7 (1978)
- "The Prisoner", Bernard season 1, episode 6e (2007)
- "The Prisoner", Best of the West episode 2 (1981)
- "The Prisoner", Cannon season 4, episode 12 (1974)
- "The Prisoner", Combat! season 1, episode 12 (1962)
- "The Prisoner", Crossbow, season 1, episode 2 (1987)
- "The Prisoner", Da Vinci's Demons season 1, episode 3 (2013)
- "The Prisoner", Danger Man series 1, episode 13 (1960)
- "The Prisoner", Dr. Quinn, Medicine Woman season 1, episode 12 (1993)
- "The Prisoner", Friday the 13th: The Series season 2, episode 25 (1989)
- "The Prisoner", Gunsmoke season 7, episode 33 (1962)
- "The Prisoner", Gunsmoke season 14, episode 25 (1969)
- "The Prisoner", Have Gun – Will Travel season 4, episode 14 (1960)
- "The Prisoner", Hawkeye and the Last of the Mohicans episode 29 (1957)
- "The Prisoner", Holby City series 20, episode 1 (2018)
- "The Prisoner", JAG season 1, episode 20 (1996)
- "The Prisoner", Jana of the Jungle episode 7 (1978)
- "The Prisoner", Lawman season 1, episode 2 (1958)
- "The Prisoner: Part 1" and "The Prisoner: Part 2", Matlock season 4, episodes 9–10 (1989)
- "The Prisoner", Sir Francis Drake episode 1 (1961)
- "The Prisoner", Spencer's Pilots episode 2 (1976)
- "The Prisoner", Spyforce episode 4 (1971)
- "The Prisoner", Starhunter season 2, episode 14 (2003)
- "The Prisoner", Supernatural season 10, episode 22 (2015)
- "The Prisoner", Tales of Wells Fargo season 2, episode 24 (1958)
- "The Prisoner", Tarzan (1966 TV series) season 1, episode 5 (1966)
- "The Prisoner", The Adventures of Robin Hood series 2, episode 1 (1956)
- "The Prisoner", The Adventures of William Tell episode 5 (1958)
- "The Prisoner", The Agency season 2, episode 5 (2002)
- "The Prisoner", The Lost World season 2, episode 8 (2000)
- "The Prisoner", The Nurses season 1, episode 7 (1962)
- "The Prisoner", The Rifleman season 3, episode 25 (1961)
- "The Prisoner", Transformers: Cyberverse season 3, episode 10 (2020)
- "The Prisoner", Wander Over Yonder season 1, episode 3 (2013)
- "The Prisoner" (What We Do in the Shadows), season 3, episode 1 (2021)
- "The Prisoners", Bonanza season 13, episode 5 (1971)
- "The Prisoners", Celebrity Deathmatch season 3, episode 14 (2000)
- "The Prisoners", Daniel Boone season 2, episode 21 (1966)
- "The Prisoners", Iron Horse season 2, episode 16 (1967)
- "The Prisoners", Medical Center season 6, episode 7 (1974)
- "The Prisoners", The Interns episode 12 (1970)
- "The Prisoners", Vietnam: The Ten Thousand Day War episode 22 (1981)

== Music ==
- The Prisoners (band), British band

=== Albums ===
- Prisoners (album), a 2012 album by Canadian metal band The Agonist
- Prisoner (Cher album), 1979
- The Prisoner (album), a 1969 album by Herbie Hancock
- Prisoner (The Jezabels album), 2011
- Prisoner (Ryan Adams album), 2017

=== Songs ===
- "Prisoner" (311 song), 1997
- "Prisoner" (Dokken song), 1988
- "The Prisoner" (Howard Jones song), 1989
- "Prisoner" (Jeffree Star song)
- "Prisoner" (The Weeknd song) featuring Lana Del Rey, 2015
- "Prisoner" (Miley Cyrus song) featuring Dua Lipa, 2020
- "Prisoner" (Dance Gavin Dance song), 2020
- "Prisoner" (Love Theme from Eyes of Laura Mars), by Barbra Streisand from the 1978 film
- "Prisoner", by Kabir Suman from Reaching Out, 2003
- "The Prisoner", by The Clash released on Black Market Clash
- "The Prisoner", by England Dan & John Ford Coley from Nights Are Forever
- "The Prisoner", by Iron Maiden from The Number of the Beast
- "Prisoners", by John Denver from Rocky Mountain High
- "The Prisoner", by Roger Daltrey from One of the Boys
- "Prisoner", by Ryan Adams from Prisoner
- "Prisoner", by Steve Angello from Wild Youth
- "The Prisoner", by Tears For Fears from The Hurting
- "Prisoner", by The Jezabels from Prisoner
- "Prisoners", by The Vapors from the Canadian release of New Clear Days

== Other uses ==
- The Prisoners (painting), an 1883 painting by Polish painter Jacek Malczewski
- The Prisoners (Goya), a series of three etchings by Francisco Goya
- "The Prisoner", a ring name of professional wrestler Kevin Wacholz
- The Prisoner (video game), a 1980 computer game based upon the 1967 TV series
- The Prisoners (The Walking Dead), fictional characters from the comic book and television series The Walking Dead

== See also ==
- Inmate (disambiguation)
- La Prisonnière (disambiguation)
