= Barnaby Jones season 2 =

Barnaby Jones
- Season 2
- No. of episodes: 24

Release
- Original network: CBS
- Original release: September 16, 1973 – March 31, 1974

Season chronology
- ← Previous; Season 1 Next → Season 3

This is a list of episodes from the second season of Barnaby Jones. The series premiered on September 16, 1973.

== Broadcast history ==
The season originally aired Sundays at 9:30-10:30 pm (EST).

== Episodes ==
No. overall	No. in season	Title	Directed by	Written by	Original release date	Prod. code
14	1	"Blind Terror"	Walter Grauman	Robert Malcolm Young	September 16, 1973	9754
A blind girl is Barnaby's only lead in his search for a missing student. Richard Bull, Dabney Coleman, Belinda Montgomery, Patricia Smith, and Christopher Stone guest star.
15	2	"Death Leap"	Seymour Robbie	Benjamin Masselink	September 23, 1973	9752
A man attempting suicide is really a diversion for a jewelry heist.Ramon Bieri, Brooke Bundy, Susan Howard, and Tim O'Connor guest star.
16	3	"Echo of a Murder"	Walter Grauman	Calvin Clements, Jr.	September 30, 1973	9751
The owner of a mountain lodge asks Barnaby to prove he didn't kill his wife, even though his guests swear they saw him do it. Stefanie Powers, Wayne Rogers and Daniel J. Travanti guest star.
17	4	"Day of the Viper"	Walter Grauman	Barry Oringer	October 7, 1973	9755
Barnaby suspects that a snake handler's death was no accident. Arch Johnson, Katherine Justice, Andrew Prine, Ford Rainey, and Vincent Van Patten guest star.
18	5	"Trial Run for Death"	Lawrence Dobkin	Robert W. Lenski	October 14, 1973	9753
A race-car driver murders his brother-in-law, then stages a smashup to cover it up. Clu Gulager and Margot Kidder guest star.
19	6	"Catch Me If You Can"	Walter Grauman	George Schenck	October 21, 1973	9757
Barnaby is on the hunt for a psychopathic murderer. James Olson guest stars. Mary Jackson, by then a regular as Emily Baldwin on The Waltons, is one of the killer's victims.
20	7	"Divorce - Murderer's Style"	Lawrence Dobkin	Robert Heverly	October 28, 1973	9756
A woman blackmails a husband she knows arranged for his spouse's death. Glenn Corbett, Nina Foch, and Liam Sullivan guest star.
21	8	"The Deadly Prize"	Michael Caffey	B.W. Sandefur	November 4, 1973	9758
Barnaby is hired by an insurance company to investigate a waterfront murder involving a merchant sailor. Val Avery, James Hong, George Maharis, Madlyn Rhue, Alfred Ryder, and Albert Salmi guest star.
22	9	"Stand-In for Death"	Walter Grauman	Robert W. Lenski	November 11, 1973	9759
A husband kills a man he thought was his wife's lover. Carl Betz and Linda Day George guest star.
23	10	"The Black Art of Dying"	Walter Grauman	Mark Weingart	November 25, 1973	9761
Barnaby tries to determine if a psychic fraud, who preys on a gullible rich woman, had anything to do with a lawyer's death. Walter Brooke, Joanne Linville, Robert Pine, and Fritz Weaver guest star.
24	11	"The Killing Defense"	Michael Caffey	Dick Nelson	December 2, 1973	9760
The prime suspect in a jewel heist is robbed of his gems, his spouse and his life by his own lawyer. Marj Dusay and Leslie Nielsen guest star.
25	12	"Fatal Flight"	Michael Caffey	Calvin Clements, Jr.	December 9, 1973	9762
Barnaby investigates a plane crash that resulted in a corporation president's death. Richard Anderson, Murray Hamilton, and Pippa Scott guest star.
26	13	"Secret of the Dunes"	Alf Kjellin	B.W. Sandefur	December 16, 1973	9763
A weekend motorcyclist witnesses a gangster burial, then pays for it with his life. Robert Hogan, Frank Marth, Phillip Pine, Don Porter, and Laraine Stephens guest star.
27	14	"Venus as in Flytrap"	Corey Allen	S : Jackson Gillis; S/T : Robert Heverly	January 6, 1974	9764
A feminist author murders her male chauvinist lover's wife. Jack Ging and Jessica Walter guest star.
28	15	"The Deadly Jinx"	Robert Douglas	Robert W. Lenski	January 13, 1974	9765
Barnaby is on the case when a rich woman's affairs seem to be ending in terrible accidents. Christopher Connelly, Ida Lupino, and Meredith Baxter guest star.
29	16	"The Platinum Connection"	Seymour Robbie	Calvin Clements, Jr.	January 20, 1974	9766
After a jeweler swindles his insurance company, he comes to suspect that his secretary is on to him. Penny Fuller, Gary Lockwood, and Milton Selzer guest star.
30	17	"Programmed for Killing"	Marc Daniels	B.W. Sandefur	January 27, 1974	9767
A genius and his partner use a computer to commit murder and larceny.
31	18	"A Gold Record for Murder"	George McCowan	Larry Brody	February 10, 1974	9768
In order to preserve his reputation for genius, a rock star kills the ghost writer who always complained for never getting credit.
32	19	"Friends Till Death"	Russ Mayberry	Robert Heverly	February 17, 1974	9769
A friend of Betty's is now smuggling heroin.
33	20	"Rendezvous with Terror"	Seymour Robbie	Calvin Clements, Jr.	February 24, 1974	9770
Barnaby is hired to find the son of a South American ruler.
34	21	"Dark Legacy"	Gene Nelson	Robert W. Lenski	March 3, 1974	9771
A couple murders young men. David Wayne, Eileen Heckart
35	22	"Woman in the Shadows"	Walter Doniger	B.W. Sandefur	March 10, 1974	9772
When a plastic surgeon accidentally kills his patient, he remodels his nurse to look exactly like her.
36	23	"Image in a Cracked Mirror"	William Hale	Gerald Sanford	March 24, 1974	9773
A fortune hunter marries rich women and makes off with their valuables.
37	24	"Foul Play"	Walter Grauman	S : Larry Brody; T : Calvin Clements	March 31, 1974	9774
The owner of a basketball team accidentally kills a man who intended to blackmail the team's star player.
