= Cannon season 5 =

Cannon
- Season 5
- No. of episodes: 25

Release
- Original network: CBS
- Original release: September 10, 1975 – March 3, 1976

Season chronology
- ← Previous; Season 4

This is a list of episodes from the fifth and final season of Cannon.

== Broadcast history ==
The season originally aired Wednesdays at 9:00-10:00 pm (EST).

== Episodes ==
No. overall	No. in season	Title	Directed by	Written by	Original release date
98	1	"Nightmare"	Paul Stanley	Robert Lenski	September 10, 1975
A dying man confesses to causing the deaths of Cannon's wife and child, but dies before revealing his motive.
99	2	"The Deadly Conspiracy: Part 1"	Michael Caffey	Stephen Kandel	September 17, 1975
Cannon teams up with Barnaby Jones to investigate the activities of a large corporation that may include murder.: Note: The story-line finishes in the Barnaby Jones episode "The Deadly Conspiracy: Part 2". For syndication, the ending was re-filmed to resolve the case in one episode, with Bud McKenna (Murray Hamilton) surviving instead of being murdered by Alex Parks (Diana Douglas). Although Miss Douglas is listed in the opening titles, her role is completely edited out of the syndicated version of the Cannon episode.
100	3	"The Wrong Medicine"	Paul Stanley	Norman Lessing	September 24, 1975
Cannon probes a malpractice suit filed against a young resident.
101	4	"The Iceman"	William Wiard	Larry Alexander	October 1, 1975
Cannon reopens a murder case in the hope that he can find evidence to clear an imprisoned friend.
102	5	"The Victim"	Lawrence Dobkin	Jimmy Sangster	October 8, 1975
A singer says that friend, a famed vocalist, is being held hostage.
103	6	"The Man Who Died Twice"	William Wiard	S.S. Schweitzer	October 15, 1975
A corrupt cop who was presumed dead is the prime suspect in the murder of a loan shark.
104	7	"A Touch of Venom"	Chris Robinson	Larry Alexander	October 22, 1975
Radicals poison Cannon and withhold the antidote in an attempt to make him subject to their whims.
105	8	"Man in the Middle"	Allen Reisner	Richard Landau	October 29, 1975
Cannon heads to Mexico to pick up the body of a friend's son, who apparently died under strange circumstances.
106	9	"Fall Guy"	Lawrence Dobkin	Howard Dimsdale	November 5, 1975
Cannon attempts to vindicate the vice-president of an oil company who's accused of misappropriating funds.
107	10	"The Melted Man"	Leo Penn	Norman Lessing	November 12, 1975
A wealthy heiress believes she sees a snowman with a hatchet in its head on her desert estate.
108	11	"The Wedding March"	Leo Penn	Brad Radnitz	November 19, 1975
Cannon hunts for a psychopath who's beating women.
109	12	"The Hero"	William Wiard	Irving Pearlberg	November 26, 1975
Frank investigates the death of a member of a sadistic drug gang, who seems to have been killed by the son of a General and war hero.
110	13	"To Still the Voice"	Leo Penn	S : Robert Heverly; S/T : S.S. Schweitzer	December 3, 1975
Cannon probes a black leader's assassination. This episode is notable because a key suspect from a very wealthy, very conservative family refuses to divulge information that would exonerate himself from the assassination because the information would expose the fact that he was homosexual.
111	14	"The Star"	William Wiard	Margaret Armen	December 10, 1975
112	15	"The Star"	William Wiard	Margaret Armen	December 10, 1975
A former movie star's son disappears without a trace and when Cannon finds him, he must figure out why the boy is being stalked by assassins.
113	16	"The Games Children Play"	William Wiard	S : Jack Turley; T : Albert Aley	December 17, 1975
A boy tries to convince everyone that he saw a kidnapping.
114	17	"The Reformer"	Lawrence Dobkin	Larry Forrester	January 7, 1976
A crusading editor accused of murder hires Cannon to vindicate him.
115	18	"The House of Cards"	Kenneth Gilbert	Robert I. Holt	January 14, 1976
An accountant vanishes after he finds records containing evidence of fraud committed within his company.
116	19	"Revenge"	Paul Stanley	Gene Thompson	January 21, 1976
Cannon is implicated in a mob boss's murder.
117	20	"Cry Wolf"	Lawrence Dobkin	T : Carey Wilber; S/T : Stephen Kandel	January 28, 1976
A multimillionaire suspects foul play in his grandson's supposed kidnapping.
118	21	"The Quasar Kill"	William Wiard	Terence Tunberg & Karl Tunberg	February 4, 1976
Cannon investigates the bizarre case of a scientist getting killed by a laser beam.
119	22	"Snapshot"	Michael Caffey	Leonard Kantor	February 11, 1976
An ex-enforcer hires Cannon to find out why a hit man is stalking him.
120	23	"Point After Death"	Chris Robinson	T : Mann Rubin; S/T : Robert I. Holt	February 18, 1976
Cannon probes the killing of a star quarterback's girlfriend. This episode is notable for the second homosexual-themed storyline of the season, and the series.
121	24	"Bloodlines"	David Whorf	T : Anthony Spinner & Gene Thompson; S/T : Robert C. Dennis	February 25, 1976
A millionaire tries to frame his daughter-in-law for murder.
122	25	"Madman"	William Wiard	Larry Forrester	March 3, 1976
A scientist at an Army base, who's a friend of Cannon's, behaves irrationally, so the detective tries to help him.
