= Edward Musgrove Dealey =

American journalist

Edward Musgrove Dealey (October 5, 1892 – November 27, 1969) was a journalist who became chairman of the board, president, and publisher of A.H. Belo, a media conglomerate that included the Dallas Morning News and WFAA Radio.

== Early life ==
Edward Musgrove (Ted) Dealey was born to George Bannerman Dealey and Olivia Allen on October 5, 1892, in Dallas, Texas.

Dealey attended public schools in Dallas through grade five. In grade six, he was expelled from public school for unspecified reasons and sent to the Terrill School for Boys, which later became St. Mark's School of Texas. For three years, Dealey was the top ranked student at the Terrill School, and he would later say that it was the school's strict disciplinary code that had reformed him. He graduated in 1910 and then attended the University of Texas where he received a bachelor's degree in 1913. From there he went to Harvard University, earning a master's degree in philosophy in 1914.

== Journalism ==
1n 1915, Dealey was a student at the Harvard Business School when he was offered a job at The Dallas Morning News, where his father was vice president of that newspaper's parent company, A.H. Belo. In 1920, the younger Dealey was promoted to staff correspondent.

After his father bought the Morning News and the majority of the A.H. Belo stock from the Belo heirs, the younger Dealey became an A.H. Belo board member. Dealey was appointed vice president in 1932. He succeeded his father as president of A.H. Belo in 1940. When his father died in 1946, Dealey became publisher of The Dallas Morning News as well.

== World War II ==
Dealey served as a major during the war. His first command was the Twenty-ninth Battalion, Texas Defense Guard in 1941–42. He served in the United States Army Specialist Corps between 1942 and 1943.

Dealey also traveled to the Far East as a Morning News staff correspondent; at the conclusion of the war he witnessed the Japanese surrender on the USS Missouri. His war writings were gathered by the Morning News and published in 1945 as Sunset in the East.

== Politics ==
Beginning in the 1920's, Dealey had increasing amounts of influence on the editorial tone of the newspaper.

Ku Klux Klan

Dealey wrote many of the newspaper's anti-Ku Klux Klan articles. In a 1924 memo to his father, for example, he insisted that the paper endorse candidate Miriam Ferguson over the Klan's preferred gubernatorial candidate.

Communism and the Red Scare

While the older Dealey was a Democrat, the younger Dealey was a stridently anti-communist Republican, and the editorial tone of the Morning News veered sharply to the right after the older Dealey died. As described by investigative reporter Peter Elkind:

But the most critical difference between father and son was reflected on the editorial page.... Ted Dealey was a red-baiter, a supporter of Joe McCarthy, an unforgiving opponent of the United Nations, an enemy of social welfare and unions and federal aid, and so was his newspaper.

President John F. Kennedy

In October 1961, Dealey attended a luncheon for newspaper publishers, given at the Kennedy White House. Toward the end of the event, President Kennedy asked if any of the guests wanted to comment. Dealey stood up and read the following prepared statement:

The general opinion of the grassroots thinking in this country is that you and your administration are weak sisters. If we stand firm, there will be no war. The Russians will back down. We need a man on horseback to lead this nation, and many people in Texas and the Southwest think that you are riding Caroline’s [Kennedy's 3-year-old daughter] tricycle.

Kennedy, rankled by the inconsiderate reference to his daughter, frostily responded: "Wars are easier to talk about than they are to fight. I'm just as tough as you are, and I didn't get elected President by arriving at soft judgments."

In November 1963, Dealey approved the publication in the Morning News of a full-page advertisement that was harshly critical of President Kennedy, implying that he was sympathetic to Communism. When President Kennedy saw the ad in that morning's newspaper as he was flying into Dallas on the morning of November 22, 1963, he said to his wife, "we're headed into nut country." He added that the person who'd approved the ad was the same person who'd made the scene at the White House two years earlier. Later that day, President Kennedy was assassinated in Dealey Plaza, named after Dealey's father.

== Other Writing ==
Dealey published articles in such popular magazines as the Saturday Evening Post as well as scholarly journals, such as the Southwestern Historical Quarterly. He wrote accounts of his travels, published several short stories as well as a nonfiction account of the early days of his hometown, Diaper Days of Dallas.

== Cultural references ==
Ted Dealey was played by Jim Backus in the 1985 film Prince Jack. This movie portrays Dealey using a wheelchair and omits the White House encounter with President Kennedy listed above. The film presents Dealey as being present when Lee Harvey Oswald attempted to assassinate General Edwin Walker in April 1963.

== Personal Information ==
Dealey married the former Clara MacDonald on March 1, 1916. They had three children, two of whom survived into adulthood. On June 29, 1951, he married Mrs. Trudie Kelley.

Dealey died of a heart attack on November 27, 1969 in Dallas.

== See also ==
- Notable alumni of St. Mark's School of Texas
