= Barnaby Jones season 3 =

Barnaby Jones
- Season 3
- No. of episodes: 24

Release
- Original network: CBS
- Original release: September 10, 1974 – April 15, 1975

Season chronology
- ← Previous; Season 2 Next → Season 4

This is a list of episodes from the third season of Barnaby Jones. The series premiered on September 10, 1974.

== Broadcast history ==
The season originally aired Tuesdays at 10:00-11:00 pm (EST).

== Episodes ==
No. overall	No. in season	Title	Directed by	Written by	Original release date
38	1	"A Gathering of Thieves"	Walter Grauman	Robert W. Lenski	September 10, 1974
A real-estate scam leads to four murders, including that of a professor who was not pleased with his new property.
39	2	"Dead Man's Run"	Walter Grauman	Calvin Clements, Jr.	September 17, 1974
A comptroller fakes his death to avoid getting arrested for embezzling from an investment firm.
40	3	"The Challenge"	Walter Grauman	Larry Brody	September 24, 1974
As Barnaby attempts to uncover the motives for a man's alleged suicide, another detective tries to cover up the facts.
41	4	"Conspiracy of Terror"	Lawrence Dobkin	B.W. Sandefur	October 1, 1974
A Pulitzer Prize-winning author ends up dead after he gains a prisoner's confession of innocence.
42	5	"Odd Man Loses"	Walter Grauman	Joel Murcott	October 8, 1974
An industrialist is accidentally killed in a holdup before he's able to close a shady deal.
43	6	"Forfeit by Death"	Leslie H. Martinson	Robert Sherman	October 15, 1974
When a bondsman's client fails to deliver stolen valuables in exchange for bail, the bondsman kills him.
44	7	"Blueprint for a Caper"	Corey Allen	Gerald Sanford	October 29, 1974
Recently released from prison, the leader of a burglary ring murders his partner for taking his girlfriend.
45	8	"Mystery Cycle"	William Wiard	Calvin Clements, Jr.	November 12, 1974
An insurance settlement hangs on the result of an investigation of a motorcycle manufacturer's death.
46	9	"Dark Homecoming"	William Wiard	Benjamin Masselink	November 19, 1974
Barnaby must find out what happened to a woman who disappeared after dating a country singer's ex.
47	10	"Time to Kill"	Leslie H. Martinson	Larry Alexander	November 26, 1974
When a dinner guest falls asleep, his host steals his diamond.
48	11	"Death on Deposit"	Robert Douglas	Jack B. Sowards	December 3, 1974
A cattleman is murdered in his own corral on the day he was to withdraw his money from the bank.
49	12	"Web of Deceit"	Seymour Robbie	Robert Pirosh	December 10, 1974
A newsman takes pictures of evidence showing that an industrialist is involved with the mob.
50	13	"The Last Contract"	Seymour Robbie	Robert Heverly	December 31, 1974
A mother asks Barnaby to help her find her runaway daughter, who's married to an amateur contract killer. The case is further muddled with the involvement of the husband's loser brother.
51	14	"Trap Play"	Leslie H. Martinson	Barry Oringer	January 7, 1975
After a marital spat, a wife leaves her spouse to meet a football player in an ultimately fatal rendezvous.
52	15	"Murder Once Removed"	Ralph Senensky	Robert W. Lenski	January 21, 1975
A woman murders her father-in-law when he refuses to give her any money.
53	16	"Counterfall"	Alf Kjellin	Joel Murcott	February 4, 1975
An escaped convict asks Barnaby to help him prove he didn't kill a judge.
54	17	"Dangerous Summer"	Corey Allen	B.W. Sandefur	February 11, 1975
A friend hires Barnaby to find his missing son.
55	18	"Image of Evil"	Leo Penn	Larry Brody	February 18, 1975
A film director arranges for the death of his leading man.
56	19	"Fantasy of Fear"	Leo Penn	Robert W. Lenski	February 25, 1975
A series of strange events lead the victim of a nervous-breakdown to the edge of a relapse.
57	20	"Doomed Alibi"	Richard C. Bennett	Martin Roth	March 11, 1975
An actor-turned-business frames his double for the murder of his partner.
58	21	"The Deadlier Species"	Leslie H. Martinson	Lou Shaw	March 18, 1975
A lawyer is killed when he finds out who's been swindling women.
59	22	"Poisoned Pigeon"	Richard C. Bennett	Skip Webster	March 25, 1975
A pair of con artists murder a victim who's found them out.
60	23	"Jeopardy for Two"	Michael Caffey	Carey Wilber	April 1, 1975
Barnaby follows a double agent who's stolen a porcelain collection.
61	24	"Bond of Fear"	Leslie H. Martinson	Robert Sherman	April 15, 1975
Barnaby is hired to re-investigate a case in which a woman is found innocent of murder by a jury, but found guilty by the townspeople.
