= Barnaby Jones season 5 =

Barnaby Jones
- Season 5
- No. of episodes: 24

Release
- Original network: CBS
- Original release: October 7, 1976 – May 19, 1977

Season chronology
- ← Previous; Season 4 Next → Season 6

This is a list of episodes from the fifth season of Barnaby Jones.

== Broadcast history ==
The season originally aired Thursdays at 10:00-11:00 pm (EST).

== Episodes ==
No. overall	No. in season	Title	Directed by	Written by	Original release date
86	1	"Blood Vengeance"	Walter Grauman	Dick Nelson	October 7, 1976
Barnaby sets out to avenge his cousin's murder.
87	2	"Deadline for Dying"	Walter Grauman	Robert W. Lenski	October 14, 1976
A journalist's investigation of a land scandal ends in murder and blackmail.
88	3	"Sins of Thy Father"	Walter Grauman	Gerald Sanford	October 21, 1976
A pilot's body, slashed by a propeller, is found on an airship.
89	4	"The Fatal Dive"	Walter Grauman	Paul Robert Coyle	October 28, 1976
Treasure hunters falsify the facts of a diver's death to prevent anyone from meddling in their quest.
90	5	"Final Ransom"	Mel Damski	Mann Rubin	November 11, 1976
A man returns from prison and learns that his partner in a ten-year-old kidnapping never gave back the abducted child.
91	6	"Band of Evil"	Walter Grauman	Robert W. Lenski	November 18, 1976
Barnaby and J.R. help a cowgirl look for a missing broncobuster, unaware that he's already been murdered.
92	7	"Voice in the Night"	Leslie H. Martinson	Robert Sherman	December 2, 1976
A woman who allegedly killed herself a year ago is now the unlikely suspect in a series of murders.
93	8	"The Bounty Hunter"	Alf Kjellin	William Keys	December 16, 1976
Barnaby must beat a bounty hunter to an escaped convict who can vindicate a prison trustee charged with murder.
94	9	"Renegade's Child"	Harry Falk	Larry Alexander	December 23, 1976
Barnaby's search for a 6-year-old boy leads him to the boy's father - a vagrant who deals in illegal arms.
95	10	"Fraternity of Thieves"	Mel Damski	Gerald Sanford	December 30, 1976
A pair of amateur thieves attempt to cover up the death of their cohort during a holdup - at the risk of the diamonds they've stolen.
96	11	"Sister of Death"	Michael Caffey	Bethel Leslie & Gerry Day	January 6, 1977
A nun is accused of taking her terminally ill sister off life support.
97	12	"The Deadly Charade"	Michael Caffey	Calvin Clements, Jr.	January 13, 1977
Betty falls for a playboy who's planning a murder to gain an inheritance.
98	13	"Testament of Power"	Alf Kjellin	Stanley Roberts	January 20, 1977
The executors of a millionaire's estate attempt to get rid of a new will putting them out of their jobs.
99	14	"Copy-Cat Killing"	Leslie H. Martinson	Larry Forrester	January 27, 1977
A husband kills his wife's lover.
100	15	"A Simple Case of Terror"	Michael Caffey	Calvin Clements, Jr.	February 3, 1977
A man is tricked into thinking he committed a murder, but the real killer is his own friend who smuggles diamonds.
101	16	"The Marathon Murders"	Walter Grauman	Worley Thorne	February 17, 1977
Barnaby probes the death of a heavily-insured man that is believed to be an accident.
102	17	"Duet for Dying"	Leo Penn	Gerald Sanford	February 24, 1977
A pair of amateur singers commit larceny and murder in an attempt to finance a record.
103	18	"Circle of Treachery"	Walter Grauman	Robert Sherman	March 3, 1977
After a pair of incompetent US Marshalls allow a sole witness to escape protective custody, a thief awaiting trial has his accomplice put out a contract on the witness to the crime.
104	19	"Anatomy of Fear"	Walter Grauman	Gerald Sanford	March 17, 1977
A rapist threatens to get more violent with Betty's friend if she tells the police.
105	20	"The Killer on Campus"	Leo Penn	Dick Nelson	March 24, 1977
Barnaby probes the supposed suicide of a college professor who had been the victim of his student's pranks.
106	21	"The Deadly Valentine"	Walter Grauman	Mann Rubin	March 31, 1977
A murderer is sending valentines to his victims before killing them - and Betty may be the next target.
107	22	"Duet for Danger"	Leslie H. Martinson	Gerald Sanford	May 5, 1977
The two amateur singers that Barnaby put in jail escape and head for Nashville.
108	23	"The Inside Man"	Guerdon Trueblood	Paul Robert Coyle	May 12, 1977
An aspiring robber is declared a hero for facing his double-crossing partner.
109	24	"Run Away to Terror"	Kenneth Gilbert	Gerald Sanford	May 19, 1977
A runaway thinks she committed a murder.
