= Barnaby Jones season 7 =

Barnaby Jones
- Season 7
- No. of episodes: 25

Release
- Original network: CBS
- Original release: September 21, 1978 – April 19, 1979

Season chronology
- ← Previous; Season 6 Next → Season 8

This is a list of episodes from the seventh season of Barnaby Jones.

== Broadcast history ==
The season originally aired Thursdays at 10:00-11:00 pm (EST).

== Episodes ==
No. overall	No. in season	Title	Directed by	Written by	Original release date
132	1	"Blind Jeopardy"	Walter Grauman	William Keys	September 21, 1978
Barnaby must find a key witness to a murder hiding in a remote area before hit men do.
133	2	"A Dangerous Affair"	Dick Lowry	Dick Nelson	September 28, 1978
A salesman murders a customer who was going to expose his corrupt business practices.
134	3	"Deadly Sanctuary"	Leo Penn	Mann Rubin	October 12, 1978
A rapist terrorizes a resort where Betty is vacationing.
135	4	"Hitch-Hike to Terror"	Walter Grauman	S : Jeff Kanter; T : Mann Rubin	October 19, 1978
A young woman claiming to be Barnaby's daughter asks him to clear her of false drug charges.
136	5	"Nest of Scorpions"	Kenneth Gilbert	Norman Jolley	October 26, 1978
J.R. goes to a mountain resort to find real estate developer who's gone missing.
137	6	"Death of a Friendship"	Bruce Kessler	Robert E. Swanson	November 9, 1978
A millionaire hires Barnaby to rescue his son from kidnappers. Guests: Lawrence Casey, Jo Ann Harris, Christopher Allport, Ward Costello
138	7	"A Frame for Murder"	Leo Penn	Dallas L. Barnes	November 16, 1978
J.R. attempts to save his reputation when he's framed for rape.
139	8	"Stages of Fear"	Leo Penn	Marc Brandell	November 23, 1978
Betty's former drama coach asks her to look into a series of unexplained events that are scaring a young actress.
140	9	"Victim of Love"	Walter Grauman	Jack V. Fogarty	November 30, 1978
J.R.'s old flame asks him to protect her from her desperate ex-husband.
141	10	"Memory of a Nightmare"	Walter Grauman	Shirley Leeds	December 14, 1978
Betty's escort is killed in a car crash, leaving her with partial amnesia and on suspicion of drunken driving.
142	11	"The Picture Pirates"	Kenneth Gilbert	S : Jon Christiansen & Brigitt Christiansen; T : Robert Sherman	December 21, 1978
While investigating a murder in Hollywood, Barnaby discovers that it was committed to cover-up the theft of a movie print to be used in a film-piracy racket.
143	12	"Academy of Evil"	Ray Austin	Margaret Armen and Alf Harris	December 28, 1978
Betty investigates a series of mishaps terrorizing the faculty of a private girls' school.
144	13	"The Medium"	Dick Lowry	Gerald Sanford	January 4, 1979
J.R. goes from skeptic to believer when he helps a psychic investigate the disappearances of several young women.
145	14	"Echo of a Distant Battle"	Walter Grauman	Gerald Sanford	January 11, 1979
146	15	"Echo of a Distant Battle"	Walter Grauman	Gerald Sanford	January 11, 1979
Barnaby tangles with violent veterans of the Vietnam war as he attempts to clear the name of an Army deserter who's still missing.
147	16	"The Enslaved"	Michael Caffey	Jeff Myrow	January 18, 1979
While investigating a death at a posh sanitarium, Betty discovers a sinister plot to defraud the patients.
148	17	"Dance with Death"	Ron Satlof	Larry Alexander	January 25, 1979
When a friend of a disco dancer is found murdered, she believes she's a killer's real target.
149	18	"The Protectors"	Seymour Robbie	Jack V. Fogarty	February 1, 1979
An assault on a businessman leads Barnaby to work with a firm that specializes in preventing terrorist kidnappings.
150	19	"Fatal Overture"	Graeme Clifford	Dick Nelson	February 8, 1979
A husband and wife are framed for the death of the husband's ex-lover.
151	20	"Master of Deception"	Kenneth Gilbert	Gerald Sanford	February 22, 1979
A man marries many women involved in electronics projects to steal their industrial secrets.
152	21	"A Short Happy Life"	John Carter	Robert W. Lenski	March 1, 1979
Betty's cousin is unaware that she's carrying a locker key that the two men stalking her are willing to kill for.
153	22	"Child of Love, Child of Vengeance"	Michael Preece	Robert W. Lenski	March 15, 1979
154	23	"Child of Love, Child of Vengeance"	Michael Preece	Robert W. Lenski	March 22, 1979
Barnaby's probing of a lawyer's murder leads him to a religious cult. When he gets too close, he is framed for a felony. A member of the cult that Barnaby has encountered may be the key to solving the murder of a lawyer the detective's been investigating.: NOTE: This two part episode aired just four months after the Jonestown Massacre.
155	24	"Target for a Wedding"	Robert Sherman	Robert Sherman	April 12, 1979
An heiress doesn't know that the fortune hunter she's fallen for has murdered her benefactor.
156	25	"Temptation"	Joseph Manduke	Norman Jolley	April 19, 1979
As a police lieutenant ends up falling for the ex-girlfriend of a murderer in trying to make her a witness to have the murderer convicted, he's framed for the murder of a second witness, so Barnaby and J.R. try to clear him.
