= Cannon season 3 =

Cannon
- Season 3
- No. of episodes: 25

Release
- Original network: CBS
- Original release: September 12, 1973 – March 20, 1974

Season chronology
- ← Previous; Season 2 Next → Season 4

This is a list of episodes from the third season of Cannon.

== Broadcast history ==
The season originally aired Wednesdays at 9:00-10:00 pm (EST).

== Episodes ==
No. overall	No. in season	Title	Directed by	Written by	Original release date
49	1	"He Who Digs a Grave"	Richard Donner	T : Stephen Kandel	September 12, 1973
50	2	"He Who Digs a Grave"	Richard Donner	T : Stephen Kandel	September 12, 1973
Cannon encounters trouble when he attempts to clear a friend charged with murder.: Based on a novel by David Delman.
51	3	"Memo from a Dead Man"	Richard Donner	Robert C. Dennis	September 19, 1973
A dead man's will hires Cannon to find out if any of his heirs had something to do with his death.
52	4	"Hounds of Hell"	Lawrence Dobkin	Jack Turley	September 26, 1973
A Vietnam vet hires Cannon to investigate when vicious dogs murder two ex-GIs who served with the vet.
53	5	"Target in the Mirror"	Gene Nelson	Robert Blees	October 3, 1973
Cannon is unaware that the man who killed his client happens to be an old friend who's a police lieutenant.
54	6	"Murder by Proxy"	Robert Douglas	Robert W. Lenski	October 10, 1973
While having to deal with an incompetent police detective, Cannon tries to clear a woman who has been framed for murder.
55	7	"Night Flight to Murder"	Michael Caffey	Carey Wilber	October 17, 1973
Cannon searches for a hijacked plane that was carrying $3,000,000 worth of securities.
56	8	"Come Watch Me Die"	George McCowan	Herb Meadow	October 24, 1973
A man escapes from a mental hospital to find his wife, certain that she framed him for murder.
57	9	"The Perfect Alibi"	Robert Douglas	Ray Brenner & Jack Guss	October 31, 1973
A man accused of robbing a safe has a solid alibi: he had been in jail for a year.
58	10	"Dead Lady's Tears"	Virgil W. Vogel	Steve Fisher	November 7, 1973
Cannon must clear a man suspected of killing a model he was with before her death.
59	11	"The Limping Man"	Michael Caffey	Shirl Hendryx	November 14, 1973
Cannon looks for a fugitive in the hope that he can save a policeman's reputation.
60	12	"Trial by Terror"	Robert Douglas	Larry Brody	November 21, 1973
The syndicate kidnaps a judge's daughter in order to curry the outcome of a trial in their favor.
61	13	"Murder by the Numbers"	George McCowan	S : Michael McTaggart; T : Robert Blees	November 28, 1973
A socialite's new husband is revealed to be a blackmailer and a bigamist.
62	14	"Valley of the Damned"	Lawrence Dobkin	Carey Wilber	December 5, 1973
Cannon's attempts to clear an Indian of murder lead him to search for others who have vanished without a trace.
63	15	"A Well-Remembered Terror"	Seymour Robbie	Robert I. Holt	December 12, 1973
An airline's pilot scheme of his own plane's hijacking is jeopardized by his panicky partner.
64	16	"Arena of Fear"	Marc Daniels	Collier Young & Meyer Dolinsky	December 19, 1973
A boxer's manager claims that the fighter killed a man he punched in a barroom brawl.
65	17	"Photo Finish"	George McCowan	John Hawkins	January 2, 1974
Cannon is hired to find out who murdered a mercanary's brother.
66	18	"Duel in the Desert"	William Wiard	Robert C. Dennis	January 16, 1974
Cannon get amnesia and forgets about the ransom he was to deliver for a kidnapped woman.
67	19	"Where's Jennifer?"	Gene Nelson	Robert White & Phyllis White	January 23, 1974
Cannon follows a girl who supposedly died long ago.
68	20	"Blood Money"	William Wiard	Stephen Kandel	February 6, 1974
A lawyer arranges for his imprisoned client's death, then searches for the man's hidden fortune.
69	21	"Death of a Hunter"	George McCowan	Meyer Dolinsky	February 13, 1974
Cannon investigates when a supposedly tranquilized lion mauls an animal keeper.
70	22	"The Cure That Kills"	Seymour Robbie	Worley Thorne	February 20, 1974
A fake faith healer bumps off the only witness to a murder he committed.
71	23	"Bobby Loved Me"	Lawrence Dobkin	Joel Murcott	February 27, 1974
Cannon searches for the culprit who murdered a dancer who swindled lonely women out of their savings.
72	24	"Triangle of Terror"	George McCowan	Carey Wilber	March 13, 1974
A millionaire is believed to have killed himself at a resort after embezzling money from his own bank.
73	25	"The Stalker"	Lawrence Dobkin	Richard Newhafer	March 20, 1974
An escaped murderer stalks Cannon while the detective is on vacation.
