= Cannon season 1 =

Cannon
- Season 1
- No. of episodes: 24

Release
- Original network: CBS
- Original release: September 14, 1971 – March 14, 1972

Season chronology
- Next → Season 2

This is a list of episodes from the first season of Cannon.

== Broadcast history ==
The season originally aired Tuesday at 9:30-10:30 pm (EST).

== Episodes ==
No. overall	No. in season	Title	Directed by	Written by	Original release date
1	1	"The Salinas Jackpot"	George McCowan	Ken Trevey	September 14, 1971
Cannon trails two men disguised as clowns who committed multiple murders at a rodeo.
2	2	"Death Chain"	Jerry Jameson	Paul Playdon & David Moessinger	September 21, 1971
Cannon investigates the murder of a bank manager's mistress.
3	3	"Call Unicorn"	Allen Reisner	S : E. Arthur Kean; T : David Moessinger & Paul Playdon	September 28, 1971
Cannon goes undercover as a truck driver to weed out a group of killers who are running a smuggling operation.
4	4	"Country Blues"	Allen Reisner	Ronald Austin & James D. Buchanan	October 5, 1971
Cannon is hired by an insurance company to investigate the death of a Western music superstar.
5	5	"Scream of Silence"	Jerry Jameson	Robert Collins	October 12, 1971
When the kidnapping of a political candidate's son goes awry, Cannon must lure out the culprits after the shock renders the boy unable to speak.
6	6	"Fool's Gold"	Don Medford	S : Bill Stratton; T : Edward Hume	October 19, 1971
While trying to retrieve stolen loot in a deserted town, Cannon uncovers a conspiracy.
7	7	"Girl in the Electric Coffin"	Jerry Jameson	Robert Malcolm Young	October 26, 1971
Cannon helps a mother look for her missing daughter after the first detective he recommended is killed, and discovers a plot involving a love triangle mixed with murder.
8	8	"Dead Pigeon"	Don Taylor	S : George Kirgo; S/T : James D. Buchanan & Ronald Austin	November 9, 1971
Cannon searches for the culprit who framed an L.A. detective and former colleague for murder.
9	9	"A Lonely Place to Die"	William Hale	Jack Turley	November 16, 1971
Cannon's investigation of a triple slaying leads him to a syndicate chieftain.
10	10	"No Pockets in a Shroud"	William Hale	Ken Pettus	November 23, 1971
Cannon investigates a case involving a reclusive millionaire and his missing heir.
11	11	"Stone, Cold Dead"	Seymour Robbie	Paul Playdon & David Moessinger	November 30, 1971
Cannon must vindicate a veteran accused of murder.
12	12	"Death Is a Double-Cross"	Richard Donner	T : Edward Hume & George Eckstein	December 7, 1971
Cannon's job on a train costs a young mother her life. Based on the novel "Every Bet's a Sure Thing" by Thomas B. Dewey.
13	13	"The Nowhere Man"	George McCowan	Michael Gleason	December 14, 1971
An accountant decides to use stolen nerve gas in order to teach society a lesson.
14	14	"Flight Plan"	Richard Donner	Robert C. Dennis	December 28, 1971
Cannon designs an escape plan for a man who lied about his predicament, only to have to chase the man after learning the truth.
15	15	"Devil's Playground"	Marvin Chomsky	Ken Trevey	January 4, 1972
A foolish ex-cop enlists Cannon's help to catch the killer who assaulted him.
16	16	"Treasure of San Ignacio"	Allen Reisner	T : Paul Playdon; S/T : Bill S. Ballinger	January 11, 1972
A blasphemous ex-racecar driver steals relics from a Mexican church, leading Frank to ask a fellow investigator to come out of retirement. Guest stars Tab Hunter, Paul Petersen and Alejandro Rey
17	17	"Blood on the Vine"	George McCowan	S : Ken Pettus; T : Stephen Kandel	January 18, 1972
A beloved winegrower is targeted for murder.
18	18	"To Kill a Guinea Pig"	Allen Reisner	Hal Sitowitz	February 1, 1972
A terrorized doctor gets involved in a sinister research project.
19	19	"The Island Caper"	Lewis Allen	George Bellak	February 8, 1972
A reformed bank robber is pressed to do one last job.
20	20	"A Deadly Quiet Town"	Seymour Robbie	Robert W. Lenski	February 15, 1972
Cannon tangles with a satanic cult.
21	21	"A Flight of Hawks"	Charles S. Dubin	Stephen Kandel	February 22, 1972
Cannon suspects that amateur mercenaries in an African revolution are up to something.
22	22	"The Torch"	Michael O'Herlihy	James D. Buchanan & Ronald Austin	February 29, 1972
An insurance investigator commits a murder - and probes it himself.
23	23	"Cain's Mark"	Don Taylor	George Bellak	March 7, 1972
An illicit-arms dealer is at war with his brother.
24	24	"Murder by Moonlight"	Seymour Robbie	Karl Tunberg	March 14, 1972
A young convict serves an imprisoned gang boss.
