= Barnaby Jones season 8 =

Barnaby Jones
- Season 8
- No. of episodes: 22

Release
- Original network: CBS
- Original release: September 20, 1979 – April 3, 1980

Season chronology
- ← Previous; Season 7

This is a list of episodes from the eighth and final season of Barnaby Jones.

== Broadcast history ==
The season originally aired Thursdays at 10:00-11:00 pm (EST) from September 20 to November 29, 1979 and at 9:00-10:00 pm (EST) from December 20, 1979 to April 3, 1980.

== Episodes ==
| No. overall | No. in season | Title | Directed by | Written by | Original release date |
|---|---|---|---|---|---|
| 157 | 1 | "Man on Fire" | Seymour Robbie | Jack V. Fogarty | September 20, 1979 |
Barnaby works with a claims adjuster in an arson-and-murder case. Gary Lockwood and Michael Strong guest star.
| 158 | 2 | "Nightmare in Hawaii" | Michael Caffey | Robert Sherman | September 27, 1979 |
| 159 | 3 | "Nightmare in Hawaii" | Michael Caffey | Robert Sherman | September 27, 1979 |
In Hawaii, J.R. is framed for murder and thrown in jail by a vengeful and incompetent cop (Tim O'Connor). Dan O'Herlihy guest stars.
| 160 | 4 | "A Desperate Pursuit" | Seymour Robbie | Norman Jolley | October 11, 1979 |
Betty's testimony in a trial puts herself in danger and gets her attention from an impressed reporter (Jack Ging).
| 161 | 5 | "Design for Madness" | Dennis Donnelly | Dick Nelson | October 18, 1979 |
Barnaby tries to help her emotionally disturbed niece when she's suspected of murdering her husband and his lawyer during memory lapses.
| 162 | 6 | "Girl on the Road" | Kenneth Gilbert | Gerald Sanford | October 25, 1979 |
A runaway girl discovers that the glitter of the drug world has a deadly underside.
| 163 | 7 | "Indoctrination in Evil" | Leo Penn | Gerald Sanford | November 1, 1979 |
While on the search for a missing girl, Betty uncovers a center for white slavers.
| 164 | 8 | "Homecoming for a Dead Man" | Bruce Kessler | Jack B. Sowards | November 8, 1979 |
Barnaby finds a man who vanished ten years ago - along with a fortune in stolen gold.
| 165 | 9 | "False Witness" | Winrich Kolbe | Paul Robert Coyle | November 29, 1979 |
Betty probes the rape of a friend who was in shock when she identified her attacker.
| 166 | 10 | "School of Terror" | Kenneth Gilbert | William Keys | December 20, 1979 |
Drug dealers infiltrate a treatment center and murder J.R.'s counselor friend. Ed Harris, Sean Penn, Madeline Stowe, and John Witherspoon guest star.
| 167 | 11 | "Cry for Vengeance" | Allen Baron | Robert I. Holt | December 27, 1979 |
Barnaby must deal with an incompetent cop after the son of a friend, a former police officer, is killed as a warning not to interfere with the local protection racket. A Martinez guest stars
| 168 | 12 | "Run to Death" | John Carter | John Donley & Linda Fortney | January 3, 1980 |
Betty's friend dies of an alleged heart attack during his constitutional.
| 169 | 13 | "The Price of Anger" | Larry Elikann | Albert Aley | January 10, 1980 |
Black cab driver Wes Carter (Lawrence Hilton Jacobs) runs from a murder scene on the grounds that circumstantial evidence - and racism - would make him the prime suspect.
| 170 | 14 | "The Killing Point" | Michael Preece | Robert W. Lenski | January 17, 1980 |
Barnaby looks for a millionaire's mistress, unaware that she's stolen a priceless objet d'art.
| 171 | 15 | "Focus on Fear" | Kenneth Gilbert | Jack V. Fogarty | January 31, 1980 |
Thugs steal a photographer's negatives and blind her after she does an assignment at an air-freight terminal.
| 172 | 16 | "Murder in the Key of C" | Michael Caffey | Robert I. Holt | February 7, 1980 |
Barnaby is hired to find a composer's fiance who disappeared running away from unscrupulous music publishers.
| 173 | 17 | "Killer Without a Name" | Kenneth C. Gilbert | David P. Harmon | February 14, 1980 |
While on a cruise, Betty falls for a man who's being targeted by South American street police.
| 174 | 18 | "Death Is the Punchline" | Dick Lowry | Paul Robert Coyle | February 21, 1980 |
A comic is suspected of killing the nightclub owner who fired him after his act proved to be a flop.
| 175 | 19 | "The Final Victim" | Robert Sherman | S : Philip Saltzman; S/T : Robert Sherman | March 6, 1980 |
A columnist writing about prostitution focuses on a murdered girl whose reputation Barnaby is trying to save.
| 176 | 20 | "The Silent Accuser" | Graeme Clifford | Carolyn See & Jackie Joseph | March 13, 1980 |
Betty responds to an SOS from her teacher friend, only to find her dead.
| 177 | 21 | "Deadline for Murder" | Lewis Teague | Larry Alexander | March 27, 1980 |
A pair of men pretending to be Barnaby and J.R. murder a writer employed by a sleazy publishing empire.
| 178 | 22 | "The Killin' Cousin" | Michael Preece | Norman Jolley | April 3, 1980 |
Betty is suspected of killing two members of her family by father-and-son detectives. This was intended to launch a spin off called Tarkington (named after the father and son) but due to the comedic plot and bad ratings, plans for the spin off were abandoned.
