= Crowhaven Farm =

- Written by: John McGreevey
- Directed by: Walter Grauman
- Starring: Hope Lange; Paul Burke; Lloyd Bochner; John Carradine
- Music by: Robert Drasnin
- Country of origin: United States
- Original language: English

Production
- Executive producer: Aaron Spelling
- Producer: Walter Grauman
- Cinematography: Fleet Southcott
- Editor: Aaron Stell
- Running time: 74 minutes
- Production company: Aaron Spelling Productions

Original release
- Network: ABC
- Release: November 24, 1970

Crowhaven Farm is a 1970 American made-for-television supernatural horror film and folk horror film directed by Walter Grauman and starring Hope Lange, Paul Burke and John Carradine. It originally aired as the ABC Movie of the Week on November 24, 1970.

== Plot ==
A young couple, Maggie and Ben, inherit an old New England farm. Soon after moving in, Maggie starts having terrifying visions that seem to point to a ghastly past involving witches and Satanic cults. Soon, the sinister past has evil designs for the new couple.

== Cast ==
- Hope Lange as Margaret "Maggie" Kerry Porter
- Paul Burke as Ben Porter
- Lloyd Bochner as Kevin Pierce
- John Carradine as Nate Cheever
- Cindy Eilbacher as Jennifer
- Cyril Delevanti as Harold Dane
- Milton Selzer as Dr. Terminer
- Patricia Barry as Felicia
- William Smith as Mounted Policeman (Patrolman Hayes)

== Production ==
The film was announced in August 1970.

The film was banned by the apartheid censor board in South Africa although that country had no television service until 1975.

== Reception ==
=== Critical ===
The Los Angeles Times called it "spooky, diverting".

Terror Trap gave the film 4 out of 4 stars, calling it "[an] Exceptional TV horror", and praised the film's performances, plot, and atmosphere. Maitland McDonagh from TV Guide gave the film 3/5 stars, commending the film's "creepy atmosphere and dark twist ending", while noting that the film had fewer shocks than its contemporaries. Craig Butler from Allmovie praised the film, calling it "One of the best of the made-for-TV "horror" films that proliferated in the early 1970s".

Kieran Fisher at Film School Rejects wrote:

If you’re a fan of supernatural Satanic paranoia, Crowhaven Farm will tickle your sweet spots. The film doesn’t try to be original by any means, but it’s an effective slice of TV terror that knows how to deliver the good stuff.

=== Ratings ===
The film was the fifth highest-rated show on US television on the week it aired, following Swing Out, Sweet Land, Marcus Welby, M.D., a special of Oklahoma!, and Here's Lucy.
