= The Memory of Eva Ryker =

- Genre: Drama
- Based on: The Memory of Eva Ryker by Donald Stanwood
- Written by: Laurence Heath
- Directed by: Walter Grauman
- Starring: Natalie Wood; Robert Foxworth; Ralph Bellamy; Roddy McDowall
- Music by: Richard LaSalle
- Original language: English

Production
- Producer: Irwin Allen
- Cinematography: John M. Nickolaus Jr.
- Editor: John A. Fegan Jr.
- Running time: 144 minutes
- Production company: Irwin Allen Productions

Original release
- Network: CBS
- Release: May 7, 1980

The Memory of Eva Ryker is a 1980 American television drama film starring Natalie Wood, Robert Foxworth and Ralph Bellamy. It was produced by Irwin Allen and directed by Walter Grauman. The film premiered on CBS on May 7, 1980.

It was based on a 1978 novel by Donald Stanwood which was originally set on the Titanic.

Filming took place in late 1979.

== Plot ==
A woman has spent her life tormented by the death of her mother, who was on a cruise ship torpedoed during World War II. When her father hires an investigator to look into the circumstances of her mother's death, it triggers a new rash of emotional turmoil for the woman.

== Cast ==
- Natalie Wood as Eva Ryker / Claire Ryker
- Robert Foxworth as Norman Hall
- Ralph Bellamy as William E. Ryker
- Roddy McDowall as MacFarland
- Bradford Dillman as Jason Eddington
- Jean-Pierre Aumont as Inspector Laurier
- Mel Ferrer as Dr. Sanford
- Peter Graves as Mike Rogers
- Morgan Fairchild as Lisa Eddington
- Robert Hogan as J.H. Martin
- Vince Howard as Albert
- Tonya Crowe as Eva as a child
