= Inmate (disambiguation) =

An inmate is a prisoner.

Inmate or Inmates may also refer to:

- The Inmate, a 2018 American TV series
- The Inmates, a British pub rock band
- "Inmates" (The Walking Dead), a TV episode
- Operation Inmate, in the Pacific Ocean during the Second World War

== See also ==
- Prisoner (disambiguation)
