= La Prisonnière =

La Prisonnière may refer to:

- La Prisonnière (film), or Woman in Chains, a 1968 film
- The Captive (play), or La prisonnière, a 1926 play by Édouard Bourdet
- The Prisoner (La Prisonnière), volume 5 of In Search of Lost Time by Marcel Proust
- Stolen Lives: Twenty Years in a Desert Jail, translated from La Prisonnière, a 1999 autobiography by Malika Oufkir

== See also ==
- The Prisoner (disambiguation)
