= Prince Jack =

- 1985 VHS Home Video box image
- Directed by: Bert Lovitt
- Written by: Bert Lovitt
- Produced by: Jim Milio; Alain Silver, Patrick Regan (Associate Producers)
- Starring: Robert J. Hogan; James F. Kelly; Lloyd Nolan; Kenneth Mars
- Cinematography: Hiro Narita
- Music by: Elmer Bernstein
- Distributed by: Castle Hill Productions
- Release date: December 1985
- Running time: 100 minutes
- Country: United States
- Language: English

Prince Jack is a 1985 film from Castle Hill Productions which dramatizes some of the inner workings of the Kennedy administration, including efforts by Attorney General Robert F. Kennedy to address the issues arising from the Civil Rights Movement. Although primarily a dramatic narrative, Prince Jack also uses satire and black humor, especially with regard to the Kennedy brothers' complicated relationship with Lyndon B. Johnson.

Prince Jack covers the period from the Democratic National Convention in July 1960 to the autumn of 1963, just prior to the assassination of John F. Kennedy. The film was written and directed by Bert Lovitt.

This is Dana Andrews' final film appearance.

== Cast ==
- Robert J. Hogan - John F. Kennedy
- James F. Kelly - Robert F. Kennedy
- Lloyd Nolan - Joseph P. Kennedy Sr.
- Kenneth Mars - Lyndon B. Johnson
- Dana Andrews - The Cardinal
- Robert Guillaume - Martin Luther King Jr.
- Cameron Mitchell - Edwin Walker
- Jim Backus - Ted Dealey
- William Windom - Ferguson ("Fergie")
- Theodore Bikel - Georgi Bolshakov

== Production ==
James F. Kelly portrayed Robert F. Kennedy a total of seven times in different productions between 1981 and 1997. He also portrayed John F. Kennedy once. This was Jim Backus' last live project before his death.

== Reception ==
Variety called it "an ambiguous little indie mock documentary."

The Radio Times gave it a 2 out of 5 rating.

== Home media ==
Prince Jack was available on VHS, but it does not appear to have been released on DVD.

== See also ==
- Kennedy (TV miniseries)
- Hoover vs. The Kennedys
- The Kennedys (TV miniseries)
- Civil rights movement in popular culture
- Cultural depictions of John F. Kennedy
- Robert F. Kennedy in media
