= The Manhunter =

- Genre: Crime drama
- Written by: William Bast; Robert Bloch; Robert C. Dennis; Robert I. Holt; Robert W. Lenski; Sam Rolfe; Carey Wilber
- Directed by: Walter Grauman; Leslie H. Martinson
- Starring: Ken Howard; Hilary Thompson; Ford Rainey; Claudia Bryar; Robert J. Hogan
- Composer: Duane Tatro
- Country of origin: United States
- Original language: English
- No. of seasons: 1
- No. of episodes: 22 (+ pilot)

Production
- Executive producer: Quinn Martin
- Producer: Adrian Samish
- Running time: 60 mins. (approx)
- Production company: Quinn Martin Productions

Original release
- Network: CBS
- Release: September 11, 1974 – March 5, 1975

The Manhunter is an American crime drama that was part of CBS' lineup for the 1974–1975 television season. It stars Ken Howard as Dave Barrett, a 1930s-era ex-Marine and farmer from Idaho who pursues dangerous criminals as a bounty hunter. The series was produced by Quinn Martin.

== Synopsis ==
The series' premise - set during the 1930's US Great Depression era - has Dave going from his parents' farm in Idaho to other parts of the Western and North Central United States to solve crimes, after the death of his best friend during a bank robbery. Using a car which is well stocked with weapons, he hunts down men who were wanted by the law. The series also starred Hilary Thompson as Dave's sister Lizabeth Barret, Ford Rainey as his father, James, Claudia Bryar as his mother, Mary and Robert J. Hogan as Sheriff Paul Tate.

Among the series' guest stars were Michael Constantine, Joan Van Ark, Denver Pyle, Tom Skerritt, Leslie Nielsen, Sam Elliott, Dabney Coleman, Paul Carr, a pre-Star Wars Mark Hamill, Linda Marsh, Parley Baer, a pre-The Simpsons Jo Ann Harris and Barbara Rhoades. Already known for his portrayal of Thomas Jefferson in 1776, Howard would later become famous playing the main character on The White Shadow.

The Manhunter pilot episode was shown on February 26, 1974. It was then picked up as a regular series by CBS, with its first regular episode being shown 8 months later on September 11, 1974. Although being ranked 19th for the week that it premiered, the series was cancelled by CBS because of stiff competition from ABC's Get Christie Love! and NBC's Petrocelli with its last regular episode being shown on March 5, 1975. Reruns of the series were then shown until April.

== Episodes ==
=== Pilot: 1974 ===
No. overall	No. in season	Title	Directed by	Written by	Original release date
0	0	"Manhunter"	Walter Grauman	Sam Rolfe	February 26, 1974
Dave Barrett's (Ken Howard) former girlfriend is murdered. Barrett has become a bounty hunter after leaving the United States Marines. Barrett searches for the murderers. Guest stars: Gary Lockwood, Tim O'Connor, James Olson, Stefanie Powers, John Anderson, L.Q. Jones, Ford Rainey, Robert Hogan, R.G. Armstrong, Luke Askew, Marie Windsor, Ben Frank, Robert Patten, Mary Cross, Claudia Bryar, and Shirley O'Hara.

=== Season 1: 1974–75 ===
No.	Title	Directed by	Written by	Original release date
1	"The Ma Gantry Gang"	George McCowan	William Bast	September 11, 1974
2	"The Man Who Thought He Was Dillinger"	Unknown	Unknown	September 18, 1974
3	"The Baby-Faced Killers"	Leslie H. Martinson	Larry Alexander	September 25, 1974
4	"Death on the Run"	Leslie H. Martinson	Robert W. Lenski	October 2, 1974
5	"Trackdown"	Unknown	Unknown	October 9, 1974
6	"Terror From the Skies"	Unknown	Unknown	October 16, 1974
7	"The Doomsday Gang"	Unknown	Unknown	October 23, 1974
8	"The Deadly Brothers"	Unknown	Carey Wilber	October 30, 1974
9	"The Trunk Murders"	Allen Reisner	Robert Bloch	November 6, 1974
10	"Jackknife"	Unknown	Unknown	November 13, 1974
11	"The Carnival Story"	Unknown	R.W. Goodwin	November 20, 1974
12	"The Lodestar Ambush"	Unknown	Unknown	December 4, 1974
13	"A.W.O.L. to Kill"	Unknown	Unknown	December 11, 1974
14	"Flight to Nowhere"	Lawrence Dobkin	Robert I. Holt	December 18, 1974
15	"Web of Fear"	Unknown	Unknown	January 1, 1975
16	"Day of Execution"	Unknown	Unknown	January 15, 1975
17	"Man in a Cage"	Unknown	Unknown	January 22, 1975
18	"The Seventh Man"	Unknown	Unknown	January 29, 1975
19	"The Wrong Man"	Unknown	Unknown	February 5, 1975
20	"The Death Watch"	Unknown	Unknown	February 19, 1975
21	"To Kill a Tiger"	Unknown	Unknown	February 26, 1975
22	"Trial by Terror"	Unknown	Unknown	March 5, 1975
