= Barnaby Jones season 6 =

Barnaby Jones
- Season 6
- No. of episodes: 22

Release
- Original network: CBS
- Original release: September 15, 1977 – March 2, 1978

Season chronology
- ← Previous; Season 5 Next → Season 7

This is a list of episodes from the sixth season of Barnaby Jones.

== Broadcast history ==
The season originally aired Thursdays at 10:00-11:00 pm (EST).

== Episodes ==
No. overall	No. in season	Title	Directed by	Written by	Original release date
110	1	"Death Beat"	Michael Caffey	Larry Alexander	September 15, 1977
Barnaby investigates a vile TV reporter who fakes stories just to get big ratings, who ultimately turns to murder.
111	2	"The Mercenaries"	Walter Grauman	Robert Janes	September 22, 1977
J.R. is asked to find a man who hasn't been heard from since he became a mercenary.
112	3	"The Wife Beater"	Walter Grauman	Gerald Sanford	September 29, 1977
Barnaby investigates a vicious husband (Alan Fudge ) who beats his wife (Diane Baker).
113	4	"Yesterday's Terror"	Kenneth Gilbert	Robert Heverly	October 13, 1977
A woman with a shady past plots the murder of her blackmailer.
114	5	"The Damocles Gun"	Leo Penn	Gerald Sanford	October 20, 1977
The victim of a hit-and-run disappears as the sole witness calls an ambulance.
115	6	"Gang War"	Leslie H. Martinson	Jack V. Fogarty	October 27, 1977
A gang kidnaps J.R. and demands that he find out who killed the leader.
116	7	"Daughter of Evil"	Walter Grauman	Dick Nelson	November 3, 1977
Barnaby trails a jewel thief who's using call girls to distract his victims.
117	8	"The Captives"	Walter Grauman	Robert Sherman	November 10, 1977
A runaway housewife gets involved with a gang of thieves plotting an armored-car heist.
118	9	"The Reincarnation"	Walter Grauman	Michael Michaelian	November 17, 1977
Barnaby looks into a 20-year-old case hoping to find clues to an elderly doctor's death.
119	10	"Shadow of Fear"	Kenneth Gilbert	Margaret Armen	November 24, 1977
While on vacation, Betty meets a doctor who's being stalked by a trio of bikers.
120	11	"The Devil's Handmaiden"	Kenneth Gilbert	S : Robert C. Dennis; T : Mann Rubin	December 1, 1977
A girl begins to see future fatal accidents while exploring the occult.
121	12	"Prisoner of Deceit"	Leo Penn	Marc Brandell	December 15, 1977
Barnaby investigates the death of a reporter who was about to break a huge story.
122	13	"Deadly Homecoming"	Joseph Manduke	Arthur Bernard Lewis	December 22, 1977
A rancher believes his son's death was not an accident.
123	14	"Child of Danger"	Michael Caffey	Mann Rubin	December 29, 1977
A friend dupes Betty into caring for her son while she secretly tries to straighten out her life of crime.
124	15	"The Scapegoat"	Walter Grauman	William Keys	January 5, 1978
A lawyer plans to botch the defense of a murder suspect in order to protect the real killer - his own son.
125	16	"A Ransom in Diamonds"	Walter Grauman	Gerald Sanford	January 12, 1978
The manager of a jewelry-store steals a fortune in order to get a ransom for his kidnapped wife.
126	17	"Prime Target"	Michael Preece	Robert Janes	January 19, 1978
Barnaby believes that a parolee who served time for hit-and-run charges is connected to a year-old robbery case.
127	18	"Final Judgment"	Walter Grauman	Gerald Sanford	January 26, 1978
128	19	"Final Judgment"	Walter Grauman	Gerald Sanford	January 26, 1978
Barnaby comes to suspect that the wrong man was convicted in an 11-year-old kidnapping case.
129	20	"Uninvited Peril"	Robert Sherman	Robert Sherman	February 2, 1978
Betty searches for a couple's missing son, unaware that he's a psycho and escaped from a mental hospital.
130	21	"Terror on a Quiet Afternoon"	Walter Grauman	Jack V. Fogarty	February 9, 1978
In public and in front of witnesses, the heir to a fortune harasses and stalks the woman who jilted him and nobody except J.R. is willing to help.
131	22	"The Coronado Triangle"	Walter Grauman	S : Jon Christiansen & Brigitt Christiansen; T : Norman Jolley	March 2, 1978
The vanishing of boats and their crews may be caused by supernatural forces.
