= Barnaby Jones season 4 =

Barnaby Jones
- Season 4
- No. of episodes: 24

Release
- Original network: CBS
- Original release: September 19, 1975 – March 18, 1976

Season chronology
- ← Previous; Season 3 Next → Season 5

This is a list of episodes from the fourth season of Barnaby Jones. The season premiere was part of a two-part special that began on Cannon on September 17, 1975, and concluded on Barnaby Jones on September 19, 1975.

== Broadcast history ==
The season originally aired Fridays at 10:00-11:00 pm (EST) from September 19 to November 28, 1975, and Thursdays at 10:00-11:00 pm (EST) from December 4, 1975, to March 18, 1976.

== Episodes ==
No. overall	No. in season	Title	Directed by	Written by	Original release date
62	1	"The Deadly Conspiracy: Part 2"	Michael Caffey	Stephen Kandel	September 19, 1975
Barnaby teams up with Frank Cannon to investigate the suspicious activities of a large corporation that may include murder. Note: The story-line started in the Cannon episode "The Deadly Conspiracy: Part 1".
63	2	"Theater of Fear"	Walter Grauman	Robert W. Lenski	September 26, 1975
A former actress believes that someone is trying to foil her comeback.
64	3	"The Orchid Killer"	Walter Grauman	Michael Fisher	October 3, 1975
As soon as a man is released from a mental institute for the criminally insane, he's accused of killing one of the nurses.
65	4	"The Price of Terror"	Walter Grauman	William Keys	October 10, 1975
Barnaby probes the murder of a reporter who was investigating a Vietnam veteran's past.
66	5	"Honeymoon with Death"	Michael Caffey	Larry Alexander	October 17, 1975
Barnaby searches for a woman who disappeared on her wedding day.
67	6	"The Alpha-Bravo War"	Michael Caffey	S : Barry Oringer; T : Calvin Clements, Jr.	October 24, 1975
A test missile misfires, causing a death and raising Barnaby's suspicions.
68	7	"Flight to Danger"	Michael Caffey	Joel Murcott	October 31, 1975
Barnaby tracks a pair of heroin dealers who are using unsuspecting flight attendants as couriers.
69	8	"Double Vengeance"	Michael Caffey	Robert Sherman	November 7, 1975
A woman plots her revenge on the two men who conned her deceased father out of his land rights.
70	9	"Fatal Witness"	Walter Grauman	Calvin Clements, Jr.	November 14, 1975
Barnaby must vindicate a doctor accused of murder by a girl subject to hallucinations.
71	10	"Beware the Dog"	Walter Grauman	Michael Fisher	November 21, 1975
A dog is the prime suspect in the fatal mauling of a man whose stepson is the dog's owner.
72	11	"Blood Relations"	Walter Grauman	Dick Nelson	November 28, 1975
Barnaby is hired to replace a detective who was murdered while looking for a woman's biological mother.
73	12	"A Taste for Murder"	Walter Grauman	Robert W. Lenski	December 4, 1975
A young man's long-range plans clash with his girlfriend's personal ambition, leading them to commit murder out of greed.
74	13	"Final Burial"	Michael Caffey	S : Gerald Sanford; T : Robert Pirosh	December 11, 1975
A woman hires Barnaby to find her missing husband and the detective's investigation uncovers bigamy, blackmail and murder.
75	14	"Portrait of Evil"	Michael Caffey	Robert Sherman	December 18, 1975
An art collector's wife plots to steal one of his paintings, but her plan is complicated by her husband's death.
76	15	"Dead Heat"	Walter Grauman	Larry Alexander	January 1, 1976
A father willing to do anything for his son to be on the Olympic swimming team gets himself involved in a murder.
77	16	"The Lonely Victims"	Michael Caffey	Worley Thorne	January 8, 1976
A con man sets up robberies using information he gains from working women looking for love.
78	17	"Hostage"	Mel Damski	Gerald Sanford	January 15, 1976
A crazy man abducts Betty.
79	18	"Silent Vendetta"	Walter Grauman	William Keys	January 29, 1976
A former gangster goes into hiding to finish an indictment he'd been writing about the mob.
80	19	"Shadow of Guilt"	Chris Robinson	Terrance A. Sweeney, S.J.	February 5, 1976
Barnaby looks for a member of Chicano street-gang who is the only witness to a millionaire's death.
81	20	"Deadly Reunion"	Walter Grauman	Dick Nelson	February 12, 1976
Due to circumstantial evidence, Betty's old flame is a prime suspect in a restaurant tycoon's death.
82	21	"Dangerous Gambit"	Ernest Pintoff	Robert Sherman	February 26, 1976
While investigating a fatal automobile accident, Barnaby uncovers a complex scheme to defraud a bank.
83	22	"Wipeout"	Kenneth C. Gilbert	Michael Fisher	March 4, 1976
Barnaby probes the death of a girl who was a supposedly skilled surfer.
84	23	"The Eyes of Terror"	Allen Reisner	Larry Alexander	March 11, 1976
The residents of a small town being terrorized by a rapist falsely accuse a stutterer.
85	24	"The Stalking Horse"	Alf Kjellin	Robert W. Lenski	March 18, 1976
Barnaby poses as the brother of an eccentric millionaire he's hired to protect.
