= Barnaby Jones season 1 =

Barnaby Jones
- Season 1
- No. of episodes: 13

Release
- Original network: CBS
- Original release: January 28 – May 6, 1973

Season chronology
- Next → Season 2

This is a list of episodes from the first season of Barnaby Jones. The show was Buddy Ebsen's return to a regular television series after his stint as Jed Clampett on The Beverly Hillbillies.

== Broadcast history ==
The season originally Sundays at 9:30-10:30 pm (EST).

== Episodes ==
No. overall	No. in season	Title	Directed by	Written by	Original release date	Prod. code
1	1	"Requiem for a Son"	Walter Grauman	S : Adrian Samish; T : Edward Hume	January 28, 1973	9701
Detective Barnaby Jones (Buddy Ebsen) comes out of retirement to solve his son's murder with some help from fellow detective Frank Cannon (William Conrad). Bradford Dillman and Robert Hogan guest star.
2	2	"To Catch a Dead Man"	William Hale	Ben Masselink	February 4, 1973	9702
A sportsman's plans for a new life begin with murder. Darleen Carr, Janice Rule, William Shatner and Victoria Shaw guest star.
3	3	"Sunday: Doomsday"	Michael Caffey	Mort Fine & David Friedkin	February 25, 1973	9705
Barnaby engages in a game of cat-and-mouse with a murderer who blames him for his jail time. Gary Lockwood guest stars.
4	4	"The Murdering Class"	Ralph Senensky	Robert Sherman	March 4, 1973	9704
Barnaby investigates a murder at a prep-school. Geraldine Brooks guest stars.
5	5	"Perchance to Kill"	Walter Grauman	Robert Dennis	March 11, 1973	9706
An affair leads to an accidental murder while Barnaby deals with an incompetent police lieutenant. Sharon Acker, Eric Braeden, and Richard Hatch guest star.
6	6	"The Loose Connection"	Virgil W. Vogel	Edward J. Lakso	March 18, 1973	9707
Barnaby is used to smuggle narcotics. Christine Belford, Lloyd Bochner, and Nico Minardos guest star.
7	7	"Murder in the Doll's House"	Lawrence Dobkin	Ben Masselink	March 25, 1973	9708
Barnaby matches wits with a debonair killer. Whit Bissell, Jack Cassidy, Cathy Lee Crosby, Anne Francis, Phillip Pine, and Estelle Winwood guest star.
8	8	"Sing a Song of Murder"	Virgil W. Vogel	Martin Roth & Lou Shaw	April 1, 1973	9709
The managers of a rock music star, whom they think drowned in his pool, cash in on his "tragedy". Jackie Coogan, Arlene Golonka, and Judy Strangis guest star.
9	9	"See Some Evil...Do Some Evil"	Lawrence Dobkin	George F. Slavin	April 8, 1973	9710
A blackmailer and murderer pretends to be blind. Marlyn Mason, Roddy McDowell, and Reni Santoni guest star.
10	10	"Murder-Go-Round"	Marc Daniels	Steve Fisher	April 15, 1973	9703
It's one killing after another as Barnaby investigates a hit-and-run accident while wealthy townspeople plot his murder. Claude Akins, Dabbs Greer, Geoffrey Lewis, and Neva Patterson guest star.
11	11	"To Denise, with Love and Murder"	Ralph Senensky	Robert C. Dennis	April 22, 1973	9711
A philanderer murders his mistress. Bill Bixby guest stars.
12	12	"A Little Glory, A Little Death"	Robert Day	Shirl Hendryx	April 29, 1973	9712
A blackmailing actress gets pushed off a cliff. Meg Foster and Barry Sullivan guest star.
13	13	"Twenty Million Alibis"	Michael Caffey	Robert Hamner	May 6, 1973	9713
A jewel thief writing his memoirs accidentally kills a butler while making off with a diamond necklace. Bert Freed, Peter Haskell, and Marie Windsor guest star.
