= James F. Kelly =

American actor

James F. Kelly is an American actor best known for playing Robert F. Kennedy (whom Kelly closely resembles). Between the years 1981 and 1997, he played RFK in seven different productions. He also portrayed John F. Kennedy in the 1992 television miniseries Sinatra.

== Appearances as Robert F. Kennedy ==
- Jacqueline Bouvier Kennedy - 1981 film
- Prince Jack - 1985 film
- J. Edgar Hoover (TV-film) - 1987 made-for-television film
- LBJ: The Early Years - 1987 made-for-television film
- Onassis: The Richest Man in the World - 1988 made-for-television film
- Marilyn & Bobby: Her Final Affair - 1993 made-for-television film
- Dark Skies - 1996-97 Science fiction television series
