= Cannon season 4 =

Cannon
- Season 4
- No. of episodes: 24

Release
- Original network: CBS
- Original release: September 11, 1974 – April 2, 1975

Season chronology
- ← Previous; Season 3 Next → Season 5

This is a list of episodes from the fourth season of Cannon.

== Broadcast history ==
The season originally aired Wednesdays at 9:00-10:00 pm (EST)

== Episodes ==
No. overall	No. in season	Title	Directed by	Written by	Original release date
74	1	"Kelly's Song"	William Wiard	S.S. Schweitzer	September 11, 1974
A former prostitute reluctantly goes back to her old life to help Cannon capture a vice-ring operator.
75	2	"The Hit Man"	William Wiard	Robert Heverly	September 18, 1974
A hit man who looks just like Cannon is hired to execute a bishop.
76	3	"Voice from the Grave"	William Wiard	Robert Hamner	September 25, 1974
Cannon assists a retired detective with an unsolved homicide case.
77	4	"Lady in Red"	William Wiard	Max Hodge	October 2, 1974
Cannon must ensure the safe travel of a woman carrying valuable securities.
78	5	"The Deadly Trail"	George McCowan	Calvin Clements	October 16, 1974
A tyrannical industrialist hires Cannon to find the daughter he gave up for adoption when she was born.
79	6	"The Exchange"	George McCowan	Jackson Gillis	October 23, 1974
An ex-con seeks revenge against the police officers who were involved in the shooting of his brother during a holdup.
80	7	"The Avenger"	Corey Allen	Robert Sherman	October 30, 1974
Cannon is out to avenge the murder of his policeman friend.
81	8	"A Killing in the Family"	George McCowan	Larry Alexander	November 6, 1974
Cannon is hired to investigate a policy-holder's death, then dismissed when he finds evidence of murder.
82	9	"Flashpoint"	William Wiard	Robert Heverly	November 13, 1974
Cannon assists a public defender clear his client who's charged with rape and murder.
83	10	"The Man Who Couldn't Forget"	George McCowan	Robert I. Holt	November 20, 1974
A Dutchman is searching for a suspected Nazi war criminal.
84	11	"The Sounds of Silence"	George McCowan	T : Anthony Spinner; S/T : Stephen Kandel	December 4, 1974
An engaged woman hires Cannon to find her fiance, vanished three weeks before a wedding.
85	12	"The Prisoner"	William Wiard	Norman Hudis	December 11, 1974
An ex-Army captain is plotting to kill a released prisoner of war who knows some unsettling facts about the officer's actions in Vietnam.
86	13	"Daddy's Little Girl"	Leslie H. Martinson	Larry Alexander	December 18, 1974
Cannon faces the consequences of killing a hit man who was going to marry a gangster's daughter.
87	14	"The Conspirators"	George McCowan	Margaret Armen	January 1, 1975
Cannon goes to a small town in Texas to probe a woman's disappearance.
88	15	"Coffin Corner"	George McCowan	S : Rick Husky; T : Robert I. Holt	January 15, 1975
An ex-football player asks Cannon to protect him from a pair of killers.
89	16	"Perfect Fit for a Frame"	William Wiard	Robert Hamner	January 22, 1975
A woman is being hunted by her vengeful husband because she tried to kill him.
90	17	"Killer on the Hill"	Harry Falk	Carey Wilber	January 29, 1975
A man who despises a congressman is framed for his attempted murder.
91	18	"Missing at FL307"	William Wiard	Carey Wilber	February 5, 1975
An ex-con boards a plane, then disappears before it lands.
92	19	"The Set Up"	George McCowan	Robert Sherman	February 12, 1975
In a case of mistaken identity, Cannon is stalked by killers looking for a lawyer who looks just like the detective.
93	20	"The Investigator"	George McCowan	Robert C. Dennis	February 26, 1975
A mayor hires Cannon to investigate the death of a reporter who was going to expose corruption within the police.
94	21	"Lady on the Run"	George McCowan	Gerald Sanford	March 5, 1975
Cannon trails a rich woman who first ran from her husband, then from her murderous boyfriend.
95	22	"Vengeance"	Alf Kjellin	Robert I. Holt	March 12, 1975
After hiring a hit man to end his life, an ex-con changes his mind and asks Cannon to stop the hit man before it's too late.
96	23	"Tomorrow Ends at Noon"	William Wiard	Robert C. Dennis	March 19, 1975
Terrorists kidnap a diplomat's daughter and threaten to kill her unless their cohorts are released from jail.
97	24	"Search and Destroy"	Edward M. Abroms	S : Robert Mitchell & Esther Mitchell; T : Stephen Kandel	April 2, 1975
Cannon looks for a runaway girl, unaware that she saw her aunt participate in a murder.
