= Robert Hogan (actor) =

American actor (1933–2021)

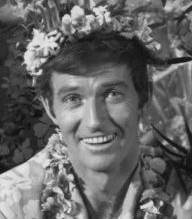
- Hogan in an unsold television pilot (1970)
- Born: Robert Joseph Hogan; September 28, 1933; New York City, U.S.
- Died: May 27, 2021 (aged 87); Maine, U.S.
- Occupation: Actor
- Years active: 1961–2019
- Spouses: Sharon Lynn Harper (m. 1957; div. 1982) Mary Barbera (m. 1983)
- Children: 3

Robert Joseph Hogan (September 28, 1933 – May 27, 2021) was an American actor who worked mainly in television. While he was never a member of the main cast of a critically successful television series, he portrayed numerous recurring characters on programs such as Alice; Another World; As the World Turns; Days of Our Lives; Deadline; General Hospital; Law & Order; Murder, She Wrote; One Life to Live; Operation Petticoat; Peyton Place; The Wire, and many others. His guest star appearances on television series encompassed more than 90 shows over five decades. The character of US Army Air Forces Colonel Robert Hogan on Hogan's Heroes (portrayed by Bob Crane) was named after him by friend and series creator Bernard Fein.

== Early years ==
Hogan was born in Jamaica, Queens, New York on September 28, 1933. He served in the U.S. Army during the Korean War, and after being honorably discharged, studied engineering at New York University. While he was a student, one of Hogan's professors suggested that he take an aptitude test to find the right career path, and the test results steered Hogan to the arts. Subsequently, Hogan went on to study at the American Academy of Dramatic Arts.

== Career ==
=== Early: 1961–1979 ===
Hogan began his acting career in theater, making his professional debut as Elliot in the original 1961 Off-Broadway production of Michael Shurtleff's Call Me by My Rightful Name with Robert Duvall and Joan Hackett. He relocated to Los Angeles shortly thereafter to pursue a career in television and film. Soon after his arrival, he appeared as a guest star in episodes of 77 Sunset Strip and Cheyenne in 1961. He appeared in guest roles throughout the 1960s in television series such as Batman; Bonanza; Fair Exchange; Gomer Pyle, U.S.M.C.; Hawaiian Eye; I Dream of Jeannie; Hogan's Heroes; Twelve O'Clock High; and The Twilight Zone, among others. He appeared in two films: FBI Code 98 and Greenwich Village Story. In 1967, he was cast as Reverend Tom Winter on the soap opera Peyton Place, whom he portrayed for two seasons.

In 1969, Hogan joined the cast of Days of Our Lives for a short time, portraying the character of Will Austin; in 1970, he returned to the show in the recurring role of Scott Banning Sr., which he held for two years. He continued to be active as a guest actor in television series throughout the 1970s, including The F.B.I., Gunsmoke, Hawaii Five-O, M*A*S*H, Mission: Impossible, Mork & Mindy, The Mary Tyler Moore Show, The Rockford Files, and Barnaby Jones, among others. From 1974 to 1975, he was in the main cast of the short-lived series The Manhunter as Sheriff Paul Tate. He also played the recurring characters of Burt Marshall on General Hospital (1973), LCDR Sam Haller on Operation Petticoat (1978–1979), and Greg Stemple on Alice (1977–1982). He also appeared in several television movies, including Heatwave! (1974) and Roll, Freddy, Roll! (1974), and on the big screen as Jake Lingle in The Lady in Red (1979).

=== Middle: 1980–1999 ===
Hogan continued an active television career throughout the 1980s, appearing as a guest actor on such series as Airwolf, Barnaby Jones, The Incredible Hulk, Knight Rider, Laverne & Shirley, Magnum, P.I., Quincy M.E., Hill Street Blues, St. Elsewhere, T.J. Hooker, and Murder, She Wrote, among others. He had a recurring role as Vince McKinnon on Another World (1987–1989, 1991). He also appeared in a number of television movies including Natalie Wood's final completed film The Memory of Eva Ryker (1980), and in the role of John F. Kennedy in the film Prince Jack (1985).

During the 1990s, Hogan returned to working in the theater. He made his Broadway debut in November 1989, as Capt. Matthew A. Markinson in the original production of Aaron Sorkin's A Few Good Men, and he remained with the show for more than a year. He returned to Broadway in 1992 to portray the roles of the Ghost and the Player King in William Shakespeare's Hamlet. He also appeared in numerous Off-Broadway productions, including Neal Bell's On the Bum (1992), Mark R. Shapiro's The Shattering (1996), Frank Pugliese's Hope is the Thing with Feathers (1998), William Kennedy's premiere of Grand View and John Logan's Never the Sinner (1998). For his performance in the latter play he won an Outer Critics Circle Award.

Having refocused his career to theater, Hogan made fewer television appearances during the 1990s. However, he portrayed the recurring roles of L.J. McDermott on As the World Turns (1991–1992) and Charles Briggs on One Life to Live (1995–1998, 2000). He also appeared as a guest actor on the shows Remember WENN (1997), Cosby (1997), and Now and Again (1999), and in feature films such as Species II (1998) and Advice from a Caterpillar (1999).

=== Later: 2000–2019 ===
Hogan continued to remain active in television, film, and theatre. He notably portrayed the recurring roles of Phil Carbone on Deadline (2000), Louis Sobotka on The Wire (2003), and Judge Hugo Bright on Law & Order (2003–2006). He appeared in the films Maze (2000), Cupid & Cate (2000), Brooklyn Sonnet (2000), The Sleepy Time Gal (2001), Sweet Land (2005), Day Zero (2007), Universal Signs (2008), and Welcome to Academia (2009). He also appeared Off-Broadway in the plays Further Than the Furthest Thing (2002), Boy (2004), The Accomplices (2007), and Mourning Becomes Electra (2009).

Hogan's appearance in a 1965 episode of The F.B.I. titled "All the Streets Are Silent" was briefly featured during a scene in Quentin Tarantino's Once Upon a Time in Hollywood in 2019.

== Personal life and death ==
In 1957, Hogan married Sharon Harper; they had three children together before divorcing in 1982. In 1983, Hogan married Mary Barbera, and they remained married until his death.

Hogan was diagnosed with Alzheimer's disease in 2013. He died from complications of pneumonia at his home in Maine on May 27, 2021, aged 87.

== Filmography ==
Year	Title	Role	Notes
1962	FBI Code 98	Timothy Farrell	
1963	Greenwich Village Story	Brian	
1964	Gunsmoke	Danny Adams	Season 10, Episode 3; "Old Man"
1964	The Twilight Zone	Robert Blake	Season 5, Episode 21; "Spur of the Moment"
1965	The F.B.I.		Season 1, Episode 11; "All the Streets Are Silent"
1965	Hogan's Heroes	Braden	Season 1, Episode 15; "Reservations Are Required"
1966	Batman	Paul Diamante	Season 1, Episode 7; "Instant Freeze" and Season 1, Episode 8; "Rats Like Cheese" (two-part story arc)
1967–1969	Peyton Place	Reverend Tom Winter	2 seasons; episodes 419–514
1969	Bonanza	Toby	Season 10, Episode 30; "A Ride in the Sun"
1969	Days of Our Lives	Will Austin	
1970	Land of the Giants	Brady	Season 2, Episode 23; "The Marionettes"
1970	I Dream of Jeannie	Commander Wingate	Season 5, Episode 17; "The Solid Gold Jeannie"
1970–1971	Days of Our Lives	Scott Banning Sr.	
1972	The Mary Tyler Moore Show	Jack Stoneham	Season 3, Episode 1; "The Good-Time News"
1973	Barnaby Jones	Reed Carpenter	Season 1, Episode 1; "Requiem for a Son"
1973	General Hospital	Burt Marshall	Recurring
1973	Westworld	Ed Wren	Uncredited
1974	The Memory of Us	John	
1974	Heatwave!	Harry Powers	
1974	The Manhunter	Sheriff Paul Tate	
1974	Roll, Freddy, Roll!	Don Talbert	
1976	M*A*S*H	Smilin' Jack Mitchell	Season 4, Episode 22; "Smilin' Jack"
1976	Once an Eagle	Ben Krisler	
1977	Quinn Martin's Tales of the Unexpected		Season 1, Episode 8; "No Way Out"
1977	The Oregon Trail	Ben Jarvis	Season 1, Episode 7; "Return From Death"
1977–1982	Alice	Greg Stemple	Recurring
1978	The Eddie Capra Mysteries	Paul Crowley	Pilot: "Nightmare at Pendragon Castle"
1978–1979	Operation Petticoat	Lt. Commander Sam Haller	Recurring
1979	The Lady in Red	Jake Lingle	
1980	The Memory of Eva Ryker	J.H. Martin	
1984–1989	Murder, She Wrote	Various	
1985	Prince Jack	Jack	
1986	Hamburger: The Motion Picture	Russell's Father	
1987–1989, 1991	Another World	Vince McKinnon	
1991–1992	As the World Turns	L.J. McDermott	Recurring
1995–1998	One Life to Live	Charles Briggs	Recurring
1998	Species II	Pentagon Personnel	
1998	Blue Christmas	Svelte	
1999	Advice from a Caterpillar	Diner Husband	
2000	One Life to Live	Charles Briggs	
2000	Maze	Lyle's father	
2000	Brooklyn Sonnet	John O'Hagen	
2000	Deadline	Phil Carbone	Recurring
2001	The Sleepy Time Gal	Rebecca's adoptive father	
2003	The Wire	Louis Sobotka	4 Episodes
1991–2006	Law & Order	Patrick Monahan, Ted Parker, Agent Carlin, Captain Walder, Judge Albert Scholl, Judge Hugo Bright	9 episodes
2005	Sweet Land	Old Olaf	
2007	Day Zero	Senior Partner	
2008	Universal Signs	Mr. Callahan	
2009	Welcome to Academia	Kronsky	
2013	Trust, Greed, Bullets & Bourbon	Franky	
2014	A Good Marriage	Minister	
2016	Youth in Oregon	Peter	
