= The Prisoner (2013 film) =

- Directed by: Mahmoud Shoolizadeh
- Written by: Sharon Y. Cobb
- Produced by: Kim Murray
- Starring: Paul Bathen; Ryan Michael Murray; Scott J. Smith
- Cinematography: Peter Stahl
- Edited by: Mahmoud Shoolizadeh
- Release date: June 2013
- Running time: 20 minutes
- Country: United States
- Language: English

The Prisoner is a short fiction film directed by Mahmoud Shoolizadeh, and written by Sharon Y. Cobb in 2013, based on a short story that was written by Mahmoud Shoolizadeh. It has participated in several major international film festivals, including the Montreal World Film Festival, and East Lansing Film Festival. Although the movie is based in Florida, it was totally shot in Coastal Georgia. It won Best Short Film Award and Best Supporting Actor Award at Hollywood CineRocKom International Film Festival, and won Honorable Mention Jury Award at Indie Fest USA International Film Festival. It also became a nominee for Best Director at Hollywood CineRocKom International film festival as well as Best Lead Actor and Best Supporting Actor at Red Dirt International Film Festival The film has been discussed in local Newspapers and Magazines.

== Plot ==
Sonny and Dub once shared a cell together. Now Sonny is a free man keeping his life as simple and care free as possible. While Dub is on Death Row and sentenced to be executed in a matter of days, Sonny comes to visit Dub one last time. Dub has a last request - a dying request that hopes to entrust Sonny with.

== Awards and nominations ==
- Award for Best short fiction film at Hollywood Cinerockom International Film Festival, October 2013
- Award for Best Supporting Actor at Hollywood Cinerockom International Film Festival, October 2013
- Honorable Mention Jury Award at Indie Fest USA International Film Festival, October 2013
- Nomination for the Best Lead Actor at Red Dirt International Film Festival, OK, USA, Oct 2013
- Nomination for the Best Supporting Lead Actor at Red Dirt International Film Festival, OK, USA, Oct 2013
