= The Prisoners (Goya) =

Print series by Francisco Goya

The Prisoners is a series of three etchings by Francisco de Goya, depicting imprisoned men with indistinct faces, bound with leg irons in stress positions. The prints are not dated, but they are believed to have been made between 1810 and 1815, around the time Goya started his print series The Disasters of War. Political considerations made it impossible for Goya to publish the prints during his lifetime.

Although they do not share the format, paper, or style of The Disasters of War, similarities of the etching technique date them to a similar period. Copies of the three engravings, together with a fourth Goya print The Colossus were kept together in an album of working impressions of The Disasters of War owned by Goya's friend Juan Agustín Ceán Bermúdez, with the three prints of The Prisoners prints glued in rather than bound with the others. After Ceán Bermúdez died in 1829, the album was later in the collection of Tomás Harris and since 1975 it has been held by the British Museum in London. These prints have titles added by Goya himself in pencil, but individual prints are sometimes known as The Little Prisoner. Goya's titles for the three etchings are criticisms of judicial torture.

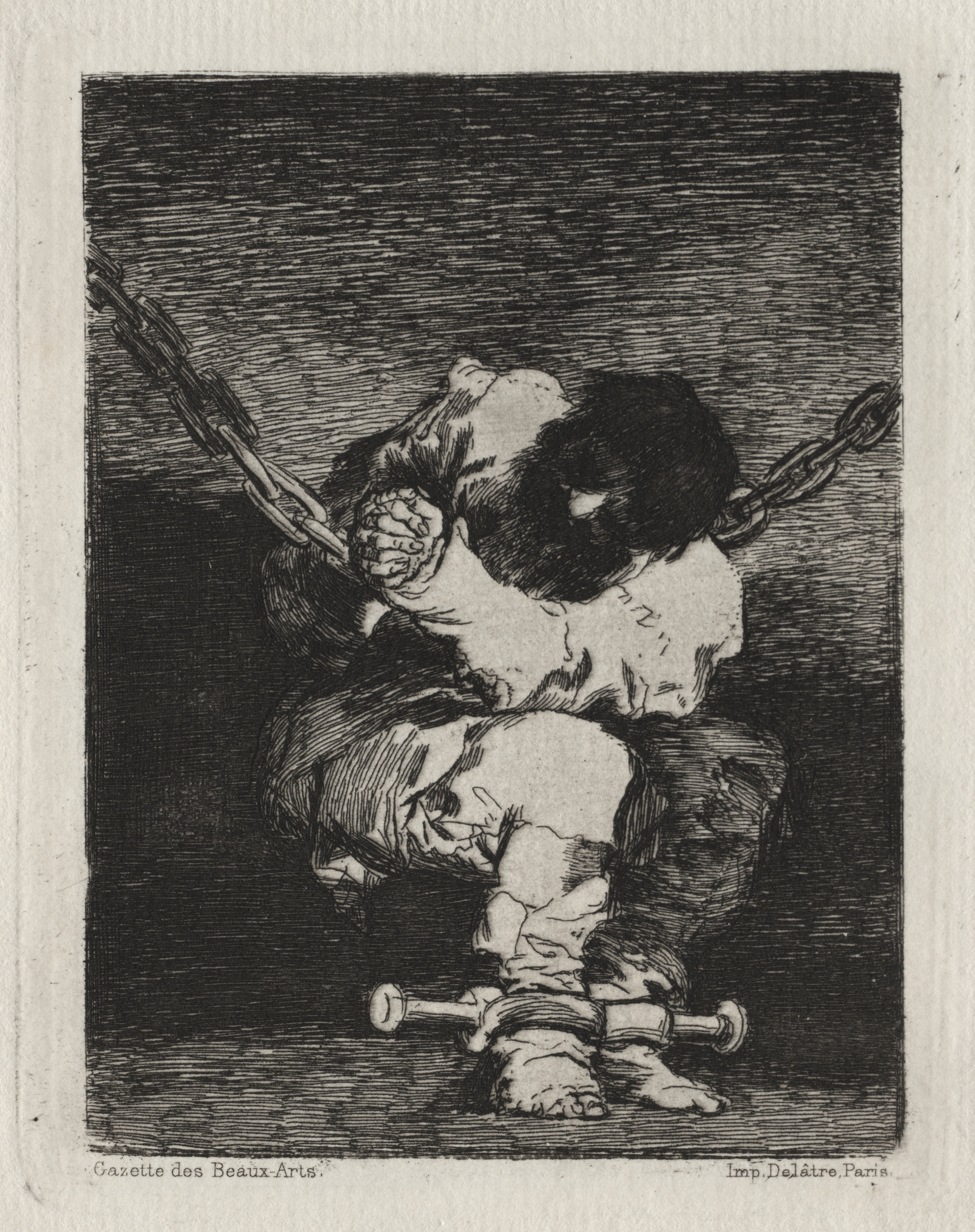
Tan bárbara la seguridad como el delito ("The custody is as barbarous as the crime")

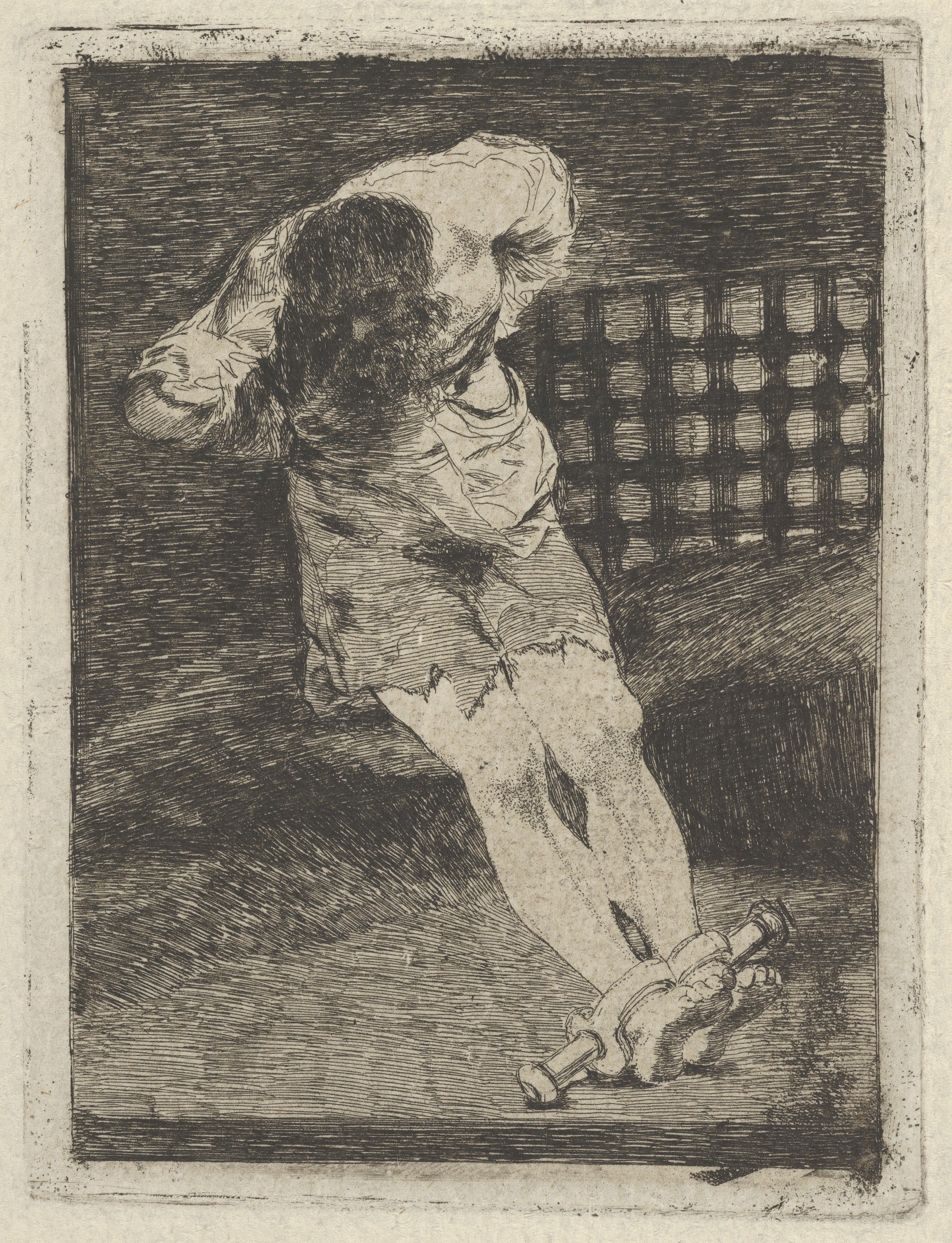
La seguridad de un reo no exige tormento ("The custody of a criminal does not call for torture")

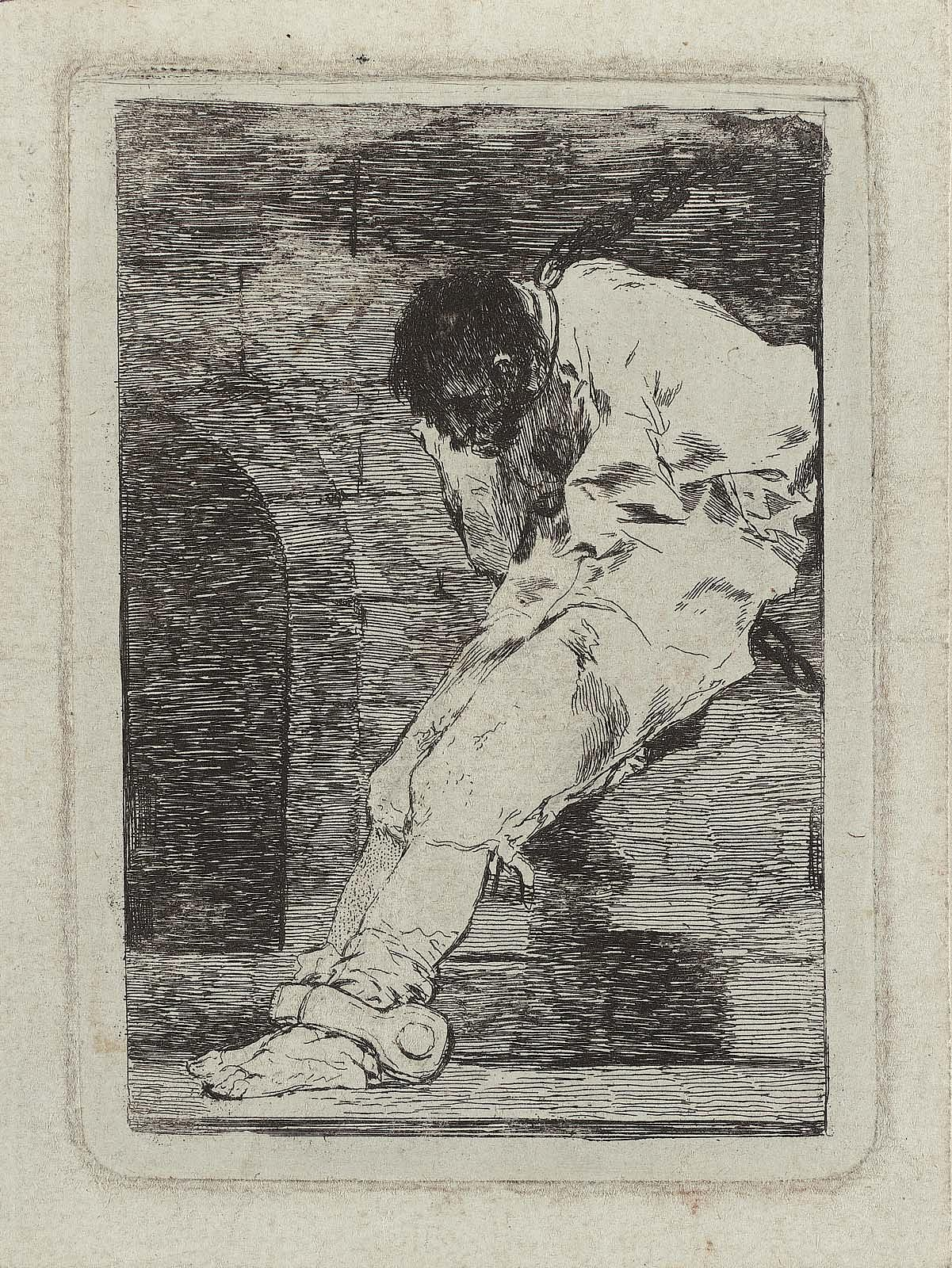
Si es delincuente que muera presto ("If he is guilty, let him die quickly")

Tan bárbara la seguridad como el delito ("The custody is as barbarous as the crime") shows a prisoner in ragged clothes with his hair and beard overgrown, shackled to heavy chains in a squatting position, with his hands clasped as if begging or praying.

La seguridad del reo no exige tormento ("The custody of a criminal does not call for torture") shows a man chained in an unnatural diagonal position across the frame, beside a wall with a grate to the right. He is bent double and leaning to the left, with his hands bound behind his back, and only his heels resting on the floor. His tattered trousers are torn off above the knee.

Si es delincuente que muera presto ("If he is guilty, let him die quickly") shows a man slumped forward to the right of an arched opening. A collar around his neck is held up by a chain, and his hands are chained behind his back, but his feet are held forward by heavy irons.

The Museo del Prado in Madrid holds three of Goya's ink and gouache preparatory drawings (a chained prisoner viewed from the front, a chained prisoner in profile, and a prisoner chained in a seated position), with others in various other museums, including the Museum of Fine Arts, Boston and the Musée Bonnat in Bayonne. Goya may have drawn some inspiration from earlier engravings of prisons, including Piranesi's Carceri d'invenzione (Imaginary Prisons).

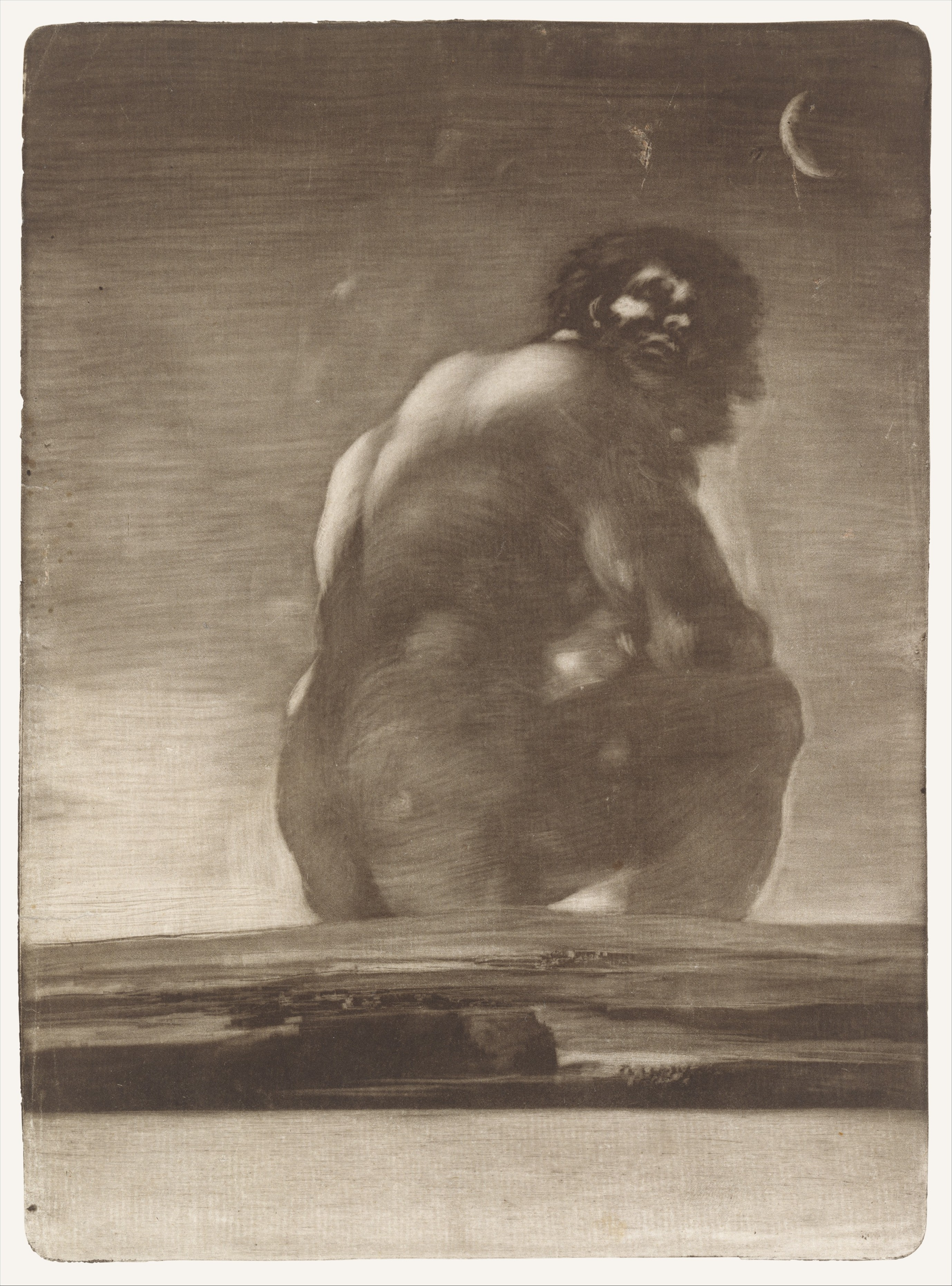
Goya, The Colossus, c.1818

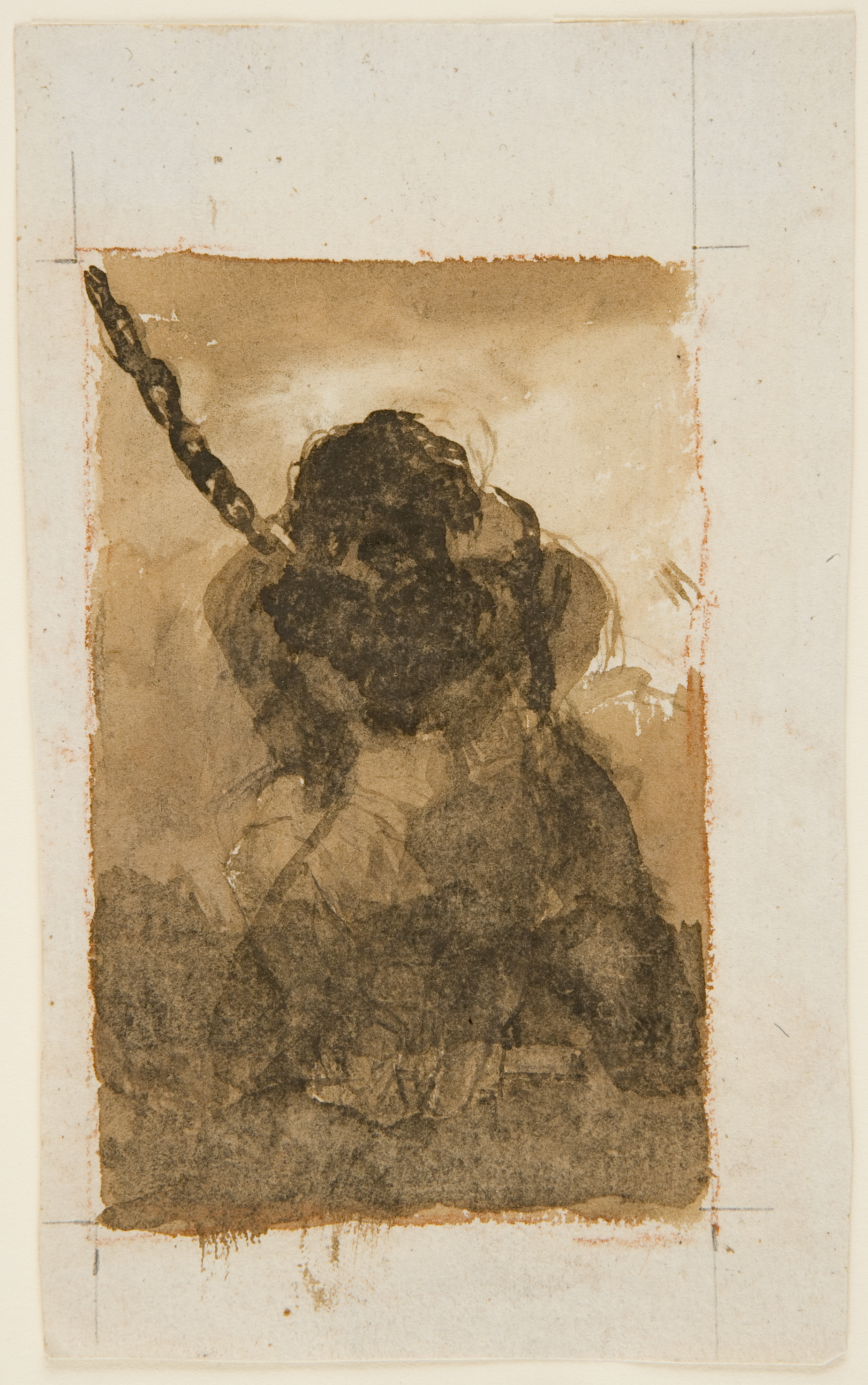
Silueta de prisionero encadenado de frente, Prado

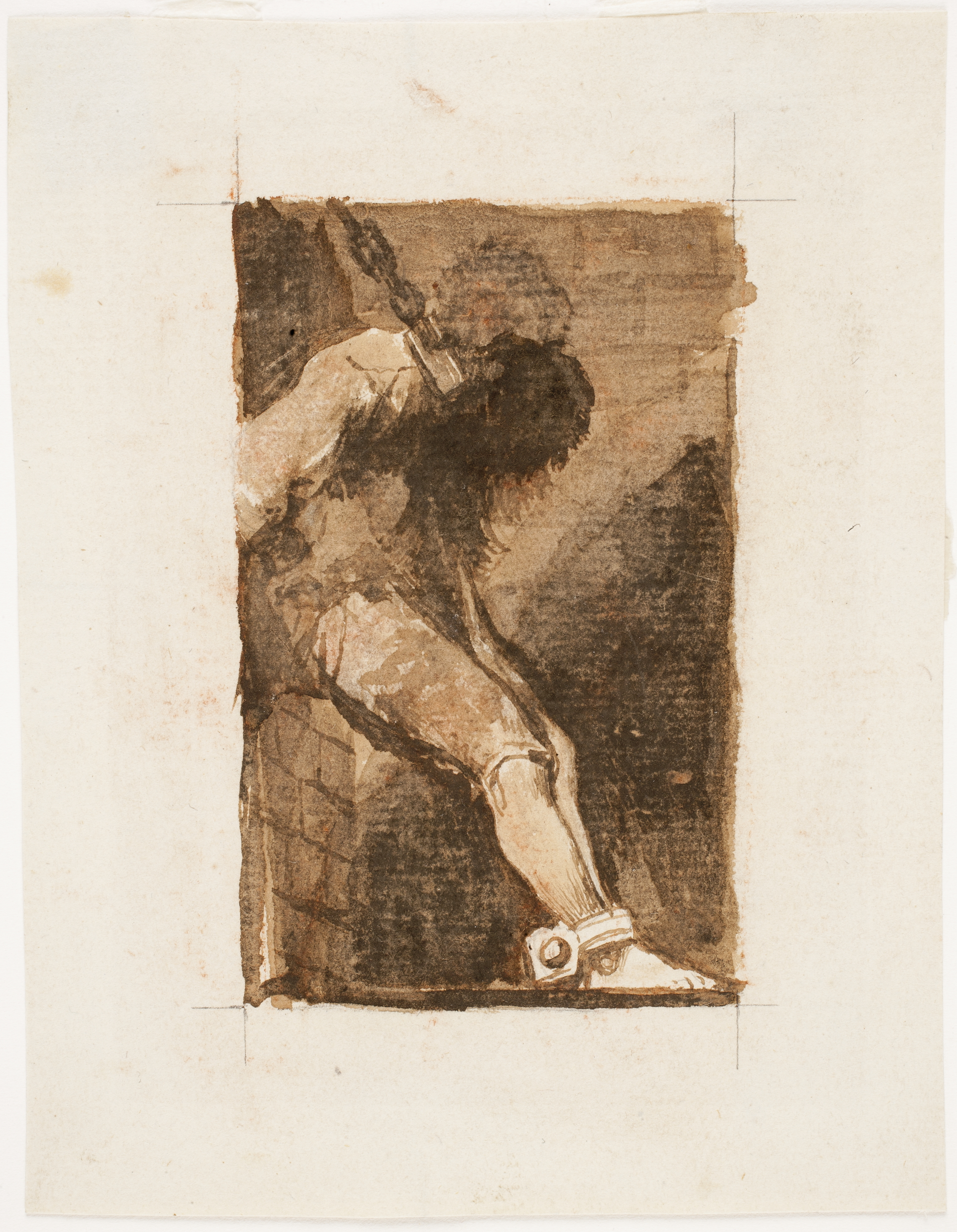
Prisionero encadenado, sentado de perfil a la izquierda, Prado

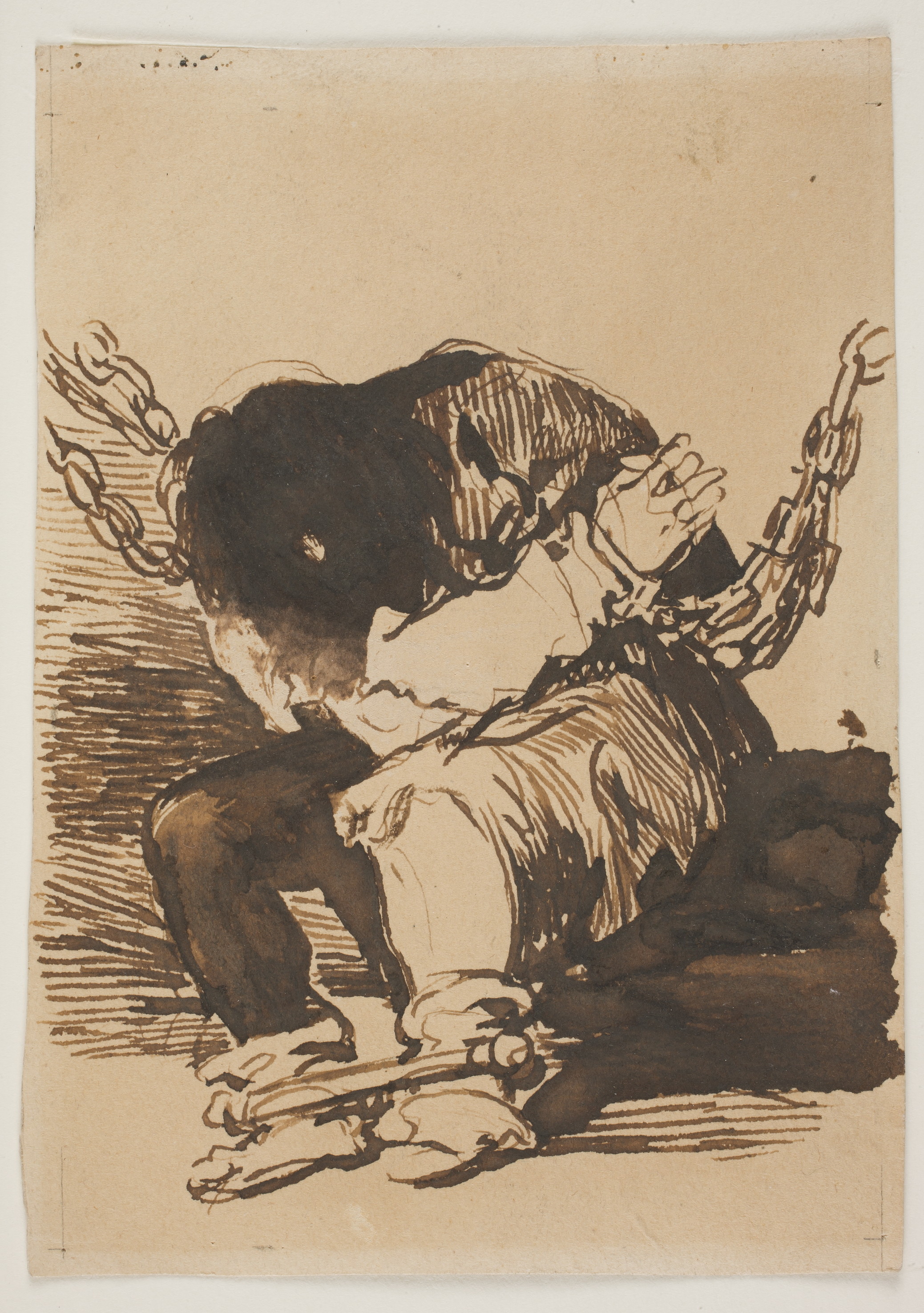
Prisionero encadenado, sentado, Prado

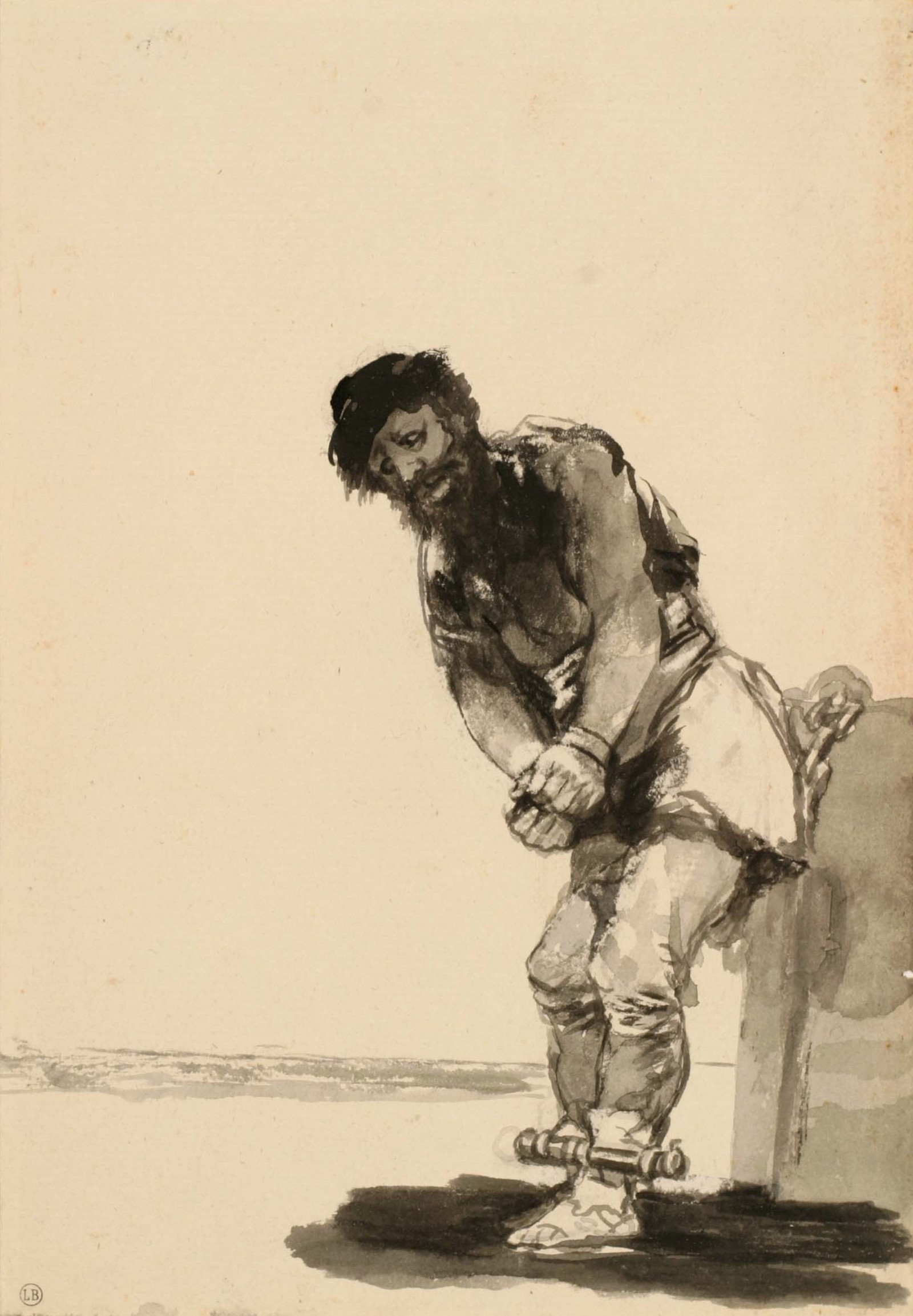
Ink wash drawing of a chained prisoner, in the Musée Bonnat, Bayonne
