= Cannon season 2 =

Cannon
- Season 2
- No. of episodes: 24

Release
- Original network: CBS
- Original release: September 13, 1972 – March 21, 1973

Season chronology
- ← Previous; Season 1 Next → Season 3

This is a list of episodes from the second season of Cannon.

== Broadcast history ==
The season originally aired Wednesdays at 10:00-11:00 pm (EST).

== Episodes ==
No. overall	No. in season	Title	Directed by	Written by	Original release date
25	1	"Bad Cats and Sudden Death"	Philip Leacock	Robert Lewin	September 13, 1972
Cannon attempts to clear a friend on murder charges, but the more he uncovers, the worse it looks.
26	2	"Sky Above, Death Below"	George McCowan	Hal Sitowitz	September 20, 1972
Cannon's only witness to a murder is a fugitive draft dodger.
27	3	"Bitter Legion"	Michael O'Herlihy	George Bellak	September 27, 1972
Cannon plays dirty to keep a Vietnam veteran on the straight and narrow.
28	4	"That Was No Lady"	George McCowan	Dick Nelson	October 4, 1972
A lawyer puts her life at stake when she defends suspects in a robbery.
29	5	"Stakeout"	Leo Penn	Harold Gast	October 11, 1972
A crooked ex-cop's daughter is set up in a robbery - and all the witnesses and police forensic scientists and detectives refuse to cooperate.
30	6	"The Predators"	George McCowan	Arthur Heinemann	October 18, 1972
A coyote trap connects a dead man to smugglers.
31	7	"A Long Way Down"	George McCowan	Stephen Kandel	October 25, 1972
Cannon searches a hospital for clues when drugs are stolen and a murder is committed.
32	8	"The Rip Off"	George McCowan	Douglas Day Stewart	November 1, 1972
When Cannon's apartment is burglarized, his pursuit of the thief leads him to discover thefts at an airport.
33	9	"Child of Fear"	David Lowell Rich	Robert W. Lenski	November 15, 1972
A wealthy rancher is missing, and his foolish wife allows her private security force to have free rein over her ranch.
34	10	"The Shadow Man"	Robert Douglas	Robert Lewin	November 22, 1972
A woman says her husband fell off a cliff, but the body is gone - along with a fortune in bonds.
35	11	"Hear No Evil"	Charles S. Dubin	Robert W. Lenski	November 29, 1972
Cannon investigates when a convicted wiretapper seems to have taken up blackmailing.
36	12	"The Endangered Species"	Robert Douglas	Del Reisman	December 13, 1972
A friend of Cannon's is charged with murder - and the real killer is his attorney.
37	13	"Nobody Beats the House"	Herbert Hirschman	Meyer Dolinsky	December 20, 1972
A gambler in debt is given an ultimatum: pay or die.
38	14	"Hard Rock Roller Coaster"	Charles S. Dubin	S : Bill S. Ballinger; T : Meyer Dolinsky	January 3, 1973
A smuggler (Fritz Weaver) uses Cannon to find a cache of diamonds.
39	15	"The Dead Samaritan"	Jerry Jameson	S : Robert Van Scoyk; T : Stephen Kandel	January 10, 1973
In a faux pas episode, a good Samaritan saves a woman from which has the appearance of an assault in broad daylight in front of 11-15 witnesses (Cannon claims there were only 4), and the Samaritan is charged with murder.
40	16	"Death of a Stone Seahorse"	William Wiard	Anthony Lawrence	January 17, 1973
A murderer attempts to frame his mentally-unstable sister for his crime.
41	17	"Moving Target"	Lawrence Dobkin	Worley Thorne	January 31, 1973
An author is targeted for murder when he starts writing a fake autobiography of a billionaire.
42	18	"Murder for Murder"	Herschel Daugherty	Arthur Heinemann	February 7, 1973
Cannon follows a teacher bent on revenge after his daughter dies at a jet-set party.
43	19	"To Ride a Tiger"	Virgil W. Vogel	Robert W. Lenski	February 14, 1973
An ex-con's lawyer disappears after winning a case.
44	20	"Prisoners"	Charles S. Dubin	Robert Lewin	February 21, 1973
A young man's plot to extort money from his father backfires.
45	21	"The Seventh Grave"	John Badham	E. Arthur Kean	February 28, 1973
Cannon's search for a murderer is clouded by a lab worker altering the evidence.
46	22	"Catch Me If You Can"	William Hale	Douglas Day Stewart	March 7, 1973
A psychopathic killer asks Cannon for help.
47	23	"Press Pass to the Slammer"	Leo Penn	Meyer Dolinsky	March 14, 1973
Cannon must solve a murder before a columnist is sent to prison.
48	24	"Deadly Heritage"	Seymour Robbie	Robert Lewin	March 21, 1973
A friend of Cannon's searches for her stepson, who had been abandoned by her husband years ago.
