= Walter Grauman =

American theatre and film director

- Born: Walter E. Grauman; March 17, 1922; Milwaukee, Wisconsin, United States
- Died: March 20, 2015 (aged 93); Los Angeles, California, United States
- Resting place: Westwood Village Memorial Park Cemetery
- Occupations: Theatre director, film director, television director
- Spouses: Suzanne Greenstone (m. 1949; died 1974) Joan Taylor (m. 1976; div. 1980) Margaret (Peggy) Parker (m. 1989)
- Children: 2

Walter E. Grauman (March 17, 1922 – March 20, 2015) was an American director of stage shows, films and television shows.

== Early life ==
Grauman was born in Milwaukee, Wisconsin to Jacob and Irene Grauman, both children of German immigrants who married after settling in the United States. His father, Jacob Grauman, was president of a film distributing company.

In his early years, Grauman lived in Shorewood, Wisconsin, a suburb of Milwaukee, and later moved to Arizona where he attended the University of Arizona. He served for four years in the United States Army Air Forces flying 56 combat missions over Europe in a B-25 in the Twelfth Air Force and was awarded the Distinguished Flying Cross before moving to California, where his mother was living at the time.

== Entertainment industry ==
After spending a few years running his own business, Grauman eventually took a job as stage manager at NBC's studios in Los Angeles. During his stint working at the network, he and relative (by marriage) Alan Armer developed a talent-show type program that proved popular, setting the mold for shows like Star Search and American Idol to follow.

In 1957, Grauman turned to films, directing "The Disembodied" for the "B film" division of Allied Artists Studios, which was headed by friend Walter Mirisch. Although he directed only six theatrical films, Grauman had one of the most active and long lasting television careers in history which included work on such shows as The Untouchables, The Fugitive, Route 66, The Streets of San Francisco, The Twilight Zone and Murder, She Wrote. He also reportedly helped to get Michael Douglas one of his first jobs as a lead on The Streets of San Francisco.

Grauman directed 633 Squadron, a World War II film about a fictional squadron in the British RAF. In interviews, George Lucas has commented that he patterned the "trench run" sequence in his Star Wars: Episode IV on a scene from this film. (See the article on 633 Squadron for more information.)

Grauman also directed a number of made-for-TV films, including the Aaron Spelling produced 1970 supernatural horror film Crowhaven Farm. Broadcast as an ABC Movie of the Week on 24 November 1970 and starring Hope Lange and Paul Burke, the film involves witchcraft, déjà vu, death, betrayal, revenge, and reincarnation, and it has become a cult classic.

Grauman was the creator/executive producer of the Los Angeles Spotlight Awards (not to be confused with the Spotlight Awards (GDC) for game developers), which are run through the Los Angeles Music Center. He was among the closest living relatives to Sid Grauman, owner and founder of Los Angeles' famous Grauman's Chinese Theater, Egyptian Theater and Million Dollar Theater. At the time of his death in 2015 at the age of 93, he resided in Los Angeles with his wife.

== Directorial credits, theatrical films ==
- The Disembodied (1957) Allied Artists
- Lady in a Cage (1964) Paramount Pictures
- 633 Squadron (1964) Mirisch/United Artists
- A Rage to Live (1965) Mirisch/UA
- I Deal in Danger (1966) 20th Century Fox
- The Last Escape (1970) Mirisch/UA

== Pilots and television series ==
- Columbo
- The Untouchables
- The Fugitive (pilot)
- The Streets of San Francisco (pilot)
- Barnaby Jones (pilot)
- East Side/West Side
- Naked City
- The New Breed (pilot)
- Route 66
- Blue Light
- Honey West (pilot)
- Manhunter (pilot)
- Most Wanted (pilot)
- Quinn Martin's Tales of the Unexpected (episode "No Way Out")
- Bare Essence (pilot)
- Harrigan & Son (pilot)
- Scene of the Crime (pilot)
- Murder, She Wrote (53 one-hour episodes)
- Blacke's Magic (episode "Vanishing Act")
- The Twilight Zone (episode "Miniature")

Plus over 275 30-minute and 1-hour filmed dramatic programs, including:

- V
- Trapper John, M.D.
- Twelve O'Clock High
- The Eleventh Hour
- Lancer
- Hotel de Paree
- Man Without a Gun
- Colt .45
- Cover Up
- Steve Canyon
- Peter Gunn
- Blue Light
- Burke's Law
- The June Allyson Show
- Empire

== Live television drama ==
- 80 Matinee Theater one-hour programs
- Alcoa Theatre
- The Philco Television Playhouse

== Director/creator/executive producer ==
- Blue Light - series, ABC
- Felony Squad - series, ABC
- The Silent Force - series, ABC
- Six Movies-of-the-Week, ABC
- World Premiere, NBC
- Eleven two-hour movies, CBS

== Movies for television and mini-series ==
- The Forgotten Man - Director/Producer/Creator
- Daughter of the Mind - Director/Executive Producer
- Crowhaven Farm - Director/Producer
- The Old Man Who Cried Wolf - Director/Producer
- Dead Men Tell No Tales - Director/Executive Producer
- Paper Man - Director/Executive Producer
- They Call It Murder - Director/Executive Producer
- Nightmare on the 13th Floor - Executive Producer/Director

== Movies for television and mini-series – director ==
- Are You in the House Alone? – 2 hr
- Crisis in Mid-air – 2 hr
- The Golden Gate Murders – David Janssen/Susannah York, 2 hr, CBS
- Irwin Shaw's Top of the Hill – Wayne Rogers, 4 hr
- The Memory of Eva Ryker- Natalie Wood, 3 hr, CBS
- Pleasure Palace – Omar Sharif, José Ferrer, 2 hr, CBS
- Outrage! – 2 hr, CBS
- Force Five – 2 hr, ABC
- Covenant – José Ferrer, 2 hr, NBC

== CBS movies and mini-series – director / producer ==
- To Race the Wind – Steve Guttenberg – 2 hr, CBS
- Jacqueline Susann's Valley of the Dolls, 1981 – 5 hr, CBS
- Bare Essence – 2 hr, CBS
- Illusions – 2 hr, CBS
- Who is Julia? – 2 hr, CBS
- Shakedown on Sunset Strip – 2 hr, CBS
