= Pete Kelly's Blues =

Pete Kelly's Blues can refer to:

- Pete Kelly's Blues (radio series)
  - Pete Kelly's Blues (film), 1955 film based on the radio series
    - Songs from Pete Kelly's Blues, soundtrack album of the 1955 film
    - "Pete Kelly's Blues" (song), 1955 song introduced in the movie
  - Pete Kelly's Blues (TV series), 1959 television series also based on the radio series

== See also ==
- Peter Kelly (disambiguation)
