= List of Route 66 episodes =

This is a list of episodes of the television series Route 66.

== Series overview ==
Season	Episodes	Originally released	
Season	Episodes	First released	Last released
1	30	October 7, 1960	June 16, 1961
2	32	September 22, 1961	June 1, 1962
3	31	September 21, 1962	May 24, 1963
4	23	September 27, 1963	March 20, 1964

== Episodes ==
=== Season 1 (1960–61) ===
No. overall	No. in season	Title	Directed by	Written by	Original release date	Filming order
1	1	"Black November"	Philip Leacock	Stirling Silliphant	October 7, 1960	001
Tod Stiles and Buz Murdock stop in the remote town of Garth, whose residents are determined to hide a terrible secret. George Kennedy is the first heavy to get into a fight with the boys.
2	2	"A Lance of Straw"	Roger Kay	Stirling Silliphant	October 14, 1960	002
Tod and Buz work as deck hands on a shrimp boat where they deal with a hurricane and their employer (Janice Rule)'s jealous suitor (Nico Minardos).
3	3	"The Swan Bed"	Elliot Silverstein	Stirling Silliphant	October 21, 1960	004
Tod and Buz arrive in New Orleans where they encounter a waspish woman (Betty Field), a band of smugglers and a parrot-fever epidemic.
4	4	"The Man on the Monkey Board"	Roger Kay	Stirling Silliphant	October 28, 1960	003
A concentration-camp victim finds his Nazi tormentor at an offshore-drilling barge where Tod and Buz happen to be working. Actors Ed Asner, Lew Ayres, Roger C. Carmel, Michael Conrad, Bruce Dern, Barnard Hughes, and Alfred Ryder all appear in this episode.
5	5	"The Strengthening Angels"	Arthur Hiller	Stirling Silliphant	November 4, 1960	006
Tod and Buz attempt to stop a sheriff from getting revenge on the woman who murdered his brother.
6	6	"Ten Drops of Water"	Philip Leacock	Howard Rodman	November 11, 1960	005
Tod and Buz try to help a beleaguered brother (Burt Brinckerhoff) and sister (Deborah Walley) save their drought-ridden Utah ranch.
7	7	"Three Sides"	Philip Leacock	Stirling Silliphant	November 18, 1960	007
Tod and Buz come to the aid of a wealthy Oregon rancher (E.G. Marshall) whose irresponsible children are wreaking havoc in his life and on his lands. Location: Grants Pass, OR
8	8	"Legacy for Lucia"	Philip Leacock	Story by : Melvin Levy and Stirling Silliphant; Teleplay by : Stirling Silliphant	November 25, 1960	008
A Sicilian woman (Arlene Martel) arrives in Oregon to sell the "deed" to the state given to her by a GI during World War II so she can raise money for her church.
9	9	"Layout at Glen Canyon"	Elliot Silverstein	Stirling Silliphant	December 2, 1960	009
Buz and Tod are assigned to guard a group of models.
10	10	"The Beryllium Eater"	Alvin Ganzer	Richard Collins	December 9, 1960	010
An elderly prospector (Edgar Buchanan)'s luck changes – for the worse – when he strikes a rich ore vein.
11	11	"A Fury Slinging Flame"	Elliot Silverstein	Stirling Silliphant	December 30, 1960	011
A scientist (Leslie Nielsen) declares his intention to stay in the Carisbad Caverns until a nuclear war is over.
12	12	"Sheba"	William Claxton	Stirling Silliphant	January 6, 1961	012
Tod and Buz help a widow (Whitney Blake) who's been framed for theft by a ruthless cattleman (Lee Marvin).
13	13	"The Quick and the Dead"	Alvin Ganzer	Story by : Charles Beaumont and Jerry Sohl; Teleplay by : Stirling Silliphant	January 13, 1961	013
Tod and Buz head to Riverside Raceway and get involved with a family on opposite sides of the father's future as a race-car driver.
14	14	"Play It Glissando"	Lewis Allen	Stirling Silliphant	January 20, 1961	014
A jazz trumpeter (Jack Lord) is accused of trying to murder his wife (Anne Francis).
15	15	"The Clover Throne"	Arthur Hiller	Herman Meadow	January 27, 1961	015
A date farmer (Jack Warden)'s ward (Anne Helm) is planning to leave him and a new road is about to cut through his property.
16	16	"Fly Away Home: Part 1"	Arthur Hiller	Stirling Silliphant	February 10, 1961	016
A pilot (Michael Rennie) who believes he's a jinx attempts to help a widow and her daughter save their crop-dusting business from financial trouble.
17	17	"Fly Away Home: Part 2"	Arthur Hiller	Stirling Silliphant	February 17, 1961	017
Summers (Michael Rennie) accepts a dangerous crop-dusting job in order to save the company for which he works from having to close down.
18	18	"Sleep on Four Pillows"	Ted Post	Stirling Silliphant	February 24, 1961	018
Tod and Buz stop in Los Angeles where they encounter a teenager (Patty McCormack) who claims to be on the run from the mob.
19	19	"An Absence of Tears"	Alvin Ganzer	Stirling Silliphant	March 3, 1961	019
Tod and Buz meet a blind woman (Martha Hyer) bent on killing the people who murdered her husband.
20	20	"Like a Motherless Child"	David Lowell Rich	Story by : Betty Andrews; Teleplay by : Howard Rodman	March 17, 1961	020
Buz deals with long-suppressed memories of living in an orphanage when he and Tod cross paths with a runaway orphan (played by Benedict Herrman) in Nevada. Sylvia Sidney and Jack Weston appear in prominent roles in a separate storyline.
21	21	"Effigy in Snow"	Alvin Ganzer	Stirling Silliphant	March 24, 1961	021
A deranged killer (Scott Marlowe) terrorizes a ski lodge in Squaw Valley.
22	22	"Eleven, the Hard Way"	William A. Graham	George Clayton Johnson	April 7, 1961	022
Tod and Buz, driving through Nevada, help protect the bankroll of two men who are from the dried up mining town of Broken Knee. The two men are heading to Reno to try to win enough money at the craps to fund a project that could save their town. Edward Andrews and Walter Matthau guest star.
23	23	"Most Vanquished, Most Victorious"	William Dario Faralla	Stirling Silliphant	April 14, 1961	023
Tod's Aunt Kitty (Beatrice Straight) wants to see her long-lost daughter before she dies, sending him and Buz on a depressing search through the slums of Los Angeles.
24	24	"Don't Count Stars"	Paul Wendkos	Stirling Silliphant	April 28, 1961	024
A drunk is wasting his young ward's inheritance.
25	25	"The Newborn"	Arthur Hiller	Story by : Herb Purdum; Teleplay by : Stirling Silliphant	May 5, 1961	025
Tod and Buz encounter a pregnant Indian girl on the run from her tyrannical father-in-law.
26	26	"A Skill for Hunting"	David Lowell Rich	Jack Turley and Milton Gelman	May 12, 1961	026
Tod and Buz face the wrath of a trucking tycoon (Gene Evans) determined to expand his business.
27	27	"Trap at Cordova"	Arthur Hiller	Story by : Joseph Vogel; Teleplay by : Stirling Silliphant	May 26, 1961	027
Tod and Buz are convicted of a violating a local law in a small New Mexico town where they're sentenced to teach a year of school.
28	28	"The Opponent"	David Lowell Rich	Story by : Leonard Freeman; Teleplay by : Stirling Silliphant	June 2, 1961	028
Buz's boyhood idol, a one-time boxing champ, is now barely ekeing out a career as a washed-up, easy-to-defeat "opponent". Featuring Darren McGavin, Ed Asner, and Lois Nettleton.
29	29	"Welcome to Amity"	Arthur Hiller	Will Lorin	June 9, 1961	029
The residents of small town band together to stop a young woman (Susan Oliver) from burying her despised mother in the local cemetery. Location: Kinsman, Ohio.
30	30	"Incident on a Bridge"	David Lowell Rich	Stirling Silliphant	June 16, 1961	030
Tod and Buz watch as a pair of violent, quick-tempered men compete for the hand of their landlord's mute daughter.

=== Season 2 (1961–62) ===
No. overall	No. in season	Title	Directed by	Written by	Original release date	Filming order
31	1	"A Month of Sundays"	Arthur Hiller	Stirling Silliphant	September 22, 1961	033
Buz courts an actress (Anne Francis), unaware that she only has three weeks to live.
32	2	"Blue Murder"	Arthur Hiller	Story by : Wilbur Daniel Steele; Teleplay by : Stirling Silliphant	September 29, 1961	034
A wild stallion is the prime suspect in series of brutal murders.
33	3	"Good Night, Sweet Blues"	Jack Smight	Story by : Leonard Freeman and Will Lorin; Teleplay by : Will Lorin	October 6, 1961	036
Tod and Buz go coast-to-coast to find a dying singer (Ethel Waters)'s old band.
34	4	"Birdcage on My Foot"	Elliot Silverstein	Story by : Stirling Silliphant and Elliot Silverstein; Teleplay by : Stirling Silliphant	October 13, 1961	038
Tod tries to rehabilitate a hostile drug addict (Robert Duvall).
35	5	"First Class Mouliak"	William Conrad	John Vlahos	October 20, 1961	032
A Cleveland girl's death sets off a search for her boyfriend (Robert Redford), who must explain that her death was an accident before he pays the ultimate price at the hands of the girl's father (Martin Balsam). Location: Cleveland, OH
36	6	"Once to Every Man"	Arthur Hiller	Frank L. Moss	October 27, 1961	039
A globe-trotting heiress on the run falls in love with Tod.
37	7	"The Mud Nest"	James Sheldon	Story by : Leonard Freeman; Teleplay by : Stirling Silliphant	November 10, 1961	040
Buz thinks he may have found his mother when he and Tod stop in a small Maryland town. George Maharais’s real-life siblings – brothers Mark and Hank and sister Cleopatra appear as the Colby clan.
38	8	"A Bridge Across Five Days"	Richard Donner	Howard Rodman	November 17, 1961	041
Tod and Buz befriend a woman (Nina Foch) who has just been released from a mental institute.
39	9	"Mon Petit Chou"	Sam Peckinpah	Stirling Silliphant	November 24, 1961	035
Tod takes action when an impresario, haunted by the memory of his cheating wife, mistreats his protégée.
40	10	"Some of the People, Some of the Time"	Robert Altman	Stirling Silliphant	December 1, 1961	043
Max Coyle promises a movie role to the winner of a beauty contest.
41	11	"The Thin White Line"	David Lowell Rich	Story by : Jordan Brotman & Bill Stine; Teleplay by : Leonard Freeman	December 8, 1961	044
Tod's drink is spiked with a hallucinatory drug, making him a danger to himself and to others.
42	12	"And the Cat Jumped Over the Moon"	Elliot Silverstein	Frank L. Moss	December 15, 1961	045
Tod and Buz get caught up in a gang war as they try to help a harried social worker.
43	13	"Burning for Burning"	Charles Haas	Stirling Silliphant	December 29, 1961	042
A widow tries to make amends with her bitter mother-in-law.
44	14	"To Walk with the Serpent"	James Sheldon	Will Lorin	January 5, 1962	037
Tod and Buz help an FBI agent stop a madman from setting off a bomb in Boston.
45	15	"A Long Piece of Mischief"	David Lowell Rich	Story by : Richard Shapiro and Esther Mayesh; Teleplay by : Stirling Silliphant	January 19, 1962	046
Tod and Buz come to the aid of a rodeo clown whom no one takes seriously, especially the woman he loves.
46	16	"1800 Days to Justice"	David Lowell Rich	Jo Pagano	January 26, 1962	047
An ex-con convinces a small-town to organise the trial of the man who was responsible for wrongly putting him in jail.
47	17	"A City of Wheels"	David Lowell Rich	Frank Chase	February 2, 1962	049
A beautiful woman tries to help a paraplegic out of self-pity and frustration.
48	18	"How Much a Pound Is Albatross?"	David Lowell Rich	Stirling Silliphant	February 9, 1962	050
Tod falls for a flaky female motorcyclist (Julie Newmar).
49	19	"Aren't You Surprised to See Me?"	James Sheldon	Stirling Silliphant	February 16, 1962	048
A religious madman takes Buz hostage and threatens to kill him unless the people of Dallas go a full day without committing sin.
50	20	"You Never Had It So Good"	James Sheldon	Story by : Frank L. Moss; Teleplay by : Frank L. Moss and Stirling Silliphant	February 23, 1962	051
Buz is promoted to an executive position at a large construction factory.
51	21	"Shoulder the Sky My Lad"	David Lowell Rich	Mort Thaw	March 2, 1962	052
Tod and Buz pursue a 13-year-old boy who ran away following his father's murder.
52	22	"Blues for a Left Foot"	Arthur Hiller	Leonard Freeman	March 9, 1962	053
Tod helps an old girlfriend whose dancing career is in jeopardy.
53	23	"Go Read the River"	Arthur Hiller	Stirling Silliphant	March 16, 1962	054
Tod tries to help a girl make peace with her estranged father.
54	24	"Even Stones Have Eyes"	Robert Gist	Barry Trivers	March 30, 1962	055
Buz loses his sight in an accident at a construction company where he's working.
55	25	"Love Is a Skinny Kid"	James Sheldon	Stirling Silliphant	April 6, 1962	056
The arrival of a masked girl in a small Texas town sets off a series of chaotic events.
56	26	"Kiss the Maiden All Forlorn"	David Lowell Rich	Stirling Silliphant	April 13, 1962	057
An embezzler (Douglas Fairbanks Jr.) returns from his sanctuary abroad to stop his daughter (Zina Bethune) from becoming a nun.
57	27	"Two on the House"	David Lowell Rich	Gilbert Ralston	April 20, 1962	031
A construction tycoon has no time for his 12-year-old son, even when he receives a letter threatening the boy's life.
58	28	"There I Am, There I Always Am"	John Newland	Stirling Silliphant	May 4, 1962	058
Buz tries to rescue a girl trapped between two rocks off the coast of Catalina Island.
59	29	"Between Hello and Goodbye"	David Lowell Rich	Stirling Silliphant	May 11, 1962	059
Tod falls in love with an emotionally disturbed woman whose life is oddly connected with that of her lookalike sister.
60	30	"A Feat of Strength"	David Lowell Rich	Story by : Everett DeBaum; Teleplay by : Howard Rodman and Joseph Petracca	May 18, 1962	060
A wrestling promoter is in love with the wife of the wrestler he's attempting to free from a Hungarian prison.
61	31	"Hell Is Empty, All the Devils Are Here"	Paul Stanley	Stirling Silliphant	May 25, 1962	061
The owner of an animal exhibition (Peter Graves) plots to avenge the death of his first wife.
62	32	"From an Enchantress Fleeing"	William A. Graham	Story by : Abram S. Ginnes; Teleplay by : Stirling Silliphant	June 1, 1962	062
Tod tries to reconcile a successful dentist with her husband.

=== Season 3 (1962–63) ===
No. overall	No. in season	Title	Directed by	Written by	Original release date	Filming order
63	1	"One Tiger to a Hill"	David Lowell Rich	Stirling Silliphant	September 21, 1962	067
Tod and Buz clash with a fisherman whose wartime experiences have turned him against mankind.
64	2	"Journey to Nineveh"	David Lowell Rich	William R. Cox	September 28, 1962	064
Buz and Tod arrive in Harleyville, Missouri, where they deal with the town jinx (Buster Keaton).
65	3	"Man Out of Time"	David Lowell Rich	Larry Marcus	October 5, 1962	070
An ex-gangster (Luther Adler) believes there's a price on his head as soon as he's released from jail.
66	4	"Ever Ride the Waves in Oklahoma?"	Robert Gist	Story by : Borden Chase and Frank Chase; Teleplay by : Stirling Silliphant	October 12, 1962	066
Buz is tricked into challenging a surfing champ to a dangerous ride that got another youth killed.
67	5	"Voice at the End of the Line"	David Lowell Rich	Larry Marcus	October 19, 1962	069
Buz helps a shy man prepare to meet a girl he only knows over the phone.
68	6	"Lizard's Leg and Owlet's Wing"	Robert Gist	Stirling Silliphant	October 26, 1962	071
Buz gets a job overseeing a secretaries' convention, while Tod has to moderate a meeting between Lon Chaney Jr., Boris Karloff and Peter Lorre.
69	7	"Across Walnuts and Wine"	Herbert B. Leonard	Stirling Silliphant	November 2, 1962	068
Tod and Buz meet a struggling businesswoman (Nina Foch) who attends daily seances to solve her problems.
70	8	"Welcome to the Wedding"	George Sherman	Howard Rodman	November 9, 1962	073
A sociopath murderer (Rod Steiger) who says he has no feelings and has never known remorse takes Tod hostage at gunpoint to hunt for hidden loot.
71	9	"Every Father's Daughter a.k.a Every Father's Daughter Must Weave Her Own"	Richard L. Bare	Anthony Lawrence	November 16, 1962	072
Buz falls for a girl (Madlyn Rhue) caught between her overprotective father (Jack Kruschen) and self-righteous brother (Robert Drivas).
72	10	"Poor Little Kangaroo Rat"	Walter E. Grauman	Les Pine	November 23, 1962	065
A doctor hires Buz and Tod to capture sharks for his cholesterol research.
73	11	"Hey Moth, Come Eat the Flame"	James Sheldon	Stirling Silliphant	November 30, 1962	075
Tod and Buz try to help a teenager deal with his father's alcoholism.
74	12	"Only by Cunning Glimpses"	Tom Gries	Story by : Stirling Silliphant and Preston Wood; Teleplay by : Stirling Silliphant	December 7, 1962	074
Tod tries to disprove a spiritualist (Lois Smith)'s prediction that he will kill Buz.
75	13	"Where Is Chick Lorrimer? Where Has He Gone?"	George Sherman	Story by : Bert Lambert; Teleplay by : Larry Marcus	December 14, 1962	076
Tod tries to find a fast-talking strip teaser he unknowingly helped escape from a surly bail bondsman.
76	14	"Give an Old Cat a Tender Mouse"	Tom Gries	Stirling Silliphant	December 21, 1962	077
A persistent policeman helps Tod stay just one step behind Vicki Russell.
77	15	"A Bunch of Lonely Pagliaccis"	Tom Gries	Stirling Silliphant	January 4, 1963	079
Tod investigates the murder of a man who was supposedly unfaithful to his wife.
78	16	"You Can't Pick Cotton in Tahiti"	Robert Ellis Miller	Shimon Wincelberg	January 11, 1963	078
A country girl falls for a man who's broken a lot of hearts.
79	17	"A Gift for a Warrior"	David Lowell Rich	Television Story and Teleplay: Larry Marcus; Based on a story by: Harlan Ellison	January 18, 1963	063
A young German sailor sets out to find his father and kill him. Last episode featuring George Maharis.
80	18	"Suppose I Said I Was the Queen of Spain"	David Lowell Rich	Story by : Jerome B. Thomas; Teleplay by : Stirling Silliphant	February 8, 1963	081
Tod looks for a girl (Lois Nettleton) who uses a different alias every time he sees her.
81	19	"Somehow It Gets to Be Tomorrow"	David Lowell Rich	Stirling Silliphant	February 15, 1963	082
Tod befriends a 13-year-old boy and inadvertently worsens the boy's troubled relationship with his foster parents.
82	20	"Shall Forfeit His Dog and Ten Shillings to the King"	Tom Gries	Stirling Silliphant	February 22, 1963	080
Tod joins a posse when he witnesses a brutal murder.
83	21	"In the Closing of a Trunk"	Ralph Senensky	Stirling Silliphant	March 8, 1963	083
After 27 years in prison, a woman (Ruth Roman) returns to a village in the Gulf Coast to find her son while facing continuing hostility in the village.
84	22	"The Cage Around Maria"	George Sherman	Jesse Sandler	March 15, 1963	084
Maria Cardenas (Elizabeth Ashley) intends to commit suicide when she finds herself caught between her amorous stepfather (Mario Alcalde), her invalid mother (Beatrice Straight), and Tod.
85	23	"Fifty Miles from Home"	James Sheldon	Stirling Silliphant	March 22, 1963	085
Vietnam War hero Linc Case has trouble living up to his reputation, especially when he gets into a brawl with a youth.
86	24	"Narcissus on an Old Red Fire Engine"	Ralph Senensky	Joel Carpenter	March 29, 1963	086
Linc falls for a woman (Anne Helm) with periodic journeys into an imaginary world.
87	25	"The Cruelest Sea of All"	James Sheldon	Stirling Silliphant	April 5, 1963	087
A mysterious show swimmer (Diane Baker) falls for Tod. She's reluctant to talk about her past and Tod can't believe some of what she does reveal. Location: Weeki Wachee, FL
88	26	"Peace, Pity, Pardon"	Robert Ellis Miller	Stirling Silliphant	April 12, 1963	088
A Cuban supports Castro's government, while his brothers oppose it.
89	27	"What a Shining Young Man Was Our Gallant Lieutenant"	James Goldstone	Howard Rodman	April 26, 1963	089
Linc attempts to help his former Army platoon leader Lt. School (Dick York), whose war injuries have left him permanently with the mind of a seven-year-old.
90	28	"But What Do You Do in March?"	Robert Ellis Miller	Stirling Silliphant	May 3, 1963	091
Tod hunts down the speedboat driver who wrecked his dinghy then he and Linc get mixed up with two rich spoiled women (Janice Rule and Susan Kohner). Location: Tierra Verde, FL
91	29	"Who Will Cheer My Bonnie Bride?"	James Goldstone	Shimon Wincelberg	May 10, 1963	092
Linc is suspected of being a thief when a pair of hoodlums (Albert Salmi and Rip Torn) force him at gunpoint to drive their getaway car.
92	30	"Shadows of an Afternoon"	James Sheldon	Story by : Leonard Freeman and Eric Scott; Teleplay by : Leonard Freeman and Alvin Sargent	May 17, 1963	093
In a small Florida town, Linc is thrown in jail on a false charge of hurting a dog, whose life he actually saved.
93	31	"Soda Pop and Paper Flags"	Fred Jackman	John McGreevey	May 24, 1963	090
An epidemic breaks out in a Midwestern town where Tod, Linc and a drifter (Chester Morris) are working – and one of them is suspected of being the carrier. Locations: Highland, Illinois; St. Louis, Missouri.

=== Season 4 (1963–64) ===
No. overall	No. in season	Title	Directed by	Written by	Original release date	Filming order
94	1	"Two Strangers and an Old Enemy"	Walter E. Grauman	Stirling Silliphant	September 27, 1963	094
A Japanese man (Sessue Hayakawa) joins the search for a pilot who crashed in the Everglades, their lives somehow connected. Location: Cape Coral, FL
95	2	"Same Picture, Different Frame"	Philip Leacock	Stirling Silliphant	October 4, 1963	102
A distraught woman (Joan Crawford) is on the run from her deranged ex-husband whom she believes is bent on murdering her. Location: Poland Spring, ME
96	3	"Come Out, Come Out Wherever You Are"	Alvin Ganzer	Story by : Richard Jessup; Teleplay by : Anthony Basta and Stirling Silliphant	October 11, 1963	101
Tod prepares for the worst when Linc falls for a fickle French-Canadian girl (Diane Baker).
97	4	"Where Are the Sounds of Celli Brahms?"	Allen Miner	Stirling Silliphant	October 18, 1963	097
Linc gets ready to judge a beauty contest, while Tod attempts to keep up with a tireless acoustical engineer (Tammy Grimes) who lacks some important social skills. Location: Minneapolis, MN
98	5	"Build Your Houses with Their Backs to the Sea"	Frank R. Pierson	Frank R. Pierson	October 25, 1963	100
Ted and Linc get caught in the middle of a feud between a fisherman (Pat Hingle) and his son (William Shatner). Location: Portland, ME
99	6	"And Make Thunder His Tribute"	Leonard Horn	Lewis John Carlino	November 1, 1963	098
A stubborn farmer (J. Carrol Naish) constantly clashes with his rebellious son (Lou Antonio).
100	7	"The Stone Guest"	Allen Miner	Stirling Silliphant	November 8, 1963	096
In Colorado, an opera troupe's production of Don Giovanni is topped by an off-stage affair between a philandering miner (Lee Philips) and a lonely woman (Jo Van Fleet).
101	8	"I Wouldn't Start from Here"	Allen Miner	Ernest Kinoy	November 15, 1963	103
Tod and Linc work for an elderly New England farmer (Parker Fennelly) trying to make a living. Location: Newfane, VT
102	9	"A Cage in Search of a Bird"	James Sheldon	Stirling Silliphant	November 29, 1963 (Note: Originally scheduled for November 22, 1963, but delayed due to the assassination of John F. Kennedy)	095
An elderly uncaught bank robber wants to bestow his illicit fortune on a dicey woman (Stefanie Powers) who is on the run from her fellow cardsharp boyfriend (Alex Cord). Location: Denver & Golden, CO
103	10	"A Long Way from St. Louie"	Alvin Ganzer	Stirling Silliphant	December 6, 1963	107
Linc tries to help five women who've been sent out into the cold by an unfeeling hotel manager. Location: Toronto, Ontario, Canada
104	11	"Come Home, Greta Inger Gruenchaffen"	Philip Leacock	Joel Carpenter	December 13, 1963	104
Tod and Linc compete for the attentions of physical culturist Greta Inger Gruenchaffen (Tammy Grimes). Location: Mt. Snow, VT
105	12	"93 Percent in Smiling"	Philip Leacock	Story by : Walter Brough and Alvin Sargent; Teleplay by : Alvin Sargent	December 20, 1963	106
After years of nomadic living in a mobile home due to their father (Albert Salmi)'s inability to satisfactorily provide for his family, two children decide to give their baby brother a better life in an empty house.
106	13	"Child of a Night"	Allen Miner	Stirling Silliphant	January 3, 1964	108
Linc is sent on a mission to deliver $38,000 to a dying man (Herschel Bernardi)'s child. Location: Savannah, GA. Daniel J. Travanti, early in his career, plays Marty Johnson.
107	14	"Is It True There Are Poxies at the Bottom of Landfair Lake?"	John Peyser	Alvin Sargent	January 10, 1964	109
Simon Devereaux (Geoffrey Horne) returns home from his humiliating experiences in the Army and sets out to shield his father Amos (Crahan Denton) and sister Olivia (E. J. Peaker) from "city folks". Olivia is bored with small-town life and wants to experience the rest of the world. Location: Nevils (Bulloch County), GA
108	15	"Like This It Means Father, Like This Bitter, Like This Tiger"	Jeffrey Hayden	Stirling Silliphant	January 17, 1964	110
Linc ruins a coward (Larry Blyden)'s attempts at burying his past. Location: Savannah, GA
109	16	"Kiss the Monster, Make Him Sleep"	Allen Reisner	Stanley R. Greenberg	January 24, 1964	099
Linc falls for a woman (Barbara Mattes) seeking to be independent of her possessive brother (James Coburn). Location: Minneapolis, MN
110	17	"Cries of Persons Close to One"	Allen Miner	Story by : William Kelley; Teleplay by : Howard Rodman	January 31, 1964	111
A third-rate fighter throws fits of depression and violent outbursts after years of alcoholism.
111	18	"Who in His Right Mind Needs a Nice Girl?"	Jeffrey Hayden	Joel Carpenter	February 7, 1964	112
A murderer (Lee Philips) wants a librarian (Lois Smith) to help him escape the authorities. Location: Daytona Beach, FL
112	19	"This Is Going to Hurt Me More Than It Hurts You"	Alvin Ganzer	Stirling Silliphant	February 14, 1964	113
Several "desperately sick" women plot to exploit a millionaire's weakness for ill people. Location: The Ponce de Leon Hotel, St. Augustine, FL
113	20	"Follow the White Dove with the Broken Wing"	Denis Sanders	Alvin Sargent	February 21, 1964	114
A disturbed teenager (Lee Kinsolving) kills his only friend by accident and becomes the target of an angry posse. Location: St. Augustine, FL
114	21	"Where There's a Will, There's a Way: Part 1"	Alvin Ganzer	Stirling Silliphant	March 6, 1964	115
Tod must get married in order to receive $100,000. Location: Tampa Bay area, FL
115	22	"Where There's a Will, There's a Way: Part 2"	Alvin Ganzer	Stirling Silliphant	March 13, 1964	116
Now that Tod is married to Margo Tiffin (Barbara Eden) his life is endangered by his greedy new in-laws. Location: Tampa Bay area, FL
116	23	"I'm Here to Kill a King"	Allen Reisner	Stirling Silliphant	March 20, 1964	105
A hired assassin bears a remarkable resemblance to Tod. Location: Niagara Falls, NY
