= Tod Stiles =

Fictional character in American drama television series

Tod Stiles is a fictional character portrayed by actor Martin Milner on the 1960s American prime-time dramatic television series Route 66. Tod was one of three main regular characters on the program, and the only one to appear in all 116 episodes of the show's four seasons.

== Character history ==
Tod was born March 12, 1936, in New York City at 4:30 AM, and raised in Rye (although he gives his birthplace as Connecticut on at least one occasion; his driver's license states that his hometown is Rye, New York), the son of Lee and Martha Stiles. His father was the owner of a shipping company in New York City. In 1960, shortly after Tod's graduation from Yale University, the elder Stiles suffered a series of business misfortunes that left him bankrupt. He then died of a coronary thrombosis, leaving Tod an inheritance consisting of little more than a brand new convertible Chevrolet Corvette. With his future now in his own hands, Tod and his best friend Buz Murdock (George Maharis), an ex-gang member whom Tod's father had taken under his wing, decided to hit the road in the new car, traveling across America to seek their fortune in a variety of different jobs.

After more than two years of adventuring on the road, Buz became seriously ill and was unable to travel with Tod any longer. Tod traveled by himself for a while, and then while working in Houston he encountered ex-Army Ranger and POW Lincoln Case (Glenn Corbett), who had just returned from a stint in Vietnam. Although circumstances of their first meeting initially drew Tod and Linc into conflict (including a fistfight), the two soon became fast friends and Linc became his new traveling partner.

After a year or so more of hopping around the country with Linc, Tod met Margo Tiffin (played by Barbara Eden), whose father Alexander had previously known Tod, in Tampa (where the episode was filmed). Mr. Tiffin had been so enamored of Tod that he left a stipulation in his will that required his daughter to marry him. Despite the forced circumstances of the relationship, Tod and Margo did indeed end up actually falling in love with each other and were married. After having to spend some time fending off the efforts of unscrupulous family members to claim Margo's father's fortune, Tod and his new bride determined to settle down, ending both Tod's nomadic lifestyle and the series. This occurred during the two-part series finale of Route 66, both episodes of which aired in March 1964.

== Personality Traits ==
The boyish-faced Tod usually presents a glib, affable, extroverted front which lightly masks a deeply thoughtful, introspective nature. At heart, he is a serious and analytical personality type with a strong moral code of ethics. Although primarily a pacifist, when the occasion calls for it he demonstrates himself just as able in fisticuffs as his more streetwise companion Buz. Throughout the series Tod shows an interest in racing sports of all kinds, and in one episode even modifies the Corvette to become a race car. He is also a licensed pilot. Due to his privileged upbringing, he is generally more comfortable in dealing with wealthy or aristocratic "society" types than Buz. Though Tod is seldom overtly snobbish, Tod and Buz will occasionally clash if and when Tod unthinkingly flaunts his education and/or society charm.

Tod's eventual marriage to Margo Tiffin, while it seems the result of a hurried and circumstantially forced romance, is actually very much in keeping with the tendency Tod displayed over the course of the series to fall quick and hard for whichever young female happened to be handy. In fact, on at least two previous occasions during the course of his adventures, Tod very nearly married women whom he had only briefly known.
