= Lincoln Case =

Fictional character from Route 66

Glenn Corbett as Lincoln Case from the Route 66 episode "Fifty Miles From Home".

Lincoln Case is a fictional character portrayed by actor Glenn Corbett on the 1960s American prime-time drama Route 66. His character, a recently returned veteran of the Vietnam War, appears in the series starting in 1962.

Linc was one of three main regular characters on the program. His tenure began midway through the show's third season, when he was written in as a replacement for the departed Buz Murdock (played by George Maharis). Linc appeared in the final 32 of the program's 116 episodes as a sidekick to the character of Tod Stiles (played by Martin Milner).

The character has a certain historical significance. Linc was an Army [his Class A Uniform w/Class A 5th Special Forces Unit Patch and 1st Cavalry Division Combat Unit Patch on the right sleeve] (Linc may have a Ranger tab - unknown - but he is not wearing the Ranger Regimental Unit Patch) Ranger returning from service in the Vietnam War, which in the early 1960s was just beginning to become a major concern of ordinary Americans. His appearance made Route 66 the first dramatic television series to feature a recurring character who was directly involved in Vietnam. Many scripts and storylines of the show featured Linc trying to come to terms with his wartime experiences and adjust to civilian life. (Corbett, who played Linc, was a Navy veteran who had served in Korea.)

Linc's mother was portrayed by Linda Watkins in two episodes of the series. His father, Thomas, although an important character in Linc's tenure on the series, is never seen by the viewer and is only briefly heard as a voice over the telephone.

Author David Morrell is on record as being a huge fan of the Route 66 series and credits it for his inspiration to become a writer.

Stirling Silliphant, the primary creator of the series and the writer of the episode in which Linc Case was introduced, later authored a series of novels featuring another Vietnam veteran character, adventurer John Locke.

== Character history ==
Linc Case was introduced in the episode "Fifty Miles From Home," first telecast on March 22, 1963. He is established as a native of the fictional town of Landor, Texas. He gives his age as 26 in an episode aired in early 1964; he is therefore most likely meant to be about 25 when we first meet him.

Linc arrives in Houston on his way home after finishing a tour of duty which included an escape from a Vietnam administered POW camp. He has been in the army for six years, and has been granted leave. While in Houston, Linc is physically harassed by a group of young collegians. His temper snaps, and he viciously attacks the youths, using advanced judo techniques mastered during his military career. Linc injures several of them, and maims for life a promising young basketball star.

An enraged Tod Stiles, a friend of some of the youths that Linc attacked, follows Linc back to his hometown, where a hero's welcome has been prepared for him. Tod and Linc fight to a draw when Linc holds himself back from using his judo on Tod. The two then come to a mutual respect for each other. Linc then pays a visit to his mother and relates some of his experiences in the war to her, including an incident in which a Vietnamese family sacrificed their own lives to hide him from the enemy. Linc tells his mother that he has no desire to attend the ceremonies for him, since the people of the town, in which Linc grew up a loner and outsider, cannot possibly understand or relate to his experiences. He also announces his attempt to search for meaning in his own life, and accordingly decides to join up with Tod and wander the country with him. Linc is still technically on leave from the army for his first several appearances, before finally making the decision to resign and become a civilian in the episode "Peace, Pity, Pardon".

A few episodes during Linc's tenure on the show brought him into contact with people and circumstances from his recent Vietnam past. In the segment "What a Shining Young Man Was Our Gallant Lieutenant," Linc planned to pay a visit to his former commanding officer Lieutenant School (played by Dick York) living near Tampa. However, Linc learned that head injuries combined with trauma experienced by the man during the war had caused a mental collapse, and he subsequently believed himself to be an eight-year-old boy. Linc determined to stay with the Lieutenant as his "playmate" out of his past loyalty to the man, before finally coming to a realization that there could be no real place for him in the Lieutenant's world of perpetual childhood.

In another episode, "Like This it Means Tiger, Like This - Bitter, Like This - Father" (the title refers to the Chinese word Fu whose different pronunciations confer different meanings upon it), Linc was working in Savannah, Georgia. He ran into Camden Wilcox (played by Larry Blyden), a former member of his Vietnam unit whose act of cowardice during a skirmish had caused the deaths of two members of Linc's patrol. Linc brutally beat Wilcox and announced his intention of persecuting the man until he admitted his culpability. Linc eventually made his peace with Cam, however, as well as with his own memories of the incident.

At the time of his introduction to the series, Linc was estranged from his father, Thomas Case, feeling that the older man never attempted to understand him or relate to him as an individual. Linc steadfastly refused to visit or even speak to his father throughout most of his time on the series. This finally came to an end in the late fourth-season episode "Kiss the Monster, Make Him Sleep," at the conclusion of which Linc finally gave into his mother's entreaties and called his father on the telephone, speaking to him for the first time since his departure from home. The elder Case broke down upon finally hearing his son's voice again.

In the two-part series finale of Route 66, "Where There's a Will, There's a Way," after attending a funeral in Tampa involving some complex characters, Tod got married and Linc announced his own intention to return home.

== Personality traits ==
With a slightly hard edge to his robustly handsome features and lightly colored eyes, Linc is a taciturn and introverted individual, in stark contrast to his expressively emotive predecessor Buz Murdock. Nonetheless, Linc beneath his often seemingly cold and indifferent exterior possesses a wealth of compassion and a droll, low-key sense of humor, as well as a strong sense of loyalty to those he considers his friends. However, he also harbors a fierce temper, which is quick to ignite. Linc's military service has taught him a number of conventional skills which prove handy in his ability to find many different kinds of work, as well as a few unconventional ones which he occasionally finds use for in his sometimes dangerous exploits with his friend Tod.
