= Peter Kelly =

Peter or Pete Kelly may refer to:

== Sports ==
- Pete Kelly (ice hockey) (1913–2004), Canadian ice hockey player
- Peter Kelly (cricketer) (1942–2023), Australian cricketer
- Peter Kelly (Dublin hurler) (born 1989), hurling player with Dublin
- Peter Kelly (Gaelic footballer), Gaelic football player
- Peter Kelly (rugby league) (born 1959), Australian rugby league player
- Peter Kelly (soccer) (born 1991), American soccer player
- Peter Kelly (sports administrator) (1847–1908), president of the Gaelic Athletic Association
- Peter Kelly (Scottish footballer) (born 1956)
- Peter Kelly (footballer, born 1901) (1901–1979), English footballer
- Peter Kelly (speedway rider) (1935–2023), English motorcycle speedway rider

== Politics ==
- Pete Kelly (Alaska politician) (born 1956), American politician
- Peter G. Kelly (born 1938), American lobbyist and political consultant
- Peter Kelly (Irish politician) (1944–2019), Irish Fianna Fáil politician and TD for Longford-Roscommon
- Peter Trainor Kelly (died 1948), Irish senator
- Peter Kelly (judge) (born 1950), former president of the High Court of Ireland
- Peter J. Kelly (born 1956/1957), mayor of the Halifax Regional Municipality, Nova Scotia, Canada, 2000–2012

== Other ==
- Peter Kelly (piper) (1837–1910), Irish piper
- Peter X. Kelly (born 1959), restaurateur and chef

== See also ==
- Peter Kelley (born 1974), weightlifter
- Pete Kelly's Blues (disambiguation)
