= Pete Kelly's Blues (radio series) =

American crime-musical radio drama

- Country of origin: United States
- Language: English
- Starring: Jack Webb
- Created by: Richard L. Breen
- Original release: July 4 – September 19, 1951

Pete Kelly's Blues was an American crime-musical radio drama which aired over NBC as an unsponsored summer replacement series on Wednesday nights at 8 pm (et) from July 4 through September 19, 1951. The series starred Jack Webb as Pete Kelly and was created by writer Richard L. Breen, who had previously worked with Webb on Pat Novak for Hire; James Moser and Jo Eisinger wrote most of the other scripts. It ran concurrently with Webb's best known radio series, Dragnet.

Set in Kansas City, Missouri, in the early 1920s, the series was a crime drama with a strong musical atmosphere (Webb was a noted Dixieland jazz enthusiast). Kansas City in this era was a hotbed of jazz, as well as of organized crime and political corruption, all of which influenced the series.

== Overview ==
Pete Kelly was a musician, a cornet player who headed his own jazz combo, "Pete Kelly's Big Seven." They worked at 417 Cherry Street, a speakeasy run by George Lupo, often mentioned but never heard. Kelly, narrating the series, described Lupo as a "fat, friendly little guy." The plots typically centered on Kelly's reluctant involvement with gangsters, gun molls, FBI agents, and people trying to save their own skins. The endings were often downbeat.

The supporting cast was minimal; apart from the off-mike character Lupo and occasional speaking parts by the band members (notably Red the bass player, played by Jack Kruschen), the only other regular role of note was Maggie Jackson, the torch singer at another club (Fat Annie's, "across the river on the Kansas side"), played by blues singer Meredith Howard.

In one episode, Bessie Smith is mentioned as the singer at Fat Annie's instead of Maggie Jackson. Boozy ex-bootlegger Barney Ricketts would show up occasionally, an informant not unlike the character Jocko Madigan on Webb and Breen's Pat Novak for Hire. The episodic roles were filled by William Conrad (as various mob bosses), Vic Perrin, and Roy Glenn, among others.

== Music ==
The music dominated the series. In addition to one song by Maggie Jackson, each episode boasted two jazz numbers by the "Big Seven." The group was actually led by Dick Cathcart, the cornet player who was Pete Kelly's musical stand-in. The other members of the group, all well known jazz musicians, included Matty Matlock on clarinet, Moe Schneider on trombone, piano player Ray Sherman, bass player Morty Corb, guitarist Bill Newman, and drummer Nick Fatool. The show's announcer was another frequent Webb collaborator, George Fenneman, who would open each show with "This one's about Pete Kelly."

== Legacy ==
The series lasted only three months, but inspired a 1955 film version of Pete Kelly's Blues, in which Jack Webb produced, directed and starred. It used many of the same musicians, including Cathcart, and Ella Fitzgerald was cast as Maggie Jackson. A lesser-known television version, still produced and directed by Webb but with William Reynolds in the lead, aired in 1959, using scripts originally written for the radio version.

After the film, two albums were released, a soundtrack recording and Pete Kelly Lets His Hair Down, an instrumental album using the musicians from the series with songs arranged by tempo - "blue songs" and "red songs" with names such as "Peacock," '"Periwinkle," "Midnight," "Rouge," "Flame'" and '"Fire Engine." This LP was released by Rhino Records as one-half of a Webb compilation disc, Just The Tracks, Ma’am.

== See also ==
- Pete Kelly's Blues (film)
- Pete Kelly's Blues (song)
- Pete Kelly's Blues (TV series)
- Songs from Pete Kelly's Blues

== Sources ==
- McNeil, Alex (1991). Total Television: A Comprehensive Guide to Programming from 1948 to the Present. p. 598. Penguin. ISBN 0140267379
