= Buz Murdock =

Fictional character of Route 66 TV series

George Maharis as Buz Murdock, with guest star Julie Newmar on Route 66, 1962

Buz Murdock was a fictional character portrayed by actor George Maharis on the 1960s American prime-time dramatic television series Route 66. Buz was one of three main regular characters on the program, and his tenure lasted for two and a half of the program's four seasons. It ended with Maharis' departure from the show. All told, Buz appeared in 71 of the 116 original episodes.

== Character history ==
Although Buz's actual birth date is unknown, it was sometime around September 1937. He spent his early childhood in an orphanage, the St. Francis Home for Foundlings. Later, he grew up in the Hell's Kitchen section of New York City. Buz's troubled early youth led to his involvement in juvenile delinquency and street gangs. However, Buz was eventually able to escape this life due to the intervention of two individuals. One was a dedicated social worker named Chuck Brennan. The other was a shipping company owner named Lee Stiles, who gave Buz a job on one of his barges. Buz became close friends with his employer's Ivy League son, Tod (portrayed by Martin Milner), who worked under Buz's supervision on a barge each summer. Following the death of the elder Stiles in 1960, it was revealed that he was bankrupt. Virtually his sole legacy to Tod was a brand new Chevrolet Corvette. Buz and Tod then teamed up to seek their fortune, traveling throughout America and taking various odd jobs.

Some conflicting information is given over the course of the series concerning the circumstances surrounding Buz's origin. In "The Mud Nest," he was said to have been left on the doorstep of an orphanage and to have never known who his real parents were. In that episode, he goes on a quest for his mother on the assumption that she is still alive. However, in an earlier episode, the previous season's "Like a Motherless Child", Buz stated that he knew for a fact that both his parents were dead.

After two years of adventuring with Tod, Buz briefly became ill with an unspecified malady. He missed the final four episodes of the second season. And, although he returned for the premiere of season three, after only a handful of episodes, Buz became ill and disappeared again from the show, this time never to return. During the period of Buz's absence, Tod traveled and had adventures on his own. He can often be seen in these episodes writing letters to and having one-way phone conversations with an unseen Buz, who is said to be hospitalized. George Maharis continued to receive on-screen credit for these episodes, although Buz does not appear in them. The last episode to feature Buz Murdock was "A Gift For a Warrior", which originally aired on January 18, 1963 (although it was probably filmed much earlier in the season in relation to the order in which the episodes aired, the last full episode Maharis actually completed filming was "Hey Moth, Come Eat the Flame.") After this episode, the character of Buz Murdock was never mentioned again. Eventually, the role of Tod's sidekick was taken up by the character of Lincoln Case (Glenn Corbett), who finished out the remainder of the series.

In the short-lived sequel series to Route 66, which aired for just four episodes during the summer of 1993, Buz Murdock is established as the illegitimate father of the character Nick Lewis (portrayed by actor James Wilder). The premise of the more recent series is that Buz willed the car to Nick following Buz's death. However, this is inconsistent with the fact that it was Tod, not Buz, who was the owner of the car and that the two had parted ways (with Tod keeping the car) long before the conclusion of the original series. Furthermore, many fans of the original series felt that it would have been grossly out of character for Buz to knowingly abandon a son he had fathered, especially considering the trauma of Buz's own background as an orphan.

== Personality traits ==
Dark-featured Buz has a soft, handsome face that belies a fiery, intense nature and a rabid zest for life. Although he lacks the Ivy League education of his close friend Tod, he is capable of being just as articulate, witty, and intelligent. Despite his refinement, Buz is not above reverting to his rough past and using his fists when the occasion calls for it - and very rarely does he come out on the losing end of a scrap. He is a music aficionado with a particular taste for jazz, as well as a fan of old-time movies with an encyclopedic knowledge. One of Buz's most renowned characteristics that he displays during the course of the series is his penchant for going on inspired, poetic rants filled with righteous anger against people and situations that he feels are wrong or unjust. He displays just as much of an eye for the ladies as his friend Tod. And while he doesn't quite share Tod's penchant for serious romances, he has had a few of those on occasion himself. The prevailing, not-so-subtle "secret backstory" to Buz's character was that he was a TV refined replication of Jack Kerouac, or more accurately his "Sal Paradise" character from the similarly themed "On The Road" novel. This novel featured two characters, dark-haired and blonde, navigating odd adventures around the country from behind the wheel of a car. There was speculation Kerouc contemplated suing Stirling Silliphant and Chevrolet for misappropriating the characters and themes from his iconic "Road" novel.
