= SST: Death Flight =

1977 television film directed by David Lowell Rich

- Also known as: Death Flight; Flight of the Maiden; SST: Disaster in the Sky
- Screenplay by: Robert L. Joseph; Meyer Dolinsky
- Story by: Guerdon Trueblood
- Directed by: David Lowell Rich
- Starring: Barbara Anderson; Bert Convy; Peter Graves; Lorne Greene; Season Hubley; Tina Louise; George Maharis; Doug McClure; Burgess Meredith; Martin Milner; Brock Peters; Robert Reed; Susan Strasberg
- Composer: John Cacavas
- Country of origin: United States
- Original language: English

Production
- Producer: Ron Roth
- Cinematography: Joseph Biroc
- Editor: Pembroke J. Herring
- Running time: 93 minutes
- Production companies: ABC Circle Films

Original release
- Network: ABC
- Release: February 25, 1977

SST: Death Flight is a 1977 American disaster television film directed by David Lowell Rich. The film stars an ensemble cast including Barbara Anderson, Bert Convy, Peter Graves, Lorne Greene, Season Hubley, Tina Louise, George Maharis, Doug McClure, Burgess Meredith, Martin Milner, Brock Peters, Robert Reed, and Susan Strasberg. It follows a crippled supersonic transport (SST) that is refused permission to land due to the threat of spreading a deadly strain of influenza.

The teleplay was written by Robert L. Joseph and Meyer Dolinsky from a story by Guerdon Trueblood. David Lowell Rich also directed the airplane disaster films The Horror at 37,000 Feet and The Concorde... Airport '79.

== Plot ==
On the flight of Maiden 1, the first American supersonic transport, Captain Jim Walsh is the assigned pilot on an attempt to set a world speed record from New York to Paris. The flight crew includes the flight engineer, stewardess Mae and steward David. The select group on the ceremonial first flight include passengers and executives. On board is Willy Basset, the designer of the SST, Tim Vernon, the Cutlass Airlines head of publicity who is having an affair with "Miss SST" Angela Garland, the model who is the public face of the new aircraft. Hank Fairbanks, an ex-pilot who now works for an airline group in South America as an aircraft buyer, accompanies the other VIPs, and wants to renew an earlier romance with Mae. Other passengers include Paul Whitley, Bob Connors, former sportscaster Lyle Kingman and his wife Nancy. Harry Carter, a television broadcaster and a reporter are at the airport terminal to cover the festivities.

Unfortunately, disgruntled employee Les Phillips, wanting to get back at Basset, sabotages the hydraulic system, causing an inflight massive leak of hydraulic fluid. Subsequent repair attempts by the crew cause an explosive decompression that breaks open a medical shipment of Senegal Flu, brought aboard by Dr. Ralph Therman. Consequently, the aircraft is refused landing rights in Europe. The SST eventually tries to divert to Senegal (the only country with experience in dealing with the virus). However, there is not enough fuel and the pilots are forced to make an emergency landing in a mountain pass. Some of the passengers are killed, but most survive.

== Cast ==
The principal cast was listed in alphabetical order:

- Barbara Anderson as Carla Stanley
- Bert Convy as Tim Vernon
- Peter Graves as Paul Whitley
- Lorne Greene as Marshall Cole
- Season Hubley as Anne Redding
- Tina Louise as Mae
- George Maharis as Les Phillips
- Doug McClure as Hank Fairbanks
- Burgess Meredith as Willy Basset
- Martin Milner as Lyle Kingman
- Brock Peters as Dr. Ralph Therman
- Robert Reed as Captain Jim Walsh
- Susan Strasberg as Nancy Kingman
- Misty Rowe as Angela Garland
- Billy Crystal as David
- John de Lancie as Bob Connors
- Regis Philbin as Harry Carter
- Robert Ito as Flight Engineer Roy Nakamura
- Tom Stewart as First Officer Eric Brent
- Sherwood Price as Mickey
- Paul Napier as Eddy
- Tim Pelt as Linus
- Alain Patrick as Controller Girard
- Richard Derr as Governor Stensky
- Ric Carrott as Reporter
- Shawn Randall as Passenger
- Walter Maslow as Passenger
- Chrystie Jenner as Kathy

== Production ==
SST: Death Flight relied heavily on models of the canceled Lockheed SST prototype.

Poor production values predominated in SST: Death Flight. During filming, the production was called Flight of the Maiden. A major historical error was in depicting an American SST as the first of its kind. The aviation sequences utilized a scale model of what was basically a Concorde lookalike with Boeing 747 turbofan engines attached. Other shots were completed using a mock-up of a Lockheed L-2000, a prototype the company had created when Americans were still pursuing their own SST programs. (Note: The Boeing 2707 was also a contemporary SST program, that like the Lockheed entry, was eventually cancelled in 1971.) Airport scenes were filmed at the John F. Kennedy International Airport in New York, where various terminals, runways, boarding areas and cargo loading bays were featured.

== Reception ==
SST: Death Flight premiered on ABC as the Friday Night Movie on February 25, 1977, and subsequently went into syndication as SST: Disaster in the Sky. For its overseas showings, the film is titled simply Death Flight and has an additional scene featuring nudity that is not present in other versions. In its overseas theatrical showings, the film went by numerous titles including New York Parigi Air Sabotage 78 (New York–Paris, Air Sabotage 78) in Italy.

SST: Death Flight is noted for its formulaic plot and its poor production values. The television show Mystery Science Theater 3000, where characters watch "bad" movies along with the viewers and make jokes mocking the flaws, showed the film in 1989 during its first season, broadcast on Minneapolis–Saint Paul UHF channel KTMA (now WUCW).
