= Pete Kelly's Blues (song) =

Single by Ray Heindorf and the Warner Bros. Orchestra

from the album Songs from Pete Kelly's Blues
- B-side: "I Never Knew"
- Published: 1955
- Released: July 1955
- Recorded: 1955
- Genre: Blues
- Length: 3:41
- Label: Columbia
- Composer: Ray Heindorf
- Lyricist: Sammy Cahn
- Producer: Milt Gabler

"Pete Kelly's Blues" is a popular song featured in the movie of the same name. The music was written by Ray Heindorf, the lyrics by Sammy Cahn, and was performed in the film by Ella Fitzgerald and Ray Anthony. The song was published in 1955.

• Pete Kelly's Blues Columbia released 10 Jazz of the Roaring '20s songs from the 1955 Warner Bros. movie, plus the orchestral title track and an orchestral version of "I Never Knew." Both orchestral tracks were issued as a 45 rpm single on Columbia 40533. Orchestral recordings: Ray Heindorf directing the Warner Bros. Orchestra, Jazz recordings director: Matty Matlock. Cast: Matty Matlock; Dick Cathcart, Eddie Miller, Elmer Schneider, Nick Fatool, George Van Eps, Ray Sherman, Jud DeNaut (Columbia CL 690).

• An album of studio recordings by Peggy Lee & Ella Fitzgerald was issued in 1955. Contractual issues prevented the singers from appearing on the Columbia album. (Decca DL 8166).

• A soundtrack LP to the later TV series was issued in 1959 (Warner Bros W 1303).

• A later studio recording of the songs in the film was issued in 1958 (RCA Victor LPM-2053).

• Ella Fitzgerald rerecorded this song for her 1964 Verve release Hello, Dolly! with an arrangement by Frank DeVol.

• June Christy recorded the tune as a single (Capitol F3213) the tune is included as a bonus track on the CD reissue of her Something Cool album (Capitol Jazz).

• Bobby Darin recorded the tune for his 1959 album This is Darin (Atco SD 33-104).

== See also ==
- Pete Kelly's Blues (film)
- Pete Kelly's Blues (radio series)
- Pete Kelly's Blues (TV series)
- Songs from Pete Kelly's Blues
