= Route 66 (TV series) =

American crime drama television series (1960–1964)

- Genre: Adventure; Crime; Drama; Thriller
- Created by: Herbert B. Leonard; Stirling Silliphant
- Starring: Martin Milner; George Maharis; Glenn Corbett
- Theme music composer: Nelson Riddle
- Composers: Gil Grau; Nelson Riddle
- Country of origin: United States
- No. of seasons: 4
- No. of episodes: 116 (list of episodes)

Production
- Executive producer: Herbert B. Leonard
- Running time: approx. 51 mins. (per episode)
- Production companies: Lancer-Edling Productions; Screen Gems

Original release
- Network: CBS
- Release: October 7, 1960 – March 20, 1964

Route 66 is an American adventure crime drama television series that premiered on CBS on October 7, 1960, and ran until March 20, 1964, for a total of 116 episodes. The series was created by Herbert B. Leonard and Stirling Silliphant, who were also responsible for the ABC drama Naked City, from which Route 66 was an indirect spin-off. Both series employed a format with elements of both traditional drama and anthology drama, but the difference was where the shows were set: Naked City was set in New York City, while Route 66 had its setting change from week to week, with each episode being shot on location.

Route 66 follows two young men traversing the United States in a Chevrolet Corvette convertible, and the events and consequences surrounding their journeys. Martin Milner stars as Tod Stiles, a recent college graduate with no future prospects because of circumstances beyond his control. He is originally joined on his travels by Buz Murdock (played by George Maharis), a friend and former employee of his father's, with the character leaving midway through the third season after contracting echovirus. Near the end of the third season, Tod meets a recently discharged Vietnam veteran named Lincoln Case, played by Glenn Corbett, who decides to follow Tod on his travels and stays with him until the final episode.

== Format and characters ==
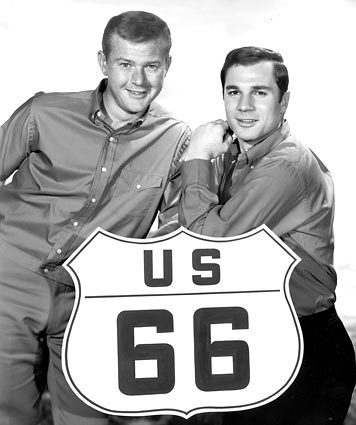
Martin Milner (left) and George Maharis, 1962

Route 66 is a hybrid between episodic television drama, which has continuing characters and situations, and the anthology format, in which each week's show has a completely different cast and story. In this narrative format, dubbed "semianthology" by the trade magazine Variety, the drama usually centers on the guest stars rather than the regular cast. Series creator Stirling Silliphant's concurrently running drama, Naked City (1958–1963), also followed this semianthology format.

=== Original concept and trial pilot ===
In the original concept under discussion between Silliphant and producer Leonard, the two series leads were to be ex-army men who had left the service and were looking to re-establish themselves in American life. George Maharis was signed to a contract by Leonard before the Route 66 concept had been fully developed, and was set to be a cast member from the beginning. Actor Robert Morris was set to be the other lead.

Morris was cast beside Maharis in a 1959 episode of Naked City that was written by Silliphant as a backdoor pilot to a potential spin-off series featuring two young travelers who were looking to find themselves. At that point, the Route 66 title was not yet decided upon, and the potential spin-off was tentatively entitled The Searchers. The Naked City episode that served as the Searchers pilot was called "Four Sweet Corners", and in it, Maharis played Johnny Gary, while Morris was Link Ridgeway. Both were ex-servicemen. After spending most of the episode rescuing Johnny's kid sister from a shoplifting ring, the two friends decides they are too restless to stay in New York City, and they want to see the world. They end the episode by leaving Johnny's family's apartment building, setting out for parts unknown.

The half-hour pilot and the chemistry between the leads was judged to be good by the producers, although Leonard could not interest a network or a sponsor in the spin-off show; Morris was replaced with Martin Milner for the reworked version that occurred before the death of Morris in May 1960 at age 25.

The concept was subsequently reworked. The title of the series became Route 66, the leads became Tod and Buz, and neither had ties to the army. Maharis was given the role of Buz, while Martin Milner beat several actors (including Robert Redford) for the role of Tod. Leonard personally financed the shooting of a new hour-long pilot episode ("Black November", written by Silliphant) and CBS picked up the series in 1960.

=== Character profiles ===
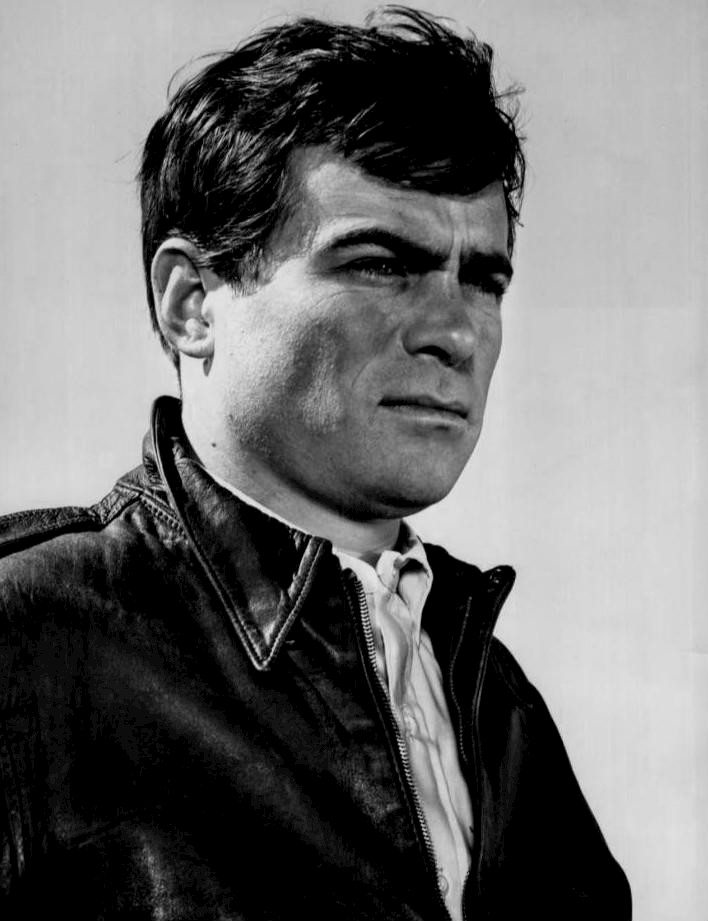
Glenn Corbett joined the series in 1963 as Lincoln "Linc" Case.

Tod and Buz (and later, Linc) symbolize restless youth searching for meaning in the early 1960s. The two men take odd jobs along their journey, like toiling in a California vineyard or manning a Maine lobster boat, bringing them in contact with dysfunctional families or troubled individuals in need of help. The lead characters are not always the focus of any given episode; in fact, many, many episodes focus primarily on the guest characters in that particular episode, with Tod and Buz (or Linc) being secondary players who act as a catalyst for the episode's events. Consequently, the backstories of the three main travelers are revealed only in occasional references across widely spaced episodes.

Tod Stiles, portrayed by clean-cut Milner, is the epitome of the decent, honest, all-American type. Tod comes from a background of wealth and privilege; his father owned a shipping company, and Tod's early years were spent in New York and Connecticut. He attended Yale, but after the death of his father, Tod discovered that his father's business had essentially gone bankrupt. The only legacy left to Tod is a new Corvette.

Buz Murdock, meanwhile, is an orphan who had worked with Tod's father as a laborer on one of his barges in New York City. After the death of the senior Mr. Stiles, and the subsequent collapse of his business, Tod and Buz decide to drive across America in search of work, adventure, and themselves. The working-class Buz (George Maharis) is looser, hipper, and more Beat Generation in attitude than Tod, though the two characters share a mutual respect. Subtle indications were given that the Buz character was intended to loosely embody Jack Kerouac in appearance and attitude. Kerouac, in fact, contemplated a lawsuit against Leonard, Silliphant, and Chevrolet for misappropriating the characters and theme from his iconic novel On the Road.

Toward the end of the second season, Maharis was absent for several episodes, due to a bout of infectious hepatitis. He returned for the start of the third season, but was again absent for a number of episodes before leaving the show entirely midway through season three. Consequently, in numerous episodes in late season two and early season three, Tod travels solo, while Buz is said to be in the hospital with "echovirus". Tod is often seen writing to Buz in these episodes or having a one-sided phone conversation with him. Tod appears solo in 13 episodes.

Buz made his final appearance in a January 1963 episode, and was then out of the show without a definitive explanation; the character simply stopped appearing, and was never referenced again. After five consecutive solo Tod stories, Tod gains a new traveling companion named Lincoln "Linc" Case (Glenn Corbett) in March 1963. Case is a United States Army veteran of the Vietnam conflict, haunted by his past. Tod meets Linc in "Fifty Miles From Home", in which Linc fights with an aspiring basketball player outside a Houston bus station. Linc severely injures the young man, whom Tod was coaching and training, and the incensed Tod follows Linc to his hometown, where he challenges him to a fistfight. After the fight, the two come to an understanding of where Linc has been in life, and Linc becomes Tod's new traveling companion. Linc is more introspective than the often extroverted Buz, but he has (like Buz) a sometimes explosive temper. Linc is nonetheless a reliable companion as the duo continued their travels.

The series concludes in Tampa, Florida, with the two-part episode "Where There's a Will, There's a Way", in which Tod Stiles marries a Houston commodities trader (played by guest-star Barbara Eden), and Linc announces his intention to return home to his family in Texas after a long period of estrangement from his father. Tod and his new wife head back to Houston and offer to take Linc, who has to remind Tod how small the car is. The scene ends with Linc walking up a hill after loading the couple's luggage into the Corvette. This episode made the series one of the earlier primetime television dramas to have a planned series finale resolving the fate of its main characters. The show was filmed and presented in black and white throughout its run.

== Locations ==
Route 66 shot each episode on location around the country. Writer-producer Stirling Silliphant traveled with location manager Sam Manners to a wide range of locales, and wrote scripts to match the settings. The actors and film crew would arrive some time later. Locations included a logging camp, shrimp boats, an offshore oil rig, Riverside Raceway, and Glen Canyon Dam, the latter while still under construction.

The show had little connection with the U.S. Highway providing its name. Most of the locations were far from "The Mother Road", which passed through only eight states, while the series was filmed in 25 American states (and even had an episode in Toronto, Canada). Another episode features a brief coda set in Mexico, but was filmed in California. U.S. Route 66, the highway, was briefly referred to in just three early episodes of the series ("Black November", "Play It Glissando", and "An Absence of Tears"). The actual highway is even more rarely shown, as in the early first-season episode, "The Strengthening Angels".

Route 66 is one of few television series to be filmed entirely on the road. People, their accents, livelihoods, ethnic backgrounds, and attitudes varied widely from one location to the next.

== Cars ==
The Chevrolet Corvette seen in the first episode ("Black November", October 7, 1960) is a 1960 model; for the rest of that season the show used a 1961 model. Chevrolet provided vehicles throughout the show's run, upgrading to new models with each season. Although a few publicity photos show a black or red model, for actual filming the entire black-and-white series used Corvettes in light colors such as Horizon Blue, Cascade Green, and Fawn Beige. The 1963 Corvette Sting Ray convertible (in Saddle Tan) finished the show out through 1964. During the show's final, 1963–64 season, a 1963 model Corvette was used initially, but was replaced by an updated 1964 model part way into the season.

== Guest stars ==
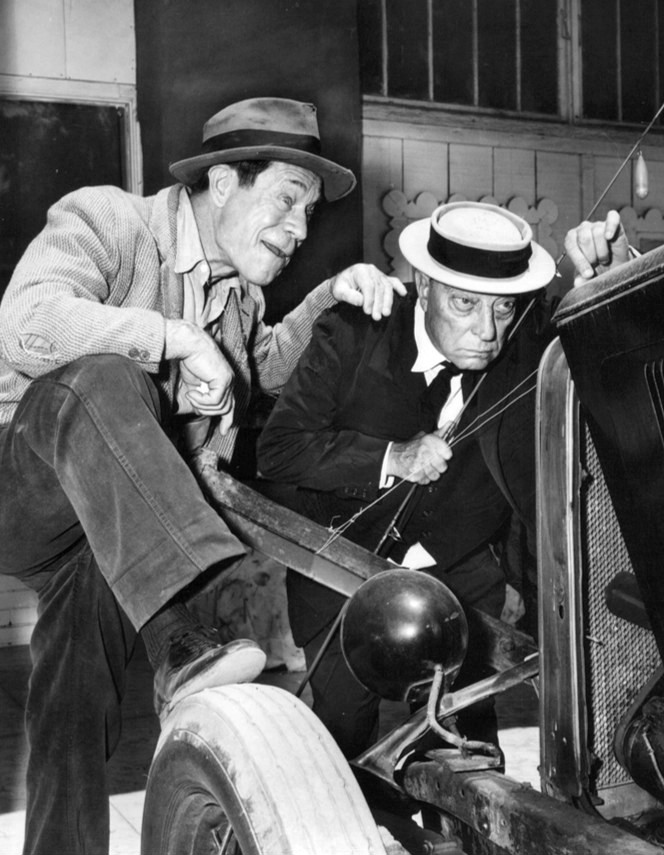
Joe E. Brown and Buster Keaton in "Journey to Nineveh" (1962)

The roster of guest stars on Route 66 includes numerous actors who later went on to fame, as well as major stars on the downside of their careers. One of the most historically significant episodes of the series in this respect was "Lizard's Leg and Owlet's Wing" featuring Peter Lorre, Lon Chaney Jr., and Boris Karloff as themselves, with the latter donning his famous Frankenstein monster make-up for the first time in decades and Chaney Jr. made up to resemble his 1941 role as the Wolf Man. Joe E. Brown and Buster Keaton also appeared together as the leads in an episode mixing comedy and drama titled "Journey to Ninevah".

An episode featuring Ethel Waters also guest-starred Juano Hernandez, as well as the fictional five-piece Memphis Naturals band, made up of actors Bill Gunn and Frederick O'Neal and real-life musicians Coleman Hawkins, Roy Eldridge, and Jo Jones.

Other guest actors (including some old and future stars) included Edward Andrews, Lou Antonio, Elizabeth Ashley, Ed Asner, Lew Ayres, Diane Baker, Martin Balsam, Ed Begley, Harry Bellaver, Theodore Bikel, Whit Bissell, Beulah Bondi, Tom Bosley, Edgar Buchanan, James Caan, James Coburn, Alex Cord, Joan Crawford, Keir Dullea, James Dunn, Robert Duvall, Barbara Eden, Gene Evans, Betty Field, Nina Foch, Rosemary Forsyth, Anne Francis, Peter Graves, Tammy Grimes, Signe Hasso, Sessue Hayakawa, Joey Heatherton, Steven Hill, Miriam Hopkins, David Janssen, Ben Johnson, George Kennedy (playing the first heavy in the first episode), Susan Kohner, Cloris Leachman, Robert Loggia, Jack Lord, Tina Louise, Dorothy Malone, E. G. Marshall, Lee Marvin, Walter Matthau, Patty McCormack, Darren McGavin, Ralph Meeker, Vera Miles, Roger Mobley, Chester Morris, Richard Mulligan, J. Carrol Naish, Lane Nakano, Lois Nettleton, Julie Newmar, Leslie Nielsen, Arthur O'Connell, Susan Oliver, Nehemiah Persoff, Slim Pickens, Suzanne Pleshette, Stefanie Powers, Robert Redford, Ruth Roman, Marion Ross, Janice Rule, Soupy Sales, Martha Scott, Martin Sheen, Sylvia Sidney, Lois Smith, Rod Steiger, Inger Stevens, Beatrice Straight, Rip Torn, Jo Van Fleet, Jessica Walter, Jack Warden, Tuesday Weld, Jack Weston, James Whitmore, and Dick York.

William Shatner and DeForest Kelley, both of whom went on to fame starring in the Star Trek TV series and films, also guest-starred, in separate episodes. Kelley was in "1800 Days to Justice", Shatner was in "Build Your Houses with Their Backs to the Sea".

In "What a Shining Young Man Was Our Gallant Lieutenant", Kent McCord (credited as Kent McWhirter) appears as a police officer, a precursor to his career-defining role as Jim Reed on Adam-12 in which Martin Milner starred as Pete Malloy.

Two late third-season episodes, which aired one week apart, each featured a guest star in a bit part playing a character with a profession with which he would later become associated as the star of his own mega-hit television series. In "Shadows of an Afternoon", Michael Conrad was a uniformed policeman, years before he became famous as Police Sgt. Phil Esterhaus on Hill Street Blues.

In "Soda Pop and Paper Flags", Alan Alda guest-starred as a surgeon, a precursor to his career-defining role as Dr. Benjamin Franklin "Hawkeye" Pierce on M*A*S*H. Also in the first-season episode, "The Strengthening Angels", which aired November 4, 1960, Hal Smith, who played town drunk Otis Campbell in The Andy Griffith Show, also played a drunk named Howard and was listed in the credits as "Drunk".

A fourth-season episode, "Is It True There Are Poxies at the Bottom of Landfair Lake?", featured guest stars Geoffrey Horne and Collin Wilcox. In the episode's storyline, Wilcox's character pretended to marry Horne's, although it turned out to be a practical joke. A few years after appearing in this episode, Horne and Wilcox were married to each other in real life.

An in-joke occurs during the fourth-season episode "Where Are the Sounds of Celli Brahams?" In this segment, Horace McMahon guest-stars as a Minneapolis, Minnesota, festival promoter. His character confesses to Linc his failed ambition to be a policeman. Linc remarks that he resembles a policeman Linc once knew in New York City. McMahon had starred as Lt. Mike Parker from 1958 to 1963 on the New York-based police drama Naked City, another series created by Silliphant and Leonard.

== Production notes ==
- The original working title of the series was The Searchers. That was the title of the 1956 film The Searchers directed by John Ford and starring John Wayne, so the series was renamed.
- The episode "I'm Here to Kill a King" about a potential assassination, was originally scheduled to air on November 29, 1963. It was removed from the schedule because of President John F. Kennedy's assassination one week earlier, and was not aired until March 20, 1964. This episode was filmed and set in Niagara Falls, New York, but also features a few shots taken in Niagara Falls, Ontario, Canada. This episode and "A Long Way from St. Louie" (which was set and filmed entirely in Toronto) are the only episodes of Route 66 featuring footage filmed outside the United States.

== Scripts ==
Route 66 was officially created by producer Herbert B. Leonard and writer Stirling Silliphant; Silliphant wrote the majority of the episodes (including the pilot) while Leonard did not write at all. It was notable for its dark storylines and exceptional realism. Tod and Buz frequently became involved with individuals whose almost nihilistic worldview made for occasionally frightening TV. Some 50 years after its premiere, Route 66 is still one of the few TV series to offer such a range of socially conscious stories, including mercy killing, the threat of nuclear annihilation, terrorism, runaways, and orphans. Other episodes dealt with the mentally ill, lupus, drug addiction, or gang violence.

Some stories were lighthearted, such as a memorable episode featuring Richard Basehart as a folklorist trying to record the music of an isolated Appalachian community, and a Halloween episode called "Lizard's Leg and Owlet's Wing". One of the last episodes (113/116) was outright slapstick comedy (with even a pie fight), costarring Soupy Sales, and entitled "This Is Going to Hurt Me More Than It Hurts You".

== Theme song ==
"Route 66 Theme"

Single by Nelson Riddle

from the album Route 66 Theme and Other Great TV Themes
- B-side: "Lolita Ya Ya"
- Released: April 1962
- Recorded: 1962
- Genre: Television theme music
- Length: 2:07
- Label: Capitol
- Songwriter: Nelson Riddle
- Producer: Tom Morgan

Nelson Riddle was commissioned at short notice to write the instrumental theme when CBS decided to have a new song, rather than negotiating royalties for the Bobby Troup song "(Get Your Kicks on) Route 66."

Riddle's "Route 66 Theme" instrumental was one of the first television themes to make Billboard magazine's top 30, following Ray Anthony's "Dragnet Theme" (in 1953), Anthony's version of Henry Mancini's "Peter Gunn Theme" (in 1959) and Mancini's "Mr. Lucky Theme" (in 1960). The song earned two Grammy nominations in 1962.

Billy Vaughn recorded a version of Riddle's theme (also instrumental, but with a wordless vocal chorus contributing to the melody) for his 1962 album Chapel by the Sea. A vocal version, retitled "Open Highway" and featuring lyrics by Stanley Styne, was recorded by jazz singer Teri Thornton and reached number 150 in the Music Vendor survey of October 1963.

== Awards and nominations ==
In 1962, Ethel Waters, playing Jenny Henderson in the "Goodnight, Sweet Blues" episode, was nominated for a Primetime Emmy Award for Outstanding Single Performance by an Actress in a Leading Role, making her the first African-American performer, male or female, to receive one for dramatic performance. Also in 1962, George Maharis was nominated for Outstanding Continued Performance by an Actor in a Series (Best Actor) for his role as Buz. In 1963, the Writers Guild of America presented writer Larry Marcus the Best Episodic Drama award for his screenplay for the episode "Man Out of Time".

== Broadcast history ==
Route 66 aired Fridays at 8:30–9:30 pm EST on CBS its entire run.

== Episodes ==
Season	Episodes	Originally released	
Season	Episodes	First released	Last released
1	30	October 7, 1960	June 16, 1961
2	32	September 22, 1961	June 1, 1962
3	31	September 21, 1962	May 24, 1963
4	23	September 27, 1963	March 20, 1964

== Home media ==
Roxbury Entertainment released the first three seasons of Route 66 on DVD in Region 1 between 2008 and 2010. On November 7, 2011, Shout! Factory announced that it had acquired the exclusive rights to the series, including the home entertainment rights. It planned on releasing the series through multiple platforms, including DVD releases. It subsequently announced that it would release Route 66—The Complete Series on DVD in Region 1 on May 22, 2012. The 24-disc collectors box set would feature all 116 episodes of the series, as well as special bonus features.

Title	Ep #	Release date
Complete First Season	30	August 5, 2008
Complete Second Season	32	October 21, 2008
Season Three, Volume One	16	July 21, 2009
Season Three, Volume Two	15	October 20, 2009
Complete Third Season	31	January 12, 2010
Complete Fourth Season	23	April 2, 2013
The Complete Series	116	May 22, 2012

== Cultural impact ==
- The series was parodied in the April 1962 issue of Mad as "Route 67". The parody features an appearance by the character Mary Worth, who chides the boys for trying to usurp her role as the nation's chief do-gooder.
- According to biographer Dennis McNally (Desolate Angel: Jack Kerouac, The Beat Generation, and America), Jack Kerouac tried to sue the show's producer Stirling Silliphant, claiming that it plagiarized his novel On the Road, which also featured two buddies traveling America's byways in search of adventure. McNally said Kerouac was "appalled by the show's violence," but the lawyers he contacted convinced him that he could never win a lawsuit.
- Route 66 was featured on the cover of TV Guide four times.
- In a 1963 episode of the situation comedy Leave It to Beaver, the character Eddie Haskell obtains a summer job on an Alaskan fishing boat and likens himself to "the guys on Route 66."
- In a 1977 episode of SCTV a space-age satire of the show called Galaxy 66 stars Joe Flaherty and Dave Thomas as Micron and Antar, two guys who prowl the galaxies looking for adventure, and find it when a mutant thug (John Candy) accosts a human girl (Catherine O'Hara), whom they rescue. Later on in the show, they are seen at the end of another skit tying pyramids to their heads to keep from being hit by meteoroids.
- In the Alien Nation episode "Gimmee, Gimmee" (April 9, 1990), Albert gives Matt a vintage Corvette, whereupon the series theme by Nelson Riddle is heard.
- Martin Milner toured the real Route 66 for the 1998 video production Route 66: Return to the Road with Martin Milner, a US International Film Festival gold medal winner.

== Sequel ==
A revival/sequel to the original Route 66 aired on NBC in 1993. Premiering on June 8 of that year, the premise of the series was that an illegitimate son of Buz, Nick Lewis (James Wilder), had inherited a Corvette from his father. Using it to travel the country, he picked up a hitchhiker named Arthur Clark (Dan Cortese) and he became his traveling partner. NBC aired only four episodes before cancelling the revival due to low ratings. A pilot featuring different casting was also produced.

== Notes ==
- Actor interviews, aired on Nick at Nite, 1986
- Steinberg, Cobbit S. TV Facts. New York: Facts on File, 1980. ISBN 0-87196-312-4
