= Going Home (1971 film) =

1971 film by Herbert B. Leonard

- Theatrical release poster
- Directed by: Herbert B. Leonard
- Screenplay by: Lawrence B. Marcus
- Produced by: Herbert B. Leonard
- Starring: Robert Mitchum; Brenda Vaccaro
- Cinematography: Fred Jackman Jr.
- Edited by: Sigmund Neufeld Jr.
- Music by: Bill Walker
- Production companies: Herbert B. Leonard Productions; Metro-Goldwyn-Mayer
- Distributed by: Metro-Goldwyn-Mayer
- Release date: 1 December 1971
- Running time: 97 minutes
- Country: United States
- Language: English

Going Home is a 1971 American drama film directed by Herbert B. Leonard and starring Robert Mitchum, Brenda Vaccaro and Jan-Michael Vincent, who was nominated for a Golden Globe award for best supporting actor.

== Plot ==
Harry Graham is a lonely and beaten-down man who has recently been released from prison after serving time for murdering his wife 13 years earlier. His son, Jimmy, who witnessed the slaying as a child, is still haunted by the crime and wants to confront his father about it. Jimmy tracks Harry to a run-down seashore community and finds him living in a trailer park with his girlfriend Jenny. It's clear that Jimmy himself is dealing with serious psychological problems, and the father-son reunion leads to sometimes grim complications.

== Cast ==
- Robert Mitchum as Harry K. Graham
- Brenda Vaccaro as Jenny Benson
- Jan-Michael Vincent as Jimmy Graham
- Sally Kirkland as Ann
- Josh Mostel as Mr. Bonelli
- George Mathews as Mr. Malloy
- Mary Louise Wilson as Mrs. Green

== Critical reception ==
Vincent Canby of The New York Times did not care for the film although he praised its intelligence and some of the actors:

Going Home, which opened yesterday at the Victoria and other theaters around town, is an exceedingly nasty movie... Even worse is Mr. Marcus's explanation of why the father, played by Robert Mitchum as if he were a high school football coach, took the knife to his wife in the first place: He was drunk.... Going Home is more objectionable, more pernicious, than other, much dumber movies because it appears to have some surface intelligence... Mitchum has reached that point in his career where he doesn't seem to act as much as inhabit whatever film he's in,... I also liked Brenda Vaccaro as his mistress... Unfortunately, Jan-Michael Vincent is impossible as the son, admittedly an impossible role that requires the actor to be simultaneously appealing and psychotic. He's very handsome and very young and he has a lot to learn about acting, including how to hiccup with conviction.

Roger Ebert of The Chicago Sun-Times did not care for the film and gave it 2 out of 4 stars:

Going Home is a fairly awful melodrama that's worth seeing primarily for the presence of Robert Mitchum. Not that he's especially good. Mitchum can't be described as good or bad in most of his performances. It's just that he's there, the kind of screen presence that draws your attention.... And no mistake about it, Going Home is bad.

== See also ==
- List of American films of 1971
