= Peter Kelly (Scottish footballer) =

Scottish footballer

Personal information
- Full name: Peter Anthony Kelly
- Date of birth: 6 December 1956 (age 69)
- Place of birth: Glasgow, Scotland
- Height: 5 ft 9 in (1.75 m)
- Position: Full-back

Youth career
- 1973–1974: Newcastle United U18

Senior career*
Years	Team	Apps	(Gls)
1974–1980	Newcastle United	36	(0)
- * Club domestic league appearances and goals

Peter Kelly (born 6 December 1956) is a Scottish former professional footballer who played as a full-back for Newcastle United. He was a quick and strong defender, noted for his powerful tackling abilities despite his slight build.

An attacking full-back, Peter established a regular berth in the Newcastle team from the start of the 1978–79 season but suffered a serious cruciate ligament injury in November 1979.

He returned at the start of the 1980–81 season and made nine appearances until a re-occurrence of the prior injury problems brought a premature end to his career

Following Kelly's final game in October 1980, manager Arthur Cox sought to refresh his side for their next game, handing debuts to Chris Withe and an as-then relatively unknown Chris Waddle.
