= Pete Kelly's Blues (TV series) =

Television series

- Starring: William Reynolds
- Country of origin: United States
- Original language: English
- No. of seasons: 1
- No. of episodes: 13

Production
- Running time: 30 minutes

Original release
- Network: NBC
- Release: April 5 – July 5, 1959

Pete Kelly's Blues is a television series starring William Reynolds which aired in 1959. It was created by Jack Webb, based on his 1951 radio series of the same name and the subsequent film version, Pete Kelly's Blues, from 1955.

== Synopsis ==
Set in Kansas City during the 1920s, the series centered on Pete Kelly, a trumpet player and the leader of Pete Kelly's Original Big Seven Big. Dixieland trumpet player, Dick Cathcart, who's best known as a member of The Lawrence Welk Show, was dubbed in for the actual playing of Kelly's trumpet.

== Cast ==
- William Reynolds as Pete Kelly
- Connee Boswell as Savannah Brown
- Than Wyenn as George Lupo (Lupo was frequently mention in the radio series, but never actually appeared; Wyenn did play a different character in the movie version.)
- Phil Gordon as Fred
- Fred Eisley as Johnny Cassiano

== Episodes ==
No.	Title	Original release date
1	"The Steve Porter Story"	April 5, 1959
Kelly gets involved in a murder after a vocalist asks him to help a musician.
2	"The June Gould Story"	April 12, 1959
Kelly searches for a missing nightclub singer, the daughter of a gentle elderly woman.
3	"The Envelope Story"	April 19, 1959
A mysterious envelope triggers a chain of events including a double cross and also holds a clue to an altar boy's killer.
4	"The Poor Butterfly Story"	April 26, 1959
A jazz recording becomes the object of a mysterious search that results in murder.
5	"The Tex Bigelow Story"	May 10, 1959
Kelly witnesses a murder and comes face to face with a ghost as consequences of a request made of him by a dying man.
6	"The Baby Ray Story"	May 17, 1959
Kelly receives a basket of bread, then quickly realizes it also contains a newborn baby.
7	"The Mike Reegan Story"	May 24, 1959
Both a mobster and police accuse Kelly of murdering the mobster's wife.
8	"The Rompy Thompson Story"	May 31, 1959
A down-and-out trombone player becomes a target of gangsters' bullets.
9	"The Gus Trudo Story"	June 7, 1959
Kelly is informed by a detective that an old friend is being stalked by hoodlums.
10	"The Emory Cusack Story"	June 14, 1959
A fake raid by bogus federal agents appears to threaten arrest for Lupo, but proves to be a cover-up for murder.
11	"The Fitzhugh Story"	June 21, 1959
Two racketeers force Lupo to install a juke box in his speakeasy.
12	"The Joe Artevekian Story"	June 28, 1959
After Pete buys a "health machine" from a hoodlum, Lupo nearly gets blown up in a plot to intimidate him into selling his speakeasy.
13	"The 16-Bar Tacet"	July 5, 1959
The new operators of Lupo's speakeasy offer Pete and his Big Seven a job, but he bows out.
