= Herbert B. Leonard =

American film producer

- Born: Herbert Breiter Leonard; October 8, 1922; New York City, U.S.
- Died: October 14, 2006 (aged 84); Los Angeles, California, U.S.
- Other name: Bert Leonard
- Education: New York University
- Occupations: Producer, writer
- Years active: 1940s-1993
- Spouses: Laura Williamson Freidlander (m. 1947, divorced) Willetta Cleo Smith (m. 1954; div. 1969) Jenny P. Cobb (m. 1971; div. 1984) Betty Pearl Kennedy (m. 1984, divorced): Betty Pearl Kennedy (remarried)
- Children: 6

Herbert Breiter Leonard (October 8, 1922 – October 14, 2006) was an American producer and writer. Leonard was a production manager at Screen Gems for many years.

Leonard produced and was the production manager for many of the television shows produced for Screen Gems which included The Adventures of Rin Tin Tin, Circus Boy, Naked City, and Route 66.

== Early life ==
Leonard was born on October 8, 1922, in New York, New York, the younger of two sons of Morton and Rhoda Leonard. His older brother was Roger Kallman Leonard. His parents were both Jewish. He went to New York University in which he played football. Shortly after he graduated from New York University, he was drafted into the military where he served during the Second World War. He was a pilot and instructor in the United States Navy.

== Career ==
In 1946 Leonard moved to Hollywood. Although his uncle was Nate Spingold, an executive at Columbia Pictures, Leonard preferred not to ask him for a job at the studio. Instead, he got an entry-level job with Columbia producer Sam Katzman. When a production manager suddenly died in 1949, Katzman asked Leonard to take over the job and finish the movie. "Over the next four years," writes author Susan Orlean, "he managed the production of 80 more Katzman movies. He made himself indispensable to Katzman, who wanted him to stay at the studio forever." Leonard studied Katzman's shrewd production methods, which economized at every turn: crowd scenes would be filmed first, then many of the actors would be dismissed; the remaining featured players would perform their scenes, and then leave; until finally only the two or three leads were still on the payroll, working with a few recognizable bit players.

Leonard pitched an idea for a TV series starring the canine star Rin Tin Tin. Screen Gems, Columbia's TV subsidiary, accepted it and Leonard became its producer, leaving Katzman. The Adventures of Rin Tin Tin ran from 1954 to 1959. Rin Tin Tin became an instant hit with children. Another of Leonard's TV successes was Circus Boy (starring young Micky Dolenz, then billed as Mickey Braddock), about a boy named Corky raised by a clown and his family.

After Circus Boy ended its run in 1957, Leonard moved on to more serious shows. Leonard became a household name when Naked City premiered on ABC Television the next year. Naked City, adapted from the 1948 movie The Naked City, aired for four seasons during 1958-1959 and 1960-1963. Most of the first season was written by Stirling Silliphant, with later seasons adding Howard Rodman and others to the writing staff. The episodes, which followed two fictional New York City detectives, were shot on location throughout New York City, something that was rarely done for television in the 1960s, and its stark urban realism sometimes approached that of cinéma vérité. For the first season, the show's never-seen narrator identified himself on-air as "Bert Leonard," claiming to be producer Herbert B. Leonard (and thereby making Leonard's name mildly recognizable amongst TV viewers). In fact, the narration was voiced by Lawrence Dobkin. Dobkin continued as narrator for the rest of the show's run, but the conceit of the narrator being Leonard was dropped after season 1.

Leonard's other major success as a producer was with another Stirling Silliphant scripted project. Route 66, which began in 1960 on CBS, followed two men in a Chevrolet Corvette around the United States. Each week, until the series ended in 1964, they encountered a different town and a different story. It was also shot on location around the United States in about 25 states, although only occasionally on the actual Route 66. A romance of the road that emphasized a sense of rootlessness, it stood out from many of the dramas and situation comedies that were its contemporaries.

Leonard also produced several films. Among Leonard's movie credits are Popi, a 1969 comedy-drama directed by Arthur Hiller and starring Alan Arkin. Leonard also produced and co-directed The Perils of Pauline, a 1967 comedy starring Pat Boone; and he produced and directed Going Home, a 1971 drama starring Robert Mitchum. Leonard retired from show business in 1993.

== Personal life ==
Leonard was married five times. He was 25 when he married his first wife in 1947. Laura Friedlander (nee Williamson) was a divorcée from Georgia with two young children. His second wife Willetta Smith began her career in Hollywood as an actress and choreographer and was Leonard's production assistant on both Naked City and Route 66 and associate producer on "The Perils of Pauline" movie he produced in 1967. Leonard had two daughters with Willetta Smith, two daughters with his third wife Jenny P. Cobb and two daughters with his last wife Betty Pearl Kennedy whom he met during the production of Ladies' Man in 1980. Leonard married Kennedy twice.

Leonard was diagnosed with throat cancer in 2003. He lost his larynx and eventually the ability to speak due to the disease. Leonard succumbed to the disease and died in his daughter Gina's Los Angeles home on October 14, 2006, six days after his 84th birthday. At the time of his death, Leonard had six daughters and three grandchildren. He was predeceased by his son Steven Breiter Leonard in 1955. A memorial service was held for Leonard on October 20 at the Old North Church inside Forest Lawn – Hollywood Hills in Hollywood Hills, California where he was buried.
