= Dick Cathcart =

American Dixieland trumpet player

- Born: November 6, 1924; Michigan City, Indiana, U.S.
- Died: November 8, 1993 (aged 69) Los Angeles, California
- Genres: Jazz, dixieland, big band, easy listening
- Occupation: Musician
- Instruments: Trumpet, cornet

Charles Richard Cathcart (November 6, 1924 – November 8, 1993) was an American Dixieland trumpet player who was best known as a member of The Lawrence Welk Show in which he appeared from 1962 to 1968.

Cathcart was born in Michigan City, Indiana, United States. He was a trumpeter for the U.S. Army Air Force Band and a member of big bands led by Bob Crosby, Ben Pollack, and Ray Noble.

After World War II, he moved to Los Angeles. His friend Jack Webb was playing the part of trumpeter Pete Kelly in the movie Pete Kelly's Blues and told Cathcart he should supply the music. The band from the movie stayed together in the 1950s for performances and recordings under the name Pete Kelly's Big Seven. Cathcart also supplied music for the TV show Dragnet, which starred Jack Webb as Joe Friday. He spent much of his career as a musician on The Lawrence Welk Show. On the Welk show, he met Peggy Lennon, a singer with the Lennon Sisters, and the two married.

== Filmography ==
Year	Title	Role	Notes
1954	Dragnet	Roy Cleaver	
1955	Pete Kelly's Blues	Trumpet Player / Webb's Cornet Double	Uncredited
1956	Battle Stations	Eddie	Uncredited
1959	-30-		
1961	The Last Time I Saw Archie	Soldier	Uncredited, (final film role)
