= Songs from Pete Kelly's Blues =

Studio album by Peggy Lee with Ella Fitzgerald
- Released: 1955
- Genre: Vocal jazz
- Length: 38:27
- Label: Decca
- Producer: Milt Gabler

Peggy Lee with Ella Fitzgerald chronology
Songs in an Intimate Style (1954)	Songs from Pete Kelly's Blues (1955)	Black Coffee (1956)

Professional ratings
Review scores
Source	Rating
Allmusic	3/5 stars

Songs from Pete Kelly's Blues is an album by jazz singer Peggy Lee that contains songs from the film Pete Kelly's Blues (1955). Lee starred in the film and re-recorded some of the songs for this album. This album should not be confused with the soundtrack. Lee was nominated for Best Supporting Actress at the Academy Awards for her portrayal of a troubled singer. Given that the film occurs in the 1920s, the album is a combination of Dixieland and 1950s swing with help from jazz singer Ella Fitzgerald.

== Track listing ==
1. Opening: Narration by Jack Webb – 1:21
2. "Smiles" (J. Will Callahan, Lee Roberts) – 2:14
3. "(What Can I Say) After I Say I'm Sorry?" (Walter Donaldson, Abe Lyman) – 3:44
4. "Breezin' Along with the Breeze" (Haven Gillespie, Seymour Simons, Richard A. Whiting) – 2:45
5. "Oh! Didn't He Ramble" – 2:49
6. "I'm Gonna Meet My Sweetie Now" (Benny Davis, Jesse Greer) – 2:34
7. "Somebody Loves Me" (George Gershwin, Buddy DeSylva, Ballard MacDonald) – 3:39
8. "Sugar" (Maceo Pinkard, Sidney D. Mitchell, Edna Alexander) – 3:07
9. "Bye Bye Blackbird" (Mort Dixon, Ray Henderson) – 2:50
10. "He Needs Me" (Arthur Hamilton)
11. "I Never Knew" (Gus Kahn, Ted Fiorito)
12. "Sing a Rainbow" (Arthur Hamilton)
13. "I Never Knew" – 2:58
14. "Hard Hearted Hannah" (Milton Ager, Chas Bates, Bob Bigelow, Jack Yellen – 3:08
15. "Pete Kelly's Blues" (Ray Heindorf, Sammy Cahn) – 3:41
