= Martin Milner =

American actor (1931–2015)

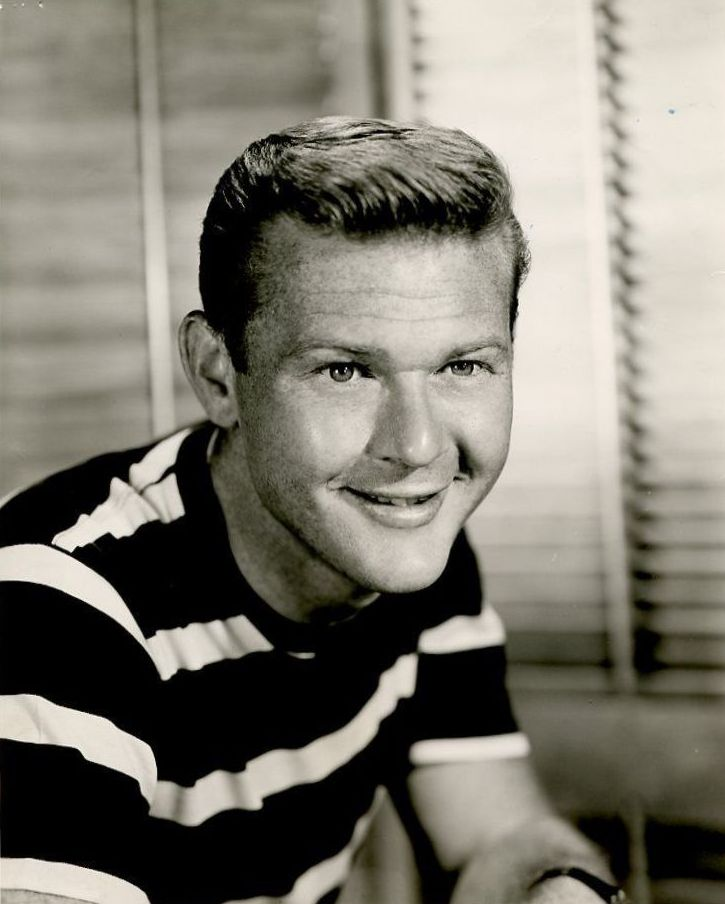
- Milner in 1960
- Born: Martin Sam Milner; December 28, 1931; Detroit, Michigan, U.S.
- Died: September 6, 2015 (aged 83); Carlsbad, California, U.S.
- Education: University of Southern California
- Occupation: Actor
- Years active: 1947–1998
- Spouse: Judith Bess "Judy" Jones (m. 1957)
- Children: 4

Martin Sam Milner (December 28, 1931 – September 6, 2015) was an American actor. He was best known for his starring roles on two popular television series, as Tod Stiles on Route 66 (1960–64) and as Officer Pete Malloy on Adam-12 (1968–75).

== Early years ==
Milner was born on December 28, 1931, in Detroit, Michigan, the son of Mildred (née Martin), a Paramount Theater circuit dancer, and Sam Gordon Milner, who worked as a construction hand and later a film distributor. Sam was a Polish-Jewish immigrant. The family left Detroit when Milner was a young child, moved frequently, and settled in Seattle, Washington, by the time he was nine. There, he became involved in acting, first in school, and then in a children's theater group at the Cornish Playhouse.

When Milner was a teenager, he moved with his family to Los Angeles, where his parents hired an acting coach and later an agent for him. Milner had his first screen test and began his film career with his debut in the Warner Bros. film Life with Father (1947). Less than two weeks after that film was completed in August 1946, Milner contracted polio. He recovered within a year and had bit parts in two more films, then was graduated from North Hollywood High School in 1949. He immediately landed a minor role in the film Sands of Iwo Jima starring John Wayne.

== Career ==
In 1947, at the age of 14, Milner made his film debut in Life with Father starring William Powell. Milner played Powell’s middle son in the movie.

Milner attended the University of Southern California, where he studied theater. He dropped out after a year in the fall of 1950 to concentrate on acting. He made his first television appearance in 1950 as a guest star in episode 28, "Pay Dirt", of The Lone Ranger. The same year, he began a recurring role as Drexel Potter on the sitcom The Stu Erwin Show.

He had several more roles, both minor and major, in war films in the 1950s, including another John Wayne picture titled Operation Pacific (1951) and Mister Roberts (1955), with William Powell, Henry Fonda, James Cagney, and Jack Lemmon. On the set of Halls of Montezuma (1950), he met and befriended actor Jack Webb, and he began intermittent work on Webb's radio series Dragnet.

In 1952, Milner began a two-year stint in the United States Army. Assigned to Special Services at Fort Ord on California's Monterey Bay Peninsula, he directed training films and was both a master of ceremonies and performer in skits for a touring unit created to entertain soldiers. Milner was encouraged by fellow soldier and future actor David Janssen to pursue an acting career when his time in the Army ended. Janssen and Milner served at Fort Ord with fellow future actors Clint Eastwood and Richard Long. While in the Army, Milner continued working for Jack Webb, playing Officer Bill Lockwood (briefly the partner of Sgt. Friday) and other characters on the Dragnet radio series on weekends. He also appeared on six episodes of Webb's Dragnet television series between 1952 and 1955.

After his military service ended, Milner had a recurring role on The Life of Riley from 1953 to 1958. He also made guest appearances on numerous television shows, including episodes of The Bigelow Theatre, The Great Gildersleeve, TV Reader's Digest, Science Fiction Theatre, Westinghouse Desilu Playhouse, NBC Matinee Theater, The West Point Story, 12 O'Clock High (season 3, episode 13, "Six Feet Under"), The Twilight Zone (episode: "Mirror Image"), Wagon Train, and Rawhide.

Milner was under contract at Hecht-Lancaster, Burt Lancaster's production company. He also acted in films, including The Long Gray Line (1955), Mister Roberts (1955), Gunfight at the O.K. Corral (1957), Sweet Smell of Success (1957), Marjorie Morningstar (1958), where he was able to draw on his Jewish roots playing the role of Wally Wronkin, Compulsion (1959), and 13 Ghosts (1960). He later costarred in Valley of the Dolls (1967), based on the best-selling novel by Jacqueline Susann.

=== Route 66 ===
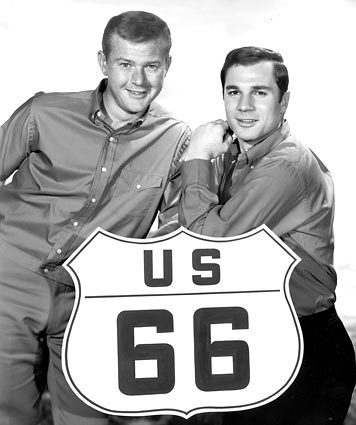
Milner (left) and George Maharis in Route 66 publicity still, 1962

In 1960, Milner was cast as Tod Stiles on the television series Route 66, which ran from 1960 to 1964. Created by Stirling Silliphant, Route 66 is about two regular but distinctly different young men in a car touring the United States. After the sudden death of his father left him penniless, save for a new Chevrolet Corvette, Milner's character travels across the United States in the Corvette, taking a variety of odd jobs along the way and getting involved in other people's problems. His traveling partner on his escapades is his friend Buz Murdock (played by George Maharis), a former employee of his father's. During the series' third season, Glenn Corbett replaced Maharis, who claimed he was ill with hepatitis, but later verified he wanted to break away to pursue other career opportunities. The show never regained its audience appeal with Corbett and was cancelled after a year.

Route 66 was shot on location, so Milner spent nearly four years traveling the US for the series, sometimes taking his wife and children along.

Milner appeared on Broadway once in the short-lived comedy The Ninety Day Mistress in 1967.

=== Adam-12 ===
By the mid-1960s, Milner and Jack Webb had a long-established working relationship. Milner had appeared in numerous episodes of both the radio and television versions of the series Dragnet, and had worked with Webb in the films Halls of Montezuma (1950) and Pete Kelly's Blues (1955).

In 1968, Milner returned to television as seven-year Los Angeles Police Department (LAPD) veteran uniform patrol Officer Pete Malloy in Adam-12, a Webb-produced police drama. Kent McCord played his partner, rookie Officer Jim Reed. The series ran from 1968 to 1975. Like Webb's Dragnet, it was based on real LAPD procedures and cases.

Milner was Webb's choice for Malloy in part because of his relative youth and prior acting credits and because of his on-camera driving experience from his days on Route 66. He guest-starred in three episodes of Emergency! between 1972 and 1976, during and after Adam-12's run on NBC, the first of which, and the best known, was the pilot movie The Wedsworth-Townsend Act.

=== Later career ===
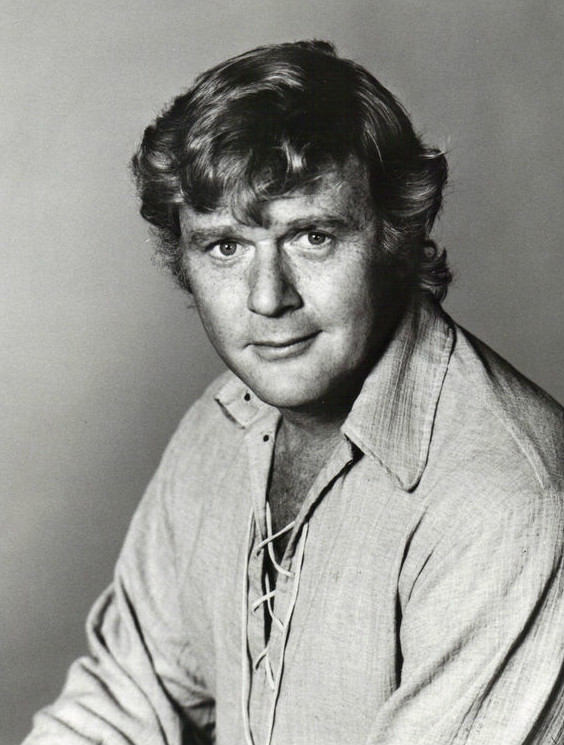
Milner in The Swiss Family Robinson in 1975

In 1971, Milner portrayed the murder victim in the premiere episode of Columbo titled "Murder by the Book". After Adam-12, Milner starred as Karl Robinson in a television series version of The Swiss Family Robinson (1975–1976), produced by Irwin Allen. Most of his later work was as a guest star, including MacGyver (as the protagonist's father), Airwolf, Murder, She Wrote, and RoboCop: The Series. In 1983, Milner hosted a morning radio wake-up show on AM 600 KOGO in San Diego.

In 1990, Milner teamed again with Kent McCord in the cable TV-movie Nashville Beat (1990) on The Nashville Network. The story was co-written by McCord, who played an LAPD detective who works with his former partner, played by Milner, in Nashville, Tennessee. In 1992, Milner guest-starred on five episodes of ABC's Life Goes On.

After retiring from acting, Milner co-hosted a radio show about fishing called Let's Talk Hook-Up on San Diego-area sports station XETRA AM 690 (now XEWW).

In 1998, Milner took part in a documentary film, Route 66: Return to the Road with Martin Milner, in which he drove a 1961 Corvette from Chicago to Santa Monica.

== Personal life ==
In May 1956, Milner met singer and actress Judith Bess Jones at a Hollywood dinner party. They were married on February 23, 1957, in Waukegan, Illinois. They had four children together.

In February 2003, Milner's eldest daughter Amy, who appeared in an episode of Adam 12, was diagnosed with acute myeloid leukemia. She died in December 2004.

=== Death ===
On September 6, 2015, Milner died of heart failure at his home in Carlsbad, California, at age 83. His remains were cremated.

== In popular culture ==
Milner was the visual inspiration for the DC Comics superhero Guy Gardner / Green Lantern.

== Filmography ==
=== Film ===
Year	Title	Role	Notes
1947	Life with Father	John Day	
1948	The Wreck of the Hesperus	Nathaniel	
1949	The Green Promise	Joe	Uncredited
1949	Sands of Iwo Jima	Pvt. Mike McHugh	
1950	Louisa	Bob Stewart	
1950	Our Very Own	Bert	
1951	Halls of Montezuma	Whitney	
1951	Operation Pacific	Ens. Caldwell	
1951	Fighting Coast Guard	Al Prescott	
1951	I Want You	George Kress Jr.	
1952	The Captive City	Phil Harding	
1952	Belles on Their Toes	Al Lynch	Uncredited
1952	My Wife's Best Friend	Buddy Chamberlain	
1952	Springfield Rifle	Pvt. Olie Larsen	
1952	Battle Zone	Corp. Andy Sayer	
1953	Last of the Comanches	Billy Creel	
1953	Destination Gobi	Elwood Halsey	
1954	Dial M for Murder	Policeman Outside Wendice Flat	Uncredited
1955	The Long Gray Line	Jim O'Carberry	Uncredited
1955	Mister Roberts	Shore Patrol Officer	
1955	Francis in the Navy	W.T. 'Rick' Rickson	
1955	Pete Kelly's Blues	Joey Firestone	
1956	On the Threshold of Space	Lt. Mort Glenn	
1956	Navy Wife		
1956	Screaming Eagles	Pvt. Corliss	
1956	Pillars of the Sky	Waco	
1957	Man Afraid	Shep Hamilton	
1957	Desk Set	Bit Part	Uncredited
1957	Gunfight at the O.K. Corral	James Earp	
1957	Sweet Smell of Success	Steve Dallas	Credited as 'Marty Milner'
1958	Too Much, Too Soon	Lincoln Forrester	
1958	Marjorie Morningstar	Wally Wronkin	
1959	Compulsion	Sid Brooks	
1960	The Private Lives of Adam and Eve	Ad Simms / Adam	
1960	13 Ghosts	Benjamen Rush	
1960	Sex Kittens Go to College	George Barton	Also associate producer
1965	Zebra in the Kitchen	Dr. Del Hartwood	
1966	Ski Fever	Brian Davis	
1967	Sullivan's Empire	John Sullivan	
1967	Valley of the Dolls	Mel Anderson	
1968	Three Guns for Texas	Const. Clendon MacMillan	
1989	Nashville Beat	Captain Brian O'Neal	
1998	Route 66: Return to the Road with Martin Milner	Himself	Documentary

=== Television ===
Year	Title	Role	Notes
1950	The Lone Ranger	Dick McHenry	Episode: "Pay Dirt"
1950–1951	The Stu Erwin Show	Drexel Potter	8 episodes
1951	The Bigelow Theatre	T.K.O.	Episode: "T.K.O."
1952–1955	Dragnet	Stephen Banner	6 episodes
1953–1957	The Life of Riley	Bruce; Don Marshall	4 episodes
1954–1955	Schlitz Playhouse of Stars	Various roles	2 episodes
1955	The Great Gildersleeve	Brick	Episode: "Water Commissioner's Water Color"
1956	NBC Matinee Theater	Various roles	2 episodes
1956	TV Reader's Digest	US Army Recruit	Episode: "The Old, Old Story"
1956	The Charles Farrell Show		Episode: "Love and Kisses"
1956	Telephone Time		Episode: "The Churchill Club"
1956	Science Fiction Theatre	Britt	Episode: "Three Minute Mile"
1956	Crossroads	Charles Mitchell	2 episodes
1956	Navy Log	Monk Jacob	"Incident at Formosa"
1956–1957	The West Point Story	Various roles	2 episodes
1958	Wagon Train	Matt Trumbell	Episode: "The Sally Potter Story"
1958–1959	Westinghouse Desilu Playhouse	Various roles	2 episodes
1958–1959	The Millionaire	Various roles	2 episodes
1959	Rawhide	Johnny Doan	Episode: "Incident with an Executioner"
1959	Playhouse 90		Episode: "Judgment at Nuremberg"
1959	Steve Canyon	Sgt. Ernest Bigelow	Season 1/Episode 34: "Operation Firebee"
1959	Hotel de Paree	Pat Williams	Episode: "Vein of Ore"
1959	U.S. Marshal	Deputy Bob Baxter	Episode: "Trigger Happy"
1960	The Twilight Zone	Paul Grinstead	Episode: "Mirror Image"
1960–1964	Route 66	Tod Stiles	116 episodes
1965	Memorandum for a Spy		Television film
1965	Starr, First Baseman	Joe Starr	Television film
1965	Slattery's People	State Representative Scott Fleming	Episode: "Question: What's a Requiem for a Loser?"
1965	Gidget	Kahuna	Episode: "The Great Kahuna"
1965	Laredo	Clendon MacMillan	Episode: "Yahoo"
1965–1966	Bob Hope Presents the Chrysler Theatre	Various roles	3 episodes
1965–1966	The Virginian	Various roles	2 episodes
1966	A Man Called Shenandoah	Neal Henderson	Episode: "Requiem for the Second"
1966	12 O'Clock High	Maj. Dimscek	Episode: "Six Feet Under"
1967	The Rat Patrol	Sgt. Roberts	Episode: "The Wild Goose Raid"
1967	Run for Your Life	Colonel Mike Green	2 episodes
1967	The Felony Squad	Thomas Glynn	Episode: "Hit and Run, Run, Run"
1967	Insight	Sherm	Episode: "Fat Hands and a Diamond Ring"
1968	Land's End	Eric	Television film
1968	Dragnet	Officer Pete Malloy	Episode: "Internal Affairs: DR-20"
1968–1975	Adam-12	Officer Pete Malloy	174 episodes
1970	The Tonight Show Starring Johnny Carson	self	Episode: September 28, 1970
1971	Columbo	Jim Ferris	Episode: "Murder by the Book"
1971	The D.A. (1971 TV series)	Officer Pete Malloy	Episode: "The People vs. Saydo"
1972	Hollywood Squares	Himself	Celebrity Guest Star
1972–1976	Emergency!	Officer Pete Malloy	3 episodes
1973	Runaway!	John Shedd	Television film
1974	Hurricane	Maj. Hymie Stoddard	Television film
1975–1976	The Swiss Family Robinson	Karl Robinson	20 episodes
1976	Flood!	Paul Burke	Television film
1977	SST: Death Flight	Lyle Kingman	Television film
1977	Police Story	Grady Dolin	Episode: "Stigma"
1978	Black Beauty	Tom Gray	Miniseries
1978	Little Mo	Wilbur Folsom	Television film
1979	Crisis in Mid-Air	Dr. Denvers	Television film
1979	The Last Convertible	Sergeant Dabric	Miniseries
1979	Password Plus	Himself	Game Show Contestant / Celebrity Guest Star
1979	The Seekers	Philip Kent	Television film
1980	The Littlest Hobo	Don Porter	Episode: "Sailing Away"
1981	Fantasy Island	Various roles	2 episodes
1981	The Ordeal of Bill Carney	Peter Belton	Television movie
1984	Masquerade	Charlie Miller	Episode: "Winnings"
1985	Airwolf	Arthur Barnes	Episode: "Severance Pay"
1985–1996	Murder, She Wrote	Various roles	5 episodes
1988	MacGyver	Coach Turk Donner	Episode: "Thin Ice"
1989	Nashville Beat	Captain Brian O'Neal	Television movie
1990	MacGyver	James MacGyver	Episode: "Passages"
1992	Life Goes On	Harris Cassidy	5 episodes
1994	RoboCop: The Series	Russell Murphy	2 Episodes: "The Human Factor" / "Corporate Raiders"
1997	Diagnosis: Murder	Detective Frank Halloran	Episode: "Murder Blues", (final appearance)
1997	Hollywood Squares	self	Episode: February 25, 2004
