= George Maharis =

American actor (1928–2023)

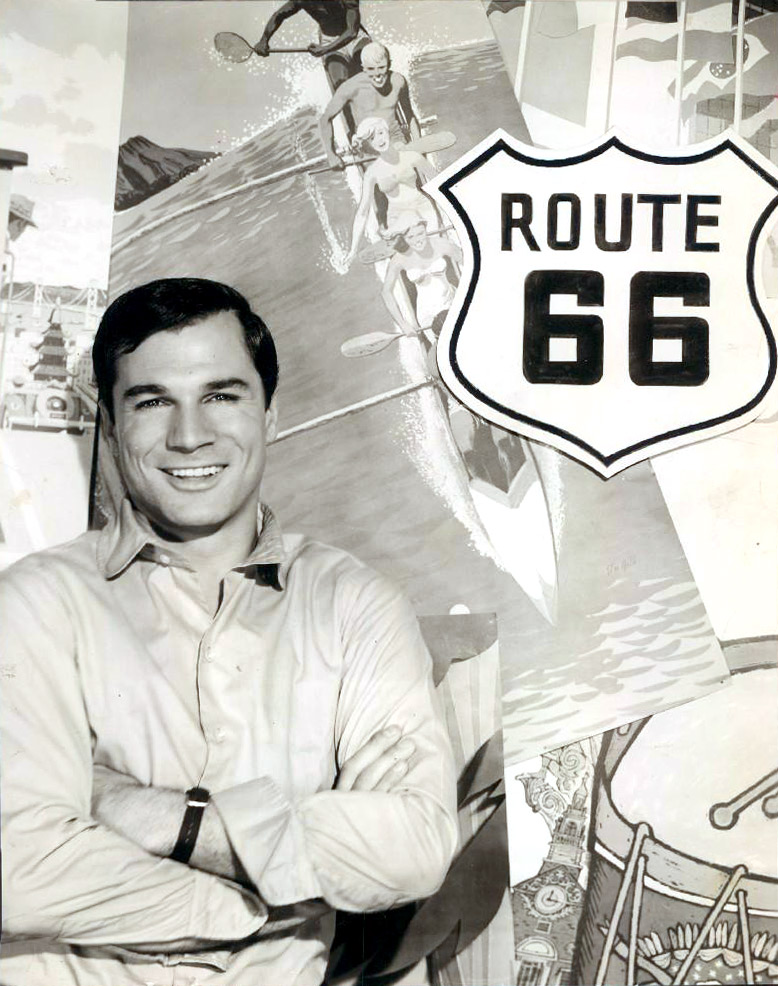
- Maharis in a 1962 publicity photo
- Born: September 1, 1928; Queens, New York, U.S.
- Died: May 24, 2023 (aged 94); Beverly Hills, California, U.S.
- Occupations: Actor; singer; artist
- Years active: 1953–1993

George Maharis (September 1, 1928 – May 24, 2023) was an American actor, singer, and visual artist who portrayed Buz Murdock in the first three seasons of the TV series Route 66. Maharis also recorded several pop music albums at the height of his fame, and later starred in the TV series The Most Deadly Game.

== Early life and education ==
Maharis was born in Astoria, Queens, the third of six children born to Vasilios (later William) Mahairas and Demetra Stranis, both immigrants from Greece. He was raised in the Hell's Kitchen neighborhood of mid-town Manhattan. His brother Robert was a production assistant on Route 66 and became a film location manager. Maharis attended Flushing High School, where his schoolmates recognized his talent as a singer. He left before graduating and served for 18 months in the United States Marine Corps and then earned his high school diploma. He worked odd jobs while trying to launch a singing career, and appeared in musicals outside of New York City. He got his first break as an actor on the television comedy series Mister Peepers, playing a parody of Marlon Brando. He subsequently studied at the Actors Studio with Sanford Meisner and Lee Strasberg.

== Early career ==
After a short stint at the Cincinnati Playhouse in the Park, Maharis returned to New York and won recognition in off-Broadway productions. In 1955, Maharis received critical acclaim for his roles in John Van Druten's play Dancing in the Chequered Shade, and Tennessee Williams' play, 27 Wagons Full of Cotton. In October 1958, a critic at The New York Times described his performance in Jean Genet's Deathwatch as "correctly volatile, harsh, soft and cunning". In 1960 he performed in the first U.S. production of a work by Edward Albee, The Zoo Story. Brooks Atkinson wrote that Maharis' performance as the "overwrought yet searching intruder" was "a first-rate piece of acting". Maharis won the Performance award at the Theatre World Awards for his role in The Zoo Story.

He later explained that his off-Broadway experience proved a handicap when seeking Broadway theatre roles: "Off Broadway had a stigma. It was like admitting you played the Borscht Circuit." Instead he found work in television. He appeared on Studio One, Kraft Television Theatre, Goodyear Television Playhouse and Stirling Silliphant's Naked City. In Search for Tomorrow, he played a gambler who mistreated his wife. He launched his film career with roles in William Berke's The Mugger (1958) and Otto Preminger's Exodus (1960).

One assessment of his early career put him in the "tough personality" tradition of Humphrey Bogart and John Garfield. Paul Gardner said:

He was the cad who left unwed mothers in rooming houses and socked his lady friends when they irritated him ... To mothers, he was an undisciplined kid they wanted to spank — and then give a piece of chocolate. To aging debutantes, he was the ideal Fourth of July date, especially when it came time for shooting firecrackers.

== Route 66 ==
George Maharis with guest star Julie Newmar in Route 66 (1962)

Beginning in 1960, Maharis co-starred with Martin Milner in the CBS television series Route 66. His work earned him an Emmy nomination for Outstanding Lead Actor in a Series in 1962.

After appearing in 82 episodes, Maharis left the series during the third season, citing health problems, including hepatitis. He attributed his swift recovery to the fact that he did not drink. He returned to work in the spring of 1962 and filmed several shows, but complained he was being made to work excessive hours and left again. He told an interviewer: "If I keep going at the present pace, I'm a fool. Even if you have $4,000,000 in the bank, you can't buy another liver."

A legal battle and harsh words followed. At first Maharis sought no other employment, but once the producers replaced him for the next season he began to book other engagements. He was scheduled to sing on The Ed Sullivan Show on June 16, 1963, until the Route 66 producers, claiming he was still under exclusive contract to them, prevented his appearance by legal action. They claimed he was feigning illness to get out of his contract. One claimed Maharis cared only about a film career and had "no regard for this company, his co-star, Marty Milner, and the 50 or 60 other people on the show". Maharis countered that they needed to learn that "There isn't any more Old Hollywood where a company can buy movie stars like pieces of meat." Maharis soon won the legal argument that his contract was void and although the Route 66 producers attempted a reconciliation, he made his first post-Route 66 television appearance on July 2, 1963. After Maharis' departure, the show's appeal declined. Glenn Corbett acted in the role of Milner's new sidekick, Linc Case. Route 66 was canceled in March 1964.

In November 1963, Maharis described his work on Route 66:

Some actors wouldn't touch a series, but they're just like summer stock. A show a week jazz. The series taught how to maintain my integrity and not get sucked in by compromise. Guys wrote the show who had never seen it ... I worked with two-and-a-half years of directors but only five had talent. Usually they'd stick a camera in front of you and expect you to recite. You have to fight for your standards. Then what happens? They call you difficult. But that shouldn't make any difference. In the last analysis, it's your own standards, your own belief that you are doing something good, that sells a show.

== Later career ==
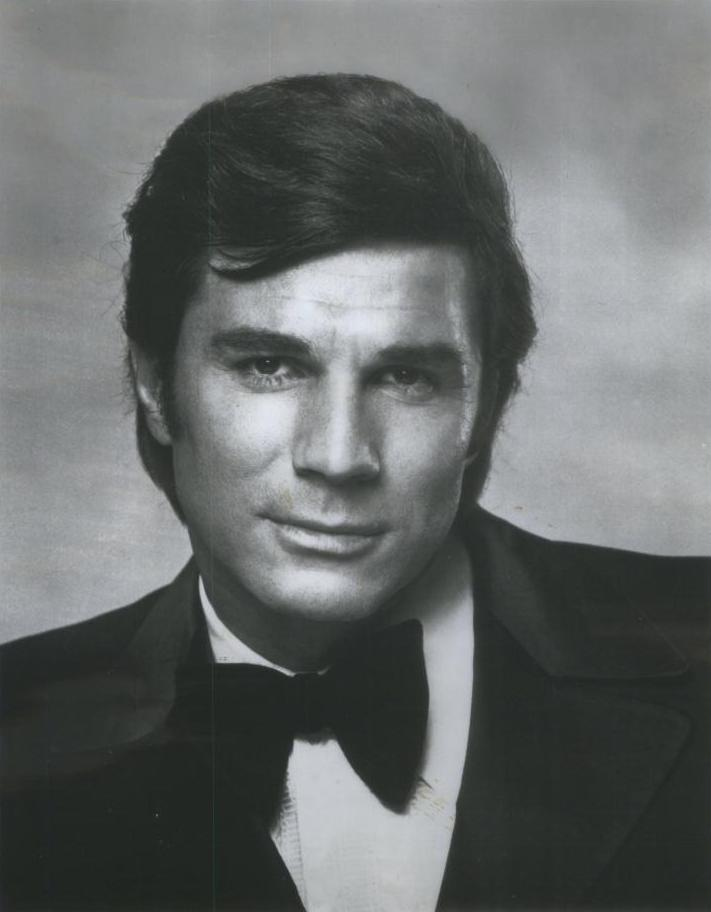
Maharis, circa 1972

A string of films followed, including Quick, Before It Melts (1964), The Satan Bug and Sylvia (both 1965), A Covenant with Death and The Happening (both 1967), and The Desperados (1969).

Returning to series television in 1970, Maharis starred as criminologist Jonathan Croft in The Most Deadly Game. The series lasted 13 episodes, ending in January 1971.

Maharis modeled fully nude for the centerfold of the July 1973 issue of Playgirl magazine, one of the first celebrities to do so. It was the magazine's second issue.

Throughout the 1970s and 1980s, Maharis had featured roles in several television movies and also guest-starred on numerous television series, including Mission: Impossible, Fantasy Island, Kojak, McMillan & Wife, Barnaby Jones, Police Story, Cannon, Night Gallery, and The Bionic Woman. He also appeared in Murder, She Wrote.

Maharis appeared as Count Machelli in the cult classic film The Sword and the Sorcerer (1982). His occasional stage work included starring with the Kenley Players in productions of Barefoot in the Park (1967) and How the Other Half Loves (1973) and in touring company productions of Company (1972) and Guys and Dolls (1976). In the 1980s he performed in Las Vegas. Doppelganger (1993), also known as The Evil Within, was his last appearance in motion pictures.

== Visual art and music ==
Maharis released albums and singles through Epic Records relatively early in his career. His debut album, "George Maharis Sings!", was on the Billboard's Album Chart for 29 weeks in 1962, peaking at number 10. It ended up as the number 41 album of 1962. Maharis had moderate success with his single, "Teach Me Tonight", which was on the Billboard magazine's charts for 11 weeks in 1962, reaching number 25 on the Hot 100, and number 8 on the Easy Listening chart. His single "Love Me as I Love You" charted at number 17 on the Easy Listening chart in September 1962. He made his singing debut on television in 1963, appearing on The Judy Garland Show, singing "Side by Side" with her.

Later, he performed in nightclubs and pursued a secondary career as an impressionist painter. As of 2008, Maharis was still painting, splitting his time between New York City and Beverly Hills, California.

== Legal issues ==
Maharis was arrested in 1967 on charges of lewd conduct, and in 1974 on charges of sexual perversion for using men's bathrooms as venues to cruise for sex. However, both charges were later dismissed, and he pleaded guilty to misdemeanor offenses of disturbing the peace in 1967, and trespassing in 1975.

== Death ==
Maharis died at his Beverly Hills home on May 24, 2023, at the age of 94 after contracting hepatitis. Survivors included his brother Robert and a sister.

== Filmography ==
=== Television ===
Year	Title	Role	Notes	Refs
1953	The Philco Television Playhouse	Dancer at the Dance Club	Episode: 'Marty'	
1955	Mister Peepers	Marlon Brando	Episode: 'The Wally Cox Story'	
1957	Goodyear Television Playhouse		American anthology series	
1959	Brenner	Alex	Episode: 'Word of Honor'	
1959	Naked City	Johnny Gary	Episode: 'Four Sweet Corners'	
1960	Alcoa Theatre	Johnny Cesare	Episode: 'Action Off Screen'	
1960–61	Search for Tomorrow	Bud Gardner	American television soap opera	
1960–63	Route 66	Buz Murdock	American adventure crime drama	
1962	PM West	Guest	Interviewed by Mike Wallace	
1963	The Hy Gardner Show	Guest	Interviewed by Hy Gardner	
1963	The Judy Garland Show	Himself	Guest star	
1965	Hullabaloo	Himself	Host and performer	
1966	Bob Hope Presents the Chrysler Theatre	Ex-athlete	Episode 14: The Eighth Day	
1967	The Danny Thomas Hour	Phil Pearson	Episode: 'The Demon Under the Bed'	
1968	Journey to the Unknown	Drake	Episode: 'Miss Belle'	
1970	The Dick Cavett Show	Guest	Interviewed by Dick Cavett	
1970	The Most Deadly Game	Jonathan Croft	Episode: 'War Games'	
1971	Cade's County	Deck Minty	Episode: 'The Mustangers'	
1971	Medical Center	Evan Kenbrook	Episode: 'The Pawn'	
1971	Night Gallery	Peter Lacland	Segment: 'The Hand of Borgus Weems'	
1972	Cannon	Paul Stubber	Episode: 'The Rip Off'	
1972	The Victim	Ben Chappel	TV film	
1972–73	The Tonight Show Starring Johnny Carson	Guest	Interviewed by Johnny Carson	
1973	Barnaby Jones	Warren Davis	Episode: 'The Deadly Prize'	
1973	Mission: Impossible	Thomas Bachman	Episode: 'The Fountain'	
1973–77	Police Story	Sgt. Hank Delany; J.R. Peters; Salter	3 episodes, 1973, 1975, 1977	
1974	Marcus Welby, M.D.	Curtis Haynes	Episode: 'Out of Control'	
1974	McMillan & Wife	Walter Webley	Episode: 'The Game of Survival'	
1974	Movin' On	Harry Armour	Episode 7: The Good Life	
1974	Nakia	Joe Arnold	Episode: 'Pete'	
1974	Shaft	Wally Doyle	Episode: 'Cop Killer'	
1974	The Snoop Sisters	Robert Duware	Episode: 'The Devil Made Me Do It!'	
1974	Thriller	Mark Fields	Episode: 'Death To Sister Mary'	
1974	The Wide World of Mystery	Walter	Episode: 'Come Die with Me'	
1976	Bert D'Angelo/Superstar	Lee Mitchell	Episode: 'Scag'	
1976	The Bionic Woman	Sgt. Bob Welton	Episode: 'Jamie's Shield'	
1976	Ellery Queen	Dr. Tony Bender	Episode: 'The Adventure Of The Judas Tree'	
1976	Gibbsville		Episode: 'The Price of Everything'	
1976	Good Heavens	Gary Lawrence	Episode: 'See Jane Run'	
1976	Jigsaw John	Robert Derek	Episode: 'Plastique'	
1976	Rich Man, Poor Man	Joey Quales	TV miniseries	
1977	The Feather & Father Gang	Sherwin	Episode: 'Flight to Mexico'	
1977	Kojak	Ringer	Episode: 'Lady In The Squadroom'	
1977	Switch	Clouston	Episode: 'Legend of the Macunas'	
1978	Logan's Run	Gavin	Episode: 'Night Visitors'	
1979–82	Fantasy Island	Joe Capos; Prof. Alan Blair; Mario Ferini; Dr. Hal Workman; Jack Becker	6 episodes	
1984	Matt Houston	Dr. Charles Brockway	Episode: 'The Bikini Murders'	
1984	The Master	Simon Garrett	Episode: 'The Good, the Bad, and the Priceless'	
1989	Superboy	Jack McAlister	Episode: 'Programmed For Death'	
1989	Murder, She Wrote	Alec Burton	Episode: 'The Fixer Upper'	
1990	Murder, She Wrote	Charlie Cosmo	Episode: 'Trials and Tribulations' (last television role)	

=== Theatrical films ===
Year	Title	Role	Notes	Refs
1958	The Mugger	Nicholas Grecco	American noir-crime film	
1960	Exodus	Yoav	American film about the founding of the State of Israel	
1964	Quick, Before It Melts	Peter Santelli	American comedy film	
1965	Sylvia	Alan Macklin	American drama film	
1965	The Satan Bug	Lee Barrett	American crime suspense film	
1966	A Small Rebellion	Michael Kolinos	TV film	
1967	A Covenant with Death	Ben Lewis	American legal drama film	
1967	The Happening	Taurus	American crime comedy film	
1968	Escape to Mindanao	Joe Walden	TV film	
1969	The Desperados	Jacob Galt	American Western film	
1969	The Monk	Gus Monk	TV film	
1970	Land Raiders	Paul Cardenas	American Western film	
1970	The Last Day of the War	Sgt. Chip Slater	Premiered in Spain as El Último Día de la Guerra in August 1970; aired on US television in September 1970	
1972	The Victim	Ben Chapel	TV film	
1974	Death in Space	Dr. Dan Summit	TV film	
1975	Murder on Flight 502	Robert Davenport	TV film	
1976	Look What's Happened to Rosemary's Baby	Guy Woodhouse	TV film	
1977	SST: Death Flight	Les Phillips	TV film	
1978	Return to Fantasy Island	Benson	TV film	
1978	The Crash of Flight 401	Evan Walsh	TV film	
1982	The Sword and the Sorcerer	Machelli, Cromwell War Chancellor	American sword and sorcery fantasy film	
1993	Doppelganger	Mike Wallace	American supernatural horror film (also known as The Evil Within)	

== Selected discography ==
=== Albums ===
Original releases

- 1962 – George Maharis Sings! – Epic LN 24001/BN 26001
- 1962 – Portrait in Music – Epic LN 24021/BN 26021
- 1963 – Just Turn Me Loose! – Epic LN 24037/BN 26037
- 1963 – Where Can You Go For a Broken Heart? – Epic LN 24064/BN 26064
- 1964 – Make Love to Me – Epic LN 24079/BN 26079
- 1964 – Tonight You Belong to Me – Epic LN 24111/BN 26111
- 1966 – New Route: George Maharis – Epic LN 24191/BN 26191

=== Singles ===
Original releases

- 1962 – "After the Lights Go Down Low" / "Teach Me Tonight" – Epic 5-9504
- 1962 – "They Knew About You" / "Love Me as I Love You" – Epic 5-9522
- 1962 – "I'll Never Smile Again" / "Can't Help Falling In Love" – Epic 5-9545
- 1962 – "(Get Your Kicks on) Route 66" / "You Must Have Been A Beautiful Baby" – Epic 3-9548
- 1962 – "Baby Has Gone Bye Bye" / "After One Kiss" – Epic 5-9555
- 1963 – "Don't Fence Me In" / "Alright, Okay, You Win" – Epic 5-9569
- 1963 – "Where Can You Go (For a Broken Heart)" / "Kiss Me" – Epic 5-9600
- 1963 – "That's How It Goes" / "It Isn't There" – Epic 5-9613
- 1963 – "It's a Sin to Tell a Lie" / "Sara Darling" – Epic 5-9653
- 1964 – "Tonight You Belong to Me" / "The Object of My Affection" – Epic 5-9696
- 1964 – "I'm Coming Back for You" / "Lonely People Do Foolish Things" – Epic 5-9753
- 1965 – "Where Does Happiness Go" / "More I Cannot Do" – Epic 5-9772
- 1965 – "You Always Hurt the One You Love" / "Quien Sabe? (Who Knows? Who Knows?)" – Epic 5-9844
- 1965 – "A World Without Sunshine" / "Ivy" – Epic 5-9858
- 1966 – "Goodbye, Good Luck And God Bless You/Never Is A Long Long Time" – Epic 5-10039

Reissues

- 1964 – "Teach Me Tonight"/"Baby Has Gone Bye Bye" – Memory Lane (Epic) 5-2223
- 1965 – "(Get Your Kicks On) Route 66!/Can't Help Falling In Love" – Memory Lane (Epic) 5-2227
