= Pete Kelly's Blues (film) =

1955 film directed by Jack Webb

- Front cover of VHS release of Pete Kelly's Blues
- Directed by: Jack Webb
- Screenplay by: Richard L. Breen
- Produced by: Jack Webb
- Starring: Jack Webb; Janet Leigh; Edmond O'Brien
- Cinematography: Harold Rosson
- Edited by: Robert M. Leeds
- Music by: Arthur Hamilton; Ray Heindorf; David Buttolph; Matty Matlock
- Production company: Mark VII Limited
- Distributed by: Warner Bros. Pictures
- Release date: July 31, 1955
- Running time: 95 minutes
- Country: United States
- Language: English
- Budget: $1.2 million
- Box office: $5 million (US/Canada rentals)

Pete Kelly's Blues is a 1955 musical crime film based on the 1951 radio series of the same name. It was directed by and starred Jack Webb in the title role of a bandleader and musician. Janet Leigh is featured as party girl Ivy Conrad, and Edmond O'Brien as a gangster who applies pressure to Kelly. Peggy Lee portrays alcoholic jazz singer Rose Hopkins (a performance for which she received an Academy Award nomination for Best Actress in a Supporting Role). Ella Fitzgerald makes a cameo as singer Maggie Jackson. Lee Marvin, Martin Milner, and Jayne Mansfield also make early career appearances.

Much of the dialogue was written by writers who also wrote the radio series Pat Novak for Hire (1946–1949) and the radio version of Pete Kelly's Blues (1951), in both of which Webb starred for a time before creating Dragnet.

== Plot ==
Jazz cornetist Pete Kelly (Jack Webb) and his Big Seven are the house band at the 17 Club, a speakeasy in Kansas City in 1927 during Prohibition. Crime boss Fran McCarg (Edmond O'Brien) is moving in on the local music scene and wants a percentage of the band's meager earnings. When the band resists, Kelly decides to decline the strongarm and see what happens.

After the night's last set, Rudy, the club manager, orders Kelly and the band to the mansion of Ivy Conrad (Janet Leigh), a wealthy flapper with a reputation for hosting rowdy parties. Reluctantly, Kelly arrives at the party and leaves a message for McCarg to call him there. When the call comes through, Kelly is busy fending off Ivy's advances; instead, it is intercepted by Kelly's drunk, hot-tempered drummer, Joey Firestone (Martin Milner), who abusively turns McCarg down. Kelly and his band are run off the road by unknown assailants as they drive back to town, and Firestone is thrown out of the car over its hood.

The following night, Firestone roughs up Guy Bettenhauser, McCarg's top hired gun. Kelly desperately tries to patch things up, but to no avail. As the band finishes its last number, two gunmen burst through the front door of the club. Kelly tries to save Firestone by sending him out the back, but Firestone is shot to death in the alleyway. Tired and frustrated by his drummer's murder and the subsequent departure of his long-time friend and clarinetist, Al (Lee Marvin), Kelly returns to his apartment to find Ivy asleep in his bed. Although he initially tries to throw her out, then resists her advances, the two strike up a relationship that turns with the passing months into an engagement.

Later, all the local band leaders meet secretly to decide how to respond to McCarg's pressure. When Kelly reaffirms that he will put up no resistance, the rest cave in. Detective George Tennel (Andy Devine), who is trying to take McCarg down, tries to enlist Kelly's help, but is refused.

McCarg again tries to befriend Kelly, telling him that Bettenhauser acted alone in Firestone's murder. He also presses his moll, Rose Hopkins (Peggy Lee), a one-time talented songbird gone to the bottle, on the band. Her singing rapidly improves, but not her drinking. One night, soused, she cannot bring herself to overcome an unruly crowd and quits mid-song. An enraged McCarg chases her to her dressing room and beats her senseless, causing her to tumble down a flight of stairs in a heap. Kelly then turns to Tennel, who informs him that Bettenhauser has skipped town.

Al drops in to see Kelly. The two come to blows over Kelly's capitulations, but patch things up, and Al rejoins the band. In a burst of spine, Kelly tries to buy his way out, but McCarg intimidates him into continuing. Meanwhile, Ivy, feeling left out by Kelly's dedication to his music, decides to go her own way.

Kelly gets a message to meet someone who turns out to be Bettenhauser. He tells Kelly McCarg was who ordered Firestone's death, but if Kelly can come up with $1,200 by daybreak, he will help him take down McCarg. Kelly agrees. Bettenhauser then tells Kelly he can find incriminating bank checks and papers in McCarg's office at the Everglade Ballroom.

Back at the club, Kelly arms himself, but is waylaid by a clueless Ivy, who wants a last dance with him. He insists he does not have the time. Kelly rifles a desk in McCarg's office, but before he can get what he needs, the ballroom's riotous orchestrion begins to blare; Ivy is there, insisting on her dance. Kelly fretfully agrees, but soon finds himself surrounded by McCarg and two of his torpedoes. One of them is Bettenhauser, who had set him up.

A wild shootout ensues. Kelly barricades himself behind wooden tables. Bettenhauser climbs into the rafters to get a better angle, but gets plugged. McCarg's other man tries to shoot Kelly, but Kelly throws a chair at him, causing him to hit and mortally wound McCarg, instead. Seeing this, the gunman gives up, saying he has nothing left to gain by risking his life.

Back at the 17 Club, business is as usual – the band lively playing, Ivy and Pete back together, and Rudy finding ways to cut more corners.

== Cast ==
- Jack Webb as Pete Kelly
- Janet Leigh as Ivy Conrad
- Edmond O'Brien as Fran McCarg
- Peggy Lee as Rose Hopkins
- Andy Devine as George Tenell
- Lee Marvin as Al Gannaway
- Ella Fitzgerald as Maggie Jackson
- Martin Milner as Joey Firestone
- Than Wyenn as Rudy Shulak
- Herb Ellis as Bedido
- John Dennis as Guy Bettenhauser
- Jayne Mansfield as Cigarette Girl
- Mort Marshall as Cootie Jacobs
- Moe Schneider as Band member (Big 7)
- George Van Eps as Guitarist (Big 7)
- Ray Sherman as Band member (Big 7)
- Matty Matlock as Band member (Big 7)
- Eddie Miller as Band member (Big 7)
- Nick Fatool as Drummer (Big 7)
- Jud De Naut as Bassist (Big 7)

== See also ==
- List of American films of 1955
- Pete Kelly's Blues (radio series)
- Pete Kelly's Blues (song)
- Pete Kelly's Blues (TV series)
- Songs from Pete Kelly's Blues
