= List of Medical Center episodes =

This is a list of episodes for the television series Medical Center. This series consists of a two-hour pilot and seven seasons of episodes.

== Series overview ==
Season	Episodes	Originally released	
Season	Episodes	First released	Last released
Pilot		April 17, 1969	
1	26	September 24, 1969	April 15, 1970
2	24	September 16, 1970	March 10, 1971
3	24	September 15, 1971	March 8, 1972
4	24	September 13, 1972	February 28, 1973
5	24	September 10, 1973	April 15, 1974
6	24	September 9, 1974	March 24, 1975
7	24	September 8, 1975	March 15, 1976

== Episodes ==
=== Pilot (1969) ===
Title	Directed by	Written by	Original release date
"U.M.C." "Operation Heartbeat"	Boris Sagal	Al C. Ward	April 17, 1969
Dr. Forestman (Edward G. Robinson) needs a heart transplant. Starring (Richard Bradford) as Dr. Joe Gannon.

=== Season 1 (1969–70) ===
No. overall	No. in season	Title	Directed by	Written by	Original release date
1	1	"The Last Ten Yards"	William A. Graham	Andy Lewis	September 24, 1969
Bru Wiley (O. J. Simpson), a college football star up for Heisman Trophy honors and a top pro career, ignores his failing health. Cicely Tyson, Ed Asner, and Dana Elcar guest star.
2	2	"Victim"	Charles S. Dubin	Robert Hamner	October 1, 1969
Although the father of a 7-year-old with severe internal injuries insists the child fell off an embankment, Dr. Gannon suspects the child was beaten. Dyan Cannon and Robert Lansing guest star.
3	3	"Emergency in Ward E"	Leo Penn	Shimon Wincelberg	October 8, 1969
A college student stumbles into the hospital with a bullet in his neck and emotional problems. Gerald S. O'Loughlin and Robert Pine guest star.
4	4	"A Life Is Waiting"	George McCowan	Anthony Terpiloff	October 15, 1969
The question of a therapeutic abortion divides Nora Caldwell (Barbara Rush) and her husband Dan (John McMartin).
5	5	"The Battle of Lily Wu"	Vincent Sherman	Don Brinkley	October 22, 1969
A Vietnamese war victim (France Nuyen) is being treated at the medical center.
6	6	"The Crooked Circle"	Vincent Sherman	Story by : Norman Katkov; Teleplay by : Norman Katkov & Shimon Wincelberg	October 29, 1969
College student Charlie Filbey (Tim Considine) is brought to Medical Center to undergo surgery for an abdominal condition. But Charlie's problems are more than medical; he's on methamphetamine – speed – a psychological crutch that will complicate postoperative care. Nan Martin guest stars.
7	7	"Thousands and Thousands of Miles"	Michael O'Herlihy	Don Brinkley	November 12, 1969
Jenny Webb (Brooke Bundy), with a hemorrhaging kidney and a baby on the way, is rejected by her angry father and uncaring boyfriend. Michael Brandon and Peter Donat guest star.
8	8	"The Sharpest Edge"	Harvey Hart	Oliver Crawford	November 19, 1969
An intradepartmental dispute pits Gannon against the new acting chief of surgery (John Marley).
9	9	"Jeopardy"	Alvin Ganzer	Story by : Donn Mullally; Teleplay by : Shimon Wincelberg & Donn Mullally	November 26, 1969
Dr. Gannon tries to prove that the suddenly violent behavior of student Greg Sorenson (Michael Burns) stems from an organic ailment. Lloyd Bochner and Joanna Cameron guest stars.
10	10	"The Fallen Image"	Daniel Petrie	Story by : Andy Lewis; Teleplay by : Al C. Ward & Andy Lewis	December 3, 1969
A U.S. ambassador (Walter Pidgeon) has a heart condition that could jeopardize a crucial meeting. Viveca Lindfors guest stars.
11	11	"The Loner"	Earl Bellamy	Robert J. Shaw	December 10, 1969
A patient (Lee Grant) learns a lesson about life from a little boy.
12	12	"24 Hours"	Daniel Petrie	Andy Lewis & Al C. Ward	December 17, 1969
Gannon stakes his reputation on the integrity of a student nurse (Belinda Montgomery).
13	13	"The Adversaries"	Gerald Mayer	Oscar Millard	December 31, 1969
Interns Steve Seagren (Christopher Stone) and Katherine Kenter (Patricia Quinn) are both being considered for a much-prized residency. Ricky Kelman guest stars in this episode as Quincy Rust.
14	14	"The Deceived"	Vincent Sherman	Andy Lewis	January 7, 1970
A student (Carrie Snodgrass) facing kidney failure gets no comfort from her alienated family or her uninterested ex-husband (Greg Mullavey).
15	15	"Moment of Decision"	Daniel Petrie	Story by : Robert J. Shaw & John W. Bloch; Teleplay by : Robert J. Shaw	January 14, 1970
Dr. Lochner's emotions conflict with his professional judgment when he faces a crisis concerning his own daughter (Tyne Daly real-life daughter of James Daly).
16	16	"Runaway"	Charles S. Dubin	Don Brinkley	January 21, 1970
Dr. Gannon tries to bridge a gap between a 17-year-old (Richard Thomas) and his gruff immigrant father (Simon Oakland).
17	17	"Fright and Flight"	Harvey Hart	Robert M. Young	February 4, 1970
A blind student's recovery depends on recalling the horrible event that caused her loss of sight. Martine Bartlett and Steve Ihnat guest star.
18	18	"A Duel with Doom"	Charles S. Dubin	Story by : Sy Salkowitz; Teleplay by : Shimon Wincelberg & Sy Salkowitz	February 11, 1970
The director of a foundation for teenage parolees lays his life on the line to save one of his charges. Bruce Davison and Martin Sheen guest star.
19	19	"A Matter of Tomorrow"	Earl Bellamy	John W. Bloch & Robert J. Shaw	February 25, 1970
The story of a dedicated head nurse (Mercedes McCambridge). Cliff Potts guest stars.
20	20	"Care Is No Cure"	Charles S. Dubin	Don Brinkley	March 4, 1970
A sensitive story about Gannon's love for an incurably ill woman (Shelby Grant). Stephen Brooks guest stars.
21	21	"The Professional"	Bernard McEveety	Don Brinkley	March 11, 1970
A former gridiron idol (Forrest Tucker) finds living with his own legend unbearable. Slim Pickens guest stars.
22	22	"The Combatants"	Earl Bellamy	Oliver Crawford	March 18, 1970
A research specialist (William Shatner) clashes with Gannon over a possible cancer cure.
23	23	"The V.D. Story"	Harvey Hart	Dick Nelson	March 25, 1970
A story about the need to treat venereal disease as a medical problem divorced from social stigma. Katherine Cannon, Anne Seymour, and Carl Betz guest star.
24	24	"His Brother's Keeper"	Earl Bellamy	Robert J. Shaw	April 1, 1970
Dr. Martin Lambert (Tim O'Connor) is blind to the fact that his older son suffers from a muscular disorder and that he has neglected his younger son. David Cassidy and Ben Murphy guest star.
25	25	"The Rebel in White"	Harvey Hart	Anthony Lawrence	April 8, 1970
An ambitious black resident (Georg Stanford Brown) is convinced that Gannon is preventing him from performing surgery. Will Geer, Paula Kelly and David Opatoshu guest star.
26	26	"Between Dark and Daylight"	Earl Bellamy	Don Brinkley	April 15, 1970
The story of a marriage tormented by lack of children. Sharon Farrell, Walter Koenig, Tom Skerritt and Lane Bradbury guest star.

=== Season 2 (1970–71) ===
No. overall	No. in season	Title	Directed by	Written by	Original release date
27	1	"Brink of Doom"	Daniel Petrie	Dick Nelson	September 16, 1970
Dr. Tom Forley (George Grizzard) has symptoms that may mean multiple sclerosis and the end of his chances to prove a life-saving surgical technique. Elizabeth Ashley guest stars.
28	2	"Undercurrent"	Daniel Petrie	Robert M. Young	September 23, 1970
A top medical researcher comes under scrutiny when it is revealed that he is a homosexual. Andrew Duggan and Salome Jens guest star.
29	3	"Junkie"	Murray Golden	Anthony Lawrence	September 30, 1970
A story about the feelings of parents whose teenagers are drug addicts. Murray Hamilton and Phyllis Thaxter guest star.
30	4	"Assailant"	Richard Benedict	Oliver Crawford; Barney Slater	October 7, 1970
A brooding young doctor (Gary Lockwood) is suspected of murdering a woman on hospital grounds. Bradford Dillman guest stars.
31	5	"The Clash"	Vincent Sherman	Cliff Gould	October 14, 1970
Gloria Howell (Vera Miles) is a doctor battling male prejudice. Her tactics – unbending adherence to the rules, even if it means endangering a patient's life and her own marriage – bring about a big clash. Charles Aidman guest stars.
32	6	"Ghetto Clinic"	Daniel Petrie	Oliver Crawford	October 21, 1970
Gannon spends a crisis-packed night at a free clinic established for people who cannot or will not enter establishment hospitals. His purpose: to put reins on the director, a free-wheeling doctor who defies all conventions to help his patients. William Devane and Vincent Van Patten guest star.
33	7	"Scream of Silence"	Vincent Sherman	Robert M. Young	October 28, 1970
This episode treats the problem of the slightly retarded child. The child is Gannon's goddaughter Jenny; the difficulty is convincing Jenny's mother (Lois Nettleton) of her condition and of her need for special schooling. Jason Evers also guest stars.
34	8	"Death Grip"	Harvey Hart	Jackson Gillis	November 4, 1970
The problems of a doctor who has trouble adjusting to civilian life after serving in Vietnam. Steve Forrest, Laurie Prange and Hugh Beaumont guest star.
35	9	"Witch Hunt"	Harvey Hart	Ed Adamson	November 11, 1970
Modern medicine clashes with black magic as Gannon tries to save a girl afflicted with Addison's disease – and a belief in the all-pervading, healing powers of Satan. Dick Kallman and Dana Wynter guest star.
36	10	"Deadly Encounter"	Vincent Sherman	Oliver Crawford; Max Hodge; Al C. Ward	November 18, 1970
Sandra Polk exacts a promise from Gannon that puts the doctor's career on the line: to perform radical surgery if necessary but without telling her husband. Diane Baker, Bettye Ackerman and James Shigeta guest star.
37	11	"Trial by Terror"	Harvey Hart	Mann Rubin	November 25, 1970
Blinded in an attack, Gannon is still being stalked by a would-be killer. George Chakiris and Frank Converse guest star.
38	12	"Accused"	Harvey Hart	Anthony Lawrence	December 2, 1970
A hallucinating patient accuses Gannon of fathering her unborn child. Belinda Montgomery, Ivan Bonar, Stanley Kamel and James Olson guest star.
39	13	"Crisis"	Murray Golden	Jack Turley	December 9, 1970
Gannon is accused of shielding a seriously injured cop who allegedly shot a student without provocation. Tiffany Bolling, Roddy McDowell, Keenan Wynn and Mark Jenkins guest star.
40	14	"Man at Bay"	Earl Bellamy	Don Brinkley	December 16, 1970
A brash, long-haired surgeon (Gary Lockwood) runs afoul of his colleagues.
41	15	"The Savage Image"	Earl Bellamy	Robert I. Holt	December 30, 1970
Gannon battles ancient superstition and modern bigotry when he tries to save a seriously ill Indian chief and enroll the chief's grandson in a physician's assistant training program. Geoffrey Deuel, Eduard Franz and Daniel J. Travanti guest star.
42	16	"Woman in Question"	Vincent Sherman	Don Brinkley	January 6, 1971
An intern who thinks his fiancee is "wholesome" doesn't know she contracted syphilis before they met. Brenda Scott, Dennis Cole and William Dozier guest star.
43	17	"Web of Darkness"	Harvey Hart	Frank Glicksman	January 13, 1971
A deadly story of sibling conflict. Jessica Walter and Janet Margolin guest star.
44	18	"Danger Point"	Michael Caffey	Jackson Gillis; John Meredyth Lucas	January 27, 1971
A missing radium implant could contaminate the entire hospital. Frank Aletter and Joanne Linville guest star.
45	19	"Secret Heritage"	Vincent Sherman	Cliff Gould	February 3, 1971
A mentally disabled teenager (Pamela Franklin) has been abandoned by her mother. Kim Stanley and Inga Swenson guest star.
46	20	"Edge of Violence"	Michael O'Herlihy	Stephen Kandel	February 10, 1971
The story of a troubled former Vaudeville star (Jack Carter). Liam Sullivan and Joan Van Ark guest star.
47	21	"Countdown"	Vincent Sherman	Don Brinkley	February 17, 1971
The high cost of hospital care is dramatized. Peter Strauss, Brooke Bundy and Bettye Ackerman guest star.
48	22	"Perfection of Vices"	Paul Stanley	Dick Nelson	February 24, 1971
An insight into Lochner's personal life with his ex-wife (Dina Merrill) and daughter (Charlotte Stewart).
49	23	"The Man in Hiding"	Michael O'Herlihy	Barry Oringer	March 3, 1971
A once-brilliant surgeon (Richard Kiley) has become totally withdrawn. Gena Rowlands and Georg Stanford Brown guest star.
50	24	"Crossroads"	Al C. Ward	Don Brinkley	March 10, 1971
An aging doctor mistakenly believes that his medical practice is as good as ever. Pat Hingle, Lynne Marta, Robert Pine and Jan Sterling guest star.

=== Season 3 (1971–72) ===
No. overall	No. in season	Title	Directed by	Written by	Original release date
51	1	"Blood Line"	Michael Caffey	Jackson Gillis	September 15, 1971
A fugitive (William Windom) is torn between freedom and love for his anemic son. Vincent Van Patten and Percy Rodriguez guest star.
52	2	"The Corrupted"	Vincent Sherman	Frank Glicksman	September 22, 1971
A character study of an ambitious surgeon (Steve Lawrence). Pippa Scott guest stars.
53	3	"The Imposter"	Richard Benedict	Don Brinkley; James Schmerer	September 29, 1971
The long career of a highly respected country doctor (Forrest Tucker) as a bogus physician is about to be exposed. Kim Hunter and Joy Bang guest star.
54	4	"Double Jeopardy"	Vincent Sherman	Oliver Crawford	October 6, 1971
Artificial insemination plays a part in the story of a heart patient who risks her life to protect her sterile husband's pride. Stefanie Powers and Jack Kruschen guest star.
55	5	"Idolmaker"	Vincent Sherman	John Meredyth Lucas	October 13, 1971
To save her own life, a woman evangelist must make a decision that might destroy her career, her marriage and her faith. Pamela Payton-Wright and Roger Davis guest star.
56	6	"Circle of Power"	Paul Stanley	Alvin Boretz	October 20, 1971
A distinguished surgeon (Barry Sullivan) is losing the use of his hands.
57	7	"The Shattered Man"	Michael Caffey	Robert M. Young	October 27, 1971
A troubled husband (Bradford Dillman) is being treated for psychological impotence. Collin Wilcox and David Wayne guest star.
58	8	"The Albatross"	Richard Benedict	Richard Shapiro	November 3, 1971
Jonathan Crowley (Michael Douglas) is a young man whose mental retardation is spawning a family tragedy. Anne Helm, Pamela McMyler and John Ericson guest star.
59	9	"Martyr"	Richard Benedict	Dan Ullman	November 10, 1971
An iron-willed lady (Jo Van Fleet) is determined to spend her life in a wheelchair. Jess Walton and Paul Stewart guest star.
60	10	"Suspected"	Charles S. Dubin	Dick Nelson	November 17, 1971
A surgeon's past comes back to haunt him; the once-convicted sex offender is now charged with child molesting. Earl Holliman, Diana Hyland, Dianne Hull, Martin E. Brooks and Louise Latham guest star.
61	11	"The Loser"	Paul Stanley	Robert M. Young	November 24, 1971
Financial pressure from her husband and her education drive a young medical student (Susan Strasberg) to prostitution, at which point she contracts a mysterious respiratory illness. Tom Ligon, Greg Mullavey and Nancy Stephens guest star.
62	12	"The Pawn"	Charles S. Dubin	Stephen Kandel	December 1, 1971
Medical quackery is the target of a drama in which a charming fraud (George Maharis) is risking the life of a young patient. Louise Sorel, Dran Hamilton, Jonathan Goldsmith, and Charles Cioffi guest star.
63	13	"Conspiracy"	Daniel Petrie	Lou Shaw	December 8, 1971
A lung-cancer patient (Suzanne Pleshette) is determined to keep her illness a secret. Dr. Gannon must choose between jeopardizing their long-standing friendship or violating the confidence of a patient. Leslie Nielsen and Lee Montgomery guest star.
64	14	"The Nowhere Child"	Chad Everett	Pat Fielder	December 15, 1971
An 11-year-old orphan's chance for adoption is threatened by a mysterious illness. Willie Aames, Fay Spain, Diana Sands and Ed Nelson guest star.
65	15	"Shock!: Part 1"	Paul Stanley	Don Brinkley	December 29, 1971
Change-of-pace suspense drama about Dr. Gannon's involvement with an ailing tycoon and his conflict-ridden household. First of two parts. Curt Lowens, Robert F. Lyons, Sheree North, Vera Miles, and Glenn Corbett guest star.
66	16	"Shock!: Part 2"	Paul Stanley	Don Brinkley	January 5, 1972
Dr. Lochner's sister is the prime suspect in the conclusion of a murder story. Miko Mayama, John Larch, Sheree North, Vera Miles, and Glenn Corbett guest star.
67	17	"Fatal Decision"	Charles S. Dubin	Jerome Coopersmith	January 19, 1972
Dr. Gannon rekindles an old flame, a doctor with a secret past. Claudine Auger, Wendell Burton and Fritz Weaver guest star
68	18	"Terror"	Vincent Sherman	Barry Oringer	January 26, 1972
The hunt for a girl exposed to Bubonic plague brings a clash between Dr. Gannon and an officious public health officer. Kathleen Lloyd, Larry Blyden, Anthony Caruso, and Georg Stanford Brown guest star.
69	19	"Secret"	Earl Bellamy	Don Brinkley; Jackson Gillis	February 2, 1972
A doctor (Michael Callan) is driven back to alcoholism by the fear of losing his dying wife. Marianne McAndrew and Jeanette Nolan guest star.
70	20	"The Choice"	Leo Penn	Lionel E. Siegel	February 9, 1972
A young physician (Monte Markham) must choose between a career in hospital administration and general practice in a rural area where his services are badly needed. Tyne Daly, Clu Gulager and David Huddleston guest star.
71	21	"Deadlock"	Michael Caffey	Stephen Kandel	February 16, 1972
A surgeon is offered a grim choice: his kidnapped wife will be saved if he can arrange the death of a certain patient. Jo Ann Harris, Michael Tolan, Jared Martin and Susan Howard guest star.
72	22	"Awakening"	Earl Bellamy	Robert M. Young	February 23, 1972
A car-crash victim (Craig Stevens) awakes from a three-year coma to a nightmare: the crash killed his daughter and left him with an unforgiving wife. Barbara Rush and Dick Van Patten guest star.
73	23	"Confession"	Al C. Ward	Don Brinkley	March 1, 1972
The career of a young female intern is threatened when her fiance confesses to a rape he did not commit. Tisha Sterling and James Shigeta guest star.
74	24	"Conflict"	Vincent Sherman	Stephen Kandel	March 8, 1972
When Gannon is unable to save the life of a politician, the man's family threatens him with a malpractice suit. Ida Lupino, Howard Duff, James Shigeta, Meg Foster and Harry Basch guest star.

=== Season 4 (1972–73) ===
No. overall	No. in season	Title	Directed by	Written by	Original release date
75	1	"Vision of Doom"	Charles S. Dubin	Barry Oringer	September 13, 1972
A doctor (William Windom) has a premonition that his wife will die in surgery. Lynn Carlin and Susan Oliver guest star.
76	2	"Cycle of Peril"	Michael Caffey	Frank Glicksman	September 20, 1972
A woman refuses an emergency operation for fear it will endanger her pregnancy. Pamela Payton-Wright, James Stacy, Nancy Walker and Michael Masters guest star.
77	3	"Condemned"	Paul Stanley	Edward DeBlasio	September 27, 1972
The story of a growing attachment between an injured teenager and his critically ill roommate. Lola Albright, Sean Kelly and Stephen R. Hudis guest star.
78	4	"Wall of Silence"	Paul Stanley	Robert M. Young	October 4, 1972
A drama about deafness and family strife. Estelle Parsons, Tim O'Connor and Kristoffer Tabori guest star.
79	5	"The Torn Man"	Vincent Sherman	Barry Oringer	October 11, 1972
An intern marries a patient, knowing she is terminally ill, yet her death leaves him broken enough to quit medicine. Harry Guardino and Marcia Rodd guest star.
80	6	"Betrayed"	Richard Benedict	Bill Stratton	October 18, 1972
A hospital volunteer (Geraldine Page) has a horrifying secret. Martin E. Brooks, Joyce Van Patten and Charles Aidman guest star.
81	7	"Doctor and Mr. Harper"	Earl Bellamy	Karl Tunberg	November 1, 1972
A drama about an unemployed man married to a doctor. Darleen Carr, Paul Burke and Diana Muldaur guest star.
82	8	"The Fallen"	Paul Stanley	Barry Oringer	November 1, 1972
The ugly duckling story is no fairy tale to a patient who thinks she's so second-rate that she wants to die. Peter Haskell and Lee Purcell guest star.
83	9	"Tio Taco, MD"	Vincent Sherman	Karl Tunberg	November 8, 1972
Superstition vs. science as a critically ill woman refuses medical help. George Chakiris, Priscilla Garcia and Carmen Zapata guest star.
84	10	"The Outcast"	Michael Caffey	Herb Bermann	November 15, 1972
A cancer researcher, once convicted of second-degree murder in a mercy killing, is suspected when a patient's life-support systems are cut off. Ken Howard, Louise Sorel and Kay Medford guest star.
85	11	"No Sanctuary"	Vincent Sherman	Don Brinkley	November 22, 1972
A nun (Shelby Grant) has secrets that are hindering her recovery from a beating and rape. Mary McCarty and Simon Oakland guest star.
86	12	"Gladiator"	Earl Bellamy	Don Brinkley; Oliver Crawford	November 29, 1972
Problems for a college football hero include a drug addiction, a serious illness and a disabled wife. William Devane, Leslie Charleson and Joe Kapp guest star.
87	13	"No Way Out"	Richard Benedict	A. Martin Zweiback	December 6, 1972
A doctor's puzzling spells of fatigue are hampering her work. Lois Nettleton, Will Geer and Scott Jacoby guest star.
88	14	"A Game for One Player"	Earl Bellamy	Stephen Kandel	December 13, 1972
A tortured relationship evolves between a lonely widow and the doctor who blames himself for her husband's death. Patricia Harty, Jessica Walter and Robert Foxworth guest star.
89	15	"Pressure Point"	Paul Stanley	Barry Oringer	December 20, 1972
When his wife becomes mentally ill, a brilliant surgeon (Bill Bixby) must choose between abandoning his career and institutionalizing her. Joanna Miles and Dianne Hull guest star.
90	16	"Question of Guilt"	Michael Caffey	Larry Brody; Jack Guss	January 3, 1973
A female convict's bitterness is threatening her success in a medical training program. Brenda Scott, Shelly Novack and Bettye Ackerman guest star.
91	17	"Judgment"	Paul Stanley	Mark Weingart	January 10, 1973
The story of a desperately lonely hospital volunteer (Ruth Buzzi). Tom Bosley and Sheila Larken guest star.
92	18	"End of the Line"	Earl Bellamy	Karl Tunberg	January 17, 1973
A high-wire performer's illness might kill her if she continues her career. Dean Jagger, Jeanette Nolan, Lynne Marta and John Ritter guest star.
93	19	"Between Two Fires"	Murray Golden	Roy Baldwin; Don Brinkley	January 24, 1973
A surgeon's new procedure might save his dying wife, if he can conquer his drug addiction in time to operate. Larry Hagman and Barbara Feldon guest star.
94	20	"Night Cry"	Earl Bellamy	Don Brinkley; Robert J. Shaw	January 31, 1973
Drama about the future of an illegitimate child whose father has been critically injured. Brandon Cruz, William Kerwin and Marlyn Mason guest star.
95	21	"No Margin for Error"	Paul Stanley	Barry Oringer	February 7, 1973
A famous doctor's (Celeste Holm) own vital surgery must be delayed to help a man with a live bomb lodged in his chest. Jack Kruschen and Ramon Bieri guest star.
96	22	"Impact"	Earl Bellamy	Jack Guss	February 14, 1973
An ailing boy's divorced parents can't agree whether to permit surgery. Earl Holliman and Barbara Rush guest star.
97	23	"Fatal Memory"	Paul Stanley	Al C. Ward	February 21, 1973
A woman (Stefanie Powers) refuses to admit symptoms of a serious illness. Gary Merrill and Michael Parks guest star.
98	24	"Vortex"	Al C. Ward	Don Brinkley	February 28, 1973
Dr. Lochner's one-time fiancee has a beautiful daughter who's gravely ill. Jim Backus and Dana Wynter guest star.

=== Season 5 (1973–74) ===
No. overall	No. in season	Title	Directed by	Written by	Original release date
99	1	"The Guilty"	Paul Stanley	Don Brinkley	September 10, 1973
A young woman is stricken with hysterical paralysis after seeing her mother with a lover. Belinda Montgomery, Steve Forrest, Julie Harris and Stephen Brooks guest star.
100	2	"Time of Darkness"	Michael Caffey	Don Brinkley; Barry Oringer	September 17, 1973
An emergency call to a mountain community leads Gannon to a patient guarded by mysterious, gun-toting townsfolk. Claude Akins, Pamela Franklin and Jo Van Fleet guest star.
101	3	"Broken Image"	Paul Stanley	Barry Oringer	September 24, 1973
Bent on proving his virility, an aging surgeon becomes involved with a young patient. William Windom and Laraine Day guest star.
102	4	"Impasse"	Vincent Sherman	Barry Oringer	October 1, 1973
A lesbian psychiatrist (Lois Nettleton) battles to save her patient. Close to untangling a young woman's problems, the doctor finds herself hampered by prejudice against her own lifestyle. Tim Matheson, Jamie Smith-Jackson and Nick Nolte guest star.
103	5	"Clash of Shadows"	Paul Stanley	Martin Roth	October 8, 1973
The horror of crib death (Sudden infant death syndrome) is explored in this story about a couple who lose their four-month-old child. Martin Sheen and Diane Baker guest star.
104	6	"The Casualty"	Lee Philips	Jack Guss	October 22, 1973
Romance ends for Dr. Gannon when his girlfriend's husband, missing in action for six years in the Vietnam War, comes home to reclaim his wife and son. Joseph Campanella and Barbara Anderson guest star.
105	7	"Stranger in Two Worlds"	Vincent Sherman	Stephen Kandel	October 29, 1973
A champion diver is ignoring an illness that could end her career. Lynne Marta, Andrew Duggan, Gary Lockwood and Joan Blondell guest star.
106	8	"Child of Violence"	Unknown	Unknown	November 12, 1973
A wounded child from war-torn Northern Ireland baffles Gannon by showing no desire to get well. Louise Fletcher, Gena Rowlands and Lee Montgomery guest star.
107	9	"Woman for Hire"	Vincent Sherman	Barry Oringer	November 19, 1973
An idealistic young resident falls in love with an ailing prostitute. Jessica Walter, Barry Primus and Harold J. Stone guest star.
108	10	"A Life at Stake"	Joseph Pevney	Don Brinkley; Karl Tunberg	November 26, 1973
Compulsive gambling is ruining the life of a once-fine surgeon. Stefanie Powers, Bradford Dillman and Davis Roberts guest star.
109	11	"Nightmare"	Michael Caffey	Barry Oringer	December 3, 1973
Gannon is receiving bloodcurdling murder threats that contain only one clue: the would-be killer is someone on the hospital staff. William Devane and Perry King guest star.
110	12	"Deadly Game"	Vincent Sherman	Martin Roth	December 10, 1973
A derelict (Tyne Daly) fakes her way into the hospital for free room and board, unaware that she is suffering from a serious disease. Kay Medford and Bruce Kirby guest star.
111	13	"Web of Intrigue"	Michael Caffey	Jack Guss; William Wood	January 7, 1974
A wealthy, pampered patient's influence helps an arrogant young resident who's refusing to submit to authority. Michael Brandon, Celeste Holm and Meg Foster guest star.
112	14	"Trial by Knife"	Murray Golden	Oliver Crawford	January 14, 1974
Sparks fly when Dr. Gannon and the newly appointed chief of surgery begin to clash on medical opinions. Felton Perry, Judy Pace, Rosemary Murphy and Ivan Bonar guest star.
113	15	"Choice of Evils"	Earl Bellamy	Jerry de Bono; Jack Guss	January 21, 1974
A proud man must decide whether to live with a dangerous illness, or submit to surgery which might cause impotence. Paul Burke, Jill Clayburgh and Barbara Rush guest star.
114	16	"No Escape"	Murray Golden	Jack Guss	January 28, 1974
Gannon's patient needs a kidney transplant, and her only hope of a compatible donor is her father — a convict who is serving time for murder. Cameron Mitchell, Ayn Ruymen and Lola Albright guest star.
115	17	"Dark Warning"	Earl Bellamy	Martin Roth	February 11, 1974
A seriously ill surgeon tries to hide his condition long enough to perform lifesaving surgery on his ex-wife. David Hedison and Joanna Miles guest star.
116	18	"Girl from Bedlam"	Vincent Sherman	Don Brinkley	February 18, 1974
While investigating conditions in a mental hospital, Gannon falls in love with an amnesiac whose blinding headaches have gone untreated by the staff. Joanna Pettet, Murray Hamilton and Leonard Frey guest star.
117	19	"The Spectre"	Earl Bellamy	Barry Oringer	February 25, 1974
Determined to save a critically ill patient, a surgeon is hiding his own serious malady from his colleagues. Stockard Channing, Dean Jones and James Griffith guest star.
118	20	"The Enemies"	Lee Philips	Jack Guss	March 4, 1974
A young genius (Willie Aames) becomes the center of a custody battle between his critically ill mother (Anne Meara) and a wealthy, would-be benefactress (Carol Lawrence).
119	21	"The Conspirators"	Earl Bellamy	Don Brinkley	March 11, 1974
An accused rapist may not live to see a fair trial. The victim's boyfriend has already beaten him severely, and is waiting to finish the job. Kay Lenz, John David Carson and Nick Nolte guest star.
120	22	"The World's Balloon"	Michael Caffey	Martin Roth	March 25, 1974
An impoverished ventriloquist may lose custody of his orphaned nephew when the boy develops a serious heart condition. Dom DeLuise, Norman Fell, Lee Montgomery and Beverly Garland guest star.
121	23	"Hexed"	Lee Philips	Barry Oringer	April 1, 1974
A staff doctor thinks a patient's baffling symptoms are the result of a voodoo curse. Peter Haskell, Rosa Turich, Louise Sorel and Will Geer guest star.
122	24	"Appointment with Danger"	Unknown	Unknown	April 15, 1974
A critically ill scientist is determined to attend an important European conference, despite Gannon's warnings that the trip might kill her. Diana Ewing, Leif Erickson, Gary Coleman, Percy Rodriguez and Nancy Kelly guest star.

=== Season 6 (1974–75) ===
No. overall	No. in season	Title	Directed by	Written by	Original release date
123	1	"Adults Only"	Robert L. Friend	Jack Guss	September 9, 1974
After learning that his wife is a pornographic-movie star, a gifted surgeon wants to leave the hospital. Joan Van Ark, Gale Sondergaard and Monte Markham guest star.
124	2	"Demi-God"	Joseph Pevney	Martin Roth	September 16, 1974
A cancer patient doesn't know whether or not to believe her faith-healer husband's assurances that he can cure her. Meredith Baxter, Jacqueline Scott, Marjoe Gortner and John Marley guest star.
125	3	"The Faces of Peril"	Michael Caffey	Barry Oringer	September 23, 1974
Pregnant and racked by a contagious disease, Gannon's mistrustful patient refuses to divulge information about herself that might prevent a deadly epidemic. John Randolph, Andrea Marcovicci, Eric Server and Robert Walden guest star.
126	4	"Three-Cornered Cage"	Vincent Sherman	Howard Dimsdale	September 30, 1974
A husband anguishes over the responsibility he feels toward his ill wife and the love he feels for her best friend. Diane Baker, Dennis Cole and Diana Hyland guest star.
127	5	"The Shattered Mask"	Murray Golden	Phyllis White; Robert White	October 7, 1974
A mechanic is oddly reluctant to consent to an operation for his wheelchair-using daughter (Deborah Winters). Cameron Mitchell also guest stars.
128	6	"May God Have Mercy"	Michael Caffey	Jack Guss	October 21, 1974
A former priest (Tim O'Connor) is captivated by a second-rate nightclub singer (Rita Moreno) who faces a dangerous operation. Vic Tayback also guest stars.
129	7	"The Prisoners"	Unknown	Unknown	October 28, 1974
A convict who agrees to participate in a cancer-research experiment tries to sabotage the project. Shelby Grant and James Wainwright guest star.
130	8	"The Bribe"	Michael Caffey	Jack Guss	November 4, 1974
A woman of high social status can buy just about anything, except the happiness of her dying daughter. Pamela Franklin, Vera Miles and Peter Coffield guest star.
131	9	"Tainted Lady"	Robert Douglas	Don Brinkley; Edmund Morris	November 11, 1974
After a woman undergoes a radical mastectomy, she faces a wall of discrimination with her boyfriend, daughter and her employer. Shirley Knight, Jane Actman, Lloyd Bochner and Madge Sinclair guest star.
132	10	"Heel of the Tyrant"	Earl Bellamy	Don Brinkley	November 18, 1974
A Jewish researcher is harassed by young anti-Semites who are led by a hospital orderly. John Colicos, Katherine Helmond and Louise Latham guest star.
133	11	"Three on a Tightrope"	Murray Golden	Martin Roth	November 25, 1974
The health of a heart patient may be in jeopardy due to her emotional involvement with a mentally ill man. Kristina Holland and Richard Hatch guest star.
134	12	"Midwife"	Unknown	Unknown	December 2, 1974
A pregnant young widow (Brooke Bundy), arrested for unlawful midwifery, learns that she has cervical cancer. Pat Hingle, Carmen Zapata and John Larch guest star.
135	13	"Kiss and Kill"	Earl Bellamy	Stephen Kandel	December 9, 1974
A conniving young patient (Belinda J. Montgomery) tries to drive a wedge between a wealthy woman (Kim Hunter) and her clinging son (David Soul). Dolores Sutton and Paul Carr also guest star.
136	14	"Saturday's Child"	Earl Bellamy	Nate Monaster	December 16, 1974
An adolescent girl needs surgery, but she won't help Gannon locate her parents so he can get their consent. Kathleen Lloyd, John Travolta, Ivan Bonar and Paula Kelly guest star.
137	15	"The Hostile Heart"	Robert Douglas	Hesper Anderson	December 30, 1974
Deciding to donate your child's organ is a hard place to be in if you are the parent of a fatally injured son or daughter. But will the need for a heart make the decision even harder if the recipient is an orphan? Peter Haskell, Lois Nettleton and Rodney Allen Rippy guest star.
138	16	"No Way Home"	Paul Stanley	Don Brinkley	January 6, 1975
A former movie star's will to live is undermined by a failing marriage and ill health. Joseph Campanella, Cyd Charisse, Eddie Fontaine, Joe Silver and Paul Brinegar guest star.
139	17	"The Captives"	Lee Philips	Jack Guss	January 13, 1975
A pregnant nurse doesn't want to raise a second child without the help of her errant husband. Marcia Rodd, Jodie Foster and Jerry Orbach guest star.
140	18	"Crown of Thorns"	Murray Golden	Stephen Kandel	February 3, 1975
Refusing to accept the office and duties of her European heritage, Princess Andrea (Suzy Kendall) breaks away from her handlers and soon ends up in the presence of Dr. Joe Gannon. Eduard Franz also stars.
141	19	"The Invisible Wife"	Unknown	Unknown	February 10, 1975
The ailing and neglected wife of a charismatic politician asks Gannon to keep her presence in the hospital a secret. Ed Nelson, Penny Fuller, Catherine Ferrar and Beverly Garland guest star.
142	20	"If Mine Eye Offends Me"	Murray Golden	Howard Dimsdale	February 24, 1975
A pedophile charged and convicted of child molestation is given a choice: take a drug that may make him impotent and go free, or don't and stay in prison. Brock Peters, David Birney, Donna Mills and Jack Hogan guest star.
143	21	"Survivors"	Vincent Sherman	Barry Oringer	March 3, 1975
Friendships become competition as a dozen medical students vie for the only seven positions that are available as interns. Peter Strauss, Mimi Maynard, Richard Lawson, Darleen Carr and Ed Begley Jr. guest star.
144	22	"Aftershock"	Joseph Pevney	Martin Roth	March 10, 1975
Time and air are running out for Dr. Joe Gannon and others who are trapped in the hospital's basement following an explosion. Vincent Beck, Jack Kruschen, Louise Sorel and Dabney Coleman guest star.
145	23	"Half a Life"	Unknown	Unknown	March 17, 1975
After contracting a deadly disease, a surgeon requires blood transfusions from his sister twice a week for the next few years. Only she's now in Greece, in love with a tour leader and reluctant to return home. Ken Berry, Cesare Danova and Sheree North guest star.
146	24	"The Rip-Off"	Unknown	Unknown	March 24, 1975
A rock star, secretly deaf in his left ear, refuses a risky operation on his right. Desi Arnaz Jr., Parley Baer, Michael Swan, Dianne Hull and James Coco guest star

=== Season 7 (1975–76) ===
No. overall	No. in season	Title	Directed by	Written by	Original release date
147	1	"The Fourth Sex: Part 1"	Vincent Sherman	Rita Lakin	September 8, 1975
A famed surgeon (Robert Reed) shocks family and colleagues by requesting a sex-change operation. Salome Jens guest stars.
148	2	"The Fourth Sex: Part 2"	Vincent Sherman	Rita Lakin	September 15, 1975
The family of the surgeon refuse to support his wishes of becoming a woman through surgery when his request for the operation is turned down. Robert Reed, Salome Jens, Gary Frank, Louise Sorel and Dennis Cole guest star.
149	3	"Torment"	Joseph Pevney	Barry Oringer	September 22, 1975
On his 36th birthday, Gannon is suddenly beset by peculiar emotional and physical symptoms. Willie Aames, Philip Abbott, Florence Henderson, and Robert Walden guest star.
150	4	"No Hiding Place"	Joseph Pevney	Stephen Kandel	September 29, 1975
A delirious war veteran accuses a doctor of slaughtering women and children in Vietnam. Peter Haskell, John Karlen, Robbie Rist, and Susan Sullivan guest star.
151	5	"The Velvet Knife"	Unknown	Unknown	October 6, 1975
Gannon has a new love interest (Meredith Baxter), but his affection is being tried by her unreasonable demand to be constantly reassured of his feelings. Michael Callan and Steve Allen guest star.
152	6	"Street Girl"	Vincent Sherman	Jack Guss	October 20, 1975
The teenage daughter (Linda Purl) of a busy surgeon turns to prostitution in a bid for attention. Gail Fisher, Arch Johnson, Dick Van Patten, and Dana Wynter guest star.
153	7	"The Price of a Child"	Daniel Haller	Jack Guss	October 29, 1975
The son of a wealthy Middle Eastern oil magnate upsets Medical Center operations with his "money buys everything" attitude. Keith Gordon, Louise Lasser, Shelley Fabares and Dick Shawn guest star.
154	8	"Too Late for Tomorrow"	Paul Stanley	Robert Lewin	November 3, 1975
Dr. Tarkington (Patrick O'Neal), an esteemed surgeon, learns he has a terminal illness. He decides to spend his last days doing things he put off while pursuing his career. Joan Van Ark and Keenan Wynn also guest star.
155	9	"The Last Performance"	Murray Golden	Don Appell	November 10, 1975
Lochner's former sweetheart (Roberta Peters), a celebrated singer, enters Medical Center suffering from unexplained fainting spells. Audrey Christie and George Chakiris guest star.
156	10	"Two Against Death"	Robert Douglas	Hindi Brooks	November 17, 1975
An 18-year-old girl needing a critical operation is the key to bringing a doctor's son out of a catatonic state. Doris Roberts, Melanie Mayron and Jack Hogan guest star.
157	11	"One Last Rebellion"	Robert Douglas	Howard Dimsdale	November 24, 1975
A young woman confined to a nursing home encourages her elderly fellow inmates to rebel against the home's poor conditions. Belinda Montgomery, Davis Roberts, Andrea King and Ruth McDevitt guest star
158	12	"The Eighth Deadly Sin"	Earl Bellamy	John D. Hess	December 1, 1975
An aging surgeon (Ralph Bellamy) who has begun to make serious mistakes plans to operate on his granddaughter. Jane Wyatt, Darleen Carr and Robert Walden guest star.
159	13	"Gift from a Killer"	Unknown	Unknown	December 8, 1975
Dr. Gannon must convince an escaped convict to risk capture in order to save the life of a dying child. Tyne Daly, Herb Edelman, Nora Marlowe and Shelly Novack guest star.
160	14	"The High Cost of Winning"	Earl Bellamy	Howard Dimsdale	December 15, 1975
A hospitalized tennis player (Erik Estrada) is attracted to an unhappy girl who is facing heart surgery. Cesar Romero and Lynne Marta guest star.
161	15	"The Silent Witness"	Unknown	Unknown	December 29, 1975
A lonely nurse stubbornly refuses to press charges against a man who brutally beat her. Charles Cioffi, Joby Baker, Ivan Bonar and Kate Reid guest star.
162	16	"A Very Private War"	Vincent Sherman	Jeff Kanter	January 12, 1976
Gannon is attracted to a Soviet doctor (Victoria Fyodorova) visiting Medical Center on a special assignment. Theodore Bikel and Leigh McCloskey guest star.
163	17	"You Can't Annul My Baby"	Earl Bellamy	Howard Dimsdale	January 19, 1976
Gannon treats a childlike teenager who's the mother of a baby with a congenital heart defect. Kathleen Beller and Mark Hamill guest star.
164	18	"Child of Conflict"	Unknown	Unknown	February 2, 1976
The adoption of a Vietnamese orphan is complicated when the real mother (France Nuyen) shows up. Fionnula Flanagan and Don Galloway guest star.
165	19	"The Stranger"	Unknown	Unknown	February 9, 1976
The hospitalized victim of a mysterious attacker suffers from a domineering mother and recurring headaches. Catherine Burns, Julie Adams, Kathryn Walker and Ivan Bonar guest star.
166	20	"A Touch of Sight"	Unknown	Howard Dimsdale	February 16, 1976
Gannon treats a young doctor blinded in a shooting accident. David Birney, Susan Strasberg and Vic Tayback guest star.
167	21	"Life, Death and Mrs. Armbruster"	Chad Everett	Don Brinkley	February 23, 1976
The mother (Totie Fields) of a dismissed young resident refuses to have a lifesaving operation unless her son is reinstated. Ron Rifkin and Stanley Adams guest star.
168	22	"Major Annie, MD"	Vincent Sherman	Don Brinkley	March 1, 1976
An Army doctor (Lois Nettleton) searches for answers when her assistant suffers an inexplicable seizure. John Gavin, Della Reese and John Randolph guest star.
169	23	"The Happy State of Depression"	Al C. Ward	Jack Guss	March 8, 1976
A misanthropic con artist (Don Rickles) and an awkward innocent (Ruth Buzzi) share an offbeat relationship while being treated at the hospital. Gary Sandy also stars.
170	24	"If Wishes Were Horses"	Unknown	Unknown	March 15, 1976
Skill, cunning and some good-hearted larceny help three ex-Medical Center physicians keep their ramshackle community hospital operating in a tough part of town. Scott Hylands, William Redfield, Kim Richards, Percy Rodriguez, William Windom, Mary McCarty and Philip Michael Thomas guest star.
