= Hagen (TV series) =

American television miniseries

- Genre: Legal drama Action
- Created by: Charles Larson; Frank Glicksman
- Starring: Arthur Hill; Chad Everett
- Country of origin: United States
- Original language: English
- No. of seasons: 1
- No. of episodes: 9 (2 unaired)

Production
- Producer: Frank Glicksman
- Running time: 44 minutes (approximately)
- Production companies: Frank Glicksman Productions; Chad Everett Productions; 20th Century Fox Television

Original release
- Network: CBS
- Release: March 15 – April 24, 1980

Hagen is an American legal drama miniseries. It originally aired on CBS from March 15 to April 24, 1980. The series stars Chad Everett as Paul Hagen, an outdoor enthusiast employed by a San Francisco-based law firm headed by lawyer Carl Palmer (played by Arthur Hill). CBS and producer Frank Glicksman created the series for Everett, who was seeking a more action-oriented role after the cancellation of Medical Center. The series was met with general negative reception, with many critics panning the show's writing.

== Plot ==
Paul Hagen, an outdoor enthusiast from Idaho, is hired as an investigator for San Francisco-based lawyer Carl Palmer and his law firm. Hagen uses his expertise of nature and hunting to serve as an investigator for the firm and track down criminals.

== Cast ==
- Chad Everett as Paul Hagen, an outdoor enthusiast and investigator
- Arthur Hill as Carl Palmer, a lawyer
- Aldine King as Jody, Palmer's secretary
- Carmen Zapata as Mrs. Chavez, Hagen's housekeeper

== Development ==
Hagen was initially developed in 1980 by CBS and producer Frank Glicksman. Chad Everett wanted to star in a series with more "action" than his previous roles, such as Dr. Joe Gannon on Medical Center, which had ended in 1976. Network executives offered Everett input in creating a series with Glicksman, who created Medical Center. Both Glicksman and Everett wanted a "strong" supporting character and conceptualized the character of Carl Palmer. Both of them initially expressed concern over this role, as they had previously conflicted with actor James Daly on Medical Center due to his concerns that he was not receiving enough screen time relative to Everett. Arthur Hill chose the role because he found the concept appealing, and thought the relationship between the characters was more important than the amount of lines spoken by either. The network created a pilot episode which was previewed for television critics in the Los Angeles area. Due to negative reception of the pilot episode, CBS retooled a number of elements such as Hagen's use of "backwoods" slang. Despite the retool, the pilot episode aired on CBS on March 15, 1980.

== Episodes ==
No.	Title	Directed by	Written by	Original release date
1	"Pilot"	Paul Wendkos	Unknown	March 15, 1980
Hagen moves from Idaho to San Francisco to search for a missing friend.
2	"The Straw Man"	Michael Caffey	Charles Larson	March 22, 1980
Hagen protects a woman who wants to give her cosmetics company to her daughter, despite objections from her creditor.
3	"Hear No Evil"	Vincent Sherman	Unknown	March 29, 1980
A friend of Hagen's is killed under mysterious circumstances while trying to escape from prison.
4	"Trauma"	Alex March	Unknown	April 5, 1980
The estranged husband of a woman with amnesia, was murdered.
5	"Jeopardy"	Seymour Robbie	Unknown	April 10, 1980
Hagen is hired by a jewelry shop owner to retrieve 2 million stolen dollars.
6	"Nightmare"	Joseph Pevney	Unknown	April 17, 1980
Hagen receives threats while trying to find a man who has been missing for eight years.
7	"More Deadly Poison"	Michael Caffey	Unknown	April 24, 1980
A mental patient is accused of poisoning her stepmother and roommate.
8	"The Rat Pack"	N/A	N/A	Unaired
Hagen thinks a 17-year-old is falsely accused of murder.
9	"King of the Hill"	Jack B. Sowards	Jack B. Sowards	Unaired
A friend of Hagen is killed after a jailbreak.

== Reception ==
Hagen was met with generally negative critical reception. Lee Winfrey of Knight Ridder news service, in an article republished in The Boston Globe, criticized the pilot for having "farfetched" scenes, as well as Hagen's use of slang. Although he found the main episodes "mundane", he praised Zapata's role as Mrs. Chavez. Earle Copp of The Free Lance-Star criticized the episodes' plot lines as "cliché-ridden". Writing for the Hartford Courant, Owen McNally praised Everett's "easy-going" role as the title character, but also found the series' dialogue and plots to be uninspired. All three also thought the character of Carl Palmer was under-used.
