= List of Trapper John, M.D. episodes =

The following is a list of episodes in the CBS TV series Trapper John, M.D.

Much like its parent show M*A*S*H, some episodes were held over from past seasons. Four episodes from Season 3 were filmed towards the end of Season 2, one episode from Season 4 was filmed towards the end of Season 3, and one episode from Season 5 was filmed towards the end of Season 4.

== Series overview ==
Season	Episodes	Originally released	
Season	Episodes	First released	Last released
1	22	September 23, 1979	March 30, 1980
2	18	November 23, 1980	May 17, 1981
3	25	October 4, 1981	May 16, 1982
4	22	September 26, 1982	April 3, 1983
5	22	October 2, 1983	May 6, 1984
6	23	September 30, 1984	May 5, 1985
7	19	October 6, 1985	September 4, 1986

== Episodes ==
=== Season 1 (1979–80) ===
No. overall	No. in season	Title	Directed by	Written by	Original release date	Prod. code
1	1	"Pilot"	Jackie Cooper	Don Brinkley	September 23, 1979	A-910
The first episode features pictures from the set of M*A*S*H, including a picture of Wayne Rogers as Trapper and Alan Alda as Hawkeye, which would link the series to the continuity of M*A*S*H. Both Hawkeye and Radar are referred to in the first scene. The character of Starch was also apparently in the 4077th with Trapper. This series also uses a PA Announcement character, although, similar to AfterMASH, to a lesser extent. Special Guest Star Roddy McDowall.
2	2	"Flashback"	Murray Golden	Erik Tarloff	September 30, 1979	V-403
Special Guest Star James Coco
3	3	"Deadly Exposure"	Joseph Penvey	Story by : Jim Rogers; Teleplay by : Don Brinkley & Jim Rogers	October 7, 1979	V-407
4	4	"Love is a Three-Way Street"	Marc Daniels	Don Brinkley	October 21, 1979	V-401
5	5	"The Shattered Image"	Corey Allen	Shimon Wincelberg	October 28, 1979	V-404
Special Guest Star Shelley Long, who is trying to get a job at San Francisco Memorial Hospital, but despite being a brilliant nurse's aid, she finds difficulty due to her past.
6	6	"What Are Friends For?"	Ralph Senensky	Ray Brenner	November 11, 1979	V-408
First appearance of O'Malley.
7	7	"One For My Baby"	Bernard McEveety	Charles Larson and Deborah Zoe Dawson & Victoria Johns	November 18, 1979	V-409
The staff at SFMH help a teenage boy with alcoholism.
8	8	"Taxi in the Rain"	Barry Crane	Story by : Shimon Wincelberg and Larry Arnstein & David Hurwitz; Teleplay by : Shimon Wincelberg	December 2, 1979	V-410
9	9	"Licensed to Kill"	Bernard McEveety	Deborah Zoe Dawson & Victoria Johns	December 9, 1979	V-411
10	10	"The Surrogate"	Alex March	Don Brinkley	December 23, 1979	V-405
11	11	"Whose Little Hero Are You?"	Robert Douglas	Don Brinkley	December 30, 1979	V-402
12	12	"Boom!"	Seymour Robbie	Don Brinkley	January 6, 1980	V-412
13	13	"Have You Hugged Your Nurse Today?"	Ralph Levy	Deborah Zoe Dawson & Victoria Johns	January 13, 1980	V-406
14	14	"Missionary's Downfall"	Joseph Pevney	Story by : Ray Brenner; Teleplay by : Don Brinkley	January 27, 1980	V-414
15	15	"Warning: I May Be Hazardous to Your Health"	Alf Kjellin	Deborah Zoe Dawson & Victoria Johns	February 3, 1980	V-413
16	16	"'Til Life Do Us Part"	Bernard McEveety	Jack Guss	February 10, 1980	V-417
17	17	"If You Can't Stand the Heat"	Murray Golden	Deborah Zoe Dawson & Victoria Johns	February 17, 1980	V-416
18	18	"Strike!"	Alex March	Kenneth Berg	February 24, 1980	V-418
19	19	"It's a Wise Surgeon"	Robert Douglas	Jack Guss	March 2, 1980	V-415
20	20	"Short Odds"	Murray Golden	Jeff Stuart	March 9, 1980	V-419
21	21	"Quarantine"	Seymour Robbie	Deborah Zoe Dawson & Victoria Johns	March 23, 1980	V-420
22	22	"Hot Line"	Barry Crane	J.B. Hall	March 30, 1980	V-421
Last appearance of Clara "Starch" Willoughby. "In Girl Under Glass", her character is said to have gotten married, moved away and retired. Note: Starch was written out due to Mary McCarty, who played her, having died on April 30, 1980, exactly a month after this episode.

=== Season 2 (1980–81) ===
No. overall	No. in season	Title	Directed by	Written by	Original release date	Prod. code
23	1	"Girl Under Glass: Part 1"	Bernard McEveety	Don Brinkley	November 23, 1980	Z-501
First appearance of Ernestine Shoop. Gonzo gets romantically involved with a patient. Guest appearance: Robert Vaughn
24	2	"Girl Under Glass: Part 2"	Bernard McEveety	Don Brinkley	November 30, 1980	Z-502
Continuation from previous episode. Second appearance of Robert Vaughn.
25	3	"Slim Chance"	Seymour Robbie	Judy Merl & Paul Eric Myers	December 7, 1980	Z-503
26	4	"Call Me Irresponsible"	Robert Douglas	Charles Larson	December 21, 1980	Z-505
27	5	"Creepy Time Gal"	Barry Crane	Deborah Zoe Dawson & Victoria Johns	January 4, 1981	Z-504
28	6	"Straight and Narrow"	Seymour Robbie	Barbara Avedon & Christopher Haun	January 11, 1981	Z-506
29	7	"Earthquake"	Robert Douglas	Phil Alden Robinson & Betty Goldberg	January 18, 1981	Z-507
30	8	"The Pagoda Cure"	Seymour Robbie	Milt Rosen	January 25, 1981	Z-508
31	9	"Have I Got a Girl For You"	Joseph Pevney	Deborah Zoe Dawson & Victoria Johns	February 1, 1981	Z-509
32	10	"Who's the Lucky Father?"	Michael Caffey	Jack Guss	February 15, 1981	Z-510
33	11	"Family Affair"	Joseph Pevney	Story by : Paul Harrison; Teleplay by : Charles Larson	February 22, 1981	Z-511
34	12	"Finders Keepers"	Seymour Robbie	Story by : Jody Ann Ranney; Teleplay by : Deborah Zoe Dawson & Victoria Johns and Jody Ann Ranney	March 8, 1981	Z-512
35	13	"Days of Wine and Leo"	Joseph Pevney	Jack Guss	March 15, 1981	Z-513
36	14	"A Case of the Crazies"	Seymour Robbie	James Fritzhand	March 29, 1981	Z-514
37	15	"Second Sight"	Jeff Bleckner	Jeff Stuart	April 5, 1981	Z-515
38	16	"King of the Road"	Bernard McEveety	Story by : Milt Rosen; Teleplay by : Milt Rosen & Don Brinkley	May 3, 1981	Z-516
39	17	"Albatross"	Michael Preece	Charles Larson	May 10, 1981	Z-517
40	18	"Brain Child"	Barry Crane	Deborah Zoe Dawson & Victoria Johns	May 17, 1981	Z-518

=== Season 3 (1981–82) ===
No. overall	No. in season	Title	Directed by	Written by	Original release date	Prod. code
41	1	"That Old Gang of Mine"	Bob Sweeney	Jack Guss	October 4, 1981	Z-521
42	2	"C.O.D."	Joseph Pevney	Betty Goldberg & Phil Alden Robinson	October 11, 1981	Z-522
43	3	"Give 'Till It Hurts"	Barry Crane	Eric Edson	October 18, 1981	Z-520
44	4	"Hate Is Enough"	Bernard McEveety	Don Brinkley	October 25, 1981	1-M01
45	5	"The Ego Experience"	Richard A. Colla	Story by : James Fritzhand; Teleplay by : Jeff Stuart & James Fritzhand	November 8, 1981	1-M02
46	6	"Cooperative Care"	Joseph Pevney	Story by : Ken Berg & Jeff Stuart; Teleplay by : Jeff Stuart	November 15, 1981	Z-519
47	7	"Is There a Doctor in the Big House?"	Bernard McEveety	Sanford Minton	November 29, 1981	1-M03
48	8	"Mother Dearest"	Alex March	Story by : Milt Rosen; Teleplay by : Deborah Zoe Dawson & Victoria Johns	December 6, 1981	1-M05
49	9	"'Tis the Season" "The Season"	Michael Caffey	John Whelpley	December 20, 1981	1-M04
50	10	"Future Imperfect"	Vincent Sherman	Charles Larson	December 27, 1981	1-M06
51	11	"42"	Michael Caffey	Story by : Marc Sirinsky & Betty Goldberg; Teleplay by : Jeff Stuart	January 3, 1982	1-M07
52	12	"Victims"	Bernard McEveety	Jim Rogers	January 10, 1982	1-M08
53	13	"Angel of Mercy"	Leo Penn	Jeffrey Ferro	January 17, 1982	1-M09
54	14	"Danny"	Bernard McEveety	Jeffrey Ferro	January 24, 1982	1-M10
55	15	"Ladies in Waiting"	Barry Crane	Jack V. Fogarty	January 31, 1982	1-M11
56	16	"The Peter Pan Syndrome"	Seymour Robbie	Annie Caroline Schuler	February 7, 1982	1-M12
57	17	"Medicine Man"	Barry Crane	John Whelpley	February 21, 1982	1-M13
58	18	"Maybe Baby"	Seymour Robbie	Kay Bender	March 7, 1982	1-M14
59	19	"Love and Marriage"	Bob Sweeney	Sharyn Abramhoff	March 14, 1982	1-M15
60	20	"Candy Doctor"	Jeff Bleckner	Richard Morgan	March 21, 1982	1-M16
61	21	"Doctors and Other Strangers"	Bob Sweeney	Deborah Zoe Dawson & Victoria Johns	March 28, 1982	1-M17
62	22	"A Piece of the Action"	Bernard McEveety	Brad Radnitz	April 11, 1982	1-M18
63	23	"Cause for Concern"	Michael Caffey	Kay Bender	April 18, 1982	1-M20
64	24	"John's Other Life"	Earl Bellamy	Jerry Ross	May 2, 1982	1-M21
65	25	"The One and Only"	Charles Siebert	Jeff Stuart	May 16, 1982	1-M22

=== Season 4 (1982–83) ===
No. overall	No. in season	Title	Directed by	Written by	Original release date	Prod. code
66	1	"Don't Rain on My Charade"	Earl Bellamy	Deborah Zoe Dawson & Victoria Johns	September 26, 1982	1-M19
67	2	"Truth and Consequences: Part 1"	Earl Bellamy	Deborah Zoe Dawson & Victoria Johns	October 3, 1982	8-B02
68	3	"Truth and Consequences: Part 2"	Earl Bellamy	Deborah Zoe Dawson & Victoria Johns	October 10, 1982	8-B03
69	4	"Three on a Mismatch"	Michael Caffey	Jeff Stuart	October 17, 1982	8-B01
70	5	"The Object of My Affliction"	Michael Caffey	John Whelpley	October 24, 1982	8-B04
71	6	"You Pays Your Money"	Earl Bellamy	Kay Bender	October 31, 1982	8-B05
72	7	"The Ransom"	Barry Crane	Story by : Jeffrey Ferro; Teleplay by : Jeffrey Ferro & Jeff Stuart	November 7, 1982	8-B07
73	8	"Thanks for Giving"	Michael Caffey	Phyllis Wapner & Nancy Bond	November 21, 1982	8-B06
74	9	"The Good Life"	Michael Caffey	Deborah Gilliand & Robert Sonntag	November 28, 1982	8-B08
75	10	"Getting to Know You"	Barry Crane	Martin Donovan	December 12, 1982	8-B09
76	11	"Russians and Ruses"	Michael Caffey	Emilie Small & Garn Stephens	December 19, 1982	8-B10
77	12	"Life, Death and Vinnie Duncan"	Michael Caffey	John Whelpley	January 2, 1983	8-B12
78	13	"Baby on the Line"	Bernard McEveety	Elaine Newman	January 9, 1983	8-B11
79	14	"It Only Hurts When I Love"	Bernard McEveety	Deborah Zoe Dawson & Victoria Johns	January 16, 1983	8-B13
80	15	"Hear Today, Gone Tomorrow"	Vincent Sherman	Jeff Stuart	January 23, 1983	8-B14
81	16	"Forget Me Not"	Leo Penn	John Whelpley	January 30, 1983	8-B16
82	17	"The Spy Who Bugged Me"	Michael Caffey	J. Miyoko Hensley & Steven Hensley	February 13, 1983	8-B15
83	18	"Pasts Imperfect"	Gregory Harrison	Story by : Robert Bielak; Teleplay by : Deborah Zoe Dawson & Victoria Johns & Jeff Stuart and Robert Bielak	February 20, 1983	8-B17
84	19	"Primetime"	Bernard McEveety	Nancy Bond & Phyllis Wapner	March 13, 1983	8-B18
85	20	"Blue Genes"	Earl Bellamy	Deborah Gilliand & Robert Sonntag	March 20, 1983	8-B19
86	21	"Friends in High Places"	Bernard McEveety	Deborah Zoe Dawson & Victoria Johns	March 27, 1983	8-B20
87	22	"South Side Story"	Earl Bellamy	Jeff Stuart	April 3, 1983	8-B21

=== Season 5 (1983–84) ===
No. overall	No. in season	Title	Directed by	Written by	Original release date	Prod. code
88	1	"I Only Have Ice for You"	Charles Siebert	John Whelpley	October 2, 1983	8-B22
89	2	"...And for Loyal and Devoted Service"	Michael Caffey	Phyllis Wapner & Nancy Bond	October 9, 1983	2-F02
90	3	"All About Everett"	Michael Caffey	Jeff Stuart	October 16, 1983	2-F04
91	4	"May Divorce Be with You"	Earl Bellamy	Deborah Zoe Dawson & Victoria Johns	October 23, 1983	2-F03
92	5	"What a Difference a Day Makes"	Earl Bellamy	Deborah Gilliland & Robert Sonntag	October 30, 1983	2-F01
93	6	"The Final Cut"	Michael Caffey	John Whelpley	November 6, 1983	2-F06
94	7	"Old Man Liver"	Earl Bellamy	Stewart Moss	November 13, 1983	2-F05
95	8	"The Agony of D'Feet"	Michael Caffey	Story by : Robert Bielak; Teleplay by : Robert Bielak and John Whelpley and Don Brinkley	November 20, 1983	2-F08
96	9	"Mother Load"	Vincent Sherman	Oliver Clark	November 27, 1983	2-F09
97	10	"Fat Chance"	Susan Oliver	Barry Pollack	December 4, 1983	2-F07
98	11	"Supernurse"	Michael Caffey	Jeff Stuart	December 11, 1983	2-F10
99	12	"Special Delivery"	Earl Bellamy	Story by : Kay Bender; Teleplay by : John Whelpley	January 1, 1984	2-F11
100	13	"Play Your Hunch"	Michael Caffey	Maxine Herman	January 8, 1984	2-F12
101	14	"A Little Knife Music"	Earl Bellamy	John Whelpley	January 15, 1984	2-F13
102	15	"Where There's a Will"	Earl Bellamy	Bruce Howard	January 29, 1984	2-F15
103	16	"Send in the Clowns"	Michael O'Herlihy	Deborah Zoe Dawson & Victoria Johns	February 12, 1984	2-F14
104	17	"This Gland is Your Gland"	Earl Bellamy	J. Miyoko Hensley & Steven Hensley	March 4, 1984	2-F17
105	18	"The Fred Connection"	Leo Penn	Jim Mulligan	March 11, 1984	2-F18
106	19	"The Jackpot Pays Off"	Ivan Dixon	Story by : Paul Robinson Hunter; Teleplay by : Paul Robinson Hunter & Jeff Stuart	March 18, 1984	2-F16
107	20	"I Do, I Don't"	Michael Caffey	John Whelpley	March 25, 1984	2-F19
108	21	"It's About Time"	Leo Penn	Barry Pollack	April 1, 1984	2-F20
109	22	"Aunt Mildred is Watching You"	Gregory Harrison	Jeff Stuart	May 6, 1984	2-F21

=== Season 6 (1984–85) ===
No. overall	No. in season	Title	Directed by	Written by	Original release date	Prod. code
110	1	"A Change of Heart"	Michael Caffey	Barry Pollack	September 30, 1984	3-L01
111	2	"My Son, the Doctor"	Leo Penn	Deborah Zoe Dawson & Victoria Johns	October 14, 1984	3-L02
112	3	"Moonlighting Becomes You"	Charles Siebert	Deborah Zoe Dawson & Victoria Johns	October 21, 1984	2-F22
113	4	"Eternally Yours"	Earl Bellamy	Holly Durham & Greg Thorneycroft	October 28, 1984	3-L05
114	5	"School Nurse"	Michael Caffey	Pamela Douglas	November 4, 1984	3-L04
115	6	"Of Cats, Crushes and Creeps"	Michael Caffey	Robert M. Young	November 18, 1984	3-L06
116	7	"A Fall to Grace"	Michael Caffey	Kimmer Ringwald	November 25, 1984	3-L08
117	8	"Promises, Promises"	Earl Bellamy	Story by : Clyde Phillips & John Whelpley; Teleplay by : John Whelpley	December 9, 1984	3-L07
118	9	"Dark Side of the Loon"	Gregory Harrison	John Whelpley	December 16, 1984	3-L09
119	10	"Double Bubble"	Michael Caffey	Story by : Jon Breakfield; Teleplay by : Nancy Bond & Jon Breakfield	December 30, 1984	3-L10
120	11	"Long Ago and Far Away"	Earl Bellamy	Emilie R. Small & Garn Stephens	January 6, 1985	3-L11
121	12	"Muddle of the Knight"	Lorraine Senna	Nancy Bond	January 13, 1985	3-L12
122	13	"Buckaroo Bob Rides Again"	Bob Sweeney	Kimmer Ringwald	January 20, 1985	3-L03
123	14	"Love Thy Neighbor"	Charles Siebert	John Whelpley	February 3, 1985	3-L13
124	15	"So Little, Gone"	Michael Caffey	Kimmer Ringwald	February 17, 1985	3-L15
125	16	"Bad Breaks"	Walter Grauman	Story by : Barry Pollack; Teleplay by : Barry Pollack & John Whelpley	February 24, 1985	3-L16
126	17	"High Time"	Earl Bellamy	Holly Durham & Greg Thorneycroft and Nancy Bond & Kimmer Ringwald	March 3, 1985	3-L14
127	18	"The Unholy Ghost"	Leo Penn	Story by : Robert Malcolm Young; Teleplay by : Robert Malcolm Young & Nancy Bond	March 10, 1985	3-L17
128	19	"A False Start"	Gregory Harrison	Deborah Gilliland & Robert Sonntag	March 17, 1985	3-L18
129	20	"In the Eyes of the Beholder"	Arthur Allan Seidelman	Barry Pollack	March 24, 1985	3-L19
130	21	"All the King's Men" "All the King's Horses..."	Charles Siebert	Gene O'Neill & Noreen Tobin	March 31, 1985	3-L20
131	22	"Go for Broker"	Gregory Harrison	Carl Sautter	April 21, 1985	3-L21
132	23	"All of Me"	Michael Caffey	Story by : Dawn Tarnofsky; Teleplay by : Nancy Bond	May 5, 1985	3-L22

=== Season 7 (1985–86) ===
No. overall	No. in season	Title	Directed by	Written by	Original release date	Prod. code
133	1	"Game of Hearts: Part 1"	Michael Caffey	John Whelpley	October 6, 1985	4-J01
134	2	"Game of Hearts: Part 2"	Michael Caffey	Don Brinkley & Frank Glicksman	October 13, 1985	4-J02
135	3	"Hot Shot"	Michael Caffey	Deborah Zoe Dawson & Victoria Johns	October 20, 1985	4-J04
136	4	"Just Around the Corner"	Leo Penn	Barry Pollack	October 27, 1985	4-J05
137	5	"Friends and Lovers"	Leo Penn	Carl Sautter & Carol Frank	November 3, 1985	4-J07
138	6	"The Wunderkind"	Leo Penn	Kimmer Ringwald	November 10, 1985	4-J03
139	7	"A Wheel Within a Wheel"	Michael Caffey	George O'Neill & Noreen Tobin	December 1, 1985	4-J06
140	8	"The Second Best Man"	Joseph Pevney	Kimmer Ringwald	December 15, 1985	4-J08
141	9	"Billboard Barney"	Howard Morris	Robert M. Young (s/t); Kimmer Ringwald (s)	December 29, 1985	4-J10
142	10	"Going, Going, Gonzo"	Victor Lobi	John Whelpley	January 5, 1986	4-J11
143	11	"Heart and Seoul"	Charles Siebert	Nancy Bond (t) & John Breckfield (s/t) & Robert C. Thompson (s/t)	January 28, 1986	4-J09
144	12	"Life, Death and Dr. Christmas"	Howard Morris	Kimmer Ringwald	February 18, 1986	4-J12
145	13	"Judgment Day"	Michael Caffey	John Whelpley	March 4, 1986	4-J15
146	14	"Fall of the Wild"	Victor Lobi	Nancy Bond (t) & Deborah Zoe Dawson (s) & Victoria Johns (s) & Kimmer Ringwald (t) & John Whelpley (t)	March 11, 1986	4-J14
147	15	"The Curmudgeon"	Douglas E. Wise	Kimmer Ringwald	March 18, 1986	4-J18
148	16	"Self-Diagnosis"	Michael Caffey	Lawrence Levy (s/t) & Don Brinkley (t)	August 14, 1986	4-J17
149	17	"Research and Destroy"	Michael Caffey	Nancy Bond (t) & Deborah Zoe Dawson (s) & Victoria Johns (s) & Kimmer Ringwald (s) & John Whelpley (t)	August 21, 1986	4-J13
150	18	"Strange Bedfellows"	Charles Siebert	Barry Pollack	August 28, 1986	4-J19
151	19	"The Elusive Butterfly"	Charles S. Dubin	Gene O'Neill & Noreen Tobin	September 4, 1986	4-J16
