= The Interns (TV series) =

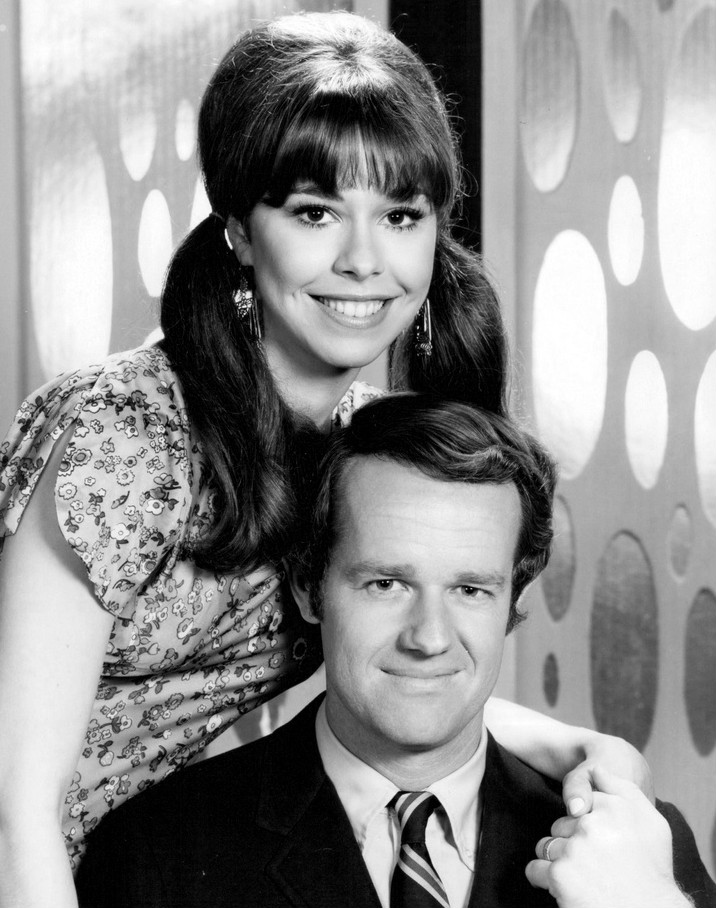
- Elaine Giftos and Mike Farrell as Bobbe and Sam Marsh.
- Genre: Medical drama
- Written by: William Blinn; Don Brinkley; Howard Dimsdale; Charles Larson; Jack Miller
- Directed by: Marvin J. Chomsky; Allen Reisner; David Lowell Rich
- Starring: Broderick Crawford; Mike Farrell; Christopher Stone; Stephen Brooks; Elaine Giftos; Sandra Smith
- Composer: Shorty Rogers
- Country of origin: United States
- Original language: English
- No. of seasons: 1
- No. of episodes: 24

Production
- Executive producer: Bob Claver
- Producer: Charles Larson
- Running time: 60 mins.
- Production company: Screen Gems

Original release
- Network: CBS
- Release: September 18, 1970 – September 10, 1971

The Interns is an American medical drama series that aired on CBS from 1970 to 1971. It was based on the 1962 film The Interns and the 1964 sequel The New Interns.

== Overview ==
The stories centered on the activities of Dr. Peter Goldstone (Broderick Crawford) and five medical interns at New North Hospital in Los Angeles. The series dealt with issues of the day including the racism faced by one of the African American interns. The other interns consisted of a newlywed, two bachelors, and a woman.

== Cast ==
Actor	Role
Broderick Crawford	Dr. Peter Goldstone
Mike Farrell	Dr. Sam Marsh
Skip Homeier	Dr. Hugh Jacoby
Christopher Stone	Dr. Pooch Hardin
Stephen Brooks	Dr. Greg Pettit
Hal Frederick	Dr. Cal Barrin
Elaine Giftos	Bobbe Marsh
Sandra Smith	Dr. Lydia Thorpe
Simon Scott	Jim

== Episodes ==
No.	Title	Directed by	Written by	Original release date
1	"The Quality of Mercy"	Bob Claver	William Blinn	September 18, 1970
A monk who has been cloistered for 40 years is treated for a tumor, while a stripper suffers from a bone spur and a distraught wife pleads for the mercy killing of her dying husband. Bert Convy and Sherry Jackson guest star.
2	"Death Wish"	Allen Reisner	William Blinn	September 25, 1970
Dr. Hardin refuses to believe warnings that a pretty girl patient is in fact a desperate heroin addict.
3	"Some Things Don't Change"	William Hale	Story by : Larry Brody; Charles E. Israel; Teleplay by : Larry Brody	October 2, 1970
A young man, fearful of passing on an inherited brain disease, demands that his girlfriend have an abortion. Christopher Connelly guest stars.
4	"An Afternoon in the Fall"	Daniel Petrie	Mark Rodgers	October 9, 1970
A would-be killer (William Devane) threatens to complete his job against the victim, who is being treated at New North Hospital. Albert Salmi and Brooke Bundy also star.
5	"Eyes of the Beholder"	Ralph Senensky	Skip Webster	October 16, 1970
A recently blinded pickpocket joins a group therapy program in order to help blind persons. Milt Kamen and Meg Foster guest star.
6	"Miss Knock-a-Bout"	Allen Reisner	William Blinn	October 23, 1970
A female clown (Bridget Hanley) files a $1 million lawsuit after she claims she has been permanently damaged by a woman-hating surgeon.
7	"The Price of Life"	Michael O'Herlihy	Jack Miller	October 30, 1970
Enraged when he is refused life-saving treatment because no kidney dialysis machine is available, a young man tries to steal the costly equipment. Pete Duel guest stars.
8	"The Oath"	Jerry Thorpe	Arthur Dales	November 6, 1970
Dr. Marsh (Mike Farrell) finds it difficult to practice professional detachment when he realizes that the man he is treating is the assailant who had beaten his wife (Elaine Giftos). Mills Watson and Malachi Throne guest star.
9	"Act of God"	Don McDougall	Charles Larson	November 20, 1970
After an argument with Dr. Goldstone (Broderick Crawford) over a dying child, Dr. Pettit (Stephen Brooks) is involved in an auto accident that leaves him stranded in rough country with two critically injured young people. Lane Bradbury and Charles Aidman guest star.
10	"Mondays Can Be Fatal"	Marvin J. Chomsky	Don Brinkley	November 27, 1970
Dr. Harden (Christopher Stone) is suspected of murdering the hostess at a party, but he can't remember anything because he was served spiked punch. Ron Rifkin and Sabrina Scharf guest star.
11	"The Fever"	Allen Reisner	Story by : Alan Gadney; Teleplay by : Charles Larson	December 4, 1970
Fear of an epidemic sweeps the city after Dr. Marsh is stricken with bubonic plague. Viveca Lindfors and Eduard Franz guest star.
12	"The Prisoners"	David Lowell Rich	Charles Larson	December 11, 1970
Dr. Pettit (Stephen Brooks) gets in the middle of a prison riot led by a badly-scarred killer, while Dr. Thorpe (Sandra Smith) deals with a mute child whose inability to speak has no physical diagnosis. Warner Anderson and Kaz Garas guest star.
13	"Dancy"	Leo Penn	Barry Oringer	December 18, 1970
The death of a 14-year-old from a drug overdose overwhelms Dr. Marsh, forcing him to investigate the world of drug abuse. John Randolph and Georg Stanford Brown guest star.
14	"Changes"	Allen Reisner	Inez C. Boyd; Marshall D. Wilkerson	January 1, 1971
A bomb explodes at New North Hospital on the eve of a threatened strike, injuring Dr. Barrin (Hal Frederick) and forcing Dr. Goldstone to order evacuation of all patients who can be moved. Robert Lansing and Billy Dee Williams guest star.
15	"The Secret"	Jud Taylor	Samuel Roeca	January 22, 1971
A playboy (Martin Sheen) takes the blame for a fatal hit-and-run auto accident in order to protect his guilty brother, a senatorial candidate.
16	"Tasha"	Michael Caffey	Arthur Dales	January 29, 1971
Dr. Pooch Hardin sees a long term mental patient, Tasha (Signe Hasso), who refuses to speak. The more he delves into the case the more Pooch believes she may be faking.
17	"Metamorphosis"	Allen Reisner	Jack Miller	February 5, 1971
A librarian (Lois Nettleton) with a dual personality exhibits a crush on Dr. Marsh (Mike Farrell).
18	"The Challenger"	Paul Stanley	Don Brinkley	February 12, 1971
After the world's foremost billiards player (Frank Gorshin) undergoes an emergency amputation of the hand, his wife (Sheree North) files a lawsuit against both Dr. Pettit and the hospital.
19	"Casualty"	Richard Donner	Story by : Barbara Torgan; William Blinn; Teleplay by : William Blinn	February 19, 1971
An author astonishes everyone with her callous attitude after she learns that her brother has been diagnosed with leukemia. Diana Hyland and John Davidson guest star.
20	"Heart Trouble"	Unknown	William Blinn	February 26, 1971
An executive becomes jealous when he believes that Dr. Marsh is giving his pregnant wife a bit too much attention. Peter Haskell and Meredith MacRae guest star.
21	"The Guardian"	Unknown	Unknown	March 5, 1971
The arrival of a famed heart specialist stirs resentment at the hospital when rumors surface that is to be the successor of the ailing Dr. Goldstone (Broderick Crawford). Lew Ayres and Shelley Fabares guest star.
22	"The Manly Art"	Unknown	Unknown	March 12, 1971
A veteran boxer (Ron O'Neal) stages a surprising comeback.
23	"Castle of the Lion"	Marvin J. Chomsky	Story by : Tina Pine; Les Pine; Teleplay by : William Blinn	March 19, 1971
An Italian mother (Pat Carroll) desperately tries to find a kidney donor in order to save the life of her critically ill daughter.
24	"The Choice"	David Lowell Rich	Story by : Stephen Karpf; Elinor Karpf; Teleplay by : Charles Larson; Stephen Karpf; Elinor Karpf	March 26, 1971
Just as Dr. Thorpe (Sandra Smith) undertakes a heavy workload at her inner city clinic, her fiance asks her to give up medicine.

== Reception ==
Most reviews were critical, citing the predictable and formulaic nature of the "new hip cast" of doctors. Clarence Petersen wrote in the Chicago Tribune:

[The Interns] is pretty much like all the other doctor shows except maybe a bit more relevant because the doctors are a bit more hip. They are dedicated after the fashion of Ben Casey, of course, but unlike Ben, they also smile and laugh. In one scene, moreover, they all run down the street, as if they were doing a Pepsi commercial or auditioning for The Mod Squad, but they aren’t. They are trying to catch a bearded orderly who has slipped poison to a dying patient who wanted to end it quickly.
