= Nakia (TV series) =

- Genre: Police drama
- Created by: Michael Butler; Christopher Trumbo
- Developed by: Sy Salkowitz
- Starring: Robert Forster
- Composer: Leonard Rosenman
- Country of origin: United States
- Original language: English
- No. of seasons: 1
- No. of episodes: 13 (and 1 pilot)

Production
- Executive producer: Charles Larson
- Running time: 60 minutes
- Production companies: David Gerber Productions; Columbia Pictures Television

Original release
- Network: ABC
- Release: September 21 – December 28, 1974

A promotional photo of Robert Forster as Deputy Nakia Parker in Nakia

Nakia is an American drama series starring Robert Forster as the title character, a Navajo Native American police officer in New Mexico. Forster previously played the title character in the detective show Banyon. Nakia aired from September 21 to December 28, 1974.

Nakia's pilot was the made-for-television movie Nakia, which was broadcast on April 17, 1974.

== Cast ==
- Robert Forster as Deputy Nakia Parker
- Arthur Kennedy as Sheriff Sam Jericho
- Gloria DeHaven as Irene James
- Taylor Lacher as Deputy Hubbel Martin
- John Tenorio, Jr. as Half Cub
- Victor Jory as Ben Redearth

== Synopsis ==
Nakia Parker is a full-blooded Navajo in his mid-30s who is a deputy sheriff in the fictional town of Concord in fictional Davis County in 1974 New Mexico. In the sheriff's department, he works for Sheriff Sam Jericho, as does fellow deputy sheriff Hubbel Martin and the office secretary, Irene James. Ben Redearth is a Native American friend of Nakia's, and Half Cub is Nakia's 12-year-old nephew.

Nakia is often torn between ancient tribal customs and the use of modern police methods. Rather than use a police car, he alternates between driving a pickup truck and riding a horse while investigating cases. Sometimes inscrutable and prone to voicing tribal proverbs, Nakia is deeply committed to protecting his fellow Native Americans from injustice, and at times this leads to opposition from his more narrow-minded white neighbors – including Sheriff Jericho.

== Production ==
Michael Butler and Christopher Trumbo created Nakia, and Charles Larson was its executive producer. Episode directors included Nicholas Colasanto, Alvin Ganzer, Leonard Horn, and Alexander Singer, and episode producers included Larson, David Gerber, Peter Katz, Ernest A. Losso, and George Sunga. Butler, Larson, and Trumbo all wrote for the show, as did Sy Salkowitz, Jim Byrnes, Mark Saha, Phyllis White, and Robert White.

Nakia, a rarity among American television series in its attempt to depict the challenges of modern-day Native Americans, was filmed largely on location in and around Albuquerque, New Mexico.

== Broadcast history ==
The pilot for the series aired on ABC as the made-for-television movie Nakia on April 17, 1974. Nakia premiered as a weekly ABC series on September 21, 1974. In addition to the pilot, thirteen episodes aired before the show, with low ratings in the face of tough competition in its time slot from CBS's The Carol Burnett Show, was cancelled after the broadcast of December 28, 1974. The show aired at 10:00 p.m. on Saturday throughout its run.

== Episodes ==
=== Television film (1974) ===
Title	Original release date
Nakia	April 17, 1974
Nakia is caught in the middle of a community dispute when the Concord city council decides to sell an historic mission to a housing developer and the tribe tries to save it. Linda Evans and George Nader guest-star.

=== Season 1 (1974) ===
No.	Title	Directed by	Written by	Original release date
1	"The Non-Person"	Unknown	Unknown	September 21, 1974
A dark-skinned young Native American man wearing squeaky shoes, George Two Horses, argues with a stereo store owner who refuses to extend him credit to buy a radio. Later that day, the store owner confronts a dark-skinned burglar wearing squeaky shoes who is trying to steal the same radio, and the burglar fatally injures him. When the police attempt to question Two Horses, he flees, and when he is captured he is found to have dried blood on his shirt. Despite the opposition of townspeople and the skepticism of Sheriff Jericho, Nakia believes that Two Horses is innocent and tries to help clear him of the murder charge. A Martinez guest-stars.
2	"The Quarry"	Lee Philips	Leonard Stadd & Arlene Stadd	September 28, 1974
Nakia investigates how a once kind and loving father became a murderous wild man.
3	"The Sand Trap"	Leonard Horn	Tim Kelly	October 5, 1974
Nakia investigates the murder of a country boy who married into high society, and his widow is the leading suspect. Jo Ann Harris and Mariana Hill guest-star.
4	"The Hostage"	Unknown	Unknown	October 12, 1974
A tough bank robber takes a young mentally disabled woman hostage, and an unlikely bond develops between them. David Huffman, Kay Lenz, Jeanne Stein and Emmett S. Robbins guest-star.
5	"No Place to Hide"	Nicholas Colasanto	Jim Byrnes	October 19, 1974
A new resident of Concord is being hunted by his former colleagues in organized crime. Gabe Dell, Ray Danton and Gwen Van Dam guest-star.
6	"A Beginning in the Wilderness"	Sutton Roley	Mort Fine	October 26, 1974
Nakia tries to save a kidnapped boy.
7	"The Driver"	Unknown	Unknown	November 2, 1974
Nakia is concerned that a naive young man is unwittingly becoming involved in criminal activities.
8	"The Moving Target"	Unknown	Unknown	November 9, 1974
Nakia fears that an old friend may be the prospective target of a sharpshooter's revenge.
9	"The Dream"	Alvin Ganzer	Phyllis White & Robert White	November 23, 1974
A student who is now the main suspect in a series of crimes plans to kill a Native American doctor who committed him to psychiatric treatment years earlier.
10	"Roots of Anger"	Unknown	Unknown	November 30, 1974
A fight breaks out in Jackie's, a local bar, and Nakia subdues a local troublemaker during the brawl by knocking him out. The man is found dead the next day, and Nakia is in danger of facing murder charges. Forced to clear his name, he investigates the man's death and finds that the man's teenaged brother murdered him after a disagreement. Guest star Lynda Carter made her acting debut in this episode. Pernell Roberts and Barbara Rhoades also guest-star.
11	"A Matter of Choice"	Unknown	Unknown	December 7, 1974
A deputy intensifies his crusade to arrest drug dealers after an informant disappears. Charles Aidman, Pat Carroll and Farley Granger guest-star.
12	"Pete"	Unknown	Unknown	December 21, 1974
Nakia ignores standard police procedures to deal with a couple on a robbery spree. Guest stars: Johnny Doran, George Maharis and Shirley Knight
13	"The Fire Dancer"	Unknown	Unknown	December 28, 1974
Ben Redearth insists on undergoing a Native American traditional cure after a bear claws him. Guest stars: Anthony Caruso and Burr Smidt
