= Sandra Smith (actress) =

American actress

- Born: Minneapolis, Minnesota, U.S.
- Occupation: Actress
- Years active: 1958–1975

Sandra Ann Smith is an American retired television actress.

== Life and career ==
Sandra Ann Smith was born in Minneapolis, Minnesota.

She had a memorable role as the tormented but cunning and lethal Dr. Janice Lester, who nearly succeeds in permanently supplanting Captain Kirk in the episode "Turnabout Intruder", the 24th and final episode of the third season of the American science-fiction television series Star Trek. Written by Arthur H. Singer (based on a story by Gene Roddenberry) and directed by Herb Wallerstein, it was first broadcast on June 3, 1969.

Smith remains, aside from William Shatner, the only other performer ever to play an incarnation of Captain James T. Kirk in any Star Trek television episode or film from the inception of the franchise until the 2009 film, Star Trek. She was also a member of the cast of The Interns.

== Partial television filmography ==
- Naked City (1958)
- Our Private World (4 episodes; 1965)
- The Virginian (1967)
- Mannix (1967)
- Ironside (1967)
- The Wild Wild West (1968) S3 E18 as Nadine Conover in "The Night of the Viper"
- The Big Valley (2 episodes; 1967, 1968)
- Bonanza (2 episodes; 1968, 1969)
- The Bold Ones (1969)
- Star Trek: The Original Series (1969) – Janice Lester in S3:E24, "Turnabout Intruder"
- The Interns (1970–71) 24 episodes
- Columbo, "The Greenhouse Jungle" (1972)
- Owen Marshall, Counselor at Law (1972)
- Hawaii Five-O (2 episodes; 1968, 1973)
- Gunsmoke (3 episodes; 1968 twice, 1972)
- The F.B.I. (2 episodes; 1970, 1973)
- The Rockford Files (1975)
