= The Long, Hot Summer (TV series) =

American drama (1965–66)

- Genre: Drama
- Created by: Dean Riesner
- Opening theme: "The Long Hot Summer" performed by Jimmie Rodgers
- Composer: Leith Stevens
- Country of origin: United States
- Original language: English
- No. of seasons: 1
- No. of episodes: 26

Production
- Producer: Frank Glicksman
- Running time: 45 mins. (approx)
- Production company: 20th Century Fox Television

Original release
- Network: ABC
- Release: September 16, 1965 – April 13, 1966

The Long, Hot Summer is an American drama series from 20th Century Fox Television that was broadcast on ABC-TV for one season from 1965–1966. It was aired in the UK on ITV.

== Synopsis ==
The series is set in the Deep South community of Frenchman's Bend, Mississippi, which is dominated and owned by the town's wealthy and powerful (and deceitful) bank owner "Boss" Will Varner. A widower with two grown children, the unscrupulous Varner runs the town and its citizens with an iron fist, and nobody dares to question him. He and his family live in the largest mansion in Frenchman's Bend. However, problems arise when Ben Quick, a young man whose father Varner destroyed some years prior, returns to town to reclaim his family's farm and challenge Varner's absolute authority over the town and its people.

Supporting characters include Jody Varner, Will's weak-willed but more honest son, and Clara, Will's sensible older daughter and lady of the house (in lieu of her late mother). To her father's dismay, she and Ben fall in love. Other characters include the town's hotel owner Minnie Littlejohn, who is also Will's mistress, and Eula Johnson, a 17-year-old girl who becomes a central point in Jody's life after he picks her up during a rainstorm. In the 1958 film, Eula and Jody were married, but in the television series they are merely friends. Also seen in recurring roles are Andrew, the Varner family's butler and chauffeur, Sheriff Harve Anders, the local sheriff for the county in which Frenchman's Bend is located, and Dr. Aaron Clark, the Varner family's physician.

== Cast ==
=== Main ===
- Edmond O'Brien (eps. 1–13) and Dan O'Herlihy (eps. 15–26) as "Boss" Will Varner
- Nancy Malone as Clara Varner
- Roy Thinnes as Ben Quick
- Lana Wood as Eula Johnson (eps. 3+)
- Paul Geary (eps. 1–23) and Tom Lowell (eps. 24–26) as Jody Varner
- Ruth Roman as Minnie Littlejohn

=== Guest cast ===
- Karen Steele as Willow Sterne (eps. 4–5)
- Celeste Holm as Libby Rankin (ep. 15)
- Gary Lockwood as Danny Hamil (ep. 17)
- Ralph Meeker as Jess Corbett (ep. 21)
- Ricardo Montalban as Brice Ferguson (ep. 26)

== Production ==
=== Development ===
Created by Dean Riesner, The Long, Hot Summer was based on the novel The Hamlet by William Faulkner, the short story "Barn Burning", and the 1958 film. The show retained the movie's theme song, "The Long, Hot Summer," written by Sammy Cahn and Alex North, and Jimmie Rodgers sang it for the series as he did for the film.

=== Broadcast ===
The Long, Hot Summer was scheduled on Thursdays at 10 p.m. EST opposite CBS's Thursday Night Movie and NBC's long-running variety series The Dean Martin Show. The series was canceled after twenty-six episodes, with the last original episode aired on April 13, 1966.

=== Casting ===
In January 1966, series star Edmond O'Brien left the series after a disagreement with the producers (the disagreement was about making Ben Quick the main focus of the show instead of the Varners) and was replaced by Dan O'Herlihy. O'Herlihy played the role of Will Varner for the rest of the series's run.

== Episodes ==
No.	Title	Directed by	Written by	Original release date	Viewers (millions)
1	"The Homecoming"	Ralph Senensky	Dean Riesner	September 16, 1965	14.5
2	"A Time for Living"	Robert Gist	Story by : Donald S. Sanford; Teleplay by : Donald S. Sanford & Dean Reisner	September 23, 1965	15.5
3	"A Stranger to the House"	Vincent Sherman	Story by : Alfred Brenner; Teleplay by : Alfred Brenner & Dean Reisner	September 30, 1965	14.6
4	"The Twisted Image – Part 1"	Robert Gist	Anthony Lawrence	October 7, 1965	14.3
5	"The Twisted Image – Part 2"	Mark Rydell	Anthony Lawrence	October 14, 1965	13.0
6	"Home is a Nameless Place"	Richard Sarafian	William Bast	October 21, 1965	14.5
7	"No Hiding Place"	Vincent Sherman	Story by : Jerome Ross; Teleplay by : John Bloch	October 28, 1965	15.0
8	"Run, Hero, Run"	James B. Clark	Mark Rodgers	November 4, 1965	13.9
9	"The Desperate Innocent"	Alex March	Oliver Crawford	November 11, 1965	14.6
10	"Bitter Harvest"	Vincent Sherman	Al C. Ward	November 18, 1965	16.1
11	"Hunter to the Wind"	Alex March	Franklin Barton	December 2, 1965	14.5
12	"Nor Hell a Fury"	Vincent Sherman	Oscar Millard	December 9, 1965	13.5
13	"The Return of the Quicks"	Don Richardson	James Gunn	December 16, 1965	13.4
14	"Track the Man Down"	Vincent Sherman	Oliver Crawford	December 30, 1965	13.0
15	"Face of Fear"	Lewis Allen	Story by : Bernard Schoenfeld; Teleplay by : Jack Turley	January 6, 1966	14.6
16	"Evil Angel"	Robert Stevens	Story by : Alfred Brenner & Robert J. Shaw; Teleplay by : Robert J. Shaw	January 13, 1966	14.3
17	"Day of Thunder"	Don Richardson	Jack Turley	January 19, 1966	13.1
18	"The Warning"	Marc Daniels	Sy Salkowitz	January 26, 1966	14.2
19	"The Intruders"	John Peyser	Jerome Ross	February 2, 1966	14.1
20	"From This Day Forward"	Vincent Sherman	Robert J. Shaw	February 9, 1966	13.9
21	"A Time to Die"	Alex March	Michael Zagor	February 16, 1966	13.0
22	"Reunion—Italian Style"	Marc Daniels	Story by : Mark Rodgers & Robert J. Shaw; Teleplay by : Robert J. Shaw	February 23, 1966	15.2
23	"Blaze of Glory"	Vincent Sherman	Story by : William Bast & Robert J. Shaw; Teleplay by : Robert J. Shaw	March 2, 1966	14.5
24	"Crisis"	Mark Rydell	Anthony Lawrence	March 9, 1966	14.2
25	"Carlotta, Come Home"	Mark Rydell	Robert J. Shaw	March 30, 1966	14.3
26	"Man with Two Faces"	Alex March	Jack Turley	April 13, 1966	unknown
