= Garn Stephens =

American actress (1944–2023)

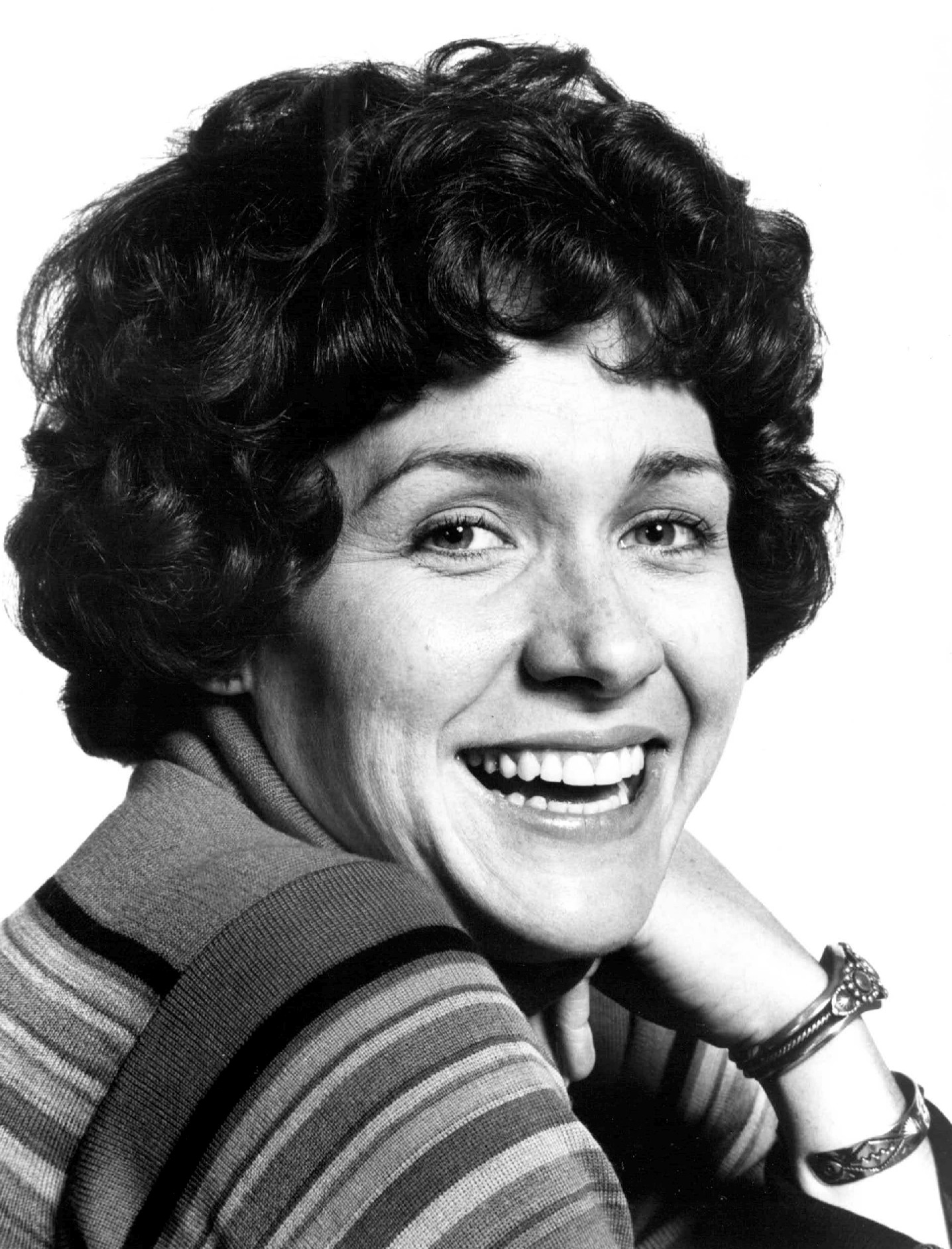
- Stephens in 1976
- Born: Garn Gaynell Stephens; November 7, 1944; Tulsa, Oklahoma, U.S.
- Died: April 2, 2023 (aged 78); Los Angeles, California, U.S.
- Occupation(s): Actress, writer
- Years active: 1971–1993
- Spouse: Tom Atkins (divorced)
- Partner: Stuart Niemi
- Children: 1

Garn Gaynell Stephens (November 7, 1944 – April 2, 2023) was an American film, television, stage, and musical theatre actress, and, later, a screenwriter. She was known for her roles in the television series Phyllis and the 1982 horror film Halloween III: Season of the Witch.

== Career ==
Stephens began her career on stage as a theatre actress. She performed as Estelle in the original stage play Father's Day in 1971 and played the original character Jan in the Broadway production of Grease the following year.

Throughout her 20-year career, Stephens made many television guest appearances, beginning in 1975 with an appearance on the series Wide World Mystery and a guest role on CBS sitcom All in the Family. The following year, Stephens received a leading role on the Golden Globe-winning television sitcom Phyllis with Cloris Leachman, the second spin-off from The Mary Tyler Moore Show. From the late seventies until the early nineties, Stephens appeared in several top-rated television series, including Charlie's Angels, Family Ties, Falcon Crest, and Quantum Leap.

During her career, Stephens starred in three feature films. In 1975, she appeared in The Sunshine Boys with Walter Matthau and George Burns, as well as Jake's M.O. She is best known for her role as Marge Guttman in the 1982 horror film Halloween III: Season of the Witch, which also starred her then-husband Tom Atkins. In 2003, she appeared at the Halloween: 25 Years of Terror convention, where she discussed how she received the role. Stephens had been friends with John Carpenter's then-wife Adrienne Barbeau, with whom she had worked on Grease. Stephens met Carpenter when she and Atkins were invited to see a premiere of Halloween in 1978 with Carpenter and Barbeau. Carpenter later offered her a role in Halloween III.

Stephens also wrote for television, including a 1983 episode of the medical drama series St. Elsewhere, for which she received an Emmy Award nomination. Her writing credits also include Trapper John, M.D., Hotel, and Trial by Jury.

Stephens also penned a number of crime-mystery stories.

== Personal life and death ==
Stephens was born in Tulsa, Oklahoma. Stephens was at one time married to actor Tom Atkins. She lived with musician Stuart Niemi, with whom she had one child, Spencer Baird Niemi.

Stephens died on April 2, 2023, at the age of 78.

== Filmography ==
Year	Title	Role	Notes
1975	Wide World Mystery	Waitress	Episode: "Please Call It Murder"
1975	The Sunshine Boys	Eddie	
1975	All in the Family	Dotty	Episode: "Gloria is Nervous"
1976–1977	Phyllis	Harriet Hastings	Leading role; 24 episodes
1978	Charlie's Angels	Elizabeth Mary 'Pokey' Jefferson	Episode: "Angels in the Backfield"
1978	Barney Miller	Susan Schuman-Edwards	Episode: "Evaluation"
1979	Blind Ambition	Carol	Television mini-series
1980	Portrait of a Rebel: The Remarkable Mrs. Sanger	Mollie	Television film
1980	The Seduction of Miss Leona	June Setzer	Television film
1982	Halloween III: Season of the Witch	Marge Guttman	
1983	Princess Daisy	Candice Bloom	Television film
1984	Family Ties	Elizabeth Davidson	Episode: "Baby Boy Doe"
1984	Children in the Crossfire	Doctor	Television film
1986	Foley Square	Mrs. Sullivan	Episode: "Kid Stuff"
1987	Jake's M.O.	Liz Reardon	
1988	Buck James	Amy Ferguson	Episode: "Heal Thyself"
1988	Killer Instinct	Claire	Television film
1989	Have Faith	Edith Crepps	Episode: "Letters from Home"
1990	Family of Spies	Mary	Television film
1990	Falcon Crest	Ellen	Episode: "Finding Lauren"
1992	Something to Live for: The Alison Gertz Story	Gwen	Television film
1993	Quantum Leap	Gladys	Episode: "Memphis Melody"

Writer

Year	Title	Notes
1983	St. Elsewhere	Episode: "Newheart" — Nominated: Emmy Award for Outstanding Writing in a Drama Series shared with John Masius, Tom Fontana and Emilie R. Small
1982–1985	Trapper John, M.D.	Episodes: "Russians and Ruses", "Long Ago and Far Away"
1986	Hotel	Episode: "Double Jeopardy"
1991	Trial by Jury	Episode: "The Case of the Venal Veteran"
