= Don Brinkley =

American screenwriter

- Born: March 9, 1921; The Bronx, New York, U.S.
- Died: July 14, 2012 (aged 91); Sag Harbor, New York, U.S.
- Occupations: Writer, director, producer
- Years active: 1951–1988
- Children: 2, including Christie

Donald Alan Brinkley (March 9, 1921 – July 14, 2012) was an American television writer, director and producer. He wrote for many television shows in a career that spanned over 55 years. He is most notable for the shows Medical Center and Trapper John, M.D.. He also wrote a play and a novel, "A Lively Form of Death". Brinkley was honored by the Museum of Broadcasting both in Los Angeles and New York City for his career.

== Career ==
After World War II Brinkley worked in Chicago as a staff writer at WGN Radio and as a Chief Writer at CBS Radio.

In 1950 he moved to Southern California where he began a career as a television scenarist, writing over 400 teleplays for such shows as The Untouchables, The Fugitive, Have Gun, Will Travel, Kraft Suspense Theatre, The F.B.I., The Virginian, Ben Casey, Bat Masterson, The Man From U.N.C.L.E., Rawhide, Ironside, The Name of the Game and many others.

After serving as producer on the Executive Suite series, Brinkley wrote and produced a number of television pilots, one of which was Trapper John, M.D.. The series ran for seven years on CBS and accumulated many high ratings and awards for its explorations of such controversial issues as gay rights, women's rights, euthanasia, nuclear disarmament, the right to die and animal research. As one of the first series on US prime time television to deal with the AIDS problem, Trapper John, M.D. was awarded a citation of excellence by the city of Los Angeles. With Brinkley as executive producer, the show was also lauded for employing female writers and directors and for hiring disabled actors.

Don and Frank Glicksman, his co-creator and partner on Trapper John, M.D. also teamed up for the highly successful series, Medical Center, which Brinkley produced. Over the series' seven-year span, he also wrote 45 original episodes. One of them was directly responsible for strengthening the California laws regarding discrimination against cancer patients. Because of its social and political impact, that particular episode was cited by the California Legislature and awarded a certificate of merit by the American Cancer Society. Another of Brinkley's Medical Center scripts was chosen "Best Dramatic Television Show" at the Monte Carlo Film Festival.

In 1996 he published a thriller novel called A Lively Form of Death. In 1998 he wrote Prisoner of Justice (The Trials of Doctor Mudd), a drama in two acts.

In July 1988 the Museum of Broadcasting in New York set aside two nights to honor Don Brinkley with a retrospective of his career in television. In his speech to the museum's audience, Don stated that after almost fifty years as a writer/producer, "I've already become what I'm going to be".

== Early life ==
Don Brinkley grew up in New York City. While still in high school and in his collegiate years at Hofstra University, he began writing and selling radio scripts to the major networks. During World War II, he served as a medic in the US Army.

== Family ==
Don married Marjorie M. Bowling and legally adopted her children, including Christie. The day after Don died, Marjorie had a stroke and heart attack, dying only seven weeks later.

== Filmography ==
=== Films ===
Year	Film	Credit	Notes
1959	Beach Patrol	Writer	
1982	Family In Blue	Writer	
1988	Divided We Stand	Writer, Producer	

=== Television ===
Year	TV Series	Credit	Notes
1951	Dick Tracy	Writer	1 Episode
1952	The Cisco Kid	Writer	1 Episode
1953	The Web	Writer	1 Episode
1953	I Led 3 Lives	Writer	1 Episode
1955-57	Highway Patrol	Writer, Director	
1956-57	West Point	Writer	11 Episodes
1957	Dr. Christian	Writer	1 Episode
1957	Panic!	Writer	1 Episode
1957	The Web	Writer	3 Episodes
1957-58	Have Gun – Will Travel	Writer	3 Episodes
1957-58	Boots And Saddles	Writer	2 Episodes
1958	Target	Writer	1 Episode
1958	Perry Mason	Writer	1 Episode
1958	Westinghouse Desilu Playhouse	Writer	1 Episode
1958-60	Wanted: Dead or Alive	Writer	6 Episodes
1958-60	Tombstone Territory	Writer	2 Episodes
1958-61	Bat Masterson	Writer	14 Episodes
1959	The Rough Riders	Writer	1 Episode
1959	Trackdown	Writer	2 Episodes
1959	The Man and The Challenge	Writer	1 Episode
1959	Bold Venture	Writer	1 Episode
1959-60	Richard Diamond, Private Detective	Writer	3 Episodes
1960	Stagecoach West	Writer	1 Episode
1960	This Man Dawson	Writer	1 Episode
1960-61	Michael Shayne	Writer	6 Episodes
1961	Target: The Corruptors!	Writer	1 Episode
1961	King of Diamonds	Writer	1 Episode
1962	The Detectives	Writer	1 Episode
1962	The New Breed	Writer	2 Episodes
1962-63	Ben Casey	Writer	3 Episodes
1963	I'm Dickens, He's Fenster	Associate Producer	1 Episode
1963	The Untouchables	Writer	1 Episode
1963	Redigo	Writer	1 Episode
1963	Ripcord	Writer	1 Episode
1963-64	Arrest and Trial	Writer	3 Episodes
1964	Rawhide	Writer	1 Episode
1964	Voyage to the Bottom Of the Sea	Writer	2 Episodes
1965	Kraft Suspense Theatre	Writer	3 Episodes
1965	Convoy	Writer	1 Episode
1965-66	The Fugitive	Writer	5 Episodes
1965-66	The Virginian	Writer	2 Episodes
1965-71	The F.B.I.	Writer	11 Episodes
1966	Tarzan	Writer, Co-Producer	6 Episodes
1967	The Man from U.N.C.L.E.	Writer	1 Episode
1967	The Rat Patrol	Writer	2 Episodes
1967	Cowboy in Africa	Writer	1 Episode
1967-68	Ironside	Writer	2 Episodes
1967-68	The Invaders	Writer	4 Episodes
1967-68	The Felony Squad	Writer	5 Episodes
1968-69	Lancer	Writer	2 Episodes
1969	The Outcasts	Writer	1 Episode
1969	Strange Report	Writer	2 Episodes
1969-76	Medical Center	Writer, Producer, Story Consultant	Multiple Episodes
1970	Mannix	Writer	2 Episodes
1970	The Name of the Game	Writer	1 Episode
1970-71	The Interns	Writer	2 Episodes
1976	Executive Suite	Writer, Producer	4 Episodes
1979-86	Trapper John, M.D.	Writer, Producer, Executive Producer	Multiple Episodes
