= Medical Center (TV series) =

American medical drama television series

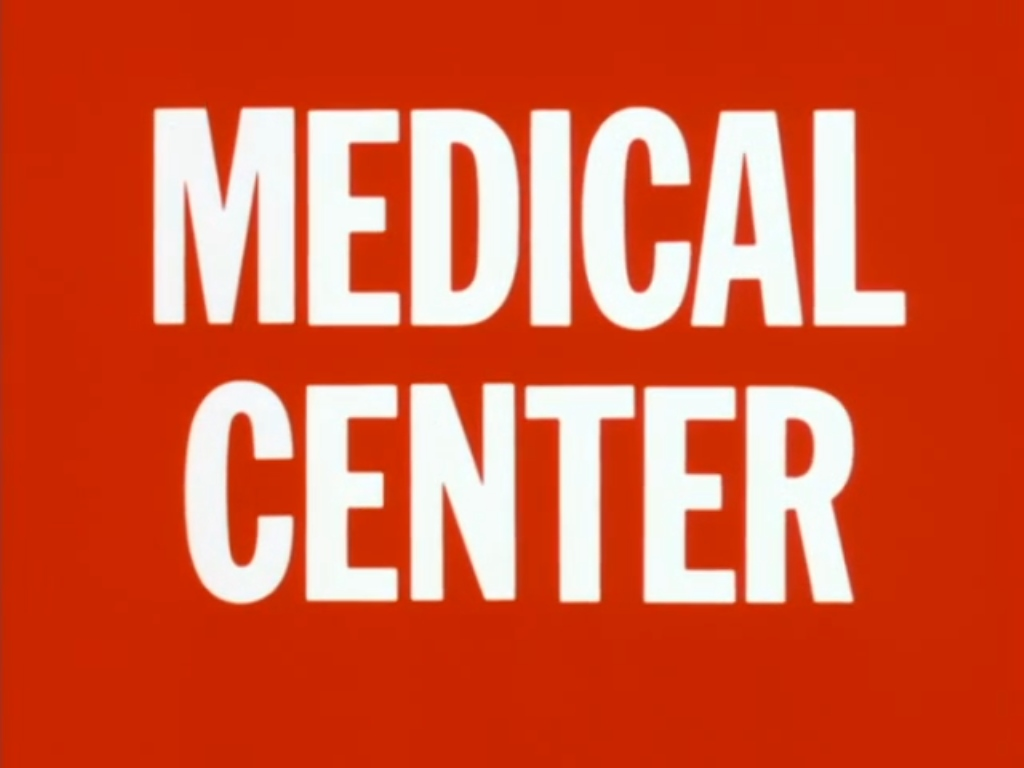
- Title sequence
- Also known as: U.M.C. (pilot only)
- Created by: Al C. Ward; Frank Glicksman
- Starring: James Daly; Chad Everett; Audrey Totter
- Composer: Lalo Schifrin
- No. of seasons: 7
- No. of episodes: 170 (list of episodes)

Production
- Running time: 60 minutes
- Production companies: Alfra Productions; Metro-Goldwyn-Mayer Television

Original release
- Network: CBS
- Release: September 24, 1969 – March 15, 1976

Medical Center is an American medical drama television series that aired on CBS for seven seasons from September 24, 1969, to March 15, 1976. After the final first-run telecast on CBS in March 1976, the series went into reruns from March 22 to September 6, 1976. It was produced by MGM Television.

== Plot ==
The show starred James Daly as Dr. Paul Lochner and Chad Everett as Dr. Joe Gannon, surgeons working in an otherwise unnamed university hospital in Los Angeles. The show focused both on the lives of the doctors and the patients showcased each week. At the core of the series was the tension between youth and experience, as seen between Drs. Lochner and Gannon. Besides his work as a surgeon, Gannon, because of his age, also worked as the head of the student health department at the university. Helping the doctors was the very efficient Nurse Eve Wilcox, played by Audrey Totter. She started out as a bit role, but was eventually upgraded to co‑star status starting in 1972. Wilcox became a regular after two other similar nurses (Nurse Chambers, played by Jayne Meadows; and Nurse Murphy played by Jane Dulo) had basically served the same functions as Wilcox.

== Cast ==
- James Daly as Dr. Paul Lochner
- Chad Everett as Dr. Joe Gannon
- Chris Hutson as Nurse Courtland
- Virginia Hawkins as Nurse Evvie Canford
- Daniel Silver as Anesthesiologist
- Audrey Totter as Nurse Eve Wilcox
- Corinne Camacho as Dr. Jeanne Bartlett
- Eugene Peterson as Dr. Merrill Weller
- Ed Hall as Dr. Stan Bricker
- Jayne Meadows as Nurse Chambers
- Fred Holliday as Dr. Barnes
- Jane Adrian as Nurse Joyce Baxter

== Production ==
=== Pilot ===
The series' pilot film, U.M.C., was televised on CBS on April 17, 1969, starring Edward G. Robinson as Dr. Lee Forestman and Richard Bradford as Dr. Joe Gannon, with Daly and Totter appearing in the roles they later played in the series; the film also starred Kim Stanley, Maurice Evans, Kevin McCarthy, and Shelley Fabares. In the film, a widow accused Dr. Gannon of allowing her husband to die, so his heart could be implanted into Dr. Forestman, who was a mentor and friend to Dr. Gannon.

The pilot telefilm was released as a part of the Manufacture-on-Demand Warner Archive Collection from Warner Bros. on January 12, 2010, as Operation Heartbeat. Warner Archive titles are available exclusively through Warner's online store and only in the United States.

=== Cancellation ===
At the time the show was cancelled, it tied with Marcus Welby, M.D. (which also ran from 1969 to 1976) as the longest-running medical drama on television at that point.

== Episodes ==
Season	Episodes	Originally released	
Season	Episodes	First released	Last released
Pilot		April 17, 1969	
1	26	September 24, 1969	April 15, 1970
2	24	September 16, 1970	March 10, 1971
3	24	September 15, 1971	March 8, 1972
4	24	September 13, 1972	February 28, 1973
5	24	September 10, 1973	April 15, 1974
6	24	September 9, 1974	March 24, 1975
7	24	September 8, 1975	March 15, 1976

== Ratings ==
The show's Nielsen ratings are as follows:

Season	Ranking
1969–70	#7
1970–71	#8
1971–72	#13
1972–73	#21
1973–74	#39
1974–75	#27
1975–76	#35

== Home media ==
Warner Bros. has released the seven seasons on DVD in region 1 via their Warner Archive Collection. These are manufacture-on-demand releases, available exclusively through Warner's online store and Amazon.com.

DVD name	Ep. #	Release date
The Complete First Season	26	July 12, 2011
The Complete Second Season	24	September 18, 2012
The Complete Third Season	24	June 25, 2013
The Complete Fourth Season	24	March 18, 2014
The Complete Fifth Season	24	July 15, 2014
The Complete Sixth Season	24	March 15, 2016
The Complete Seventh Season	24	July 19, 2016
