= Stephen Brooks (actor) =

American actor (1942–1999)

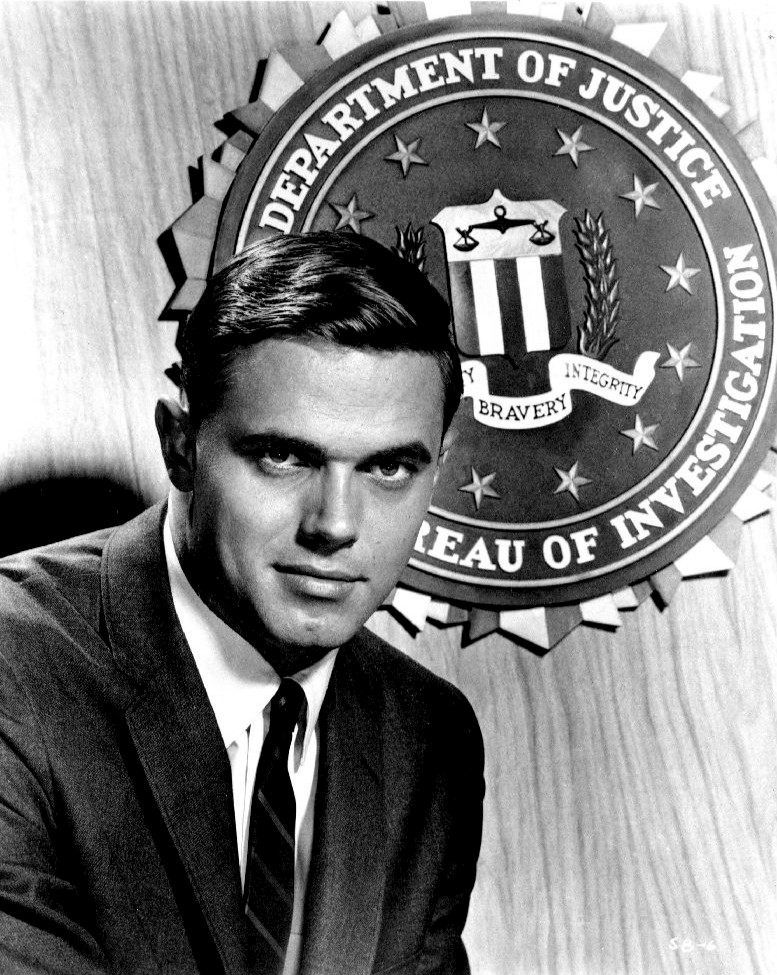
- Brooks as Jim Rhodes.
- Born: James Gardner Brooks Jr. August 12, 1942; Columbus, Ohio, U.S.
- Died: December 1, 1999 (aged 57); Seattle, Washington, U.S.
- Occupation: Actor

James Gardner Brooks Jr. (August 12, 1942 – December 1, 1999), known as Stephen Brooks, was an American film and television actor.

== Life ==
Stephen Brooks was born in Columbus, Ohio to parents James Gardner Brooks Sr. and Margaret Froehlich. His father, who was an executive for the U.S. Steel Corporation, died in 1958. Brooks was the eldest of three children, having two younger sisters named Christy and Stephanie. He attended high school at New Trier High School in Winnetka, Illinois and attended the American Academy of Dramatic Arts in New York City for two years.

Brooks was best known as Special Agent Jim Rhodes in the first two seasons of the television series The F.B.I. (1965-1967). His guest appearances included roles as Ensign Garrovick in the Star Trek episode "Obsession" (1967), and as Officer Joe Nash in The Invaders second-season episode "The Life Seekers" (1968). Brooks also played Dr. Greg Pettit as part of an ensemble cast from the short-lived medical drama, The Interns (1971-1972).

== Death ==
He died of a heart attack, aged 57, in Seattle, Washington.
