= Frank Glicksman =

American producer and screenwriter

- Born: Frank Leonard Glicksman; June 29, 1921; New York, U.S.
- Died: January 19, 1984 (aged 62); Los Angeles, California, U.S.
- Education: University of California
- Occupations: Producer, screenwriter
- Spouse: Pearl Glicksman
- Children: 1

Frank Leonard Glicksman (June 29, 1921 – January 19, 1984) was an American producer and screenwriter. He was known for developing the medical drama television series Trapper John, M.D. with Don Brinkley. Glicksman also co-created the medical drama television series Medical Center with Al C. Ward. His producing and screenwriting credits include Custer, The Long, Hot Summer, Climax! and 12 O'Clock High. He died in January 1984 at the Cedars-Sinai Medical Center in Los Angeles, California, at the age of 62.
