= Charles Larson (producer) =

American screenwriter and producer

Charles Larson (23 October 1922 – 21 September 2006) was a writer and producer of television programs. He was born in Portland, Oregon, USA.

Beginning his Hollywood career as a messenger for MGM, Larson ultimately became a screenwriter for short films and later for television. His TV writing credits during the 1950s include Studio One, The Lone Ranger and Climax!. During the 1960s, he wrote episodes for The Virginian and Rawhide. In 1964, he became an associate producer on Twelve O'Clock High for which he also wrote five episodes. He then became a producer for The F.B.I., for which he earned an Emmy Award nomination in 1969. He also wrote and directed several episodes of that series.

Larson also produced and wrote for the TV shows The Interns and Cade's County. During the late 1970s and early 1980s, he wrote for Hawaii Five-O, Trapper John, M.D. and parts 5, 7, 9, and 11 of the epic mini-series Centennial. He was the executive producer of the short-lived 1974 ABC police drama Nakia and he also wrote for the show.

Larson died in Portland, Oregon on 21 September 2006.
