= Charlie's Angels season 4 =

Charlie's Angels
- Season 4
- No. of episodes: 26

Release
- Original release: September 12, 1979 – May 7, 1980

Season chronology
- ← Previous; Season 3 Next → Season 5

This is a list of episodes for the fourth season of the TV series Charlie's Angels. Originally aired from September 12, 1979 to May 7, 1980 for a total of 25 episodes, the season starred Jaclyn Smith, Cheryl Ladd, David Doyle, and introduced Shelley Hack as new angel Tiffany Welles, a police graduate from Boston. Original star Farrah Fawcett also reprises her role as Jill Munroe in three episodes.

The fourth season of the show saw a further decline in viewing figures, but still remained in the top 20 (#17 in the Nielsen chart); some believing Shelley Hack was to blame, others are of the opinion that the change in format from team oriented episodes to episodes that focused on only one Angel caused the rating decline.

Season 4 also has the only episode of the entire series without Charlie ("Avenging Angel").

== Cast and characters ==
=== Main cast ===
- Jaclyn Smith as Kelly Garrett
- Cheryl Ladd as Kris Munroe
- Shelley Hack as Tiffany Welles
- David Doyle as John Bosley
- John Forsythe as Charles "Charlie" Townsend (voice)

=== Notable guest stars ===
- Farrah Fawcett as Jill Munroe
- Bert Convy
- Robert Englund
- Dick Sargent
- Steve Kanaly
- Timothy Dalton
- Sally Kirkland
- Joanna Pettet
- Tab Hunter
- Barbara Stanwyck
- Patrick Duffy
- Robert Reed
- Cesar Romero
- Ray Milland
- Marilù Tolo
- Stacy Peralta

== Episodes ==
No. overall	No. in season	Title	Directed by	Written by	Original release date
73	1	"Love Boat Angels"	Allen Baron	Edward J. Lakso	September 12, 1979
74	2	"Love Boat Angels"	Allen Baron	Edward J. Lakso	September 12, 1979
Tiffany Welles joins the Townsend Agency after Sabrina has quit to get married and start a family. Charlie tells his girls to take a cruise on the Pacific Princess to catch art thief Paul Hollister. Kris offers to get close to their target, but soon begins to feel an attraction to him. Guest stars: Bert Convy, Bo Hopkins, Sandy McPeak, Dick Sargent, Barry Sullivan, Gavin MacLeod, Bernie Kopell, Fred Grandy, Ted Lange, Lauren Tewes, Judy Landers, and Read Morgan. Notes: This is a crossover episode combining Charlie's Angels and another Aaron Spelling-produced series, The Love Boat. Originally shown as a two-hour season premiere, but in syndication is shown as two separate episodes.
75	3	"Angels Go Truckin'"	Lawrence Dobkin	Richard Carr	September 19, 1979
Kris and Tiffany go to trucking school to investigate an all-female trucking line whose cargo has been stolen under their very noses. Kelly goes undercover as a waitress. Guest stars: Joanne Linville, Royce D. Applegate, Mickey Jones, Bill Zuckert, Eric Lawson, and Gary Grubbs.
76	4	"Avenging Angel"	Allen Baron	T : Edward J. Lakso; S : Laurie Lakso	September 26, 1979
Frank Desmond is released from prison and proceeds to revenge himself on his jailer, Kelly Garrett, by injecting her with heroin. This leads the men he stole the drugs from to think Desmond and Kelly are partners in crime. Guest stars: Cameron Mitchell, Stephen McNally, Dick Bakalyan, Steve Kanaly, and Tim Rossovich. Notes: The only episode in which John Forsythe does not take part.
77	5	"Angels at the Altar"	Lawrence Dobkin	Larry Alexander	October 3, 1979
Kelly is to be maid of honor at her friend Sharon's wedding. When there are several attempts to murder the groom, Tiffany goes undercover as a violinist, Bosley tends bar and Kris joins the wedding party as waitress. Guest stars: Kim Cattrall, John David Carson, Adrienne Larussa, Robert Walker, Walter Brooke, Marie Windsor, Parley Baer, and Ivan Bonar. Production code: H-73
78	6	"Fallen Angel"	Allen Baron	Kathryn Michaelian Powers	October 24, 1979
The Angels are hired to catch Damien 'Ice Cat' Roth, a millionaire playboy/jewel thief, who also happens to be in love with former Angel Jill Munroe. Guest stars: Farrah Fawcett, Timothy Dalton, Marilù Tolo, Michael De Lano, Richard Roat, Sandra Caron, and Gregory Itzin
79	7	"Caged Angel"	Dennis Donnelly	B.W. Sandefur	October 31, 1979
Kris goes undercover as an inmate in Colejo Prison to ferret out a gang of jewel thieves operating from there. Guest stars: Shirley Stoler, Louise Sorel, Sally Kirkland, Rose Gregorio, Tisha Sterling, Ellen Geer, Walter Mathews, Lynn Carlin, and Harry Northrup.
80	8	"Angels on the Street"	Don Chaffey	T : Edward J. Lakso; S : Laurie Lakso	November 7, 1979
When a young female music teacher gets beaten up by a ruthless neighbourhood pimp, the Angels go undercover as streetwalkers to bring him to justice – and discover an unexpected psychological crisis. Guest stars: Richard Lynch, Ford Rainey, Madlyn Rhue, Richard Karron, Amy Johnston, and Conrad Palmisano.
81	9	"The Prince and the Angel"	Cliff Bole	T : Edward J. Lakso; S : Laurie Lakso	November 14, 1979
While in town for Charlie’s upcoming birthday party, former Angel Jill is wooed by a charismatic European crown prince. But the prince’s every move is shadowed by a professional assassin whose objective puts Jill in the firing line. Guest stars: Farrah Fawcett, Leonard Mann, Karl Held, Tom Spratley, and Stacy Peralta.
82	10	"Angels on Skates"	Don Chaffey	T : Michael Michaelian (as Michael Michalian); S/T : John Francis Whelpley	November 21, 1979
At Venice Beach, the Angels witness the abduction of a young woman performing as a roller-skater. They discover that the kidnap victim is actually an heiress to a considerable fortune. But who at Venice Beach knew of the young woman's true identity? Kris goes undercover at Freddie Fortune's disco rink, to find out. Guest stars: Ed Begley Jr., Roz Kelly, Chris Mulkey, Joanna Barnes, Rene Auberjonois, Nicholas Worth, and Virgil Frye
83	11	"Angels on Campus"	Don Chaffey	Michael Michaelian	November 28, 1979
Two young girls from Tiffany's old sorority Kappa Omega Psi have been kidnapped to be sold as white slaves to a sheik, so Tiff and Kris return to college. Guest stars: Gary Collins, Nita Talbot, Jo Ann Pflug, Paul Cavonis, Nina Axelrod, and Robyn Blythe.
84	12	"Angel Hunt"	Paul Stanley	Lee Sheldon	December 5, 1979
A mysterious phone call lures the Angels to a remote island off the coast of Mexico. Charlie and Bosley learn that the Angels are bait, to be hunted and killed one by one until the hunter-in-chief's true prey surrenders to him. The hunters real objective is to kill none other than Charlie himself. Guest stars: Lloyd Bochner and L. Q. Jones.
85	13	"Cruising Angels"	George McCowan	B.W. Sandefur	December 12, 1979
While Bosley is romancing the interior decorator of Charlie's brand new yacht, criminals plan on using the Wayward Angel to transport a load of gold bouillon out of the country. As the Angels investigate, the gold's previous owner is also on the smugglers' trail. Guest stars: Peter Mark Richman, Rodolfo Hoyos, Reni Santoni, Gene Evans, Beverly Garland, Pepe Hern, and Noah Keen.
86	14	"Of Ghosts and Angels"	Cliff Bole	Kathryn Michaelian Powers	January 2, 1980
Tiffany is having psychic premonitions about history repeating itself during a costume party at the mansion of a recently married friend of hers. Guest stars: Paul Burke, Virginia Gregg, R. G. Armstrong, and Robin Mattson.
87	15	"Angel's Child"	Dennis Donnelly	Edward J. Lakso	January 9, 1980
Kelly discovers the police sergeant she is working with has a tendency to take out his rage on his young son and tries to get custody of the boy. Meanwhile, the masterminds of the case they are investigating have their own plans for Kelly, the cop and his son. Guest stars: Simon Oakland, Michael Whitney, and John Zaremba.
88	16	"One of Our Angels Is Missing"	Allen Baron	Robert S. Biheller & W. Dal Jenkins	January 16, 1980
Kris poses as a rich divorcée to find out why Vic Devlin has skipped parole. When the Angels proceed to lure him back to California, it turns out he is more dangerous than they first thought. Guest stars: Jonathan Goldsmith, Don "Red" Barry, Marc Alaimo, Warren Berlinger, and John Becher.
89	17	"Catch a Falling Angel"	Kim Manners	Edward J. Lakso	January 23, 1980
The Angels investigate the disappearance of a young man whose ex-girlfriend, Bess Hemsdale, has moved to the big city and joined the adult film industry under the name of 'Sally Storm'. Kris goes undercover as a potential starlet. Guest stars: Sully Boyar.
90	18	"Homes $weet Homes"	Allen Baron	S : Robert E. Lee & Ronald E. Osborn; S/T : William Froug	January 30, 1980
The Kingsbrook Realty Company, which has been linked to several robberies, is the subject of the girls' latest case. Kris joins the all-female agency, while Tiffany pretends to be selling a house (as well as being the owner of several valuable letters written by America's founding fathers). Bosley poses as a potential buyer. Guest stars: Dick Gautier, Sherry Jackson, Vito Scotti, Arthur Space, and Eugene Robert Glazer.
91	19	"Dancin' Angels"	Dennis Donnelly	Edward J. Lakso	February 6, 1980
After a disappearance and a murder at an old-fashioned ballroom dance contest, Bosley and Tiffany team up as a dancing couple. Meanwhile, Kris and Kelly try to get information from the club owners, who seem to think they are living in a Bogart movie. Guest stars: Cesar Romero, Norman Alden, Lee Delano, Brad Maule, and Lindsay Bloom. Filming dates: January 2–10, 1980 Production code: H-87
92	20	"Harrigan's Angel"	Don Chaffey	Edward J. Lakso	February 20, 1980
The Angels team up with alcoholic private eye Harrigan to investigate the robbery of an electronics plant. Kris takes a liking to the old man and tries to get him back on track. Guest stars: Howard Duff, Ed Nelson, Michael Cavanaugh, and Robert Englund.
93	21	"An Angel's Trail"	Dennis Donnelly	Wayne Cruseturner	February 27, 1980
Jill drives up to a robbery in progress at Pioneer Gasoline/The Rock Store. The perpetrator, along with his two sons as accomplices, decides he wants to take her as a hostage into the hills of the nearby isolated desert on their way to Canada. Guest stars: L. Q. Jones, Tracey Walter, John Lupton, John Dennis Johnston, and Farrah Fawcett's final guest star appearance as Jill Munroe.
94	22	"Nips and Tucks"	Don Chaffey	S : Cory Applebaum; S/T : B.W. Sandefur	March 5, 1980
When a renowned cosmetic surgeon is suspected of giving criminals a new face, Tiffany joins his staff as a nurse, while Bosley poses as a rich patient whose wife, played by Kris, wants him to improve his looks. Guest stars: Louis Jourdan, Tab Hunter, Corinne Michaels, and Joanna Pettet.
95	23	"Three for the Money"	George McCowan	Lee Sheldon	March 12, 1980
The Townsend Agency is hired by three people who have been separately conned by Harley Dexter. In order to get their money back, the Angels counterattack with three cons of their own: one involving Mayan art, another centered around a Rolls-Royce and the third concerning bribe money. Guest stars: Vincent Baggetta, Michael Pataki, William Wellman Jr., and Carol Bruce.
96	24	"Toni's Boys"	Ron Satlof	S : Robert Janes; S/T : Katharyn Powers	April 2, 1980
After an attempt is made on the Angels' lives, Charlie hires a rival detective agency run by his old friend, Antonia Blake, to keep an eye on his employees. Blake, who likes to be called 'Toni', assigns her three boys to the case. They are: former U.S. Olympic champion Bob Sorensen, master of disguise Matt Parrish and champion rodeo rider, roper and tracker Cotton Harper. The Angels, feeling they can solve the case themselves, try to ditch the men as soon as possible. Guest stars: Stephen Shortridge as Cotton Harper, Bob Seagren as Bob Sorensen, Barbara Stanwyck as Antonia Blake, Robert Loggia, Andy Romano, Tricia O'Neill, Roz Kelly, Ken Scott, and Yulis Ruval. Notes: This was a backdoor pilot for a Charlie's Angels spin-off called Toni's Boys, which never became a series. Filming dates: February 21-March 04, 1980 Production Code: H-92
97	25	"One Love... Two Angels"	Dennis Donnelly	B.W. Sandefur	April 30, 1980
98	26	"One Love... Two Angels"	Dennis Donnelly	B.W. Sandefur	May 7, 1980
Kelly is contacted by an attorney who tells her she may be the long-lost daughter of millionaire Oliver Barrows. When Barrows sees the resemblance between Kelly and his late wife, he is convinced she is his daughter, Margaret Ellen, but Kelly remains skeptical, so she hires the Townsend Agency to investigate. Bill Cord has fallen in love with both Kelly and Kris, driving a wedge between the two detectives. When Bill finds out Glenn Staley stands to gain from Kelly's death, he forfeits his own life. Now it is up to Tiffany and Bosley to hold the team together and solve the case. Guest stars: Patrick Duffy, Lynne Marta, Ray Milland, Robert Reed, Simon Scott, William Mims, and Harry Townes. Last appearance of Shelley Hack as Tiffany Welles.
