= Charlie's Angels season 2 =

Charlie's Angels
- Season 2
- No. of episodes: 26

Release
- Original release: September 14, 1977 – May 10, 1978

Season chronology
- ← Previous; Season 1 Next → Season 3

This is a list of episodes for the second season of the 1970s TV series Charlie's Angels. Originally aired from September 14, 1977, to May 10, 1978, for a total of 26 episodes, season two starred Kate Jackson, Jaclyn Smith, David Doyle, and introduced Cheryl Ladd as Kris Munroe, the younger sister of former Angel Jill Munroe (Farrah Fawcett-Majors).

Although there were initial doubts as to whether Ladd could fill the void left by Fawcett-Majors, after her enthusiastic "grand entrance" Kris was warmly welcomed. Co-star Jaclyn Smith said of Ladd: "She had big shoes to fill and she did it with confidence". With Ladd being accepted as Kris, ratings finished in the #4 slot for the season.

Although not an original cast member or character, Cheryl Ladd as Kris gained fame and popularity equal to the original Angels, leading her to become a major star of the series, with several episodes centered on her.

== Cast and characters ==
=== Main ===
- Kate Jackson as Sabrina Duncan
- Jaclyn Smith as Kelly Garrett
- Cheryl Ladd as Kris Munroe
- David Doyle as John Bosley
- John Forsythe as Charles "Charlie" Townsend (voice)

=== Notable guest stars ===
- Norman Fell
- Jim Backus
- Phil Silvers
- Don Ho
- Craig T. Nelson
- Elaine Joyce
- Judy Landers
- Dirk Benedict

== Episodes ==
No. overall	No. in season	Title	Directed by	Written by	Original release date
23	1	"Angels in Paradise"	Charles S. Dubin	John D. F. Black	September 14, 1977
24	2	"Angels in Paradise"	Charles S. Dubin	John D. F. Black	September 14, 1977
Two-hour season premiere. Just as Jill leaves the team to pursue an auto racing career, and new Angel Kris Munroe joins the team, someone abducts Charlie in Hawaii. The Angels go on an all-out search and meet a criminal kingpin who demands the Angels commit a jailbreak of her husband, only by then Charlie has been kidnapped by a rival gang. Guest stars: France Nuyen, Art Metrano, Norman Fell, Ron Soble, Cliff Emmich, Pat Suzuki, Don Ho, Al Harrington, Tad Horino, Mark Pinkosh (uncredited), and Ronnie Rondell Jr. (uncredited). Notes: This was the first of several two-hour specials. Originally shown as a two-hour season premiere movie, but in syndication is shown as two separate episodes.
25	3	"Angels on Ice"	Bob Kelljan	Rick Edelstein	September 21, 1977
26	4	"Angels on Ice"	Bob Kelljan	Rick Edelstein	September 21, 1977
Another two-hour special, where the Angels go undercover as Kris becomes a clown skater, Kelly an Ice Capades chorus member and belly dancer, and with Sabrina's help, they uncover an unusual murder plot. Guest stars: Harvey Jason, Edward Andrews, James Gammon, Lee Delano, Timothy Agoglia Carey, Jim Backus, Phil Silvers, Eric Kilpatrick, and Paul Wexler. Notes: Originally shown as a two-hour TV movie, but in syndication is shown as two separate episodes. Filming dates: July 5–22, 1977 Production code: H-23
27	5	"Pretty Angels All in a Row"	John D. F. Black	John D. F. Black	September 28, 1977
The Angels become beauty contestants to find out who is scaring off the contestants in order to win one of them by all means. Guest stars: Burton Gilliam, Richard Kelton, Steve Franken, Patricia Barry, Bill McIntyre, Marki Bey, Don Starr, Dana Kimmel, Nancy Cameron, Denise DuBarry, and Marcy Hanson.
28	6	"Angel Flight"	Dennis Donnelly	Brian McKay	October 5, 1977
When a college friend who teaches stewardesses is being stalked, the Angels come aboard to fly the not so friendly skies. On a training flight, a killer is loose on board the jetliner and there is no cockpit crew. Guest stars: Robert Gentry, Marshall Thompson, and Phil Roth.
29	7	"Circus of Terror"	Allen Baron	Robert Janes	October 19, 1977
The Angels join the circus to uncover who is behind all the "accidents" that threaten to close it for good. Kelly is a motorcycle stunt rider, Sabrina is a mime and Kris goes under the knife as a knife thrower's assistant. Guest stars: James Darren, Charles Tyner, Denny Miller, Patty Maloney, Marvin Kaplan, Read Morgan, Tom Reese, Ramon Bieri, and Jerry Maren (uncredited).
30	8	"Angel in Love"	Paul Stanley	Skip Webster & Jock Mackelvie	October 26, 1977
While the Angels are tracking down clues to the murder of a health resort employee, they uncover a $2 million aircraft hijacking mystery. Guest stars: Peter Haskell, Carole Cook, Tom Simcox, and Amanda McBroom.
31	9	"Unidentified Flying Angels"	Allen Baron	Ronald Austin & James David Buchanan	November 2, 1977
UFOs, mysterious disappearances and the murder of a wealthy old lady put the Angels on the trail of a killer. Sabrina acts as a pushy Bronx reporter, Bosley and Kris as a sugar daddy and his ditzy wife, and Kelly impersonates an alien. Guest stars: Dennis Cole, Ross Martin, Ken Olfson, Ernestine Barrier, Nancy Cameron, and Ethelreda Leopold, (uncredited).
32	10	"Angels on the Air"	George W. Brooks	William Froug	November 9, 1977
The Angels join a radio station's new staff to prevent the murder of a beautiful reporter while Kris investigates a Charles Manson-like hippie. Guest stars: Nicolas Coster, Linda Dano, and Judith-Marie Bergan.
33	11	"Angel Baby"	Paul Stanley	T : John D. F. Black; S/T : George R. Hodges	November 16, 1977
The Angels investigate a murder and discover a shocking traffic in black market babies. Sabrina is an adoptive mother, Kelly helps deliver a baby, and Kris is badly shaken as she shoots the culprit, her first time. Guest stars: Edward Winter, Scott Colomby, John Karlen, Bruce Fairbairn, Sunny Johnson, Jean Allison, and Ivy Bethune. Notes: This is the first episode where one of Charlie's Angels shoots someone, and it is Kris with the honors in this one; the epilogue his survival.
34	12	"Angels in the Wings"	Dennis Donnelly	Edward J. Lakso	November 23, 1977
Kris is singing "Sweet Misery" when she appears in a movie musical to help find out who is trying to kill actress Ellen Jason. Guest stars: Gene Barry, Michael Fox, Nehemiah Persoff, Shani Wallis, Lew Palter, Michael Fairman, Hal Needham, and Tony Epper. Notes: Cheryl Ladd, who launched a solo singing career during her time on the series, sings in this episode. Jaclyn Smith doubles as another actress who died under mysterious circumstances in the same sound stage, in a Phantom of the Opera-type twist.
35	13	"Magic Fire"	Leon Carrere	Lee Sheldon	November 30, 1977
The Angels are hired to clear magician Wendell Muse as the prime suspect in mysterious arson fires set by the "Magic Man". Sabrina poses as a French fashion designer, Kelly a magician's daughter looking to sell the secret to a famous illusion, and Bosley and Kris perform their own magic act. They find the culprit sets fire by remote, and Sabrina's angle heats up quickly. Meanwhile, Kris is unaware that, during a routine, the audience member that she went to perform a trick for was Charlie. Guest stars: Victoria Carroll, Howard Witt, and E. J. André.
36	14	"Sammy Davis, Jr. Kidnap Caper"	Ronald Austin	Ron Friedman	December 7, 1977
The Angels become bodyguards for Sammy Davis Jr. to protect him from further kidnapping attempts. Guest stars: Norman Alden, Robert Pine, Altovise Davis, Martin Kove, Lee Jones De Broux, Harry Rhodes, Betty McGuire, and Arthur Tovey (uncredited).
37	15	"Angels on Horseback"	George W. Brooks	Edward J. Lakso	December 21, 1977
The Angels go to a dude ranch to find out who has killed one of the guests. Guest stars: Angel Tompkins, Woodrow Parfrey, William Phipps, James Sikking, Ted Markland, Buddy Joe Hooker, and Hal Riddle.
38	16	"Game, Set, Death"	Georg Stanford Brown	Worley Thorne	January 4, 1978
The Angels join the tennis circuit as top players become victims of accidents and murder. Guest stars: Bibi Besch, Larry Block, Tiffany Bolling, and David T. Hayman.
39	17	"Hours of Desperation"	Cliff Bole	Ray Brenner	January 11, 1978
After two diamond thieves are double-crossed, they take the Angels hostage to help the crooks retrieve their stolen diamonds. Guest stars: Stanley Kamel, Peter Palmer, John Quade, Taurean Blacque, Paul Sorensen, and Barbara Baldavin.
40	18	"Diamond in the Rough"	Ronald Austin	T : Ronald Austin & James D. Buchanan; S/T : Brian McKay	January 18, 1978
The Angels are hired by Freddie the Fox to help steal back a diamond and return it to its rightful owner. The Angels travel to the Caribbean and execute an elaborate jewel heist, and Kris falls for the son of the villain. Guest stars: Dan O'Herlihy, Bert Remsen, Sid Haig, René Enríquez, Tony Giorgio, Michael Evans and John Winston.
41	19	"Angels in the Backfield"	Georg Stanford Brown	Edward J. Lakso	January 25, 1978
The Angels tackle a bunch of crooks who are trying to knock a women's football team out of the game. Kelly has a catfight with a towel-clad lady in the women's shower room before the real motive behind the attacks is uncovered. Guest stars: Garn Stephens and L. Q. Jones.
42	20	"The Sandcastle Murders"	George McCowan	T : Skip Webster & Jock Mackelvie and Ronald Austin & James D. Buchanan; S/T : Robert C. Dennis	February 1, 1978
When investigating a cosmetics company, the Angels must intercept a strangler obsessed with blue-eyed blonde women or Kris will be the next victim on his list, culminating in a harrowing Strangers on a Train finale at a merry-go-round. Guest stars: Alan Feinstein, John Crawford, Bibi Osterwald, Hunter von Leer, Melody Thomas, Steve Sandor, and Jason Evers.
43	21	"Angel Blues"	Georg Stanford Brown	Edward J. Lakso	February 8, 1978
The Angels retrace the steps surrounding the mysterious murder of a country-western singer. As Sabrina and Kelly uncover the clues and events that led up the singer's death, the killers work to cover their tracks, also killing her boyfriend while Kris, posing as a reporter, rides with the cab driver who was the last to see her alive. Guest stars: Bill Quinn, Vincent Schiavelli, Steve Gravers, Tim Rossovich, and Lynne Marta.
44	22	"Mother Goose is Running for His Life"	George McCowan	T : Ronald Austin & James D. Buchanan; S/T : Del Reisman	February 15, 1978
Deadly toys are appearing at the Mother Goose Toy Company and it is up to the Angels to solve the case. Kris impersonates a life-sized rag doll. Guest stars: Murray Matheson, Clifford David, Don Knight, Bobbi Jordan, Eldon Quick, John Roselius, and Tiffany Bolling (uncredited).
45	23	"Little Angels of the Night"	Georg Stanford Brown	Mickey Rose	February 22, 1978
The Angels go undercover in the twilight world of vice to discover why three beautiful call girls have been murdered. They find an unlikely link between the apartment complex where the victims live and the restaurant across the street. Kris fits the profile of the dead girls and finds herself trapped with the psychotic killer. Guest stars: Paul Cavonis, Rod Colbin, Mike Warren, James Mitchell, and Joy Garrett.
46	24	"The Jade Trap"	George McCowan	T : Lee Sheldon; S : Tom Lazarus	March 1, 1978
The Angels solve two cases: A beautiful millionaire plays with fire when she betrays a playboy and the Angels have to smoke out her killer. At the same luxury residence, a cat burglar is making the rounds. The killer and cat burglar cross paths when they see each other. Kris poses as a Swedish movie star and Bosley complicates the case when acting as an auctioneer; he sells a valuable jade item meant as bait. Guest stars: Barry Bostwick, Victoria Shaw, Irene Hervey, Dirk Benedict, Lurene Tuttle, Joan Leslie, and Ethelreda Leopold (uncredited).
47	25	"Angels on the Run"	Bob Kelljan	T : Edward J. Lakso; S : Laurie Lakso	May 3, 1978
An aspiring singer Sue Kantrelle hires the Angels to find her philandering husband Larry who has disappeared. Unbeknownst to him, jewel thieves hid a fortune in jewels in his truck cargo, which he left with one of his several girlfriends, and the thieves kidnap him to get the jewels back. Now Kelly must step in for the singer, and when she is kidnapped as well, the other Angels must track her before her cover is blown. Guest stars: Carole Mallory as Rosey, Belinda Balaski as Sue Kantrelle, Bill Duke as David Pearl, Elaine Joyce as Nancy, Judy Landers as Mrs. Chicken, and Craig T. Nelson as Stone. Note: The sign outside the Backwoods Café mentions a performance by The Lakso Trio, referring to story editor Edward J. Lakso and his daughter Laurie, who contributed the idea for this episode.
48	26	"Antique Angels"	Leon Carrere	T : Edward J. Lakso; S : Lee Travis	May 10, 1978
A space age fuel is stolen and the Angels track down the thieves to an antique car rally, where they pose as Keystone Cops. Bosley flips over a lovely lady enrolled in the rally. Guest stars: Kenneth Tigar, Ken Scott, Sandy Ward, and Mala Powers.
