= Charlie's Angels season 3 =

Season of television series

Charlie's Angels
- Season 3
- No. of episodes: 24

Release
- Original release: September 13, 1978 – May 16, 1979

Season chronology
- ← Previous; Season 2 Next → Season 4

This is a list of episodes for the third season of the 1970s TV series Charlie's Angels. It was originally broadcast from September 13, 1978 to May 16, 1979 for a total of 22 episodes, including two double-length episodes. This was the only season of the show not to feature a casting change. In addition, original star Farrah Fawcett-Majors returned as Jill Munroe, appearing as a guest-star in three episodes.

Although it remained popular, the third season of Charlie's Angels saw a decline in viewing figures, dropping to #12 in the Nielsen ratings (from a high of #4 for the 1977–78 season). A fourth season was commissioned, with Shelley Hack replacing Kate Jackson (who departed the show at the end of this season) as Boston-detective Tiffany Welles.

== Cast and characters ==
=== Main ===
- Kate Jackson as Sabrina Duncan
- Jaclyn Smith as Kelly Garrett
- Cheryl Ladd as Kris Munroe
- David Doyle as John Bosley
- John Forsythe as Charles "Charlie" Townsend (voice)

=== Notable guest stars ===
- Farrah Fawcett-Majors as Jill Munroe
- Dick Sargent
- Stephen Collins
- Mercedes McCambridge
- Jamie Lee Curtis
- Anne Francis
- Audrey Landers
- Dennis Cole
- Gary Collins
- Casey Kasem
- Dean Martin
- Scatman Crothers

== Episodes ==
No. overall	No. in season	Title	Directed by	Written by	Original release date
49	1	"Angels in Vegas"	Bob Kelljan	Edward J. Lakso	September 13, 1978
50	2	"Angels in Vegas"	Bob Kelljan	Edward J. Lakso	September 13, 1978
Two-hour season premiere. When violent and suspicious deaths strike his closest friends, a casino boss hires the Angels to go undercover at the Tropicana Casino in Las Vegas. The Angels must discover the culprit behind the series of mysterious murders before it's too late. Guest stars: Dean Martin, Scatman Crothers, Vic Morrow, Dick Sargent, Michael Conrad, Herbert Edelman, Robert Urich as Dan Tanna (the main character of Vega$), James Hong, Ron Rondell, Gary Brockette, and Sid Conrad. Notes: The episode was originally shown as the two-hour season premiere, but in syndication it is shown as two separate episodes. It aired one week before the Vega$ season one debut
51	3	"Angel Come Home"	Paul Stanley	Stephen Kandel (as Stephen Kandell)	September 20, 1978
The Angels begin some high gear sleuthing when a car explosion kills Jill's fiancé and she becomes the next target in this high-speed adventure. Guest stars: Farrah Fawcett-Majors, Stephen Collins, Jackie Stewart, Dolly Martin, Horst Bucholz and Martin Azarow. Notes: This episode marks the first of six return guest appearances of Farrah Fawcett-Majors, reprising her role as Jill Munroe. There were also constant changes of hairstyles and clothes in each scene in this episode.
52	4	"Angel on High"	Larry Doheny	Edward J. Lakso	September 27, 1978
The Angels are hired by their wheelchair-using client to find his potential heir. The case takes them to the Reno Air Show where Kelly not only finds romance, but hitmen, too. Guest stars: Bert Freed, Johnny Seven, Michael Goodwin, Bill Zuckert, Annalee Jefferies, and Jared Martin (uncredited).
53	5	"Angels in Springtime"	Larry Stewart	William Froug	October 11, 1978
When a famous stage actress is electrocuted at an exclusive women's spa, the Angels are hired to capture the murderer and find a missing manuscript. Kris is an aerobics instructor, Sabrina a chef, and Kelly a guest. The Angels know they are on the right trail when Kris gets locked in a sauna and Bosley has to stage a power outage to gain entrance to the exclusive women-only resort. Guest stars: Joan Hotchkis, Nancy Parsons, Marie Windsor, and Mercedes McCambridge.
54	6	"Winning Is for Losers"	Cliff Bole	Ray Brenner	October 18, 1978
When an ambitious professional golfer competing for first prize money in a high-profile tournament is suddenly shot at, the Angels are brought in to solve the mystery. Kris wrestles an alligator. Guest stars: Jamie Lee Curtis, Casey Kasem, Ray Wise, E. J. Peaker, Buck Young, Eugene Jackson (uncredited), Ethelreda Leopold (uncredited).
55	7	"Haunted Angels"	Ronald Austin	Lee Sheldon	October 25, 1978
With the intent of contacting a beloved nephew who was killed four years earlier in a motorcycle accident, the Angels are hired by his aunt Claire to pose as psychics in order to uncover a possible fraud. Guest stars: Linden Chiles, Roger Bowen, Gretchen Wyler, and Peter Donat.
56	8	"Pom Pom Angels"	Cliff Bole	Richard Carr	November 1, 1978
One by one, three sexy cheerleaders are kidnapped by a small band of religious fanatics. In order to crack the case, the Angels must grab their pom-poms to catch the culprits behind this insidious plot. Guest stars: Lonny Chapman, Ben Davidson, Fran Ryan, Anne Francis, and Sandy Ward.
57	9	"Angels Ahoy"	Allen Baron	Lee Sheldon	November 8, 1978
An innocent woman is murdered after she identifies an escaped convict aboard a luxury liner. The Angels are assigned to infiltrate the ship and discover a ring that assists criminals in escaping the country. At a costume party, ballerina Kelly finally solves the case, but not before the villains try to drown her. Bosley befriends a lovely lady who turns out to be a black widow. Guest stars: Peter Brown, Jack Murdock, Doug Sheehan, Parley Baer, and Janis Paige.
58	10	"Mother Angel"	Don Chaffey	Rift Fournier	November 15, 1978
Danger is close at the heels of the Angels as Jill joins their search for the killer of a victim who was accidentally discovered by a precocious girl. Guest stars: Farrah Fawcett-Majors, Gary Collins, Roy Jenson, Hermione Baddeley, Robert Davi, Olivia Barash, John Steadman, Peggy Rea, and Mike Mazurki.
59	11	"Angel on My Mind"	Curtis Harrington	Edward J. Lakso	November 22, 1978
After witnessing a murder, Kris suffers from amnesia and wanders away from the crime scene. Now it is up to Sabrina and Kelly to find Kris before the murderer does. Guest stars: Michael Whitney, Tom Spratley, Billy Barty, Jonathan Frakes, Frank Doubleday, and Jordan Ladd (uncredited).
60	12	"Angels Belong in Heaven"	Paul Stanley	Edward J. Lakso	December 6, 1978
When an old friend is targeted to be killed, he leaves an urgent message for Charlie, warning him that someone is out to destroy one of his Angels. Guest stars: Don Galloway, Lloyd Bochner, Eddie Firestone, Barry Quinn, and John Voldstad.
61	13	"Angels in the Stretch"	Lawrence Doheny	Bob and Esther Mitchell	December 20, 1978
A wealthy gambler is murdered at a racetrack, so the Angels go undercover and discover a scheme where a losing horse is being switched with his winning twin. Sabrina is charmed by an Irish groom, but his involvement in the case could potentially chill their romance. Guest stars: John David Carson, James Gammon, Dick Bakalyan, Sidney Clute, Joyce Jameson, David Hedison, and Tucker Smith (uncredited).
62	14	"Angels on Vacation"	Don Weis (as Don Weiss)	Edward J. Lakso	January 10, 1979
While vacationing in Arizona with Kris's family, the Angels learn that gangsters have taken all the women in the small town hostage in exchange for one of their strongmen. The Angels dress as spinsters to attack the gangsters and free the captured women. Guest stars: Denny Miller, Lyle Talbot, Ron Soble, Lee Delano, John McIntire, Jeanette Nolan, Jason Wingreen, Herb Vigran, Eve McVeagh, and Georgia Schmidt.
63	15	"Counterfeit Angels"	Georg Stanford Brown	Richard Carr	January 24, 1979
A devious scam is devised by three doppelganger women who pose as the Angels in order to rob a sports arena box office. The real Angels go undercover to capture their impostors when warrants are issued for their arrest. Guest stars: Hilary Thompson, Wynn Irwin, Paul Cavonis, Bubba Smith, Noah Keen, Mark Lonow, Ellyn Stern, and Tommy Reamon.
64	16	"Disco Angels"	Georg Stanford Brown	George Slavin	January 31, 1979
When the Angels are summoned to investigate a strangulation, it leads them to the popular Freddie's Disco where they go undercover to prevent another killing. Kris burns up the floor, but she struggles with an unbalanced disc jockey. Guest stars: Zalman King, Shera Danese, Robert Symonds, Gregory Rozakis, Diane McBain, Titos Vandis, and Arthur Malet.
65	17	"Terror on Skis"	Don Chaffey	Edward J. Lakso	February 7, 1979
66	18	"Terror on Skis"	Don Chaffey	Edward J. Lakso	February 7, 1979
When a plot to kidnap the President's Special Envoy to the United Nations unravels at the site of the World Pro-Am Ski Competition, a government agent enlists the Angels to protect the envoy. Sabrina races against time to escape from her captors, the members of an extremist Italian radical group, and warn the other Angels of terrorist activity before time runs out. Guest stars: Cesare Danova, Dennis Cole, Chris George, Kathleen Nolan, Rossano Brazzi, and Burt Douglas.
67	19	"Angel in a Box"	Curtis Harrington	Edward J. Lakso	February 14, 1979
When Kris is mysteriously kidnapped, Jill returns to town to help locate her sister, but soon discovers that she was the real target for a business mogul blaming her for his son's untimely death. Guest stars: Farrah Fawcett-Majors, John Colicos, Ed Bakey, Perry Lopez, and Art La Fleur.
68	20	"Teen Angels"	Allen Baron	T : Bob and Esther Mitchell; S : Laurie Lakso	February 28, 1979
When a murder occurs at a posh all-girls school, the Angels assume false identities only to discover a ring of girls involved in drug and alcohol abuse. Guest stars: Audrey Landers, Debi Richter, Lori Lethin, and Hal Englund.
69	21	"Marathon Angels"	Bob Kelljan	Edward J. Lakso	March 7, 1979
When the Angels investigate the unusual disappearance of two participants in a marathon, Kris and Kelly join the race to literally chase down the suspects. Everyone has an angle for the highly publicized female-only race. Guest stars: Sarah Purcell, Ronnie Schell, Walter Brooke, Andre Philippe, and Louise Fitch.
70	22	"Angels in Waiting"	Allen Baron	Edward J. Lakso	March 21, 1979
Bosley becomes annoyed with being so predictable and decides to play a game with the Angels to see if they can figure out the clues to his whereabouts. Unknown to Bosley, he is actually a target for a dangerous ex-con. Guest stars: Pat Crowley, James B. Sikking, and Tad Tadlock.
71	23	"Rosemary, For Remembrance"	Ronald Austin	Lee Sheldon	May 2, 1979
When an ex-mobster is targeted for murder, the Angels are called in by his nephew to investigate. When the mobster's nephew meets Kris, he hopes she can find the priceless diamond necklace the mobster gave to his wife the night of the murder. But when the ex-mobster starts to think Kris is actually his wife, and he reconstructs the last night he spent with Rosemary, she finds herself thinking she's going to be murdered like the original wife Rosemary was. Guest stars: Ramon Bieri, Robert Karnes, Barbara Tarbuck, and Michael Shannon. Note Cheryl Ladd doubles as Rosemary Garfield, the Prohibition-era flapper.
72	24	"Angels Remembered"	Kim Manners	Edward J. Lakso	May 16, 1979
On the three-year anniversary of working together, the Angels, Bosley and Charlie reminisce with scenes from past cases including, "Angels in Paradise", "Angels on Ice", "Angels in Vegas", "Antique Angels", "Angel on My Mind", "Angel in Love", "Circus of Terror", "Unidentified Flying Angels", "Mother Goose is Running for His Life", "Pom Pom Angels", "Magic Fire", and others. Cast: Final appearance of Kate Jackson as Sabrina Duncan.
