= List of Charlie's Angels episodes =

A list of episodes for Charlie's Angels (1976–1981).

== Series overview ==
Season	Episodes	Originally released		Rank	Rating
Season	Episodes	First released	Last released	Rank	Rating
Pilot	1	March 21, 1976		6	30.6 (Note: Telecast on The ABC Sunday Night Movie.)
1	22	September 22, 1976	May 4, 1977	5	25.8
2	26	September 14, 1977	May 10, 1978	4	24.4 (Note: Tied with 60 Minutes and All in the Family.)
3	24	September 13, 1978	May 16, 1979	12	24.4
4	26	September 12, 1979	May 7, 1980	20	20.9 (Note: Tied with Barney Miller.)
5	17	November 30, 1980	June 24, 1981	59	—N/a

== Episodes ==
=== Pilot (1976) ===
Title	Directed by	Written by	Original release date
"Charlie's Angels"	John Llewellyn Moxey	Ben Roberts & Ivan Goff	March 21, 1976
Charles "Charlie" Townsend's client wants to prove that a missing vineyard owner, Vince le Maire, was murdered by his second wife and his foreman. The Angels set up a sophisticated caper in which Kelly Garrett and Sabrina Duncan pose as the wealthy heiress and Jill Munroe as a dowdy secretary and backwoods gunslinger. Guest stars: Diana Muldaur, Bo Hopkins, Tommy Lee Jones, and Ken Sansom. Notes: Originally shown as a 90-minute pilot movie, but in syndication is shown as two separate episodes.

=== Season 1 (1976–77) ===
No. overall	No. in season	Title	Directed by	Written by	Original release date
1	1	"Hellride"	Richard Lang	Edward J. Lakso	September 22, 1976
2	2	"The Mexican Connection"	Allen Baron	Jack V. Fogarty	September 29, 1976
3	3	"Night of the Strangler"	Richard Lang	S : Glen Olson & Rod Baker; S/T : Pat Fiedler	October 13, 1976
4	4	"Angels in Chains"	Phil Bondelli	Robert Earll	October 20, 1976
5	5	"Target: Angels"	Richard Lang	David Levinson	October 27, 1976
6	6	"The Killing Kind"	Richard Benedict	Rick Husky	November 3, 1976
7	7	"To Kill an Angel"	Phil Bondelli	Rick Husky	November 10, 1976
8	8	"Lady Killer"	George McCowan	Sue Milburn	November 24, 1976
9	9	"Bullseye"	Daniel Haller	Jeff Myrow	December 1, 1976
10	10	"Consenting Adults"	George McCowan	Les Carter	December 8, 1976
11	11	"The Seance"	George W. Brooks (as George Brooks)	Robert C. Dennis	December 15, 1976
12	12	"Angels on Wheels"	Richard Benedict	T : Jack V. Fogarty & Rick Husky; S/T : Charles Sailor	December 22, 1976
13	13	"Angel Trap"	George McCowan	Edward J. Lakso (as Ed Lakso)	January 5, 1977
14	14	"The Big Tap-Out"	Georg Stanford Brown	Brian McKay	January 12, 1977
15	15	"Angels on a String"	Lawrence Doheny	Edward J. Lakso	January 19, 1977
16	16	"Dirty Business"	Bill Bixby	Edward J. Lakso	February 2, 1977
17	17	"The Vegas Connection"	George McCowan	John D. F. Black	February 9, 1977
18	18	"Terror on Ward One"	Bob Kelljan	Edward J. Lakso	February 16, 1977
19	19	"Dancing in the Dark"	Cliff Bole	Les Carter	February 23, 1977
20	20	"I Will Be Remembered"	Nicholas Sgarro	T : Melvin Levy; S : Richard Powell	March 9, 1977
21	21	"Angels at Sea"	Allen Baron	John D. F. Black	March 23, 1977
22	22	"The Blue Angels"	Georg Stanford Brown	T : Edward J. Lakso; S : Laurie Lakso Beasley	May 4, 1977

=== Season 2 (1977–78) ===
No. overall	No. in season	Title	Directed by	Written by	Original release date
23	1	"Angels in Paradise"	Charles S. Dubin	John D. F. Black	September 14, 1977
24	2	"Angels in Paradise"	Charles S. Dubin	John D. F. Black	September 14, 1977
25	3	"Angels on Ice"	Bob Kelljan	Rick Edelstein	September 21, 1977
26	4	"Angels on Ice"	Bob Kelljan	Rick Edelstein	September 21, 1977
27	5	"Pretty Angels All in a Row"	John D. F. Black	John D. F. Black	September 28, 1977
28	6	"Angel Flight"	Dennis Donnelly	Brian McKay	October 5, 1977
29	7	"Circus of Terror"	Allen Baron	Robert Janes	October 19, 1977
30	8	"Angel in Love"	Paul Stanley	Skip Webster & Jock Mackelvie	October 26, 1977
31	9	"Unidentified Flying Angels"	Allen Baron	Ronald Austin & James David Buchanan	November 2, 1977
32	10	"Angels on the Air"	George W. Brooks	William Froug	November 9, 1977
33	11	"Angel Baby"	Paul Stanley	T : John D. F. Black; S/T : George R. Hodges	November 16, 1977
34	12	"Angels in the Wings"	Dennis Donnelly	Edward J. Lakso	November 23, 1977
35	13	"Magic Fire"	Leon Carrere	Lee Sheldon	November 30, 1977
36	14	"Sammy Davis, Jr. Kidnap Caper"	Ronald Austin	Ron Friedman	December 7, 1977
37	15	"Angels on Horseback"	George W. Brooks	Edward J. Lakso	December 21, 1977
38	16	"Game, Set, Death"	Georg Stanford Brown	Worley Thorne	January 4, 1978
39	17	"Hours of Desperation"	Cliff Bole	Ray Brenner	January 11, 1978
40	18	"Diamond in the Rough"	Ronald Austin	T : Ronald Austin & James D. Buchanan; S/T : Brian McKay	January 18, 1978
41	19	"Angels in the Backfield"	Georg Stanford Brown	Edward J. Lakso	January 25, 1978
42	20	"The Sandcastle Murders"	George McCowan	T : Skip Webster & Jock Mackelvie and Ronald Austin & James D. Buchanan; S/T : Robert C. Dennis	February 1, 1978
43	21	"Angel Blues"	Georg Stanford Brown	Edward J. Lakso	February 8, 1978
44	22	"Mother Goose is Running for His Life"	George McCowan	T : Ronald Austin & James D. Buchanan; S/T : Del Reisman	February 15, 1978
45	23	"Little Angels of the Night"	Georg Stanford Brown	Mickey Rose	February 22, 1978
46	24	"The Jade Trap"	George McCowan	T : Lee Sheldon; S : Tom Lazarus	March 1, 1978
47	25	"Angels on the Run"	Bob Kelljan	T : Edward J. Lakso; S : Laurie Lakso	May 3, 1978
48	26	"Antique Angels"	Leon Carrere	T : Edward J. Lakso; S : Lee Travis	May 10, 1978

=== Season 3 (1978–79) ===
No. overall	No. in season	Title	Directed by	Written by	Original release date
49	1	"Angels in Vegas"	Bob Kelljan	Edward J. Lakso	September 13, 1978
50	2	"Angels in Vegas"	Bob Kelljan	Edward J. Lakso	September 13, 1978
51	3	"Angel Come Home"	Paul Stanley	Stephen Kandel (as Stephen Kandell)	September 20, 1978
52	4	"Angel on High"	Larry Doheny	Edward J. Lakso	September 27, 1978
53	5	"Angels in Springtime"	Larry Stewart	William Froug	October 11, 1978
54	6	"Winning Is for Losers"	Cliff Bole	Ray Brenner	October 18, 1978
55	7	"Haunted Angels"	Ronald Austin	Lee Sheldon	October 25, 1978
56	8	"Pom Pom Angels"	Cliff Bole	Richard Carr	November 1, 1978
57	9	"Angels Ahoy"	Allen Baron	Lee Sheldon	November 8, 1978
58	10	"Mother Angel"	Don Chaffey	Rift Fournier	November 15, 1978
59	11	"Angel on My Mind"	Curtis Harrington	Edward J. Lakso	November 22, 1978
60	12	"Angels Belong in Heaven"	Paul Stanley	Edward J. Lakso	December 6, 1978
61	13	"Angels in the Stretch"	Lawrence Doheny	Bob and Esther Mitchell	December 20, 1978
62	14	"Angels on Vacation"	Don Weis (as Don Weiss)	Edward J. Lakso	January 10, 1979
63	15	"Counterfeit Angels"	Georg Stanford Brown	Richard Carr	January 24, 1979
64	16	"Disco Angels"	Georg Stanford Brown	George Slavin	January 31, 1979
65	17	"Terror on Skis"	Don Chaffey	Edward J. Lakso	February 7, 1979
66	18	"Terror on Skis"	Don Chaffey	Edward J. Lakso	February 7, 1979
67	19	"Angel in a Box"	Curtis Harrington	Edward J. Lakso	February 14, 1979
68	20	"Teen Angels"	Allen Baron	T : Bob and Esther Mitchell; S : Laurie Lakso	February 28, 1979
69	21	"Marathon Angels"	Bob Kelljan	Edward J. Lakso	March 7, 1979
70	22	"Angels in Waiting"	Allen Baron	Edward J. Lakso	March 21, 1979
71	23	"Rosemary, For Remembrance"	Ronald Austin	Lee Sheldon	May 2, 1979
72	24	"Angels Remembered"	Kim Manners	Edward J. Lakso	May 16, 1979

=== Season 4 (1979–80) ===
No. overall	No. in season	Title	Directed by	Written by	Original release date
73	1	"Love Boat Angels"	Allen Baron	Edward J. Lakso	September 12, 1979
74	2	"Love Boat Angels"	Allen Baron	Edward J. Lakso	September 12, 1979
75	3	"Angels Go Truckin'"	Lawrence Dobkin	Richard Carr	September 19, 1979
76	4	"Avenging Angel"	Allen Baron	T : Edward J. Lakso; S : Laurie Lakso	September 26, 1979
77	5	"Angels at the Altar"	Lawrence Dobkin	Larry Alexander	October 3, 1979
78	6	"Fallen Angel"	Allen Baron	Kathryn Michaelian Powers	October 24, 1979
79	7	"Caged Angel"	Dennis Donnelly	B.W. Sandefur	October 31, 1979
80	8	"Angels on the Street"	Don Chaffey	T : Edward J. Lakso; S : Laurie Lakso	November 7, 1979
81	9	"The Prince and the Angel"	Cliff Bole	T : Edward J. Lakso; S : Laurie Lakso	November 14, 1979
82	10	"Angels on Skates"	Don Chaffey	T : Michael Michaelian (as Michael Michalian); S/T : John Francis Whelpley	November 21, 1979
83	11	"Angels on Campus"	Don Chaffey	Michael Michaelian	November 28, 1979
84	12	"Angel Hunt"	Paul Stanley	Lee Sheldon	December 5, 1979
85	13	"Cruising Angels"	George McCowan	B.W. Sandefur	December 12, 1979
86	14	"Of Ghosts and Angels"	Cliff Bole	Kathryn Michaelian Powers	January 2, 1980
87	15	"Angel's Child"	Dennis Donnelly	Edward J. Lakso	January 9, 1980
88	16	"One of Our Angels Is Missing"	Allen Baron	Robert S. Biheller & W. Dal Jenkins	January 16, 1980
89	17	"Catch a Falling Angel"	Kim Manners	Edward J. Lakso	January 23, 1980
90	18	"Homes $weet Homes"	Allen Baron	S : Robert E. Lee & Ronald E. Osborn; S/T : William Froug	January 30, 1980
91	19	"Dancin' Angels"	Dennis Donnelly	Edward J. Lakso	February 6, 1980
92	20	"Harrigan's Angel"	Don Chaffey	Edward J. Lakso	February 20, 1980
93	21	"An Angel's Trail"	Dennis Donnelly	Wayne Cruseturner	February 27, 1980
94	22	"Nips and Tucks"	Don Chaffey	S : Cory Applebaum; S/T : B.W. Sandefur	March 5, 1980
95	23	"Three for the Money"	George McCowan	Lee Sheldon	March 12, 1980
96	24	"Toni's Boys"	Ron Satlof	S : Robert Janes; S/T : Katharyn Powers	April 2, 1980
97	25	"One Love... Two Angels"	Dennis Donnelly	B.W. Sandefur	April 30, 1980
98	26	"One Love... Two Angels"	Dennis Donnelly	B.W. Sandefur	May 7, 1980

=== Season 5 (1980–81) ===
No. overall	No. in season	Title	Directed by	Written by	Original release date
99	1	"Angel in Hiding"	Dennis Donnelly	Edward J. Lakso	November 30, 1980
100	2	"Angel in Hiding"	Dennis Donnelly	Edward J. Lakso	November 30, 1980
101	3	"To See an Angel Die"	Dennis Donnelly	Edward J. Lakso	November 30, 1980
102	4	"Angels of the Deep"	Kim Manners	Robert George	December 7, 1980
103	5	"Island Angels"	Don Chaffey	T : Robert George; S : Robert I. Holt	December 14, 1980
104	6	"Waikiki Angels"	Dennis Donnelly	B.W. Sandefur	January 4, 1981
105	7	"Hula Angels"	Kim Manners	Robert George	January 11, 1981
106	8	"Moonshinin' Angels"	Kim Manners	B.W. Sandefur	January 24, 1981
107	9	"He Married an Angel"	Don Chaffey	Edward J. Lakso	January 31, 1981
108	10	"Taxi Angels"	John Peyser	Robert George	February 7, 1981
109	11	"Angel on the Line"	Kim Manners	Edward J. Lakso	February 14, 1981
110	12	"Chorus Line Angels"	David Doyle	Edward J. Lakso	February 21, 1981
111	13	"Stuntwomen Angels"	Dennis Donnelly	Edward J. Lakso	February 28, 1981
112	14	"Attack Angels"	Kim Manners	B.W. Sandefur	June 3, 1981
113	15	"Angel on a Roll"	Dennis Donnelly	Edward J. Lakso	June 10, 1981
114	16	"Mr. Galaxy"	Don Chaffey	T : Mickey Rich; S : Larry Mitchell & Robert Spears	June 17, 1981
115	17	"Let Our Angel Live"	Kim Manners	Edward J. Lakso	June 24, 1981
