= Charlie's Angels season 5 =

Charlie's Angels
- Season 5
- No. of episodes: 17

Release
- Original release: November 30, 1980 – June 24, 1981

Season chronology
- ← Previous; Season 4

This is a list of episodes for the fifth and final season of the TV series Charlie's Angels. Originally broadcast from November 30, 1980 to June 24, 1981 for a total of 17 episodes, the season starred Jaclyn Smith, Cheryl Ladd, David Doyle, and introduced Tanya Roberts as streetwise former model Julie Rogers, the only "angel" not to graduate from the Police Academy.

Since the show's fourth season, ratings were in decline. Producers believed that replacing Shelley Hack with a new "Angel" would improve viewing figures, but with this season's timeslot being continually changed during its run, ratings continued to fall. As a result of the scheduling, the show dropped to a lowly #59 in the Nielsen chart, leading ABC to cancel the series after the season concluded.

== Cast and characters ==
=== Main cast ===
- Jaclyn Smith as Kelly Garrett
- Cheryl Ladd as Kris Munroe
- Tanya Roberts as Julie Rogers
- David Doyle as John Bosley
- John Forsythe as Charles "Charlie" Townsend (voice)

=== Notable guest stars ===
- Jack Albertson
- Jane Wyman
- Soon-Tek Oh (4 episodes)
- Barbi Benton
- Richard Anderson
- Sally Kirkland
- Eric Braeden
- Barbara Luna
- Joyce Brothers
- Sonny Bono
- Christopher Lee
- Anne Francis
- Cameron Mitchell
- Randolph Mantooth

== Episodes ==
No. overall	No. in season	Title	Directed by	Written by	Original release date
99	1	"Angel in Hiding"	Dennis Donnelly	Edward J. Lakso	November 30, 1980
100	2	"Angel in Hiding"	Dennis Donnelly	Edward J. Lakso	November 30, 1980
With Tiffany having decided to stay east for a while, only two Angels remain. A model's father hires the Townsend Agency to find her, but when she turns up murdered, the Angels must go undercover as models for a modeling agency to find out why she was murdered and by whom. Meanwhile, the dead model's roommate is doing her own investigation. Guest stars: Jack Albertson, Vic Morrow, Christopher Lee, Dack Rambo, David Hurst, George Dickerson, and Don Stroud (uncredited). Notes: In syndication, this is split into two episodes. Both parts of "Angel in Hiding" and "To See an Angel Die" were originally shown as a three-hour season premiere titled "Street Models and Hawaiian Angels".
101	3	"To See an Angel Die"	Dennis Donnelly	Edward J. Lakso	November 30, 1980
Bosley and the Angels go to the Hawaiian branch of the Townsend agency. Whilst there, Kris is kidnapped by a man and his two children who believe she killed their wife and mother three years earlier. A psychic helps solve the case. Guest stars: Cameron Mitchell, Gary Frank, and Jane Wyman.
102	4	"Angels of the Deep"	Kim Manners	Robert George	December 7, 1980
Still on Hawaii, Julie has taken up scuba diving. Unbeknownst to her, her diving partner Bianca is looking for a sunken boatload of cannabis. Two other parties are involved: Marvin and Claude, a pair of leftover hippies who sunk the boat, and Tony Kramer and his goons, for whom the shipment was meant. When Marvin and Claude contact Tony's buyer, Bianca forces them to take her on as partner. Meanwhile, Julie and the other Angels have become targets without even knowing what the case is all about. Guest stars: Patti D'Arbanville, Antonio Fargas, Gary Lockwood, Sonny Bono, Moe Keale, Bradford Dillman, Anne Francis and Soon-Teck Oh.
103	5	"Island Angels"	Don Chaffey	T : Robert George; S : Robert I. Holt	December 14, 1980
Julie identifies a member of the Red Circle terrorist group arriving in Hawaii to attempt the assassination of diplomat Eric Nillson. The Angels and Lt. Torres soon become convinced the assassin was not working alone, and go undercover at the Club Aloha resort to find the killer's cohort. Bosley and Julie pose as a reporter and photographer, Kris works at the bar and Kelly assists Torres at the station. Guest stars: Richard Jaeckel, Barbi Benton, Lyle Waggoner, Don Knight, Keye Luke, Randolph Mantooth, Carol Lynley and Soon-Teck Oh.
104	6	"Waikiki Angels"	Dennis Donnelly	B.W. Sandefur	January 4, 1981
The Angels go undercover as lifeguards to investigate the disappearance of a congressman's daughter and catch three dune buggy drivers who are terrorizing a Hawaiian beach. Guest stars: Dan Haggerty, Patrick Wayne, Rex Holman, Denise DuBarry, Christopher Goutman, Richard Anderson, Edd Byrnes, Soon-Teck Oh, and Zulu (uncredited).
105	7	"Hula Angels"	Kim Manners	Robert George	January 11, 1981
Steve Moss is kidnapped outside his Hawaiian nightclub. His wife cannot come up with the ransom in time and hires the Angels. Each day Mrs. Moss keeps the kidnappers waiting, another dancing girl from the club disappears. Kris and Julie both audition to join the hula dancers while Kelly and Bos try to figure out why a successful club owner like Moss is lacking cash. Guest stars: Gene Barry, Branscombe Richmond, Pat Crowley, Joanna Cassidy, William Bryant, Elizabeth Lindsey, and Soon-Teck Oh.
106	8	"Moonshinin' Angels"	Kim Manners	B.W. Sandefur	January 24, 1981
The Angels, just back from Hawaii, are asked to find out why the old feud between two rival moonshiners in Gifford County is heating up again. Kris joins the Catlins as their new still master. Kelly becomes the Bartletts' new driver. Julie gets a job as a waitress at Etta's Diner. Bosley, posing as a rich Texan, offers both parties a deal to buy their liquor. Guest stars: Andrew Duggan, George Loros, Dennis Fimple, Miriam Byrd-Nethery, Dabbs Greer, Bob Lesser, and Barbara Lang.
107	9	"He Married an Angel"	Don Chaffey	Edward J. Lakso	January 31, 1981
The Angels are hired to catch a con man named John Thornwood. Kris poses as a fellow scam artist to get on his good side, while Kelly gets close to his latest victim, Monica Regis. Meanwhile, Julie finds out that Monica's father is a powerful mobster. The Angels decide to teach Thornwood a lesson he will never forget. Guest stars: David Hedison, Harold J. Stone, Eloise Hardt, and Sharon Johansen.
108	10	"Taxi Angels"	John Peyser	Robert George	February 7, 1981
Investigating a murder attempt at a small taxi cab company, Kelly reluctantly poses as a driver, Julie as the dispatcher and Kris as a roller-skating waitress at the local diner. Guest stars: Norman Alden, Sally Kirkland, Robert Costanzo, and Scott Brady.
109	11	"Angel on the Line"	Kim Manners	Edward J. Lakso	February 14, 1981
When the Angels investigate a murder at the dating establishment "The Hot Line Club", Kelly becomes the killer's next target. Guest stars: Tisha Sterling, Diane Mc Bain, Paul Cavonis, and Brad Maule.
110	12	"Chorus Line Angels"	David Doyle	Edward J. Lakso	February 21, 1981
When a group that is trying to put together a Vegas show is besieged by the disappearance of their choreographer and lead star, one of the investors turns to Charlie for help. Kelly is tapped by the director to replace the star without seeing her dance, which does not make the new choreographer happy, because Kelly has no experience. Guest stars: Michael Callan, Mark Slade, and Mary Doyle.
111	13	"Stuntwomen Angels"	Dennis Donnelly	Edward J. Lakso	February 28, 1981
A man dressed as an archer is causing accidents at Mammoth studios. The Angels go undercover as stunt women (after taking a crash course at Big Teddy's stunt school). The main target seems to be the stunt coordinator working on Lady West and Marian and her Merry Maidens, the latter being a remake of an Errol Flynn classic. Guest stars: Denny Miller, Pat Cooper, Gerald S. O'Loughlin, Tommy Reamon, and Tony Epper.
112	14	"Attack Angels"	Kim Manners	B.W. Sandefur	June 3, 1981
When the Angels investigate a couple of suspicious deaths at Western Techtronics, Julie falls under the trance of a hypnotist who specializes in using brainwashed young women as killers. Guest stars: Eric Braeden, Darleen Carr, David Sheiner, Brett Halsey, Norman Bartold, Dr. Joyce Brothers, and BarBara Luna.
113	15	"Angel on a Roll"	Dennis Donnelly	Edward J. Lakso	June 10, 1981
Ted Markham has opened 12 different bank accounts under different names and wearing disguises, only to rob their ATMs in one fell stroke. Kris volunteers to get close to Markham and let him "spend some of that money" on her in order to catch him. When Ted invites her to go to Vegas with him, Kris accepts and starts to grow fond of the charming thief. Meanwhile, an angry casino owner and his goon follow Markham and Kris, thinking they are a double act out to rob more casinos. Guest stars: Mark Pinter, Joseph Sirola, Robert Rockwell, Noah Keen, and Alvin Ing.
114	16	"Mr. Galaxy"	Don Chaffey	T : Mickey Rich; S : Larry Mitchell & Robert Spears	June 17, 1981
When several attempts are made on bodybuilder Ron Gates' life, the Angels are hired to investigate. Kris stays close to Ron and protects him from several more deadly traps. Kelly poses is a reporter from a bodybuilding magazine, Julie goes to work at the Mid-Valley Club, and Bosley starts working out there. Guest stars: Dick Bakalyan, Ric Drasin, Joseph Ruskin, Floyd Levine, Will MacMillan, and Allan Graf.
115	17	"Let Our Angel Live"	Kim Manners	Edward J. Lakso	June 24, 1981
Kelly is shot at point blank range by a suspect she had been watching during a stakeout. While Kelly's life hangs in the balance, a very emotional Bosley, Kris and Julie spend the night at the hospital reminiscing about past cases, including, "Terror on Ward One", "Angel in Hiding", "Terror on Skis", "Angel's Child", and "Avenging Angel". Charlie finally appears onscreen, albeit with his face hidden behind a surgical mask. Guest stars: Michael Whitney, Chris George, Cameron Mitchell, Vic Morrow, Simon Oakland, and Ray Vitte. Notes: A "Happily ever after" epilogue was planned to close this final episode, which would explain what the Angels, both present and past, as well as Bosley and Charlie, were doing nowadays, but it did not materialize.
