= Charlie's Angels season 1 =

Charlie's Angels
- Season 1
- No. of episodes: 22

Release
- Original release: September 22, 1976 – May 4, 1977

Season chronology
- Next → Season 2

This is a list of episodes for the first season of the 1970s television series, Charlie's Angels. Broadcast on the ABC network from September 22, 1976, to May 4, 1977 - with a total of 22 episodes - season one starred Kate Jackson, Farrah Fawcett-Majors, Jaclyn Smith and David Doyle. John Forsythe provided the voice of the character Charles "Charlie" Townsend.

The pilot film aired on March 21, 1976, as a 2-hour TV movie. Succeeding episodes were between 48 and 50 minutes in length. Viewing figures for the first season were extremely high, finishing at #5 in the Nielsen ratings.

The pilot episode featured M*A*S*H actor David Ogden Stiers as the character Scott Woodville, a male liaison to Charlie. Woodville was dropped for the series as it was felt the character was too severe and that it was unnecessary for Charlie to have two male liaisons. Fellow liaison Bosley (played by Doyle) was kept as someone the writers could use to add humor to the episodes.

The show's three female leads were launched to greater heights in their careers, with Fawcett-Majors proving to be the most popular of the trio. Although Jackson and Smith were overshadowed by Fawcett-Majors they have equally stood the test of time; both have also been cited as "fan favorites".

Note that the United States Copyright Office starts numbering the episodes with "Hellride", the first regular episode of season 1.

== Cast and characters ==
=== Main ===
- Kate Jackson as Sabrina Duncan
- Farrah Fawcett-Majors as Jill Munroe
- Jaclyn Smith as Kelly Garrett (regular) / Dana Cameron (episode: "Night of the Strangler")
- David Doyle as John Bosley
- John Forsythe as Charles "Charlie" Townsend (voice)

=== Notable guest stars ===
- Fernando Lamas
- Ida Lupino
- Dick Sargent
- Richard Mulligan
- Frank Gorshin
- Michael Bell
- Bo Hopkins
- Jenny O'Hara
- Anthony James
- Tom Selleck
- Kim Basinger as Linda Oliver
- Lauren Tewes
- Dirk Benedict

== Episodes ==
No. overall	No. in season	Title	Directed by	Written by	Original release date
1	1	"Hellride"	Richard Lang	Edward J. Lakso	September 22, 1976
Sabrina becomes a race car driver, John Bosley, a preacher and Jill, his daughter to learn why a pretty woman driver lost control of her car and died in a flaming wreck. Guest stars: Don Gordon, John Dennis Johnston, Jenny O'Hara, Ric Mancini, Norma Connolly, and Anne Ramsey.
2	2	"The Mexican Connection"	Allen Baron	Jack V. Fogarty	September 29, 1976
Charlie assigns the girls to find the saboteurs of a charter plane carrying a cache of heroin. Jill becomes a swimming instructor for the daughter of a wealthy Mexican businessman when they travel south of the border, their mission known only to the surviving pilot of the ill-fated flight. Guest stars: Cesare Danova and Elyssa Davalos.
3	3	"Night of the Strangler"	Richard Lang	S : Glen Olson & Rod Baker; S/T : Pat Fiedler	October 13, 1976
Charlie counts on Kelly's striking resemblance to a fashion model who was a victim in a series of rag doll stranglings. The wife of a well-known fashion designer is the next victim. Guest stars: Richard Mulligan, William Beckley, Alex Henteloff, and Rosemary Forsyth.
4	4	"Angels in Chains"	Phil Bondelli	Robert Earll	October 20, 1976
The Angels investigate a country prison farm and a nearby small-town sheriff. Sabrina, Kelly, and Jill deliberately get stopped for speeding; when the sheriff 'finds' drugs he has planted in their car, they are sentenced by a kangaroo court to unusually long terms at the nearby prison farm. Once there, they discover that the authorities are partners in an extortion-prostitution scheme. Young women without relatives are arrested and jailed on trumped-up violations. Guest stars: David Huddleston, Anthony James, Christina Hart, Mary Woronov, Kim Basinger, Neva Patterson, and Lauren Tewis.
5	5	"Target: Angels"	Richard Lang	David Levinson	October 27, 1976
An unknown assassin tries to kill Jill, Kelly and Sabrina. The pressure intensifies, forcing the girls to withdraw from their lives (such as Kelly breaking up with her boyfriend) and take the only sure refuge they know: Charlie's gated mansion. Their anticipation at the prospect of seeing Charlie for the first time dims when they suddenly realize they have led the killer to his real target — Charlie. Guest stars: Tom Selleck, Michael Bell, David Healy, John Agar, Irene Tedrow, and Thayer David. Filming dates: August 18–26, 1976
6	6	"The Killing Kind"	Richard Benedict	Rick Husky	November 3, 1976
Charlie calls on the Angels to solve the murder of the daughter of an old friend. In their quest to solve the killing, the three (Kelly posing as a magazine photographer, Jill as a tennis instructor and Sabrina as a guest) infiltrate an exclusive hotel-resort. They soon learn that the owner is an underworld figure who, after turning state's evidence and getting a new identity as part of the government's "witness relocation" program, has built a new criminal empire for himself. Guest stars: Robert Loggia, Joseph Ruskin, Hugh Gillin, Frank Maxwell, Judson Pratt, Nancy Stephens, Hal Needham and Lupe Ontiveros.
7	7	"To Kill an Angel"	Phil Bondelli	Rick Husky	November 10, 1976
Kelly takes Skip, an autistic little boy, on an outing to an amusement park. When away for a few moments, two hired killers bump into Skip after they have just murdered a man. One of the killers drops his gun near Skip, who accidentally shoots Kelly and runs away. Kelly is hospitalized with a minor head wound and Sabrina and Jill take up the search for Skip, trying to find his whereabouts using clues from his favorite nursery rhyme. The killers visit Kelly in the hospital and learn the clues as well, determined to silence Skip before the Angels can rescue him. Guest stars: Robert Donner, John Zaremba, Lee Bryant, Danny Dayton, and Michael Alldredge. Notes: This episode's plot is similar to that of "The Mod Squad" episode "Cricket". The girl who drives Skip to the beach wears a T-shirt sporting another Aaron Spelling-Leonard Goldberg production, "Starsky and Hutch". Because Spelling and Goldberg were executive producers of that series as well as "Charlie's Angels", they were given the rights to use the T-shirt.
8	8	"Lady Killer"	George McCowan	Sue Milburn	November 24, 1976
Jill becomes a candidate for the centerfold of Feline Magazine, hoping to tempt the hand of the murderer of two previous models. There are many suspects on the magazine's staff and the infighting is so intense that attempts on the lives of undercover employees Kelly and Sabrina further cloud the investigation, including a water bed wired to electrocute Sabrina. Guest stars: Hugh O'Brian, Alan Fudge, Richard Foronjy, Jan Shutan, Martha Smith, and Denise Gordy.
9	9	"Bullseye"	Daniel Haller	Jeff Myrow	December 1, 1976
A recruit in the Women's Army Corps is shot to death on the firing range and the Angels are assigned to investigate. Bosley works undercover as a civilian researcher with Sabrina as an Army nurse and Jill and Kelly as new enlistees. A military physician and a cruel drill instructor are discovered to be purchasing large quantities of cheap, inactive drugs and reselling them to the Army at top quality retail prices. Guest stars: L. Q. Jones, Robert Pine, Marla Pennington, Peter Leeds, Nora Marlowe, and Jeanne Bates.
10	10	"Consenting Adults"	George McCowan	Les Carter	December 8, 1976
A prostitute supplied by a computer dating service keeps an antique dealer preoccupied while his store is burgled of priceless art objects. One of the stolen items is stuffed with smuggled diamonds belonging to a ruthless crime syndicate boss. Enraged, the kingpin kidnaps the antique dealer and the Angels enter the case. Jill infiltrates the dating service posing as a hooker, but finds that the prostitute has led the crime boss to the diamonds. In a last-ditch effort, the Angels steal the crime boss's championship racehorse and he agrees to turn over the diamonds in exchange for his horse. Guest stars: Audrey Christie, Laurette Spang, Ward Wood, G. W. Bailey, and Randy Stone.
11	11	"The Seance"	George W. Brooks (as George Brooks)	Robert C. Dennis	December 15, 1976
A rich widow hires the Angels to solve the mystery of the repeated disappearances of her jewelry. When they learn the lady manages her affairs through a medium, they track down prime suspect, Madame Dorian. Kelly assumes the identity of a rich Texas widow, Jill becomes her friend, and Bosley, their French chauffeur. Unbeknownst to the others, Madame Dorian's male assistant hypnotizes Kelly to get financial information from her. Guest stars: Rene Auberjonois, Carole Cook, George Wyner, Nancy Cameron, Gertrude Flynn, and Tonya Crowe (uncredited).
12	12	"Angels on Wheels"	Richard Benedict	T : Jack V. Fogarty & Rick Husky; S/T : Charles Sailor	December 22, 1976
Jill becomes the star of a roller derby team when she goes undercover to investigate the mysterious death of skating champ Karen Jason, who is killed after being forced over the guardrail and into the audience during a rough and tumble race. Charlie's client believes Karen was murdered, despite the police report stating that the death was accidental. In search of clues, Sabrina poses as a state insurance investigator, Kelly as a pushy writer for a national magazine and Jill romances the team owner. Guest stars: Andra Akers, Steve Sandor, William Benedict, Dick Sargent, and Richard Rossi (uncredited).
13	13	"Angel Trap"	George McCowan	Edward J. Lakso (as Ed Lakso)	January 5, 1977
Jericho, a paradoxically gentle man who was a World War II French Underground assassin, is the prime suspect when a former member of his old liberationist team is killed. From Jericho's ex-girlfriend, the Angels learn that he intends to eliminate all of the members of his old French Underground team. In an attempt to capture Jericho before he can carry out his plans, Sabrina poses as the girlfriend of Kamden, the next likely victim, and Jill sets up an "accidental" meeting with Jericho. Jill soon finds it difficult to keep her mind on the job as she becomes emotionally involved with the romantic killer. Guest stars: Fernando Lamas, Phyllis Avery, and John Larch. Filming dates: October 29-November 9, 1976 Production code: H-12
14	14	"The Big Tap-Out"	Georg Stanford Brown	Brian McKay	January 12, 1977
When notorious gambler-thief Roy David is suspected of burglarizing a securities company of $40,000, the Angels are called into the case to convict him of the crime. Sabrina and Bosley dupe the gambler into betting nearly half of the loot on a losing horse at the racetrack. Jill then tricks him into losing his remaining money at the gambling tables. With David penniless and desperate, the Angels make it easy for him to follow his usual burglary pattern. In front of startled eyes, they stage a hit-and-run accident in which Jill is apparently killed with detailed floor plans and safe combinations to the casino in her possession. David steals the plans and immediately sets up a burglary. Guest stars: Richard Romanus, Tony Giorgio, Bert Remsen, Norman Bartold, Jerry Ayres, and Don Wilbanks.
15	15	"Angels on a String"	Lawrence Doheny	Edward J. Lakso	January 19, 1977
An international political leader is abducted and a double substituted for him at a world conference being held at a resort where the Angels are vacationing. Having met the leader earlier, Sabrina knows something is wrong. Soon, the girls discover that the culprits plan to have their impostor deliver a false, radicalized, seemingly irrational keynote address. Guest stars: Theodore Bikel, Charles Cyphers, Albert Paulsen, Jason Wingreen, Nancy Steen, Earl Montgomery and Jack Smith.
16	16	"Dirty Business"	Bill Bixby	Edward J. Lakso	February 2, 1977
A legitimate business is targeted for arson and the Angels are called in to investigate. Soon, they discover that the corporation is actually a front for a pornographic film studio-and that the studio films the after-hour activities of wealthy people and then blackmails them into investing. As the scheme becomes apparent, the Angels discover something worse than simple pornography: the pornographic film, Sally in Sin City, shows proof of someone being where he should not be. Guest stars: Alan Feinstein, Sidney Clute, Eda Reiss Merin, Warren Berlinger, Bruce M. Fischer, Dolores Dorn, William O'Connell and Larry Anderson.
17	17	"The Vegas Connection"	George McCowan	John D. F. Black	February 9, 1977
Cass Harper assures young girls of a lucrative job in a Las Vegas nightclub chorus line, in exchange for sideline prostitution. Since many chorus girls end up marrying wealthy gamblers, his con scheme works extremely well at both ends. When any of his showgirl-prostitutes marry into wealth, Harper blackmails them with photographs of their past exploits. That is, until one of his blackmail victims hire the Angels to put a stop to his setup. Jill and Kelly become aspiring showgirls for the investigation and Bosley poses as a high-rolling spender looking for a good time. Guest stars: Michael Callan, Brooke Bundy, Walter Mathews, Carla Borelli, Blackie Dammett, Sharon Weber, and Tucker Smith (uncredited).
18	18	"Terror on Ward One"	Bob Kelljan	Edward J. Lakso	February 16, 1977
Jill and Kelly pose as student nurses at the hospital and Sabrina as a local writer preparing a story on a mysterious attacker in a hospital. Bosley is admitted as a surgical patient. All clues begin to point to the chief surgeon cited in the malpractice suit in which a man died, who displays erratic behavior due to his excessive use of amphetamines. Then the Angels learn another staffer is the son of the man who died in the malpractice suit. Guest stars: Jack Bannon, Michael McGreevey, Fran Ryan, Arch Johnson, Ray Vitte, Richard Derr, and Eddie Garrett (uncredited), and Arthur Tovey (uncredited).
19	19	"Dancing in the Dark"	Cliff Bole	Les Carter	February 23, 1977
A lonely widow is blackmailed after a short affair with a gigolo she met at her dance classes. Jill masquerades as a disco-dance instructor, Sabrina as a rich but socially inept heiress and Kelly as a replacement photographer, supposedly sent by the blackmailer's shutterbug. When Sabrina pretends to succumb to the gigolo's charms, Kelly photographs the compromising position and Bosley then shows up as the irate but blackmailed father. Guest stars: John vanDreelen, Logan Ramsey, Jean Allison, Benny Baker and Dennis Cole.
20	20	"I Will Be Remembered"	Nicholas Sgarro	T : Melvin Levy; S : Richard Powell	March 9, 1977
Aging actress Gloria Gibson seems to be losing her mind, reliving the death scenes from her old movies. Kelly gets a job as an extra in Miss Gibson's "comeback" film, Sabrina poses as the leading lady's secretary, and Jill pretends to be a magazine writer, covering the picture. Several attempts are made to kill the actress and the girls during the filming. Guest stars: Ida Lupino, Alfred Ryder, Wynn Irwin, Louie Guss, Richard Libertini, Aharon Ipalé, and Ray Middleton.
21	21	"Angels at Sea"	Allen Baron	John D. F. Black	March 23, 1977
In a series of "accidents" aboard a cruise ship, a young couple is murdered. The Angels take a trip to Hawaii to investigate for the ship's owner, who is on the verge of bankruptcy. Guest stars: Frank Gorshin, John Myhers, David Watson, Harold J. Stone, Michael Irving, and Meg Wyllie.
22	22	"The Blue Angels"	Georg Stanford Brown	T : Edward J. Lakso; S : Laurie Lakso Beasley	May 4, 1977
When two men are found dead in a massage parlor, the Angels are called in to investigate the policeman who reported the crime. Sabrina goes undercover on the vice squad as an assistant to the officer who is suspected of extorting money from massage parlor owners. Kelly signs up for the police academy to locate two suspicious recruits and Jill reopens the massage parlor where the murders took place. The officer-suspect calls on Jill to extort money but their cover is blown up by Sabrina's ex-husband. This was Farrah Fawcett-Majors' last episode as a regular. Guest stars: Dirk Benedict, Tom Ligon, Timothy Carey, Michael Bell, Joanne Kerns, Ed Lauter, Stanley Brock, and Marilyn Joi.
