= Mark Pinkosh =

American actor

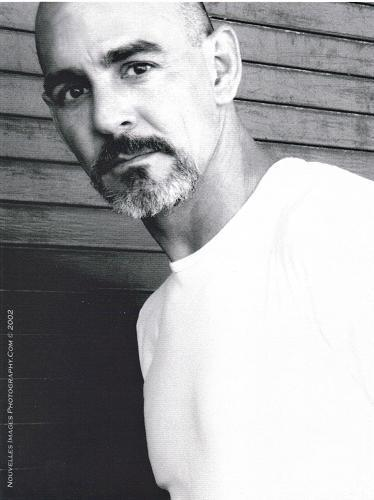
- Born: Frankfurt, Germany

Mark Pinkosh is an actor. In 1984 Mark founded the Starving Artists Theatre Company.

== Early life ==
Pinkosh was born in Frankfurt, Germany, to a Polish-American father and a Scottish-American mother. The family moved to Kailua, Hawaii when Mark was 7 years old.

== Career ==
Starting in film and television at age 9, Mark did a number of local television commercials in Hawaii and worked as a background actor in shows like Hawaii 5-0, Charlie's Angels, The Rockford Files, The Jeffersons, Magnum P.I., and Eight Is Enough. By age 12 he was performing regularly on the stage, and was awarded the Presidential Scholar In The Arts by President Reagan in 1982. That same year he was flown to Washington D.C. where he was presented with the honor and performed at the Kennedy Center.

In 1984, Mark founded the Starving Artists Theatre Company, an international theatre group known for presenting cutting edge drama around the world. As Managing Director and Artistic Director, Mark produced over sixty productions and directed twelve pieces for the company. Their pieces were invited to represent the United States at a number of high-profile International Theatre Festivals, including Toronto's duMaurier World Stage International Festival, Dublin's World Stage Festival, Philadelphia's Fringe Festival and the Edinburgh International Festival. Their work has transferred to London's West End and Chicago, San Francisco, Houston, Munich, Paris and Seattle.

Awards and Honors: As an adult, Mark was recognized as one of the outstanding stage performers in the United Kingdom. He has been awarded the Manchester Evening News Award for Best Actor of the Year. He was awarded the first ever London Stage award for Outstanding Actor at the Edinburgh Festival in 1995 and two Po'okela Awards for his stage work in Honolulu.

Mark had appeared in a variety of television and film roles. Films include: Fifty First Dates, The Mod Squad, Underclassmen, Man In The Moon, Take Me With You.

Television includes: Hawaii Five-O, Magnum, P.I., Jake and the Fatman, In-Laws, I’m With Her and Alias.

== Personal life ==
In February 2007 Mark was legally married in the United Kingdom to long term partner, playwright Godfrey Hamilton.

He currently divides his time between Los Angeles, Hawaii and the United Kingdom.
