= Tom Spratley =

American film and television actor

- Born: Thomas Reay Spratley; April 11, 1914; Caldwell, New Jersey, U.S.
- Died: June 10, 1987 (aged 73); Encino, California, U.S.
- Occupation: Actor
- Years active: 1965–1987

Thomas Reay Spratley (April 11, 1914 – June 10, 1987) was an American film and television actor. He was best known for playing Curly Jackson in the 1973 film The Sting. He also played the role of Mr. Connell in the 1974 film Where the Lilies Bloom. He played the role of a card player in the 1975 film The Sunshine Boys.

== Life and career ==
Born in Caldwell, New Jersey, Spratley was raised in East Orange, New Jersey, where he lived until relocating to California in the 1960s.

Spratley appeared in films, such as, Ferris Bueller's Day Off, City Heat, The Stepford Wives, Protocol, The Man with Two Brains, Cockfighter and The Hitcher. His final film credit was from 1986 film Deadly Friend, where he played the role of a neighbor. His television credits includes, Too Close for Comfort, Dynasty, Charlie's Angels, Lou Grant and Highway to Heaven. He played the role of "Fred Sanders" in the soap opera television series The Doctors. Spratley died in June 1987 in Encino, California, at the age of 74.
