= Katharyn Powers =

American screenwriter (1943–2024)

Katharyn Michaelian Powers
- Lorna Theresa Patton
- Born: July 23, 1943
- Died: December 10, 2024 (aged 81)
- Citizenship: United States (American)
- Education: Beverly Hills High School: Graduated in 1960 Santa Monica College: Studied theatre under Bert Holland
- Occupations: Television writer, producer, and story editor

Katharyn Michaelian Powers (July 23, 1943 – December 10, 2024) was a television writer who wrote for several television series from the 1970s through early 2000s. Among the series she wrote episodes for are Charlie's Angels, Fantasy Island, Airwolf and Stargate SG-1. She was the story editor for Falcon Crest, Fantasy Island and The Fitzpatricks. She was credited as an "executive story consultant" for Stargate SG-1 during its first season.

== Personal life ==
Katharyn Powers was born Lorna Theresa Patton in Los Angeles, California on July 23, 1943. Her mother, Miriam Aulman, was sixteen years old; her father is still unknown. She graduated from Beverly Hills High School in 1960, and went on to study theatre with television actor Bert Holland at Santa Monica College. In 1962, she married stage actor Terry Boole. The two had one daughter, Alexandra Powers, in 1967, but divorced shortly thereafter. In 1969, she married Michael Michaelian. The two had one daughter, Nicole Powers (Nicole Montgomery), in 1970. In 1979, she married actor and model Dana Reno Andrews after having divorced Michaelian. The two had one daughter, Sterling Powers, in 1979, and wrote one episode of The Fitzpatricks together before divorcing in 1984.

== List of episodes written by Powers ==
- "Code of Honor" (Star Trek: The Next Generation) (with Michael Baron)
- "Past Prologue" (Star Trek: Deep Space Nine)
- "Emancipation" (Stargate SG-1)
- "Brief Candle" (Stargate SG-1)
- "Thor's Hammer" (Stargate SG-1)
- "Fire and Water" (Stargate SG-1)
- "Enigma" (Stargate SG-1)
- "Thor's Chariot" (Stargate SG-1)
- "Family" (Stargate SG-1)
- "Serpent's Song" (Stargate SG-1)
- "Pretense" (Stargate SG-1)
- "Crossroads" (Stargate SG-1)
- "Smoke & Mirrors" (Stargate SG-1) [story]
- "Jennie" (Airwolf)
- "Swamp Molly" (The Dukes of Hazzard)
- "The Brujo" (Kung Fu)
- "The Arrogant Dragon" (Kung Fu)
- "This Valley of Terror" (Kung Fu)
- "The Devil's Champion" (Kung Fu)
- unknown episodes The New Land
- "The Visit" (Sara)
- The Missing are Deadly (U.S. 1975 TV movie)
- "Death Mask" (Khan!)
- "Death Ride" (Petrocelli)
- "Chain of Command" (Petrocelli)
- "The Pay Off (Petrocelli)
- "The Cheese Sisters" (Young Pioneers)
- "Sweetwater" (The Young Pioneers)
- "Pilot" (How the West Was Won)
- "Erika" (How the West Was Won)
- "Bowie John Christie" (How the West Was Won)
- "Buffalo Story" (How the West Was Won)
- "Mormon Story" (How the West Was Won)
- "Interlude" (How the West Was Won)
- "Orville Gant" (How the West Was Won)
- "Formicida" (Wonder Woman)
- The Kid from Left Field (1979 remake)
- "Fallen Angel" (Charlie's Angels)
- "Of Ghosts and Angels" (Charlie's Angels)
- "Toni's Boys" (Charlie's Angels)
- "Tony Comes Home" (Falcon Crest)
- "Dark Journey" (Falcon Crest)
- "Everybody Goes to Gilley's/Face of Fire" (Fantasy Island)
- "Naughty Marietta/The Winning Ticket" (Fantasy Island)
- "Eternal Flame/A Date with Burt" (Fantasy Island)
- "Futurepast" (Logan's Run)
