= Del Reisman =

American screenwriter

Del Reisman (April 13, 1924 – January 8, 2011) was an American television producer, story editor and screenwriter whose lengthy credits included The Twilight Zone and The Untouchables.

Del Reisman was raised in Los Angeles. He received a bachelor's degree in English and journalism from the University of California, Berkeley. He joined the United States Army Air Forces during World War II and served as a bombardier on board a B-17 in the European theater from 1942 to 1945. He achieved the rank of first lieutenant.

Reisman began his career in television on the 1950s shows, Playhouse 90 and Matinee Theater, which were both anthology series broadcast live. He collaborated closely with Rod Serling on The Twilight Zone, which aired from 1959 until 1964, as the series' story editor.

His additional production and screenwriting credits included The Lieutenant, Peyton Place, The Streets of San Francisco, The Six Million Dollar Man, Flamingo Road, and Airwolf. Reisman taught courses on screenwriting at the American Film Institute later in his career. He was also a member of the National Film Preservation Board at the Library of Congress.

Reisman served as the President of the Writers Guild of America, West from 1991 to 1993. He also served on the board of directors of the Writers Guild of America from 1979 until 1987 and was the Vice President of the Writers Guild of America, West from 1987 until 1991. Reisman chaired three WGA Negotiating Committees during contract talks.

Del Reisman died of a heart attack in Toluca Lake, Los Angeles on January 8, 2011, at the age of 86.
