= Sidney Clute =

American film and television actor

- Clute in Perry Mason, 1958
- Born: Sidney Richard Clute; April 21, 1916; Brooklyn, New York, U.S.
- Died: October 2, 1985 (aged 69); Los Angeles, California, U.S.
- Occupation: Actor
- Years active: 1946–1985

Sidney Richard Clute (April 21, 1916 – October 2, 1985) was an American film and television actor. He was best known for playing Detective Paul La Guardia in the American police procedural drama Cagney & Lacey (1982–85). He also played Detective Simms in 10 episodes of McCloud.

Clute guest-starred in numerous television programs including Hawaii Five-O, Emergency!, The Rockford Files, Kolchak: The Night Stalker, All in the Family, Adam-12 and The Mary Tyler Moore Show. He also appeared in a few episodes of Lou Grant, Wagon Train, Hogan's Heroes, My Three Sons and Cannon.

Clute died on October 2, 1985, of cancer at the St. George Hospital in Los Angeles, California, at the age of 69.
