= Paul Stanley (director) =

American film director

Paul Stanley (1922, Hartford, Connecticut - 2002) was an American television director.

== Career ==
Stanley worked in television from the early 1950s until the mid-1980s. His credits encompass all genres, extending to more than fifty prime time television series of the period, from Have Gun – Will Travel in 1957 to Charlie's Angels in the late 1970s, to MacGyver in 1985.

Stanley also received producer credit on a handful of TV series episodes in the 1960s and 1970s.

== Television series credits (partial list) ==
- Appointment with Adventure (1955–1956)
- Goodyear Playhouse (1956–1957)
- Have Gun – Will Travel (1959)
- The Third Man (1959)
- Outlaws (1961)
- Dr. Kildare (1962)
- The Untouchables (1962)
- Combat! (1963)
- The Outer Limits (1964)
- Insight (1964–1980)
- Lost in Space (1965)
- Laredo (1965–1966)
- The Virginian (1965–1966)
- The Rat Patrol (1967)
- Mission: Impossible (1967–1968)
- Hawaii Five-O (1969–1977)
- Gunsmoke (1971–1972)
- Medical Center (1971–1975)
- Kojak (TV Series) (1973)
- The Streets of San Francisco (1974–1976)
- Baretta (1976–1978)
- The Six Million Dollar Man (1977)
- Charlie's Angels (1977–1979)
- The Love Boat (1978)
- Dallas (1978)
- Vega$ (1978–1979)
- Flamingo Road (1981)
- Lou Grant (1981–1982)
- Knight Rider (1982)
- The Fall Guy (1982–1983)
- The New Mike Hammer (1984)
- MacGyver (1985)
- William Tell (aka Crossbow) (1987)

== Feature film credits ==
- Cry Tough (1959)
- Mission Impossible Versus the Mob (1969), consisting of a compilation of a two-part episode of the original 1967 series titled "The Council"
- Three Guns for Texas (1968) — one segment re-edited from the TV series Laredo
- Sole Survivor (1970)
- Cotter (1973)
- Moby Dick (1978)
