= George McCowan =

Canadian director (1927–1995)

- Born: June 27, 1927; Canada
- Died: November 1, 1995 (aged 68); Santa Monica, California, U.S.
- Occupation: Director

George McCowan (June 27, 1927 – November 1, 1995) was a Canadian film and television director in the 1960s, 1970s and 1980s.

McCowan began his career working for the Canadian Broadcasting Corporation. He worked as an actor and director for several seasons at the Stratford Festival, and moved to the United States in 1967.

He took his name off the 1970 television war movie The Challenge; it was credited to Alan Smithee, the pseudonym coined by the Directors Guild of America. Among McCowan's other credits are the 1970 TV-movie Carter's Army, the 1971 Canadian hockey film Face-Off, the fourth and final Magnificent Seven film, The Magnificent Seven Ride! in 1972, the cult horror film Frogs in the same year, the 1976 film Shadow of the Hawk, and the 1979 film H. G. Wells' The Shape of Things to Come.

He directed episodes of Charlie's Angels, S.W.A.T., and Starsky and Hutch. He also worked on such shows as The Silent Force, The Mod Squad, The Streets of San Francisco, Fantasy Island, Hart to Hart, and Nero Wolfe.

He returned to Canada for Seeing Things (1981-1987), the popular Canadian series about a hapless reporter with clairvoyant powers, who stumbles into mysteries and solves them. McCowan directed all 43 episodes.

George McCowan died of emphysema on November 1, 1995, in Santa Monica, California.
