= Paul Cavonis =

American actor

Paul Cavonis (born December 4, 1937) is an American actor who has appeared in over 30 movies and television series. Cavonis is known for playing mafia and Greek characters.

== Early life ==
Cavonis was born in the Hells Kitchen section of Manhattan in New York City. He is of Greek ancestry. He was drafted and served in the United States Army in the period between the Korean War and the full-scale escalation of the Vietnam War. Cavonis has said jokingly about his service in the Army that, “Not one Viet Cong soldier invaded Hawaii on my watch.”

== Career 1970s ==
Cavonis's first TV appearance was as Mickey in the 1972 made-for-TV movie The Living End starring Lou Gossett Jr. He next appeared as Rick Niels in the award nominated made-for-TV movie Short Walk to Daylight alongside James Brolin. Throughout the 1970s Cavonis made appearances in The Brady Bunch, The Six Million Dollar Man, S.W.A.T., Kojak, The F.B.I., Banacek, The Bionic Woman, Baretta, The Rockford Files, Police Story, and Rhoda. Cavonis had a recurring role on The Streets of San Francisco, multiple roles in Charlie's Angels and M*A*S*H, and appeared in the episodes "The City" and "A Hand For Sonny Blue" from the 1977 series Quinn Martin's Tales of the Unexpected (known in the United Kingdom as Twist in the Tale).

== Career 1980s ==
Cavonis made appearances on The Greatest American Hero, Fantasy Island, The Fall Guy, Matt Houston, T. J. Hooker, and Dynasty.

== Career 1990s ==
Cavonis made a cameo in Pablo Ferro's 1992 JoBeth Williams-George Segal romantic comedy Me, Myself & I.

== Retirement ==
Cavonis is retired and is now the mayor of a retirement community in the Wine Country near north San Diego County in Southern California.
