= Lee Delano =

American actor

- Born: January 19, 1931
- Died: October 8, 2017 (aged 86)
- Occupation: Actor
- Years active: 1963–1997

Lee Delano (January 19, 1931 – October 8, 2017) was an American character actor.

== Career ==
Delano was born in New York City. He graduated from the Neighborhood Playhouse School of the Theatre, where he studied with Sandy Meisner for acting and Martha Graham for dance. His classmates included Joanne Woodward, Susan Oliver and Steve McQueen. McQueen convinced Delano to make the move west to Hollywood where he began to obtain guest roles in episodes of numerous television series, including the original Star Trek in "A Piece of the Action". Delano's tough guy looks and legitimate stage training made him a natural for 'cops and crooks' roles.

In 1968, Sid Caesar hired Delano to replace his longtime improvisational co-star Carl Reiner. Delano co-starred with Caesar on-stage and television around the world, including appearances at the Kraft Music Hall in London, Hollywood Palace, the Kennedy Center in Washington, D.C., and theaters and concert halls throughout the United States. These engagements included a four-month stint with Caesar and Imogene Coca at Michael's Pub Cabaret, and a run on Broadway.

Delano entered film in 1968, playing Dr. Tony Verity in Project X. An association with Mel Brooks led to roles in the films High Anxiety (as an orderly with half a mustache) and Silent Movie. He also appeared in dramatic roles in Report to the Commissioner and Executive Action, in which he played one of three assassins of President John F. Kennedy.

Delano co-founded the Oxford Theater with Jack Donner in Los Angeles. Their students included Barry Levinson, Craig T. Nelson, Barbara Parkins, and Don Johnson.

== Filmography ==
Year	Title	Role	Notes
1968	Project X	Dr. Tony Verity	
1968	Rogue's Gallery	Swen	
1968	Star Trek	Kalo	Episode: "A Piece of the Action"
1971	The Late Liz	Joe Vito	
1973	Executive Action	Team A Gunman	
1973	The Don Is Dead	Sam Zutti	Uncredited
1975	Report to the Commissioner	Detective	
1976	Silent Movie	Executive	
1977	High Anxiety	Norton	
1981	History of the World, Part I	Wagon Driver	
1984	Splash	Sergeant Leleandowski	
1985	They Call Me Bruce?	Polish Boss	
1996	The Birdcage	Mr. Boyington	
1997	Me and the Gods		
