= Edward J. Lakso =

American screenwriter, producer and composer

Edward Joseph Lakso
- Born: September 20, 1932; San Francisco, California
- Died: May 23, 2009 (aged 76); Beverly Hills, California, United States
- Occupations: Screenwriter, composer, producer
- Years active: 1959–1986
- Organization(s): Writers Guild of America West, ASCAP
- Spouse(s): Ruth Louise Laird (1953–1963; divorced); Diane H. Haggin (1967–1975; divorced); Linda Rouse A.K.A. Lee Travis Lakso (1985 to 2009; his death)

Edward Joseph Lakso (September 20, 1932 – May 23, 2009) was an American screenwriter, producer, and composer, known for his work on series such as Star Trek, Planet of the Apes, Charlie's Angels and Combat!. He is sometimes miscredited as Edward J. Lasko.

== Life and career ==
Lakso graduated from UCLA with a degree in music and taught briefly in the Los Angeles school district. While attending UCLA, he wrote the screenplay for Operation Dames, a Korean War drama about a USO troop trapped behind enemy lines shot in Topanga Canyon, California.

By his early 20's, he was already a small-town star, after high school and college productions gave a hint of his talent and, in 1959, when his film "Road Racers" was shown at the State Theatre over a series of days.

While serving in the United States Air Force he wrote a musical with Tommy Oliver called "When you Walked In." (they would later work again on Watergate: the Musical). During Ed's last year in the Air Force, he began writing the 2-Act musical comedy "Renee" which was set in Paris, France. It was named after his mother, whose middle name was "Renee."

Lakso co-wrote and scored The Immoral Mr. Teas, an early film by Russ Meyer, and scripted several other films, including The Broken Land (1962; the screen debut for Jack Nicholson), Gentle Giant (1967), and the blaxploitation film Brother on the Run (1973), which he co-directed with Herbert Stock.

Lakso is best known for his television work, writing Combat!, Star Trek, Planet of the Apes, Charlie's Angels, The Rockford Files, Name of the Game, Starsky & Hutch, Airwolf, The Fall Guy, and Hawaii Five-O. He composed music for Charlie's Angels and Dr. Kildare. He was the line producer Charlie's Angels episodic television show, .

Lakso also wrote, produced and directed several musicals. In 1967, he spent a summer in West Yellowstone, writing and producing a melodrama at the Golden Garter Theatre. Later, Tom Piper, for which he wrote the book, music and lyrics was produced at the Goodspeed Opera House in East Haddam, Connecticut, and starred Harve Presnell, Watergate, the Musical written and produced with Tommy Oliver at the Alliance Theater in Atlanta Georgia which starred Gene Barry; and Vincent, the Musical staged at the Las Palmas theater in Hollywood with his wife, Lee Travis, who co-produced and designed the costumes.

In 1972, he wrote, directed and produced a film about race car driver Richard Petty, 43 - The Petty Story. It was his first turn at directing a film.

== Family ==
Lakso and his first wife, Ruth Louise (Laird) Lakso, married in 1953 and divorced in 1961. Together they had 2 children. In 1985 he married actress Lee Travis. They were married until his death on May 23, 2009, at home in Beverly Hills California.
