= Charlie's Angels =

American crime drama television series (1976–1981)

- Genre: Action; Crime; Drama; Mystery
- Created by: Ivan Goff; Ben Roberts
- Starring: Kate Jackson; Farrah Fawcett; Jaclyn Smith; Cheryl Ladd; Shelley Hack; Tanya Roberts; David Doyle
- Theme music composer: Jack Elliott; Allyn Ferguson
- Country of origin: United States
- Original language: English
- No. of seasons: 5
- No. of episodes: 115 (list of episodes)

Production
- Executive producers: Aaron Spelling; Leonard Goldberg
- Running time: 48–50 minutes
- Production company: Spelling-Goldberg Productions

Original release
- Network: ABC
- Release: September 22, 1976 – June 24, 1981

Related
- Charlie's Angels (reboot series)

Charlie's Angels is an American crime drama television series created by Ivan Goff and Ben Roberts for ABC. It originally aired from September 22, 1976, to June 24, 1981, airing for five seasons consisting of 115 episodes. It was produced by Spelling-Goldberg Productions. The show follows the crime-fighting adventures of three women working at a private detective agency in Los Angeles, California, and originally starred Kate Jackson, Farrah Fawcett, and Jaclyn Smith in the leading roles and John Forsythe providing the voice of their boss, the unseen Charlie Townsend, who directed the crime-fighting operations of the "Angels" over a speakerphone. There were a few casting changes: after the departure of Fawcett at the end of season 1, Cheryl Ladd joined in season 2 and remained on the show until its end. When Jackson departed at the end of season 3, Shelley Hack joined for season 4, and she was subsequently replaced by Tanya Roberts in season 5. Of all the actresses who played the “Angels”, only Jaclyn Smith appeared in every episode of the series.

Despite mixed reviews from critics and a reputation for merely being "jiggle television" that emphasized the sex appeal of the female leads, Charlie's Angels was a top ten hit in the Nielsen ratings for its first two seasons. After the third season, however, the show had fallen from the top 10, and by the fifth season, from the Top 30.

Charlie's Angels continues to have a cult and pop culture following through syndication, DVD releases, and subsequent television shows. The show also spawned a media franchise with a film series started in 2000, which is a continuation of the series story with later generations of Angels. A reboot television series was broadcast in 2011, but was canceled after seven episodes.

== Development ==
After the success of Police Woman, the first hour long police drama starring a woman, Ivan Goff and Ben Roberts came up with the idea for a series about three beautiful female private investigators as a breakthrough but also as an escapist television series. Producers Aaron Spelling and Leonard Goldberg first considered actress Kate Jackson during the early pre-production stages of the series. She had proven popular with viewers in another police television drama, The Rookies. Jackson was initially cast as Kelly Garrett, but was more attracted to the role of Sabrina Duncan, and her request to switch roles was granted. Farrah Fawcett was next cast as Jill Munroe but, like Jackson, did not audition for a role. She was offered a part by Spelling after he had viewed her performance in the 1976 film Logan's Run. Jaclyn Smith was among the hundreds of actresses who auditioned for the role of Kelly Garrett. Despite liking Smith, Spelling and Goldberg were wary about hiring her because their initial concept concerned a brunette, blonde, and red-headed woman. Smith was the only brunette who auditioned for the role and was cast only after producers liked the on-screen chemistry she shared with Jackson and Fawcett.

Producer Leonard Goldberg had the initial idea, three years previously, for a show that would be a cross between The Avengers and Honey West, a short-lived drama from the 1960s about a female private investigator. Goff and Roberts had first titled the series The Alley Cats in which the three females (named Allison, Lee, and Catherine) would reside in alleys and wear whips and chains. Jackson disapproved of the title and, since she was given semi-control over the development of the series, she encouraged producers to find a new title. It was Jackson who decided the three women would be called "Angels" after seeing a picture of three angels hanging in Spelling's office, and the series became known as Harry's Angels. This title was changed, however, when ABC did not want to run into conflict with the series Harry O, and it thereby became Charlie's Angels.

In the initial concept of the series, the three females' boss would be a millionaire who often aided them in their assignments; however, Jackson and Spelling decided it would be more interesting to have the boss's identity remain a secret. With this, millionaire Charlie Townsend was an unseen character on the series who only spoke to the Angels via a Western Electric speakerphone. John Forsythe, who played the unseen Charlie Townsend, recorded his lines in an audio studio and was never on set. Thus, Forsythe rarely met any of his female co-stars. Some years later, he bumped into Farrah Fawcett at a tennis court; as he recalled, "I was coming off the court when she came up to me and said, 'Charlie! I finally met Charlie!'". Forsythe was offered the 'Charlie' role in a panicky late-night phone call from Spelling after the original choice, Gig Young, showed up too intoxicated to read his lines: "I didn't even take my pajamas off – I just put on my topcoat and drove over to Fox. When it was finished, Aaron Spelling said, 'That's perfect'. And I went home and went back to bed".

Spelling and Goldberg decided to add actor David Doyle to the cast as John Bosley, an employee of Charlie, who would frequently aid the Angels in their assignments. Although ABC had approved of a pilot film, they were concerned about how audiences would accept three women fighting crime on their own. ABC executives brought in David Ogden Stiers as Scott Woodville, who would act as the chief backup to the Angels and Bosley's superior; he would also be depicted as the organizer of the plan, in similar fashion to Jim Phelps in Mission: Impossible, a series for which Goff and Roberts had written.

The 74-minute pilot film initially aired on March 21, 1976. The story focuses heavily on Kelly Garrett (a role intended for Jackson before she and Smith swapped) who poses as an heiress who returns home to gain her father's successful winery. In the end of the film the three women are caught in a bind and Woodville attempts to save them, but to no avail, leaving them to solve the dilemma on their own (and with the help of allies made during the story). ABC executives were somewhat disappointed in this initial project, fearing there was more emphasis on camp than serious drama. According to The Charlie's Angels Casebook, audiences reacted negatively to the Scott Woodville character and Spelling encouraged executives to delete Woodville from the series. Bosley was kept, made slightly less inept than depicted in the pilot, and was given many of Woodville's attributes and responsibilities. The series formally premiered on Wednesday, September 22, 1976, at 10:00pm.

The pilot film received enormous ratings, but ABC – who thought this was one of the worst ideas for a TV series they had ever heard – did not believe the figures and showed the pilot again at a later date to check. The ratings were just as high, even for a repeat screening.

Each episode of the series cost between $575,000 and $600,000.

== Premise ==
"Once upon a time, there were three little girls who went to the police academy; and they were each assigned very hazardous duties. But I took them away from all that and now they work for me. My name is Charlie!"

— Charles "Charlie" Townsend's opening narration.

In the initial concept, Sabrina Duncan, Jill Munroe, and Kelly Garrett have graduated from the police academy in Los Angeles, California. Despite proving their capability during training, all three have subsequently been assigned by the Los Angeles Police Department to be a meter maid, office worker, and crossing guard, respectively. Dissatisfied with these jobs, they are recruited to work for the Charles Townsend Agency as private investigators. All of this is explained in the opening credit sequence; neither the pilot film nor subsequent series ever actually depicted an "origin story" as they are seen to have been working as investigators for some time as of the start of the pilot.

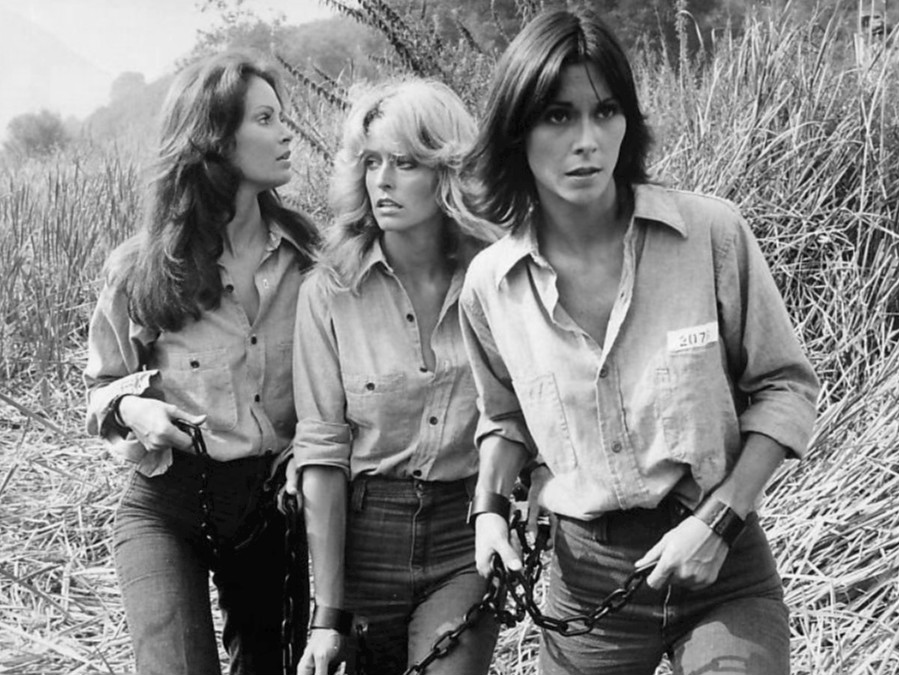
The trio as depicted in a publicity still for the "Angels in Chains" episode

Their boss, Charlie Townsend, who nicknames them "Angels", is never viewed full face, but is often seen from the back, mostly in the company of beautiful women. As a former detective, Charlie made many enemies. Therefore, to protect the Angels, as well as his own identity, Charlie gives the Angels their assignments via a speakerphone; he never meets them face to face (Bosley being the exception), which leads to recurring queries from the Angels as to when, or if, he will ever join them on an assignment.

In season two, San Francisco police academy graduate Kris Munroe takes the place of her older sister, Jill, in the trio; in the fourth season, Tiffany Welles, a Boston police academy graduate, takes Sabrina's place; and in the fifth and final season, upon Tiffany's departure, Julie Rogers, a former New York model fills the void when she is granted a temporary private detective license.

Charlie's Angels was generally formatted in the way of a procedural drama, much like the vast majority of other crime shows of the era. Many of the episodes follow a regular structure whereby a crime is committed, the 'Angels' are given the case details, and then they go undercover to solve the crime. Inevitably, the final scene takes place back at the Townsend office with Charlie offering his congratulations for a job well done. Most episodes have stand-alone plots and are usually not referenced in future episodes (for instance, in season 4's "Caged Angel", when Kris goes undercover at a women's prison, no mention is made of Kelly, Sabrina and Jill going undercover at a different prison in season 1's "Angels in Chains").

== Cast and characters ==
Actor	Character	Seasons				
Actor	Character	1 (1976–1977)	2 (1977–1978)	3 (1978–1979)	4 (1979–1980)	5 (1980–1981)
Kate Jackson	Sabrina Duncan	Main	Main	Main		
Farrah Fawcett (Note: Credited as Farrah Fawcett-Majors in seasons 1 and 3.)	Jill Munroe	Main		Guest	Guest	
Jaclyn Smith	Kelly Garrett	Main	Main	Main	Main	Main
David Doyle	John Bosley	Main	Main	Main	Main	Main
John Forsythe (voice) (Note: Uncredited)	Charles "Charlie" Townsend	Main	Main	Main	Main	Main
Cheryl Ladd	Kristine "Kris" Munroe		Main	Main	Main	Main
Shelley Hack	Tiffany Welles				Main	
Tanya Roberts	Julie Rogers					Main

== Cast changes ==
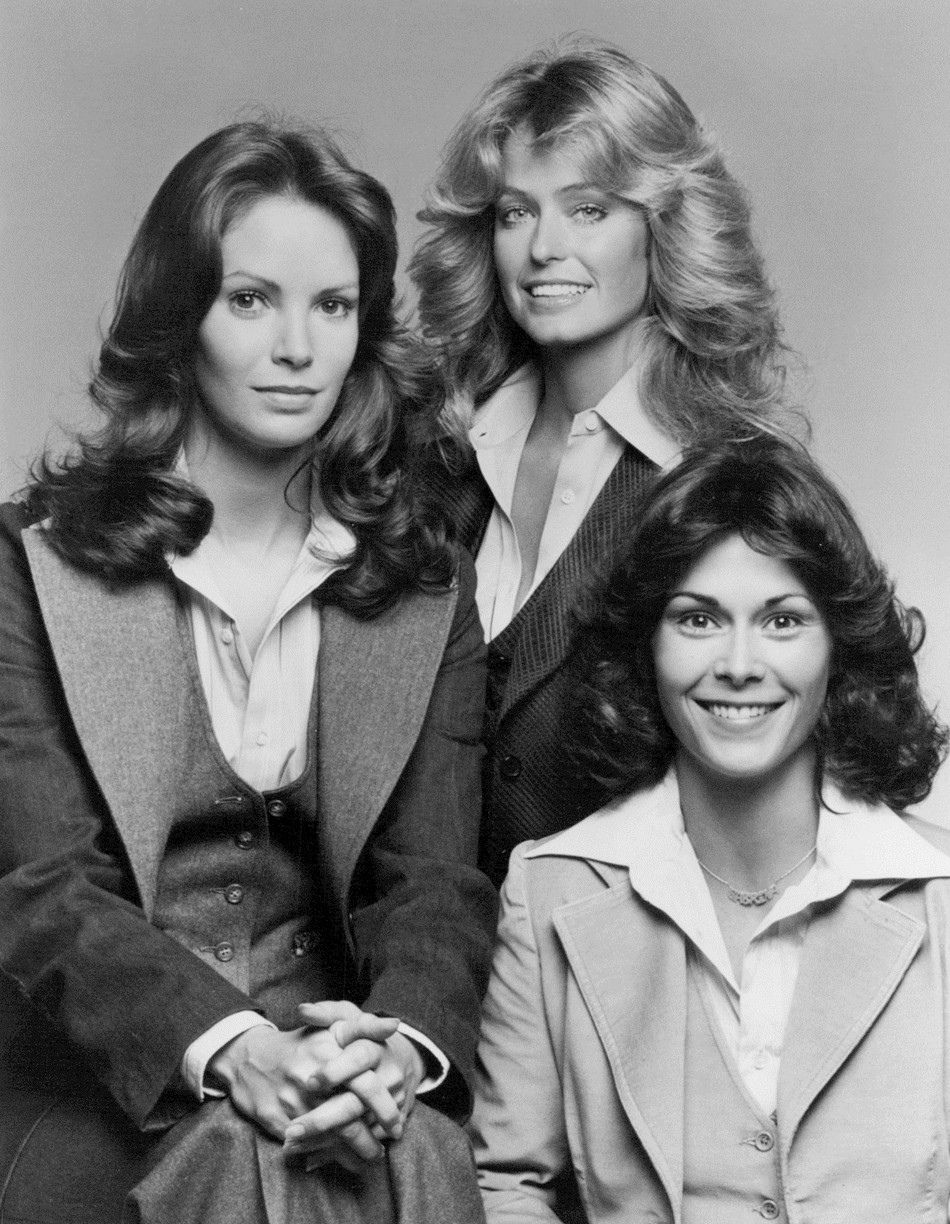
Season one cast (1976–1977): Jaclyn Smith, Farrah Fawcett, and Kate Jackson

Over the course of its five-year run, Charlie's Angels had a series of highly publicized cast changes. The first of these took place in the spring of 1977, just after the conclusion of the first season. Fawcett turned in her resignation just before the season one finale aired on May 4, 1977. Fawcett's decision not to return for a second season triggered a lawsuit against the actress by ABC and Spelling.

During the 1977 summer hiatus of the series, ABC and Fawcett entered a legal battle over her contract. At the beginning of the series, all three female leads signed five-year contracts, and the network was insistent that they live up to their commitments. Business partners Leonard Goldberg and Aaron Spelling tried to work out a deal with Fawcett and her agents. Goldberg and Spelling had arranged for her to make one film during her summer hiatuses, and her choice over subsequent television shows and miniseries. ABC even agreed to raise her salary from $5,000 to $8,000 a week, but she declined those offers. ABC reluctantly released her from her series contract in the summer of 1977. However, she was assigned to another contract with ABC, stating that since she left her contract four years early that she would return to the series later on in its run for six guest appearances. Fawcett would return as Jill Munroe on Charlie's Angels for three guest appearances in season three, and again returned for three more in season four.

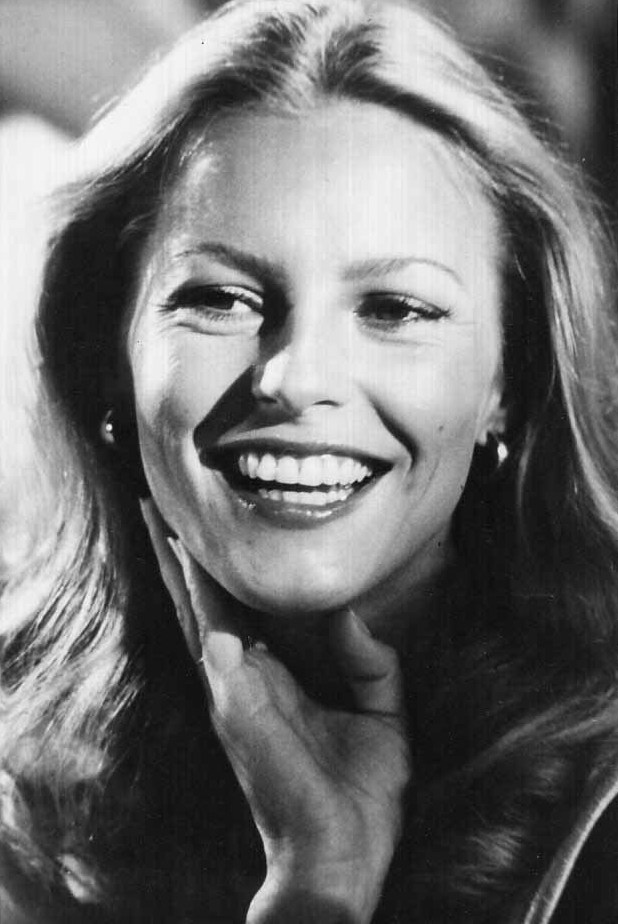
Cheryl Ladd as Kris Munroe

As Fawcett departed the series, ABC began searching for her replacement. Executives eventually noticed singer turned actress Cheryl Ladd and offered her a screen test. Initially, Ladd refused the opportunity for a screen test, but after lobbying from studio executives, she relented. Although executives noticed Ladd was inexperienced, they saw promise in her performance and signed her to a four-year contract. In an effort to keep the hype the series had with Fawcett, Ladd was written in the series as her sister, San Francisco police academy graduate Kris Munroe.

Ratings dropped during the third season. Jackson began to complain about the show's diminishing script quality (she once complained: "The scripts are so light it would take a week to get to the floor if you dropped it from the ceiling") and further stated that initially the series focused on "classic detective work", but had become more of a "cop story of the week". During the third season, Jackson was offered the part of Joanna Kramer in Kramer vs. Kramer (1979) with Dustin Hoffman but the Charlie's Angels producers refused to reorganize the shooting schedule to allow Jackson time off to shoot the film (the part of Joanna ultimately went to Meryl Streep, who won an Academy Award for her performance). Upset by this situation and her negative opinion of the scripts, Jackson became problematic, as she admitted, "I guess I did cause a few problems" and she was let go. In a statement, Spelling said: "Due to problems on the set, Kate is being dropped for the good of the show".

Casting calls for Jackson's replacement began during the summer of 1979. Several up-and-coming actresses were considered for the role, including Barbara Bach, Connie Sellecca, Shari Belafonte, Judith Chapman, newcomer Michelle Pfeiffer and The Price Is Right model Dian Parkinson. Revlon Charlie perfume model Shelley Hack also auditioned and was cast as Jackson's replacement. Producers at Spelling-Goldberg were quoted as saying: "We feel that Shelley Hack has exactly the talent, style, and intelligence we were looking for". Producer Spelling loved the idea of the headline "The Charlie Girl Becomes A Charlie's Angel". Hack debuted in the fourth-season premiere as Tiffany Welles, who graduated "top of her class" from the Boston police academy and recruited from the Boston Police Department. In hiring Hack, Spelling's priority for season four was to "bring back the glamour" while ABC hoped Hack's sophisticated personality would bring an interesting new mystique and intrigue to the series. However, after an initial spike in the ratings, they began to erode, so in an attempt to revitalize declining ratings and regain popularity, ABC released Hack from her contract in February 1980. A statement later issued by Spelling-Goldberg read: "When she signed her contract for the series, Miss Hack had a personal agreement that she could review her continuation with the show at the end of her first season since series television represented an enormous change in her career and lifestyle", implying that Hack was included in the decision to exit Charlie's Angels. In an interview with People, Hack said: "They can say I didn't work out, but it isn't true. What happened was a network war. A business decision was made. Change the timeslot or bring on some new publicity. How to get publicity? A new Angel hunt. Who is the obvious person to replace? I am—the new kid on the block". She theorized, "I was supposed to play the 'Intelligent College Girl from the East' [perhaps] that type didn't fit into Charlie's Angels." Hack later stated: "I never expected to be there more than a year and I wasn't. I did my year and I moved on".

Casting calls went out for Hack's replacement. After a series of false commitments, Spelling and ABC selected model and former dance instructor Tanya Roberts, beating out Jayne Kennedy, Susie Coelho, and what Roberts skeptically called "the [other] alleged 2,000 Angel candidates". Roberts debuted in the fifth-season premiere as Julie Rogers, a streetwise fighter and model from New York, but the season premiere episode drew mild ratings. She was pictured on the cover of People magazine and featured in an article surrounding the series. The article, titled "Is the Jiggle Up?", asked if Roberts could save Charlie's Angels from cancellation. Executive Brett Garwood said that they hoped to keep the show going for next year, but nothing was certain. Between November 1980 and June 1981, the series was broadcast in three different time slots and its ratings further declined, so ABC cancelled the show in the spring of 1981.

== Reception ==
=== Critical reception ===
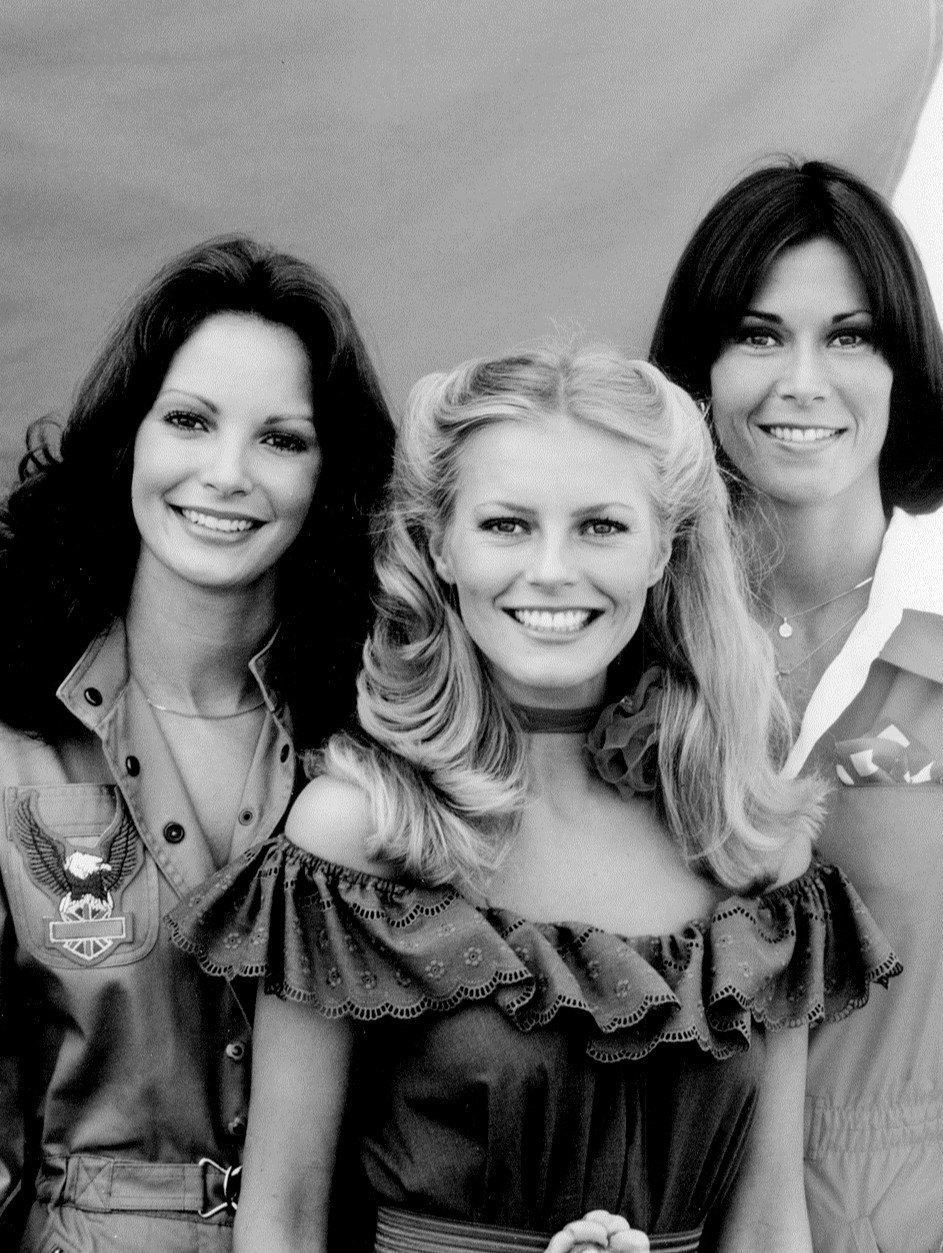
Cast for seasons 2–3 (left to right): Jaclyn Smith, Cheryl Ladd, and Kate Jackson

Charlie's Angels became known as "Jiggle TV". Jiggle TV was also called "Tits & Ass Television" or "T&A" for short and in the 1970s the amount of sex on television increased, as did its ratings, creating social controversies and consequences, by critics who believed that the TV series had no intelligence or substance. These characterizations stemmed from the fact that the lead actresses frequently dressed scantily or provocatively as part of their undercover characters (including roller derby girl, beauty pageant contestant, maid, female prisoner, or just bikini-clad), and the belief that their clothing was a means of attracting viewers. "Jiggle TV" is seen as trashy and escapist entertainment. Farrah Fawcett once attributed the TV show's success to this fact: "When the show was number three, I figured it was our acting. When it got to be number one, I decided it could only be because none of us wears a bra". Contrariwise on TV Tales, Cheryl Ladd said "I'm just saying, personally, I wore a bra"; Shelley Hack stated: "I don't jiggle much, so I didn't have anything to worry about"; and Jaclyn Smith said, "Jiggle TV. I thought it was ridiculous".

Reflecting on the 1970s female-driven drama, Jaclyn Smith, who was the only 'Angel' to star on all five seasons, states how Charlie's Angels changed her – and TV audiences across America: "It was ground-breaking. It was about three emotionally and financially independent women. We shot at beautiful locations with fancy fast cars, and they cared about each other, so there was a heart to the show. Critics said that as actresses we were sexually exploited, but it was a nursery rhyme. We were in a bathing suit at the beach, and if there was a hint of a love scene, it was so proper. I think the producers were smart. They wanted to bring in that younger audience and did want families to watch together". Smith adds: "Each of our characters had their own unique personality, yet the show was all very cohesive - it just worked. We really were all good friends and that showed on the screen".

Ladd believed the TV series was "inspirational" to women despite the critics calling it a "jiggle show". She noted, "there hadn't been a show like this on the air [with] three powerful women who had the latest hairdos, wore the coolest clothes and could walk around in a bikini. We were very inspirational to a lot of young women. Young women would write us and say, 'I want to be like you. I want to be a cop when I grow up and taking chances to be something else other than the acceptable school teacher or secretary'". In reference to the show being called "Jiggle TV", Ladd said: "Which made me laugh, I never went braless, and I was married and the mother of a 2-year-old. The 'Angels' were grown-up Girl Scouts. We never slept with anyone; my most 'Aaron Spelling' moment was wrestling an alligator. With the feminist movement, we were kind of half-heroes, half-goats".

Hack said: "Of course it's fluff, but high-grade fluff. You don't compare Agatha Christie to Tolstoy". Additionally, referring to the Revlon Charlie commercials and Charlie's Angels, she stated on The Oprah Winfrey Show: "I was lucky. There were two things I was in that were about making women feel a little more empowered".

Kate Jackson has stated that she believes the first season of Charlie's Angels was the TV show's high point, and it was the most fun for herself, Smith, and Fawcett: "When you think about Charlie's Angels, you think about three specific people". Jackson added: "I don't know what the connection that the three of us have is, but it is there, and it is something extremely special. I think that is the reason the show worked".

Time magazine called Charlie's Angels an "aesthetically ridiculous, commercially brilliant brainstorm surfing blithely atop the Zeitgeist's seventh wave".

Camille Paglia, an American academic and social critic, said that Charlie's Angels was an "effervescent action-adventure showing smart, bold women working side by side in fruitful collaboration".

=== Public reception ===
Charlie's Angels proved to be a runaway hit in the 1976–1977 season in its first of five time slots, Wednesdays at 10:00pm, where it followed Baretta. Facing little competition from CBS and NBC, Charlie's Angels finished fifth in Nielsen ratings in the spring of 1977 with an average 26.0 rating. The three lead actresses were suddenly propelled to stardom, with Kate Jackson later commenting that the first few months were like being in the eye of a storm. Farrah Fawcett became hugely popular and was branded a phenomenon. However, the situation off screen was not as rewarding. The long working hours on set, combined with numerous calls for photo shoots, wardrobe fittings, and promotional interviews, took their toll on the trio. Jackson was especially unhappy as she felt the quality of scripts was declining and the format was now more "cop story of the week" rather than classy undercover drama, which had been the intention with the pilot film.

With season two, the series moved up an hour to the Wednesday 9:00pm time slot, where it stayed for three years. During that time, the series competed with such popular shows as One Day at a Time, The Jeffersons (on CBS), and Diff'rent Strokes (on NBC). The transition from Fawcett to Cheryl Ladd in the second season proved to be popular with viewers. While viewership dipped marginally in the second season, the series still remained in the top five for the 1977–78 season, placing fourth in the ratings, tying with 60 Minutes and All in the Family. In the third season, viewership stabilized, but the series began losing traction as it ranked twelfth behind newcomers Mork & Mindy, The Ropers, and Taxi (all on ABC) for the 1978–79 season. With Jackson's departure and Shelley Hack entering the cast, the show's fourth season saw some ratings erosion as it ranked twentieth for the 1979–80 season, tying with Barney Miller.

The fifth season saw the final cast change with Tanya Roberts. The final season was plagued by the 1980 actors strike, causing a delayed premier date. In addition, the series was shuffled around with three different time slots: Sundays at 8:00pm, Saturdays at 8:00pm, and finally Wednesdays at 8:00pm, where it remained for the remainder of its run. Despite generally receiving mild competition from its rival networks on these time slots, Charlie's Angels placed fifty-ninth out of sixty-five shows for the 1980–81 season. ABC thereby canceled the series after five seasons and 115 episodes.

=== Nielsen ratings / broadcast history ===
The Charlie's Angels seventy four minute pilot film that aired on March 21, 1976, received enormous ratings, but ABC network — who thought this was one of the worst ideas for a TV series they had ever heard — did not believe the figures and showed it again a week later to check. At the time of Spelling pitching the pilot of Charlie's Angels to the network, ABC executive Michael Eisner told Spelling that his pitch had to be "one of the worst ideas I've ever heard", and ABC executive Barry Diller claimed no one would ever watch it. Despite the ABC network's disbelief in the project, the repeat ratings were just as high.

== Awards and nominations ==
Golden Globes (1977)

- Best Television Series - Drama, Charlie's Angels (Nominated)
- Best Actress in a Television Series - Drama, Farrah Fawcett-Majors (Nominated)
- Best Actress in a Television Series - Drama, Kate Jackson (Nominated)

Golden Globes (1978)

- Best Television Series - Drama (Nominated)
- Best Actress in a Television Series - Drama, Kate Jackson (Nominated)

Golden Globes (1979)

- Best Actress in a Television Series - Drama, Kate Jackson (Nominated)

Golden Globes (1980)

- Best Actor in a Supporting Role - Television Series, David Doyle (Nominated)

Photoplay Awards (1979)

- Favorite TV Program (Nominated)

Primetime Emmy Awards (1977)

- Outstanding Lead Actress in a Drama Series, Kate Jackson (Nominated)
- Outstanding Continuing Performance by a Supporting Actor in a Drama Series, David Doyle (Nominated)
- Outstanding Achievement in Film Sound Editing for a Series (Nominated)

Primetime Emmy Awards (1978)

- Outstanding Lead Actress in a Drama Series, Kate Jackson (Nominated)

People's Choice Awards (1977)

- Favorite Overall New TV Program (Winner)
- Favorite Female Performer in a New TV Program, Farrah Fawcett-Majors (Winner)

American Cinema Editors, USA (1978)

- Best Edited Episode from a Television Series (Nominated)

TV Land Awards (2003)

- Favorite "Heard-But-Not-Seen" Character, John Forsythe (Winner)
- Most Amazing Cast Crossover, Charlie's Angels and The Love Boat (Winner)

TV Land Awards (2004)

- Favorite "Fan"-tastic Phenomenon, Farrah Fawcett (Winner)
- Most Memorable Mane, Farrah Fawcett (Winner)
- Favorite "Heard-But-Not-Seen" Character, John Forsythe (Nominated)

TV Land Awards (2007)

- Favorite "Heard-But-Not-Seen" Character, John Forsythe (Winner)
- TV Theme Song You Most Want for Your Ring Tone (Nominated)

TV Land Awards (2010)

- Pop Culture Award, Charlie's Angels (Winner)

Online Film & Television Association (2015)

- OFTA TV Hall of Fame, Television Program, Charlie's Angels (Winner)

== Notable guest stars ==
Charlie's Angels played host to a number of well-known faces during its five seasons. Some of those individuals were long-established stars of film and television; others would find considerable fame and recognition many years after appearing in the program. Notable appearances of celebrities (whether famous then or later) include those of:

- Jack Albertson
- Richard Anderson
- René Auberjonois (twice)
- Nina Axelrod
- Jim Backus
- G. W. Bailey
- Richard Bakalyan (3 times)
- Olivia Barash
- Gene Barry (twice)
- Kim Basinger
- Ed Begley Jr.
- Michael Bell (twice)
- Dirk Benedict (twice)
- Barbi Benton
- Lloyd Bochner (twice)
- Sonny Bono
- Barry Bostwick
- Eric Braeden
- Peter Brown
- Dr. Joyce Brothers
- Horst Buchholz
- Edd Byrnes
- Michael Callan (twice)
- Joanna Cassidy
- Kim Cattrall
- Dennis Cole (3 times)
- John Colicos
- Gary Collins (twice)
- Stephen Collins
- Bert Convy
- Pat Cooper
- Michael Conrad
- Nicolas Coster
- Scatman Crothers
- Patricia Crowley (twice)
- Jamie Lee Curtis
- Brian Cutler
- Timothy Dalton
- Patti D'Arbanville
- James Darren
- Robert Davi
- Sammy Davis Jr.
- Bradford Dillman
- Robert Donner
- Howard Duff
- Patrick Duffy
- Andrew Duggan
- Robert Englund
- Antonio Fargas
- Alan Feinstein (twice)
- Norman Fell
- Joe Flynn
- Rosemary Forsyth
- Jonathan Frakes
- Anne Francis (twice)
- Slim Gaillard
- James Gammon (twice)
- Ellen Geer
- Christopher George
- Frank Gorshin
- Fred Grandy
- Gary Grubbs
- Dan Haggerty
- David Hedison (twice)
- Alex Henteloff
- Don Ho
- Bo Hopkins (twice)
- Tab Hunter
- Joyce Jameson
- L. Q. Jones (4 times)
- Tommy Lee Jones
- Louis Jourdan
- Elaine Joyce
- Steve Kanaly
- Casey Kasem
- Roz Kelly (twice)
- Sally Kirkland (twice)
- Bernie Kopell
- Martin Kove
- Fernando Lamas
- Audrey Landers
- Judy Landers (twice)
- Ted Lange
- Christopher Lee
- Joanne Linville
- Gary Lockwood
- Robert Loggia (twice)
- Ida Lupino
- Richard Lynch
- Carol Lynley
- Gavin MacLeod
- Randolph Mantooth
- Dean Martin
- Robin Mattson
- Brad Maule
- Amanda McBroom
- Mercedes McCambridge
- Sandy McPeak
- Eve McVeagh
- Denny Miller
- Ray Milland
- Cameron Mitchell (twice)
- Vic Morrow (twice)
- Richard Mulligan
- Craig T. Nelson
- France Nguyen
- Simon Oakland
- Dan O'Herlihy
- Gerald S. O'Loughlin
- Janis Paige
- Stacy Peralta
- Joanna Pettet
- Jo Ann Pflug
- Sarah Purcell
- Robert Pine (twice)
- Dack Rambo
- Anne Ramsey
- Robert Reed
- Bert Remsen (twice)
- Peter Mark Richman
- Richard Romanus
- Cesar Romero
- Dick Sargent (3 times)
- Bob Seagren
- Tom Selleck
- Doug Sheehan
- Stephen Shortridge
- James B. Sikking (twice)
- Phil Silvers
- Louise Sorel
- Barbara Stanwyck
- Tisha Sterling
- Jackie Stewart
- David Ogden Stiers
- Christopher Stone
- Harold J. Stone
- Lauren Tewes (twice)
- Robert Urich
- Lyle Waggoner
- Mary Woronov
- Nicholas Worth
- Jane Wyman

== Home media ==
In 1997, episodes were released on Columbia TriStar Home Video Screen Gems VHS during a wave of 1970s nostalgia VHS releases.

Sony Pictures Home Entertainment released all five seasons of Charlie's Angels on DVD in region one over the span of ten years, with the fifth and final season released as a Manufacture-on-Demand (MOD) release, available exclusively through Amazon.com & WBShop.com and only in the U.S. Additionally, seasons 1–3 have been released on DVD in regions 2 and 4.

Mill Creek Entertainment acquired the rights to various television series from the Sony Pictures library including Charlie's Angels in 2013. They subsequently re-released the first season on DVD on January 21, 2014.

Mill Creek re-released Charlie's Angels: The Complete Series on DVD in Region 1 on September 6, 2016. The twenty disc set contains all 110 episodes of the series.

Mill Creek released the entire series on Blu-ray for the first time in fall 2019. Plays on Region 2 Blu-ray

Season	Ep #	Release dates			Notes
Season	Ep #	Region 1	Region 2	Region 4	Notes
1	23	May 27, 2003; January 21, 2014 (re-release)	June 23, 2003	September 29, 2010	Includes the seventy four minute pilot TV movie
2	24	April 6, 2004	February 19, 2007	January 13, 2011	The two-hour episodes "Angels in Paradise" and "Angels on Ice" appear as syndicated versions
3	22	July 4, 2006	April 20, 2009	March 2, 2011	The two-hour episodes "Angels in Vegas" and "Terror on Skis" appear as syndicated versions
4	25	July 21, 2009	TBA	TBA	The two-hour episode "Love Boat Angels" appears as the syndicated version
5	16	January 1, 2013	TBA	TBA	The two-hour episode "Angel in Hiding" appears as the syndicated version
Complete Series	110	September 25, 2012; September 6, 2016 (re-release); October 29, 2019 (Blu-ray)	TBA	TBA	

Note: Episode count is based on the format in which episodes originally aired. Two hour episodes are counted as one episode.

== Episodes ==
Season	Episodes	Originally released		Rank	Rating
Season	Episodes	First released	Last released	Rank	Rating
Pilot	1	March 21, 1976		6	30.6 (Note: Telecast on The ABC Sunday Night Movie.)
1	22	September 22, 1976	May 4, 1977	5	25.8
2	26	September 14, 1977	May 10, 1978	4	24.4 (Note: Tied with 60 Minutes and All in the Family.)
3	24	September 13, 1978	May 16, 1979	12	24.4
4	26	September 12, 1979	May 7, 1980	20	20.9 (Note: Tied with Barney Miller.)
5	17	November 30, 1980	June 24, 1981	59	—N/a

=== Attempted spin-off ===
ABC attempted to create a spin-off of Charlie's Angels in 1980 called Toni's Boys. The backdoor pilot aired near the end of season four, simply titled "Toni's Boys" (season 4, episode 23). The episode starred Barbara Stanwyck as Antonia "Toni" Blake, a wealthy widow socialite and friend of Charlie's who ran a detective agency she inherited from her late husband. The agency was staffed by three handsome male detectives — Cotton Harper (Stephen Shortridge), a champion rodeo rider, roper, and tracker, Bob Sorensen (Bob Seagren), a former U.S. Olympic champion, and Matt Parrish (Bruce Bauer), a master in disguises and weapons — who took direction from Toni, and solved crimes in a manner similar to the Angels. The show was not picked up as a regular series for the following season.

=== Crossovers ===
The character Dan Tanna (played by Robert Urich) from the detective series Vega$ appeared in the episode "Angels in Vegas" a week before the Vega$ season one debut. The crossover was simply used to reintroduce the Dan Tanna character and to promote Vega$ as an ongoing series.

In the episode "Love Boat Angels", the angels went on another popular Aaron Spelling show, The Love Boat, and met the crew. Gavin MacLeod, Bernie Kopell, Fred Grandy, Ted Lange, and Lauren Tewes guest starred as their The Love Boat characters. The episode aired on September 12, 1979, as the fourth-season premiere and the debut episode of Shelley Hack as Tiffany Welles. The episode placed number one in the Nielson ratings for the week.

Although technically not crossovers, the cast made some notable appearances together. In 1976, Jackson, Smith, and Fawcett appeared as themselves on The Captain & Tennille Show. In the fall of 1977, Jackson, Smith, and Ladd appeared as themselves in the first episode of the Spelling-produced comedy series, The San Pedro Beach Bums.

== Syndication ==
The show was first syndicated on local stations such as KTLA in Los Angeles and WNEW in New York in September 1981, and later on TNT, TV Land, Cloo, ION, Cozi TV, MeTV and getTV. As of 2025, all five seasons can be purchased in the USA on iTunes and Amazon Prime Video. As of 2009, the series is still available for syndication to local television stations in the United States. As of 2026, the show has aired in the U.S. on digital broadcast television networks Cozi TV and getTV and the streaming services Crackle, Amazon Prime Video, Plex, The Roku Channel and Tubi as well as the ActionCore and Classic TV Rewind YouTube channels (managed by Sony Pictures Television).

== Other versions ==
The series spawned a franchise with a film series which is a continuation of the story with new generations of Angels. It has also inspired many remakes and reinterpretations throughout the years and in different countries. It has also been featured in various other media.

=== Film series ===
The Charlie's Angels 1976 original television series inspired Flower Films production company's two films, Charlie's Angels (2000) and Charlie's Angels: Full Throttle (2003), with John Forsythe returning as Charlie. Whereas most movie remakes of 1970s TV shows, like Starsky and Hutch, are actually remakes, the Charlie's Angels films are set in a different time and thus closer to a film revival. The mythology goes that whenever an Angel leaves, she is replaced so there are always three. The second film had more nods to the TV series than the first film, with Jaclyn Smith making a brief cameo as Kelly Garrett.

Charlie's Angels (2000) is an American action comedy film based on the Charlie's Angels 1976 original television series. Unlike the original series, which had dramatic elements, the film featured more comical elements than were seen in the series. The film was directed by McG, adapted by screenwriters Ryan Rowe, Ed Solomon, and John August. Cameron Diaz, Drew Barrymore, and Lucy Liu star as three women working in a private detective agency in Los Angeles. Bill Murray plays Bosley and John Forsythe reprised his role as the unseen Charlie's voice from the original series. Making cameo appearances are Tom Green (who was dating Barrymore at the time of production) and LL Cool J.

A sequel, entitled Charlie's Angels: Full Throttle (2003), was directed by McG and written by John August and Cormac and Marianne Wibberley. In an ensemble cast, Diaz, Barrymore, and Liu return as the angels Natalie, Dylan, and Alex, respectively. It sees Crispin Glover and Matt LeBlanc returning, as well as featuring Bruce Willis, Demi Moore, Carrie Fisher, Shia LaBeouf, Robert Patrick, Justin Theroux, Luke Wilson, John Cleese, and Rodrigo Santoro, with Jaclyn Smith reprising her role as Kelly Garrett, and Bernie Mac as Bosley's brother. This was John Forsythe's final film appearance before his retirement and his death in 2010. The film opened in the United States on June 27, 2003, and was number one at the box office for that weekend, also making a worldwide total of $259.2 million.

Elizabeth Banks wrote and directed a new film of the franchise, starring Kristen Stewart, Naomi Scott and Ella Balinska as the leading trio of the fighting team, and Banks also star as Bosley, with the film featuring multiple characters named Bosley. It was later revealed that the new movie would not be a reboot or a remake of the franchise but rather a continuation that incorporated the events of the original TV series and the McG-directed 2000s films.

=== Behind the Camera ===
In 2004, a television film entitled Behind the Camera: The Unauthorized Story of Charlie's Angels aired on NBC; it was based on the book Charlie's Angels Casebook, by Jack Condon and David Hofstede.

=== Angels '88 and Reboot ===
Four women (including future star Tea Leoni) were selected to be in a show called Angels '88, which was to serve as an updated version of the show. The show was later named Angels '89, but after production delays and a writers' strike, the project was abandoned before notice was taken. The primary difference of Charlie's Angels and Angels '88 is the concept of Angels '88 being about four actresses who decide to open their own detective agency after their television show, in which they played private detectives, was cancelled.

In November 2009, ABC began to make a television revival of Charlie's Angels, with Josh Friedman handling both writing and executive producing duties, and Drew Barrymore and Leonard Goldberg sharing co-production duties. Developed by Alfred Gough and Miles Millar for ABC, the reboot series premiered by the network on September 22, 2011. ABC canceled the reboot series after one month on October 14, due to low ratings and concluding on November 10, with seven episodes (the eighth and last one was unaired in the US).

=== International versions ===
From 1998 to 1999, Telemundo and Sony produced a show called Ángeles. The weekly hour format did not catch on with Hispanic viewers, who are accustomed to watching telenovelas nightly, and the series was soon canceled. In 2002, a German version of Charlie's Angels, Wilde Engel, was produced by the German channel RTL. The show was known as Anges de choc in French-speaking countries, and as Three Wild Angels in English-speaking ones. In 2005, the Taiwanese version of Charlie's Angels titled Asian Charlie's Angels (幻影天使), originally produced for AXN Taiwan in 2001, was aired in the United States by ImaginAsian.

=== Subsequent Angels ===
- Natalie Cook, played by Cameron Diaz in Charlie's Angels (2000) & Charlie's Angels: Full Throttle (2003)
- Dylan Sanders, played by Drew Barrymore in Charlie's Angels (2000) & Charlie's Angels: Full Throttle
- Alex Munday, played by Lucy Liu in Charlie's Angels (2000) & Charlie's Angels: Full Throttle
- Madison Lee, played by Demi Moore in Charlie's Angels: Full Throttle (2003)
- Sabina Wilson, played by Kristen Stewart in Charlie's Angels (2019)
- Elena Houghlin, played by Naomi Scott in Charlie's Angels (2019)
- Jane Kano, played by Ella Balinska in Charlie's Angels (2019)
- Rebekah, played by Elizabeth Banks in Charlie's Angels (2019)
- Ingrid, played by Hannah Hoekstra in Charlie's Angels (2019)
- Danica Patrick, Ronda Rousey, Laverne Cox, Hailee Steinfeld, Lili Reinhart, Aly Raisman, Chloe Kim and Huda Kattan, are all appeared in cameos as the Angels in Charlie's Angels (2019)

=== Reboot Angels ===
- Kate Prince, played by Annie Ilonzeh in Charlie's Angels (2011)
- Abby Simpson, played by Rachael Taylor in Charlie's Angels (2011)
- Eve French, played by Minka Kelly and young Eve, played by Taylor Blackwell in Charlie's Angels (2011)
- Gloria Martinez, played by Nadine Velazquez and young Gloria, played by Anahi Article in Charlie's Angels (2011)
- Zoe Sinclair / Oswald, played by Peyton List in Charlie's Angels (2011)

=== Unofficial Angels ===
- Connie Bonnet (1988–1989), played by Claire Yarlett, in Angels '89
- Pam Ryan (1988–1989), played by Karen Kopins, in Angels '89
- Trisha Lawrence (1988–1989), played by Sandra Canning, in Angels '89
- Bernie Colter (1988–1989), played by Téa Leoni, in Angels '89
- Adriana Vega (1998–1999), played by Patricia Manterola, Ángeles
- Elena Sanchez (1998–1999), played by Sandra Vida, Ángeles
- Gina Navarro (1998–1999), played by Cole Pitman, Ángeles
- Christina "Chris" Rabe (2002–2003), played by Birgit Stauber, Wilde Engel
- Franziska Borgardt (2002–2003), played by Susann Uplegger, Wilde Engel
- Lena Heitmann (2002–2003), played by Eva Habermann, Wilde Engel
- Betty (2004), played by Qu Ying, Asian Charlie's Angels
- Cindy (2004), played by Kelly Lin, Asian Charlie's Angels
- Annabelle (2004), played by Annie Wu, Asian Charlie's Angels
- Angie (2004), played by Christy Chung, Asian Charlie's Angels
- Rebecca (2005), played by Vanessa Petruo, Wilde Engel
- Ida (2005), played by Tanja Wenzel, Wilde Engel
- Aiko (2005), played by Zora Holt, Wilde Engel
- In Charlie's Angels: Full Throttle (2003), Eve and Mary-Kate and Ashley Olsen appear as future Angels but only in Dylan Sanders' imagination.

=== Collectible items ===
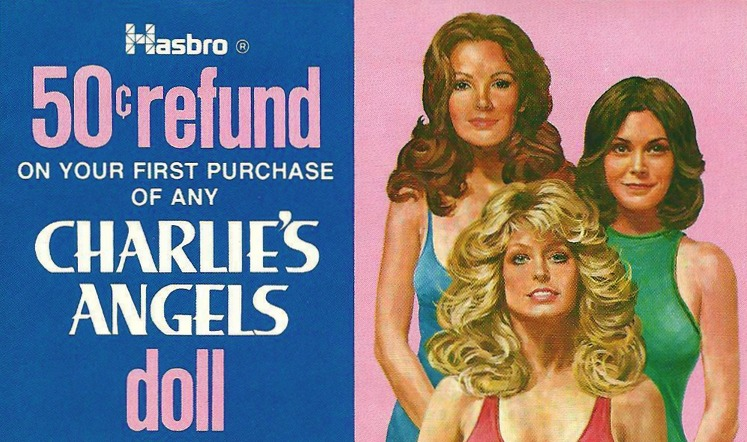
A coupon for the Charlie's Angels dolls by Hasbro.

During the TV show's run, Hasbro Industries produced an extensive range of Charlie's Angels merchandise, which was distributed in the United States, the United Kingdom, and other international markets. A numerous variety of collectible items were produced, including two versions of dolls, board games, numerous posters, several sets of trading cards, notebooks, a lunchbox and thermos set, a Charlie's Angels toy van, children's beauty products and even record albums. Author Sherrie A. Inness, in the text 'Disco Divas: Women and Popular Culture in the 1970s' writes that "Charlie's Angels merchandise was big business, Hasbro spent over $2.5 million to advertise its Charlie's Angels dolls".

In the United Kingdom, as was common with many popular American programs of the era, a series of tie-in hardcover annuals were published by World International Publishing Ltd, containing stories, comics, photos, puzzles and features on the stars. There are four Charlie's Angels annuals in total.

Although it was not connected to the show, a 1976 poster of Farrah Fawcett sporting a red bathing suit became the biggest selling poster in history with 12 million copies sold. This poster also helped the burgeoning popularity of the series. The red swimsuit that helped make Farrah Fawcett a 1970s icon became part of the Smithsonian's collection in 2011. The picture has been immortalized as a Black Label Barbie Collection doll and the legendary red bathing suit has been donated to the Smithsonian Institution in Washington, D.C. The designer of that swimsuit is Norma Kamali.

==== Comics ====
Two British comic strip versions were produced. The first appeared in the Polystyle publication Target in April 1978, drawn by John Canning. Target was a sister title to the long-running TV Comic aimed at older children and featuring TV action and crime shows of the day. Proving unpopular, it folded in August and merged back into TV Comic where Canning's Angels strip continued until October 1979. The second strip was printed in Junior TV Times Look-in, debuting in November 1979 (as soon as Polystyle's deal expired), written by Angus Allan and drawn by Jim Baikie and Bill Titcombe.

In June 2018, a six-issue limited comic book series based on the television series was launched by Dynamite Entertainment. A crossover comic book series with Charlie's Angels and The Bionic Woman, titled Charlie's Angels vs. the Bionic Woman was released on July 3, 2019.

== 50th year reunion ==
Actresses Kate Jackson, Jaclyn Smith and Cheryl Ladd reunited at the PaleyFest LA on April 6, 2026, to celebrate the golden anniversary of Charlie's Angels. They shared personal anecdotes about their time in the 1970s series.

== See also ==
- The Doll Squad, a film about another group of shapely female operatives
- Cagney & Lacey
- Sto Para Pente, a Greek TV series
- She Spies
