= William T Naud =

American film director and screenwriter

William T. Naud
- Born: June 7, 1929 (age 97); New York City, US
- Occupations: Film producer, film director, screenwriter
- Years active: 1964-2011
- Spouse: Karen Chutsky
- Website: ojispygirlsatthegate.com

William T. Naud (born June 7, 1929) is an American director, writer and producer. His films include Ricky 1, Wild in the Sky and Island of Blood. He is best known for creating television game shows such as Rhyme and Reason and Haggis Baggis.

== Career ==
William T. Naud, sometimes credited as Bill Naud, was born in New York City, New York on June 7, 1929. He created his first game show in 1958 called Haggis Baggis for Rainbow Productions (Joseph Cates Productions) starring Jack Linkletter.

Naud produced his first movie Thunder in Dixie in 1964 starring Harry Millard, Judy Lewis, Nancy Berg and Mike Bradford. The film’s promotional teaser line was "500 miles of gut wrenching suspence (sic)" and was a "drive-in programmer, filmed at the Atlanta Motor Speedway; utilizing stock footage from the 1962 Dixie 400." Naud wrote and directed the 1982 mystery horror film Island of Blood, (also known as Whodunit? and Scared Alive: Island of Blood) starring Marie-Alise Recasner. In a 2018 newspaper interview, he was quoted to say about the film, "Every week it seems, someone calls me for something I might have for Island of Blood for a convention or something," The story is based on the novel And Then There Were None by Agatha Christie. The theme song "Face to Face" was written by the band Factor Four.

In 1972, Naud directed Wild in the Sky (AKA Black Jack). The film starred James Daly as the President of the United States with three escaped prisoners played by Brandon deWilde, Georg Stanford Brown and Phil Vandervort. In 1983, Naud wrote, produced and directed Ricky 1 (titled Heart to Win in Australia); a parody of the film Rocky with references to other movies such as The Godfather. It was not released until 1988. The leading character's catchphrase throughout the film is: "Don't be negative."

Naud created the daytime television show The Girl in My Life. Hosted by Fred Holliday, it showcased American women and aired on ABC from 1973 to 1974. The show replaced the 2:30 p.m. afternoon spot normally held by The Dating Game. It was spoofed in an episode on The Carol Burnett Show called: "The Girl That We Like". On July 7, 1975, the game show Rhyme and Reason premiered on ABC, hosted by Bob Eubanks, with announcer Johnny Jacobs. It was the #1 rated game show in 1975. Panelists included Richard Dawson, Jaye P. Morgan, Nipsey Russell, Jack Cassidy, William Shatner, Joanne Worley, Dick Clark and others. Family Feud replaced the show at 1:30 pm time slot on July 7, 1976. Naud said, "For some reason I have a penchant for game shows and a knack for creating them."

In 2012, it was announced that Ryan Seacrest was in talks with Small World IFT to produce an updated "hip hop" version of Rhyme and Reason called Rhyme, Rap or Reason through his production company Ryan Seacrest Productions. Naud also attempted to revive Rhyme and Reason locally in 2018 from his hometown of Boothbay Harbor, Maine with celebrity panelists horror-writer Stephen King and humorist Tim Sample.

== Personal life ==
Naud is married to artist and author, Karen Chutsky. Together they wrote the book Oji - Spy Girls at the Gate. They live in Boothbay Harbor, Maine.

== Filmography ==
=== Film ===
Year	Title	Role
1964	Thunder in Dixie	Producer-Director
1966	Hot Rod Hullabaloo	Producer-Director
1972	Wild in the Sky	Producer-Director
1982	Island of Blood	Producer-Director- Screenwriter
1988	Ricky 1	Producer-Director-Screenwriter
1988	Necromancer	Screenwriter

=== Television ===
Year	Title	Role
1958	Haggis Baggis	Creator
1973	The Girl in My Life	Producer-Creator
1975	Rhyme and Reason	Producer-Creator
1975	Blank Check	Producer-Creator

== Bibliography ==
- Naud, Willam T (2011). Oji - Spy Girls at the Gate. Grovesnor Square Press. ISBN 978-1466351509.
