= List of The Rookies episodes =

This is a list of episodes for the television series The Rookies.

== Series overview ==
Season	Episodes	Originally released	
Season	Episodes	First released	Last released
Pilot movie		March 7, 1972	
1	23	September 11, 1972	March 19, 1973
2	23	September 10, 1973	March 18, 1974
3	24	September 9, 1974	March 17, 1975
4	23	September 9, 1975	March 30, 1976

== Episodes ==
=== Pilot movie (1972) ===
Title	Directed by	Written by	Original release date
The Rookies	Jud Taylor	Story by : Rita Lakin; Teleplay by : William Blinn	March 7, 1972
Pilot episode: Terry Webster, Willie Gillis, and Mike Danko go through rigorous training before being given their first assignments, which turn out to be not what they expected.

=== Season 1 (1972–73) ===
No. overall	No. in season	Title	Directed by	Written by	Original release date
1	1	"Concrete Valley, Neon Sky"	Michael Caffey	Hal Sitowitz	September 11, 1972
The Rookies are assigned the challenge of maintaining order amongst rivaling street gangs, with Willie Gillis offering to take on the role of mediator between the gangs.
2	2	"Dead, Like a Lost Dream"	Leonard Horn	Larry Brody	September 18, 1972
The Internal Affairs department is getting reports of police shakedowns. Among the accused are Officer Webster and some of his classmates from the Police Academy's recent graduating class. After the investigation begins, Lt. Ryker receives an anonymous phone call claiming detailed proof of the corruption in his squad; when he arrives to meet the accuser, he is shot.
3	3	"The Informant"	Leonard Horn	Robert I. Holt	September 25, 1972
While doing routine automobile spot checks, Webster and Gillis uncover a petty thief involved in a larger fur robbery ring. The man agrees to provide information to help convict the two men who orchestrated the scheme. However, due to a technicality, the trial is dismissed and the men set their eyes on revenge.
4	4	"The Commitment"	Michael Caffey	Hoke Howell & Rance Howard	October 2, 1972
After being shot and paralyzed by a robber, Willie must decide whether or not to enter into a dangerous surgical procedure to remove the bullet. In addition, his fiancée Nancy struggles with her commitment not only to a man who may be paralyzed for life, but also to the sacrifices required of a police officer's wife.
5	5	"Covenant with Death"	Leonard Horn	Story by : David P. Harmon & Skip Webster; Teleplay by : Skip Webster	October 9, 1972
When Webster and Gillis have to serve Brother Toby Jones, a former drug addict turned evangelist, with his fourth disturbing the peace complaint, Brother Toby solicits Webster's help in obtaining a grant that will keep his congregation from being evicted. Despite Lt. Ryker's warnings, he agrees to help. Shortly thereafter, Gillis spots Toby at the site of heroin raid. After he is brought in for questioning and booked, Webster and Gillis post bail for him, only to see Toby immediately shot and seriously wounded outside his church.
6	6	"Time Is the Fire"	Earl Bellamy	Story by : Mark Weingart; Teleplay by : Mark Weingart & William Blinn	October 16, 1972
A man disguised as a police officer kidnaps Andrea Sloan, the daughter of a wealthy family, and demands $200,000 in ransom. As the case unfolds, Danko, Webster and Gillis become concerned for an out of sorts Lt. Ryker, who exhibits an unusually short temper and repeated loss of balance. While hospitalized for tests, the Lieutenant confides in Jill that he likely has a very special connection to the kidnapped girl.
7	7	"The Bear That Didn't Get Up"	Jud Taylor	Story by : Ron Bishop; Teleplay by : William Blinn	October 23, 1972
During a robbery, Webster and Gillis pursue fleeing suspects. Believing he is being fired on, Gillis returns fire, gravely wounding an unarmed teenager, who later dies on the operating table. While on mandatory leave, Gillis begins receiving anonymous calls telling him that he did not kill the young man, which leads the team to investigate.
8	8	"Dirge for Sunday"	Leonard Horn	Story by : Jaron Summers; Teleplay by : Jaron Summers & William Blinn	October 30, 1972
The Rookies are assigned the task of protecting a valuable witness. When a professional killer disguised as a professor is denied visitation by Danko, he later kidnaps Danko and forces him to wear explosives in the hopes of trading the officer's life for that of the witness.
9	9	"The Good Die Young"	Earl Bellamy	Skip Webster	November 13, 1972
When three single women are murdered, Webster and Gillis go undercover with two female officers at a singles apartment complex. The female officers serve as bait and Webster and Gillis as their protectors. When one of the officers is the next murder victim, the team must decide whether to end the operation or continue and risk another officer's life.
10	10	"To Taste of Terror"	Ralph Senensky	Richard H. Landau	November 20, 1972
After Officer Danko apprehends a suspect fleeing from the scene of a crime and testifies against him, the suspect's brother — who eluded capture fleeing from the same crime — begins to terrorize Jill in order to force Danko to change his testimony.
11	11	"A Deadly Velocity"	Jerry Jameson	Hal Sitowitz	November 27, 1972
The Rookies are given the task of protecting a controversial Army General who has recently returned to the country after serving in Vietnam. The officers must deal with mob control, as well as actively track down a sniper who hits the General. The most valuable clue is an old army rifle, used in the General's shooting, whose owner the Rookies must uncover.
12	12	"A Bloody Shade of Blue"	E.W. Swackhamer	William Blinn	December 11, 1972
The police squadron has a new terror on their hands: two snipers who are shooting indiscriminately at anyone who is dressed in a uniform. Terry Webster, who unfortunately loses his eyesight, is their most recent target.
13	13	"A Very Special Piece of Ground"	William F. Claxton	Skip Webster	December 18, 1972
Easy Wyatt is a cop with many years behind him on the force. His ranch has recently been the target of destruction in a new plan to build a freeway. Wyatt is becoming mentally unstable, and his instability is slowly spiraling deeper and deeper. Once the best officer in the squad, Wyatt's shaky state is evident when he attempts to prevent the bulldozers from digging by holding them at gunpoint.
14	14	"Rabbits on the Runway"	Jerry Jameson	William Blinn	December 25, 1972
The Rookies are on the hunt for a runaway girl. Their strongest clue to solving the case is a tattooed foot. However, they are missing a vital piece of information: the man who claims to be the girl's father is actually the one who is out to murder her, and is the cause for her self-imposed disappearance.
15	15	"Tarnished Idol"	Gene Nelson	Skip Webster	January 8, 1973
A teenaged friend of Willie's is shot at while parking Willie's patrol car; the car becomes engulfed in flames. Willie shoots at the killers' car as he flees. It is later revealed that Willie's friend died from a gunshot, not the fire. Willie is accused of shooting his friend in a mercy killing, jeopardizing his job and his friendship with the boy's family.
16	16	"Crossfire"	Leonard Horn	James Basler	January 15, 1973
In their off-duty time, the Rookies become involved in a camp for deviant, delinquent children and adolescents. Because of their involvement, the community's view regarding them and the police force as a whole is at risk.
17	17	"Snow Job"	Ralph Senensky	Robert I. Holt	January 29, 1973
A junkie addicted to dope sets his eye on swiping $82M worth of cocaine which has been confiscated. He will soon find that his plan is confronted with complications; the police have tagged the drugs for disposal in the ocean.
18	18	"Point of Impact"	Gene Nelson	William Douglas Lansford	February 5, 1973
An old friend of Terry Webster's unleashes an attack on a patrol car officer. Webster investigates further to try and discover the logic behind the seemingly nonsensical incident.
19	19	"Three Hours to Kill"	Michael Caffey	Hal Sitowitz	February 12, 1973
A daring plan is crafted by a convict's wife to release a prisoner from incarceration: an innocent and helpless police officer, who is undergoing surgery, is taken hostage. The rest of the medical staff in the operating room is also put at risk, including Mike Danko's wife Jill.
20	20	"The Wheel of Death"	Michael Caffey	Mark Weingart	February 19, 1973
An extremely ill young boy is desperately waiting for a suitable bone marrow donor; without a transplant, he will die shortly. However, the biggest obstacle is that the boy's father, who has compatible marrow and is the only possible donor, is currently on the run. He is trying to evade the police as well as the syndicate.
21	21	"Life Robbery"	E.W. Swackhamer	Donald L. Stewart	February 26, 1973
The Rookies try to disengage a robbery network by leaving the undesirable city slums and working in the suburbs. They discover that the main suspect is a dear old friend of Lt. Ryker's. The man is also a special security guard of the community.
22	22	"A Farewell Tree from Marly"	Harry Falk	William Blinn	March 5, 1973
The Rookies are presented with a "difficult" court case. While the case is essentially an open-and-shut, obvious manslaughter conviction, trouble arises: the most important element in the conviction, the only witness, is discovered to have an intellectual disability.
23	23	"Easy Money"	Lou Antonio	Hoke Howell & Robert Harland	March 19, 1973
The Rookies may be confronted with a problem worse than the nurse who holds a grudge against all police officers: they discover that her younger brother is associating with thugs who are the organizers of a current neighborhood protection racket.

=== Season 2 (1973–74) ===
No. overall	No. in season	Title	Directed by	Written by	Original release date
24	1	"Cauldron"	Harry Falk	Webb Morris & William Blinn	September 10, 1973
Willie and Terry are kidnapped by a disturbed criminal who is dying. The criminal leaves the two Rookies in the desert, abandoned, with no food source and little hope of being rescued. John Saxon guest stars
25	2	"Margin for Error"	Harry Falk	Hoke Howell & Robert Harland	September 17, 1973
During a routine patrol, Gillis and Danko unexpectedly stumble upon a robbery in progress. They radio for additional support, and a veteran police team arrives at the crime scene; one of the veteran policemen is killed, and his partner blames Danko. The veteran policeman suggests that Danko be appointed to ride with him, a suggestion that turns out to have almost catastrophic results.
26	3	"Deadly Cage"	Leonard Horn	Hal Sitowitz	September 24, 1973
Webster is asked to play the role of a prisoner at the State Prison; he disguises himself as an inmate, in an effort to aid the issue of prison reform. However, when the other prisoners discover that Webster is merely pretending to be a fellow inmate, pandemonium results.
27	4	"Frozen Smoke"	Harry Falk	Robert I. Holt	October 1, 1973
Juvenile detail is typically known to be a relatively easy tour; however, this is not the case for Willie. While on juvenile detail, Willie discovers that he is not as emotionally strong as he once thought. He is presented with pain and death, in amounts that are greater than he can manage.
28	5	"Get Ryker"	Leonard Horn	William Douglas Lansford	October 8, 1973
Danko's wife Jill is assigned to protect Lt. Ryker after he is wounded by a former prisoner who wants revenge. However, Ryker decides to take charge of the situation when Jill's life is at stake.
29	6	"Cry Wolf"	Harry Falk	William Blinn	October 15, 1973
A lonely lady who resides by the beach places a call to the police station for aid. Willie and Terry ignore this routine call, only to find out that the call was legitimate and the woman has been robbed and beaten. The Rookies are then thrown into a peculiar series of robberies.
30	7	"A Matter of Justice" "Justice for Jill Danko"	E.W. Swackhamer	Hal Sitowitz	October 22, 1973
Jill Danko is seriously wounded by a seemingly demented gunman while dining with her husband Mike. Later, they find out that the gunman cannot be prosecuted in court, because he is suffering from a brain tumor which appears to be the cause of his actions. The Rookies take it upon themselves to prove that the man is dangerous and can place society in jeopardy.
31	8	"Blood Brother"	E.W. Swackhamer	Robert I. Holt	October 29, 1973
Like many Vietnam veterans returning home after the war, Jimmy Webster is angry at society for treating him as if he was an outsider and not openly accepting him. He is unable to find employment and is left with an important decision to make: either he can fall back on his cousin, Officer Terry Webster, and turn to him for support, or he can join a robbery operation and make a large amount of money.
32	9	"Code 261"	William F. Claxton	Hal Sitowitz & Robert Heverly	November 5, 1973
A young nurse suffers a terrifying ordeal when she is raped in the underground garage of Memorial Hospital. The Rookies attempt to help the woman by offering support. They offer encouragement and assistance as the woman proceeds through the legal formalities which often are unsympathetic to, and sometimes humiliate, the rape victim.
33	10	"Prayers Unanswered, Prayers Unheard"	Leonard Horn	William Blinn	November 12, 1973
Lt. Ryker is selected to be personally in charge of an important investigation: a priest is murdered and a nun is badly beaten in a destitute neighborhood, and the community worries that religious restlessness with arise. As the investigation progresses, the Rookies uncover a completely different motive.
34	11	"Down Home Boy"	Leonard Horn	Paul Savage	November 19, 1973
A telethon featuring an extremely famous country/western singer requests extra police protection; the Rookies are assigned to the event. They find themselves protecting the singer from a couple of bitter and unforgiving country folk from Tennessee. The hillbillies hold the singer responsible for the death of their sister, who died while she was giving birth.
35	12	"Lots of Trees and a Running Stream"	Alvin Ganzer	Don Balluck	December 3, 1973
Jill is confronted by her past when a former lover of hers appears at her home. Mike is currently out of town. The unanticipated visitor gives the impression that he is fatally ill, thereby luring Jill into becoming involved with him, despite her uncertainty. Only after a period of time does Jill realize the great lengths to which this former lover will go to try to get her back and claim her as his own.
36	13	"Another Beginning for Ben Fuller"	E.W. Swackhamer	Sandor Stern	December 10, 1973
A retired police lieutenant interferes in the investigation of an aggravated assault involving his best friend.
37	14	"Sound of Silence"	Richard Newton	Richard H. Landau	December 17, 1973
One of Willie's young female friends is desperately afraid when she discovers that she is afflicted with diabetes. After she makes the realization, the young woman flees to a drug rehabilitation center, to be around the other young people whom she trusts. However, she neglects to bring her insulin.
38	15	"Trial by Doubt"	Richard Newton	James Basler	January 7, 1974
Willie Gillis is assigned to ride with an older officer and, while on patrol, the man is killed. When the murderer is captured, the other policemen are inclined to take the law into their own hands. Falsely accused of incompetence, Willie is forced to search his soul to arrive at justice.
39	16	"The Authentic Death of Billy Stomper"	Gene Nelson	Robert I. Holt	January 14, 1974
A college girl from Jamaica witnesses the murder of a notorious drug pusher, and Terry Webster is assigned to get her testimony. In the days that follow, they fall in love, but the girl is tracked down by the murderer and killed. Terry uses himself as a decoy to trap the killers.
40	17	"The Late Mr. Brent"	Gene Nelson	Sy Salkowitz	January 28, 1974
Mike and Jill Danko's marriage is strained by Mike's protective interest in the widow of a man he was forced to kill in the line of duty.
41	18	"The Teacher"	Gene Nelson	Robert I. Holt	February 4, 1974
The Rookies must contend with "The Teacher," an ex-convict who masterminds several well-executed robberies using the young boys who are in the city looking for excitement.
42	19	"Eyewitness"	Barry Shear	Frank Telford	February 11, 1974
A young man with a Jekyll/Hyde personality becomes a puzzle for Terry and Willie when he gives them a description of a suspected cop-killer. But for Mike and Ryker he poses a different problem: extreme danger.
43	20	"Something Less Than a Man"	Philip Leacock	Irv Pearlberg	February 18, 1974
An old friend of Ryker's, once a good policeman and now a pathetic drunk, is framed for the murder of a gangster who has terrorized the neighborhood. To gain favor from his daughter and neighbors, he pleads guilty, but Lt. Ryker, with the help of the Rookies, finds a better way to give the man back his dignity.
44	21	"Rolling Thunder"	Edward M. Abroms	James Basler & William Blinn	February 25, 1974
The Ludlow precinct institutes a Police Cadet Program. One of the boys involved becomes overzealous and is kidnapped, along with Terry, by his sister's boyfriend who is a fugitive.
45	22	"Time Lock"	Lee Philips	Daniel B. Ullman	March 4, 1974
A brilliant young felon holds Terry and three women, one of whom is pregnant, hostage in a bank vault in order to free his partner from jail.
46	23	"Death Watch"	Philip Leacock	Story by : Alvin Boretz; Teleplay by : Alvin Boretz and Hal Sitowitz	March 18, 1974
Two ex-convicts are loose in the city, carrying contagious meningitis. After Willie is exposed to it (when he gives one of them mouth-to-mouth resuscitation), the other Rookies are given the task of finding the men and stopping a possible epidemic.

=== Season 3 (1974–75) ===
No. overall	No. in season	Title	Directed by	Written by	Original release date
47	1	"An Ugly Way to Die"	Harry Falk	Hal Sitowitz	September 9, 1974
Terry Webster breaks in his new partner, junior rookie Chris Owens, searching for an arsonist. Someone is responsible for the murder of several firemen, all young, dark-haired and mustached.
48	2	"Key Witness"	Phil Bondelli	James Schmerer	September 23, 1974
The murder of a construction company owner is witnessed by a woman and her married boyfriend, a doctor. Because of the possibility of a scandal, the doctor will not allow the girl to give information to the Rookies. They do not know that the killers are now after the witnesses.
49	3	"Legacy of Death"	E.W. Swackhamer	Skip Webster	September 30, 1974
Chris is partnered with a patrolman who gets involved in suicidal situations so that he might be killed in the line of duty and his family would be secure with financial compensation.
50	4	"Death at 6 A.M."	Harry Falk	Don Balluck	October 7, 1974
Four young people out for excitement in a stolen pickup become fugitives from the law when their fun turns into murder and robbery. Rookie Chris Owens is on the case after his partner is killed, but Chris wonders whether the dangers of police life are worth it.
51	5	"Walk a Tightrope"	Alexander Grasshoff	Mann Rubin	October 21, 1974
Two law students, seeking revenge for the death of a girl, frame Terry Webster, whom they hold responsible for the murder of a store guard.
52	6	"Judgement"	Phil Bondelli	Parke Perine	October 28, 1974
The son and daughter of a man who recently died in prison are determined to kill the judge who sentenced him. The Rookies must guard the judge and find the criminals. Terry becomes their next target when he prevents their plans for the judge.
53	7	"Johnny Lost His Gun"	E.W. Swackhamer	Irv Pearlberg	November 4, 1974
Mike is alarmed to find out, from his wife and fellow Rookies, that an old Air Force friend of his is a heroin pusher.
54	8	"Prelude to Vengeance"	Phil Bondelli	Skip Webster	November 11, 1974
The Rookies befriend the girlfriend of a robber after Terry delivers her baby and in return becomes the criminal's target. Unless the Rookies can catch this man, the girl will be charged with the robbery.
55	9	"Vendetta"	Phil Bondelli	Sean Baine	November 18, 1974
A policeman who was injured in a market holdup returns to the force after a ten-year recovery, in pursuit of the man he thinks is responsible for shooting him.
56	10	"The Old Neighborhood"	E.W. Swackhamer	Daniel B. Ullman	November 25, 1974
Lt. Ryker steps from behind his desk to investigate a protection racket in the neighborhood where he grew up.
57	11	"A Test of Courage"	William Crain	Rick Husky	December 2, 1974
The Rookies must find those responsible for holding up gun shops throughout the city.
58	12	"The Assassin"	Phil Bondelli	Frank Telford	December 9, 1974
A photographer friend of Chris' accidentally catches a hired assassin in one of her shots. The Rookies must protect the girl and at the same time figure out whom this man is trying to assassinate.
59	13	"Blue Christmas"	Bruce Bilson	Aaron Spelling	December 16, 1974
It is Christmas Eve and after settling a number of routine disturbances around town, the Rookies enjoy a Christmas dinner at the home of Jill and Mike Danko. Jill and Mike are also entertaining their niece who is upset over her parents' separation.
60	14	"Take Over"	E.W. Swackhamer	Bruce Shelly & David Ketchum	December 30, 1974
After a syndicate boss is arrested, the rest of the gang plot to take over and continue their work. They are intent on killing Lt. Ryker. The Rookies must put the rest of this gang behind bars.
61	15	"The Saturday Night Special"	Phil Bondelli	Robert I. Holt	January 13, 1975
The dangers of owning a gun are explored when the rookies have to avenge the accidental shooting of a man who bought a gun to protect his family.
62	16	"The Hunting Ground"	Bruce Bilson	Don Balluck	January 20, 1975
Mike's eager new partner proves to be a little too eager when he is found spending his off-hours hunting for pushers because his younger brother died of an overdose.
63	17	"Solomon's Dilemma"	E.W. Swackhamer	Don Carlos Dunaway	January 27, 1975
A woman's son is kidnapped in a supermarket parking lot, but when questioned by the Rookies she denies the entire incident. She and her husband are afraid because they adopted the boy illegally and the kidnappers are the natural parents.
64	18	"Angel"	Bruce Bilson	Story by : Gerry Day and Bethel Leslie; Teleplay by : Don Balluck	February 3, 1975
The rookies must find ample evidence to arrest Tommy, who introduces young girls into unsavory careers for monetary gain.
65	19	"The Shield"	Fernando Lamas	Richard Danus	February 10, 1975
The Rookies are involved in a case of mistaken identity when they charge the wrong man with the murder of a policeman.
66	20	"S.W.A.T."	E.W. Swackhamer	Robert Hamner	February 17, 1975
67	21	"S.W.A.T."	E.W. Swackhamer	Robert Hamner	February 17, 1975
Harrelson is the head of the Special Weapons and Tactics team, a unit trained to handle unusually volatile situations. His hard-nosed attitude about police work irks Rookie Terry Webster. This two-hour episode was the pilot for the spinoff series S.W.A.T.
68	22	"A Deadly Image"	Phil Bondelli	Mann Rubin	February 24, 1975
A look into Lt. Ryker's more sensitive side has him befriending a young, mixed-up girl who reminds him of the daughter he was forced to give up for adoption. The girl's boyfriend persuades her to use her friendship with Ryker for his criminal gain.
69	23	"Cliffy"	Georg Stanford Brown	Mark Slade	March 3, 1975
A intellectually disabled man, who longs to be a policeman, witnesses a murder in a gas station. But he has difficulty informing the police of what he saw.
70	24	"Nightmare"	Phil Bondelli	Rick Husky	March 17, 1975
Kate Jackson takes center stage in this thriller-styled episode. After being involved in a car accident on a stormy night, an injured Jill becomes the prisoner of a disturbed man who claims to be a doctor.

=== Season 4 (1975–76) ===
No. overall	No. in season	Title	Directed by	Written by	Original release date
71	1	"Lamb to the Slaughter"	William Crain	Skip Webster	September 9, 1975
When burglar Brad Gifford is arrested, his cop-hating, now orphaned son, Jody, is taken to Lambert Hall where he is befriended by Ryker, a former orphan himself. Jody is just beginning to trust and like Ryker when his father escapes custody and comes for him.
72	2	"Reading, Writing and Angel Dust"	Phil Bondelli	Sean Baine	September 16, 1975
After the tragic death of a bright high school student, the Rookies put in a team effort to get the pushers off the school campus. They get some help from a pusher who is pretending to scorch for the source.
73	3	"One-Way Street to Nowhere"	Georg Stanford Brown	Mathias Reitz	September 23, 1975
Mike is critically injured when he tries to capture the leader of a militant group and Terry is taken hostage.
74	4	"Someone Who Cares"	Ivan Dixon	Robert I. Holt	September 30, 1975
An unidentified girl is accidentally hit by a car after two hedonistic "swinging single" men spike her lunch with narcotics. Before she dies, she begs Terry for help. Terry, reluctant to let her die a Jane Doe, investigates.
75	5	"Ladies Day" "Ladies Kill, Too"	Fernando Lamas	Daniel B. Ullman	October 7, 1975
Jill Danko is working in a women's prison, fighting an outbreak of diphtheria. In order to protest for better food and working conditions, inmates take Jill and Dr. Malcolm hostage.
76	6	"Reign of Terror"	Fernando Lamas	Skip Webster	October 14, 1975
Young crooks Pat Stevens and Glen Barton rob ticket agent Brewster and shoot rookie Chris. The scene is witnessed by mailman Charlie Brooks, who is adamant about not getting involved. Eventually his wife Nadine and daughter Stacy encourage him to cooperate with the Rookies, and finally the criminals are apprehended.
77	7	"Death Lady"	Phil Bondelli	Don Balluck	October 21, 1975
A female officer is blamed for her partner's death during a jewelry store robbery. With her new partner, Mike, she sets out to solve the crime and prove her worth to the police department.
78	8	"Measure of Mercy"	Phil Bondelli	Robert I. Holt	October 28, 1975
The Rookies must investigate a robbery at Memorial Hospital. The blood bank was robbed and its contents sold to the black market, leaving an infant at the hospital on the critical list.
79	9	"A Time to Mourn"	Gerald S. O'Loughlin	Skip Webster	November 4, 1975
Chris' sister makes a surprise visit on her brother. He is suspended after conducting an unauthorized bust of the man who molested her.
80	10	"The Torch Man" "The Institutional Man"	Georg Stanford Brown	Skip Webster	November 11, 1975
An ex-convict out on parole desperately wants to go straight, but is sought after by his ex-cellmates to use his safe-cracking abilities in a robbery.
81	11	"Invitation to a Rumble"	George McCowan	Skip Webster	November 18, 1975
Terry is run down by a car driven by the leader of a street gang in his old neighborhood. When one of the members of the gang is overheard calling for an ambulance, he is forced to kill Terry or he will be killed by the gang for betrayal.
82	12	"Reluctant Hero"	Fernando Lamas	Jock MacKelvie	November 25, 1975
A rookie accidentally overpowers a professional assassin and is named "hero." The assassin vows to kill the rookie and escapes with Jill as a hostage, offering to exchange her for the rookie.
83	13	"Dead Heat" "Death at Midnight"	Phil Bondelli	David Ketchum & Bruce Shelly	December 2, 1975
Chris and Terry have their patrol car stolen by teenage vandals while investigating a major robbery in a department store, and three heavily armed killers trap them there.
84	14	"The Voice of Thunder"	Phil Bondelli	Robert I. Holt	December 9, 1975
After a series of Sunday bombings of porno bookshops and massage parlors sweep the city, Chris and Terry recognize the same girl at the scene of each incident. The dangerously schizophrenic top fashion model believes she is being instructed by a supreme being.
85	15	"The Code Five Affair"	Phil Bondelli	Don Balluck	December 16, 1975
The rookies stake out an abandoned factory where a heroin deal is about to take place, and are able to seize the drugs and arrest all but one man. This man must get the heroin back from the police.
86	16	"Shadow of a Man"	Fernando Lamas	Robert I. Holt	December 23, 1975
Forest, a tough career cop, takes $10,000 from the scene of a robbery after his partner is killed by the robbers. Lt. Ryker puts an undercover investigator on the case to retrieve the money.
87	17	"Eye for an Eye"	William Crain	Irv Pearlberg	December 30, 1975
A man who was forced to spend eighteen years in prison for a crime he did not commit is determined to get the men who framed him.
88	18	"Sudden Death" "Return from the Past"	Phil Bondelli	Jack V. Fogarty	January 6, 1976
Mike, a former helicopter pilot in Vietnam, becomes the prey of a deranged ex-POW who blames the policeman for his capture by the Vietcong.
89	19	"From Out of the Darkness"	Randal Kleiser	Rick Husky	January 20, 1976
Terry vows to find the murderer of Dan Kennedy, a retired cop turned security guard. Dan was the father of a blind girl, Terry's former girlfriend.
90	20	"The Mugging"	Richard Benedict	Jack V. Fogarty	January 27, 1976
After a woman is fatally assaulted by three junkies, her son, a doctor in the same hospital where Jill works, announces his intention to get revenge against the three, who were released from jail on a technicality.
91	21	"Blue Movie, Blue Death"	Leon Carrere	Sean Baine	February 24, 1976
The Rookies are given undercover assignments in order to smash a syndicate-owned porno film company responsible for the deaths of some of its actors.
92	22	"Deliver Me from Innocence"	Richard Benedict	Sean Baine	March 2, 1976
A frightened sixteen-year-old boy is forced to take the blame for the crimes of a junkie he has become mixed up with. The two had committed a burglary and escaped after killing a cop. The boy is Terry's current girlfriend's brother.
93	23	"Journey to Oblivion"	Georg Stanford Brown	Skip Webster	March 30, 1976
A gambler kills his creditor and is witnessed by Jill Danko, whom he and his accomplice must now do away with.
