= Dan Tucker (lawman) =

Canadian-American lawman and gunfighter of the Old West

- Born: Dan Tucker ca. 1849; Canada
- Died: ca. 1892
- Occupations: lawman and gunfighter

Dan Tucker, better known as "Dangerous Dan" Tucker, (1849 – after 1892), is a little-known Canadian-American lawman and gunfighter of the Old West.

== Arrival in New Mexico Territory and early career ==
=== Early career and reputation ===
Tucker first ventured into New Mexico Territory in the early 1870s. Born in Canada, Tucker was said to have been soft-spoken and laconic, and with a slight accent often mistaken for being southern. Famed New Mexico sheriff Harvey Whitehill was, at the time, serving as the Grant County, New Mexico, sheriff. Whitehill first met Tucker in 1875, when the latter drifted into Silver City, New Mexico, after managing a stage station near Fort Selden. Although some were suspicious of Tucker, he was in Colorado for a time, but was rumored to have fled that state for New Mexico after stabbing a man to death. He initially introduced himself as David Tucker, but preferred to be called Dan. Whitehill took a liking to him, and hired him as a deputy sheriff.

One of the first incidents of violence in which Tucker took part after accepting his new job occurred in 1876 and was witnessed by Sheriff Whitehill's son, Wayne Whitehill, who was then a child but able to give a full account of the incident during an interview in 1949. According to him, two Mexican men began fighting inside "Johnny Ward's Dance Hall", in Silver City. One of the men stabbed the other, wounding him, then ran out into the street to escape. Just as he rounded a corner on Broadway Street, Dan Tucker shot him in the neck in full view of many citizens, the young Whitehill being one. An account of this shooting was also taken from Dan Rose, who was 12 years old at the time but also on the street that night.

Another incident, occurring in 1877 and also witnessed by Wayne Whitehill, concerned a report that a Mexican man was intoxicated and throwing rocks at people as they passed by, on a side street in Silver City. Tucker responded, with several young boys running a short distance behind, due to his being somewhat of a fascination to them and an enigma to the locals after the first shooting. According to witnesses, Tucker merely located the intoxicated man and, without ever muttering even one word to him, killed him with one shot. No charges were ever filed against Tucker for that shooting. In 1878, Tucker shot and killed a fleeing thief, as well as becoming engaged in a gunfight with three suspected horse thieves inside a Silver City saloon, killing two of the thieves and wounding the third. By this time, Tucker was legendary in the area, and had acquired the nickname "Dangerous Dan" after the shooting of the rock-throwing suspect.

=== Involvement in the Salt War ===
In late 1877, deputy sheriff Tucker was appointed captain of a company of thirty mercenary gunmen from Silver City, that were hired to fight for Charles Kerber of the "Salt Ring", the sheriff of El Paso County, in the Salt War. The mining interests funding them were interested in a reliable supply of salt for refining their silver ore. Included among the company members was the outlaw John Kinney. Tucker's unit along with elements of the Texas Rangers and U.S. Army was involved in fighting at San Elezario where suspected members of the Mexican "mob" of the "Anti-Salt Ring" there were killed and a large portion of the population fled across the border into Mexico. After being stationed for a time at Ysleta, the mercenaries were disbanded. Tucker resumed being a deputy sheriff.

=== Later incidents ===
In 1878, although remaining a deputy sheriff, Tucker had accepted the position of Silver City Marshal, the town's first, and a position he would hold through several terms. By later accounts, Tucker brought the town's violent crime rate under control quickly, and was feared due to his lack of hesitation when he deemed violence was necessary to solve a problem. By newspaper accounts from the Grant City Herald, in November 1878 Tucker was shot and wounded during a shootout with cowboy Caprio Rodriguez, when the latter resisted arrest following a disturbance in a saloon. Tucker killed Rodriguez in the exchange.

In early May, 1880, Sheriff Whitehill dispatched Deputy Tucker to track down two suspects who had broken into a prospector's cabin and stolen numerous goods and personal property. Tucker was gone for two days, then returned with all the stolen property, along with the horses, saddles, and weapons of the two suspects. He reported to Sheriff Whitehill that he had located the two on a ranch and killed them, with the owner of the ranch agreeing to bury them. Days later, Tucker responded to a domestic dispute, during which a man had clubbed his wife and child to near death. As Tucker entered the house, the man knocked Tucker's gun from his hand with the club. In the altercation that followed, Tucker was able recover his gun from the floor and shot the man, killing him.

In 1881, Tucker assisted Sheriff Whitehill in a double hanging, had previously acted as the hangman in several other hangings for Grant County, and later accepted the position of Marshal for Shakespeare, New Mexico; in September, he shot and killed rustler Jake Bond. In November, 1881, he arrested outlaw Sandy King after he shot and wounded a storekeeper. On November 9, 1881, he captured outlaw "Russian Bill" Tattenbaum for cattle rustling. The two were hanged by the town's "Vigilance Committee" that same day.

Tucker was sent to Deming, New Mexico, on November 27, 1881, due to several outlaws causing disturbances and basically taking over the town. He began patrolling the streets with a double-barrel shotgun and within three days, according to journalist C.M. Chase who was in the area doing a story on the Southern Pacific Railroad, Tucker shot and killed three men and wounded two more. In 1882, James H. Cook became the manager of the "WS Ranch" and later would comment Tucker was, to his personal knowledge, involved in several gunfights as a shotgun rider while working for Wells Fargo.

== Controversial shooting ==
During 1882, Tucker became involved in the most controversial shooting of his career. On August 24, James D. Burns, who worked as a deputy in the mining camp of Paschal, in Grant County, entered the "Walcott & Mills Saloon". Burns became intoxicated, and began twirling and flaunting his pistol. Deputy Cornelius A. Mahoney attempted to disarm Burns, but he refused, saying that as a law officer he was entitled to retain his weapon. Town Marshal Glaudius W. Moore also threatened to arrest Burns, but he ignored him and continued on his drinking binge, going from saloon to saloon.

The following afternoon, Burns, whose binge had resulted in him staying up all night with no sleep, found himself in the "Sam Eckstein Saloon", where he goaded Bob Kerr into a fight, but when Burns produced his pistol, Kerr fled. Burns then left that saloon and walked down in front of the "Centennial Saloon", where he began firing his pistol in the air. He then entered the saloon and began gambling with Frank Thurmond, a professional gambler. Marshal Moore entered shortly thereafter, due to several people complaining about Burns.

He approached Burns as he was seated at the table, and demanded he come outside to speak with him. Burns refused, stating he had done nothing and would not leave until the game was finished. Marshal Moore again ordered him up, and again Burns refused. At this point, Marshal Moore produced his pistol and yet again ordered Burns outside. Also seated at the table were former deputy John W. Gilmo and Dan Tucker.

Gilmo convinced Marshal Moore to holster his pistol, but as soon as he did, Burns jumped to his feet, pulling his own pistol. Tucker then drew on Burns and ordered him to drop his gun, which he did. Marshal Moore departed to obtain an arrest warrant for Burns. After he departed, Burns began verbally confronting Tucker, stating Tucker was wrong for involving himself in the incident.

A while later, Marshal Moore returned with Deputy Bill McClellen, warrant in hand. The two lawmen then demanded Burns turn over his weapons, stating they had "papers" for him. What followed is confusing, and has never been cleared completely. Burns drew and fired, missing everyone and, despite both lawmen having their pistols unholstered, Tucker was the first to react, drawing and shooting Burns in the ribcage. The percussion of both the first two shots extinguished the lamps, thus leaving the men in the dark. Moore and McClellen then also fired on Burns, with McClellen firing one round and Moore firing four in quick succession, all hitting their mark. Burns died immediately.

A decision to file charges against McClellen and Moore was made, based mainly on the fact Burns had been extremely popular with the local miners, and there was a loud public outcry for justice, despite the shooting having been justified. Tucker was not to be charged. On September 3, 1882, an attempt by local authorities to arrest both men was made, but they refused and no one pressured them. Instead, they went to nearby Central City and surrendered to authorities there, to avoid a possible lynching in Silver City.

Tucker, although previously told he was cleared, was also arrested, and also jailed in Central City. McClellen was released on bail and, while riding after an all-night drunk, his horse threw him and he died of injuries from the fall, thus never coming to trial. Tucker and Moore were eventually cleared of the shooting, but Moore was dismissed as Marshal. Tucker's reputation suffered as a result of the shooting but Tucker himself, as those who knew him later commented, seemed to not be bothered by this. Soon after, Whitehill lost the election for Sheriff and Tucker was dismissed by his successor but continued as a Wells Fargo shotgun messenger.

On December 14, 1882, Tucker was ambushed by a Mexican man as he entered a brothel in Deming to investigate a complaint, which turned out to be false. He was shot in the shoulder, but he shot and killed one man and one of two prostitutes who were assisting in the assassination attempt. Several other Mexican men also attempted to involve themselves but backed away when several citizens entered, having heard the gunshots from the street.

== Gage train robbery, later life and disappearance ==
After Tucker recovered from his injury, he found he could not tolerate the rough ride aboard a stagecoach and got a job as Special Officer for the Southern Pacific Railroad. On November 24, 1883, Tucker led a posse, in pursuit of bandits who had derailed and robbed a train near Deming, killing the engineer and messenger near Gage Station. In November of that year, Tucker arrested Daniel "York" Kelly, an outlaw who had killed three men and murdered a woman who was eight months pregnant during the Bisbee massacre. For a time after this, Tucker operated a saloon in Deming, but in 1885 he was appointed as a Deputy US Marshal for that region. In November, 1885, he and friend William Graham were involved in a gun battle with marauding Apache warriors 11 miles west of Deming, but they were able to drive the warriors off.

Tucker had resigned his position by 1888, and moved on to California. The last time anyone who knew him saw him was in 1892, when he made his last known visit to Grant County. Where he went following that, or when or where he died, remains unknown. A 1931 newspaper article on his life, claimed he had died in a hospital in San Bernardino, California. However recent research could not find any confirmation of this.

== Legacy ==
Although little known today, Tucker is considered by some historians to have been one of the most dangerous, albeit underestimated, gunmen in the history of the Old West. Author Bob Alexander, who wrote the biography Dangerous Dan" Tucker, New Mexico's Deadly Lawman, proclaimed Tucker was more dangerous and more effective than better-known lawmen, including Wild Bill Hickok and Wyatt Earp. He was supported in this claim by historian Leon C. Metz. He was also a subject in the book Deadly Dozen, by author Robert K. DeArment, who included Tucker as one of the twelve most underrated gunmen of the Old West.
