= The Rookies =

American police procedural television series (1972–1976)

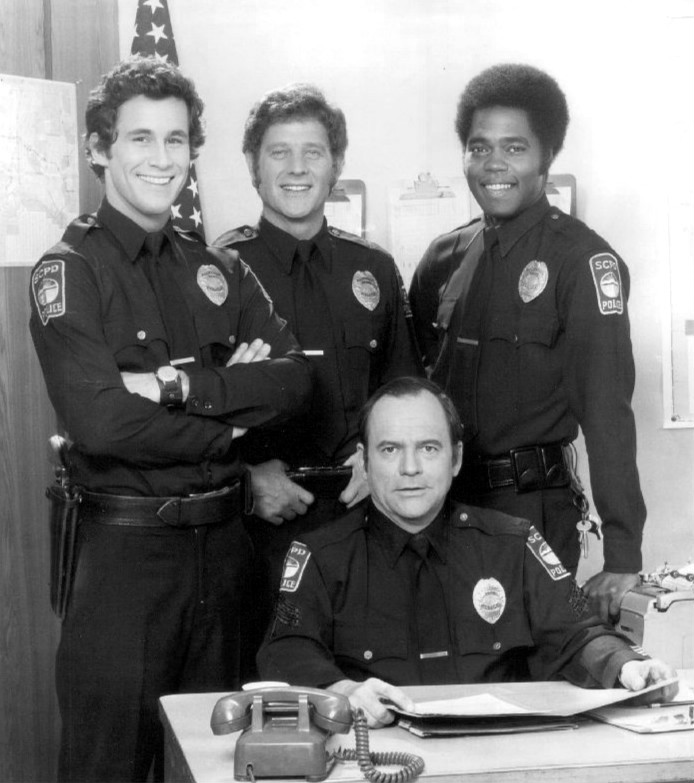
- Cast of The Rookies. Standing from left, Michael Ontkean, Sam Melville, Georg Stanford Brown. Seated, Gerald S. O'Loughlin.
- Genre: Police procedural
- Created by: Rita Lakin
- Developed by: William Blinn
- Starring: Georg Stanford Brown; Sam Melville; Michael Ontkean; Kate Jackson; Gerald S. O'Loughlin; Bruce Fairbairn
- Theme music composer: Elmer Bernstein
- Composers: Elmer Bernstein; Robert Drasnin; Jack Elliott; Allyn Ferguson; Paul Glass; Shorty Rogers; George Romanis; Laurence Rosenthal; Mark Snow; Pete Rugolo
- Country of origin: United States
- Original language: English
- No. of seasons: 4
- No. of episodes: 93 (+ pilot movie) (list of episodes)

Production
- Executive producers: Aaron Spelling; Leonard Goldberg
- Producers: Paul Junger Witt; Hal Sitowitz
- Cinematography: Archie R. Dalzell; Dennis Dalzell
- Editors: James Baiotto; Leon Carrere; Richard Malek
- Camera setup: Single-camera
- Running time: 45–48 minutes
- Production company: Spelling-Goldberg Productions

Original release
- Network: ABC
- Release: March 7, 1972 – March 30, 1976

Related
- S.W.A.T.

The Rookies is an American police procedural series created by Rita Lakin that originally aired on ABC from September 11, 1972, to March 30, 1976. It follows the exploits of three rookie police officers working in an unidentified city for the fictitious Southern California Police Department (SCPD).

== History ==
The success of Joseph Wambaugh's book The New Centurions, as well as NBC's ratings success with Adam-12, had sparked interest at the time in a more realistic depiction and storytelling of the typical uniformed police officer. Although various incidents during the late 1960s and early 1970s, particularly in California, had sparked controversy and negative feelings toward police officers in general, The Rookies tried to better humanize the character of a police officer and show the struggles that new, younger men and women (who were often Vietnam-era military veterans or college graduates) faced in their lives as law enforcement persons sworn to serve and protect the public.

The pilot for the series began as an ABC Movie of the Week airing on March 7, 1972. The TV movie features five rookies newly arrived at a police academy in southern California: cadets Jared Whitman (Robert F. Lyons), Kevin Lassiter (Jeff Pomerantz), Mike Danko (Sam Melville), William "Willie" Gillis (Michael Ontkean), and Terry Webster (Georg Stanford Brown), all coming from different backgrounds including the military, college and social work. The cadets' training sergeant was Eddie Ryker, played by Darren McGavin. In the later series, Sgt. Ryker was promoted to lieutenant and was played by Gerald S. O'Loughlin. The character of Jill Danko in the movie pilot was played by Jennifer Billingsley, but was recast for the series with Kate Jackson appearing as a registered nurse.

== Episodes ==
Season	Episodes	Originally released	
Season	Episodes	First released	Last released
Pilot movie		March 7, 1972	
1	23	September 11, 1972	March 19, 1973
2	23	September 10, 1973	March 18, 1974
3	24	September 9, 1974	March 17, 1975
4	23	September 9, 1975	March 30, 1976

The Rookies centers around three rookie officers: Danko, Webster and Gillis, and their superior officer/mentor Lieutenant Ryker. The show was produced by Aaron Spelling and Leonard Goldberg. Each episode showcased highly dramatized versions of police cases and activities, often intertwined with the off-duty lives of the officers and their wives. Danko was the only officer in the series who was married. Although filmed in and around Los Angeles, the "SCPD" badge the officers wore was said to stand for "Southern California Police Department". After the second season, Ontkean left the show, reportedly over complaints regarding the writing and storylines. Gillis was replaced by Officer Chris Owens, played by Bruce Fairbairn.

During the series' third season, a two-part episode (titled "S.W.A.T.") aired on February 17, 1975 and served as the pilot for the spin-off series S.W.A.T. The "S.W.A.T." two-part pilot aired only once on ABC, and subsequently was never part of the syndicated TV rerun package as Spelling-Goldberg decided it might confuse viewers as to which TV show it belonged. The S.W.A.T. pilot is now considered "lost".

== Cast ==
Actor	Role	Notes
Georg Stanford Brown	Officer Terry Webster	
Sam Melville	Officer Mike Danko	
Michael Ontkean	Officer Willie Gillis	(seasons 1–2)
Kate Jackson	Jill Danko	
Gerald S. O'Loughlin	Lieutenant Ed Ryker	
Bruce Fairbairn	Officer Chris Owens	(seasons 3–4)

=== Notable guest stars ===
- Claude Akins
- Edward Albert
- Herbert Anderson
- Edward Andrews
- Tom Atkins
- Malcolm Atterbury
- René Auberjonois
- Ned Beatty
- Eric Braeden
- Brooke Bundy
- Wendell Burton
- Joseph Campanella
- Darlene Carr
- John Carradine (voice only)
- Jack Colvin
- Didi Conn
- Tyne Daly (who was married to Georg Stanford Brown at the time)
- Susan Dey
- Elinor Donahue
- Jerry Douglas
- Leif Erickson
- Bill Erwin
- Shelley Fabares
- Mike Farrell
- Arthur Franz
- Victor French
- Beverly Garland
- Lorraine Gary
- Jonathan Goldsmith
- Don Gordon
- Louis Gossett Jr.
- Harold Gould
- Teresa Graves
- Robert Harland
- Christina Hart
- Richard Hatch
- Katherine Helmond
- Robyn Hilton
- Pat Hingle
- Earl Holliman
- Bo Hopkins
- Clint Howard
- Rance Howard
- Season Hubley
- David Huddleston
- Amy Irving
- Herbert Jefferson Jr.
- Don Johnson
- Joe Kapp
- William Katt
- Sally Kirkland
- Martin Kove
- Matthew Labyorteaux
- Cheryl Ladd
- Robert Lansing
- Geoffrey Lewis
- Cleavon Little
- Laurence Luckinbill, as "Larry Luckinbill"
- Arlene Martel
- Jared Martin
- Strother Martin
- Roddy McDowall
- Ralph Meeker
- Cameron Mitchell
- Belinda Montgomery
- Roger E. Mosley
- Jim Nabors
- Charles Napier
- Nick Nolte
- Glynnis O'Connor
- Michael Parks
- Larry Pennell
- Albert Popwell
- Don Porter
- Stefanie Powers (billed as Stephanie Powers)
- Dack Rambo
- Della Reese
- John Ritter
- Andrew Robinson
- Alex Rocco
- Ayn Ruymen
- Fran Ryan
- Raymond St. Jacques
- John Saxon
- Jerry Schilling
- William Shatner
- Marc Singer
- Martin Sheen
- Mark Slade
- Jeremy Slate
- Charles Martin Smith
- Jaclyn Smith
- David Soul
- Sissy Spacek
- Craig Stevens
- Robin Strasser
- Austin Stoker
- Don Stroud
- Olive Sturgess
- Bo Svenson
- Kristoffer Tabori
- Vic Tayback
- Linda Thompson
- John Travolta
- Lurene Tuttle
- Dick Van Patten
- Abe Vigoda
- Robert Walden
- Ray Walston
- Red West
- David White
- Fred Williamson
- William Windom
- James Woods
- Keenan Wynn
- Tony Young

== Syndication ==
In September 1974, Spelling-Goldberg Productions and Worldvision Enterprises (who previously distributed programming produced by Spelling and ABC in the syndication market) signed a contract giving Worldvision exclusive distribution rights to the series for 25 years. However, Worldvision backed out of the contract in May 1975, and in 1976, Spelling-Goldberg sued Worldvision for more than $5.6 million in damages, plus "general damages for fraud to be ascertained". Viacom Enterprises would then acquire distribution rights to The Rookies in the place of Worldvision, for broadcast beginning in 1977; as Viacom intended to sell the program for broadcast during Family Viewing Hour, they elected to edit out portions that they deemed too violent for family viewing. In addition, five episodes were excluded from the original syndicated run, due to their overt violent content. Viacom also offered local stations the option to air either the condensed 30-minute episodes or the regular, full length 60-minute episodes.

The same year Viacom assumed distribution of The Rookies in 1977, Spelling-Goldberg sold their production company to Columbia Pictures Television, which would take over syndication of The Rookies following the expiration of Viacom's contract. Sony Pictures Television, who owns most of Spelling-Goldberg's output, is the current distributor.

The series was seen in reruns on TV Land in 2003. In 2014, the show aired on Grit weekday mornings (though sometimes preempted by movies). In 2016, the show aired on FamilyNet (now The Cowboy Channel) six days a week.

The series began on Heroes & Icons network in March 2021, airing overnights on Saturdays until its removal a few years later.

The Rookies aired on May 29 and 30, 2021 on Decades as part of "The Decades Binge".

As of June, 2026, the series is available for streaming on The Roku Channel.

It made its début on cable channel FETV with a "Red, White and the Blue" welcome marathon on July 6, before officially joining the lineup on July 7, 2025, currently airing weekends at 3:10am ET.

== Home media ==
On July 17, 2007, Sony Pictures Home Entertainment released the complete first season on DVD in Region 1 for the very first time. The original pilot film was not included as part of this release.

On August 7, 2012 Shout Factory released the complete second season on DVD in Region 1.

DVD name	Ep #	Release date
The Complete First Season	24	July 17, 2007
The Complete Second Season	23	August 7, 2012
