= Shakespeare, New Mexico =

Ghost town in New Mexico, United States

- Shakespeare Ghost Town
- U.S. National Register of Historic Places
- U.S. Historic district
- NM State Register of Cultural Properties
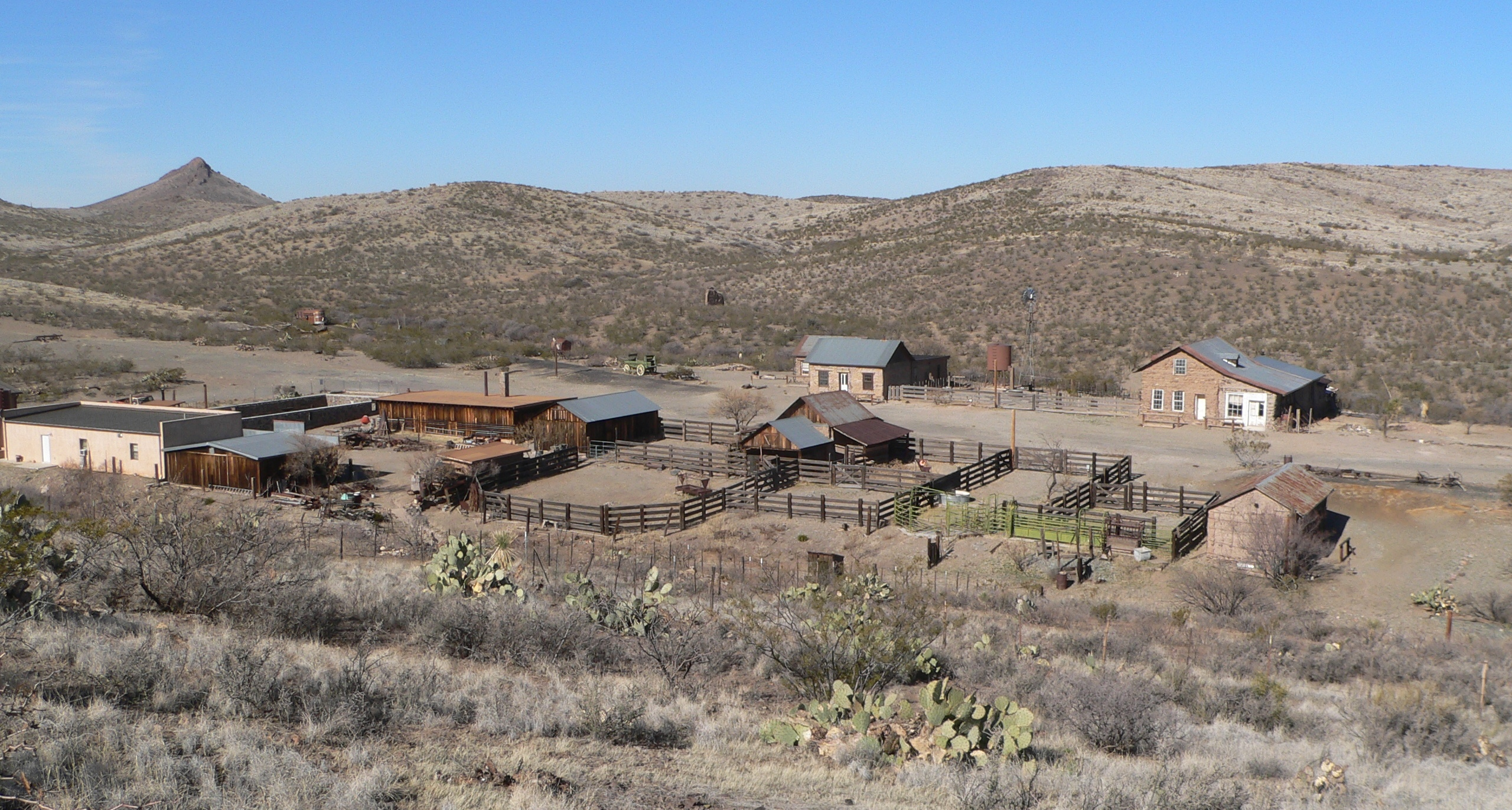
- Shakespeare in 2012, seen from the hill to the southeast.

- Location within New Mexico Location within the United States
- Location: Hidalgo County, New Mexico
- Nearest city: Lordsburg, New Mexico
- Coordinates: 32°19′32″N 108°44′18″W
- Architectural style: Greek Revival, Mexican Village
- NRHP reference No.: 73001141
- NMSRCP No.: 41

Significant dates
- Added to NRHP: July 16, 1973
- Designated NMSRCP: February 21, 1969

Shakespeare is a ghost town in Hidalgo County, New Mexico, United States. It is currently part of a privately owned ranch, sometimes open to tourists. The entire community was listed on the National Register of Historic Places in 1973.

== History ==
Founded as a rest stop called Mexican Springs along a stagecoach route, it was renamed Grant after the Civil War, after General U. S. Grant. When silver was discovered nearby it became a mining town called Ralston City, named after financier William Chapman Ralston. It was finally renamed Shakespeare, and was abandoned when the mines closed in 1929.

On November 9, 1881, Old West outlaws "Russian Bill" Tattenbaum and Sandy King, both cattle rustlers and former members of the Clanton faction of Charleston, Arizona Territory, were lynched in Shakespeare, and their bodies were left hanging for several days as a reminder to others that lawlessness would not be tolerated. The two had been captured by gunman "Dangerous Dan" Tucker, who at the time was the Shakespeare town marshal.

== Gallery ==
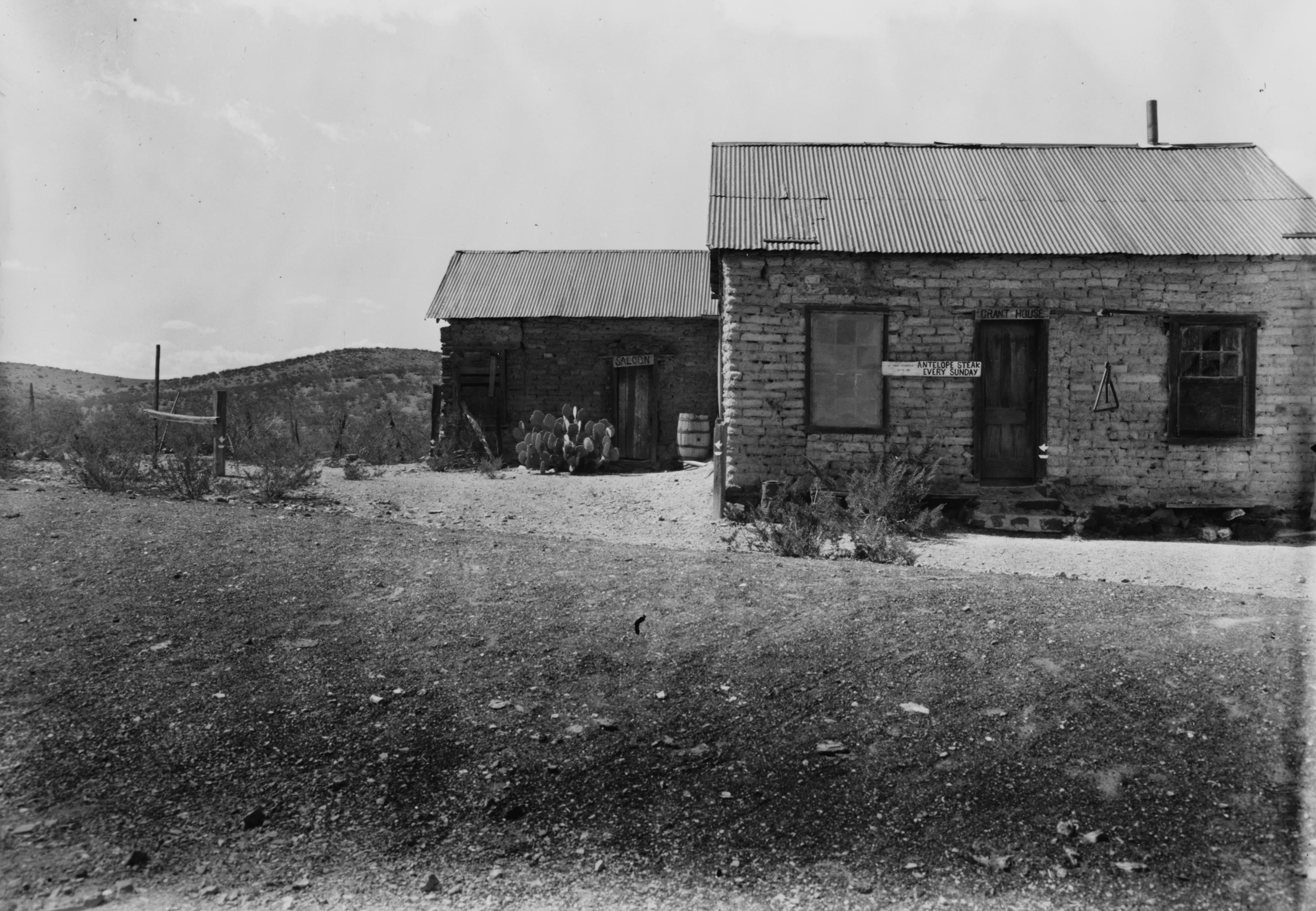
Shakespeare in 1976.

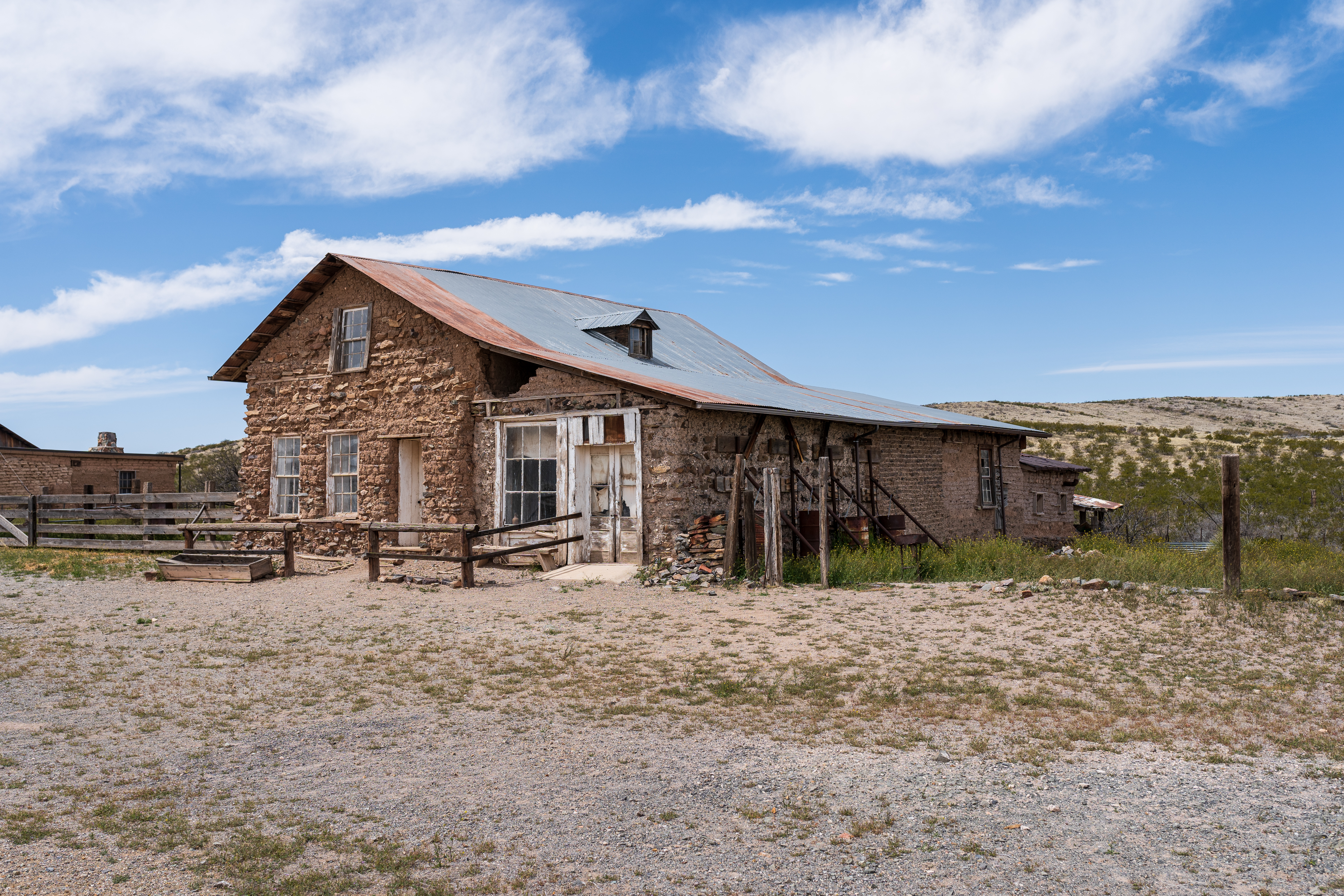
The Stafford Hotel building in 2023

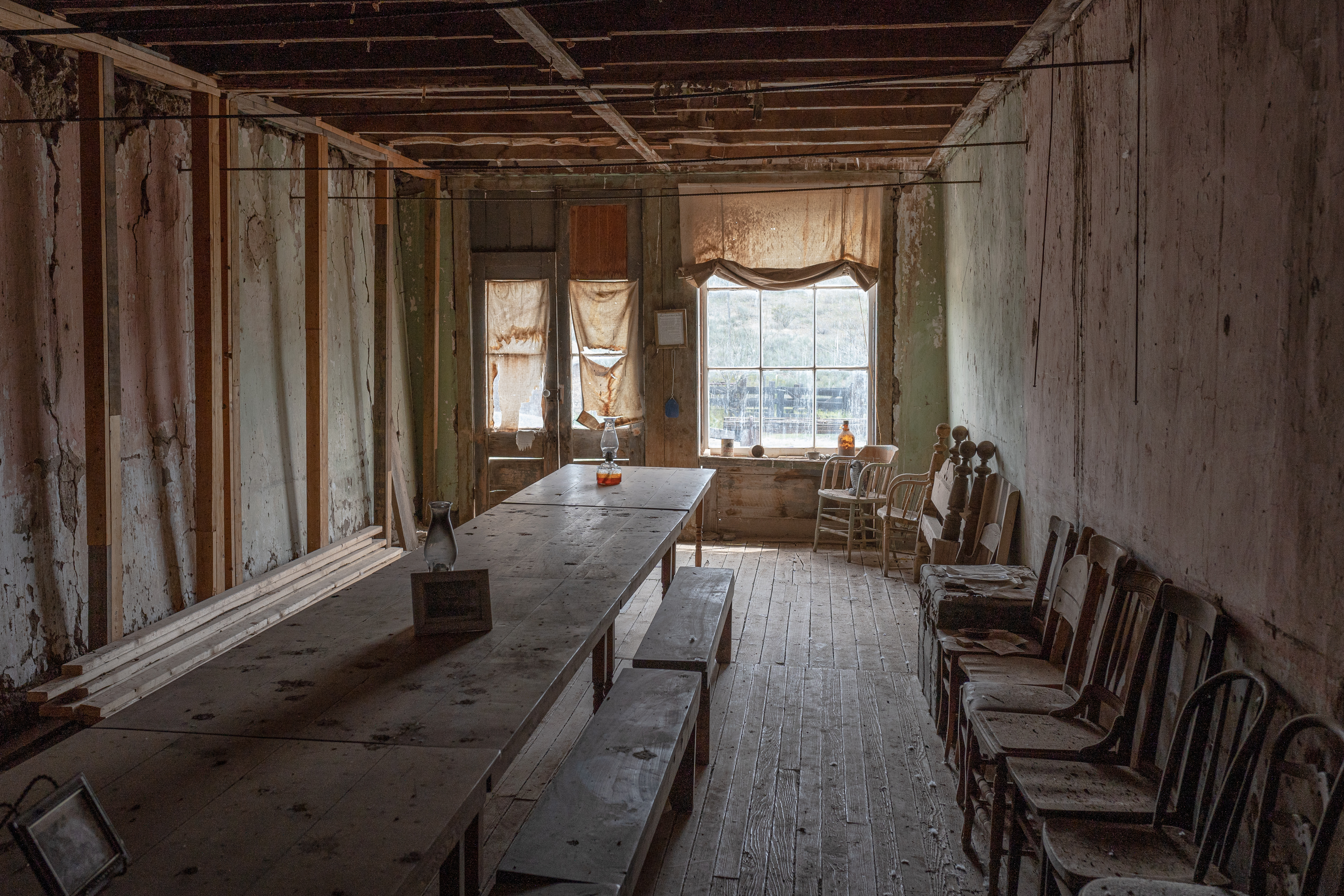
The interior dining area of the old Stafford Hotel.

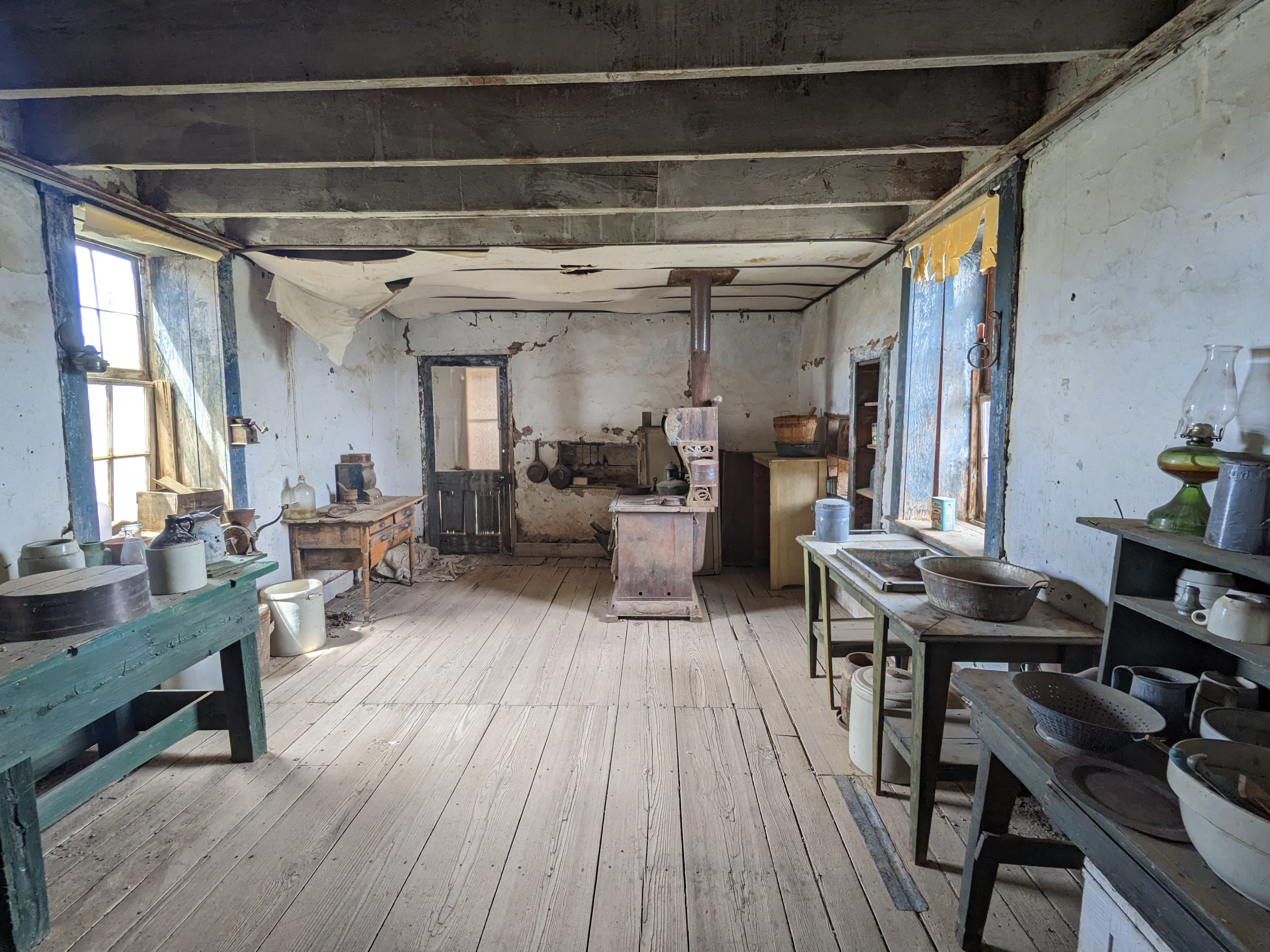
The kitchen of the old Stafford Hotel building.

== See also ==
- List of ghost towns in New Mexico
- National Register of Historic Places listings in Hidalgo County, New Mexico
