= Bruce Fairbairn (actor) =

American film and television actor

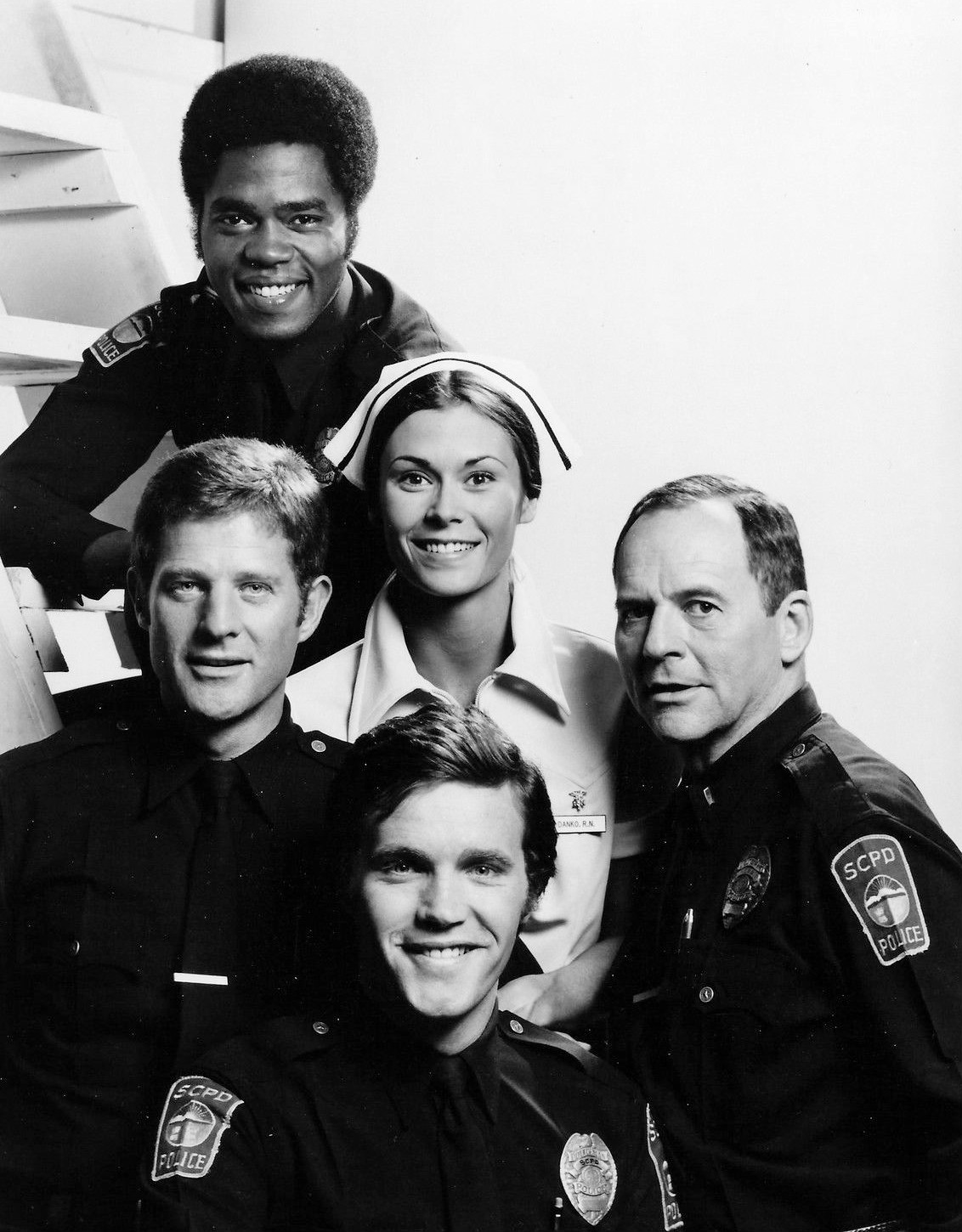
- Fairbairn (bottom center) with Georg Stanford Brown, Kate Jackson, Gerald S. O'Loughlin and Sam Melville in The Rookies, 1975
- Born: Robert Bruce Fairbairn; February 19, 1947 (age 79)
- Occupations: Film and television actor
- Years active: 1974–2000
- Spouse: Jeri Fairbairn

Robert Bruce Fairbairn (born February 19, 1947) is an American film and television actor. He is best known for playing Officer Chris Owens in the American police procedural television series The Rookies.

== Life and career ==
Fairbairn worked at a restaurant in New York City while he studied acting. He began his career in 1974, where Fairbairn succeeded departing actor Michael Ontkean on the police series The Rookies. From 1974 to 1976, he played Officer Chris Owens on the series. In August 1974, prior to starting being cast, he injured his right hand in an auto accident. The injuries were severe enough to make doctors believe he would not be able to complete filming for the season.

On September 9, 1975, he was arrested for drunk driving in Los Angeles, for which he pleaded no contest and paid a fine. After The Rookies ended in 1976, Fairbairn guest-starred in several television programs including Knight Rider, Matt Houston, Remington Steele, The Trials of Rosie O'Neill, Baywatch, The Incredible Hulk, Matlock, Simon & Simon and Charlie's Angels. He appeared in four films: Cyclone (1987), Vampire Hookers (1978) (as "Tom Buckley"), 3 Strikes (2000), and The Hanoi Hilton (1987). Returning to television, he played the recurring role of Sheldon Ganz in the legal drama L.A. Law. He also played Ray Geary on the long-running primetime soap opera Knots Landing.
