= Sandy King =

American outlaw (~1852–1881)

Sandy King (1852? – November 9, 1881) was an outlaw of the Old West, and a member of the loosely knit gang the Cowboys in Cochise County, Arizona Territory, during the period when the outlaws clashed with deputy U.S. Marshal Virgil Earp in Tombstone and the resulting Gunfight at the O.K. Corral on October 26, 1881.

== Outlaw life ==
King is believed to have been born in either Texas or Arkansas. He became associated with the Clantons in the Arizona Territory as well as other outlaws of the day involved in armed robbery and cattle rustling. About 1879, King became close friends with "Russian Bill" Tattenbaum another member of the Cowboy gang.

In early 1881, about the time when tensions between the Earps and the Clantons reached the boiling point, King left Tombstone. Tattenbaum followed him, and the two stole cattle near Shakespeare, New Mexico Territory, now a ghost town. A vigilance committee in Shakespeare was organized to combat rustlers and other outlaws. In early November 1881, King was arrested after shooting and wounding a storekeeper following a dispute. He was arrested by well-known lawman "Dangerous Dan" Tucker for stealing cattle.

On November 9, 1881, Tucker captured Tattenbaum and charged him with cattle rustling. The vigilance committee held a mock trial at the Grant Hotel and found both men guilty of rustling and for being a "general nuisance". They were sentenced to be hanged that same day. "Russian Bill" begged for his life to be spared, and King argued that there were many who had committed the same crimes but who had not been hanged. However, the vigilance committee was unyielding, the two were lynched together. Their bodies were left hanging for days as a warning to other outlaws. Prior to the hanging, King asked for a glass of water, stating "My throat is sore after talking so much to save my life".

== Portrayal on television ==
The actor Luke Halpin offers a sympathetic portrayal of Sandy King as the youngest member of the Curly Bill Brocius gang in the 1968 episode "A Mule ... Like the Army's Mule" of the syndicated television series Death Valley Days, hosted by Robert Taylor. Robert Yuro plays Curly Bill, and Sam Melville was cast as Army Lt. Jason Beal, who befriended King.
