= Sam Melville (actor) =

American actor (1936–1989)

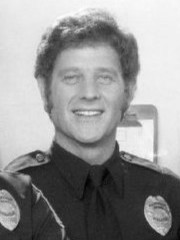
- Melville in 1973
- Born: August 20, 1936; Fillmore, Utah, U.S.
- Died: March 9, 1989 (aged 52); Los Angeles, California, U.S.
- Occupation: Actor
- Years active: 1966–1989

Samuel Gardner Melville (August 20, 1936 – March 9, 1989) was an American film and television actor. He appeared as a guest star on many television programs of the 1960s and 1970s.

== Career ==
He portrayed Officer Mike Danko in four seasons of Aaron Spelling's ABC series The Rookies, and The Bear in the 1978 surfing movie Big Wednesday, with Celia Kaye as his unnamed "bride".

Melville also had small parts in Hour of the Gun (1967) playing the role of Morgan Earp, The Thomas Crown Affair (1968) starring Steve McQueen, as Lieutenant James Crandall / Schmidt on Hogan's Heroes (1966), and the television disaster film Terror in the Sky (1971) as the co-pilot. On Gunsmoke and Hawaii Five-O, both on CBS, he played villains as a guest-star. However, on the episode "A Mule ... Like the Army's Mule" of the syndicated anthology series Death Valley Days, Melville portrayed United States Army Lt. Jason Beal, who befriended Sandy King, played by Luke Halpin, the youngest member of the Curly Bill Brocius outlaw gang. In 1967, he guest starred in an episode of the CBS western, Dundee and the Culhane.

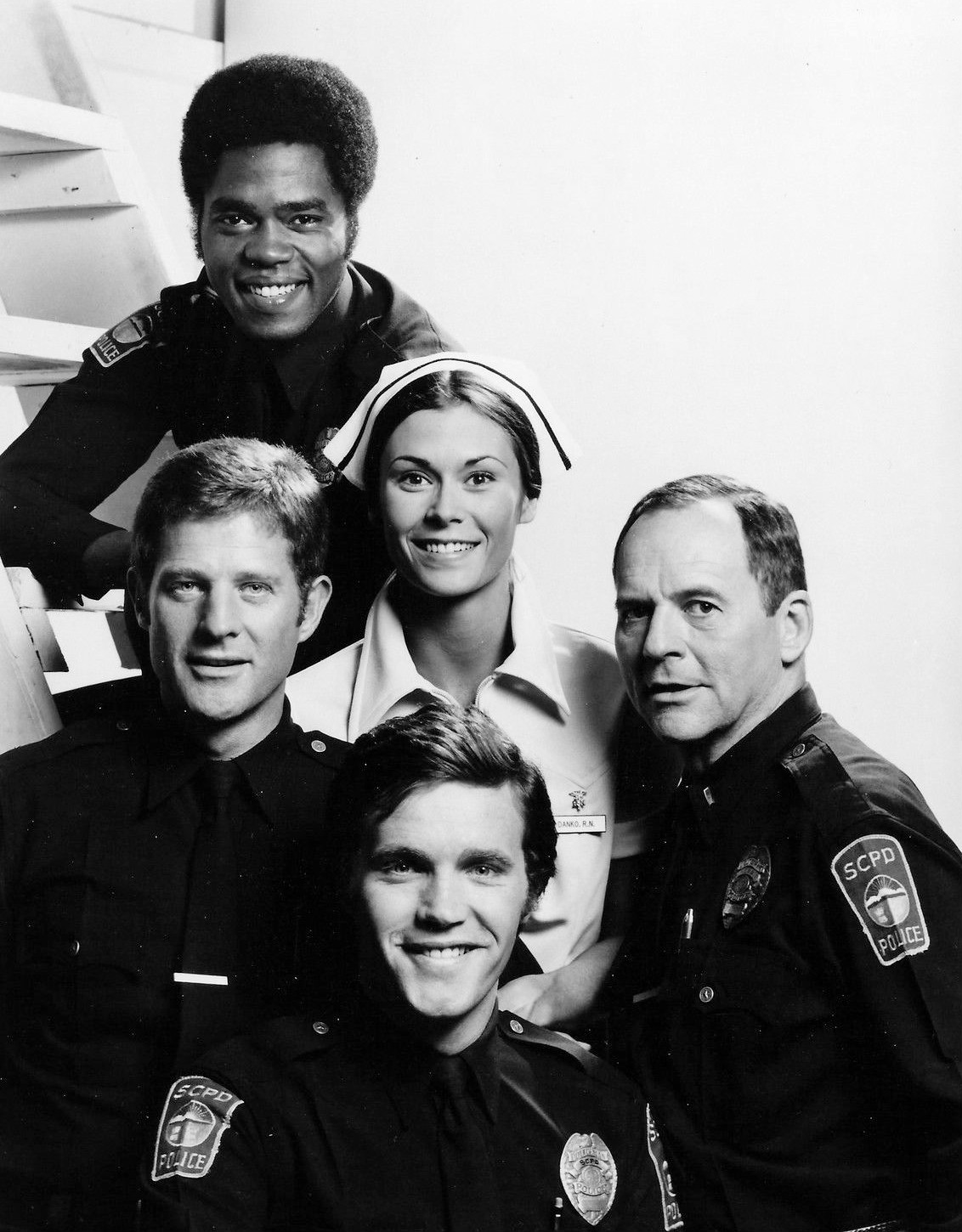
Cast photo of The Rookies. Clockwise from the top: Georg Stanford Brown (Terry Webster), Kate Jackson (Jill Danko), Gerald S. O'Loughlin (Eddie Ryker), Bruce Fairbairn (Chris Owens) and Sam Melville (Mike Danko) in 1975

In 1970, Melville was cast as Indian agent John Clum in the Death Valley Days episode, "Clum's Constabulary", hosted by Dale Robertson. In the story line, Clum recruits an elite team of Apaches to aid the U.S. Cavalry in the Southwest but faces opposition within the white community. Tris Coffin was cast as Captain Loren Phillips and John Considine as Lago.

Melville again portrayed a villain on the 1980s CBS drama Scarecrow and Mrs. King, which starred Kate Jackson as Mrs. King, and he later portrayed Mrs. King's ex-husband and father of her children on that series. He also played opposite Kate Jackson as her husband in the 1970s series The Rookies. He guest starred as a jewel thief, alongside Janie Fricke, in a seventh season episode of CBS's The Dukes of Hazzard titled "Happy Birthday, General Lee".

Melville was born in Fillmore, Utah, and died from heart failure in Los Angeles. He was survived by his wife, Annie.

== Filmography ==
Film
| Year | Title | Role | Notes |
|---|---|---|---|
| 1966 | A Smell of Honey, a Swallow of Brine | Lowell Carter | Credited as Neville Coward |
| 1967 | Hour of the Gun | Morgan Earp | |
| 1968 | The Thomas Crown Affair | Dave | |
| 1972 | Bigfoot: Man or Beast? | Himself | Documentary |
| 1976 | In Search of Bigfoot | Himself | Documentary |
| 1978 | Big Wednesday | Bear | |
| 1978 | Hooper | —N/a | Stuntman |
| 1988 | Twice Dead | Harry Cates | |
| 1989 | Fists of Steel | George Breenberg | |
| 1989 | Deadly Weapon | Sheriff Bartlett | |
| 1989 | Chain Letter | Tom | Unsold pilot, broadcast on ABC |
| 1990 | The Assassin | Senator Berkeley | Final film role Posthumous release |

Television
| Year | Title | Role | Notes |
|---|---|---|---|
| 1966 | That Girl | Roddy Waxman | Season 1 episode 6: "Rich Little Rich Kid" |
| 1966 | Shane | Len / Shane's Companion | 2 episodes |
| 1966 | T.H.E. Cat | Chris | Episode 11: "Curtains for Miss Winslow" |
| 1966 | Hogan's Heroes | Lieutenant James Crandall / Schmidt | Season 2 episode 15: "Information Please" |
| 1967 | The Fugitive | Deputy Lee Runnels | Season 4 episode 15: "Run the Man Down" |
| 1967 | The Big Valley | Jack | Season 2 episode 17: "Image of Yesterday" |
| 1967 | The Guns of Will Sonnett | Kirk | Season 1 episode 6: "Message at Noon" |
| 1967 | Iron Horse | Lloyd Barrington | Season 2 episode 7: "Leopards Try, But Leopards Can't" |
| 1967 | Dundee and the Culhane | Dave Howard | Season 1 episode 13: "The Catch-a-Thief" |
| 1967–1971 | Gunsmoke | Various characters | 10 episodes |
| 1968–1970 | Death Valley Days | John Clum / Lt. Jason Beal / David Meriweather | 3 episodes |
| 1968–1971 | Hawaii Five-O | Hawkins / Gary Oliver / Jerry Parks | 3 episodes |
| 1969 | Here Come the Brides | Lew | Season 1 episode 13: "The Log Jam" |
| 1970 | Bonanza | Coulter | Season 11 episode 20: "The Law and Billy Burgess" |
| 1970 | The Young Lawyers | Gabe Thomas | Episode 6: "We May Be Better Strangers" |
| 1970 | The Name of the Game | Gary Johnson | Season 3 episode 9: "All the Old Familiar Faces" |
| 1971 | Mannix | John Ogilvy | Season 5 episode 1: "Dark So Early, Dark So Long" |
| 1971 | Terror in the Sky | Stewart | TV movie (CBS) |
| 1971 | The Man and the City | Neal Carter | Episode 14: Jennifer |
| 1972 | Killer by Night | Book Store Owner | TV movie Uncredited |
| 1972–1976 | The Rookies | Officer Mike Danko | Main role – 93 episodes |
| 1974 | Fools, Females and Fun | Stephen Cole | TV movie |
| 1975 | Hollywood Squares | Himself | Panelist – September 22 |
| 1976 | The $10,000 Pyramid | Himself | 5 episodes |
| 1980 | Roughnecks | O'Dell Hartman | TV movie |
| 1980 | When the Whistle Blows | Charlie Sullivan | Episode 10: "Run for the Roses" |
| 1980 | Fantasy Island | Tony Chilton | Season 4 episode 2: "Flying Aces/The Mermaid Returns" |
| 1980–1984 | The Dukes of Hazzard | Russell "Snake" Harmon / Tommy Dunkirk / Rick | 3 episodes |
| 1982 | Strike Force | Dennis | Episode 10: "Internal Affairs" |
| 1982 | Code Red | Claude | Episode 13: "Burnout" |
| 1983–1986 | T.J. Hooker | Mitoski / Hank Carmichael | 2 episodes |
| 1984 | Airwolf | Mace Taggart | Season 2 episode 8: "HX-1" |
| 1984–1985 | The A-Team | Shaw / Rocco | 2 episodes |
| 1985–1987 | Scarecrow and Mrs. King | Joe King / Glen Tucker | 5 episodes |
| 1986 | Dallas | Dr. David Kenfield | 3 episodes |
| 1986 | The Colbys | Michael Grogan | Season 1 episode 14: "The Trial" |
| 1986 | Starman | Joe Floss | Episode 3: "Fatal Flaw" |
