= The Girl in My Life =

American daytime television program

- Created by: William T. Naud
- Directed by: Chris Darley; Tony Charmoli
- Presented by: Fred Holliday
- Announcer: John Harlan; Bob Warren
- Theme music composer: Edd Kalehoff
- Country of origin: United States

Production
- Executive producers: Bill Carruthers; William T. Naud; Steve Friedman
- Producers: Bob Henry, Brad Lachman; Bill Yagemann; Warren Williamson
- Running time: 30 minutes (per episode)
- Production companies: TN Productions; Metromedia Producers Corporation

Original release
- Network: ABC
- Release: July 9, 1973 – December 20, 1974

The Girl In My Life is an American daytime television show spotlighting women who made a difference in people's lives. The show was hosted by Fred Holliday and the announcers were Bob Warren and John Harlan. The program aired on ABC during 1973 and 1974. The show was created by William T. Naud. It replaced the original version of The Dating Game on ABC's weekday schedule, afternoons at 2:30 p.m. Eastern Time.

== Format ==
Each day on the show featured three to four vignettes of women. The people whose lives they touched would offer a testimonial statement about their special woman, always ending with the phrase "My name is _____, and the girl in my life is ____." The woman would come out on stage and be interviewed by Holliday, and then would receive a modest prize package or an item of special meaning to the woman.

The show's format was spoofed in an episode of The Carol Burnett Show, using the knockoff title "The Girl That We Like".

== Episode status ==
The series was not rerun after its original network run and is believed lost. One pilot program that used a different musical theme aired near the middle of the series' run.
