= Wild in the Sky =

1972 film

- Theatrical release poster
- Directed by: William T. Naud
- Written by: Dick Gautier; Peter Marshall; William T. Naud (story)
- Screenplay by: William T. Naud
- Produced by: Ralph Andrews; Dick Gautier; William T. Naud
- Starring: Georg Stanford Brown; Brandon deWilde; Keenan Wynn; Tim O'Connor; Dick Gautier
- Cinematography: Thomas E. Spalding
- Edited by: Michael Kahn; William T. Naud
- Music by: Jerry Styner
- Production company: Bald Eagle Productions
- Distributed by: American International Pictures
- Release dates: March 1972; December 1973 (New York)
- Running time: 87 minutes
- Country: United States
- Language: English

Wild in the Sky is a 1972 American action comedy film directed by William T. Naud and starring Georg Stanford Brown, Brandon deWilde (in his final film role), Keenan Wynn, Tim O'Connor, and Dick Gautier. The film was released as Black Jack in New York in December 1973. The film was released by American International Pictures in March 1972.

The film is a comedy set during the Vietnam War. Three boys are sentenced to prison for using cannabis, by a judge who views them as Hippies. The bus transporting them to prison falls down a canyon, and the surviving prisoners find themselves in an Air Force base with troops waiting for transport to Vietnam. The prisoners attempt to blend in with the troops, but unwittingly board a Boeing B-52 Stratofortress. They attempt to hijack the aircraft, causing most of the crew to parachute out. By the end of the film, the bomber wanders aimlessly over the United States.

== Plot ==
Three draft age boys are caught with marijuana during the Vietnam War era. The judge hates "Hippies" so sentences them to prison. The driver of the bus taking them to prison must go to the bathroom, so he stops at a remote and poorly maintained wayside to use its outhouse. The outhouse floor is rotted and the driver plunges through and is killed by the fall.

The driver hadn't set the parking brake on the prison bus, so the bus rolls down the highway and falls into and down a canyon with the three boys chained on board. They survive, and after some minor trouble free themselves from the wrecked bus. They then find their driver, dead. They realize that the bus fell into an Air Force base where troops are gathering for transport to the war overseas. They plot to steal uniforms, board a troop transport plane, and get off in the Philippines – figuring that since they are not on any passenger list they will make a clean get-away.

The three boys know nothing about air force planes and board a B 52 bomber instead of a troop passenger plane. The bomber crew quickly realize that the three new guys know nothing about working on a bomber crew. Having been found out, the three boys take over the bomber, planning to take the hijacked bomber to Cuba. When they find out that the B52 is carrying an atomic bomb, they realize that the United States will destroy the aircraft rather than let them escape to Cuba with a nuclear weapon, and give up that plan.

All the bomber crew except the pilot decide to escape and parachute out, abandoning the plane. The film ends with a view of the bomber flying aimlessly over the United States.

== Cast ==
- Georg Stanford Brown as Lynch
- Brandon deWilde as Josh
- Keenan Wynn as Gen. Harry Gobohare
- Tim O'Connor as Sen. Bob Recker
- Dick Gautier as Diver (as Richard Gautier)
- Robert Lansing as Major Reason
- James Daly as The President
- Michael Fox as President's Aide
- Larry Hovis as Capt. Breen
- Bernie Kopell as Penrat
- Karl Lucas as Sergeant
- Emby Mellay as Josh's Girlfriend
- Chet Stratton as Vice President Gabriel
- Dub Taylor as Officer Roddenberry
- Joe Turkel as Corazza
- Phil Vandervort as Woody
