= Vampire Hookers =

- Theatrical release poster
- Directed by: Cirio H. Santiago
- Written by: Howard R. Cohen
- Produced by: Robert E. Waters
- Starring: John Carradine; Bruce Fairbairn; Trey Wilson; Karen Stride; Lenka Novak; Katie Dolan
- Music by: Jaime Mendoza-Nava
- Production company: Cosa Nueva
- Distributed by: Caprican 3
- Release date: 1978
- Running time: 88 minutes
- Countries: Philippines; United States
- Language: English
- Box office

Vampire Hookers is a 1978 sexploitation horror film directed by Cirio H. Santiago and written by Howard R. Cohen. An international co-production of the Philippines and the United States, the film stars John Carradine as a vampire named Richmond Reed, who recruits three female vampires who pose as prostitutes in order to lure victims to their lair. The other members of the cast include Bruce Fairbairn, Trey Wilson, Karen Stride, Lenka Novak, and Katie Dolan.

Vampire Hookers is also known by a number of other titles, including Cemetery Girls, Night of the Bloodsuckers, Sensuous Vampires, and Twice Bitten. The film has received mixed reviews from critics.

== Cast ==
- John Carradine as Richmond Reed
- Bruce Fairbairn as Tom Buckley
- Trey Wilson as Terry Wayne
- Karen Stride as Cherish
- Lenka Novak as Suzy
- Katie Dolan as Marcy
- Lex Winter as CPO Taylor
- Leo Martinez as Julio
- Vic Diaz as Pavo

== Production ==
Vampire Hookers was filmed in Manila, Philippines.

== Critical reception ==
Paula Mejia of Newsweek included Vampire Hookers on a list of ten "excellent cheesy horror movies", and wrote that "the one-liners are atrocious, as is the movie's cringeworthy theme song". In his book Vampire Films of the 1970s: Dracula to Blacula and Every Fang Between, writer Gary A. Smith also noted the film's use of one-liners, writing that they "seem positively brilliant when compared with the fart humor which abounds." Smith wrote that the film "defines the term 'grindhouse cinema,'" and goes on to call it "poorly photographed in 16mm complete with the harsh lighting, post-synched dialogue and generally wretched performances so prevalent in '70s exploitation movies."

== Home media ==
In September 2013, Vampire Hookers was released on DVD by Vinegar Syndrome as a double feature with the 1978 film Death Force, which was also directed by Santiago. In August 2018, Vinegar Syndrome released the film on Blu-ray as part of their 5 Films 5 Years Volume #4 set, a release which also contains four other films. Squanch Games licensed the film to be used in their 2022 video game High On Life, in which the player can view the film in its entirety.
