= Rhyme and Reason (game show) =

- Created by: William T. Naud
- Presented by: Bob Eubanks
- Narrated by: Johnny Jacobs
- Country of origin: United States
- No. of episodes: 260

Production
- Running time: 22–24 minutes
- Production company: W. T. Naud Productions

Original release
- Network: ABC
- Release: July 7, 1975 – July 9, 1976

Rhyme and Reason is an American television game show that aired on ABC from July 7, 1975 through July 9, 1976. Bob Eubanks hosted the show, with Johnny Jacobs serving as announcer. William T. Naud created the series.

== Game play ==
The show consisted of two contestants and a panel of six celebrities.

The object of the game was to get the celebrity to say a word the contestant had written down. Before each round of play, the contestants were shown two sentences (e.g. "There once was a man/Who lived in a box"). Using an electronic pen, the contestants wrote down a word which rhymed with the last word in the second sentence (the home audience was shown the contestants' words, but the panelists were not). Once the words were written, contestants (alternating turns) called upon one celebrity to devise a second part of the poem, hoping the last word the celebrity used would match the contestant's; doing so earned that contestant two points. If the celebrity guessed the opponent's word, the opponent received one point. If the celebrity said neither word, his/her opponent chose another celebrity.

Play continued on a poem if necessary until all six celebrities had attempted to match; if all failed, Eubanks introduced a new poem. If both contestants used the same word, only the contestant who chose the celebrity who ultimately used the word scored two points. The first contestant to score three points won the game and $250. The first contestant to win two games played for $5,000.

=== Bonus round ===
The winning contestant and a celebrity partner of his or her choice played for $5,000. Two lines were again shown to the contestant, who then wrote three rhyming words. The contestant and celebrity then had thirty seconds to match all three words. The clock began once the lines were first read to the celebrity, who then provided a rhyme for the last word in the line. The process repeated for the entire thirty seconds or until the celebrity matched all three words. Matching on each word won the contestant $1,000, and matching all three awarded the $5,000 grand prize. Champions retired after playing five bonus rounds or reaching the $20,000 winnings limit.

== Broadcast history ==
Rhyme marked Eubanks' return to daytime television, six months after ABC cancelled The Newlywed Game. Regulars on the show were Nipsey Russell and (marital partners) Charlie Brill and Mitzi McCall. Some critics consider the series to have been expressly designed for Russell's talents as "comedy's poet laureate".

First placed on the schedule at 2:30 PM (1:30 Central), it was beaten by NBC's The Doctors. On December 29, the series moved to 1:30/12:30, which had been the home for Let's Make a Deal since 1963 (1968 on ABC). The move of Let's Make a Deal to 12:00/11:00 around the same time caused an audience loss that Rhyme and Reason, was unable to replace. Rhyme inherited the vastly-changed competition at that timeslot from Deal, which now featured 60-minute versions of Days of Our Lives and As the World Turns, two very popular serials. The old 2:30 timeslot was taken over by The Neighbors, and later Break the Bank, via a scheduling shuffle.

Days and ATWT overwhelmed Rhyme and the series ended its run two days after its first birthday. Its replacement would last nine times as long and would become television's most popular game within a year – Family Feud.

== Music ==
The show's theme and cues were provided by Score Productions. The main theme song was called "Hilltop" and composed by Charles Fox.

The pilot featured a hodgepodge of music, including an instrumental version of the Amboy Dukes hit Journey to the Center of Your Mind as its theme song and the opening notes to Perrey and Kingsley's The Savers (originally used on The Joker's Wild) as a reveal cue, as well as recycling the game win cue from Eubanks' previous series, The Newlywed Game.

== Episode status ==
Rhyme and Reason is believed to be destroyed as per network practices of the time. The pilot exists on video, and the finale–in which the celebrities began destroying the set as the show progressed, breaking props, tearing the carpet, and knocking down Bob Eubanks's podium–was discovered on audio tape in January 2011.
