= Trey Wilson =

American actor (1948–1989)

- Born: Donald Yearnsley Wilson III; January 21, 1948; Houston, Texas, U.S.
- Died: January 16, 1989 (aged 40); New York City, New York, U.S.
- Resting place: Forest Park Cemetery, Houston, Texas, U.S.
- Education: University of Houston
- Occupation: Actor
- Years active: 1976–1989
- Spouses: Cynthia June Brinson (m. 1969; div. 1974) Judy Blye Wilson (m. 1975)

Donald Yearnsley "Trey" Wilson III (January 21, 1948 – January 16, 1989) was an American character actor known for playing rural, authoritarian-type characters, most notably in comedies such as Raising Arizona and Bull Durham.

== Early life and education ==
Wilson was born Houston, Texas, in 1948, to Donald Yearnsley Wilson and Irene Louise Wilson. He attended Bellaire High School in Bellaire and then majored in English and theater at the University of Houston. He was a cousin of former Texas Republican State Senator Kim Brimer.

== Career ==
During his career, Wilson appeared in numerous stage productions and 30 films or television shows, including guest roles on Spenser: For Hire and The Equalizer. On stage, he co-starred in the ragtime-era musical Tintypes on Broadway, appeared in The Front Page at Lincoln Center and on Broadway, and appeared with Sandy Duncan in Peter Pan. He also appeared in Pat Benatar's music video "Love Is a Battlefield", as the father who throws her out of the house.

His most memorable roles in film were in Raising Arizona, as unpainted furniture store owner Nathan Arizona, and Bull Durham, as Joe Riggins, manager of the Durham Bulls minor league baseball team.

== Personal life ==
Wilson married Judy Blye, a well-known New York soap opera casting agent, on August 25, 1975. He was previously married to Cynthia June Brinson.

=== Death ===
Wilson died at the age of 40 from a cerebral hemorrhage in New York City on January 16, 1989, and was buried at Forest Park Cemetery in Houston five days later, on what would have been his 41st birthday.

Released after his death, Wilson's final film was Great Balls of Fire!, the biopic of Jerry Lee Lewis, where he played American record producer Sam Phillips. He had been cast in the Coen brothers' film Miller's Crossing at the time of his death, and was replaced by Albert Finney. The end credits of The Silence of the Lambs and Miss Firecracker dedicate the films to him.

== Filmography ==
=== Film ===
Trey Wilson film credits
Year	Title	Role	Notes	Ref(s)
1976	Drive-In	Gifford		
1977	Three Warriors	Chuck		
1978	Vampire Hookers	Terry Wayne		
1978	The Lord of the Rings	Additional voices		
1979	Three-Way Weekend	Howard Creep		
1984	Places in the Heart	Additional voices		
1984	A Soldier's Story	Colonel Nivens		
1985	The Protector	Truck Driver		
1985	Marie	FBI Agent		
1986	F/X	Lt. Murdoch		
1987	Raising Arizona	Nathan Arizona, Sr.		
1987	End of the Line	Sheriff Maxie Howell		
1987	The House on Carroll Street	Lieutenant Sloan		
1988	Bull Durham	Jim "Skip" Riggins		
1988	Married to the Mob	Regional Director Franklin		
1988	Twins	Beetroot McKinley		
1989	Miss Firecracker	Benjamin Drapper		
1989	Welcome Home	Colonel Barnes	Posthumous release	
1989	Great Balls of Fire!	Sam Phillips	Posthumous release	

=== Television ===
ACTOR television credits
Year	Title	Role	Notes
1985	Robert Kennedy and His Times	Jimmy Hoffa	3 episodes
1986–87	Spenser: For Hire	Jack Weller / Terry Vogel	2 episodes
1987	The Equalizer	Peter Marstand	Episode: "A Place to Stay"
1990	Law & Order	Defense Attorney Eddie Cosmatos	Episode: "Everybody's Favorite Bagman"
