= Harvey Whitehill =

American politician

Harvey H. Whitehill (September 2, 1838 – September 14, 1906) was a sheriff of the American Old West. He was best known for arresting Billy the Kid, who escaped from his jail in 1876.

His life as a lawman was documented in the book Sheriff Harvey Whitehill; Silver City Stalwart, by author Robert Alexander. Alexander also wrote extensively about Whitehill in Six-Guns and Single-Jacks: A History of Silver City and Southwestern New Mexico.

== Life on the frontier ==
Harvey Whitehill, a native of Ohio, ventured into New Mexico Territory about the time of the Apache Wars in the mid-1860s, and he took part in those. In 1874, Whitehill ran for and was elected sheriff of Grant County, New Mexico. The county seat, Silver City, was, at the time, an extremely wild town. Whitehill immediately set to policing it, and quickly gained the respect of its citizens. In early 1875, he befriended and hired gunman "Dangerous Dan" Tucker, a move with which many disagreed, due to Tucker having ridden with outlaw John Kinney, but which ultimately would prove to have been the right choice for that time. With Tucker, Whitehill set about to tame the small frontier town. During this period, both Tucker and he were involved in numerous shootouts with outlaws and trouble-making miners, in addition to conducting several legal hangings following court convictions. Tucker would later be a subject in the book Deadly Dozen, by Robert K. DeArment, describing Tucker as one of the twelve most underrated gunmen of the Old West.

In April and September 1875, Whitehill arrested Billy the Kid, then known as William Bonney, becoming the first lawman to do so. The first offense was for stealing cheese, and the second for stealing laundry. Whitehill would later state Bonney was an extremely likeable young man, and that his acts of theft were more due to necessity than him being a criminal, since his mother had recently died at the time. Also, Whitehill put to rest the legend that Bonney left Silver City due to having killed a man there, with Whitehill stating the killing was a rumor and never happened. He personally knew outlaw John Kinney, and evidently was well respected by both the citizens and the outlaw element. In 1882, a year after being credited with killing Billy the Kid, lawman Pat Garrett ran against Whitehill for the office of sheriff. It was ironic, in that Whitehill was the first lawman to arrest Bonney, whereas Garrett was the last. Garrett, who was not well liked in the area, was defeated by Whitehill in the election.

== The Gage train robbery and after ==
On November 24, 1883, a train robbery took place at a way station called Gage, near Silver City, with $830.60 being stolen. During the robbery, the train engineer, T.C. Webster, and the messenger, T.G. Hodgekins, were both shot and killed. Whitehill immediately set out for the robbers, leading a small posse. Whitehill first tracked down robber George Washington Cleavland, capturing him in Socorro, New Mexico. Whitehill convinced Cleavland his fellow robbers had all been captured, and that they had implicated him as the shooter of the engineer. Believing this, Cleavland denied he had killed the engineer, and made a full confession, detailing the robbery and his fellow robbers.

A short time later, Whitehill tracked down the other robbers, Mitch Lee, G.S. Collins, Frank Taggert, and Kit Joy. Less than two weeks later, while under guard by Deputy Dick Ware in the Silver City jail, Taggert and Lee overpowered Ware, while Joy took his guns. They then freed any other prisoners present, including Cleavland, took all guns from the jail, and fled. Whitehill again organized a posse, and went in pursuit. Receiving information from a citizen of the escapees' direction of travel, Whitehill set up to capture them at a pass near the Pinos Altos Mountains. The posse opened fire, killing Cleavland immediately. A Mexican prisoner, Carlos Chavez, who had escaped with them, was killed next, while the others dismounted and scampered for cover. Lee was mortally wounded a few minutes later, and Taggert, with no ammunition left, surrendered. Joy was able to make a break, shooting and killing posse member Joe Le Fur, while being wounded himself, hence escaping. Then, all of the escaped prisoners surrendered. Usually, those who had survived a shootout were to be taken back to the jail, but instead Whitehill and his posse hanged them on the spot. Only one prisoner, Charles Spencer, who though armed, proved by showing them his pistol and confirming he had not fired, was spared. Joy was later shot and wounded, a wound that caused the amputation of his left leg, by rancher Erichos "Rackety" Smith, near the Gila River. Tried and convicted in Hillsboro, New Mexico for the murder of Webster, he was sentenced to life in prison. He was never tried for the murder of Le Fur. Many years later, he was released, retiring to Bisbee, Arizona.

Whitehill would serve a total of six terms as sheriff of Grant County, marrying his wife Harriet, and fathering twelve children. His terms were not consecutive, as he left the office to serve one term in the Territorial Legislature in 1882. Although lesser known than many other lawmen of the Old West, Whitehill is credited by many historians as having been more effective in that role than many who would ultimately become better known, to include his former political rival, Pat Garrett. He died in Deming, New Mexico on September 14, 1906, and is buried in the Masonic cemetery, in Silver City.

Police appointments
Preceded by Charles McIntosh	Sheriff of Grant County, New Mexico; 1874–1882	Succeeded by James B. Woods
Preceded by A. B. Laird	Sheriff of Grant County, New Mexico; 1889–1890	Succeeded by James A. Lockhart
