= William Tattenbaum =

- Born: c. 1853
- Died: November 9, 1881 (aged 27–28); Shakespeare, New Mexico Territory
- Cause of death: Lynching
- Other name: Russian Bill
- Occupations: Cattle rustling, cowboy
- Known for: Cattle rustling; claims of Russian noble birth

William Tattenbaum, AKA Russian Bill (c. 1853 – November 9, 1881), was an outlaw of the Old West, and an outlaw Cowboy in Cochise County, Arizona. He is best known due to his claim of being of Russian Noble birth.

== Outlaw life ==
Russian Bill first came to Arizona Territory during the mid-1870s, and quickly gained a reputation for being an excellent dresser. He had curly blonde hair, was handsome, and kept an immaculate mustache, along with wearing expensive clothing. He claimed to be the son to Countess Telfrin, a wealthy aristocrat of nobility, and claimed to have served in the Russian Army as one of the czars Imperial White Hussars, but fled when facing a court martial after having punched a superior officer. None of his claims can be substantiated, so it is unknown what his true origins were.

After arriving in Arizona, Tattenbaum was quickly dubbed "Russian Bill" due to his claims, and he met and became friends with numerous cowboys and outlaws of the time, including Ike Clanton, "Curly Bill" Brocius, and Johnny Ringo. By all accounts, he was well liked by the Clanton clan, though it is doubtful that they fully believed his claims of nobility. He began taking part in cattle rustling in Arizona and New Mexico Territory some time around 1878. Although friends with the bunch, he was considered, by most accounts, to be more of an amusement to the others, who did not really take him seriously.

During this time, he became friends with outlaw and Cowboy Sandy King, well known for his numerous and regular brawls in saloons, and for his outlaw activities in association with the Cochise County Cowboys. The two became good friends, despite being complete opposites. When King left Tombstone in early 1881, around the time that the troubles started between the Cowboys and the Earps, Tattenbaum followed him. In early November, 1881, while in Shakespeare, New Mexico, King was arrested after shooting and wounding a storekeeper. Tattenbaum was not in town at the time, and instead was out rustling cattle.

On November 9, 1881, Tattenbaum was captured and brought to the Shakespeare jail. A vigilance committee had been formed locally to battle lawlessness found both men guilty of being a "general nuisance", along with the crimes for which they had been arrested, and lynched them together that same day. According to reports, Tattenbaum begged for his life to be spared. However, King merely asked for a glass of water and told them to carry on with it. The bodies of the two men were left hanging for days, as a reminder to any who visited the town that outlaw activity would not be tolerated. To date, there is nothing known to support the claims made by Tattenbaum of his being from noble Russian birth except for a story in the September 23, 1883, New York Times, The Story of Russian Bill – How the Shakespeare Citizens Got Rid of a Bad Gang.
