= Fred Grossinger =

American actor

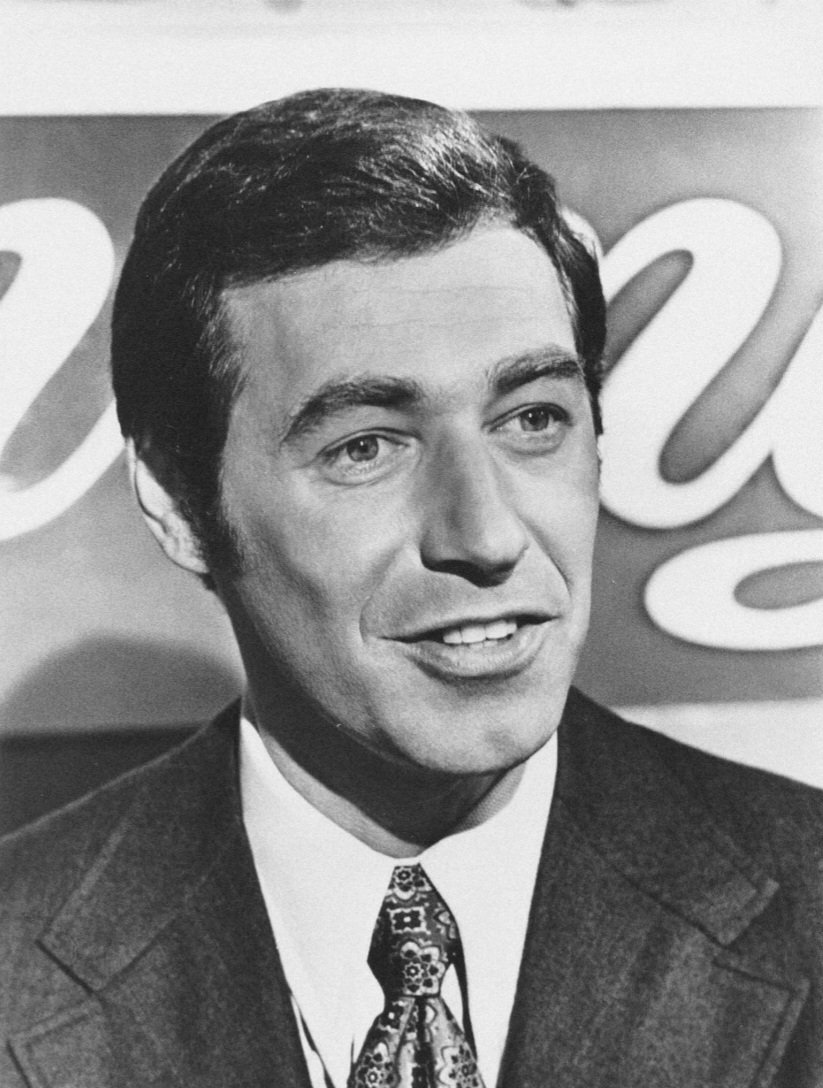
- Grossinger in The Girl in My Life, 1973
- Born: January 1, 1936; Scranton, Pennsylvania, U.S.
- Died: November 21, 1995 (aged 59); Los Angeles, California, U.S.
- Resting place: Mount Sinai Memorial Park Cemetery
- Other name: Fred Holliday
- Occupation: Actor
- Years active: 1958–1995
- Spouses: Judy Kapler; Nancy King
- Children: 1

Fred Grossinger (January 1, 1936 – November 21, 1995), better known as Fred Holliday, was an American stage, film, and television actor. He starred in more than one thousand television commercials from the late 1950s through the 1980s.

== Career ==
From the late 1950s to the mid 1990s, Holliday also made guest appearances on more than one hundred and fifty television shows, including Gunsmoke, Ben Casey, Gomer Pyle: USMC, Dragnet, That Girl, The Mod Squad, Nanny and the Professor, Dan August, Ironside, Lassie, Mission:Impossible, Adam-12, The F.B.I., McCloud, Columbo, Eight is Enough, Lou Grant, The Love Boat, Galactica 1980, The Facts of Life, Falcon Crest, Dynasty, Gimme a Break!, Riptide, Matlock, Knots Landing, Jake and the Fatman and Empty Nest. He was one of the Mighty Carson Art Players on NBC's The Tonight Show Starring Johnny Carson for twelve years, performed in the daytime dramas as Ron Wyche in Days of Our Lives, as the manager at the Capwell Hotel in Santa Barbara, in nighttime dramas such as John Atherton in Dallas and was host of a short-lived daytime show, The Girl in My Life, on ABC between 1973 and 1974.

His movie credits include A Patch of Blue (1965), Airport (1970), Colossus: The Forbin Project (1970), First Family (1980), Edge of the Axe (1988), and Lobster Man from Mars (1989). Holliday appeared in more than fifty Broadway and regional theater productions.

Professionally, Holliday served on the local board of directors of the Los Angeles chapter of AFTRA for ten years, as well as serving on the national board of AFTRA.

He was also active in the Screen Actors Guild.

Holliday was married to Judy Kapler. He had one daughter, Debra Jeanne (Grossinger) Rouse, from his first marriage to Nancy King.

== Death ==
Holliday died in Los Angeles on November 21, 1995, at the age of 59. The cause of death was a heart attack.

== Filmography ==
Year	Title	Role	Notes
1958	Wind Across the Everglades	Slow Boy	Uncredited
1963	The Prize	Swedish Officer (Nudist Meeting)	Uncredited
1964	The New Interns	Intern	Uncredited
1965	A Patch of Blue	Man	Uncredited
1967	A Guide for the Married Man	Party Guest #6	
1970	Airport	Chester Jennings - Passenger	Uncredited
1970	Colossus: The Forbin Project	Military Computer Entry - Missile Launch	Uncredited
1972	Lapin 360		
1980	First Family	U. N. Official #1	
1988	Edge of the Axe	Frank McIntosh	
1989	Lobster Man from Mars	Colonel Ankrum	
