= Georg Stanford Brown =

Cuban actor (born 1943)

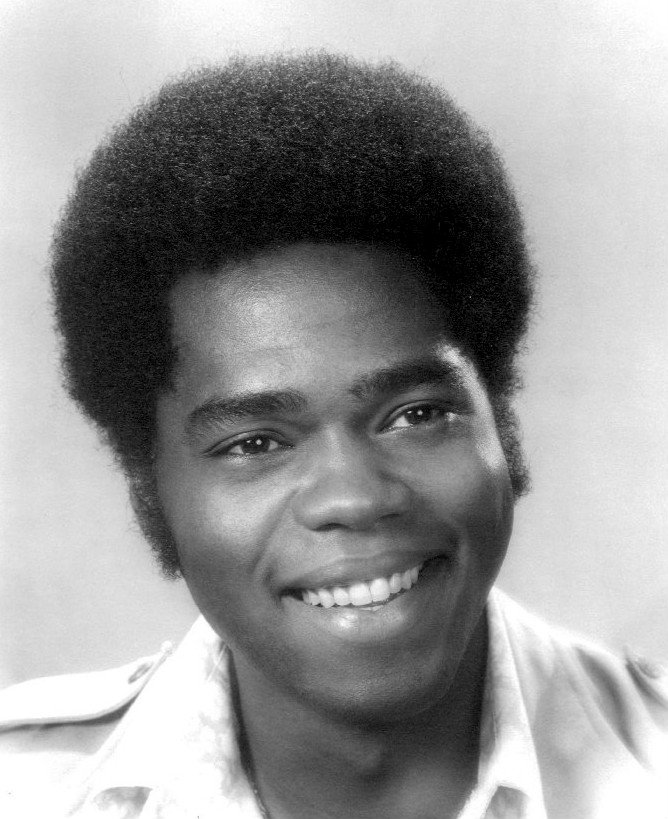
- Brown in 1972
- Born: June 24, 1943 (age 83); Havana, Cuba
- Education: Los Angeles City College; American Musical and Dramatic Academy
- Occupations: Actor; director
- Years active: 1966–2015
- Spouse: Tyne Daly (m. 1966; div. 1990)
- Children: 3
- Awards: Best Director – Drama Series; 1986 Cagney & Lacey

Georg Stanford Brown (born June 24, 1943) is a Cuban actor, perhaps best known as one of the stars of the ABC police television series The Rookies from 1972 to 1976. On the show, Brown played the character of Officer Terry Webster.

== Early life and education ==
Brown was born in Havana, Cuba, the son of Jamaican immigrants. He was seven years old when his family moved to Harlem, New York City. At age 15, he formed the singing group The Parthenons, which had a single TV appearance shortly before breaking up. Brown quit high school, after being invited to do so by a few frustrated teachers. He left New York to move to Los Angeles at 17.

After a few years of not being sure what he wanted to do, he decided to go back to school. He passed the college entrance exam and was admitted to Los Angeles City College where he majored in Theater Arts to "take something easy". He ended up really enjoying it and returned to New York to attend the American Musical and Dramatic Academy. He worked as a school janitor to pay his tuition.

== Early career ==
Brown says he feels acting is just something he "fell into". Six months out of school, he appeared in Joseph Papp's New York Shakespeare Festival (now called Shakespeare in the Park), and next in The Comedians with Richard Burton and Elizabeth Taylor. His work then took him to Africa for four and a half months, Paris, then to Southern France and a chance meeting with Alex Haley who was on his way to Africa to work on a story he was writing, which later was revealed to be Roots.

== Career ==
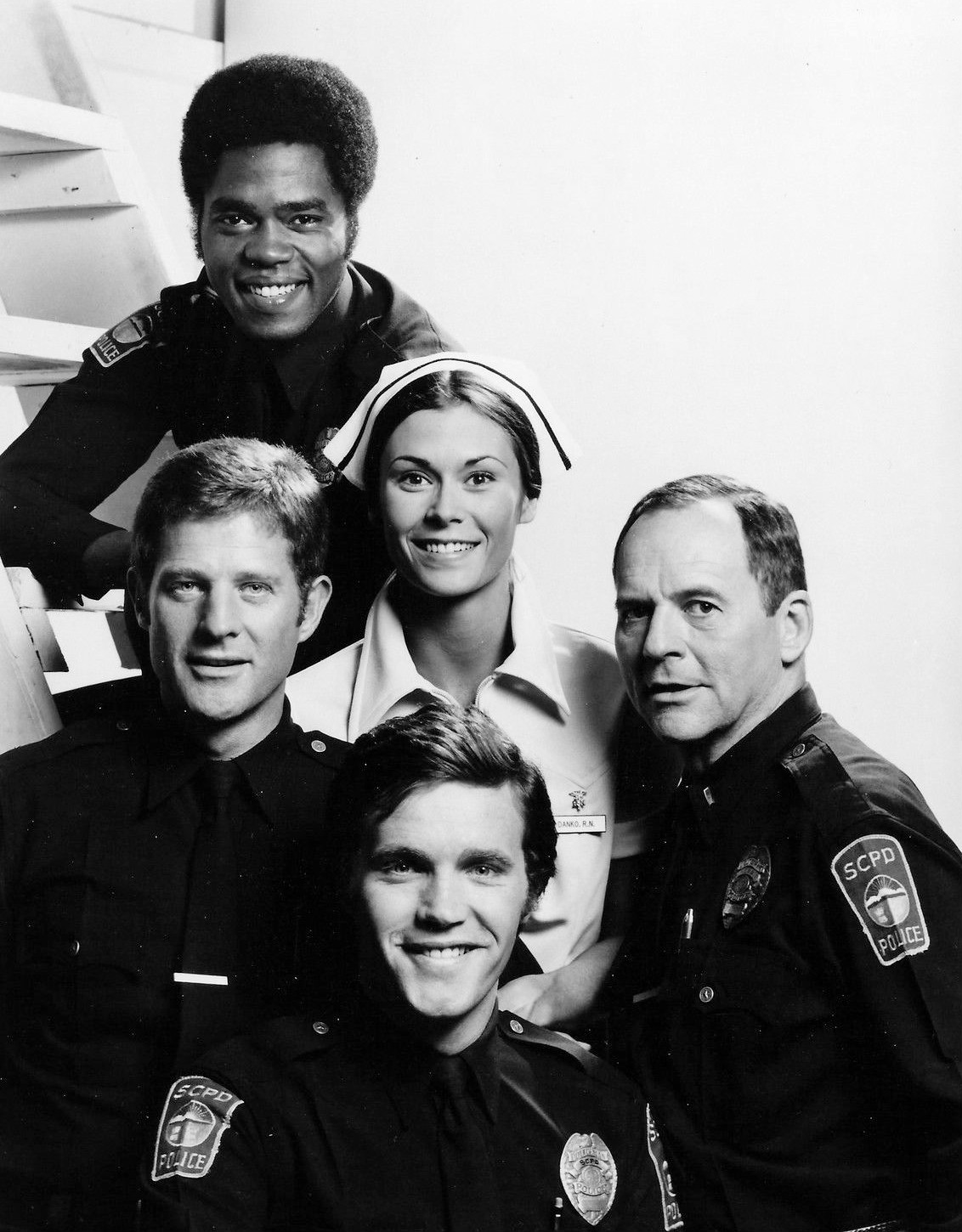
Cast photo of The Rookies. Clockwise from the top: Georg Stanford Brown (Terry Webster), Kate Jackson (Jill Danko), Gerald S. O'Loughlin (Eddie Ryker), Bruce Fairbairn (Chris Owens) and Sam Melville (Mike Danko) in 1975

During the 1960s, Brown had a variety of roles in films, including Henri Philipot in The Comedians (1967), Theon Gibson in Dayton's Devils (1968), and Dr. Willard in Bullitt (1968). His 1970s films included Colossus: The Forbin Project (1970), The Man (1972), and Wild in the Sky (1972), co-starring Brandon deWilde, as anti-war, anti-establishment guerrillas, who devise a scheme to destroy Fort Knox with an atomic bomb.

Brown later played Tom Harvey (son of Chicken George, great-grandson of Kunta Kinte, and great-grandfather of Alex Haley) in the 1977 television miniseries Roots, and 1979's Roots: The Next Generations. In 1980, he starred in the TV movie The Night the City Screamed, and in Stir Crazy opposite Gene Wilder and Richard Pryor. Later in 1984 he starred in the TV movie The Jesse Owens Story in the role of Lew Gilbert. He then went on to a supporting role in yet another miniseries North & South in 1985 as the character Garrison Grady.

When Brown was still on The Rookies, producer Aaron Spelling suggested he try directing. Brown directed four episodes of The Rookies and when the show was canceled, Spelling hired him to direct eight episodes for other series he was producing. In 1986, he won a Primetime Emmy Award for Outstanding Directing for a Drama Series for directing the final episode ("Parting Shots") in season 5 of Cagney & Lacey. His directing career continued with the television film Alone in the Neon Jungle (also known by its earlier name Command in Hell), which was network premiered by CBS on Sunday January 17, 1988. It was characterized in The Washington Post by Tom Shales as 'a stupefyingly preposterous bungle, but only in its better moments', while a marginally more favorable assessment praised 'cop characters that are humanized with humor and the realistically gritty feel that comes with filming on location in Pittsburgh instead of Hollywood'.

Brown co-starred in the comedy sequel House Party 2 in 1991, and the Showtime television show Linc's from 1998 thru 2000. Brown also directed several second-season episodes of the television series Hill Street Blues.

== Personal life ==
Brown met his ex-wife, actress Tyne Daly, while at AMDA, where they both studied under Philip Burton, Richard Burton's mentor. They were married from 1966 to 1990. They have three daughters.

== Filmography ==
=== Film ===
Year	Title	Role	Notes
1966	How to Steal a Million	Waiter	uncredited
1967	The Comedians	Henri Philipot	
1968	Dayton's Devils	Theon Gibson	
1968	Bullitt	Dr. Willard	
1970	Colossus: The Forbin Project	Dr. John F. Fisher	
1972	Wild in the Sky	Lynch	
1972	The Man	Robert Wheeler	
1980	Stir Crazy	Rory Schultebrand	
1983	Imps*	Charlie	segment "Unhappy Hour"
1991	House Party 2	Professor Sinclair	
1994	Ava's Magical Adventure	Clayton 'Clay'	
2003	Cuban Blood	Black Bum	
2005	Shackles	Warden	Direct-to-Video
2015	Madea's Tough Love	Mystery Man (voice role)	uncredited

=== Television ===
Year	Title	Role	Notes
1967	Dragnet 1967	Billy Jones	Episode: "The Big Problem"
1968	Judd, for the Defense	Harry Crews	Episode: "The Ends of Justice"
1968	It Takes a Thief	Bates	Episode: "Hans Across the Border"
1968	The F.B.I.	George Kern	Episode: "The Intermediary"
1969	The Young Lawyers	Ted Robinson	Episode: "The Young Lawyers"
1969	Julia	Adam Spencer	Episode: "The Eve of Adam"
1969–1970	The Bold Ones: The Lawyers	Kenneth Miller / Richie Morris	2 episodes
1969–1971	Mannix	Sam Thomas / Brad Turner	2 episodes
1970	Here Comes the Brides	Obie Brown	Episode: "A Bride for Obie Brown"
1970	Ritual of Evil	Larry Richmond	Television Movie
1970	The Bold Ones: The New Doctors	Bakumba	Episode: "Killer on the Loose"
1970	The Name of the Game	Kajid	Episode: "The Time Is Now"
1970	The Interns	Hamid	Episode: "Dancy"
1970–1972	Medical Center	Dr. Roy James	3 episodes
1972	Room 222	Jerry	Episode: "And in This Corner..."
1972	Mission: Impossible	Luke Jenkins	Episode: "Bag Woman"
1972	Norman Corwin Presents	unknown role	Episode: "A Son, Come Home"
1972–1976	The Rookies	Officer Terry Webster	series regular (93 episodes)
1976	Dawn: Portrait of a Teenage Runaway	Donald Umber	Television Movie
1977	Roots	Tom Harvey	Miniseries (2 episodes)
1979	Roots: The Next Generations		Miniseries (2 episodes)
1979	Paris	Donald Holmes	Episode: "Dead Men Don't Kill"
1980	The Night the City Screamed	Charles Neville	Television Movie
1982	Police Squad!	Police under the Safe	Episode: "Ring of Fear (A Dangerous Assignment)"
1982	The Kid with the Broken Halo	Rudy Desautel	Television Movie
1983	In Defense of Kids	Ben Humphries	Television Movie
1984	Cagney & Lacey	ADA Burke	Episode: "Choices"
1984	The Jesse Owens Story	Lew Gilbert	Television Movie
1985	North and South, Book I	Garrison Grady	Miniseries (4 episodes)
1987–1989	Matlock	Judge Stuart Franklin / Maj. Jeffrey Hamilton	4 episodes
1988	Alone in the Neon Jungle	Sgt. Clevon Jackson	Television Movie
1990	Jake and the Fatman	Lee Preston	Episode: "Who's Sorry Now?"
1992	Murder Without Motive: The Edmund Perry Story	Darwin Tolliver	Television Movie
1995	Martin	Reverend Watson	Episode: "Love is a Beach"
1997	The Legend of Calamity Jane	Additional Voices (voice role)	English version; 13 episodes
1997	Malcolm & Eddie	Mr. Bellamy	Episode: "Roofless People"
1998	Team Knight Rider	General William Simonson	Episode: "The Return of Megaman"
1998	The Wild Thornberrys	Kito (voice role)	Episode: "Temple of Eliza"
1998–2000	Linc's	Johnnie B. Goode	series regular (25 episodes)
2000	Family Law	Reverend Perry	Episode: "Media Relations"
2000	Freedom	Walter Young	Episode: "Alpha Dogs"
2001	The District	Preston Kembridge	Episode: "Cop Hunt"
2002	Strong Medicine	Admiral Thomas Carter	Episode: "House Calls"
2003	The Lyon's Den	Judge Ed Rossi	Episode: "The Fifth"
2004	Nip/Tuck	James Sutherland	4 episodes
2005	Judging Amy	Detective Sanders	Episode: "Dream a Little Dream"
2005	Mystery Woman	Toby (uncredited)	Episode 5: Mystery Woman: Vision of a Murder
2005	The Reading Room	Rahim	Television Movie
2012	Electric City	Commander Welles (voice role)	2 episodes

=== Video games ===
Year	Title	Role	Notes
2004	Men of Valor	Roland Shephard	voice role

=== Television ===
Year	Title	Notes
1975–1976	The Rookies	4 episodes
1977	Starsky and Hutch	3 episodes
1977–1979	Charlie's Angels	8 episodes
1978	The Fitzpatricks	Episode: "The New Fitzpatrick"
1978	Family	Episode: "Fear of Shadows"
1978	Lucan	Episode: "Nightmare"
1978	Fantasy Island	Episode: "Carnival/The Vaudevillians"
1979	Roots: The Next Generations	Episode: "Part V (1932-1933)"
1979–1980	Paris	2 episodes
1980	Tenspeed and Brown Shoe	Episode: "The Millionaire's Life"
1981	Lou Grant	Episode: "Violence"
1981	Palmerstown, U.S.A.	Episode: "Dry Hole"
1981	Grambling's White Tiger	Television Movie
1981	The Greatest American Hero	Episode: "The Two-Hundred-Mile-an-Hour Fast Ball"
1981–1986	Hill Street Blues	7 episodes
1982	Police Squad!	Episode: "The Butler Did It (A Bird in the Hand)"
1982–1986	Cagney & Lacey	5 episodes
1983	Fame	Episode: "...Help from My Friends"
1983	Trauma Center	Episode: "Notes About Courage"
1983	The Mississippi	Episode: "The Shooting"
1984	Hardcastle and McCormick	Episode: "Third Down and Twenty Years to Life"
1984	The Fall Guy	Episode: "Olympic Quest"
1984	Call to Glory	Episode: "Call It Courage"
1984	Magnum P.I.	2 episodes
1984–1985	Miami Vice	2 episodes
1984–1986	Dynasty	4 episodes
1985	Finder of Lost Loves	Episode: "Deadly Silence"
1985	Hotel	Episode: "Illusions"
1985	The Paper Chase	Episode: "The Source"
1987	Miracle of the Heart: A Boys Town Story	Television Movie
1986	Tough Cookies	Episode: "The Stoolie"
1987	Vietnam War Story	Episode: "The Mine"
1987	Kids Like These	Television Movie
1988	Alone in the Neon Jungle	Television Movie
1989	Stuck with Each Other	Television Movie
1992	The Last P.O.W.? The Bobby Garwood Story	Television Movie
1993	Father & Son: Dangerous Relations	Television Movie
1996	Viper	Episode: "On a Role"
1999	Linc's	Episode: "From Here to Eternity"
2000	The Brothers Garcia	Episode: "Love Me Tender"
2004	The Long Shot	Television Movie
2004	Wedding Daze	Television Movie
2004	Angel in the Family	Television Movie
2005	Mystery Woman	Episode 3: Mystery Woman: Snapshot
2005	The Reading Room	Television Movie

=== Television ===
Year	Title	Role	Notes
1987	Kids Like These	Executive Producer	Television Movie
1987	Vietnam War Story	Executive Producer	3 episodes
1989	Stuck with Each Other	Executive Producer	Television Movie
2004	The Long Shot	Co-Executive Producer	Television Movie

== Accolades ==
Association	Year	Category	Nominated work	Results	Ref
Directors Guild of America Awards	1982	Outstanding Directorial Achievement in Dramatic Series	Hill Street Blues	Nominated	
Primetime Emmy Awards	1981	Outstanding Directing in a Drama Series (for Episode: "Up In Arms")	Hill Street Blues	Nominated	
Primetime Emmy Awards	1985	Outstanding Directing in a Drama Series (for Episode: "El Capitan")	Hill Street Blues	Nominated	
Primetime Emmy Awards	1986	Outstanding Directing in a Drama Series (for Episode: "Parting Shots")	Cagney & Lacey	Won	
