= Sweepstakes (TV series) =

1979 American television series

- Also known as: $weepstake$
- Genre: Anthology
- Starring: Edd Byrnes
- No. of seasons: 1
- No. of episodes: 9

Production
- Producer: Robert Dozier
- Running time: 90 minutes (pilot); 60 minutes (all other episodes)
- Production companies: Miller-Milkis Productions, Paramount Television

Original release
- Network: NBC
- Release: January 26 – March 30, 1979

Sweepstakes, stylized as $weepstake$, is an American anthology television series that aired in the United States on NBC from January 26 to March 30, 1979. It depicts the lives of people who hope to win a large amount of money in a sweepstakes and what happens after they win — or do not win — the money.

== Synopsis ==
$weepstake$ is an anthology series that depicts the lives of people who buy tickets for a state-owned lottery hosted by a master of ceremonies, "the $weepstake$ M.C." Each episode depicts a week in which 12 people became finalists in that week's lottery, and the first half of the episode introduces the three finalists who are destined to win either the $1 million jackpot or one of the two $1,000 consolation prizes, the issues in their lives, and their plans to use the $1 million jackpot if they win it. At the midpoint of each episode, the $weepstake$ M.C. hosts the lottery drawing and announces the winner of the jackpot and that the other two finalists the episode focuses on have won the consolation prizes. The second half of the episode then tells the story of the effect of the lottery on the three winners — how the jackpot winner spends his or her money and how the two consolation prize winners fare after their loss.

The only regular in the series is the $weepstake$ M.C.; each episode otherwise has a cast consisting entirely of guest stars and has storylines unrelated to those of other episodes. Some of the stories told in $weepstake$ are comedic in nature and others are dramatic. The most deserving finalist does not always win the jackpot.

== Cast ==
- Edd Byrnes as The $weepstake$ M.C.

== Production notes ==
$weepstake$ represented an update of the 1950s CBS anthology series The Millionaire, in each episode of which an anonymous benefactor gave someone $1 million and the story of the effect of sudden wealth on their lives followed. $weepstake$ differed from The Millionaire in that rather than depicting merely the impact of wealth on someone's life, episodes were constructed to allow viewers to pick their favorite finalist during the first half, see whether or not that finalist won the jackpot, and then see the result of either winning or losing on their lives.

Miller-Milkis Productions produced $weepstake$ in association with Paramount Television. Robert Dozier served as executive producer.

== Critical reception ==
An article published in the January 26, 1979, edition of The Record of Hackensack, New Jersey, described $weepstake$ as an "unsophisticated anthology series" and added that on Friday evenings NBC's "string of intelligent shows is broken at 10 to 11," which was the time slot in which the network broadcast $weepstake$.

== Broadcast history ==
$weepstake$ premiered on NBC on January 26, 1979. NBC scheduled it as part of a slate of midseason replacement shows that debuted that evening to follow the successful Diff'rent Strokes: In order, NBC's new Friday line-up consisted of Diff′rent Strokes, Brothers and Sisters, Turnabout, Hello, Larry, and $weepstake$. Other than Diff′rent Strokes, the new line-up failed with audiences; out of 63 programs broadcast that week, Brothers and Sisters ranked 51st, Turnabout 50th, Hello, Larry 52nd, and $weepstake$ 59th. $weepstake$ continued to struggle in the ratings and was cancelled after just over two months on the air. Its ninth and final episode was broadcast on March 30, 1979. It aired at 10:00 PM Eastern Time on Friday throughout its run.

== Episodes ==
No.	Title	Original release date
1	"Lynn and Grover and Joey"	January 26, 1979
The three finalists are a wife who is separated from her husband, who is dating another woman; an ex-convict out on probation who needs to find a legitimate job; and a dog named Grover whose owner's relatives demand a share of the dog's winnings. Guest stars: Katherine Helmond, Abe Vigoda, Adam Arkin, Bill Daily, Elaine Joyce and Kim Richards.
2	"Dewey and Harold and Sarah and Maggie"	February 2, 1979
The three finalists are an off-beat artist who wants to buy his condemned apartment building before it can be demolished because he is in danger of losing his paintings, which are painted on the walls of the building; a blind girl who needs expensive eye surgery; and a lonely young woman who is looking for her long-lost father. Guest stars: Frankie Avalon, Joan Blondell, Bill Dana, Kathryn Holcomb, Dinah Manoff, Diana Muldaur, Richard Mulligan, Lloyd Nolan, Ron Palillo and Tom Poston.
3	"Vince, Pete and Patsy, Jessica and Rodney"	February 9, 1979
Three couples — two circus performers wanting to become parents, an unhappy couple bored with their marriage and about to get a divorce, and a pickpocket and his victim — are the week's finalists. Guest stars: Mark Shera, Arlene Golonka, James Coco, Howard Duff, Joan Hackett, Patrick Macnee, Rue McClanahan and Alan Hale, Jr.
4	"Billy, Wally and Ludmilla, and Theodore"	February 16, 1979
The three finalists are a has-been tennis pro who sees a potential fortune in a wealthy and attractive female player, a country boy dissatisfied with his life who aspires to be a mechanic and is trying to prove his skill through United States Army service, and a philanthropist who has gone broke and has nothing left but his butler after giving too much of his money to the poor and whose wealthy uncle has disowned him for doing it. Guest stars: David Ogden Stiers, Penny Peyser, Jon Walmsley, Roddy McDowall, Robert Coote, Jack Elam and Vic Tayback.
5	TBA	February 23, 1979
The pilot for the series, and its only 90-minute episode. The three finalists are a destitute bookie who is desperate to find money to pay his debts to other criminals and finds his sweepstakes ticket when he recovers an elderly woman's purse from a thief; Bonnie Jones, a young unemployed cocktail waitress who is romantically pursued by Norman Townes, a trustee of her inheritance who buys a lottery ticket with a dollar from her trust in the hope of saving her dream home from foreclosure; and a young lawyer asked to run for public office who needs campaign funds and whose campaign manager gives him a lottery ticket to prove he is a winner. The bookie wins only a consolation prize and is last seen fleeing the theater with two criminals in pursuit; the stories of the other two finalists have happier endings. Guest stars: Herschel Bernardi, Adrienne Barbeau, Bernie Kopell and Frederic Forrest.
6	"Roscoe, Elizabeth, and the M.C."	March 2, 1979
The three finalists are Roscoe Fuller, a carpet salesman and school bus driver who wants to go into business for himself; 12-year-old Elizabeth, who wants to use the money to help her father get his fast-food franchise rolling and make her parents' dreams come true; and Beverly, the girlfriend of the $weepstake$ M.C., whose winnings could help the M.C. get his screenplay filmed and fulfill his aspirations of becoming an actor. Guest stars: Gary Burghoff, Ron Carey, Jack Carter, Nancy Dussault, Phil Foster, Tania Johnson, Meadowlark Lemon, Roxie Roker, Nipsey Russell and Susan Strasberg.
7	TBA	March 9, 1979
The three finalists are a homeless, unappreciated 80 year-old woman forced to live with her son's family, a prison inmate who regularly breaks out of jail, and a movie stuntman. Guest stars: Hermione Baddeley, Henry Gibson and Dick Gautier.
8	TBA	March 23, 1979
The three finalists are an estranged wife who wants to quit working as a flight attendant and stay home with her child to overcome the pressures her family puts on her; a delicatessen owner struggling to stay in business who needs money to cover up his purchase of a sailboat; and a businesswoman who loves her employer more than her career and is competing with a businessman for the top spot in a company despite her romantic involvement with him. Guest stars: Char Fontane, Jack Jones, Kenneth Mars, Fred Willard, Tom Hallick, Al Molinaro and Caroline McWilliams.
9	"Cowboy, Linda and Angie, Mark"	March 30, 1979
The three finalists are a baseball or basketball (according to various sources) player who has been fired because of his practical jokes and plans to regain his former glory by using his winnings to start his own team; a parking attendant who needs the money to repay a loan he used to try to impress a beautiful rich woman he has a crush on; and two women who are good friends who share a sweepstakes ticket but have a falling out about how to spend the money if they win. Guest stars: Vincent Van Patten, Ben Murphy and Jennifer Salt. (Note: Ben Murphy would later co-star on a similar 1983 series for ABC, Lottery!)
