= Mark Shera =

American actor (born 1949)

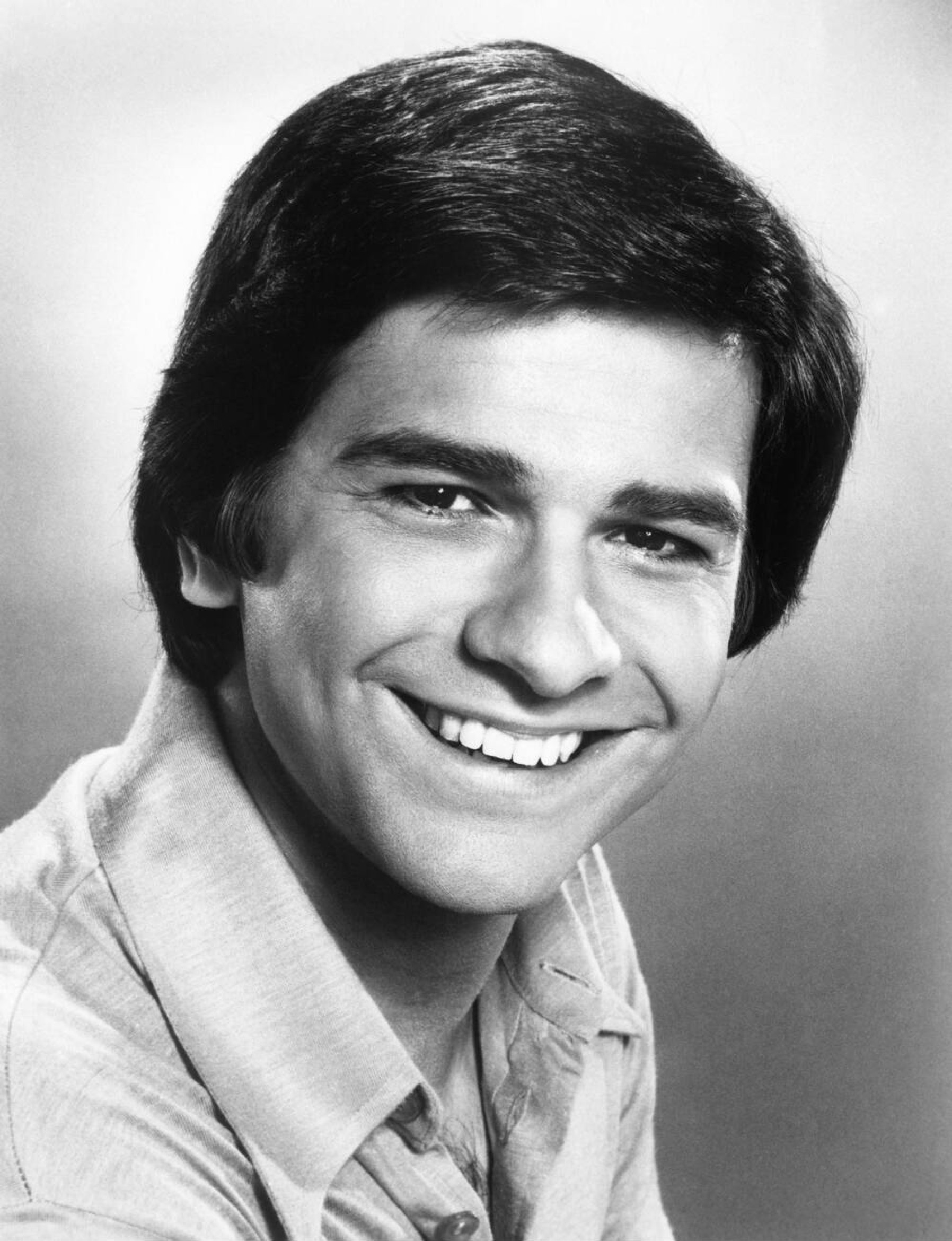
- Shera in Barnaby Jones (1976)
- Born: Mark Shapiro; July 10, 1949 (age 77); Bayonne, New Jersey, U.S.
- Occupation: Actor
- Years active: 1970-2002

Mark Shera (born Mark Shapiro on July 10, 1949) is an American film and television actor.

Shera was cast from 1975 to 1976 in the television series S.W.A.T. in the role of Officer Dominic Luca. He also played J.R. in the television series Barnaby Jones from 1976-1980.

== Filmography ==
=== Movies ===
Year	Title	Role	Notes
1990	Ladies on Sweet Street	Patrick	
1996	Black Mask	Voice	

=== Television ===
Year	Title	Role	Notes
1970	Love, American Style		1 Episode: Love and the Housekeeper
1974	Nicky's World	Nicky Kaminis	TV movie
1974	Kojak	Patrolman Ralph Warren	1 Episode: The Best War in Town
1975	Gunsmoke	Joachim Etchahoun	1 Episode: Manolo
1975-76	S.W.A.T.	Officer Dominic Luca	37 episodes
1976-80	Barnaby Jones	Jedediah Romano "J.R." Jones	93 episodes
1978-1979	The Love Boat	Jeff Cross / Bruce Morrison	2 episodes: Ages of Man/Bo 'n Sam/Families, A Selfless Love/The Nubile Nurse/Parents Know Best
1979	$weepstake$	Vince	1 Episode: Vince, Pete and Patsy, Jessica and Rodney
1981	Aloha Paradise	Matt Shaw	1 Episode: Best of Friends/Success/Nine Karats
1983	Matt Houston	Marquis Duval Jr.	1 Episode: The Hunted
1983	Adams House	Michael Purcell	TV movie
1984	Fantasy Island	Mark Hodges	1 Episode: Lady of the House/Mrs. Brandell's Favorites
1984	His Mistress	Jeff Perkins	TV movie
1985-1988	Murder, She Wrote	Raymond Carmody / Van Buran / Thor Danziger	4 episodes: Capitol Offense, Death Stalks the Big Top: Part 1 & 2, Murder Through the Looking Glass
1986	Blacke's Magic	Lt. Ted Byrnes	2 episodes: Breathing Room (Pilot), Death Goes to the Movies
1986	Crazy Like a Fox	Ted Bennett / Swanson	1 Episode: The Fox Who Saw Too Much
1987	Right to Die	Roger	TV movie
1991	Dragnet	Rabbi Fred Dworkin	1 Episode: The Vandals
1993	Almost Home	Paul	1 Episode: You Ought to Be in Pictures
1995	Beverly Hills, 90210	Professor Hayward	1 Episode: Violated
2002	Taken	Bruce from Nebraska, Radio Caller	1 Episode: Taken
