= Barnaby Jones =

American detective television series (1973–1980)

- Genre: Detective fiction
- Developed by: Edward Hume
- Starring: Buddy Ebsen; Lee Meriwether; Mark Shera (1976–80)
- Theme music composer: Jerry Goldsmith
- Composers: Jerry Goldsmith; Jeff Alexander; Duane Tatro; John Elizalde; Ralph Kessler; Richard Markowitz; Nelson Riddle; Mauro Bruno; Robert Drasnin; John Carl Parker; Don Bagley; Hugo Friedhofer; Willard Jones; Lance Rubin; Bruce Broughton; Frank Denson
- Country of origin: United States
- Original language: English
- No. of seasons: 8
- No. of episodes: 178 (list of episodes)

Production
- Executive producers: Quinn Martin (1973–78); Philip Saltzman (1978–80)
- Running time: 60 minutes
- Production companies: Woodruff Productions; (1978-1980); (seasons 7-8); QM Productions

Original release
- Network: CBS
- Release: January 28, 1973 – April 3, 1980

Related
- Cannon

Barnaby Jones is an American detective series created by Quinn Martin for QM Productions that aired on CBS from January 28, 1973, to April 3, 1980. It stars Buddy Ebsen as Barnaby Jones, a private investigator who comes out of retirement in his mid-sixties to operate a detective agency in Los Angeles, and Lee Meriwether as Betty Jones, his widowed daughter-in-law and secretary. In the fifth season, Mark Shera joined the cast as J. R. Jones, the son of Barnaby's younger cousin; he works for the firm while attending law school.

During the 1970s, detective series were very popular on American television. Barnaby Jones is unique because it features a private investigator who is much older than the typical detective and who relies on cunning and skill, including his extensive knowledge of forensics, rather than physical prowess and violence to solve crimes. Even though it was regularly threatened with cancellation, it ran for eight seasons and became the longest-running QM series after The FBI; repeats subsequently aired in syndication. The first episode, "Requiem for a Son," is a crossover with another QM series, Cannon, with William Conrad guest starring as detective Frank Cannon. The two-part episode "The Deadly Conspiracy," the opener for the fourth season, is another crossover between the two programs.

== Plot ==
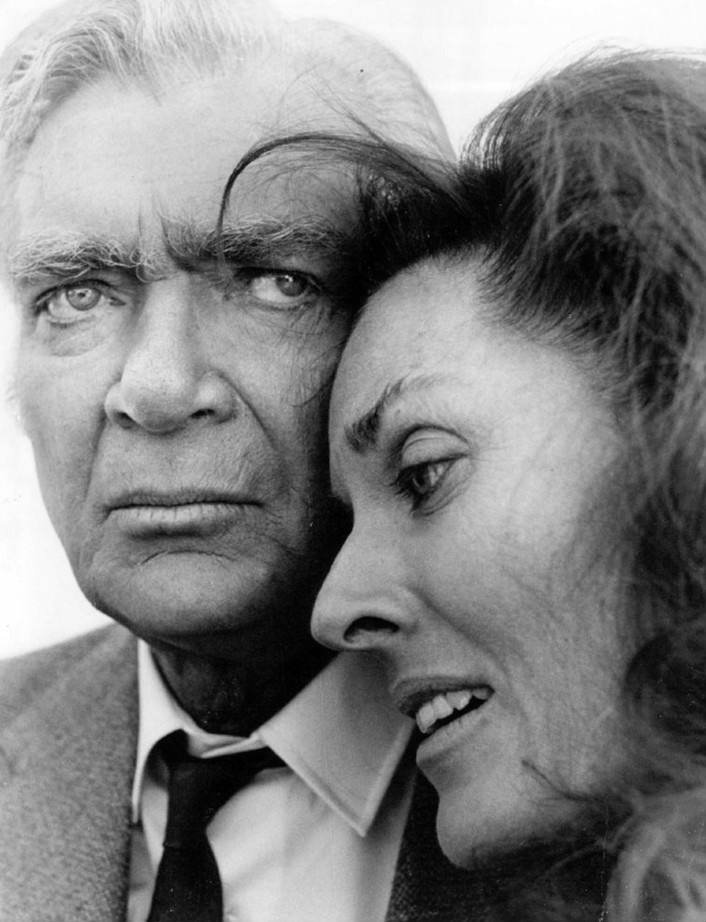
Ebsen and Meriwether

Barnaby Jones is a veteran private investigator in his mid-sixties. After a 28-year career at the Jones & Jones Investigative Agency in Los Angeles, he retires to his ranch outside the city, passing the business to his son, Hal. In the first episode of the series, Hal is murdered while working for a client, and Barnaby searches for the killer. After he solves the crime, he decides to come out of his four-year retirement and renames the firm the Barnaby Jones Investigative Agency. Hal's widow, Betty Jones, becomes his secretary. In the fifth season, Jedediah Romano (J. R.) Jones, the son of his younger cousin, joins the firm while attending law school. Although Barnaby has a variety of clients, he regularly investigates insurance fraud and other cases for California Meridian Insurance. His agency is located on the sixth floor of an office building in downtown Los Angeles, but exterior establishing shots actually portray the former Pacific Southwest Trust & Savings Bank at 234 East Colorado Boulevard in neighboring Pasadena. He drives a chocolate brown 1973 Ford LTD Brougham.

Each episode of the series begins with the portrayal of a crime, typically but not always a murder. The perpetrators include a rogue's gallery of fraudsters, kidnappers, rapists, thieves, drug dealers, psychopaths, adulterers, jilted spouses, and others, most of whom commit one or more homicides, sometimes accidentally. While most episodes reveal the culprit's identity from the beginning, some withhold it until later in the episode. The rest of the story follows Barnaby as he relies on cunning and skill to solve the case. Suspects frequently taunt him because of his age, but he compensates for his physical limitations with knowledge and experience. As he states in the first episode, his specialties are chemistry, clinical psychology, forensic medicine, and criminology. His office includes a forensics lab and a darkroom, which he often uses to solve cases. To prepare for the role, Ebsen visited what was then known as the Criminalistics Division of the Los Angeles County Sheriff's Department, where he learned how to use a stereoscopic microscope and other equipment. He stated that this experience added authenticity to his performance. Barnaby is a skilled shooter, but he uses his gun only when necessary, and he often aims to temporarily disable, rather than kill, attackers.

After a few seasons, Ebsen asked CBS and producer Martin to reduce his role so that he could spend more time with his family, following his wife's request that he quit entirely. Although they initially resisted—believing that the success of the series depended entirely on him—they eventually compromised starting in the sixth season. Under the new agreement, Ebsen anchored 12 episodes per season, while Meriwether and Shera each took the lead on six.

== Cast ==
=== Main cast ===
- Buddy Ebsen as Barnaby Jones: Barnaby is a private investigator in his mid-sixties. Ebsen described him as follows: "Besides being older, he approaches problems more calmly. Not that he's incapable of being worked up. He has compassion for the victim, compassion for the bereaved and compassion really for the convicted. Not that he's soft. He's an embodiment of what someone once said about a tough skipper—he's hard, but he's fair." He attributed his slow, deliberate physical movements in the show to the fact that he was raised in Florida, where "you learn to expend as little energy as possible" because of the high humidity. Although Ebsen himself drank alcohol, Barnaby was known, and sometimes teased, for ordering milk in restaurants and bars, contrary to the stereotypical hard-drinking detective. However, at the end of the episodes "Forfeit by Death" and "Blood Vengeance" he is seen toasting with a glass of wine, and at the beginning of "Final Judgment: Part 2" he is portrayed drinking hard liquor in despair because he blames himself for the death of a young woman.
- Lee Meriwether as Betty Jones: Betty is Barnaby's widowed daughter-in-law and secretary. She manages the office and provides invaluable assistance on all of his investigations, including research to locate suspects and evidence. As the series progresses, she plays a more active role in the agency's cases, leading some investigations on her own. In several episodes, she is threatened and apprehended by the suspects that Barnaby is investigating. Meriwether commented that she essentially played herself on the show and that her character changed as much as she did over the course of the series. In particular, she observed that "Betty seems to have gained strength out of necessity."
- Mark Shera as Jedediah Romano (J. R.) Jones (seasons 5–8): Shera joined the cast in the fifth season. He is the son of Barnaby's younger cousin, a sergeant with the Chicago Police Department who travels to Los Angeles to investigate the killing of his former partner. When his father is murdered, J. R. comes to Los Angeles to help Barnaby find the killer. After they solve the case, he joins Barnaby's agency and simultaneously attends law school (in the first episode in which he appears, he says that he has graduated and is studying for the bar, but he is portrayed for the remainder of the series as a student). Initially a somewhat angry young man, he soon becomes more easygoing and fun-loving. Producers added the character of J. R. to revitalize the series, which had sagged in the ratings in the previous season. Shera remarked: "Part of the reason that I think I was cast in 'Barnaby Jones' … was the quality of the character I played in 'S.W.A.T.' It's a different name, a different show, and a different character, of course, but there are a lot of similarities. They are both young, both Italian, both energetic and rash—the kind of guy who goes too far and must be brought down. Basically the same. One important difference is that J.R. … is more intelligent. He's allowed to think for himself, to grow his hair longer. He doesn't have to say things like Freeze!' 'Hold it!' and 'Come out with your hands up!' Plus, he's studying for the bar."
- John Carter as Lt. John Biddle (seasons 2–8; recurring role): Besides the Joneses, the only other major recurring character on the series is their police contact, Lt. John Biddle. The actor John Carter portrays a murder victim in the first-season episode "The Murdering Class." His first appearance as Lt. Biddle is in the second-season episode "Secret of the Dunes." He subsequently appears in 84 more episodes, though typically only briefly.
- Vince Howard as Lt. Joe Taylor (seasons 1–2; recurring role). Lt. Taylor appeared in four episodes.

=== Notable guest cast ===
Among the guest stars who appeared over the years were Conlan Carter and Gary Lockwood, who appear together in the third episode of the series, "Sunday: Doomsday," which aired on February 25, 1973. Other first-season guest stars include:

- Claude Akins
- Richard Anderson
- Meredith Baxter
- Carl Betz
- Bill Bixby
- Hank Brandt
- Geraldine Brooks
- Richard Bull
- Darlene Carr
- Jack Cassidy
- Dabney Coleman
- Jackie Coogan
- Glenn Corbett
- Cathy Lee Crosby
- Don Dubbins
- Meg Foster
- Robert Foxworth
- Anne Francis
- Lou Frizzell
- Lynda Day George
- Clu Gulager
- Richard Hatch
- James Hong
- Claudia Jennings
- Lenore Kasdorf
- Margot Kidder
- Geoffrey Lewis
- Ida Lupino
- George Maharis
- Nora Marlowe
- Kenneth Mars
- Roddy McDowall
- Claudette Nevins
- Leslie Nielsen
- Nick Nolte
- Robert Patten
- Don Porter
- Edward Power
- Stefanie Powers
- Robert Reed
- Janice Rule
- Wayne Rogers
- William Shatner
- Joan Tompkins
- Lurene Tuttle
- Jessica Walter
- Michael Zaslow

In later seasons, guest stars include Wayne Maunder, formerly on CBS's Lancer western series, and Ron Hayes, who plays Sheriff Oscar Hamlin in the episode "Target for a Wedding." Marshall Colt, later cast with James Arness on McClain's Law, guest stars in two episodes in 1979. Donald May plays the role of Curt Phillips in the 1978 episode "Blind Jeopardy". Character actress Lurene Tuttle plays Emily Carter, Betty's aunt, in the 1980 episode "The Killin' Cousin".

Many familiar actors made guest appearances, and others who were newcomers went on to become well-known, including:

- Jane Actman
- Michael Alldredge
- Jonathan Banks
- Fred Beir
- Tom Bower
- John Calvin
- Lawrence P. Casey
- Susan Dey
- John de Lancie
- John Dullaghan
- Larry Duran
- Gail Edwards
- Shelley Fabares
- Morgan Fairchild
- Ed Flanders
- Jonathan Frakes
- Eddie Garrett
- Ted Gehring
- Mark Goddard
- Larry Hagman
- Ed Harris
- Dee Wallace
- Linda Harrison
- David Hedison
- Don Johnson
- Tommy Lee Jones
- John Lasell
- Ken Lynch
- Don Keefer
- Lou Krugman
- Monte Markham
- Joseph Mell
- Vera Miles
- Read Morgan
- Patrick O'Neal
- Sean Penn
- John Ritter
- Albert Salmi
- George Sawaya
- Simon Scott
- Eric Server
- Madeleine Stowe
- Susan Sullivan
- William Swan
- Kelly Thordsen
- Arthur Tovey
- Daniel J. Travanti
- Joan Van Ark
- Charles Wagenheim
- John Ward
- Carl Weathers
- Robert Webber
- Arch Whiting
- Eve McVeagh
- James Woods
- Tony Young

Ebsen's real-life daughter, Bonnie Ebsen, appears in six episodes, while Meriwether's real-life daughter, Kyle Aletter-Oldham, appears in two. Future Trapper John, M.D. stars Pernell Roberts, Gregory Harrison, and Charles Siebert all make guest appearances in one episode each. Future WKRP in Cincinnati stars Loni Anderson and Gary Sandy make guest appearances as well.

== Production ==
=== Development ===
In 1971, Fred Silverman, head of programming at CBS, cancelled several of the network's rural comedies and variety shows, including The Beverly Hillbillies, the long-running sitcom in which Ebsen played Jed Clampett. However, he recognized Ebsen's appeal and asked producer Quinn Martin to develop a detective series starring the actor. During this era, detective shows were very popular. Martin, who founded QM Productions in 1960, specialized in this genre. His hit series up to that time include The Fugitive, The FBI, and Cannon, among others. Cannon, which stars William Conrad as Frank Cannon, a heavyset, middle-aged private detective who is also a gourmand, exemplifies the then-current trend to build detective shows around unconventional types. Other examples include Ironside, which stars Raymond Burr as a consultant to the San Francisco Police Department who is paralyzed from the waist down; Longstreet, which stars James Franciscus as a blind insurance investigator; and Columbo, which stars Peter Falk as the rumpled police detective Lieutenant Columbo. Barnaby Jones would become another example of this trend because of his age.

Originally, Ebsen's character was to be introduced on an episode of Cannon as a retired detective who returns to work after his son is murdered; this episode was initially conceived as the launch of a spinoff series starring Ebsen for the 1973–74 season. Martin was closely involved in the conception of the project, which was developed for television by Edward Hume, who developed Cannon. Hume also wrote the teleplay, based on a story by Adrian Samish, who worked on Cannon as well. In November 1972, Silverman reconceived the episode as the first show of a new series premiering in January 1973 as a midseason replacement for two sitcoms on its Sunday night schedule that CBS had abruptly cancelled, Anna and the King and The Sandy Duncan Show.

When Ebsen's agent, Jimmy McHugh, informed him of Silverman's proposal, he was skeptical. He did not fully trust Silverman, who had cancelled The Beverly Hillbillies, and he thought that the detective show market was saturated. Nevertheless, he later told a reporter that Silverman was determined to move forward with the project: "The thinking seemed to be, well, there's a fat detective and a lady detective and detectives that are blind, thin, crippled and rumpled. The only kind they didn't have was a mature detective." In addition, Silverman's proposal arrived after Ebsen had pitched to the producer Roger Gimbel a series he had written about a seagoing private detective in the mold of Dashiell Hammett's Sam Spade that would combine his dual interests in detective fiction and sailing. Gimbel, however, was preoccupied with filming a television movie titled A War of Children. "While I was waiting for Roger to get back," Ebsen observed, "Quinn Martin came up with Barnaby. No boats, but he was my kind of guy. A retired private eye, hates retirement, thinks like I do that it's walking death. His son is murdered and he comes out of retirement and ends up back in business again with the help of his daughter-in-law, Lee Meriwether." He ultimately agreed to do the series.

Before it premiered, Barnaby Jones cycled through several titles. It was originally called Parrish. Then Barnaby Cobb and Barnaby Flint were proposed, but Ebsen objected to the former because he thought that hostile critics would mock it, presumably by referencing Jed Clampett's iconic corn cob pipe. Eventually, during a meeting, Martin told Ebsen that he saw Barnaby "as sort of a foxy grandpa." Ebsen replied: "I see him as a cool, methodical human being; a shrewd judge of character engaged in the sometimes routine, sometimes exciting business of catching crooks." Martin nodded and told Ebsen to play him his way. Then he blurted out the word "Jones!" and asked Ebsen if he liked the name "Barnaby Jones." Ebsen replied, "Why not?"

Barnaby Jones debuted on Sunday, January 28, 1973, at 9:30 p.m., after The New Dick Van Dyke Show at 7:30 p.m., M*A*S*H at 8 p.m., and Mannix at 8:30 p.m. It was scheduled against The ABC Sunday Night Movie and The NBC Sunday Mystery Movie. Critics remarked that this slot was challenging and predicted the show's early demise. The first episode aired against the television premiere of part one of Lawrence of Arabia on ABC and an installment of Hec Ramsey on NBC. Much to the surprise of critics and Ebsen himself, however, it easily won its time slot, ranking as the 18th most popular show for the week ending January 28 (Hec Ramsey came in at 23 and Lawrence of Arabia at 39). Ebsen stated: "Although 'Barnaby' was perceived and fixed in the minds of the network brass as merely a thirteen-week replacement, the ratings by the end of the first half-season were of such substance that they were afraid to cancel it. Hedging, they purchased another twenty-three episodes." For the 1973–74 season, Barnaby Jones remained in the same time slot; but imitating The NBC Sunday Mystery Movie, CBS packaged it with Mannix as The CBS Mystery Double Feature. During the remainder of its eight-season run, CBS moved the show multiple times, typically as a counterprogramming strategy to draw viewers from popular shows on ABC and NBC.

=== Filming ===
The opening title sequence of Barnaby Jones features titles by Howard Anderson Jr., set to a musical theme by Jerry Goldsmith and narration by voice actor and announcer Hank Simms. Anderson, a good friend of Martin's, worked closely with him on many QM series. The title sequence begins with a motion graphic consisting of blue tiles that rapidly trace the outline and interior of a grid, symbolizing Barnaby tracking a suspect; suddenly, red tiles, some with fragments of the name "Barnaby Jones," like pieces of a puzzle, tumble over the blue grid and then resolve into a red grid emblazoned with white text spelling "Barnaby Jones A Quinn Martin Production," graphically suggesting that Barnaby always solves the puzzle of the crime. The motion graphic transitions to a filmed sequence portraying closeups of Ebsen, Meriwether, and beginning in the fifth season Shera, as well as the episode's guest stars, concluding with a frame showing a grid of jostled red tiles overlaid with the episode's title. Music supervisor John Elizalde hired Goldsmith, who composed music for many television series and films and was nominated for numerous Academy Awards and Emmy Awards, to compose the musical theme after his original choice, the composer and conductor André Previn, turned him down. One critic described Goldsmith's theme as follows: "The theme music said it all before the first frame of film ever reached the audience—a lilting melody, now plucky, now plaintive, rose and fell and speeded into a crescendo that to the end depended on orchestral strings. Nothing would be percussive, tormented, bizarre. Violence would be neat and minimal." Each episode is divided into four acts. In the first season, each act is designated with a subtitle (Act I, Act II, Act II, Act IV), a convention seen in other QM series. In subsequent seasons, the subtitles are used less frequently.

During the show's first season, Martin served as executive producer. He appointed Gene Levitt as producer and Adrian Samish as supervising producer, and they had the responsibility of ramping up production on a compressed schedule. Beginning in the second season, Philip Saltzman became the producer. Like other QM shows, Barnaby Jones had high production values, which Ebsen appreciated. He stated, however, that the show's first year was "rough … [b]ecause we were getting scripts third-hand—after 'The FBI' and 'Cannon.'" The first episode was directed by Walter Grauman, who had worked with Martin on The Untouchables and later on The Fugitive, The FBI, and other series; he would go on to direct 48 more episodes. Most episodes were filmed on location, which was typical of QM series. In fact, one journalist observed that five out of seven production days for each episode were typically filmed on location. As Martin once remarked, "Realistic locations are one of the most important things in filming our shows as far as I'm concerned." Howard Alston, who was executive production manager for both Cannon and Barnaby Jones, helped to find locations throughout Southern California and occasionally beyond. Some interiors, including Barnaby's office and generic sets dressed as prison cells and hospital rooms, were filmed at Samuel Goldwyn Studios in West Hollywood. In 1979, Shera stated that for each season, filming took place Monday to Friday, from May through January; 12- to 14-hours days were common. He further stated: "Because Barnaby is established, everything is controlled and planned. We shoot 10 to 12 pages of script per day, which gives us time for one walk-through of the scene and then we shoot. It means you have to come to the set prepared."

From its inception, Martin maintained a conservative creative vision for the series that prioritized intellect over action. As Meriwether observed, "Quinn stressed the fact that the amount of violence would be kept to a minimum .… He said, 'Let's not go with major fads. Let's keep our wardrobe conservative. Let's solve these mysteries with cleverness and cunning, not with strong hit 'em over the head stuff.' He wanted the kinds of stories that the audience would get right along with Buddy. He and the producers wanted very few stories where the audience would have pre-knowledge of the murderer and how Buddy was going to find them. It was more difficult to write the show that way, but that was a prerequisite on which Quinn insisted." She also remarked that the show's humor came from Ebsen: "Buddy wanted that in the show …. He wanted it light, wanted it easy. He wished they could write more humor into his character because he handled comedy so well."

Two episodes of Barnaby Jones were structured as pilots for possible spinoff series. The first is "A Ransom in Diamonds," which aired during the sixth season. In this episode, the manager of a jewelry store hires attorney Alexander Street (Felton Perry), who is black, and inexperienced private detective Stanley Donaldson (Sam Weisman), who is white—two friends who fought together in the Vietnam War—to help get his kidnapped wife back. Barnaby and J. R. become involved after the duo botches the first ransom attempt. The second is "The Killin' Cousin," which aired as the last episode of the series. The story, which was distinguished by its comedic overtones, focuses on private detective William Tarkington IV (Kenneth Mars), who suspects that Betty has murdered two of her relatives to gain an inheritance. Neither pilot was developed into a series.

=== Cancellation ===
In several seasons, unfounded rumors that CBS planned to cancel Barnaby Jones circulated in industry publications. In spring 1980 rumors of the show's pending cancellation intensified. CBS finally confirmed the show's cancellation on May 1 in its announcement of its fall 1980 primetime schedule, when it revealed that the series had been replaced by a new detective show starring Tom Selleck, Magnum, P.I. Writer Jonathan Etter stated: "Like Quinn Martin's other big hit, The FBI, Barnaby Jones was not canceled because of poor ratings. 'Nobody could believe it,' says [director] Michael Preece. 'It was still a hit, but I guess it was a hit with the wrong people. Older people loved it.' 'I think the series ended at the right time,' reflects Roy Stork. 'I think Buddy was pretty happy about it. Buddy always had his eye on the eight-year mark.'"

=== Reruns and syndication ===
From September 1978 to September 1980, CBS aired reruns of Barnaby Jones on Tuesday nights at 11:30 p.m. as part of The CBS Late Movie. After CBS cancelled the series, Worldvision Enterprises released it for syndication beginning in September 1980. It proved to be very successful in syndication. Beginning September 3, 2019, MeTV began broadcasting Barnaby Jones reruns.

== Episodes ==
| Season | Episodes | Originally released | |
| Season | Episodes | First released | Last released |
|---|---|---|---|
| 1 | 13 | January 28, 1973 | May 6, 1973 |
| 2 | 24 | September 16, 1973 | March 31, 1974 |
| 3 | 24 | September 10, 1974 | April 15, 1975 |
| 4 | 24 | September 19, 1975 | March 18, 1976 |
| 5 | 24 | October 7, 1976 | May 19, 1977 |
| 6 | 22 | September 15, 1977 | March 2, 1978 |
| 7 | 25 | September 21, 1978 | April 19, 1979 |
| 8 | 22 | September 20, 1979 | April 3, 1980 |

== Reception ==
=== Ratings ===
Ratings for the first season of Barnaby Jones exceeded Silverman's expectations. They declined considerably, however, in the third and fourth seasons. In his memoir, Ebsen recounts that during an affiliates' meeting at the beginning of the third season, Silverman complimented him on the show's success, but "then, fixing me with a meaningful stare, he raised his glass and said, 'Enjoy this year.' His words conveyed a message that could be perceived only one way: For 'Barnaby,' this would be the last year. So after gulping and accepting his pronouncement with some regret, I enjoyed a third year. I also enjoyed a fourth and a fifth and a sixth and seventh and even eighth; I'm also enjoying the residuals from syndicated reruns." The show's ratings recovered in the fifth season after Shera was added to the cast, but declined again in the eighth and final season. The table below provides the rank and rating of the show for each season.

| Season | Time slot | Rank | Rating |
|---|---|---|---|
| 1 (1972–73) | Sunday at 9:30 – 10:30 pm (EST) | 25 | 19.9 (Tied with The Little People and The ABC Wednesday Movie of the Week) |
| 2 (1973–74) | Sunday at 9:30 – 10:30 pm (EST) | 17 | 21.4 (Tied with Good Times) |
| 3 (1974–75) | Tuesday at 10:00 – 11:00 pm (EST) | 33 | 19.6 |
| 4 (1975–76) | Friday at 10:00 – 11:00 pm (EST) (September 19 – November 28, 1975); Thursday at 10:00 – 11:00 pm (EST) (December 4, 1975 – March 18, 1976) | 59 | |
| 5 (1976–77) | Thursday at 10:00 – 11:00 pm (EST) | 49 | 18.5 |
| 6 (1977–78) | Thursday at 10:00 – 11:00 pm (EST) | 22 | 20.6 |
| 7 (1978–79) | Thursday at 10:00 – 11:00 pm (EST) | 24 | 20.5 |
| 8 (1979–80) | Thursday at 10:00 – 11:00 pm (EST) (September 20 – November 29, 1979); Thursday at 9:00 – 10:00 pm (EST) (December 20, 1979 – April 3, 1980) | Not in the Top 30 | |

=== Reviews ===
Most initial reviews of Barnaby Jones were tepid. The Los Angeles Times declared: "This is still another Quinn Martin product which follows the usual formula of letting us see a murder committed, then watching the detective sew up the case. It's so predictable that it's getting to be an awful bore. Buddy, who plays a retired detective brought back into action when his son is murdered, plays Barnaby with a quiet, soft-spoken authority." The Hollywood Reporter found Ebsen to be appealing, but the series to be imitative: "CBS has decided to fight the competition of NBC's mystery movies with a formula, uninspired series that stars Buddy Ebsen as 'Peter Falk.' 'Barnaby Jones' is such a blatant copy of the 'Columbo' format it is almost a joke. … Regardless of the obvious similarity, the show is the typical professional Quinn Martin production, and Ebsen is very appealing." Variety predicted that the show was headed for cancellation: "The debut of Buddy Ebsen as a tv private eye unspooled as rather ordinary, slow-moving fare which failed to establish Ebsen as a detective with any particular flair that might translate into a forceful identification on the tube. It would appear that the new "second season" entry will have to rely on Ebsen's known tv drawing power—which is considerable. ... Combination of routine concept and extremely tough timeslot indicates a potential of only fair rating strength and a short life for 'Barnaby Jones.'" Numerous other reviews of the series were published during its run.

The television scholars Horace Newcomb and Robert S. Alley regarded Barnaby Jones to be of lower quality than other QM series, such as The Fugitive and The Streets of San Francisco: "In Cannon and Barnaby Jones, while an attempt is made to create character interactions, there is ultimately little to work with and the shows, while moderately successful, have little of the rich texture of earlier work." Martin himself distinguished QM's law enforcement shows, such as The Streets of San Francisco, which are based on institutions, events, and situations drawn directly from real life, from its private investigator shows, such as Barnaby Jones, which are entirely fictional. As he stated in an interview, "Barnaby and Cannon were fictitious characters doing stories we had to make up and then make seem real. The other is based on real stories that we had to fictionalize. In both cases you're trying to make a statement thematically, in every show, about something underneath the entertainment. But one is based on reality and one is completely made up." He continued: "I happened to like Streets of San Francisco. My taste personally goes more toward that than the other. Not that I don’t like Barnaby, and you can't only do one kind of thing, but the more I can deal with the truth and then dramatize it, then I like it."

=== Awards ===
Barnaby Jones was nominated for two Emmy Awards: Lee Meriwether for Outstanding Continuing Performance by a Supporting Actress in a Drama Series (1977) and William W. Spencer for Outstanding Cinematography for a Series (1979). Neither nominee won.

The series was also nominated for two Golden Globe Awards: Lee Meriwether for Best Performance by an Actress in a Television Series—Drama (1975 and 1976). Meriwether did not win for either nomination.

== Home media ==
On February 16, 2010, CBS DVD (distributed by Paramount) released season one of Barnaby Jones on DVD in Region 1 for the first time. The episode "The Murdering Class" has had the word "nigger" bleeped out when one of the characters speaks, although one can still hear the "n" sound of the word; because of this audio edit, the release is not called "The Complete First Season." The episodes on the DVD include their broadcast trailers. This edit also exists on the VEI release. As of September 2014, this release has been discontinued and is out of print.

On May 4, 2015, Visual Entertainment (VEI) announced it had acquired the rights to the series in Region 1. It was subsequently announced that VEI would release Barnaby Jones—The Complete Collection on DVD on December 15, 2015. The 45-disc set features all 179 episodes, sourced from both network and syndication analog videotape masters for Seasons 2–8 made in the 1970s and early 1980s. Season 1 is the 2010 digital remaster of the series (with the bleeped-out word), as well as a bonus prequel episode.

| DVD name | Ep# | Release date |
|---|---|---|
| Season One | 13 | February 16, 2010 |
| The Complete Collection | 179 | December 11, 2015 |

Barnaby Jones has also periodically been included on streaming platforms such as Amazon Prime Video.

== In other media ==
=== Film ===
In 1993, Ebsen reprised the role of Barnaby Jones in the film The Beverly Hillbillies, adapted from his television series of the same name (in the film, Jim Varney played Jed Clampett, the role that Ebsen had played on the television series). It was Ebsen's final theatrical feature film appearance. After it was released, Meriwether and Shera expressed interest in a Barnaby Jones reunion television movie, but could not talk Ebsen into joining the project.

=== Books ===
In 2017, Sizzling Cold Case: The Legend of Lori London: A Barnaby Jones Novel, written by Ebsen with Darlene Quinn, was published by AuthorHouse. In the novel, Barnaby investigates the death 18 years in the past of the starlet Lori London, which had been ruled a suicide. In the course of the investigation, he discovers a connection between London's death and the man who murdered his own son. Although Ebsen passed away in 2003, his widow Dorothy worked with Quinn to develop Ebsen's notes for the project into a novel.

== Themes and analysis ==
Barnaby Jones was the first major detective series featuring an "elderly" person as the lead (on December 18, 1972, a few weeks before it premiered, NBC aired the pilot for The Snoop Sisters, starring 72-year-old Helen Hayes and 67-year-old Mildrid Natwick as two crime-solving sisters; however, the series itself, part of The NBC Tuesday Night Mystery, did not begin until December 19, 1973). In this respect, it paved the way for future detective and investigative series featuring elderly leads, such as Switch, Murder She Wrote, and Matlock. One journalist noted that casting Ebsen as a detective "is unusual by TV standards. Barnaby Jones, you see, is old. Network programmers, who lust after the big dollars of younger viewers, have a knack for giving such characters a bum rap. More often than not, television's elderly get stereotyped as senile, feeble, silly, lecherous or worse." Another stated that Ebsen liked to call himself the "hero of the geriatric set."

Barnaby's age was so notable when it premiered that the character was cited in the US House of Representatives' 1977 Hearing Before the Select Committee on Aging addressing "Age Stereotyping and Television." This hearing was scheduled in the wake of the Age Discrimination Act of 1975, which directed the US Commission on Civil Rights to conduct a study of age discrimination by the federal government. Representative Claude Pepper of Florida, then 77, led the hearing, which included testimony from ABC, CBS, and NBC executives. In his statement, Harvey L. Shephard, CBS's vice president of programs, discussed the representation of the elderly on his network. He specifically cited Barnaby Jones as one of three CBS prime-time series with elderly characters in lead roles and described Barnaby "as a hard-working detective. His age, which is about 70, is utterly incidental to his ability to solve problems." In response to the brewing controversy over the termination of CBS news correspondent Eric Sevareid, due to the network's rule requiring retirement at 65, Shephard emphasized that age had no bearing on whether an actor was hired in the programming division, citing Ebsen as an example. In addition, the committee's staff review cited a study by George Gerbner, dean of the Annenberg School of Communications, noting that only 3 percent of the major characters on prime-time television were elderly, and of these, Barnaby was one of the only "positive characterizations."

Many commentators noted that a detective show starring an elderly hero who was talented enough to fight crime with his intellect rather than his fists was inspiring—especially to older viewers. In fact, in the early 1980s a fan club known as the Barnaby Jones Luncheon Club formed in New York. By the late 1980s it had over 800 members, most of whom were professional men in their fifties and above. For many years the club met for lunch every Wednesday at Le Vert-Galant restaurant at 109 West 46th St. One member declared: "'Barnaby Jones' encourages men not to give up at 65." Another member, an investigator, proclaimed: "I'm here because some people think that just because a guy has gray hair, he can't investigate or make arrests." Both Ebsen and Meriwether visited the club, and former President Richard M. Nixon, a close friend of Ebsen's and a fan of the show, was a member. After one lunch, Ebsen was served a piece of cheesecake and a large glass of milk, a nod to his character.

Critics, network executives, and even members of the show's production team struggled to explain why the public loved Barnaby Jones so much. Ralph Senensky, who directed three episodes, stated: "It was kind of the low-man on the totem pole at the network and to some degree with Quinn, … but it was the real money-maker in the end. It outlasted everything else." In contrast to other successful series of the 1970s, it was never a cultural touchstone that generated major buzz. As Martin observed, "It's a classic idea with a star that's well done. It will never be a show that gets a lot of attention." After the show had been cancelled, a critic corroborated this point of view in a tribute to the series: "No fanfare greeted his arrival. No one took much notice of his quiet, enduring success. No public bemoaning has marked his departure announced this spring and effective this September. 'Barnaby Jones' spoke most to the elderly, the thoughtful, the nonviolent, the sedate—not to idolatrous if fickle youth who set the trends of popular culture and choose television's next generation of superstars."

When interviewers asked Ebsen to explain the popularity of Barnaby Jones, he generally declined to speculate: "My position and policy is not to poke around around too much into blessings. … We just try to do good stories, use good actors and do it in a way that people believe it.'" Nevertheless, he identified the show's appeal in 1973 when he read a letter from a fan to a journalist: "Look, the character is an honest one …. Let me tell you about a letter Quinn Martin's office just sent over from a lady In Menlo Park. She says she and her two sons never miss [the show because] … 'it has suspense, humor, intelligence, folksy quality, good dialogue, a dandy image, a non-violent hero who doesn't smoke and likes people.' Actually, much of what the lady says about the character is true and the fact that Barnaby comes off as a real person, not a plastic performer, is a tribute to our producer Phil Saltzman and the Quinn Martin organization which developed and created the character." Saltzman himself said: "Each show has an intriguing puzzle, and it's pleasant to watch Barnaby unravel it. But there's nothing stomach churning, nothing to make you nervous. We're never nasty. At 11 o'clock, the people can switch off the set and go peacefully to bed."

Many observers, however, agreed that the core of the show's appeal was Ebsen himself. In his memoir, the actor recounted that Walter Grauman, who directed most of the episodes, once told him: "'This show has got every cliché, every gimmick that's ever been on any other PI show. There's nothing new in it. I don't know why anyone would want to watch it. Except for one thing,' he grinned. 'People like you.'" Elsewhere Grauman stated: "A generation grew up watching Buddy on 'The Beverly Hillbillies' and 'Davy Crockett …. "He's like part of the family, a friendly uncle." And Saltzman commented: "Buddy's own true character comes across often as he plays Barnaby .… They are both gentlemen—warm and courteous with a good sense of humor. They've both got a twinkle that people like." He also attributed Ebsen's appeal to his "gentleness," which was as soothing to viewers as the milk that Barnaby liked to drink.
