= Cannon (TV series) =

American detective television series (1971–1976)

- Genre: Action; Crime; Mystery; Drama
- Developed by: Edward Hume
- Starring: William Conrad
- Theme music composer: John Parker
- Country of origin: United States
- Original language: English
- No. of seasons: 5
- No. of episodes: 122 (list of episodes)

Production
- Executive producer: Quinn Martin
- Running time: 60 minutes
- Production companies: QM Productions; CBS Productions

Original release
- Network: CBS
- Release: September 14, 1971 – March 3, 1976

Related
- Barnaby Jones

Cannon is an American detective television series produced by Quinn Martin that aired from 1971 to 1976 on CBS. William Conrad played the title character, private detective Frank Cannon. The series was the first Quinn Martin production to run on a network other than ABC.

In total, there were 122 episodes, plus the series' pilot and a "revival" television film, The Return of Frank Cannon (1980).

== Synopsis ==
Frank Cannon is portrayed in the series as a veteran of the Korean War and former member of the Los Angeles Police Department. He is not only street smart but also appears to have an unusually high level of education outside the field of law enforcement. Besides his familiarity with several languages, he shows extensive knowledge of such diverse subjects as science, art, and history. Cannon is a widower, having lost his wife and son in a bomb attack while he was on the police force.

Conrad was an overweight actor, and the series, especially in its early episodes, makes frequent mention of Cannon's weight. His leitmotif in the musical score features a tuba, and is often used to accent these references. Other characters sometimes remark critically about his weight, while he himself jokes self-deprecatingly about his girth and great love of food. In fact, Cannon is an epicurean and a gourmet cook, who enjoys preparing lavish food for his friends and guests. Despite his large size, he is also a man of action. Throughout the series, Cannon displays skilled marksmanship, and a proficiency in hand-to-hand combat and the knifehand strike. While he prefers to use his wits to escape a difficult situation, he engages successfully in fistfights and shoot-outs with bad guys.

Plots revolve around Cannon solving crimes for a variety of clients. In a number of early episodes, he is hired by insurance companies to investigate losses. Other episodes involve him working for former police colleagues or other people from his past. In some cases, he is forced to clear himself of falsified charges. Many episode plot lines involve Cannon traveling and having to deal with various and sundry incompetent and/or corrupt law enforcement agencies and officials.

== Cast ==
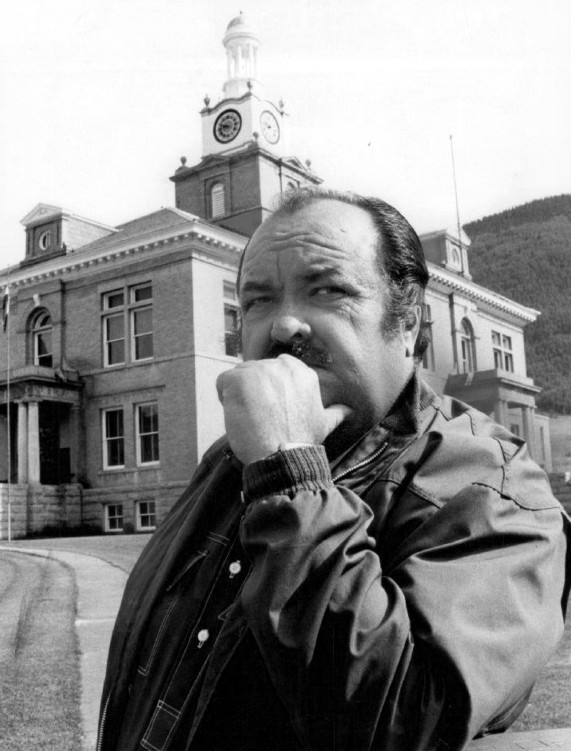
Conrad as Frank Cannon.

Series star William Conrad was the only main cast member.

Other than the title role, the series had very few recurring characters. Lawrence Pressman played Cannon's lawyer and confidant Herb Mayer in an introductory scene in the pilot movie, but the character did not return in the regular series. In the first season, Martin Sheen appeared twice as ex-policeman Jerry Warton, but the character did not extend beyond the first year. The only other actors to appear in multiple episodes as the same character were Charles Bateman (five episodes as Lieutenant Paul Tarcher) and Arthur Adams (three episodes as Officer Bill Murray).

=== Guest stars ===
Notable guest stars include Anne Baxter, Johnny Cash, Cathy Lee Crosby, Micky Dolenz, Nick Nolte, Joan Fontaine, Mark Hamill, Larry Linville, Sondra Locke, Denver Pyle, Leslie Nielsen, Susan Oliver, Stefanie Powers, Gordon Pinsent, Gary Lockwood, Roy Scheider, Geoffrey Lewis, Robert Goulet, Martin Sheen, Kay Lenz, David Janssen, Shelley Duvall, Jay Silverheels, Buddy Ebsen, and Vera Miles.

== Production ==
Cannon debuted as a TV movie on March 26, 1971, which served as the pilot. The case and plot are adapted from the 1958 novel Talk of the Town by Charles Williams, who is not credited. In the movie, Cannon returns from an extensive overseas assignment and visits a small town to investigate the murder of a close friend. A later episode would reveal that his wife and child were killed by a car bomb meant for him, prompting him to retire from the Los Angeles police force and become a private detective. The pilot was picked up as a regular series for the 1971–72 television season, and the first one-hour episode aired September 14, 1971.

The first season aired on Tuesday nights at 9:30 Eastern, following the popular police procedural Hawaii Five-0. Cannon was the only stand-alone 1971 debut network prime time show that was renewed for a second season (Columbo, the only other debut renewal, was part of the NBC Sunday Mystery Movie package)—this was the only season in TV history when only one debut show was renewed.

The series moved to 10:00 pm Wednesdays in the second season, and then up to 9:00 pm Wednesdays for the third season, where it remained for the rest of the series' run. Following three consecutive seasons in the Top 20 Nielsen ratings, plot violence and controversial themes increased in season five and Cannon fell to 39th in the ratings and was cancelled.

=== Cars ===
Throughout the series' run, Cannon drove Lincoln Continentals. In the pilot movie, he drove a 1970 model year 53A four-door hardtop sedan, which later crashed. In the series, he switched to the two-door personal luxury cars, driving a new model year every season – in Season 1, he drove a 1971 Mark III, before switching to Mark IVs for later seasons. In the 1980 TV movie, he drove a 1978 Cadillac Coupe de Ville which had been customized into a convertible.

=== Props ===
In an era before cell phones, Cannon was frequently shown using a car phone in his signature Lincoln Continental. Phones of this type were precursors to modern mobile phones, and very rare at the time. The phone prop itself was a Motorola brand IMTS car phone.

== Episodes ==
=== Series overview ===
Season	Episodes	Originally released		Rank	Rating
Season	Episodes	First released	Last released	Rank	Rating
Pilot		March 26, 1971		—N/a	—N/a
1	24	September 14, 1971	March 14, 1972	28	19.8 (Note: Tied with Room 222)
2	24	September 13, 1972	March 21, 1973	14	22.4
3	25	September 12, 1973	March 20, 1974	9	23.1 (Note: Tied with The Mary Tyler Moore Show)
4	24	September 11, 1974	April 2, 1975	20	21.6 (Note: Tied with Mannix)
5	25	September 10, 1975	March 3, 1976	39	—N/a (Note: Tied with Hawaii Five-0)
Television film		November 1, 1980		—N/a	—N/a

=== Connections to Barnaby Jones ===
Barnaby Jones was helmed by Cannon developer Edward Hume for producer Quinn Martin. The premiere episode, "Requiem for a Son", was planned as a second-season Cannon episode, but when Barnaby Jones was sold as a separate series the script was reworked into the premiere of that series. William Conrad appears as a special guest star in the episode.

Barnaby Jones (played by Buddy Ebsen) is an aging veteran private investigator who had retired and turned over his agency to his son, Hal, when Hal is killed. With the aid of Frank Cannon and Hal's widow, Betty Jones (Lee Meriwether), he hunts down Hal's killer. Afterwards, Jones decides to come out of retirement.

Cannon had a second crossover with Barnaby Jones in the 1975 two-part episode, "The Deadly Conspiracy". The first part aired as the second episode of the fifth season of Cannon on September 17, 1975, and the second part aired two nights later as the fourth-season premiere of Barnaby Jones.

== Home media ==
CBS DVD (distributed by Paramount) has released the first two seasons of Cannon on DVD in Region 1. Season 3 was released on January 10, 2013, via Amazon.com's CreateSpace program. This is a manufacture-on-demand (MOD) release, available exclusively through Amazon.com.

On May 4, 2015, it was announced that Visual Entertainment had acquired the rights to the series in Region 1. They subsequently released Cannon – The Complete Collection on September 2, 2015.

On March 18, 2016, VEI re-released the first season on DVD and on April 1, 2016, they re-released the second season.

In Region 4, Shock Entertainment has released the first two seasons on DVD in Australia.

DVD name	Ep no.	Release date
Season 1, Volume 1	13	July 8, 2008
Season 1, Volume 2	13	December 2, 2008
Season 1	24	March 18, 2016
Season 2, Volume 1	12	June 2, 2009
Season 2, Volume 2	12	February 16, 2010
Season 2	24	April 1, 2016
Season 3	24	January 10, 2013
Season 4	24	N/A
Season 5	25	N/A
The Complete Series	122	September 2, 2015

== Awards and nominations ==
Cannon received three Emmy Award nominations: for Outstanding Drama Series in 1973, and for William Conrad as Lead Actor in a Drama Series in 1973 (won by Richard Thomas of The Waltons) and 1974 (won by Telly Savalas of Kojak).

The Hollywood Foreign Press Association nominated Cannon for three Golden Globe Awards: for Best Television Series – Drama in 1974, and for William Conrad in 1972 and 1973 as Best Actor in a Drama Television Series.

== In other media ==
=== Novels ===
A series of nine original tie-in novels were published in the 1970s by Lancer and Magnum in the United States; and in the UK by Triphammer (an imprint of World Distributors), Star (an imprint of W.H. Allen) and Corgi.

Only the first two, by Richard Gallagher (not to be confused with the pseudonym of Len Levinson), were published in the US, and both would be reprinted as part of the Triphammer line in the UK.

1. Murder by Gemini (Lancer, reissued by budget imprint Magnum)
2. The Stewardess Strangler (Lancer)

The remaining seven were by prolific British pulpsmith Douglas Enefer. The first five of those appeared under the pseudonym Paul Denver. This may have been because Enefer was creator and editor of the Triphammer imprint and didn't want the byline indicating that he'd commissioned himself. He maintained the byline when Star took on the series and abandoned the pretense when the final two were published by Corgi. Why and how the book series moved through three British publishers while remaining exclusive to the same tie-in author is unknown. In a slight departure from the TV series, whose only continuing character was Frank Cannon, Enefer created a few recurring characters, including a young assistant investigator. The British titles (and US reprints) were unnumbered.

3. The Golden Bullet as by Paul Denver (Douglas Enefer, Triphammer)
4. The Deadly Chance as by Paul Denver (Triphammer)
5. I've Got You Covered as by Paul Denver (Triphammer)
6. The Falling Blonde as by Paul Denver (Star)
7. It's Lonely on the Sidewalk as by Paul Denver (Star)
8. Farewell, Little Sister by Douglas Enefer (as himself, Corgi)
9. Shoot-Out! by Douglas Enefer (Corgi)

While most of the British release covers featured photos of star William Conrad alone, three notable exceptions showed him alongside guest stars. On The Falling Blonde, the featured guest star is Lynne Marta, who appeared in the pilot movie and the episodes "Girl in the Elecric Coffin" and "Deadly Heritage"; this was a photo. The other two exceptions appear on the only covers sporting rendered artwork rather than photos. On Farewell, Little Sister, the pictured guest star is Ralph Waite—who never actually appeared in a Cannon episode—as a plainclothes detective in a police car behind Cannon; and on "Shoot-Out", the pictured guest star is Monte Markham—being arrested by Cannon at shotgun point—who appeared in the episode "Vengeance". The random use of Waite's likeness suggests that at least the painted guest star images were unlicensed and have nothing to do with the context of any filmed episode.

== Parody ==
In a 1976 episode of his Thames Television series, British comedian Benny Hill parodies 1970s American detective series in a sketch called "Murder on the Oregon Express". In it, Hill and the cast play numerous staple characters of the genre, including both Frank Cannon and Barnaby Jones.
