= Duane Tatro =

American composer (1927–2020)

- Born: May 18, 1927; Van Nuys, Los Angeles, California, U.S.
- Died: August 9, 2020 (aged 93); Bell Canyon, California, U.S.
- Education: University of Southern California
- Occupation: Composer
- Spouse: Francoise Tatro
- Children: 2 sons, 1 daughter

Duane Tatro (May 18, 1927 – August 9, 2020) was an American composer. Born in Los Angeles, he served in the United States Navy during World War II and he graduated from the University of Southern California. He became a composer for many television series, including Dynasty, The Love Boat, Barnaby Jones, M*A*S*H, Mannix, and The F.B.I..
