= List of S.W.A.T. (1975 TV series) episodes =

This is a list of episodes for the ABC television series S.W.A.T.

The pilot for this series was a two-part episode of The Rookies titled "S.W.A.T." (February 17, 1975).

== Series overview ==
Season	Episodes	First aired	Last aired
1	12	February 24, 1975	May 26, 1975
2	25	September 13, 1975	April 3, 1976

== Episodes ==
=== Season 1 (1975) ===
No. overall	No. in season	Title	Directed by	Written by	Original release date	Filming order
1	1	"The Killing Ground"	Harry Falk	Rick Husky	February 24, 1975	001
Officers Jim Street and Robert Duran of the WCPD's Olympic Precinct, dispatched to a fake emergency call, are ambushed by a trio of cop killers; the newly-established Olympic SWAT team arrives, led by Lt. Daniel "Hondo" Harrelson, but the gunmen escape, leaving Duran dead and Street devastated. The shooting is just one more casualty in a series of ambushes by the trio to avenge the death of gunman Dallas's uncle, allegedly in police custody. Street opts to attend SWAT training in the hopes of avenging Duran, and Hondo selects Street for the team alongside natural marksman Travis Joseph "T.J." McCabe. The attacks continue as the gang prepares one final ambush before fleeing the city, but SWAT catches on and moves to disrupt them; in the ensuing operation, two of the gunmen are apprehended and Street kills the last, but he realizes revenge is meaningless and can never satisfy him. As the gunmen are booked, Hondo reveals their revenge was based on a misunderstanding — Dallas's uncle had killed himself to avoid arrest — and muses on the pointlessness of killing before returning to duty with his team. ^ cast
2	2	"A Coven of Killers"	George McCowan	Skip Webster	March 3, 1975	002
Joey Hopper is broken out of a hospital prison ward by the Hopper family, a violent Satanic cult led by Joey composed of disaffected youths, responsible for a string of brutal murders and narcotics crimes. As Olympic SWAT joins the citywide manhunt for the Hopper family, Hondo finds himself targeted by Joey for having apprehended him earlier, while an underground newspaper editor at odds with the WCPD turns to Hondo for help when his daughter is drawn into the Hopper family. Tracking them down to a remote farmhouse, SWAT besieges the Hopper family and uses tear gas to smoke them out, while Joey is killed when he takes the editor's daughter as a human shield. With the threat subsided, Hondo celebrates his anniversary with his wife Betty, initially interrupted by the manhunt. ^ cast
3	3	"Death Carrier"	Harry Falk	Robert Hamner	March 10, 1975	003
Frank Thomas is shot and killed by a sniper on the freeway, the third in a string of calculated yet seemingly random sniper attacks. As Olympic SWAT investigates, they learn two of the men dated the same woman, fashion model Janet Warren. Hondo devises a plan to draw out the sniper: having a SWAT officer go undercover as her new boyfriend. Street is selected for the role, and gradually falls in love with Janet, but becomes targeted by the sniper, Eric, a dressmaker working in Janet's company seeking to make her fall in love with him. When Eric kidnaps Janet, Street catches on and trails him to the coast, where SWAT battles him while Hondo scales a cliff to flank him, eventually reaching Eric and Janet in time to kill Eric before he can kill Janet in a murder–suicide. Though she is no longer under threat, Janet, shaken by the losses she endured, decides to leave the city, and visits Street and the team one last time to bid farewell. ^ cast
4	4	"Pressure Cooker"	George McCowan	Walter Black	March 17, 1975	004
With Olympic SWAT busy handling standoffs and monitoring an APB on a kidnapped high school girl, freelance writer Meredith Cooper is embedded with SWAT for a human interest article in a magazine. Cooper is infamous in the WCPD as a staunch police critic who views SWAT as "a necessary evil, but more evil than necessary", but they cooperate nonetheless. However, the day's difficulties worsen when Hondo, already struggling with SWAT calls interrupting his family life, is called to the hospital during a standoff after his son is struck by a car and injured. Later, SWAT is deployed for a plainclothes takedown when the kidnapped girl is spotted on a ferry, but when Cooper follows the team aboard and unintentionally provokes the kidnapper, the officers are forced to shoot. With the day finally over, Hondo finds time to get his family life together. ^ cast
5	5	"Hit Men"	Harry Falk	David P. Harmon	March 24, 1975	005
Infamous drug kingpin Vincent Ritchie agrees to testify against his former associates before a committee, but is critically injured and hospitalized after his police escort is ambushed. Olympic SWAT is assigned to the hospital to protect him, while Officer Dominic Luca enters a relationship with his disaffected daughter—but the situation becomes tense when a police ploy uncovers a mole in the hospital staff, sent to confirm Ritchie's death. With Ritchie scheduled for one final surgery, his former associates deploy a team of hitmen to assassinate him by any means necessary, but SWAT manages to fight them off, only for Luca and Hondo to catch Ritchie's daughter trying to kill him on her own terms. Ritchie ultimately survives and reveals dozens of crime bosses to police and the public, while Luca accepts he is still single. ^ cast
6	6	"Jungle War"	George McCowan	Charles Eric Johnson	March 31, 1975	006
Bo Pritchard, Hondo's comrade from the Vietnam War and a known cowboy cop trying out for SWAT, joins Hondo and Sgt. David "Deacon" Kay at the scene of a botched burglary. When Deacon is shot by the suspect and Bo shoots the suspect despite the team having him at gunpoint, Hondo chooses to hire Bo as a temporary replacement while Deacon is hospitalized. However, Bo's violent and uncooperative nature leads to tensions between him and the team, worsened when Bo covertly threatens Deacon with full replacement in SWAT. When Bo escalates another hostage-taking and forces T.J. to shoot the mentally-disturbed suspect, Hondo kicks Bo off the team. Bo suffers a mental breakdown and kidnaps Betty to draw Hondo out to fight him personally; Hondo obliges and, after a brief fistfight in a warehouse, manages to defeat Bo and rescue Betty. In the aftermath, Deacon fully recovers and is brought back to the team. ^ cast
7	7	"Death Score"	Phil Bondelli	Story by : Larry Alexander; Teleplay by : Robert Hamner and Larry Alexander	April 7, 1975	007
Olympic SWAT responds to a sniper targeting an ambassador, committed by the "Organization for the Freedom of Oppressed People", purportedly a Middle Eastern left-wing terrorist group active in California. Unbeknownst to the police, the Organization is actually a front for a criminal group, part of a complex plot to rob the Owls basketball team (one player of which, Ollie, is a longtime friend of T.J.'s) for $2 million, using the terrorist charade as a way to pressure the authorities into acquiescing to their demands. When the group launches their attack at the Sports Arena and takes the Owls hostage, Hondo's attempts to negotiate a release are stymied by political pressure and the wounding of a player, and he is forced to follow their demands. However, quick thinking from Ollie and strategic placement of the team leads to the entire group being apprehended and the Owls being freed. ^ cast
8	8	"The Bravo Enigma"	Phil Bondelli	Herb Bermann	April 28, 1975	009
Olympic SWAT is assigned to protect a U.S. Senator, known for his strong anti-gambling stance, and rescues him from an attack by frogmen. With the attempted assassination a failure, a gambling magnate hires a professional hitman from overseas, who steals an ArmaLite AR-18 from a National Guard armory and prepares an ambush while enjoying himself in the United States. However, when several people the hitman comes into contact with—including the gambling magnate, a National Guardsman, a young boy, a waiter, and his date—fall ill with a severe form of pneumonic plague last reported in India, SWAT is pressured to find the increasingly-ill hitman before he potentially sparks a deadly epidemic. The hitman's attempt on the Senator's life fails, and SWAT pursues him to a water reservoir, but he falls in and dies before he can be apprehended. ^ cast
9	9	"The Steel-Plated Security Blanket"	George McCowan	Fred Freiberger	May 5, 1975	010
An empty armored car is stolen from a security company overnight. Though no valuables were stolen, Olympic SWAT is alerted, as the armored car is practically impenetrable and could be used for anything from robberies to terrorist attacks. As SWAT follows up on the armored car theft, T.J. brings Luca to the American Beauty Contest, where his fiancée Susan works as a photographer; unbeknownst to them, the contest is the target of the armored car's thieves, a gang of veterans seeking to steal the bejeweled crown and scepter worn by the winning girl, worth over $2 million. The gang disguises themselves as the armored car crew scheduled to retrieve the crown and scepter, but takes Susan and the winning girl, Miss New Mexico, hostage in the armored car when they learn the crown and scepter used in the event is a fake copy, stealing the real one from the event organizers. SWAT surrounds the van and, after an intense standoff, manages to use paint shells and a flare launcher modified to fire gas to smoke out the fake guards and rescue Susan and Miss New Mexico. ^ cast
10	10	"Omega One"	Earl Bellamy	Phyllis White, Robert White and Wilton Denmark	May 12, 1975	011
At Street's university, students prepare to protest the Biological Weapons Convention, which they believe was not followed by the U.S. military, and an alleged experimental biological warfare program by Omega Chemicals involving Dr. Brunner, Street's professor. However, a group of radicals led by Stockwell use the protest as a cover to take over the Omega One chemical plant and demand a $1 million ransom lest the plant explodes, taking Brunner and his wife hostage. Olympic SWAT, following up on a gun shop robbery related to the radical plot, is alerted to the attack. With the radicals setting a deadline of just three hours, Hondo delivers the ransom while the rest of the team infiltrates the plant to apprehend the gunmen. After Stockwell takes Hondo as a human shield and T.J. shoots him, Brunner remembers the plant's override code—the date of the attack on Pearl Harbor, Franklin D. Roosevelt's "day of infamy"—preventing the explosion and saving the city. ^ cast
11	11	"Blind Man's Bluff"	George McCowan	Walter Black	May 19, 1975	012
During a standoff at a massage parlor, Hondo is grazed in his head. Though he survives and refuses medical attention, the injury begins to take its toll: his vision blurs, he becomes disoriented and aggravated more often, and he nearly faints at a standoff. Finally accepting the injury affected him more than he thought, Hondo learns he has a concussion and decides to retire from frontline duty, handing command of Olympic SWAT to Lt. Purcell, a rough commander from Riverside Precinct who is often at odds with the team. However, Hondo decides he is dissatisfied with desk work and opts to undergo a risky surgery to undo the damage. The operation is a success and Hondo returns to commanding Olympic SWAT, successfully resolving a hostage situation through negotiation alone. ^ cast
12	12	"Sole Survivor"	Earl Bellamy	Sean Baine	May 26, 1975	013
Olympic SWAT shoots and arrests a gunman in an amusement park, devastating his young son, who may be without parents as his mother is hospitalized following a heart attack. When the boy runs away from his youth shelter, Hondo finds him checking on his mother, and offers to let him stay in the Harrelson household for the time being. Meanwhile, a former parole officer scopes out SWAT's response in preparation for a heist at a coin collection auction; his crew plans to use a series of random shootings and explosions as a diversion. The heist is pulled off, and the diversion is launched; the police are initially fooled, but SWAT catches on when a silent alarm at the auction breaks from the pattern. The team deploys to the auction and apprehends the heist crew, while the boy's mother eventually recovers and takes custody of him. ^ cast

=== Season 2 (1975–76) ===
No. overall	No. in season	Title	Directed by	Written by	Original release date	Filming order
13	1	"Deadly Tide"	Gene Levitt	Benjamin Masselink	September 13, 1975	015–A
14	2	"Deadly Tide"	Gene Levitt	Benjamin Masselink	September 13, 1975	015–B
A crew of thieves pull off a string of violent robberies with the same modus operandi: they hold up a jewelry store, take a woman hostage, and use her to intimidate the responding officers and get away before they can pursue. In reality, the woman is part of the crew, who are planning to offload their loot and get away using diving equipment at the docks, using a dive center as a front. Olympic SWAT is as confused as the rest of the police department, but the suspicious murder of a fisherman known to Hondo by one of the thieves leads them to connect the dots. ^ cast
15	3	"Kill S.W.A.T."	George McCowan	Robert Hamner	September 20, 1975	017
A training exercise with another division's SWAT team is interrupted by the murder Officer Frank Baylor, (Note: Don Eitner as Officer Frank Baylor) found with the words "Kill S.W.A.T." pinned to his chest. Olympic SWAT soon learns the murder is just the first in a series of attacks targeting SWAT officers by two brothers and their fanatic sister-in-law, who seek to avenge her husband's death in the first ever SWAT deployment. ^ cast
16	4	"Dealers in Death"	George McCowan	Story by : L.T. Bentwood; Teleplay by : Robert Hamner	September 27, 1975	014
Olympic SWAT is called in to handle crimes committed by suspects carrying powerful automatic weapons. Luca and T.J. are sent on an undercover assignment to discover the source of the weapons. ^ cast
17	5	"Time Bomb"	George McCowan	Dick Nelson	October 4, 1975	008
After training with a (then-new) beeper at a movie studio, Street picks up his girlfriend, but remembers he forgot his beeper and returns to the studio to retrieve it. While there, Street and his girlfriend find themselves in the middle of a bombing plot by a disgruntled stuntman and his team to extort the studio and destroy the film sets—but with the security guard murdered, the entire studio occupied, and his equipment back at the station, Street and his girlfriend fight to survive and call for help before the bombs can go off. ^ cast
18	6	"The Vendetta"	Bob Kelljan	Robert I. Holt	October 11, 1975	016
The Brewer brothers are arrested by Olympic SWAT for trying to prevent the demolition of their home by construction magnate Carl Rigby. Meanwhile, Mel Lang (Note: Paul Mantee as Mel Lang) and Ralph Costa, (Note: Aldo Ray as Ralph Costa) a pair of ex-convicts who were reported by Rigby and arrested by Hondo, seek to exact their revenge against them, and kidnap the Brewer brothers, seeking to frame them for the planned murders. ^ cast
19	7	"Criss-Cross"	Fernando Lamas	Edward J. Lakso	October 18, 1975	020
Two teenagers seeking shelter in the warehouse of Colby Electronics anonymously alert Olympic SWAT after a group of criminals break in and kill two police officers. Before they can escape, a teenager sees the face of one of the criminals—former U.S. Senator Greg Colby. (Note: Carl Betz as U.S. Senator Greg Colby) Learning he has been seen, Colby befriends Hondo to follow up on the investigation, in the hopes the police will identify the witness and allow him to assassinate them. ^ cast
20	8	"Vigilante"	Bruce Bilson	Walter Black	October 25, 1975	019
Paul Julian (Note: Harris Yulin as Paul Julian) uses a radio scanner to listen to police radio frequencies in the back of his repair shop. Though on the surface he presents this as a hobby, in reality he uses it to operate as a vigilante sniper and kill suspects, even those who have surrendered, as a way to avenge his murdered wife. After Julian intervenes in two standoffs that would have been resolved peacefully, Olympic SWAT, facing intense media pressure and accusations of being behind the shootings, seeks to stop Julian before another killing—without knowing he is actually their own radio repairman. ^ cast
21	9	"Courthouse"	Don Weis	Story by : Jimmy Sangster; Teleplay by : Robert I. Holt	November 1, 1975	021
Olympic SWAT intervenes in a daring heist at the race track and apprehends Howard Wilson, (Note: Bill Fletcher as Howard Wilson) one of the robbers. His escaped accomplices, aided by unscrupulous attorney Jason Bridges, (Note: H. M. Wynant as Jason Bridges) work to get the charges dropped and make Wilson a free man—by force. ^ cast
22	10	"Ordeal"	Sutton Roley	Charles Eric Johnson	November 8, 1975	022
Olympic SWAT is assigned to help transport convicted dope dealer Johnny Rizi (Note: Frank Gorshin as Johnny Rizi) to prison, but his former associates seek to silence him before he can testify against them. After escaping a sniper attack at the heliport, Hondo joins Rizi in a police helicopter flight to the jail and cuffs himself to him, but learns too late that the helicopter has been sabotaged by the hit-men. When the helicopter crashes in a remote valley, an injured Hondo is only able to radio in his rough location, drawing the team — and the hit-men — to search the area for Hondo and Rizi, who must learn to trust each other to survive in the wilderness. ^ cast
23	11	"Strike Force"	Sutton Roley	Charles Eric Johnson	November 15, 1975	018
General James Woodward, (Note: John Dehner as General James Woodward) a war hero turned self-styled American Nationalist leader, prepares to launch his political campaign, but faces staunch opposition from both the public and from within, as Woodward's aides plan to launch a putsch and assassinate him on live television. Olympic SWAT is reluctantly assigned to provide security, but tensions arise between the Nationalists and the team over Deacon's race. An attack by "black militants" (really a group within General Woodward's movement in blackface) draws heavy security to a televised rally and sets the assassination in place, but Olympic SWAT sees through the plan and defeats the assassins. ^ cast
24	12	"The Swinger"	Barry Crane	Jack V. Fogarty	November 22, 1975	024
Prosecutor John Stevens (Note: Ed Gilbert as John Stevens) holds secret information which could convict two syndicate chieftains of capital crimes. Because Stevens insists on saying nothing until the grand jury convenes, and because police believe the mob has put out a major contract on Stevens, Olympic SWAT is assigned to protect him. However, the syndicate's enforcer plans to abduct the Stevens' daughter Tory (Note: Jane Alice Brandon as Tory) and keep the girl until the father turns over the evidence. Oblivious to the danger, Tory is out for kicks as both the police and the syndicate to track her down. ^ cast
25	13	"Terror Ship"	George McCowan	Story by : Robert I. Holt and S. Rodger Olenicoff; Teleplay by : Robert I. Holt	November 29, 1975	025
A group of men steal a tugboat and barge laden with twelve cases of TNT, killing the tugboat captain in the process. They later threaten to blow up a Nobel Prize-winning marine biologist and her research vessel unless they are given one million dollars. ^ cast
26	14	"Murder by Fire"	William Crain	John Monks, Jr.	December 6, 1975	026
Marco, (Note: Peter Breck as Marco) an arsonist posing as a firefighter, engineers a fire during Southern California's dry season in the area's most affluent neighborhood, Sherwood Heights. While looting the evacuated home of a wealthy couple, one of Marco's men shoots a fireman. When Olympic SWAT is called in to locate the sniper, McCabe is shot and gravely wounded. The team kills one of the snipers, but Marco and the rest of his gang escape with a truckload of stolen merchandise. This episode has an error near the end in the use of stock footage from an earlier episode of the team springing from the back of the truck into action, showing McCabe as the last man out. However, McCabe was in the hospital from the wounding at the beginning of the episode, and appears in the last scene at the hospital. ^ cast
27	15	"Silent Night, Deadly Night"	Bruce Bilson	Herb Bermann	December 13, 1975	027
Hondo's old friend, millionaire Doris Wainwright Bristol, (Note: Anne Francis as Doris Wainwright Bristol) has brought expensive jewelry into the hospital where she is undergoing cosmetic surgery. Her bodyguard, Joe DeLeon, (Note: Frank Campanella as Joe DeLeon) is slain after he spots criminal Frank Malloy (Note: Michael Callan as Frank Malloy) posing as a dying patient; all part of a plot to steal Doris' jewelry. Olympic SWAT, who along with Hilda (Note: Rose Marie as Hilda) are at the hospital preparing for the children's Christmas party, find themselves forced into action when the discovery of DeLeon's body leaves Doris unprotected. ^ cast
28	16	"The Running Man"	George McCowan	Robert Hamner	January 24, 1976	028–A
29	17	"The Running Man"	George McCowan	Robert Hamner	January 24, 1976	028–B
David Neal, (Note: Stuart Whitman as David Neal) a government agent who spent four years on an undercover assignment posing as a crime boss's lieutenant, is marked for death after his testimony sends the kingpin to prison for life. After the trial, a $500,000 bounty is put on the head of Neal, who begins a new life in a small town as Ben Jordan. However, his police instincts come to the fore and he soon finds himself embroiled in another battle with organized crime. ^ cast
30	18	"Lessons in Fear"	Dick Moder	Daniel B. Ullman	January 31, 1976	030
Lt. Harrelson and his team are called to investigate two robberies in which powerful drills, cutting equipment and dynamite are stolen. During the investigation, Luca sets up a double date for himself and T.J. with Sharon Merlingdale, (Note: Monie Ellis as Sharon Merlingdale) a witness from another case and a student at a prestigious all-girls school, and a classmate. The thieves, who are planning to use the school as an entry point to a bank vault across the street, were counting on the school being empty for the weekend. When the girls agree to stay the weekend for their dates, they unwittingly place themselves and Luca in grave danger. ^ cast
31	19	"Deadly Weapons"	Reza Badiyi	Robert I. Holt	February 21, 1976	023
Bud Haskins, (Note: Eric Boles as Bud Haskins) whose father John is moving large quantities of unmarked automatic weapons as part of his warehouse operation, agrees to help three men crack open the safe in the elder Haskins' warehouse. Bud has had a falling out with his father and wishes to steal some of the money in the safe. When the thieves attempt to steal some of the weapons, Bud is killed trying to stop them. While Olympic SWAT is assigned to investigate the burglary-murder as part of their ongoing effort to locate the source of the weapons, John Haskins (Note: Mark Stevens as John Haskins) recruits his Eastern mob partners to find his son's killers. ^ cast
32	20	"The Chinese Connection"	Bruce Bilson	George F. Slavin	February 28, 1976	032
Lt. Eddie Chew (Note: James Shigeta as Lt. Eddie Chew) is assigned to aid Olympic SWAT when an elderly shop owner is beaten by an undocumented Chinese immigrant working as a shakedown man for Ronald Parker; (Note: Joel Fabiani as Ronald Parker) Parker is the Caucasian leader of what appears to be an all-Asian crime syndicate engaged in a protection ring. Hondo begins to doubt Chew's integrity when it becomes obvious that the Chinatown criminals are being given secrets of his investigation. ^ cast
33	21	"Dragons and Owls"	Bernard McEveety	Bob Mitchell and Esther Mitchell	March 6, 1976	029
Olympic SWAT pursue a group of men who are terrorizing the entire area by committing a series of rapes. The only clues are a religious medal found at one of the abduction scenes and a Biblical quotation overheard by one of the victims. ^ cast
34	22	"Any Second Now"	Nicholas Colasanto	Edward J. Lakso	March 13, 1976	033
A group of militants take over a radio station and demand their jailed leader be released or they will blow up the station, along with their three hostages. ^ cast
35	23	"Soldier on the Hill"	Bernard McEveety	Bob Mitchell and Esther Mitchell	March 20, 1976	031
A mentally unstable veteran who has escaped from a psychiatric hospital is touring a movie studio, when he suddenly thinks he is back fighting in Vietnam. He takes two people hostage, leaving Olympic SWAT with the task of disarming him. ^ cast
36	24	"Dangerous Memories"	Richard Benedict	Robert Hamner	March 27, 1976	034
Admid newspaper stories about a potential police strike, S.W.A.T. is called to the scene of a hostage crisis by a patrol sergeant after Jim Simon and Frank Ryan take a man and woman hostage inside a theater. Lietenant Hondo is shot and falls from the theater fly system and fights for his life during a lengthy brain surgery. While waiting at the hospital for word from Dr. Arnold Durson, (Note: Phillip Pine as Dr. Arnold Durson) Deacon, Street, Luca, and T.J. reminisce about their best moments with the Lieutenant (in retrospective flashbacks to previous episodes, including, "The Killing Ground", "Death Carrier", and "Death Score"). ^ cast
37	25	"Officer Luca, You're Dead"	Bernard McEveety	John Tomerlin	April 3, 1976	035
Luca is charged with manslaughter after he is forced to kill a man who was holding his own wife hostage at gunpoint. ^ cast

== Notes ==
- The opening sequence of the second-season episode "Terror Ship" re-used footage from the beginning of the first-season episode "Pressure Cooker."
- The second-season episode "Deadly Weapons" similarly used re-edited footage taken from the first-season finale, "Sole Survivor."
