= List of Barnaby Jones episodes =

This is a list of all episodes of the CBS television series Barnaby Jones.

== Series overview ==
The first season was released on DVD by Paramount Home Video. VEI released Barnaby Jones—The Complete Collection on DVD on December 15, 2015.

Season	Episodes	Originally released	
Season	Episodes	First released	Last released
1	13	January 28, 1973	May 6, 1973
2	24	September 16, 1973	March 31, 1974
3	24	September 10, 1974	April 15, 1975
4	24	September 19, 1975	March 18, 1976
5	24	October 7, 1976	May 19, 1977
6	22	September 15, 1977	March 2, 1978
7	25	September 21, 1978	April 19, 1979
8	22	September 20, 1979	April 3, 1980

== Episodes ==
=== Season 1 (1973) ===
No. overall	No. in season	Title	Directed by	Written by	Original release date	Prod. code
1	1	"Requiem for a Son"	Walter Grauman	S : Adrian Samish; T : Edward Hume	January 28, 1973	9701
2	2	"To Catch a Dead Man"	William Hale	Ben Masselink	February 4, 1973	9702
3	3	"Sunday: Doomsday"	Michael Caffey	Mort Fine & David Friedkin	February 25, 1973	9705
4	4	"The Murdering Class"	Ralph Senensky	Robert Sherman	March 4, 1973	9704
5	5	"Perchance to Kill"	Walter Grauman	Robert Dennis	March 11, 1973	9706
6	6	"The Loose Connection"	Virgil W. Vogel	Edward J. Lakso	March 18, 1973	9707
7	7	"Murder in the Doll's House"	Lawrence Dobkin	Ben Masselink	March 25, 1973	9708
8	8	"Sing a Song of Murder"	Virgil W. Vogel	Martin Roth & Lou Shaw	April 1, 1973	9709
9	9	"See Some Evil...Do Some Evil"	Lawrence Dobkin	George F. Slavin	April 8, 1973	9710
10	10	"Murder-Go-Round"	Marc Daniels	Steve Fisher	April 15, 1973	9703
11	11	"To Denise, with Love and Murder"	Ralph Senensky	Robert C. Dennis	April 22, 1973	9711
12	12	"A Little Glory, A Little Death"	Robert Day	Shirl Hendryx	April 29, 1973	9712
13	13	"Twenty Million Alibis"	Michael Caffey	Robert Hamner	May 6, 1973	9713

=== Season 2 (1973–74) ===
No. overall	No. in season	Title	Directed by	Written by	Original release date	Prod. code
14	1	"Blind Terror"	Walter Grauman	Robert Malcolm Young	September 16, 1973	9754
15	2	"Death Leap"	Seymour Robbie	Benjamin Masselink	September 23, 1973	9752
16	3	"Echo of a Murder"	Walter Grauman	Calvin Clements, Jr.	September 30, 1973	9751
17	4	"Day of the Viper"	Walter Grauman	Barry Oringer	October 7, 1973	9755
18	5	"Trial Run for Death"	Lawrence Dobkin	Robert W. Lenski	October 14, 1973	9753
19	6	"Catch Me If You Can"	Walter Grauman	George Schenck	October 21, 1973	9757
20	7	"Divorce - Murderer's Style"	Lawrence Dobkin	Robert Heverly	October 28, 1973	9756
21	8	"The Deadly Prize"	Michael Caffey	B.W. Sandefur	November 4, 1973	9758
22	9	"Stand-In for Death"	Walter Grauman	Robert W. Lenski	November 11, 1973	9759
23	10	"The Black Art of Dying"	Walter Grauman	Mark Weingart	November 25, 1973	9761
24	11	"The Killing Defense"	Michael Caffey	Dick Nelson	December 2, 1973	9760
25	12	"Fatal Flight"	Michael Caffey	Calvin Clements, Jr.	December 9, 1973	9762
26	13	"Secret of the Dunes"	Alf Kjellin	B.W. Sandefur	December 16, 1973	9763
27	14	"Venus as in Flytrap"	Corey Allen	S : Jackson Gillis; S/T : Robert Heverly	January 6, 1974	9764
28	15	"The Deadly Jinx"	Robert Douglas	Robert W. Lenski	January 13, 1974	9765
29	16	"The Platinum Connection"	Seymour Robbie	Calvin Clements, Jr.	January 20, 1974	9766
30	17	"Programmed for Killing"	Marc Daniels	B.W. Sandefur	January 27, 1974	9767
31	18	"A Gold Record for Murder"	George McCowan	Larry Brody	February 10, 1974	9768
32	19	"Friends Till Death"	Russ Mayberry	Robert Heverly	February 17, 1974	9769
33	20	"Rendezvous with Terror"	Seymour Robbie	Calvin Clements, Jr.	February 24, 1974	9770
34	21	"Dark Legacy"	Gene Nelson	Robert W. Lenski	March 3, 1974	9771
35	22	"Woman in the Shadows"	Walter Doniger	B.W. Sandefur	March 10, 1974	9772
36	23	"Image in a Cracked Mirror"	William Hale	Gerald Sanford	March 24, 1974	9773
37	24	"Foul Play"	Walter Grauman	S : Larry Brody; T : Calvin Clements	March 31, 1974	9774

=== Season 3 (1974–75) ===
No. overall	No. in season	Title	Directed by	Written by	Original release date
38	1	"A Gathering of Thieves"	Walter Grauman	Robert W. Lenski	September 10, 1974
39	2	"Dead Man's Run"	Walter Grauman	Calvin Clements, Jr.	September 17, 1974
40	3	"The Challenge"	Walter Grauman	Larry Brody	September 24, 1974
41	4	"Conspiracy of Terror"	Lawrence Dobkin	B.W. Sandefur	October 1, 1974
42	5	"Odd Man Loses"	Walter Grauman	Joel Murcott	October 8, 1974
43	6	"Forfeit by Death"	Leslie H. Martinson	Robert Sherman	October 15, 1974
44	7	"Blueprint for a Caper"	Corey Allen	Gerald Sanford	October 29, 1974
45	8	"Mystery Cycle"	William Wiard	Calvin Clements, Jr.	November 12, 1974
46	9	"Dark Homecoming"	William Wiard	Benjamin Masselink	November 19, 1974
47	10	"Time to Kill"	Leslie H. Martinson	Larry Alexander	November 26, 1974
48	11	"Death on Deposit"	Robert Douglas	Jack B. Sowards	December 3, 1974
49	12	"Web of Deceit"	Seymour Robbie	Robert Pirosh	December 10, 1974
50	13	"The Last Contract"	Seymour Robbie	Robert Heverly	December 31, 1974
51	14	"Trap Play"	Leslie H. Martinson	Barry Oringer	January 7, 1975
52	15	"Murder Once Removed"	Ralph Senensky	Robert W. Lenski	January 21, 1975
53	16	"Counterfall"	Alf Kjellin	Joel Murcott	February 4, 1975
54	17	"Dangerous Summer"	Corey Allen	B.W. Sandefur	February 11, 1975
55	18	"Image of Evil"	Leo Penn	Larry Brody	February 18, 1975
56	19	"Fantasy of Fear"	Leo Penn	Robert W. Lenski	February 25, 1975
57	20	"Doomed Alibi"	Richard C. Bennett	Martin Roth	March 11, 1975
58	21	"The Deadlier Species"	Leslie H. Martinson	Lou Shaw	March 18, 1975
59	22	"Poisoned Pigeon"	Richard C. Bennett	Skip Webster	March 25, 1975
60	23	"Jeopardy for Two"	Michael Caffey	Carey Wilber	April 1, 1975
61	24	"Bond of Fear"	Leslie H. Martinson	Robert Sherman	April 15, 1975

=== Season 4 (1975–76) ===
No. overall	No. in season	Title	Directed by	Written by	Original release date
62	1	"The Deadly Conspiracy: Part 2"	Michael Caffey	Stephen Kandel	September 19, 1975
63	2	"Theater of Fear"	Walter Grauman	Robert W. Lenski	September 26, 1975
64	3	"The Orchid Killer"	Walter Grauman	Michael Fisher	October 3, 1975
65	4	"The Price of Terror"	Walter Grauman	William Keys	October 10, 1975
66	5	"Honeymoon with Death"	Michael Caffey	Larry Alexander	October 17, 1975
67	6	"The Alpha-Bravo War"	Michael Caffey	S : Barry Oringer; T : Calvin Clements, Jr.	October 24, 1975
68	7	"Flight to Danger"	Michael Caffey	Joel Murcott	October 31, 1975
69	8	"Double Vengeance"	Michael Caffey	Robert Sherman	November 7, 1975
70	9	"Fatal Witness"	Walter Grauman	Calvin Clements, Jr.	November 14, 1975
71	10	"Beware the Dog"	Walter Grauman	Michael Fisher	November 21, 1975
72	11	"Blood Relations"	Walter Grauman	Dick Nelson	November 28, 1975
73	12	"A Taste for Murder"	Walter Grauman	Robert W. Lenski	December 4, 1975
74	13	"Final Burial"	Michael Caffey	S : Gerald Sanford; T : Robert Pirosh	December 11, 1975
75	14	"Portrait of Evil"	Michael Caffey	Robert Sherman	December 18, 1975
76	15	"Dead Heat"	Walter Grauman	Larry Alexander	January 1, 1976
77	16	"The Lonely Victims"	Michael Caffey	Worley Thorne	January 8, 1976
78	17	"Hostage"	Mel Damski	Gerald Sanford	January 15, 1976
79	18	"Silent Vendetta"	Walter Grauman	William Keys	January 29, 1976
80	19	"Shadow of Guilt"	Chris Robinson	Terrance A. Sweeney, S.J.	February 5, 1976
81	20	"Deadly Reunion"	Walter Grauman	Dick Nelson	February 12, 1976
82	21	"Dangerous Gambit"	Ernest Pintoff	Robert Sherman	February 26, 1976
83	22	"Wipeout"	Kenneth C. Gilbert	Michael Fisher	March 4, 1976
84	23	"The Eyes of Terror"	Allen Reisner	Larry Alexander	March 11, 1976
85	24	"The Stalking Horse"	Alf Kjellin	Robert W. Lenski	March 18, 1976

=== Season 5 (1976–77) ===
No. overall	No. in season	Title	Directed by	Written by	Original release date
86	1	"Blood Vengeance"	Walter Grauman	Dick Nelson	October 7, 1976
87	2	"Deadline for Dying"	Walter Grauman	Robert W. Lenski	October 14, 1976
88	3	"Sins of Thy Father"	Walter Grauman	Gerald Sanford	October 21, 1976
89	4	"The Fatal Dive"	Walter Grauman	Paul Robert Coyle	October 28, 1976
90	5	"Final Ransom"	Mel Damski	Mann Rubin	November 11, 1976
91	6	"Band of Evil"	Walter Grauman	Robert W. Lenski	November 18, 1976
92	7	"Voice in the Night"	Leslie H. Martinson	Robert Sherman	December 2, 1976
93	8	"The Bounty Hunter"	Alf Kjellin	William Keys	December 16, 1976
94	9	"Renegade's Child"	Harry Falk	Larry Alexander	December 23, 1976
95	10	"Fraternity of Thieves"	Mel Damski	Gerald Sanford	December 30, 1976
96	11	"Sister of Death"	Michael Caffey	Bethel Leslie & Gerry Day	January 6, 1977
97	12	"The Deadly Charade"	Michael Caffey	Calvin Clements, Jr.	January 13, 1977
98	13	"Testament of Power"	Alf Kjellin	Stanley Roberts	January 20, 1977
99	14	"Copy-Cat Killing"	Leslie H. Martinson	Larry Forrester	January 27, 1977
100	15	"A Simple Case of Terror"	Michael Caffey	Calvin Clements, Jr.	February 3, 1977
101	16	"The Marathon Murders"	Walter Grauman	Worley Thorne	February 17, 1977
102	17	"Duet for Dying"	Leo Penn	Gerald Sanford	February 24, 1977
103	18	"Circle of Treachery"	Walter Grauman	Robert Sherman	March 3, 1977
104	19	"Anatomy of Fear"	Walter Grauman	Gerald Sanford	March 17, 1977
105	20	"The Killer on Campus"	Leo Penn	Dick Nelson	March 24, 1977
106	21	"The Deadly Valentine"	Walter Grauman	Mann Rubin	March 31, 1977
107	22	"Duet for Danger"	Leslie H. Martinson	Gerald Sanford	May 5, 1977
108	23	"The Inside Man"	Guerdon Trueblood	Paul Robert Coyle	May 12, 1977
109	24	"Run Away to Terror"	Kenneth Gilbert	Gerald Sanford	May 19, 1977

=== Season 6 (1977–78) ===
No. overall	No. in season	Title	Directed by	Written by	Original release date
110	1	"Death Beat"	Michael Caffey	Larry Alexander	September 15, 1977
111	2	"The Mercenaries"	Walter Grauman	Robert Janes	September 22, 1977
112	3	"The Wife Beater"	Walter Grauman	Gerald Sanford	September 29, 1977
113	4	"Yesterday's Terror"	Kenneth Gilbert	Robert Heverly	October 13, 1977
114	5	"The Damocles Gun"	Leo Penn	Gerald Sanford	October 20, 1977
115	6	"Gang War"	Leslie H. Martinson	Jack V. Fogarty	October 27, 1977
116	7	"Daughter of Evil"	Walter Grauman	Dick Nelson	November 3, 1977
117	8	"The Captives"	Walter Grauman	Robert Sherman	November 10, 1977
118	9	"The Reincarnation"	Walter Grauman	Michael Michaelian	November 17, 1977
119	10	"Shadow of Fear"	Kenneth Gilbert	Margaret Armen	November 24, 1977
120	11	"The Devil's Handmaiden"	Kenneth Gilbert	S : Robert C. Dennis; T : Mann Rubin	December 1, 1977
121	12	"Prisoner of Deceit"	Leo Penn	Marc Brandell	December 15, 1977
122	13	"Deadly Homecoming"	Joseph Manduke	Arthur Bernard Lewis	December 22, 1977
123	14	"Child of Danger"	Michael Caffey	Mann Rubin	December 29, 1977
124	15	"The Scapegoat"	Walter Grauman	William Keys	January 5, 1978
125	16	"A Ransom in Diamonds"	Walter Grauman	Gerald Sanford	January 12, 1978
126	17	"Prime Target"	Michael Preece	Robert Janes	January 19, 1978
127 128	18 19	"Final Judgment"	Walter Grauman	Gerald Sanford	January 26, 1978
129	20	"Uninvited Peril"	Robert Sherman	Robert Sherman	February 2, 1978
130	21	"Terror on a Quiet Afternoon"	Walter Grauman	Jack V. Fogarty	February 9, 1978
131	22	"The Coronado Triangle"	Walter Grauman	S : Jon Christiansen & Brigitt Christiansen; T : Norman Jolley	March 2, 1978

=== Season 7 (1978–79) ===
No. overall	No. in season	Title	Directed by	Written by	Original release date
132	1	"Blind Jeopardy"	Walter Grauman	William Keys	September 21, 1978
133	2	"A Dangerous Affair"	Dick Lowry	Dick Nelson	September 28, 1978
134	3	"Deadly Sanctuary"	Leo Penn	Mann Rubin	October 12, 1978
135	4	"Hitch-Hike to Terror"	Walter Grauman	S : Jeff Kanter; T : Mann Rubin	October 19, 1978
136	5	"Nest of Scorpions"	Kenneth Gilbert	Norman Jolley	October 26, 1978
137	6	"Death of a Friendship"	Bruce Kessler	Robert E. Swanson	November 9, 1978
138	7	"A Frame for Murder"	Leo Penn	Dallas L. Barnes	November 16, 1978
139	8	"Stages of Fear"	Leo Penn	Marc Brandell	November 23, 1978
140	9	"Victim of Love"	Walter Grauman	Jack V. Fogarty	November 30, 1978
141	10	"Memory of a Nightmare"	Walter Grauman	Shirley Leeds	December 14, 1978
142	11	"The Picture Pirates"	Kenneth Gilbert	S : Jon Christiansen & Brigitt Christiansen; T : Robert Sherman	December 21, 1978
143	12	"Academy of Evil"	Ray Austin	Margaret Armen and Alf Harris	December 28, 1978
144	13	"The Medium"	Dick Lowry	Gerald Sanford	January 4, 1979
145 146	14 15	"Echo of a Distant Battle"	Walter Grauman	Gerald Sanford	January 11, 1979
147	16	"The Enslaved"	Michael Caffey	Jeff Myrow	January 18, 1979
148	17	"Dance with Death"	Ron Satlof	Larry Alexander	January 25, 1979
149	18	"The Protectors"	Seymour Robbie	Jack V. Fogarty	February 1, 1979
150	19	"Fatal Overture"	Graeme Clifford	Dick Nelson	February 8, 1979
151	20	"Master of Deception"	Kenneth Gilbert	Gerald Sanford	February 22, 1979
152	21	"A Short Happy Life"	John Carter	Robert W. Lenski	March 1, 1979
153	22	"Child of Love, Child of Vengeance: Part 1"	Michael Preece	Robert W. Lenski	March 15, 1979
154	23	"Child of Love, Child of Vengeance: Part 2"	Michael Preece	Robert W. Lenski	March 22, 1979
155	24	"Target for a Wedding"	Robert Sherman	Robert Sherman	April 12, 1979
156	25	"Temptation"	Joseph Manduke	Norman Jolley	April 19, 1979

=== Season 8 (1979–80) ===
No. overall	No. in season	Title	Directed by	Written by	Original release date
157	1	"Man on Fire"	Seymour Robbie	Jack V. Fogarty	September 20, 1979
158 159	2 3	"Nightmare in Hawaii"	Michael Caffey	Robert Sherman	September 27, 1979
160	4	"A Desperate Pursuit"	Seymour Robbie	Norman Jolley	October 11, 1979
161	5	"Design for Madness"	Dennis Donnelly	Dick Nelson	October 18, 1979
162	6	"Girl on the Road"	Kenneth Gilbert	Gerald Sanford	October 25, 1979
163	7	"Indoctrination in Evil"	Leo Penn	Gerald Sanford	November 1, 1979
164	8	"Homecoming for a Dead Man"	Bruce Kessler	Jack B. Sowards	November 8, 1979
165	9	"False Witness"	Winrich Kolbe	Paul Robert Coyle	November 29, 1979
166	10	"School of Terror"	Kenneth Gilbert	William Keys	December 20, 1979
167	11	"Cry for Vengeance"	Allen Baron	Robert I. Holt	December 27, 1979
168	12	"Run to Death"	John Carter	John Donley & Linda Fortney	January 3, 1980
169	13	"The Price of Anger"	Larry Elikann	Albert Aley	January 10, 1980
170	14	"The Killing Point"	Michael Preece	Robert W. Lenski	January 17, 1980
171	15	"Focus on Fear"	Kenneth Gilbert	Jack V. Fogarty	January 31, 1980
172	16	"Murder in the Key of C"	Michael Caffey	Robert I. Holt	February 7, 1980
173	17	"Killer Without a Name"	Kenneth C. Gilbert	David P. Harmon	February 14, 1980
174	18	"Death Is the Punchline"	Dick Lowry	Paul Robert Coyle	February 21, 1980
175	19	"The Final Victim"	Robert Sherman	S : Philip Saltzman; S/T : Robert Sherman	March 6, 1980
176	20	"The Silent Accuser"	Graeme Clifford	Carolyn See & Jackie Joseph	March 13, 1980
177	21	"Deadline for Murder"	Lewis Teague	Larry Alexander	March 27, 1980
178	22	"The Killin' Cousin"	Michael Preece	Norman Jolley	April 3, 1980

== See also ==
- List of Cannon episodes - includes Part 1 of "The Deadly Conspiracy".
