= S.W.A.T. (1975 TV series) =

American television series (1975–1976)

- Genre: Police procedural Action; Crime drama
- Created by: Robert Hamner
- Developed by: Rick Husky
- Starring: Steve Forrest; Robert Urich; Rod Perry; Mark Shera; James Coleman
- Theme music composer: Barry De Vorzon
- Opening theme: "Theme from S.W.A.T."
- Country of origin: United States
- Original language: English
- No. of seasons: 2
- No. of episodes: 37 (list of episodes)

Production
- Executive producers: Aaron Spelling; Leonard Goldberg
- Producer: Robert Hamner
- Cinematography: Tim Southcott
- Camera setup: Single-camera
- Running time: 49–50 minutes
- Production company: Spelling-Goldberg Productions

Original release
- Network: ABC
- Release: February 24, 1975 – April 3, 1976

Related
- S.W.A.T. (2017 TV series)

S.W.A.T. is an American police procedural, action and crime drama television series created by Robert Hamner, developed by Rick Husky and produced by Hamner, Aaron Spelling and Leonard Goldberg under Spelling-Goldberg Productions.

The series aired for two seasons on ABC from February 24, 1975 to April 3, 1976. A spin-off of The Rookies, developed from a two-part pilot aired on February 17, 1975, S.W.A.T. follows a police Special Weapons and Tactics (SWAT) team operating in an unnamed Californian city. The series stars Steve Forrest, Robert Urich, Rod Perry, Mark Shera and James Coleman as the titular team's officers.

S.W.A.T. was filmed in and around Los Angeles. Richard Kelbaugh, a former LAPD Metropolitan Division SWAT officer, served as a technical advisor.

The series' opening theme was composed by Barry De Vorzon; an official rearrangement by Rhythm Heritage reached number one on the Billboard Hot 100 singles chart in the United States on the chart date of February 27, 1976.

S.W.A.T. was popular with audiences, but controversies surrounding its depictions of violence ultimately led to the cancellation of a third season.

S.W.A.T.'s legacy spawned a 2003 film adaptation directed by Clark Johnson for Columbia Pictures, and a 2017 television series reboot developed by Aaron Rahsaan Thomas and Shawn Ryan for CBS, both of the same name. In 2025, a new spinoff and sequel (titled S.W.A.T. Exiles) was announced after the 2017 series, which was cancelled after eight seasons. It will premiere on Starz on September 25, 2026.

== Synopsis ==
S.W.A.T. is set in the same fictional universe as The Rookies, in an unnamed Californian metropolis loosely based on Los Angeles, and follows the newly-established SWAT unit of the Western California Police Department (WCPD). The series specifically follows Olympic SWAT, a five-man SWAT team assigned to Olympic Precinct, headquartered in the precinct's basement. Issued equipment ranging from weapons like the M16 rifle, Winchester Model 70, and Federal Riot Gun, to crucial tools like grappling hooks, tear gas, and bulletproof vests, SWAT is trained and equipped to resolve situations regular police units cannot, such as standoffs, crisis negotiation, hostage-takings, robberies, active shooters, assassinations, bomb threats, organized crime, and terrorism.

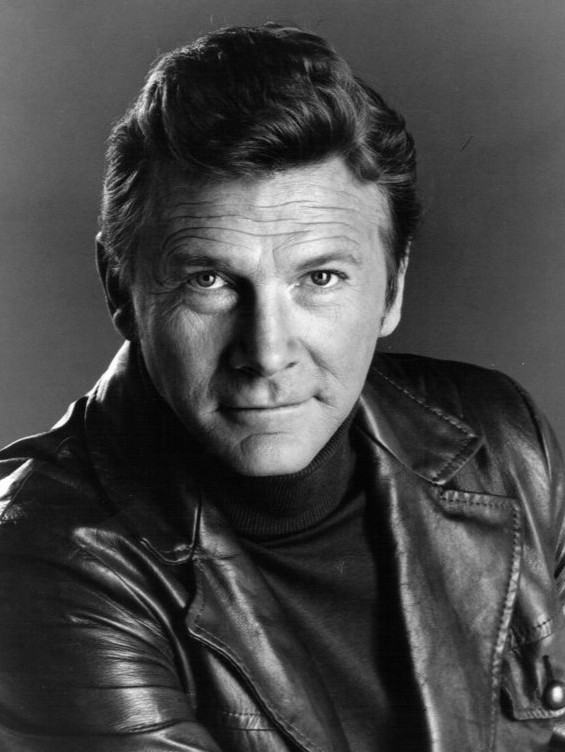
Steve Forrest

Heading Olympic Metro SWAT is Lieutenant Daniel "Hondo" Harrelson, the squad leader and the series' protagonist, assisted by Sergeant David "Deacon" Kay, the team's chaplain and sole African-American officer. Under Harrelson and Kay's command are Jim Street, a former patrol officer who joins SWAT after his partner is killed by an anti-police gang; Dominic Luca, a single-but-seeking Italian-American who joins SWAT from the Narcotics Division and often serves as comic relief; and Travis Joseph "T.J." McCabe, the team's sniper who is selected for SWAT for his natural marksmanship skills. Their SWAT vehicle and mobile command center, an early-1970s International Harvester Metro Van fitted with an armory and police radio, is driven by "Sam", an unseen, mostly silent character played by an uncredited actor.

The personal lives of the SWAT officers, particularly Harrelson, were focal points of numerous episodes; Harrelson's wife Betty and their two young sons often appeared as major characters and plot points. Police officials and friends of the team were also recurring characters, such as Chief Edward Roman, the WCPD's chief of police, and Hilda, a sandwich vendor known for selling cheap sandwiches made of leftovers to Olympic Precinct.

== Cast ==
=== Main ===
- Steve Forrest as Lt. Daniel "Hondo" Harrelson
- Robert Urich as Officer Jim Street
- Rod Perry as Sgt. David "Deacon" Kay
- Mark Shera as Officer Dominic Luca
- James Coleman as Officer Travis Joseph "T.J." McCabe

=== Recurring ===
- Ellen Weston as Betty Harrelson
- Rose Marie as Hilda
- Richard O'Brien as Chief Edward Roman

=== Notable guest stars ===
"The Killing Ground" (S1.E1)
- Kenneth Tobey
- Jesse Vint
- Geoffrey Lewis
- Annette O'Toole
- William Lucking
"A Coven of Killers" (S1.E2)
- Sal Mineo
- Ellen Weston
- William Windom
- James Keach
"Death Carrier" (S1.E3)
- Ronne Troup
- John Bleifer
- David Sheiner
- Joanna Barnes
"Pressure Cooker" (S1.E4)
- Darleen Carr
- Logan Ramsey
- Jean Allison
- Gary Vinson
"Hit Men" (S1.E5)
- Jess Walton
- Walter Brooke
- Paul Stevens
- Robert Loggia.
"Jungle War" (S1.E6)
- Cameron Mitchell
- Anitra Ford
- Frances Reid
- Eric Server
"Death Score" (S1.E7)
- Robert Webber
- Michael Warren
- Paul Cavonis
- Corinne Camacho
- Berlinda Tolbert
- Stu Nahan
- Anthony Eisley
"The Bravo Enigma" (S1.E8)
- Christopher George
- John Lupton
- Murray Matheson
- Rose Marie
- Robert Ellenstein
- Austin Stoker
"The Steel-Plated Security Blanket" (S1.E9)
- Michael Conrad
- Timothy Brown
- Lara Parker
- Farrah Fawcett
- Loni Anderson
"Omega One" (S1.E10)
- Sam Jaffe
- Kip Niven
- James Griffith
- Kerrigan Mahan
- Patricia Stich
"Blind Man's Bluff" (S1.E11)
- Ellen Weston
- Rose Marie
- Frank Aletter
- Andrew Rubin
"Sole Survivor" (S1.E12)
- Simon Oakland
- Jim McMullan
- Hal Williams
- George DiCenzo
- Ben Wright
- Ike Eisenmann
"Deadly Tide" (S2.E1-2)
- Christopher George
- Sal Mineo
- Loni Anderson
- Phil Silvers
- Susan Dey
- Lesley Ann Warren
- Don Stroud
"Kill S.W.A.T." (S2.E3)
- Ben Frank
- Diana Hyland
- David Canary
"Dealers in Death" (S2.E4)
- Rex Holman
- John Vernon
- Sean McClory
"Time Bomb" (S2.E5)
- William Smith
- Heather Menzies
- Robert Donner
- Paul Bryar
"The Vendetta" (S2.E6)
- Paul Mantee as Mel Lang
- Aldo Ray as Ralph Costa
- Scott Newman
- Susan Sullivan
- John Bennett Perry
"Criss-Cross" (S2.E7)
- Carl Betz as U.S. Senator Greg Colby
- Carl Weathers
- Neva Patterson
- Jack Hogan
"Vigilante" (S2.E8)
- Harris Yulin as Paul Julian
- Janet Margolin
- Jimmy McNichol
"Courthouse" (S2.E9)
- H. M. Wynant as Jason Bridges
- Deidre Hall
- Anitra Ford
- Joe Turkel
- Brad Dexter
- Elisha Cook Jr.
"Ordeal" (S2.E10)
- Frank Gorshin as Johnny Rizi
- John Brascia
- Richard Davalos
"Strike Force" (S2.E11)
- John Dehner as General James Woodward
- John Ericson
- John Brascia
- Ray Middleton
- Anjanette Comer
"The Swinger" (S2.E12)
- Ed Gilbert as John Stevens
- Al Ruscio
- Ric Carrott
- Tony Young
"Terror Ship" (S2.E13)
- Diana Muldaur
- Don Keefer
- Paul Carr
- Johnny Haymer
- Frank Maxwell
- Milt Kogan
"Murder by Fire" (S2.E14)
- Peter Breck as Marco
- Anthony James
- Ed Peck
- Luke Askew
- Corinne Camacho
- Frank Parker
"Silent Night, Deadly Night" (S2.E15)
- Anne Francis as Doris Wainwright Bristol
- Frank Campanella as Joe DeLeon
- Michael Callan as Frank Malloy
- Rose Marie as Hilda
- Elizabeth Baur
- Alan Oppenheimer
"The Running Man" (S2.E16-17)
- Stuart Whitman as David Neal
- James Darren
- David Opatoshu
- John Lupton
- Linda Marsh
- Bruce Glover
- Forrest Tucker
- Donna Mills
- Leslie Nielsen
"Lessons in Fear" (S2.E18)
- Elinor Donahue
- Don Chastain
"Deadly Weapons" (S2.E19)
- Mark Stevens as John Haskins
- Burt Douglas
- Steven Keats
"The Chinese Connection" (S2.E20)
- James Shigeta as Lt. Eddie Chew
- Joel Fabiani as Ronald Parker
- Beulah Quo
- Chao-Li Chi
- James Hong
"Dragons and Owls" (S2.E21)
- Tom Skerritt
- Virginia Gregg
- Karen Carlson
- Dennis Fimple
"Any Second Now" (S2.E22)
- Charles Aidman
- Lynne Moody
- Bert Remsen
- Ji-Tu Cumbuka
- Andrew Robinson
"Soldier on the Hill" (S2.E23)
- Mark Slade
- Marianna Hill
- Ivor Francis
- Bennye Gatteys
"Dangerous Memories" (S2.E24)
- Phillip Pine
"Officer Luca, You're Dead" (S2.E25)
- Sandra Kerns
- Mitzi Hoag
- Judson Pratt
- Laurence Haddon

== Episodes ==
Season	Episodes	First aired	Last aired
1	12	February 24, 1975	May 26, 1975
2	25	September 13, 1975	April 3, 1976

== Broadcast and syndication ==
On September 11, 2011, S.W.A.T. began airing on Antenna TV for a period of time before it became a full sitcom network and in Australia on 7mate in 2013. In May 2015, it began airing on getTV until its removal.

The series occasionally airs in weekend binges on the OTA network Decades channel (now Catchy Comedy).

Episodes also appeared on The Roku Channel and Tubi for an undetermined length of time. Currently, the show airs on MeTV+ Saturdays at 7:00pm EST/4:00pm PST.

Starting February 1, 2026, FETV began airing the show starting with a "Suit Up for S. W. A. T. Kickoff Marathon" that ran from 9:00 AM ET/8:00 AM CT to 3:00 PM ET/2:00 PM CT on February 1 with an episode airing on Saturday and Sunday nights at 6:50 PM ET/5:50 PM CT.

== Home media ==
=== DVD ===
The first season of S.W.A.T. was released on DVD on June 3, 2003 to tie-in with the release of the feature film. Season Two's episode "Time Bomb" was actually produced for Season One and, as such, "Time Bomb" is Episode 8 on the Season One DVD set. The Season One DVD set has a total of 16 episodes.

On February 10, 2012, it was announced that Shout! Factory had acquired the rights to the series; they subsequently released the second and final season on DVD on May 22, 2012.

On January 16, 2018, Mill Creek Entertainment released S.W.A.T.: The Complete Series on DVD in Region 1.

=== Streaming ===
As of March 2009, the show can be purchased on iTunes.

== Reception ==
The violent television series premiered at a time when violence on television began to become a subject of controversy, and the actual LAPD Metropolitan Division on which the fictional SWAT team had been modeled was harshly critical of its depiction of such teams.

== Franchise ==
=== Film adaptation ===
A film version of the series, S.W.A.T., was released in 2003 starring Colin Farrell and Samuel L. Jackson. Steve Forrest has a cameo role as a police truck driver and Rod Perry (the original TV series' "Deacon" Kay) plays the father of LL Cool J's character Deacon "Deke" Kaye.

In 2011 and 2017, two direct-to-DVD sequels titled S.W.A.T.: Firefight and S.W.A.T.: Under Siege were released; they bore little connection to the TV series, the 2003 film, or to each other.

=== Television series reboot ===
On May 12, 2017, a new version of S.W.A.T. starring Shemar Moore as Hondo was ordered to series by CBS. The new series premiered on November 2, 2017. This reboot series was far more successful with an eight season run and over 163 episodes. In 2025, a new spinoff and sequel (titled S.W.A.T. Exiles) was announced after the series was cancelled.

== Other media ==
S.W.A.T. has inspired other media such as board and video games. In 1976, Milton Bradley published The S.W.A.T. Game, a board game based upon the television series; the objective for players is to load a team into a S.W.A.T. van to chase and apprehend suspects.
