= List of Cannon episodes =

Cannon is an American detective television series broadcast on CBS from 1971 to 1976, starring William Conrad as a private detective.

== Series overview ==
Cannon consists of a 2-hour pilot, five seasons of episodes, and a 2-hour TV-movie.

Season	Episodes	Originally released		Rank	Rating
Season	Episodes	First released	Last released	Rank	Rating
Pilot		March 26, 1971		—N/a	—N/a
1	24	September 14, 1971	March 14, 1972	28	19.8 (Note: Tied with Room 222)
2	24	September 13, 1972	March 21, 1973	14	22.4
3	25	September 12, 1973	March 20, 1974	9	23.1 (Note: Tied with The Mary Tyler Moore Show)
4	24	September 11, 1974	April 2, 1975	20	21.6 (Note: Tied with Mannix)
5	25	September 10, 1975	March 3, 1976	39	—N/a (Note: Tied with Hawaii Five-0)
Television film		November 1, 1980		—N/a	—N/a

== Episodes ==
=== Pilot (1971) ===
Title	Directed by	Written by	Original release date
"Cannon"	George McCowan	Edward Hume, Charles Williams (uncredited)	March 26, 1971
Private detective Frank Cannon investigates the murder of a war-buddy to clear the man's wife (Vera Miles) of suspicion in his death and gets entangled in small-town corruption and incompetent law enforcement. Based on the novel Talk of the Town by Charles Williams.

=== Season 1 (1971–72) ===
No. overall	No. in season	Title	Directed by	Written by	Original release date
1	1	"The Salinas Jackpot"	George McCowan	Ken Trevey	September 14, 1971
2	2	"Death Chain"	Jerry Jameson	Paul Playdon & David Moessinger	September 21, 1971
3	3	"Call Unicorn"	Allen Reisner	S : E. Arthur Kean; T : David Moessinger & Paul Playdon	September 28, 1971
4	4	"Country Blues"	Allen Reisner	Ronald Austin & James D. Buchanan	October 5, 1971
5	5	"Scream of Silence"	Jerry Jameson	Robert Collins	October 12, 1971
6	6	"Fool's Gold"	Don Medford	S : Bill Stratton; T : Edward Hume	October 19, 1971
7	7	"Girl in the Electric Coffin"	Jerry Jameson	Robert Malcolm Young	October 26, 1971
8	8	"Dead Pigeon"	Don Taylor	S : George Kirgo; S/T : James D. Buchanan & Ronald Austin	November 9, 1971
9	9	"A Lonely Place to Die"	William Hale	Jack Turley	November 16, 1971
10	10	"No Pockets in a Shroud"	William Hale	Ken Pettus	November 23, 1971
11	11	"Stone, Cold Dead"	Seymour Robbie	Paul Playdon & David Moessinger	November 30, 1971
12	12	"Death Is a Double-Cross"	Richard Donner	T : Edward Hume & George Eckstein	December 7, 1971
13	13	"The Nowhere Man"	George McCowan	Michael Gleason	December 14, 1971
14	14	"Flight Plan"	Richard Donner	Robert C. Dennis	December 28, 1971
15	15	"Devil's Playground"	Marvin Chomsky	Ken Trevey	January 4, 1972
16	16	"Treasure of San Ignacio"	Allen Reisner	T : Paul Playdon; S/T : Bill S. Ballinger	January 11, 1972
17	17	"Blood on the Vine"	George McCowan	S : Ken Pettus; T : Stephen Kandel	January 18, 1972
18	18	"To Kill a Guinea Pig"	Allen Reisner	Hal Sitowitz	February 1, 1972
19	19	"The Island Caper"	Lewis Allen	George Bellak	February 8, 1972
20	20	"A Deadly Quiet Town"	Seymour Robbie	Robert W. Lenski	February 15, 1972
21	21	"A Flight of Hawks"	Charles S. Dubin	Stephen Kandel	February 22, 1972
22	22	"The Torch"	Michael O'Herlihy	James D. Buchanan & Ronald Austin	February 29, 1972
23	23	"Cain's Mark"	Don Taylor	George Bellak	March 7, 1972
24	24	"Murder by Moonlight"	Seymour Robbie	Karl Tunberg	March 14, 1972

=== Season 2 (1972–73) ===
No. overall	No. in season	Title	Directed by	Written by	Original release date
25	1	"Bad Cats and Sudden Death"	Philip Leacock	Robert Lewin	September 13, 1972
26	2	"Sky Above, Death Below"	George McCowan	Hal Sitowitz	September 20, 1972
27	3	"Bitter Legion"	Michael O'Herlihy	George Bellak	September 27, 1972
28	4	"That Was No Lady"	George McCowan	Dick Nelson	October 4, 1972
29	5	"Stakeout"	Leo Penn	Harold Gast	October 11, 1972
30	6	"The Predators"	George McCowan	Arthur Heinemann	October 18, 1972
31	7	"A Long Way Down"	George McCowan	Stephen Kandel	October 25, 1972
32	8	"The Rip Off"	George McCowan	Douglas Day Stewart	November 1, 1972
33	9	"Child of Fear"	David Lowell Rich	Robert W. Lenski	November 15, 1972
34	10	"The Shadow Man"	Robert Douglas	Robert Lewin	November 22, 1972
35	11	"Hear No Evil"	Charles S. Dubin	Robert W. Lenski	November 29, 1972
36	12	"The Endangered Species"	Robert Douglas	Del Reisman	December 13, 1972
37	13	"Nobody Beats the House"	Herbert Hirschman	Meyer Dolinsky	December 20, 1972
38	14	"Hard Rock Roller Coaster"	Charles S. Dubin	S : Bill S. Ballinger; T : Meyer Dolinsky	January 3, 1973
39	15	"The Dead Samaritan"	Jerry Jameson	S : Robert Van Scoyk; T : Stephen Kandel	January 10, 1973
40	16	"Death of a Stone Seahorse"	William Wiard	Anthony Lawrence	January 17, 1973
41	17	"Moving Target"	Lawrence Dobkin	Worley Thorne	January 31, 1973
42	18	"Murder for Murder"	Herschel Daugherty	Arthur Heinemann	February 7, 1973
43	19	"To Ride a Tiger"	Virgil W. Vogel	Robert W. Lenski	February 14, 1973
44	20	"Prisoners"	Charles S. Dubin	Robert Lewin	February 21, 1973
45	21	"The Seventh Grave"	John Badham	E. Arthur Kean	February 28, 1973
46	22	"Catch Me If You Can"	William Hale	Douglas Day Stewart	March 7, 1973
47	23	"Press Pass to the Slammer"	Leo Penn	Meyer Dolinsky	March 14, 1973
48	24	"Deadly Heritage"	Seymour Robbie	Robert Lewin	March 21, 1973

=== Season 3 (1973–74) ===
No. overall	No. in season	Title	Directed by	Written by	Original release date
49 50	1 2	"He Who Digs a Grave"	Richard Donner	T : Stephen Kandel	September 12, 1973
51	3	"Memo from a Dead Man"	Richard Donner	Robert C. Dennis	September 19, 1973
52	4	"Hounds of Hell"	Lawrence Dobkin	Jack Turley	September 26, 1973
53	5	"Target in the Mirror"	Gene Nelson	Robert Blees	October 3, 1973
54	6	"Murder by Proxy"	Robert Douglas	Robert W. Lenski	October 10, 1973
55	7	"Night Flight to Murder"	Michael Caffey	Carey Wilber	October 17, 1973
56	8	"Come Watch Me Die"	George McCowan	Herb Meadow	October 24, 1973
57	9	"The Perfect Alibi"	Robert Douglas	Ray Brenner & Jack Guss	October 31, 1973
58	10	"Dead Lady's Tears"	Virgil W. Vogel	Steve Fisher	November 7, 1973
59	11	"The Limping Man"	Michael Caffey	Shirl Hendryx	November 14, 1973
60	12	"Trial by Terror"	Robert Douglas	Larry Brody	November 21, 1973
61	13	"Murder by the Numbers"	George McCowan	S : Michael McTaggart; T : Robert Blees	November 28, 1973
62	14	"Valley of the Damned"	Lawrence Dobkin	Carey Wilber	December 5, 1973
63	15	"A Well-Remembered Terror"	Seymour Robbie	Robert I. Holt	December 12, 1973
64	16	"Arena of Fear"	Marc Daniels	Collier Young & Meyer Dolinsky	December 19, 1973
65	17	"Photo Finish"	George McCowan	John Hawkins	January 2, 1974
66	18	"Duel in the Desert"	William Wiard	Robert C. Dennis	January 16, 1974
67	19	"Where's Jennifer?"	Gene Nelson	Robert White & Phyllis White	January 23, 1974
68	20	"Blood Money"	William Wiard	Stephen Kandel	February 6, 1974
69	21	"Death of a Hunter"	George McCowan	Meyer Dolinsky	February 13, 1974
70	22	"The Cure That Kills"	Seymour Robbie	Worley Thorne	February 20, 1974
71	23	"Bobby Loved Me"	Lawrence Dobkin	Joel Murcott	February 27, 1974
72	24	"Triangle of Terror"	George McCowan	Carey Wilber	March 13, 1974
73	25	"The Stalker"	Lawrence Dobkin	Richard Newhafer	March 20, 1974

=== Season 4 (1974–75) ===
No. overall	No. in season	Title	Directed by	Written by	Original release date
74	1	"Kelly's Song"	William Wiard	S.S. Schweitzer	September 11, 1974
75	2	"The Hit Man"	William Wiard	Robert Heverly	September 18, 1974
76	3	"Voice from the Grave"	William Wiard	Robert Hamner	September 25, 1974
77	4	"Lady in Red"	William Wiard	Max Hodge	October 2, 1974
78	5	"The Deadly Trail"	George McCowan	Calvin Clements	October 16, 1974
79	6	"The Exchange"	George McCowan	Jackson Gillis	October 23, 1974
80	7	"The Avenger"	Corey Allen	Robert Sherman	October 30, 1974
81	8	"A Killing in the Family"	George McCowan	Larry Alexander	November 6, 1974
82	9	"Flashpoint"	William Wiard	Robert Heverly	November 13, 1974
83	10	"The Man Who Couldn't Forget"	George McCowan	Robert I. Holt	November 20, 1974
84	11	"The Sounds of Silence"	George McCowan	T : Anthony Spinner; S/T : Stephen Kandel	December 4, 1974
85	12	"The Prisoner"	William Wiard	Norman Hudis	December 11, 1974
86	13	"Daddy's Little Girl"	Leslie H. Martinson	Larry Alexander	December 18, 1974
87	14	"The Conspirators"	George McCowan	Margaret Armen	January 1, 1975
88	15	"Coffin Corner"	George McCowan	S : Rick Husky; T : Robert I. Holt	January 15, 1975
89	16	"Perfect Fit for a Frame"	William Wiard	Robert Hamner	January 22, 1975
90	17	"Killer on the Hill"	Harry Falk	Carey Wilber	January 29, 1975
91	18	"Missing at FL307"	William Wiard	Carey Wilber	February 5, 1975
92	19	"The Set Up"	George McCowan	Robert Sherman	February 12, 1975
93	20	"The Investigator"	George McCowan	Robert C. Dennis	February 26, 1975
94	21	"Lady on the Run"	George McCowan	Gerald Sanford	March 5, 1975
95	22	"Vengeance"	Alf Kjellin	Robert I. Holt	March 12, 1975
96	23	"Tomorrow Ends at Noon"	William Wiard	Robert C. Dennis	March 19, 1975
97	24	"Search and Destroy"	Edward M. Abroms	S : Robert Mitchell & Esther Mitchell; T : Stephen Kandel	April 2, 1975

=== Season 5 (1975–76) ===
No. overall	No. in season	Title	Directed by	Written by	Original release date
98	1	"Nightmare"	Paul Stanley	Robert Lenski	September 10, 1975
99	2	"The Deadly Conspiracy: Part 1"	Michael Caffey	Stephen Kandel	September 17, 1975
100	3	"The Wrong Medicine"	Paul Stanley	Norman Lessing	September 24, 1975
101	4	"The Iceman"	William Wiard	Larry Alexander	October 1, 1975
102	5	"The Victim"	Lawrence Dobkin	Jimmy Sangster	October 8, 1975
103	6	"The Man Who Died Twice"	William Wiard	S.S. Schweitzer	October 15, 1975
104	7	"A Touch of Venom"	Chris Robinson	Larry Alexander	October 22, 1975
105	8	"Man in the Middle"	Allen Reisner	Richard Landau	October 29, 1975
106	9	"Fall Guy"	Lawrence Dobkin	Howard Dimsdale	November 5, 1975
107	10	"The Melted Man"	Leo Penn	Norman Lessing	November 12, 1975
108	11	"The Wedding March"	Leo Penn	Brad Radnitz	November 19, 1975
109	12	"The Hero"	William Wiard	Irving Pearlberg	November 26, 1975
110	13	"To Still the Voice"	Leo Penn	S : Robert Heverly; S/T : S.S. Schweitzer	December 3, 1975
111 112	14 15	"The Star"	William Wiard	Margaret Armen	December 10, 1975
113	16	"The Games Children Play"	William Wiard	S : Jack Turley; T : Albert Aley	December 17, 1975
114	17	"The Reformer"	Lawrence Dobkin	Larry Forrester	January 7, 1976
115	18	"The House of Cards"	Kenneth Gilbert	Robert I. Holt	January 14, 1976
116	19	"Revenge"	Paul Stanley	Gene Thompson	January 21, 1976
117	20	"Cry Wolf"	Lawrence Dobkin	T : Carey Wilber; S/T : Stephen Kandel	January 28, 1976
118	21	"The Quasar Kill"	William Wiard	Terence Tunberg & Karl Tunberg	February 4, 1976
119	22	"Snapshot"	Michael Caffey	Leonard Kantor	February 11, 1976
120	23	"Point After Death"	Chris Robinson	T : Mann Rubin; S/T : Robert I. Holt	February 18, 1976
121	24	"Bloodlines"	David Whorf	T : Anthony Spinner & Gene Thompson; S/T : Robert C. Dennis	February 25, 1976
122	25	"Madman"	William Wiard	Larry Forrester	March 3, 1976

== Television film (1980) ==
Title	Directed by	Written by	Original release date
The Return of Frank Cannon	Corey Allen	James David Buchanan & Ronald Austin	November 1, 1980
Private detective Frank Cannon comes out of retirement to investigate the murder of an ex-girlfriend's husband.

== Home releases ==
The first three season were released between 2008 and 2013. A Complete Series edition was released on September 8, 2015 by VEI Entertainment

DVD set	Episodes	Release date
Cannon: Season 1, Volume 1	12	8 August 2008
Cannon: Season 1, Volume 2	13	2 December 2008
Cannon: Season 2, Volume 1	12	2 June 2009
Cannon: Season 2, Volume 2	12	16 February 2010
Cannon: Season 3	25	10 January 2013
Complete Series	122 + Pilot movie + "Return of Frank Cannon"	8 September 2015

== See also ==
- List of Barnaby Jones episodes - includes Part 2 of "The Deadly Conspiracy of the Dropped Flower Pot"
