= List of T. J. Hooker episodes =

T. J. Hooker is an American police drama television series starring William Shatner in the title role as a 15-year veteran police sergeant. The series premiered as a mid-season replacement on March 13, 1982, on ABC and ran on the network until May 4, 1985. The show was then picked up for a further single season by CBS.

Shout! Factory acquired the DVD rights and released a box set of all five seasons on July 18, 2017.

== Series overview ==
Season	Episodes	Originally released		
Season	Episodes	First released	Last released	Network
1	5	March 13, 1982	April 10, 1982	ABC
2	22	September 25, 1982	May 7, 1983	ABC
3	22	October 1, 1983	May 12, 1984	ABC
4	23	October 13, 1984	May 4, 1985	ABC
5	19	September 25, 1985	May 28, 1986	CBS

== Episodes ==
=== Season 1 (1982) ===
No. overall	No. in season	Title	Directed by	Written by	Original release date
1	1	"The Protectors"	Cliff Bole	Rick Husky	March 13, 1982
William Shatner is T. J. Hooker, a veteran cop hardened by divorce and the shooting death of his partner. In the opener, Captain Dennis Sheridan (Richard Herd) assigns Hooker to train recruits pending the investigation of a controversial shooting in which he was involved. Hooker is partnered with rookie cop Vincent Romano (Adrian Zmed).
2	2	"The Streets"	Cliff Bole	Rick Husky	March 20, 1982
Hooker has to escort an overeager newswoman (Karen Carlson) while hunting for a mugger who leaves a Bible at the scene of his crimes. Guest starring: Karen Carlson, George Murdock, John Furlong, Victor Brandt, Pamela Brull, Buck Young, Maurice Manson; Special guest star: Gary Frank
3	3	"God Bless the Child"	Harry Falk	Rick Husky	March 27, 1982
Hooker doesn't believe a teen-age junkie's (Deborah Foreman) fatal fall from a building was suicide. Guest starring: Rick Lenz, Tom Nardini, Steve Sandor, Ed Bernard, Paul Kent, Lee Bryant, Ted Gehring, Hank Brandt, Janis Hansen, John Shepherd, Pamela Brull, Deborah Foreman, Bobby Pickett, Davis Roberts and Nicole Eggert
4	4	"Hooker's War"	Charlie Picerni	Leo Garen	April 3, 1982
A van stopped for running a red light turns out to be filled with illegal firearms. Guest starring: Sid Haig, Vic Tayback, Paul Picerni, Mickey Jones, Richard Moll, Beau Starr, and Diana Bellamy; Special guest star:
5	5	"The Witness"	Cliff Bole	Gerald Sanford	April 10, 1982
Hooker tries to persuade a frightened woman to testify against a psychotic murderer (Jonathan Banks). April Clough's final appearance in the series, although Officer Taylor's nameplate was seen on a desk in the Season 2 episode "Vengeance Is Mine."; Guest starring: Lisa Hartman Black, Jonathan Banks, Michael O'Hare, Robert Hogan, Michael Pataki, Ted Gehring, Joseph Whipp, and Gene LeBell

=== Season 2 (1982–83) ===
Introduced at the start of the second season was attractive Officer Stacy Sheridan (Heather Locklear), the daughter of Captain Sheridan who attended the police academy and replaced Vicki (April Clough).

No. overall	No. in season	Title	Directed by	Written by	Original release date
6	1	"Second Chance"	Don Weis	Mark Rodgers	September 25, 1982
Hooker links a recent homicide and an unsolved case he investigated eight years earlier. Meanwhile, a new police desk clerk named Stacy Sheridan (Heather Locklear) has caught Romano's attention, unaware that she is the Captain's daughter. Robert Davi guest stars as Joe "The Barber" Picartus. Guest starring: Rebecca Holden, Robert Davi, Victor Campos, Al Ruscio, De'voreaux White, Betsy Russell and Peter Mamakos
7	2	"King of the Hill"	Charlie Picerni	Stephen Downing	October 2, 1982
Hooker tries to clear a friend (James Darren) arrested for a series of robberies when custom parts from the getaway cars are traced to his auto-repair shop. Romano takes part in a departmental go-cart race. (Although this was Darren's first appearance in the series, he would not play his regular role of Jim Corrigan until the second-to-last episode of this season.); Guest starring: James Darren, Donna Wilkes, Gary Graham, Phil Rubenstein and Richard McGonagle
8	3	"The Empty Gun"	Cliff Bole	Paul Savage	October 16, 1982
Fellow officers criticize Romano for not shooting a juvenile who killed an officer. Guest starring: Jeanette Nolan, Herbert Jefferson Jr. and Scott Thomson
9	4	"Blind Justice"	Don Chaffey	S : Walter Dallenbach; S/T : Joe Viola & Stephen Downing	October 23, 1982
Hooker tries to protect a frightened robbery witness (played by Shatner's then-wife, Marcy Lafferty) from the culprits — who don't know she's blind. Carl Wilson of the Beach Boys has a cameo as himself. Guest starring: Darrell Fetty, Tony Burton and Raf Mauro; Special guest star: The Beach Boys
10	5	"Big Foot"	Cliff Bole	Dallas & JoAnne Barnes	October 30, 1982
Hooker and Romano pursue a rapist who's left just one clue: a size 13 footprint. Guest starring: Robin Dearden, Ray Girardin, Holly Gagnier, Martin Azarow and Tony Perez
11	6	"Terror at the Academy"	Phil Bondelli	S : Rick Husky; S/T : Jack V. Fogarty	November 6, 1982
A vengeful sniper who has been shooting at police cars is planning to attack the police academy. Guest starring: Kristoffer Tabori, Doran Clark, Melody Anderson, Norman Bartold, Lee Bryant, Valentin de Vargas and Nicole Eggert
12	7	"The Survival Syndrome"	Charlie Picerni	Dallas & JoAnne Barnes	November 13, 1982
News footage and eyewitness accounts point to the same conclusion: Hooker shot and killed an unarmed youth on a crowded street. Guest starring: Robert Fields, Chris Mulkey, Mark Soper, Lee Bryant, Ken Hixon and Tawny Little
13	8	"Deadly Ambition"	Michael Preece	Arthur Weingarten	November 20, 1982
An ambitious detective is out to nail Hooker's friend on a charge of aiding jewel thieves while working as a diamond-exchange guard. Legendary musician Jerry Lee Lewis appears as himself. Guest starring: Cliff Potts, Jonathan Goldsmith, Jesse Vint, Royce D. Applegate, Deborah Foreman and Sam Scarber; Special guest star: Jerry Lee Lewis
14	9	"A Cry for Help"	Cliff Bole	Jack V. Fogarty	November 27, 1982
Hooker helps a hearing-impaired teenager who's been left to take a murder rap by his fellow gang members. Guest starring: Henry Darrow, Pamela Susan Shoop, Rafael Campos, Miguel Fernandes, Trinidad Silva and Philip Baker Hall
15	10	"Thieves' Highway"	Michael Preece	Roger H. Lewis & Devorah Cutler	December 4, 1982
Hooker tries to avert a war between independent truckers and a produce wholesaler who's been sabotaging their trucks.
16	11	"The Connection"	Corey Allen	Donald R. Boyle	December 18, 1982
Hooker searches for a dealer supplying PCP to high-school students.
17	12	"The Fast Lane"	Don Chaffey	Jeffrey M. Hayes	January 8, 1983
Concern for a teenager in trouble leads Romano and Hooker to a gang of thieves selling stolen liquor to high-school students.
18	13	"Too Late for Love"	Michael Preece	Jack V. Fogarty	January 15, 1983
Romano unwittingly supplies information to fur thieves when he falls for a pretty model who's working for the gang.
19	14	"The Decoy"	Leonard Nimoy	Mark Rodgers	January 22, 1983
Stacy acts as a decoy to flush out a psychotic who has killed five women — including a cop.
20	15	"The Mumbler"	Don Chaffey	Joe Viola	January 29, 1983
Thieves blow up an armored car and take flight leaving only one clue: a homing pigeon's metal leg band.
21	16	"Vengeance Is Mine"	Phil Bondelli	Allison Hock	February 5, 1983
William Shatner and his Star Trek co-star Leonard Nimoy are reunited in a tale of a detective's quest for revenge against the man who raped his daughter. Trivia: In his memoir Up Til Now, William Shatner wrote that Leonard Nimoy agreed to guest-star on the condition that he also be allowed to direct an episode, which he did with the same season's "The Decoy."
22	17	"Sweet Sixteen and Dead"	William Shatner	Joe Viola	February 12, 1983
Hooker's concern for a teenage prostitute leads him to a pimp who's bribing city officials.
23	18	"Raw Deal"	Cliff Bole	Jack V. Fogarty & Simon Muntner	February 19, 1983
A cocaine dealer recruits couriers from the ranks of compulsive gamblers deeply in debt to his poker club.
24	19	"Requiem for a Cop"	Don Chaffey	Gerald Sanford	February 26, 1983
A private investigator's murder puts Hooker on the trail of an arsonist (David Caruso) who's torching condemned buildings.
25	20	"The Hostages"	Cliff Bole	Robert Earll	March 5, 1983
Fran Hooker and Stacy are taken hostage in a hospital by robbers who are trying to break out their critically wounded cohort. (Jenny Beck, who played Valerie in this episode, later would appear as Chrissie Hooker in the fourth-season episode "Homecoming" as well as the fifth-season premiere, "The Ransom.")
26	21	"Payday Pirates"	Sigmund Neufeld Jr.	Paul B. Margolis	April 30, 1983
Hooker's ex-wife Fran is knocked out during a factory-district robbery. Meanwhile, Hooker assigns Stacy to field conditioning, teaming her with no-nonsense training officer Jim Corrigan (James Darren). (While this is Darren's first appearance as Jim Corrigan, a role he would fill for every episode except one the rest of the series, this marks the final appearances for Lee Bryant as Fran Hooker and Nicole Eggert as Chrissie Hooker. Leigh Christian played Fran in "The Ransom.")
27	22	"Lady in Blue"	William Shatner	Rick Husky	May 7, 1983
A rookie cop is wounded by fleeing gun thieves, and Hooker blames himself for teaching her the aggressive style of pursuit that led to the shooting.

=== Season 3 (1983–84) ===
The third season saw a slight revamp (including the theme music being rearranged into a more pop-driven version), with James Darren promoted to series regular in the credits, and Richard Herd appearing as 'Special Guest Star' in six third-season episodes and three in the fourth season.

No. overall	No. in season	Title	Directed by	Written by	Original release date
28	1	"The Return"	Sigmund Neufeld Jr.	Mark Rodgers	October 1, 1983
Hooker pursues bank robbers who use the same tactics as the gang that wounded him and killed his partner five years earlier.
29	2	"Carnal Express"	Sigmund Neufeld Jr.	Joe Viola	October 8, 1983
Stacy goes undercover as an exotic dancer to crack a white-slavery ring.
30	3	"Chinatown"	Don Chaffey	Jack V. Fogarty & Simon Muntner	October 15, 1983
Chinatown is the scene of a thriving black market in guns and, for Hooker, a place where more than memory links him to the past.
31	4	"The Cheerleader Murder"	Cliff Bole	Gerald Sanford	October 22, 1983
The murder of a high school cheerleader leads Hooker to an illegal abortion clinic and a pornographic film ring.
32	5	"Shadow of Truth"	Cliff Bole	Robert Sherman	October 29, 1983
Two separate murders occur near a muckraking reporter (Helen Shaver), and Hooker suspects that she was the target.
33	6	"Walk a Straight Line"	Cliff Bole	Rick Kelbaugh	November 5, 1983
Hooker must decide whether to report a veteran cop's alcoholism after his on-the-job drinking leads to the shooting of the cop's partner.
34	7	"A Child Is Missing"	Cliff Bole	Jack B. Sowards	November 12, 1983
On a "fishing trip" in Mexico, Hooker trolls for a diamond thief who also kidnapped his own son as an act of revenge against the boy's mother.
35	8	"The Trial"	Cliff Bole	Stephen Downing	November 19, 1983
Romano feels betrayed when Hooker defends an officer (Lenore Kasdorf) charged with cowardice in an incident that left Romano wounded.
36	9	"Matter of Passion"	Sigmund Neufeld Jr.	Dick Nelson	November 26, 1983
A murder investigation leads Hooker to a drug-money laundering ring.
37	10	"Blue Murder"	Don Chaffey	Paul B. Margolis	December 3, 1983
Pursuing the killers of criminals freed on technicalities is Hooker's unhappy task: the suspects are fellow officers. This episode is heavily influenced by the film Magnum Force.
38	11	"Undercover Affair"	Charlie Picerni	Simon Muntner	December 10, 1983
Hooker is suspended when his pursuit of heroin pushers interferes with federal agents who are after the ring's supplier.
39	12	"Slay Ride"	Bruce Kessler	Rick Husky	December 17, 1983
Stacy becomes emotionally attached to a sick baby abandoned by a couple involved in armed robberies.
40	13	"The Lipstick Killer"	Sigmund Neufeld Jr.	Robert C. Dennis and Jack V. Fogarty & Ed Waters	January 7, 1984
The pattern Hooker detects in the murders of several nurses suggests he has less than 48 hours to prevent the killer from striking again. (This episode marks the first appearance of Lt. Pete O'Brien, played by Hugh Farrington. O'Brien's character filled the superior's role taken by Captain Dennis Sheridan throughout the early part of the series.)
41	14	"The Snow Game"	William Shatner	Fred McKnight	January 14, 1984
Hooker and Corrigan go undercover as drug dealers to nail the kingpins of a cocaine ring.
42	15	"Exercise in Murder"	Phil Bondelli	S : Ed Waters; T : Jack V. Fogarty & Simon Muntner	January 28, 1984
The pursuit of a gang of diamond thieves leads to a broken romance for Corrigan and tragedy for Hooker after he accidentally shoots a nine-year-old boy.
43	16	"Hooker's Run"	Cliff Bole	Simon Muntner	February 4, 1984
A murderer's former girlfriend (Shanna Reed) could send him to prison with her testimony, if Hooker can keep her alive and plug the security leak that led to the death of another witness.
44	17	"Hot Property"	Ric Rondell	Chester Krumholz	February 25, 1984
Stacy's future, which includes prospects of marriage, looks bright until she is implicated in the disappearance of two kilograms of heroin from a major bust.
45	18	"Death on the Line"	Cliff Bole	Jack V. Fogarty	March 3, 1984
Although the man implicated in a series of rapes and robberies is dead, Hooker isn't convinced the case is closed.
46	19	"Death Strip"	Sigmund Neufeld Jr.	Patrick Mathews	March 10, 1984
Romano poses as a stripper in a club where the owner and a dancer are suspects in a cocaine ring.
47	20	"Psychic Terror"	Kenneth R. Koch	William Kelley	March 24, 1984
After a girl is kidnapped, a skeptical Hooker is assigned to work with a psychic (Marcy Lafferty, Shatner's then-wife who was making her second of four appearances in the series), who's been having a recurring dream of Hooker's death.
48	21	"Gang War"	William Shatner	Sidney Ellis	May 5, 1984
With two barrio gangs threatening to launch an all-out war, Hooker pursues the real cause of unrest — an illegal-arms dealer who would profit handsomely.
49	22	"Deadlock"	Sigmund Neufeld Jr.	Bruce Shelly & David Ketchum	May 12, 1984
After interrupting a weapons heist, Romano is wounded and Hooker – who knows his own revolver is empty – is trapped in an elevator in a guns-drawn test of wills with one of the thieves.

=== Season 4 (1984–85) ===
No. overall	No. in season	Title	Directed by	Written by	Original release date	Prod. code
50	1	"Night Vigil"	Winrich Kolbe	Frank Telford	October 13, 1984	181665
Hooker puts his career on the line combing the city for a burly robber who shot Stacy and left her with a bullet lodged close to her heart.
51	2	"The Two Faces of Betsy Morgan"	Paul Krasny	Robert Bielak	October 20, 1984	181673
A teenaged prostitute (Jill Whitlow) is targeted by a pair of psychotic killers who know she can identify them in the murder of another girl.
52	3	"Pursuit"	Sidney Hayers	Paul Savage	October 27, 1984	181670
Hooker and the department draw the fire of a city councilman over their use of high-speed pursuit after a bank hold-up hostage loses her unborn child during a chase.
53	4	"Hardcore Connection"	Christian I. Nyby II	Stephen Downing	November 3, 1984	181667
Hooker leans on a reluctant ex-prostitute (Heather Thomas) whose ex-roommate could clear the name of a dead vice cop accused of taking a bribe from the head of a porno ring (Dennis Franz).
54	5	"Anatomy of a Killing"	Sigmund Neufeld Jr.	Stephen Downing	November 10, 1984	181683
Hooker volunteers to help a colleague (Jim Brown) solve a drug-related murder and finds that the cop's daughter (Penny Johnson) — a heroin addict — is their only hope for convicting the killers. This is the final appearance in the series by Richard Herd.
55	6	"Target: Hooker"	Vincent McEveety	Simon Muntner	November 17, 1984	181664
Romano is temporarily blinded and his girlfriend is killed during two attempts on Hooker's life.
56	7	"Model for Murder"	Harry Falk	Janis Hendler	November 24, 1984	181681
Stacy goes undercover to find out who's responsible for the grisly deaths of two fashion models.
57	8	"A Kind of Rage"	Winrich Kolbe	Rick Kelbaugh	December 1, 1984	181669
A blow to the head precipitates episodes of explosive behavior in Corrigan. Meanwhile, Hooker tries to stop a strangler of skid-row denizens.
58	9	"The Confession"	Georg Fenady	Paul B. Margolis	December 15, 1984	181672
Hooker pursues the man who raped a female priest, but he's stymied by the victim, who won't testify after hearing her attacker's confession.
59	10	"Grand Theft Auto"	Sidney Hayers	B.W. Sandefur	December 29, 1984	
Romano's new sports car is stolen, but the 10-year-old Gypsy (Tori Spelling) who witnessed the crime and the subsequent murder of her uncle won't talk to the police. Hooker solicits the help of the girl's sister (Delta Burke).
60	11	"Street Bait"	Sigmund Neufeld Jr.	Judy Burns	January 5, 1985	181674
Stacy poses as bait for a killer of young blonde women and turns up a strong case against a vice cop moonlighting as a security officer.
61	12	"The Surrogate"	Bruce Seth Green	Joseph Gunn	January 12, 1985	181671
Hooker tries to persuade a radio sex therapist (Belinda Montgomery) to help him search for the killer of four unfaithful wives — all of whom were callers to her program.
62	13	"Trackdown"	Reza Badiyi	Mark Rodgers	January 26, 1985	181684
A colleague from Hooker's detective days needs help tracking down a serial killer who's taken hostages.
63	14	"Outcall"	Larry Elikann	Dick Nelson	February 2, 1985	
Stacy poses as a masseuse to find out who's trying to take over massage parlors.
64	15	"The Bribe"	Sigmund Neufeld Jr.	Mark Rodgers	February 9, 1985	181666
Hooker's charged with bribery and corruption, then leaves for Las Vegas to meet with the prostitute accused of paying him off.
65	16	"Love Story"	Ray Danton	Stephen Downing & Judy Burns	February 16, 1985	181685
Hooker's fierce pursuit of the gang behind a series of rapes and robberies may be motivated more by revenge than duty: a friend was a victim.
66	17	"Hollywood Starr"	Winrich Kolbe & William Shatner	Rick Husky & Stephen Downing	February 23, 1985	181686
Hooker teams up with a young Hollywood detective named Dani Starr (Sharon Stone) in search of a jewel thief named Gable (Jonathan Goldsmith) wanted for murder and other felonies. Hooker awakens bound and gagged by Gable in a closet leading him to thrash around in a panic trying to free himself and Dani Starr chases Gable through an abandoned factory trying to stop him and retrieve the jewels. She has a close-call with Gable nearly being hit by his car. What is Gable's actual motive? Filmed as a back door pilot featuring Sharon Stone that was not picked up.
67	18	"Sanctuary"	William Shatner	Mark Rodgers	March 2, 1985	181687
Stacy and a seriously wounded Corrigan are taken hostage by a murderous trio who take refuge in a church, demanding safe passage to Mexico. (William Shatner's then-wife, Marcy Lafferty, makes her third appearance in the series. Lafferty also appeared in the second-season episode "Blind Justice", the third-season episode "Psychic Terror", and "Partners in Death" in the fifth season.)
68	19	"Homecoming"	Kenneth R. Koch	Rick Husky	March 9, 1985	181688
Hooker's vacation with his children is interrupted by a race-track robbery that leaves an officer dead. (Jenny Beck plays Chrissie in this episode and the fifth-season premiere, "The Ransom." Nicole Eggert played Chrissie in five first- and second-season episodes.)
69	20	"Serial Murders"	Michael Caffey	Adrian Spies & Chester Krumholz	March 16, 1985	181675
An officer's cocaine problem endangers Hooker as they pursue suspects in a string of cross-country serial murders.
70	21	"Lag Time"	Sigmund Neufeld Jr.	T : Rick Kelbaugh; S/T : William Keys	March 23, 1985	181677
Stacy loses her confidence after a procedural lapse with a robbery suspect nearly costs her her life.
71	22	"The Throwaway"	William Shatner	James J. Docherty	April 6, 1985	181680
Corrigan is accused of planting a "throwaway" gun on a suspect he shot while investigating a series of box-office heists. This is the final appearance in the series for Adrian Zmed.
72	23	"The Chicago Connection"	Michael Lange	Steve Kline & Bernie Kukoff	May 4, 1985	181690
A "three-hour" extradition trip to Chicago becomes an extended stay for Hooker when he goes undercover to nail a heroin dealer. William Shatner is the only regular cast member to appear in this episode, which was to relocate Hooker to Chicago to work alongside a new partner in a new environment. The proposed reboot was dropped when ABC cancelled the series.

=== Season 5 (1985–86) ===
After Season 4, the show was cancelled by ABC. Adrian Zmed took over as host of Dance Fever for its final two seasons after the departure of Deney Terrio and was unavailable for Season 5 on CBS.

No. overall	No. in season	Title	Directed by	Written by	Original release date
73	1	"The Ransom"	William Shatner	Judy Burns	September 25, 1985
Hooker's daughter is kidnapped by an ex-cop. The ransom: the whereabouts of the guy's own family — relocated by the FBI after he was sentenced to prison.
74	2	"Return of a Cop"	Cliff Bole	Stephen Downing	October 2, 1985
Hooker's dad (John McLiam), a retired cop, arrives unexpectedly and shows more than a passing interest in Hooker's current case.
75	3	"To Kill a Cop"	Chuck Bowman	Paul Savage	October 9, 1985
A cop killer has also targeted the dead man's partner.
76	4	"Death Is a Four-Letter Word"	Bruce Seth Green	James Schmerer	November 6, 1985
The investigation of a 17-year-old porno actress's murder is hampered by her uncle (Christopher Stone), a cop obsessed with nailing the killers himself.
77	5	"The Assassin"	Richard Compton	Rick Husky	November 13, 1985
A man Hooker served with in Vietnam is out to assassinate a Russian trade delegate.
78	6	"Rip-Off"	Cliff Bole	Stephen Downing	November 20, 1985
Hooker clashes with a Fed out to bust the drug dealer who killed one of Hooker's cops in a bungled sting operation.
79	7	"Funny Money"	Michael Caffey	Gerald Petievich	November 27, 1985
Corrigan gives serious consideration to leaving the force after pulling the trigger in two fatal shootings.
80	8	"Night Ripper"	Michael Caffey	Don Ingalls	January 29, 1986
Hooker's under pressure to solve a grisly series of sex murders.
81	9	"The Obsession"	Phil Bondelli	Rick Kelbaugh & Karen Klein	February 5, 1986
Armed robbers take Stacy hostage, and one of the suspects has personal ties to the mayor.
82	10	"Taps for Officer Remy"	Reza Badiyi	Chuck Bowman	February 12, 1986
Hooker probes the "murder" of an officer who was once his lover.
83	11	"Nightmare"	Reza Badiyi	Rick Husky	February 19, 1986
Stacy loses her memory following a car accident and is taken in by a motorist who says he's a doctor.
84	12	"Shootout"	William Shatner	Mark Rodgers	February 26, 1986
Stacy's job performance is hampered by the fear that she'll be the next victim of a murderous gang of bank robbers.
85	13	"Murder by Law"	Chuck Bowman	Rick Husky	April 30, 1986
Hooker searches for a murderer whose victims all were female lawyers who attended the same law school.
86	14	"Partners in Death"	William Shatner	Lisabeth Shatner	May 7, 1986
Corrigan and Stacy's preoccupation with each other leads to an incident that leaves Hooker wounded. (William Shatner's wife, Marcy Lafferty, makes her fourth and final appearance in the series in this episode as Stephanie Bailey, one of the criminals being pursued.)
87	15	"Death Trip"	Chuck Bowman	Joe Gores	May 19, 1986
Hooker protects a retired mobster-turned-informant—the latest target of a right-wing paramilitary group.
88	16	"Blood Sport: Parts 1 & 2"	Vincent McEveety	Stan Berkowitz, Rudolph Borchert, Rick Husky, Don Ingalls & Bruce Reisman	May 21, 1986
89	17	"Blood Sport: Parts 1 & 2"	Vincent McEveety	Stan Berkowitz, Rudolph Borchert, Rick Husky, Don Ingalls & Bruce Reisman	May 21, 1986
Hooker, Corrigan and Sheridan travel to Hawaii on special assignment to protect the life of a U.S. Senator and his family who are threatened by terrorists.
90	18	"Into the Night"	James Darren	Rick Husky	May 21, 1986
While off duty, Hooker is forced to shoot a hitman before he can find out who the man was hired to kill.
91	19	"Deadly Force"	Michael Hamilton	Stephen Lord	May 28, 1986
Hooker's pursuit of a murderous jewelry-store robber is impeded by a TV-news reporter.
