= Will McMillan =

American actor (1944–2015)

- Born: William George McMillan; November 25, 1944; Steubenville, Ohio, U.S.
- Died: December 2, 2015 (aged 71); Burbank, California
- Occupations: Actor; producer; director
- Years active: 1972–2012
- Parent(s): William Claude and Nellie McMillan

William George McMillan (November 25, 1944 – December 2, 2015) was an American actor, producer, and director.

== Early life ==
McMillan was born on November 25, 1944, in Steubenville, Ohio, to William Claude and Nellie McMillan. While attending Weir High School, he played both offense and defense for the football team that won the 1960 State Championship. McMillan attended Washington & Jefferson College where he received a BA degree. He attended Boston University where he received a Masters of Fine Arts.

== Career ==
=== Film ===
In the 1970s, McMillan moved to California to pursue a career in acting. In 1972, he started his career with White Rat as Lieutenant. McMillan next starred as David in the 1973 film The Crazies. In 1976, he starred in The Enforcer, the third in the Dirty Harry film series, as Lt. Dobbs. In 1983, McMillan starred in Tin Man as Artie. In 1986, he starred in Oliver Stone's Salvador as Colonel Bentley Hyde Sr.

=== Television ===
McMillan guest starred in a number of television shows including Three's Company, Charlie's Angels, Knight Rider, Hunter, Knots Landing, Matlock, and Diagnosis: Murder. In 1984, he would land the role of Boris Roskov on ABC's General Hospital.

=== Later career ===
McMillan would enter into a different medium, Videos. He was in 1986's Cards of Death as Captain Twain, 1990's Dark Romances Vol. 1 as a bartender, and 1994's Schemes as a mean junkman.

== Personal life and death ==
McMillan married Laura Bahrs in 1981. They had 4 children.

He died on December 2, 2015, in Burbank, California. He was survived by his wife, their four children, and his sister.

== Filmography ==
=== Film ===
Year	Title	Role	Notes	Ref.
1972	White Rat	Lieutenant	Directed by Steven Mullin.	
1973	The Crazies	David	Also known as Code Name: Trixie; Credited as W.G. McMillan; American science fiction horror-action film written and directed by George A. Romero.	
1974	The Sister-in-Law	Edward Strong	Credited as W.G. McMillan; Written and directed by Joseph Ruben in his directorial debut.; Received an R rating from the MPAA.	
1976	Goldenrod	Ethan Gifford		
1976	The Enforcer	Lt. Dobbs	American action film and the third in the Dirty Harry film series.; Directed by James Fargo.	
1980	Used Cars	Police Sergeant		
1980	Christmas Evil	Young Man		
1983	Tin Man	Artie	Directed by John G. Thomas.	
1986	Salvador	Colonel Bentley Hyde Sr.	War drama film written by Oliver Stone and Richard Boyle and directed by Stone.	
1993	Aspen Extreme	Beard	Uncredited	
1994	Bad Girls	Colonel Clayborne	Western film directed by Jonathan Kaplan.	
2005	Monarch of the Moon	Col. Slate		
2008	Jada	Hutch	Dramatic film directed by Clifton Powell.	
2008	Unbound	Warden	Directed by Wes Llewellyn.; Written by Amanda Llewellyn.	
2008	Eva's Desert	War Hero	Directed by Lisa Miosi.	
2009	Broken	Grandfather	Directed by Patrick G. Ingram.	
2010	The Challenge	God	Written, directed, shot, edited and produced by Alex Berteanu with the close help of Tibi Cosneanu.	
2011	Eye of the Storm	Verizombie	Australian drama film directed by Fred Schepisi.; An adaptation of Patrick White's 1973 novel of the same name.; Won the critics award for best Australian feature at the 2011 Melbourne International Film Festival.	
2012	House Arrest	Judge	Directed by William Washington., (final film role)	

=== Television ===
Year	Title	Role	Notes	Ref.
1977	The Four of Us	Andy	unsold pilot	
1977	Three's Company	Policeman	Episode: "Alone Together" (S 2:Ep 6); Credited as W.G. McMillan	
1980	Enola Gay: The Men, the Mission, the Atomic Bomb		TV film directed by David Lowell Rich	
1981	Charlie's Angels	John Wheeler	Episode: "Mr. Galaxy" (S 5 :Ep 15)	
1981	Little House on the Prairie	Bartender	Episode: "Chicago" (S 8:Ep 8)	
1981	The Greatest American Hero	Kerner	Episode: "Saturday Night on Sunset Boulevard" (S 1:Ep 5)	
1982	Little House on the Prairie	3rd Man	Episode: "A Faraway Cry" (S 8:Ep 20)	
1982	The Greatest American Hero	Commander	Credited as Will MacMillan; Episode: "Good Samaritan" (S 2:Ep 19)	
1982	Father Murphy	Bartender	Episode: "The Father Figure" (S 2:Ep 2)	
1983	Knight Rider	Sheriff Casey	Episode: "Ring of Fire" (S 2:Ep 10)	
1984	The A-Team	Joe	Episode: "Sheriffs of Rivertown" (S 3:Ep 10)	
1984	General Hospital	Boris Roskov	Credited as William MacMillan; Unknown episodes	
1985	Riptide	Hobbs	Episode: "Boz Busters" (S 2:Ep 15)	
1985	Hunter	Will Donaldson	Episode: "The Garbage Man" (S 1:Ep 11)	
1985	Hunter	Parole Officer	Episode: "Guilty" (S 1:Ep 16)	
1986	Moonlighting	Agent Dayton	Episode: "Symphony in Knocked Flat" (S 3:Ep 3)	
1987	Fame	Kenneth Garth	Episode: "Go Softly Into Morning" (S 6:Ep 11)	
1987	Hill Street Blues	Fire Marshal	Episode: "It Ain't Over Till It's Over" (S 7:Ep 22)	
1987	Werewolf	Sheriff Brandt	Episode: "Nothing Evil in These Woods" (S 1:Ep 7)	
1987	Knots Landing	Lieutenant Cox	Episode: "Half-Truths" (S 9:Ep 4)	
1989	Nearly Departed	The Foreman	Episode: "Altared States" (S 1:Ep 3)	
1989	Chameleons	Policeman No. 3	TV movie	
1989	Matlock	Sheriff Dan Guerney	Episode: "The Blues Singer" (S 3:Ep 19)	
1990	Fine Things	U.S. Marshal	TV movie	
1991	Father Dowling Mysteries	Guest	Episode: "The Fugitive Priest Mystery" (S 3:Ep 11)	
1991	Equal Justice	Judge Wilcox	Episode: "Courting Disaster"	
1991	L.A. Law	Judge Colonel Barney Massien	Episode: "Rest in Pieces" (S 5:Ep 2)	
1991	Guns of Paradise	Marshal Gordon	Episode: "Shield of Gold" (S 3:Ep 11); Was Paradise before being renamed.	
1991	Reasonable Doubts	Jablonski	Episode: "...and Sleep Won't Come"	
1991	Life Goes On	Colonel Fielding	Episode: "Invasion of the Thatcher Snatchers"	
1992	Matlock	Lt. Lucas Wells	Episode: "The Outcast, part 1" (S 6: Ep 14)	
1992	Matlock	Lt. Lucas Wells	Episode: "The Outcast, part 2" (S 6: Ep 15)	
1992	Renegade	Buck	Uncredited; Episode: "Mother Courage" (S 1:Ep 5)	
1992	Willing to Kill: The Texas Cheerleader Story	Uncredited	TV Movie; Directed by David Greene.	
1992	Santa Barbara	Poacher	3 episodes	
1993	Aspen Extreme	Beard	Uncredited; Directed by Patrick Hasburgh	
1993	Homefront	Guest	Episode: "Shabbat Shalom"	
1993	Danger Theatre	Cash McClean	Credited as Will Macmillan; Episode: "Comes a Searcher/Vengeance in the Grass"	
1994	Diagnosis: Murder	Officer	Episode: "My Four Husbands" (S 2:Ep 5)	
1995	Murder One	Angus Ramsey	Episode: "Chapter Six"	
1997	Beverly Hills, 90210	Tony	Episode: "Phantom of C.U." (S 7:Ep 15)	
1999	NYPD Blue	George Franklin	Episode: :"Raphael's Inferno" (S 6:Ep 14)	
2004	Las Vegas	Woodlief	Episode: "Die Fast, Die Furious" (S 1:Ep 15)	
2004	The Young and the Restless	Jerry Gunderson	Episode: "Episode #1.8014"	
2005	The West Wing	David Adams	Episode: "2162 Votes" (S 6:Ep 22)	
2006	Close to Home	Henry's Attorney	Episode: "Legacy" (S 2:Ep 5)	
2008	Raising the Bar	Frank Nolan	Episode: "Out on the Roof" (S 1:Ep 8)	

=== Video ===
Year	Title	Role	Notes	Ref.
1986	Cards of Death	Captain Twain		
1990	Dark Romances Vol. 1	Bartender		
1994	Schemes	Mean Junkman		
