= Caged Fury =

Caged Fury may refer to:

- Caged Fury (1948 film), a drama film
- Caged Fury (1983 film), film by Cirio H. Santiago with Taaffe O'Connell
- Caged Fury (1989 film), a women in prison film

== See also ==
- Caged Heat II: Stripped of Freedom, the sequel to the 1989 film starring Jewel Shepard
