= Rick Fitts =

American film and television actor

- Occupations: Film and television actor
- Years active: 1980–present
- Website: rickfitts.com

Rick Fitts is an American film and television actor. He is known for playing the role of the ruthless businessman Martin Jackson on 120 episodes of the American soap opera television series Generations.

Fitts guest-starred in numerous television programs including Seinfeld, Star Trek: The Next Generation, Three's a Crowd, Coach, Diff'rent Strokes, Home Improvement, Desperate Housewives, The A-Team, and others. He also appeared in films, such as, Summer Camp Nightmare, The Hanoi Hilton, The Kid with the Broken Halo, Banzai Runner, The West Side Waltz, Liz: The Elizabeth Taylor Story, Platoon Leader, Grave Secrets: The Legacy of Hilltop Drive, Rescue Me and Naked. Fitts has also done voiceover work, supplying the voice of "Mr. Johanssen" in the animated series Hey Arnold!.

== Filmography ==
=== Film ===
| Year | Title | Role | Notes |
|---|---|---|---|
| 1986 | Summer Camp Nightmare | Ed Heinz | |
| 1987 | The Hanoi Hilton | Turner | |
| 1987 | Banzai Runner | Winaton | |
| 1988 | Platoon Leader | Sgt. Robert Hayes | |
| 1992 | Rescue Me | State Trooper | |
| 1996 | Club V.R. | Dale, the Coroner | |
| 2006 | Something New | Emcee | |
| 2017 | Naked | Father Butterfield | |

=== Television ===
| Year | Title | Role | Notes |
|---|---|---|---|
| 1980 | Lou Grant | Patrolman | Episode: "Goop" |
| 1981 | Diff'rent Strokes | Jason Collins | Episode: "The Ancestors" |
| 1981 | Strike Force | Cop #1 | Episode: "Strike Force" |
| 1982 | World War III | Maj. George Devery | 2 episodes |
| 1982 | The Facts of Life | P.R. Man | Episode: "Starstruck" |
| 1982 | The Kid with the Broken Halo | Tackler | Television film |
| 1982 | T. J. Hooker | Ryan | Episode: "Second Chance" |
| 1982 | Tucker's Witch | Jim Haskel | Episode: "The Curse of the Toltec Death Mask" |
| 1982 | Knight Rider | Brad | Episode: "The Final Verdict" |
| 1982 | It Takes Two | Policeman | Episode: "A Healthy Romance" |
| 1982, 1983 | Benson | Wesley / Mr. Francis | 2 episodes |
| 1983 | Simon & Simon | Knudsen | Episode: "Grand Illusion" |
| 1983 | Knots Landing | Jim Sugar | Episode: "Fugitives" |
| 1983–1985 | Hardcastle and McCormick | Madison, LAPD | 3 episodes |
| 1983, 1986 | The A-Team | Jason Duke / Burrows | 2 episodes |
| 1983–1986 | Gimme a Break! | Various roles | 4 episodes |
| 1984 | Boys in Blue | Detective Miller | Television film |
| 1984 | Silence of the Heart | Dan Norlan | Television film |
| 1984 | Sweet Revenge | Maj. Bill Teague | Television film |
| 1984 | Three's a Crowd | Desk Sergeant | Episode: "A Master of Money" |
| 1984, 1985 | Hunter | Cop / Ray, Detective | 3 episodes |
| 1984–1988 | Santa Barbara | Lt. Victor Boswell / Henchman | 3 episodes |
| 1985 | Moonlighting | Cop | Episode: "Money Talks... Maddie Walks" |
| 1985 | Streets of Justice | Young Worker | Television film |
| 1985, 1986 | Dynasty | 2nd Cop / Dr. Giddings | 2 episodes |
| 1986 | The Redd Foxx Show | Lawrence Jackson | Episode: "Pilot" |
| 1986 | Hill Street Blues | Cop | Episode: "Scales of Justice" |
| 1986 | Amen | Talent Scout | Episode: "Pilot" |
| 1986 | Scarecrow and Mrs. King | Blake | Episode: "Photo Finish" |
| 1986 | 227 | Roy Dobbs | Episode: "Father's Day" |
| 1987 | U.S. Marshals: Waco & Rhinehart | Armory Sergeant | Television film |
| 1987 | What's Happening Now!! | Stan | Episode: "Family Life" |
| 1987 | Jake and the Fatman | Detective Walker | Episode: "Love Me or Leave Me" |
| 1989 | The Case of the Hillside Stranglers | Sgt. Thorpe | Television film |
| 1989–1991 | Generations | Martin Jackson | 120 episodes |
| 1990–1991 | Over My Dead Body | Det. Ritter | 11 episodes |
| 1992 | Star Trek: The Next Generation | Dr. Martin | Episode: "Violations" |
| 1992 | Get a Life | Pebo Griffin | Episode: "SPEWEY and Me" |
| 1992 | Grave Secrets: The Legacy of Hilltop Drive | Robert Garrick | Television film |
| 1993 | Hangin' with Mr. Cooper | Man | Episode: "In Vanessa We Trust" |
| 1993 | Getting By | Robert Harris | Episode: "Turnabout Dance" |
| 1994 | Lois & Clark: The New Adventures of Superman | Frank Madison | Episode: "All Shook Up" |
| 1994 | The Fresh Prince of Bel-Air | Professor Milligan | Episode: "Who's the Boss?" |
| 1994 | Silk Stalkings | Mac Briggs | Episode: "T.K.O." |
| 1994 | The Sinbad Show | Chip | Episode: "David Goes Skiing" |
| 1994 | SeaQuest DSV | Traffic Policeman | Episode: "Abalon" |
| 1994 | Coach | Reporter #1 | Episode: "Graceless Under Fire" |
| 1994 | Party of Five | Officer Garrett | Episode: "Fathers and Sons" |
| 1994 | Seinfeld | Dentist | Episode: "The Mom & Pop Store" |
| 1995 | Liz: The Elizabeth Taylor Story | London interviewer | Television film |
| 1995 | Ellen | Reporter | Episode: "Shake, Rattle and Rubble" |
| 1995 | The Invaders | Secret Service Man | Episode: "Part II" |
| 1995 | Deadly Games | Mac | Episode: "Divorce Lawyer" |
| 1995 | The West Side Waltz | Fireman | Television film |
| 1996 | Home Improvement | Dave | Episode: "Workshop 'Til You Drop" |
| 1996 | Moesha | Dr. Miller | Episode: "There's No Place Like the Mitchell Home" |
| 1996–1997 | High Incident | Booking Officer Tom | 7 episodes |
| 1996–2002 | Hey Arnold! | Martin Johanssen | 7 episodes |
| 1997 | A Nightmare Come True | Chief Surgeon | Television film |
| 1997 | Roseanne | Doctor | Episode: "The Miracle" |
| 1997 | Chicago Hope | Rescue Worker | Episode: "Hope Against Hope" |
| 1997 | Soldier of Fortune, Inc. | Sergeant Kellogue | Episode: "Genesis" |
| 1997 | Diagnosis: Murder | Metal Detector Guard | Episode: "Deadly Games" |
| 1997 | Star Trek: Voyager | Zahl | Episode: "Year of Hell" |
| 1997 | The Pretender | Captain Wright | Episode: "Over the Edge" |
| 1998 | USA High | Winnie's Dad | Episode: "Daddy's Little Girl" |
| 1998 | You Lucky Dog | Detective | Television film |
| 1998 | Holding the Baby | Copeland | Episode: "Homeward Boundaries" |
| 1998 | Sister, Sister | George Dixon | Episode: "Home Court Advantage" |
| 1998 | The Steve Harvey Show | Dr. Leland Powell | Episode: "Welcome to Bernie's" |
| 1999 | Friends | The Professor | Episode: "The One Where Joey Loses His Insurance" |
| 2000 | Miracle in Lane 2 | Soccer Coach | Television film |
| 2001 | Popular | Serious Male Judge | Episode: "The Brain Game" |
| 2001 | The Bold and the Beautiful | Dr. Craig | 8 episodes |
| 2002 | Girlfriends | Minister | Episode: "Willie or Won't He II: The Last Chapter?" |
| 2002 | Andy Richter Controls the Universe | Mr. Miller | Episode: "Little Andy in Charge" |
| 2002 | Crossing Jordan | Dick Robbins | Episode: "The Gift of Life" |
| 2002 | The Guardian | Judge | Episode: "Testimony" |
| 2002 | Frasier | Supervisor | Episode: "We Two Kings" |
| 2003 | The Parkers | Mr. Dare | Episode: "Internship" |
| 2004 | American Dreams | Reverend | Episode: "Beyond the Wire" |
| 2004 | All of Us | Minister | Episode: "It Takes Three to Tango" |
| 2004 | NYPD Blue | Proctor | Episode: "The Dead Donald" |
| 2005 | Reba | Dr. Yeager | Episode: "Diamond Jim Brady" |
| 2005 | Joan of Arcadia | Paul Brumfield | Episode: "Romancing the Joan" |
| 2005 | Joey | The Salesman | Episode: "Joey and the Fancy Sister" |
| 2005 | The Suite Life of Zack & Cody | Mr. Johnson | Episode: "Rumors" |
| 2005 | Nip/Tuck | Airline Representative | Episode: "Sal Perri" |
| 2006 | Bones | Col. Phillip Seymour Shore | Episode: "The Soldier on the Grave" |
| 2006 | The Jake Effect | Judge | Episode: "Fight School" |
| 2006 | Commander in Chief | General Mitchell | Episode: "Happy Birthday, Madam President" |
| 2006 | Desperate Housewives | Jerry the Coroner | 2 episodes |
| 2006–2007 | Shark | Judge Walker | 3 episodes |
| 2007 | General Hospital: Night Shift | Roger Winters | 4 episodes |
| 2007 | Back to You | David | Episode: "A Gentleman Always Leads" |
| 2007 | Days of Our Lives | Umar Abboud | 4 episodes |
| 2009 | Lie to Me | Male Protester | Episode: "Undercover" |
| 2009 | Raising the Bar | Judge | Episode: "Is There a Doctor in the House?" |
| 2011 | Franklin & Bash | Harley Slater | Episode: "Bro-Bono" |
| 2012 | Parks and Recreation | Dr. Lipp Nerpins | Episode: "Campaign Ad" |
| 2012 | Vegas | Porter | Episode: "(Il)Legitimate" |
| 2012 | Revenge | Officiant | Episode: "Illusion" |
| 2013 | Guys with Kids | Minister | Episode: "First Word" |
| 2014 | Modern Family | Desk Sergeant | Episode: "And One to Grow On" |
| 2014 | Dads | George | Episode: "Have a Heart... Attack!" |
| 2014 | The Young and the Restless | Justice of the Peace | 2 episodes |
| 2014 | Scandal | Senator Bryan Rich | Episode: "The State of the Union" |
| 2015 | The Last Ship | Henry | Episode: "A More Perfect Union" |
| 2015 | The Grinder | Judge McCan | Episode: "Little Mitchard No More" |
| 2017 | The Real O'Neals | Bishop | Episode: "The Real Mr. Nice Guy" |
