= Cade's County =

Television series

- Genre: Western; Action; Crime drama
- Created by: Rick Husky; Anthony Wilson
- Starring: Glenn Ford; Edgar Buchanan; Victor Campos; Taylor Lacher; Peter Ford; Betty Ann Carr
- Theme music composer: Henry Mancini
- Composers: Henry Mancini; Duane Tatro; Tom Scott
- Country of origin: United States
- Original language: English
- No. of seasons: 1
- No. of episodes: 24

Production
- Executive producer: David Gerber
- Producer: Charles Larson
- Running time: 60 mins.
- Production companies: David Gerber Productions; 20th Century-Fox Television

Original release
- Network: CBS
- Release: September 19, 1971 – April 9, 1972

Cade's County is a modern-day Western/crime drama which aired Sundays at 9:30 pm (EST) on CBS during the 1971–1972 television season. There were 24 episodes.

== Synopsis ==
Cade's County starred well-known Hollywood actor Glenn Ford as Sam Cade, the sheriff of the fictional Madrid County, a vast and sparsely populated semiarid desert area that was apparently located in the American Southwest. There was a U.S. Border Patrol Station located in the area. Sheriff Cade worked a case with Border Patrol Agents involving murder and drug smuggling on a ranch in the county located on the U.S.- Mexico border, in Episode Four - "Crisscross". The state in which it was located was never mentioned; it could have been California (where much of the location filming took place), Arizona, New Mexico or western Texas. Cade made occasional references to going to "Capitol City" for hearings and meetings. In the Cade's County Movie: "Slay Ride", Chief Deputy J.J. Jackson makes reference to the Criminal Information and Identification Lab in Austin. In Slay Ride Sheriff Cade describes Madrid County being approximately as large as Rhode Island. There is a town named Madrid, New Mexico, however, it is pronounced "MAD-rid", and is not a county seat.

Cade's character was complex and interesting, though never fully developed. He came from a socially prominent and well-to-do family in the county, had served in the U.S. Navy as a fighter pilot — there was one reference to the Korean War — and had been an FBI agent, after which he returned to Madrid County to become sheriff. His father had been sheriff until he was shot and killed. There were no references to a wife or close family in the series.

His chief deputy was J. J. Jackson, portrayed by the character actor Edgar Buchanan. While Cade had traveled the world, and had modern law enforcement training, Jackson had apparently spent most of his life and career in Madrid County. Writers avoided the stereotypical combination of "resistant-to-change veteran" and "newly hatched expert" – Jackson was a capable and competent lawman and right-hand man, Cade firmly in control but trusted by his people, who called him "Sam".

Together they fought to maintain law and order against violent miners, cattle thieves and other lawbreakers who, for the most part, would have seemed at home in Westerns set in any era. Cade usually drove a Jeep CJ-5, as many of the roads in his jurisdiction were apparently little more than tracks across the sand.

Several of the characters, including some of Cade's deputies, were Native Americans. Another deputy was played by Ford's son, Pete (also the name of his character).

After summer hiatus, Cade's County was replaced in the 1972–1973 fall TV season by the hugely successful TV series M*A*S*H.

The 94 minute Sam Cade — Marshal of Madrid was released in 1991 on VHS format, which combined footage from the episodes "Crisscross" and "A Gun for Billy". A two-part episode, Slay Ride, was released as a television feature film, occasionally broadcast by independent television stations. A 92 minute movie was prepared under the name Sam Cade that is a stitching-together of footage from the episodes "Homecoming" and "Blackout". It was shown on TV, in theaters in Europe, and available on some DVD collections.

The musical theme for the show was composed by Henry Mancini. The title music appeared in an expanded version in the album Big Screen, Little Screen.

== Cast ==
- Glenn Ford as Sheriff Sam Cade
- Edgar Buchanan as Senior Deputy J.J. Jackson
- Taylor Lacher as Arlo Pritchard
- Victor Campos as Rudy Davillo
- Peter Ford as Deputy Pete
- Sandra Ego as Joanie Little Bird
- Betty Ann Carr as Betty Ann Sundown

== Episodes ==
No.	Title	Directed by	Written by	Original release date	Filming order
1	"Homecoming"	Marvin J. Chomsky	Eric Bercovici, Cliff Gould & Jerrold L. Ludwig	September 19, 1971	F–106
Cade is about to reunite with an old friend (Darren McGavin), who has murder, rather than reminiscing, on his mind.
2	"Company Town"	Robert Day	Cliff Gould	September 26, 1971	F–101
After a murder, Cade decides to break a mine owner's (Will Geer) hold on a small town.
3	"Safe Deposit"	Reza Badiyi	Luther Davis	October 3, 1971	F–103
Bank robbers take Cade and Arlo hostage. Nora Marlowe guest stars as Miss Glaskill.
4	"Crisscross"	Richard Donner	Charles Larson & Jack Turley	October 10, 1971	F–102
A series of murders leads to a border smuggling ring run by an oil magnate (James Gregory).
5	"Violent Echo"	David Lowell Rich	Jim Byrne & Cliff Gould	October 24, 1971	F–108
After the final appeal fails, Cade re-opens the case of a man (William Windom) convicted of murder.
6	"Gray Wolf"	Alf Kjellin	Charles Larson & Clyde Ware	October 31, 1971	F–109
An unarmed Cade tracks a murderous former deputy trainee (Cameron Mitchell) into a wolf-ridden wilderness.
7	"The Armageddon Contract"	Paul Stanley	Stephen Kandel & Charles Larson	November 7, 1971	F–104
A saboteur (William Shatner) threatens to blow up a nearby atomic-missile base.
8	"The Mustangers"	Irving J. Moore	Cliff Gould & Robert M. Young	November 14, 1971	F–112
A hunter (George Maharis) helps a group of cowboys illegally capture wild horses and sell them for profit.
9	"Delegate at Large"	Marvin J. Chomsky	Cliff Gould, Charles Larson & Harold Medford	November 21, 1971	F–113
Murderous jewel thieves may have one of Cade's deputies, so the Sheriff decides to work with a Los Angeles cop (L. Q. Jones) to find the abductors.
10	"A Gun for Billy"	Richard Donner	Anthony Wilson, Rick Husky & Anthony Lawrence	November 28, 1971	F–111
A crazed young gunslinger (Bobby Darin), believing he is the reincarnation of Billy the Kid, sets his sights on Cade, his Pat Garrett. Linda Cristal guest stars.
11	"Requiem for Miss Madrid"	Joseph Pevney	Rick Husky & Charles Larson	December 12, 1971	F–107
Cade searches for the killer (Broderick Crawford) of a former beauty queen.
12	"The Alien Land"	Irving J. Moore	Jackson Gillis & Charles Larson	December 19, 1971	F–105
A ranch foreman's murder leads to a lovesick girl, her possessive father and Middle East politics.
13	"Shakedown"	Lee Madden	Warren B. Duff & Cliff Gould	January 9, 1972	F–114
In an effort to find evidence on the leader (Anthony Zerbe) of a gold smuggling operation, Cade must go undercover posing as a blackmailer.
14	"One Small Acceptable Death"	Irving J. Moore	Michael Gleason	January 16, 1972	F–115
A slain drunk's companion (David Wayne) claims he saw a famous tycoon (William Smithers) at the murder scene.
15	"The Brothers"	Alf Kjellin	Robert M. Young	January 23, 1972	F–116
Arlo's brother (Christopher Stone) plans a perfect crime.
16	"Slay Ride: Part 1"	Robert Day	Rick Husky & Anthony Wilson	January 31, 1972	F–117
After a killing, an Apache (Tony Bill) confesses readily to the crime but Sam Cade isn't convinced of his guilt.
17	"Slay Ride: Part 2"	Robert Day	Rick Husky & Anthony Wilson	February 6, 1972	F–118
A big city cop (Gerald S. O'Loughlin) joins Cade in his continuing search for a killer.
18	"Dead Past"	Lee Madden	Alvin Boretz & Cliff Gould	February 13, 1972	F–110
An archaeology professor (Simon Oakland) becomes the target of a murder plot.
19	"Inferno"	Lee Philips	Charles Larson	February 27, 1972	F–120
A son (Scott Marlowe) sets out to destroy the family business.
20	"Ragged Edge"	George Marshall	James Banning	March 5, 1972	F–121
A child gets kidnapped and can only be freed with an unusual ransom — an imprisoned drug dealer (Jack Carter).
21	"Jesse"	Marvin J. Chomsky	Richard Nelson	March 12, 1972	F–122
A woman (Barbara Rush) accused of murder finds herself trapped in a maze of circumstantial evidence. Cade tries to get at the truth.
22	"Blackout"	Richard Donner	Pat Fielder	March 19, 1972	F–124
A mobster (Edward Asner) who got out of the rackets finds himself framed for murder.
23	"The Fake"	Leo Penn	Pat Fielder	March 26, 1972	F–123
The trail of an art collector's killer (O. J. Simpson) leads to a museum director and a mobster.
24	"The Witness"	Michael O'Herlihy	Cliff Gould	April 9, 1972	F–119
An Indian chief's beliefs prevent him from giving evidence in a trapper's murder.
