= Arizona Heat (film) =

- Directed by: John G. Thomas
- Written by: Daniel M. Colmerauer
- Produced by: Michael Scordino; John G. Thomas
- Starring: Michael Parks; Denise Crosby; Hugh Farrington
- Cinematography: Howard Wexler
- Music by: Gary Stockdale
- Distributed by: Overseas FilmGroup
- Release date: 1988
- Running time: 85 minutes
- Country: United States
- Language: English

Arizona Heat is a 1988 American crime-thriller film directed by John G. Thomas and starring Michael Parks, Denise Crosby, and Hugh Farrington.

== Premise ==
A tough Arizona detective is teamed with a lesbian cop to catch a serial killer who preys on police.

== Cast ==
- Michael Parks as Detective Lt. Larry Kapinski
- Denise Crosby as Jill Andrews
- Hugh Farrington as Captain Samuels
- Ron Briskman as Toad
- Dennis O'Sullivan as Paul Murphy
- Renata Lee as Lisa
