= Carla Collins =

Canadian comedian, writer and actress (born 1965)

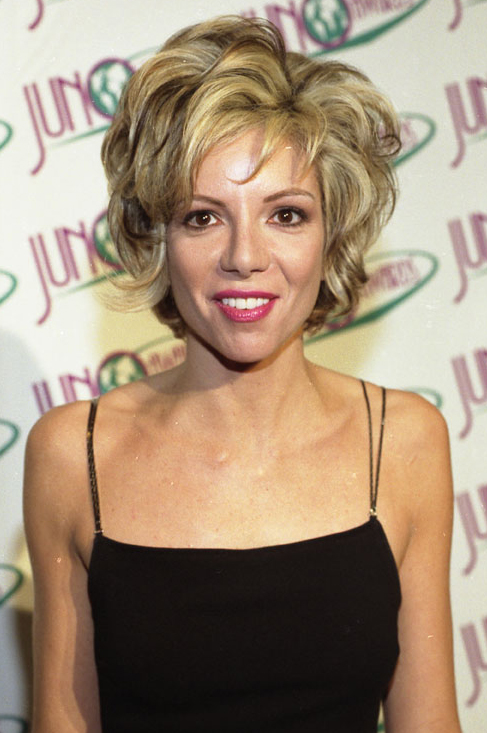
- Collins in 1999
- Born: April 30, 1965 (age 61); Sault Ste. Marie, Ontario, Canada
- Education: University of Western Ontario
- Occupations: Comedian, actress, television host, writer
- Years active: 1990–present
- Spouse(s): Jon Burnside (m. ?; div. ?) Tyrone Power Jr. (m. 2007)
- Website: http://www.carlacollins.com/

Carla Collins (born April 30, 1965) is a Canadian comedian, actress, television host, and writer.

Collins performs across North America. She has been a regular at the Laugh Factory in Los Angeles and toured with the "Hot Tamales". In January 2015, Collins was awarded with Comedian Of The Year by the Southern California Motion Picture Council, an inaugural honour created to recognize Collins's talent.

== Early life ==
Collins was born and raised in Sault Ste. Marie, Ontario, until moving to Guelph, Ontario and attending Guelph Collegiate Vocational Institute where she was Prom Queen and Valedictorian, Collins pursued her education at the Université de Franche-Comté in France and the University of Western Ontario.

== 1990s ==
She joined The Weather Network in 1990 as an on-air host, and subsequently moved to CFTO to host Eye on Toronto. In 1995, she began hosting Baton Broadcastings's Entertainment Now, which she cohosted with Dan Duran. She also hosted the Canadian variety series Sonic Temple and the sketch comedy series Chez Carla. In 1998, Collins played an anchorwoman in Universal Soldier II: Brothers in Arms and Donna Jean in When Husbands Cheat.

Earlier in her career, she was a morning radio personality on Toronto's Mix 99.9 from 1992 to 1994, co-hosting with Tom Rivers along with Larry Fedoruk. Rivers left in 1993 and Fedoruk and Collins continued as a duo. She returned from 2001 to 2003. For the latter stint, following a short period co-hosting with Steve Anthony who then moved to afternoon drive time, Collins became the first woman in Canada to be billed as the sole regular host of a morning radio show on a commercial station in a major media market, as opposed to co-hosting with one or more men.

== 2000s ==
Collins had her first solo stand-up special, The Wonder Bra Years, on The Comedy Network in 2001. It was one of the highest rated in the Comedy Now series.

Collins starred in 50 episodes of Paradise Falls a soap opera on Showcase Television as Rusty Sinclair (2001). She also appeared in: Deep in the City as a Sex-Shop Owner (2000), The Caveman's Valentine (2001), Degrassi: The Next Generation as herself (2002), two episodes of Doc as Felicia Brand (2002–2003), Recipe for Murder as a Glam Reporter (2002), Tracker as Dr. Janet Sullivann (2002), and Show Me Yours as Tammy (2005).

In 2003, she began to lend her voice to the PBS animated show Cyberchase as Erica Ram, a reporter who reports on events in Cyberspace.

Collins was a writer, star and host of Chez Carla (2000), Sonic Temple (2001), 2 Smart Blondes (2003) and E-Now (1995).

In 2006 Carla teamed up with producer Frank Sicoli for an unscripted television sitcom titled The Visionary Position. This series (released on DVD) is described as Curb Your Enthusiasm meets Sex and the City meets Bewitched. Collins says, "I prefer to think of it as The Ghost Whisperer on crack."

In 2006, she workshopped a one-woman show called The Visionary Position in Toronto and Los Angeles.

She is also a freelance writer for Inside Entertainment.

In 2007, Collins married Tyrone Power Jr., an actor from the United States. She was previously married to Jon Burnside.

Collins's reality show Carlawood debuted on TVtropolis in April 2009. The show follows her attempt to find work after her move to Hollywood, and satirizes reality shows.

== 2010s ==
Collins filmed season two of her docu-soap/comedy Carlawood, and worked on the movie The Hack, a comedy/horror film in which she stars as a comedian who kills other performers for their material.

She also completed her first book "Angels, Vampires and Douche Bags", published by Burman Books.

She also lent her voice to a special from the hit Canadian animated series, Total Drama, in its second season, Total Drama Action's special, "Celebrity Manhunt's Total Drama Action Reunion Special", as the host of the show-within-a-show, Celebrity Manhunt, Blaineley. Then she lent her voice for the next season in Total Drama World Tour, once again playing Blaineley, the co-host of Total Drama Aftermath, and then she became a late-coming contestant that same season and ending in either seventh or sixth place. This was her first voice acting role, a role which also required her to sing.

== 2020s ==
After performing at various locations doing standup comedy, Collins found that many venues were closed due to the COVID-19 pandemic. During that time, she performed some "Quarantine Queen" comedy programs on Facebook and began streaming "Comedic Meditation" from Los Angeles, at no charge to the public; she also offered private sessions. By autumn 2020 some venues were open and she performed at the El Mocambo in Toronto and began streaming her Meditation program in Canada, again free of charge.

A September 2020 article added that Collins's program "Carlawood" was streaming on Amazon Prime and she also performed on SiriusXM. She was waiting to film a comedy special produced by David Steinberg and she was also producing "Hump Day Howl" a monthly streaming program from the Whitefire Theatre.
