= John G. Thomas =

American filmmaker (born 1948)

- Born: January 19, 1948 (age 78); United States
- Occupations: Producer, film director, writer, film editor
- Children: 2

John G. Thomas (born January 19, 1948) is an American filmmaker. He has been in the film and television business for over 30 years.

A graduate of the USC Film School in production plus a Masters in screenwriting, he has produced and directed dozens of documentaries, feature films and commercials. Among his feature credits are such films as Tin Man, Arizona Heat, Banzai Runner, Healer and most recently, Hamal 18.

== Career ==
=== Early career ===
Thomas made 37 documentaries, shorts, and television programs on a varied range of subjects such as aviation, genetic engineering, solar energy, and bluegrass music. He also photographed a land speed record attempt by Kitty O'Neil.

His first feature, Tin Man (1983), is the story of a deaf computer genius (Timothy Bottoms) who invents a computer which allows him to speak. The film was received with much enthusiasm and earned the title of Official U.S. entry at the San Sebastian International Film Festival. Thomas' next feature, Banzai Runner (1987), starring Dean Stockwell, centers around the death of a cop mixed up in a race involving a group of wealthy drivers and custom high-speed cars on a deserted desert highway. Banzai Runner went on to become the "…top selling (non-studio) video in the first year of its release." according to Variety. The next film done by Thomas was Arizona Heat (1988), a film crossing cultural boundaries by pairing a tough cop with a lesbian cop in their mutual pursuit of a serial killer. Arizona Heat was also greatly successful.

=== Breaking from film ===
Tired from the grind of production, Thomas dropped out of filmmaking for three years. During this, Thomas faced emotional difficulties of having to put his mother into a rest home. The experience led to the eventual production of his next film, Healer (1994). A true story that chronicles the bizarre and often humorous lives of two paramedics in a retirement town. Earning the spot of opening night selection at the Santa Barbara International Film Festival, the films stars such actors as Tyrone Power Jr., David McCallum, Delane Matthews, and Turhan Bey. Tobey Maguire also makes an appearance in the film.

Thomas then took another break and worked in Los Angeles at the Department of Children Protection Services. Contracted by IBM, Thomas witnessed juvenile justice and observed many cases of child abuse. For his work, he received a Commendation from the Los Angeles County Board of Supervisors. Thomas felt enriched by this experience and was inspired to once again work in film. Immediately attracted to the script, Thomas created his next film Hamal 18. This story follows a detective as he searches for a pedophile on the internet.

Aside from creating films, Thomas also programmed specialized budgeting software for feature films, called Easy Budget. This program, developed from Thomas' own production experience, is sold all across the world.

=== Recent years ===
Thomas writes scripts for distributors and production companies as a script doctor. Thomas' writing work extends from The Los Angeles Times and The Hollywood Reporter, to VOA and NPR.

Thomas published his first book "Making the Tin Man: How I Made My First Feature Film." This first-hand account records the trials and tribulations Thomas experienced when making his first feature film.

Thomas teaches filmmaking techniques at several colleges, universities, and local high schools. Most recently, Thomas acquired his master's degree in screenwriting, and is a recognized expert in the area of internet child safety.

== Works ==
Producer:

- Hamal 18 (2004)
- Healer (1994)
- Caged in Paradiso (1990)
- Arizona Heat (1988)
- Banzai Runner (1987)
- Tin Man (1983)

Director:

- Hamal 18 (2004)
- Healer (1994)
- Arizona Heat (1988)
- Banzai Runner (1987)
- Tin Man (1983)

Editor:

- Hamal 18 (2004)

Writer:

- Banzai Runner (1987)
