= Hugh Farrington =

American actor

- Born: July 5, 1934; Paris, Arkansas, United States
- Died: January 15, 2006 (aged 71); Arkansas, United States
- Occupation: Actor

Hugh Farrington (July 5, 1934 – January 15, 2006) was an American actor best known for his recurring role as Detective Lieutenant Pete O'Brien on the television series T. J. Hooker. Farrington was born Hubert Houston Smith on July 5, 1934 in Paris, Arkansas to John B Smith and Fern Smith (Freeman). He was commissioned in the United States Navy and was slated to fly the Lockheed P-2 Neptune before being severely injured in an aviation mishap in San Diego, CA in 1957, limiting him to a wheelchair for the remainder of his life. Through much of the 1960s and 1970s, Farrington was treated for spinal cord injuries at the VA hospital in Long Beach, California while also holding jobs as a radio broadcaster and real estate agent until he starting his acting career in the late 1970s.

Farrington was also known for such films and television series The Terminator, Arizona Heat, Caged Fury, Quincy, M.E., The Incredible Hulk (1978 TV series), Airwolf, The Golden Girls and Coming Home.

== Filmography ==
Year	Title	Role	Notes
1978	Coming Home	Himself – At Hospital No. 74	
1984	The Terminator	Customer No. 3	
1988	Arizona Heat	Captain Samuels	
1990	Caged Fury	Det. Dan Elston	
1990	The Golden Girls	Ted	Episode: "Stand By Your Man"
