= Richard France (writer) =

American dramatist

Richard France (born Richard Zagami, May 5, 1936) is an American playwright, author, actor, and film and drama critic. He is a recognized authority on the stage work of American filmmaker Orson Welles. His publication, The Theatre of Orson Welles, which received a CHOICE Outstanding Academic Book Award in 1979, has been called "a landmark study" and has been translated into Japanese. His 1990 companion volume, Orson Welles on Shakespeare has been praised by Welles critics and biographers.

== Early life and education ==
Richard France was born Richard Zagami in Boston, Massachusetts, son of N. Roy Zagami, a U.S. Army officer, and Rita (Foster) Zagami. His father's military postings led France to spend nearly half of his early years abroad: in Japan (1947–49), Australia (1949–50), and Germany (1953–57).

France dropped out of high school in 1955 in Kaiserslauten and returned to the United States, where he began working at odd jobs, including apprentice trophy maker, radio announcer, and encyclopedia salesman. The resonant, expressive voice that would make France a sought-after narrator and voice-over performer was already evident when he found employment in the mail room at NBC Studios, and was chosen to participate in the NBC Radio Workshop, whose members were coached and mentored by many of the network's distinguished announcing staff.

While never attending college at the undergraduate level, France was admitted to the Yale School of Drama as a Special Fellow in Playwriting (1964–66). From there, he went on to earn an M.F.A. in Dramatic Writing (1970) and a Ph.D. in Theatre History/Dramatic Literature (1973) from Carnegie-Mellon University.

== Career ==
=== Beginnings ===
While serving as a psychiatric aide in New York (1958–59), France met Czechoslovak playwright Mirko Tůma, a survivor of the Nazi concentration camp Terezin. Tůma, who had not previously written in English, suggested that they collaborate on a play, with France's native fluency complementing Tůma's playwriting skills. The Walk (later retitled Don't You Know It's Raining?) received four Broadway options between 1960 and 1971 and premiered at the Dallas Theatre Center, in cooperation with the Rockefeller-funded Office for Advanced Drama Research, in August 1970.

=== Playwriting and production ===
In the spring of 1960 France left New York City for San Francisco, California. He would remain there for four years, writing fourteen plays whose central characters, "eccentric outsiders … locked in open conflict with the established order, which eventually destroys them", would reappear in his later work. His one-act play, The Image of Elmo Doyle, premiered at the Yale School of Drama in October 1964 and was restaged by the Institute of Advanced Studies in Theatre Arts in New York the following June. In 1970, the distinguished Japanese playwright-scholar, Masakazu Yamazaki, translated the play for the Walnut Theatre in Kyoto. (Yamazaki would subsequently translate The Theatre of Orson Welles for the publisher Kodansha.) Nine years later, The Image of Elmo Doyle would be included in The Best Short Plays of 1979.

In 1965, France received writing grants from the Shubert and Golden foundations, then left Yale to become resident playwright at the University of Pittsburgh. He also received grants from the Ford and Rockefeller foundations. That year also saw the production of Envoys, a series of 106 haiku and his only verse drama, which premiered at the Yale School of Drama and would be performed as a ballet at Venice's College of Music in 1997.

Upon obtaining his doctorate from Carnegie-Mellon University in 1972, France left Pittsburgh for San Francisco as a guest of the American Theatre Association. His outspokenness in moderating a playwrighting session at the ATA convention led Forum magazine to feature him in an article in its August 16, 1972 issue, titled "France: Criticizing the Critics".

His docudrama, Station J, received the support of the late Senator Daniel K. Inouye, enabling France to obtain previously withheld government documents. It was inspired by France's childhood years in Japan and his experiences in San Francisco in the early 1960s. The play, which would earn France a Silver PEN Award for Playwriting and his second NEA Creative Writing Prize, takes the evacuation and internment of Japanese Americans during the Second World War as a jumping-off point for a nuanced exploration of the nature of democracy and its often problematic on-the-ground implementation.

Perhaps France's most popular play, measured by number of performances, is one of the three he wrote for children, and a marked departure from his oeuvre: The Magic Shop, which by 1980 had been performed internationally by over 150 theater groups.

In 2006, his play, Obediently Yours, Orson Welles, premiered at the Théâtre Marigny in Paris, France, and has since been translated into several languages. The Spanish production, which began in Barcelone in 2008, toured for over two years, before its conclusion at the Teatro Bellas Artes in November 2010. Also in 2010, a second French-language production opened at the Atelier Théâtre Jean Vilar in Louvain-la-Neuve (where it played as Moi, Orson Welles et Don Quichotte, in a translation written by its star, Armand Delcampe). The Spanish-language text, Su seguro servidor, Orson Welles, was one of three finalists for the 2009 Premios Max Award and published by Arola Editions.

In 2011, it was featured as one of three plays selected by Oberon Books (London) for its anthology Hollywood Legends: 'Live' On Stage, with an introduction by Simon Callow.

In addition to its multiple translations and international stagings, Obediently Yours, Orson Welles and actor José María (Josep Maria) Pou's enactment of Welles in Barcelona — where the play's Spanish translation, adapted and directed by film scholar, professor and screenwriter Esteve Riambau for Spanish- and Castilian-speaking lands as Su seguro servidor, Orson Welles, premiered at the Theatre Romea on 30 June 2008 as part of the Festival Grec — were the subject of the feature-length documentary Màscares (Masks, 2009), which premiered at the San Sebastian Film Festival. The film follows Pou as he prepares to take on the title role in Obediently Yours …. It received several Broadway options in 1997-98.

In late 2019, his monodrama, “Barabbas" (also titled "The Blind"), was staged by Theatre Shine in the Auroville township of India as part of an international virtual theatre festival. As “The Blind”, it was workshopped in Munich, Germany, to facilitate an operatic version. This version, which combined the work with Franz Schubert’s unfinished oratorio Lazarus, premiered in October 2025 and was directed by Martina Veh. The Spanish-language version of Barabbas opened in 2024 at the Teatros del Canal in Madrid and was restaged at the Merida Festival that summer.

Other works in France's playwriting canon include:

- Pulse and Glare, 1962, the California Club, San Francisco, California
- The First Word and the Last, Open Space Theatre Workshop, London (August 1968) and Mikery Theatre, Amsterdam (October 1968)
- Don't You Know It's Raining, Dallas Theatre Center, Dallas, Texas ( August 1970); four Broadway options (1960–71)
- A Day in the Life, for which France received his first National Endowment for the Arts (NEA) Creative Writing Prize, Salt City Playhouse, Syracuse, New York, 1974, Midwest Playwrights Lab, 1976, and Actors Alley Theatre, Los Angeles, California, 1978
- An End in Sight, No Smoking Playhouse, New York City, 1981

Several of France's plays have also been published. They include:

- The Magic Shop and Fathers and Sons, Baker's Plays, 1972
- The Adventure of the Dying Detective, I.E. Clark Publications, 1974
- The First Word and the Last, I.E. Clark Publications, 1974
- The Image of Elmo Doyle, Best Short Plays, 1979 (Chicago: Dramatic Publishing Company, 1977; Chilton Books, Radnor, PA 1979)
- One Day in the Life of Ivan Denisovich, Baker's Plays, 1974
- The Image of Elmo Doyle, Chilton/Haynes, 1979
- Feathertop, Baker's Plays, 1979. In September 1998, Act 1 was staged in opera workshop presentations at University of Memphis, TN, USA, and in Halifax, Nova Scotia, by composer Emanuel Serra.
- Station J, Irvington Publishers, 1982
- Don't You Know It's Raining, Arion Press, 1984
- An End in Sight, Arion Press, 1989
- Obediently Yours, Orson Welles, Oberon Books, 2011

=== Published essays ===
France's published essays include:

- "The 'Voodoo' Macbeth of Orson Welles," Yale Theatre magazine, New York, Vol. 5, No. 3 (Spring 1975), pp. 66–78; reprinted in Scena magazine, Yugoslavia, Vol. 1, No. 3 (May 1982), pp. 73–81
- "The Shoemaker's Holiday at the Mercury Theatre" (Theatre Survey, Vol. 16, No. 2 (November 1975), pp. 150–164
- The Theatre of Orson Welles, printed in its entirety in Shingeki magazine, Vols. 1-9 (December 1979 to March 1981), Tokyo
- "Virgil Thomson/Gertrude Stein: A Correspondence," Theatre History Studies, Vol. 6, No. 1 (June 1986), pp. 72–86
- " 'Hearts of Age': Orson Welles' First Film," FILM: The Monthly Magazine of the British Federation of Film Societies, No. 23 (February 1975), pp. 5–7; and Films in Review, Vol. 11, No. 2 (August–September 1987), pp. 403–407
- "Citizen Will," American Theatre magazine, Vol. 5, No. 7 (October 1988), pages 44–49
- "Louis B. Mayer," "John Wayne" and "Orson Welles," entries in The Reader's Companion to American History (Boston, Houghton-Mifflin, 1991)
- "Early Orson: The Years Before Citizen Kane," Nickel Odeon magazine (Spain), No. 16 (December 1999), pp. 158–168
- "Orson Welles' Anti-Fascist Production of Julius Caesar," Forum Modernes Theater (Germany), November 2000, pp. 145–158

=== Film and television ===
France has appeared in several films, beginning as a zombie (uncredited) in George A. Romero's original Night of the Living Dead (1968) and including, among others, as Dr. Watts in Romero's The Crazies (1973), as Dr. Millard Rausch in the director's Dawn of the Dead (1978), and as a white slaver in Charles Ludlam's The Sorrows of Dolores (1986). He also appeared as the therapist in Scott B and Beth B's stylish low-budget 1982 noir film Vortex, which premiered at the Lincoln Center Film Festival, and as the brute in Ludlum's 16mm short Museum of Wax (1987), having been a stage actor in the company's New York home from 1980–81.

From 1969-73, France was a film and drama critic for Newsroom on WQED-TV, the PBS affiliate in Pittsburgh, Pennsylvania, also becoming producer for the station's Jewel Walker's Mime Circus in 1972.

In 1996, France was a scholarly consultant for, and was featured as the Welles authority in the documentary film, The Battle Over Citizen Kane, which was nominated for an Academy Award. Subsequently, it aired on the PBS series The American Experience. His other work for PBS includes Jewel Walker's Mime Circus (1973), which he co-produced, and Southern Odyssey, on which he worked as a writer and narrator.

France was also one of the scholarly consultants for the 2023 Welles documentary, American: An Odyssey to 1947, by filmmaker Danny Wu.

=== Academic work ===
In the 1970s, France was a college professor and chairman of the theater department at Lawrence University in Appleton, Wisconsin. Thereafter, he taught on a visiting or adjunct basis at Brown University (Rhode Island), Hunter College (New York), the University of Southern California, the University of Massachusetts Boston and other universities.
