= Maximo Munzi =

- Born: Maximo Felipe Munzi; July 26, 1957; Buenos Aires, Argentina
- Died: December 16, 2014 (aged 57); Los Angeles, California, US
- Occupation: Cinematographer

Maximo Felipe Munzi (26 July 1957 – 16 December 2014) was an Argentine-born cinematographer, whose career spanned 30 years and included 104 films. He died of pancreatic cancer in Los Angeles on 16 December 2014, aged 57.

== Partial filmography ==
- Expecting a Miracle (2009)
- The Storm (miniseries) (2009)
- Ring of Death (2008)
- Avenging Angel (2007)
- Sacrifices of the Heart (2007)
- Just Desserts (2004)
- Momentum (2003)
- Across the Line (2000)
- Chain of Command (2000)
- Judgment Day (1999)
- Healer (1994)
- Miami Connection (1987)
