= The Crazies (1973 film) =

1973 American science fiction horror film written and directed by George A. Romero

- Theatrical release poster
- Directed by: George A. Romero
- Screenplay by: George A. Romero
- Based on: The Mad People by Paul McCollough
- Produced by: A.C. Croft; Lee Hessel
- Starring: Lane Carroll; W.G. McMillan; Harold Wayne Jones; Lloyd Hollar; Lynn Lowry; Richard Liberty
- Cinematography: S. William Hinzman
- Edited by: George A. Romero
- Music by: Bruce Roberts
- Production company: Pittsburgh Films
- Distributed by: Cambist Films
- Release date: March 16, 1973
- Running time: 103 minutes
- Language: English
- Budget: $275,000
- Box office: $143,784

The Crazies (also known as Code Name: Trixie) is a 1973 American science fiction horror film written and directed by George A. Romero. It stars Lane Carroll, Will McMillan, and Harold Wayne Jones as residents of a small American town that accidentally become afflicted by a military biological weapon. Filmed in Evans City in Western Pennsylvania, The Crazies was a box office failure upon release. A remake of the film was released in 2010.

== Plot ==
In Evans City, Pennsylvania, a man kills his wife and burns down his farmhouse. Firefighters David and Clank—both Vietnam War veterans—are called to the scene. David's pregnant girlfriend, a nurse named Judy, is called to the office of Dr. Brookmyre, where the two children of the arsonist are being treated for burns.

Heavily armed U.S. troops led by Major Ryder take over Dr. Brookmyre's office. Days earlier, an Army plane carrying a bioweapon had crash-landed near the town, infecting the water supply with a virus code-named "Trixie," which is highly contagious and causes victims to either die or become hysterical and homicidally insane.

Government officials send Colonel Peckem and Dr. Watts, who worked on the creation of the virus, to Evans City to contain the virus and work towards a cure. Martial law is declared in Evans City and a quarantine is placed on the town. Army soldiers forcibly move the townspeople into a high school, rousting many from their homes, and shoot anyone attempting to escape. Bombers armed with nuclear weapons are dispatched to destroy the town if necessary.

David, Judy, Clank, teenager Kathy Fulton, and her father Artie try to find a way to escape the town. After spending the night hiding in a country club, the group attempts to escape through the nearby woods, eluding soldiers both on the ground and in an overhead helicopter. They overpower several soldiers in a house. One of the soldiers discloses what he knows about the virus to David, but when one of the soldiers reaches for his gun, Clank opens fire and kills the soldiers. David tells Judy about what he knows about the virus and that Kathy, Artie, and probably Clank are infected.

After Clank beats him for attempting to have sex with Kathy, Artie hangs himself. Kathy wanders outside and is killed by soldiers. Realizing he is infected, Clank kills several soldiers to give David and Judy time to escape. He is then shot and killed. The next night, Judy, now visibly infected, is killed by armed civilians. Angry and frightened, David surrenders to the military. After being taken into custody, David eventually realizes that he is immune to the virus, but he keeps the knowledge to himself.

Dr. Watts develops a potential cure for the virus but when he tries to take samples to Peckem and Ryder, he is killed and the samples are destroyed in a stampede of infected townspeople breaking free from quarantine. Depressed and distraught by his experiences in Evans City, Colonel Peckem is ordered to relocate to Louisville, where symptoms of the virus have been reported.

== Cast ==
- Lane Carroll as Judy
- Will McMillan as David
- Harold Wayne Jones as Clank
- Lloyd Hollar as Colonel Peckem
- Lynn Lowry as Kathy
- Richard Liberty as Artie
- Richard France as Dr. Watts
- Harry Spillman as Major Ryder
- Will Disney as Dr. Brookmyre
- Edith Bell as Lab Technician
- Leland Starnes as Shelby
- Bill Thunhurst as Brubaker
- A.C. McDonald as General Bowen
- Robert J. McCully as Hawks
- Robert Karlowsky as Sheriff Cooper
- Ned Schmidtke as Sergeant Tragesser
- Tony Scott as Deputy Shade
- Roy Cheverie as Army Doctor
- Jack Zaharia as Priest
- Bill Hinzman as Man in Infirmary & Crazie shooting at the doctor's office
- Dwayne "Dub" Bailey, Helicopter pilot

== Production ==
According to Romero, this project began life with Paul McCollough, who authored a screenplay entitled The Mad People. The script dealt with a military bioweapon that was accidentally released into a small town, with the military subsequently trying to cover up the incident and the townspeople revolting. Romero revealed that the military subplot was only featured in the first act of the script, and the rest of the film focused on the survivors and their attempts to cope with what was happening. The director called McCollough's script "very existential and heady".

The screenplay was read by Lee Hessel, a producer who owned Cambist Films and with whom Romero had previously worked on There's Always Vanilla. Hessel expressed interest in it and offered to finance it as Romero's next film, but only if the director would be willing to rewrite McCollough's screenplay to focus on what Hessel considered the most interesting ingredient of the story, namely the military takeover of the town, which occurred in the first 10 to 20 pages. Romero agreed and rewrote the script, and he was given a budget of approximately $270,000.

The film was shot in and around Evans City and Zelienople, both small towns in Pennsylvania about 30 miles north of Pittsburgh. The school featured in the movie is the local high school and the lockers are still the same blue they are in the movie. Romero has spoken of how the majority of people in the towns were very cooperative and happy to help with the production.

The closing credits song, "Heaven Help Us", performed by Beverly Bremers, was the first recorded song written by Melissa Manchester with lyricist Carole Bayer Sager.

== Reception ==
=== Box office ===
The film did not have a wide release, instead playing in a limited number of theaters before opening in a different market. Romero later said that he felt the major reason The Crazies failed at the box office was due to poor distribution. He stated that Hessel made a true attempt to adequately market the film, including releasing it under a variety of titles in different parts of the country, but that it never managed to catch the public's eye.

=== Critical reception ===
On the review aggregator website Rotten Tomatoes, The Crazies holds an approval rating of 68% based on 28 reviews. The website's critical consensus reads, "The Crazies isn't top-shelf Romero, but its blend of genre thrills and social subtext should still be enough to satisfy discerning horror fans." On Metacritic, it has a weighted average score of 63 out of 100, based on 6 critic reviews, indicating "generally favorable reviews".

=== Home media ===
On February 23, 2010, the film was released on Blu-ray by Blue Underground, the same company who first issued a DVD release on April 29, 2003. It was later re-released with a new 4K restoration by Arrow Video as part of a boxset entitled George A. Romero: Between Night and Dawn. It was later released separately on March 13, 2018.

== See also ==
- The Crazies (2010 film)
- List of American films of 1973
