= Healer (film) =

- Directed by: John G. Thomas
- Written by: Russ Reina
- Produced by: John G. Thomas
- Starring: Tyrone Power Jr. Tobey Maguire; John Johnston; Turhan Bey; DeLane Matthews; David McCallum
- Cinematography: Maximo Munzi
- Music by: Kamen Dranduski; Willy Kazasian
- Release date: 1994
- Running time: 106 minutes
- Country: United States
- Language: English

Healer is a 1994 American dramatic film starring Tyrone Power Jr., Tobey Maguire, David McCallum, John Johnston, Turhan Bey, DeLane Matthews and directed by John G. Thomas.

== Plot ==
An ex-con has just been paroled to a work-release program where he must work off his final year as an ambulance Emergency Medical Technician in the retirement resort, Seabreeze. David McCallum plays a comedic role as the "Jackal" an opportunistic drifter who uses the emergency system as a personal taxi service to allow him to feed his drug habit and get out of trouble.

== Cast ==
Turhan Bey came out of an over forty year absence from film acting to play an elderly man confined to a nursing home who provides the main character reason to carry on in an incredibly demanding job. This was David McCallum's penultimate on-screen film role. Tobey Maguire had one of his earliest roles as a stoned teenager in a car wreck. The screenplay was written by Russ Reina, based on his personal experience as a paramedic. Cinematography was by Maximo Munzi, with editing by Dann Cahn and music by Kamen Dranduski and Willy Kazasian. The film had its premiere at the Santa Barbara International Film Festival on March 4, 1994. Variety reviewed the film at its festival premiere, describing the script as "schematic" and drawing on "all-too-obvious contrasts between children who neglect their aging parents and those who sacrifice themselves completely to the cause," while crediting David McCallum's Jackal character as providing effective comic relief in "an otherwise stale film."

=== Main cast ===
- Tyrone Power Jr. as Nickel (credited as Tyrone Power)
- John R. Johnston as Brent (credited as John R. Johnson)
- Turhan Bey as Igor Vostovich
- DeLane Matthews as Francie
- David McCallum as The Jackal
- Lee Patterson as Sergeant Gaylor

=== Supporting cast ===
- Tobey Maguire as Teenager
- Jeanne Stawiarski as Waitress (uncredited)
