= The Hanoi Hilton (film) =

1987 American film directed by Lionel Chetwynd

- Theatrical release poster
- Directed by: Lionel Chetwynd
- Written by: Lionel Chetwynd
- Produced by: Yoram Globus; Menahem Golan
- Starring: Michael Moriarty; Jeffrey Jones; Paul Le Mat; Stephen Davies; Lawrence Pressman; Aki Aleong; Gloria Carlin; John Diehl; Rick Fitts; David Soul
- Cinematography: Mark Irwin
- Edited by: Penelope Shaw
- Music by: Jimmy Webb
- Distributed by: Cannon Film Distributors
- Release date: March 27, 1987
- Running time: 125 minutes
- Country: United States
- Languages: English, Vietnamese, French, Spanish
- Budget: $5 million
- Box office: $760,000

The Hanoi Hilton is a 1987 war film which focuses on the experiences of U.S. prisoners of war who were held in the infamous Hoa Lo Prison in Hanoi during the 1960s and 1970s and the story is told from their perspectives. It was directed by Lionel Chetwynd, and stars Michael Moriarty, Ken Wright and Paul Le Mat. Music was done by Jimmy Webb.

The film portrays fictional characters, not specific American POWs. It earned less than $1 million in its initial theatrical release, but a Warner Home Video VHS release gained a cult following, especially among veterans.

A DVD release of the film had been anticipated for some time in 2008, with the package to include a new interview with former POW and 2008 presidential candidate John McCain. However, the film's release was suspended by Warner Bros. when he became the Republican Party nominee. The week following the 2008 United States presidential election, Warner Bros. went ahead with the DVD release.

== Plot ==
The film opens to LCDR Patrick Michael Williamson being interviewed by a journalist aboard an aircraft carrier, discussing the current conflict in Vietnam. As the opening credits roll, the film pivots to Williamson’s aircraft, along with his squadron, launching from the carrier on an air raid over North Vietnam. Williamson and his RIO, Mason, are forced to eject after their aircraft takes fire, and both land in the countryside. Williamson is uninjured, but Mason suffers a major leg injury during the ejection and cannot walk. Within minutes they are met by armed local civilians. Unable to stand when the civilians order him to, Mason is killed. Williamson is ordered away and later arrives at Hoa Lo Prison in Hanoi. He is introduced to the camp commandant, Major Ngo Doc, who begins to ask Williamson a series of questions. Ngo Doc is disappointed in Williamson’s refusal to provide any information beyond his name, rank and service number, and abruptly has him taken away for an extended period of isolation. Williamson is then taken to his cell where he begins his period of solitary confinement.

Williamson remains isolated for nearly a year, and is met one morning by Ngo Doc at a latrine visit. Ngo Doc advises him his period of isolation has ended sooner than he first ordered, and Williamson is taken to a cell with three other prisoners.

The film gradually introduces other officers who become prisoners of the camp, and the inhumane conditions they are faced with when they refuse to bend to the will of their captors. Prisoners are subject to extensive physical and psychological torture, starvation and isolation, all aimed at breaking their will. This treatment continues over the course of several years.

Following a series of events, including the failed Son Tay prison camp rescue, the bombing of Hanoi, and the death of Ho Chi Minh, the prisoners are gathered in the open area of the prison compound, uncertain of what is to follow. Ngo Doc advises Williamson and his men they can expect much improved conditions from that point on. Ngo Doc also tells them he has been reassigned from the prison. The prisoners are consolidated into shared quarters for the final months of their confinement. In early 1973, the prisoners are readied at an air field in North Vietnam, where they witness an arriving United States Air Force C-141, which they will soon board for their journey home.

== Cast ==
- Michael Moriarty as LCDR Williamson
- John Edwin Shaw as Mason
- Ken Wright as Kennedy
- Paul Le Mat as Earl Hubman
- David Soul as Major Oldham
- Stephen Davies as Captain Robert Miles
- Lawrence Pressman as Colonel Cathcart
- Doug Savant as Ashby
- David Anthony Smith as Gregory
- Jeffrey Jones as Major Fischer
- John Vargas as Oliviera
- Rick Fitts as Captain Turner
- John Diehl as Murphy
- Jesse Dabson as Rasmussen
- Bruce Fairbairn as Shavik
- James Acheson as Cummins
- Aki Aleong as Major Ngo Doc
- Gary Guidinger as Raymond
- Mark Kemble as Jesse

== Reception ==
On Metacritic, the film has a weighted average score of 32 out of 100, based on 10 critics, indicating "generally unfavorable reviews".
