= Betty Ann Carr =

American actress

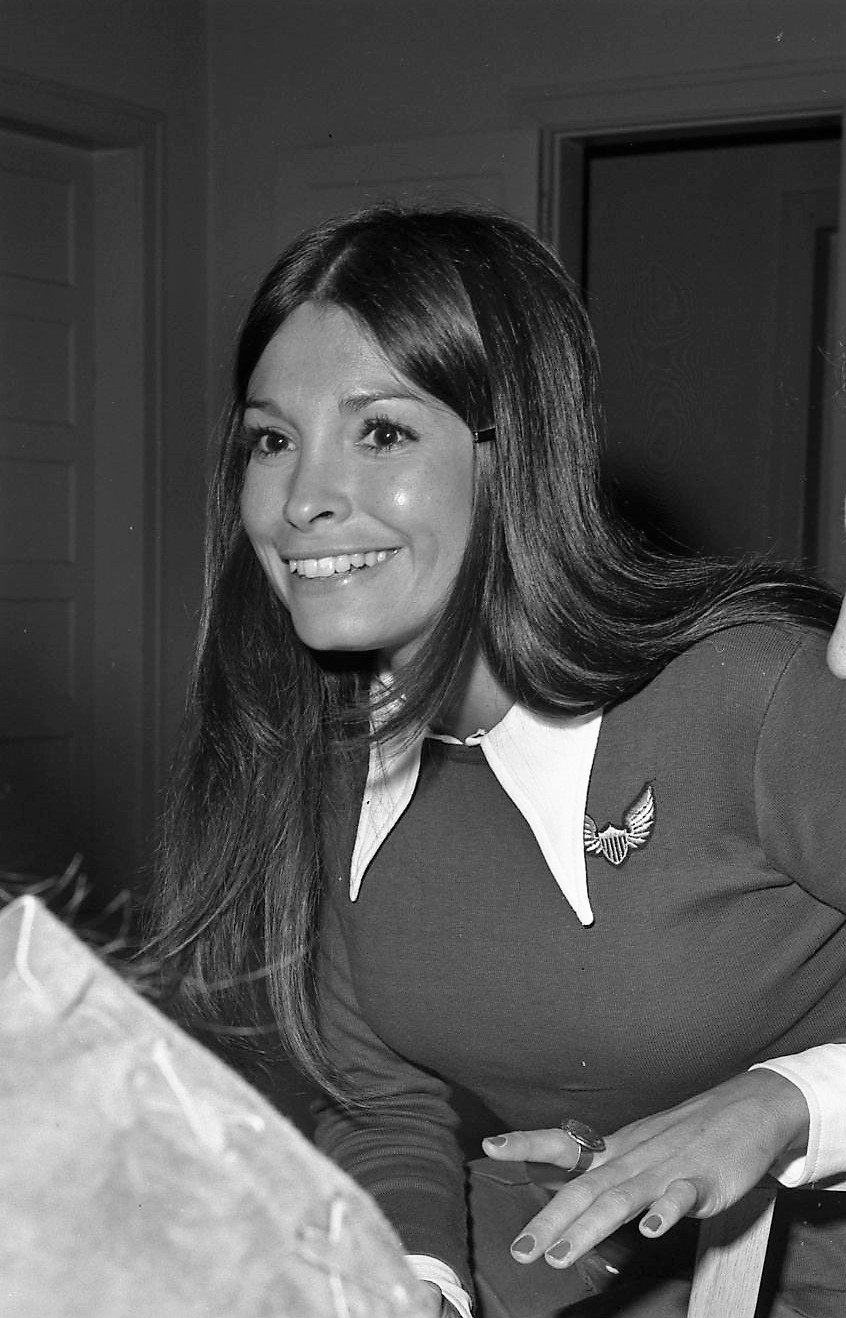
- Carr in 1971
- Born: Betty Ann Brown; September 6, 1942; Joplin, Missouri, United States
- Years active: 1972–1985
- Spouse: Tom Carr

Betty Ann Carr (born September 6, 1942) was an American actress of Native American ancestry, musician, composer and film editor best known for her television work.

== Early life ==
Carr was born to William Raymond and Helen Marie Brown. Her heritage is one-half Cherokee and one-half French. She is the oldest of six children. Betty was raised on a small farm in Asbury, Missouri, outside Joplin, Missouri and according to the actress, grew up in a poor family, saying: "We were poor, but so was everybody else, so I didn't think about that. She said, "We were raised without electricity in our home. We used coal oil for cooking and lighting and did without running water, indoor plumbing or telephones."

Despite interests in music as a child, Carr studied Drama at San Diego State University, earning a master's degree in dramatics.

Her siblings are Perry, James, Susan, Benny, Kay Brown.

== Career ==
Carr started her career by appearing as a dancer in the party scenes on Rowan & Martin's Laugh-In. Her first prominent acting role came in 1971, when she replaced actress Sandra Ego as Betty Ann Sundown in the western series Cade's County until 1972. Besides appearing in the series, she taught acting skills to Native American actors at Jay Silverheels's drama school in the San Fernando Valley. On this work, she commented in a 1973 interview:

"Indians never were schooled in drama. If we want good actors we must begin by training the young; so I teach kids, 18 and under. For a while we had a busload of students from 12 to 16 coming in weekly from the Sherman Institute, but that stopped when the Institute ran out of money to pay the driver."

Carr, however, did not consider herself as an 'Indian actress' until casting directors began rejecting her at auditions because she looked "too ethnic" or "too dark" for non-Native American parts. Carr is probably best remembered for appearing as Monica Bell in the daytime soap opera Return to Peyton Place, for which she flew daily from San Diego to Los Angeles to film. Carr achieved some fame with the role, which she first played in May 1973, and was featured in several daytime-oriented magazines. She also composed songs for musicians and edited a Native American film.

Following the show's cancellation, Carr went on to guest star in several TV series and was active as an actress until 1985.

== Personal life ==
Carr was married to engineer Tom Carr from June 12, 1965 to sometime in 1975.
