= Banzai Runner =

1986 film by John G. Thomas

- Directed by: John G. Thomas
- Written by: Phil Harnage; John G. Thomas
- Produced by: Kenneth L. Hulbert; John G. Thomas
- Starring: Dean Stockwell; John Shepherd; Charles Dierkop; Dawn Schneider; Ann Cooper; Barry Sattels; Billy Drago
- Cinematography: Howard Wexler
- Edited by: Drake Silliman
- Music by: Joel Goldsmith
- Production company: Montage Films
- Distributed by: Vidmark Entertainment
- Release date: May 1987
- Running time: 88 minutes
- Country: United States
- Language: English

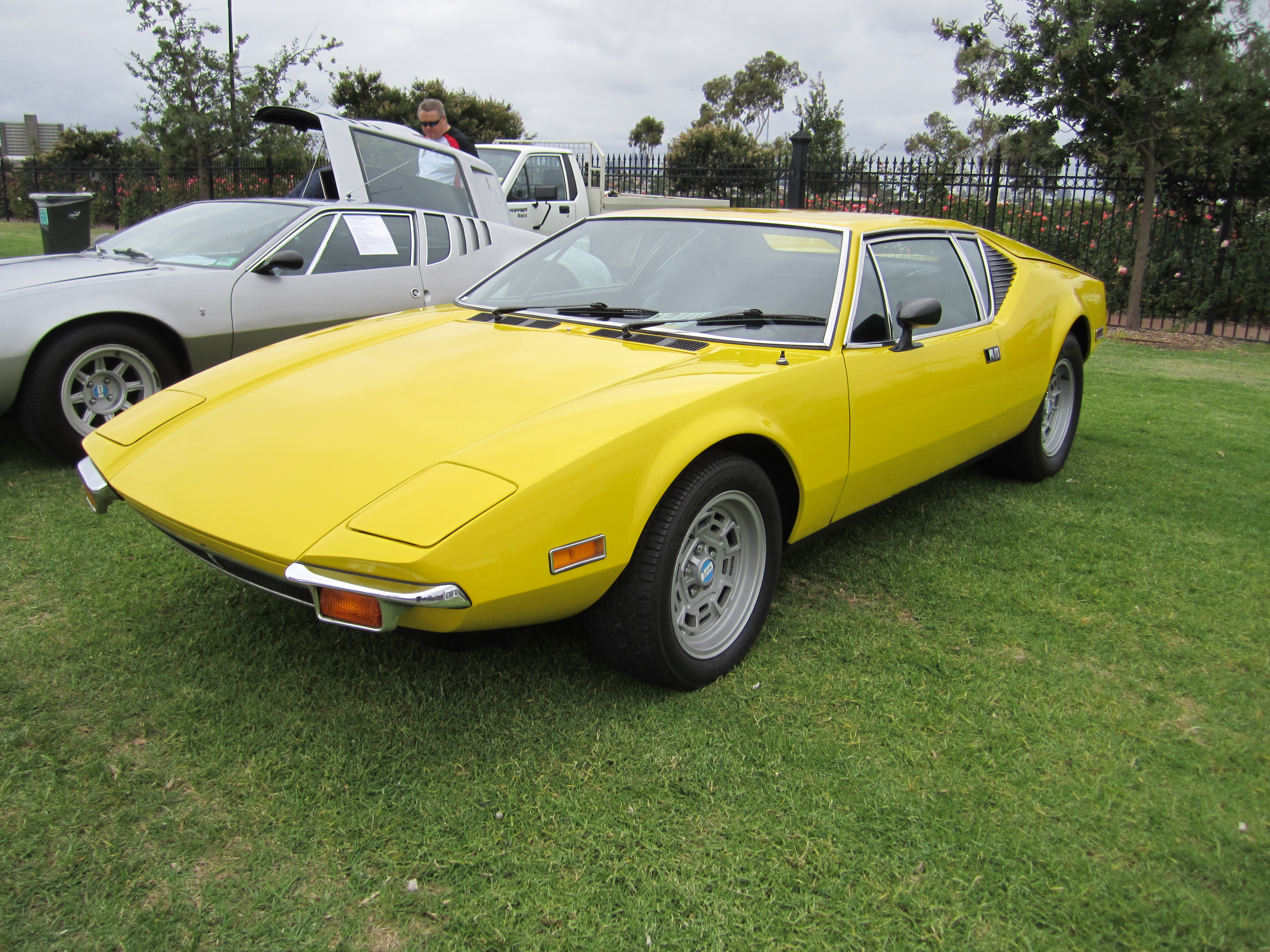
De Tomaso Pantera (Model used in Banzai Runner)

Banzai Runner is a 1987 American action film starring Dean Stockwell, John Shepherd, Charles Dierkop, Rick Fitts, Dawn Schneider, Billy Drago and directed by John G. Thomas.

== Plot ==
The Banzai Runners are a group of wealthy motorists who drive exotic cars at extreme speeds late at night on the public highways. Most of them do it for the excitement, but one is a ruthless drug dealer. During one of their rides, a policeman is killed. With no witnesses, it's up to the cop's brother to see justice is done. He goes undercover and joins the Runners, driving a 1972 DeTomaso Pantera.

== Cast ==
- Dean Stockwell as Barry Baxter
- John Shepherd as Beck Baxter
- Charles Dierkop as Traven
- Barry Sattels as Osborne
- Billy Drago as Syszek
- Dawn Schneider as Shelley
- Ann Cooper as Maysie
- Rick Fitts as Winaton
- John Wheeler as Hawkins
- Biff Yeager as Graham
