= Hamal 18 =

Hamal_18
- Directed by: John G. Thomas
- Written by: Michael Sherer
- Produced by: John G. Thomas
- Starring: Michael J. Minor; Yvette Ford; Wendy Cobb; Chad England; Joel Spence; Elina Madison
- Cinematography: Hilda Mercado
- Edited by: John G. Thomas
- Music by: Vincent Gillioz
- Release date: 2004
- Running time: 88 minutes
- Country: United States
- Language: English

Hamal 18 (also known as Hamal_18) is a 2004 American film starring Michael J. Minor, Yvette Ford, Wendy Cobb, Chad England, Joel Spence, Elina Madison and directed by John G. Thomas.

== Plot ==
A detective assumes the persona of his young daughter and hunts the internet for the man who killed her.
