= Rick Husky =

American television writer and producer (born 1940)

- Born: May 6, 1940 (age 85); United States
- Occupations: Television writer, television producer
- Years active: 1971–2004

Rick Husky (born May 6, 1940) is an American television writer and producer. He created the television series T. J. Hooker and Cade's County.

Husky also worked, in various capacities, on the television series Mission: Impossible; Daniel Boone episode "The Renegade"; Charlie's Angels; Tour of Duty; Walker, Texas Ranger and S.W.A.T.
