= Tin Man (1983 film) =

- Directed by: John G. Thomas
- Written by: Bishop Holiday
- Produced by: John G. Thomas
- Starring: Timothy Bottoms; John Phillip Law; Deana Jurgens; Troy Donahue; Richard Stahl
- Cinematography: Virgil Harper
- Edited by: Drake Silliman
- Music by: Bishop Holiday
- Distributed by: Goldfarb Distribution
- Release date: 1983
- Running time: 89 minutes
- Country: United States
- Language: English

Tin Man is a 1983 American drama film directed by John G. Thomas and starring Timothy Bottoms, John Phillip Law, Deana Jurgens, Troy Donahue, and Richard Stahl.

== Premise ==
A deaf auto mechanic invents a computer so he can hear and speak. When he attempts to patent his invention he is taken advantage of by a self-serving salesman.

== Cast ==
=== Main ===
- Timothy Bottoms as Casey
- Deana Jurgens as Marcia
- John Phillip Law as Dr. Edison
- Troy Donahue as Lester
- Richard Stahl as Tyson

=== Supporting ===
- Gerry Black as Maddox
- Brian Avery as Forbes
- Hank Underwood as Big Bob
- Michael W. Green as Slim
- Lori Hennessey as Cynthia
- L. Burton Williams as Johnson
- Walter G. Zeri as Wesson (Credited as Walter Zeni)
- Aaron Biston as Pizza #1
- Jay Elher as Pizza #2
- Rae Maguire as Nurse
- Jane Finstrom as Taco Bell Girl #1
- Laurette Healy as Taco Bell Girl #2
- Don Phillips as Policeman
- Will MacMillan as Artie

== See also ==
- List of films featuring the deaf and hard of hearing
