= T. J. Hooker =

American police procedural television series (1982–1986)

- Opening title card (seasons 1–2)
- Genre: Action; Police procedural
- Created by: Rick Husky
- Starring: William Shatner; Adrian Zmed; Richard Herd; April Clough; Heather Locklear; James Darren
- Country of origin: United States
- Original language: English
- No. of seasons: 5
- No. of episodes: 91 (list of episodes)

Production
- Running time: 47–48 minutes
- Production companies: Spelling-Goldberg Productions; Columbia Pictures Television

Original release
- Network: ABC (1982–1985); CBS (1985–1986)
- Release: March 13, 1982 – May 28, 1986

T. J. Hooker is an American police procedural television program starring William Shatner in the title role as a 15-year veteran police sergeant. It premiered as a mid-season replacement on March 13, 1982, on ABC and ran until May 4, 1985. The show was then picked up for a final season by CBS.

The abbreviation L.C.P.D., used in the series, stands for "Lake City Police Department" per the creator Rick Husky and the seal on the door of LCPD's police vehicles. Fictional Lake City was a stand-in for Los Angeles; the Lake City Police Academy exteriors were filmed at the Los Angeles Police Academy 1166 Academy Rd., Los Angeles, California, USA.

== Overview ==
Sergeant Thomas Jefferson "T. J." Hooker was a plainclothes LCPD Detective Sergeant whose partner was killed in the line of duty as he and Hooker tried to stop a bank robbery. An angry Hooker is motivated to rid the streets of criminals like those who murdered his partner. He concludes the only way to achieve this is to return to his former position in uniform. Hooker is a combat veteran of the Vietnam War, serving in the U.S. Army Special Forces during the early years of the U.S.'s involvement.

In "The Protectors," the series' pilot/TV movie, Hooker, in uniform, trains a group of police academy recruits, including those played by Richard Lawson, Brian Patrick Clarke, Kelly Harmon and Adrian Zmed. Hal Williams plays a senior officer and Richard Herd makes a brief appearance as Captain Sheridan, Hooker's superior. For most of the series, Hooker is partnered with brash, sometimes hot-headed rookie Vince Romano (Zmed). Romano is also a combat veteran of Vietnam. Hooker is his mentor, professionally and socially. Their age difference being key to their chemistry, the pair become fast friends and a good team.

Hooker is divorced as a result of work putting a strain on his marriage, but remains friendly with ex-wife Fran, a nurse. A ladies' man, Hooker is adjusting to the single life. Initially Lee Bryant portrayed Fran; the role is later played by Leigh Christian.

Hooker's no-nonsense demeanor often has him clash with Captain Sheridan, but he gets the job done and is highly respected. Working behind a desk, Officer Vicki Taylor (April Clough) continually dodges pick-up attempts by Romano. Introduced at the start of Season 2 was Officer Stacy Sheridan (Heather Locklear), Captain Sheridan's daughter. Initially brought in to replace Vicki, she progressed to patrolling with Jim Corrigan (James Darren), a veteran cop in the mold of Hooker.

From Season 3 onward, Hooker and Romano (Unit 4-Adam-30) and Sheridan and Corrigan (Unit 4-Adam-16), usually worked closely together to tackle cases. Corrigan and Sheridan's partnership added an extra dimension to the show, sometimes with whole plots revolving around one or both of them.

For the final season, the show went from prime time on ABC to a late-night slot on CBS. During the period between cancelation by ABC and being picked up by CBS, Zmed accepted a job as host of Dance Fever. This left Hooker to patrol alone or work as a trio with Sheridan and Corrigan, often undercover.

Blending humor and grittiness, the abbreviated first season ranked 28th in the Nielsen ratings, but subsequent seasons failed to reach that level. Season 3 saw a revamp (including rearranging the theme music to a more pop-driven version), with Corrigan in place as Sheridan's partner, and Captain Sheridan reduced to a few third and fourth-season episodes. A recurring character of Hooker's new boss, Lieutenant Pete O'Brien, portrayed by Hugh Farrington, was introduced. O'Brien was a veteran detective wounded in the line of duty. The injuries put him in a wheelchair, but he worked complex investigations and supervised officers. Stories drifted toward straightforward cops-and-robbers fare.

== Cast ==
Heather Locklear, James Darren and William Shatner in a fifth season publicity shot.

- William Shatner as Sergeant Thomas Jefferson "T. J." Hooker (Seasons 1–5)
- Adrian Zmed as Officer Vincent "Vince" Romano (Seasons 1–4)
- April Clough as Officer Vicki Taylor (Season 1)
- Richard Herd as Captain Dennis Sheridan (Seasons 1–4)
- Heather Locklear as Officer Stacy Sheridan (Seasons 2–5)
- James Darren as Police Officer Jim Corrigan (Seasons 2–5)
- Hugh Farrington as Detective Lieutenant Pete O'Brien (Seasons 3–5)

== Production ==
=== Background ===
The series was created as a reworking of The Rookies by Rick Husky, who worked on that show for Aaron Spelling and Leonard Goldberg. Originally called The Protectors, it was decided after the pilot to focus the series on the star and retitle it T. J. Hooker. Initially, it gave a more procedure-based view of police work than other cop shows of its era, but this did not continue beyond the early episodes.

=== Setting ===
The LCPD Academy scenes were filmed at the Los Angeles Police Department Academy at Elysian Park. Though the series was produced in Burbank and filmed in greater Los Angeles, the setting was never disclosed in any episode.

=== Vehicles ===
In the first, second and up to the fourth episode of the third season, Hooker drove a '77–'78 Dodge Monaco police package, but afterwards he started driving a '79–'81 Dodge St. Regis, usually powered by the 318 or 360 Cid V8. By the fourth season, when Hooker and his team needed an unmarked cruiser, they usually rolled around in an '82–'83 light blue Dodge Diplomat or a '77–'78 burgundy red Dodge Monaco. Hooker's personal car for the duration of the series was a '74 blue Ford Torino sedan. Romano's cars were a gold 1983 Datsun 280ZX and a Porsche 911, Corrigan's ride was a silver and red Jeep CJ-7 Laredo, and Stacy's car was a blue 1983 Ford Mustang LX convertible.

=== Cancelation and revival ===
T. J. Hooker was canceled by ABC in 1985. The final ABC episode was a proposed reworking of the series set in Chicago. CBS picked it up for late night and produced 17 new episodes (in Los Angeles), plus a two-hour primetime movie in Hawaii ("Blood Sport"). The new episodes were part of the CBS Late Night program block. The TV movie and penultimate episode were both aired by CBS on May 21, 1986, with the finale one week later. The late night episodes were made on a low budget, and reused action sequences from previous years.

== Episodes ==
| Season | Episodes | Originally released | | |
| Season | Episodes | First released | Last released | Network |
|---|---|---|---|---|
| 1 | 5 | March 13, 1982 | April 10, 1982 | ABC |
| 2 | 22 | September 25, 1982 | May 7, 1983 | ABC |
| 3 | 22 | October 1, 1983 | May 12, 1984 | ABC |
| 4 | 23 | October 13, 1984 | May 4, 1985 | ABC |
| 5 | 19 | September 25, 1985 | May 28, 1986 | CBS |

== Broadcast ==
=== American and international syndication ===
The series has aired in rerun syndication since its cancelation, including on A&E Network, Sleuth, Universal HD, and FamilyNet. More recently, MeTV and FETV have carried the program, and it has aired on MeTV+ since 2023.

In the United Kingdom, the show was originally broadcast by ITV starting in April 1983. Not all regions broadcast the entire series, with some areas not progressing beyond the third or fourth season. Some regions also broadcast the later episodes – particularly those concerning a more adult or violent nature – during later hours. In 2002, Five ran every episode, with some content edits for daytime TV. At present, Legend carries the series. In Australia, the series first aired on Network 10 from 1984 until 1988 and was seen in reruns on 7mate from 2012 to 2016.

== Home media ==
Sony Pictures Home Entertainment released the first two seasons on DVD in Region 1 and 2. Due to poor sales, no further seasons followed. This title is out of print.

In 2013, Mill Creek Entertainment announced that it had acquired the rights to various television series from the Sony Pictures library, including T. J. Hooker. It re-released the first two seasons on DVD in 2014.

In 2017, Shout! Factory acquired the rights and released T. J. Hooker – The Complete Series on DVD in Region 1.

| Title | Ep # | Region 1 | Region 2 | Region 4 | Special features | Distributors |
|---|---|---|---|---|---|---|
| Seasons 1 & 2 | 27 | August 9, 2005; April 1, 2014 (re-release) | September 26, 2005 | N/A | N/A | Sony Pictures Home Entertainment Mill Creek Entertainment |
| Season 3 | 22 | N/A | N/A | N/A | N/A | |
| Season 4 | 23 | N/A | N/A | N/A | N/A | |
| Season 5 | 19 | N/A | N/A | N/A | N/A | |
| The Complete Series | 91 | July 18, 2017 | N/A | N/A | N/A | Shout! Factory |
