= Tyrone Power Jr. =

American actor (b. 1959)

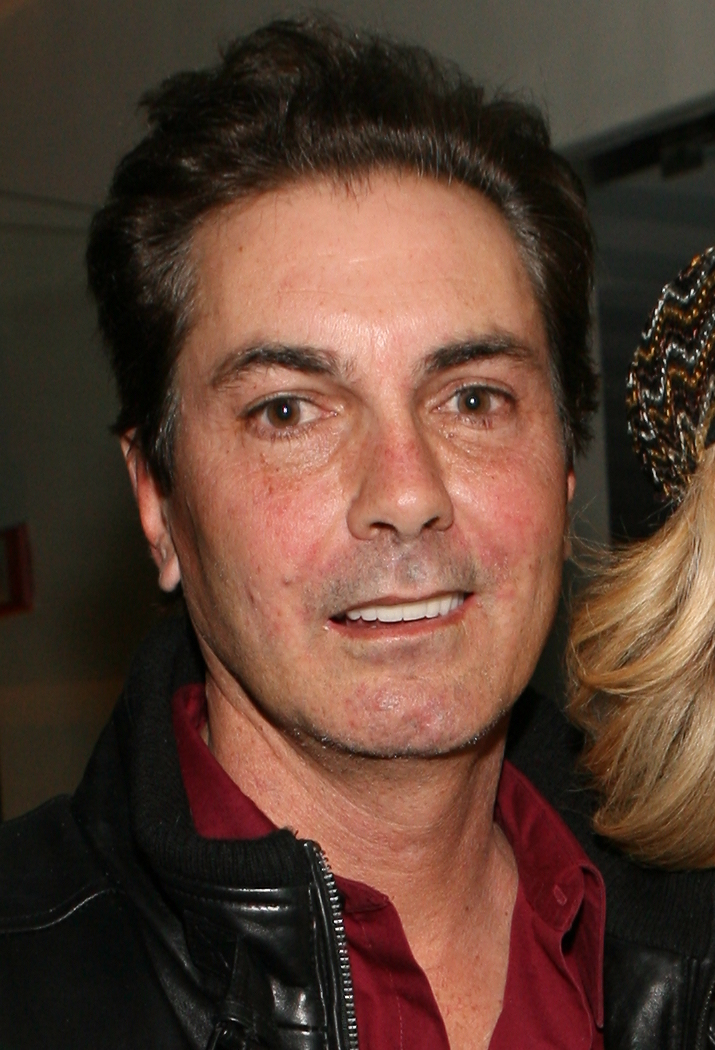
- Power Jr. at Canadian Film Centre
- Born: Tyrone William Power IV; January 22, 1959 (age 67); Los Angeles, California, U.S.
- Occupation: Actor
- Years active: 1985–present
- Spouses: DeLane Matthews (m. 1995; div. 2003) Carla Collins (m. 2007)
- Children: 1
- Parents: Tyrone Power (father); Deborah Minardos Power (mother)
- Relatives: Romina Power (half-sister); Taryn Power (half-sister); Tyrone Power Sr. (grandfather); Tyrone Power (great-great-grandfather)

Tyrone William Power IV (born January 22, 1959), usually billed as Tyrone Power Jr., is an American actor, the only son of Hollywood star Tyrone Power and his third wife Deborah Minardos Power. He was born after the death of his father.

He is the fourth actor to bear the name Tyrone Power, the first being his great-great-grandfather the Irish actor Tyrone Power (1797–1841). He is known as Tyrone Power Jr. because his father is the most famous of the four (his grandfather has retroactively become known as Tyrone Power Sr.). Tyrone Jr. has appeared in over 20 films and also made a guest appearance on the NBC sitcom Cheers.

In 1983, Power appeared at Denver's Elitch Theatre in a production of Outward Bound with Keir Dullea, Tammy Grimes, David McCallum, and Maureen O'Sullivan.

Power married Canadian comedian Carla Collins in 2007.

== Filmography ==
Year	Title	Role	Notes
1985	Cocoon	Pillsbury	
1988	Shag	Harley	
1988	Cocoon: The Return	Pillsbury	
1991	California Casanova	Peter	
1992	Soulmates	Scott	
1994	Healer	Nickel	
1997	Last Chance Love	Michael	
1999	California Myth	Roberto Klein	
2001	The Beautiful Illusion	Nick Cortero	
2002	Leaving the Land	Ezra	
2005	Lorelei: The Witch of the Pacific Ocean	US Battleship Captain	
2005	Elvis in Paradise		
2006	Downside	Kevin	
2007	Love and Honor	Brad	
2009	Bitch Slap	There Goes The Groom	
2010	Dreamkiller	Agent Benett	
2013	The Christmas Colt	Matt	
2014	High Risk	Bradley	
2015	Mansion of Blood	Doctor	
2016	My Friend Violet	Mr. Black	
2017	The Extra	Derrick Stone / Joe Fierrereaux	
2019	The Hero of Flight 757		
