= Lee Bryant =

American actress

- Born: New York City, New York, U.S.
- Occupation: Actress
- Years active: 1976–2015

Lee Bryant is an American actress. She is most known for a small role in the 1980 comedy film Airplane!. She also appeared as Sam Waterston's wife in the 1977 conspiracy thriller Capricorn One, and as Jennifer Westfeldt's mother in the romantic comedy Friends with Kids (2011).

Bryant was born in Manhattan, New York. She has guest starred in a number of television series including T. J. Hooker, Marcus Welby, M.D., Charlie's Angels, Kojak, Three's Company, Starsky & Hutch, Lou Grant, The Incredible Hulk, St. Elsewhere, Moonlighting, Alien Nation, and other series. She played a hysterical passenger in the 1980 film Airplane!, reprising the role in the 1982 sequel. She herself came up with the idea to improve upon the scene by having various people use violence to calm down her character. Her role in Airplane! also parodied a series of coffee commercials she had starred in throughout the 1970s for Yuban coffee. Directors Abrahams, Zucker and Zucker cast her without realizing Bryant was the original actress from the commercials.

Year	Title	Role	Notes
1977	Capricorn One	Sharon Willis	
1980	Airplane!	Mrs. Hammen	
1982	Airplane II: The Sequel	Mrs. Hammen	
1983	Death Mask	Jane Andrews	
1998	Holy Man	Money 'Meg'	
2000	Fear of Fiction	Mrs. Hopkins	
2006	Off the Black	Greeter #2	
2006	The Good Shepherd	Mrs. John Russell Sr.	
2011	Friends with Kids	Elaine Keller	
2015	No Letting Go	Emily	
