= Caged Fury (1990 film) =

1990 film

- Theatrical release poster
- Directed by: Bill Milling
- Written by: Philip Yordan; Fernando Fonseca
- Produced by: Bob Gallagher
- Starring: Erik Estrada; Richie Barathy; Roxanna Michaels; Paul Smith; James Hong; Greg Cummins
- Cinematography: Kenneth H. Wiatrak
- Edited by: Matthew Mallinson; Brian O'Hara
- Music by: Joe Delia
- Distributed by: 21st Century Film Corporation
- Release date: 1990
- Running time: 95 minutes
- Country: United States
- Language: English

Caged Fury is a 1990 women-in-prison film about a group of prisoners who decide to escape from an all-female prison. The film was directed by Bill Milling, and stars Erik Estrada, Richie Barathy and Roxanna Michaels.

== Plot ==
Discontent leads to a daring escape plan in a women's prison where the inmates are all lingerie-clad models and the lesbian warden demands unusual favors for early parole.

== Home video ==
Caged Fury was released to DVD by MGM (owner of the 21st Century Corporation catalog) on June 28, 2012, as a MOD DVD through MGM's Limited Edition Collection available through Amazon. It was released on Blu-ray from Shout! Factory on May 8, 2018.
