= The Scarf (film) =

1951 American film by Ewald André Dupont

- Theatrical release poster
- Directed by: Ewald André Dupont
- Screenplay by: Ewald André Dupont
- Story by: Isadore Goldsmith; E.A. Rolfe
- Produced by: Isadore Goldsmith
- Starring: John Ireland; Mercedes McCambridge; James Barton; Emlyn Williams
- Cinematography: Franz Planer
- Edited by: Joseph Gluck
- Music by: Herschel Burke Gilbert
- Production company: Gloria Productions Inc.
- Distributed by: United Artists
- Release dates: April 22, 1951 (New York); June 1, 1951 (Los Angeles)
- Running time: 93 minutes
- Country: United States
- Language: English

The Scarf is a 1951 American film noir written and directed by Ewald André Dupont and starring John Ireland, Mercedes McCambridge, James Barton and Emlyn Williams. The screenplay concerns a man who escapes from an insane asylum and tries to convince a crusty hermit, a drifting saloon singer and himself that he is not a murderer.

== Plot ==
John Barrington, an escapee from an institution for the criminally insane, is not insane but the victim of a plot orchestrated by a clever murderer. The only person who believes Barrington's story is Ezra Thompson, a turkey farmer who hides him from the authorities. A singing waitress named Cash-and-Carry Connie unwittingly provides the clue that will prove Barrington's innocence.

== Cast ==
- John Ireland as John Howard Barrington
- Mercedes McCambridge as Connie Carter
- James Barton as Ezra Thompson
- Emlyn Williams as Dr. David Dunbar
- Lloyd Gough as Asylum Dr. Gordon
- Basil Ruysdael as Cyrus Barrington
- David Bauer as Level Louie (as David Wolfe)
- Harry Shannon as Asylum Warden Anderson
- Celia Lovsky as Mrs. Cyrus Barrington
- David McMahon as State Trooper
- Chubby Johnson as Feed Store Manager
- Frank Jenks as Tom
- Emmett Lynn as Jack the Waiter
- Dick Wessel as Sid
- Frank Jaquet as Town Sheriff
- Iris Adrian as the floozy at Level Louie's Place

== Reception ==
In a contemporary review for The New York Times, critic Bosley Crowther wrote: "For a picture so heavily loaded with lengthy and tedious talk, talk, talk, 'The Scarf' ... has depressingly little to say. As a matter of fact, it expresses, in several thousand words of dialogue—and in a running-time that amounts to just four minutes short of an hour and a half—perhaps the least measure of intelligence or dramatic continuity that you are likely to find in any picture, current or recent, that takes itself seriously."

Critic Philip K. Scheuer of the Los Angeles Times wrote: "Although 'The Scarf' ... begins in the Mojave Desert and moves to Los Angeles, it seems to be taking place in a never-never land all its own. Its characters are a strange lot, given to a kind of mystical mumbo-jumbo in their speech—though once in a while a thought comes through with striking pertinence—and they are involved in an adventure which, like the hero, is more than a little off-base."
