= The Naked Hills =

1956 film

- Directed by: Josef Shaftel
- Written by: Helen S. Bilkie (story); Josef Shaftel (screenplay)
- Produced by: Josef Shaftel
- Starring: David Wayne; Keenan Wynn; James Barton
- Cinematography: Frederick Gately
- Edited by: Gene Fowler Jr.
- Music by: Herschel Burke Gilbert
- Production company: La Salle Productions
- Distributed by: Allied Artists Pictures
- Release date: June 17, 1956
- Running time: 72 minutes
- Country: United States
- Language: English

The Naked Hills is a 1956 American Western film directed by Josef Shaftel, starring David Wayne, Keenan Wynn, and James Barton.

== Plot summary ==
Tracy Powell, an Indiana farmer, gets the gold fever and heads for Stockton, California in 1849. There, he abandons his first partner, Bert Killian, and teams up with Sam Wilkins, a claim jumper employed by Willis Haver. Six years later, Powell returns to Indiana and his sweetheart, Julie. They marry and he tries farming again but, on the night their son is born, he takes off again searching for gold. This time he heads for the hills with an inveterate prospector, Jimmo McCann. A decade later, the two are still hunting for their big strike when McCann is killed in an accident. Powell returns home with news of a big strike but the deserted Julie will have nothing to do with him. His friend Killian will not believe him but Haver, now a banker gives him a small loan and then beats him out of his claim. Many years pass before he comes home, now sixty years old, and this time, his wife and son open their home to him. But he vows to go prospecting come next spring.

== Cast ==
- David Wayne as Tracy Powell
- Keenan Wynn as Sam Wilkins
- James Barton as Jimmo McCann
- Marcia Henderson as Julie
- Jim Backus as Willis Haver
- Denver Pyle as Bert Killian / Narrator
- Myrna Dell as Aggie
- Lewis L. Russell as Baxter
- Frank Fenton as Harold
- Fuzzy Knight as Pitch Man
- Jim Hayward as Counter Man
- Christopher Olsen as Billy as a Boy
- Steven Terrell as Billy as a Young Man

== Soundtrack ==
- James Barton – "The Four Seasons" (Music by Herschel Burke Gilbert, lyrics by Bob Russell)
