= David Hedison =

American actor (1927–2019)

- Hedison in Barnaby Jones, 1976
- Born: Albert David Hedison Jr. May 20, 1927; Providence, Rhode Island, U.S.
- Died: July 18, 2019 (aged 92); Los Angeles, California, U.S.
- Other name: Al Hedison
- Occupation: Actor
- Years active: 1949–2017
- Spouse: Bridget Mori Hedison (m. 1968; died 2016)
- Children: 2; including Alexandra

Albert David Hedison Jr. (May 20, 1927 – July 18, 2019) was an American film, television, and stage actor. He was known for his roles as the title character in The Fly (1958), Captain Lee Crane in the television science fiction drama Voyage to the Bottom of the Sea (1964–1968), and CIA agent Felix Leiter in two James Bond films, Live and Let Die (1973) and Licence to Kill (1989).

== Biography ==
=== Early life and career ===
Albert David Hedison, Jr was born in Providence, Rhode Island, to Armenian immigrants Albert David Hedison (Heditsian) Sr (Armenian: Ալպէռ Դաւիթ Հետիցեան) and Rose Boghosian (Armenian: Ռօզ Պօղոսեան). Hedison decided he wanted to be an actor after he saw Tyrone Power in the film Blood and Sand. Hedison enlisted in the U.S. Navy in 1945 during World War II, but the war ended before he completed basic training. He served 18 months before his discharge.

He began his acting career with the Sock and Buskin Players at Brown University before moving to New York to study with Sanford Meisner and Martha Graham at the Neighborhood Playhouse School of the Theatre and with Lee Strasberg at the Actors Studio. Early in his career, he had gotten a nose job.

He was billed as Al Hedison in his early film work until 1959 when he was cast in the role of Victor Sebastian in the short-lived espionage television series Five Fingers. NBC insisted that he change his name, so he proposed his middle name, which was accepted; he was billed as David Hedison from then on.

=== Theatre ===
He acted at Newport Casino Theatre. In 1951, he won a Barter Theatre Award for most promising young actor, entitling him to work at a theatre in Virginia. He did radio in North Carolina and worked on stage in Pittsburgh.

His work on the New York stage included an appearance in Much Ado About Nothing (1952). He was studying with Uta Hagen who recommended him for a role in the Broadway production of A Month in the Country (1956), directed by Michael Redgrave. It ran for 48 performances on Broadway. The Theatre World declared Hedison as one of the most promising theatre personalities of the 1955–56 season.

=== 20th Century Fox ===
After his role in A Month in the Country, Hedison signed a film contract with 20th Century Fox in May 1957. His first movie with them was the classic war film The Enemy Below (1957), which also starred Robert Mitchum.

He followed that up with the lead role in the horror film The Fly (1958) with Vincent Price as his brother. Hedison got the role after Rick Jason turned it down. The film was very successful at the box office.

Hedison went to England to play the lead role in The Son of Robin Hood (1958).

=== Television ===
Hedison was cast in the lead of a TV series made by Fox for NBC, Five Fingers (1959). He was reluctant to make it, especially when NBC insisted he change his first name (Al) to David (which was his middle name). The series lasted only one season.

Hedison had the lead role in an adventure film The Lost World (1960), directed by Irwin Allen.

Hedison guest starred on some Fox shows, Hong Kong and Bus Stop. He co-starred with Tom Tryon in Marines, Let's Go (1961).

Hedison worked regularly on television, guest starring in Perry Mason, Wonder Woman and The Farmer's Daughter. He co-starred in an episode of The Saint, starring Roger Moore who became a great friend. The episode's plot prophetically involves Moore's Saint mistaken for 007 and Hedison as an FBI agent — roles they would play seven years later as 007 and Felix Leiter in Live and Let Die. He was one of many stars in the film The Greatest Story Ever Told (1965).

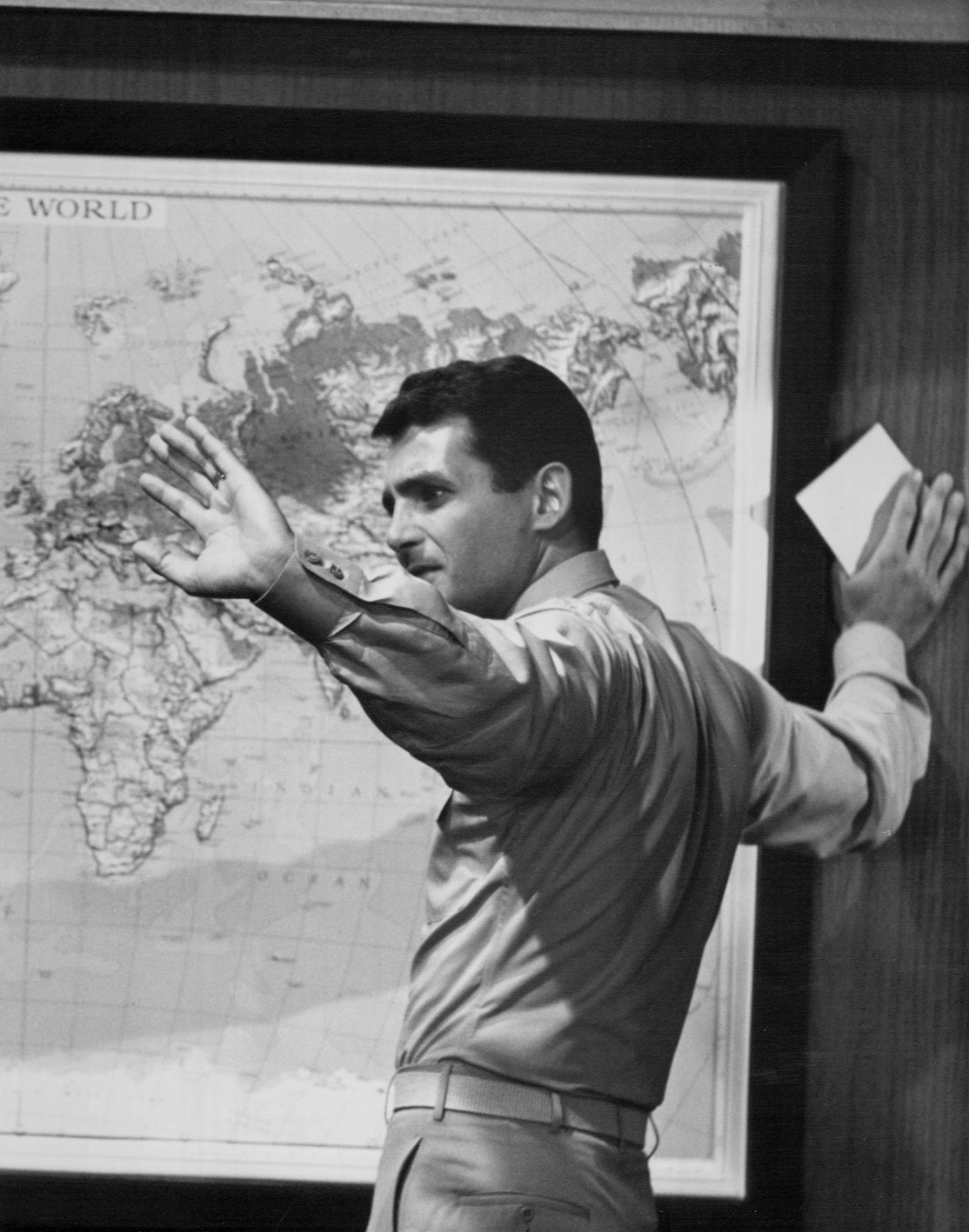
Hedison as Lee Crane in Voyage to the Bottom of the Sea, 1965.

After turning down the role of Captain Crane in the film version of Irwin Allen's Voyage to the Bottom of the Sea, Allen again offered the same role to him in the television series of the same name, co-starring with Richard Basehart, which ran from 1964 to 1968.

After Voyage to the Bottom of the Sea concluded, Hedison was offered the role of Mike Brady on The Brady Bunch, but turned it down, stating, "after four years of subs and monsters, who needs kids and dogs?" The role eventually went to Robert Reed.

Hedison moved to London. "I liked London very much," he later said. "I just wanted to go and spend a couple years there ... It's two years I'm not sorry for. The problem was, when I came back to the US, it was more difficult getting work then."

Hedison guest starred on Journey to the Unknown; Love, American Style; ITV Sunday Night Theatre; the BBC's Play of the Month; The F.B.I.; and The New Perry Mason. He could be seen in Kemek (1970), A Kiss Is Just a Kiss (1971), Crime Club (1973), The Cat Creature, and The Man in the Wood. He was most proud of doing an adaptation of Summer and Smoke with Lee Remick.

=== James Bond appearances ===
Hedison played Felix Leiter in Live and Let Die (1973), with his friend Roger Moore starring as the new James Bond. Bond scholars Pfeiffer and Worrall praised the friendship between Leiter and Bond for being depicted with "genuine chemistry" between the two.

Sixteen years later, Hedison returned to play Leiter in Licence to Kill (1989), with Bond now being portrayed by Timothy Dalton. Hedison became the first actor to reprise the role of Felix Leiter and is the only actor to play Leiter with two different James Bonds.

Hedison thought he was asked back because "there was much more to do in the film than in the past, and they were afraid of using an unknown or someone they were not quite sure of." "I think in this kind of film, it won't lead to other work unless you do something stand-out with a really wonderfully written scene," added Hedison. "Otherwise you're just doing a job, part of the ensemble. And in this case, I have lots of action scenes, but no one scene that is memorable ... Felix is a fairly one-dimensional character, you never get into any depth. You do what you can. There's not much to play. All you can do is perform it with a simple reality ... It was running around, bang bang, getting wet, screaming and yelling, and all kinds of fun, but not serious acting."

=== 1980s ===
Hedison toured with Barbara Anderson and Anita Gillette in Neil Simon's Chapter Two in 1979 and 1980.

He could be seen in the movie North Sea Hijack (1980), which starred Roger Moore, and TV episodes of Charlie's Angels, Nero Wolfe, Hart to Hart, T. J. Hooker, Matt Houston, Amanda's, Dynasty, Fantasy Island, Partners in Crime, The Fall Guy, The Love Boat, Simon & Simon, Double Trouble, Finder of Lost Loves, Knight Rider, Crazy Like a Fox, The A-Team, Trapper John, M.D., Hotel, The Colbys, Who's the Boss?, The Law & Harry McGraw, and Murder, She Wrote.

He was in The Awakening of Cassie for Romance Theatre, Kenny Rogers as The Gambler: The Adventure Continues, and The Naked Face (1984) with Moore.

Hedison appeared in the West Coast premiere of Forty Deuce in 1985.

=== Later career ===
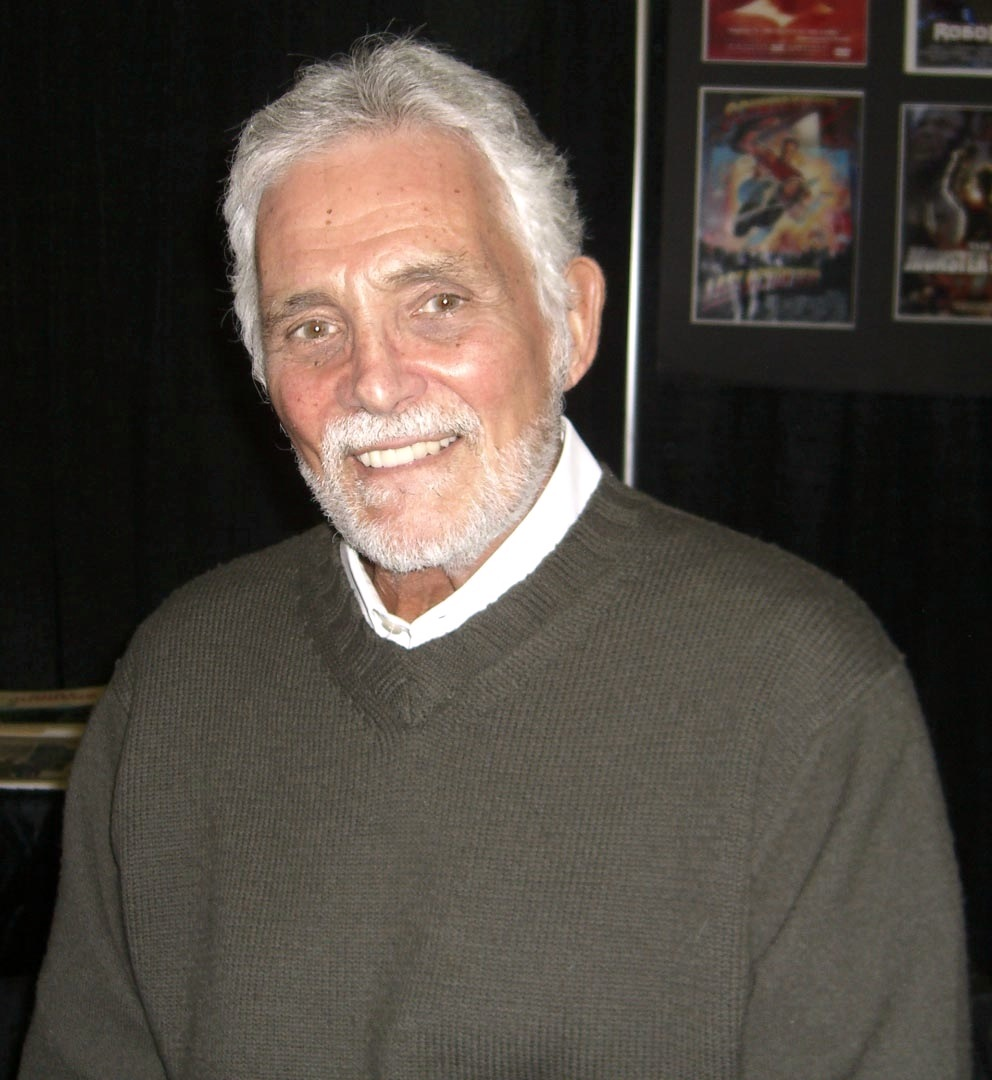
Hedison at the Big Apple Convention in 2009

From 1991 to 1996, Hedison was a regular on the long-running soap opera Another World.

He also starred in the New York City premiere of First Love with Lois Nettleton in 1999. He returned to the Cape Playhouse to appear in Tale of the Allergist's Wife (2002), and at Monmouth University's Pollak Theatre, in Love Letters with Nancy Dussault in 2007.

He had a role in The Young and the Restless and could be seen in The Reality Trap (2005).

In 2006, he acted in The Scent of Jasmine at the Fountain Theatre in Los Angeles on November 13. In 2008, Hedison performed Uncle Vanya at the Actors Studio West. He also participated in performances of The Cherry Orchard and I Never Sang for My Father in Los Angeles in 2009. He later appeared in The Marriage Play by Edward Albee.

He was in Superman and the Secret Planet and Confessions of a Teenage Jesus Jerk.

== Personal life ==
He and his wife Bridget were married in London on June 29, 1968. Bridget Hedison died of breast cancer on February 22, 2016. They had two daughters, actor/director/photographer Alexandra Hedison and editor/producer Serena Hedison. Alexandra Hedison has appeared in L.A. Firefighters and The L Word and is married to actress and director Jodie Foster.

== Death ==
He died on July 18, 2019, at his home in Los Angeles.

== Filmography ==
=== Film ===
Year	Title	Role	Notes
1957	The Enemy Below	Lt. Ware	
1958	The Fly	Andre Delambre	
1958	The Son of Robin Hood	Jamie	
1958	Rally Round the Flag, Boys!	Narrator	Voice, Uncredited
1960	The Lost World	Ed Malone	
1961	Marines, Let's Go	Pfc. Dave Chatfield	
1965	The Greatest Story Ever Told	Philip	
1970	Kemek	Nick	
1973	Live and Let Die	Felix Leiter	
1980	North Sea Hijack	Robert King	
1984	The Naked Face	Dr. Peter Hadley	
1986	Smart Alec	Frank Wheeler	
1989	Licence to Kill	Felix Leiter	
1990	Undeclared War	US Ambassador	
1999	Fugitive Mind	Senator Davis	Direct-to-video
2001	Mach 2	Stuart Davis	
2001	Megiddo: The Omega Code 2	Daniel Alexander	
2004	Spectres	William	
2005	The Reality Trap	Morgan Jameson	
2013	Superman and the Secret Planet	Jor-El	Direct-to-video
2017	Confessions of a Teenage Jesus Jerk	Interviewee #2	(final film role)

=== Television ===
Year	Title	Role	Notes
1954	Danger		Episode: "Padlocks"
1955	Kraft Television Theatre		Episode: "Eleven O'Clock Flight"
1956	Star Tonight		Episode: "The Mirthmaker"
1959–1960	Five Fingers	Victor Sebastian	16 episodes
1961	Hong Kong	Roger Ames	Episode: "Lesson in Fear"
1961	Bus Stop	Max Hendricks	Episode: "Call Back Yesterday"
1962	Perry Mason	Damion White	Episode: "The Case of the Dodging Domino"
1964	The Saint	Bill Harvey	Episode: "Luella"
1964	The Farmer's Daughter	Richard Barden	Episode: "The Mink Machine"
1964–1968	Voyage to the Bottom of the Sea	Captain Lee Crane	110 episodes
1967	Hollywood Squares	Himself	5 episodes
1967	The Mike Douglas Show	Himself	1 episode
1967	The Merv Griffin Show	Himself	1 episode
1968	Journey to the Unknown	William Searle	Episode: "Somewhere in a Crowd"
1969	Love, American Style	Rob	Segment: "Love and the Other Love"
1971	A Kiss Is Just a Kiss	Kit Shaeffer	Television film
1972	ITV Sunday Night Theatre	Bill Kromin	Episode: "A Man About a Dog"
1972	Play of the Month	John Buchanan	Episode: "Summer and Smoke"
1972–1973	The F.B.I.	Scott Jordan / Lou Forrester	2 episodes
1973	Crime Club	Nick Kelton	Television film
1973	The Cat Creature	Prof. Roger Edmonds	Television film
1973	The New Perry Mason	Calvin Ryan	Episode: "The Case of the Frenzied Feminist"
1973	The Man in the Wood	Edmund Hardy	Television film
1973–1975	Cannon	David Farnum / John Sandler / Gordon Bell	3 episodes
1974	Shaft	Gil Kirkwood	Episode: "The Capricorn Murders"
1974	Medical Center	Dave	Episode: "Dark Warning"
1974	The Wide World of Mystery	Herbert Kasson	Episode: "Murder Impossible"
1974	The Compliment	Steve Barker	Television film
1974	The Manhunter	Jeffrey Donnenfield	Episode: "The Man Who Thought He Was Dillinger"
1974	The ABC Afternoon Playbreak	Clay	Episode: "Can I Save My Children?"
1975	For the Use of the Hall	Allen	Television film
1975	Adventures of the Queen	Dr. Peter Brooks	Television film
1975	The Lives of Jenny Dolan	Dr. Wes Dolan	Television film
1975	The Art of Crime	Parker Sharon	Television film
1975	Bronk	Lyle Brewster	Episode: "Betrayal"
1976	Ellery Queen	Roger Woods	Episode: "The Adventure of the Eccentric Engineer"
1976	Family	Peter Towne	2 episodes
1977	Barnaby Jones	Paul Nugent	Episode: "The Deadly Charade"
1977	Murder in Peyton Place	Steven Cord	Television film
1977	Wonder Woman	Evan Robley	Episode: "The Queen and the Thief"
1977	Gibbsville		Episode: "The Grand Gesture"
1977–1985	The Love Boat	Cliff Jacobs / Barry Singer / Bradford York / Allan Christensen / Sherman / Buddy Stanfield	7 episodes
1978	The Bob Newhart Show	Steve Darnell	Episode: "It Didn't Happen One Night"
1978	Project U.F.O.	Frederick Flanagan	Episode: "Sighting 4011: The Dollhouse Incident"
1978	Colorado C.I.	David Royce	Television film
1978	Flying High	Glen Dodson	Episode: "High Rollers"
1978–1981	Charlie's Angels	John Thornwood / Carter Gillis	2 episodes
1978–1984	Fantasy Island	Daniel Garman / Phillip Camden / Captain John Day / David Tabori / Karl Dixon / Claude Duncan / Carlyle Cranston	6 episodes
1979	Greatest Heroes of the Bible	Ashpenaz	Episode: "Daniel and Nebuchadnezzar"
1979	The Power Within	Danton	Television film
1979	Benson	John Taylor	Episode: "Pilot"
1981	Nero Wolfe	Phillip Corrigan	Episode: "Murder by the Book"
1982	Hart to Hart	Miles Wiatt	Episode: "Hart of Diamonds"
1982	T. J. Hooker	Saxon	Episode: "The Protectors"
1982	Romance Theatre	Marc	4 episodes
1982	Matt Houston	Pierre Cerdan	Episode: "Recipe for Murder"
1982–1985	The Fall Guy	Monte Sorrenson / Milo / Jordan Stevens	3 episodes
1983	Amanda's	David	Episode: "All in a Day's Work"
1983	Dynasty	Sam Dexter	2 episodes
1983	Kenny Rogers as The Gambler: The Adventure Continues	Carson	Television film
1984	Partners in Crime	Davidson	Episode: "Fantasyland"
1985	Simon & Simon	Austin Tyler	2 episodes
1985	Double Trouble	David Burke	Episode: "September Song"
1985	Finder of Lost Loves	Neil Palmer	Episode: "Haunted Memories"
1985	Knight Rider	Theodore Cooper	Episode: "Knight in Retreat"
1985	A.D.	Porcius Festus	Television miniseries
1985	Crazy Like a Fox	Ed Galvin	Episode: "Eye in the Sky"
1985	The A-Team	David Vaughn	Episode: "Mind Games"
1985	Trapper John, M.D.	Miles Warner	Episode: "The Second Best Man"
1985–1987	Hotel	Dr. Howard Bentley / Jack Fitzpatrick	2 episodes
1985–1987	The Colbys	Roger Langdon	9 episodes
1986–1989	Murder, She Wrote	Victor Casper / Victor Caspar / Mitch Payne	3 episodes
1987	Who's the Boss?	Jim Ratcliff	Episode: "Mona"
1987	The Law & Harry McGraw	Blake Devaroe	Episode: "Mr. Chapman, I Presume?"
1992	Another World	Spencer Harrison	
2004	The Young and the Restless	Arthur Hendricks	50 episodes

Acting roles
Preceded by Norman Burton	Felix Leiter actor in EON James Bond films 1973	Succeeded by John Terry
New title	Sam Dexter actor from Dynasty; 1983	Succeeded by Ed Nelson
Preceded by John Terry	Felix Leiter actor 1989	Succeeded by Jeffrey Wright
