= The Power Within (1979 film) =

- Genre: Fantasy
- Written by: William Clark; Edward J. Lakso
- Directed by: John Llewellyn Moxey
- Starring: Art Hindle; Eric Braeden; David Hedison
- Music by: John Addison
- Country of origin: United States
- Original language: English

Production
- Executive producers: Aaron Spelling; E. Duke Vincent
- Producer: Alan Godfrey
- Cinematography: Emil Oster
- Editor: Dennis C. Duckwall
- Running time: 74 mins.
- Production company: Aaron Spelling Productions

Original release
- Network: ABC
- Release: May 11, 1979

The Power Within is a 1979 American television film.

The film was originally an unsold TV pilot and is also known as The Power, The Man with the Power, and The Power Man.

== Plot ==
A pilot develops super powers after being struck by lightning.

== Cast ==
- Art Hindle as Chris Darrow
- Edward Binns as Gen. Tom Darrow
- Joseph Rassulo as Bill Camelli
- Eric Braeden as Stephens
- David Hedison as Danton
- Susan Howard as Dr. Joanne Miller
- Dick Sargent as Capt. Ed Holman

== Reception ==
The Los Angeles Times film critic Kevin Thomas called The Power Within "amusingly absurd". Gail Williams of The Hollywood Reporter praised the film for being "surprisingly entertaining" and liked the "convincingly earnest performances" by Joe Rassulo and Joanna Mills. In a negative review, Variety said of the plot, "If it all sounds like kid stuff, it was indeed, with performances no better than they had to be." VideoHound rated the film 1.5 bones.

The film critic Leslie Halliwell criticized the film, writing, "You'd think there'd be a comic strip series in a hero who can shoot lightning from his fingertips, but this busted pilot bungles even that." Shock described the film as "an Aaron Spelling produced dud about an ordinary dude with electrical super powers, which hoped to lure in viewers with its low-rent science-fiction premise, since once-popular shows like THE BIONIC WOMAN and MAN FROM ATLANTIS had run their course."
