= The Statue (1971 film) =

1971 British film by Rod Amateau

- Original movie poster
- Directed by: Rod Amateau
- Written by: Denis Norden; Alec Coppel
- Based on: Chip, Chip, Chip by Alec Coppel
- Produced by: Anis Nohra executive Josef Shaftel
- Starring: David Niven; Virna Lisi; Robert Vaughn; Ann Bell
- Cinematography: Piero Portalupi
- Edited by: Ernest Hosler
- Music by: Riz Ortolani
- Production company: Josef Shaftel Productions
- Distributed by: Cinerama Releasing
- Release date: 1 October 1971
- Running time: 84 minutes
- Countries: United Kingdom; Italy
- Language: English
- Box office: 40,890 admissions (France); 205,231 admissions (Spain)

The Statue is a 1971 British comedy film starring David Niven, Robert Vaughn, and Virna Lisi and directed by Rodney Amateau. John Cleese and Graham Chapman appear in early career roles as the Niven character's psychiatrist and a newsreader, respectively. Niven plays a Nobel Prize-winning professor who suspects his wife, played by Lisi, of infidelity when she makes and unveils an 18-foot statue of him with private parts recognisably not his own. The film is based on the play called Chip, Chip, Chip by Alec Coppel.

== Plot ==
Professor Alex Bolt has developed a new universal language, Unispeak, which has made him internationally famous, winning a Nobel Prize at a surprise ceremony. His wife Rhonda has made a sculpture of her husband at the behest of the US State Department, commissioned by his friend, US Ambassador to the United Kingdom, Ray Whitely, for $50,000, in order to promote Unispeak. It is intended that the sculpture be unveiled in London's Grosvenor Square.

The sculpture is an 18-foot Greco-Roman style nude statue of Alex. He is embarrassed and fears it will cause a PR disaster and jeopardise his status. The two fight over whether the statue should be exhibited at all; further, Alex becomes enraged when he realises that the only parts of the statue to not resemble himself are the genitals.

Rhonda points out that she has only seen Alex eighteen days in the past three years. Rhonda is intensely amorous for Alex, but angrily rejects his company over the statue argument. Alex becomes convinced that Rhonda has had an affair and that her illicit model, whom he dubs "Charlie", must be the model for the mystery genitals. Meanwhile, Ray, who has no idea about the statue's appearance, fights with Alex over the unveiling of the statue. He begins to use CIA operatives to tail Alex and photograph his movements in an attempt to ruin and discredit him.

Alex seeks advice from his friend Harry, an advertising man trained as a psychiatrist. Members of the British government inform him that the statue is technically defamation if it doesn't represent his private parts accurately, so on Harry's advice, he tries to track down the model of the statue in order to prove the culprit and thus get it suppressed entirely.

Alex interrogates a household employee, Joachim, who thinks Alex is accusing him of an affair with his wife and attacks him. Joachim proceeds to give information to the Portuguese embassy, which makes it to Ray, who steps up his spying campaign. Alex then goes to a Turkish bathhouse to interview possible Charlies but is caught by the attendant and thrown out.

Harry suggests that Alex move on and forget about it, to which he ultimately commits. He surprises Rhonda with an array of thoughtful notes and gifts and a heartfelt apology, and the two retire to their bed in the first time in years. However, the enormous statue casts a shadow visible from the bedroom, and Alex becomes functionally impotent at the reminder. Alex and Rhonda fight once again, and Alex resumes the search for "Charlie".

Ray and his team of American diplomats have become increasingly disturbed as they catalogue Alex's various attempts to view men's genitals, believing him to be a pervert. Ray attempts to manipulate and seduce Rhonda in her loneliness, and Rhonda shows Ray the statue. Ray immediately reverses plans, as he too fears the effects of the statue's unveiling. After cornering Alex with the evidence of his seemingly perverted activities, the two come to a truce, with Ray sending his CIA and American military assets to help him track down the last few suspects.

Many hijinks and cul-de-sacs later, Alex has truly begun to give up hope for the mission. Harry meanwhile encourages him to pursue the final candidate, a sculptor living in Florence. Ray meanwhile decides to betray both Alex and Rhonda, by having two special military operatives break into Rhonda's studio and saw the private parts off of the statue. The operatives leave no evidence, and Rhonda becomes convinced that Alex did this; when Alex turns up again with another apology, she accuses him of deceit.

Alex decides to track down the final possible culprit; the Italian police are after him thanks to Ray and Rhonda, but he eventually tracks down what turns out to be an elderly sculptor who mentored Rhonda years ago. The sculptor directs Alex to find someone "well known" in a town square in Venice, and after a hectic police chase, Alex discovers the model source all along: the statue of David by Michelangelo.

Ray, believing that Rhonda is going to scrap the statue and make a new one, has the severed genitals discarded by a roadside, where they are immediately discovered by truant schoolboys and presented to their teacher. Ultimately, at the grand unveiling at the ceremony, Rhonda reveals that the statue has been recompleted, with exposed genitals and all – only that the head has been remodelled to resemble Ray.

== Cast ==
- David Niven as Alex Bolt
- Virna Lisi as Rhonda Bolt
- Robert Vaughn as Ray Whiteley
- Ann Bell as Pat
- John Cleese as Harry
- Tim Brooke-Taylor as Hillcrest
- Hugh Burden as Sir Geoffrey
- Erik Chitty as Mouser
- Derek Francis as Sanders
- Susan Travers as Mrs. Southwick
- Graham Chapman as news reader (uncredited)
- David Allister as Mr. Westbury

== Production ==
=== Songs ===
- "Charlie" by the Statuettes – lyrics by Norman Newwell, music by Riz Ortolani
- "Skin" Sequence – choreography by Gia Landi, lyrics by Audrey Nohra, music by Luis Enriquez Bacalov

=== Development ===
The film was the second in a proposed six-film slate from producer Joseph Shaftel which was going to cost £7 million in all and be distributed by Cinerama. The Statue, The Last Grenade, Goodbye Gemini (originally called Ask Agamemnon) and Say Hello to Yesterday were made. Masada and The Mind of the Assassin from Ken Hughes were not.

Dyan Cannon and Robert Culp were originally announced as supporting David Niven. "It's a fun role, in a fun picture", said Virna Lisi.

=== Filming ===
Filming began in Rome on 1 May 1970 at Cinecittà Studios.

== Reception ==
=== Critical response ===
Critical and audience reception of the film was poor, though Niven was praised for his efforts to sustain the film as the main character. The Los Angeles Times called it a "silly, strained farce."

Vincent Canby of The New York Times wrote in his review: "The Statue may have the distinction of being the first adolescent comedy about penis envy. Paradoxically, it is rated R, which will keep out most of the 12-year-olds who might be expected to find it good for a smirk".

Roger Ebert in his review wrote: "I suppose a funny movie might have been made of this material. No, on second thought, I suppose not. Certainly not with David Niven looking so uncomfortable you wish, for his sake, he were in another movie, or even unemployed. Anywhere except under those pigeons." It is one of only five films Ebert walked out on (the others being Caligula, Jonathan Livingston Seagull, Mediterraneo and Tru Loved).

== Release ==
The Statue was released in theatres in Ireland on 1 October 1971. The film was released on DVD by Code Red Studios on 18 May 2010.
