= A Man About a Dog =

1947 novel

- First edition
- Author: Alec Coppel
- Language: English
- Genre: Thriller
- Publisher: Harrap
- Publication date: 1947
- Publication place: United Kingdom
- Media type: Print

A Man About a Dog is a 1947 thriller novel by the British-Australian writer Alec Coppel. Driven to distraction by his wife's repeated affairs, her husband decides to kidnap her latest lover and commit the perfect murder, only to be thwarted by a dog.

== Film adaptation ==
In 1949 it was adapted into the British film Obsession directed by Edward Dmytryk and starring Robert Newton, Sally Gray and Naunton Wayne. Coppel himself wrote the screenplay. The film was retitled The Hidden Room when it opened in the United States in 1950.

== Play version ==
Alec Coppel originally wrote the story as a play when he was living in Sydney during World War II. He adapted it into a novel while travelling to London. Coppel titled the play and the novel A Man About a Dog, but in the United States, the novel was titled Over the Line.

The play opened in London in April 1946 and the novel was published in 1948, although many critics commented that the novel felt similar to a play.

Another production of the play was staged in London in May 1949 starring Griffith Jones. The Daily Telegraph wrote "the plot is neat and ingenious." The Observer called it "silly... an indiscreet as well as foolish play; the untidy last act abounded in lines likely to get the wrong kind of laugh - and they did."

== Bibliography ==
- Goble, Alan. The Complete Index to Literary Sources in Film. Walter de Gruyter, 1999.
- Keaney, Michael F. British Film Noir Guide. McFarland, 2008.
- Reilly, John M. Twentieth Century Crime & Mystery Writers. Springer, 2015.
