= A Rum Affair =

1940 Australian radio play by Alec Coppel

- Genre: Comedy fantasy play
- Running time: 30 mins
- Country of origin: Australia
- Language: English
- Written by: Alec Coppel
- Original release: 1940 – 1958

A Rum Affair is a 1940 Australian radio play written by Alec Coppel. It premiered on the Australian Broadcasting Commission (ABC) as part of a series of Australian plays. Though Coppel spent most of his career overseas, A Rum Affair was one of the rare works he debuted in his home country.

== Background ==
Although Coppel was Australian, the majority of his career took place abroad. A Rum Affair was among the few works he premiered in Australia, airing on the ABC in 1940 as part of a series showcasing Australian plays.

Coppel may have later adapted the play as The Story of an Inn, a stage comedy dealing with social regeneration that he announced in the 1940s but which does not appear to have ever been produced. The production was reportedly postponed due to its large cast. A 1943 article urged Coppel to finally stage the work, writing that audiences had long heard about it but never had the opportunity to see it.

== Premise ==
A young traveling man named Peter stops for the night at an inn in a Kentish village that was once on the sea but is now inland, as the sea has receded over time. The inn is haunted by a female ghost named Helene. Peter also encounters a man named Clifford and a local yokel.

== Productions ==
A Rum Affair premiered on the ABC in 1940 and was subsequently revived in 1942, 1946, and 1958.

The 1946 production starred Peter Finch and was directed by Frank Harvey. It also featured Sheila Sewell as the ghost Helene and Charles Wheeler in a supporting character role.

== Reception ==
Leslie Rees described the play as "a short, irresponsible comedy of fantastic situation," praising Coppel's originality in wit and his deft handling of suspense, and calling it "a saucy morsel."

Another critic praised it as among the finest radio scripts in years, describing it as a delicate, subtle work that left a lasting impression on its audience, and urged readers not to miss it.

A review of the 1946 revival praised Finch's performance and highlighted Sewell's portrayal of the ghost as seductive and effective. It also commended Wheeler's character work and called Frank Harvey's direction ideal.
