= The Bliss of Mrs. Blossom =

1968 British film by Joseph McGrath

- Videotape cover
- Directed by: Joseph McGrath
- Written by: Alec Coppel; Denis Norden
- Based on: the play by Alec Coppel; Based on a story by Josef Shaftel
- Produced by: Josef Shaftel
- Starring: Shirley MacLaine; Richard Attenborough; James Booth
- Cinematography: Geoffrey Unsworth
- Edited by: Ralph Sheldon
- Music by: Riz Ortolani
- Distributed by: Paramount Pictures
- Release dates: 11 September 1968 (US); 21 November 1968 (UK)
- Running time: 93 minutes
- Country: United Kingdom
- Language: English

The Bliss of Mrs. Blossom is a 1968 British comedy film directed by Joseph McGrath and starring Shirley MacLaine, Richard Attenborough and James Booth. The screenplay by Alec Coppel and Denis Norden was adapted from a play by Coppel that was based on a short story by Josef Shaftel, who served as the film's producer.

The film is loosely based on the real-life story of Walburga Oesterreich, who kept her lover Otto Sanhuber in the attic for a decade beginning in 1912. The real story does not have the happy ending of the film.

== Plot ==
Robert Blossom is a brassiere manufacturer and workaholic who secretly longs to be a musician, conducting imaginary orchestras in his home during his spare time. His wife Harriet Blossom is an imaginative and romantic-minded painter who loves and supports her husband but often feels neglected by him.

When Harriet's sewing machine breaks, Robert sends his bumbling employee Ambrose Tuttle to repair it. While in the home, Ambrose tells Harriet of his life as an orphan who never had a home of his own or anyone to love. Harriet is so touched by his sad story that she falls in love with him on the spot, and the two make love (depicted via a melodramatic fantasy sequence in which Ambrose plays an heroic figure who rescues Harriet). When Robert arrives home unexpectedly, Harriet hides Ambrose in the attic, instructing him to leave in the middle of the night. However, Ambrose is enchanted by Harriet and decides to settle in to serve as her secret paramour. The two engage in a wild romantic affair during the day while Robert is at the factory. By night, Harriet supplies Ambrose with Teach Yourself books, allowing him to transform the attic into an elaborate living space, as well as providing him with the education he missed in the orphanage.

When Ambrose is reported missing, Det. Sgt. Dylan from Scotland Yard is assigned to the case. Immediately his suspicions turn on Harriet, who claims that Ambrose never arrived at her home, despite strong evidence to the contrary. Dylan repeatedly attempts to catch Harriet in a falsehood by appearing unexpectedly at the home. On one occasion, he nearly catches the pair, but Ambrose happens to be dressed in a Mexican costume, and Harriet introduces him to the detective as her half-brother Juan. Dylan fails to recognize Ambrose in disguise, but comes to believe that Harriet is having an affair with her alleged half-brother, and that "Juan" helped her murder Ambrose.

Meanwhile, Robert frequently hears noises from the attic and finds evidence that another person is living in the house, but Harriet convinces him that it is only his imagination, causing Robert to believe he is losing his mind. Harriet and Ambrose come to realize that they both care deeply for Robert and feel guilty for their role in his mental breakdown. Ambrose resolves to help Robert by using his newfound education to secretly provide Robert with business advice, encouraging him to diversify his interests. Robert becomes wealthy beyond his wildest dreams and announces his retirement in order to pursue his lifelong love of music. On the eve of Robert's retirement, Detective Dylan returns, announcing that he has solved Ambrose's disappearance and that he believes Harriet is keeping her secret lover "Juan" in the attic. Robert and Dylan enter the attic to discover Ambrose alive and well.

Robert and Harriet go to court to divorce. During the hearing, Robert gives his businesses to Harriet and Ambrose as a wedding gift so that they can continue living together comfortably while Robert devotes himself to his music.

Some time later, Ambrose, soberly dressed for the office, has breakfast with Harriet and leaves her for a day of business. Harriet stamps on the floor, and Robert ascends from the basement, dressed in a mod outfit reminiscent of a rock star. They embrace.

== Cast ==
- Shirley MacLaine as Harriet Blossom
- Richard Attenborough as Robert Blossom
- James Booth as Ambrose Tuttle
- Freddie Jones as Detective Sergeant Dylan
- William Rushton as Dylan's assistant
- Bob Monkhouse as Dr. Taylor
- Patricia Routledge as Miss Reece
- John Bluthal as judge
- Harry Towb as doctor
- Barry Humphries as art dealer
- Clive Dunn as Dr. Zimmerman
- Julian Chagrin as stockbroker
- Sandra Caron as pet shop assistant
- Sheila Steafel as pet shop saleslady
- Frank Thornton as factory manager
- John Cleese as post office clerk
- Geraldine Sherman as Dr. Krunhauser
- Freddie Earlle as interpreter
- Jack Jones as himself
- The New Vaudeville Band as themselves

== Production ==
Josef Shaftel said the script was based on a story of his, which in turn was based on a true story. Alec Coppel's original script was set in Los Angeles but was rewritten to be set in London.

Shirley MacLaine was a last-minute replacement after the original star pulled out. Her fee was a reported $750,000. She signed in May 1967.

Assheton Gorton served as the production designer for the film.

Location scenes were filmed in Putney, Bloomsbury, at the National Film Theatre in the South Bank Centre and at Alexandra Palace in London. Interiors were filmed at the Twickenham Film Studios in Twickenham.

== Music ==
The soundtrack includes the songs "The Way That I Live" performed by Jack Jones, "Let's Live for Love" by the Spectrum and "I Think I'm Beginning To Fall In Love" by the New Vaudeville Band.

== Critical reception ==
The Monthly Film Bulletin wrote: "The smutty humour of the script – Mr. Blossom, whose supposedly endearing hobby is conducting the great orchestras of the world on his tape-recorder, is introduced as "the Orpheus of the undie world" – finds its match in the consummate vulgarity of Joseph McGrath's direction. Though both the fantasy inserts (with their allusions to the screen's great lovers) and the gaudy stylistic mixture of Assheton Gorton's designs pay devious tribute to a rich past heritage, this remains as sadly undigested as the Pinter-ish element in the plot. And only Freddie Jones as an outrageously effeminate detective induces anything like amusement."

In his review in The New York Times, Howard Thompson called the film "roguish, restrained and absurdly likable, with a neat climactic twist."

Variety described the film as "a silly, campy and sophisticated marital comedy, always amusing and often hilarious in impact ... although basically a one-joke story, [the] idea is fleshed out most satisfactorily so as to take undue attention away from the premise. Performances are all very good, Attenborough's in particular."

Time Out New York called the film a "coarse comedy which looks a little like Joe Orton gone disastrously wrong ... any sparks in the script or performances are ruthlessly extinguished by atrocious direction."
