= Just like a Woman (1939 film) =

1939 film

- Feature on the film from Picture Show (13 August 1938)
- Directed by: Paul L. Stein
- Written by: Alec Coppel
- Produced by: Walter C. Mycroft
- Starring: Felix Aylmer; Jeanne de Casalis; Fred Emney
- Cinematography: Claude Friese-Greene
- Edited by: Flora Newton
- Music by: Bretton Byrd
- Production company: ABPC
- Distributed by: ABPC
- Release date: 1939
- Running time: 71 minutes
- Country: United Kingdom
- Language: English

Just like a Woman (also known as Just like a Woman! and Sweet Racket) is a 1939 British comedy film directed by Paul L. Stein and starring Felix Aylmer, Jeanne de Casalis and Fred Emney. It was written by Alec Coppel and made at Associated British Studios, Elstree.

== Plot ==
A group of private detectives working for a jeweller pursue a gang of thieves in Argentina.

== Cast ==
- Felix Aylmer as Sir Robert Hummel
- David Burns as Pedro
- Jeanne de Casalis as Poppy Mayne
- Fred Emney as Sir Charles Devoir
- Henry Hewitt as Simpson
- Anthony Ireland as Roderique
- John Lodge as Tony Walsh
- Gertrude Michael as Ann Heston
- Hartley Power as Al
- Ralph Truman as Maharajah
- Arthur Wontner as Escubar

== Reception ==
The Monthly Film Bulletin wrote: "This lively and not too improbable story is put over crisply and briskly, and the suspense is well maintained. It works up from light comedy to effective crook melodrama. The direction is skilful, and the acting good."

Kine Weekly wrote: "Artless but pleasantly amusing comedy of romance and rivalry in the jewellery racket. The South American types and atmosphere are more colorful than convincing, but the breezy make-up of the humour does much to disarm, criticism on these scores. Armed with a reasonably attract give and competent cast, and reinforced with gangster thrills, it goes all out to amuse the masses, and seldom falls short of its objective."
