= Obsession (1949 film) =

1949 film by Edward Dmytryk

- Theatrical release poster (USA)
- Directed by: Edward Dmytryk
- Screenplay by: Alec Coppel
- Based on: A Man About a Dog; 1947 novel by Alec Coppel
- Produced by: Nat A. Bronstein; Kenneth Horne
- Starring: Robert Newton; Sally Gray; Phil Brown; Naunton Wayne
- Cinematography: C. M. Pennington-Richards
- Edited by: Lito Carruthers
- Music by: Nino Rota
- Production company: Independent Sovereign Films
- Distributed by: General Film Distributors
- Release date: 3 August 1949
- Running time: 96 minutes
- Country: United Kingdom
- Language: English

Obsession (released in the United States as The Hidden Room) is a 1949 British crime film directed by Edward Dmytryk. It is based on the 1947 novel A Man About a Dog by Alec Coppel, who also wrote the screenplay for the film. Obsession was entered into the 1949 Cannes Film Festival.

== Plot ==
Clive Riordan, a wealthy London psychiatrist, learns that his wife Storm is romantically involved with Bill Kronin, an American. He resolves to exact revenge on both by committing the perfect murder of Kronin.

After kidnapping Kronin at gunpoint, Riordan keeps him prisoner for months, chained up in a hidden room accessed from a nearby garage in a bomb damaged part of London. The authorities mount a search for the missing American which, with no leads, dissipates after a few weeks. Riordan theorises that keeping the American alive for months until his disappearance is all but forgotten will allow him to be killed without anyone suspecting a connexion to himself, the 'perfect' part covering the motive and opportunity.

During one of his daily visits to bring food and supplies, Riordan is unknowingly trailed by his dog Monty. The doctor had also been bringing hot water bottles full of acid to fill the bath, the perfect way to dispose of a body. Riordan reveals to Kronin that he plans to kill him and dissolve his corpse in the acid bath. Fearing that Monty might lead others to the secret location, Riordan resolves to kill the dog with the bath prepared for Kronin; however, Kronin manages to save the dog and keeps him safe from Riordan.

Riordan's plan appears to be succeeding until Superintendent Finsbury from Scotland Yard visits the doctor's office. Finsbury claims to be investigating the missing dog, but as the conversation drifts to the Kronin case it becomes clear that Finsbury harbours suspicions about Riordan. After a few chats with Riordan, Finsbury realises he has been having regular company with an American after hearing him use the Americanism, 'thanks, pal.'

Overhearing a conversation between Storm and Finsbury, Riordan decides it is time to act. He poisons Kronin, only to discover that he has trained Monty to empty the acid bath by pulling the plug chain. The police find Riordan’s car in his garage, which leads them to the hidden room and Kronin’s body. Realising his plan has failed, Riordan resigns himself to his fate and retreats to his club, while he waits for Finsbury to arrive and arrest him. Finsbury turns up and reveals that Kronin has survived, so Riordan has escaped a charge of murder.

Storm visits Kronin as he convalesces in hospital, telling him she is travelling abroad for a while. As she leaves, Monty jumps his lead and runs back to jump on Kronin's bed to dote on him. Storm smiles and leaves the two together.

== Cast ==
- Robert Newton as Dr Clive Riordan
- Sally Gray as Storm Riordan
- Phil Brown as Bill Kronin
- Naunton Wayne as Superintendent Finsbury
- James Harcourt as Aitkin (butler)
- Ronald Adam as clubman
- Allan Jeayes as clubman
- Olga Lindo as Mrs Humphries
- Russell Waters as Flying Squad detective
- Sam Kydd as club steward

== Background ==
Alec Coppel wrote the story as a play when he was living in Sydney during World War II. He adapted it into a novel while travelling to London. Coppel titled the play and the novel A Man About a Dog, but in the United States the novel was titled Over the Line.

The novel was published in November 1947, with many critics noting that it felt similar to a play. The original play was premiered in London's West End in May 1949, with Griffith Jones in the leading role and Reginald Tate directing, but it ran for only three weeks.

== Production ==
Film rights were acquired by the British producer Noel Madison. He also bought the rights to two other thrillers, Four Hours to Kill by Norman Krasna and The Last Mile by John Wexley.

Part of the finance came from two rubber merchants, Colonels Weil and Prior.

The film's director Edward Dmytryk, had recently left Hollywood following his appearance before the House Un-American Activities Committee. He travelled to England in mid-1948 and was granted a work permit by the Ministry of Labour under the foreign directors' quota agreement between producers and the film industry's trade unions. He signed a contract to direct the film with Nat Bronstein of Independent Sovereign Films on 1 October 1948.

Filming took place near Grosvenor House and Coppel's home, which was converted into a temporary dressing room.

Dmytryk went over the script with Coppel at a hotel at Lake Annecy. He later said Bronstein wanted a part in the film for his opera singing girlfriend, Marushka, and the producer was upset when one could not be found.

Dmytryk said Robert Newton had to place a £20,000 bond guaranteeing his sobriety during production, which lasted 30 days, and that Newton only started drinking on the last day of filming.

The plot involves disposing a body by dissolving it in acid. Because this appeared to have similarities to the case of the murderer John Haigh, the British Board of Film Censors initially refused to grant the film a certificate and its release was delayed.

== Reception ==
Dymytryk later wrote the film "was eventually released to good reviews and decent box-office returns. But it was seven months before the film was in the bag, and in those seven months, Jean [his wife Jean Porter] and I learned how to triumph over adversity—at least temporarily—kept afloat by a weird mixture of grief and happiness, of love and anxiety, but never hope. Still, it was a period of small victories that permits us to remember it with a certain nostalgia, and when compared to the year and a half that followed, it was a picnic."

=== Critical ===
The Monthly Film Bulletin wrote: "Alec Coppel's story, though ingenious, is rather thin and more suited to the theatre than to the cinema: although the director, Edward Dmytryk, does all that he can to subdue its theatricalities and achieves a very expert and fluent piece of film-making, Obsession remains a very lightweight melodrama, well worth watching for its technique but of minor intrinsic interest. The acting is variable: Robert Newton, though less mannered than usual, does not really convey Riordan's frightening obsession, Sally Gray is just adequate as his wife, Naunton Wayne excellent as the police Superintendent and Phil Brown (Kronin) gives the most striking performance."

Variety wrote that the film is slow-paced at first but becomes suspenseful.

The New York Times called it "a first-rate study in suspense and abnormal psychology."

In 1993, Kendal Patterson of the Los Angeles Times described the film as an early predecessor of Fatal Attraction.

== Notes ==
- Dmytryk, Edward (1978). It's a hell of a life, but not a bad living. NYT Times Books. ISBN 978-0-8129-0785-8.
