= James Barton (actor) =

American vaudevillian and actor (1890 – 1962)

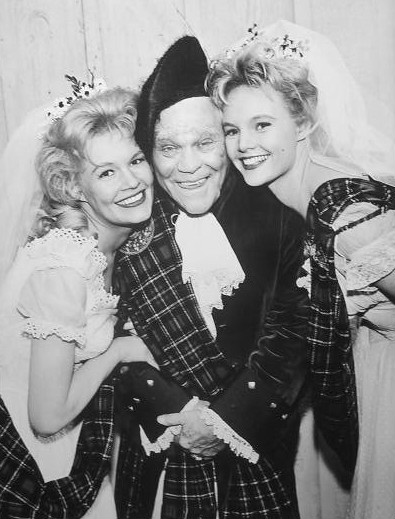
- Barton with Nan Peterson and Jackie Russell, in one of his last roles on CBS's Frontier Circus (1962)
- Born: James Edward Barton; November 1, 1890; Gloucester City, New Jersey, U.S.
- Died: February 19, 1962 (aged 71); Mineola, New York, U.S.
- Occupations: Vaudevillian; actor
- Years active: 1898–1962

James Edward Barton (November 1, 1890 – February 19, 1962) was an American vaudevillian, stage performer, and a character actor in films and television.

== Early life ==
Barton was born into a theatrical family, on November 1, 1890, in Gloucester City, New Jersey.

== Career ==
Barton began performing in minstrel shows and burlesque houses throughout the country in 1898. His years of experience working with African American performers led to his becoming one of the first jazz dancers in America.

After working with repertory companies in the South and Midwest, he made his Broadway debut in the musical revue The Passing Show of 1919 in a role originally intended for Ed Wynn. He frequently was the highlight in otherwise-mediocre productions, and a critic for the New York Daily News noted, "Whenever the book failed him, he shuffled into one or more of his eccentric dances." He commonly worked in blackface at the time. Barton's other theatre credits include Sweet and Low in 1930, Tobacco Road in 1933, Bright Lights of 1944 (which ran for only four performances), The Iceman Cometh in 1946, and Paint Your Wagon in 1951.

While appearing on Broadway, Barton also achieved the highest pinnacle of status in vaudeville, headlining at the Palace Theater on Broadway not once but eight times, from March 1928 through April 1932.

Barton's film career was also concurrent to his stage performances. It began in the silent era, in 1923, and he appeared in a number of Paramount Pictures short subjects in 1929.

On television he appeared in The Ford Television Theatre, Lux Video Theatre, Studio One, The Kaiser Aluminum Hour, Playhouse 90, Kraft Television Theatre, The Rifleman, The Americans, Adventures in Paradise, Naked City, and Frontier Circus.

Bing Crosby considered James Barton to be one of his ten favorite performers of all time, alongside names such as Al Jolson, Frank Sinatra, Lena Horne, Louis Armstrong, Judy Garland, and Nat King Cole. Sammy Cahn has stated he considered Barton to be the greatest entertainer ("If there was a decathlon for performing ... James Barton would win, going away."), and cherished the St. Genesius medal he was given by Barton's widow above his Academy Awards.

== Death ==
Barton died of a heart attack at Nassau Hospital in Mineola, New York, on Long Island, on February 19, 1962.

== Filmography ==
Year	Title	Role	Notes
1923	Why Women Remarry	Don Compton	
1929	After Seben	Nightclub Emcee/Gambler/Dancer	
1935	Helldorado	Motorcycle Cop	Uncredited
1935	Captain Hurricane	Capt. Zenas Henry Brewster	
1935	His Family Tree	Patrick 'Bosun' Murphy	
1936	Back to Nature	Motorcycle Officer	Uncredited
1936	Hideaway Girl	Motorcycle cop	
1941	The Shepherd of the Hills	Old Matt Matthews	
1948	The Time of Your Life	Kit Carson	
1948	Yellow Sky	Grandpa	
1950	The Daughter of Rosie O'Grady	Dennis O'Grady	
1950	Wabash Avenue	Harrigan	
1951	The Scarf	Ezra Thompson	
1951	Here Comes the Groom	William 'Pa' Jones	
1951	Golden Girl	John Crabtree	
1956	The Naked Hills	Jimmo McCann	
1957	Quantez	Minstrel	
1961	The Misfits	Fletcher's Grandfather	
