= Straightaway (TV series) =

- Genre: Adventure drama
- Starring: Brian Kelly; John Ashley
- Theme music composer: Maynard Ferguson
- Country of origin: United States
- Original language: English
- No. of seasons: 1
- No. of episodes: 26

Production
- Producer: Josef Shaftel
- Running time: 30 minutes
- Production company: Racer Productions

Original release
- Network: ABC
- Release: October 6, 1961 – April 4, 1962

Straightaway is an American adventure drama television series starring Brian Kelly and John Ashley which centers around two partners in an automobile workshop who design race cars. Original episodes aired from October 6, 1961, until April 4, 1962.

== Cast ==
- Brian Kelly as Scott Ross
- John Ashley as Clipper Hamilton

== Synopsis ==
Scott Ross and Clipper Hamilton are the co-owners of the Straightaway Garage, an automobile workshop, where they design, build, and maintain race cars. Scott specializes in designing cars, while Clipper is the better mechanic. Their work involves them in the world of lovers of speed and professional auto racing, which leads to various adventures for them, often after a client brings a car to the garage.

== Production ==
Straightaway, produced by Racer Productions, was plagued with production problems. While the series was in development, it went through three producers before finally settling on Josef Shaftel — the fourth person to take the job — as the series producer. Originally, the show was to have the title The Racers and include exciting racing sequences, and its original sponsor, the spark plug manufacturer Autolite, approved of the show's racing focus. During the summer of 1961, however, the Ford Motor Company bought Autolite. Ford wished to emphasize the safety of automobiles for family use, an image of cars obviously lacking in auto racing scenes. Before the show premiered, and at the insistence of Ford, the show was retitled Straightaway, the ten episodes that Racer Productions had already filmed before Ford became involved had to be reedited to delete their racing sequences, and later episodes had to deemphasize the show's original focus on racing.

Co-star John Ashley in real life was a rockabilly performer, and his character Clipper Hamilton occasionally sang during episodes of Straightaway. Maynard Ferguson composed the theme music for Straightaway, and his 1961 album "Straightaway" Jazz Themes contains music he composed for the television series.

Selchow and Righter produced a Straightaway-themed board game in 1961.

== Broadcast history ==
Straightaway premiered on ABC on October 6, 1961, and for the remainder of that year aired on Fridays at 7:30 p.m. At the beginning of 1962, it moved to 8:00 p.m. on Wednesdays, where it remained for the rest of its run. ABC cancelled it after only one season, and its last original episode aired on April 4, 1962.

After the show ended, ABC broadcast prime-time reruns of Straightaway during its normal Wednesday time slot, beginning on April 11, 1962, a week after the last new episode aired. The last prime-time rerun aired on July 4, 1962.

== Episodes ==
No.	Title	Directed by	Written by	Original release date
1	"The Leather Dollar"	Unknown	Unknown	October 6, 1961
Scott and Clipper sponsor a young boxer, unaware that his manager is betting against him. Luther Adler and Robert Blake (credited as "Bobby Blake") guest-star.
2	"The Tin Caesar"	Byron Paul	Elliot West	October 13, 1961
Clipper picks up a hitchhiker, drops him off at a gas station, and goes on his way. After Clipper leaves, the gas station owner is killed, but just before he dies he describes Clipper′s car to the police. The next day Clipper is arrested and charged with murder. Neville Brand, Whit Bissell, Jess Kirkpatrick, Hank Patterson, William Fawcett, Stewart Bradley, Sam Edwards, and Bill Bixby guest-star.
3	"The Nobles Oblige"	Unknown	Unknown	October 20, 1961
Scott and Clipper get involved in a dispute between two violent hot-rod gangs. Pat De Simone and Chris Robinson guest-star.
4	"Heat Wave"	Unknown	Unknown	October 27, 1961
Scott and Clipper pick up a hitchhiker in Carson, Nevada, and troubles ensue. Malcolm Atterbury, James Westerfield, Jim Hayward, Roy Barcroft, James Rawley, and Stanja Lowe guest-star.
5	"Die Laughing"	Unknown	Unknown	November 3, 1961
A nightclub comedian′s son holds him responsible for his mother′s death. Jack Klugman, Scott Marlowe, Frank London, and Lisabeth Hush guest-star.
6	"The Heist"	Unknown	Unknown	November 10, 1961
A gang of thieves hides out at the Straightaway Garage. Peter Whitney, Gavin MacLeod, Richard Bakalyan, Rita Duncan, and Robert Carricart guest-star.
7	"The Stranger"	Unknown	Unknown	November 17, 1961
Scott's friend Jeanne receives threatening telephone calls. Bethel Leslie, Kevin Hagen, John Chandler, Arvid Nelson, and Bob Hoffman guest-star.
8	"The Racer and the Lady"	Unknown	Unknown	November 24, 1961
Scott and Clipper enter their car in the Grand Prix, and an heiress wants to buy it at any cost. Joan Tabor and Gustavo Rojo guest-star.
9	"Pledge a Nightmare"	Unknown	Unknown	December 1, 1961
Scott and Clipper leave the garage open overnight so that a student at a nearby college can pick up his car. The next morning, they arrive to find the car still there — with the corpse of a child in it. Michael Parks, Ron Gans (credited as "Ron Kennedy"), John Brinkley, and John Mauldin guest-star.
10	"The Sportscar Breed"	Unknown	Unknown	December 8, 1961
A sexy photographer sets her sights on Scott, and Scott is smitten by her in return. Diana Dors and Irwin Berke guest-star.
11	"A Toast to Yesterday"	Unknown	Unknown	December 15, 1961
An aging movie star drives home after having a couple of drinks in a quiet nightclub. The next morning there is evidence that her car was involved in a fatal hit-and-run accident. Gloria Swanson, Kay Stewart, John Zaccaro, and Sue Winton guest-star.
12	"Troubleshooter"	Unknown	Unknown	December 22, 1961
Scott and an attractive test driver vie for an important contract. Myrna Fahey, Ron Hagerthy, Asa Maynor, Larry Blake, and Frank Wilcox guest-star.
13	"The Bribe"	Unknown	Unknown	December 29, 1961
Criminals kidnap a basketball star's wife to force him to throw a game. John Considine, Nina Shipman, Ralph Manza, Joey Faye, Jerry La Zarre, and Sam Balter guest-star.
14	"The Last Chance"	Unknown	Unknown	January 10, 1962
Scott and Clipper befriend a once-great racing driver whose drinking ended his career. Robert Strauss guest-stars.
15	"A Moment in the Sun"	Unknown	Unknown	January 17, 1962
Scott and Clipper introduce a girl named Jennifer to Paul, who seems to be a wealthy and charming young man. Jennifer is impressed by Paul's tales of his aristocratic background, but Scott wonders why Paul never pays his bills in cash. Robert Blake, Adrianne Ellis, and Henry Corden guest-star.
16	"The Drag Strip"	Unknown	Unknown	January 24, 1962
Scott and Clipper get caught in the middle of a feud when they help a rich young man build a race car. Peter Miles (credited as "Richard Miles"), James Bonnet, and Asa Maynor guest-star.
17	"Crossroad"	Unknown	Unknown	January 31, 1962
Scott and Clipper hire a young man with a criminal record, unaware his friend has plans for a bank robbery. Mario Rocuzzo, Michael Pagan, Roxane Berard, and Lew Gallo guest-star.
18	"Sounds of Fury"	Unknown	Unknown	February 7, 1962
A young woman is abducted in front of the Straightaway Garage. Mary Tyler Moore, Robert F. Simon, Ric Roman, and William Pullen guest-star.
19	"Escape to Darkness"	Unknown	Unknown	February 14, 1962
A young woman who escaped from a mental home asks for help, claiming that someone is trying to kill her. William Bramley, and Bennye Gatteys guest-star.
20	"Tiger by the Tail"	Unknown	Unknown	February 21, 1962
Scott and Clipper reluctantly hire an arrogant young know-it-all, who immediately takes over the Straightaway Garage. Eddie Foy III, Asa Maynor, Merry Anders, and Robert Burton guest-star.
21	"The Ledge"	Unknown	Unknown	February 28, 1962
Although Scott's old friend from his United States Army service has not yet fully recovered from wounds he suffered in combat, he asks Scott to teach him to drive again. Leo Penn, Ken Lynch, Maura McGiveney, and Ben Wright guest-star.
22	"The Longest Night"	Unknown	Unknown	March 7, 1962
An escaped killer seeks refuge in the Straightaway Garage. Paul Richards, Cece Whitney, George C. Sawaya, Hugh Sanders, and Roy Wright guest-star.
23	"Full Circle"	Unknown	Unknown	March 14, 1962
A man who has just been released from a sanatorium arrives at the Straightaway Garage and asks Scott and Clipper for a job. Stuart Erwin and Howard Caine guest-star.
24	"The Craziest Race in Town"	Unknown	Unknown	March 21, 1962
Scott and Clipper have a special engine built for an important race, but their competitors thinks the engine is quaint and amusing. Stanley Clements, Barbara Bain, Asa Maynor, Don Beddoe, and Larry Blake guest-star.
25	"To Climb Steep Hills"	Unknown	Unknown	March 28, 1962
A headstrong actor insists on racing cars, much to the consternation of both his wife and his studio. Paul Carr, Evan McNeil, Jay Adler, Arline Hunter, and Sam Balter guest-star.
26	"The Hoax"	Unknown	Unknown	April 4, 1962
Scott tries to free a young heiress who has fallen under the influence of a charlatan. Myrna Hansen, Tod Andrews, Dolores Quentin, Jack Shea, and Isobel Elsom guest-star.
