= A Kiss Is Just a Kiss =

- Written by: Alec Coppel
- Directed by: Alvin Rakoff
- Starring: Keir Dullea; David Hedison; Lelia Goldoni
- Country of origin: United Kingdom
- Original language: English

Production
- Producer: Michael Hayes
- Running time: 60 mins
- Production company: Anglia Television

Original release
- Release: 31 March 1971

A Kiss Is Just a Kiss is a 1971 British television play written by Alec Coppel for Itelevision playhouse. It was set in Hollywood and used an American cast.

== Premise ==
In Hollywood, wealthy young lawyer Kit Shaeffer, who has a wife and a house in the Hollywood hills, visits his best friend, Dr Alex Noon, for a check up to obtain life insurance for a large amount of money.

== Cast ==
- David Hedison as Kit Shaeffer
- Lelia Goldoni as Louise
- Keir Dullea as Dr Alex Noon
- Marc Zuber as Radio Operator

== Reception ==
The Western Daily Press and Times and Mirror called it "an unconvincing, but nasty little story played with suitable nastiness by a strong cast."
