= Philip Saltzman =

American screenwriter and producer

Philip Saltzman (September 19, 1928 – August 14, 2009) was an American executive producer and television writer. Saltzman was best known for his work as the executive producer of the 1970s CBS detective series, Barnaby Jones.

Saltzman was born in Hermosillo, Mexico, on September 19, 1928, to Jewish parents who had immigrated from Russia. He moved as a child to Los Angeles, California, with his parents. Saltzman obtained both his bachelor's degree and master's degree in English from University of California, Los Angeles.

Saltzman began his career in the television industry during the 1950s as a writer for the Alcoa Theatre. He would later work as a scriptwriter for a number of other television series and films, including The Swiss Conspiracy, The Fugitive, The Third Man, Perry Mason, The Rifleman and Felony Squad.

Saltzman was best known for producing the 1970s show, Barnaby Jones. Additionally, he was also a producer for The F.B.I. and later series of Columbo, as well as a 1975 television movie Attack on Terror: The FBI vs. the Ku Klux Klan.

Saltzman was married to his wife Caroline and had three children. He died in his sleep at the Motion Picture & Television Country House and Hospital in Woodland Hills, Los Angeles, California, on August 14, 2009, at the age of 80.

== Filmography ==
=== Films ===
Year	Film	Credit
1973	Intertect	Written By, Produced By
1974	The F.B.I. Story: The FBI Versus Alvin Karpis, Public Enemy Number One	Produced By
1975	Attack on Terror: The FBI vs. the Ku Klux Klan	Produced By
1975	Crossfire	Written By, Produced By
1976	Brink's: The Great Robbery	Produced By
1976	The Swiss Conspiracy	Written By
1978	Escapade	Executive Producer
1978	Colorado C.I.	Executive Producer
1979	The Paradise Connection	Executive Producer
1980	The Aliens Are Coming	Executive Producer
1981	Death Ray 2000	Executive Producer
1981	Unit 4	Executive Producer
1982	Bare Essence	Produced By
1986	That Secret Sunday	Written By, Produced By
1987	Perry Mason: The Case of the Murdered Madam	Executive Supervising Producer
1987	Perry Mason: The Case of the Scandalous Scoundrel	Executive Supervising Producer
1988	Perry Mason: The Case of the Avenging Ace	Executive Supervising Producer
1988	Perry Mason: The Case of the Lady in the Lake	Executive Supervising Producer

=== Television ===
Year	TV Series	Credit	Notes
1958	Alcoa Theatre	Writer	1 Episode
1958	Goodyear Theatre	Writer	1 Episode
1958	Richard Diamond, Private Detective	Writer	1 Episode
1958	Wanted: Dead or Alive	Writer	1 Episode
1959	Mackenzie's Raiders	Writer	1 Episode
1959–60	Five Fingers	Story Editor	16 Episodes
1959–62	The Rifleman	Writer	6 Episodes
1960	Lock-Up	Writer	1 Episode
1960–61	Surfside 6	Writer	3 Episodes
1961	The Detectives	Writer	1 Episode
1961–63	Hawaiian Eye	Writer	8 Episodes
1962	The Untouchables	Writer	1 Episode
1962–63	Stoney Burke	Writer	4 Episodes
1962–64	The Third Man	Writer	3 Episodes
1964	Dr. Kildare	Writer	1 Episode
1964	The Littlest Hobo	Writer	1 Episode
1964–65	Perry Mason	Writer	3 Episodes
1964–67	The Fugitive	Writer	6 Episodes
1965	Run For Your Life	Writer	1 Episode
1965	The Wild Wild West	Writer	1 Episode
1965–66	12 O'Clock High	Writer, Associate Producer, Story Consultant	17 Episodes
1966–69	Felony Squad	Writer, Producer, Executive Story Consultant	Multiple Episodes
1969–73	The F.B.I.	Producer	103 Episodes
1973–80	Barnaby Jones	Writer, Producer, Executive Producer	Multiple Episodes
1976	The Streets of San Francisco	Writer	1 Episode
1979	A Man Called Sloane	Executive Producer	10 Episodes
1984	Partners in Crime	Writer, Supervising Producer	2 Episodes
1985	Crazy Like a Fox	Writer, Producer	2 Episodes
1987–88	Jake and the Fatman	Writer, Executive Supervising Producer	14 Episodes
1989	Columbo	Supervising Producer	5 Episodes
