= The Tycoon (TV series) =

American situation comedy television series 1964–1965

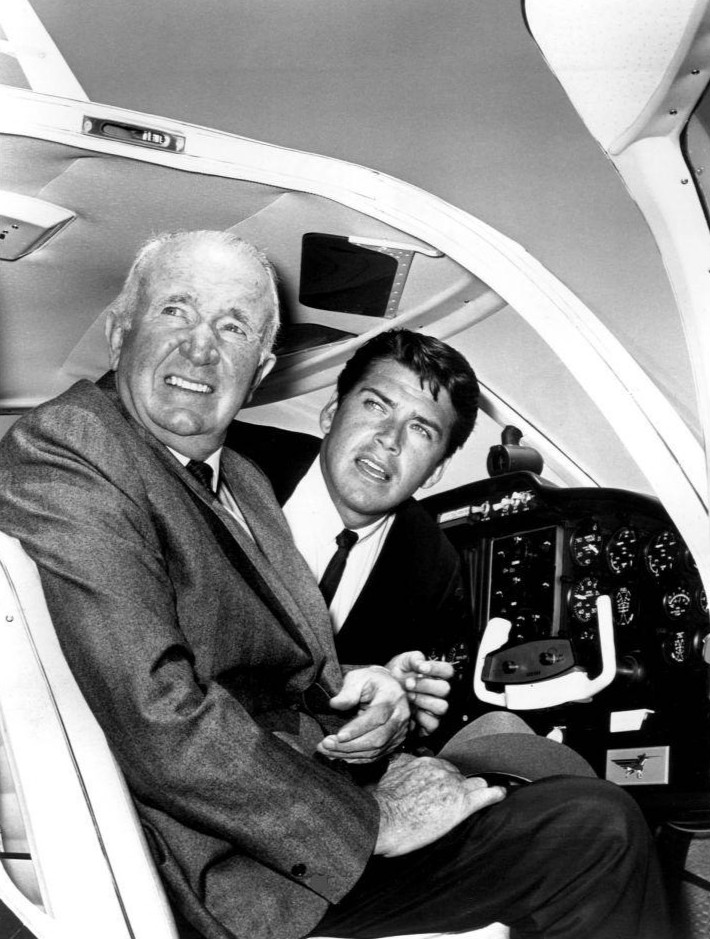
- Brennan and Van Williams from the 1964 premiere episode
- Created by: Charles Isaacs
- Starring: Walter Brennan; Jerome Cowan; Van Williams
- Composer: Les Baxter
- Country of origin: United States
- No. of seasons: 1
- No. of episodes: 32

Production
- Running time: 30 minutes
- Production company: Danny Thomas Productions (filmed at Desilu)

Original release
- Network: ABC
- Release: September 15, 1964 – April 27, 1965

The Tycoon is an American sitcom television series that was broadcast by ABC. It starred Walter Brennan as a cantankerous tycoon and Van Williams as his young assistant. The series was broadcast Tuesday nights at 9:00 to 9:30 p.m., and lasted from September 15, 1964 until September 7, 1965.

Van Williams was signed to the series to provide the romantic interest, and he took the part to learn comedy. Walter Brennan claimed the character he played in The Tycoon had more in common with himself then any other character he had played.

== Synopsis ==
Walter Andrews was a self-made millionaire who stayed too busy to retire. The eccentric tycoon had his own way of conducting business as the chairman of the board of Thunder Corporation. His unusual business practices often caused problems for those who worked with him, especially his assistant, and private pilot, Pat Burns. Andrews shared his home with his granddaughter Martha and his housekeeper Una.

== Cast ==
- Walter Brennan as Walter Andrews, the Tycoon
- Van Williams as Pat Burns, Andrews' young assistant and pilot
- Jerome Cowan as Herbert Wilson, company president
- Janet Lake as Betty Franklin, Andrews' personal secretary
- Pat McNulty as Martha Keane, Andrews' granddaughter
- Monty Margetts as Una Fields, Andrews' housekeeper

== Production ==
The Tycoon was produced by Charles Isaacs, and the executive producer was Danny Thomas. Sheldon Leonard was one of the directors. Walter Brennan had recently starred in a popular sitcom (The Real McCoys), and his new series was scheduled between two successful Tuesday night shows, McHale's Navy and Peyton Place, but The Tycoon failed to receive the ratings necessary to be renewed for a second season.

== Episodes ==
No.	Title	Directed by	Written by	Original release date
1	"Horatio Alger Again"	Unknown	Iz Elinson and Fred S. Fox	September 15, 1964
Walter sets up a challenge to prove his success is not a fluke by moving to another town, starting a new business and becoming rich again.
2	"Shotgun Meyer"	Unknown	Charles Isaacs	September 22, 1964
Walter has his eyes on a nice piece of property that would be used as a new industrial site. The problem is the owner, a grape grower, doesn't want to sell.
3	"Walter Gets Fired"	Unknown	Howard Leeds	September 29, 1964
Walter finds himself on both sides of the bargaining table in a management-union affair.
4	"The Great Race"	Unknown	Paul David and John L. Greene	October 6, 1964
Walter and his best friend are old rivals, and since each believes that their classic car is best, the two decide to race them.
5	"The Patient"	Unknown	Iz Elinson and Fred S. Fox	October 13, 1964
Walter, trying to bypass hospital rules when he goes in for a checkup, is outsmarted.
6	"Top Ten"	Unknown	Paul David and John L. Greene	October 20, 1964
Walter and Pat go to Midwest Tech to recruit a student from the top 10—and come back with number 11.
7	"Inside Job"	Unknown	Charles Isaacs and David Chandler	October 27, 1964
Walter does a quick shift when an electric eye invented by Pat adversely affects old friends.
8	"Mr. Fix-It"	Unknown	Paul David and John L. Greene	November 10, 1964
Walter is told he can't work in the company machine shop, but he still manages to indulge his love for tinkering.
9	"East Meets West"	Unknown	William Davenport and Charles Tannen	November 17, 1964
It's a Mexican standoff when Walter and Wilson pit their talents against a Japanese manufacturer.
10	"Boy Genius"	Unknown	Paul David and John L. Greene	November 24, 1964
Investigating a customer complaint, Walter finds it comes from a young man with a very high IQ.
11	"Toys in the Pentagon"	Unknown	Ed James and Seaman Jacobs	December 1, 1964
A new toy rocket launcher interests the U.S. Navy for important reasons.
12	"Talent Scout"	Unknown	Iz Elinson and Fred S. Fox	December 8, 1964
Walter sees an opportunity for an old friend to make a show business comeback. Andy Clyde, who played George McMichael on The Real McCoys, is cast in this episode as Skippy Draper.
13	"Harvey Brinkerhoff, Who Needs You"	Unknown	Ed James and Seaman Jacobs	December 15, 1964
Walter gives a job to the son of an old friend and finds that it was a big mistake.
14	"Baby Tycoon"	Unknown	Ed James and Seaman Jacobs	December 22, 1964
Walter finds himself in the middle of a proxy fight—with 3,000 valuable shares controlled by his infant grandson.
15	"No Place Like Home"	Unknown	Ed James and Seaman Jacobs	December 29, 1964
Walter is talked into a vacation and finds himself working harder than ever.
16	"The Honorable Doctor Andrews"	Unknown	Paul David and John L. Greene	January 5, 1965
Walter's associates arrange for him to get an honorary college degree—at first against his wishes.
17	"Thunder Bowl"	Unknown	Paul David and John L. Greene	January 12, 1965
Walter and Wilson try to outsmart each other with the company's bowling championship at stake.
18	"Muscles Don't Retire"	Unknown	Iz Elinson and Fred S. Fox	January 19, 1965
Walter investigates a senior citizen community and makes some startling discoveries.
19	"Romance, Incorporated"	Unknown	Iz Elinson and Fred S. Fox	January 26, 1965
Walter stages a whirlwind campaign to sweep a widow off her feet.
20	"South of the Border"	Unknown	Iz Elinson and Fred S. Fox	February 2, 1965
Walter and Pat visit Latin America and learn some interesting facts about retirement.
21	"Tom's Trouble in Transistorland"	Unknown	Paul David and John L. Greene	February 9, 1965
Walter enlists her granddaughter's husband in a Thunder Corp. experiment.
22	"Pat's Retirement"	Unknown	Iz Elinson and Fred S. Fox	February 16, 1965
Walter teaches Pat a less in the disadvantages of idleness.
23	"A Dog's Life"	Unknown	Ed James and Seaman Jacobs	February 23, 1965
Walter asks Thunder engineers to design a walking harness for a dog.
24	"Johnny on the Spot"	Unknown	Ed James and Seaman Jacobs	March 2, 1965
Walter and Pat are inadvertently involved with a robbery during a routine demonstration of a new television camera.
25	"Cloak and Dagger"	Unknown	Iz Elinson and Fred S. Fox	March 9, 1965
Walter and his staff find themselves in trouble when they discover somebody in the company is giving away top secret company plans.
26	"Walter on a Pedestal"	Unknown	Iz Elinson and Fred S. Fox	March 16, 1965
The town asks permission to erect a statue of Walter Andrews—and then Walter finds out why.
27	"Dangster Andrews"	Unknown	True Boardman	March 23, 1965
Walter becomes involved in the affairs of a drag racer, and when he's obliged to drive a racer, sets a new world record.
28	"It's All Relative"	Unknown	Iz Elinson and Fred S. Fox	March 30, 1965
A nest of nepotism is uncovered when Walter gets his granddaughter a job with Thunder Corp.
29	"Kitchen Caper"	Unknown	Paul David and John L. Greene	April 6, 1965
Walter has to decide which of his associates gets a new free kitchen—with each one's wife interested in the prize.
30	"Mr. Wilson in Retirement Land"	Unknown	Paul David and John L. Greene	April 13, 1965
Walter reassigns a job from Wilson to younger engineers.
31	"A Slight Case of Merger"	Unknown	Paul David and John L. Greene	April 20, 1965
Walter saves his housekeeper as well as his company from some bad deals.
32	"Honest Man"	Unknown	Paul David and John L. Greene	April 27, 1965
A pang of conscience sends Walter in search of a man he fears he wronged 50 years ago.
