= Mr. Denning Drives North (novel) =

1950 novel

- First edition
- Author: Alec Coppel
- Language: English
- Genre: Thriller
- Publisher: Harrap
- Publication date: 1950
- Publication place: United Kingdom
- Media type: Print

Mr. Denning Drives North is a 1950 thriller novel by the British-Australian writer Alec Coppel. When successful and happily married aircraft manufacturer Tom Denning attempts to commit suicide by crashing a plane, detectives uncover a murder in his past background that has driven him insane with guilt.

== Adaptation ==
In 1951 it was turned into a film of the same title directed by Anthony Kimmins and starring John Mills, Phyllis Calvert and Herbert Lom. Although adapted by Coppel from his own play, elements of the plot are significantly different between the two.

== Bibliography ==
- Goble, Alan. The Complete Index to Literary Sources in Film. Walter de Gruyter, 1999.
- Keaney, Michael F. British Film Noir Guide. McFarland, 2008.
- Reilly, John M. Twentieth Century Crime & Mystery Writers. Springer, 2015.
