= The Felony Squad =

American TV crime drama (1966–1969)

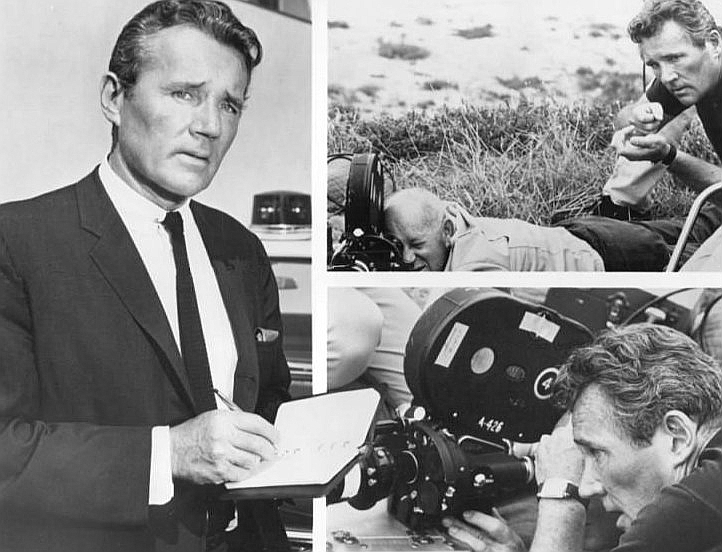
- Howard Duff working in front of the camera and behind it, 1967.
- Genre: Crime drama
- Created by: Richard Murphy
- Starring: Howard Duff; Dennis Cole; Ben Alexander
- Theme music composer: Pete Rugolo
- Composers: Pete Rugolo; Alexander Courage; Robert Drashin; Harry Geller; Gerald Fried; Warren Barker; Dean Elliott; Jeff Alexander; Lyn Murray; Shorty Rogers
- Country of origin: United States
- Original language: English
- No. of seasons: 3
- No. of episodes: 73

Production
- Executive producer: Walter Grauman
- Producers: Richard Newton (1966–1967); Philip Saltzman (1967–1969)
- Running time: 30 mins.
- Production company: 20th Century-Fox Television

Original release
- Network: ABC
- Release: September 12, 1966 – January 31, 1969

The Felony Squad is a half-hour television crime drama originally broadcast on the ABC network from September 12, 1966, to January 31, 1969.

== Overview ==
Sergeant Sam Stone and Detective Jim Briggs are investigators in a major crimes unit in an unidentified West Coast city. (Los Angeles City Hall is shown at dusk in the final scene of the opening credits.) Howard Duff's character was the veteran who was teaching his younger partner the nuances of life in this new facet of police work. Another main character was desk sergeant Dan Briggs, the father of Dennis Cole's character.

Originally titled Men Against Evil, the show was set to be a soap opera-type program that would have been broadcast two nights per week. By March 1966 Stone's alcoholic wife and other "main female characters" were removed, with the focus of the program changed from personal lives of policemen to the work of the police. In addition, following primary sponsor Liggett & Myers' objection about being associated with the word "evil," the show's title was changed.

== Regular Cast ==
- Howard Duff as Detective Sgt. Sam Stone
- Dennis Cole as Detective Jim Briggs
- Ben Alexander as Desk Sgt. Dan Briggs
- Frank Maxwell as Captain Frank Nye (1966–1967)
- Barney Phillips as Captain Ed Franks (1967–1969)
- Robert DoQui as Detective Cliff Sims (1968–1969)
- Len Wayland as District Attorney Adam Fisher (recurring)

== Guest stars ==
- Joe Don Baker as Shep in "My Mommy Got Lost" (1967)
- Francis De Sales as Harmon in "The Broken Badge" (1966)
- Rodolfo Hoyos, Jr., as Pepe Enciras in "Epitaph for a Cop" (1968)
- Don Keefer as Harry Jocelyn in "A Most Proper Killing" (1967)
- Ricky Kelman as Donny Clement in "The Fatal Hours" (1968)
- John M. Pickard as Cahill in "A Blueprint for Dying" (1968)
- Eric Shea as Mike Bradley in "A Date with Terror" (1966)
- Brooke Bundy as Betty Joyce in "The Deadly Innocents" (1968)
- Lana Wood as Sherry Martin in "The Last Man in the World" (1967)

== Episodes ==
=== Season 1: 1966–67 ===
No. overall	No. in season	Title	Directed by	Written by	Original release date
1	1	"The Streets Are Paved with Quicksand"	Michael Ritchie	Harold Gast	September 12, 1966
2	2	"A Walk to Oblivion"	Michael Ritchie	Franklin Barton	September 19, 1966
3	3	"The Broken Badge"	Vincent McEveety	George Eckstein	September 26, 1966
4	4	"Strike Out"	Andrew McCullough	Donald S. Sanford	October 3, 1966
5	5	"A Date with Terror"	Richard Donner	Hank Searles	October 10, 1966
6	6	"Flame Out"	Thomas Carr	Donald S. Sanford	October 17, 1966
7	7	"The Immaculate Killer"	Seymour Robbie	Alfred Brenner	October 24, 1966
8	8	"The Death of a Dream"	Richard Donner	Adrian Spies	October 31, 1966
9	9	"Prologue to Murder"	Allen Reisner	John Kneubuhl	November 7, 1966
10	10	"Killer with a Badge"	Jud Taylor	Donald S. Sanford	November 14, 1966
11	11	"Between Two Fires"	László Benedek	Harold Gast	November 21, 1966
12	12	"The Terror Trap"	Tom Gries	Alvin Boretz	November 28, 1966
13	13	"The Killer Instinct"	Robert Butler	Mann Rubin	December 5, 1966
14	14	"Fear Below"	Walter Grauman	S : Franklin Barton; T : Donald S. Sanford	December 12, 1966
15	15	"A Penny Game, a Two-Bit Murder"	Richard Donner	Adrian Spies	December 19, 1966
16	16	"Miss Reilly's Revenge"	Michael Ritchie	T : George Eckstein; S/T : Leonard Kantor	December 26, 1966
17	17	"A Death for a Death"	Herschel Daugherty	S : Harry Kronman; S/T : Donald S. Sanford	January 2, 1967
18	18	"The Deadly Partner"	Lawrence Dobkin	Donald S. Sanford	January 9, 1967
19	19	"The Night of the Shark: Part 1"	Allen Reisner	Harold Gast	January 16, 1967
20	20	"The Night of the Shark: Part 2"	Allen Reisner	Harold Gast	January 23, 1967
21	21	"The Strangler"	Lee H. Katzin	S : Lee Erwin; S/T : Tony Barrett	January 30, 1967
22	22	"Breakout"	Larry Peerce	Barry Oringer	February 6, 1967
23	23	"The Desperate Silence"	Allen Reisner	Gwen Bagni & Paul Dubov	February 13, 1967
24	24	"Target!"	Allen Reisner	Frank L. Moss	February 20, 1967
25	25	"Echo of a Killing"	Gene Nelson	Dan Ullman	February 27, 1967
26	26	"Live Coward, Dead Hero"	Robert Butler	T : Franklin Barton; S/T : Jay Simms	March 13, 1967
27	27	"A Blueprint for Dying"	Lee H. Katzin	Tony Barrett	March 20, 1967
28	28	"The Fear Merchant"	Lawrence Dobkin	S : Quentin Sparr; T : Tony Barrett	March 27, 1967
29	29	"The Savage Streets"	Seymour Robbie	T : Philip Saltzman; S/T : L.T. Bentwood	April 3, 1967
30	30	"Debt of Fear"	Lawrence Dobkin	John Furia Jr. (as "John Joseph")	April 10, 1967

=== Season 2: 1967–68 ===
No. overall	No. in season	Title	Directed by	Written by	Original release date
31	1	"Let Him Die!"	George McCowan	Tony Barrett	September 11, 1967
32	2	"The Counterfeit Cop"	Walter Grauman	Art Wallace	September 18, 1967
33	3	"A Most Proper Killing"	Walter Grauman	Franklin Barton	September 25, 1967
34	4	"The 30-Gram Kill"	George McCowan	S : Don Tait & Willian Koenig; T : Tony Bennett	October 2, 1967
35	5	"The Death Bag"	Charles Rondeau	Tony Barrett	October 9, 1967
36	6	"The Deadly Junkman"	William Hale	Don Brinkley	October 16, 1967
37	7	"The Pat Hand of Death"	Sutton Roley	Tony Barrett	October 30, 1967
38	8	"Hit and Run, Run, Run"	Seymour Robbie	Dan Ullman	November 6, 1967
39	9	"Time of Trial"	Gerd Oswald	Robert E. Thompson	November 13, 1967
40	10	"Who'll Take Care of Joey"	Herbert Hirschman	Tony Barrett	November 20, 1967
41	11	"My Mommy Got Lost"	George McCowan	Robert Heverly	November 27, 1967
42	12	"Ordeal by Terror"	Lawrence Dobkin	S : William Kayden; T : Philip Saltzman	December 4, 1967
43	13	"An Arrangement with Death: Part 1"	George McCowan	Franklin Barton	December 11, 1967
44	14	"An Arrangement with Death: Part 2"	George McCowan	Franklin Barton	December 18, 1967
45	15	"No Sad Songs for Charlie"	Gerd Oswald	Earl Felton	December 25, 1967
46	16	"Bed of Strangers"	James Sheldon	Jack Turley	January 1, 1968
47	17	"Killing, Country Style"	George McCowan	S : Judith & Robert Guy Barrows; T : Robert Heverly	January 8, 1968
48	18	"The Flip Side of Fear: Part 1"	George McCowan	Don Brinkley	January 15, 1968
49	19	"The Flip Side of Fear: Part 2"	George McCowan	Don Brinkley	January 22, 1968
50	20	"The Love Victim"	Nicholas Colasanto	T : Robert Heverly; S/T : Anthony Lawrence	February 5, 1968
51	21	"The Deadly Abductors"	Howard Duff	Jerry Devine	February 12, 1968
52	22	"Nightmare on a Dead-End Street"	Ron Kelly	Richard Landau	February 19, 1968
53	23	"Epitaph for a Cop"	George McCowan	S : Jack Morton; T : Jack Morton & Norman Klenman	February 26, 1968
54	24	"Man on Fire"	George McCowan	Jerome Ross	March 4, 1968
55	25	"Image of Evil"	Lawrence Dobkin	Bob Barbash	March 11, 1968
56	26	"The Human Target"	Herbert Hirschman	S : Ellis Kadison & Joel Kane; T : Norman Klenman	March 18, 1968

=== Season 3: 1968–69 ===
No. overall	No. in season	Title	Directed by	Written by	Original release date
57	1	"A Fashion for Dying"	Nicholas Colasanto	Don Brinkley	September 27, 1968
58	2	"Jury of One"	Gene Nelson	Jack Turley	October 4, 1968
59	3	"Underground Nightmare"	Nicholas Colasanto	Don Brinkley	October 11, 1968
60	4	"The Deadly Innocents"	George McCowan	Jack Turley	October 18, 1968
61	5	"Kiss Me, Kill You"	George McCowan	Franklin Barton	November 1, 1968
62	6	"The Nowhere Man: Part 1"	George McCowan	Philip Saltzman	November 8, 1968
63	7	"The Nowhere Man: Part 2"	George McCowan	Philip Saltzman	November 15, 1968
64	8	"Matched for Murder"	Robert Butler	Robert Heverly	November 22, 1968
65	9	"The Fatal Hours"	Otto Lang	Franklin Barton	November 29, 1968
66	10	"Hostage"	Gerd Oswald	Mark Rodgers	December 13, 1968
67	11	"The Distant Shore"	George McCowan	Mark Rodgers	December 20, 1968
68	12	"Dark Memory"	George McCowan	Mark Rodgers	December 27, 1968
69	13	"The Last Man in the World"	Harvey Hart	Robert Heverly	January 3, 1969
70	14	"Conspiracy of Power: Part 1"	George McCowan	Unknown	January 10, 1969
71	15	"Conspiracy of Power: Part 2"	George McCowan	Unknown	January 17, 1969
72	16	"Blind Terror"	George McCowan	S : Hank Searls; T : Robert Heverly	January 24, 1969
73	17	"The Law and Order Blues"	George McCowan	Harold Gast	January 31, 1969
This episode was a crossover with Judd, for the Defense.

== Production ==
The show was filmed in Los Angeles locations.

From the show's debut until September 1968, it was broadcast on Monday nights from 9 to 9:30 Eastern Time. In the Fall of 1968 it was switched to Fridays from 8:30 to 9 E.T. The program was cancelled at midseason after just thirteen aired episodes. The final episode of the series was part of a crossover with the ABC legal drama Judd, for the Defense, starring Carl Betz, which was cancelled at the end of its season after a two-year run.

Alexander's role in the series was not only onscreen but also offscreen as a technical adviser. His earlier work with Jack Webb in Dragnet was the basis for this added position, but resulted in his inability to reprise his role of Officer Frank Smith when Webb revived Dragnet in late 1966. He died of a heart attack less than six months after The Felony Squad left the air.

The Felony Squad was sponsored by L&M cigarettes, as seen on the 1967 episode "The Day of the Shark Part 1".

20th-Century Fox supplied the series. Pete Rugolo composed Felony Squad Theme.

== Critical response ==
Jack Gould wrote in The New York Times that the debut episode was "a very old-fashioned and conventional yarn about tight-lipped detectives doing a day's work."
