= Josef Shaftel =

American film producer, director and writer

Josef Shaftel (14 March 1919 – 9 March 1999) was an American film producer, director and writer. He made a number of films in England.

Shaftel was particularly prolific in the late 1960s and early 1970s. In 1970 he raised seven million pounds to film a slate of six movies for Cinerama. This included The Statue, The Last Grenade, Goodbye Gemini (originally called Ask Agamemnon), The Assassination of Trotsky and Say Hello to Yesterday.

In April 1972 Shaftel announced he would make sixteen films worth $20 million. However by April 1973 he was in receivership.

He declared bankruptcy in 1976.

== Selected credits ==
=== Film ===
- The Man Who Watched Trains Go By (1952) aka The Paris Express - producer
- The Naked Dawn (1955) - producer
- No Place to Hide (1956) - producer, director
- The Naked Hills (1956) - producer, director, writer
- The Biggest Bundle of Them All (1968) - producer, story
- The Bliss of Mrs Blossom (1968) - producer, story
- The Last Grenade (1970) - producer
- Goodbye Gemini (1970) - producer
- Say Hello to Yesterday (1971) - producer
- The Statue (1971) - producer
- The Trojan Women (1971) - executive producer
- The Assassination of Trotsky (1972) - executive producer
- Where Does It Hurt? (1972) - executive producer
- Alice's Adventures in Wonderland (1972) - executive producer
- The Spiral Staircase (1975) - executive producer
- The Sell-Out (1976) - producer
- Gulliver's Travels (1977) - executive producer
- Erotic Images (1983) - executive producer
- My Therapist (1983) - executive producer

=== Television ===
- The Californians (1957) - writer
- General Electric Theatre - producer
- The Untouchables (1959–61) - producer
- US Steel Hour (1961) - producer
- Straightaway (1961–1962 television series) - producer
- The Beachcomber (1962) - producer
- Summer Playhouse (1964) - producer
