= The Last Parable =

1953 novel by Alec Coppel

- First edition
- Author: Alec Coppel
- Language: English
- Genre: Character study
- Publisher: Arthur Barker
- Publication date: 1953
- Publication place: United Kingdom

The Last Parable is a 1953 novel by Alec Coppel about the life and times of a judge. It differed from much of Coppel's usual output in that it was not a murder mystery or comedy.

The book was banned in Ireland.
