= The Third Man (TV series) =

British-American TV series (1959–1965)

- Genre: Mystery
- Created by: Graham Greene
- Starring: Michael Rennie
- Countries of origin: United States; United Kingdom
- Original language: English
- No. of seasons: 4
- No. of episodes: 77 (6 missing)

Production
- Producer: Felix Jackson
- Running time: 30 minutes
- Production company: National Telefilm Associates

Original release
- Network: BBC; Syndication (USA)/NTA Film Network
- Release: 23 January 1959 – 1965

The Third Man is a television series which ran from 1959 to 1965. It was based on the novel and film The Third Man and starred Michael Rennie as Harry Lime. In the TV series, Lime is an international private investigator.

The series was a co-production between the NTA Film Network and the BBC. The first twenty episodes were shot at 20th Century Fox studios in Hollywood. Later episodes were filmed at Shepperton Studios and Associated-British Elstree Studios (Associated British Picture Corporation) in England.

Initially eight episodes were lost due to the BBC’s junking policy, but on 4 October 2024, the Film Is Fabulous project announced the episode "The Man Who Wouldn’t Talk" had been recovered and returned to the BBC archive. In addition, they announced the recovery of a version of "The Man With Two Left Hands", which was in better quality than the one that existed.

== Cast ==
- Michael Rennie as Harry Lime
- Jonathan Harris as Bradford Webster

== Episodes ==
=== Season 1 (1959–60) ===
No. overall	No. in series	Title	Directed by	Written by	Original release date
1	1	"One Kind Word"	Cliff Owen	Iain MacCormick	2 October 1959
2	2	"The Man Who Died Twice"	Paul Stanley	A.J. Carothers	9 October 1959
3	3	"Death of an Overlord"	David Orrick McDearmon	David Swift	16 October 1959
4	4	"The Best Policy"	Julian Amyes	John Player	23 October 1959
5	5	"The Indispensable Man"	Paul Stanley	Jack Laird	30 October 1959
6	6	"Sparks from a Dead Fire"	Paul Stanley	Robert Yale Libott	6 November 1959
7	7	"Three Dancing Turtles"	Julian Amyes	John Kruse	13 November 1959
8	8	"Hollywood Incident"	Paul Stanley	Richard Berg	20 November 1959
9	9	"A Question of Price"	David Orrick McDearmon	Harry Brown	27 November 1959
10	10	"The Importance of Being Harry Lime"	Julian Amyes	Iain MacCormick	4 December 1959
11	11	"Barcelona Passage"	Cliff Owen	Gilbert Winfield	18 December 1959
12	12	"Listen for the Sound of a Witch"	Arthur Hiller	Hagar Wilde	1 January 1960
13	13	"A Collector's Item"	Julian Amyes	John Player	8 January 1960
14	14	"How to Buy a Country"	Paul Stanley	Robert Yale Libott & A.J. Carothers	15 January 1960
15	15	"Dinner in Paris"	Anthony Bushell	Iain MacCormick	22 January 1960
16	16	"The Third Medallion"	Paul Stanley	Milton Gelman	29 January 1960
17	17	"The Angry Young Man"	Arthur Hiller	Richard Berg	5 February 1960
18	18	"High Finance"	Julian Amyes	Anthony Steven	12 February 1960
19	19	"Castle in Spain"	Arthur Hiller	Stanford Whitmore	19 February 1960
20	20	"Toys of the Dead"	Anthony Bushell	John Kruse	26 February 1960
21	21	"The Girl Who Didn't Know"	Arthur Hiller	Iain MacCormick	4 March 1960
22	22	"A Deal in Oils"	Julian Amyes	Alun Falconer	11 March 1960
23	23	"A Man Takes a Trip"	Paul Stanley	Jameson Brewer	25 March 1960
24	24	"A Pocketful of Sin"	Arthur Hiller	László Görög	1 April 1960
25	25	"The Man Who Wouldn't Talk"	Anthony Bushell	John Player	8 April 1960
26	26	"The Tenth Symphony"	Anthony Bushell	Iain MacCormick	23 April 1960
27	27	"Trouble at Drill Hill"	David Orrick McDearmon	David Swift	13 May 1960
28	28	"The Man with Two Left Hands"	Julian Amyes	John Warwick	27 May 1960
29	29	"As the Twig Is Bent"	Arthur Hiller	David Chandler	3 June 1960
30	30	"A Box of Eyes"	Julian Amyes	John Kruse	10 June 1960
31	31	"An Experiment with Money"	Julian Amyes	Margot Bennett	24 June 1960
32	32	"Broken Strings"	Paul Stanley	Richard Collins & Milton Gelman	1 July 1960
33	33	"Five Hours to Kill"	Arthur Hiller	Oliver Crawford	8 July 1960
34	34	"The Widow Who Wasn't"	Anthony Bushell	Lindsay Galloway	15 July 1960
35	35	"Death in Small Instalments"	Julian Amyes	Rex Rientis	22 July 1960
36	36	"Harry Lime and the King"	Anthony Bushell	John Graeme	29 July 1960
37	37	"Dark Island"	Paul Stanley	Ed Adamson	5 August 1960
38	38	"Confessions of an Honest Man"	Paul Stanley	Merwin Gerard	12 August 1960
39	39	"An Offering of Pearls"	Cliff Owen	Margot Bennett	19 August 1960

=== Season 2 (1962–63) ===
No. overall	No. in series	Title	Directed by	Written by	Original release date
40	1	"A Question of Libel"	Stuart Burge	Graham Greene & John Warwick	2 July 1962
41	2	"Mischka"	Robert M. Leeds	Graham Greene, Tom Gries, & Mary C. McCall Jr.	9 July 1962
42	3	"The Cross of Candos"	Robert M. Leeds	Graham Greene & Ben Perry	16 July 1962
43	4	"Happy Birthday"	Paul Henreid	Graham Greene & Philip Saltzman	13 August 1962
44	5	"Queen of the Nile"	Paul Henreid	Graham Greene & Robert Sherman	20 August 1962
45	6	"Calculated Risk"	Paul Henreid	Mary C. McCall Jr. & Fred Schiller	30 March 1963
46	7	"No Word for Danger"	Robert M. Leeds	Vincent Tilsley	6 April 1963
47	8	"Lord Bradford"	Robert M. Leeds	Anthony Steven & Vincent Tilsley	13 April 1963
48	9	"King's Ransom"	David MacDonald	Anthony Steven	20 April 1963
49	10	"Hamburg Shakedown"	John Newland	John Kruse & Mary McCall	27 April 1963
50	11	"The Unexpected Mr. Lime"	Robert M. Leeds	Peter Yeldham	4 May 1963
51	12	"Diamond in the Rough"	Paul Henreid	Richard Levinson & William Link	11 May 1963
52	13	"Portrait of Harry"	Robert M. Leeds	John Player	18 May 1963
53	14	"Man in Power"	Robert M. Leeds	Robert Leslie Bellem	25 May 1963
54	15	"Meeting of the Board"	Paul Henreid	Robert Sherman	8 June 1963
55	16	"Hansel and Son"	Robert M. Leeds	Lee Berg & Mary C. McCall Jr.	15 June 1963
56	17	"Act of Atonement"	Robert M. Leeds	Robert Sherman	13 July 1963
57	18	"Ghost Town"	Robert M. Leeds	Richard Levinson & William Link	27 July 1963
58	19	"Gold Napoleons"	Robert M. Leeds	P.K. Palmer	3 August 1963
59	20	"Bradford's Dream"	Robert M. Leeds	Anthony Steven & Vincent Tilsley	10 August 1963
60	21	"The Way of McEagle"	David MacDonald	John Player	17 August 1963
61	22	"Who Killed Harry Lime?"	Robert M. Leeds	Philip Saltzman	24 August 1963

=== Season 3 (1964) ===
No. overall	No. in series	Title	Directed by	Written by	Original release date
62	1	"A Question in Ice"	Robert M. Leeds	John Warwick	27 June 1964
63	2	"I.O.U."	Robert M. Leeds	Leslie Edgley (as Robert Bloomfield)	4 July 1964
64	3	"A Crisis in Crocodiles"	Robert M. Leeds	John Warwick	1 August 1964
65	4	"Judas Goat"	Paul Henreid	Robert Sherman	8 August 1964
66	5	"A Little Knowledge"	Robert M. Leeds	Raymond Bowers	15 August 1964
67	6	"The Day of the Bullfighter"	Paul Henreid	Philip Saltzman	22 August 1964
68	7	"Mars in Conjunction"	John Ainsworth	Phyllis White & Robert White	5 September 1964
69	8	"The Big Kill"	Paul Henreid	Robert Sherman	12 September 1964
70	9	"Frame Up"	Paul Henreid	Gene Wang	26 September 1964

=== Season 4 (1965) ===
No. overall	No. in series	Title	Directed by	Written by	Original release date
71	1	"The Trial of Harry Lime"	Robert M. Leeds	Michael Gilbert	16 July 1965
72	2	"Members Only: Part 1"	Robert M. Leeds	Unknown	23 July 1965
73	3	"Members Only: Part 2"	Robert M. Leeds	Unknown	30 July 1965
74	4	"The House of Bon-Bons"	Robert M. Leeds	John Kruse	6 August 1965
75	5	"The Man at the Top"	John Llewellyn Moxey	John Warwick	13 August 1965
76	6	"Proxy Fight"	Unknown	Unknown	20 August 1965
77	7	"The Luck of Harry Lime"	Paul Henreid	Gene Wang	27 August 1965

== Archive status ==
Out of a total of 77 episodes, 6 are currently missing: three from the first series, two from the second series & one from the fourth. On 4 October 2024 the Film Is Fabulous project announced the recovery of "The Man Who Wouldn't Talk", which brought the number of missing episodes down from eight to seven. They also announced they had located a 16mm film recording of "The Man With Two Left Hands" which was a significant improvement on the poor-quality domestic videotape copy previously known to exist. In 2025 the Film is Fabulous initiative announced the recovery of series 4 episode 6 "Proxy Fight" as part of their 'Recovered' event, which showcased programmes recovered by the initiative.

- Series 1 Episode 05 30.10.1959 "The Indispensable Man"
- Series 1 Episode 22 11.03.1960 "A Deal in Oils"
- Series 1 Episode 23 25.03.1960 "A Man Takes a Trip"
- Series 2 Episode 07 06.04.1963 "No Word for Danger"
- Series 2 Episode 08 13.04.1963 "Lord Bradford"
- Series 4 Episode 05 13.08.1965 "The Man at the Top"
