= Alec Coppel =

Australian writer (1907–1972)

- Born: 17 September 1907; Melbourne, Victoria, Australia
- Died: 22 January 1972 (aged 64); England
- Occupations: Screenwriter, novelist and playwright
- Writing career
- Period: 1935–1971

Alec Coppel (17 September 1907 – 22 January 1972) was an Australian-born screenwriter, novelist and playwright. He spent the majority of his career in London and Hollywood, specialising in light thrillers, mysteries and sex comedies. He is best known for the films Vertigo (1958), The Captain's Paradise (1953), Mr Denning Drives North (1951) and Obsession (1949), and the plays I Killed the Count and The Gazebo.

== Biography ==
=== Early life ===
Coppel was born in Melbourne and attended Wesley College. He moved to England in the 1920s to study medicine at Cambridge University, but dropped out before graduating and went to work in advertising, writing in his spare time. Coppel's first stage plays were Short Circuit (1935) and The Stars Foretell (1936).

=== I Killed the Count ===
His first big success was his play I Killed the Count (1937), which had a successful run in the West End. Coppel turned it into a novel (1939), screenplay and radio play. It also led to him receiving screenwriting offers.

His script credits include Over the Moon (1939), the film version of I Killed the Count (1939), and Just like a Woman (1939). Coppel contributed to the book of a revue, Let's Pretend (1940), and wrote a new play, Believe It or Not (1940).

=== Return to Australia ===
Coppel returned to Australia in 1940 for his "health". While there he and Kathleen Mary Robinson founded Whitehall Productions, operating out of the Minerva Theatre in Kings Cross.

The first play they presented there was the world premiere of Coppel's Mr Smart Guy (1941). The huge theatre was seldom full but they staged two plays every night. Coppel also wrote for radio and contributed to the script of Smithy (1946), one of the few feature films made in Australia during this time.

=== Return to London ===
Coppel moved back to London in 1944 after he and Robinson disagreed. He was replaced by Roland Walton. Coppel continued to alternate between novels, plays and screenplays.

His plays included My Friend Lester (1947) and A Man About a Dog (1949). His scripts included Brass Monkey (1948), Woman Hater (1948), Obsession (1949) (based on A Man About a Dog), Two on the Tiles (1951), and Smart Alec (1951) (based on Mr Smart Guy).

Coppel was hired to rewrite some scenes on No Highway in the Sky (1951) starring James Stewart and wrote Mr. Denning Drives North (1951) based on his own novel.

He became the first Australian to receive an Academy Award nomination for screenwriting with The Captain's Paradise, which was nominated for Best Story in 1953. That year he published a novel The Last Parable (1953).

Coppel was used by Warwick Pictures on Hell Below Zero (1954) and The Black Knight (1954); like No Highway and Captain's Paradise they were British films with American stars and Coppel wanted to work in Hollywood.

=== Move to Hollywood ===
Coppel moved to Los Angeles in 1954, where he wrote a number of scripts. He did some uncredited work on To Catch a Thief (1955) and did the thriller Appointment with a Shadow (1957). With Samuel A. Taylor, Coppel supplied the screenplay for Vertigo (1958), based on the Boileau-Narcejac novel D'entre les morts.

He wrote the plays The Genius and the Goddess (1957) and The Joshua Tree (1958), and saw The Captain's Paradise adapted into a musical as Oh, Captain! (1958). He had a big hit with The Gazebo (1959), based on a story by Coppel and his wife; this was later filmed although someone else did the screenplay. Coppel adapted The Captain's Paradise (1961) for stage and did a swashbuckler for MGM Swordsman of Siena (1962).

=== Later career ===
He spent the 1960s mostly working in Europe and London. He adapted his own story "Laughs with a Stranger" into Moment to Moment (1966). Coppel did some uncredited work on the script for Taste of Excitement to make it more of a comedy; director Don Sharp, who knew Coppel from Australia, said the writer's work was unhelpful.

Coppel's last two credits were a pair of sex comedies co-written with Denis Norden, The Bliss of Mrs. Blossom and The Statue, based on his play Chip Chip Chip.

He also wrote the plays Not in My Bed, You Don’t (1968), Cadenza and A Bird in the Nest and the TV play A Kiss is Just a Kiss (1971).

=== Personal life ===
Coppel died of colon cancer on 22 January 1972, in London.

He was married twice. He is survived by his son Chris Coppel who lives in the UK and continues to represent his father's works.

== Partial filmography ==
Year	Title	Director	Notes
1937	Over the Moon	Thornton Freeland	Co-screenplay
1939	I Killed the Count	Frederic Zelnik	Screenplay, based on his play
1939	Just Like a Woman	Paul L. Stein	Co-screenplay
1946	Smithy	Ken G. Hall	Co-screenplay
1948	Brass Monkey	Thornton Freeland	Screenplay
1948	Woman Hater	Terence Young	Based on short story
1949	Obsession	Edward Dmytryk	Screenplay, dialogue director; based on his novel, A Man About a Dog
1950	Two on the Tiles	John Guillermin	Screenplay
1951	Smart Alec	John Guillermin	Screenplay, based on his play Mr Smart Guy
1951	No Highway in the Sky	Henry Koster	Co-screenplay
1951	Mr. Denning Drives North	Anthony Kimmins	Screenplay, based on his novel
1953	The Captain's Paradise	Anthony Kimmins	Co-screenplay
1954	Hell Below Zero	Mark Robson	Co-screenplay
1954	The Black Knight	Tay Garnett	Co-screenplay
1954	To Catch a Thief	Alfred Hitchcock	Uncredited contribution to script
1957	Appointment with a Shadow	Richard Carlson	Screenplay
1958	Vertigo	Alfred Hitchcock	Co-screenplay
1959	The Gazebo	George Marshall	Based on his play
1962	Swordsman of Siena	Étienne Perier	Co-screenplay
1966	Moment to Moment	Mervyn LeRoy	Co-screenplay
1968	The Bliss of Mrs. Blossom	Joseph McGrath	Co-screenplay, based on his play A Bird in the Nest
1971	The Statue	Rod Amateau	Co-screenplay, based on his play Chip, Chip, Chip
1971	Jo	Jean Girault	French film. Based on his play The Gazebo

=== Unused screenplays ===
- The Chinese Room
- The List of Adrian Messenger

== Plays ==
- Short Circuit (1935)
- The Stars Foretell (1936)
- I Killed the Count (1937)
- Let's Pretend (1938) – contributed to book of a revue
- Believe It or Not (1940)
- Mr Smart Guy (1941)
- Saturday's Child (1946)
- My Friend Lester (1947)
- A Man About a Dog (1949)
- The Genius and the Goddess (1957)
- The Joshua Tree (1958) – from a story by Myra and Alec Coppel
- Oh, Captain! (1958) – based on his story only
- The Gazebo (1959) – from a story by Myra and Alec Coppel
- Viva Le Difference (1960)
- The Captain's Paradise (1961)
- Not in My Bed, You Don’t (1968) – with Myra Coppel
- Cadenza (1977)
- A Bird in the Nest
- Chip, Chip, Chip

== TV plays ==
- Guests for Dinner (1956) – episode of Alcoa Theatre
- A Kiss Is Just a Kiss (1971)

== Novels ==
- I Killed the Count (London: Blackie, 1939)
- A Man About a Dog (London: George G Harrap and Company Ltd, 1947) (US: Over the Line)
- Mr. Denning Drives North (London: George G Harrap & Co Ltd, 1950)
- The Last Parable (London: Arthur Baker, 1953)
- Moment to Moment (Greenwich: Fawcett Publications, 1966)
- Tweedledum and Tweedledee (London: Geoffrey Bles, 1967)

== Radio plays ==
- A Rum Affair (1941)
- Mr Smart Guy (1941)
- Murder Scrapbook (1950)

=== Unmade projects ===
- Peace in Our Time (1940) – British film
