= Mr. Denning Drives North =

1951 film by Anthony Kimmins

- UK theatrical poster
- Directed by: Anthony Kimmins
- Written by: Alec Coppel
- Based on: Mr. Denning Drives North by Alec Coppel
- Produced by: Anthony Kimmins; Stephen Mitchell
- Starring: John Mills; Phyllis Calvert; Herbert Lom; Eileen Moore
- Cinematography: John Wilcox
- Edited by: Gerald Turney-Smith
- Music by: Benjamin Frankel
- Production company: London Films Productions
- Distributed by: British Lion Films
- Release date: 18 December 1951
- Running time: 93 minutes
- Country: United Kingdom
- Language: English
- Box office: £70,197 (UK)

Mr. Denning Drives North is a 1951 British mystery film directed by Anthony Kimmins and starring John Mills, Phyllis Calvert and Sam Wanamaker. Alec Coppel wrote the script, adapted from his own 1950 novel of the same title. An aircraft manufacturer accidentally kills his daughter's boyfriend and tries to dispose of the body.

== Plot ==
Wealthy aircraft manufacturer Tom Denning and his wife Kay have a daughter, Liz, who is having an affair with Mados, an international crook. Denning meets Mados in an attempt to get him away from his daughter, but accidentally kills him with a punch when Mados falls and strikes his head. Instead of calling the police, Denning disposes of the body in a ditch. He tries to disguise the identity of the body by placing a large ornate ring on a finger. A gipsy finds the body and steals the ring. Later, torn with his guilt, Denning goes back to pick up the body only to find that it has disappeared.

== Cast ==
- John Mills as Tom Denning
- Phyllis Calvert as Kay Denning
- Eileen Moore as Liz Denning
- Sam Wanamaker as Chick Eddowes
- Herbert Lom as Mados
- Raymond Huntley as Wright
- Russell Waters as Harry Stoper
- Wilfrid Hyde-White as Woods
- Freda Jackson as Ma Smith
- Trader Faulkner as Ted Smith
- Sheila Shand Gibbs as Matilda
- Bernard Lee as Inspector Dodds
- Michael Shepley as Chairman of Court
- Ronald Adam as coroner
- John Stuart as Wilson
- Hugh Morton as Inspector Snell
- David Davies as chauffeur
- Ambrosine Phillpotts as Miss Blade
- Herbert C. Walton as Yardley
- John Stevens as first patrolman
- Lyn Evans as Mr Fisher
- John Warren as Mr Ash
- Raymond Francis as Clerk of the Court
- Edward Evans as second patrolman

== Production ==
Film rights were bought by Alexander Korda's London Films. John Mills's casting was announced in May 1951. It was Mills's first film in almost two years. At one stage Dane Clark and Patricia Roc were reportedly going to support Mills.

Sam Wanamaker had been living in England since 1949 and was offered the part after writing to his agent from holiday in France asking if any jobs were going.

The film was made at Shepperton Studios. The sets were designed by the art director John Elphick.

Instead of credits appearing on screen at the beginning of the film, a narrator announces the film's title, and then reads out the list of actors' names.

== Reception ==
=== Box office ===
The film performed poorly at the British box office.

=== Critical reception ===
The Monthly Film Bulletin wrote: "The plot is excessively complicated, depends very largely on coincidence, and makes the remarkable assumption that a man who apparently feels no guilt about his crime should be worried almost to the point of a breakdown by the fact that he appears to have got away with it, and should deliberately begin an investigation likely to lead – as it nearly does – to his own arrest. ... The extreme unreality of the story is echoed in the characterisation; John Mills has a foolish and unpredictable part, played at least with technical assurance; Phyllis Calvert does little with the understanding wife, and the most enjoyable moments are those provided by Freda Jackson, as a tyrannical and avaricious queen of the gipsies."

The New York Times wrote: "this little melodrama serves as still another reminder, from a country that jolly well knows how to exercise it, that restraint can work minor wonders [...] Persuasive and tingling, minus one false note [...] No doubt about it. The British have what it takes."

Variety reviewed the film in 1951 calling it "unconvincing and involved" where the direction was "completely inadequate." Two years later the magazine reviewed it more favorably calling it "tense and skillfully developed."

The Washington Post thought the Rolls-Royce "made more sense than any of the alleged human characters [...] a bit pretentious."

Leslie Halliwell said: "Initially suspenseful but finally disappointing melodrama which seems to lack a twist or two."

In British Sound Films: The Studio Years 1928–1959 David Quinlan rated the film as "average", writing: "Film walks tightrope between comedy and suspense with varying success."
