= The Assassination of Trotsky =

1972 film by Joseph Losey

- Film poster
- Directed by: Joseph Losey
- Screenplay by: Nicholas Mosley; Franco Solinas (uncredited)
- Produced by: Norman Priggen
- Starring: Richard Burton; Alain Delon; Romy Schneider; Valentina Cortese; Jean Desailly
- Cinematography: Pasqualino De Santis
- Edited by: Reginald Beck
- Music by: Egisto Macchi
- Production companies: Dino de Laurentiis Cinematografica; Compagnia Internazionale Alessandra Cinematografica; Cinétel
- Distributed by: Cinerama Releasing Corporation
- Release date: 20 April 1972
- Running time: 103 minutes
- Countries: Italy; France; United Kingdom
- Language: English
- Budget: £1 million ($2.4 million)
- Box office: 561,109 admissions (France)

The Assassination of Trotsky is a 1972 historical thriller film directed by Joseph Losey. It dramatizes the killing of exiled Soviet revolutionary Leon Trotsky by NKVD agent Frank Jacson in Mexico City in 1940. It stars Richard Burton as Trotsky and Alain Delon as Jacson, along with Romy Schneider, Valentina Cortese, and Jean Desailly.

The film was an Italian, French, and British co-production. It was released by Cinerama Releasing Corporation on April 20, 1972. It received generally negative reviews from critics.

== Plot ==
Exiled from the Soviet Union in 1929, Leon Trotsky travels from Turkey to France to Norway, before arriving in Mexico in January 1937. The film begins in Mexico City in 1940, during a May Day celebration. Trotsky has not escaped the attention of the Soviet dictator of the Soviet Union, Joseph Stalin, who sends out an assassin named Frank Jacson. The killer decides to infiltrate Trotsky's house by befriending one of the young communists in Trotsky's circle.

== Cast ==
- Richard Burton as Leon Trotsky
- Alain Delon as Frank Jacson
- Romy Schneider as Gita Samuels
- Valentina Cortese as Natalia Sedova Trotsky
- Luigi Vannucchi as Ruiz
- Jean Desailly as Alfred Rosmer
- Simone Valère as Marguerite Rosmer
- Duilio Del Prete as Felipe
- Jack Betts as Lou (credited as Hunt Powers)
- Michael Forest as Jim
- Claudio Brook as Roberto
- Joshua Sinclair as Sam
- Giorgio Albertazzi as Commissioner

== Production ==
In 1965, Josef Shaftel optioned the novel The Great Prince Died by Bernard Wolfe. The film was a co-production between the French Valoria Company and Dino De Laurentiis. It was originally to be shot in England, but was eventually filmed in Rome. The movie used Isaac Don Levine's book The Mind of an Assassin as a source.

According to author Melvin Bragg, the director Joseph Losey was so drunk and tired that he relied on long monologues by Burton to carry the film, in some cases even forgetting what was in the script. Burton himself wrote that he, or the continuity girl, would have to remind Losey of things that would have caused continuity gaffes.

== Reception ==
"The film offers only a sketchy account of Trotsky as a political figure. Losey's character is curiously disconnected from the past—his legendary association with Lenin, his sustained and prophetic criticism of Stalin, his importance as political thinker and orator are alluded to only briefly.—Biographer Foster Hirsch in Joseph Losey (1980).

Reviewer Vincent Canby registered dismay at the rejection of this "very fine film" by critics. He wrote that The Assassination of Trotsky is not a genuine biopic, but "a movie about an event." As such, "one doesn't come away from the theater full of someone else's ideas about Trotsky's place in Bolsheviks history, or about the ferment he caused among the Left Opposition of the 1930s and 1940s."

Canby considers the integration of passages from Trotsky's professional and personal papers into the dialogue to be particularly evocative. A Shakespearian theme may be detected in Losey's treatment, in "the peculiar bond between the victim and his assassin."

Making the general observation that Losey's oeuvre lacks "thematic continuity," critic Roger Greenspun at the New York Times praises The Assassination of Trotsky for its "audacity and imaginative density." Greenspun notes that there are numerous devices in the film "not to be excused, " among these the inclusion of "nostalgic Wordsworthian" excerpts from Trotsky's personal journals inserted into the script.

The reviewer adds that the makeup artists transformed the actors with "extraordinary accuracy" to resemble the historical figures they portray. Greenspun adds that "none seems more accurate than Valentina Cortese as Natalia Sedova, Trotsky's wife. Her role is comparatively small, but I think it is the loveliest performance in the movie."

The Monthly Film Bulletin wrote: "Disconcertingly, any summary of the bizarre circumstances of Trotsky's death – the old man, once a prime mover in great events, screened from the world behind walls and watch towers until his confrontation with his impenetrable executioner – reads like a parody of a Losey movie...the characters in Trotsky seem to belong to no specific place or time: their relationships are founded on no shared code or natural necessity, but on the absurd chances of war and on blind collisions arising from their attempts to heave obsessions into actions that will move and change the world outside."

== Retrospective appraisal ==
Critic Dan Callahan at Senses of Cinema registers this assessment: "The Assassination of Trotsky is an almost uniquely unappealing movie. The camerawork is uncertain and modish, and Richard Burton is ludicrously miscast as the Russian exile. Losey seems to be trying to mask his indifference to the subject by retreating into a numb loftiness."

Calling the film "a cold, unpleasant work," arts editor David Walsh at the World Socialist Web Site disparages Losey's characterization of the historical Trotsky: "Richard Burton is directed to play Trotsky as a pedantic, self-important and irritable windbag."

In contrast to his critique of Burton's performance, critic Foster Hirsch confers fulsome praise on actor Alain Delon, in the role depicting Stalinist assassin Ramón Mercader (under his alias Frank Jacson in the film version):

As the assassin, Alain Delon gives what is probably his finest performance, cold-eyed, wary, a figure of insinuating nervous energy. And yet, as he ingratiates himself with Trotsky, he becomes, in fleeting moments, an appealing character. We can understand Trotsky's attraction to him.

The Assassination of Trotsky was included as one of the choices in the book The Fifty Worst Films of All Time.

== Sources ==
- Canby, Vincent. 1972. "Why Is 'Trotsky' Dying?" New York Times,November 18, 1972. https://www.nytimes.com/1972/11/19/archives/why-is-trotsky-dying-why-is-a-movie-like-trotsky-dying.html Accessed 28 November 2024.
- Callahan, Dan. 2003. Losey, Joseph. Senses of Cinema, March 2003. Great Directors Issue 25.https://www.sensesofcinema.com/2003/greatdirectors/losey/#:~:text=The%20dominant%20themes%20of%20Losey's,love%20story%20in%20his%20films. Accessed 12 October, 2024.
- Greenspun, Roger. 1972. Film Fete: "Assassination of Trotsky." New York Times, October 14, 1972. https://www.nytimes.com/1972/10/14/archives/film-fete-assassination-of-trotsky.html Accessed 29 November, 2024.
- Hirsch, Foster. 1980. Joseph Losey. Twayne Publishers, Boston, Massachusetts. ISBN 0-8057-9257-0
- Walsh, David. 2016. The Chosen, on Trotsky, and other political subjects. World Socialist Web Site, September 29, 2016. https://www.wsws.org/en/articles/2016/09/29/tff2-s29.html Accessed 14 October, 2024.
