= Over the Moon (1939 film) =

1939 film by Thornton Freeland

- Directed by: Thornton Freeland; William K. Howard (uncredited)
- Screenplay by: Anthony Pelissier; Alec Coppel; Arthur Wimperis
- Story by: Lajos Bíró; Robert E. Sherwood
- Produced by: Alexander Korda
- Starring: Merle Oberon; Rex Harrison; Ursula Jeans
- Cinematography: Harry Stradling Sr.
- Edited by: Pat Wooley
- Music by: Mischa Spoliansky
- Color process: Technicolor
- Production company: London Film Productions
- Distributed by: United Artists
- Release date: 19 October 1939 (UK)
- Running time: 78 min.
- Country: United Kingdom
- Language: English
- Budget: £264,242

Over the Moon is a 1939 British Technicolor comedy film directed by Thornton Freeland and starring Merle Oberon, Rex Harrison, Ursula Jeans and Herbert Lomas. It was written by Anthony Pelissier, Alec Coppel and Arthur Wimperis.

== Plot ==
Jane Benson falls for local Yorkshire doctor Freddie Jarvis. Freddie sells his practice to avoid spending their married life in Yorkshire. Before they can leave, Jane suddenly inherits £18,000,000. Eager to experience high society, she hires two professional hostesses to guide her, leaving Freddie embarrassed at becoming "Mr. Jane Benson." During their separation, Jane is pursued by two fortune hunters and an even wealthier suitor, while Freddie takes a position at an elite sanatorium. Eventually, the estranged lovers reunite.

== Cast ==
- Merle Oberon as Jane Benson
- Rex Harrison as Dr. Freddie Jarvis
- Ursula Jeans as Millie
- Robert Douglas as John Flight (credited as playing The Unknown Man)
- Louis Borel as Pietro (credited as Louis Borrell)
- Zena Dare as Julie
- Peter Haddon as Lord Petcliffe
- David Tree as journalist
- Mackenzie Ward as Guy
- Elisabeth Welch as cabaret singer
- Carl Jaffe as Michel
- Herbert Lomas as Ladbrooke
- Wilfred Shine as Frude
- Gerald Nodin as Cartwright
- Evelyn Ankers as patient (uncredited)
- Ethel Griffies as Miss Bates (uncredited)
- Wilfrid Hyde-White as Dwight, the sanitarium spokesman (uncredited)
- Andreas Malandrinos as father on train (uncredited)

== Reception ==
The Monthly Film Bulletin wrote: "This slight and frothy story is put over with lavish trimmings and sophisticated dialogue. A real problem is presented, but no attempt is made to solve it, since the conventional happy ending simply leaves it in the air. ... Merle Oberon makes a gay and charming heroine. She is given few opportunities for acting. Rex Harrison strolls through the part of Freddie pleasantly and placidly, and bears no resemblance whatever to a country doctor. The parts of the young philanderers and the two women who sponge on Jane are over-drawn, and are caricatures rather than characters."

Kine Weekly wrote: "Lavishly mounted romantic comedy, photographed in Technicolor, depicting a sweet young thing's swift journey from comparative poverty to colossal affluence. There is very little backbone to the story and less point, but as a fashion parade and spectacular itinerary of society show places at home and abroad the picture has feminine appeal. In a word, it does nothing, with elegance if not with wit."

Variety wrote: "An admirable cast, good photography, clever character types and an all-round elaborate production are found in Over the Moon. Story is conventional but exceptionally well worked out via witty dialog, though the popular-priced patron may find it a little above his head. Smartly directed, it could stand cutting in some spots, however "
