= I Killed the Count =

1937 play by Alec Coppel

- Written by: Alec Coppel
- Original language: English
- Setting: London

Premiere
- Date premiered: 10 December 1937
- Place premiered: Whitehall Theatre, London

I Killed the Count is a 1937 play by Alec Coppel. Its success launched Coppel's career.

== 1937 London production ==
=== Cast ===
- Eric Maturin as Count Victor Mattoni
- Athole Stewart as Viscount Sorrington
- Alec Clunes as Detective Raines
- Anthony Hollesas Samuel Diamond
- Kathleen Harrison as Polly
- George Merritt as Divisional Inspector Davidson
- Meriel Forbes as Renee La Lune
- Barbara Francis as Louise Rogers
- Edward Petley as Johnson
- Hugh E. Wright as Mullet
- Anthony Bushell as Bernard K. Froy
- John Oxford as PC Clifton
- Frederick Cooper as Martin.

== 1942 Broadway production ==
The play was produced on Broadway in 1942.

== 1939 novelisation ==
A novelisation of the play was published in 1939.

== Radio adaptations ==
Wireless Weekly 15 Feb 1941

The play was adapted for Australian radio in 1941. Max Afford did the adaptation.

It was also adapted for BBC radio in 1938, 1945, 1950 (with Jack Hulbert), and 1962.

== 1948 BBC TV adaptation ==
A second adaptation I Killed the Count was made by the BBC in 1948. It was directed by Ian Atkins.

- Freda Bamford as Polly
- Philip Leaver as Count Victor Mattoni
- Frederick Bradshaw as Detective Sergeant Raines
- Frank Foster as Detective Inspector Davidson
- Erik Chitty as Martin
- Diarmuid Kelly as P.C. Clifton
- Olga Edwardes as Louise Rogers
- Mildred Shay as Renee la Lune
- Val Norton as Samuel Diamond
- Howard Douglas as Johnson
- Arthur Goulett
- Guy Kingsley Poynter as Bernard K. Froy
- Bruce Belfrage as Viscount Sorrington

== 1956 ITV TV adaptation ==
The play was adapted by ITV in 1956. The cast included Terence Alexander and Honor Blackman.

== 1957 Alfred Hitchcock Presents version ==
See I Killed the Count (Alfred Hitchcock Presents)

== 1959 Belgian TV version ==
The play was adapted for Belgian TV in 1959.
