= The Biggest Bundle of Them All =

1968 film by Ken Annakin

- Promotional film poster by Robert McGinnis
- Directed by: Ken Annakin
- Written by: Sy Salkowitz
- Produced by: Josef Shaftel; Sy Stewart
- Starring: Robert Wagner; Raquel Welch; Godfrey Cambridge; Vittorio De Sica; Edward G. Robinson
- Cinematography: Piero Portalupi
- Edited by: Ralph Sheldon
- Music by: Riz Ortolani
- Distributed by: Metro-Goldwyn-Mayer
- Release date: January 17, 1968
- Running time: 105 minutes
- Country: United States
- Language: English

The Biggest Bundle of Them All is a 1968 American crime film set in Naples, Italy. The story is about mobster Cesare Celli and a novice gang of crooks who team up to steal $5 million worth of platinum ingots from a train. The film stars Robert Wagner and Raquel Welch and was directed by Ken Annakin.

== Plot ==
An Italian gangster, Cesare Celli, formerly active in Chicago but now retired in his homeland of Italy, is kidnapped by Harry Price and his gang. Much to everyone's disappointment, none of Cesare's friends or associates is willing to pay a ransom to get him back.

His professional pride offended by this development, Cesare offers to assist Harry and girlfriend Juliana in pulling off a daring heist that could net them $5 million. Cesare even brings in criminal mastermind Professor Samuels to run the operation.

A Boeing B-17 Flying Fortress bomber is hijacked to be used to transport platinum ingots after a train robbery. Harry and the gang overcome many obstacles and the robbery is a great success, at least until the bomb bay doors open unexpectedly and the loot falls out.

== Cast ==
- Robert Wagner as Harry Price
- Raquel Welch as Juliana
- Godfrey Cambridge as Benny
- Davy Kaye as Davey
- Francesco Mulé as Antonio Tozzi
- Vittorio De Sica as Cesare Celli
- Edward G. Robinson as Professor Samuels
- Victor Spinetti as Captain Giglio
- Yvonne Sanson as Teresa
- Mickey Knox as Joe Ware
- Femi Benussi as Uncle Carlo's Wife
- Paola Borboni as Miss Rosa
- Aldo Bufi Landi as Captain Del Signore
- Carlo Croccolo as Franco
- Roberto De Simone as Uncle Carlo
- Piero Gerlini as Captain Capuano
- Giulio Marchetti as Lt. Naldi
- Andrea Aureli as Carabiniere
- Ermelinda De Felice as Emma
- Milena Vukotic as Angelina Pedrone
- Carlo Rizzo as Maitre d'Hotel
- Nino Vingelli as Restaurant Manager

== Production ==
Director Ken Annakin recalled that ten days into pre-production of the film, then titled The Italian Caper, a story reader from MGM discovered an old script in their archives that had the same story as the film, and that script was currently being filmed as The Happening by producer Sam Spiegel for Columbia Pictures. Producer Josef Shaftel met Spiegel with the result that he had to give up his 15% share of the profits, Spiegel had the power to approve every page of the shooting script, and the film, retitled The Biggest Bundle of Them All would not be released until six months after The Happening (which had a delayed release).

Filming began in April 1966. Female lead Raquel Welch had just made Fantastic Voyage and One Million Years B.C., but the latter had not been released. She signed to make Fathom while shooting Biggest Bundle.

"I didn't get to know Raquel Welch too well - we didn't have too many scenes together," said Edward G. Robinson. "I must say she has quite a body. She has been the product of a good publicity campaign. I hope she lives up to it because a body will only take you so far."

Male lead Robert Wagner was under contract to Universal who loaned him out to make the film.

The interior scenes were filmed at the Cinecittà studios in Rome. The movie was released in France as La Bande à César. The B-17 airplane used was B-17G-85VE 44-8846, an actual World War II combat veteran aircraft currently being flown by the Amicale Jean-Baptiste Salis Museum.

Annakin later recalled that Welch "tended to wing her lines a little bit and would keep us waiting, and I wasn't going to stand for any of this, so we had a big showdown quite early in the picture. I just said to her: `Unless you know your lines and come on time when you're called, I'm going to make sure I use you for the absolute minimum of time. I shan't do any closeups. I shall just do medium and long shots of you.' And, of course, being the woman she was, she was very co-operative after that!"

== Soundtrack ==
The opening song, "Most of All There's You", sung by Johnny Mathis was written by Riz Ortolani with lyrics by Norman Newell. The title song, "The Biggest Bundle of Them All" was sung by the Animals; it was co-written by Ritchie Cordell and Sal Trimachi.

== See also ==
- List of American films of 1968
- Train robbery
