= Golden Girl (film) =

1951 film by Lloyd Bacon

- Theatrical release poster
- Directed by: Lloyd Bacon
- Screenplay by: Walter Bullock; Charles O'Neal; Gladys Lehman
- Story by: Albert Lewis; Arthur Lewis; Edward Thompson (From a Story by)
- Produced by: George Jessel
- Starring: Mitzi Gaynor; Dale Robertson; Dennis Day; James Barton
- Narrated by: George Jessel
- Cinematography: Charles G. Clarke
- Edited by: Louis R. Loeffler
- Color process: Technicolor
- Production company: Twentieth Century-Fox
- Distributed by: Twentieth Century-Fox
- Release dates: November 20, 1951 (New York); November 21, 1951 (Los Angeles)
- Running time: 108 minutes
- Country: United States
- Language: English
- Box office: $1.5 million (US rentals)

Golden Girl is a 1951 American Musical Western film directed by Lloyd Bacon and starring Mitzi Gaynor, Dale Robertson, Dennis Day and James Barton. The film is loosely based on the life of famed entertainer Lotta Crabtree, who was known as the "Golden Girl".

The original song "Never," written by Lionel Newman and Eliot Daniel and sung by Dennis Day, earned the film its only Academy Award nomination.

== Plot ==
In her hometown of Grass Valley, vivacious teenager Lotta Crabtree is thrilled when the famed performer Lola Montez arrives in town in 1863. She wants to become a singer like Lola someday, although her parents Mary Ann and John Crabtree, who run a boarding house, do not approve. Lotta has two admirers: local boy Mart Taylor and older newcomer Tom Richmond, who is informed that Lotta is only 16. A boarder named Cornelius who has a surefire method for winning at roulette lures Lotta's father into a game. Her father loses all of his money as well as the boarding house.

Hoping to duplicate Lola Montez's great financial success singing in mining camps for men, Lotta embarks on a similar mission. The miners like her, but they will not throw gold pieces to her until she removes part of her costume. Lotta's father wins a San Francisco theater in a card game, and Lotta becomes a star there. She then travels to New York to perform but learns that Tom has been committing robberies to raise money for the Confederate army in the Civil War.

The war ends, but when Lotta sings "Dixie" on stage in New York, she receives a negative audience response. Mart appeases the crowd and begins to sing when Lotta is overcome with emotion. The audience gradually joins him until everyone is singing. Tom, who has been reported as near death from an injury, enters the theater, to Lotta's delight.

== Cast ==
- Mitzi Gaynor as Lotta Crabtree
- Dale Robertson as Tom Richmond
- Dennis Day as Mart Taylor
- James Barton as John Crabtree
- Una Merkel as Mary Ann Crabtree
- Raymond Walburn as Cornelius
- Gene Sheldon as Sam Jordan
- Carmen D'Antonio as Lola Montez

== Reception ==
In a contemporary review for The New York Times, critic A. H. Weiler wrote: "[T]he singer-dancer-actress is hardly fascinating but a fine figure of a girl, nevertheless. Beyond that, the company, which obviously was not attempting a definitive biography, only has fashioned an uninspired musical, lavishly daubed in Technicolor, whose music is not memorable. Miss Crabtree' s love life and songs and dances must have contained more gold and less corn than is shown in 'Golden Girl.'"

Critic Philip K. Scheuer of the Los Angeles Times wrote: "Mitzi Gaynor may in fact prove to be a 'golden girl' to 20th Century-Fox. ... Admiration grows with each new demonstration of her versatility—at singing songs solemn or silly, at dancing tap or toe, at spreading sunshine or shedding the ready tear. It remains to be discovered whether we can stop marveling at her as a star in the making long enough to believe in the characterization she is attempting."

== See also ==
- List of American films of 1951
