= Colorado C.I. =

- Genre: Crime; Drama; Mystery
- Written by: Robert W. Lenski
- Directed by: Virgil W. Vogel
- Starring: Christine Belford; Ann Bradley; Marshall Colt
- Music by: Dave Grusin
- Country of origin: United States
- Original language: English

Production
- Executive producer: Philip Saltzman
- Producer: Christopher Morgan
- Production location: Colorado
- Cinematography: Jacques R. Marquette
- Editor: Geoffrey Rowland
- Running time: 60 minutes
- Production company: Quinn Martin Productions

Original release
- Network: CBS
- Release: May 26, 1978

Colorado C.I. is a 1978 American made-for-television crime drama mystery film and was intended as a pilot for a series. The teleplay was written by Robert W. Lenski and the film directed by Virgil W. Vogel, with Christopher Morgan as the producer and Philip Saltzman as the Executive Producer. The film was broadcast on CBS on May 26, 1978.

Mark Gunnison (John Elerick) and Pete Gunnison (Marshall Colt) are brothers and undercover detectives of the elite Criminal Investigation Unit of the Colorado Police. The cast also included L.Q. Jones, Christine Belford, Van Williams, Laurette Sprang, David Hedison, William Lucking, Christine De Lisle, Randolph Powell, Lou Frizzell, John Karlen, George D. Wallace, Joan Roberts and Ann Bradley.

The film ran for 60 minutes in color with mono sound.

== Sources ==
- Goldberg, Lee (2015). Unsold Television Pilots, 1955-1989. CreateSpace Independent Publishing Platform. 828pp. ISBN 9781511590679.
- Terrace, Vincent (2013). Encyclopedia of Television Pilots, 1937-2012. McFarland. 380pp. ISBN 9781476602493.
