= The Swiss Conspiracy =

1977 film

- Directed by: Jack Arnold
- Written by: Norman Klenman; Philip Saltzman; Michael Stanley
- Produced by: Maurice Silverstein
- Starring: David Janssen; Senta Berger; Elke Sommer; John Ireland
- Cinematography: W.P. Hassenstein
- Music by: Klaus Doldinger
- Distributed by: S.J. International Pictures
- Release dates: 1976 (UK); September 1977 (US)
- Running time: 83 min.
- Countries: West Germany; United States
- Language: English

The Swiss Conspiracy is a 1976 action film directed by Jack Arnold and starring David Janssen, Senta Berger and Elke Sommer. It was co-produced between West Germany and the United States.

== Plot ==
A Swiss bank learns that the confidentiality of several anonymous numbered accounts has been compromised and blackmail threats have been made to five holders of the accounts. They include a crooked arms dealer, who received a demand for five million Swiss francs. He refuses to pay and is shot dead. The bank is also told to pay ten million francs to keep the accounts secret.

The bank hires David Christopher, a former U.S. Justice Department official who now resides in Geneva, to investigate. In the course of his investigation, Christopher talks to the four surviving people blackmailed – beautiful Zürich resident Denise Abbott, Texas businessman Dwight McGowan, Chicago crook Robert Hayes, and Dutchman Kosta.

He identifies a number of suspects. One is Rita Jensen, the mistress of the bank's vice-president, Franz Benninger. There is also Benninger himself as well as Korsak and Sando, who are out to kill Hayes and Christopher.

Bank president Johann Hurtil cannot believe that Benninger is corrupt. However, it emerges that the latter transferred control of a bank account to his mistress, who was legally entitled to it but didn't have the correct documents.

Captain Hans Frey of the Swiss Federal Police is suspicious of Christopher's activities and follows him.

The bank decides to pay the blackmailer, using uncut diamonds. Christopher insists on accompanying the diamonds to the collection point high in the snow-covered Alps. The blackmailees turn out to be blackmailing each other and the collector of the diamonds is shot, falling off a high alpine rock face. Christopher recovers the stones.

== Cast ==
- David Janssen as David Christopher
- Senta Berger as Denise Abbott
- John Ireland as Dwight McGowan
- John Saxon as Robert Hayes
- Ray Milland as Johann Hurtil
- Elke Sommer as Rita Jensen
- Anton Diffring as Franz Benninger
- Arthur Brauss as Andre Kosta
- Inigo Gallo as Captain Frey
- Curt Lowens as Korsak

== Production ==
The film was filmed entirely on location in and around Zurich.

== Reception ==
Time Out said of the film, ”A monotonous, glossily vacuous co-production thriller that sends Janssen skidding through the scenic snow in the midst of an incomprehensible blackmail-and-murder plot involving five shadowy Zurich account-holders.” As of October 2026 it holds a 29% audience rating on Rotten Tomatoes.
