= No Place to Hide (1956 film) =

1956 film by Josef Shaftel

No Place to Hide is a 1956 film directed, produced and written by Josef Shaftel. It stars Marsha Hunt and David Brian and was said to be the first film made "cooperatively between Hollywood and Philippine interests."
