= Herschel Burke Gilbert =

American composer of film and television scores (1918–2003)

- Born: April 20, 1918; Milwaukee, Wisconsin, US
- Died: June 8, 2003 (aged 85); Los Angeles, California, US
- Education: University of Wisconsin–Milwaukee; Juilliard School of Music
- Spouse: Trudy Gilbert
- Children: 4

Herschel Burke Gilbert (April 20, 1918 – June 8, 2003) was an American orchestrator, musical supervisor, and composer of film and television scores and theme songs, including The Rifleman (starring Chuck Connors), Dick Powell's Zane Grey Theater, and The Detectives. Gilbert once estimated that his compositions had been used in at least three thousand individual episodes of various television series.

== Early years and education ==
Gilbert was born in Milwaukee, Wisconsin, to Samuel Gilbert and Bertha Shevinsky, both born in the Russian Empire. At the age of nine, he began studying the violin in Shorewood in Milwaukee County. By the time he was 15, he had formed his own dance band. He attended Milwaukee State Teachers College (now University of Wisconsin–Milwaukee) and studied for four years: two as an undergraduate and two as a graduate, from 1939 to 1943 at the Juilliard School of Music in New York City. After Juilliard, Gilbert won a music scholarship to the Berkshire Music Festival in Massachusetts, where he studied under Aaron Copland and Leonard Bernstein. He also played the viola with bandleader Harry James.

== Television and film scoring ==
He composed many instrumental theme songs heard on American television through the 1950s and 1960s, including The Rifleman, Michael Shayne, The Lawless Years, Wanted: Dead or Alive, Stories of the Century, The Dick Powell Show, Four Star Playhouse, The DuPont Show with June Allyson, The Detectives Starring Robert Taylor, The Westerner, Mrs. G. Goes to College, Law of the Plainsman, Target: The Corruptors!, Man with a Camera, and Burke's Law. Many of these were TV series produced by Four Star Television when Gilbert was a music director.

In addition to the main theme songs, Gilbert also composed library music cues used in many TV series episodes, including episodes of Gunsmoke, The Big Valley, The Adventures of Superman, Leave It to Beaver, Johnny Ringo, Harrigan and Son, McKeever and the Colonel, Gilligan's Island and Perry Mason. During his library music years, he formed a publishing company named for his sons "John Paul Music" to collect ASCAP publisher royalties.

His film work includes It's a Wonderful Life (1947), The Jackie Robinson Story (1950), The Thief (1952), Carmen Jones (1954), It Came from Beneath the Sea (1954), Beyond a Reasonable Doubt (1956), No Place to Hide (1956), Comanche (1956), Slaughter On Tenth Avenue (1957), Sam Whiskey (1969), I Dismember Mama (1974), and The Witch Who Came from the Sea (1976).

== Later years ==
Gilbert died in Los Angeles from complications of a stroke.
