= The Fly (film series) =

American film series

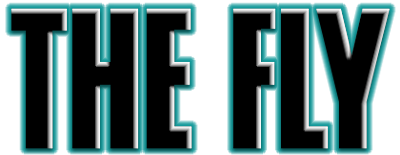
- Official film series logo
- Based on: Short story "The Fly" by George Langelaan
- Distributed by: 20th Century Studios
- Country: United States
- Language: English

The film series of The Fly is a sequence of science fiction-horror films, consisting of an original series started in 1958 and a remake series made in the 1980s. The first film of the series, The Fly, was produced and distributed by 20th Century Fox in 1958 as a colour film. The two following black and white sequels, Return of the Fly and Curse of the Fly, both produced by Associated Producers, were released in 1959 and 1965 respectively. The original film was remade in 1986, The Fly directed by David Cronenberg. The remake film received the Academy Award for Best Makeup in 1987. Its sequel, The Fly II, was released in 1989. All five films within the series were distributed by 20th Century Fox.

== Films ==
Film	U.S. release date	Director(s)	Screenwriter(s)	Producer(s)
Original series
The Fly	July 16, 1958	Kurt Neumann	James Clavell	Kurt Neumann
Return of the Fly	July 22, 1959	Edward Bernds	Edward Bernds	Bernard Glasser
Curse of the Fly	May 1965	Don Sharp	Harry Spalding	Robert L. Lippert and Jack Parsons
Remake series
The Fly	August 15, 1986	David Cronenberg	David Cronenberg and Charles Edward Pogue	Stuart Cornfeld
The Fly II	February 10, 1989	Chris Walas	Mick Garris, Ken Wheat, Jim Wheat and Frank Darabont	Steven-Charles Jaffe
Untitled The Fly film	TBA	Nikyatu Jusu	Nikyatu Jusu	TBA

=== Original series ===
==== The Fly (1958) ====
The screenplay of the first film is based on a short story of the same name written by George Langelaan in 1957, presenting a scientist, André Delambre (David Hedison), who accidentally mixes his molecules with a fly in an experiment of his new invention, a matter transference device, and therefore transforms into a human-fly hybrid monster, leading to a series of inevitable tragedies.

==== Return of the Fly (1959) ====
Years after the first film, Phillipe Delambre (Brett Halsey), the son of the scientist who turned in to human-fly hybrid, has become an adult and decides to complete the work of his deceased father: the experiment on the matter transporter. He hires Alan Hines (David Frankham), who then turns out to be an industrial spy by the name of Ronald Holms, to help with the experiment. As the experiment going on the right track, Ronald's true intention begins to be uncovered.

==== Curse of the Fly (1965) ====
Martin Delambre (George Baker) encounters a beautiful young girl, Patricia Stanley (Carole Gray), one night on his way to Montreal. The loving couple soon get married, but they are both keeping horrible secrets from each other: Patricia was actually escaping from an asylum the night they met; and Martin is secretly experimenting on a teleportation project which has already made numerous victims with his father, Henri Delambre (Brian Donlevy). With Patricia being tracked down, secrets of the couple are facing the risk of getting revealed.

=== Remake series ===
==== The Fly (1986) ====
Scientist Seth Brundle (Jeff Goldblum), has successfully invented a teleportation device which can disintegrate matter in one "Telepod" and reintegrate it in another. Journalist Veronica "Ronnie" (Geena Davis) agrees to document Seth's project, and the two become lovers. One night, Seth rashly decides to test the process on himself, but fails to notice a common housefly which has slipped into the transmitter pod with him. The computer becomes confused by the fly's presence, and merges it with Seth at the genetic level. Unaware of the accident, Seth initially believes that his newly increased strength and energy are a result of the teleportation process purifying and improving his body, but his behavior soon becomes arrogant and violent. Veronica notices the disturbing changes in Seth's personality, whose body begins a prolonged and grotesque process of deteriorating into a human-insect hybrid creature, which Seth dubs "Brundlefly". Ronnie and the diseased Seth must both cope with the effects of his transformation on their relationship, while Seth desperately searches for a cure before his humanity—and his sanity—completely drain away.

==== The Fly II (1989) ====
The sequel continues the story, with Veronica Quaife dying in the process of giving birth to Seth Brundle's mutant son. The child, named Martin Brundle (Eric Stoltz), is adopted by Anton Bartok (Lee Richardson), the head of Bartok Industries and sponsor of Seth's experiment. Martin's unique heritage (which he is kept unaware of) results in his suffering from rapid aging, but also provides him with a photographic memory and no need for sleep. Physically a grown adult by his fifth birthday, Martin is given the task of repairing his father's Telepods by Bartok, and also falls in love with Bartok employee Beth Logan (Daphne Zuniga). However, Bartok has ulterior motives for his seeming kindness toward Martin: he intends to use the Telepods' ability to gene-splice for nefarious purposes, and has been aware from the start that Martin will eventually mutate into a human-fly hybrid creature. Martin and Beth must race against time to escape from Bartok and find a way to cure Martin before he suffers the same grotesque fate as his father.

==== Untitled The Fly film ====
In November 2024, it was revealed that a film set in Cronenberg's The Fly universe was in development with Nikyatu Jusu serving both as writer and director.

== Cast and characters ==
Characters	Original series			Remake series		
Characters	The Fly	Return of the Fly	Curse of the Fly	The Fly	The Fly II	Untitled The Fly film
Characters	1958	1959	1965	1986	1989	TBA
André Delambre	David Hedison	David Hedison^{P}				
Hélène Delambre	Patricia Owens	Patricia Owens^{P}				
François Delambre	Vincent Price	Vincent Price				
Philippe Delambre	Charles Herbert	Brett Halsey				
Inspector Charas	Herbert Marshall		Charles Carson			
Emma	Kathleen Freeman					
Nurse Anderson	Betty Lou Gerson					
Dr. Éjoute	Eugene Borden					
Gaston	Torben Meyer	Michael Mark				
Ronald Holmes / Alan Hinds		David Frankham				
Cecile Bonnard		Danielle De Metz				
Inspector Beecham		John Sutton				
Max Barthold		Dan Seymour				
Granville		Jack Daly				
Mme. Bonnard		Janine Grandel				
Sgt. Dubois		Richard Flato				
Inspector Evans		Pat O'Hara				
The Fly-Creature		Ed Wolff				
Henri Delambre			Brian Donlevy			
Martin Delambre			George Baker			
Patricia Stanley			Carole Gray			
Tai			Burt Kwouk			
Wan			Yvette Rees			
Albert Delambre			Michael Graham			
Judith Delambre			Mary Manson			
Inspector Ronet			Jeremy Wilkin			
Madame Fournier			Rachel Kempson			
Dr. Seth Brundle Brundlefly				Jeff Goldblum	Jeff Goldblum^{U}^{A}	
Veronica "Ronnie" Quaife				Geena Davis	Saffron Henderson Geena Davis^{P}	
Stathis Borans				John Getz	John Getz	
Tawny				Joy Boushel		
Dr. Brent Cheevers				Leslie Carlson		
Marky				George Chuvalo		
Gynecologist				David Cronenberg		
Martin Brundle Martinfly					Eric Stoltz Harley Cross^{Y} Matthew Moore^{Y} Rodney Clough Jr.^{Y} Sterling Cottingham^{I}	
Elisabeth "Beth" Logan					Daphne Zuniga	
Anton Bartok					Lee Richardson	
Dr. Shepard					Frank C. Turner	
Dr. Jainway					Ann Marie Lee	
Scorby					Garry Chalk	
Simms					Jerry Wasserman	

== Additional crew and production details ==
Film	Crew/Detail					
Film	Composer(s)	Cinematographer	Editor(s)	Production companies	Distributing company	Running time
The Fly	Paul Sawtell	Karl Struss	Merrill G. White	—N/a	20th Century Fox	96 mins
Return of the Fly	Bert Shefter & Paul Sawtell	Brydon Baker	Richard Meyer	Associated Producers Inc	20th Century Fox	80 mins
Curse of the Fly	Bert Shefter	Basil Emmott	Robert Winter	Lippert Pictures	20th Century Fox	86 mins
The Fly	Howard Shore	Mark Irwin	Ronald Sanders	Brooksfilms; SLM Production Group	20th Century Fox	96 mins
The Fly II	Christopher Young	Robin Vidgeon	Sean Barton	Brooksfilms	20th Century Fox	105 mins

== Production ==
=== Development ===
==== The Fly (1958) ====
The movie was based on the short story "The Fly" written by George Langelaan, which was published on Playboy magazine in 1957. According to Maury Dexter, an American producer who once worked with Robert Lippert, the novel was originally found and brought to the studio by Kurt Neuman. Although Robert Lippert was the one who brought the idea to 20th Century Fox and got its agreement on filming the movie, Fox replaced Lippert by Neuman as the producer afterwards due to Lippert's conflict with Screen Actors Guild. The Fly was then made in colour as a Fox film. James Clavell was hired by Lippert for the adaption of the screenplay, and his work, based on what Harry Spalding has said, was "the best draft" he has even seen.

The special effect of the human-fly hybrid was said to be created by covering the actor's head by a rubber sheath. To make the mask more alive, the original beaded domes as the eyes were made iridescent, and Hedison may wriggle his "proboscis" through a wooden plug held in his mouth. The budget was claimed to be $480,000 by Lippert, and $28,000 of which was spent on the construction of the laboratory set. The film was released in July 1958 and became the biggest hit of Fox that year, grossing $3,000,000 in domestically. However, Kurt did not witness the huge success of his work as he died from a heart attack few weeks after the release of the film.

==== Return of the Fly (1959) ====
Due to the success of its preceding work, Return of the Fly was created double-billed with The Alligator People and was released in 1959. The idea of making this sequel was first brought out by Harry Spalding. He recalled the screenplay was not easy to start since the first film "was a one-short deal, an accident" which was "not like a Frankenstein monster, someone you can revive". He then stated the budget of the film was higher than the normal $125,000, yet it turned out to be profitable. According to Bernard Glasser, the film's producer, their budget was then increased to $275,000. The movie was asked to move from an independent shooting lot to the studio of Fox by its production department, which gave the crew more autonomy over the production. Glasser also complained about the slow production pace of Fox, claiming that most of the money were spent unproductively, which made Lippert "have to obtain additional fund".

Because Ed Wolff, the Fly portrayer, had problem breathing wearing the Fly head, most of his action sequences were done by his stuntman, Joe Becker. The actor of the original "Fly", Vincent Price has also taken part in this sequel, being paid at $25,000. However, as Glasser recalled, he was "not overly enthusiastic about the screenplay".

==== Curse of the Fly (1965) ====
When Lippert first mentioned the idea of making a third Fly, Spalding was surprised and kind of reluctant, saying they were "lucky to be able to do a second one". Having Claude Rains in his mind as the main character, Spalding completed the script. Lippert however put Brian Donlevy in the role instead, since Donlevy has previously worked well in another horror film, Creeping Unknown, and Lippert wanted to stick to what has worked before. Spalding also pointed out the difficulty of writing the screenplay in Los Angeles for a production located in England due to the lack of collaboration between him and the director as well as the rest of the crew.

==== The Fly (1986) ====
In the early 1980s, producer Kip Ohman proposed to Charles Edward Pogue about the idea of remaking the classic sci-fi horror movie The Fly. After reading the original novel by George Langelaan and watching The Fly made in 1958, Pogue was very interested in the remake plan, therefore he found Stuart Cornfeld to work with 20th Century Fox. Pogue's initial idea of the screenplay was very similar to Langelaan's original work, but he and Cornfeld then felt the focus should be put on the protagonist's mutating process, not the final result of the mutation. Unexpectedly, the film script did not impress Fox, and the shooting intentions immediately fell through. After multiple negotiations, Fox finally agreed to distribute the film, only if Cornfeld and his crew raise the fund themselves.

Cornfeld found Mel Brooks to co-produce the film. The two had previously worked together in David Lynch's The Elephant Man. When Brooks and Confield began looking for the suitable director, their first choice was David Cronenberg, but he was busy with assisting Dino de Laurentis to prepare for Total Recall at the moment. After watching several short films made by Robert Bierman, Cornfeld decided to corporate with this young British director. When the pre-production of the film went on the right track, Bierman's daughter died in an accident. Brooks and Cornfeld waited for a month to let Bierman arrange the funeral and adjust his mood. But still, Bierman said that he could not resume his work in a short time. After three months, they had to cancel the contract. Knowing that Cronenberg had given up Total Recall, Cornfeld once again invited him. Cronenberg then agreed to be the director, but only if he could personally rewrite the script. The screenplay written by Cronenberg was very different, but it still retained the original basic plot and the core concept of genetic variation.

Since Cronenberg did not want to break the actions for the special effect, the optical effect department adopted the real-time motion control system to create a "moving lock-off shot". Hoyt Yeatman, the optical effect supervisor of The Fly, described the technology in the following way:

The shots were programmed by keyboard, and since they were working in real time, we didn't have to do move tests per se… … And once we got it down, then we'd do a number of takes with the object to be teleported in the booth. Then we would basically do nothing more than remove the object from the booth and redo the lights exactly as before: each time we had to change the globes and then we'd do another move. Then we'd use the motion control rig to repeat the shot exactly for the "B" side of the cut with the empty pod. At that point, we had two pieces of film with a common sync point - the first side being the "A" side containing the object, the second side or "B" side was the empty pod - and when you match those together in a synchroniser you can dissolve or pop between them and the move is exactly the same.

==== The Fly II (1989) ====
According to a journal Hollywood Reporter in 1989, while filming the 1986 remake of The Fly, Stuart Cornfeld noticed Chris Walas, the person who later won the 1987 Academy Award for his work as special effects makeup. He then recommended Walas to be the director of the sequence and contributed to Walas' collaboration with Brooksfilms, the company that produced both movies of the remake series. The Fly II therefore became the directorial debut of Walas. The shooting started in April 1988 and was done in Bridge Studios located in Vancouver, Canada, with a shooting schedule of 12 weeks.

==== Possible reboot ====
According to an interview in 2017 made by /Film with J. D. Dillard, the director of the American drama film Sleight, a plan of remaking David Cronenberg's The Fly was at its early phase of negotiations. Dillard disclosed in the interview that he might work with Alex Theurer, the co-writer of the movie Sleight, for the remake: "For me – and this would be about The Fly, but this is also about Alex and my approach to remakes because post-Sleight that has been the conversation for what a lot of big flashy studio gigs are – no matter what, we want to start with character". However, doubts on the possibility of the remake have been risen since the Disney/Fox merger taken place in 2019, owing to the well-known family-friendly Disney style. In March 2023 further news on the development of the possible reboot rumored that Zendaya was offered the role to star, with J.D. Dillard still attached to direct.

However on November 2024, a new reboot is confirmed to be in the works with Nikyatu Jusu to write and direct.

== Reception ==
=== The original series ===
As the first film of the whole series, The Fly received a mixed-to-positive reception. The Variety review credited its "unusual believability" as a strong factor, yet some critics held a relatively negative comment, for Ivan Butler commenting the film as "the most ludicrous, and certainly one of the most revolting science-horror films ever perpetrated". Michael J. Weldon wrote in his book The Psychotronic Encyclopedia of Film, describing the film as "brilliant, sick, absurd... Unforgettable". The film also has opened the path for Vincent Price as a horror movie actor who then collaborated with William Castle and Roger Corman and took part in many horror classics.

Return of the Fly has mostly received negative critics, receiving 38% rating on Rotten Tomatoes compared to the 95% rating received by is predecessor. Mass media regarded it as a sequel to "cash in on the latter's reputation as a grosser". Despite a short compliment of the film's special effect, Glen of the Variety critiqued it in his article for Berlin Film Festival reviews:

It's typical of writer-director Edward Bernds' script that this incredible and dreadful tale, told to the loving son himself on the day of his mother's funeral, should be made to seem almost banal for a lack of imaginative dialog and absence of appropriate tempo in the scene. What follows is one unmotivated episode after another, loosely tied to the theme that the son, in following in his father's footsteps, will come to the same bad end… …Without the reputation of The Fly to trade on, this one would be a dud.

Being the final film of the trilogy, Curse of the Fly received an overall negative public critic since most people were annoyed by this Fly movie with no "fly".

=== The remake series ===
In 1987, The Fly remake won the Academy Award for Best Makeup in credit of the work of the Makeup team led by Chris Walas and Stephan Dupuis. It was also nominated for the BAFTA Award for the Best Makeup and Hair as well as the Hugo Award for the Best Dramatic Presentation. Although the press favoured Jeff Goldblum's acting, and the Academy Awards entertained the possibility of nominating Goldblum for Best Actor, the situation never occurred.

The Fly II has received a 27% approval rating over 15 reviews and scored 23% for audience review on Rotten Tomato. Janet Maslin from The New York Times commented the final half hour of the film was "a series of slime-ridden, glop-oozing special effects" and Walas' directorial work as "competent but hardly clever". David Hughes from Empire Magazine described the story as "unimaginative", saying the movie was "not as tightly scripted or keenly directed as its parent".

=== Box office performance ===
Films	U.S. release date	Box office revenue			Budget
Films	U.S. release date	North America	International	Worldwide	Budget
The Fly	July 16, 1958	$3,000,000		$3,000,000	$480,000
Return of the Fly	July 1959				$275,000
Curse of the Fly	May 1965				$90,000
The Fly	August 15, 1986	$40,456,565	$20,172,594	$60,629,159	$15,000,000
The Fly II	February 10, 1989	$20,021,322	$18,881,857	$38,903,179	$12,500,000

=== Critical and public response ===
Film	Rotten Tomatoes	Metacritic	CinemaScore
The Fly	95% (38 reviews)	—N/a	—N/a
Return of the Fly	36% (14 reviews)	—N/a	—N/a
Curse of the Fly	—N/a	—N/a	—N/a
The Fly	93% (74 reviews)	79 (11 reviews)	B
The Fly II	27% (15 reviews)	36 (15 reviews)	—N/a

== Other media ==
=== Comic books ===
Beginning in March 2015 IDW Publishing released The Fly: Outbreak, a five-issue comic book miniseries written by Brandon Seifert. The story is a direct sequel to the events of The Fly II, and features Seth Brundle's son, Martin, inadvertently causing a transgenic outbreak while attempting to cure Anton Bartok, to whom he'd previously transferred his mutant genes at the end of The Fly II.
