= Jill Dixon =

English actress

- Born: 1932 (age 93–94); England
- Occupation: Actress
- Years active: 1954–1981

Jill Dixon (born 1932) is an English actress.

== Personal life and career ==
Jill Dixon was born in England in December 1932. She made her debut as an actress at the age of three, appearing as a water nymph at the London Hippodrome. Although she appeared in several films, the majority of Dixon's career were parts in television series and television films. Her last film was the 1964 horror film Witchcraft co-starring Lon Chaney, Diane Clare and Jack Hedley. Dixon also acted in various Shakespeare stage productions including Much Ado About Nothing, King Lear and Love's Labour's Lost.

== Filmography ==
- The Crowded Day (1954) as Jenny the maid
- Up in the World (1956) as Sylvia
- Checkpoint (1956) as Stewardess
- The Secret Place (1957) as Joan (uncredited)
- High Tide at Noon (1957) as Matille Trudeau
- Just My Luck (1957) as Anne
- A Night to Remember (1958) as Mrs Clarke
- Witchcraft (1964) as Tracy Lanier

=== TV ===
- The Queen Came By – TV film (1955) as Kitty Tape
- The Merry Wives of Windsor – TV film (1955) as Anne Page
- ITV Play of the Week – TV series, 2 episodes (1957) as Petra/Doris
- Good Wives – TV series, 5 episodes (1958) as Amy
- Our Mutual Friend – TV series, 5 episodes (1958–1959) as Miss Lavinia Wilfer
- Sunday Night Theatre – TV series, 2 episodes (1960) as Diddo Geiss/Bunty Mainwaring
- An Age of Kings – TV series, 2 episodes (1960) as Queen Anne/Lady Anne
- Persuasion – TV series, 3 episodes (1960–1) as Louisa Musgrove
- The Amazing Dr. Clitterhouse – TV film (1962) as Nurse Ann
- Thirty-Minute Theatre – TV series, 1 episode (1962)
- The Spread of the Eagle – TV mini series, 1 episode (1963) as Charmian
- Sergeant Cork – TV series, 1 episode (1964) as Emma Snedden
- The Man in Room 17 – TV series, 1 episode (1965) as Moira Leigh
- The Arthur Haynes Show – TV series, 1 episode (1965)
- Theatre 625 – TV series, 1 episode (1965) as Emily Jackson
- Love Story – TV series, 1 episode (1967) as Myra
- My Man Joe – TV series, 1 episode (1967)
- Armchair Theatre – TV series, 1 episode (1968) as Audrey Nash
- Sanctuary – TV series, 1 episode (1967) as Hilary
- Best of Enemies – TV series, 1 episode (1969) as Rowena Gordon
- Parkin's Patch – TV series, 1 episode (1970) as Mrs. Jackson
- Hadleigh – TV series, 1 episode (1971) as Nicola Penn
- Paul Temple – TV series, 1 episode (1971) as Liz
- The Capone Investment – TV series, 4 episodes (1974) as Abigail
- Softly, Softly: Task Force – TV series, 1 episode (1976) as Doris
- East Lynne – TV film (1976) as Barbara Hare
- Jubilee – TV series, 1 episode (1977) as Anne Tallwatch
- Crown Court – TV series, 1 episode (1977) as Tanith Grant
- Grange Hill – TV series, 5 episodes (1978–9) as Miss Clarke
- The Professionals – TV series, 1 episode (1980) as Amanda's Mother
- Ladykillers – TV series, 1 episode (1981) as Edith Mabel Pegler
