= The Fly (1958 film) =

1958 film by Kurt Neumann

- Theatrical release poster
- Directed by: Kurt Neumann
- Screenplay by: James Clavell
- Based on: "The Fly" (1957 short story) by George Langelaan
- Produced by: Kurt Neumann
- Starring: David Hedison; Patricia Owens; Vincent Price; Herbert Marshall
- Cinematography: Karl Struss
- Edited by: Merrill G. White
- Music by: Paul Sawtell
- Production company: 20th Century-Fox
- Distributed by: 20th Century-Fox
- Release date: July 16, 1958 (US)
- Running time: 94 minutes
- Country: United States
- Language: English
- Budget: between $325,000 and $495,000
- Box office: $3 million or $1.7 million

The Fly is a 1958 American science fiction horror film directed and produced by Kurt Neumann and distributed by 20th Century-Fox. The screenplay by James Clavell is based on the 1957 short story of the same name by George Langelaan. The film stars David Hedison (in his first leading role), Patricia Owens, Vincent Price, and Herbert Marshall.

The film tells the story of a scientist who is transformed into a grotesque human–fly hybrid after a common house fly enters unseen into a molecular transporter with which he is experimenting, resulting in his atoms being combined with those of the insect. The film was released in CinemaScope by Fox, with color by Deluxe. It was released on July 16, 1958 as a double feature with Space Master X-7 (1958).

The first installment in The Fly film series, the film was followed by two sequels, Return of the Fly (1959) and Curse of the Fly (1965). A remake directed by David Cronenberg was released in 1986, itself followed by a 1989 sequel The Fly II.

== Plot ==
In Montreal, scientist André Delambre is found dead with his head and arm crushed in a hydraulic press. His wife Hélène confesses to the crime but refuses to provide a motive, and begins acting strangely. In particular, she is obsessed with flies, including a supposedly white-headed fly. André's brother, François, lies and says he caught the white-headed fly. Thinking he knows the truth, Hélène asks François to bring the police inspector in charge of the case, Charas, so that she can explain the circumstances of André's death to them both.

In flashback, André, Hélène, and their son Philippe are a happy family. André has been working on a matter-transporter device called the disintegrator-integrator. He initially tests it only on small, inanimate objects, such as a newspaper, before proceeding to living creatures, including the family's pet cat, Dandelo, (which fails to reintegrate, but can be heard meowing somewhere) and a guinea pig. After he is satisfied that these tests are succeeding, he builds a human-sized pair of chambers.

One day, Hélène, worried because André has not come up from the basement lab for a couple of days, goes down to find André with a black cloth draped over his head and a strange deformity on his left hand. Communicating only with typed notes and knocking (once for "Yes", twice for "No"), André tells Hélène that he tried to transport himself, but that a fly was caught in the chamber with him, which resulted in the mixing of their atoms. Now, he has the head and left arm of a fly, though he retains his human mind. Conversely, the fly has a miniature version of his head and left arm.

André needs Hélène to capture the fly so that he can reverse the process. After she, her son, and their housemaid exhaustively search for it, she finds it, but it slips out of a crack in the window. André's will begins to fade as the fly's instincts take over his brain. Time is running out, and while André can still think like a human, he smashes the equipment, burns his notes, and leads Hélène to the factory. When they arrive, he sets the hydraulic press, puts his head and arm under, and motions for Hélène to push the button. André's arm falls free as the press descends, and trying not to look, she raises the press, replaces the arm, and activates the machine a second time.

Upon hearing this confession, Inspector Charas deems Hélène insane and guilty of murder. As they are about to haul her away, Philippe tells François he has seen the fly trapped in a web in the back garden. François convinces the inspector to come and see for himself. The two men see the fly, with both André's head and arm, trapped on the web as Philippe told them. It screams, "Help me! Help me!" as a large spider advances on it. Just as the spider is about to devour the creature, Charas crushes them both with a rock. Knowing that nobody would believe the truth, François and Charas decide to declare André's death a suicide so that Hélène is not convicted of murder.

In the end, Hélène, François, and Philippe resume their daily lives. Sometime later, Philippe and Hélène are playing croquet in the yard. François arrives to take his nephew to the zoo. In reply to his nephew's query about his father's death, François tells Philippe, "He was searching for the truth. He almost found a great truth, but for one instant, he was careless. The search for the truth is the most important work in the whole world and the most dangerous." The film closes with Hélène escorting her son and François out of the yard.

== Cast ==
- David Hedison (Note: Credited as "Al Hedison".) as André Delambre
- Patricia Owens as Hélène Delambre
- Vincent Price as François Delambre
- Herbert Marshall as Inspector Charas
- Kathleen Freeman as Emma
- Betty Lou Gerson as Nurse Anderson
- Charles Herbert as Philippe Delambre

Uncredited

- Torben Meyer as Gaston
- Eugene Borden as Dr. Éjoute

== Production ==
=== Development ===
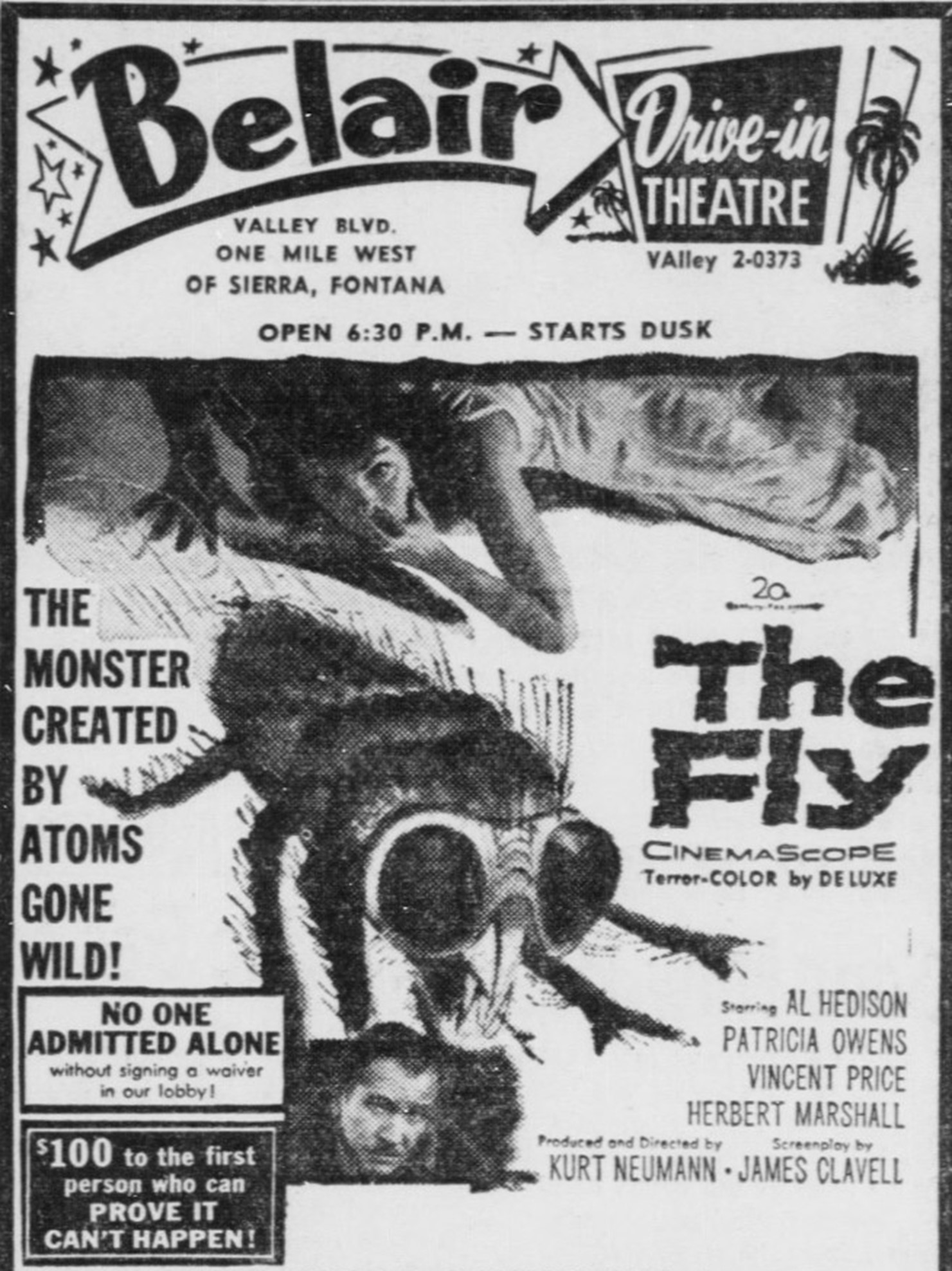
Drive-in advertisement from 1958

Producer-director Kurt Neumann discovered the short story by George Langelaan in Playboy magazine. He showed it to Robert L. Lippert, head of 20th Century Fox's subsidiary B-movie studio, Regal Films. The film was to be made by Lippert's outfit, but was released as an "official" Fox film, not under the less-prestigious Regal banner.

Lippert hired James Clavell to adapt Langelaan's story on the strength of a previous sci-fi spec script at RKO, which had never been produced. It became Clavell's first filmed screenplay. As Harry Spalding recalled, the script was "the best first draft I ever saw, it needed very little work".

The adaptation remained largely faithful to Langelaan's short story, apart from moving its setting from France to Canada, and crafting a happier ending by eliminating a suicide.

=== Casting ===
Lippert tried to cast Michael Rennie and Rick Jason in the role of André Delambre, before settling on then mostly-unknown David Hedison (billed as "Al Hedison"). The Fly was Hedison's second-ever film role, following a supporting part in The Enemy Below (1957), also for Fox. His "Fly" costume featured a 20-pound (9.1 kg) fly's head, about which he said: "Trying to act in it was like trying to play the piano with boxing gloves on". Hedison was never happy with the makeup, but makeup artist Ben Nye remained very positive about his work, writing years later that despite doing many subsequent science-fiction films, "I never did anything as sophisticated or original as The Fly".

Years later, Vincent Price recalled the cast finding some levity during the filming: "We were playing this kind of philosophical scene, and every time that little voice [of the fly] would say 'Help me! Help me!' we would just scream with laughter. It was terrible. It took us about 20 takes to finally get it".

=== Filming ===
Sources vary as to the film's budget, with one giving it as $325,000, another as $350,000, and others as high as $495,000; Lippert said the budget was $480,000. The shoot lasted 18 days in total. The film was photographed in 20th Century Fox's trademarked CinemaScope, with color by Deluxe. A $28,000 laboratory set was constructed from army surplus equipment. Photographic effects were handled by L. B. Abbott, with makeup by Ben Nye.

Despite having led the film through pre-production, Robert Lippert was not credited as a producer on the final film, with Kurt Neumann credited as sole producer. The AFI Catalog of Feature Films suggested that Lippert was replaced due to a dispute with the Screen Actors Guild, over alleged failure to pay royalties.

== Release ==
=== Theatrical ===
The Fly was released in July 1958 by 20th Century Fox. Producer-director Kurt Neumann died only a few weeks after its premiere, never realizing he had made the biggest hit of his career. It was shown on a double bill with Space Master X-7 (1958).

== Reception ==
=== Box office ===
The film was a commercial success, grossing $3 million at the domestic box office against a budget of less than $500,000 (Lippert claimed it earned $4 million), and becoming one of the biggest hits of the year for Fox studios. It earned $1.7 million in theatrical rentals.

The financial success of the film had the side effect of boosting co-star Vincent Price (whose previous filmography featured only scattered forays into genre film) into a major horror star. Price himself was positive about the film, saying, decades later, "I thought THE FLY was a wonderful film – entertaining and great fun".

=== Critical response ===
Cinematographer Karl Struss wrtote:

"The Fly, which I did back in Hollywood, was just plain ridiculous. There was one scene, which I told the director Kurt Neumann, was crazy. They had the figure of a man reduced to the size of a fly, and the fly talked. And they made the man say, 'Help me, help me!' in a tiny voice. Oh, gee!"

Upon its initial release, The Fly received mixed reviews. Critic Ivan Butler called it "the most ludicrous, and certainly one of the most revolting science-horror films ever perpetrated", and Carlos Clarens offered some praise for the effects, but concluded that the film "collapses under the weight of many... questions". A mixed review in The Monthly Film Bulletin read, in part: "The early sequences of this film have great mystery and tension, and the situation is ingeniously built up. But the film soon becomes as nauseating as its bare outline suggests; even the moments which in healthier pictures might provoke a laugh through sheer absurdity offer little relief".

The New York Times critic Howard Thompson was more positive, writing: "It does indeed contain, briefly, two of the most sickening sights one casual swatter-wielder ever beheld on the screen... Otherwise, believe it or not, The Fly happens to be one of the better, more restrained entries of the 'shock' school... Even with the laboratory absurdities, it holds an interesting philosophy about man's tampering with the unknown". Variety was also fairly positive, stating: "One strong factor of the picture is its unusual believability. It is told, by Clavell and Neumann, as a mystery suspense story, so that it has a compelling interest aside from its macabre effects". Harrison's Reports declared it "A first rate science-fiction-horror melodrama", adding: "the action grips one's attention from the opening to the closing scenes, and is filled with suspenseful, spine-chilling situations that will keep movie-goers on the edge of their seats". Philip K. Scheuer of the Los Angeles Times called the film "frightening, which is naturally its primary purpose. It is also more skillful in concept and execution than the average science-fiction effort".

Modern reviews have been more uniformly positive. On the review aggregator website Rotten Tomatoes, 95% of 43 critics' reviews of the film are positive; the site's "critics consensus" reads: "Deliciously funny to some and eerily prescient to others, The Fly walks a fine line between schlocky fun and unnerving nature parable". Cinefantastique's Steve Biodrowski declared that "the film, though hardly a masterpiece, stands in many ways above the level of B-movie science fiction common in the 1950s". Critic Steven H. Scheuer praised it as a "superior science-fiction thriller with a literate script for a change, plus good production effects and capable performances".

The Fly was nominated for the 1959 Hugo Award for Best SF or Fantasy Movie at the 17th World Science Fiction Convention.

=== Year-end lists ===
American Film Institute Lists

- AFI's 100 Years...100 Thrills – nominated
- AFI's 100 Years...100 Movie Quotes: "Help me! Help me!" – nominated

== Legacy ==
The success of the film encouraged Lippert to hire Clavell to make his directorial debut with Five Gates to Hell (1959).

== Franchise ==
=== Sequels ===
The film spawned two sequels, Return of the Fly (1959) and Curse of the Fly (1965).

=== Remake series ===
In 1986, a remake, also titled The Fly, was directed by David Cronenberg. A sequel to the remake, The Fly II, was released in 1989 without Cronenberg's involvement.

== See also ==
- The Wasp Woman, 1959 film
- The Metamorphosis by Franz Kafka
