= Joyce Webster =

Joyce Webster may refer to:

- Joyce Webster, character in The Alligator People
- Joyce Webster, character in Band of Gold (TV series)
