= Space Master X-7 =

1958 film by Edward Bernds

- Theatrical release poster
- Directed by: Edward Bernds
- Written by: George Worthing Yates; Daniel Mainwaring
- Produced by: Bernard Glasser
- Starring: Bill Williams; Lyn Thomas; Robert Ellis
- Cinematography: Brydon Baker
- Edited by: John F. Link Sr.
- Color process: Black and white
- Production company: Regal Films
- Distributed by: 20th Century-Fox
- Release date: July 11, 1958
- Running time: 71 minutes
- Country: United States
- Language: English
- Budget: $90,000

Space Master X-7 is a 1958 American horror science fiction film in Black and White Regalscope from Regal Films, produced by Bernard Glasser, directed by Edward Bernds, that stars Bill Williams, Lyn Thomas, and Robert Ellis. Paul Frees, Judd Holdren, and Moe Howard have supporting roles. The screenplay was written by George Worthing Yates and Daniel Mainwaring. The film was released on July 11, 1958 by 20th Century-Fox as a double feature with The Fly.

== Plot ==
A space probe returns to Earth, and samples from it are taken away to be investigated by scientist Dr Charles Pommer, working from his home laboratory. He quickly discovers that the mysterious microbes brought back from space, once dormant, grow quickly when fed protein, and he theorizes that Mars was possibly turned into a wasteland by this aggressive fungus. Spores from the fungus, which he christens 'Blood Rust', could easily be carried and transferred from person to person and the Earth itself could be threatened. Shortly afterwards the Blood Rust claims Pommer as its first victim but not before he manages to telephone agent John Hand to warn him of the danger. Hand and his sidekick Rattigan dash to the remote house in time to see the last of Pommer consumed, and they waste no time setting fire to the property to burn out the infection. Unfortunately, Pommer's former lover Laura Greeling had called that same evening to discuss the custody of their son, and was almost certainly contaminated. Hand and Rattigan begin a desperate hunt for a mysterious woman they have little information about while Greeling, thinking she's a suspect in a possible murder, tries everything not to be caught. Having reached Los Angeles, she buys new clothes and dyes her blonde hair brunette, then boards a flight home to Hawaii; but Rattigan manages to catch the flight too. As he interviews three suspect brunettes on board the airliner, the Blood Rust on her luggage grows, finally bursting out of the hold and terrifying the passengers. The plane, now crippled, manages a crash landing at Oxnard Air Force Base where Hand is waiting with a decontamination team.

== Cast ==
- Bill Williams as John Hand
- Lyn Thomas as Laura Greeling
- Robert Ellis as Pvt. Joe Rattigan
- Paul Frees as Dr. Charles T. Pommer
- Rhoda Williams as Stewardess Archer
- Joan Barry as Jean Meyers, a brunette
- Carol Varga as Elaine Frohman
- Thomas Browne Henry as Prof. West
- Thomas Wilde as Collins
- Fred Sherman as Mr. Morse, Hotel Manager
- Gregg Martell as Jim Dale, plane engineer
- Jess Kirkpatrick as Pilot Vaccarino
- Court Shepard as Battalion Fire Chief Hendry
- Moe Howard as Retlinger, the Cab Driver
- Al Baffert as Plane passenger

== Production ==
After making several Westerns for Regal Films, director Ed Bernds and producer Bernard Glasser thought they would make a science fiction picture.

Bernds says the script was written on "spec" by Daniel Mainwaring and George Worthing Yates. Bernard Glasser bought it and director Bernds rewrote the script without credit because the original was written for a feature film with a larger budget and a longer running time. Bernds said the film's total budget was $90,000.

Glasser, however, recalled that Space Master X-7 was budgeted at $125,000, with $25,000 going to the screenwriters.

The film was rushed into production to take advantage of the Explorer I satellite space launch. Regal's head of publicity, Marty Weiser, recommended they change the title from Missile into Space to the more exciting-sounding Space Master X-7.

Harry Spalding, who was Robert L. Lippert's story editor, recalls that the filmmakers went over budget but did a good job, so good that they were hired for Return of the Fly (1959).

Moe Howard, who made a cameo appearance in the film in a notable departure from his slapstick performances, had worked previously with Bernds on his Three Stooges shorts and asked if the production crew had a position for his son-in-law Norman Maurer. Maurer would work as the film's production assistant and received $1,000.00 for his efforts. In fact, Glasser was so impressed with Maurer's work that he recommended him to producer Sidney Pink for Pink's upcoming science fiction film, The Angry Red Planet (1959).

== Legacy ==
A Space Master X-7 video game was announced in 1983 for the Atari 2600 by Fox's video game publishing arm. It was not based on the film; programmer David Lubar had not heard of the 1958 film before Fox decided to attach its title to an original game he had developed. The port to Atari 8-bit computers, published by Sirius Software that same year, was released as Alpha Shield, dropping the film connection entirely.
