= Troubled Waters (1964 film) =

1964 British crime film

- Directed by: Stanley Goulder
- Written by: Al Rosen; Tudor Gates
- Based on: story by Al Rosen
- Produced by: Jack Parsons; Robert L. Lippert
- Starring: Tab Hunter
- Production company: Parroch-McCallum
- Distributed by: British Lion Films
- Release date: December 1964
- Running time: 74 minutes
- Country: United Kingdom
- Language: English

Troubled Waters (also known as The Man with Two Lives; U.S. title: Man with Two Faces ) is a 1964 British crime film directed by Stanley Goulder and starring Tab Hunter, Zena Walker and Andy Myers. It was written by Al Rosen and Tudor Gates.

== Premise ==
A violent criminal is released from prison and returns home to his wife and the young son he barely knows.

== Cast ==
- Tab Hunter as Alex Carswell
- Zena Walker as Janet Carswell
- Andy Myers as Ronnie Carswell
- Michael Goodliffe as Jeff Driscoll
- Yvette Rees as Sally Driscoll
- Stanley Morgan as Reverend Wilcox
- Arnold Bell as attendant
- Marianne Stone as Miss Stone

== Production ==
It was the first film written by Tudor Gates, for a company called Sagittarius. According to Gates, he was offered the job by Al Rosen, an American agent who he met in a studio carpark. Rosen talked him into writing a film and Rosen sold it. Gates says his fee was around a thousand pounds.

Filming took place at Shepperton Studios. Tab Hunter later called the film "a low budget potboiler with a fine actress called Zena Walker", adding "I didn't do it for the art, let's face it. I did it to stay in England and enjoy a life I'd never have otherwise experienced." He said the film "has fallen through the cracks, both in public consciousness and my own memory."
