= Ben Nye Makeup Company =

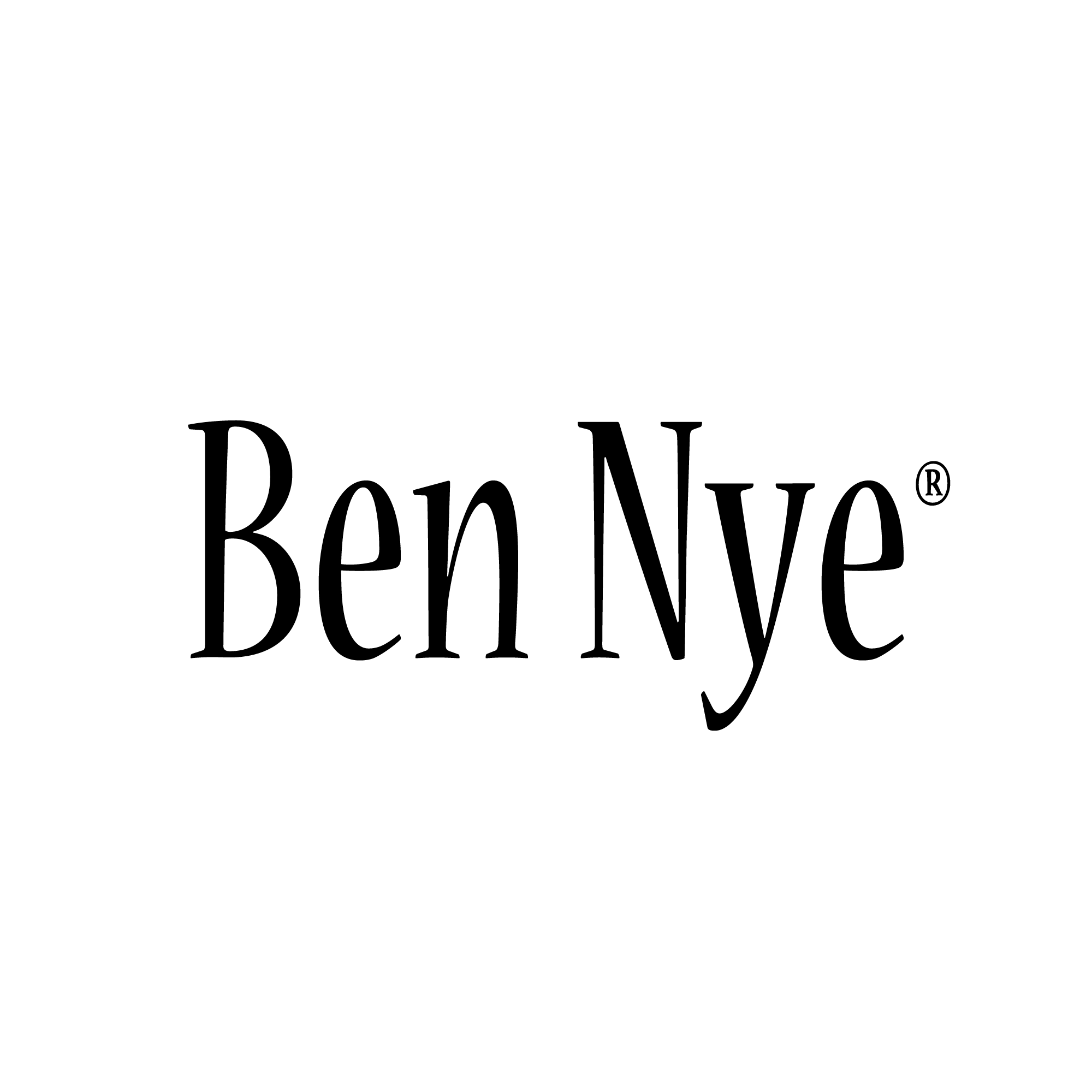
- Industry: Cosmetics
- Founded: 1967
- Founder: Ben Nye
- Headquarters: Los Angeles, California, United States
- Products: Theatrical makeup
- Website: www.bennye.com

Ben Nye Makeup Company is a cosmetics company founded in 1967 by film makeup artist Ben Nye. Most of the company's products are manufactured at its Los Angeles facility and sold through authorized retailers worldwide. The company produces theatrical, beauty and special-effects makeup for use in film, television and stage productions. It is led by Nye's son, Dana Nye. In 2017, the company celebrated its 50th anniversary. In 2024 the company filed for Chapter 11 bankruptcy amid litigation involving talc-based cosmetic products.

== History ==
Ben Nye founded the company in Los Angeles in 1967 after retiring as head of makeup at 20th Century Fox. During his career, he worked on more than 500 film and television productions, including Gone with the Wind, The Sound of Music and Planet of the Apes. Ben Nye products have also been used by performers at Walt Disney World.

His son, Dana, joined the company in 1970 as a marketing manager. In 2024, he took over running the company.

In 2016, Allure reported that Ben Nye's Banana Powder had sold out following publicity surrounding its use by makeup artist Mario Dedivanovic.
