= James Drury =

American actor (1934–2020)

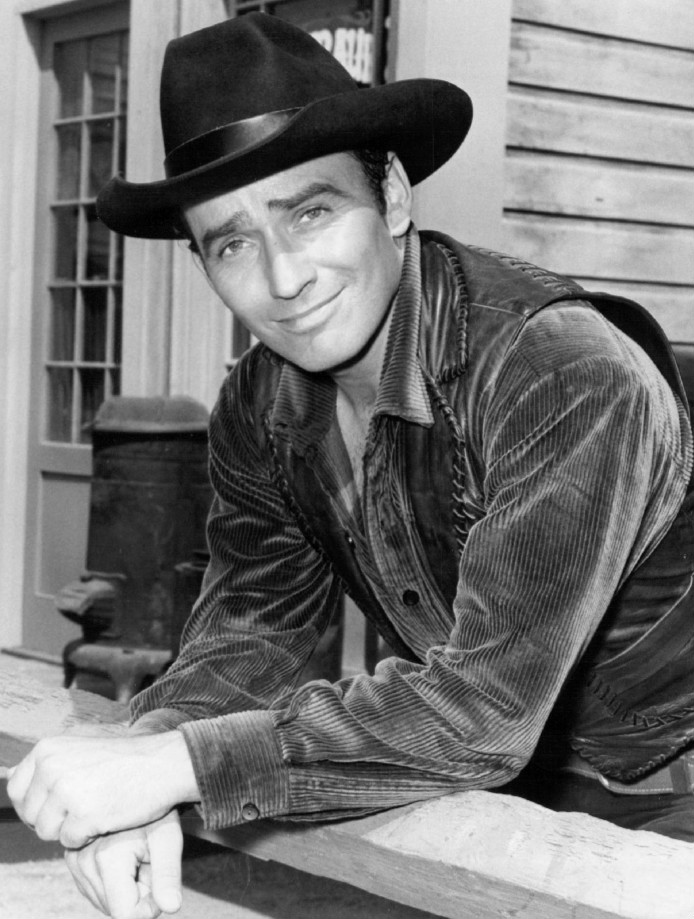
- James Drury in a publicity photo for The Virginian (1971)
- Born: James Child Drury Jr. April 18, 1934; New York City, U.S.
- Died: April 6, 2020 (aged 85); Houston, Texas, U.S.
- Education: New York University; UCLA
- Occupation: Actor
- Years active: 1955–2014
- Spouses: Cristall Orton (m. 1957; div. 1964); Phyllis Mitchell (m. 1968; div. 1979); Carl Ann Head (m. 1979; died 2019)
- Children: 2 sons (including Timothy Drury), a stepdaughter and 2 stepsons

James Child Drury Jr. (April 18, 1934 – April 6, 2020) was an American actor. He is best known for having played the title role in the 90-minute weekly Western television series The Virginian, which was broadcast on NBC from 1962 to 1971.

== Early years ==
Drury was born in New York City, the son of James Child Drury and Beatrice Crawford Drury. His father was a New York University professor of marketing. He grew up between New York City and Salem, Oregon, where his mother owned a farm. Drury contracted polio at the age of 10.

He studied drama at New York University and took additional classes at UCLA to complete his degree after he began acting in films at MGM.

== Career ==
Drury's professional acting career began when he was 12 years old, when he performed in a road company's production of Life with Father.

He signed a film contract with MGM in 1954 and appeared in bit parts in films. After he went to 20th Century Fox, he appeared in Love Me Tender (1956) and Bernardine (1957).

In 1959, Drury was cast as Harding, Jr., in the episode "Murder at the Mansion" on Richard Diamond, Private Detective. On May 9, 1959, early in his career, Drury appeared as Neal Adams in the episode "Client Neal Adams" of ABC's Western series Black Saddle.

On Christmas Eve 1959, Drury appeared in "Ten Feet of Nothing" on the syndicated anthology series, Death Valley Days, hosted by Stanley Andrews. Drury portrayed a young miner, Joe Plato.

In 1960, Drury appeared in different roles in two episodes, "Fair Game" and "Vindication", of another ABC Western series, The Rebel, starring Nick Adams as a Confederate adventurer roaming through the post-Civil War American West. HIs appearances led to a pilot for a half-hour TV series called The Yank, a spin-off of The Rebel. He played a physician traveling through the South after the American Civil War. Drury speculated that the series was not pick up because the "networks were going to one-hour shows and they were abandoning the half-hour Western format."

On November 16, 1960, Drury played young pioneer Justin Claiborne in the episode "The Bleymier Story" of NBC's Wagon Train. He was also cast in the 1960 Disney movie, Pollyanna as George Dodds, the love interest of Nancy Olson. That same year, Drury portrayed Joe Darle in the episode "Wall of Silence" of the ABC/Warner Bros. detective series, Bourbon Street Beat. He made a guest appearance on the CBS drama series Perry Mason in 1961 in the role of musician and defendant Eddy King in "The Case of the Missing Melody".

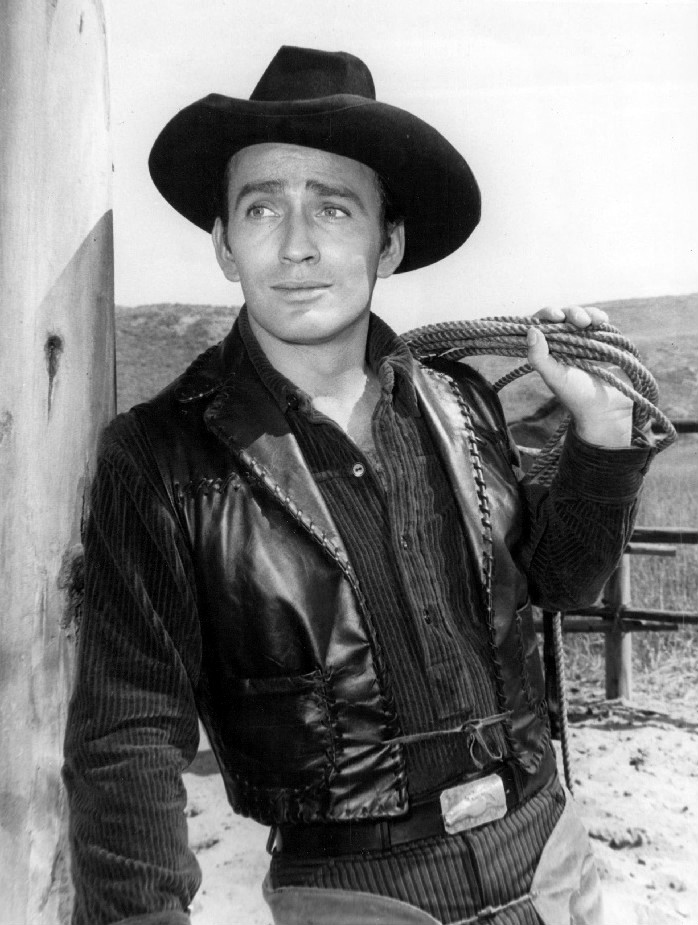
Drury as "The Virginian"

He appeared in secondary roles for Disney. In 1962, he was cast in a substantial role as a lascivious gold prospector in the early Sam Peckinpah Western Ride the High Country (1962) opposite Randolph Scott and Joel McCrea. On April 11, 1962, Drury played the title role in an episode of Wagon Train, "The Cole Crawford Story", (S5, E28).

Around the same time, Drury landed the top-billed leading role of the ranch foreman on The Virginian, a lavish series that ran for nine seasons until 1971. Drury was put under a 7-year contract with Universal in 1962, and was the front-runner for the role, but he still had to audition three separate times and was required to lose 30 pounds in 30 days to secure the part. Drury reported that he had based his performance of the Virginian on character elements of his maternal grandfather, with whom he had spent much of his childhood.

Drury and his Wilshire Boulevard Buffalo Hunters band performed 54 USO-sponsored shows for troops in Vietnam in three weeks in April 1966.

Drury continued his title role in The Virginian after it was reformatted as The Men from Shiloh on NBC (1970–1971). He had the lead role of Captain Spike Ryerson in the drama series Firehouse on ABC television in 1974.

In 1993, Drury had a guest-starring role as Captain Tom Price on the first three episodes of Walker, Texas Ranger, opposite Chuck Norris and Clarence Gilyard. Drury also had a cameo role in the 2000 TV movie of The Virginian starring Bill Pullman. The film followed Wister's novel more closely than had the television series. Drury appeared in a number of films and other television programs, including The Young Warriors and the TV cowboy reunion movie The Gambler Returns: The Luck of the Draw with Doug McClure who played the character Trampas on The Virginian, Clint Walker who played Cheyenne Bodie in Cheyenne and Hugh O'Brian who played Wyatt Earp in The Life and Legend of Wyatt Earp.

In 1991, Drury was inducted into the Hall of Great Western Performers at the National Cowboy & Western Heritage Museum in Oklahoma City. In 1997 and 2003, he was a guest at the Western Film Fair in Charlotte, North Carolina.

== Personal life and death ==
On February 7, 1957, Drury married Cristall Othones, and fathered two sons, Timothy and James Child III. The couple divorced on November 23, 1964, and on April 27, 1968, he married Phyllis Jacqueline Mitchell; the marriage ended in divorce on January 30, 1979. His third marriage was to Carl Ann Head on July 30, 1979; it lasted until her death on August 25, 2019. Drury had three stepchildren from his previous marriages, a stepdaughter, Rhonda Brown, and two stepsons, Frederick Drury and Gary Schero. His son, Timothy Drury, is a keyboardist, guitarist, and vocalist who has played with the rock groups Eagles and Whitesnake.

Drury supported Barry Goldwater in the 1964 United States presidential election.

Drury died from natural causes on April 6, 2020, 12 days short of his 86th birthday.

== Filmography ==
=== Film ===
Year	Title	Role	Notes
1955	Blackboard Jungle	Hospital Attendant	Uncredited
1955	Love Me or Leave Me	Assistant Director	Uncredited
1955	The Tender Trap	Eddie	
1956	Diane	Lieutenant	Uncredited
1956	Forbidden Planet	Crewman Strong	
1956	The Last Wagon	Lieutenant Kelly	
1956	Love Me Tender	Ray Reno	
1957	Bernardine	Lieutenant Langley Beaumont	
1959	Good Day for a Hanging	Paul Ridgely	
1960	Toby Tyler	Jim Weaver	
1960	Pollyanna	George Dodds	
1960	Ten Who Dared	Walter Powell	
1962	Ride the High Country	Billy Hammond	
1962	Third of a Man	Emmet	
1967	The Young Warriors aka Eagle Warriors	Sergeant Cooley	
1971	The Devil and Miss Sarah	Gil Turner	
1991	The Gambler Returns: The Luck of the Draw	Jim	
1994	Maverick	Riverboat Poker Player	Uncredited
2005	Hell to Pay	JT Coffee	
TBA	Billy and the Bandit	Grandpa	Posthumous release

=== Television ===
Year 1961	Title	Role	Notes
1961	Perry Mason	Guest Star	Season 5 Episode 3
1955–61	Gunsmoke	Tom / Johnny Red / Jerry Cass / Booth Rider	4 episodes
1958	Alfred Hitchcock Presents	Michael Grimes	Season 3 Episode 23: "The Right Kind of House"
1958	Playhouse 90	Jesse James	Episode: "Bitter Heritage"
1958	Decision	The Virginian	Episode: "The Virginian"
1958	The Texan	Johnny Kaler	Episode: "The Troubled Town"
1958–61	The Rifleman	Spicer / Lloyd Carpenter	2 episodes
1959	Have Gun - Will Travel	Tony	Season 2, Episode 21 "Hunt the Man Down"
1959	Rawhide	Kenley	S1:E3, "Incident with an Executioner"
1959	Lawman	Clay Troop	Episode "The Gang"
1959	Lawman	Stan Bates	Episode "The Outsider"
1959	Steve Canyon	Lieutenant Richard Muller	Season 1/Episode 27 - "The Muller Story" Season 1/Episode 33 - "Sabotage"
1959	Cheyenne	Bill Magruder	Episode: "The Impostor"
1959	Black Saddle	Neal Adams	Episode: "Client: Neal Adams"
1959-60	Men into Space	Major Nick Alborg	Episode: "Tankers in Space"
1959-60	Wagon Train	Cole Crawford / Justin Claiborne	2 episodes
1961	Rawhide	Johnny Adler	Season 3 Episode 20: "Incident of the Boomerang"
1961	Rawhide	Rance	Season 3 Episode 29: "Incident of the Night on the Town"
1962	The Detectives	Adrian	Episode: "Walk a Crooked Line"
1962–71	The Virginian	The Virginian	249 episodes
1969	Rowan & Martin's Laugh-In	Himself	2 episodes
1971–72	Alias Smith and Jones	Sheriff Tankersley / Sheriff Lom Trevors	2 episodes
1971	Ironside	Al	Episode: "The Professionals"
1974	Firehouse	Captain Spike Ryerson	13 episodes
1993	Walker, Texas Ranger	Captain Tom Price	3 episodes
1993–94	The Adventures of Brisco County, Jr.	Ethan Emerson	2 episodes
2012	Tales of the Cap Gun Kid	Ranger Captain	1 episode

== Narrator ==
- River Invaders: The Scourge of Zebra Mussels (1994) — PBS special — host/narrator
- Sturgeon: Ancient Survivors of the Deep (1995) — PBS special — host/narrator
- A Vanishing Melody: The Call of the Piping Plover (1997) — PBS special
