= Ten Who Dared =

- Directed by: William Beaudine
- Written by: Lawrence Edward Watkin
- Based on: journal by John Wesley Powell
- Produced by: Walt Disney; James Algar
- Starring: Brian Keith; John Beal; James Drury
- Cinematography: Gordon Avil
- Edited by: Norman Palmer; Cotton Warburton
- Music by: Oliver Wallace
- Color process: Technicolor
- Production company: Walt Disney Productions
- Distributed by: Buena Vista Distribution
- Release date: November 1, 1960
- Running time: 92 minutes
- Country: United States
- Language: English

Ten Who Dared is a 1960 American Western film directed by William Beaudine and starring Brian Keith, Ben Johnson, John Beal and James Drury. It was produced by Walt Disney Productions and released by Buena Vista Distribution. It tells the story of United States Army officer John Wesley Powell, who was the first to travel down the Colorado River, and the dangers that he and nine other men had to face while making a map of the region during their 1869 expedition. Hired by Walt Disney Studios in 1959 as a technical adviser, Otis R. Marston led a film crew through the Grand Canyon to film river running and background scenes for the film.

== Plot ==
The film is set in the United States, in 1869.

Thanks to the activity of explorers, soldiers and trappers, the American territory is now well known. On the cards, there are few places marked with an explicit Unexplored (unexplored). One of these places shrouded in mystery and avoided because they are believed to be full of danger is the Colorado River.

John Wesley Powell, a former Northern major of enormous scientific culture, but without an arm, lost at the Battle of Shiloh during the Civil War, gathers 9 men, including his brother Walter, marked by the sufferings of Southern captivity, and obtains 4 boats to set out to discover Colorado.

The journey is long and difficult. On the way, a boat is destroyed by the whiskey drunk occupants.

The meeting with Baker, trapper husband of an Indian and friend of Powell, who tells of terrible waterfalls, makes one of the men abandon the company. Three others mutiny, continuing the journey overland alone, but are killed by the Indians who pass them off as the killers of a squaw.

Powell eventually finds the point where the Colorado flows into Lake Mead, concluding the great feat with success.

== Cast ==
- Brian Keith as Bill Dunn
- John Beal as Major John Wesley Powell
- James Drury as Walter Powell
- R. G. Armstrong as Oramel Howland
- Ben Johnson as George Bradley
- L. Q. Jones as Billy "Missouri" Hawkins
- Dan Sheridan as Jack Sumner
- David Stollery as Andrew "Andy" Hall
- Stan Jones as Seneca Howland
- David Frankham as Frank Goodman
- Roy Barcroft as Jim Baker
- Pat Hogan as Indian Chief
- Ray Walker as McSpadden
- Jack Bighead as Ashtishkel
- Dawn Little Sky as Indian Woman
- Chickie The Dog as Jarvie The Dog

== Production ==
Besides the Grand Canyon, other parts of the film were shot at the Big Bend of the Colorado River, Professor Valley, Arches, Dead Horse Point, Dewey, Castle Valley, and Westwater Canyon in Utah.

The Grand Canyon production crew included producer James Algar, assistant director of script Herb Hirst, assistant director and production manager Russ Haverick, assistant producer Alessandro "Vee" Bodrero, head cameraman Gordon Avil, operative cameraman Richard Kelley, medical control Forrest "Doc" Reed, special effects Ray Bolton, makeup and wardrobe Frank LaRue, radioman Lester Gear, mechanic Don "Doc" Hill and rim control Matthew Bruttig.

One of the replica boats used on the film, the Emma Dean, was recovered by local raconteur, Stan A. Jones, in 1969 from the Golden Oak Ranch, a Disney movie lot in Placerita Canyon, Newhall, Santa Clarita, California. The boat is on display at the Powell Museum in Page, Arizona.

== Reception ==
According to Allmovie, critics consistently rate this as one of the worst films made by Disney. Halliwell's Film Guide calls it "tedious and unconvincing". Leonard Maltin's annual publication "TV Movies" gives the film a BOMB rating, describing it as "rock-bottom Disney".

== Comic book adaptation ==
- Dell Four Color #1178 (December 1960)
