= Dorothy Arnold (actress) =

American actress (1917–1984)

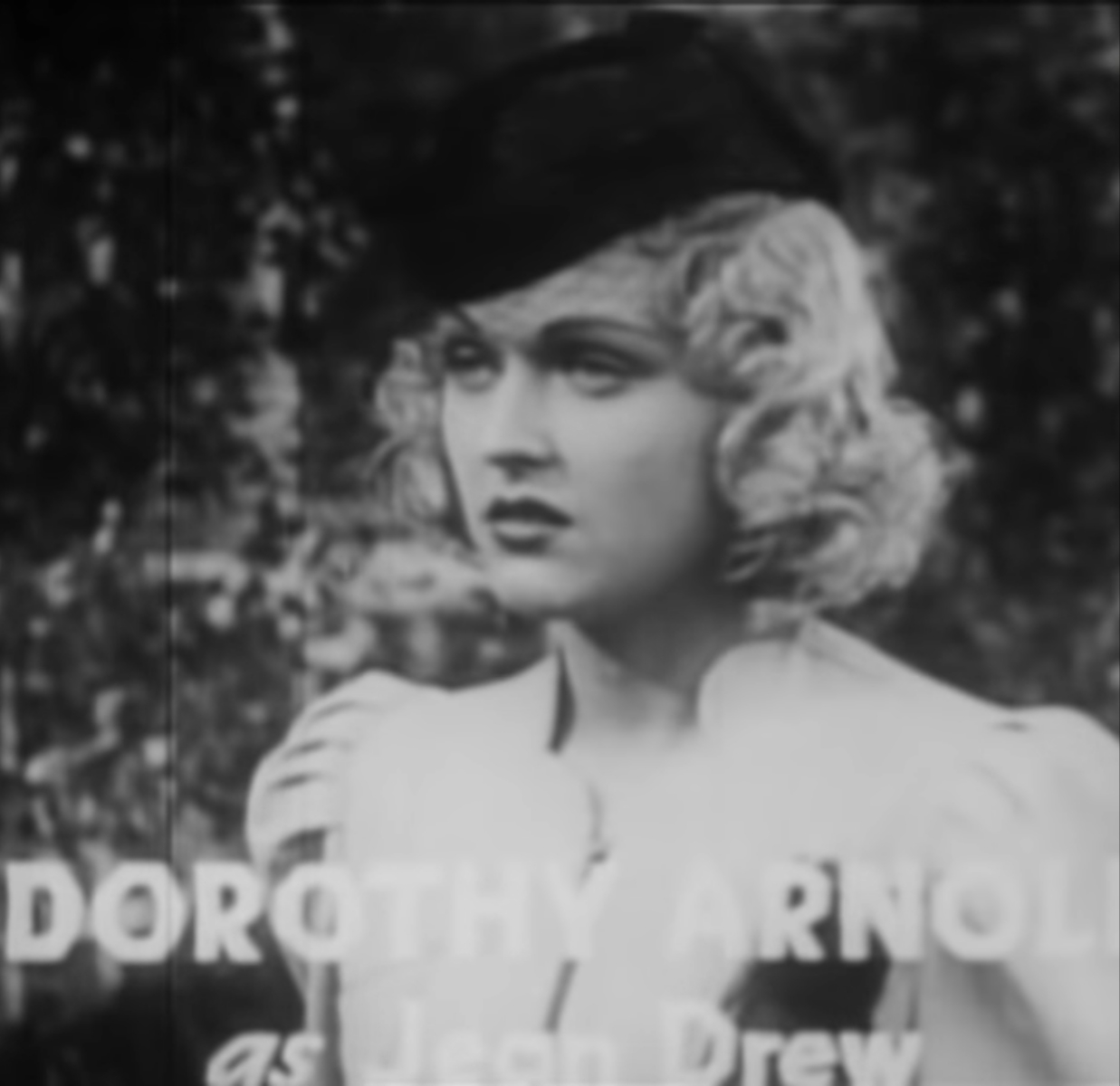
- Arnold in The Phantom Creeps (1939)
- Born: Dorothy Arnoldine Olson; November 21, 1917; Duluth, Minnesota, U.S.
- Died: November 13, 1984 (aged 66); Ensenada, Mexico
- Resting place: Desert Memorial Park, Cathedral City, California
- Occupation: Actress
- Years active: 1937–1958
- Spouses: Joe DiMaggio (m. 1939; div. 1944) George Schubert (m. 1946; div. 1950) Ralph Peck (Peckovich) (m. 1970)
- Children: Joseph Paul DiMaggio Jr.

Dorothy Arnold (born Dorothy Arnoldine Olson; November 21, 1917 – November 13, 1984) was an American film actress. She was the first wife of baseball star Joe DiMaggio.

== Early life ==
Dorothy Arnoldine Olson was born on 21 November 1917 in Duluth, Minnesota. Her father worked for Northern Pacific Railway.

== Career ==
Arnold appeared in 15 films between 1937 and 1939. She portrayed Jean Drew in The Phantom Creeps, and Gloria DeVere in The House of Fear. She won praise for her performance in 1957's Lizzie as the wanton, immoral mother of the title character. She also guest starred on TV's The Adventures of Jim Bowie, and Dragnet.

== Personal life ==
Arnold met DiMaggio in 1937 on the set of the film Manhattan Merry-Go-Round. He had a minor speaking role; she had no lines. She was 19; he was 23. They married three days before her 22nd birthday on November 18, 1939, at Sts. Peter and Paul Church in San Francisco. Their son, Joseph Paul DiMaggio III, was born at Doctors Hospital. In 1944, Arnold and DiMaggio divorced.

Her next marriage was to stockbroker George Schubert in 1946. They divorced in 1950. She married Ralph Peck (Peckovich) on August 27, 1970, with whom she remained until her death.

Arnold made headlines in 1952 when she sued DiMaggio for sole custody of their son and increased support payments, citing Joe's new girlfriend Marilyn Monroe as a threat to the boy's morals.

== Later years and death ==
Arnold lived with Peck in Cathedral City. They owned and operated a supper club called "Charcoal Charley's", where she regularly performed for the club's patrons.

The Desert Sun stated that she died from pancreatic cancer eight days before her 67th birthday at La Gloria Clinic in Ensenada, Mexico. She is interred at Desert Memorial Park.

== Filmography ==
=== Film ===
Year	Title	Role	Notes
1937	Freshies	Singer	Short
1937	Manhattan Merry-Go-Round	Dancer	Uncredited; Alternative title: Manhattan Music Box
1938	The Storm	Nora, Bar Girl	
1938	Exposed	Hatcheck Girl	Uncredited
1938	Secrets of a Nurse	Secretary	
1938	Gambling Ship	Hostess	Uncredited
1939	The Phantom Creeps	Jean Drew	Serial, Alternative title: The Shadow Creeps
1939	Pirates of the Skies	Waitress	Uncredited
1939	You Can't Cheat an Honest Man	First Debutante	Uncredited
1939	Risky Business	Helen	Uncredited
1939	The Family Next Door	Cashier	
1939	Code of the Streets	Mildred	
1939	Unexpected Father	Sally	Alternative title: Sandy Takes a Bow
1939	The House of Fear	Gloria DeVere	
1939	Hero for a Day	Dorothy	
1957	Lizzie	Elizabeth's Mother	
1958	Fräulein	Woman with Hugo	Uncredited (final film role)

=== Television ===
Year	TV series	Role	Notes
1952	The Files of Jeffrey Jones		Episode "Squeeze Play"
1954	The Lone Wolf	Nancy St. Clair	Episode "The Robbery Store"
1957	The Adventures of Jim Bowie	Cherry Blondell	Episode "Jackson's Assassination"
1957	Dragnet		Episode "The Big Help"
