= Curse of the Fly =

1966 British film by Don Sharp

- Theatrical release poster
- Directed by: Don Sharp
- Written by: Harry Spalding
- Based on: "The Fly"; 1957 story in Playboy by George Langelaan
- Produced by: Robert L. Lippert; Jack Parsons
- Starring: Brian Donlevy; Carole Gray; George Baker
- Cinematography: Basil Emmott
- Edited by: Robert Winter
- Music by: Bert Shefter
- Production company: Lippert Films
- Distributed by: 20th Century Fox
- Release dates: May 7, 1965 (UK); January 31, 1966 (U.S.)
- Running time: 86 minutes
- Country: United Kingdom
- Language: English
- Budget: $90,000

Curse of the Fly is a 1965 British horror film directed by Don Sharp and starring Brian Donlevy, Carole Gray and George Baker. It was written by Harry Spalding and was the sequel to Return of the Fly (1959), as the third installment in The Fly film series. Unlike the other films in the series it was produced in the United Kingdom.

Curse of the Fly was rarely seen for many years, as it was the only entry in the Fly film trilogy that did not receive a videotape, laserdisc or online release. Outside of an abridged Super 8mm version released to the home movie market in the mid-1970s, it did not receive its home video premiere until 2007, when it was released in a boxed set with the original series of films.

== Plot ==
Martin Delambre is driving to Montreal one night when he sees a young woman by the name of Patricia Stanley running in her underwear. They fall in love and are soon married. However, they both hold secrets: she has recently escaped from a mental asylum; he and his father Henri are engaged in radical experiments in teleportation, which have already had horrific consequences. Martin also suffers recessive fly genes which cause him to age rapidly and he needs a serum to keep him young.

In a rambling mansion in rural Quebec, Martin and Henri have successfully teleported people between there and London, but the previous failures resulted in horribly disfigured and insane victims who are locked up in the stables. Martin's first wife Judith is one of them, as well as Samuels and Dill, two men who had worked as the Delambres' assistants. Martin's brother Albert mans the London receiving station but wishes to terminate the teleportation project and escape the obsession that has driven his grandfather, his father and his brother. Wan and Tai, a Chinese couple who work for the Delambres in the house as well as in the lab, complete the household.

The police and the headmistress of the asylum trace Patricia to the Delambre estate, where they learn that she has married Martin, but it is soon discovered that he had a previous wife whom he did not divorce. Inspector Charas, who had investigated Andre Delambre and is now an old man in the hospital, tells Inspector Ronet about the Delambre family and their experiments.

As the police begin to close in, a mixture of callousness and madness afflicts the Delambres, and they decide to abandon their work and eliminate the evidence of their failures. They subdue and plan to teleport Samuels and Dill to the London lab, but Samuels awakens and attacks Martin. With the help of Henri who appears to aid his son, they stop Samuels. Failing to reach Albert, they teleport one of the assistants anyway. When they're able to reach Albert before sending the other, they realize the assistants will reintegrate merged into a single writhing mass. Albert is horrified at the sight and kills the thing with an axe.

Wan, angry at what they have done to Judith, sometimes releases her, ensuring that Pat sees her, but her husband and father-in-law insist she has had a nightmare. However, Martin finally admits the truth when Pat fears she really is insane. Wan releases Judith again, telling her Pat is in her, Judith's, bedroom, but Judith locks her in the cell and goes after Pat. Pat runs to the lab where Tai is working, and as Pat escapes, Tai tries to stop Judith. She attacks him and he kills her in self-defense. Tai releases Wan and tells her what has happened, and they rid themselves of a possible murder charge by teleporting Judith's body. But now, Tai and Wan have had enough and leave the Quebec estate.

On their return from another interview with the police, Henri convinces Martin that they must send the unconscious Patricia to London and then follow in order to escape from the police. Martin resists, afraid that she might be harmed, so Henri volunteers to go first. Martin sends Henri to London, unaware that Albert has destroyed the reintegration equipment and that Judith was sent without his knowledge beforehand (which could have resulted in another cell merge as with Samuels and Dill had Albert not destroyed the machine). Henri does not rematerialize and is lost. Realizing what has happened, Albert leaves the lab, sobbing, and is not seen again.

Inspector Ronet arrives at the estate, passing Tai and Wan as they drive away. Patricia awakens in the teleportation chamber but escapes before the transmission sequence is complete. Martin pursues her but starts aging again. Without his serum he quickly dies, sprawled across the front seat of his car. Soon after, Ronet finds him reduced to a skeleton, and he escorts the badly shaken Patricia back into the house.

== Cast ==
- Brian Donlevy as Henri Delambre
- George Baker as Martin Delambre
- Carole Gray as Patricia Stanley
- Burt Kwouk as Tai
- Yvette Rees as Wan
- Michael Graham as Albert Delambre
- Mary Manson as Judith Delambre
- Charles Carson as Inspector Charas
- Jeremy Wilkins as Inspector Ronet
- Rachel Kempson as Madame Fournier

== Production ==
The film was one of a series of movies Robert L. Lippert was making in England, in order to take advantage of the Eady Levy. He used an English producer, Jack Parsons. Parsons had previously made Witchcraft (1964) with director Don Sharp for Lippert and used them again on Curse of the Fly.

Lippert wanted to make a third "Fly" movie. Harry Spalding says he was reluctant to do it but Lippert said "you handle it, kid".

Spalding later said: "It wasn't all that bad a script. As a matter of fact, Don Sharp said the opening ten pages, where the girl is coming out of the insane asylum, was the best opening he'd ever had on film".

Harry Spalding said he wrote the lead for "a Claude Rains kind of guy" and was unhappy to get Brian Donlevy. Spalding thought this affected Don Sharp's confidence in the film.

Don Sharp later said he felt the script "wasn't good enough" and that he only took the job because he had been working for a long time as a second unit director on Those Magnificent Men in Their Flying Machines and was desperate to direct again. Despite it, he said there were some strong sequences.

== Continuity Issues ==
Although a sequel to The Fly and Return of the Fly, the backstory used for Curse of the Fly does not match the continuity of the first two films, but it does build its narrative on elements and characters from those films:

- Curse of the Fly centers on Henri and Martin Delambre, identified as the son and grandson of the Andre Delambre character depicted in The Fly. Andre isn't mentioned by name however, but Inspector Charas handled his case and his invention of a teleportation device and subsequent accidental integration with a housefly remain within the backstory. However, his resultant assisted suicide is removed. Instead, his son, apparently a different character from the boy Philippe Delambre depicted in The Fly and Return of the Fly, was able to put both the altered man and the altered fly back into the teleportation chamber and successfully reverse the integration, as was done with an adult Philippe in Return.
- The dialogue within Curse of the Fly contains no mention of Philippe, although a photograph shown in the film, which is supposed to be of Andre in his altered form from The Fly, is actually a production still from Philippe's transformation in Return of the Fly. Henri seems to be the Phillippe character, though he is never referred to as Henri in the movie, only in the credits. This may be a mistake on the filmmakers' part as the name of Andre's son in the short story was Henri, changed to Phillippe in the original movie adaptation indicating Henri here is supposed to be a much older Phillippe.

== Reception ==
=== Box office ===
According to John Hamilton, writing in The British Independent Horror Film 1951-70, the film was a box office disappointment.

=== Critical response ===
The Monthly Film Bulletin wrote: "Beginning with a stylishly eerie pre-credit sequence of Patricia's flight from the asylum projected in slow motion, The Curse of the Fly looks very promising for a time: the first glimpses of the Delambre laboratory and experiments, the uneasy courtship of Martin and Patricia, and their return to the quietly sinister Delambre mansion. After that, though, the rather desperately inventive script takes over, and Don Sharp can do little but run with the tide. Not content with mad scientists, monsters, oriental servants, and a romance between a neurotic girl and a man liable to break out all over in decomposing pustules at the slightest provocation, the script tries to cap the lot by throwing in echoes of Gaslight and Rebecca, with a Chinese Mrs. Danvers driving the second wife mad while the first one plays mad music in the moonlight on the piano downstairs. Unfortunately the dialogue is so banal, and the acting (with the exception of Carole Gray) so stolid, that it isn't nearly as much fun as it might have been."

Kine Weekly wrote: "Below-average thriller fare. ...The pseudo-scientific mumbo-jumbo is effective, but repeated too often, and there are far too many loose ends. There are, however, some moments of suspense and excitement and the three stars ... do their best with their mediocre material."

In The Radio Times Guide to Films Alan Jones gave the film 2/5 stars, writing: "Brian Donlevy takes over from Vincent Price as the mad doctor experimenting with teleportation through the fourth dimension in this average second sequel to monster hit The Fly. Unfortunately, he still can't get the matter transmissions right, and the mutant results of his labours are locked in a closet. Journeyman director Don Sharp's talent for shock effects gets lost amid the stiff acting, slow pacing and cheap production values, but the odd moment of eerie atmosphere does surface." Vincent Price is not the mad doctor in either of the previous movies; rather, he is the voice of reason, with first his character's brother and then nephew being the actual scientist in each movie.
