= Exotic and Unusual Fishes of North America =

PBS documentaries

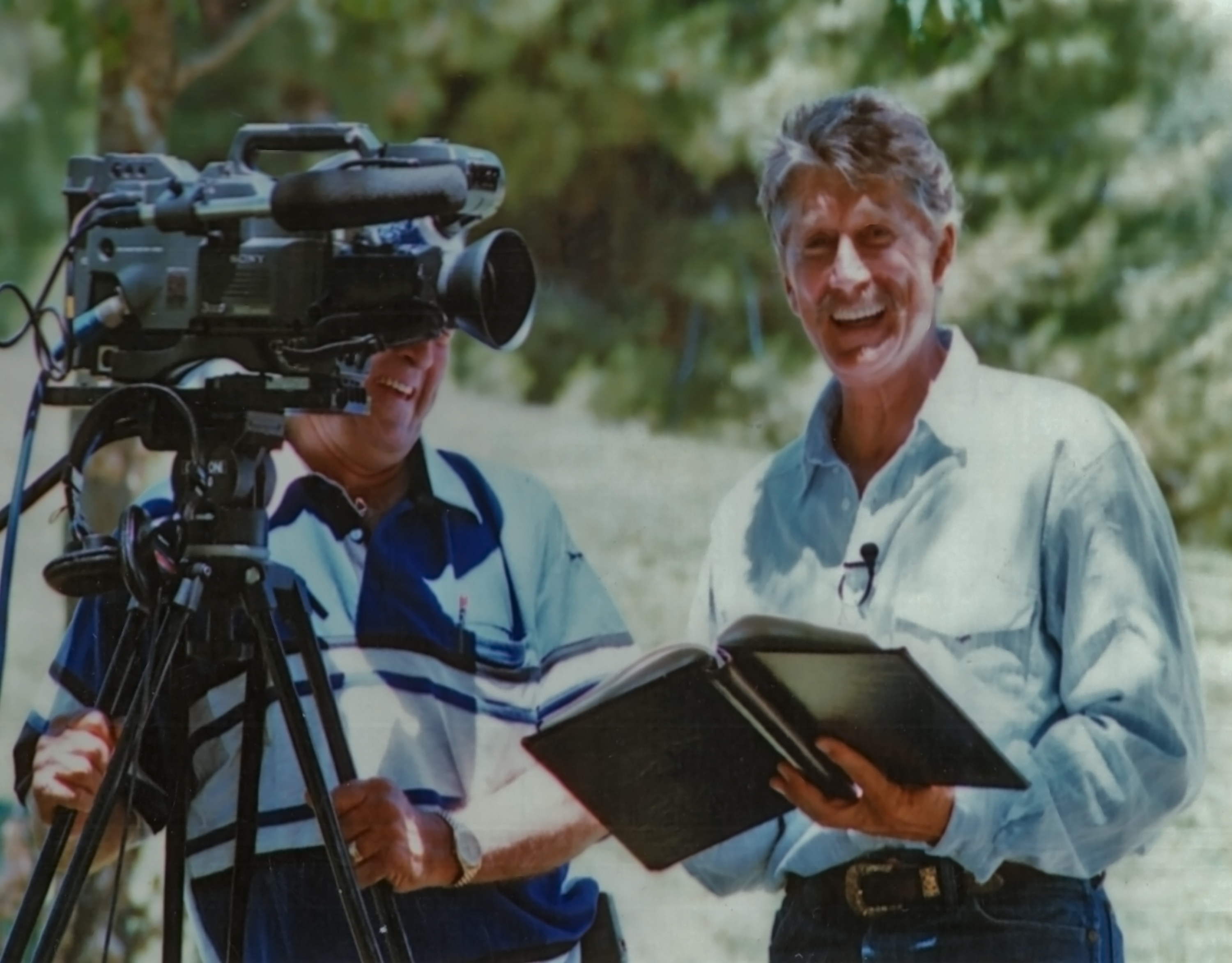
Alex Cord on location (1993) performing the voice-over and on-camera work for The Paddlefish: An American Treasure

Exotic and Unusual Fishes of North America is a series of PBS documentary television specials about three species of American fish: The Alligator Gar: Predator or Prey?, The Paddlefish: An American Treasure, and Sturgeon: Ancient Survivors of the Deep. They were presented by KUHT Houston television station, and aired in the United States from 1992 to 1995.

== The Alligator Gar: Predator or Prey? ==
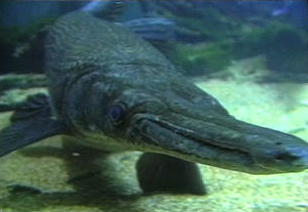
Alligator Gar from video

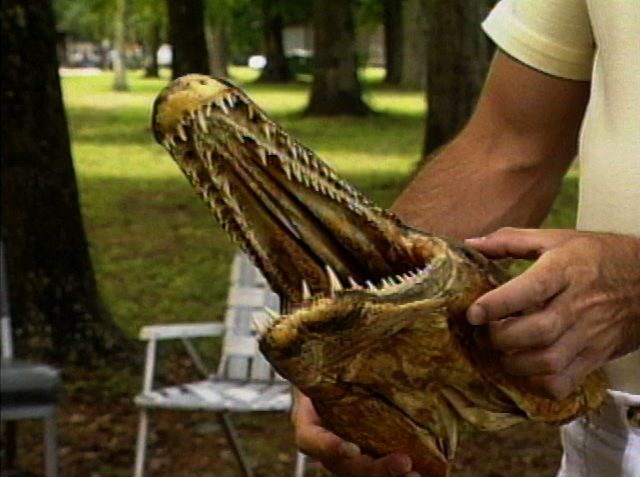
Alligator gar head, showing dual rows of teeth, from video

The Alligator Gar: Predator or Prey? was a 28 minute video that discussed the biology of this "living fossil", one of the few species that can breathe both air and water, as well as its commercial and sportfishing aspects. It was the highest rated program of the night on KUHT when it was aired in 1992, and again in 1995.

== The Paddlefish: An American Treasure ==
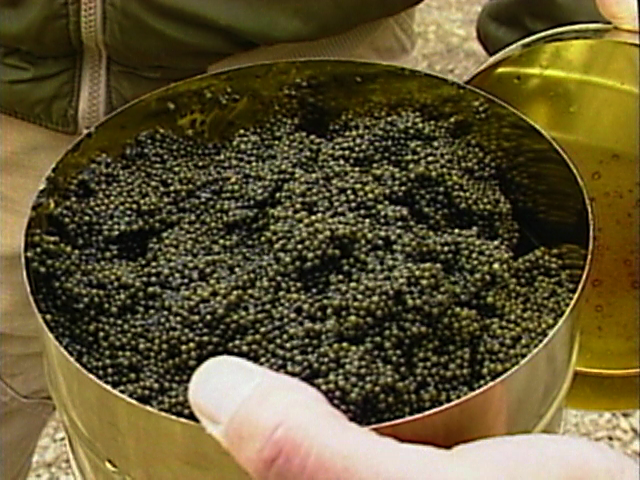
Paddlefish caviar from video

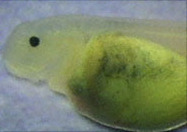
Larval paddlefish from video

The Paddlefish: An American Treasure was a one-hour special for PBS broadcast, filmed over 1992 and 1993 in the Dakotas, Montana, Missouri, Louisiana and Arkansas, and narrated by actor Alex Cord. It included most aspects of paddlefish, from spawning, microscopic embryonic development, to loss of habitat, particularly in the Missouri River, and even a poaching incident with an arrest, which resulted in federal charges and a jail sentence. It explained how paddlefish are poached for their eggs, a substitute for beluga caviar unavailable due to the Iranian Revolution in the late 1970s. The recorded radio conversations, late-night filming, and poaching arrest were compared to episodes of the COPS television program. It also discussed artificial propagation, fish stocking, and aquaculture, raising paddlefish for their flavorful meat. It won fourth place in the 1994 North American Film/Video Awards, Conservation/Natural History category, given by the Outdoor Writers Association of America.

== Sturgeon: Ancient Survivors of the Deep ==
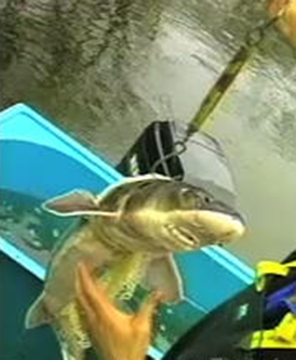
Shortnose sturgeon on hand scale, from video

Sturgeon: Ancient Survivors of the Deep was an hour special televised on PBS in 1995, and narrated by actor James Drury. Its video release was criticized for focusing on the sturgeon as a game fish. A frame from the video was used to create the 39-cent white sturgeon single US postage stamp, commemorating it as the largest freshwater fish in America, as part of the 2006 Commemorative Edition stamps, "Wonders of America – Land Of Superlatives".
