= Return of the Fly =

1958 film directed by Edward Bernds

- Theatrical release poster
- Directed by: Edward Bernds
- Written by: Edward Bernds
- Based on: "The Fly"; 1957 story in Playboy by George Langelaan
- Produced by: Bernard Glasser
- Starring: Vincent Price; Brett Halsey
- Cinematography: Brydon Baker
- Edited by: Richard Meyer
- Music by: Paul Sawtell; Bert Shefter
- Production company: Associated Producers Inc
- Distributed by: 20th Century Fox
- Release date: July 22, 1959
- Running time: 80 minutes
- Country: United States
- Language: English
- Budget: $225,000 (estimated)

Return of the Fly is a 1959 American horror science-fiction film and sequel to The Fly (1958). It is the second installment in The Fly film series. It was released by 20th Century Fox on July 22, 1959 as a double feature with The Alligator People (1959). It was directed by Edward Bernds. Unlike the previous film, Return of the Fly was shot in black and white.

Vincent Price was the only returning cast member from the original. It was intended that Herbert Marshall reprise his role as the police inspector, but due to illness he was replaced by John Sutton who plays a new character, Inspector Beauchamp.

The film was followed by a second sequel, Curse of the Fly (1965).

== Plot ==
After Hélène Delambre dies, her son, Phillipe Delambre, now an adult, is determined to vindicate his late father by successfully completing the experiment he had worked on. His paternal uncle François refuses to help. Phillipe hires Alan Hinds from Delambre Frere and uses his own finances, but the funds run out before the equipment is complete. When Phillipe threatens to sell his half of Delambre Frere, François relents and funds the completion. After some adjustments, they use the transporter to "store" and later re-materialize test animals.

Alan Hinds turns out to be Ronald Holmes, an industrial spy. Holmes tries to sell the secrets to a shadowy cohort named Max. Before Holmes can get away with the papers, a British agent confronts him. Holmes knocks him out and uses the transporter to "store" the body. When rematerialized, the agent has the paws of a guinea pig that had been disintegrated earlier, and the guinea pig has human hands. Holmes kills the rodent and puts the dead agent in his car, which he sends into the Saint Lawrence River.

Phillipe confronts Holmes about all the oddities. A fight ensues and Phillipe is knocked out. Holmes hides Phillipe the same way he did the agent, but in a twist of malice he catches a fly and adds it to the transporter with him. François re-materializes Phillipe, but with a giant fly head, arm, and leg (whereas the tiny fly has his head, arm, and leg). The fly-headed Phillipe runs into the night, tracking down and killing Max. He waits for Holmes to arrive and kills him, too, then returns home, where Inspector Beauchamp has found and captured the Phillipe-headed fly. Both are placed in the device together and successfully reintegrated, restoring Phillipe to his normal human form.

== Cast ==
- Vincent Price as François Delambre
- Brett Halsey as Philippe Delambre
- David Frankham as Ronald Holmes / Alan Hinds
- Danielle De Metz as Cecile Bonnard
- John Sutton as Inspector Beauchamp
- Dan Seymour as Max Barthold
- Jack Daly as Granville
- Janine Grandel as Mme. Bonnard
- Michael Mark as Gaston
- Richard Flato as Sgt. Dubois
- Barry Bernard as Lt. MacLish
- Pat O'Hara as Inspector Evans
- Francisco Villalobos as The Priest
- Florence Strom as The Nun
- Joan Cotton as The Private Duty Nurse
- Ed Wolff as The Fly-Creature

== Production ==
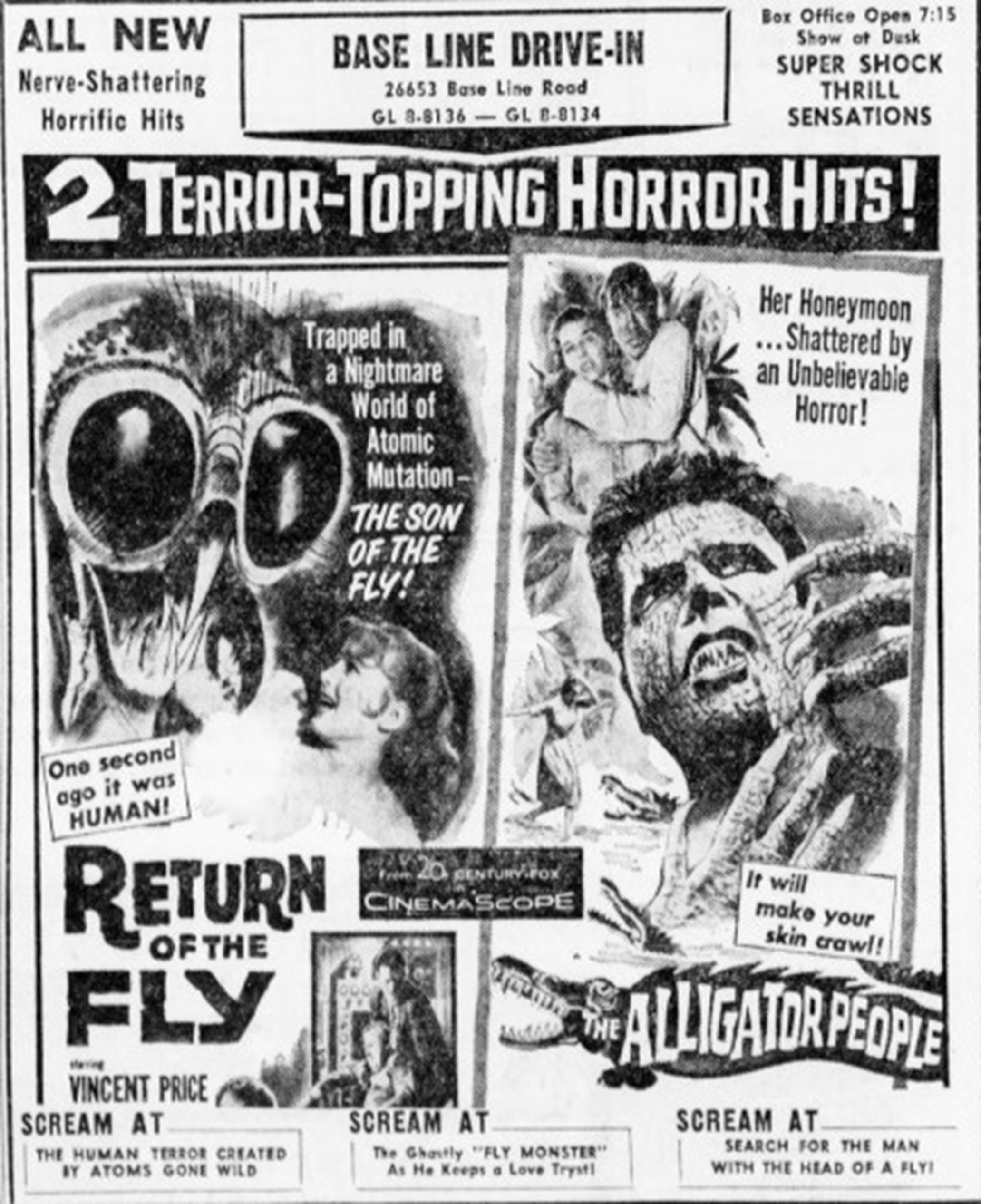
Drive-in advertisement from 1959 for Return of the Fly and co-feature, The Alligator People.

Kurt Neumann, who directed The Fly, died in 1958, so Robert L. Lippert, who financed the original, had to find a new director. He hired director Edward Bernds and producer Bernard Glasser, who had done Space Master X-7 for Lippert. The budget was more than the normal $125,000 for Lippert productions.

He says that the budget was $275,000 – $25,000 of which went to Vincent Price's fee.

Bernds says his original draft of the film incorporated footage from the first Fly film but they were not allowed to use it. He also said Vincent Price insisted on reading the script before signing on to the film. Once he did, he objected when Bernds cut down on some of his scenes for length.

Filming started on 2 February 1959.

During a particular dialogue scene, actor David Frankham rather conspicuously handles a cane, which closely resembles the wolf-head walking stick famously utilized in Universal's film, The Wolf Man (1941).

The script of the film was written specifically to use the standing sets from The Fly (1958), on the Fox lot in Westwood. The film was finished in March 1959 and released as a double bill with The Alligator People in July.

== Release ==
=== Home media ===
Shout! Factory's 2019 Blu-ray release "The Fly Collection" includes all five Fly films plus new audio commentaries. Return of the Fly features a commentary by co-star David Frankham and another by horror film historian Tom Weaver.

== Reception ==
=== Critical response ===
On Rotten Tomatoes, the film holds an approval rating of 36% based on 14 reviews, with a weighted average rating of 4.8/10. Author and film critic Leonard Maltin awarded the film two and a half out of four stars, calling it "[an] adequate sequel to The Fly".

== In popular culture ==
Horror punk band The Misfits pay tribute to the film with their 1978 song "Return of the Fly".

The original Teenage Mutant Ninja Turtles animated series references the film in a third-season episode by the same name.
