= The Phantom Creeps =

1939 film by Ford Beebe

- Theatrical release poster
- Directed by: Ford Beebe; Saul A. Goodkind
- Screenplay by: George Plympton; Basil Dickey
- Story by: Wyllis Cooper
- Produced by: Henry MacRae
- Starring: Béla Lugosi; Dorothy Arnold; Robert Kent
- Cinematography: Jerry Ash; William A. Sickner
- Edited by: Irving Birnbaum; Joseph Gluck; Alvin Todd
- Production company: Universal Pictures
- Distributed by: Universal Pictures
- Release date: January 7, 1939
- Running time: 265 minutes (12 chapters)
- Country: United States
- Language: English

The Phantom Creeps is a 1939 12-chapter science fiction horror serial starring Bela Lugosi as mad scientist Doctor Zorka, who attempts to rule the world by creating various elaborate inventions. In dramatic fashion, foreign agents and G-Men try to seize the inventions for themselves.

It is the 112th serial released by Universal Pictures and the 44th to have sound. It was adapted in DC's Movie Comics #6 with cover date September–October 1939, the final issue of that title.

In 1949, the 265-minute serial was edited for television as a 78-minute feature film:

The 1949 feature version

== Plot ==
Dr. Zorka is a rogue scientist and the inventor of various weapons, including a "devisualizer" belt that can render him invisible, an eight-foot slave robot (Ed Wolff), and robot spiders that can either paralyze or outright destroy their prey. He also has a deadly meteorite fragment from which he extracts an element that can induce suspended animation in an entire army. Foreign spies, operating under the guise of a foreign language school, are trying to acquire the meteorite element by any means necessary while Zorka's former partner, Dr. Fred Mallory, irritated that Zorka will not turn his inventions over to the United States government, alerts Capt. Bob West of the Military Intelligence Department. Tired of answering the door and saying no to the spies and the government, Zorka relocates his laboratory. When his beloved wife is killed, Zorka (who'd been puttering around the lab for his own amusement) is crushed and swears eternal vengeance against anyone trying to use his creations. Dr. Zorka also has aspirations of world domination, and he would have it, too, if not for his assistant Monk, an escaped convict whom Zorka has virtually enslaved. Monk is cowardly, treacherous, and totally incompetent, but his accidental or deliberate interference repeatedly frustrates Dr. Zorka's plans...

== Cast ==
- Bela Lugosi as Dr. Alex Zorka (his final serial appearance, Lugosi received top billing)
- Robert Kent as Capt. Bob West
- Dorothy Arnold as Jean Drew
- Edwin Stanley as Dr. Fred Mallory
- Regis Toomey as Jim Daley
- Jack C. Smith as Monk
- Edward Van Sloan as Jarvis (Ch. 2-12)
- Dora Clement as Ann Zorka (Ch. 1-2)
- Anthony Averill as the henchman Rankin (Ch. 2-12)
- Hugh Huntley as Perkins, Dr. Mallory's lab assistant (Ch. 2-12)
- Monte Vandergrift as the guard Al (Ch. 5)
- Frank Mayo as train engineer (Ch. 6)
- Jim Farley as skipper (Ch. 9; credited as James Farley)
- Eddie Acuff as AMI agent Mac (Ch. 2-12)
- Reed Howes as signalman (Ch. 10)
- Ed Wolff as the robot

== Production ==
The serial contains some similarities with the earlier serial The Vanishing Shadow, such as an invisibility belt and a remote-control robot. Stock footage was used from The Invisible Ray, including scenes of Dr. Zorka finding the meteorite in Africa. As with several Universal serials, some of the stock music came from Bride of Frankenstein. The Phantom Creeps' car chase was itself used as stock footage in later serials. Newsreel shots of the Hindenburg disaster were used as part of Dr. Zorka's final spree of destruction after his robot, which is supposed to destroy the human race, is stopped due to sabotage by Monk after being unleashed.

Universal tried to improve their serials by eliminating the written foreword at the start of each chapter. This led to The Phantom Creeps being the first serial in which the studio used vertically scrolling text as the foreword.

== Influence ==
The Rob Zombie song "Meet the Creeper" is based on the film. Zombie has used robots and props based on the design of Dr. Zorka's robot in several music videos and live shows. The character "Murray the Robot" in Zombie's animated movie The Haunted World of El Superbeasto is also based on this robot. Dr. Zorka's robot also appears on the album cover and music video for the single "Dragula".

A comic book adaptation was published by DC Comics in Movie Comics #6.

The first three chapters of The Phantom Creeps were featured as shorts in season two of Mystery Science Theater 3000. They preceded the episodes Jungle Goddess (#203), Rocket Attack U.S.A. (#205), and Ring of Terror (#206).

Footage from the serial was used in the 1982 video for Automaton by the Canadian band United State.

== Chapter titles ==
The chapters of The Phantom Creeps are:

1. The Menacing Power
2. Death Stalks the Highways
3. Crashing Timbers
4. Invisible Terror
5. Thundering Rails
6. The Iron Monster
7. The Menacing Mist
8. Trapped in the Flames
9. Speeding Doom
10. Phantom Footprints
11. The Blast
12. To Destroy the World

== See also ==
- List of film serials by year
- List of film serials by studio
- List of films in the public domain in the United States

Preceded by The Oregon Trail (1939)	Universal Serial; The Phantom Creeps (1939)	Succeeded by The Green Hornet (1940)
