= The Alligator People =

1959 film

- Theatrical release poster
- Directed by: Roy Del Ruth
- Written by: Orville H. Hampton; Charles O'Neal; Robert M. Fresco (uncredited)
- Produced by: Jack Leewood
- Starring: Beverly Garland; Bruce Bennett; Lon Chaney Jr. George Macready; Frieda Inescort; Richard Crane
- Narrated by: Beverly Garland
- Cinematography: Karl Struss
- Edited by: Harry Gerstad
- Music by: Irving Gertz
- Production company: Associated Producers, Inc
- Distributed by: 20th Century Fox
- Release date: July 22, 1959
- Running time: 74 minutes
- Country: United States
- Language: English
- Budget: $300,000

The Alligator People is a 1959 American CinemaScope science-fiction horror film directed by Roy Del Ruth. It stars Beverly Garland, Bruce Bennett, and Lon Chaney Jr. This film was the penultimate feature directed by Del Ruth, and quite different from those of his days at Warner Bros.

The film was theatrically distributed by 20th Century Fox on July 22, 1959 on a double bill with Return of the Fly.

== Plot ==
After being administered the drug sodium pentothal by two psychiatrists, amnesiac nurse Jane Marvin recalls a series of events from her repressed memories when she was known as Joyce Webster.

In flashbacks, we see Joyce after marrying a young man named Paul Webster. Aboard their honeymoon train, Paul receives a telegram and leaves in a panic to make a phone call. When the train pulls out, Paul is missing, having vanished without a word. Throughout the following months, Joyce employs private detectives and searches for her husband. She eventually finds a lead: the address of the Cypresses Plantation that Paul entered on his college enrollment forms.

Joyce travels to the desolate town of Bayou Landing, Louisiana. There, she meets Manon, a handyman at the Cypresses, and convinces him to drive her to the plantation. Joyce then introduces herself to Lavinia Hawthorne, the Cypresses' stern mistress. When Joyce suggests that Paul once lived there, Lavinia calls her a liar and tries to have her thrown out. However, after learning that Joyce has missed the last train back to town, Lavinia reluctantly invites her to stay the night under the proviso that she must not leave her room.

That night, Joyce hears the strings of a piano and slips out of her room to investigate. Downstairs, she sees a man in a trench coat seated at the piano. The shadowy figure turns out to be Paul, mutated and reptilian-looking. When Joyce enters the room, Paul flees. He later insists to Lavinia that Joyce must leave as soon as possible. The next morning, Mark, the local doctor, comes to the house to question Joyce. Sensing that everyone is withholding information about Paul, she refuses to leave. When Joyce demands that Lavinia tell her what she did to Paul, the older woman breaks down and confesses that he is her son.

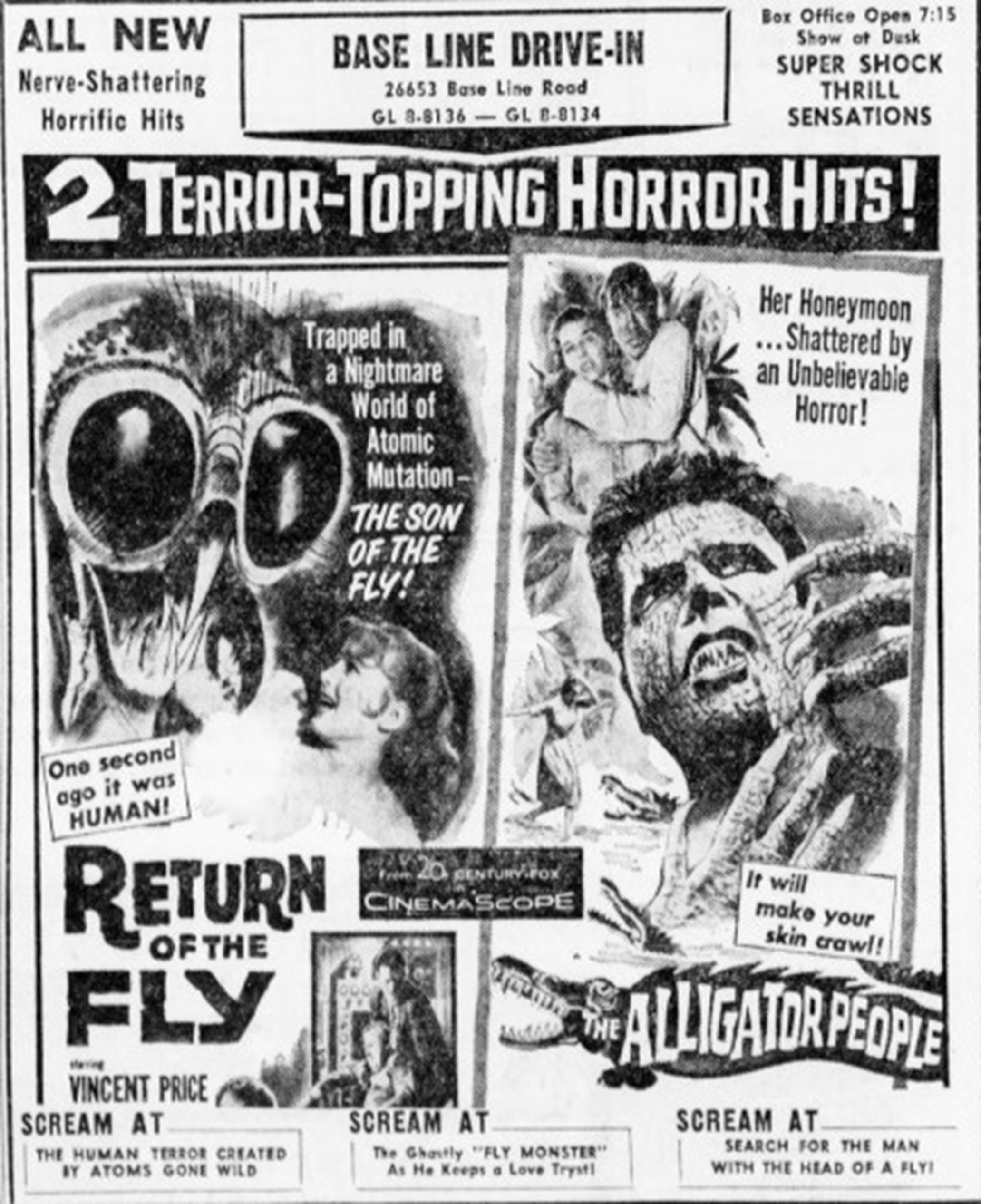
Drive-in advertisement from 1959 for The Alligator People and co-feature, Return of the Fly.

Joyce later sees Paul again and follows him into the swamps. After being menaced by several alligators and a giant snake, Joyce is rescued by Manon, who carries her to his shack. There, he assaults her until she gets knocked unconscious. An outraged Paul then bursts in and fights Manon. After a struggle, Paul manages to incapacitate him and takes Joyce back to the house. Manon recovers and vows to kill Paul. Back at the house, the maid Lou Ann is caring for Joyce while Paul presses Mark to give him an untested cobalt treatment in hopes of curing his condition. Mark agrees to give him the treatment.

The next morning, Mark summons Joyce to his lab and tells her about his experiments with reptilian hormones that are capable of regenerating limbs. After Paul was horribly mangled in a plane crash, Mark administered the serum to him and several other accident victims. The treatment appeared to be a great success, until his patients began to take on reptilian traits. After Paul received the telegram notifying him of this, he hurriedly left the train and came home in hopes of reversing his condition. When Joyce learns of Paul's upcoming cobalt treatment, she insists on being present.

Paul encounters Joyce at the clinic and feels ashamed, but she reassures him of her love. When they start the treatment, Manon bursts into the lab and destroys the control panel. The machine starts shooting powerful rays at Paul that transform him into a bipedal, reptilian monster with an alligator-like head. While trying to attack Paul, Manon gets caught on some cords and is electrocuted. Confused, Paul tries to communicate, but his voice has been replaced with a reptilian snarl. Hearing his wife and mother scream in horror, Paul flees into the swamps. Joyce runs after him, as the cobalt machine short circuits, self-destructs and destroys the lab. Scrambling away from his wife, Paul stumbles into quicksand and slowly sinks out of sight, seemingly meeting his demise.

Back in the present, the psychiatrists review the tapes of Joyce's ordeal. Concluding that her amnesia has allowed her to suppress the horror and resume a normal life, they decide not to tell her about her past.

== Cast ==
- Beverly Garland as Joyce Webster/Jane Marvin
- Bruce Bennett as Dr. Eric Lorimer
- Lon Chaney Jr. as Manon
- George Macready as Dr. Mark Sinclair
- Frieda Inescort as Mrs. Lavinia Hawthorne, Henry's Wife
- Richard Crane as Paul Webster
- Douglas Kennedy as Dr. Wayne MacGregor
- Dudley Dickerson as Train Porter
- Hal K. Dawson as Train Conductor
- Ruby Goodwin as Louann the Maid
- Vince Townsend Jr. as Toby the Butler

== Production ==
Developed for Fox as a co-feature for Return of the Fly, The Alligator People was produced by Jack Leewood for Associated Producers on a budget of $300,000. It was written by Orville H. Hampton (also known for The Snake Woman, Jack the Giant Killer and the Oscar-nominated One Potato, Two Potato), from a script by Hampton and Charles O'Neal (The Seventh Victim); some earlier drafts had been written by an uncredited Robert M. Fresco.

The crew included acclaimed cinematographer Karl Struss and editor Harry Gerstad. The monster make-up was designed by Ben Nye and Dick Smith.

Filming started on February 16, 1959. The film featured music by Irving Gertz, known for his numerous science fiction and horror film scores.

Garland, who also served as the film's narrator, noted that Jane Marvin was one of her favorite roles, although she noted, "The hardest thing in that movie was simply to keep a straight face".

== Reception ==
The Alligator People has been given a mixed reception. On its release, Variety called it "a good program horror film" and praised its "good characterizations".

In his book Atomic Age Cinema: The Offbeat, the Classic and the Obscure, Barry Atkinson said that the film "served up a tasty dish to young horror buffs in the late 1950s."

While praising Struss's photography and the performances of Chaney and Garland, film historian Bill Warren criticized the monster and assessed The Alligator People as a "decently crafted and intelligently made program SF-horror film, sadly let down by misconceived makeup and perfunctory ideas".

== Computer game ==
A 1983 computer game version was in development by 20th Century Fox, programmed by John Russel for the Atari 2600. However, for unknown reasons, the game was never released. The prototype for the game became a bit of a puzzle for prototype collectors as the first copy they found turned out to be a completely different game.

== See also ==
- List of American films of 1959
