= George Langelaan =

British-French writer (1908–1972)

- Born: 19 January 1908; Paris, France
- Died: 9 February 1972 (aged 64)
- Occupations: Spy, writer and journalist
- Known for: "The Fly"

George Langelaan (19 January 1908 – 9 February 1972) was a French-British writer and journalist born in Paris, France.

He is best known for his 1957 short story "The Fly", which was the basis for the 1958 and 1986 sci-fi/horror films, and the 2008 opera.

== Career ==
During World War II, Langelaan worked as a spy and special agent for the Allied powers as part of the Special Operations Executive (SOE). He was in F Section SOE with the rank of lieutenant. His code name was "Langdon". According to his memoirs, The Masks of War (1959), he underwent plastic surgery to alter his appearance before being dropped into France. The surgery was deemed necessary to remove features that were too distinctive. He later explained that his ears were too large and that they had to be pinned back before he could be dropped into enemy territory. He parachuted into occupied France on 7 September 1941 to make contact with the French Resistance forces south of Châteauroux, arranged to meet Édouard Herriot, was captured on 6 October, imprisoned in the Mauzac camp, condemned to death by the Nazis, and escaped (16 July 1942) and returned to England to participate in the Normandy landings. He received the French Croix de guerre.

Langelaan was a friend of the occultist Aleister Crowley, claiming he was a spy and "that by winning the confidence of the Germans in America, he had access to members of their inner circle."

In the 1950s and 1960s he wrote his memoirs, novels, and short stories that were made into motion pictures and were featured on television.

He died on February 9, 1972, less than a month after his 64th birthday.

== Short stories ==
=== "The Fly" ===
Of all his literary works, he is best remembered for his 1957 short story "The Fly", which originally appeared in the June 1957 issue of Playboy magazine. The story itself has been adapted to the screen twice:

- the 1958 film with a screenplay by James Clavell, starring Vincent Price and David Hedison, directed by Kurt Neumann, and distributed by 20th Century Fox in CinemaScope, color by DeLuxe Color;
- the 1986 film with screenplay by Charles Edward Pogue and David Cronenberg, starring Jeff Goldblum and Geena Davis, directed by David Cronenberg, and distributed by 20th Century Fox, in association with Brooksfilms and SLM Production Group.

The 1958 film spawned two sequels; the 1986 film had one.

It was also adapted into an opera by Academy Award-winning composer Howard Shore, which was premiered in 2008 and played Paris' Théâtre du Châtelet, and was directed by David Cronenberg with a libretto by Tony Award-winning playwright David Henry Hwang.

== Bibliography ==
His books and short fiction include:

- One Named Langdon: Memories of a Secret Agent or Un nommé Langdon (1950)
- "The Fly" (in Playboy, June 1957; reprinted in the Second Pan Book of Horror Stories, edited by Herbert Van Thal, 1960)
- "Strange Miracle" (in Argosy, August 1958)
- The Masks of War: From Dunkirk to D-Day—The Masquerades of a British Intelligence Agent (1959) American edition published by Doubleday
- The Knights of the Floating Silk (1959)
- "Elaine" (in Argosy, January 1959)
- "Danse Macabre" (in Argosy, April 1959)
- "Albatross" (in Argosy, December 1959)
- "The Secret Notebooks of Agent P.P. 751" (1960–1963) series in the publication Controls
- "I Rescued a Harem Wife" (in Suspense, August 1960)
- "Cold Blood" (in New Worlds, October 1961)
- "The Other Hand" (in The Magazine of Fantasy & Science Fiction, October 1961)
- "Zombie Express Train" (1964)
- "The Dolphin Speaks Too" (1964)
- Out of Time (collection, 1964)
- "Attack-Rifle-2nd"
- "Torpedo the Torpedo"
- "Salad of Heads" (1965)
- The Flight of Anti-G or Le Vol de l'anti-G (1968)
- "The Thinking Robots" or "The Collector of Brains", "Les Robots pensants" in French
- Turncoat (1967)
- The New Parasites or Les Nouveaux parasites in French, with Jean Barral (1969)
- Thirteen Phantoms or Treize fantomes (1971)

=== Screen adaptations ===
The following movies and television episodes were based on his short stories:

- The Fly (1958) (story)
- The Return of the Fly (1959) (short story "The Fly")
- Alfred Hitchcock Presents episode "Strange Miracle" (1962) (story)
- Curse of the Fly (1965) (concept and characters) (uncredited)
- Temps mort (Time Out) (1968), French TV movie based on his novel
- Night Gallery episode "The Hand of Borgus Weems" (1971) based on his short story "The Other Hand"
- Hyperion (1975) (story)
- Le Collectionneur de cerveaux (The Collector of Brains) (1976) (writer) also known as Les Robots pensants (The Thinking Robots) in French based on Langelaan's novel of the same name
- The Fly remake, or La Mouche in French (1986) (short story)
- The Fly II (1989) (characters)

== Honors ==
His 1957 short story classic "The Fly" received Playboy magazine's Best Fiction Award and was selected for inclusion in the Annual of the Year's Best Science Fiction.
