= Marty Weiser =

American film publicist

Marty Weiser (1912 - August 28, 1988) was an American film publicist. He is best known for his 50-year tenure at Warner Bros., and for his innovative and flamboyant methods of promoting films.

Weiser lived in Rochester, N.Y. and earned degrees in English and Journalism at the University of Rochester.

Weiser began his career with Warner Bros. in the early 1930s as an office boy in their New York headquarters. He quickly transferred to their Exploitation Department, where he worked on his first film, the 1934 B-picture Harold Teen.

Weiser is known for his elaborate and comedic promotional campaigns for films. For Mel Brooks's Blazing Saddles (1974), Weiser invited a large group of horses to a drive-in for the film's premiere.
