= Jack Hedley =

British actor (1929–2021)

- Hedley in 1964
- Born: Jack Snowdon Hawkins; 28 October 1929; London, England
- Died: 11 December 2021 (aged 92); London, England
- Education: Bryanston School, Dorset
- Occupation: Actor
- Years active: 1958–2021
- Spouse(s): Jean Fraser (m. 1965; div. 1984) Elspeth Daintry (m. 1986, divorced) Alex Westendarp (m. 2001)
- Children: 2

Jack Snowdon Hawkins (28 October 1929 – 11 December 2021), better known as Jack Hedley, was an English film, voice, radio, stage, character, theatre, screen and television actor best known for his performances on television. His birth name necessitated a change to avoid confusion with his namesake who was already registered with the British actors' trade union Equity.

== Early life and education ==
Hedley was born in London in 1929. His mother, Dorothy Withill, was 19 when she gave birth to him, and later married Albert Hawkins in 1936, although this man was not his father. He never knew the identity of his biological father. He came from humble beginnings, and used to earn money by collecting sacks of horse manure from the streets and selling them as fertiliser. However, he won a Beaverbrook scholarship to Downleas prep school, then another scholarship to Bryanston School, a boarding and day public school (at the time for boys only), in the village of Bryanston, near the market town of Blandford Forum, in Dorset. He attended Emanuel School in Battersea and then became a cadet at the Britannia Royal Naval College in Dartmouth, where he took a degree in history for 18 months.

He then spent eight years as a Royal Marine Commando, which included active service in Malaya, India, the East Indies, Australia and Korea. He rose from cadet to lieutenant but was eventually invalided out after a bullet smashed the butt of his rifle into his leg.

He was unsure of what to do with his life, when he decided to follow a group of girls into a building and found himself inside RADA drama school. He signed up, and joined at the same time as Glenda Jackson and Alan Bates. He graduated drama school in 1957 with an Acting (RADA Diploma). The day after he graduated, he landed his first acting job, in a Granada Television play in Manchester.

Hedley's mother established a direct mail firm and became a millionaire. After 18 months working in his mother's business, he lost interest.For many years Jack was embarrassed by his origins, and answered questions on his "people" by saying they were either dead or abroad.

== Career ==
Hedley's screen career began with a 13-minute drama-documentary about polio called A Life to be Lived. In the late 1950s, he appeared in films and on television, such as Left Right and Centre, Fair Game and the Alun Owen-scripted television play No Trams to Lime Street with Billie Whitelaw.

Hedley starred in the Francis Durbridge-scripted BBC series The World of Tim Frazer (transmitted from November 1960 to March 1961), the 18 instalments of which comprised three separate serials of six episodes each. He also played Corrigan Blake in Alun Owen's BBC play You Can't Win 'Em All (1962) the role being taken over by John Turner in the series Corrigan Blake that resulted the following year. He was also in Alun Owen's A Little Winter Love (1965), part of the Theatre 625 series.

Hedley appeared in several British films of the 1960s, including Lawrence of Arabia (1962), The Scarlet Blade (1963), Witchcraft (1964), Of Human Bondage (1964), The Secret of Blood Island (1964) and The Anniversary (1968), as well as in the occasional international film such as The Longest Day (1962). He also starred with Stanley Baker and Jean Seberg in the film of Irwin Shaw's In The French Style (1963).

Hedley later appeared in the James Bond film For Your Eyes Only (1981) as Sir Timothy Havelock, also voicing Havelock's parrot. Initially he was reticent to demean himself by playing a parrot, but quickly changed his mind when he found out he would receive £1,200 for ten minutes' work. Soon after this, in the autumn of 1981 he played the lead role (cynical investigative cop Fred Williams) in Lucio Fulci's The New York Ripper (Lo squartatore di New York, 1982), in which his voice was dubbed by American actor Edward Mannix.

Hedley had a lead role as Lt. Colonel Preston in Colditz (1972–74). His other TV appearances include: The Edgar Wallace Mystery Theatre- Never Back Losers (1961),The Saint (1965), Gideon's Way ("The Alibi Man", 1965), Softly, Softly (1967), Dixon of Dock Green (1969), The Buccaneers (1957), the ex-serviceman Alan Haldane in Who Pays the Ferryman? (1977), Return of the Saint (1979), One by One (1984), Remington Steele (also 1984), Only Fools and Horses ("A Royal Flush", 1986), 'Allo 'Allo! (1992), Dalziel and Pascoe (1998) and the TV film version of Brief Encounter (1974).

In the late 1980s Hedley appeared in a comical German advert for After Eight mint chocolates, which proved to be extremely popular and the campaign lasted for five years. It provided him with constantly good fees, and he referred to it as his "pension".

== Personal life ==
Hedley met his first wife Jean Fraser whilst filming The Very Edge (1963) in Ireland; They married in 1965 and got divorced in 1984.

Hedley retired from acting relatively early, admitting that he found the wealth and travel opportunities far more enticing than the urge to perform. He found most actors "a sorry lot" and did not have many friends among them, saying that "Acting is not an art, it is just an interpretation, an actor does not create anything. That is why most of them are so short-sighted".

After a brief illness, Hedley died of a heart attack on 11 December 2021, at the age of 92.

== Filmography ==
Film
Year	Title	Role	Notes
1958	Behind the Mask	Dr. Galbraith	
1959	Room at the Top	Architect	Uncredited
1959	Left Right and Centre	Bill Hemmingway	
1960	Cone of Silence	Second Officer	
1960	Make Mine Mink	Jim Benham	
1961	Never Back Losers	Jim Matthews	Edgar Wallace Mysteries
1962	The Longest Day	Captain, Parachute Regiment	Uncredited
1962	Lawrence of Arabia	Reporter at Lawrence's Funeral	Uncredited
1962	Nine Hours to Rama	Kilpatrick	
1963	The Very Edge	Inspector McInnes	
1963	In the French Style	Bill Norton	
1963	The Scarlet Blade	Edward Beverley, The Scarlet Blade	
1964	Witchcraft	Bill Lanier	
1964	Of Human Bondage	Griffiths	
1964	The Secret of Blood Island	Crewe	
1967	How I Won the War	Melancholy Musketeer	
1968	The Anniversary	Terry Taggart	
1969	Goodbye, Mr. Chips	William Baxter	
1974	Brief Encounter	Graham Jesson	
1977	The Devil's Advocate	Vatican Doctor	
1981	For Your Eyes Only	Sir Timothy Havelock	
1982	The New York Ripper	Lt. Fred Williams	
1987	Three Kinds of Heat	Kirkland	
1990	The Plot to Kill Hitler	General Adolf Heusinger	
1997	Character	Mr. Forester	
2000	Paul the Apostle	High Priest	
