= David Frankham =

English retired actor (born 1926)

- Born: 16 February 1926 (age 100); Gillingham, Kent, England
- Occupation: Actor
- Years active: 1948–1993 • 2010 • 2012 • 2018

David Frankham (born 16 February 1926) is an English actor.

== Biography ==
Frankham served in the British Army during World War II. He was deployed to pre-independence India, where anti-British sentiment was very high. He also served in Malaya. After his discharge from the army, Frankham worked first as a news reader, and then a writer, interviewer and producer for the BBC from 1948 to 1955.

In 1955, Frankham moved to Hollywood to pursue a career as an actor. He soon found work, appearing on five episodes of the live television program Matinee Theatre. He worked in television, in addition to appearing in films such as Return of the Fly (1959), Ten Who Dared (1960), Master of the World (1961), Tales of Terror (1962), The Spiral Road (1962), King Rat (1965), and The Great Santini (1979). Frankham provided the voice of Sergeant Tibbs the cat in Walt Disney's One Hundred and One Dalmatians (1961).

Frankham appeared in guest roles on American television from the late 1950s to the 1980s. His career included roles on such shows as Thriller, GE True, Twelve O'Clock High, The F.B.I., Gomer Pyle, U.S.M.C., The Beverly Hillbillies, The Outer Limits, Star Trek (episode "Is There in Truth No Beauty?"), Cannon, The Waltons, and McCloud during the 1970s. In November 2012, Frankham's autobiography Which One Was David? was published by BearManor Media.

== Partial filmography ==
- Johnny Tremain (1957) – British Officer (uncredited)
- Alfred Hitchcock Presents (1958) (Season 3 Episode 38: "Impromptu Murder") – Holsom
- Return of the Fly (1959) – Ronald Holmes, alias Alan Hinds
- Ten Who Dared (1960) – Frank Goodman
- One Hundred and One Dalmatians (1961) – Sergeant Tibbs and Scottie (voice)
- Master of the World (1961) – Phillip Evans
- Alfred Hitchcock Presents (1962) (Season 7 Episode 13: "The Silk Petticoat") – Phillip Haven
- Tales of Terror (1962) – Dr. James (segment "The Case of M. Valdemar")
- The Spiral Road (1962) – Drager's Replacement (uncredited)
- The Outer Limits (1963) (Season 1 Episode 10: "Nightmare") – Capt. Terrence Ralph Brookman
- The Alfred Hitchcock Hour (1964) (Season 2 Episode 19: "Murder Case") – Peter
- King Rat (1965) – Cox
- Star Trek: The Original Series (1968) (Season 3 Episode 5: "Is There in Truth No Beauty?") – Larry Marvick
- The Great Santini (1979) – Captain Weber
- Wrong Is Right (1982) – British Reporter
- Ink: A Tale of Captivity (2010) – Country Gentleman (final film role)
- The House of the Seven Gables (2018) – The Storyteller (voice-over role)
- Plummet to Adventure (TBA) – Squadron Leader Thrilling
