= Ed Wolff (actor) =

American actor (1907–1966)

- Born: July 2, 1907; Trinidad, Colorado, U.S.
- Died: July 7, 1966 (aged 59); Los Angeles, California, U.S.
- Occupation: Actor

Ed Wolff (July 2, 1907 — July 7, 1966) was an American actor. He was known for his height of 7'4" and for his monster roles in The Phantom of the Opera (1925), The Phantom Creeps (1939), Invaders from Mars (1953), The Colossus of New York (1958) and Return of the Fly (1959).

== Biography ==
Wolff was born on July 2, 1907, in Trinidad, Colorado.

Before becoming an actor, he was a circus giant. With limited opportunities to perform in films, Wolff found employment as a house painter, and he worked in carnivals and amusement parks.

His first movie as an actor was The Phantom of the Opera in 1925 at age 18.

Wolf died on July 7, 1966, in Los Angeles, California, five days after his 59th birthday.

== Filmography ==
Year	Title	Role	Notes
1925	The Phantom of the Opera	Mob Leader at Finale	Uncredited
1932	Hypnotized	Tall Man	Uncredited
1939	The Phantom Creeps	The Robot	Serial
1941	Meet Boston Blackie	Giant	Uncredited
1948	Hills of Home	Giant	Uncredited
1953	Invaders from Mars	Mutant	Uncredited
1954	3 Ring Circus	Circus Giant	Uncredited
1958	The Colossus of New York	The Colossus	Uncredited
1959	Return of the Fly	Philippe as The Fly	Uncredited
1959	The Flying Fontaines	Giant	Uncredited, (final film role)
