= Witchcraft (1964 film) =

1964 British film by Don Sharp

- Theatrical release poster
- Directed by: Don Sharp
- Written by: Harry Spalding
- Produced by: Robert L. Lippert; Jack Parsons
- Starring: Lon Chaney Jr. Jack Hedley; Jill Dixon
- Cinematography: Arthur Lavis
- Edited by: Robert Winter
- Music by: Carlo Martelli
- Color process: Black and white
- Production company: Lippert Pictures
- Distributed by: 20th Century-Fox
- Release dates: March 1964 (UK); September 1964 (USA)
- Running time: 79 minutes
- Country: United Kingdom
- Language: English

Witchcraft (also known as Witches and Warlocks) is a 1964 British horror film directed by Don Sharp and starring Lon Chaney Jr., Jack Hedley and Jill Dixon. The script was written by Harry Spalding.

== Plot ==
In the 17th century, the Lanier family accuses Vanessa Whitlock of witchcraft, in a ploy to take over the Whitlock family's properties; Vanessa is convicted and buried alive. As a consequence, the Whitlock family maintains a bitter hatred of the Laniers to the present day. However, Amy Whitlock and Todd Lanier fall in love despite the objections of Amy's stern uncle, Morgan Whitlock.

Todd is a business associate of his older brother, Bill. They are building developers who plan to transform the old Whitlock estate. Without their knowledge, their business partner, Myles Forrester, instructs his workers to bulldoze the old Whitlock Cemetery, enraging Morgan. From one of the graves emerges Vanessa Whitlock, still alive after three centuries. The Whitlocks still practice the old religion, and Morgan leads a coven that embraces Vanessa's return. Vanessa uses her powers to cause the mysterious deaths of Forrester and Helen Lanier, Bill and Todd's aunt. Morgan is arrested as a suspect in the Forrester case, and the Laniers take in Amy while her uncle is in custody. Vanessa unsuccessfully tries to kill Bill, Todd and their grandmother Malvina.

While Bill and Todd are away on business, Bill's wife Tracy follows Amy to the old Whitlock mansion, now residence of the Laniers. In a secret chamber deep inside the Whitlock family crypt, Tracy witnesses Amy, Morgan and the rest of the coven performing magic rites that include sacrificing an infant. Tracy is captured and tied up, to be used as another sacrifice. Bill and Todd enter the Whitlock crypt looking for Tracy and rescue her. Todd returns to the crypt to look for Amy. As Morgan is about to kill Todd, Amy is pushed past her breaking point and tips over a giant brazier that sets Vanessa and the entire room on fire. Todd tries to reach Amy but the entire crypt has turned into a raging inferno, which soon extends to the adjoining mansion. Screaming her name, he can only watch as the flames consume everything and everyone.

Later, a broken Todd joins his family outside and watches the Whitlock estate burn to the ground, ending the 300-year-old feud.

== Cast ==
- Lon Chaney Jr. as Morgan Whitlock (as Lon Chaney)
- Jack Hedley as Bill Lanier
- Jill Dixon as Tracy Lanier
- Viola Keats as Helen Lanier
- Marie Ney as Malvina Lanier
- David Weston as Todd Lanier
- Diane Clare as Amy Whitlock
- Yvette Rees as Vanessa Whitlock
- Barry Linehan as Myles Forrester
- Victor Brooks as Inspector Baldwin
- Marianne Stone as Forrester's secretary
- John Dunbar as doctor
- Hilda Fenemore as nurse (as Hilda Fennemore)

== Production ==
Writer Harry Spalding says he got the idea to make a film from an incident that happened in San Francisco when an old cemetery was converted into a real estate development.

Don Sharp had received good notices for his direction of Kiss of the Vampire (1963) and was receiving lots of offers to do horror movies. He says Milton Subotsky wanted to work with Sharp and offered him a choice of three scripts to make but Sharp liked none of them. He wound up making Witchcraft.

Sharp liked the script for Witchcraft, calling it "a damn good story", although he felt that it suffered credibility problems being set in the present day.

According to one account the film was shot over 14 days, which was twice what Robert L. Lippert such productions took in the US. Sharp said in an interview that it took twenty days. Filming took place in January 1964 at Shepperton Studios just after 110 technicians had been fired from the studio.

Spalding says that director Don Sharp "realized the thing very well" and burnt down an actual house for the climax.

== Release ==
Witchcraft was released in the UK in March 1964 and in the U.S. later the same year.

Don Sharp says the film received "marvellous notices" and claimed that because the film was so cheap to make it made its cost back in "the first two weeks in California".

== Critical reception ==
The Monthly Film Bulletin wrote: "This is an unpretentious and uncommonly gripping horror film, directed by Don Sharp rather after the style of the Val Lewton films. The backgrounds are quietly realistic, with grey, atmospheric photography, matter-of-fact underplaying from Jack Hedley and Jill Dixon, and a more tormented, grander style of acting from the ambiguous Malvina (Marie Ney. ... [Lon Chaney] huffs and puffs to a degree where he seems not only out of place but completely out of his own control and everybody's else's."

Variety wrote: "Eerie music, low-key photography, competent acting and a gimmick-filled plot combine to make the horror-feature Witchcraft a good example of its kind. The Robert Lippert-Jack Parsons production has the added feature of a plastic 'witch deflector' for each viewer. This, along with heavy sell-promotion, should attract audiences addicted to horror films. ...Chaney tended to overact, but others in cast handled chores in workmanlike fashion, with Diane Clare particularly appealing as the ingénue. Arthur Lavis' photography was competent for a horror story, with murky shots of church steeples and graveyards through ever-present fog."

Leslie Halliwell said: "Spasmodically arresting horror film spoiled by too complex a plot line and some variable acting."

== Home media ==
Witchcraft was released on Region 1 DVD, along with Devils of Darkness as part of the Midnite Movies range of classic and cult horror films, in 2007.

== See also ==
- List of films about witchcraft
