= Yvette Rees =

Welsh actress (1924–1993)

Yvette Rees (22 May 1924 – 1993), born Eiros Yvette Rees, was a Welsh actress who appeared in many TV series and several noteworthy films in the 1960s.

Born in Swansea, she trained at RADA, graduating in 1949. She is perhaps best remembered for her memorable role in 1964's Witchcraft as the witch Vanessa Whitlock, who returns from the grave to avenge being buried alive several hundred years previously. In the mid-1970s she moved to Australia, where she continued to work on TV and film until 1979, when she appears to have retired.

She was married to Morten Smith-Petersen. Through her son Simon, who also worked in TV and cinema, she was the grandmother of stuntman Ben Smith-Petersen. She died in Ealing in 1993.

== Films and TV ==
- 1960: The Days of Vengeance (TV Series) – Mrs. Collins
- 1960: Here Lies Miss Sabry (TV Series) – Janet
- 1962: Out of This World (TV Series) – Mrs. Chalmers
- 1960-1962: Dixon of Dock Green (TV Series) – Carol Small / Lil
- 1963: Suspense (TV Series) – The Relief Nurse
- 1964: Witchcraft – Vanessa Whitlock
- 1964: Z Cars (TV Series) – Mrs. McLean
- 1964: Catch Hand (TV Series) – Elvira Peters
- 1964: The Likely Lads (TV Series) – Freda Windsor
- 1964: Troubled Waters – Sally Driscoll
- 1965: Monitor (TV Series documentary) – Stage Madame Bardac
- 1965: Curse of the Fly – Wan
- 1965: 199 Park Lane (TV Series) – Alex Kovacs
- 1965: The Wednesday Play (TV Series)
- 1970: Julius Caesar – Plebeian #4
- 1970: Paul Temple (TV Series) – Gibbs
- 1970: A Severed Head – Woman at Party #2
- 1971: The Trojan Women – Woman #33
- 1971: The Troubleshooters (TV Series) – Dr. Eve Gorman
- 1973: Cheri (TV Movie) – Constance
- 1979: Prisoner (TV Series) – Marjorie Whitton
- 1979: Thirst – Nurse (final film role)
