= The Fly (Langelaan short story) =

- Short story by George Langelaan
- Country: United Kingdom
- Language: English
- Genres: Science fiction, horror

Publication
- Published in: Playboy
- Publication date: June 1957

"The Fly" is a science fiction horror short story by French-British writer George Langelaan. It was published in the June 1957 issue of Playboy magazine. It appeared in SF The Year's Greatest Science-Fiction and Fantasy, Dell First Edition B119, 1958. It was first filmed in 1958, and then again in 1986. An opera of the same name by Howard Shore premiered at the Théâtre du Châtelet, Paris, in 2008. The short story "The Fly" is included in Langelaan's short story collection Out of Time (1964). It is also included in the anthology The Permanent Playboy (Crown, 1959) and in The Second Pan Book of Horror Stories (1960).

== Plot ==
The story begins late at night when François Delambre is awakened by a phone call from his sister-in-law Hélène, who tells him that she has just killed his brother and that he should call the police. He does, and they find the mangled remains of his brother in the family factory, his head and arm crushed under a hydraulic machine press.

Hélène seems surprisingly calm throughout the investigation, willing to answer all questions except one: she will not give the reason for killing him. Eventually she is sent to a mental asylum, and François is given custody of his brother's young son, Henri. François visits her often, but she never explains the question he most desperately wants answered. Then one day, Henri inquires about the length of a housefly's lifespan and says he saw the fly his mother wants to catch, which has a white head. Realizing that this might somehow hold a clue to the murder, François confronts her with the news that Henri spotted a strange fly, and Hélène becomes extremely agitated. François threatens to go to the police and tell them what he knows about the insect if she doesn't tell him what he wants to know. She relents and tells him to come back the next day, when he will receive his explanation. The next day she gives him a handwritten manuscript, and later that night he reads it.

His brother, André Delambre, was a brilliant research scientist who had just made an amazing discovery. Using machines that he called disintegrator-reintegrators, André could instantaneously transfer matter from one location to another through space. He had two such machines in his basement, one being used as a transmitter pod, the other as a receiver. Hélène's manuscript reveals that at first André encountered several flukes, including an experiment in which he transmitted an ashtray that reintegrated in the receiver pod with the words "Made in Japan" on the back written backward. He also tried transmitting the family cat, which disintegrated perfectly but then never reappeared. Eventually, however, he ironed out the mistakes and found that the invention worked perfectly. Then one day André tried the experiment on himself. Unbeknownst to him, a housefly had entered the transmitter pod with him, and when he emerged from the receiver, his head and arm had been switched with the insect's.

André tells Hélène that his only hope of salvation is for her to find the fly, identifiable by its completely white head, so he can transmit himself with it again in hopes of regaining his missing atoms. A search of the house proves fruitless, and in desperation, Hélène begs him to go through once more, hoping the transformation might reverse itself. Not believing it will work, but wanting to humor her, he agrees and goes through. He trips when he steps out of the receiver, and the cloth covering his head falls off. Hélène screams. His accident had switched his head and arm with those of a fly, and this last experiment mixed in parts from the missing cat. Now realizing that he has been transformed beyond all hope, André destroys the pods and all of the work in his lab and devises a way to commit suicide while at the same time hiding from the world what he had become. He shows Hélène how to operate the hydraulic press and then places himself under it. Obeying his last wish, Hélène pushes the button to lower the press and kills her husband.

François goes to see Hélène the next day but receives heartbreaking news. Unable to live with her memories, she committed suicide by cyanide during the night. Later that evening, François invites Inspector Charas, the policeman in charge of the case, over to his house for dinner. After they finish their meal, François lets him read Hélène's manuscript. After reading it, Charas declares that Hélène must have been mad, and they both decide to destroy the "confession". But just as the story ends, François tells Charas that earlier that day he killed a fly and buried it at his brother's graveside. It was a fly with a white head.

== Reception ==
The Jungian analyst Marie-Louise von Franz discusses the story in her lectures on "The Inferior Function", an aspect of the theory of psychological types. She describes it as an "example of inferior introverted intuition" that "illustrates the disgusting form and desperate abyss into which the inferior function can lead". After summarising the plot (adding "I have spared you most of the disgusting and perverse details in the story, which are expounded with great gusto"), she comments:

There one sees how inferior intuition takes shape in a sensation production. Since the story is written by a sensation type, it gets disguised as completely practical sensation. The fly would represent inferior intuition, which gets mixed up with the conscious personality. A fly is a devilish insect. In general, flies represent involuntary fantasies and thoughts that annoy one and buzz around in one’s head and that one cannot chase away. Here, this scientist gets caught and victimized by an idea that involves murder and madness. … At the end of the story the commissioner of police talks to the author and says that the woman was, after all, just mad. One sees that he would represent collective common sense – the verdict finally adopted by the writer, who admits that all this is just madness. If the writer had established the continuity of his inferior function, and had freed it from his extroverted sensation, then a really pure and clean story would have come out. In genuine fantasies, such as those of Edgar Allan Poe and the poet Gustav Meyrinck, intuition is established in its own right. These fantasies are highly symbolic and can be interpreted in a symbolic way. But a sensation type always wants to concretize his intuitions in some way.

== Adaptations ==
=== Screen adaptations ===
The following films were based on this short story:

- The Fly is a 1958 film which starred David Hedison as André Delambre, Patricia Owens as Hélène Delambre, and Vincent Price as François Delambre.
- Return of the Fly, released in 1959, is the first sequel to the 1958 film. While Vincent Price reprises his role of François Delambre, Brett Halsey stars as André Delambre's son Phillipe Delambre.
- Curse of the Fly (1965; the second and final sequel to the 1958 film) starred George Baker as Martin Delambre, Brian Donlevy as Henry Delambre, and Carole Gray as Patricia Stanley.
- The Fly (1986) starred Jeff Goldblum as Seth Brundle (who fills the same role as André Delambre), Geena Davis as Veronica Quaife, and John Getz as Stathis Borans.
- The Fly II is the 1989 sequel to the 1986 film. While John Getz was the only one to reprise his role from the first film, Eric Stoltz stars as Martin Brundle (the son of Seth Brundle and Veronica Quaife) with the supporting cast consisting of Daphne Zuniga as Beth Logan and Lee Richardson as Anton Bartok.

=== Opera ===
There is also a Fly opera:

- The Fly is 2008 opera by Howard Shore that is based on the 1986 film.

=== Miscellaneous ===
- The Fly appears in the Merrie Melodies short The Night of the Living Duck.
- In the Hanna-Barbera cartoon Gravedale High, the character Busby is based on the Fly.
- The Fly appears in Hotel Transylvania and Hotel Transylvania 2, voiced by Chris Parnell. He works as Hotel Transylvania's fitness coordinator.
- Series 14 of Lego Minifigures has the Fly Monster who is based on the Fly.
- The Fly is parodied in The Simpsons episode "Treehouse of Horror VIII", where Bart switches his body with that of a fly.
- In two iterations of the Teenage Mutant Ninja Turtles franchise - the 1987 and 2012 animated series - Baxter Stockman is transformed into a fly-like mutant. In the 1987 series, Stockman was mutated after being caught in a disintegration chamber along with a fly, a scenario akin to The Fly.

The story received Playboy magazine's Best Fiction Award for the year, and was selected for inclusion in the Annual of the Year's Best Science Fiction.
