= Ben Nye =

American makeup artist and businessman

- Born: Benjamin Emmet Nye, Sr. January 12, 1907; Fremont, Nebraska, U.S.
- Died: February 9, 1986 (aged 79); Santa Monica, California, U.S.
- Occupations: Makeup artist, businessman
- Children: 2

Benjamin Emmet Nye, Sr. (January 12, 1907 – February 9, 1986) was an American makeup artist for the Hollywood film industry for over four decades, from the 1930s to the early 1980s. He worked on over five hundred 20th Century Fox films both in and out of Hollywood. Notable films he worked on included Gone with the Wind (1939), Miracle on 34th Street (1947), Gentlemen Prefer Blondes (1953), The King and I (1956), The Fly (1958), Valley of the Dolls (1967), and Planet of the Apes (1968).

Nye officially retired in 1967 and created the Ben Nye Makeup Company. Nye, Sr. left his son Dana in charge of the company as CEO. Nye's son, Ben, Jr., also works in the film makeup industry. Nye died on February 9, 1986, in Santa Monica, California, at the age of 79.
