= List of 20th Century Fox films (1980–1989) =

This is a list of films produced by 20th Century Fox (now 20th Century Studios) beginning in 1980 up until 1989.

== 1980 ==
Release date	Title	Notes
February 1, 1980	Fatso	co-production with Brooksfilms
April 2, 1980	Inferno	theatrical distribution only; produced by Produzioni Intersound
May 1980	Headin' for Broadway	
May 21, 1980	The Empire Strikes Back	Inducted into the National Film Registry in 2010 distribution only; produced by Lucasfilm
June 20, 1980	Brubaker	
June 27, 1980	The Stunt Man	Nominated for the Golden Globe Award for Best Motion Picture – Drama; North American, U.K. and Irish distribution only; produced by Melvin Simon Productions
July 11, 1980	Oh Heavenly Dog	co-production with Mulberry Square Productions
July 25, 1980	Middle Age Crazy	North American distribution only; produced by Canadian Film Development Corporation, Guardian Trust Company, Krofft Entertainment and Tormont Films
August 15, 1980	Willie & Phil	
September 12, 1980	Health	co-production with Lion's Gate Films
September 26, 1980	My Bodyguard	distribution only; produced by Melvin Simon Productions
October 3, 1980	The Man with Bogart's Face	distribution only; produced by Melvin Simon Productions
October 3, 1980	Terror Train	U.S., U.K. and Irish distribution only; produced by Astral Films
October 6, 1980	Kagemusha	Nominated for the Academy Award for Best Foreign Language Film distribution outside Japan only; produced by Toho
October 24, 1980	Loving Couples	distribution only; produced by Time-Life Films (Note: Owned by Warner Bros. (via HBO))
December 1, 1980	A Change of Seasons	theatrical distribution only; produced by Film Finance Group and Polyc International BV
December 14, 1980	Tribute	distribution only; produced by Tiberius Films and The Turman-Foster Company
December 19, 1980	Nine to Five	co-production with IPC Films

== 1981 ==
Release date	Title	Notes
February 6, 1981	Fort Apache, The Bronx	distribution only; produced by Time-Life Films
February 13, 1981	Eyewitness	
March 6, 1981	On the Right Track	distribution only; produced by Zephyr Productions
March 20, 1981	Omen III: The Final Conflict	co-production with Mace Neufeld Productions
April 3, 1981	Hardly Working	North American distribution only
May 1, 1981	Savage Harvest	North American distribution only
May 21, 1981	Death Hunt	distribution only; produced by Golden Harvest Company (Note: Owned by Star China Media (via Fortune Star Media Limited))
June 12, 1981	History of the World, Part I	North American distribution only; co-production with Brooksfilms (Note: Fox has since reclaimed international distribution rights to this film)
June 19, 1981	The Cannonball Run	distribution only; produced by Golden Harvest
July 17, 1981	Zorro, The Gay Blade	distribution only; produced by Melvin Simon Productions
August 28, 1981	Chu Chu and the Philly Flash	distribution only; produced by Melvin Simon Productions
September 1981	The Woman Inside	theatrical distribution only
September 25, 1981	Southern Comfort	distribution only; produced by Cinema Group Ventures (Note: Owned by MGM)
October 9, 1981	Tattoo	North American distribution only
October 31, 1981	Shock Treatment	
December 18, 1981	Taps	
December 25, 1981	Modern Problems	

== 1982 ==
Release date	Title	Notes
February 12, 1982	The Amateur	distribution only; produced by Anabasis Investments, N.V.
February 12, 1982	Quest for Fire	U.S., U.K. and Irish distribution only; produced by International Cinema Corporation and Famous Players
February 12, 1982	Melanie	Canadian distribution only
March 5, 1982	Making Love	
March 19, 1982	Porky's	distribution outside Australia and New Zealand theatrically and Canadian home media only; produced by Melvin Simon Productions and Astral Films
March 24, 1982	Eating Raoul	North American theatrical co-distribution under 20th Century-Fox International Classics with Quartet Films only (Note: Owned by Mercury Film, Inc., with select distribution rights licensed to Sony Pictures (under Destination Films) and Janus Films)
March 26, 1982	I Ought to Be in Pictures	
April 9, 1982	Chariots of Fire	International distribution only; co-production with Allied Stars Ltd and Enigma Productions; North American distribution handled by The Ladd Company (through Warner Bros.)
May 28, 1982	Visiting Hours	distribution only; produced with the participation of the Canadian Film Development Corporation
June 18, 1982	Author! Author!	
June 25, 1982	Megaforce	North American distribution only; produced by Golden Harvest
July 16, 1982	Young Doctors in Love	North American distribution only; produced by ABC Motion Pictures
July 16, 1982	Six Pack	
August 6, 1982	The Pirate Movie	
October 9, 1982	I, the Jury	North American distribution only; produced by American Cinema Productions
October 22, 1982	Monsignor	
October 29, 1982	National Lampoon's Class Reunion	North American distribution only; produced by ABC Motion Pictures
November 5, 1982	The Man from Snowy River	North American distribution only; produced by Cambridge Productions and Edgley International
December 8, 1982	The Verdict	Nominee of the Academy Award for Best Picture; Nominated for the Golden Globe Award for Best Motion Picture – Drama
December 10, 1982	The Hot Touch	U.S., UK and Irish distribution only; produced by Astral Films
December 17, 1982	The Who Rocks America	distribution only; produced by Curbishley-Baird Productions in association with Schlitz; Pay per view premiere release
December 22, 1982	Kiss Me Goodbye	

== 1983 ==
Release date	Title	Notes
February 4, 1983	The Entity	co-production with American Cinema Productions
February 4, 1983	Without a Trace	
February 18, 1983	The King of Comedy	North and Latin American, U.K., Irish, Australian, New Zealand and Indian theatrical distribution only; produced by Embassy International Pictures
February 19, 1983	Betrayal	North American distribution under 20th Century-Fox International Classics only
March 25, 1983	Max Dugan Returns	
April 1, 1983	Heart Like a Wheel	North American, U.K. and Irish distribution only
May 20, 1983	Tough Enough	co-production with American Cinema Productions
May 20, 1983	Bill Cosby: Himself	co-production with SAH Enterprises
May 25, 1983	Return of the Jedi	Inducted into the National Film Registry in 2021 distribution only; produced by Lucasfilm
June 24, 1983	Porky's II: The Next Day	distribution only; produced by Simon/Reeves/Landsburg Productions and Astral Films
July 22, 1983	Mr. Mom	North American distribution only; produced by Sherwood Productions
August 5, 1983	The Star Chamber	
August 10, 1983	Phar Lap	distribution only; produced by Hoyts Edgley
August 27, 1983	Fire and Ice	North American theatrical distribution only; produced by PSO
October 14, 1983	The Osterman Weekend	North American theatrical distribution only; produced by Davis-Panzer Productions
October 21, 1983	All the Right Moves	
November 18, 1983	A Night in Heaven	
December 14, 1983	Silkwood	Nominated for the Golden Globe Award for Best Motion Picture – Drama; North American distribution only; produced by ABC Motion Pictures
December 16, 1983	Two of a Kind	
December 16, 1983	To Be or Not to Be	co-production with Brooksfilms

== 1984 ==
Release date	Title	Notes
1984	The Secret Diary of Sigmund Freud	U.S. distribution only
January 1, 1984	Careful, He Might Hear You	North American theatrical distribution only
February 10, 1984	Unfaithfully Yours	
February 17, 1984	Blame It on Rio	North American distribution only; produced by Sherwood Productions
March 30, 1984	Antarctica	North American theatrical distribution only
March 30, 1984	Romancing the Stone	
April 4, 1984	The Stone Boy	distribution only
April 13, 1984	Kidco	
May 4, 1984	The Buddy System	
June 21, 1984	Rhinestone	
June 29, 1984	Bachelor Party	
July 9, 1984	The Gods Must Be Crazy	International distribution only, distributed in South Africa by Ster-Kinekor
July 20, 1984	Revenge of the Nerds	co-production with Interscope Communications
August 10, 1984	The Adventures of Buckaroo Banzai Across the 8th Dimension!	North American distribution only; produced by Sherwood Productions
August 10, 1984	Dreamscape	North American distribution only; produced by Zupnik-Curtis Enterprises (Note: Owned by Shout! Studios (via Westchester Films))
September 28, 1984	Impulse	North American distribution only; produced by ABC Motion Pictures
October 23, 1984	Give My Regards to Broad Street	co-production with MPL Communications
November 2, 1984	Paris, Texas	North American distribution only; produced by Road Movies Filmproduktion (Note: Owned by the Wim Wenders Foundation, with commercial rights licensed to HanWay Films, which has sub-licensed U.S. distribution rights to Janus Films and The Criterion Collection) and Argos Films
November 16, 1984	Gimme an 'F'	
December 21, 1984	The Flamingo Kid	North American distribution only; produced by ABC Motion Pictures and Mercury Productions
December 21, 1984	Johnny Dangerously	

== 1985 ==
Release date	Title	Notes
February 8, 1985	Mischief	
February 15, 1985	Turk 182	co-production with Interscope Communications and Astral Films
March 22, 1985	Porky's Revenge	distribution only; produced by Melvin Simon Productions and Astral Films
March 29, 1985	Almost You	
April 12, 1985	Ladyhawke	International distribution only; co-production with Warner Bros.
April 19, 1985	Moving Violations	
May 10, 1985	Secret Places	U.S. distribution only; produced by The Rank Organisation
June 13, 1985	Prizzi's Honor	Nominated for the Academy Award for Best Picture; Winner of the Golden Globe Award for Best Motion Picture – Drama; North American distribution only; produced by ABC Motion Pictures
June 21, 1985	Cocoon	Nominated for the Golden Globe Award for Best Motion Picture – Musical or Comedy
July 19, 1985	The Man with One Red Shoe	
August 9, 1985	Dance with a Stranger	U.K. and Irish distribution only; produced by Goldcrest Films; U.S. distribution handled by The Samuel Goldwyn Company
August 14, 1985	Key Exchange	distribution only
August 23, 1985	Warning Sign	
September 20, 1985	Joshua Then and Now	North American distribution only
September 20, 1985	Plenty	North American theatrical distribution only; produced by Thorn EMI Screen Entertainment (Note: Owned by StudioCanal, with U.S. distribution handled by Lionsgate) and RKO Pictures
October 4, 1985	The Doctor and the Devils	co-production with Brooksfilms
October 4, 1985	Commando	co-production with Silver Pictures
October 6, 1985	The Park Is Mine	co-production with Astral Films and HBO Premiere Films
November 22, 1985	Bad Medicine	
December 11, 1985	The Jewel of the Nile	
December 18, 1985	Brazil	International distribution only; produced by Embassy International Pictures; North American distribution handled by Universal Pictures
December 20, 1985	Enemy Mine	co-production with Kings Road Productions

== 1986 ==
Release date	Title	Notes
January 17, 1986	The Boy in Blue	co-production with Canadian Broadcasting Corporation and Telefilm Canada
January 31, 1986	Stripper	distribution only; produced by Embassy International Pictures
January 31, 1986	Power	distribution only; produced by Lorimar Motion Pictures (Note: Owned by Warner Bros.)
February 14, 1986	The Vindicator	U.S. distribution only
March 7, 1986	Death of an Angel	U.S. distribution only
March 7, 1986	Highlander	North American, German and Austrian theatrical distribution only; produced by Thorn EMI Screen Entertainment and Davis-Panzer Productions
March 28, 1986	Lucas	
April 18, 1986	Legend	International distribution only; produced by Embassy International Pictures; North American distribution handled by Universal Pictures
June 6, 1986	SpaceCamp	North American distribution only; produced by ABC Motion Pictures
June 13, 1986	The Manhattan Project	North American theatrical and television distribution only; produced by Gladden Entertainment
July 2, 1986	Big Trouble in Little China	
July 18, 1986	Aliens	co-production with Brandywine Productions
August 14, 1986	The Boy Who Could Fly	North American, U.K. and Irish theatrical distribution only; produced by Lorimar Motion Pictures
August 15, 1986	The Fly	co-production with Brooksfilms
September 19, 1986	The Name of the Rose	North American theatrical distribution only; produced by Nelson Entertainment, Neue Constantin Film and France 2 Cinéma (Note: Owned by Constantin Film, with U.S. distribution rights currently licensed to Samuel Goldwyn Films)
September 24, 1986	Half Moon Street	theatrical distribution only; produced by RKO Pictures
October 10, 1986	Jumpin' Jack Flash	co-production with Silver Pictures
November 14, 1986	Streets of Gold	North American theatrical distribution only
December 25, 1986	The Morning After	North American, U.K. and Irish theatrical distribution only; produced by Lorimar Motion Pictures
December 31, 1986	Wisdom	North American theatrical and television distribution only, produced by Gladden Entertainment

== 1987 ==
Release date	Title	Notes
February 6, 1987	Black Widow	
February 13, 1987	Mannequin	North American theatrical and television distribution only; produced by Gladden Entertainment
March 6, 1987	Raising Arizona	distribution only; produced by Circle Films
April 17, 1987	Project X	
June 12, 1987	Predator	co-production with Silver Pictures and Davis Entertainment
July 10, 1987	Revenge of the Nerds II: Nerds in Paradise	co-production with Interscope Communications
September 18, 1987	The Pick-up Artist	
September 25, 1987	The Princess Bride	North American theatrical and television distribution only; produced by Act III Communications and Nelson Entertainment; Inducted into the National Film Registry in 2016.
October 2, 1987	Big Shots	North American theatrical distribution only; produced by Lorimar Motion Pictures
October 23, 1987	The Sicilian	North American theatrical and television and U.K. distribution only; produced by Gladden Entertainment
November 6, 1987	Less than Zero	
December 11, 1987	Wall Street	
December 16, 1987	Broadcast News	Nominated for the Academy Award for Best Picture; Nominated for the Golden Globe Award for Best Motion Picture – Musical or Comedy; Inducted into the National Film Registry in 2018 co-production with Gracie Films

== 1988 ==
Release date	Title	Notes
February 12, 1988	Satisfaction	co-production with NBC Productions
February 26, 1988	A Night in the Life of Jimmy Reardon	North American theatrical and home media distribution only, co-production with Island Pictures (Note: Owned by Universal Pictures)
March 11, 1988	Off Limits	
April 8, 1988	Bad Dreams	
June 3, 1988	Big	Nominated for the Golden Globe Award for Best Motion Picture – Musical or Comedy co-production with Gracie Films
July 6, 1988	License to Drive	
July 15, 1988	Die Hard	co-production with Silver Pictures and Gordon Company; Inducted into the National Film Registry in 2017
August 12, 1988	Young Guns	North American theatrical distribution only; produced by Morgan Creek Entertainment (Note: Owned by Morgan Creek Entertainment)
September 23, 1988	Dead Ringers	U.S. theatrical distribution only; produced by Morgan Creek Entertainment (Note: Co-owned by Morgan Creek Entertainment and ITV Studios)
October 7, 1988	Alien Nation	
November 23, 1988	Cocoon: The Return	
December 21, 1988	Working Girl	Nominated for the Academy Award for Best Picture; Winner of the Golden Globe Award for Best Motion Picture – Musical or Comedy
December 21, 1988	Talk Radio	U.K. and Irish distribution only; produced by Cineplex Odeon Films; distributed in the United States by Universal Pictures

== 1989 ==
Release date	Title	Notes
January 13, 1989	Gleaming the Cube	North American theatrical and television distribution only, produced by Gladden Entertainment (Note: Co-owned by MGM and ITV Studios)
February 10, 1989	The Fly II	co-production with Brooksfilms
March 10, 1989	Skin Deep	U.S. and select international distribution only; produced by Morgan Creek Entertainment (Note: Owned by Morgan Creek Entertainment, with international rights licensed to Revolution Studios; home media, television and streaming rights are sub-licensed to Sony Pictures, with select distribution rights also sub-licensed to Relativity Media)
April 14, 1989	Say Anything...	co-production with Gracie Films
May 19, 1989	How I Got into College	
July 5, 1989	Weekend at Bernie's	North American theatrical and television and French distribution only; produced by Gladden Entertainment
August 9, 1989	The Favorite	U.S. theatrical distribution only
August 9, 1989	The Abyss	
August 25, 1989	Millennium	North American theatrical and television distribution only; produced by Gladden Entertainment
October 13, 1989	The Fabulous Baker Boys	North American theatrical and television distribution only; produced by Gladden Entertainment
October 20, 1989	When the Whales Came	
October 27, 1989	Worth Winning	co-production with A&M Films
December 8, 1989	The War of the Roses	Nominated for the Golden Globe Award for Best Motion Picture – Musical or Comedy co-production with Gracie Films and Regency International Pictures (Uncredited)
December 13, 1989	Enemies, A Love Story	U.S. and select international distribution only; produced by Morgan Creek Entertainment
