= Seth Brundle =

Fictional character from The Fly

- The Fly character
- Jeff Goldblum as Dr. Seth Brundle
- First appearance: The Fly
- Last appearance: The Fly II (in archival videotape footage)
- Created by: David Cronenberg
- Portrayed by: Jeff Goldblum

In-universe information
- Nickname: Brundlefly
- Species: Human (pre-teleportation); Human/Insect Hybrid (post-teleportation)
- Occupation: Condensed Matter/Quantum Information physicist
- Relatives: Martin Brundle (son)

Sethaniel Brundle, also known as Brundlefly, is a fictional character and the tragic hero in David Cronenberg's 1986 remake of The Fly. He is played by Jeff Goldblum. Brundle was the third of Goldblum's "nerdy scientist" roles and is one of his most famous roles to date.

The character of Brundle was played by Daniel Okulitch in Howard Shore's 2008 opera The Fly in its premiere at the Théâtre du Châtelet in Paris.

== Fictional biography ==
=== Invention of the telepods ===
Seth Brundle mastered molecular physics at the age of 20, and devoted his life to developing a teleportation system, due to his severe motion sickness, to allow himself to travel places without getting sick.

Brundle attended a convention hosted by Anton Bartok (who would eventually become the main antagonist in the sequel), where he met Particle Magazine journalist, Veronica Quaife. Brundle convinced Veronica to allow him to demonstrate his newly created "telepods" to her, gaining her intrigue when he stated that it would "change the world". Brundle was able to convince Veronica not to send her story on him to her boss and ex-boyfriend, Stathis Borans, as he wasn't ready for the world to hear about it yet, in exchange for allowing Veronica to help on his projects.

After the two share an intimate encounter, Brundle has an epiphany that the telepods were reinterpreting flesh instead of reproducing it, leading him to reprogram the system to allow the successful teleportation of a baboon. When Veronica abruptly leaves to confront Stathis after learning he was planning to unveil Brundle's telepods prematurely, Brundle interprets the act as Veronica still being in love with Stathis.

Drunken and depressed, Brundle recklessly performs the telepod's human testing on himself to deprive Veronica of witnessing his success. But, unknown to him, a housefly enters the telepod at the same time as him, leading to the computer merging the two together at the molecular-genetic level. The resulting fusion emerges from the receiving pod, though no noticeable mutations are visible.

Brundle sees the test as a success and reconciles with Veronica. When Brundle awakens in the morning, he finds that his reflexes and senses have enhanced significantly, including his sexual stamina. Brundle theorises that the telepods had somehow purified and improved his physicality. However, Veronica grows concerned over strange behaviors from Seth: his face becomes sore-ridden, he develops an addiction to sugar, he becomes easily angered, and coarse and unusual hairs begin growing out of his back.

When Brundle attempts to persuade Veronica to use the telepods, she refuses and Brundle opts to storm off and abandon her. To find a willing test subject, Brundle goes to a bar and enters an arm-wrestling competition with a man in exchange for his girlfriend, Tawny. Brundle uses his newfound superhuman strength to snap the man's arm and spends the rest of the night engaging in sexual escapades with Tawny. The next morning, Brundle attempts to force Tawny to use the telepods, only for Veronica to intervene and Brundle to kick both Tawny and Veronica out of the laboratory. Brundle then enters his bathroom, and stares at his reflection as he realizes his decaying facial features. When he starts chewing his fingernails, a habit when he is stressed, he finds they are beginning to fall off.

=== Degeneration ===
The degeneration stages of Seth Brundle into Brundlefly designed by Chris Walas

After this discovery, Brundle rushes to the computer and discovers his molecular-genetic fusion with the housefly. Horrified, Brundle shuts himself off from the rest of the world, including Veronica. Weeks later, Brundle calls Veronica to reconcile, and confides his decaying state with her.

Brundle begins showing fly-like characteristics such as vomiting a corrosive enzyme on his food to be able to digest it and an addiction to sugary foods. In addition, parts of his body such as his hair and ears slowly begin falling off. Brundle becomes increasingly overwhelmed by the shock and horror of his mutation and begins finding the humour of his degeneration, including his ability to stick to walls, while still searching for a cure for his condition all the same, eventually sending Ronnie away out of fear that his fly instincts will cause him to hurt her.

Alone, and becoming more and more mentally deranged, Brundle concludes that the only way to become human again is to use the telepods to merge with another human. When he overhears a conversation between Veronica and Stathis that Veronica is pregnant with his child and plans to abort it, he breaks into the clinic Veronica has gone to for the procedure and abducts her before she can have it performed. Brundle begs Veronica to keep the child as it is "all that's left of him", while Veronica confesses her fears that the child might be a hybrid as well. Brundle takes Veronica back to his warehouse and witnesses Stathis enter the facility with a shotgun. Brundle attacks Stathis and dissolves his left hand and right leg with his corrosive enzymes, with only Veronica’s pleas keeping him from murdering Stathis outright.

=== Death ===
Brundle decides to use the original two telepods to merge himself, Veronica and their unborn child together in a third telepod. Veronica resists him, and accidentally removes Brundle's jaw in the scuffle, prompting Brundle to shed his rotting flesh and fully transform into a gruesome, mute human-housefly hybrid that had been growing underneath his human skin. He traps Veronica inside Telepod 1 and steps inside Telepod 2 to initiate the merge.

However, Stathis, still conscious, severs the cables to Telepod 1 with a shotgun to allow Veronica to escape safely. Brundlefly attempts to break out of the second telepod, but before he can exit, he is fused with its broken pieces. Now a crippled, physically ruined monstrosity, he holds the barrels of the shotgun, which Veronica has picked up, to his head, pleading for her to put him out of his misery. Devastated, Veronica hesitates at first and then complies, killing him.

=== Aftermath ===
Months after Brundle's death, Veronica dies while giving birth to their child, Martin. Martin continued his father's work and was often shown videotapes of Seth's work. Martin would eventually transform into a new version of Brundlefly, but was successfully able to cure his condition.

== Production ==
Before Goldblum was cast, many actors were considered for the role of Seth Brundle, including Richard Dreyfuss, John Malkovich, Mel Gibson and Michael Keaton. John Lithgow was offered the role, but turned it down stating it was "too grotesque". Producer Mel Brooks had suggested Pierce Brosnan but was rejected by Cronenberg.

Goldblum was against the original ending of the film where Veronica and Stathis end up back together. Goldblum believed that the ending would undermine the tragedy of the story. Even though some filmmakers insisted on keeping the ending, it was changed to the more tragic and abrupt ending in the movie.

== Legacy ==
Seth Brundle has become an iconic part of popular culture, referenced in many television shows and songs, as well as being recognised as one of Jeff Goldblum's best and most notable roles. Goldblum has cited Brundle as one of his favourites of the characters he has portrayed, and despite the character's apparent death at the end of the first movie, Goldblum has expressed interest in returning to the role. The character has also been heavily referenced in the animated television show Rick and Morty through human mutants called "Cronenbergs". Brundlefly is briefly referenced in the video game Tomb Raider III. Lara Croft, the protagonist of the game, tries to convince Doctor Willard to cease his experiments, as one of his men became a deadly mutant, with Lara mentioning the mutant's appearance to Brundlefly. Brundle was parodied on Saturday Night Live by Jim Carrey as 2020 presidential candidate Joe Biden in a reference to the fly that had landed on Vice President Mike Pence's head during the 2020 Vice-Presidential Debate. Fans have begun petitioning for Goldblum to reprise his role as Brundle for the program as the fly in the skit.

Goldblum was nominated for several awards for his role as Brundle, including winning the Saturn Award for Best Actor in 1986. His other "nerdy scientist" roles were The Adventures of Buckaroo Banzai Across the 8th Dimension, The Race for the Double Helix, Jurassic Park, Independence Day, The Lost World: Jurassic Park. Jurassic World: Fallen Kingdom and Jurassic World Dominion.

Award	Subject	Nominee	Result
Saturn Award	Best Actor	Jeff Goldblum	Won
National Society of Film Critics	Best Actor	Jeff Goldblum	Nominated
New York Film Critics Circle	Best Actor	Jeff Goldblum	Nominated

== See also ==
- The Metamorphosis by Kafka

== Notes ==
- Seth Brundle, who suffered from motion sickness, was ironically named after race car driver Martin Brundle (which was also used as the name of his son in The Fly II).
- Brundle's diseased metamorphosis was broken up into six stages by Chris Walas, Inc.'s makeup and creature effects crew (seven, if one includes the Brundlefly/Telepod fusion seen at the end of The Fly), ranging from facial discoloration to full-body rubber suits to highly-articulated puppets.
