= List of Brooksfilms productions =

This is a list of films produced by Brooksfilms, the studio founded by filmmaker Mel Brooks.

== Productions ==
Year	Film	Director	Release date	Distributor	Gross	Genre	Rotten Tomatoes
1980	Fatso	Anne Bancroft	February 1, 1980	20th Century Fox	$7,653,061	Romantic comedy	40%
1980	Loose Shoes	Ira Miller	August 1, 1980	National American Films	N/A	Comedy	N/A
1980	The Elephant Man	David Lynch	October 10, 1980	Paramount Pictures	$26,010,864	Historical drama	91%
1981	History of the World, Part I	Mel Brooks	June 12, 1981	20th Century Fox	$31,672,907	Anthology comedy	62%
1982	My Favorite Year	Richard Benjamin	October 8, 1982	Metro–Goldwyn–Mayer	$20,123,620	Comedy	96%
1982	Frances	Graeme Clifford	December 3, 1982	Universal Pictures	$5,000,000	Biographical drama	65%
1983	To Be or Not to Be	Alan Johnson	December 16, 1983	20th Century Fox	$13,030,214	War comedy	61%
1985	The Doctor and the Devils	Freddie Francis	October 4, 1985	20th Century Fox	$147,070	Gothic horror	0%
1986	The Fly	David Cronenberg	August 15, 1986	20th Century Fox	$60,629,159	Science-fiction body horror	92%
1986	Solarbabies	Alan Johnson	November 26, 1986	Metro–Goldwyn–Mayer	$1,579,260	Science-fiction	0%
1987	84 Charing Cross Road	David Jones	February 13, 1987	Columbia Pictures	$1,083,486	Drama	87%
1987	Spaceballs	Mel Brooks	June 24, 1987	Metro–Goldwyn–Mayer	$38,119,483	Comic science fiction	58%
1989	The Fly II	Chris Walas	February 10, 1989	20th Century Fox	$38,903,179	Science-fiction body horror	27%
1991	Life Stinks	Mel Brooks	July 26, 1991	Metro–Goldwyn–Mayer; 20th Century Fox	$4,102,526	Comedy drama	18%
1992	The Vagrant	Chris Walas	May 15, 1992	Metro–Goldwyn–Mayer; 20th Century Fox	$5,900	Comedy horror	N/A
1993	Robin Hood: Men in Tights	Mel Brooks	July 28, 1993	20th Century Fox; Gaumont	$35,739,755	Musical adventure comedy	43%
1995	Dracula: Dead and Loving It	Mel Brooks	December 22, 1995	Columbia Pictures; Gaumont; Castle Rock Entertainment	$10,772,144	Satirical comedy horror	11%
2005	The Producers	Susan Stroman	December 16, 2005	Universal Pictures; Columbia Pictures; Sony Pictures Releasing International	$38,058,335	Musical comedy	50%
2022	Paws of Fury: The Legend of Hank	Rob Minkoff; Mark Koetsier	July 15, 2022	Paramount Pictures; Nickelodeon Movies; Huayi Brothers; Flying Tigers Entertainment; Align	$42,426,743	Animated action comedy	54%
2027	Spaceballs: The New One	Josh Greenbaum	April 23, 2027	Amazon MGM Studios; Metro–Goldwyn–Mayer; Imagine Entertainment	TBA	Space opera parody	TBA

== Accolades ==
=== Awards and nominations ===
Award	Year	Film	Category	Nominee(s)	Result
Academy Awards	1981	The Elephant Man	Best Picture	Jonathan Sanger	Nominated
Academy Awards	1981	The Elephant Man	Best Director	David Lynch	Nominated
Academy Awards	1981	The Elephant Man	Best Actor	John Hurt	Nominated
Academy Awards	1981	The Elephant Man	Best Adapted Screenplay	David Lynch, Christopher De Vore and Eric Bergren	Nominated
Academy Awards	1981	The Elephant Man	Best Art Direction	Stuart Craig, Robert Cartwright & Hugh Scaife	Nominated
Academy Awards	1981	The Elephant Man	Best Costume Design	Patricia Norris	Nominated
Academy Awards	1981	The Elephant Man	Best Film Editing	Anne V. Coates	Nominated
Academy Awards	1981	The Elephant Man	Best Original Score	John Morris	Nominated
Academy Awards	1983	Frances	Best Actress	Jessica Lange	Nominated
Academy Awards	1983	Frances	Best Supporting Actress	Kim Stanley	Nominated
Academy Awards	1987	The Fly	Best Makeup	Chris Walas and Stephan Dupuis	Won
