= The Vagrant (1992 film) =

- VHS cover
- Directed by: Chris Walas
- Written by: Richard Jefferies
- Produced by: Gillian Richardson; Mel Brooks
- Starring: Bill Paxton; Michael Ironside; Marshall Bell
- Cinematography: John J. Connor; Jack Wallner
- Edited by: Jay Ignaszewski
- Music by: Christopher Young
- Production companies: Le Studio Canal+ Brooksfilms Ltd.
- Distributed by: Metro-Goldwyn-Mayer (United States); 20th Century Fox (International)
- Release date: May 15, 1992
- Running time: 91 minutes
- Country: United States
- Language: English
- Box office: $5,900

The Vagrant is a 1992 comedy horror film directed by Chris Walas and executive produced by Mel Brooks, through his Brooksfilms production company. The film stars Bill Paxton as Graham Krakowski, a financial clerk who is being driven insane by a homeless man (Marshall Bell) after moving into a new home across the street from where the homeless man had been squatting.

== Plot ==
Graham Krakowski is a middle class financial clerk who becomes paranoid that he is being stalked by a homeless man who camps across the street from his house. Ultimately he has the homeless man arrested for public urination. However, the homeless man is soon released from jail and appears to be ruining Krakowski's life. As Krakowski begins to sleepwalk and have vivid nightmares, he doubts his own sanity. When two murders occur, Krakowski suspects that he himself may be responsible.

After being arrested and put on trial for the murder of his real estate agent, whose body parts are found in Krakowski's refrigerator, the jury finds him not guilty but only after his mother dies of a heart attack while making an impassioned plea testifying in his defense, and her death wins the jury's sympathy. Krakowski finds himself drifting from state to state, and takes a job as the manager of a trailer park, where he is blamed for the killing of the owner's seeing eye dog.

Escaping from the trailer park, Krakowski discovers that not only is the homeless man really behind the killings, but the vagrant is a crazed former psychiatrist who had been trying to drive Krakowski crazy as part of a psychological experiment. Krakowski is discovered trying to choke the vagrant by a police officer who had been chasing after Krakowski but when the vagrant kills the officer, he photographs the killing as evidence, and the detective's partner shoots the vagrant, who falls into a pit of spikes. Krakowski is paid a reward from several states where the vagrant had been wanted for murder, but when he moves into a new house with his new finances, it is implied that he may actually be insane, and that the film's events may start over.

== Cast ==
Actor / Actress	Character
Bill Paxton	Graham Krakowski
Michael Ironside	Lt. Ralf Barfuss
Marshall Bell	The Vagrant
Colleen Camp	Judy Dansig
Marc McClure	Chuck
Stuart Pankin	Mr. Feemster
Patrika Darbo	Doattie
Ken Love	Buzz
Mitzi Kapture	Edie Roberts
Derek Mark Lochran	Det. Lackson
Teddy Wilson	X-Rays
Mildred Brion	Mrs. Howler
Allan Berne	Mr. Polkowisz
Katherine Gosney	Mrs. Krakowski
Nick Young	Guard
Lance Brady	Sheriff

== Production ==
Richard Jefferies wrote the script about a decade before the film's eventual production, but shelved the idea in favor of other projects. At one point, William Wesley showed interest in the script, which led to Jefferies and Wesley collaborating on the 1988 film Scarecrows. After unearthing the script and performing some minor rewrites, Chris Walas joined the project as director and brought the script to Mel Brooks, whose production company Brooksfilms had produced Walas's directorial debut, The Fly II.

The film was shot on location in Phoenix, Arizona.

== Release ==
The film grossed USD $4,300 on opening weekend, and made a total of $5,900 at the box office, with its widest theatrical distribution being screened in 8 theaters; the film was only in release for one week.

== Reception ==
=== Critical reception ===
The film was panned by Chicago Tribune writer Johanna Steinmetz, who wrote that "[The Vagrant is] not remotely funny, but it does work on a couple of levels that could make it something of a cult film for the disaffected, particularly if the disaffected have had too much to drink." Entertainment Weekly writer Doug Brod also panned the film, giving it a D+ rating, and saying that The Vagrant "plays like an attenuated, not to mention rejected, Tales from the Darkside episode" and called it a "moronic, ineptly directed bummer."

== Home media ==
The film was released on Blu-ray by Shout! Factory on May 23, 2017, and by Arrow Video in 2023.
