= The Coolangatta Gold (film) =

- Directed by: Igor Auzins
- Written by: Peter Schreck
- Story by: Ted Robinson; Peter Schreck
- Based on: developed from an idea by Max Oldfield
- Produced by: John Weiley
- Starring: Joss McWilliam; Colin Friels; Nick Tate; Josephine Smulders; Robyn Nevin
- Cinematography: Keith Wagstaff
- Edited by: Tim Wellburn
- Music by: Bill Conti
- Production company: Hoyts Edgley
- Distributed by: Hoyts Distribution
- Release date: 1984
- Running time: 112 minutes
- Country: Australia
- Language: English
- Budget: A$5.6 million
- Box office: A$1,365,000

The Coolangatta Gold is a 1984 Australian film directed by Igor Auzins and written by Peter Schreck and Ted Robinson. It led to the establishment of the iron man race The Coolangatta Gold in Coolangatta, on the Gold Coast, Queensland.

== Plot ==
Joe Lucas is determined that his son Adam will become a champion iron man. He neglects his younger son, Steve, who is an aspiring band manager and enjoys karate, as well as being his brother's training partner.

The leading iron man event is The Coolangatta Gold, an arduous competition for $20,000 prize money. The favorite for this event is champion iron man Grant Kenny. Kenny's father beat Joe Lucas for the iron man title in 1960.

Steve falls in love with a ballet dancer, Kerri, who inspires him to compete with his brother in The Coolangatta Gold.

== Cast ==
- Joss McWilliam as Steve Lucas
- Nick Tate as Joe Lucas
- Colin Friels as Adam Lucas
- Josephine Smulders as Kerri Dean
- Robyn Nevin as Roslyn Lucas
- Grant Kenny as himself
- Paul Starling as Karate Master
- Melanie Day as Gilda
- Melissa Jaffer as Ballet Teacher
- Wilbur Wilde as Lead Singer
- Kate Mailman as Child on beach

== Production ==
Writer Peter Schreck and director Igor Auzins had worked together successfully on the 1982 film We of the Never Never and decided to collaborate on another project. They wanted to do a contemporary love story in the sporting genre, and originally thought of doing a $1.5 million film shot in Bondi. However, after a few days it became obvious they wanted to do something more ambitious. Auzins and Schreck formed a company, Angoloro Productions, with John Weiley as a third partner in December 1982. They then approached Hoyts Edgley, which agreed within 24 hours to finance the film.

Filmmaker David Parker, who went on to make Malcolm (1986), was stills photographer on the film.

=== Soundtrack ===
The music recording of The Coolangatta Gold: Original Soundtrack Recording was produced by Ashley Irwin and edited for the soundtrack album by Philip Powers.

== Reception ==
The film performed disappointingly at the box office. Jonathan Chissick, managing director of Hoyts, said "I thought it was the best script to come out of Australia. So, we failed there somewhere. I don't want to point my finger but there was obviously a failure."

The Coolangatta Gold was parodied by the Australian comedy troupe The D-Generation in the 1993 season of The Late Show. The sketch "The Last Aussie Auteur: A Tribute to Filmmaker Warren Perso" features excerpts from various (fictional) Australian films, one being a box-office flop titled The Bermagui Bronze.

A 2024 article in InReview argued the film was "much better than its reputation suggests... It looks sumptuous – the big screen photography, lush colours, Leni Riefenstahl-esque depiction of athleticism – and is superbly edited. Friels is excellent... Most of all, the primeval heart of the film never loses its power – the ache of a son who hates his father but also wants his respect, the uncertainty of the favoured son, the damage of toxic masculinity."

== Impact ==
The film led to the establishment of the iron man race The Coolangatta Gold.

== Home media ==
The Coolangatta Gold was released on DVD by Umbrella Entertainment in November 2012. The DVD is compatible with all region codes and includes special features such as a photo gallery, the making of The Coolangatta Gold and a Good Morning Australia segment.

The music recording of The Coolangatta Gold: Original Soundtrack Recording was produced by Ashley Irwin and edited for the soundtrack album by Philip Powers.
