= 41st British Academy Film Awards =

1988 film awards ceremony

- Date: 20 March 1988
- Site: Grosvenor House Hotel
- Hosted by: Michael Aspel

Highlights
- Best Film: Jean de Florette
- Best Actor: Sean Connery; The Name of the Rose
- Best Actress: Anne Bancroft; 84 Charing Cross Road
- Most awards: Jean de Florette (4)
- Most nominations: Hope and Glory (13)

The 41st British Academy Film Awards, more commonly known as the BAFTAs, took place on 20 March 1988 at the Grosvenor House Hotel in London, honouring the best national and foreign films of 1987. Presented by the British Academy of Film and Television Arts, accolades were handed out for the best feature-length film and documentaries of any nationality that were screened at British cinemas in 1987.

Claude Berri's Jean de Florette won the award for Best Film. Sean Connery and Anne Bancroft took home Best Actor and Actress, whilst Daniel Auteuil and Susan Wooldridge won in the supporting categories.

The ceremony was hosted by Michael Aspel.

== Winners and nominees ==
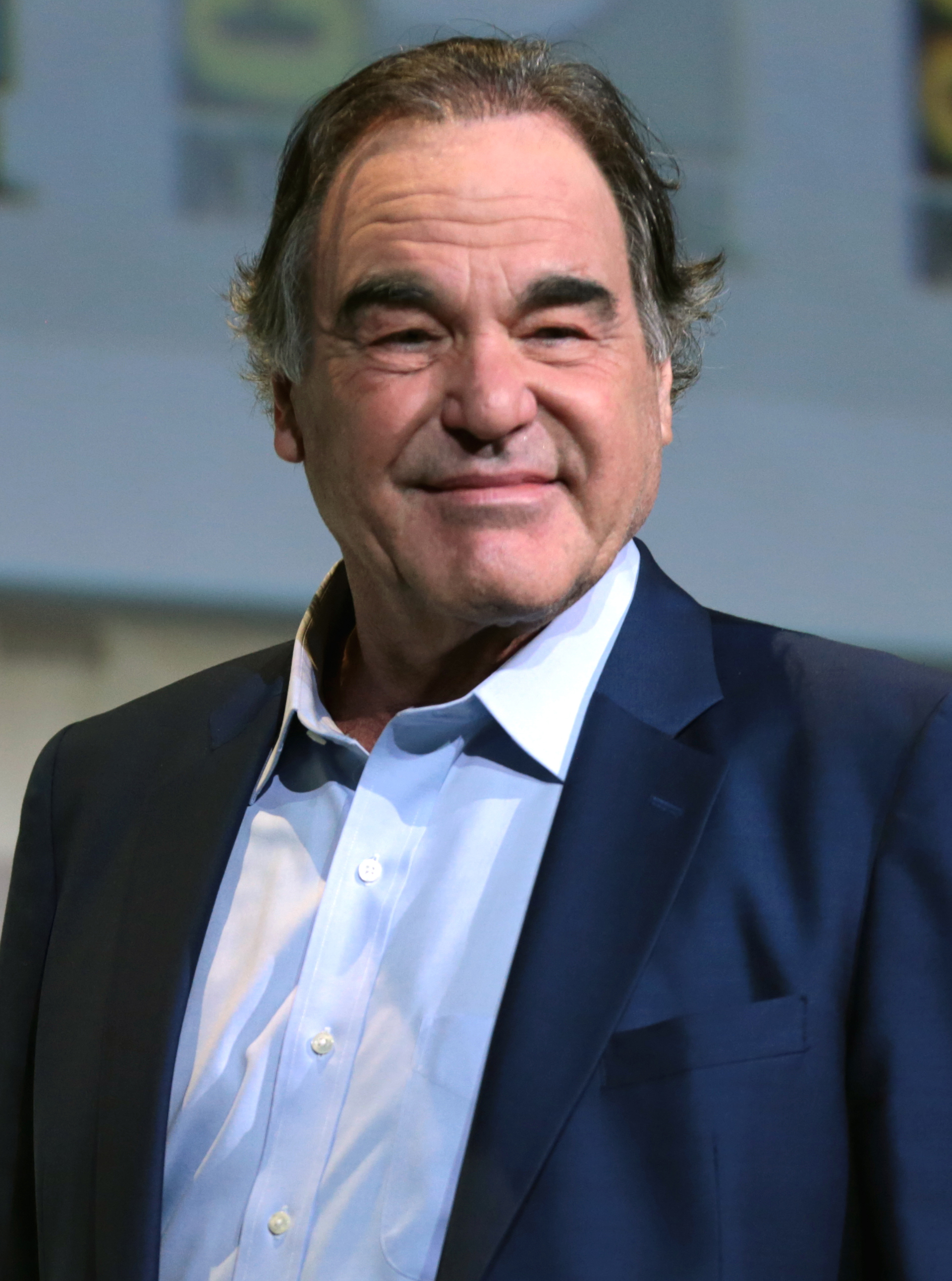
Oliver Stone, Best Director winner

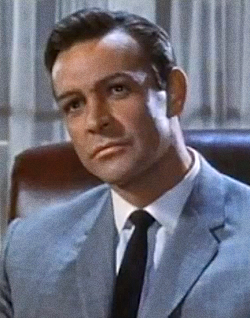
Sean Connery, Best Actor winner

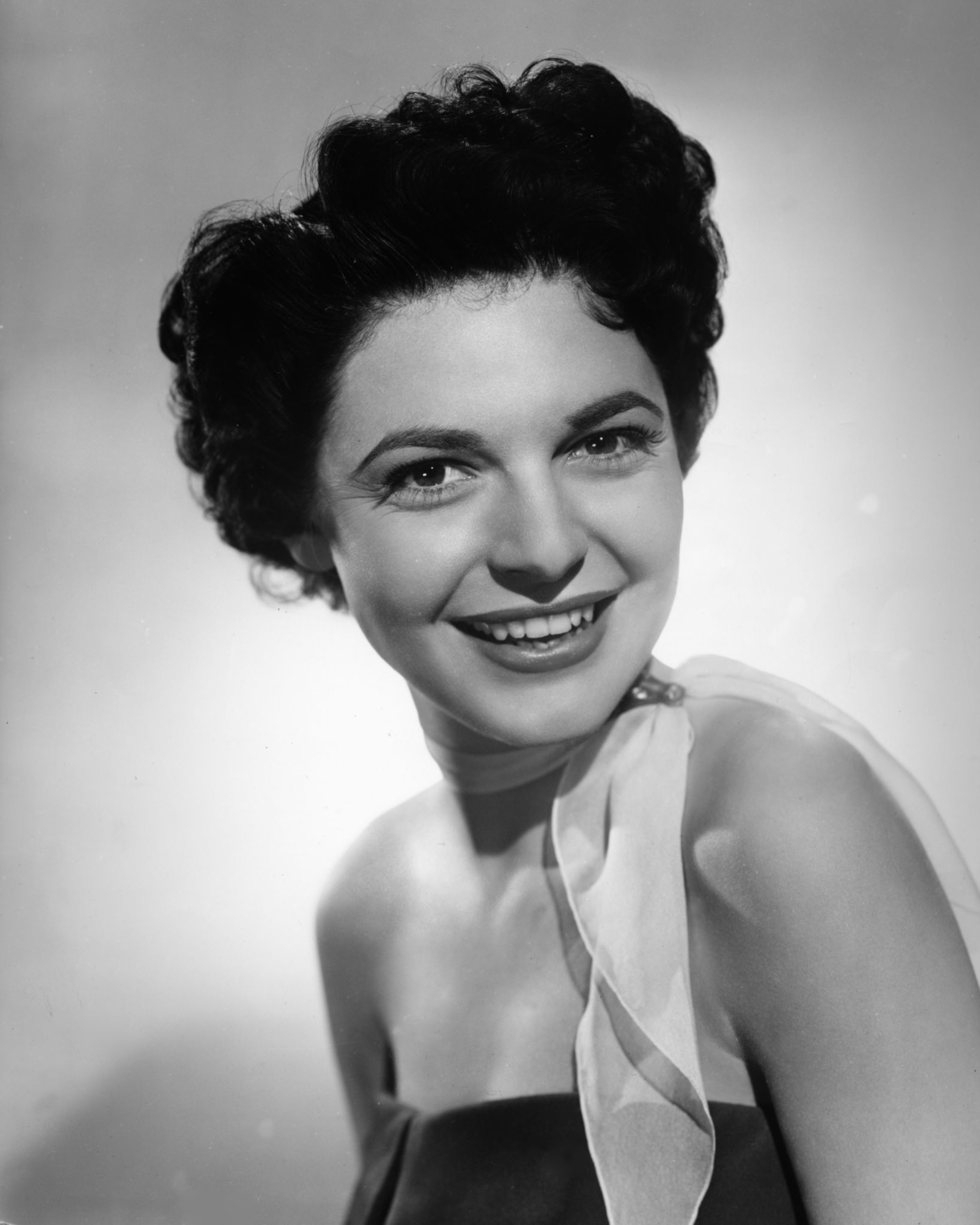
Anne Bancroft, Best Actress winner

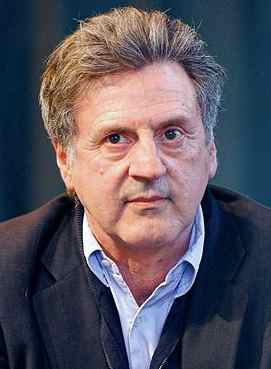
Daniel Auteuil, Best Supporting Actor winner

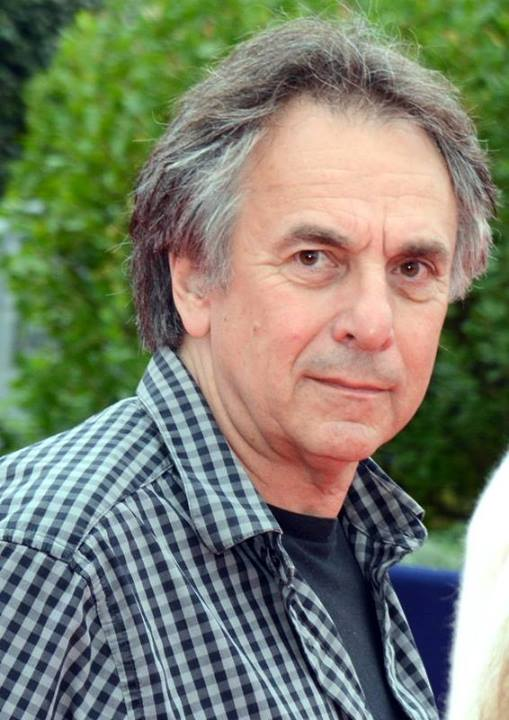
Bruno Nuytten, Best Cinematography winner

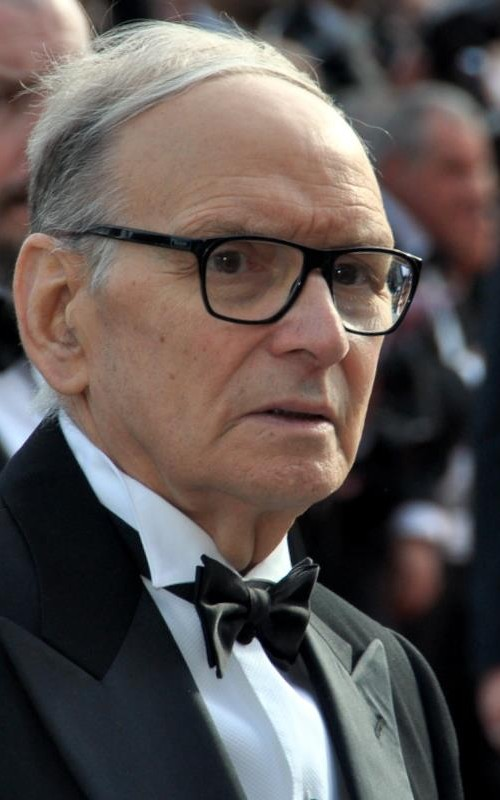
Ennio Morricone, Best Original Score winner

=== BAFTA Fellowship ===
- **Ingmar Bergman**

=== Outstanding British Contribution to Cinema ===
- **Monty Python**

=== Awards ===
Winners are listed first and highlighted in boldface.

**Best Film**: **Jean de Florette – Claude Berri**; Cry Freedom – Richard Attenborough; Hope and Glory – John Boorman; Radio Days – Robert Greenhut and Woody Allen	**Best Direction**: **Oliver Stone – Platoon**; Claude Berri – Jean de Florette; John Boorman – Hope and Glory; Richard Attenborough – Cry Freedom
**Best Actor in a Leading Role**: **Sean Connery – The Name of the Rose as William of Baskerville**; Gary Oldman – Prick Up Your Ears as Joe Orton; Gérard Depardieu – Jean de Florette as Jean Cadoret; Yves Montand – Jean de Florette as Cesar Soubeyran	**Best Actress in a Leading Role**: **Anne Bancroft – 84 Charing Cross Road as Helene Hanff**; Emily Lloyd – Wish You Were Here as Lynda Mansell; Julie Walters – Personal Services as Christine Painter; Sarah Miles – Hope and Glory as Grace Rowan
**Best Actor in a Supporting Role**: **Daniel Auteuil – Jean de Florette as Ugolin**; Ian Bannen – Hope and Glory as Grandfather George; John Thaw – Cry Freedom as Jimmy Kruger; Sean Connery – The Untouchables as Jimmy Malone	**Best Actress in a Supporting Role**: **Susan Wooldridge – Hope and Glory as Molly**; Dianne Wiest – Radio Days as Aunt Bea; Judi Dench – 84 Charing Cross Road as Nora Doel; Vanessa Redgrave – Prick Up Your Ears as Peggy Ramsay
**Best Original Screenplay**: **Wish You Were Here – David Leland**; Hope and Glory – John Boorman; Personal Services – David Leland; Radio Days – Woody Allen	**Best Adapted Screenplay**: **Jean de Florette – Claude Berri and Gérard Brach**; 84 Charing Cross Road – Hugh Whitemore; Little Dorrit – Christine Edzard; Prick Up Your Ears – Alan Bennett
**Best Cinematography**: **Jean de Florette – Bruno Nuytten**; Cry Freedom – Ronnie Taylor; Hope and Glory – Philippe Rousselot; Platoon – Robert Richardson	**Best Costume Design**: **Radio Days – Jeffrey Kurland**; Hope and Glory – Shirley Ann Russell; Little Dorrit – Sands Films; The Untouchables – Marilyn Vance
**Best Editing**: **Platoon – Claire Simpson**; Cry Freedom – Lesley Walker; Hope and Glory – Ian Crafford; Radio Days – Susan E. Morse	**Best Makeup and Hair**: **The Name of the Rose – Hasso Von Hugo**; The Fly – Chris Walas and Stephan Dupuis; Hope and Glory – Anna Dryhurst; Jean de Florette – Michele Dernelle and Jean-Pierre Eychenne
**Best Original Music**: **The Untouchables – Ennio Morricone**; Cry Freedom – George Fenton and Jonas Gwangwa; Hope and Glory – Peter Martin; Wish You Were Here – Stanley Myers	**Best Production Design**: **Radio Days – Santo Loquasto**; Hope and Glory – Anthony D. G. Pratt; Jean de Florette – Bernard Vezat; The Untouchables – William A. Elliott
**Best Sound**: **Cry Freedom – Jonathan Bates, Simon Kaye and Gerry Humphreys**; Full Metal Jacket – Nigel Galf, Edward Tise and Andy Nelson; Hope and Glory – Ron Davis, Peter Handford and John Hayward; Radio Days – Bob Hein, James Sabat and Lee Dichter	**Best Special Visual Effects**: **The Witches of Eastwick – Michael Lantieri, Michael Owens, Edward Jones and Bruce Walters**; The Fly – Chris Walas, Jon Berg, Louis Craig and Hoyt Yeatman; Full Metal Jacket – John Evans; Little Shop of Horrors – Bran Ferren, Martin Gutteridge, Lyle Conway and Richard Conway
**Best Documentary**: **Baka – People of the Rainforest – Phil Agland**; Forty Minutes: Home from the Hill – Molly Dineen; Fourteen Days in May – Paul Hamann; Man-Eating Tigers / Saving the Tiger – Naresh Bedi	**Best Film Not in the English Language**: **The Sacrifice – Anna-Lena Wibom and Andrei Tarkovsky**; Jean de Florette – Claude Berri; Manon des Sources – Claude Berri; My Life as a Dog – Waldemar Bergendahl and Lasse Hallström
**Best Short Animation**: **The Reluctant Dragon – Bridget Appleby**; Fireman Sam – Ian Frampton and John Walker; The Shoe People – Tony Barnes and Clennell Rawson; The Wind in the Willows – Brian Cosgrove and Mark Hall	**Best Short Film**: **Artisten – Jonas Grimås**; After Maria – Jean-Claude Robert; The Short and Curlies – Mike Leigh; Treacle – Peter Chelsom

== Statistics ==
Films that received multiple nominations
Nominations	Film
13	Hope and Glory
10	Jean de Florette
7	Cry Freedom
7	Radio Days
4	The Untouchables
3	84 Charing Cross Road
3	Platoon
3	Prick Up Your Ears
3	Wish You Were Here
2	The Fly
2	Full Metal Jacket
2	Little Dorrit
2	The Name of the Rose
2	Personal Services

Films that received multiple awards
Awards	Film
4	Jean de Florette
2	The Name of the Rose
2	Platoon
2	Radio Days

== See also ==
- 60th Academy Awards
- 13th César Awards
- 40th Directors Guild of America Awards
- 1st European Film Awards
- 45th Golden Globe Awards
- 8th Golden Raspberry Awards
- 2nd Goya Awards
- 3rd Independent Spirit Awards
- 14th Saturn Awards
- 40th Writers Guild of America Awards
