= Stephan Dupuis =

Canadian make-up artist

- Occupations: Make-up artist and special effects artist
- Years active: 1979–2022

Stephan Dupuis is a Canadian make-up artist who won at the 59th Academy Awards for Best Makeup for the film The Fly. The win was shared with Chris Walas.

== Selected filmography ==
- A Dangerous Method (2011)
- 300 (2007)
- I Am Legend (2007)
- A History of Violence (2005)
- Jason X (2002)
- The Man Without a Face (1993)
- Stalin (1992)
- Indiana Jones and the Last Crusade (1989)
- The Fly II (1989)
- Poltergeist III (1988)
- RoboCop (1987)
- The Fly (1986)
- Amityville II: The Possession (1982)
- Quest for Fire (1981)
- Scanners (1981)
- City on Fire (1979)
