= One Night Stand (1984 film) =

- Poster
- Directed by: John Duigan
- Written by: John Duigan
- Produced by: Richard Mason
- Starring: Tyler Coppin; Cassandra Delaney; Jay Hackett; Saskia Post; David Pledger
- Cinematography: Tom Cowan
- Edited by: John Scott
- Music by: William Motzing
- Production company: Hoyts Edgley
- Distributed by: Hoyts Distribution
- Release date: 5 May 1984
- Running time: 94 minutes
- Countries: Australia; Canada
- Language: English
- Budget: A$1.4 million
- Box office: A$111,978 (Australia)

One Night Stand is a 1984 science fiction film directed by John Duigan.

== Cast ==
- Tyler Coppin as Sam
- Cassandra Delaney as Sharon
- Jay Hackett as Brendan
- Saskia Post as Eva
- David Pledger as Tony
- Justin Monjo as American Sailor
- Ian Gilmour as Sharon's ex-boyfriend
- Paul Hester – U.S. officer (uncredited)

== Plot ==
Just before Christmas, Sydney Opera House usherette Sharon and her friend Eva meet best mates Brendan and Tony in the midst of an anti-war protest in front of two United States Navy ships. Despite being dressed as Santa Claus, the men chat up the women. Brendan attempts to impress Sharon by claiming to be a singer who has performed at the Opera House. The four go on a double date to see Midnight Oil and later the women kick the men out of their flat after overhearing them (falsely) claim to each other to have seduced their dates. There are news reports of growing tension between the United States and Soviet Union with fears that one mistake could lead to nuclear war.

On New Year's Eve, Sharon is working at the Opera House and after the performance, Eva meets her so they can go to a party. They find a U.S. Navy Sailor asleep in one of the theatres, who identifies himself as Sam. Having known for months that war was imminent, he deserted his ship and has been hiding in the Opera House. Sharon recognises him from a newspaper article which describes him as "missing". While the three talk in the control room of the theatre, Brendan comes onto the stage and attempts to sing, revealing that he works as a cleaner in the Opera House. While the women talk to Brendan, Sam overhears on the radio that war has broken out in Europe and tactical nuclear weapons have been used in Germany. There are further news reports that four military targets in Australia – North West Cape, Pine Gap, Nurrungar and Jervis Bay – have been hit by nuclear weapons.

Ordered to stay in the Opera House, the four try to figure out the best way they can survive the escalating conflict, initially hiding in the basement then going to a bar (for which Brendan has the key), getting drunk and playing strip poker, as well as dancing to the cinematic backdrop of Fritz Lang's Metropolis during one of its later scenes when an underground workers community faces an apocalyptic flood scenario of its own. Through a series of flashbacks and talking about their past, the four begin to bond. The following morning, Brendan and Sharon pair off and have sex in a storage room, and Eva finds a television and learns that the war in Europe has escalated to a full-scale nuclear exchange, with much of Europe and the United States devastated. The newscast then shows footage of horribly burned and disfigured victims of a nuclear blast near New York City. As the sky begins to turn red from firestorms around Sydney and air raid sirens go off, the four, upon hearing an emergency announcement on the radio, join thousands of others taking refuge in the underground Martin Place railway station. As Sharon and Eva sing "It Might as Well Rain Until September" to entertain the crowd, the lights go out and a loud explosion is heard above them. The frame freezes and it is uncertain whether Sydney has been hit by a nuclear weapon in its turn.

== Production ==
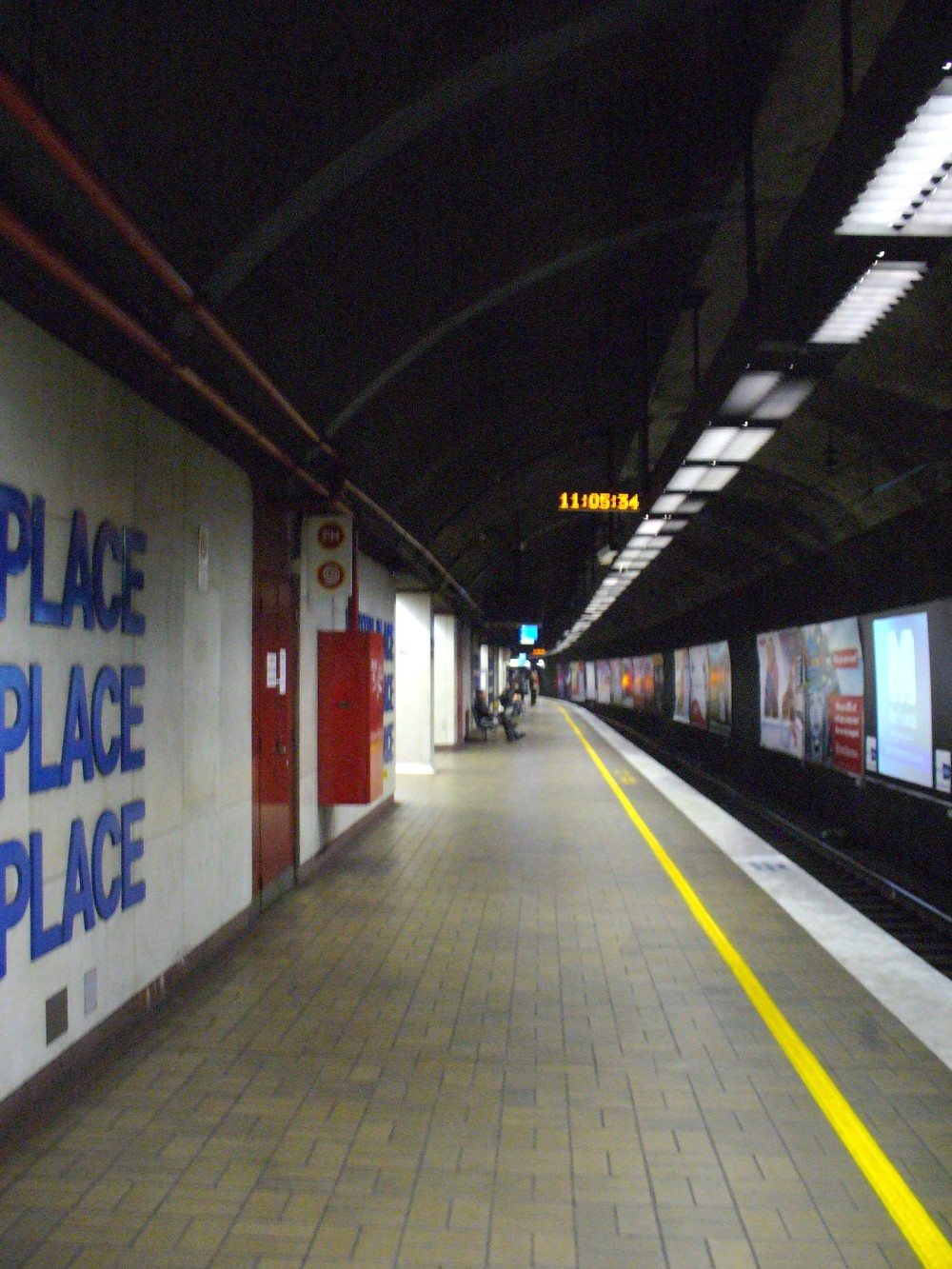
Platform at Martin Place railway station where the final scene was filmed.

Richard Mason and John Duigan brought the script to Hoyts Edgley who agreed to back it. Simon Wincer called Duigan "a highly talented filmmaker and a brilliant writer" who was "an utter joy to work with".

The Opera House was only used for ten days of filming because it was too expensive to hire. The rest of the movie was shot in the Seymour Centre.

The film includes a performance by Midnight Oil.

Paul Hester, drummer for Split Enz and Crowded House, appears in the film uncredited.

== Box office ==
One Night Stand grossed $111,978 at the box office in Australia, which is equivalent to $284,424 in 2009 dollars.
