= Paul Starling =

Australian karateka

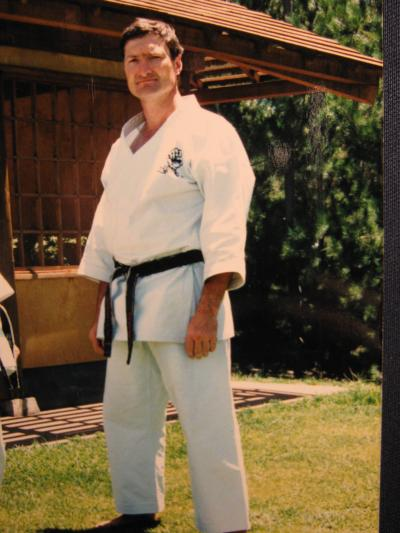
- Paul Starling at the Japanese Prisoner-of-War Memorial in Cowra, New South Wales
- Born: 1948 (age 77–78); Sydney, Australia
- Style: Karate
- Rank: 8th dan karate

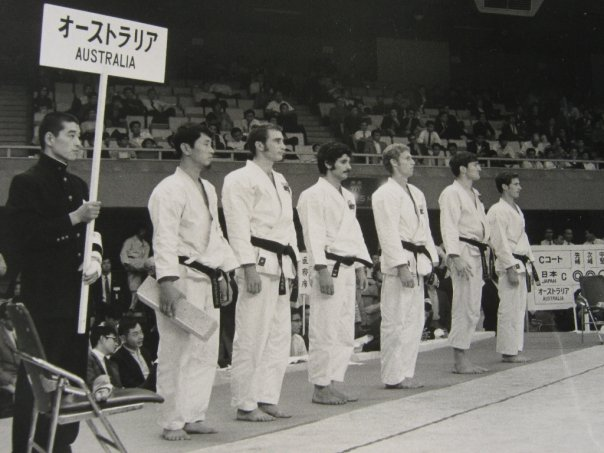
1970 Australian Karate World Championship Team.

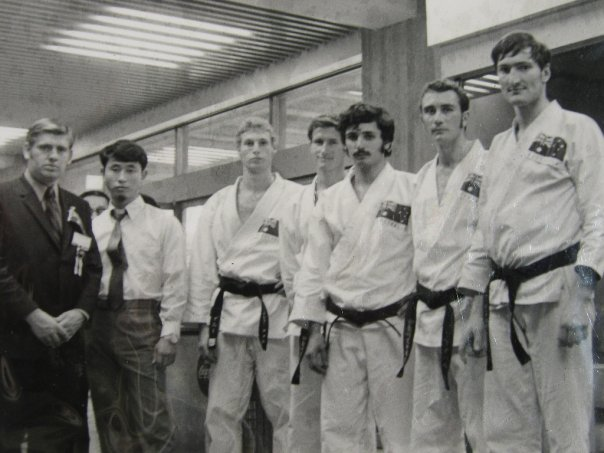
Starling at the 1970 Karate World Championships. : John Halpin, Paul Starling, Graham Kelleher, Danny Ellaby and Ilias Zacharias

Paul Noel Starling (born 1948) is an Australian martial artist renowned as a Gōjū-ryū Karate master. He was the most senior Caucasian student of Gōjū-ryū Gogen Yamaguchi, and is a world Vice President of the International Karate do Goju Kai Association (IKGA)

== Karate World Championships ==
He was also the first Australian karateka to compete in a Karate World Championships and remain undefeated when in 1970 at the first Karate World Championships his team came up against undisputed favorites Japan at the inaugural event held in Tokyo Japan. Paul Starling was also the first graduate (1973) of Gogen Yamaguchi's Japan Karate do College, and the only Caucasian and Australian to graduate as a Shihan (Master). He commenced training as a teenager in 1963 at the first Dojo (karate school) of Goju Kai established in Australia at that time, with the founder of Goju Kai in Australia; Merv Oakley Sensei. During this period in Australian Karate do history there were few qualified Instructors in the country, and of those only a handful were proficient or graded legitimately to Instructor level. Merv Oakley was a pioneer of Australian Karate, and was the first Australian to have traveled to the Nippori, Uneo and Asakusa Tokyo Dojo in Japan to study and train with Gogen Yamaguchi for extended periods of time.

== Daily training regime ==
Starling had commenced training on a daily basis in judo from adolescence with Australian teacher Ron Cox, and for a decade continued to train in judo and Goju Kai Karate do concurrently on a full-time daily basis.

After graduation from Barker College in Sydney with the Leaving Certificate, Paul was recruited by Unilever Australia who supported his world championship participation 1970- 1972 where he commenced a managerial trainee-ship whilst he simultaneously commenced duties with the Australian Army CMF, following in the footsteps of father: Lieutenant Colonel Noel George Reid Starling, who was arguably the longest serving Australian Army Officer, (46 years) enlisted 1927- 1973.

== Early years ==
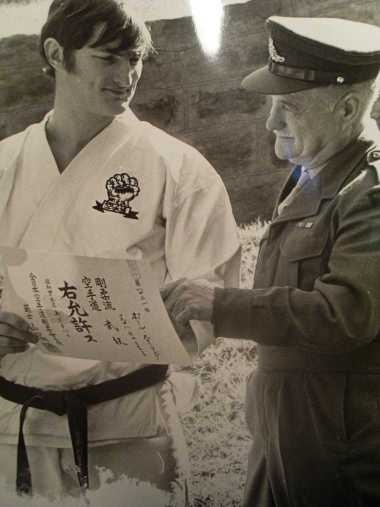
Starling with his father

It was as an Australian Army officer himself that Paul Starling developed his early leadership skills and the self-discipline that helped him build the reputation of Gōjū-ryū via the Sydney Goju Kai Dojo and the Macquarie University Karate Club, into successful traditional Japanese Dojo. As a founder and executive member of the Australian Karate Federation, for many years he was involved in a voluntary capacity for over two decades in promoting Karate do in Australia and as a referee, judge and coach at State, National and International W.K.F. competitions. Along with Australian politician and fellow karateka, the late John Newman, he promoted Australian Karate do in the media and helped to organise colleague Instructors in Australia in those fledgling days, into a cohesive group whereby Australia's reputation and success at International competition during the 1980s was unprecedented for a country with such a limited population.

As a member of the first Australian team to the Karate World Championships (World Karate do Championship), and the only member to remain undefeated, the Australian team of five, John Halpin; Paul Starling; Graham Kelleher; Danny Ellaby and Ilias Zacharias came up against world favorites in Japan. Photos to the right show the team members about to compete against the Japanese team at this historic event. Paul Starling remained undefeated against his opponent; the All Japan Champion Akihita Isaka. Japan were the eventual winners of the coveted World Championship Team event. Other members of the Japanese World Champion team included: Abe, Yahara, Osaka, and Tanaka.

== Contributions to karate ==
- Represented Australia at the Karate World Championships World Karate Federation's first Karate World Championships in Japan in 1970, and also at the 2nd Karate World Championships at Paris in 1972.
- A founder member of the Australian Karate Federation - A.K.F. the only recognised body by the Australian Government and the International Olympic Committee.
- Founder member -The Kokusai Karate do Shihan Kai.
- Founder member -The New South Wales Karate Federation.
- Chief Instructor - Macquarie University Karate Club. (1971–2004)
- Represented Australia as an international official at W.U.K.O (W.K.F.) Karate World Championships
- Karate Instructor of the Year (Blitz Magazine)
- Chancellor's Lifetime Achievement Award- Macquarie University
- First Shihan graduate of Gogen Yamaguchi's Japan Karate do College Nihon Karate do Senmon Gakko
- Only Caucasian and Australian Graduate as Shihan: Japan Karate do College

== Coolangatta Gold ==
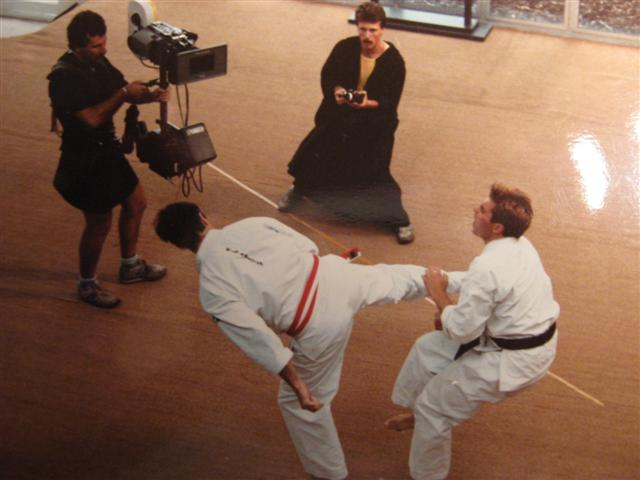
Starling shooting a scene in The Coolangatta Gold

Starling's role as the karate-do instructor in the 1983 Australian movie The Coolangatta Gold, also known as Lucas Lucas in Asia, and The Gold and the Glory in the United States. accompanied by several of his black belt students who played the part of the Karate class. Starling was approached by the film's producer, director and writer (Igor Auzons and Peter Schreck) in 1982 and asked to train a leading actor, Joss McWilliam, in karate methods full-time over a period of 3 months in order for the actor to fulfill his role in the film. McWilliam trained diligently as a beginner on a daily basis with Paul and the senior instructors of the Dojo. His character in the film was a black belt Shodan; however, in reality, McWilliam was actually a white Belt in Karate do. Starling was chosen from Australia's top karate-do athletes to portray the Karate Instructor in this classic Australian movie 'The Coolangatta Gold in 1983, by producer John Weiley; director Igor Auzins and writer Peter Schreck, whereby Starling was noted by the reviewers of respected American Variety (magazine) as having played a most commendable and convincing role.

== Training at the Japan Karate Do College ==
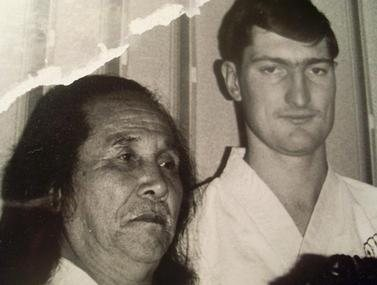
Gogen Yamaguchi with Paul Starling, Sydney, 1970.

Whilst in Japan and attending the prestigious Japan Karate do College, Starling had stayed with Gogen Yamaguchi in his home, and had also acted in a secretarial capacity for the I.K.G.A. (International Karate do Gojukai Association). In this role he had become closely aligned with the Yamaguchi family in Japan, and he has since returned on a dozen different occasions with large groups of his students to train with both Gogen Yamaguchi prior to his death in 1989, and also later with Goshi Yamaguchi, Gosen Yamaguchi, and also Wakako Yamaguchi.

Whilst at the Japan Karate do College (Nihon Karate do Senmon Gakko) where Starling trained full-time for one year in 1973, he was taught by Gogen Yamaguchi (Goju Kai), Hironori Otsuka (Wado Ryu), Iwata Manzao (Shito Ryu), Motokatsu Inoue (Ryukyu Kobujitsu Hozon Shinko Kai). Also trained by Goshi Yamaguchi and several other Japanese Shihan of the time.

When in Tokyo 3 years previously during 1970 whilst representing Australia in the Team kumite event at the inaugural Karate World Championships, Gogen Yamaguchi suggested the name of Sydney Goju Kan for Starling's own Dojo, and the School has been in operation ever since. Along with the Macquarie University Karate Club (established 1970) Sydney Goju Kai members of Paul Starling trained with, and competed against their Melbourne Goju Kai colleagues. It was in 1989 that Paul Starling became the Chief Instructor of Goju Kai Karate do Australia until retiring from that position 15 years later in 2004 due to a sudden illness.

== Accomplishments ==
- Former N.S.W State Coach for the New South Wales Karate Federation.
- State of New South Wales "A" Level Referee Australian Karate Federation.
- Former "A" Level National Australian Referee for the Australian Karate Federation.
- Former National Secretary for the AKF (FAKO).
- Represented Australia as a referee/judge various Karate World Championships World Karate Federation Championships including Taiwan 1982, where he coached his wife and student (Sandie) Alexandra Starling to become the first ever Australian Karate athlete to win a medal, when she won 3rd place: Bronze in the Karate World Championships Female Kata event performing Gōjū-ryū Kata Seisan, Seipai and Suparinpei.
- Formulator of inaugural Level One Coaching Course run by the A.K.F. for the National Coaching Accreditation Scheme.
- On the committee that designed the original Level Two Coaching Scheme for the A.K.F.
- National Australian University Sports Co-ordinator for Karate do.
- Organizing Committee: Karate World Championships W.K.F. World Karate do Championships Sydney 1986.

== Legacy ==
Many international, Australian national, and state karate champions have come from Starling's dojo. Many of his students have gone on to become internationally recognised instructors in their own right. Amongst his senior graduates who have gone on to become shihan are Ingo De Jong 8th dan hanshi (I.K.G.A. Vice President, Director of the European Bloc, Branch Chief for Scandinavia), Helmut Moldners 5th dan (former NSW North Coast Branch Chief), and Sandie Alexandra Starling 5th dan W.K.F World Karate do Championship Taiwan medalist in 1982.

== Current I.K.G.A. qualifications ==
Paul Starling was awarded KYOSHI License in 1989 by Gogen Yamaguchi and Goshi Yamaguchi, 7th Dan in 1995, and 8th Dan in 2014 in Tokyo Japan, and was also graded to 5th Dan in the Okinawan Weapons Ryukyu Kobujitsu Hozon Shinko Kai in 1988 by Motokatsu Inoue in Shimizu City, Shizuoka Prefecture, Japan.
