= Gōgen Yamaguchi =

Japanese karateka

- Historical photo of Gōgen Yamaguchi
- Born: January 20, 1909; Miyakonojō, Miyazaki, Japan
- Died: May 20, 1989 (aged 80)
- Style: Gōjū-ryū
- Teachers: Takeo Maruta, Jitsuei Yogi, Chōjun Miyagi
- Rank: 10th dan

Other information
- Notable students: Mas Oyama, Kenji Kurosaki, Paul Starling, Peter Urban

Jitsumi Gōgen Yamaguchi (山口剛玄; January 20, 1909 – May 20, 1989), also known as Gōgen Yamaguchi, was a Japanese martial artist and student of Gōjū-ryū Karate under Chōjun Miyagi. He was one of the most well-known karate-dō masters from Japan and he founded the International Karate-dō Gōjū Kai Association.

Prior to his death, Yamaguchi was decorated by the Emperor of Japan in 1968 with the Ranjū-Hōshō, らんじゅほうしょう(藍綬褒章), the Blue Ribbon Medal of the fifth order of merit, for his enormous contribution to the spread worldwide of the Japanese martial arts. For many years he was listed in the Guinness Book of Records regarding his rank and achievements. According to an obituary:

His name was a household word in Karate circles, and he appeared in all the major Martial Arts magazines and publications, both in Japan and the western world.

— Paul Starling, The End of an Era, Obituary Gogen Yamaguchi in Australasian Fighting Arts, Aug/Sept Issue 1989 pp.68-70

== Early years ==
According to his autobiographical work: Karate Gojū-ryū by the Cat Tokyo, Japan (1963), Gōgen Yamaguchi was born on January 20, 1909, in Miyakonojō Shonai, Miyazaki Prefecture, Japan, near Kagoshima City on the island of Kyūshū. In his 5th year of primary school Yamaguchi commenced his karate-dō training under the guidance of Takeo Maruta, a carpenter joiner from Okinawa. Maruta was a Gōjū-ryū practitioner.

Gōgen Yamaguchi was named Jitsumi Yamaguchi by his father Tokutarō who was a merchant and later a schoolteacher and superintendent; his mother was Yoshimatsu. Jitsumi was their 3rd son, and there were ten children in this very large Japanese family.

== "The Cat" ==
Gōgen Yamaguchi was also famously known in the world of karate-dō as 'the Cat'; he was a very small man, just over five feet (1.52 meters) and a mere 160 pounds (73 kg); however, he projected the impression of great bulk and an aura reminiscent of the samurai era. He was first dubbed 'the Cat' by American GIs for his gliding walk and flowing hair. He alone was primarily responsible for the spread of Gōjū-kai throughout the world today whereby hundreds of thousands of practitioners have experienced some form of training within traditional and non-traditional karate dojo.

According to Gōgen Yamaguchi himself when interviewed by French magazine Karate journalist Rolland Gaillac, April 1977 edition, he stated: "Even today, young man, if you were to face me in combat, I would be able to determine in a second the strength of your Ki. Immediately I would know if you were a good opponent. It is this quality, and no other, which has given me the name of The Cat."

== Early training in Kyoto ==
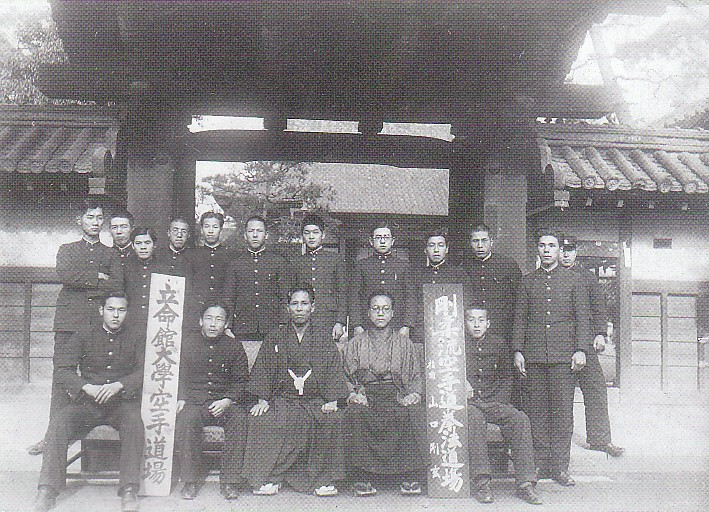
Yamaguchi and his students at Ritsumeikan University 1929. Yamaguchi is in the middle.

Gōgen then began the serious study of karate-dō with Sensei Takeo Maruta after his family relocated to Kyoto. Maruta was also a carpenter or joiner by trade and was himself a student of the legendary Chōjun Miyagi of Okinawa. Gōgen Yamaguchi studied directly with Chōjun Miyagi later in 1929, after he and his then-current teacher and friend Jitsuei Yogi wrote to Chōjun Miyagi and invited him to come to Japan.

== Gogen meets Chōjun Miyagi ==
Chōjun Miyagi visited the university dojo of Kansai, Osaka, Ritsumeikan, Kyoto, and Doshisha Universities, whilst Gōgen was attending Ritsumeikan University in Kyoto. There he studied Law and in 1930 Yogi together with Gōgen Yamaguchi co-founded the Ritsumeikan daigaku karate kenkyū-kai (立命館大学空手研究会; lit. Ritsumeikan University Karate Research Association), the first karate club at Ritsumeikan University. The Ritsumeikan Karate-dō Kenkyū-kai was the first university karate club in western Japan and was infamous for its hard style training and fierce karate fighters. Both Yogi and Yamaguchi attended Ritsumeikan University during the time Chōjun Miyagi visited, and Chōjun Miyagi stayed in Yogi's apartment.

Chōjun Miyagi later gave Gōgen Yamaguchi the responsibility for spreading Gōjū-ryū in mainland Japan. In the early 1930s, Gōgen designed what would become the legendary signature Gōjū-kai fist. It is said to be modeled after the right fist of Chōjun Miyagi.

== Introduces Jiyū Kumite and Forms the All Japan Karate-dō Gōjū-kai Federation ==
After graduating from Ritsumeikan University in Kyoto in 1934, that same year Gōgen designed and introduced Jiyū-kumite which has become known today as sport and tournament fighting kumite. In 1935 he officially formed the All Japan Karate-dō Gōjū-kai Association (which later split into the JKF Gojukai and the J.K.G.A.) Also in 1935 Gōgen began his travels with the Japanese government as an intelligence officer and his first son Norimi Gōsei Yamaguchi was born (Gōsei is the current leader of Gōjū-kai USA).

== World War II ==
During his military tour in Manchuria in World War II, Gōgen was captured by the Soviet military in 1942 and incarcerated as a prisoner of war in a Russian concentration camp. He was originally targeted for hard labour in the POW camp. However, he had impressed even the hard-nosed Russians. They discovered who he was and requested that he teach karate-dō to the Russian soldiers. It was then that, 'the prisoner became the master of the guards, who became his students'. He claimed that it was here that he battled and defeated a live tiger, after he was locked in a cell with the beast which his captors expected would devour him. This claim has created much controversy; however, Russian sources from the time would need to be located in order to verify this event.

In 1945, Gōgen returned to Japan, where he re-opened his initial karate-dō dojo (which was later destroyed by fire) in Nippori and advertised with a sign outside reading 'Gōjū-ryū-kai' Many people thought his school was closed forever and that he had been killed in the war; accordingly, Gōgen held large exhibitions in Tokyo, which showcased the various Chinese and Japanese martial arts that he had experienced. His school reopened and moved at a later date to the Suginami-ku area of Tokyo. Here he quickly expanded throughout a network of independent Gōjū-ryū dojo. The rapid growth and expansion was reinforced by Gōgen's energetic and forceful persona, which resulted in a worldwide network of karate schools, which he alone built into a powerful martial arts empire.

== Registers the name Gōjū-Kai, opens his Honbu Dojo ==
Gōgen Yamaguchi established the Gōjū-kai Headquarters in Suginami-ku, Tokyo, Japan, near the busy shopping precinct of Roppongi. By 1950, Gōjū-kai Headquarters was officially relocated to the Suginami Tokyo school, which contributed to an almost tripling of membership to 450,000, according to his autobiography. Five years later, he officially chartered the I.K.G.A. Later in 1964, Gōgen Yamaguchi along with other founder members Ōtsuka Hironori from Wadō-ryū; Nakayama Masatoshi from Shotokan; Mabuni Kenei and Iwata Manzao of Shitō-ryū, unified all the karate dojo in Japan to form the All Japan Karate-dō Federation, which is still in existence today as the Japan Karate Federation (JKF).

== Gōjū-Kai spreads throughout the western world ==
By 1966, his organization comprised more than 200 dojo and clubs and 60,000 members within the Gōjū-kai system.

His most notable students included Yamamoto Gonnohyoue and Yamaguchi Gosei. Another notable student was Mas Oyama who attained 8th Dan under Yamaguchi before starting his own style, Kyokushin.

In Australia, Paul Starling (the most senior Caucasian pupil graded by Gōgen Yamaguchi in his lifetime) and now 8th Dan Hanshi, had been training with Gōgen's first Australian student Mervyn Oakley who opened his Sydney Goju Kai School in 1963.

== Contributions to Budō ==
Gōgen Yamaguchi's contributions to Gōjū-ryū karate-dō and to karate-dō in general have been enormous. Under his leadership and guidance the International Karate-dō Gōjū-kai Association (I.K.G.A) has developed and thrived. The organization has increased in popularity both in Japan and other Asian and Western countries throughout the world. By 2008 there were approximately 60-70 countries teaching the Gōjū-kai karate-dō principles and training methods. Gōgen Yamaguchi succeeded in unifying all the karate schools in Japan into a single union which resulted in the formation of The Federation of All Japan Karate-dō Organization (F.A.J.K.O.) in 1964. The Kokusai Budō Renmei - (The International Martial Arts Federation) in Japan, whose chairman was Prince Higashikuni of the Japanese Imperial Family appointed Yamaguchi as a Shihan - master of that organisation's karate-dō division. Yamaguchi added to the Gōjū system the Taikyoku kata forms, - training methods for the beginner students to prepare them for the more advanced kata.

It has been argued that 'never before has a single man had such profound effect on the development and propagation of karate-dō'. (De Jong, Ingo, 1989). Goju-Kai Karate-do Hard and Soft in Harmony - Volume 1. Sweden, Jakobsbergs Tryckeri AB.

Gōgen Yamaguchi visited Sydney and Melbourne, Australia on two occasions, in 1970 and 1972.

== Family ==
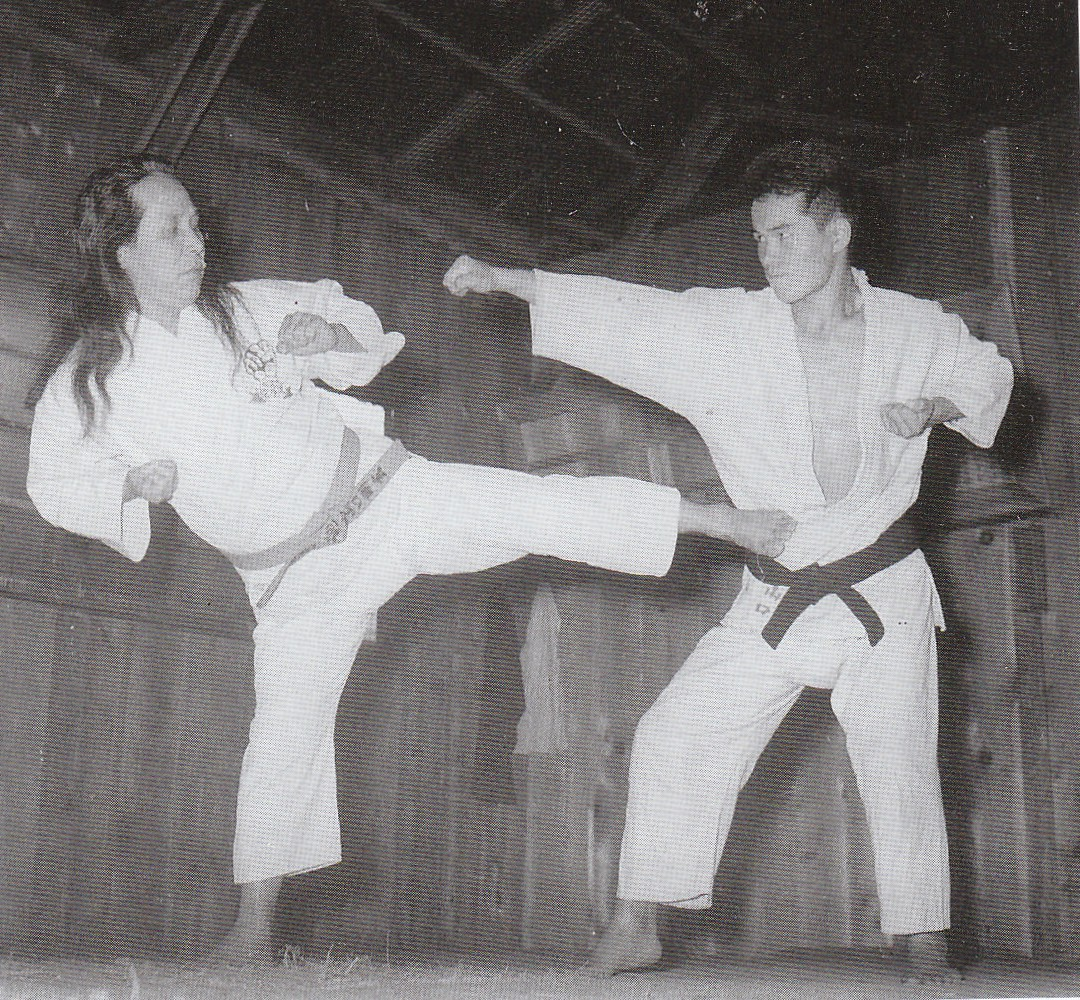
Kumite with his son, Gosen in 1949

Gōgen Yamaguchi Kaiso died on May 20, 1989. He had been married twice, firstly to Midori with whom he had four children: Gōsei Norimi Yamaguchi (b. 1935), Gōsen Kishio Yamaguchi (1940-1990), Makiko Yamaguchi, and Gōshi Hirofumi Yamaguchi (b. 1942). He and his second wife, Mitsue, had one child, Gōkyōko Wakako Yamaguchi. All of his children practiced karate-dō and became masters in their own right. The names commencing with gō (剛) were their karate names. Gōsei Norimi Yamaguchi has his own organisation in the United States and Gōshi Hirofumi Yamaguchi is the President of the International Karate-dō Gōjū-kai, with branches in 60 countries. Gōsen Kishio Yamaguchi was the Vice President of Japan Airlines. Kishio, who died in the early 1990s, was deeply involved in the running of the I.K.G.A whilst his youngest sister Wakako Yamaguchi was an All Japan Kata Champion for a number of years. Makiko Yamaguchi died from subarachnoid hemorrhage at a relatively young age during the late 1980s.

== Sources ==
- Alexander, George, The Cat, Gogen Yamaguchi 10th Dan Collectors Edition DVD, (2002).
- Bishop, Mark, Okinawan Karate: Teachers, Styles and Secret Techniques, (1999).
- Black Belt Magazine, College of Hard Knocks, Gogen Yamaguchi's Nippon Karate-dō Senmon Gakko. (Summer Edition 1974).
- Brennan, Kevin, Australasian Fighting Arts Magazine 1977 April Edition.
- Craig, DM, IAI: The Art Of Drawing The Sword
- De Jong, Ingo,Goju-Kai Karate-do Hard and Soft in Harmony Sweden, Jakobsbergs Tryckeri, (1989)
- Green, TA, Svinth JR, Modern Arts in the Modern World, (2003)
- Kanazawa, Hirokazu, Karate My Life, (2003).
- Kane et al., The Way of Kata: A Comprehensive Guide for Deciphering Martial Applications (2005)
- Kim, Richard, The Weaponless Warriors, (1974)
- Noble, Graham, The Life Story of Karate Master Gogen Yamaguchi, Dragon Times.
- Palabrica, Sonny (1966), The "Cat". Gogen Yamaguchi, Head of Gojuryu Karate, Has Become A Legend in His Time, Black Belt Magazine, 28-35
- Ratti, O; Westbrook, A, Secrets of the Samurai: A Survey of the Martial Arts of Feudal Japan, (1999.)
- Starling, Paul, The End of an Era, Gogen Yamabuchi- Obituary, Australasian Fighting Arts,Aug-Sept Issue, p.p. 68-70 (1989). Training in Japan, Ibid, 1977 April issue.
- Urban, Peter, The Karate Dojo, (reprint 1991.)
- Urban, Peter, The Karate dojo, (1967)
- Williams, Johnpaul, Gōjū-Ryū Karate-Dō Desk Reference 剛柔流空手道 参考書: Volume 1 – Introduction & Historic Chronology 武道, 武術の歴史.
- Yamaguchi Gogen, Karate Gojū-ryū by the Cat. 1963 Rapid Print Co. Ltd Tokyo, Japan.
- Yamaguchi, Gogen, Goju-ryū Karate do Kyohan, Rising Sun Productions (1999)
- Yamaguchi, Goshi, Goju-ryū Karate A Visual Guide to Kumite Techniques Japan (1993)
- Yamaguchi, Norimi Gosei, Goju-ryū Karate do, Ohara Publications (1974)
