= The Fly (1986 film) =

1986 film by David Cronenberg

- Theatrical release poster
- Directed by: David Cronenberg
- Screenplay by: Charles Edward Pogue; David Cronenberg
- Based on: "The Fly"; 1957 story in Playboy by George Langelaan
- Produced by: Stuart Cornfeld; Mel Brooks (Note: Brooks opted to have his work be uncredited, as to not confuse audiences into thinking the film was a comedy)
- Starring: Jeff Goldblum; Geena Davis; John Getz
- Cinematography: Mark Irwin
- Edited by: Ronald Sanders
- Music by: Howard Shore
- Production companies: Brooksfilms; SLM Production Group
- Distributed by: 20th Century Fox
- Release date: August 15, 1986
- Running time: 96 minutes
- Country: United States
- Language: English
- Budget: $9–15 million
- Box office: $60.6 million

The Fly is a 1986 American science fiction body horror film directed and co-written by David Cronenberg. Produced by Brooksfilms and distributed by 20th Century Fox, the film stars Jeff Goldblum, Geena Davis, and John Getz. Loosely based on George Langelaan's 1957 short story of the same name and the 1958 film of the same name, The Fly tells of an eccentric scientist who, after one of his experiments goes wrong, slowly turns into a fly-hybrid creature. The score was composed by Howard Shore and the make-up effects were created by Chris Walas, along with makeup artist Stephan Dupuis.

The Fly was released on August 15, 1986, to positive reviews. It grossed $60.6 million at the box office, becoming a commercial success. Walas and Dupuis's work on the film resulted in them winning an Academy Award for Best Makeup. The tagline of the film, "Be afraid. Be very afraid.", has been used in many other productions as part of popular culture. A sequel, directed by Walas, was released in 1989.

== Plot ==
Seth Brundle, a brilliant but eccentric scientist, meets Veronica "Ronnie" Quaife, a science journalist, at a press event. He takes her back to his home and laboratory and shows her his invention: a set of "telepods" that allows instantaneous teleportation between them. Seth convinces Ronnie to keep the invention secret in exchange for exclusive rights to the story, and she documents his work. Although the telepods can transport inanimate objects, they mutilate live tissue, as demonstrated when a baboon is turned inside-out during an experiment.

Seth and Ronnie begin a romantic relationship. Their first sexual encounter inspires Seth to reprogram the telepod to understand the makeup of living tissue. After he successfully teleports a second baboon, Ronnie hurriedly leaves to confront her editor Stathis Borans about his threat, spurred by his jealousy of Seth, to publish the story without her consent. Embittered and convinced she is rekindling her relationship with Stathis, Seth teleports himself alone, unaware that a fly has slipped inside the transmitter pod with him. He emerges from the receiving pod seemingly normal. Seth and Ronnie later reconcile.

Seth starts to exhibit increased strength, stamina, and sexual potency, which he attributes to the teleportation "purifying" his body. Ronnie grows concerned about Seth's changing personality and the strange, bristly hairs growing from a wound on his back. Seth becomes arrogant and violent, insisting that the teleportation process is beneficial, and tries to force Ronnie to undergo teleportation. When she refuses, he abandons her, goes to a bar and partakes in an arm-wrestling match, where he leaves his opponent with a compound fracture. He brings a woman named Tawny back to his warehouse to have intercourse. When Seth tries to coerce her into teleporting, Ronnie stops him and Seth throws her out as well.

When his fingernails begin falling off, Seth realizes something is wrong. He reviews the telepod's computer and discovers the fly that was in the pod with him. The computer, confused by the presence of two lifeforms, fused him with the fly at the molecular-genetic level.

Seth continues to deteriorate, losing body parts and becoming less human in appearance. After several weeks, he reconnects with Ronnie and says he is becoming a hybrid of human and insect he nicknamed "Brundlefly." He has begun vomiting digestive enzymes onto his food to dissolve it and gained the ability to cling to walls and ceilings. He also realizes that he is losing his human reason and compassion, driven by primitive impulses he cannot control.

Seth installs a fusion program into the telepod computer, planning to dilute the fly genes in his body with human DNA. Ronnie learns that she is pregnant by Seth, but does not know if the conception occurred before or after Seth's genes were corrupted. She worries that the child will not be human, and has a nightmare of giving birth to a giant maggot. She visits Brundle in order to break the news to him, but he warns her that he will harm her if she continues to visit. Terribly upset, she has Stathis persuade a doctor to perform an abortion in the middle of the night. Having overheard their conversation, Seth abducts Ronnie and begs her to carry the child to term, since it may be the last remnant of his humanity. Stathis breaks into Seth's lab with a shotgun, but Seth incapacitates him with his corrosive vomit.

Seth reveals his desperate plan to Ronnie: he will use the telepods to fuse himself and her, together with their unborn child, into one entity. As Seth drags her into one of the telepods, she accidentally rips off his jaw, triggering his final transformation into an insectoid-human "Brundlefly" creature, shedding his decayed human skin. Seth traps Ronnie inside the first telepod and enters the other, planning to use the prototype pod as the receiver of the combination of pods 1 and 2. The wounded Stathis uses his shotgun to sever the cables connecting Ronnie's telepod to the computer, allowing Ronnie to escape. The damage causes telepod 2 to malfunction and Seth attempts to smash his way through the door, only for the pod to activate just as he is stepping out, fusing Seth to a piece of the door and other components. The prototype pod receives the Brundlefly/Telepod fusion successfully; as the door opens, Seth falls out of the door and to the ground. He crawls to Ronnie and silently requests for her to end his misery by aiming Stathis's shotgun barrel, which she had picked up, at his own head. She eventually, and tearfully, shoots and kills him, falling to her knees in despair.

== Cast ==
- Jeff Goldblum as Seth Brundle
- Geena Davis as Veronica "Ronnie" Quaife
- John Getz as Stathis Borans
- Joy Boushel as Tawny
- Leslie Carlson as Dr. Brent Cheevers
- George Chuvalo as Marky
- David Cronenberg as a Gynecologist

== Production ==
=== Development ===
In the early 1980s, co-producer Kip Ohman approached screenwriter Charles Edward Pogue with the idea of remaking the classic science fiction horror film The Fly. Pogue began by reading George Langelaan's short story and then watching the original film, which he had never seen. Deciding that he was interested in this project, he talked with producer Stuart Cornfeld about setting up the production, and Cornfeld very quickly agreed. The duo then pitched the idea to executives at 20th Century Fox and received an enthusiastic response, and Pogue was given money to write a first draft screenplay. He initially wrote an outline similar to that of Langelaan's story, but both he and Cornfeld thought that it would be better to rework the material to focus on a gradual metamorphosis instead of an instantaneous monster. However, when executives read the script, they were so unimpressed that they immediately withdrew from the project. After some negotiation, Cornfeld orchestrated a deal whereby Fox would agree to distribute the film if he could set up financing through another source.

The new producer was Mel Brooks; the film was to be produced by his company, Brooksfilms. Cornfeld was a frequent collaborator and friend of Brooks. Cornfeld gave the script to Brooks, who liked it but felt that a different writer was needed. Pogue was then removed from the project, and Cornfeld hired Walon Green for a rewrite. However, Green's draft was not a step in the desired direction, so Pogue was then sought to polish the material.

At the same time, Brooks and Cornfeld were trying to find a suitable director. David Cronenberg was shown the script for The Fly by Marc Boyman, who later produced Dead Ringers, but Cronenberg was working on Total Recall at the time. Cornfeld decided on a young British director named Robert Bierman after seeing one of his short films. Bierman was flown to Los Angeles to meet with Pogue, and the film was in the very early stages of preproduction when tragedy struck: Bierman's family had been vacationing in South Africa, and his daughter was killed in an accident. Bierman boarded a plane to go to his family, and Brooks and Cornfeld waited for a month before approaching him about resuming work on the picture. Bierman told them that he was unable to start working so soon, and Brooks told him that he would wait three months and contact him again. At the end of the three months, Bierman told him that he could not commit to the project. Brooks told him that he understood and had him freed from his contract.

=== Writing ===
Cronenberg's agent, Mike Marcus, informed Cronenberg, after he left the Total Recall production, that Mel Brooks was interested in The Fly. Cronenberg agreed to sign on as director if he would be allowed to rewrite the script. Cronenberg, who watched the original film when it came out, was critical of the initial script stating that "I remember reading it and the first sixteen pages were awful". Cronenberg was paid twice the amount that he was paid for directing The Dead Zone.

Cronenberg stated that "one line of dialogue from Chuck's script" remained in the final version. Despite the extensive rewrite of Pogue's script, Cronenberg insisted during Writers Guild arbitrations that he and Pogue share screenplay credit, since he felt that his version could not have come to pass without Pogue's script to serve as a foundation. He did not meet with Pogue, who liked the film, until after the film was released.

Pogue's version of the lead scientist "was rather a dull, clever techno guy; just a boring, handsome guy" according to Cronenberg.

=== Casting ===
Brooks wanted Pierce Brosnan to play the role of Seth Brundle, but Cronenberg rejected the casting. John Malkovich was the top choice for the role, but he declined. John Lithgow was also offered the role but turned it down, stating it was too grotesque. Michael Keaton (who would co-star with Davis two years later in Beetlejuice) and Richard Dreyfuss were also considered. Jeff Goldblum was proposed for the lead by Cronenberg as Goldblum was willing to perform with prosthetic makeup unlike other proposed actors like Dreyfuss.

Cornfeld opposed Geena Davis's casting due to her being Goldblum's then-real-life girlfriend. Cronenberg wanted Davis and Cornfeld made him "look at other actresses, but they were all disasters" which even Cornfeld admitted. Davis requested that Cronenberg play the gynecologist as she did not want a stranger performing the role.

=== Filming ===
The film's budget was reported as $9 million and $15 million. It was shot in Canada at the Kleinburg Studio in Toronto. Chris Walas, who worked on Scanners, was hired to create the film's special effects. Principal photography began on December 1, 1985, in Toronto.

The film's audio mixing was done in London as it was cheaper than Los Angeles. The producers commissioned musician Bryan Ferry to record a song for the film for promotional purposes. The resulting track was "Help Me". A music video was made for the song, and footage from the film was prominently featured in it. Cronenberg admitted to liking the song, but he felt that it was inappropriate to the film itself. Brooks and Cornfeld originally wanted to play the song over the closing credits, but after Cronenberg screened it for them, they agreed with the director that it did not mesh with the movie. As a result, the song is featured only briefly in the film, in the background during the scene where Brundle challenges Marky in the bar. "Help Me" became rather obscure, as it was not included on the film's soundtrack release. The song resurfaced in 1988 on the Roxy Music/Bryan Ferry compact disc Ultimate Collection.

The design of Brundle's telepods was inspired by the engine cylinder of Cronenberg's Ducati Desmo motorcycle.

=== Deleted and alternate scenes ===
After filming ended early in 1986, a rough cut of The Fly was shown to Fox executives, who were very impressed. A rough cut was then previewed at Toronto's Uptown Theatre in the spring of that year. Due to a strong audience reaction, the graphic and infamous "monkey-cat" sequence was cut from the film to make it easier for audiences to maintain sympathy for Brundle's character. Another preview screening was subsequently held at the Fox lot in Los Angeles, and this version featured the "butterfly baby" coda. As before, the screening results dictated that the scene be cut. Another ending had Ronnie wake up next to Stathis, who she is married to, and is pregnant with his child, but it was disliked by audiences according to Cronenberg.

=== Makeup and creature effects ===
The different stages of Seth Brundle's gradual transformation into "Brundlefly"

The Academy Award-winning makeup was designed and executed by Chris Walas, Inc. over a period of three months. The final "Brundlefly" creature was designed first, and then the various steps needed to carry protagonist Seth Brundle to that final incarnation were designed. The transformation was intended to be a metaphor for the aging process. To that end, Brundle loses hair, teeth and fingernails, with his skin becoming more and more discolored and lumpy. The intention of the filmmakers was to give Brundle a bruised and cancerous look that gets progressively worse as the character's altered genome slowly asserts itself, with the final Brundlefly hybrid creature literally bursting out of Brundle's hideously deteriorated human skin. The creature itself was designed to appear horribly asymmetrical and deformed, and not at all a viable or robust organism.

Various looks were tested for the makeup effects. Some early test footage can be seen on the 2005 The Fly: Collector's Edition DVD, as well as the Blu-ray release.

The transformation was broken up into seven distinct stages, with Jeff Goldblum spending many hours in the makeup chair for Brundle's later incarnations.

- Stages 1 and 2: subtle, rash-like skin discoloration that leads to facial lesions and sores, with tiny fly hairs dotting Goldblum's face, in addition to the patch of fly hairs growing out of the wound on Brundle's back.
- Stages 3 and 4-A: piecemeal prosthetics covering Goldblum's face (and later his arms, feet, and torso), wigs with bald spots, and crooked, prosthetic teeth (beginning with stage 4-A).
- Stage 4-B: deleted from the film (but briefly appeared in the trailer), this variant of stage 4 was seen only in the "monkey-cat" scene, and required Goldblum to wear the first of two full-body foam latex suits, as Brundle has stopped wearing clothing at this point.
- Stage 5: the second full-body suit, with more exaggerated deformities, and which also required Goldblum to wear distorting contact lenses that made one eye look larger than the other.
- Stage 6: the final "Brundlefly" creature (referred to as the "space bug" by the film's crew), depicted by various partial and full-body cable- and rod-controlled puppets.
- Stage 7: another puppet which represented the mortally injured Brundlefly-Telepod fusion creature (initially dubbed the "Brundlebooth" and later the "Brundlething" by the crew) as seen in the film's final moments.

== Music ==
The score to The Fly was composed and conducted by Howard Shore, and performed by the London Philharmonic Orchestra. It was released on record, cassette, and Compact Disc (with three additional tracks exclusively included on the latter) by Varèse Sarabande, and in 2005, it was remastered and reissued on a two-disc set with Christopher Young's album for The Fly II.

Titles in bold are exclusive to the CD release. The soundtrack presents the music out of order from the movie's presentation.

1. Main Title 1:54
2. Plasma Pool 1:54
3. The Last Visit 2:25
4. Stathis Enters 2:20
5. The Phone Call 2:07
6. Seth Goes Through 2:02
7. Ronnie Comes Back 0:55
8. The Jump 1:21
9. **Seth and the Fly** 2:21
10. Particle Magazine 1:02
11. The Armwrestle 0:51
12. **Brundlefly** 1:43
13. Ronnie's Visit 0:35
14. **The Street** 0:43
15. The Stairs 1:25
16. The Fingernails 2:35
17. Baboon Teleportation 0:58
18. The Creature 2:08
19. Steak Montage 0:59
20. The Maggot/Fly Graphic 1:37
21. Success With Baboon 0:58
22. The Ultimate Family 1:59
23. The Finale 2:51

== Reception ==
=== Box office ===
The film earned $40,456,565 domestically and $20,172,594 internationally, totaling $60,629,159 at the worldwide box office.

=== Critical response ===
According to Metacritic, The Fly received "universal acclaim", based on a weighted average of 81 out of 100 from 12 critic reviews. On Rotten Tomatoes, 82% of 168 reviews are positive for the film. The website's critical consensus reads, "Fusing strong characters and gripping pathos, David Cronenberg’s The Fly transforms its grotesque sci-fi horror concept into an unexpectedly moving tragedy with strong performances, dark humor, and visceral imagery." Audiences polled by CinemaScore gave the film an average grade of "B" on an A+ to F scale.

After its release, The Fly was described as a remake that surpasses the original and exceeds the potential of the original story. Chicago Tribune called it a rare personal work of art that is also a commercial success. Los Angeles Times hailed the film as a stunning piece of filmmaking that allowed the audience to identify with the monstrous creation. Time wrote that The Fly is a shocking horror film and also the most touching romance film of the year. Conversely, Caryn James of The New York Times criticized the film for what she considered distractingly excessive gore, lack of emotional depth and tonal inconsistency. She felt that the film tries to be too many things at once and ultimately falls short, despite Goldblum's performance and the ambitious vision of Cronenberg.

Cronenberg was surprised when The Fly was seen by some critics as a cultural metaphor specifically for AIDS, since he originally intended the film to be a more general analogy for disease itself, terminal conditions like cancer and, more specifically, the aging process:

If you, or your lover, has AIDS, you watch that film and of course you'll see AIDS in it, but you don't have to have that experience to respond emotionally to the movie and I think that's really its power. This is not to say that AIDS didn't have an incredible impact on everyone and, of course, after a certain point, people were seeing AIDS stories everywhere, so I don't take any offense that people see that in my movie. For me though, there was something about The Fly story that was much more universal: aging and death—something all of us have to deal with.

Chicago Tribune film critic Gene Siskel named The Fly as the tenth-best film of 1986. In agreement with Siskel, fellow Chicago film critic Roger Ebert of the Chicago Sun-Times, said the film was on his top 20 films list for 1986 and that "Goldblum, I think, deserves an Academy Award nomination" for his role in The Fly. In 1989, Premiere and American Film magazines both conducted independent polls of American film critics, directors and other such groups to determine the best films of the 1980s, and The Fly appeared on both lists.

John Nubbin reviewed The Fly for Different Worlds magazine and stated that "Choosing to remake The Fly and clean up its mistakes was more than a wise move. It may have been the first step in pointing up the problem Hollywood has been having with its 're-creations.' Maybe, just maybe, if some others can profit from this lesson, the next remake will be of Planet of the Prehistoric Women, which could use all the help it could get, and not Forbidden Planet, which is all right just the way it is."

In 2005, Time magazine film critics Richard Corliss and Richard Schickel included The Fly in their list of the Time's All-Time 100 Movies. Time later named it one of the 25 best horror films. The film was ranked #33 on Bravo's The 100 Scariest Movie Moments. Similarly, the Chicago Film Critics Association named The Fly the 32nd scariest film ever made. In 2021, The Daily Star ranked The Fly at the top of its list of greatest short story adaptations, praising the film for "exhibit[ing] how greater a short story can evolve, and very much become its own detached, barely recognisable thing."

=== Comparison with The Metamorphosis ===
Some critics claim that The Fly is Cronenberg's vision of The Metamorphosis by Franz Kafka. Cronenberg, in his introduction to the 2014 translation of The Metamorphosis by Susan Bernofsky, stresses the differences between the two works.

=== Accolades ===
The Fly was nominated for the awards in the chart below. Many genre fans and film critics at the time thought that Jeff Goldblum's performance would receive a Best Actor Oscar nomination, but this did not happen. Gene Siskel subsequently stated that Goldblum most likely "got stiffed" out of a nomination because the older Academy voters generally do not honor horror films.

Award	Date of ceremony	Category	Recipient(s)	Result	Ref(s)
Avoriaz International Fantastic Film Festival	1987	Special Jury Prize	The Fly	Won	
Academy Award	March 30, 1987	Best Makeup	Chris Walas and Stephan Dupuis	Won	
Canadian Society of Cinematographers	1987	Best Cinematography	Mark Irwin	Won	
14th Saturn Awards	May 17, 1987	Best Horror Film	The Fly	Won	
14th Saturn Awards	May 17, 1987	Best Make-up	Chris Walas	Won	
14th Saturn Awards	May 17, 1987	Best Actor	Jeff Goldblum	Won	
Hugo Award	September 1, 1987	Best Dramatic Presentation	The Fly	Nominated	
British Academy Film Awards	March 20, 1988	Best Makeup and Hair	Chris Walas and Stephan Dupuis	Nominated	
British Academy Film Awards	March 20, 1988	Best Special Visual Effects	John Evans	Nominated	

=== Legacy ===
The quote "Be afraid. Be very afraid." was also used as the film's marketing tagline, and this became so ingrained in popular culture (as it—and variants—have appeared in numerous films and TV series) that many people who are familiar with the phrase are unaware that it originated in The Fly.

On October 10, 2020, the film was referenced in a Saturday Night Live sketch regarding the 2020 vice presidential debate. Jim Carrey provided an impression of Jeff Goldblum.

Heavy metal band Ice Nine Kills released "F.L.Y" as part of their 2021 album The Silver Scream 2: Welcome to Horrorwood. The song is inspired by the 1986 film.

== Sequel ==
Whereas the 1958 original was followed by two sequels, Cronenberg has said that the stories in his films have definitive beginnings and endings, and he has never considered making a sequel to one of his own films, although others have made sequels to Cronenberg films, including Scanners (1981).

The Fly II (1989) was directed by Chris Walas, the man behind the makeup and creature effects of both films and Gremlins. It is a direct continuation of The Fly. It features Veronica Quaife giving birth to Brundle's mutant son before dying, and it focuses on the Bartok company's attempts to get the Telepods working again.

David Cronenberg was not involved with the project. The only actor to return for the sequel was John Getz as an embittered Stathis Borans. Veronica Quaife appears briefly in the film. She is played by Saffron Henderson, since Geena Davis declined to reprise the role. Jeff Goldblum appears in archival footage of Seth Brundle in two scenes, including the post-teleportation interview segment that was deleted from the first film.

An early treatment for a sequel, written by Tim Lucas, involved Veronica Quaife dealing with the evils of the Bartok company. Brundle's consciousness had somehow survived within the Telepod computer, and the Bartok scientists had enslaved him and were using him to develop the system for cloning purposes. Brundle becomes able to communicate with Veronica through the computer, and he eventually takes control of the Bartok complex's security systems to gruesomely attack the villains. Eventually, Veronica frees Brundle by conspiring with him to reintegrate a non-contaminated version of his original body. Cronenberg endorsed this concept at the time. Geena Davis was open to doing a sequel (and only pulled out of The Fly II because her character was to be killed in the opening scene), while Goldblum was not (although he determined a cameo appearance was acceptable), and this treatment reflects that. However, a later treatment written by Jim and Ken Wheat was used as the basis for the final script, written by Frank Darabont. Mick Garris also wrote a treatment, with elements incorporated into the final film.

== Comic books ==
Beginning in March 2015 IDW Publishing released The Fly: Outbreak, a five-issue comic book miniseries written by Brandon Seifert. The story is a direct sequel to the events of The Fly II, and features Seth Brundle's son, Martin, inadvertently causing a transgenic outbreak while attempting to cure Anton Bartok, to whom he'd previously transferred his mutant genes at the end of The Fly II.

== Canceled projects ==
=== Renny Harlin's alternate sequel ===
In the 1990s, Geena Davis was involved with an alternate sequel to The Fly, to be directed by her then-husband, Renny Harlin, titled Flies. The script by Richard Jefferies featured a story in which Veronica gives birth to twin boys, but survives the ordeal. The paranoid Veronica fears that the boys will begin developing fly-hybrid characteristics. When they eventually do, she uses the teleporter to merge the untainted human genes from each twin into a single, new being. As a result, the authorities believe that she murdered one of the children, since there is now only one child.

=== Todd Lincoln's second remake ===
In 2003, it was announced that a second remake of The Fly was being developed, to be directed by Todd Lincoln, produced by Fox Searchlight Pictures, and released in 2006, but this did not happen.

=== David Cronenberg's sequel ===
In 2009, it was rumored that David Cronenberg himself was preparing to direct a second remake of The Fly, but it was not until 2011 that the director addressed the rumors. Cronenberg stated that he had written not a remake, but rather a "sort of" sequel script to his 1986 version, and would film it if 20th Century Fox gave the project the go-ahead:

I have written a script that is more of a strange lateral, let's say oblique sequel than it is a true sequel, and it's certainly not a remake of the original. It's financed by Fox, and whether it will get made or not, I cannot say at the moment because there are a lot of up-in-the-air factors that deal with internal studio politics and a bunch of other things that I'm not in control of. But I would make it if they greenlight it, let's put it that way.

Cronenberg elaborated further when interviewed by Empire in 2012:

Well, I did talk to Fox, because my agent found out that they were approaching people to do a remake of my film. He sort of said, "Well, you know, what about David?" And they said, "Well, we never thought of that!" I think they'd been to Guillermo del Toro and Michael Bay. I said, "Long ago I proposed a sequel to Mel Brooks when he said he wanted to make a sequel." He didn't like what I proposed because he said it wasn't the same as the original movie. "A sequel," he said, "should be more of the same." And I said, "Well, Mel, then I'm not interested." And he went off and did his sequels [sic] and they had nothing to do with me and they weren't very successful. But I still had this idea in mind—which no, I won't tell you—and I said to Fox, "I'll write that idea up because, as I think of it, it could be interesting." And they were excited about it enough to pay me to write a script. And then for various reasons it kind of got bogged down. I don't know exactly why. It seems now that it's not going to happen. But it's a script that I like and would do. It's not exactly a sequel, and it's certainly not a remake. More a meditation [...] it involves teleportation.

In a late 2012 interview, Cronenberg provided additional details on why the project had stalled, citing

Budget constraints and other things. I think maybe the script that I wrote was a little too radical for Fox, and they felt it really needed to be a very low-budget film at that point. However, what was in it that attracted them could not be done low-budget. So I think that was the problem.

He also described the project as "more of a sequel or a sidebar. It was a meditation on fly-ness. None of the same characters or anything and, of course, with an understanding of modern technology."

Despite Cronenberg's prior assertions that he does not make sequels to his films, he returned to The Fly for the opera The Fly in 2008, and his proposed sequel film project would mark a second return to the material, as well as his first sequel to one of his previous movies. However, the film is not moving forward.

On June 15, 2018, Jeff Goldblum said he would be interested in doing a sequel only if Cronenberg was involved, even though his character died. "I don't think my character would be involved because of course I got tragically mutated with the fly and then the machine, oh boy. But maybe I show up as a grandchild of the original Seth Brundle, or Seth Brundle had a brother. Had a brother that emerges in some ways! Who knows, I don't know but David Cronenberg was a thrill to work with. Boy, if he was involved, I'd like to work with him again, I'll tell you that."

=== Nikyatu Jusu's reboot ===
In November 2024, a new film set in the same universe as Cronenberg's film was announced, to be written and directed by Nikyatu Jusu.

== Works cited ==
- Cronenberg, David (2006). David Cronenberg: Interviews with Serge Grünberg. Plexus Publishing. ISBN 0859653765.
- Mathijs, Ernest (2008). The Cinema of David Cronenberg: From Baron of Blood to Cultural Hero. Wallflower Press. ISBN 9781905674657.
- Rodley, Chris, ed. (1997). Cronenberg on Cronenberg. Faber and Faber. ISBN 0571191371.
