= Hoyts Edgley =

Australian film and television production company

Hoyts Edgley was a short lived Australian film and television production company.

== Company background ==
It was formed in the wake of the success of The Man from Snowy Mountain (1982) in which Michael Edgley had invested. Simon Wincer had known Edgely for over twenty years and they decided to work together.

The company was run by Terry Jackman and Jonathon Chissick from Hoyts and Michael Edgley and Simon Wincer from Michael Edgely International. Bill MacCartney was chief executive.

== Select filmography ==
- Phar Lap (1983)
- One Night Stand (1984)
- The Coolangatta Gold (1984)
- An Indecent Obsession (1985)
- Burke & Wills (1985)
- The Boy Who Had Everything (1986)

== See also ==
- List of film production companies
- List of television production companies
