= Peter Schreck =

Australian writer

Peter Schreck (born 1942) is an Australian writer, best known for his work in television.

== Select Credits ==
- Because He's My Friend (1978) - TV movie
- We of the Never Never (1982) - film
- The Coolangatta Gold (1984) - film
- Police Rescue (1991) - film
- Wildside (1999) - TV series
- Young Lions (2002) - TV series
