= Chris Walas =

American special effects artist

- Born: Christopher James Walas; 1955 (age 70–71); Chicago, Illinois, U.S.
- Other names: Christopher Walas; Christopher J. Walas
- Occupations: Special effects artist; Special make-up effects artist; Film director; Film producer; Screenwriter
- Years active: 1978–present

Christopher James Walas (born 1955) is an American special effects artist, make-up effects artist, film director, producer, and screenwriter. He is best known for his work on the film The Fly (1986), for which he won an Academy Award and was nominated for two British Academy Film Awards.

== Biography ==
His main body of work is with special effects in a wide variety of films, from science fiction to action-adventure. His work on The Fly won him an Academy Award for Best Makeup and Hairstyling and led to his directorial debut on The Fly II.

Walas grew up a fan of monster movies and particularly the work of Ray Harryhausen, even considering becoming a stop motion animator. After moving to Los Angeles in his early twenties seeking any filmmaking opportunity, he got a job at Don Post Studios, a mask-making company, learning all about creation of props and prosthetics. After meeting Phil Tippett making Piranha, Walas was recruited by him to do effects in Dragonslayer. At the same time Tippett joined another Industrial Light & Magic production, Raiders of the Lost Ark, being responsible for the famous scene where the Nazis melt from the intense heat created by the Ark of the Covenant. Walas would then work in Return of the Jedi, designing five creatures seen in Jabba the Hutt's palace. Walas left ILM to found his own company, Chris Walas Inc. (CWI), once he was recruited by Piranha director Joe Dante to create the creatures from Gremlins. CWI remained in high demand for film, television and commercials.

== Filmographies ==
=== Special effects ===
2002	Dark Heaven	designer: angels
1991	Curse III: Blood Sacrifice	monster design
1991	Naked Lunch	special effects and monster design
1990	Arachnophobia	creature effects supervisor
1989	The Fly II	effects designer and creator: Chris Walas Inc.
1987	House II: The Second Story	makeup and creature effects designer
1986	The Fly	creature effects
1985	Enemy Mine	aliens creator and designer: Chris Walas Inc. special creature makeup and effects director: Chris Walas Inc.
1984	Gremlins	creator: Gremlins
1983	Return of the Jedi	creature consultant
1982	E.T. the Extraterrestrial	model maker (uncredited)
1981	Dragonslayer	close-up dragon: ILM
1980	Airplane!	special projects
1980	Humanoids from the Deep	special effects (uncredited)
1979	Up from the Depths	special effects
1978	Piranha	special properties

=== Makeup effects ===
1995	Jade	special makeup effects
1995	Virtuosity	special makeup effects
1989	Tales from the Crypt: "The Switch"	special makeup effects
1985	Enemy Mine	special makeup effects
1984	Gremlins	special makeup effects
1981	Raiders of the Lost Ark	special makeup effects: ILM
1981	Caveman	creator: abominable snowman
1981	Scanners	special makeup effects
1980	Galaxina	special makeup effects
1979	Something Waits in the Dark (later known as Screamers)	special makeup effects, U.S. filmed additions to L'isola degli uomini pesce

=== Visual effects ===
2002	Dark Heaven	visual effects

=== Director ===
1992	The Vagrant
1990	Tales from the Crypt: "'Til Death"
1989	The Fly II

== Awards and nominations ==
Year	Award	Category	Nominated work	Result
1985	12th Saturn Awards	Best Special Effects	Gremlins	Won
1986	13th Saturn Awards	Best Make-up	Enemy Mine	Nominated
1987	59th Academy Awards	Best Makeup	The Fly	Won
1987	14th Saturn Awards	Best Make-up	The Fly	Won
1988	41st British Academy Film Awards	Best Make-up Artist	The Fly	Nominated
1988	41st British Academy Film Awards	Best Special Effects	The Fly	Nominated
1993	2nd Fangoria Chainsaw Awards	Best Makeup Effects	Naked Lunch	Nominated
