= The Fly II =

1989 science fiction horror film directed by Chris Walas

- Theatrical release poster
- Directed by: Chris Walas
- Screenplay by: Mick Garris; Frank Darabont; Jim Wheat Ken Wheat
- Based on: Characters by George Langelaan
- Produced by: Steven-Charles Jaffe
- Starring: Eric Stoltz; Daphne Zuniga; Lee Richardson; Harley Cross; John Getz
- Cinematography: Robin Vidgeon
- Edited by: Sean Barton
- Music by: Christopher Young
- Production companies: Brooksfilms
- Distributed by: 20th Century Fox
- Release date: February 10, 1989
- Running time: 105 minutes
- Country: United States
- Language: English
- Budget: $12.5 million
- Box office: $38.9 million

The Fly II is a 1989 American science fiction horror film directed by Chris Walas. The film stars Eric Stoltz and Daphne Zuniga, and is a sequel to the 1986 film The Fly, itself a remake of the 1958 film of the same name. Stoltz's character in this sequel is the adult son of Veronica Quaife and Seth Brundle, a scientist who became a human-fly hybrid as a result of an experiment gone awry, played by Jeff Goldblum in the 1986 remake. With the exception of footage of Goldblum from the first film, John Getz was the only actor to reprise his role, with another actress filling the Geena Davis role as Quaife in the opening birth scene. The Fly II was released by 20th Century Fox on February 10, 1989. Unlike the previous film, this film received negative reviews and grossed less at the box office than its predecessor.

== Plot ==
Several months after the events of The Fly, Veronica Quaife gives birth to a larval sac and dies. The sac splits open to reveal a seemingly normal baby boy. Anton Bartok, the owner of the company that financed Seth Brundle's teleportation experiments, adopts the child and names him Martin. Martin grows up in a clinical environment. His physical and mental maturity is highly accelerated, and he possesses a genius-level intellect, incredible reflexes, and no need for sleep. He knows he is aging faster than a normal human, but is unaware of the true cause, having been told his father died from the same rapid aging disease.

At age three, Martin has the physique of a 10-year-old and frequently sneaks around to explore the Bartok complex. He finds a room containing laboratory animals and befriends a dog. The next night, he brings it food but finds it missing. He enters an observation booth overlooking Bay 17. There, scientists have reassembled Brundle's Telepods, but have been unable to duplicate the programming that enabled them to teleport living subjects. An attempt to teleport the dog fails, leaving it horribly deformed. It maims one of the scientists, horrifying Martin. Two years later, Martin's body has matured to that of a 25-year-old. On his fifth birthday, Bartok presents Martin with a bungalow on the Bartok facility's property and offers Martin the job of repairing his father's Telepods. When Martin is uneasy about the proposition, Bartok shows him Veronica Quaife's videotapes, which documented Seth Brundle's progress with the Telepods. Seeing his father describe how the Telepods ostensibly improved and energized his body, Martin accepts Bartok's proposal.

As he works on the Telepods, Martin befriends an employee, Beth Logan. Beth invites Martin to a party at the specimens division, where he learns that the mutated dog is still kept alive and studied. Thinking Beth is aware of the dog's imprisonment, Martin argues with her, leaves the party, and goes to the animal's holding pen. The deformed dog, in terrible pain, still remembers Martin, and he tearfully euthanizes it with chloroform. Martin reconciles with Beth and arrives at his father's revelation and realizes the Telepods' computer needs to analyze living flesh. Martin shows Beth his perfected Telepods by teleporting a kitten without harm. They become lovers, but Martin shows signs of his eventual mutation into a human-fly hybrid. Martin devises a potential cure for his condition, which involves swapping out his mutated genes for healthy human genes. Martin shelves this idea when he realizes the other person would be subject to a grotesque genetic disfigurement.

Eventually, Martin learns that Bartok has hidden cameras in his bungalow. Martin breaks into Bartok's records room, where he learns of his father's true fate. Bartok confronts Martin and explains that he is aware of and has been waiting for his inevitable mutation. Bartok reveals his plan to use Martin's body and the Telepods' potential for genetic manipulation for profit. Martin's insect genes fully awaken and his transformation into a human-insect hybrid begins, and he escapes from Bartok Industries. Bartok is unable to use the Telepods, as they are locked by a password. Martin also installed a computer virus which will erase the Telepods' programming if the wrong password is entered. Bartok orders a search for Martin.

Martin goes to Beth and explains the situation, and the two flee. They visit Veronica Quaife's old confidant, Stathis Borans, now a bitter, reclusive drunk after Veronica's death, who confirms for Martin that the Telepods are his only chance for a cure. They keep running, but Martin's physical and emotional changes become too much for Beth to handle, and she eventually surrenders them both to Bartok. Without revealing the password, Martin becomes enveloped in a cocoon. Bartok interrogates Beth for the password. Shortly after, the fully transformed Martin emerges from his cocoon and breaks into Bay 17. He grabs Bartok, forces him to type in the password, "Dad", and drags Bartok and himself into a Telepod. Martin gestures Beth to activate the gene-swapping sequence and she complies. Martin is restored to a fully human form, and Bartok is transformed into a hideously deformed monstrosity.

Inside the dog's former enclosure, the Bartok creature crawls towards a food bowl filled with slops, and sees a single housefly sitting on its edge.

== Cast ==
- Eric Stoltz as Martin Brundle
  - Harley Cross as 10-year-old Martin
    (age 3, but advanced body)
- Daphne Zuniga as Beth Logan
- Lee Richardson as Anton Bartok
- Garry Chalk as Scorby
- Ann Marie Lee as Jainway
- Frank Turner as Norman Shepard
- John Getz as Stathis Borans

In addition, Saffron Henderson briefly appears as Veronica Quaife, the role played by Geena Davis in the original film while archive footage of Jeff Goldblum, uncredited, shows him in the Seth Brundle role from the original film.

== Production ==
Early in development, Tim Burton was a director for consideration. Mick Garris was hired to write and direct The Fly II and wrote multiple drafts of the film before losing patience with the production and joining Critters 2 due to liking the script and New Line Cinema offering him creative input. Following Garris' departure, Chris Walas who had provided the effects work for The Fly was hired as director. In an October 2020 interview with Entertainment Weekly, Garris stated:

My exec on the project was Scott Rudin, who later became one of the best and most tasteful of producers. Producer Stuart Cornfeld and I wanted to do something smart and adult in the realm of the brilliant Cronenberg movie that preceded it, and Scott was completely on board with us. But Leonard Goldberg, producer of The Love Boat and other such TV shows, was inducted as the studio chief at Fox, and he wanted a teenage monster movie. Something completely other than what we planned. We had to give in, though, and I tried to do something as good as possible under the circumstances, and did a couple new drafts along those lines. But when the opportunity arose to direct my first feature film — Critters 2 — I bolted, and the rewrites were done by Frank Darabont and the Wheat brothers [Ken and Jim Wheat].

Ken and Jim Wheat were tasked with rewriting Mick Garris's draft of the screenplay after Fox turned down the duo's proposal for After Midnight. The Wheats described the initial draft of the film as "broad" and attempted to refocus the film but were unable to do so due to Fox's rushed schedule as well as receiving notes from eight different people that were oftentimes in conflict with each other. Frank Darabont provided further rewrites at the request of Walas.

On the writing process, Walas stated:

Oh those poor guys, they (the Wheat brothers) got caught in a huge vise between the studio, Mel Brooks, the producer, and myself. Everybody was giving them a lot of input and pressure. They formulated the basic script, almost an outline of what everyone was talking to them about. It helped tremendously because up to that point there hadn't been a clear vision of what FLY II was supposed to be. They needed somebody to finish the script, so Frank Darabont came on. He brought some real powerful dynamics to the story. The whole dog scene was his idea. He gave the major drama more power.

Despite the improvements Darabont brought to the script, the set production date meant that Darabont was only able to work on roughly half the script with the cast and crew ad libbing certain scenes and dialogue exchanges as needed.

Tom Sullivan worked as a sculptor for the film's visual effects.

Geena Davis, who played Veronica Quaife in the first film, was replaced by Saffron Henderson for the sequel, as Davis refused to reprise her role due to her character's death in the first act disallowing the opportunity for character development. Keanu Reeves was offered the role of Martin Brundle but turned it down as he disliked the script. Josh Brolin was passed after a failed audition for the role.

== Release ==
=== Home media ===
The film was released on VHS by CBS/FOX Video on August 3, 1989, and re-released on February 6, 1992.

In 2000 the film was released on DVD as a double feature with The Fly. The film received a standalone DVD release on October 5, 2004.

In March 2017, Australian distribution company Via Vision Entertainment released a five-disc, region-free box set containing the original 1958 The Fly, its sequels Return of the Fly and Curse of the Fly, the 1986 version of The Fly, and The Fly II on Blu-ray.

== Reception ==
=== Box office ===
The Fly II grossed $20,021,322 at the US box office and a further $18,881,857 abroad, resulting in a worldwide total of $38,903,179.

=== Critical response ===
On Rotten Tomatoes, the film holds an approval rating of 27% based on 26 reviews. On Metacritic, which assigns a normalized rating to reviews, the film has a weighted average score of 36 out of 100, based on 15 critics, indicating "generally unfavorable reviews". Audiences polled by CinemaScore gave the film an average grade of "B+" on an A+ to F scale.

Janet Maslin from The New York Times gave the film a negative review, writing, "The only respect in which it matches Mr. Cronenberg's Fly is in its sheer repulsiveness, since this film degenerates into a series of slime-ridden, glop-oozing special effects in its final half hour." Richard Harrington from The Washington Post offered the film similar criticism, calling the film's script "flat", and criticized the film's special effects as being "clumsy". Author and film critic Leonard Maltin awarded the film his lowest rating, calling the film "Alternately dull and messy but mostly dull". David Hughes from Empire awarded the film 3/5 stars, writing, "Whilst this fly is not as tightly scripted or keenly directed as its parent, it does have pace, breathless tension and the sort of gross-out effects that rules out kebabs for some time after the credits have rolled." Ryan Lambie of Den of Geek wrote that while the film "wasn't particularly clever, ... as an exercise in pure, claret-stained entertainment, it deserves far more credit than it frequently receives".

== Cancelled sequel ==
In July 1993, it was reported that development had begun on The Fly III with Richard Jefferies writing the screenplay. It would feature the return of Geena Davis' character Veronica "Ronnie" Quaife for Brooksfilms and 20th Century Fox. According to Mel Brooks, Davis was the one who initiated the project, including developing the story and serving as a producer. Production was slated to begin in Fall of 1993. The film would have shifted focus from Davis' character of Ronnie to the mutated twins she conceived with Seth Brundle from the first film. The film never came to be.

== Other media ==
=== Comic books ===
Beginning in March 2015, IDW Publishing released a five-issue comic book miniseries titled The Fly: Outbreak, written by Brandon Seifert.
