= Role of Christianity in Western society =

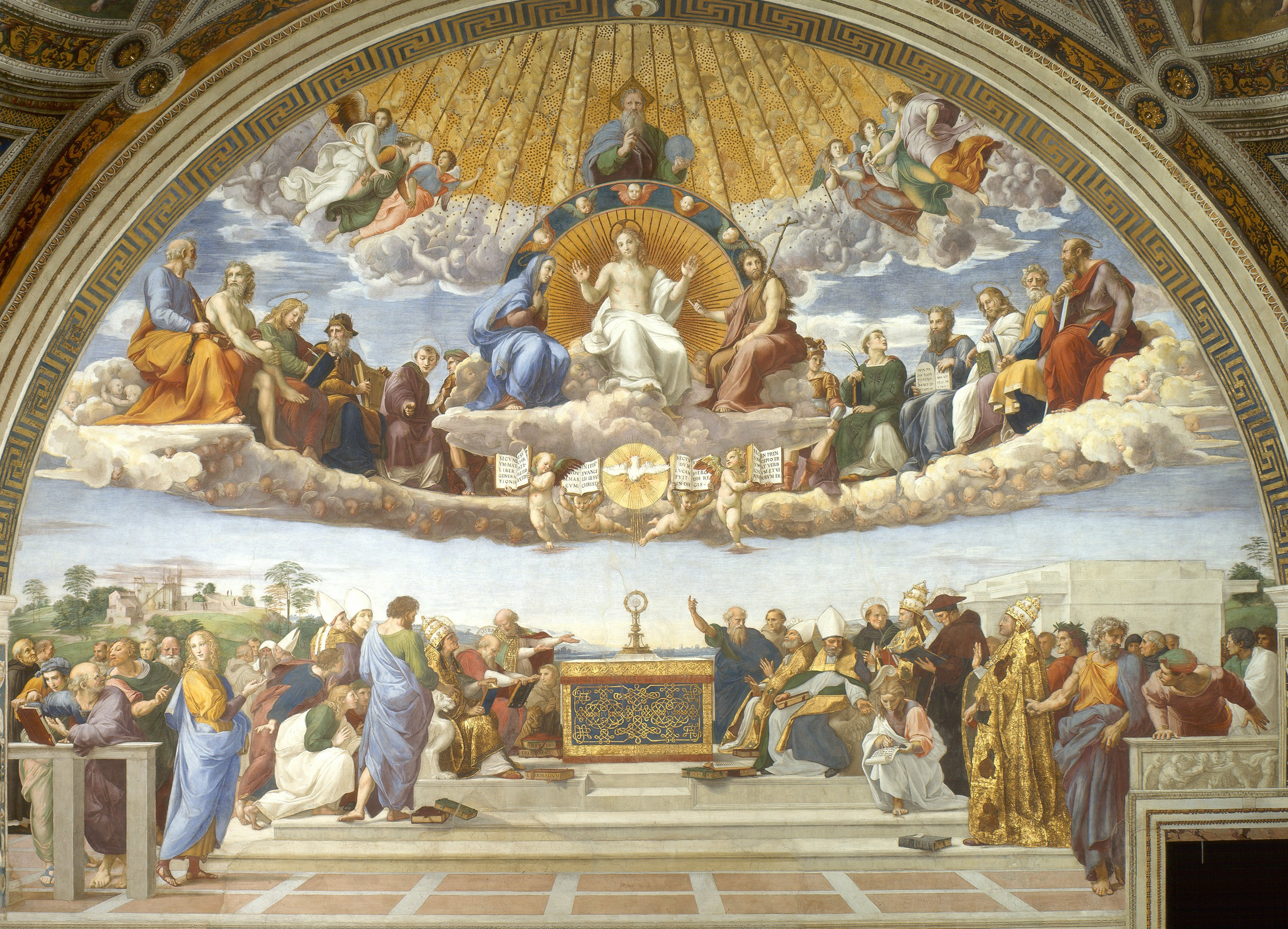
Disputation of the Holy Sacrament by Italian Renaissance artist Raphael, 1509–1510

Christianity has been intricately intertwined with the history and formation of Western society. Throughout its long history, the Catholic Church has been a major source of social services like schooling and medical care; an inspiration for art, culture and philosophy; and an influential player in politics and religion. In various ways it has sought to affect Western attitudes towards vice and virtue in diverse fields. Festivals like Easter and Christmas are marked as public holidays; the Gregorian Calendar has been adopted internationally as the civil calendar; and the calendar itself is measured from an estimation of the date of Jesus's birth.

The cultural influence of the Church has been vast. Church scholars preserved literacy in Western Europe following the Fall of the Western Roman Empire. During the Middle Ages, the Church rose to replace the Roman Empire as the unifying force in Europe and is credited with dissolving traditional kinship networks. The medieval cathedrals remain among the most iconic architectural feats produced by Western civilization. Many of Europe's universities were also founded by the church at that time. Many historians state that universities and cathedral schools were a continuation of the interest in learning promoted by monasteries. The university is generally regarded as an institution that has its origin in the Medieval Christian setting, born from Cathedral schools. Many scholars and historians attribute Christianity to having contributed to the rise of the Scientific Revolution.

The Reformation brought an end to religious unity in the West, but the Renaissance masterpieces produced by Catholic artists like Michelangelo, Leonardo da Vinci and Raphael remain among the most celebrated works of art ever produced. Similarly, Christian sacred music by composers like Pachelbel, Vivaldi, Bach, Handel, Mozart, Haydn, Beethoven, Mendelssohn, Liszt, and Verdi is among the most admired classical music in the Western canon.

The Bible and Christian theology have also strongly influenced Western philosophers and political activists. The teachings of Jesus, such as the Parable of the Good Samaritan, are argued by some to be among the most important sources of modern notions of "human rights" and the welfare commonly provided by governments in the West. Long-held Christian teachings on sexuality, marriage, and family life have also been influential and controversial in recent times. Christianity in general affected the status of women by condemning marital infidelity, divorce, incest, polygamy, birth control, infanticide (female infants were more likely to be killed), and abortion. While official Catholic Church teaching considers women and men to be complementary (equal and different), some modern "advocates of ordination of women and other feminists" argue that teachings attributed to St. Paul and those of the Fathers of the Church and Scholastic theologians advanced the notion of a divinely ordained female inferiority. Nevertheless, women have played prominent roles in Western history through and as part of the church, particularly in education and healthcare, but also as influential theologians and mystics.

Christians have made a myriad of contributions to human progress in a broad and diverse range of fields, both historically and in modern times, including science and technology, medicine, fine arts and architecture, politics, literatures, music, philanthropy, philosophy, ethics, humanism, theatre and business. According to 100 Years of Nobel Prizes, a review of Nobel Prize awards between 1901 and 2000 reveals that 65.4% of Nobel Prizes Laureates have identified Christianity in its various forms as their religious preference. Eastern Christians (particularly Nestorian Christians) have also contributed to the Arab Islamic Civilization during the Umayyad and the Abbasid periods by translating works of Greek philosophers to Syriac and afterwards to Arabic. They also excelled in philosophy, science, theology and medicine.

Rodney Stark writes that medieval Europe's advances in production methods, navigation, and war technology "can be traced to the unique Christian conviction that progress was a God-given obligation, entailed in the gift of reason. That new technologies and techniques would always be forthcoming was a fundamental article of Christian faith. Hence, no bishops or theologians denounced clocks or sailing ships—although both were condemned on religious grounds in various non-Western societies."

Christianity contributed greatly to the development of European cultural identity, although some progress originated elsewhere, Romanticism began with the curiosity and passion of the pagan world of old. Outside the Western world, Christianity has had an influence and contributed to various cultures, such as in Africa, Central Asia, the Near East, Middle East, East Asia, Southeast Asia, and the Indian subcontinent. Scholars and intellectuals have noted Christians have made significant contributions to Arab and Islamic civilization since the introduction of Islam.

== Politics and law ==
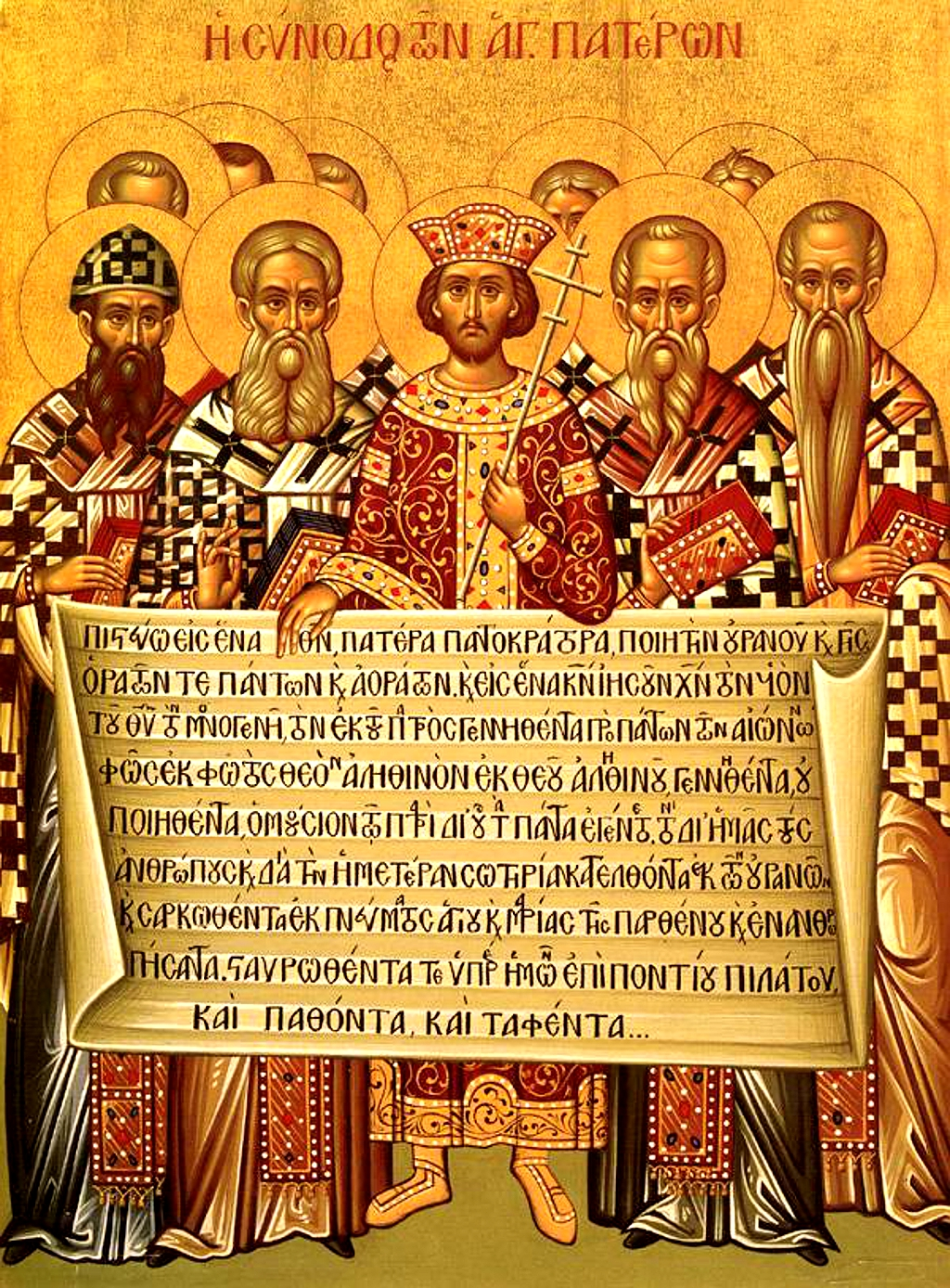
Icon depicting the Roman Emperor Constantine (centre) and the bishops of the First Council of Nicaea (325) holding the Niceno–Constantinopolitan Creed of 381

The relationship between Christianity, politics, and law is a complex, long-standing subject marked by diverse theological and philosophical perspectives. Throughout history, the church has navigated various roles, ranging from complete separation from the state to acting as a dominant political force, as seen during the Middle Ages or within the Roman Empire after Constantine’s conversion. Modern discourse remains divided, with some Christians advocating for active political engagement to promote justice, human flourishing, and public morality, while others emphasize a separation between the "kingdom of God" and worldly governance, warning against the potential for political power to corrupt religious integrity.

At the core of this debate is the question of how biblical principles—such as the pursuit of justice, the restraint of evil, and the duty to "love one's neighbor"—should influence legislative and societal frameworks. Many argue that Christianity provides a moral foundation for law, asserting that human statutes should be subordinate to divine or natural law. Conversely, others caution against attempting to "legislate the kingdom," arguing that political systems are inherently limited and incapable of achieving perfection. Ultimately, the discourse balances the belief that Christians have a duty to contribute to the common good with the conviction that their primary allegiance remains outside the sphere of partisan politics.

== Sexual morals ==
Classics scholar Kyle Harper says that for a period of time

"...the triumph of Christianity not only drove profound cultural change, it created a new relationship between sexual morality and society... The legacy of Christianity lies in the dissolution of an ancient system where social and political status, power, and the transmission of social inequality to the next generation scripted the terms of sexual morality."

— Kyle Harper, From Shame to Sin: The Christian Transformation of Sexual Morality in Late Antiquity, pages 4 and 7

Both the ancient Greeks and the Romans cared and wrote about sexual morality within categories of good and bad, pure and defiled, and ideal and transgression. But the sexual ethical structures of Roman society were built on status, and sexual modesty meant something different for men than it did for women, and for the well-born, than it did for the poor, and for the free citizen, than it did for the slave—for whom the concepts of honor, shame and sexual modesty could be said to have no meaning at all. Slaves were not thought to have an interior ethical life because they could go no lower socially and were commonly used sexually; the free and well born were thought to embody social honor and were therefore able to exhibit the fine sense of shame suited to their station. Roman literature indicates the Romans were aware of these dualities.

Shame was a profoundly social concept that was, in ancient Rome, always mediated by gender and status. "It was not enough that a wife merely regulate her sexual behavior in the accepted ways; it was required that her virtue in this area be conspicuous." Men, on the other hand, were allowed live-in mistresses called pallake. This, for example, permitted Roman society to find both a husband's control of a wife's sexual behavior a matter of intense importance and at the same time see his own sex with young boys as of little concern. Christianity sought to establish equal sexual standards for men and women and to protect all the young whether slave or free. This was a transformation in the deep logic of sexual morality.

Early Church Fathers advocated against adultery, polygamy, homosexuality, pederasty, bestiality, prostitution, and incest while advocating for the sanctity of the marriage bed. The central Christian prohibition against such porneia, which is a single name for that array of sexual behaviors, "collided with deeply entrenched patterns of Roman permissiveness where the legitimacy of sexual contact was determined primarily by status. St. Paul, whose views became dominant in early Christianity, made the body into a consecrated space, a point of mediation between the individual and the divine. Paul's over-riding sense that gender—rather than status or power or wealth or position—was the prime determinant in the propriety of the sex act was momentous. By boiling the sex act down to the most basic constituents of male and female, Paul was able to describe the sexual culture surrounding him in transformative terms."

Christian sexual ideology is inextricable from its concept of freewill. The Greeks and Romans said moralities depend on social position which is given by fate. Christianity "preached a liberating message of freedom". It was a revolution in the rules of behavior, but also in the very image of the human being as a sexual being, free, frail and awesomely responsible for one's own self to God alone.

== Marriage and family life ==
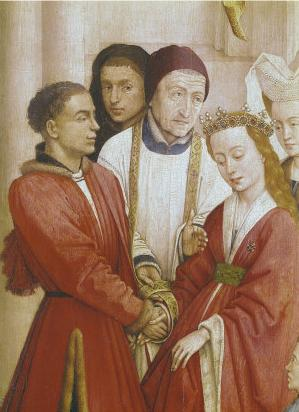
"Therefore what God has joined together, let not man separate." (Gospel of Matthew 19:6) Matrimony, The Seven Sacraments, Rogier van der Weyden, c. 1445.

There has been some debate as to whether the Church has improved the status of women or hindered their progress.

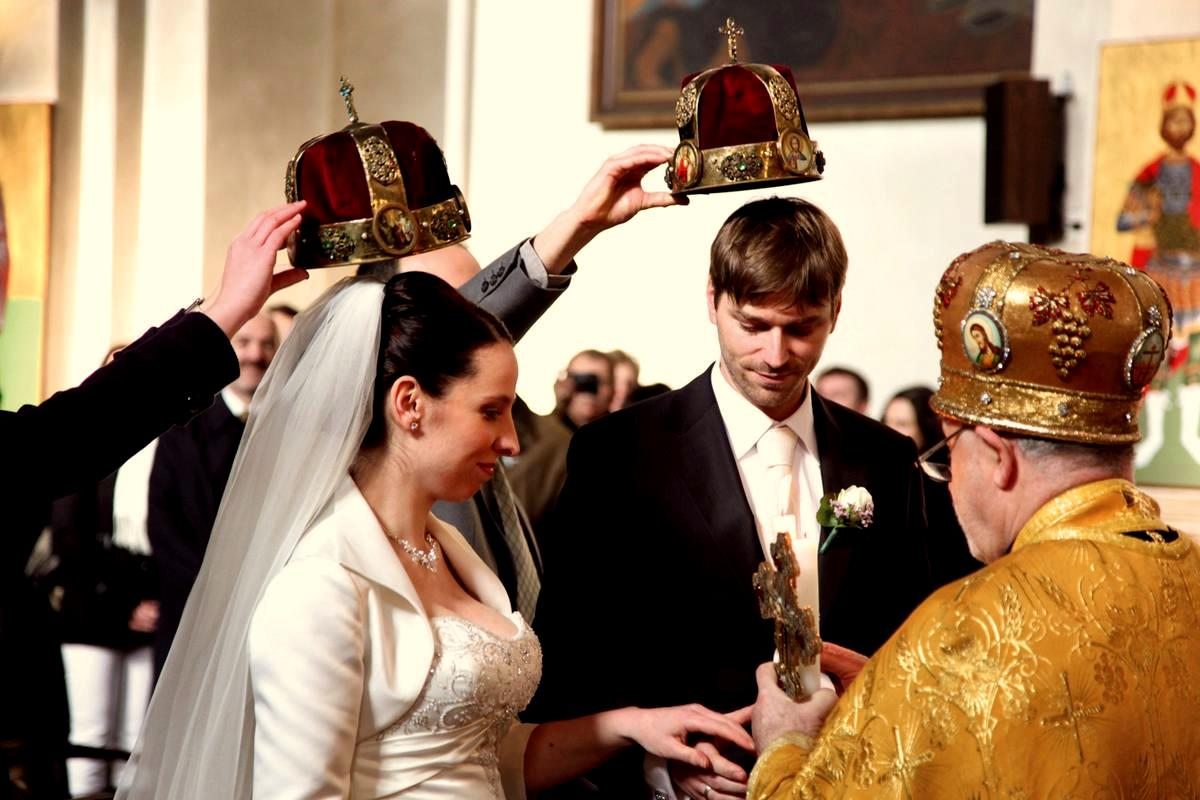
Orthodox wedding, Cathedral of Ss. Cyrill and Methodius, Prague, Czech Republic

From the beginning of the thirteenth century, the Church formally recognized marriage between a freely consenting, baptized man and woman as a sacrament—an outward sign communicating a special gift of God's love. The Council of Florence in 1438 gave this definition, following earlier Church statements in 1208, and declared that sexual union was a special participation in the union of Christ in the Church. However, the Puritans, while highly valuing the institution, viewed marriage as a "civil", rather than a "religious" matter, because they found no biblical precedent for clergy performing marriage ceremonies. Further, marriage was said to be for the "relief of concupiscence" as well as any spiritual purpose. During the Protestant Reformation, Martin Luther and John Calvin denied the sacramentality of marriage. This unanimity was broken at the 1930 Lambeth Conference, the quadrennial meeting of the worldwide Anglican Communion—creating divisions in that denomination.

Catholicism equates premarital sex with fornication and ties it with breaking the sixth commandment ("Thou shalt not commit adultery") in its Catechism. While sex before marriage was not a taboo in the Anglican Church until the Marriage Act 1753, which for the first time stipulated that everyone in England and Wales had to be married in their parish church" Prior to that time, "marriage began at the time of betrothal, when couples would live and sleep together... The process begun at the time of the Hardwicke Act continued throughout the 1800s, with stigma beginning to attach to illegitimacy."

The Hebrew Bible and its traditional interpretations in Judaism and Christianity have historically affirmed and endorsed a patriarchal and heteronormative approach towards human sexuality, favouring exclusively penetrative vaginal intercourse between men and women within the boundaries of marriage over all other forms of human sexual activity, including autoeroticism, masturbation, oral sex, non-penetrative and non-heterosexual sexual intercourse (all of which have been labeled as "sodomy" at various times). They have believed and taught that such behaviors are forbidden because they are considered sinful, and further compared to or derived from the behavior of the alleged residents of Sodom and Gomorrah.

=== Roman Empire ===
Social structures in the Roman Empire held that women were inferior to men intellectually and physically and were "naturally dependent". Athenian women were legally classified as children regardless of age and were the "legal property of some man at all stages in her life." Women in the Roman Empire had limited legal rights and could not enter professions. Female infanticide and abortion were practiced by all classes. In family life, men could have "lovers, prostitutes and concubines" but wives who engaged in extramarital affairs were considered guilty of adultery. It was not rare for pagan women to be married before the age of puberty and then forced to consummate the marriage with her often much older husband. Husbands could divorce their wives at any time simply by telling the wife to leave; wives did not have a similar ability to divorce their husbands.

Early Church Fathers advocated against polygamy, abortion, infanticide, child abuse, homosexuality, transvestism, and incest. After the Roman Empire adopted Christianity as the official religion, however, the link between Christian teachings and Roman family laws became more clear.

For example, Church teaching heavily influenced the legal concept of marriage. During the Gregorian Reform, the Church developed and codified a view of marriage as a sacrament. In a departure from societal norms, Church law required the consent of both parties before a marriage could be performed and established a minimum age for marriage. The elevation of marriage to a sacrament also made the union a binding contract, with dissolutions overseen by Church authorities. Although the Church abandoned tradition to allow women the same rights as men to dissolve a marriage, in practice, when an accusation of infidelity was made, men were granted dissolutions more frequently than women.

=== Medieval period ===
According to historian Shulamith Shahar, "[s]ome historians hold that the Church played a considerable part in fostering the inferior status of women in medieval society in general" by providing a "moral justification" for male superiority and by accepting practices such as wife-beating. "The ecclesiastical conception of the inferior status of women, deriving from Creation, her role in Original Sin and her subjugation to man, provided both direct and indirect justification for her inferior standing in the family and in society in medieval civilization. It was not the Church which induced husbands to beat their wives, but it not only accepted this custom after the event, if it was not carried to excess, but, by proclaiming the superiority of man, also supplied its moral justification." Despite these laws, some women, particularly abbesses, gained powers that were never available to women in previous Roman or Germanic societies.

Although these teachings emboldened secular authorities to give women fewer rights than men, they also helped form the concept of chivalry. Chivalry was influenced by a new Church attitude towards Mary, the mother of Jesus. This "ambivalence about women's very nature" was shared by most major religions in the Western world.

=== Family relations ===
Christian family saying grace before eating

Christian culture puts notable emphasis on the family, and according to the work of scholars Max Weber, Alan Macfarlane, Steven Ozment, Jack Goody and Peter Laslett, the huge transformation that led to modern marriage in Western democracies was "fueled by the religio-cultural value system provided by elements of Judaism, early Christianity, Roman Catholic canon law and the Protestant Reformation". Historically, extended families were the basic family unit in the Catholic culture and countries. According to a study by the scholar Joseph Henrich from Harvard University, the Catholic church "changed extended family ties, as well as values and psychology of individuals in the Western world".

Most Christian denominations practice infant baptism to enter children into the faith. Some form of confirmation ritual occurs when the child has reached the age of reason and voluntarily accepts the religion. Ritual circumcision is used to mark Coptic Christian, Ethiopian Orthodox Christian and Eritrean Orthodox infant males as belonging to the faith. Circumcision is practiced among many Christian countries and communities; Christian communities in Africa, the Anglosphere countries, the Philippines, the Middle East, South Korea and Oceania have high circumcision rates, while Christian communities in Europe and South America have low circumcision rates.

During the early period of capitalism, the rise of a large, commercial middle class, mainly in the Protestant countries of Holland and England, brought about a new family ideology centred around the upbringing of children. Puritanism stressed the importance of individual salvation and concern for the spiritual welfare of children. It became widely recognized that children possess rights on their own behalf. This included the rights of poor children to sustenance, membership in a community, education, and job training. The Poor Relief Acts in Elizabethan England put responsibility on each Parish to care for all the poor children in the area. And prior to the 20th century, three major branches of Christianity—Catholicism, Orthodoxy and Protestantism—as well as leading Protestant reformers Martin Luther and John Calvin generally held a critical perspective of birth control.

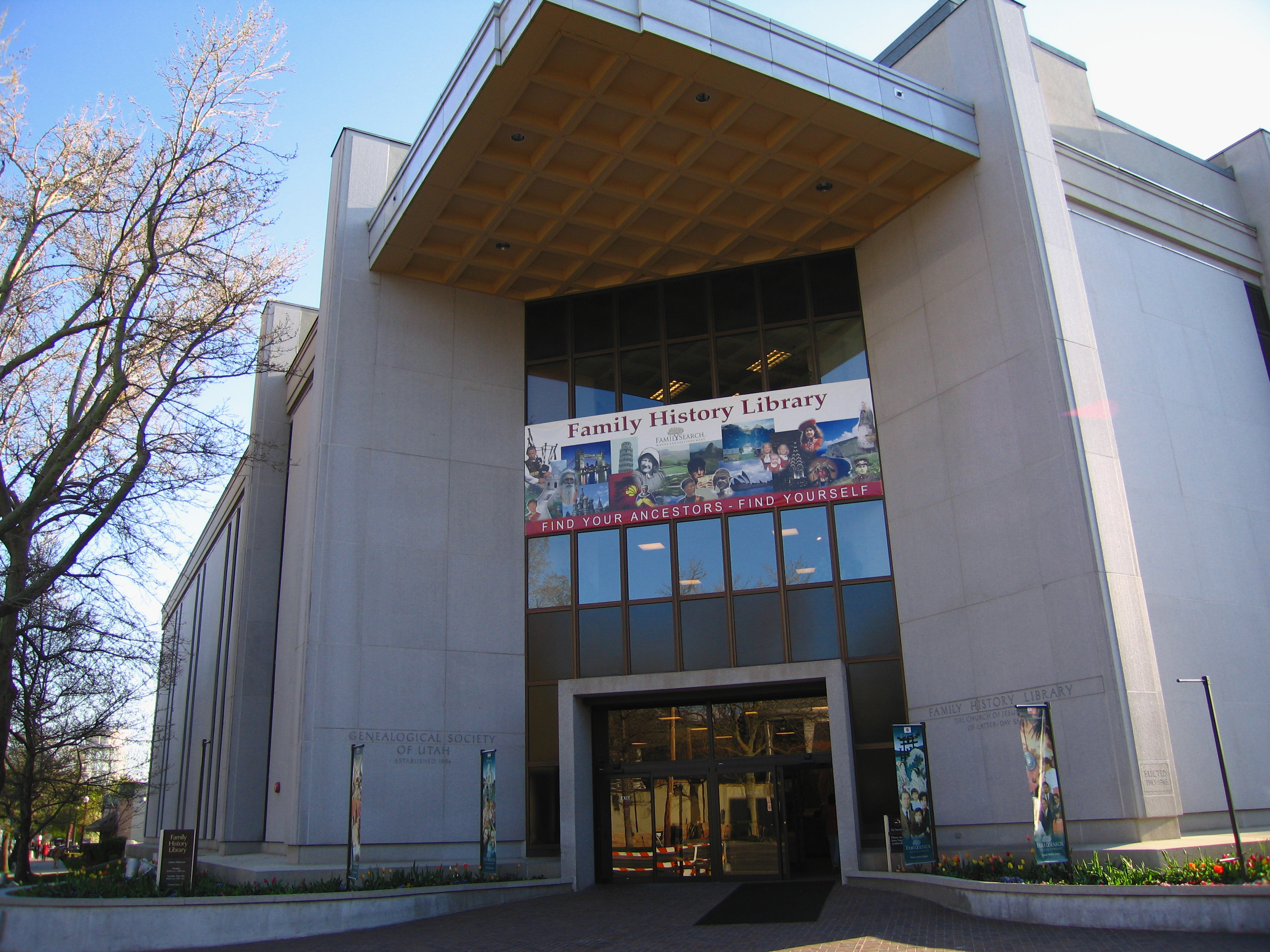
The LDS church's Family History Library is the world's largest library dedicated to genealogical research.

The Church of Jesus Christ of Latter-day Saints puts notable emphasis on the family, and the distinctive concept of a united family which lives and progresses forever is at the core of Latter-day Saint doctrine. Church members are encouraged to marry and have children, and as a result, Latter-day Saint families tend to be larger than average. All sexual activity outside of marriage is considered a serious sin. All homosexual activity is considered sinful and same-sex marriages are not performed or supported by the LDS Church. Latter-day Saint fathers who hold the priesthood typically name and bless their children shortly after birth to formally give the child a name and generate a church record for them. Mormons tend to be very family-oriented and have strong connections across generations and with extended family, reflective of their belief that families can be sealed together beyond death. In the temple, husbands and wives are sealed to each other for eternity. The implication is that other institutional forms, including the church, might disappear, but the family will endure. A 2011 survey of Mormons in the United States showed that family life is very important to Mormons, with family concerns significantly higher than career concerns. Four out of five Mormons believe that being a good parent is one of the most important goals in life, and roughly three out of four Mormons put having a successful marriage in this category. Mormons also have a strict law of chastity, requiring abstention from sexual relations outside heterosexual marriage and fidelity within marriage.

A Pew Center study about Religion and Living arrangements around the world in 2019, found that Christians around the world live in somewhat smaller households, on average, than non-Christians (4.5 vs. 5.1 members). 34% of world's Christian population live in two parent families with minor children, while 29% live in household with extended families, 11% live as couples without other family members, 9% live in household with least one child over the age of 18 with one or two parents, 7% live alone, and 6% live in single parent households. Christians in Asia and Pacific, Latin America and the Caribbean, Middle East and North Africa, and in Sub-Saharan Africa, overwhelmingly live in extended or two parent families with minor children. While more Christians in Europe and North America live alone or as couples without other family members.

=== Clerical marriage ===
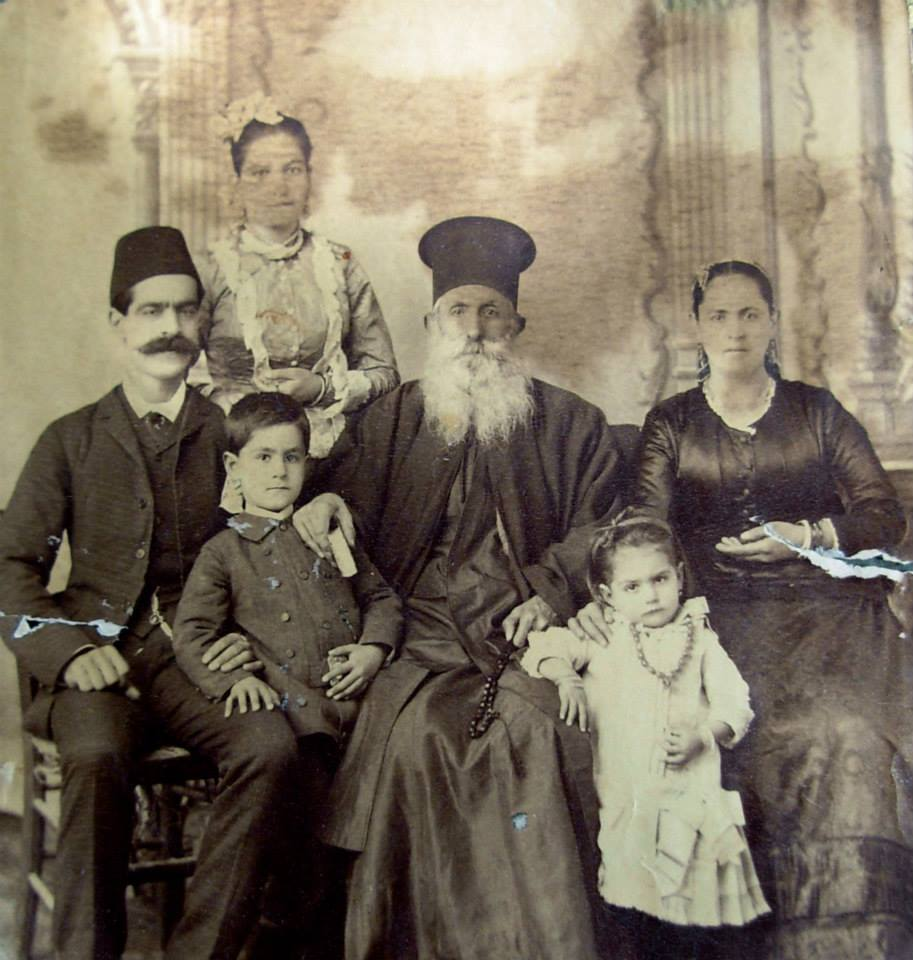
Married Eastern Orthodox priest from Jerusalem with his family (three generations), c. 1893

Clerical marriage is admitted among Protestants, including both Anglicans and Lutherans. Some Protestant clergy and their children have played an essential role in literature, philosophy, science, and education in Early Modern Europe.

Many Eastern Churches (Assyrian Church of the East, Eastern Orthodox, Oriental Orthodox, or Eastern Catholic), while allowing married men to be ordained, do not allow clerical marriage after ordination: their parish priests are often married, but must marry before being ordained to the priesthood. Within the lands of the Eastern Christendom, priests' children often became priests and married within their social group, establishing a tightly-knit hereditary caste among some Eastern Christian communities.

The Catholic Church not only forbids clerical marriage, but generally follows a practice of clerical celibacy, requiring candidates for ordination to be unmarried or widowed. However, this public policy in the Catholic Church has not always been enforced in private.

== Slavery ==
The Church initially accepted slavery as part of the Greco-Roman social fabric of society, campaigning primarily for humane treatment of slaves but also admonishing slaves to behave appropriately towards their masters. Historian Glenn Sunshine says, "Christians were the first people in history to oppose slavery systematically. Early Christians purchased slaves in the markets simply to set them free. Later, in the seventh century, the Franks..., under the influence of its Christian queen, Bathilde, became the first kingdom in history to begin the process of outlawing slavery. ...In the 1200s, Thomas Aquinas declared slavery a sin. When the African slave trade began in the 1400s, it was condemned numerous times by the papacy."

During the early medieval period, Christians tolerated enslavement of non-Christians. By the end of the medieval period, enslavement of Christians had been mitigated somewhat with the spread of serfdom within Europe, though outright slavery existed in European colonies in other parts of the world. Several popes issued papal bulls condemning mistreatment of enslaved Native Americans; these were largely ignored. In his 1839 bull In supremo apostolatus, Pope Gregory XVI condemned all forms of slavery; nevertheless some American bishops continued to support slavery for several decades. In this historic Bull, Pope Gregory outlined his summation of the impact of the Church on the ancient institution of slavery, beginning by acknowledging that early Apostles had tolerated slavery but had called on masters to "act well towards their slaves... knowing that the common Master both of themselves and of the slaves is in Heaven, and that with Him there is no distinction of persons". Gregory continued to discuss the involvement of Christians for and against slavery through the ages:

In the process of time, the fog of pagan superstition being more completely dissipated and the manners of barbarous people having been softened, thanks to Faith operating by Charity, it at last comes about that, since several centuries, there are no more slaves in the greater number of Christian nations. But – We say with profound sorrow – there were to be found afterwards among the Faithful men who, shamefully blinded by the desire of sordid gain, in lonely and distant countries, did not hesitate to reduce to slavery Indians, negroes and other wretched peoples, or else, by instituting or developing the trade in those who had been made slaves by others, to favour their unworthy practice. Certainly many Roman Pontiffs of glorious memory, Our Predecessors, did not fail, according to the duties of their charge, to blame severely this way of acting as dangerous for the spiritual welfare of those engaged in the traffic and a shame to the Christian name; they foresaw that as a result of this, the infidel peoples would be more and more strengthened in their hatred of the true Religion.

=== Latin America ===
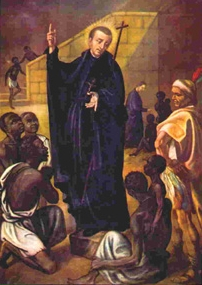
St. Peter Claver worked for the alleviation of the suffering of African slaves brought to South America.

It was women, primarily Amerindian Christian converts who became the primary supporters of the Latin American Church. While the Spanish military was known for its ill-treatment of Amerindian men and women, Catholic missionaries are credited with championing all efforts to initiate protective laws for the Indians and fought against their enslavement. This began within 20 years of the discovery of the New World by Europeans in 1492 – in December 1511, Antonio de Montesinos, a Dominican friar, openly rebuked the Spanish rulers of Hispaniola for their "cruelty and tyranny" in dealing with the American natives. King Ferdinand enacted the Laws of Burgos and Valladolid in response. The issue resulted in a crisis of conscience in 16th-century Spain. Further abuses against the Amerindians committed by Spanish authorities were denounced by Catholic missionaries such as Bartolomé de Las Casas and Francisco de Vitoria which led to debate on the nature of human rights and the birth of modern international law. Enforcement of these laws was lax, and some historians blame the Church for not doing enough to liberate the Indians; others point to the Church as the only voice raised on behalf of indigenous peoples.

Slavery and human sacrifice were both part of Latin American culture before the Europeans arrived. Indian slavery was first abolished by Pope Paul III in the 1537 bull Sublimis Deus. While these edicts may have had some beneficial effects, these were limited in scope. European colonies were mainly run by military and royally appointed administrators, who seldom stopped to consider church teachings when forming policy or enforcing their rule. Even after independence, institutionalized prejudice and injustice toward indigenous people continued well into the twentieth century. This has led to the formation of a number of movements to reassert indigenous peoples' civil rights and culture in modern nation-states.

A catastrophe was wrought upon the Amerindians by contact with Europeans. Old World diseases like smallpox, measles, malaria and many others spread through Indian populations. "In most of the New World 90 percent or more of the native population was destroyed by wave after wave of previously unknown afflictions. Explorers and colonists did not enter an empty land but rather an emptied one".

=== Africa ===
Slavery and the slave trade were part of African societies and states which supplied the Arab world with slaves before the arrival of the Europeans. Several decades prior to discovery of the New World, in response to serious military threat to Europe posed by Muslims of the Ottoman Empire, Pope Nicholas V had granted Portugal the right to subdue Muslims, pagans and other unbelievers in the papal bull Dum Diversas (1452). Six years after African slavery was first outlawed by the first major entity to do so, (Great Britain in 1833), Pope Gregory XVI followed in a challenge to Spanish and Portuguese policy, by condemning slavery and the slave trade in the 1839 papal bull In supremo apostolatus, and approved the ordination of native clergy in the face of government racism. The United States would eventually outlaw African slavery in 1865, and Brazil in 1888.

Clapham Sect were a group of social reformers associated with Clapham in the period from the 1780s to the 1840s. Despite the label "sect", most members remained in the established (and dominant) Church of England, which was highly interwoven with offices of state. However, its successors were in many cases outside of the established Anglican Church.

By the close of the 19th century, European powers had managed to gain control of most of the African interior. The new rulers introduced cash-based economies which created an enormous demand for literacy and a western education—a demand which for most Africans could only be satisfied by Christian missionaries. Catholic missionaries followed colonial governments into Africa, and built schools, hospitals, monasteries and churches.

== Letters and learning ==
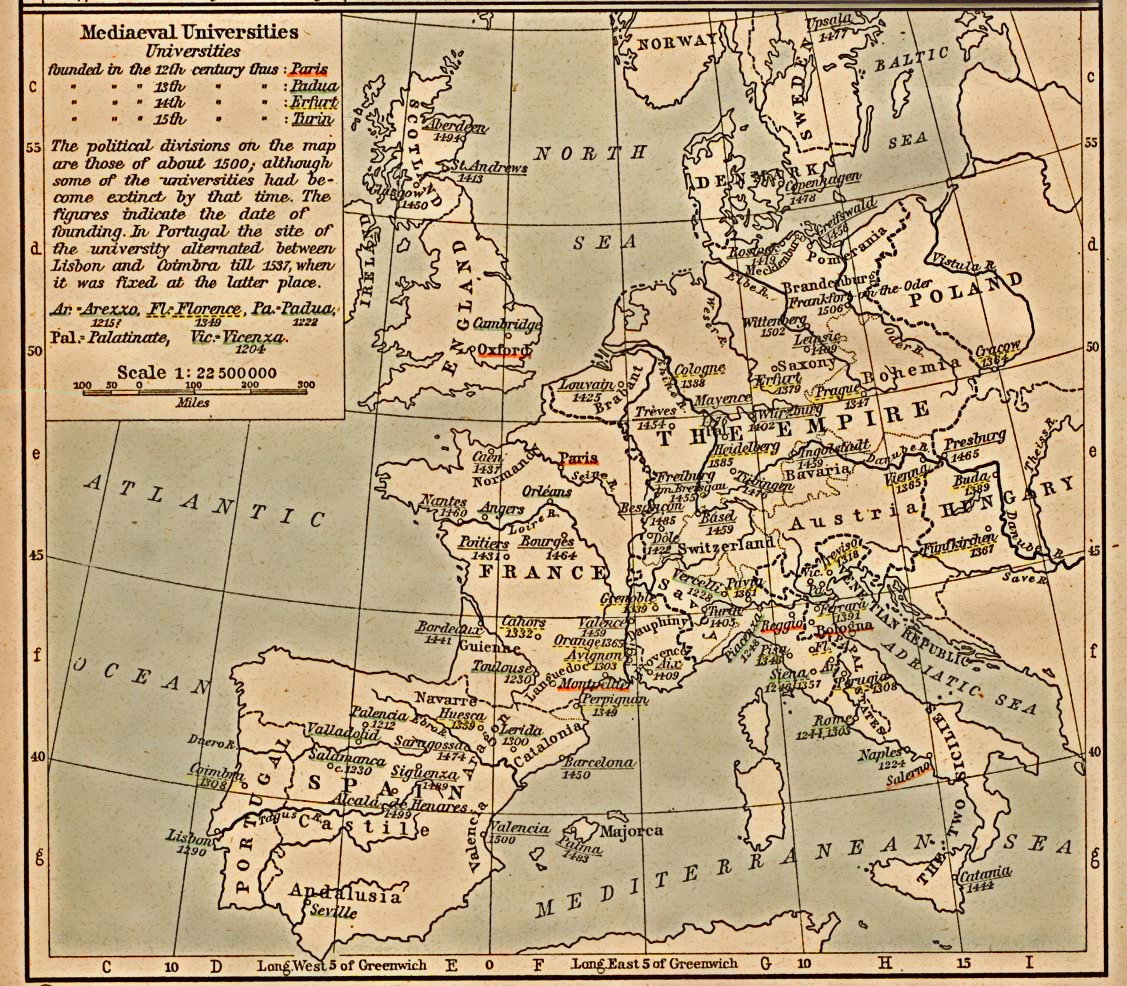
Map of mediaeval universities established by Catholic students, faculty, monarchs, or priests

The influence of the Church on Western letters and learning has been formidable. The ancient texts of the Bible have deeply influenced Western art, literature and culture. For centuries following the collapse of the Western Roman Empire, small monastic communities were practically the only outposts of literacy in Western Europe. In time, the Cathedral schools developed into Europe's earliest universities and the church has established thousands of primary, secondary and tertiary institutions throughout the world in the centuries since. The Church and clergymen have also sought at different times to censor texts and scholars. Thus different schools of opinion exist as to the role and influence of the Church in relation to western letters and learning.

One view, first propounded by Enlightenment philosophers, asserts that the Church's doctrines are entirely superstitious and have hindered the progress of civilization. Communist states have made similar arguments in their education in order to inculcate a negative view of Catholicism (and religion in general) in their citizens. The most famous incidents cited by such critics are the Church's condemnations of the teachings of Copernicus, Galileo Galilei and Johannes Kepler. Events in Christian Europe, such as the Galileo affair, that were associated with the Scientific Revolution and the Age of Enlightenment led some scholars such as John William Draper to postulate a conflict thesis, holding that religion and science have been in conflict throughout history. While the conflict thesis remains popular in atheistic and antireligious circles, it has lost favor among most contemporary historians of science.

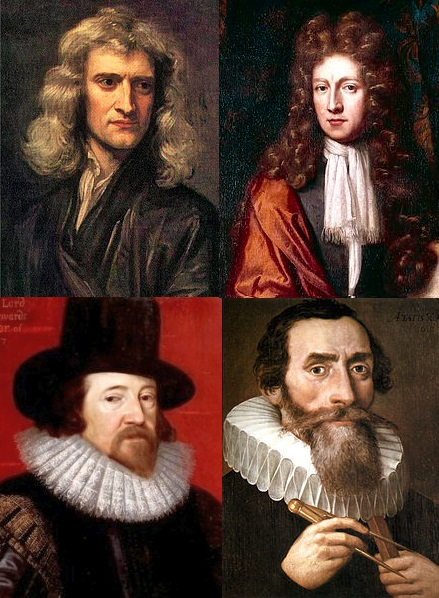
Set of pictures for a number of notable scientists self-identified as Christians: Isaac Newton, Robert Boyle, Francis Bacon and Johannes Kepler

In opposition to this view, some historians of science, including non-Catholics such as J.L. Heilbron, A.C. Crombie, David Lindberg, Edward Grant, historian of science Thomas Goldstein, and Ted Davis, have argued that the Church had a significant, positive influence on the development of Western civilization. They hold that, not only did monks save and cultivate the remnants of ancient civilization during the barbarian invasions, but that the Church promoted learning and science through its sponsorship of many universities which, under its leadership, grew rapidly in Europe in the 11th and 12th centuries. Copernicus, Galileo Galilei, and Johannes Kepler all considered themselves Christian. St.Thomas Aquinas, the Church's "model theologian", argued that reason is in harmony with faith, and that reason can contribute to a deeper understanding of revelation, and so encouraged intellectual development. The Church's priest-scientists, many of whom were Jesuits, have been among the leading lights in astronomy, genetics, geomagnetism, meteorology, seismology, and solar physics, becoming some of the "fathers" of these sciences. Examples include important churchmen such as the Augustinian abbot Gregor Mendel (pioneer in the study of genetics), the monk William of Ockham who developed Ockham's Razor, Roger Bacon (a Franciscan friar who was one of the early advocates of the scientific method), and Belgian priest Georges Lemaître (the first to propose the Big Bang theory). Other notable priest scientists have included Albertus Magnus, Robert Grosseteste, Nicholas Steno, Francesco Grimaldi, Giambattista Riccioli, Roger Boscovich, and Athanasius Kircher. Even more numerous are Catholic laity involved in science:Henri Becquerel who discovered radioactivity; Galvani, Volta, Ampere, Marconi, pioneers in electricity and telecommunications; Lavoisier, "father of modern chemistry"; Vesalius, founder of modern human anatomy; and Cauchy, one of the mathematicians who laid the rigorous foundations of calculus.

Most contemporary historians of science agree that Galileo affair as an exception, with the relationship between science and Christianity, and have corrected numerous false interpretations of the affair. Professor Noah J Efron says that "Generations of historians and sociologists have discovered many ways in which Christians, Christian beliefs, and Christian institutions played crucial roles in fashioning the tenets, methods, and institutions of what in time became modern science. They found that some forms of Christianity provided the motivation to study nature systematically..." Virtually all modern scholars and historians agree that Christianity moved many early-modern intellectuals to study nature systematically.

Christian scholars and scientists have made noted contributions to science and technology fields, as well as medicine, both historically and in modern times. Many well-known historical figures who influenced Western science considered themselves Christian such as Copernicus, Galileo, Kepler, Newton and Boyle. Some scholars and historians attributes Christianity to having contributed to the rise of the Scientific Revolution.

According to 100 Years of Nobel Prize (2005), a review of Nobel prizes awarded between 1901 and 2000, 65.4% of Nobel Prize Laureates, have identified Christianity in its various forms as their religious preference (423 prizes). Overall, Christians have won a total of 78.3% of all the Nobel Prizes in Peace, 72.5% in Chemistry, 65.3% in Physics, 62% in Medicine, 54% in Economics and 49.5% of all Literature awards.

=== Antiquity ===
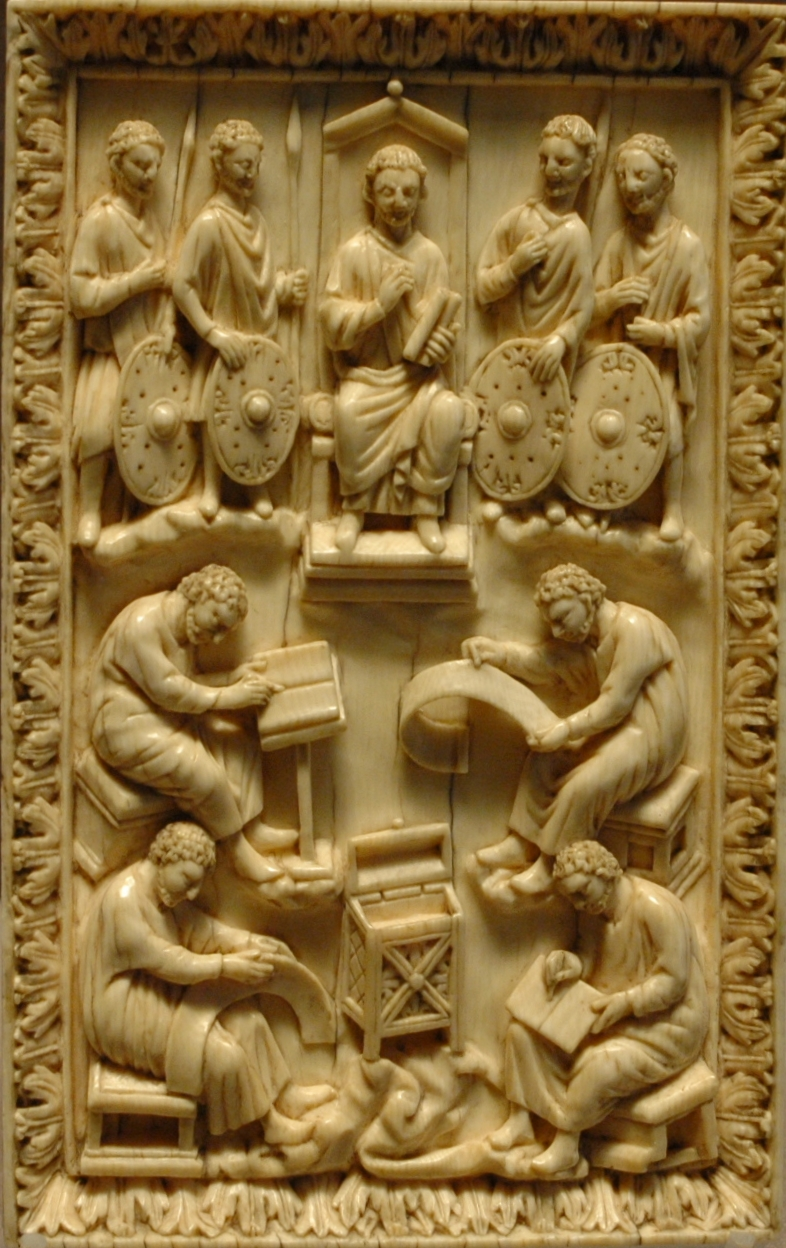
David dictating the Psalms, end of the 10th century–11th century.

Christianity began as a Jewish sect in the 1st century AD, and from the teachings of Jesus of Nazareth and his early followers. Jesus learned the texts of the Hebrew Bible and became an influential wandering preacher. Accounts of his life and teachings appear in the New Testament of the Bible, one of the bedrock texts of Western Civilization. His orations, including the Sermon on the Mount, The Good Samaritan and his declaration against hypocrisy "Let he who is without sin cast the first stone" have been deeply influential in Western literature. Many translations of the Bible exist, including the King James Bible, which is one of the most admired texts in English literature. The poetic Psalms and other passages of the Hebrew Bible have also been deeply influential in Western Literature and thought. Accounts of the actions of Jesus' early followers are contained within the Acts of the Apostles and Epistles written between the early Christian communities – in particular the Pauline epistles which are among the earliest extant Christian documents and foundational texts of Christian theology.

After the death of Jesus, the new sect grew to be the dominant religion of the Roman Empire and the long tradition of Christian scholarship began. When the Western Roman Empire was starting to disintegrate, St Augustine was Bishop of Hippo Regius. He was a Latin-speaking philosopher and theologian who lived in the Roman Africa Province. His writings were very influential in the development of Western Christianity and he developed the concept of the Church as a spiritual City of God (in a book of the same name), distinct from the material Earthly City. His book Confessions, which outlines his sinful youth and conversion to Christianity, is widely considered to be the first autobiography of ever written in the canon of Western Literature. Augustine profoundly influenced the coming medieval worldview.

=== Byzantine Empire ===
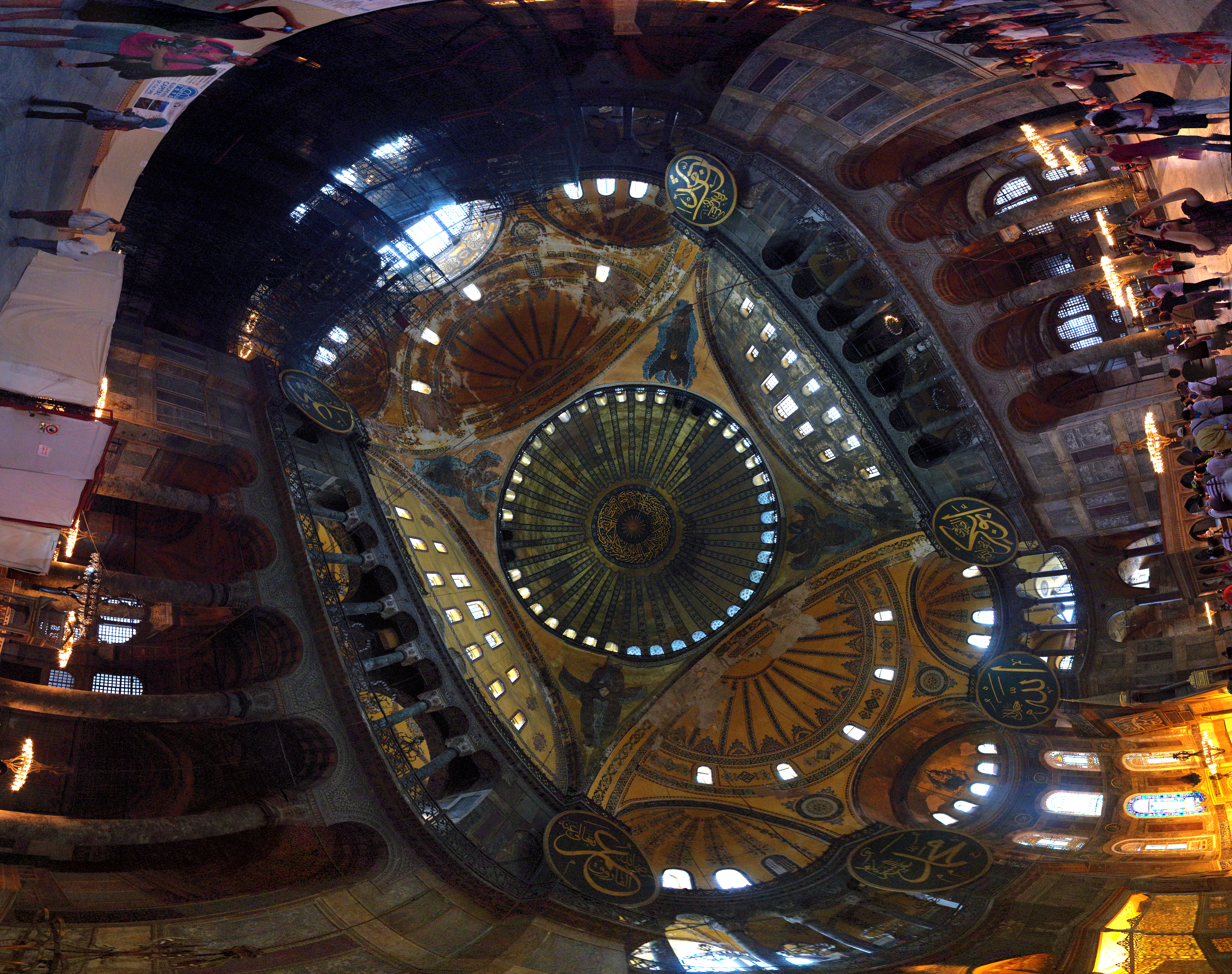
Interior panorama of the Hagia Sophia, the patriarchal basilica in Constantinople designed 537 AD by Isidore of Miletus, the first compiler of Archimedes' various works. The influence of Archimedes' principles of solid geometry is evident.

The Byzantine Empire was one of the peaks in Christian history and Christian civilization, and Constantinople remained the leading city of the Christian world in size, wealth, and culture. There was a renewed interest in classical Greek philosophy, as well as an increase in literary output in vernacular Greek.

The Byzantine science played an important role in the transmission of classical knowledge to the Islamic world and to Renaissance Italy, and also in the transmission of Islamic science to Renaissance Italy. Many of the most distinguished classical scholars held high office in the Eastern Orthodox Church.

The Imperial University of Constantinople sometimes known as the University of the Palace Hall of Magnaura (Greek: Πανδιδακτήριον τῆς Μαγναύρας), was an Eastern Roman educational institution that could trace its corporate origins to 425 AD, when the emperor Theodosius II founded the Pandidakterion (Medieval Greek: Πανδιδακτήριον). The Pandidakterion was refounded in 1046 by Constantine IX Monomachos who created the Departments of Law (Διδασκαλεῖον τῶν Νόμων) and Philosophy (Γυμνάσιον). At the time various economic schools, colleges, polytechnics, libraries and fine arts academies also operated in the city of Constantinople. And a few scholars have gone so far as to call the Pandidakterion the first "university" in the world.

The writings of Classical antiquity never ceased to be cultivated in Byzantium. Therefore, Byzantine science was in every period closely connected with ancient philosophy, and metaphysics. In the field of engineering Isidore of Miletus, the Greek mathematician and architect of the Hagia Sophia, produced the first compilation of Archimedes works c. 530, and it is through this tradition, kept alive by the school of mathematics and engineering founded c. 850 during the "Byzantine Renaissance" by Leo the Geometer that such works are known today (see Archimedes Palimpsest). Indeed, geometry and its applications (architecture and engineering instruments of war) remained a specialty of the Byzantines.

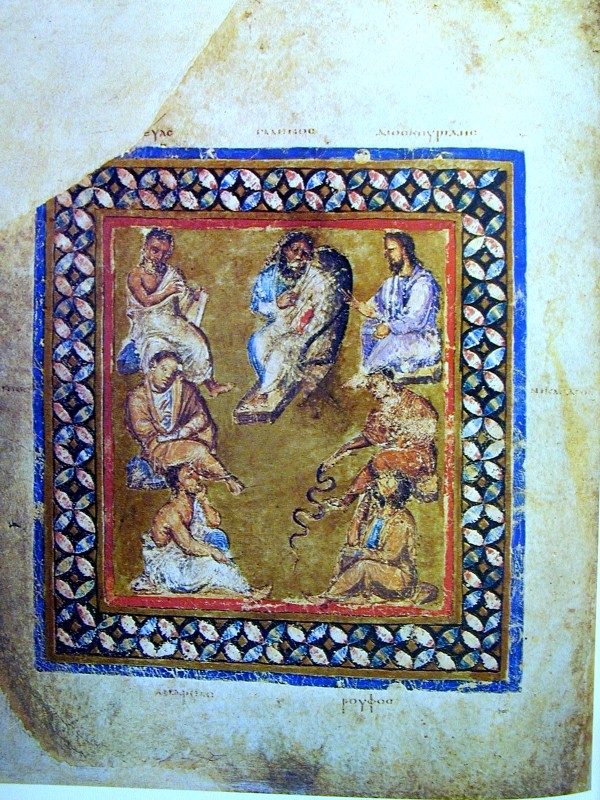
The frontispiece of the Vienna Dioscurides, which shows a set of seven famous physicians

Though scholarship lagged during the dark years following the Arab conquests, during the so-called Byzantine Renaissance at the end of the first millennium Byzantine scholars re-asserted themselves becoming experts in the scientific developments of the Arabs and Persians, particularly in astronomy and mathematics. The Byzantines are also credited with several technological advancements, particularly in architecture (e.g. the pendentive dome) and warfare technology (e.g. Greek fire).

Although at various times the Byzantines made magnificent achievements in the application of the sciences (notably in the construction of the Hagia Sophia), and although they preserved much of the ancient knowledge of science and geometry, after the 6th century Byzantine scholars made few novel contributions to science in terms of developing new theories or extending the ideas of classical authors.

In the final century of the Empire, Byzantine grammarians were those principally responsible for carrying, in person and in writing, ancient Greek grammatical and literary studies to early Renaissance Italy. During this period, astronomy and other mathematical sciences were taught in Trebizond; medicine attracted the interest of almost all scholars.

In the field of law, Justinian I's reforms had a clear effect on the evolution of jurisprudence, and Leo III's Ecloga influenced the formation of legal institutions in the Slavic world.

In the 10th century, Leo VI the Wise achieved the complete codification of the whole of Byzantine law in Greek, which became the foundation of all subsequent Byzantine law, generating interest to the present day.

=== Preservation of Classical learning ===
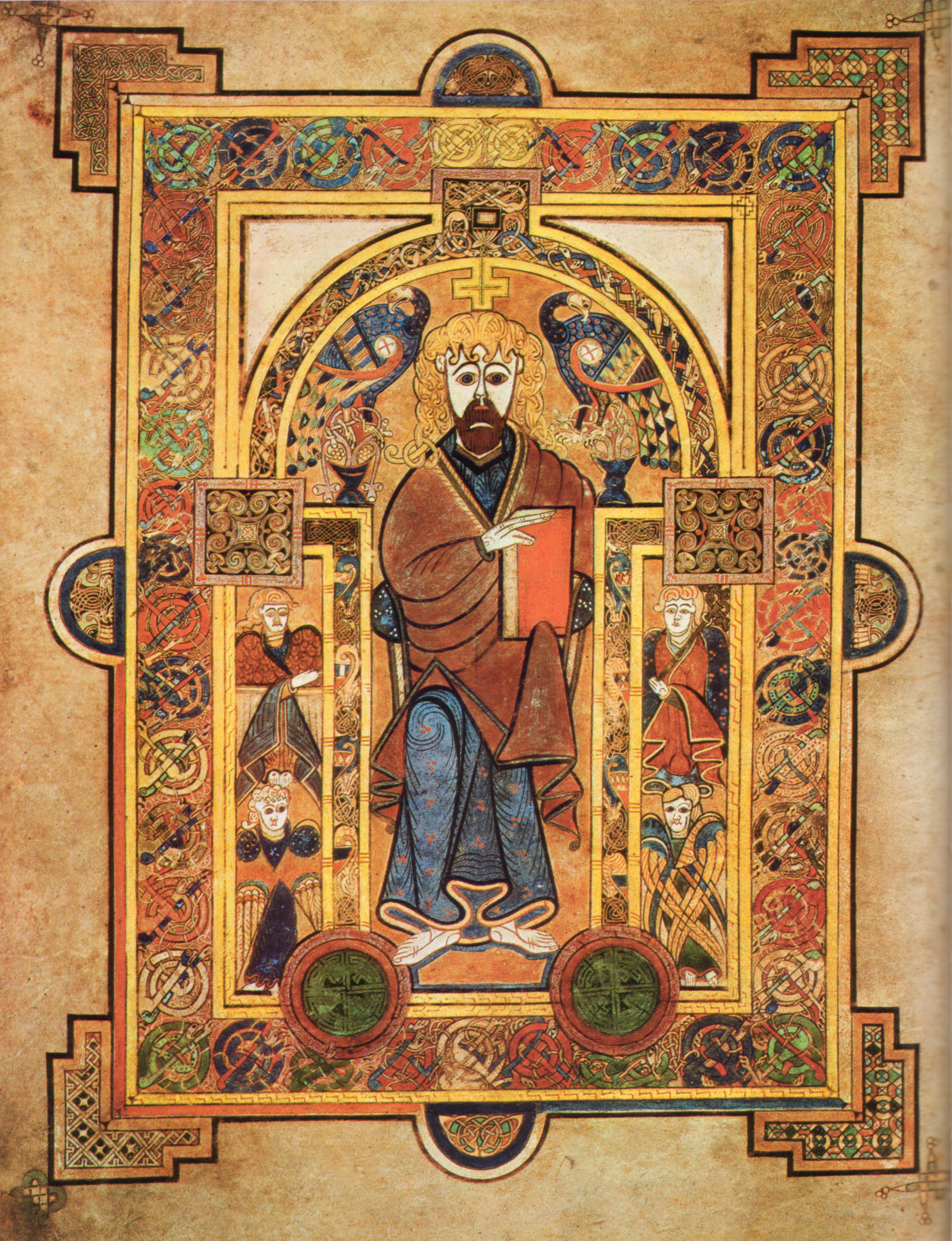
The Book of Kells. Celtic Church scholars did much to preserve the texts of ancient Europe through the Dark Ages.

During the period of European history often called the Dark Ages which followed the collapse of the Western Roman Empire, Church scholars and missionaries played a vital role in preserving knowledge of Classical Learning. While the Roman Empire and Christian religion survived in an increasingly Hellenised form in the Byzantine Empire centred at Constantinople in the East, Western civilisation suffered a collapse of literacy and organisation following the fall of Rome in 476AD. Monks sought refuge at the far fringes of the known world: like Cornwall, Ireland, or the Hebrides. Disciplined Christian scholarship carried on in isolated outposts like Skellig Michael in Ireland, where literate monks became some of the last preservers in Western Europe of the poetic and philosophical works of Western antiquity. By around 800AD they were producing illuminated manuscripts such as the Book of Kells, by which old learning was re-communicated to Western Europe. The Hiberno-Scottish mission led by Irish and Scottish monks like St Columba spread Christianity back into Western Europe during the Middle Ages, establishing monasteries through Anglo-Saxon England and the Frankish Empire during the Middle Ages.

Thomas Cahill, in his 1995 book How the Irish Saved Civilization, credited Irish Monks with having "saved" Western Civilization:

[A]s the Roman Empire fell, as all through Europe matted, unwashed barbarians descended on the Roman cities, looting artifacts and burning books, the Irish, who were just learning to read and write, took up the great labor of copying all western literature – everything they could lay their hands on. These scribes then served as conduits through which the Greco-Roman and Judeo-Christian cultures were transmitted to the tribes of Europe, newly settled amid the rubble and ruined vineyards of the civilization they had overwhelmed. Without this Service of the Scribes, everything that happened subsequently would be unthinkable. Without the Mission of the Irish Monks, who single-handedly re-founded European civilization throughout the continent in the bays and valleys of their exile, the world that came after them would have been an entirely different one-a world without books. And our own world would never have come to be.

According to art historian Kenneth Clark, for some five centuries after the fall of Rome, virtually all men of intellect joined the Church and practically nobody in western Europe outside of monastic settlements had the ability to read or write. While church scholars at different times also destroyed classical texts they felt were contrary to the Christian message, it was they, virtually alone in Western Europe, who preserved texts from the old society.

As Western Europe became more orderly again, the Church remained a driving force in education, setting up Cathedral schools beginning in the Early Middle Ages as centers of education, which became medieval universities, the springboard of many of Western Europe's later achievements.

Numbers written with Cistercian numerals. From left to right: 1 in units place, 2 in tens place (20), 3 in hundreds place (300), 4 in thousands place (4000), then compound numbers 5555, 6789, 9394.

The Catholic Cistercian order used its own numbering system, which could express numbers from 0 to 9999 in a single sign. According to one modern Cistercian, "enterprise and entrepreneurial spirit" have always been a part of the order's identity, and the Cistercians "were catalysts for development of a market economy" in 12th-century Europe. Until the Industrial Revolution, most of the technological advances in Europe were made in the monasteries. According to the medievalist Jean Gimpel, their high level of industrial technology facilitated the diffusion of new techniques: "Every monastery had a model factory, often as large as the church and only several feet away, and waterpower drove the machinery of the various industries located on its floor." Waterpower was used for crushing wheat, sieving flour, fulling cloth and tanning – a "level of technological achievement [that] could have been observed in practically all" of the Cistercian monasteries. The English science historian James Burke examines the impact of Cistercian waterpower, derived from Roman watermill technology such as that of Barbegal aqueduct and mill near Arles in the fourth of his ten-part Connections TV series, called "Faith in Numbers". The Cistercians made major contributions to culture and technology in medieval Europe: Cistercian architecture is considered one of the most beautiful styles of medieval architecture; and the Cistercians were the main force of technological diffusion in fields such as agriculture and hydraulic engineering.

=== Index Librorum Prohibitorum ===
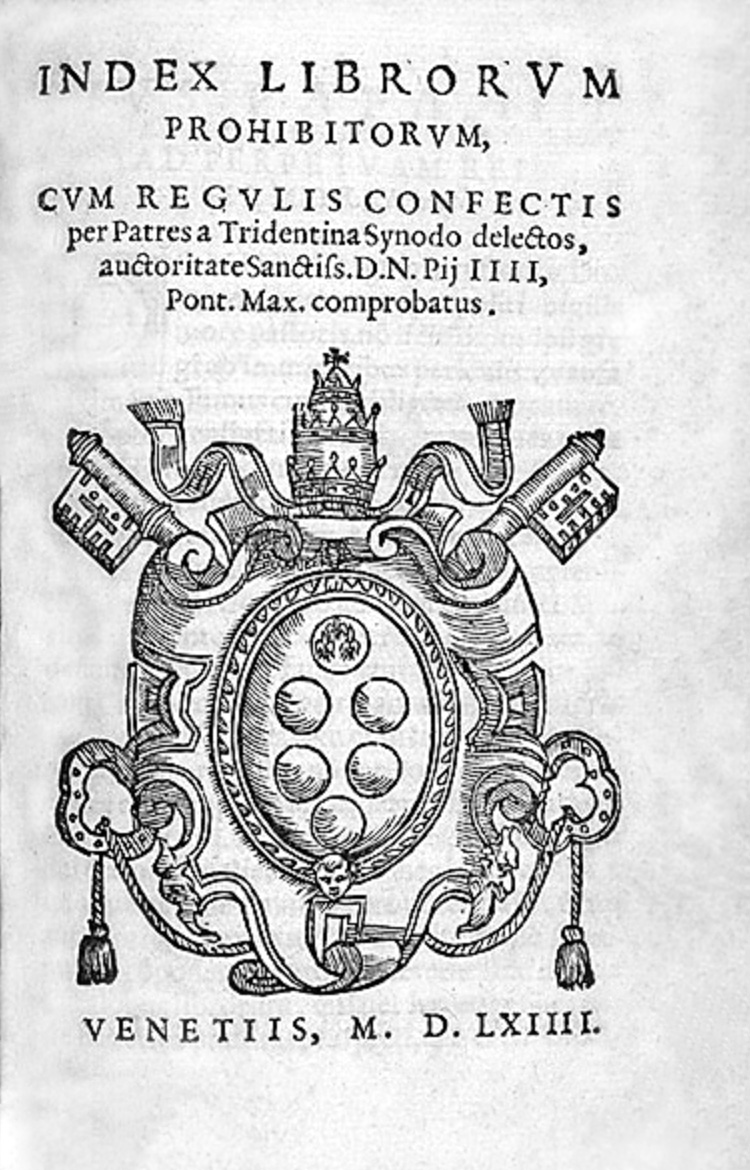
Title page of Index Librorum Prohibitorum (Venice 1564)

The Index Librorum Prohibitorum ("List of Prohibited Books") was a list of publications prohibited by the Catholic Church. While the promulgation of the Index has been described by some as the "turning-point in the freedom of enquiry" in the Catholic world, the actual effects of the Index were minimal and it was largely ignored.

The first Index was published in 1559 by the Sacred Congregation of the Roman Inquisition. The last edition of the Index appeared in 1948 and publication of the list ceased 1966.

The avowed aim of the list was to protect the faith and morals of the faithful by preventing the reading of immoral books or works containing theological errors. Books thought to contain such errors included some scientific works by leading astronomers such as Johannes Kepler's Epitome astronomiae Copernicianae, which was on the Index from 1621 to 1835. The various editions of the Index also contained the rules of the Church relating to the reading, selling and pre-emptive censorship of books.

Some of the scientific works that were on early editions of the Index (e.g. on heliocentrism) have long been routinely taught at Catholic universities worldwide. Giordano Bruno, whose works were on the Index, now has a monument in Rome, erected over the Church's objections at the place where he was burned alive at the stake for heresy.

=== Protestant role in science ===
According to the Merton Thesis there was a positive correlation between the rise of puritanism and protestant pietism on the one hand and early experimental science on the other. The Merton Thesis has two separate parts: Firstly, it presents a theory that science changes due to an accumulation of observations and improvement in experimental techniques and methodology; secondly, it puts forward the argument that the popularity of science in 17th-century England and the religious demography of the Royal Society (English scientists of that time were predominantly Puritans or other Protestants) can be explained by a correlation between Protestantism and the scientific values. In his theory, Robert K. Merton focused on English Puritanism and German Pietism as having been responsible for the development of the Scientific Revolution of the 17th and 18th centuries. Merton explained that the connection between religious affiliation and interest in science was the result of a significant synergy between the ascetic Protestant values and those of modern science. Protestant values encouraged scientific research by allowing science to study God's influence on the world and thus providing a religious justification for scientific research.

=== Astronomy ===
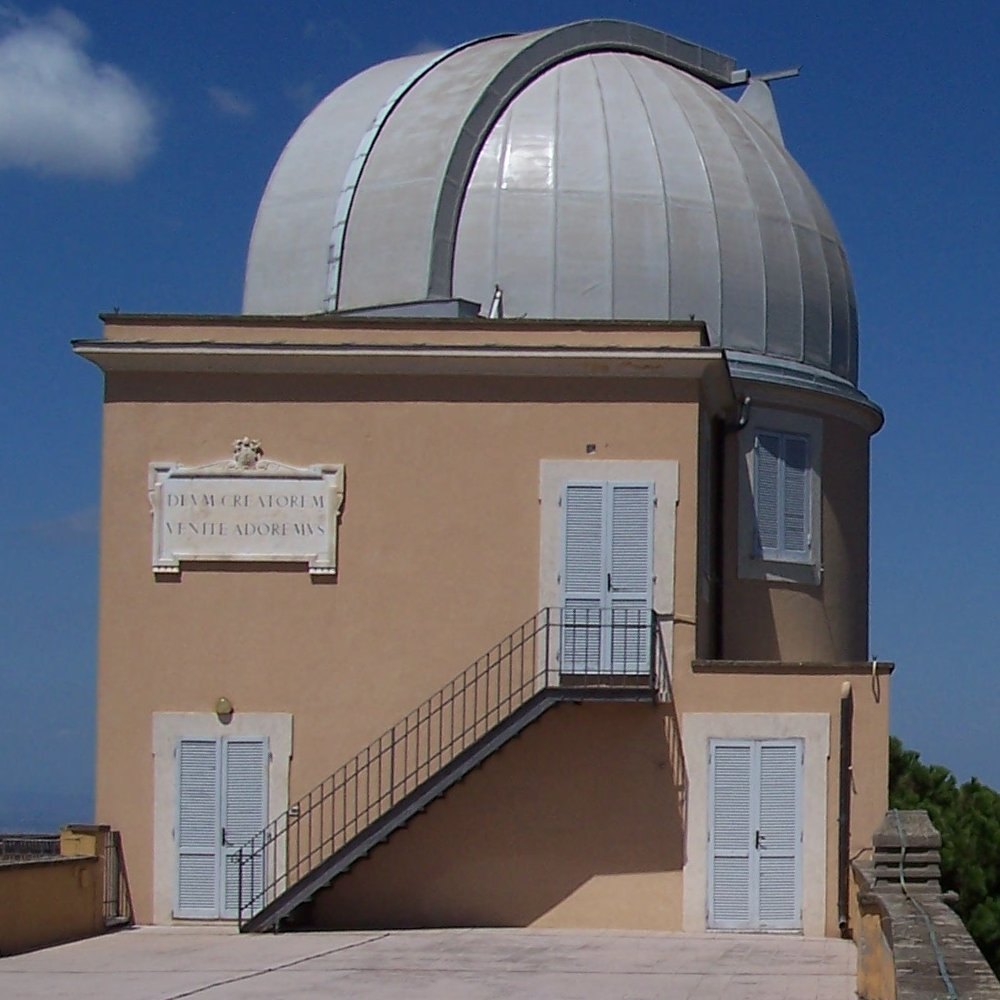
Vatican Observatory Telescope in Castel Gandolfo

Historically, the Catholic Church has been a major a sponsor of astronomy, not least due to the astronomical basis of the calendar by which holy days and Easter are determined. Nevertheless, the most famous case of a scientist being tried for heresy arose in this field of science: the trial of Galileo.

The Church's interest in astronomy began with purely practical concerns, when in the 16th century Pope Gregory XIII required astronomers to correct for the fact that the Julian calendar had fallen out of sync with the sky. Since the Spring equinox was tied to the celebration of Easter, the Church considered that this steady movement in the date of the equinox was undesirable. The resulting Gregorian calendar is the internationally accepted civil calendar used throughout the world today and is an important contribution of the Catholic Church to Western Civilisation. It was introduced by Pope Gregory XIII, after whom the calendar was named, by a decree signed on 24 February 1582. In 1789, the Vatican Observatory opened. It was moved to Castel Gandolfo in the 1930s and the Vatican Advanced Technology Telescope began making observation in Arizona, US, in 1995.

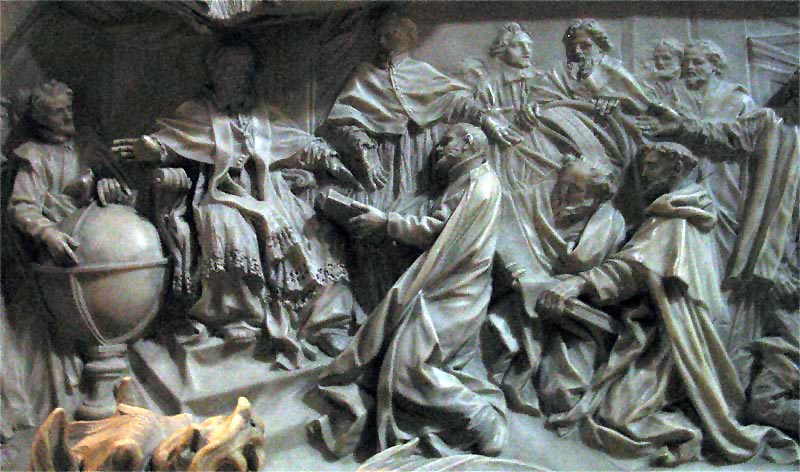
Detail of the tomb of Pope Gregory XIII celebrating the introduction of the Gregorian Calendar

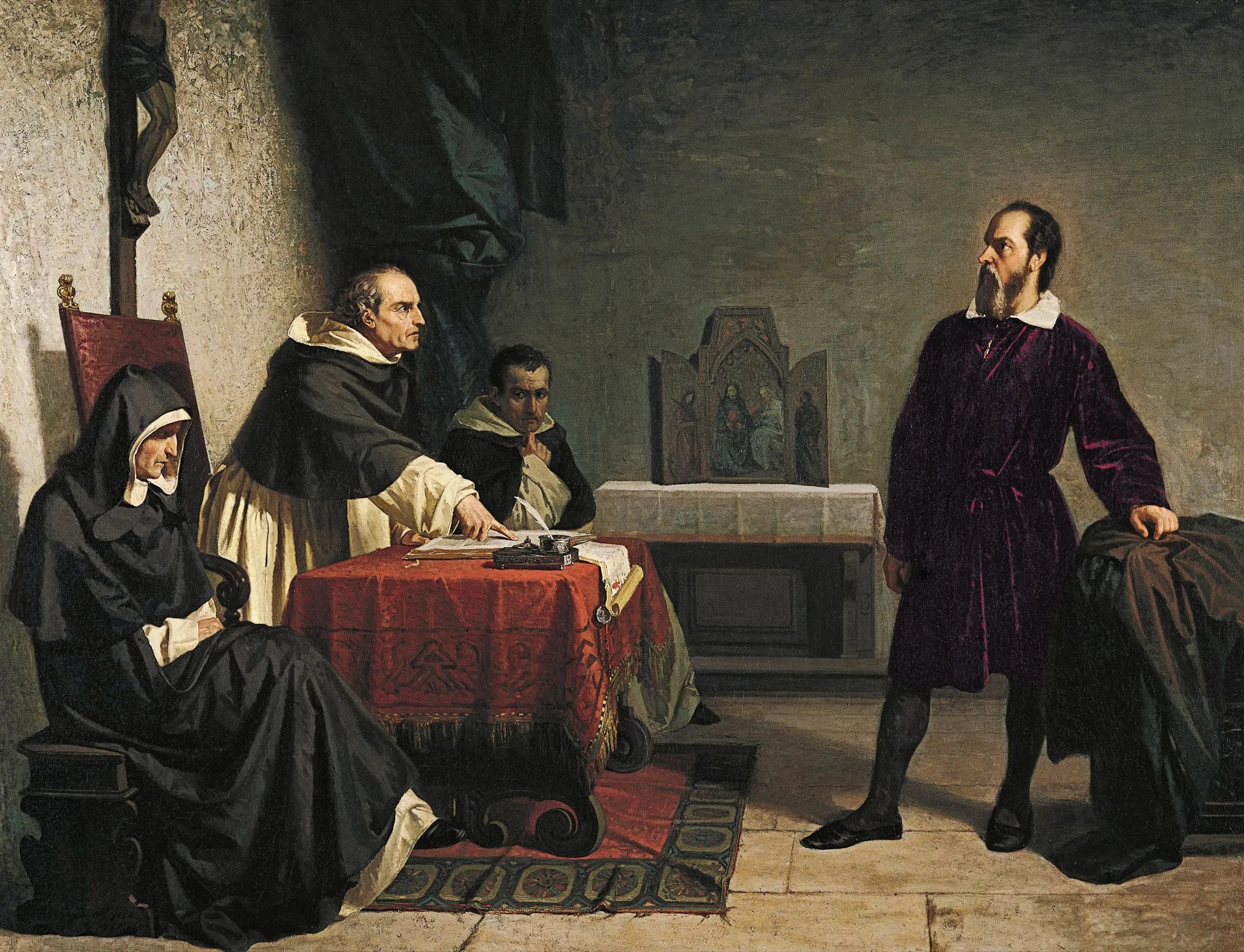
Galileo facing the Roman Inquisition by Cristiano Banti (1857)

The famous astronomers Nicholas Copernicus, who put the Sun at the centre of the heavens in 1543, and Galileo Galilei, who experimented with the new technology of the telescope and, with its aid declared his belief that Copernicus was correct, were both practising Catholics – indeed Copernicus was a Catholic clergyman. Yet the church establishment at that time held to theories devised in pre-Christian Greece by Ptolemy and Aristotle, which said that the sky revolved around the Earth. When Galileo began to assert that the Earth in fact revolved around the Sun, he therefore found himself challenging the Church establishment at a time when the Church hierarchy also held temporal power and was engaged in the ongoing political challenge of the rise of Protestantism. After discussions with Pope Urban VIII (a man who had written admiringly of Galileo before taking papal office), Galileo believed he could avoid censure by presenting his arguments in dialogue form, but the Pope took offence when he discovered that some of his own words were being spoken by a character in the book who was a simpleton and Galileo was called for a trial before the Inquisition.

In this most famous example cited by critics of the Catholic Church's "posture towards science", Galileo Galilei was denounced in 1633 for his work on the heliocentric model of the Solar System, previously proposed by the Polish clergyman and intellectual Nicolaus Copernicus. Copernicus's work had been suppressed de facto by the Church, but Catholic authorities were generally tolerant of discussion of the hypothesis as long as it was portrayed only as a useful mathematical fiction, and not descriptive of reality. Galileo, by contrast, argued from his unprecedented observations of the Solar System that the heliocentric system was not merely an abstract model for calculating planetary motions, but actually corresponded to physical reality – that is, he insisted the planets really do orbit the Sun. After years of telescopic observation, consultations with the Popes, and verbal and written discussions with astronomers and clerics, a trial was convened by the Tribunal of the Roman and Universal Inquisition. Galileo was found "vehemently suspect of heresy" (not "guilty of heresy", as is frequently misreported), placed under house arrest, and all of his works, including any future writings, were banned. Galileo had been threatened with torture and other Catholic scientists fell silent on the issue. Galileo's great contemporary René Descartes stopped publishing in France and went to Sweden. According to historian of science Jacob Bronowski:

The effect of the trial and imprisonment was to put a total stop to the scientific tradition in the Mediterranean. From now on the Scientific Revolution moved to Northern Europe.

Pope John Paul II in 1992 publicly expressed regret for the actions of those Catholics who badly treated Galileo in that trial. Cardinal John Henry Newman, in the nineteenth century, claimed that those who attack the Church can only point to the Galileo case, which to many historians does not prove the Church's opposition to science since many of the churchmen at that time were encouraged by the Church to continue their research.

=== Evolution ===
Since the publication of Charles Darwin's On the Origin of Species in 1859, the position of the Catholic Church on the theory of evolution has slowly been refined. For about 100 years, there was no authoritative pronouncement on the subject, though many hostile comments were made by local church figures. In contrast with many Protestant objections, Catholic issues with evolutionary theory have had little to do with maintaining the literalism of the account in the Book of Genesis, and have always been concerned with the question of how man came to have a soul. Modern Creationism has had little Catholic support. In the 1950s, the Church's position was one of neutrality; by the late 20th century its position evolved to one of general acceptance in recent years. However, the church insists that the human soul was immediately infused by God, and the reality of a single ancestor (commonly called monogenism) for the human race.

Today, the Church's official position is a fairly non-specific example of theistic evolution, stating that faith and scientific findings regarding human evolution are not in conflict, though humans are regarded as a special creation, and that the existence of God is required to explain both monogenism and the spiritual component of human origins. No infallible declarations by the Pope or an Ecumenical Council have been made. The Catholic Church's official position is fairly non-specific, stating only that faith and the origin of man's material body "from pre-existing living matter" are not in conflict, and that the existence of God is required to explain the spiritual component of man's origin.

=== Embryonic stem cell research ===
Recently, the Church has been criticized for its teaching that embryonic stem cell research is a form of experimentation on human beings, and results in the killing of a human person. Much criticism of this position has been on the grounds that the doctrine hinders scientific research; even some conservatives, taking a utilitarian position, have pointed out that most embryos from which stem cells are harvested are "leftover" from in vitro fertilization, and would soon be discarded whether used for such research or not. The Church, by contrast, has consistently upheld its ideal of the dignity of each individual human life, and argues that it is as wrong to destroy an embryo as it would be to kill an adult human being; and that therefore advances in medicine can and must come without the destruction of human embryos, for example by using adult or umbilical stem cells in place of embryonic stem cells.

== Arts ==
=== Byzantium ===
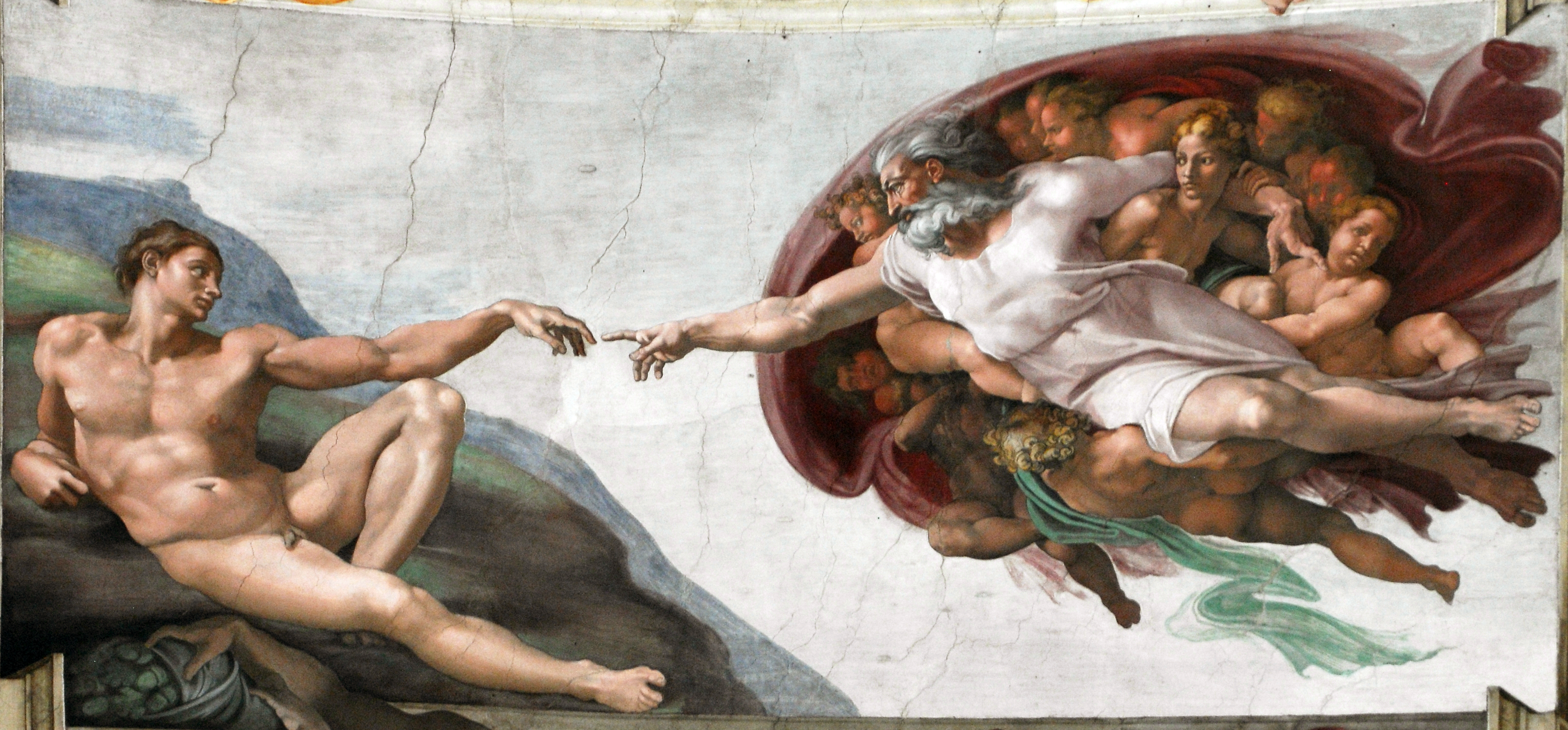
The Creation of Adam by Michelangelo from the ceiling of the Sistine Chapel

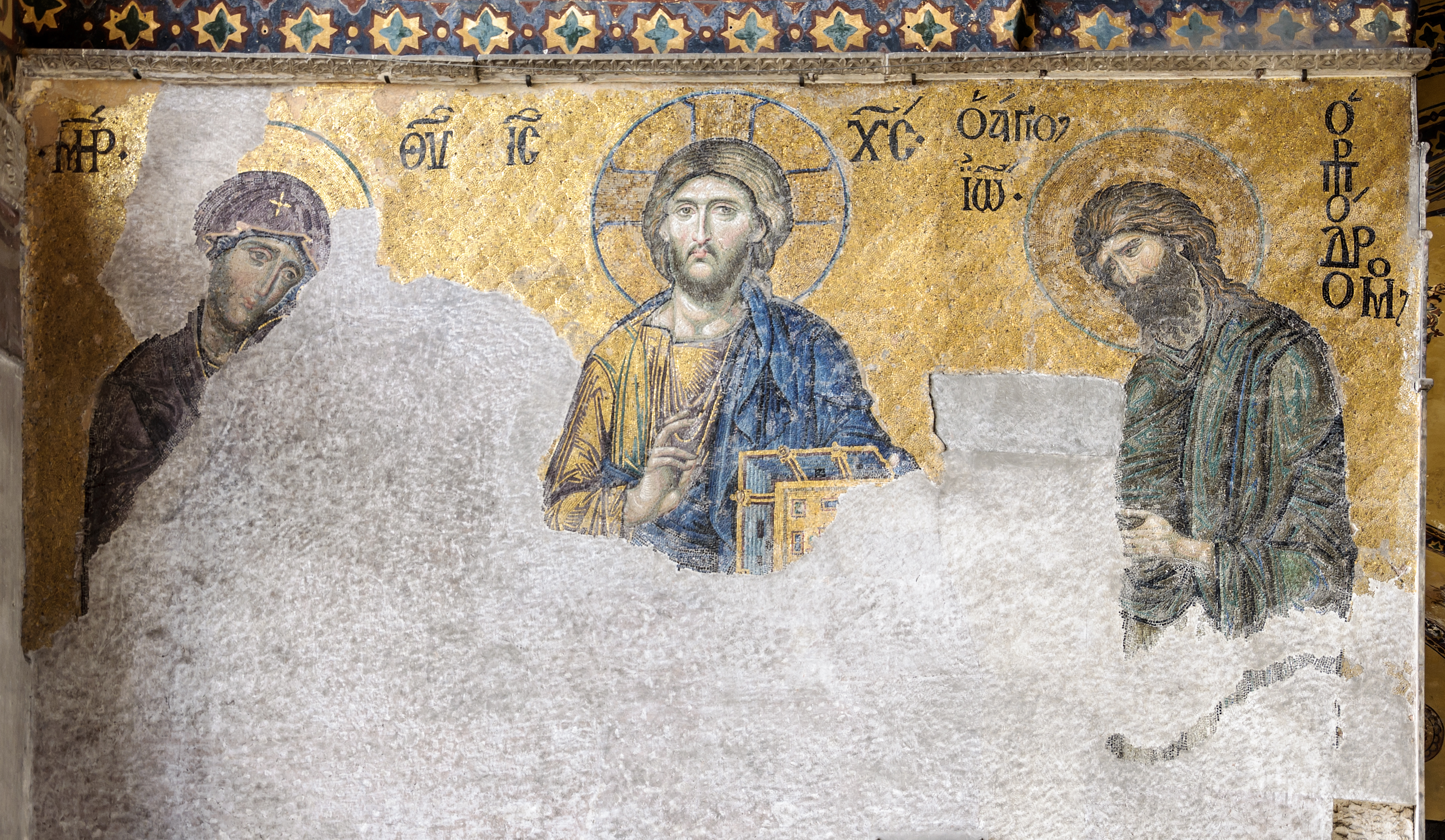
Byzantine mosaic of the Deesis, 13th century, Hagia Sophia

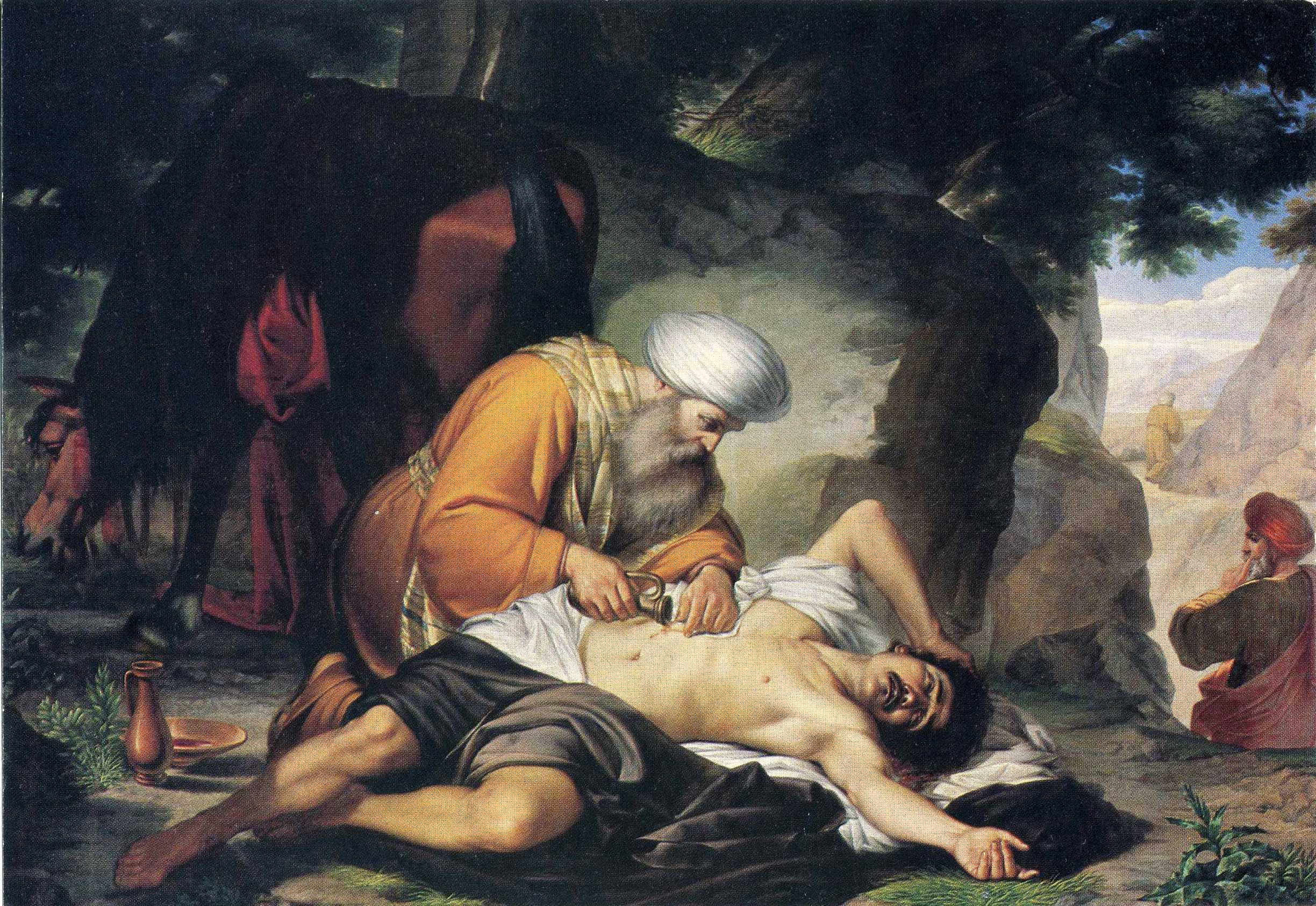
An 18th century Italian depiction of the Parable of the Good Samaritan. Biblical subjects have been a constant theme of Western art.

Byzantine art comprises the body of Christian Greek artistic products of the Eastern Roman Empire, as well as the nations and states that inherited culturally from the empire. Though the empire itself emerged from the decline of Rome and lasted until the Fall of Constantinople in 1453.

Many Eastern Orthodox states in Eastern Europe, as well as to some degree the Muslim states of the eastern Mediterranean, preserved many aspects of the empire's culture and art for centuries afterward. A number of states contemporary with the Byzantine Empire were culturally influenced by it, without actually being part of it (the "Byzantine commonwealth"). These included Bulgaria, Serbia, and the Rus, as well as some non-Orthodox states like the Republic of Venice and the Kingdom of Sicily, which had close ties to the Byzantine Empire despite being in other respects part of western European culture. Art produced by Eastern Orthodox Christians living in the Ottoman Empire is often called "post-Byzantine". Certain artistic traditions that originated in the Byzantine Empire, particularly in regard to icon painting and church architecture, are maintained in Greece, Serbia, Bulgaria, Macedonia, Russia and other Eastern Orthodox countries to the present day.

=== Architecture ===
Several historians credit the Catholic Church for what they consider to be the brilliance and magnificence of Western art. "Even though the church dominated art and architecture, it did not prevent architects and artists from experimenting..." Historians such as Thomas Woods refer to the western Church's consistent opposition to Byzantine iconoclasm, an eastern movement against visual representations of the divine, and the western church's insistence on building structures befitting worship. Important contributions include its cultivation and patronage of individual artists, as well as development of the Romanesque, Gothic and Renaissance styles of art and architecture.

British art historian Kenneth Clark wrote that Western Europe's first "great age of civilization" was ready to begin around the year 1000. From 1100, he wrote, monumental abbeys and cathedrals were constructed and decorated with sculptures, hangings, mosaics and works belonging to one of the greatest epochs of art, providing stark contrast to the monotonous and cramped conditions of ordinary living during the period. The Late Middle Ages produced ever more extravagant art and architecture, but also the virtuous simplicity of those such as St Francis of Assisi (expressed in the Canticle of the Sun) and the epic poetry of Dante's Divine Comedy. Abbot Suger of the Abbey of St. Denis is considered an influential early patron of Gothic architecture. He believed that love of beauty brought people closer to God: "The dull mind rises to truth through that which is material". Clarke calls this "the intellectual background of all the sublime works of art of the next century and in fact has remained the basis of our belief of the value of art until today".

=== Painting and sculpture ===
Renaissance artists such as Raphael, Michelangelo, Leonardo da Vinci, Bernini, Botticelli, Fra Angelico, Tintoretto, Caravaggio, and Titian, were among a multitude of innovative virtuosos sponsored by the Church. During both The Renaissance and the Counter-Reformation, Catholic artists produced many of the unsurpassed masterpieces of Western art – often inspired by Biblical themes: from Michelangelo's David and Pietà sculptures, to Da Vinci's Last Supper and Raphael's various Madonna paintings. Referring to a "great outburst of creative energy such as took place in Rome between 1620 and 1660", Kenneth Clarke wrote:

[W]ith a single exception, the great artists of the time were all sincere, conforming Christians. Guercino spent much of his mornings in prayer; Bernini frequently went into retreats and practised the Spiritual Exercises of Saint Ignatius; Rubens attended Mass every morning before beginning work. The exception was Caravaggio, who was like the hero of a modern play, except that he happened to paint very well. This conformism was not based on fear of the Inquisition, but on the perfectly simple belief that the faith which had inspired the great saints of the preceding generation was something by which a man should regulate his life.

=== Music ===
In music, Catholic monks developed the first forms of modern Western musical notation in order to standardize liturgy throughout the worldwide Church, and an enormous body of religious music has been composed for it through the ages. This led directly to the emergence and development of European classical music, and its many derivatives. The Baroque style, which encompassed music, art, and architecture, was particularly encouraged by the post-Reformation Catholic Church as such forms offered a means of religious expression that was stirring and emotional, intended to stimulate religious fervor.

The list of Catholic composers and Catholic sacred music which have a prominent place in Western culture is extensive, but includes Wolfgang Amadeus Mozart's Ave Verum Corpus; Franz Schubert's Ave Maria, César Franck's Panis angelicus, and Antonio Vivaldi's Gloria.

=== Literature ===
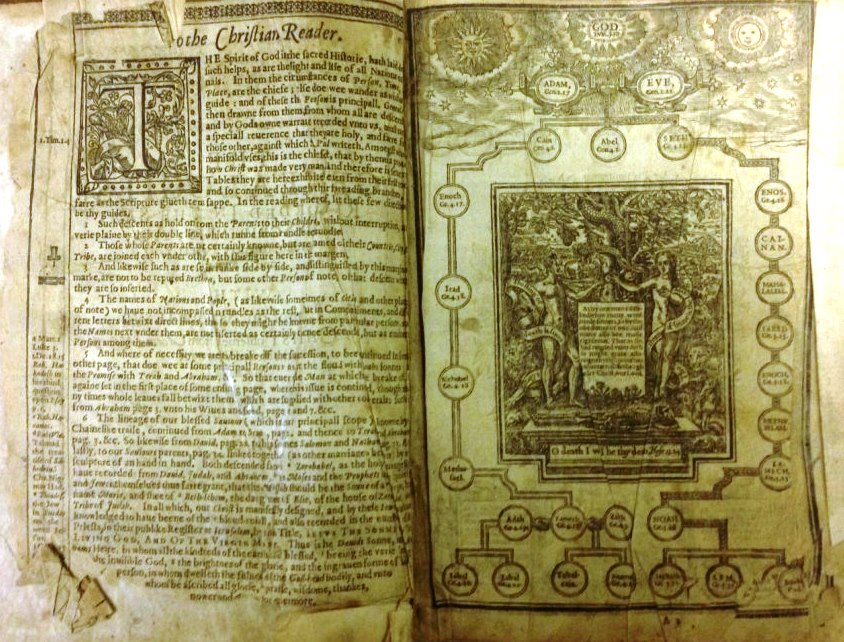
John Speed's Genealogies Recorded in the Sacred Scriptures (1611), bound into first King James Bible in quarto size (1612)

Christian literature is writing that deals with Christian themes and incorporates the Christian world view. This constitutes a huge body of extremely varied writing. Christian poetry is any poetry that contains Christian teachings, themes, or references. The influence of Christianity on poetry has been great in any area that Christianity has taken hold. Christian poems often directly reference the Bible, while others provide allegory.

Similarly, the list of Catholic authors and literary works is vast. With a literary tradition spanning two millennia, the Bible and Papal Encyclicals have been constants of the Catholic canon but countless other historical works may be listed as noteworthy in terms of their influence on Western society. From late Antiquity, St Augustine's book Confessions, which outlines his sinful youth and conversion to Christianity, is widely considered to be the first autobiography ever written in the canon of Western Literature. Augustine profoundly influenced the coming medieval worldview. The Summa Theologica, written 1265–1274, is the best-known work of Thomas Aquinas (c.1225–1274), and although unfinished, "one of the classics of the history of philosophy and one of the most influential works of Western literature." It is intended as a manual for beginners in theology and a compendium of all of the main theological teachings of the Church. It presents the reasoning for almost all points of Christian theology in the West. The epic poetry of the Italian Dante and his Divine Comedy of the late Middle Ages is also considered immensely influential. The English statesman and philosopher, Thomas More, wrote the seminal work Utopia in 1516. St Ignatius Loyola, a key figure in the Catholic counter-reformation, is the author of an influential book of meditations known as the Spiritual Exercises.

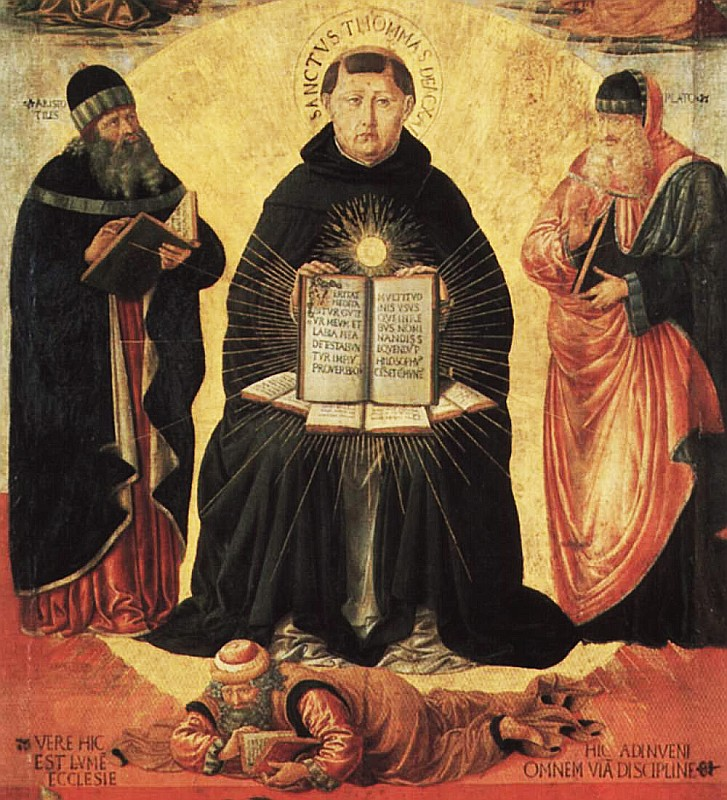
Saint Thomas Aquinas was one of the great scholars of the Medieval period.

Scholasticism was initially a program conducted by medieval Christian thinkers attempting to harmonize the various authorities of their own tradition, and to reconcile Christian theology with classical and late antiquity philosophy, especially that of Aristotle but also of Neoplatonism. The scholastics' intellectual systems by Aquinas, called the Summa Theologiae, influenced the writings of Dante, and in turn, Dante's creation and sacramental theology has contributed to a Catholic imagination influencing writers such as J. R. R. Tolkien and William Shakespeare.

In Catholicism, "Doctor of the Church" is a name is given to a saint from whose writings the whole Church is held to have derived great advantage and to whom "eminent learning" and "great sanctity" have been attributed by a proclamation of a pope or of an ecumenical council. This honour is given rarely, and only after canonization.

The King James Version, is an English translation of the Christian Bible, has been described as one of the most important books in English culture and a driving force in the shaping of the English-speaking world.

=== Protestant ===
The arts have been strongly inspired by Protestant beliefs. Martin Luther, Paul Gerhardt, George Wither, Isaac Watts, Charles Wesley, William Cowper, and many other authors and composers created well-known church hymns. Musicians like Heinrich Schütz, Johann Sebastian Bach, George Frederick Handel, Henry Purcell, Johannes Brahms, and Felix Mendelssohn-Bartholdy composed great works of music. Prominent painters with Protestant background were, for example, Albrecht Dürer, Hans Holbein the Younger, Lucas Cranach, Rembrandt, and Vincent van Gogh. World literature was enriched by the works of Edmund Spenser, John Milton, John Bunyan, John Donne, John Dryden, Daniel Defoe, William Wordsworth, Jonathan Swift, Johann Wolfgang Goethe, Friedrich Schiller, Samuel Taylor Coleridge, Edgar Allan Poe, Matthew Arnold, Conrad Ferdinand Meyer, Theodor Fontane, Washington Irving, Robert Browning, Emily Dickinson, Emily Brontë, Charles Dickens, Nathaniel Hawthorne, Thomas Stearns Eliot, John Galsworthy, Thomas Mann, William Faulkner, John Updike, and many others.

== Economic development ==
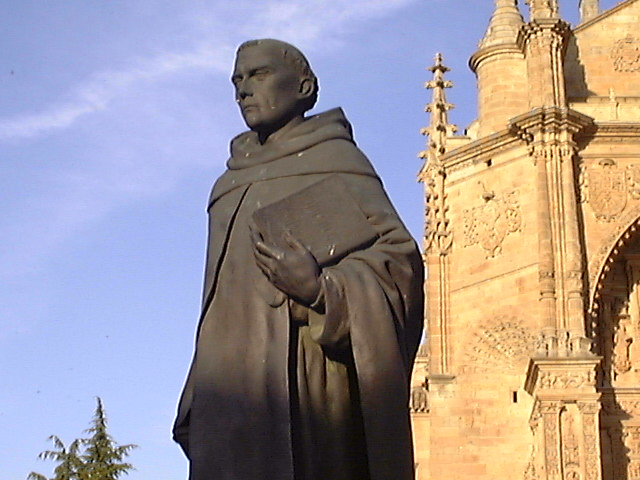
Statue of Francisco de Vitoria at San Esteban, Salamanca

The notion of Christian finance refers to banking and financial activities which came into existence several centuries ago.

Christian Churches, such as the Catholic Church and Reformed Church, traditionally prohibit usury as a sin against the eighth commandment.

The activities of the Knights Templar (12th century), Mounts of Piety (appeared in 1462) or the Apostolic Chamber attached directly to the Vatican, may have given rise to operations of a banking nature or a financial nature (issuance of securities, investments) is proved.

Francisco de Vitoria, a disciple of Thomas Aquinas and a Catholic thinker who studied the issue regarding the human rights of colonized natives, is recognized by the United Nations as a father of international law, and now also by historians of economics and democracy as a leading light for the West's democracy and rapid economic development.

Joseph Schumpeter, an economist of the twentieth century, referring to the Scholastics, wrote, "it is they who come nearer than does any other group to having been the 'founders' of scientific economics." Other economists and historians, such as Raymond de Roover, Marjorie Grice-Hutchinson, and Alejandro Chafuen, have also made similar statements. Historian Paul Legutko of Stanford University said the Catholic Church is "at the center of the development of the values, ideas, science, laws, and institutions which constitute what we call Western civilization."

Catholic banking families includes House of Medici, Welser family, Fugger family, and Simonetti family.

=== Protestant work ethic ===
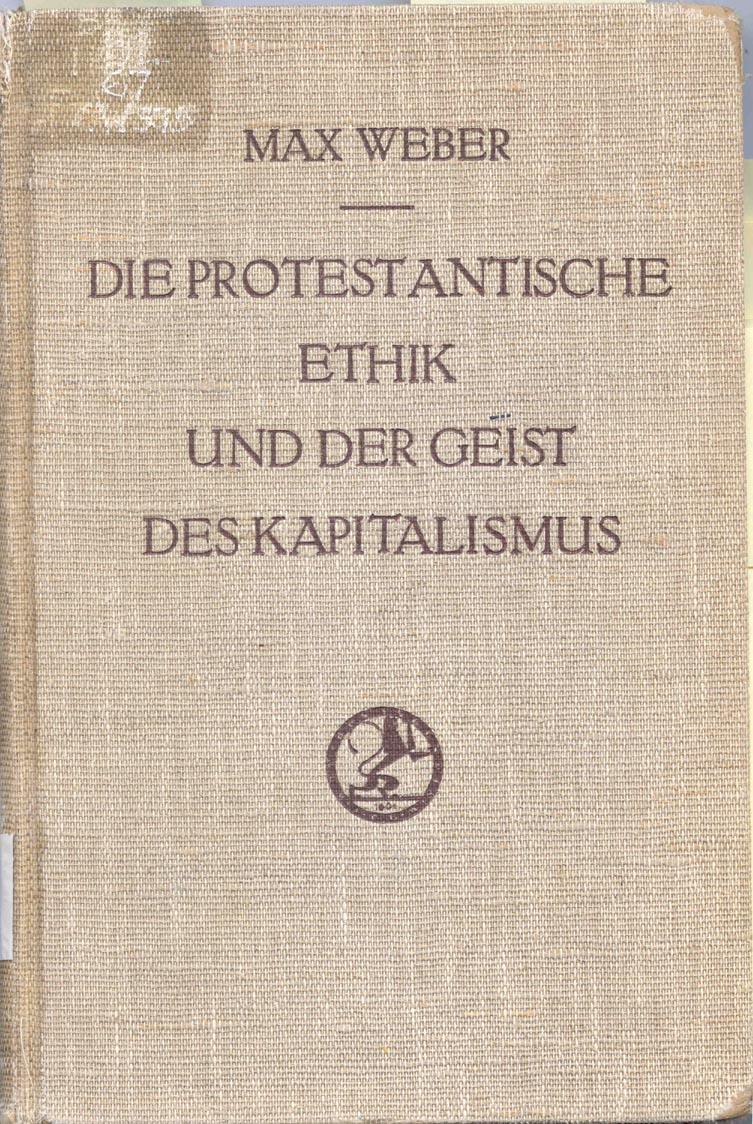
Cover of the original German edition of The Protestant Ethic and the Spirit of Capitalism

The rise of Protestantism in the 16th century contributed to the development of banking in Northern Europe. In the late 18th century, Protestant merchant families began to move into banking to an increasing degree, especially in trading countries such as the United Kingdom (Barings, Lloyd), Germany (Schroders, Berenbergs) and the Netherlands (Hope & Co., Gülcher & Mulder). At the same time, new types of financial activities broadened the scope of banking far beyond its origins. One school of thought attributes Calvinism with setting the stage for the later development of capitalism in northern Europe. The Morgan family is an American Episcopal Church family and banking dynasty, which became prominent in the U.S. and throughout the world in the late 19th century and early 20th century.

The Protestant work ethic, the Calvinist work ethic, or the Puritan work ethic is a work ethic concept in theology, sociology, economics and history which emphasizes that hard work, discipline, and frugality are a result of a person's subscription to the values espoused by the Protestant faith, particularly Calvinism. The phrase was initially coined in 1904–1905 by Max Weber in his book The Protestant Ethic and the Spirit of Capitalism. Weber asserted that Protestant ethics and values along with the Calvinist doctrine of asceticism and predestination gave birth to capitalism. It is one of the most influential and cited books in sociology although the thesis presented has been controversial since its release. In opposition to Weber, historians such as Fernand Braudel and Hugh Trevor-Roper assert that the Protestant work ethic did not create capitalism and that capitalism developed in pre-Reformation Catholic communities. Just as priests and caring professionals are deemed to have a vocation (or "calling" from God) for their work, according to the Protestant work ethic the lowly workman also has a noble vocation which he can fulfil through dedication to his work.

The Protestant concept of God and man allows believers to use all their God-given faculties, including the power of reason. That means that they are allowed to explore God's creation and, according to Genesis 2:15, make use of it in a responsible and sustainable way. Thus a cultural climate was created that greatly enhanced the development of the humanities and the sciences. Another consequence of the Protestant understanding of man is that the believers, in gratitude for their election and redemption in Christ, are to follow God's commandments. Industry, frugality, calling, discipline, and a strong sense of responsibility are at the heart of their moral code. In particular, Calvin rejected luxury. Therefore, craftsmen, industrialists, and other businessmen were able to reinvest the greater part of their profits in the most efficient machinery and the most modern production methods that were based on progress in the sciences and technology. As a result, productivity grew, which led to increased profits and enabled employers to pay higher wages. In this way, the economy, the sciences, and technology reinforced each other. The chance to participate in the economic success of technological inventions was a strong incentive to both inventors and investors. The Protestant work ethic was an important force behind the unplanned and uncoordinated mass action that influenced the development of capitalism and the Industrial Revolution. This idea is also known as the "Protestant ethic thesis".

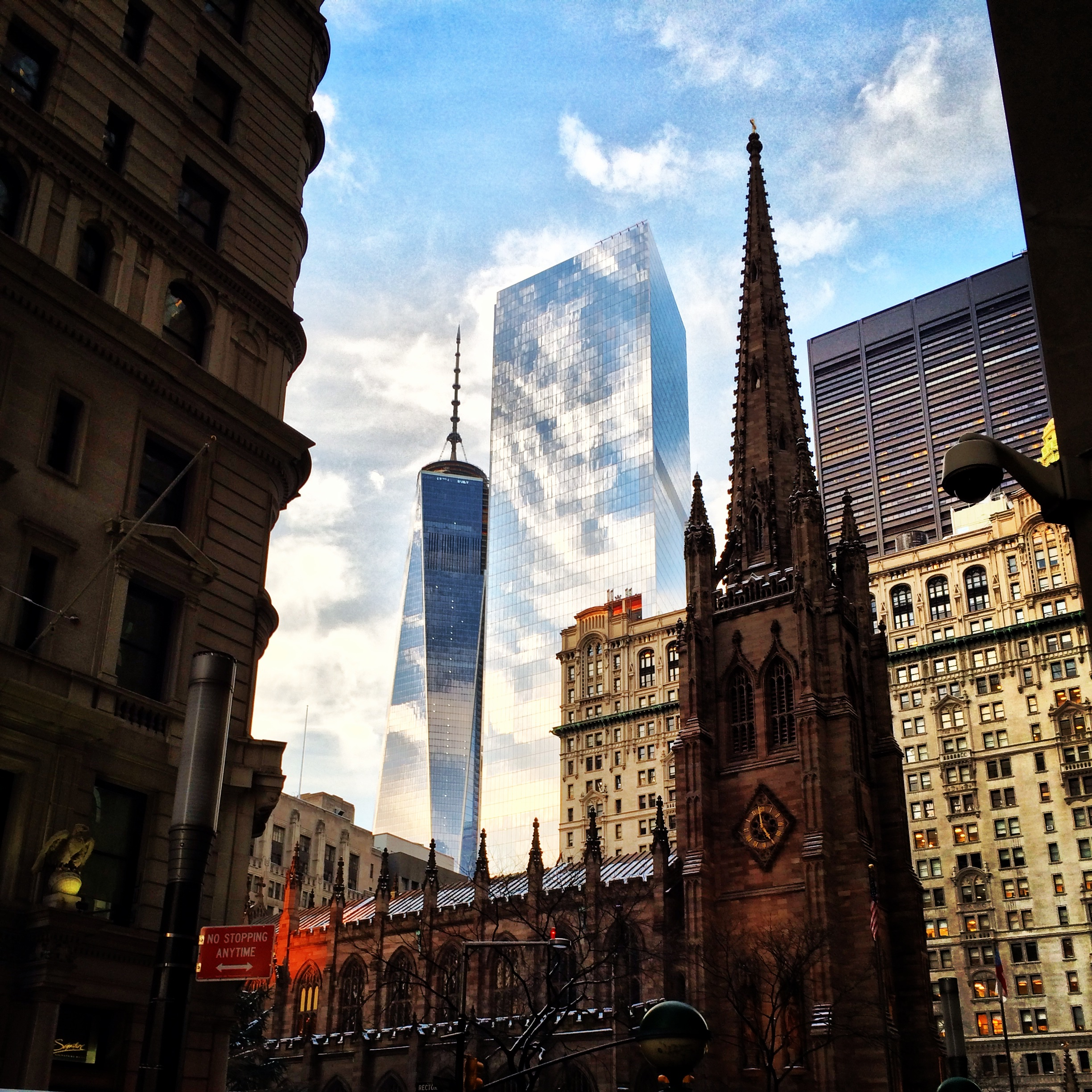
Trinity Church in Manhattan; it has been seen as embodying the White Anglo-Saxon Protestant culture in the United States.

Episcopalians and Presbyterians tend to be considerably wealthier and better educated (having more graduate and post-graduate degrees per capita) than most other religious groups in America, and are disproportionately represented in the upper reaches of American business, law and politics, especially the Republican Party. Large numbers of the most wealthy and affluent American families as the Vanderbilts, Astors, Rockefellers, Du Ponts, Whitneys, Morgans, Fords, Mellons, Van Leers, Browns, Waynes and Harrimans are Mainline Protestant families. The Boston Brahmins, who were regarded as the nation's social and cultural elites, were often associated with the American upper class, Harvard University; and the Episcopal Church. The Old Philadelphianss were often associated with the American upper class and the Episcopal Church and Quakerism. These families were influential in the development and leadership of arts, culture, science, medicine, law, politics, industry and trade in the United States.

Some academics have theorized that Lutheranism, the dominant traditional religion of the Nordic countries, had an effect on the development of social democracy there and the Nordic model. Schröder posits that Lutheranism promoted the idea of a nationwide community of believers and led to increased state involvement in economic and social life, allowing for nationwide welfare solidarity and economic co-ordination. Esa Mangeloja says that the revival movements helped to pave the way for the modern Finnish welfare state. During that process, the church lost some of its most important social responsibilities (health care, education, and social work) as these tasks were assumed by the secular Finnish state. Pauli Kettunen presents the Nordic model as the outcome of a sort of mythical "Lutheran peasant enlightenment", portraying the Nordic model as the result of a sort of "secularized Lutheranism"; however, mainstream academic discourse on the subject focuses on "historical specificity", with the centralized structure of the Lutheran church being but one aspect of the cultural values and state structures that led to the development of the welfare state in Scandinavia.

== Social justice, care-giving, and the hospital system ==
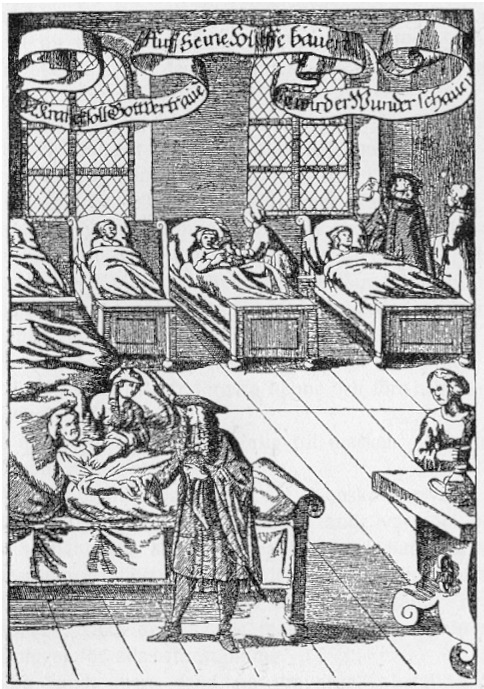
Historian of hospitals, Guenter Risse, says that the Church spearheaded the development of a hospital system geared towards the marginalized.

Hospitals were founded and funded by Christian religious orders, being a "distinctly Christian innovation rooted in the monastic virtue and practise of hospitality". Christian denominations, including Roman Catholics, Evangelical-Lutherans and Methodists, continue to operate a large number of hospitals today. Christian deaconesses have played a prominent role in healthcare. The Catholic Church has contributed to society through its social doctrine which has guided leaders to promote social justice and providing care to the sick and poor. In orations such as his Sermon on the Mount and stories such as The Good Samaritan, Jesus called on followers to worship God, act without violence or prejudice and care for the sick, hungry and poor. Such teachings are the foundation of Catholic Church involvement in social justice, hospitals and health care.

A number of Christian denominations, such as the Wesleyan Methodist Church and the Religious Society of Friends, maintained a theological opposition to slavery and championed abolitionism; for example, speaking out against slavery is one of the Methodist works of mercy. Christian missionaries, who saw all humans as descending from Adam and Eve, "were ardently opposed to slavery" and worked for its abolition, influencing the peoples of Africa to draw near to Christianity.

Today the Roman Catholic Church is the largest non-government provider of health care services in the world. It has around 18,000 clinics, 16,000 homes for the elderly and those with special needs, and 5,500 hospitals, with 65 percent of them located in developing countries. In 2010, the Church's Pontifical Council for the Pastoral Care of Health Care Workers said that the Church manages 26% of the world's health care facilities.

=== Fourth century ===
Historians record that, prior to Christianity, the ancient world left little trace of any organized charitable effort. Christian charity and the practice of feeding and clothing the poor, visiting prisoners, supporting widows and orphan children has had sweeping impact.

Albert Jonsen, University of Washington historian of medicine, says "the second great sweep of medical history begins at the end of the fourth century, with the founding of the first Christian hospital at Caesarea in Cappadocia, and concludes at the end of the fourteenth century, with medicine well ensconced in the universities and in the public life of the emerging nations of Europe." After the death of Eusebios in 370 and the election of Basil as bishop of Caesarea, Basil established the first formal soup kitchen, hospital, homeless shelter, hospice, poorhouse, orphanage, reform center for thieves, women's center for those leaving prostitution and many other ministries. Basil was personally involved and invested in the projects and process giving all of his personal wealth to fund the ministries. Basil himself would put on an apron and work in the soup kitchen. These ministries were given freely regardless of religious affiliation. Basil refused to make any discrimination when it came to people who needed help saying that "the digestive systems of the Jew and the Christian are indistinguishable." "...there is a striking resemblance between [Basil's] ideals and those of modern times. ... certainly he was the most modern among the pioneers of monasticism, and for this reason, if for none other, his work has a permanent interest..."

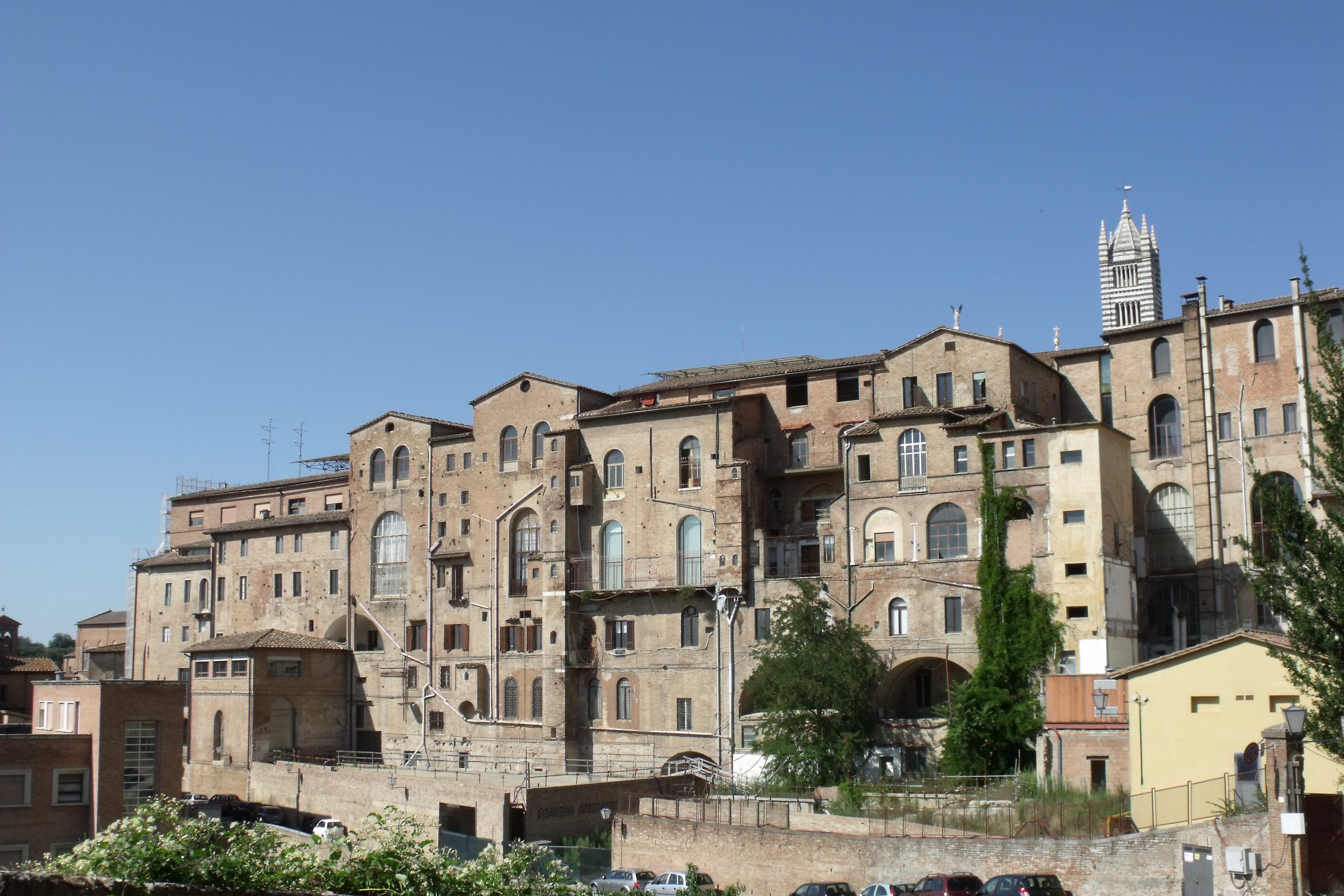
Panorama of Siena's Santa Maria della Scala Hospital, one of Europe's oldest hospitals

Charity has now become a universal practice. Christianity played a key role in the building and maintaining of hospitals in the Byzantine Empire. Many hospitals were built and maintained by bishops in their respective prefectures. Hospitals were usually built near or around churches, and great importance was laid on the idea of healing through salvation. When medicine failed, doctors would ask their patients to pray. This often involved icons of Cosmas and Damian, patron saints of medicine and doctors. Christianity also played a key role in propagating the idea of charity. Medicine was made, according to Oregon State University historian, Gary Ferngren (professor of ancient Greek and Rome history with a speciality in ancient medicine) "accessible to all and... simple". In the actual practice of medicine there is evidence of Christian influence. John Zacharias Aktouarios recommends the use of Holy Water mixed with a pellitory plant to act as a way to cure epilepsy.

=== Medieval period ===
The Catholic Church established a hospital system in medieval Europe that was different from the merely reciprocal hospitality of the Greeks and family-based obligations of the Romans. These hospitals were established to cater to "particular social groups marginalized by poverty, sickness, and age", according to historian of hospitals, Guenter Risse.

The Fugger Family from Augsburg, Germany who were bankers, 500 years ago founded one of the first social housing projects in the world, which exists till today.

=== Industrial Revolution ===
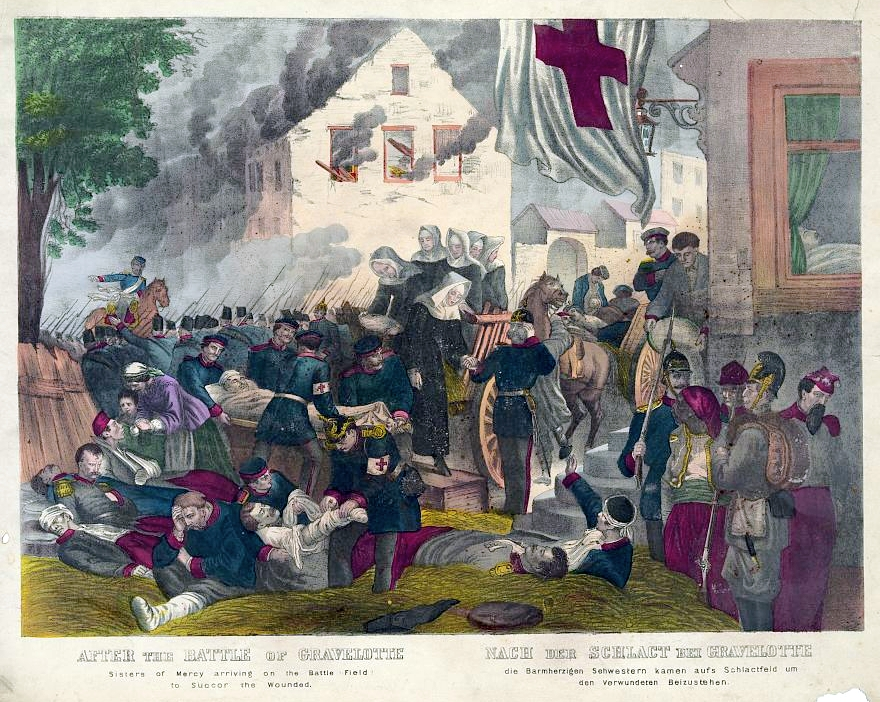
"After the Battle of Gravelotte. The French Sisters of Mercy of St. Borromeo arriving on the battle field to succor the wounded." Unsigned lithograph, 1870 or 1871.

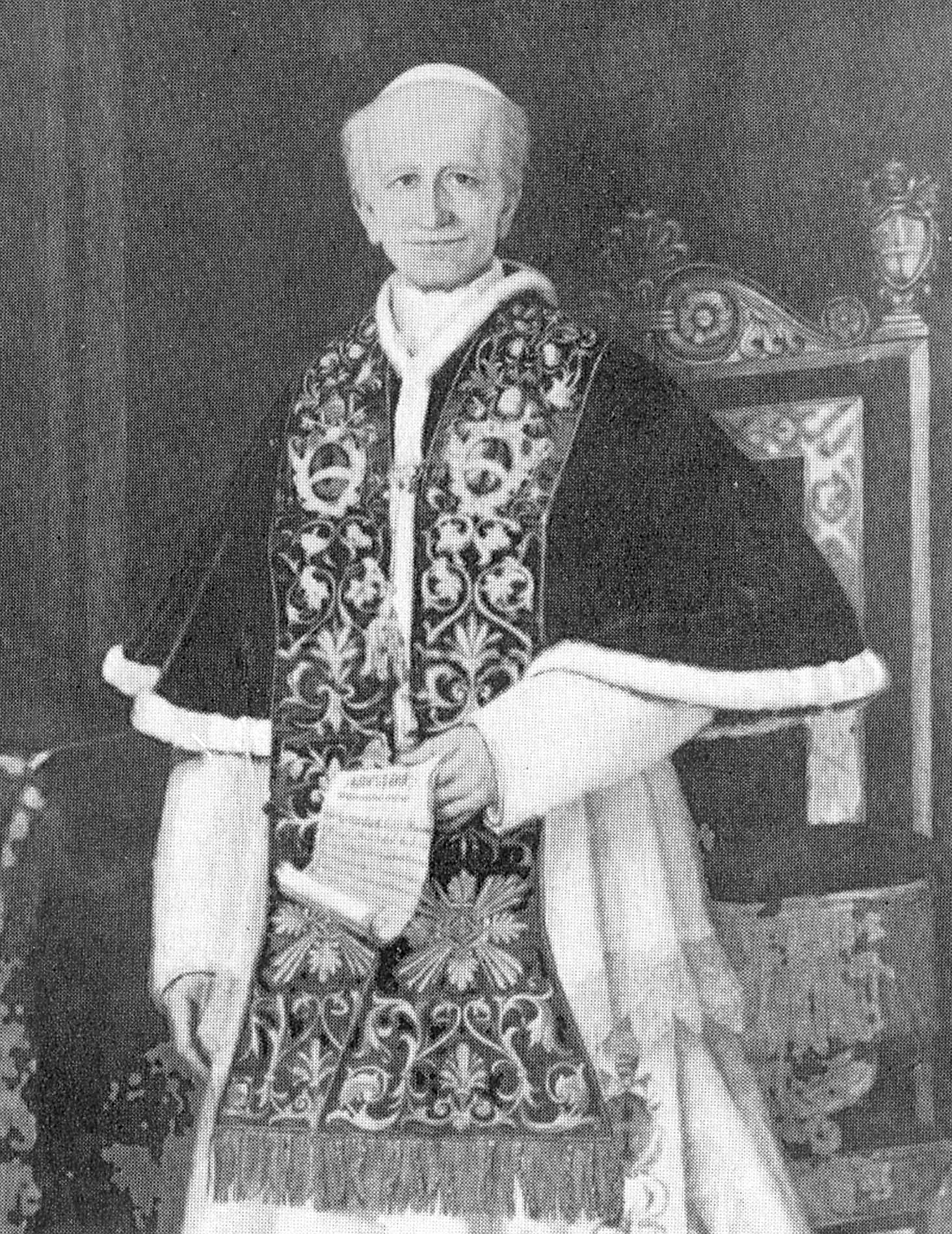
In 1891 Pope Leo XIII issued Rerum novarum in which the Church defined the dignity and rights of industrial workers.

The Industrial Revolution brought many concerns about the deteriorating working and living conditions of urban workers. Influenced by the German Bishop Wilhelm Emmanuel Freiherr von Ketteler, in 1891 Pope Leo XIII published the encyclical Rerum novarum, which set in context Catholic social teaching in terms that rejected socialism but advocated the regulation of working conditions. Rerum Novarum argued for the establishment of a living wage and the right of workers to form trade unions.

Quadragesimo anno was issued by Pope Pius XI, on 15 May 1931, 40 years after Rerum novarum. Unlike Leo, who addressed mainly the condition of workers, Pius XI concentrated on the ethical implications of the social and economic order. He called for the reconstruction of the social order based on the principle of solidarity and subsidiarity. He noted major dangers for human freedom and dignity, arising from unrestrained capitalism and totalitarian communism.

The social teachings of Pope Pius XII repeat these teachings, and apply them in greater detail not only to workers and owners of capital, but also to other professions such as politicians, educators, house-wives, farmers bookkeepers, international organizations, and all aspects of life including the military. Going beyond Pius XI, he also defined social teachings in the areas of medicine, psychology, sport, TV, science, law and education. Pius XII was called "the Pope of Technology" for his willingness and ability to examine the social implications of technological advances. The dominant concern was the continued rights and dignity of the individual. With the beginning of the space age at the end of his pontificate, Pius XII explored the social implications of space exploration and satellites on the social fabric of humanity asking for a new sense of community and solidarity in light of existing papal teachings on subsidiarity.

The Methodist Church, among other Christian denominations, was responsible for the establishment of hospitals, universities, orphanages, soup kitchens, and schools to follow Jesus's command to spread the Good News and serve all people. In Western nations, governments have increasingly taken up funding and organisation of health services for the poor but the Church still maintains a massive network of health care providers across the world. In the West, these institutions are increasingly run by lay-people after centuries of being run by priests, nuns and brothers, In 2009, Catholic hospitals in the US received approximately one of every six patients, according to the Catholic Health Association. Catholic Health Australia is the largest non-government provider grouping of health, community and aged care services, representing about 10% of the health sector. In 1968, nuns or priests were the chief executives of 770 of America's 796 Catholic hospitals. By 2011, they presided over 8 of 636 hospitals.

As with schooling, women have played a vital role in running Christian care institutions – in Methodist hospitals, deaconesses who trained as nurses staffed the hospitals, and in Catholic hospitals, through religious institutes like the Sisters of Mercy, Little Sisters of the Poor and Sisters of St. Mary – and teaching and nursing have been seen as "women's vocations". Seeking to define the role played by religious in hospitals through American history, the New York Times noted that nuns were trained to "see Jesus in the face of every patient" and that:

Although their influence is often described as intangible, the nuns kept their hospitals focused on serving the needy and brought a spiritual reassurance that healing would prevail over profit, authorities on Catholic health care say.

=== Asia ===
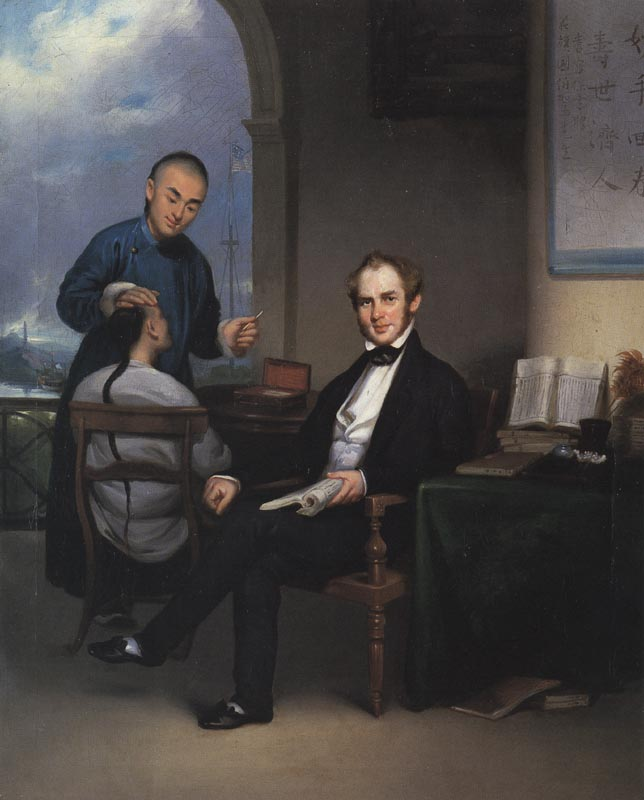
Portrait of Peter Parker, an American physician and a missionary who introduced Western medical techniques into Qing dynasty China

Protestant and Catholic physicians and surgeons of the 19th and early 20th centuries laid many foundations for modern medicine in China. Western medical missionaries established the first modern clinics and hospitals, provided the first training for nurses, and opened the first medical schools in China. Work was also done in opposition to the abuse of opium. Medical treatment and care came to many Chinese who were addicted, and eventually public and official opinion was influenced in favor of bringing an end to the destructive trade. By 1901, China was the most popular destination for medical missionaries. The 150 foreign physicians operated 128 hospitals and 245 dispensaries, treating 1.7 million patients. In 1894, male medical missionaries comprised 14 percent of all missionaries; women doctors were four percent. Modern medical education in China started in the early 20th century at hospitals run by international missionaries.

Missionaries from other Christian denominations came to British India; Lutheran missionaries, for example, arrived in Calcutta in 1836 and by "the year 1880 there were over 31,200 Lutheran Christians spread out in 1,052 villages". Methodists began arriving in India in 1783 and established missions with a focus on "education, health ministry, and evangelism". In the 1790s, Christians from the London Missionary Society and Baptist Missionary Society, began doing missionary work in the Indian Empire. In Neyoor, the London Missionary Society Hospital "pioneered improvements in the public health system for the treatment of diseases even before organised attempts were made by the colonial Madras Presidency, reducing the death rate substantially".

== Education ==
The number of Catholic institutions as of 2000
Institutions	#
Parishes and missions	408,637
Primary and secondary schools	125,016
Universities	1,046
Hospitals	5,853
Orphanages	8,695
Homes for the elderly and handicapped	13,933
Dispensaries, leprosaries, nurseries and other institutions	74,936

Christianity has played a fundamental role in the development of Western education, acting as a primary catalyst for the establishment of formal schooling and the preservation of intellectual traditions. Following the decline of the Western Roman Empire, monasteries and cathedral schools became vital centers for literacy and the preservation of classical texts. This ecclesiastical commitment to learning eventually laid the groundwork for the medieval university system, with institutions like Oxford University, Paris, and Cambridge University originating from church-affiliated schools. For centuries, the church remained the primary provider of education, viewing the study of scripture and the development of reason as inherently connected.

The Protestant Reformation further transformed the educational landscape by championing mass literacy, driven by the theological conviction that all believers should be able to read the Bible. This shift helped democratize knowledge, moving education beyond the elite and into the public sphere as reformers increasingly encouraged the state to take responsibility for schooling. While the modern educational system has largely moved toward secularization, the historical influence of Christian institutions remains embedded in the structure, values, and global reach of Western pedagogical practices, from the establishment of early mission schools to the foundational philosophies that shaped modern university curricula.

== Cleanliness ==
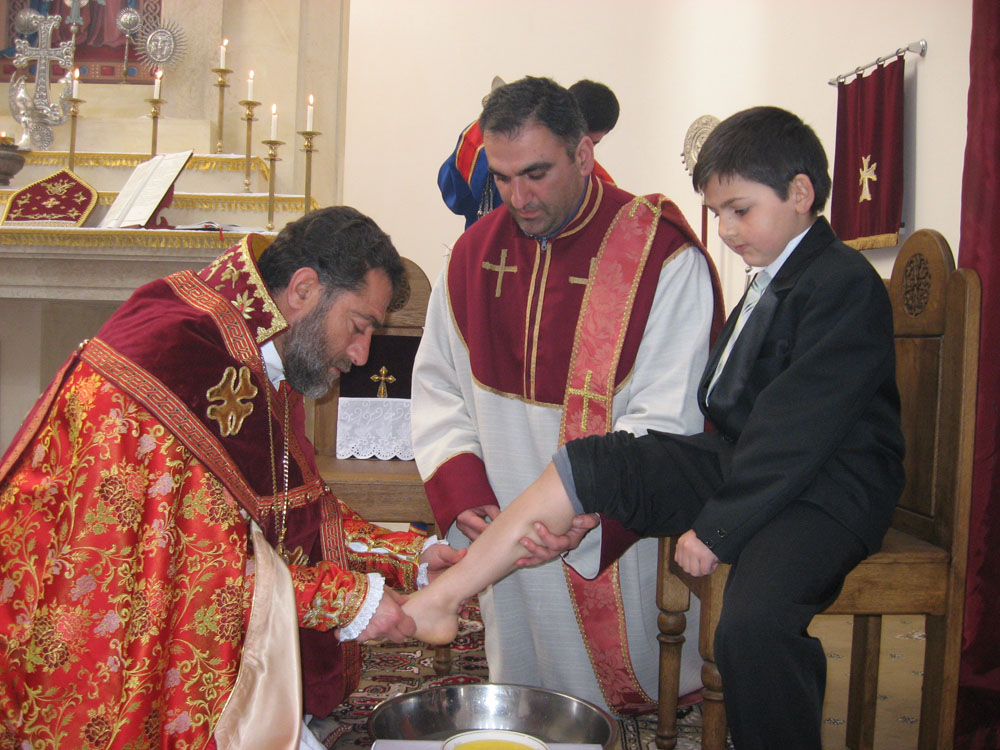
Bishop Sebouh Chouldjian of the Armenian Apostolic Church washing the feet of children

The Bible has many rituals of purification relating to menstruation, childbirth, sexual relations, nocturnal emission, unusual bodily fluids, skin disease, death, and animal sacrifices. The Ethiopian Orthodox Tewahedo Church prescribes several kinds of hand washing for example after leaving the latrine, lavatory or bathhouse, or before prayer, or after eating a meal. The women in the Ethiopian Orthodox Tewahedo Church are prohibited from entering the church temple during menses; and the men do not enter a church the day after they have had intercourse with their wives.

Christianity has always placed a strong emphasis on hygiene, Despite the denunciation of the mixed bathing style of Roman pools by early Christian clergy, as well as the pagan custom of women naked bathing in front of men, this did not stop the Church from urging its followers to go to public baths for bathing, which contributed to hygiene and good health according to the Church Father, Clement of Alexandria. The Church also built public bathing facilities that were separate for both sexes near monasteries and pilgrimage sites; also, the popes situated baths within church basilicas and monasteries since the early Middle Ages. Pope Gregory the Great urged his followers on value of bathing as a bodily need.

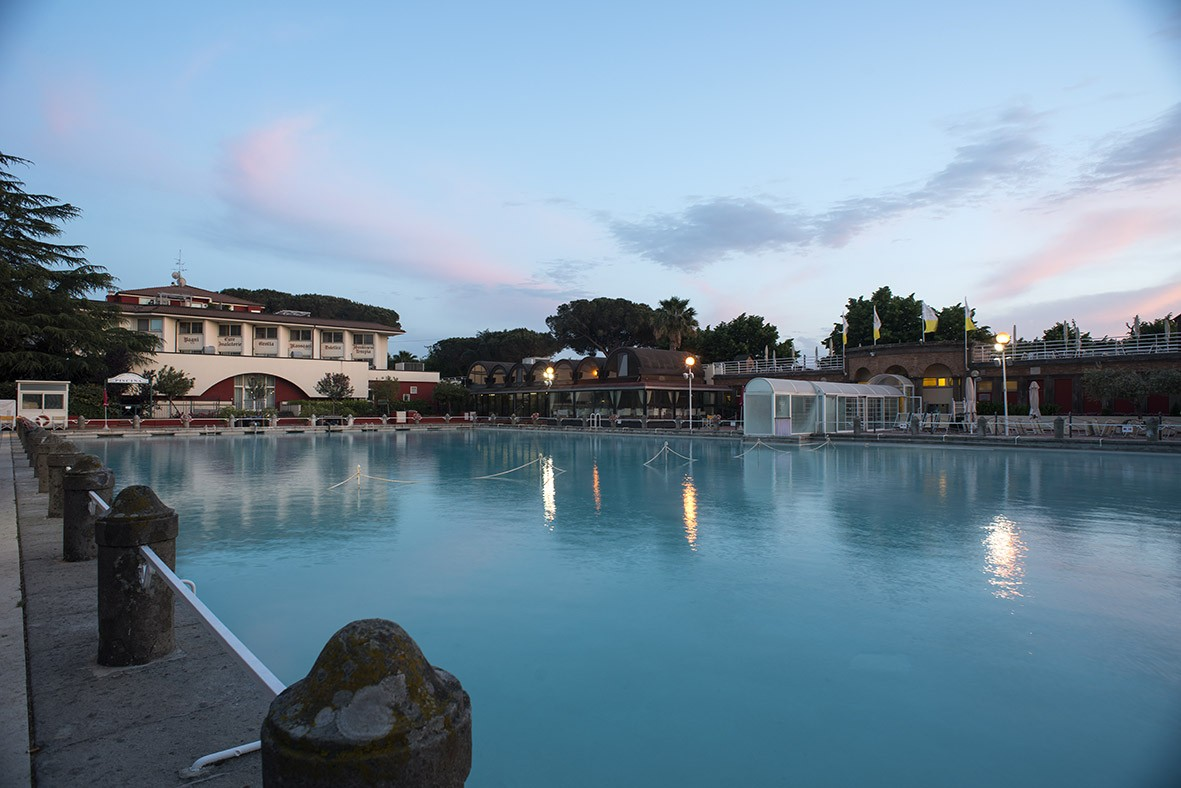
Bagno del Papa in Viterbo

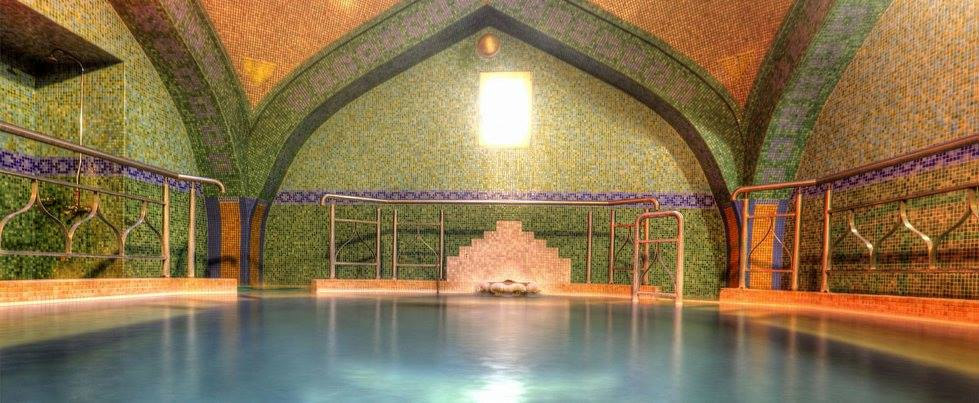
Agkistro Byzantine bath

Great bathhouses were built in Byzantine centers such as Constantinople and Antioch, and the popes allocated to the Romans bathing through diaconia, or private Lateran baths, or even a myriad of monastic bath houses functioning in eighth and ninth centuries. The Popes maintained their baths in their residences, and bath houses including hot baths incorporated into Christian Church buildings or those of monasteries, which known as "charity baths" because they served both the clerics and needy poor people. Public bathing was common in medieval Christendom in larger towns and cities such as Paris, Regensburg and Naples. Catholic religious orders of the Augustinians' and Benedictines' rules contained ritual purification, and inspired by Benedict of Nursia encouragement for the practice of therapeutic bathing; Benedictine monks played a role in the development and promotion of spas. Protestant Christianity also played a prominent role in the development of the British spas.

Contrary to popular belief bathing and sanitation were not lost in Europe with the collapse of the Roman Empire. Soapmaking first became an established trade during the so-called "Dark Ages". The Romans used scented oils (mostly from Egypt), among other alternatives. By the 15th century, the manufacture of soap in the Christendom had become virtually industrialized, with sources in Antwerp, Castile, Marseille, Naples and Venice. By the mid-19th century, the English urbanised middle classes had formed an ideology of cleanliness that ranked alongside typical Victorian concepts, such as Christianity, respectability and social progress. The Salvation Army has adopted the deployment of personal hygiene, and by providing personal hygiene products, such as a toothbrush, toothpaste, and soap.

The use of water in many Christian countries is due in part to the Biblical toilet etiquette which encourages washing after all instances of defecation. The bidet is common in predominantly Catholic countries where water is considered essential for anal cleansing, and in some traditionally Orthodox and Protestant countries such as Greece and Finland respectively, where bidet showers are common.

== See also ==
- Christian culture
  - Catholic culture
- Christian art
- Christendom
- Christian influences on the Islamic world
