= Sarge (TV series) =

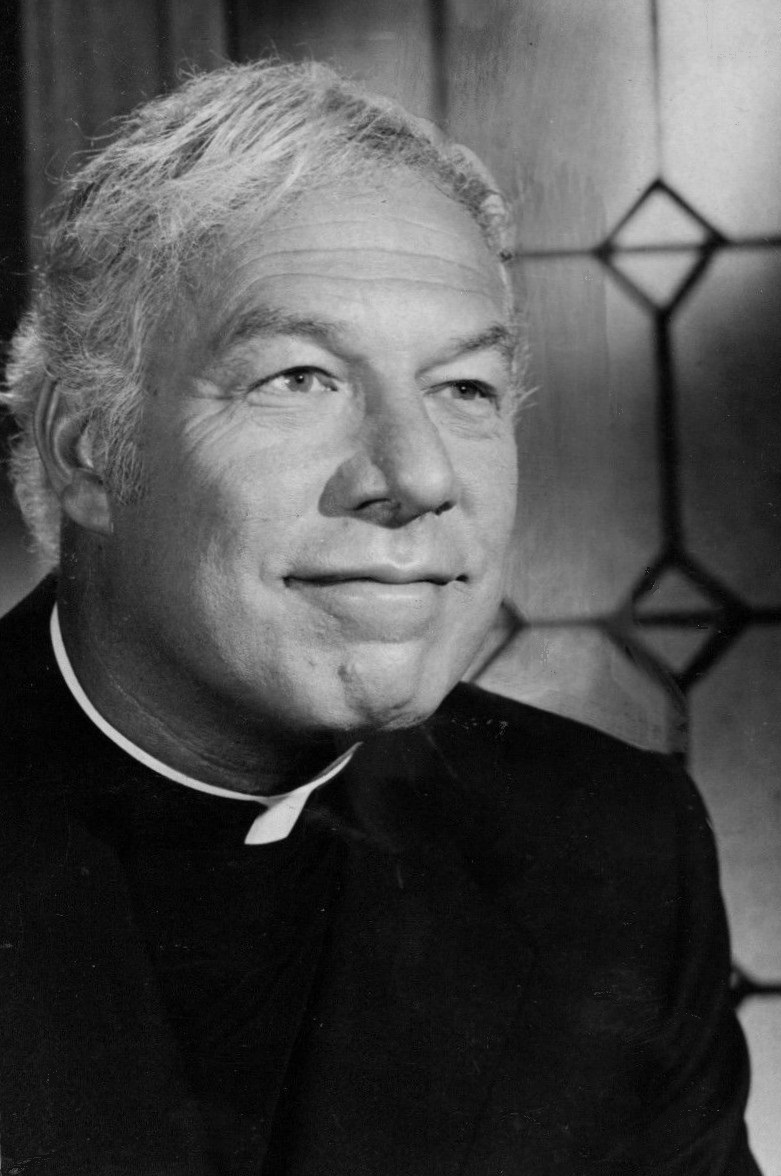
- Promotional photo of George Kennedy for the TV series Sarge
- Genre: Crime drama
- Created by: David Levy
- Starring: George Kennedy
- Theme music composer: David Shire
- Composer: David Shire
- Country of origin: United States
- Original language: English
- No. of seasons: 1
- No. of episodes: 16

Production
- Executive producer: David Levy
- Producer: David Levinson
- Cinematography: Richard A. Kelley; Jacques R. Marquette
- Camera setup: Single-camera
- Running time: 44 mins.
- Production companies: Universal Television; Harbour Productions

Original release
- Network: NBC
- Release: September 21, 1971 – January 11, 1972

Related
- Sarge: The Badge or the Cross; Ironside; The Bold Ones: The New Doctors; Amy Prentiss; Ironside (2013)

Sarge is an American crime drama television series starring George Kennedy. The series aired for one season on NBC from September 1971 to January 1972. It was based on the Father Bredder series of mystery novels by Leonard Wibberley (writing as Leonard Holton).

== Overview ==
Kennedy stars as Samuel Patrick Cavanaugh, a San Diego police detective sergeant who decides to retire and enter the priesthood after his wife is murdered. Sarge had initially studied for the priesthood prior to his police career, but his seminary studies were interrupted by military service in the Marine Corps during World War II.

The series, which ran in 1971–1972, was preceded by a pilot titled Sarge: The Badge or the Cross (February 22, 1971 airdate), which set the premise for the subsequent series. One week before the show's fall premiere, on September 14, 1971, Cavanaugh traveled to San Francisco because of the death of a friend and fellow priest. His investigation caused him to cross paths with the characters from Ironside in a two-hour special that consolidated the two series' consecutive time slots. This has been subsequently seen as a TV movie, The Priest Killer.

The series was set in San Diego and the pilot movie was filmed primarily on location. However, when the series went into production, episodes were filmed in Los Angeles. The parish church used was St. Peter's Italian Catholic Church on North Broadway in Chinatown.

George Kennedy's character was originally Sarge Swanson in the pilot movie. Starting with the Ironside crossover episode, and for the rest of the series, his last name was changed from Swanson to Cavanaugh. Supporting actor Ramon Bieri played Sarge's police contact. In the pilot, his name was Chief Dewey, but was changed to Lt. Barney Verick, chief of detectives, for the series. Sallie Shockley (Valerie) and Harold Sakata (Kenji Takichi) reprised their roles from the pilot movie for the series. Henry Wilcoxon as Bishop Andrade and Dana Elcar as Father Frank Dismore also appeared in the pilot, as well as the series.

== Dan Cooper ==
The second episode of Sarge, "Ring In, Ring Out", features a character named Dan Cooper (played by guest star Martin Sheen). It aired on September 28, 1971. On November 24, 1971, a man giving the name Dan Cooper hijacked Flight 305 from Portland, Oregon, to Seattle, Washington. The name the hijacker gave, Dan Cooper, was mistakenly reported in the press as D.B. Cooper.

== Cast ==
- George Kennedy as "Sarge" (Sarge Swanson in the pilot, Samuel Patrick Cavanaugh in the series)
- Sallie Shockley as Valerie
- Ramon Bieri as Chief Dewey (pilot), Lt. Barney Verick (series)
- Harold Sakata as Kenji Takichi

== Episode list ==
No.	Title	Directed by	Written by	Original release date
0	"The Badge or the Cross"	Richard A. Colla	Don Mankiewicz	February 22, 1971
1	"A Terminal Case of Vengeance"	John Badham	Joel Oliansky	September 21, 1971
2	"Ring Out, Ring In"	Daniel Haller	Edward DeBlasio	September 28, 1971
3	"Psst! Wanna Buy a Dirty Picture?"	Richard Donner	Howard Dimsdale	October 5, 1971
4	"Identity Crisis"	Unknown	John McGreevey	October 12, 1971
5	"A Push Over the Edge"	John Badham	Story by : Stanford Whitmore; Teleplay by : David Levinson	October 26, 1971
6	"John Michael O'Flaherty Presents the Eleven O'Clock War"	Seymour Robbie	Robert Collins	November 2, 1971
7	"Silent Target"	Daniel Haller	Story by : Edward De Blasio; Teleplay by : Joel Oliansky	November 9, 1971
8	"Quicksilver"	Seymour Robbie	Story by : Joel Hammil; Teleplay by : Joel Hammil & Robert Van Scoyk	November 16, 1971
9	"A Bad Case of Monogamy"	Joel Oliansky	Robert Van Scoyk	November 23, 1971
10	"The Combatants"	Walter Doniger	Walter Black	November 30, 1971
11	"A Company of Victims"	Jeannot Szwarc	Robert Collins	December 7, 1971
12	"A Party to the Crime"	Ron Winston	Arthur Heinemann	December 28, 1971
13	"An Accident Waiting to Happen"	Daniel Haller	Stanley Hart	January 4, 1972
14	"Napoleon Never Wanted to Be a Cop"	Georg Fenady	Hal Sitowitz	January 11, 1972

== Reception ==
Sarge was well received but ultimately failed by being pitted against CBS's Hawaii Five-O and The ABC Tuesday Movie of the Week.

== Syndication ==
Since 1973, episodes have been syndicated under The Bold Ones umbrella title, and can be seen on Cozi TV; it was previously seen on the RTV network in selected areas.

== Trivia ==
- Pharrell Williams sampled the theme song in the second half of the two-part track "Let God Sort Em' Out / Chandeliers" by Clipse.

== See also ==
- Father John Blackwood "Blackie" Ryan—A similar priest character who solves crimes in novels written by Andrew Greeley
- Father Frank Dowling—priest character created by Ralph McInerny who solves crimes in several novels written by McInerny and in the subsequent TV show
