= Angel Light =

Angel Light may refer to:

- Angel Light (novel), a 1995 novel
- Angel Light, a device invented by Troy Hurtubise which can purportedly render objects transparent
- Angel-lights, an architectural term
