= Irish stew (disambiguation) =

Irish stew is an Irish dish of lamb or mutton, and vegetables.

Irish Stew may also refer to:

- Irish Stew!, a novel by Andrew M. Greeley
- Irish Stew of Sindidun, or Irish Stew, a Serbian celtic rock band
