= Nuala Anne McGrail series =

Series of mystery novels

Nuala Anne McGrail
- Irish Gold; Irish Lace; Irish Whiskey; Irish Mist; Irish Eyes; Irish Love; Irish Stew! Irish Cream; Irish Crystal; Irish Linen; Irish Tiger; Irish Tweed
- Author: Andrew M. Greeley
- Country: United States
- Language: English
- Genre: Mystery
- Publisher: Forge (Tor)
- Published: 1994–2009
- Media type: Print

The Nuala Anne McGrail series of mystery novels were written by Roman Catholic priest and author Andrew M. Greeley.

The novels feature Nuala Anne McGrail and her husband, Dermot Michael Coyne.

== Novels ==
There are twelve novels in the series:

- Irish Gold (1994)
- Irish Lace (1996)
- Irish Whiskey (1998)
- Irish Mist (1999)
- Irish Eyes (2000)
- Irish Love (2001)
- Irish Stew! (2002)
- Irish Cream (2005)
- Irish Crystal (2006)
- Irish Linen (2007)
- Irish Tiger (2008)
- Irish Tweed (2009)

== Characters ==
=== Nuala Anne McGrail ===
Nuala Anne McGrail (née Moire Phioulaigh Ain Mac Griel, or Marie Fionnuala Anne McGrail) is a native of Carraroe, County Galway, Ireland popular and a very successful professional singer. She is married to Chicago native Dermot Michael Coyne. They met in Ireland but maintain their principal residence in Chicago. Nuala Anne is "fey," or psychic (one of the "dark ones"), and relies on her intuition to help her solve mysteries rooted in the past.

=== Dermot Michael Coyne ===
Dermot Michael Coyne is the American husband of Nuala Anne McGrail. He became an accidental millionnaire at the age of 25 while working at the Chicago Mercantile Exchange, by mistakenly reversing an order. Deciding that he had no business being in that business, he retired to write. He is the primary narrator of the stories and assists Nuala Anne in solving mysteries (his photographic memory helps with historic and other relevant details), though he describes his involvement as being merely her "spear carrier."

=== Their family ===
Mary Anne, better known as Nellicoyne, is an avid and skilled photographer, and is also fey like her mother.

Micheal Dirmuid, named after his father and known as the Mick, is a year-and-half younger than Nellicoyne. A sports fan who loves to play with trucks, he also usually has a sketchbook in his pocket and often translates his sketches to computer graphics.

Socra Marie, a year-and-a half younger than the Mick, was a "miracle" child, beating the odds to survive a very premature birth. She is small for her age and wears glasses but makes up for it in vitality and is often referred to as the "tiny terrorist" for her unintentional skill in wreaking havoc.

Josef Porrig (Joseph Patrick), known as Jopat, is two-and-a-half years younger than Socra Marie. He was described by one of Dermot's sisters as "just like his father, big, strong, good-looking, and useless."

Fiona, a white Irish wolfhound, formerly with the Garda, is now the self-appointed guardian of Nuala Anne and her family.

Maeve, Fiona's offspring, also white, is co-guardian of the family.

Rev. George ("Prester George") Coyne, is Dermot Michael's brother.

=== Other recurring characters ===
- Cardinal Sean Cronin
- Coadjutor Archbishop John Blackwood ("Blackie") Ryan
- Mike Casey
- Cindasue L. McLeod, United States Coast Guard Captain, neighbor and friend; mother of Nelliecoyne's best friend.
