= E. Michael Jones =

American traditionalist Catholic author

Personal life
- Born: 1948 (age 77–78)
- Children: 5
- Education: St. Joseph's College (bachelor's) Temple University (M.A., Ph.D.)
- Occupation: Author

Religious life
- Religion: Roman Catholic

E. Michael Jones (born 1948) is an American traditionalist Catholic author known for promoting the view that Jews are dedicated to propagating and perpetrating attacks on the Catholic Church. He taught at Saint Mary's College in Indiana after earning his Ph.D., but his intense anti-abortion writings published in local newspapers evoked the ire of his fellow English professors, and the college fired him after one year.

Several U.S.-based organizations, including the Catholic League for Religious and Civil Rights, the Southern Poverty Law Center, and the Anti-Defamation League, have criticized Jones for making antisemitic statements in his writings and public speeches. Polish scholar Agnieszka Graff has written that Jones garners respect in Poland as an author and lecturer, and that his writings are held in high regard in the Eastern European nation.

== Early life and education ==
Jones was born in 1948 and raised as a Catholic in a blue-collar Philadelphia neighborhood, by his stay-at-home mother, Florence, and his businessman father, Eugene. Jones attended the local Saint Joseph's College, a Catholic college in his home city, between 1966 and 1970. He became a lapsed Catholic during his college years, at the age of 20, criticizing the Church's proscription of contraception.

In 1969, he married Ruth Price; for their honeymoon, they sought to attend Woodstock, but failed to ultimately make it to the festival after becoming ensnared in traffic congestion while en route. After Jones had graduated from Saint Joseph's and after his wife had given birth to the couple's firstborn, the two moved to Rees, Germany in 1973, where E. Michael Jones worked as an English teacher. He would not remain lapsed for much longer: while still in Germany, his Catholic faith was revived after he read The Seven Storey Mountain, the autobiography of Trappist mystic Thomas Merton, and Jones became a stout defender of traditional Catholic theology.

Returning to academic studies, Jones pursued a Ph.D. in English Literature at Temple University, a state-related university in Philadelphia. After earning his doctoral degree, he became an assistant professor at Saint Mary's College, a women's college affiliated with the University of Notre Dame, teaching in the English department beginning in 1979. One year later, however, Saint Mary's College fired Jones. Jones had written a series of fiery op-eds in the local South Bend Tribune criticizing abortion, feminism, and paid child care, which angered his fellow professors; Jones attributes his firing to the reaction these writings.

== Writing career ==
After dismissal from the faculty of Saint Mary's College, Jones continued to live in South Bend. No longer teaching, he turned to writing as his career.

=== Fidelity and antimodernism ===
One year after his firing from Saint Mary's, Jones founded Fidelity, an antimodernist and traditionalist Catholic journal that decried liberal currents in the Catholic Church. He published the first issue of the journal in December 1981, from the basement of his South Bend home near the University of Notre Dame.

Jones wrote much of the content contained in the magazine; Patrick Allitt describes the journal's format as being composed of ordinary news stories about events affecting Catholics, as well as extended essays on what the journal's writers described the woes of modernity, with Jones himself contributing the majority of the analytical writing. In Fidelity, Jones developed his view that the creation of modernist works could be viewed as a means by which their creators could rationalize their own sexual misbehavior; among other items singled out by Jones, Jones applied this analysis to the anthropological work Coming of Age in Samoa, the Freudian psychoanalytic concept of the oedipus complex, and cubist works of Pablo Picasso.

Jones, according to Allitt, wrote that the Catholic intellectuals present at the Second Vatican Council had an inferiority complex when comparing themselves to their secular contemporaries. Rather than faithfully representing the proceedings of the Council, Jones argues, Catholic intellectuals engaged in a subversive embrace of modernism by willfully misconstruing the events of the Council in their books and reports thereof.

==== Criticism of the University of Notre Dame ====
Among other institutions, Jones singled out the University of Notre Dame as a particular target for his criticism. Writing in Fidelity, Jones published a series of investigations into the University of Notre Dame, calling the university's adherence to a Catholic identity into question. He rejected the university's claims that academic freedom justified allowing supporters of atheism, gay liberation, and legalization of abortion to speak on the Catholic campus, and he was intensely critical of Notre Dame's decision to permit research on the campus that used abortion-derived fetal tissue.

==== Our lady of Medjugorje ====
In 1988, Jones took to Fidelity to write about the apparitions of Our Lady of Medjugorje in the then-Yugoslavia. Jones traveled to Yugoslavia to interview several people with knowledge of the apparitions, including several children and priests involved in the veneration of Our Lady of Medjugorje. Jones left Yugoslavia convinced that the apparitions were false; in addition to protesting what he described as the emotional abuse of children in practices related to venerating Our Lady of Medjugorje, he decried the acceptance of the apparition as being the result of gullible people being deceived, noting then-Bishop of Dubrovnik Pavao Žanić's public declarations of sincere doubt regarding the veracity of the claims of miracles made at Medjugorie. Jones's writings thereof alienated a significant portion of Fidelity's reader base, prompting a large number of angry replies to be sent to Jones by his magazine's readers and causing Fidelity's to lose a substantial number of its subscribers. In The Smoke of Satan: Conservative and Traditionalist Dissent in Contemporary American Catholicism, Michael W. Cuneo of Fordham University's sociology and anthropology faculty described Fidelity's as being among the most disliked publications within the Catholic sphere in and around the year 1997.

=== Culture Wars ===
By 1995, the circulation of Fidelity, then still a mail-order-only publication, numbered only 5000 readers. That year, Jones launched Culture Wars, a second magazine.

== Monographs ==
In addition to his writings in journals and magazines, Jones has published over one dozen books.

=== Degenerate Moderns, Dionysos Rising, Living Machines, and Libido Dominandi ===
Jones, in a number of his books has written about his thesis that the telos of cultural modernity as being the justification of what he describes as deviant and degenerate sexual practices of intellectuals whom he says have helped to bring modernity about. Three such books. Degenerate Moderns: Modernity as Rationalized Sexual Misbehavior, Dionysos Rising: The Birth of Cultural Revolution out of the Spirit of Music, and Living Machines: Bauhaus Architecture as Sexual Ideology, were published in the as a trilogy between 1993 and 1995. The fourth such book, Libido Dominandi: Sexual Liberation and Political Control, was published in 2000.

==== Libido Dominandi: Sexual Liberation and Political Control ====
Libido Dominandi advances the thesis that, beginning in the Age of Enlightenment, a slow plot had begun to chip away at the moral order, culminating in the use of sexual liberation as a form of political control. Jones begins the book by examining the Illuminati and the Suppression of the Society of Jesus, and continues by examining people and moments in history that Jones sees as contributing to a decline in religious belief and public morality. Among these moments, Jones criticizes the development of Freudian psychoanalysis, arguing that the use of psychoanalysis was a means by which to subvert the Sacrament of Penance. By having laypeople learn the deep, dark secrets of others, Jones writes, people undergoing psychoanalysis were made vulnerable to manipulation; Jones characterizes the widespread use of psychoanalysis as a means of social control that caused deficiencies in the moral compass of Americans. Jones is particularly critical of Wilhelm Reich, a psychoanalyst who encouraged masturbation among the masses. The book, published in 2000, describes the peak of this enlightenment-era plot is the rise and presidency of Bill Clinton.

Lin S. Meyers, writing in Sexuality & Culture, describes the book as being "highly selective" in how it presents this history, describing the work as being marred by "logical problems in thinking" and overly emotive language while failing to provide adequate support for Jones's central thesis. Meyers, however credits Jones with presenting "interesting historical, philosophical and religious debates" in the book. Meyers is particularly critical of Jones's use of what Meyers describes as false dilemma and circular reasoning, providing as an example that Jones states "...either masturbation destroys your prayer life, or prayer destroys your ability to enjoy masturbation". Jonathan M. Smith, writing in, Ethics, Place & Environment, describes this quote as a broader part of what he sees as a striking example that illustrates intentional efforts by Reich to methodically undermine the Catholic imagination, reduce prayer, and consequently corrupt one's moral compass.

Edwin Dyga, writing in New Oxford Review, describes the book as particularly expounding a criticism of liberalism—that mob rule leads to tyranny—noting Jones's observation that "the tyrant can also be construed in a very literal sense as the man who rules over the people who are corrupted by their passions, through the agency of those very passions".

== Influence and public perception ==
Jones and his works are not popular in the United States, where his works are on the fringes of public intellectual discourse. Jones is well known among Polish conservative circles; Polish gender studies professor Agnieszka Graff described Jones in 2022 as having attained the status of a "minor celebrity" among the Polish right after Libido Dominandi was cited in German sociologist Gabriele Kuby's The Global Sexual Revolution: The Destruction of Freedom in the Name of Freedom. Graff describes Jones as "revered" in Poland, where his works and lectures have been well received. Jones has engaged in a number of speaking engagements in Poland; Jones, according to Graff, is admired for his speaking and is held in high esteem as an author in the country.

Jones has been criticized for making antisemitic remarks and publishing antisemitic writings. The Anti-Defamation League (ADL), a U.S.-based international Jewish non-governmental organization, and the U.S.-based Catholic League have described both Jones and several of his written works as antisemitic. The Southern Poverty Law Center (SPLC) lists Jones's Fidelity Press as being among "radical traditionalist" Catholic groups in a 2021 report, describing the set of groups as composing "the largest single group of serious antisemites in America". Graff concurs with the ADL and the SPLC, labeling Jones a "radical traditionalist Catholic" and describing him and his works beginning with Libido Dominandi as being antisemitic. Jones has repeatedly stated that he is not an antisemite; Jones says that his views of Jewish people are based on their religious beliefs in that that Jews reject Jesus as Christ, saying also that antisemitism refers to opposition to Jews due to one's hostile view of Jews as a race. After a lecture Jones was scheduled to give at Catholic University of America was cancelled following a complaint to the university from Mark Potok of the SPLC regarding Jones's views of Jewish people, Jones told the Washington Times in 2008 that he rejects racism, saying "there is nothing anti-Semitic about anything I have ever said".

== Personal life ==
Jones lives in South Bend, Indiana, with his wife, Ruth. As of 1997, the couple had five children together.

== See also ==
- Anti-Judaism in early Christianity
- Degenerate art
- Religious antisemitism
