= Splayed opening =

Wall opening which widens on one side

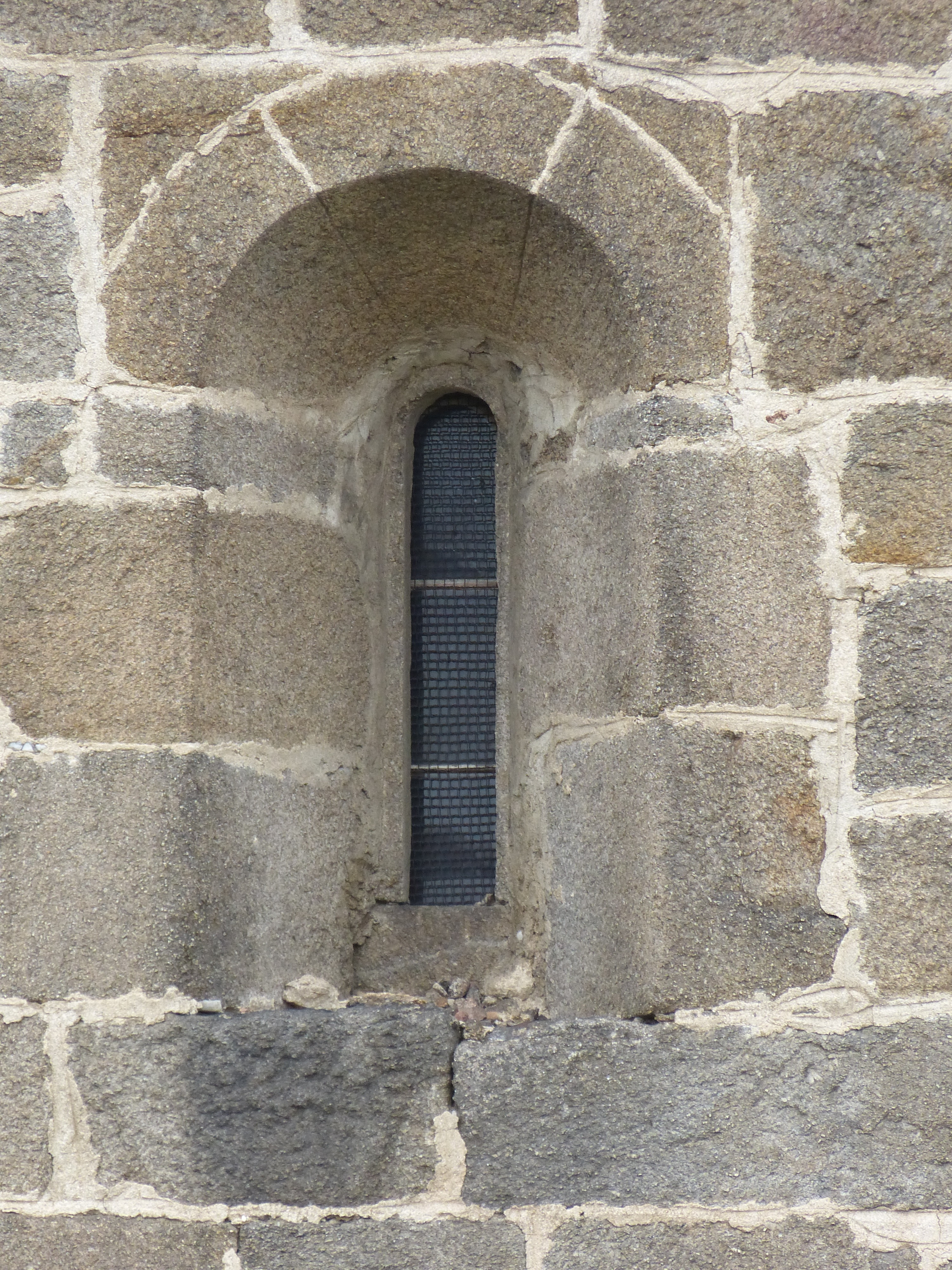
Splayed arch tops the splayed window opening

In architecture, a splayed opening (also splayed reveal) is a wall opening that is narrower on one side of the wall and wider on another. When used for a splayed window, it allows more light to enter the room. In fortifications, a splayed opening is used to broaden the arc of fire (cf. embrasure, loophole).

== Splayed arch ==
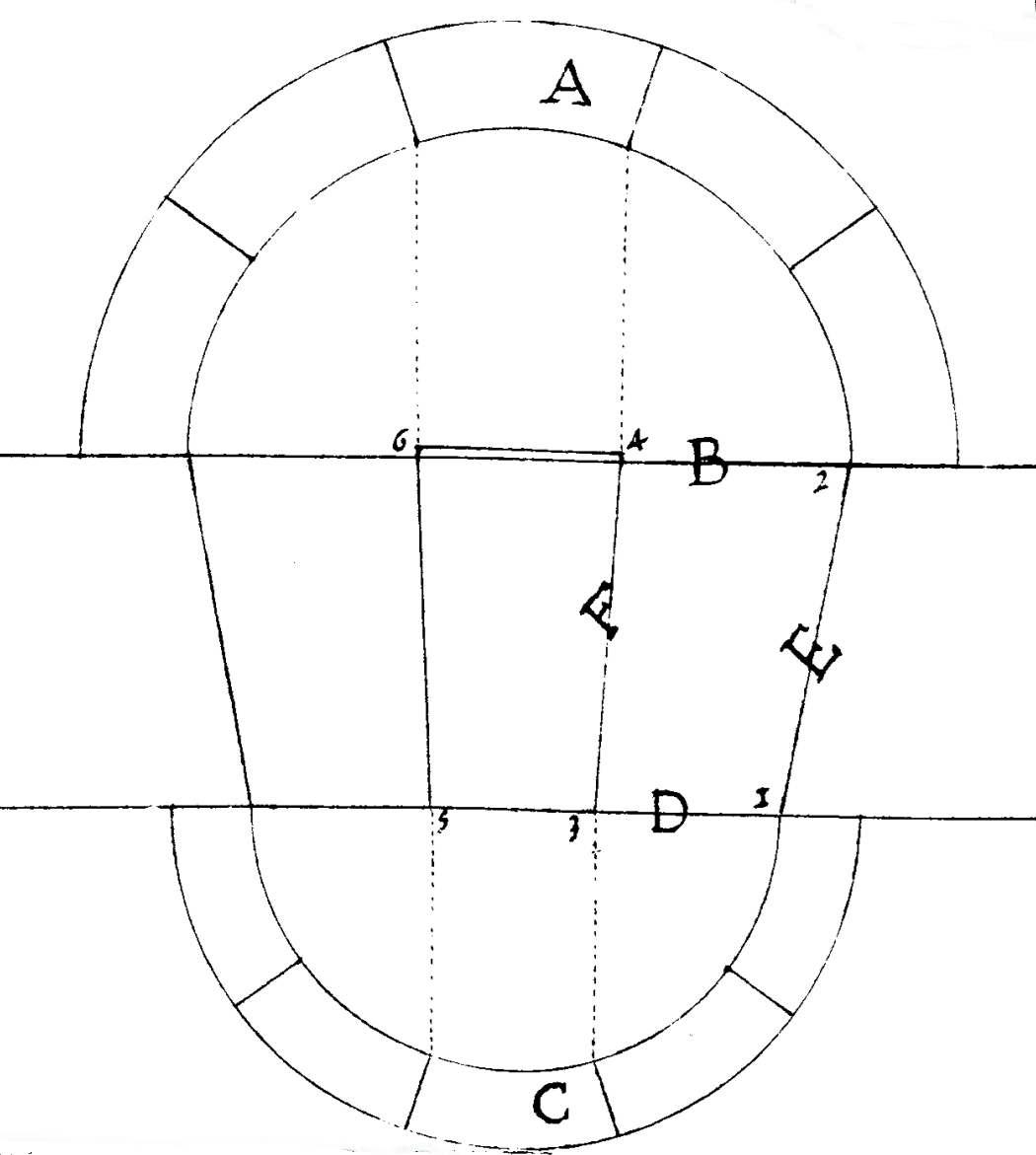
Rabattement drawing of a symmetrical splayed arch wall opening by Ginés Martínez de Aranda (c. 1600). B and D are the faces of the wall (plan view), also used as folding lines. A and C are elevations of the arch faces.

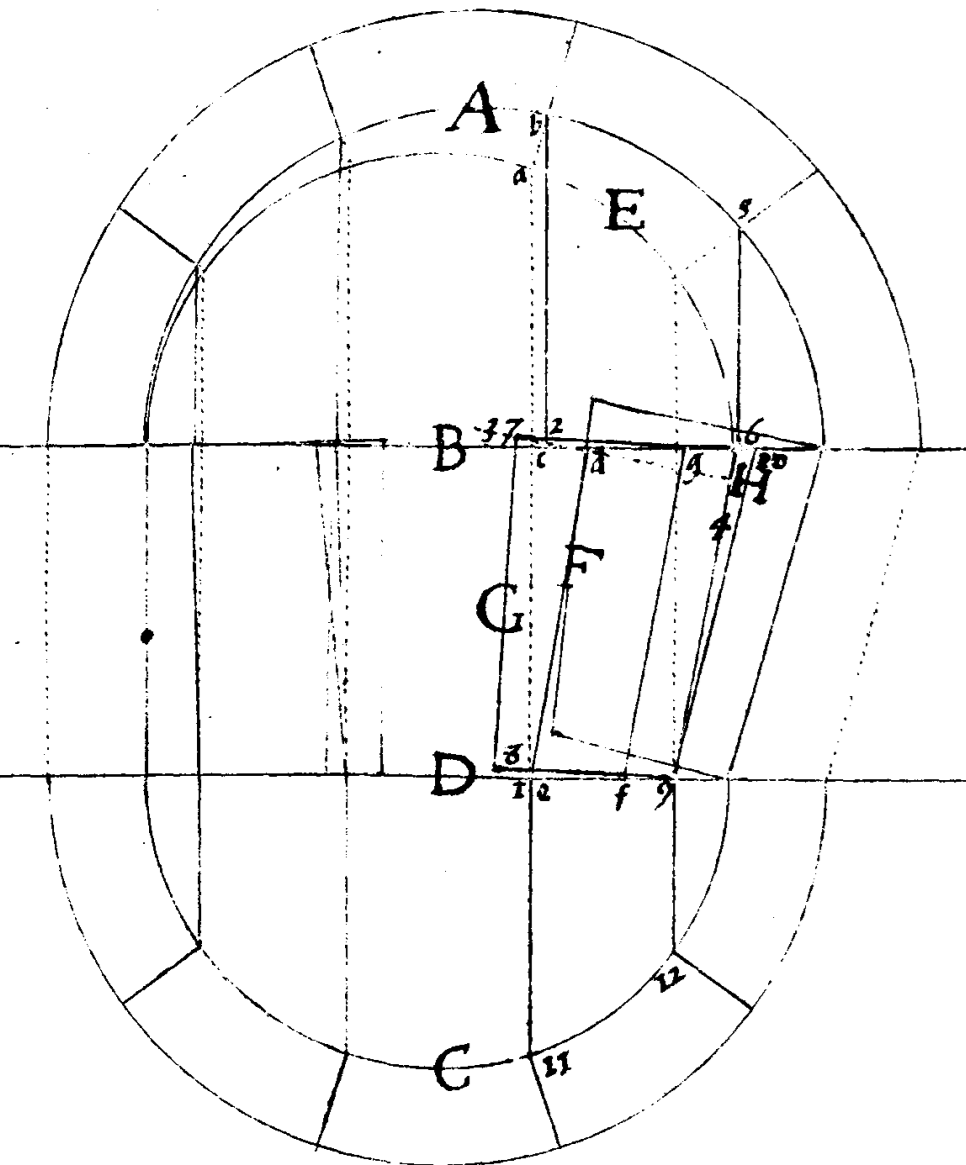
Rabattement drawing of an ox horn arch. B and D are again the faces of the wall, A and C represent intrados on elevations. Curve E is the C as observed from the A side (visible due to the splay). The space between A and E is the portion of intrados visible from the A side. The arch got its name from the shape of this space.

A splayed arch (also sluing arch) is an arch where the springings are not parallel ("splayed"), causing an opening on the exterior side of an arch to be different (usually wider) than the interior one. The intrados of a splayed arch is not generally cylindrical as it is for typical (round) arch, but has a conical shape.

José Calvo-López, a Spanish scholar of architecture, subdivides the splayed arches into symmetrical (where both springers form the same angles with the faces of the wall), and the ox horn arches, where one springer is orthogonal to the wall, and another is not, creating a "warped" intrados (the use of the term "ox horn" should not be confused with French: corne de vache, "cow's horn" — a design technique that was used for skew arch profiles).

== Double-splayed window ==
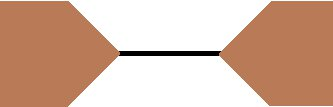
Double-splayed window (cross section)

Double-splayed windows, widening towards both wall faces, with the narrowest part in the middle of a wall, are common in the Anglo-Saxon architecture, although the use of this trait for dating is questionable, and English church buildings of the 12th century have such windows too.

== Portals ==
Widely splayed portals (also splayed jambs, as opposed to un-splayed "square jambs") were used in the Gothic architecture to display sculpture on the western facades of churches.

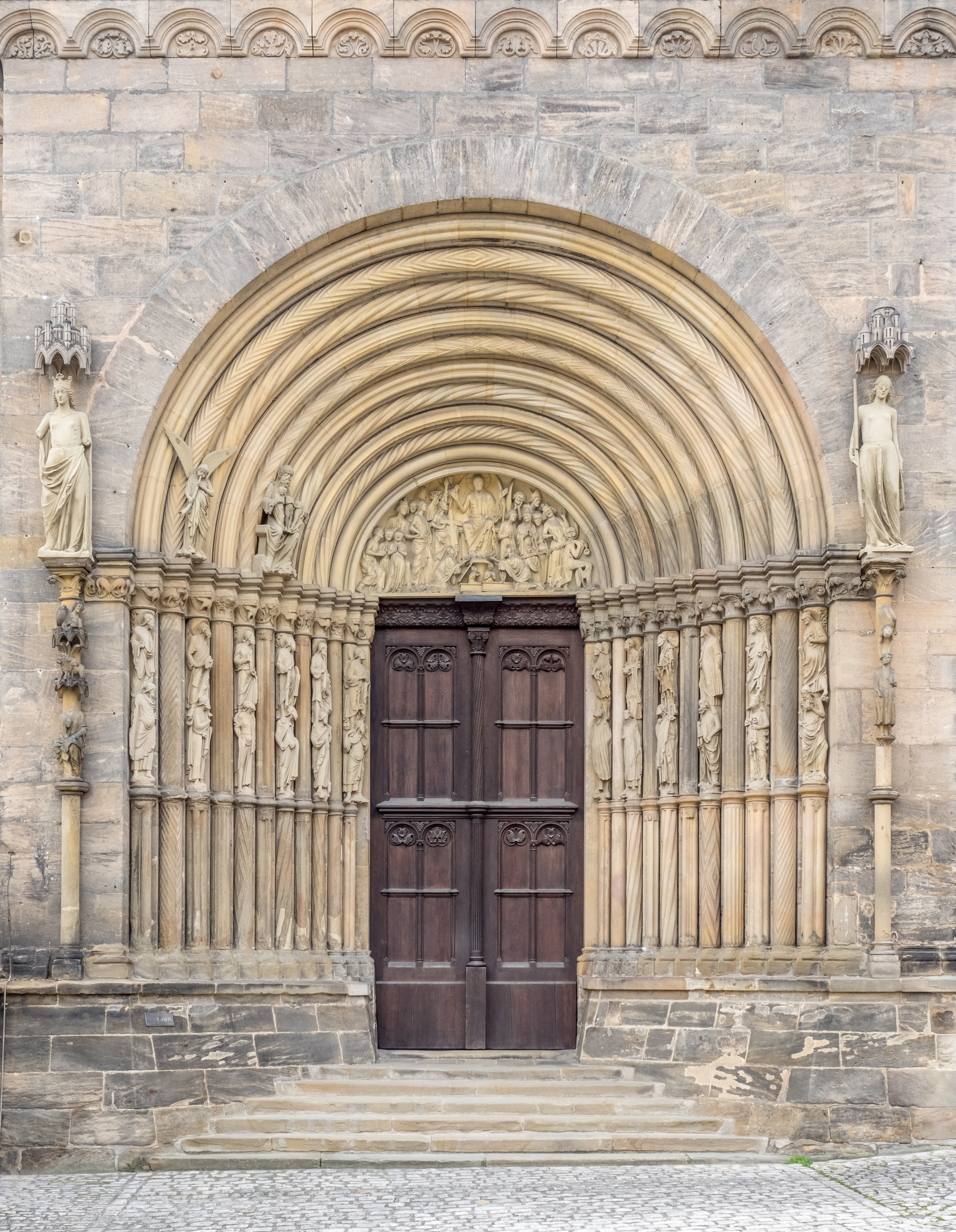
Prince's portal at the Bamberg Cathedral

== See also ==
- Hagioscope, a splayed opening for observation
- Squinch, a conical-shaped vault spanning the inner corner between two walls.

== Sources ==
- Blair, John (2005). The Church in Anglo-Saxon Society. EBSCO ebook academic collection. OUP Oxford. ISBN 978-0-19-822695-6.
- Calvo-López, José (2020). "Arches". Stereotomy. Vol. 4. Cham: Springer International Publishing. pp. 265–329. doi:10.1007/978-3-030-43218-8_6. ISBN 978-3-030-43217-1.
- Curl, J.S.; Wilson, S. (2015). "reveal, revel". The Oxford Dictionary of Architecture. Oxford Paperback Reference. Oxford University Press. ISBN 978-0-19-967498-5.
- Gem, R. (1984). "An Early Church of the Knights Templars at Shipley, Sussex". In Brown, R.A. (ed.). Anglo-Norman Studies VI: Proceedings of the Battle Conference 1983. Anglo-Norman Studies VI: Proceedings Of The Battle Conference 1983. Boydell Press. pp. 238–246. ISBN 978-0-85115-197-7.
- Lepage, J.D. (2023). "Splayed opening". Dictionary of Fortifications: An Illustrated Glossary of Castles, Forts, & Other Defensive Works from Antiquity to the Present Day. Pen & Sword Books. ISBN 978-1-3990-7225-0.
- Moore, Charles Herbert (1890). Development & Character of Gothic Architecture. Macmillan.
- "splayed arch". A Dictionary of Architecture and Landscape Architecture. Oxford. ISBN 978-0-19-860678-9.
