= LOTD =

LOTD may stand for:

- Lesson of the Day- used especially on Twitter
- Land of the Dead, the fourth movie in George A. Romero's "Dead Series"
- Linux on the Desktop, Linux on the Desktop
- Lord of the Dance (disambiguation)
- Laws of thermodynamics, physics laws that describe the specifics for the transport of heat and work in thermodynamic processes
- Legion of the Damned (band), a Dutch thrash/death metal band
