= Irish Tiger =

2008 book by Andrew Greeley

- Author: Andrew M. Greeley
- Language: English
- Series: Nuala Anne McGrail series
- Genre: Mystery novel
- Publisher: Forge Books (Tor)
- Publication date: 5 February 2008
- Publication place: United States
- Media type: Print (hardback)
- Pages: 320 pp (Hardback)
- ISBN: 0-7653-1588-2 (Hardback)
- OCLC: 173683787
- Dewey Decimal: 813/.54 22
- LC Class: PS3557.R358 I838 2008
- Preceded by: Irish Linen
- Followed by: Irish Tweed

Irish Tiger is the eleventh installment of the Nuala Anne McGrail series of mystery novels by Andrew Greeley.
