= God Game (novel) =

1986 novel by Andrew M. Greeley

- First edition
- Author: Andrew M. Greeley
- Cover artist: Boris Vallejo
- Language: English
- Genre: Science fiction novel
- Publisher: Warner Books
- Publication date: June 1986
- Publication place: United States
- Media type: Print (hardback and paperback)
- ISBN: 0-446-51264-8 (first edition, hardback)
- OCLC: 12973689
- Dewey Decimal: 813/.54 19
- LC Class: PS3557.R358 G63 1986

God Game is a science fiction novel written by Andrew Greeley. It was published in hardcover by Warner Books in 1986, with a paperback edition by Tor Books following in 1987.

== Plot ==
The book is told in first-person narrative by an unnamed Catholic priest who appears to be Andrew Greeley. The narrator makes frequent allusions to other works by the book's author, claiming them as his own, although the author denies this relationship when writing as himself in the book and refers to the narrator as a separate person.

The narrator volunteers to beta test a new type of computer game for a programmer friend named Nathan. Called Duke and Duchess (though the title is changed to God Game at the end of the book), the game puts the player in the role of God for a small swords and sorcery world. However, after a violent lightning storm, the narrator discovers that the game's crude CGA graphics have become live video, and that he is now responsible for the inhabitants of a small, but very real, world somewhere else in space and time – a world that threatens to run away from his control and into total chaos.

Reluctantly cast into the role of God (often referred to as "The Lord Our God"), the book's narrator continues playing the game and strives to create peace between the two warring sides. He finds that both sides pray to him or to the "Other Person", aka, God. His closest ally in trying to create this peace is Ranora, an ilel – a fairy-like character who is attributed with supernatural powers by the game's inhabitants but mostly seems to distract and inspire them through her flute-playing and dancing. The ilel has been assigned to the Duke, but dances wherever she wishes to go. The priest finds that it is "hell being God," as most of his characters, even when obeying, create further problems for him. Minor characters want to be major ones, then change their mind. Since he is not actually God and lacks omniscience, the narrator cannot always predict the outcome of his directives. There is comic relief provided by groups of dissidents who try to sabotage God's plans and whom he repeatedly smites by "divine" wrath using the game's controls.

As the narrator continues to play the game, he starts to see parallels between characters in the game and people in his own life with similar events happening on both sides of "Planck's Wall" as he refers to it. He starts to suspect that the universes are influencing each other in some way and questions his own responsibility in both. At times, characters from the game crossover to speak to him directly in his dreams, and he later finds evidence that they were actually there in his home, not mere figments. During the dreams, they have extended conversations that provide deeper insight into the personalities of the characters and their relationships to the narrator as God.

Finally, the narrator is able to broker peace in the game but, when he leaves the game for an extended period, those opposed to peace strive to undo all his good work. Ranora crosses the Wall to implore him to return, and he must work a miracle to save the Duke's life as the bad guys have convinced the Duchess he needs to be sacrificed in a pagan ritual.

Throughout the book, it is indicated that the game is later successfully marketed with its original CGA graphics and significant enhancements. The recordings of the gameplay that the narrator made are analyzed by teams of scientists but kept from the public due to concerns that the content would be too disturbing with its implications of a real alternate universe.

== Reception ==
In a review of God Game, John C. Bunnell described the novel as "a lively and absorbing yarn blending elements of intrigue, adventure, and comedy. Greeley's wide-ranging eye for detail reveals itself in character descriptions and in a very thoroughly created game milieu".

== Publication information ==
- Greeley, Andrew M. (2000). God Game. Forge Books. ISBN 978-0312877507.
