= Irish Lace =

1996 novel by Andrew M.Greeley

- First edition
- Author: Andrew M. Greeley
- Language: English
- Series: Nuala Anne McGrail series
- Genre: Mystery novel
- Publisher: Forge (Tor)
- Publication date: November 1996
- Publication place: United States
- Media type: Print (hardback & paperback)
- Pages: 303 pp (Hardback)
- ISBN: 0-312-86234-2 (Hardback)
- OCLC: 34776089
- Dewey Decimal: 813/.54 20
- LC Class: PS3557.R358 I8 1996
- Preceded by: Irish Gold
- Followed by: Irish Whiskey

Irish Lace is the second of the Nuala Anne McGrail series of mystery novels by Roman Catholic priest and author Father Andrew M. Greeley. It was published in 1996 by Forge.
