= Irish Crystal =

Book by Andrew Greeley

- First edition
- Author: Andrew M. Greeley
- Language: English
- Series: Nuala Anne McGrail series
- Genre: Mystery novel
- Publisher: Forge Books (Tor)
- Publication date: 7 February 2006
- Publication place: United States
- Media type: Print (hardback & paperback)
- Pages: 304 pp (Hardback)
- ISBN: 0-7653-0336-1 (Hardback)
- OCLC: 60500308
- Dewey Decimal: 813/.54 22
- LC Class: PS3557.R358 I735 2006
- Preceded by: Irish Cream
- Followed by: Irish Linen

Irish Crystal is the ninth of the Nuala Anne McGrail series of mystery novels by Roman Catholic priest and author Father Andrew M. Greeley.
