= Irish Love =

Mystery novel by Andrew Greeley

- First edition
- Author: Andrew M. Greeley
- Cover artist: Michael Koelsch
- Language: English
- Series: Nuala Anne McGrail series
- Genre: Mystery novel
- Publisher: Forge (Tor)
- Publication date: January 2001
- Publication place: United States
- Media type: Print (hardback & paperback)
- Pages: 301 pp (Hardback)
- ISBN: 0-312-87187-2 (Hardback)
- OCLC: 45086833
- Dewey Decimal: 813/.54 21
- LC Class: PS3557.R358 I825 2001
- Preceded by: Irish Eyes
- Followed by: Irish Stew!

Irish Love is the sixth of the Nuala Anne McGrail series of mystery novels by Roman Catholic priest and author Father Andrew M. Greeley. The cover art was illustrated by Michael Koelsch.
