= Rabattement (drafting) =

Rotation of a 2D object out of one plane and into another

A development of Rubik's Cube produced by successive rabattements of its faces onto a single plane. All faces and relative position of colors are visible in one drawing

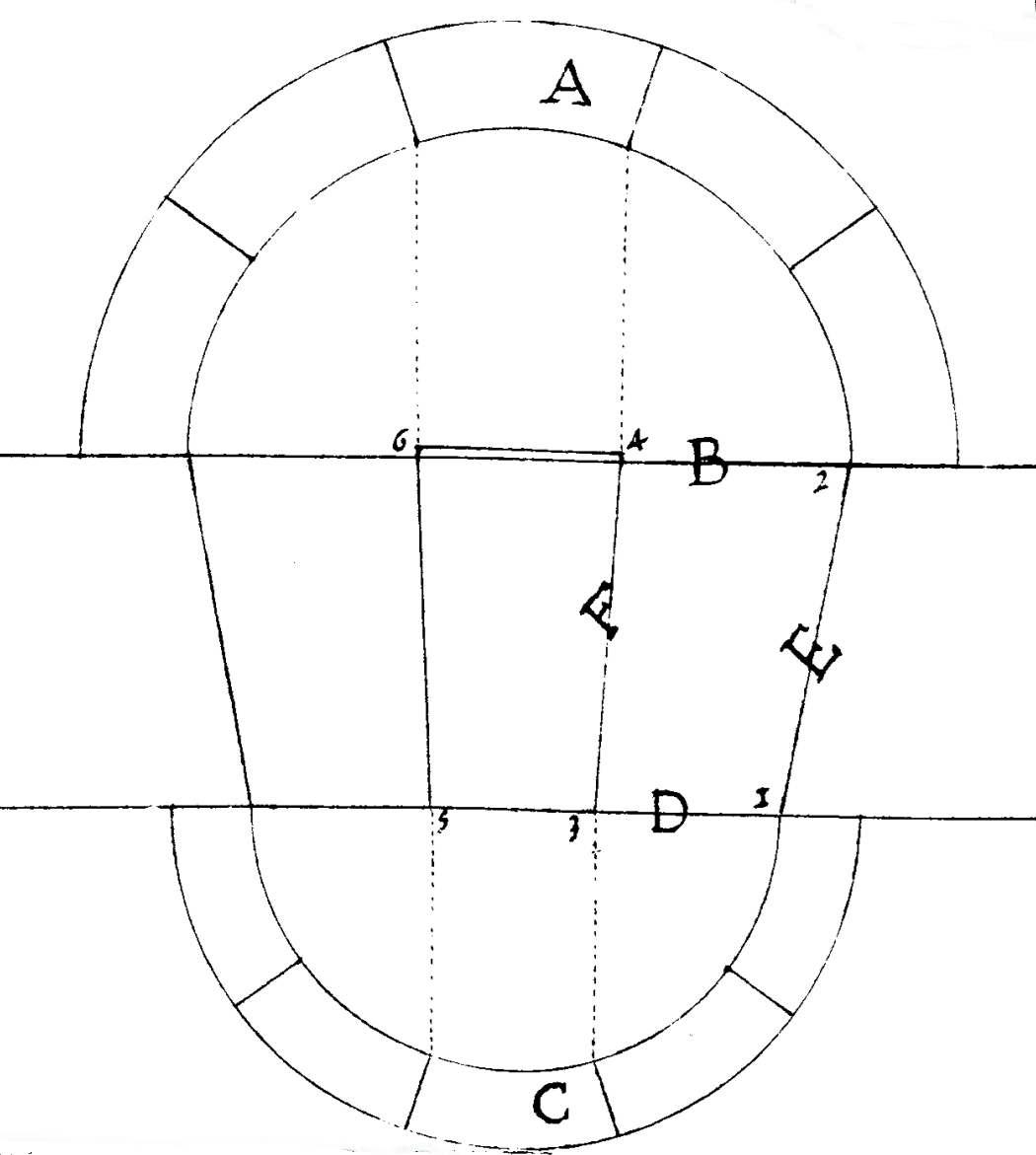
A rabattement drawing of a splayed arch (c. 1600). Lines B and D are the faces of the wall (plan view), also used as folding lines. A and C are elevations of the arch faces on both sides of the wall

Rabattement (also rabatment) is a rotation of a planar object around a folding line (using the line like a hinge) in order to align the object with another plane. Rabattement is used in technical drawings to produce developments (patterns, templates). In these drawings the object is "unfolded" to lay flat on a plane so it can be represented in entirety. The term originates from French rabbatement 'an act of lowering', due to the typical alignment plane being the horizontal one, although a vertical plane is sometimes used in elevation.

The technique of rabattement is very old: the archaic paintings that predate Antiquity used similar methods to achieve "intellectual realism" (as opposed to "visual realism" of later times) by unfolding the object to represent its hidden sides.

Rabattement was extensively used by stonemasons in the construction drawings, and, together with projection plane, evolved into a method of descriptive geometry. Descriptive geometry manuals sometimes use the term "rotation" when discussing moving points and lines, reserving "rabattement" for shapes and planes, but in practice both operations are identical.

The goal of the rabattement operation is to represent the true shape and size of a face of an object (this is impossible to do with orthographic projection if the shape of interest is inclined with respect to all planes of projection).

== Sources ==
- Calvo-López, José (2020). "Problems". Stereotomy. Vol. 4. Cham: Springer International Publishing. pp. 573–642. doi:10.1007/978-3-030-43218-8_12. ISBN 978-3-030-43217-1.
- Olivier, Laurent (2020-08-31). "In the eye of the dragon: how the ancient Celts viewed the world" (PDF). In Martin, Toby F; Morrison, Wendy (eds.). Barbaric Splendour. Oxford: Archaeopress Access Archaeology. pp. 18–32. ISBN 978-1-78969-659-2. OCLC 1156994415.
- Paynter, J.E. (1921). Practical geometry for builders and architects. London: Chapman & Hall. pp. 204–210.
