= Irish Mist (novel) =

- First edition
- Author: Andrew M. Greeley
- Language: English
- Series: Nuala Anne McGrail series
- Genre: Mystery novel
- Publisher: Forge (Tor)
- Publication date: March 1999
- Publication place: United States
- Media type: Print (hardback & paperback)
- Pages: 319 pp (Hardback)
- ISBN: 0-312-86569-4 (Hardback)
- OCLC: 40218757
- Dewey Decimal: 813/.54 21
- LC Class: PS3557.R358 I83 1999
- Preceded by: Irish Whiskey
- Followed by: Irish Eyes

Irish Mist is the fourth of the Nuala Anne McGrail series of mystery novels by Roman Catholic priest and author Father Andrew M. Greeley.
