= The Cardinal Sins =

1981 novel by Andrew Greeley

- First edition cover
- Author: Andrew Greeley
- Publisher: Warner Books
- Publication date: May 4, 1981
- ISBN: 1-615-58332-7

The Cardinal Sins is a 1981 novel by American author and priest Andrew Greeley.

== Plot summary ==
Lifelong friends and occasional rivals, Kevin Brennan and Patrick Donahue enter seminary together, but their lives soon diverge dramatically. Brennan achieves success as a scholar but often finds himself at odds with his superiors in the Church. By contrast, the ambitious Donahue rises steadily through the Church hierarchy, only to fall prey to the temptations of lust and power.
