= The Search for Maggie Ward =

1991 novel by Andrew Greeley

- First edition (publ. Warner Books)
- Author: Andrew Greeley
- Language: English
- Publisher: Warner Books
- Publication date: 1991
- ISBN: 0-446-51476-4 (first edition)
- Dewey Decimal: 813.54
- LC Class: PS3557.R358 S4

The Search for Maggie Ward is a 1991 novel by Andrew Greeley which details the quest of one man to find his bride, Maggie Ward, who has inexplicably vanished from their new home in a remote Arizona town.

== Reception ==
Reviewing the book, Michael A. Acquaviva described it as "on balance, another nice Andrew Greeley romantic story".
