= Irish Gold =

- First edition
- Author: Andrew M. Greeley
- Illustrator: Ellisa H. Mitchell
- Cover artist: Jeffrey Terreson
- Language: English
- Series: Nuala Anne McGrail series
- Genre: Mystery novel
- Publisher: Forge (Tor)
- Publication date: November 1994
- Publication place: United States
- Media type: Print (hardback & paperback)
- Pages: 334 pp (Hardback)
- ISBN: 0-312-85813-2 (Hardback)
- OCLC: 30913253
- Dewey Decimal: 813/.54 20
- LC Class: PS3557.R358 I75 1994
- Followed by: Irish Lace

Irish Gold is the first of the Nuala Anne McGrail series of mystery novels by Roman Catholic priest and author Father Andrew M. Greeley. The title "Irish Gold" refers to the gold allegedly accepted by Roger Casement in order to finance the resistance against the English crown.
