= Angel-lights =

Architectural term

Angel-lights, in architecture, are the upper panes of glass or "lights'" in a curved window frame, next to the springing. Probably a corruption of the word angle lights, as the structures are nearly triangular.
