= Irish Cream (novel) =

- First edition
- Author: Andrew M. Greeley
- Cover artist: Michael Koelsch
- Language: English
- Series: Nuala Anne McGrail series
- Genre: Mystery novel
- Publisher: Forge Books (Tor)
- Publication date: 27 January 2005
- Publication place: United States
- Media type: Print (hardback & paperback)
- Pages: 320 pp (Hardback)
- ISBN: 0-7653-0335-3
- OCLC: 56128328
- Dewey Decimal: 813/.54 22
- LC Class: PS3557.R358 I73 2005
- Preceded by: Irish Stew!
- Followed by: Irish Crystal

Irish Cream is the eighth of the Nuala Anne McGrail series of mystery novels by Roman Catholic priest and author Father Andrew M. Greeley. It takes place in Chicago, Illinois in the present day, though the novel depicts flashbacks to events that took place in Donegal in the nineteenth century. The novel deals with themes such as Catholicism, psychic powers, celibacy, family, and Ireland–United Kingdom relations. The title refers the sense of elitism that certain people enjoy when they are the crème de la crème of society. The book's cover art was illustrated by Michael Koelsch.

== Plot summary ==
The novel continues the story of Dermot Michael Coyne and his wife, Nuala Anne McGrail. They now have three children: Mary Margaret (called "Nelliecoyne"), Michael Dermod (called "The Mick"), and Socra Marie (often referred to, in Dermot's personal narration, as the "Tiny Terrorist" or some variation on that title). They also have two dogs, named Fiona and Maeve.

Dermot and Nuala decide to employ Damian Thomas O'Sullivan, the youngest son of John Patrick "Jackie" O'Sullivan, as a caretaker for their dogs. However, upon employing Damian, Dermot and Michael find out that Damian is on probation for allegedly running over a man in a traffic collision, and that Damian is also generally disliked by his entire family. Dermot and Nuala become determined to prove Damian's innocence, much to the contempt of John O'Sullivan, who treats Damian as inferior because Damian chose to be a painter rather than pursue a more serious profession.

Throughout the novel, Dermot reads the journal of Reverend Richard James Lonigan, a nineteenth century priest in Donegal. Lonigan dealt with two stressful issues in his life: strained relations between the Irish citizens of Donegal and the British officials who patrolled the area; and a strong attraction to his housekeeper, a widow named Mrs. O'Flynn. In the journals Lonigan wrote that one man in Donegal was killed and another was wounded, both by gunshot. In both cases the assassin is not revealed.

Nuala, who is believed to be "fey", claims that she knows the solution to both mysteries: who really ran over the man with the O'Sullivan car, and who shot the two people in Donegal. At the end of the novel she tells Dermot which people committed the crimes, although her theories cannot be proven. Dermot's sister, Cindy, defends Damian successfully in court, thus clearing Damian's name.
