= Lord of the Dance =

Lord of the Dance may refer to:

== Personalities ==
- Nataraja, Shiva in his dancing posture
- Lord of the Dance, a title given to Jesus Christ in some musical adaptations
- Rudolf Nureyev, ballet star, nicknamed Lord of the Dance

== Literature ==
- Lord of the Dance (novel), a 1984 novel by Father Andrew Greeley

== Music ==
- "Lord of the Dance" (hymn), a hymn written by Sydney Carter in 1963
  - "Tomorrow Shall Be My Dancing Day", a traditional song that the "Lord of the Dance" hymn is based on
- Lord of the Dance (Franciscus Henri album) (1976)
- Lord of the Dance (musical), an Irish musical and dance production
  - Lord of the Dance, an album composed by Ronan Hardiman for the above production
  - A nickname for Michael Flatley, star of the above production
- "Lord of the Dance", a song by Steven Curtis Chapman from the album Signs of Life
- "Lord of the Dance", a song by Chris Clark from the album Clarence Park

== See also ==
- "Lard of the Dance", a 1998 episode of The Simpsons
