= Andrew Greeley =

American novelist (1928–2013)

The Reverend Dr. Andrew Greeley
- Born: February 5, 1928; Oak Park, Illinois, US
- Died: May 29, 2013 (aged 85); Chicago, Illinois, US
- Occupations: Priest, author
- Years active: 1966–2009

Ecclesiastical career
- Religion: Christianity
- Church: Roman Catholic Church
- Ordained: 1954
- Congregations served: Christ the King Parish, Chicago
- Website: agreeley.com

Andrew Moran Greeley (February 5, 1928 – May 29, 2013) was an American Catholic priest, sociologist, journalist and novelist. He was a professor of sociology at the University of Arizona and the University of Chicago, and a research associate with the National Opinion Research Center (NORC). For many years, Greeley wrote a weekly column for the Chicago Sun-Times and contributed regularly to The New York Times, the National Catholic Reporter, America and Commonweal.

== Life and career ==
Greeley was born into a large Irish Catholic family in Oak Park, Illinois (a suburb of Chicago) in 1928. He grew up during the Great Depression in Chicago's Austin neighborhood, where he attended St. Angela Elementary School, and by the second grade, he knew that he wanted to be a priest. After studying at Archbishop Quigley Preparatory Seminary in Chicago, Greeley received an AB degree from St. Mary of the Lake Seminary in Chicago in 1950, a Bachelor of Sacred Theology (STB) in 1952, and a Licentiate of Sacred Theology (STL) in 1954, when he was ordained for the Archdiocese of Chicago.

From 1954 to 1964, Greeley served as an assistant pastor at Christ the King parish in Chicago, during which time he studied sociology at the University of Chicago. His first book, The Church in the Suburbs (1958), was drawn from notes a sociology professor had encouraged him to take describing his experiences. He received a Master of Arts in 1961 and a PhD in 1962. His doctoral dissertation dealt with the influence of religion on the career plans of 1961 college graduates. At various times, Greeley was a professor at the University of Arizona, the University of Illinois at Chicago and the University of Chicago. He was denied tenure by the University of Chicago in 1973, despite having been a faculty member there for a decade and having published dozens of books; he attributed the denial to anti-Catholic prejudice, although a colleague said his cantankerous temperament was more to blame. In 1991, he was granted a professorship in social science at the university.

== Sociology ==
As a sociologist, he published a large number of influential academic works during the 1960s and 1970s, including Unsecular Man: The Persistence of Religion (1972) and The American Catholic: A Social Portrait (1977). Over the course of his career, he authored more than 70 scholarly books, largely focusing on the Roman Catholic Church in the United States. His early work challenged the widespread assumption that Catholics had low college attendance rates, showing that white Catholics were in fact more successful than other whites in obtaining college undergraduate and graduate degrees, which he attributed to what he called the high-quality education Catholics received in parochial schools. He also studied how religion influenced the political behavior of ethnic Catholics, and he was one of the first scholars to document the sociological effects of the Second Vatican Council's reforms on American Catholics.

In the early 1970s, the U.S. bishops commissioned him to write a profile of the American priesthood. He completed a two-year survey in 1972, reporting that dissatisfaction among the priests was widespread; but the bishops rejected his findings. Greeley said, "Honesty compels me to say that I believe the present leadership in the church to be morally, intellectually and religiously bankrupt."

Greeley's sociological work was also viewed with suspicion by some of his fellow clerics, and his archbishop (later cardinal), John Cody, denied Greeley's request for a parish ministry. Greeley criticized Cody, calling him a "madcap tyrant" when Cody closed a number of inner-city schools.

== Interpreting American Catholicism ==
Greeley's biographer summarizes his interpretation:

He argued for the continued salience of ethnicity in American life and the distinctiveness of the Catholic religious imagination. Catholics differed from other Americans, he explained in a variety of publications, by their tendency to think in "sacramental" terms, imagining God as present in a world that was revelatory rather than bleak. The poetic elements in the Catholic tradition--its stories, imagery, and rituals--kept most Catholics in the fold, according to Greeley, whatever their disagreements with particular aspects of church discipline or doctrine. But Greeley also insisted on the disastrous impact of Humanae Vitae, the 1968 papal encyclical upholding the Catholic ban on contraception, holding it almost solely responsible for a sharp decline in weekly Mass attendance between 1968 and 1975. He believed that lay Catholics understood far better than their bishops that sex in marriage was intended by God to be joyous and playful, a true means of grace.

As described by John L. Allen Jr. of the National Catholic Reporter, Greeley became fascinated with what has been called the Catholic "analogical imagination", the idea that "visible, tangible things in the created order serve as metaphors for the divine, as opposed to the more textual and literal religious sensibility of Protestants and others." Greeley believed that it was this viewpoint that had led the church to be a pre-eminent patron of the arts through the centuries, allowing it to communicate through artistic imagery spiritual concepts that doctrinal texts alone could not. Greeley's appreciation for the spiritual power of art inspired him to begin writing works of fiction.

== Fiction ==
Greeley's literary output was such it was said that he "never had an unpublished thought". He said, "The only way I can write fiction is to keep those hours from 6:00 to 9:00 A.M. sacred." He published his first novel, The Magic Cup, in 1975, a fantasy tale about a young king who would lead Ireland from paganism to Christianity. A second novel, Death in April, followed in 1980.

His third novel, The Cardinal Sins (1981), was his first work of fiction to become a major commercial success. As one reviewer put it, The Cardinal Sins "did for the Catholic Church what The Godfather did for the mafia". The novel's principal characters were both priests—one a writer-sociologist (like Greeley), and the other a Cardinal who had broken the vow of celibacy. At the time of the book's release, Chicago's cardinal, John Cody, was the subject of allegations of having diverted hundreds of thousands of dollars from the Church to a mistress. Church officials accused Greeley of using the novel to attack Cardinal Cody, although Greeley denied the charges and told the New York Times that Cody was "a much better bishop ... and a much better human being" than the character in the novel.

The Cardinal Sins was followed by the Passover trilogy: Thy Brother's Wife (1982), Ascent into Hell (1983), and Lord of the Dance (1984). Thereafter, he wrote a minimum of two novels per year, on average. In 1987 alone, he produced four novels and two works of non-fiction. He once said that he wrote an average of 5,000 words per day, and was known to quip, "Why should I practice contraception on my ideas?"

The explicit treatment of sexuality in Greeley's novels was a source of controversy for some. The National Catholic Register said that Greeley had "the dirtiest mind ever ordained". Greeley responded to his critics by saying that "there is nothing wrong with sex" and that "at the most basic level, people learn from the novels that sex is good ... Then they get the notion that sexual love is a sacrament of God's love, that sexual love tells us something about God." He told one interviewer that his erotic writing was not pornography and that it was "less erotic than the Song of Songs in the scriptures". He insisted that from what they heard in confession from women, priests probably knew more about marriage than most married men; and he drew on this knowledge to write a marital advice book he called Sexual Intimacy (1988).

At the height of the Catholic Church sexual abuse scandal, Greeley wrote The Priestly Sins (2004), a novel about a young priest who is exiled to an insane asylum and then to an academic life because he reports abuse that he has witnessed. His book The Making of the Pope (2005) was intended as a follow-up to his The Making of the Popes 1978. The Making of the Pope (2005) was a first-hand account of the coalition-building process by which the conservative Cardinal Joseph Ratzinger ascended to the papacy as Benedict XVI. Greeley also dabbled in science fiction, writing the novels God Game and The Final Planet.

Greeley wrote about the spiritual life in his prayer journals "that revealed a man who most of all wanted to love God and let people know that God was a Tremendous Lover who loved them as if He loved them alone and loved everyone as if all of them were one". "Love Affair" (1992) was his first prayer journal, a winner of the Catholic Association book award in the spiritual category, followed by "Sacraments of Love" (1994), "Windows" (1995), "I Hope You're Listening, God" (1997), and "Letters To A Loving God" (2002). The prayer journal was neither a book of prayers nor a book about prayer but rather an experience of praying, to dialogue with God. It is prayer as it happens. He said that writing out prayers on a computer screen for his journals "are the best way to pray I've yet discovered." Thus, paraphrasing a famous quote about him, it might be said he "never had an unpublished prayer". Leach said, "The prayer journals were among his favorite books."

Greeley wrote his first major collection of poetry entitled The Sense of Love (1992), taking his place among the priest poets of the Anglo-Roman tradition, as he examined the love relationship between God and humanity on the levels of eros (sexual), philos (social), and agape (spiritual) (Robert McGovern, foreword, The Sense of Love, 1992, pp. viii-xi).

Greeley wrote numerous mystery novels, including one series about Father "Blackie" Ryan and another about the Nuala Anne McGrail character.

== Politics ==
Politically, Greeley was an outspoken critic of the George W. Bush administration and the Iraq War, and a strong supporter of immigration reform. His book titled A Stupid, Unjust, and Criminal War: Iraq 2001–2007 (2007) was critical of the rush by the Bush administration to start the Iraq War and the consequences of that war for the United States. Garry Wills wrote, "Andrew Greeley shows that Jesus is the Prince of Peace, not a Captain of War."

== Priesthood ==
Reflecting on his life's work, Greeley told the Chicago Tribune in 1992, "I'm a priest, pure and simple ... The other things I do — sociological research, my newspaper columns, the novels I write — are just my way of being a priest. I decided I wanted to be one when I was a kid growing up on the West Side. I've never wavered or wanted to be anything but."

== Philanthropy ==
Greeley was probably the best-selling priest in history, with an estimated 250,000 readers who would buy almost every novel he published, probably generating at least $110 million in gross income by 1999. He was able to live comfortably in Chicago's John Hancock Center, but he donated most of his earnings to the Church and other charities. In 1984, he contributed $1 million to endow a chair in Roman Catholic Studies at the University of Chicago. In 1986, he established a $1 million private educational fund for scholarships and financial support to inner-city schools in the Chicago Archdiocese with a minority student body of more than 50%. He had originally offered the donation to the Archdiocese, but the then Archbishop of Chicago, Cardinal Joseph Bernardin, had declined the gift without ever publicly offering an explanation. In 2003, the Archdiocese accepted the $420,000 that still remained in the fund to bolster a newly established Catholic Schools Endowment Fund, providing scholarships for low-income students and for raising teachers' salaries in the Archdiocese's schools. Greeley also funded an annual lecture series, "The Church in Society", at St. Mary of the Lake Seminary, Mundelein, Illinois, where he had earned his S.T.L. in 1954.

In 2008, he donated several thousand dollars to the 2008 presidential campaign of Barack Obama, who was then serving as a U.S. Senator representing Illinois, although Greeley predicted that racism would lead to Obama's defeat.

== Injury and death ==
Greeley suffered skull fractures in a fall in 2008 when his clothing got caught on the door of a taxi as it pulled away; he was hospitalized in critical condition. He remained in poor health for the rest of his life and died on May 29, 2013, at his Chicago home. He was 85.

== Honors ==
Greeley was awarded honorary degrees from the University of Arizona, Bard College (New York State) and the National University of Ireland, Galway. In 1981, he received the F. Sadlier Dinger Award, which is presented each year by educational publisher William H. Sadlier, Inc. in recognition of his outstanding contribution to the ministry of religious education in America.

== Non-fiction ==
- The Social Effects of Catholic Education (1961)
- Religion and Career: A Study of College Graduates (1963)
- And Young Men Shall See Visions (1964)
- Letters to Nancy (1964)
- The Hesitant Pilgrim: American Catholicism After the Council (1966)
- The Education of Catholic Americans (1966)
- The Catholic Experience: A Sociologist's Interpretation of the History of American Catholicism (1967)
- The Changing Catholic College (1967)
- Uncertain Trumpet: The Priest in Modern America (1968)
- The Crucible of Change: The Social Dynamics of Pastoral Practice (1968)
- What Do We Believe? The Stance of Religion in America (1968)
- The Student in Higher Education (1968)
- From Backwater to Mainstream: A Profile of Catholic Higher Education (1969)
- Religion in the Year 2000 (1969)
- A Future to Hope in: Socio-religious Speculations (1969)
- Life for a Wanderer (1969)
- The Friendship Game (1970)
- Recent Alumni and Higher Education: A Survey of College Graduates (1970)
- Can Catholic Schools Survive? (1970)
- Why Can't They Be Like Us? (1971)
- The Jesus Myth (1971)
- American Priests. Chicago: National Opinion Research Center (1971)
- The Denominational Society (1972)
- Unsecular Man (1972)
- Priests in the U.S.: Reflections on a Survey (1972)
- That Most Distressful Nation: The Taming of the American Irish (1972)
- The Catholic Priest in the U.S.: Sociological Investigations (1972)
- Ethnicity in the U.S.: A Preliminary Reconnaissance (1974)
- Ecstasy: A Way of Knowing (1974)
- Building Coalitions (1974)
- The Sociology of the Paranormal (1975)
- The Sinai Myth (1975)
- Love and Play (1975)
- The Great Mysteries: An Essential Catechism (1976)
- Ethnicity, Denomination and Inequality (1976)
- The American Catholic: A Social Portrait (1977)
- No Bigger Than Necessary (1977)
- Neighborhood. New York (1977)
- Ugly little secret : anti-Catholicism in North America (1977)
- The Making of the Popes (1978)
- Crisis in the Church: A Study of Religion in America (1979)
- Ethnic Drinking Subcultures (1980)
- The Young Catholic Family (1980)
- The Religious Imagination (1981)
- Young Catholics in the United States and Canada (1981)
- The Irish Americans: The Rise to Money and Power (1981)
- Parish, Priest and People (1981)
- Catholic High Schools and Minority Students (1982)
- The Bottom Line Catechism (1982)
- Religion: A Secular Theory (1982)
- The Catholic Why? Book (1983)
- The Dilemma of American Immigration: Beyond the Golden Door (1983)
- Angry Catholic Women (1984)
- How to Save the Catholic Church (1984)
- American Catholics Since the Council (1985)
- Confessions of a Parish Priest (1986)
- Catholic Contributions: Sociology & Policy (1987)
- An Andrew Greeley Reader: Volume One (1987)
- The Irish Americans: The Rise to Money and Power (1988)
- When Life Hurts: Healing Themes from the Gospels (1988)
- God in Popular Culture (1988)
- Sexual Intimacy: Love and Play (1988)
- Myths of Religion: An inspiring investigation into the nature of God and a journey to the boundaries of faith (1989); ISBN 0-446-38818-1
- Religious Change in America (1989)
- The Catholic Myth: The Behavior and Beliefs of American Catholics (1990)
- The Bible and Us (1990)
- Year of Grace: A Spiritual Journal (1990)
- Faithful Attraction: Discovering Intimacy, Love, and Fidelity in American Marriage (1991)
- Love Affair: A Prayer Journal (1992) Winner of the Catholic Press Association Book Award in the spiritual category, among his favorites.
- The Sense of Love (1992)
- Sacraments of Love: A Prayer Journal (1994)
- Windows: A Prayer Journal (1995)
- Sex: The Catholic Experience (1995)
- Religion as Poetry (1995)
- Sociology and Religion: A Collection of Readings (1995)
- Common Ground (1996)
- Forging a Common Future (1997)
- I Hope You're Listening God: A Prayer Journal (1997)
- Furthermore! (1999)
- The Mysteries of Grace
- The Catholic Imagination (2000); ISBN 0-520-23204-6
- Book of Love (2002)
- Letters To A Loving God: A Prayer Journal (2002)
- The Great Mysteries: Experiencing Catholic Faith from the inside Out (2003)
- God in the Movies (2003), with Albert J. Bergesen
- The Catholic Revolution: New Wine, Old Wineskins, and the Second Vatican Council (2004); ISBN 0-520-24481-8
- Priests: A Calling in Crisis (2004)
- The Making Of The Pope (2005)
- The Truth about Conservative Christians: What They Think and What They Believe (2006)
- Jesus: A Meditation on His Stories and His Relationships with Women (2007)
- A Stupid, Unjust and Criminal War: Iraq 2001-2007 (2007) He shows that "Jesus is the Prince of Peace, not a Captain of War." (Garry Wills)

== Bibliography ==
=== Fantasy and science fiction ===
- The Magic Cup (1975)
- God Game (1986)
- The Final Planet (1987)
- Angel Fire (1988)
- The Search for Maggie Ward (1991)
- Angel Light (1995)
- Contract With an Angel (1998)

=== The Passover Trilogy ===
- Thy Brother's Wife (1982)
- Ascent Into Hell (1983)
- Lord of the Dance (1984)

=== Father "Blackie" Ryan mysteries ===
- Virgin and Martyr (1985)
- Happy are the Meek (1985)
- Happy are the Clean of Heart (1986)
- Happy Are Those Who Thirst for Justice (1987)
- Happy Are the Merciful (1992)
- Happy Are the Peace Makers (1993)
- Happy Are the Poor in Spirit (1994)
- Happy Are Those Who Mourn (1995)
- Happy Are The Oppressed (1996)
- White Smoke (1996)
- The Bishop at Sea (1997)
- The Bishop and the Three Kings (1998)
- The Bishop and the Missing L-Train (2000)
- The Bishop and the Beggar Girl of St. Germain (2001)
- The Bishop in the West Wing (2002)
- The Bishop Goes to the University (2003)
- The Bishop in the Old Neighborhood (2005)
- The Bishop at the Lake (2007)
- The Archbishop in Andalusia (2008)

=== Nuala Anne McGrail mysteries ===
- Irish Gold (1994)
- Irish Lace (1996)
- Irish Whiskey (1998)
- Irish Mist (1999)
- Irish Eyes (2000)
- Irish Love (2001)
- Irish Stew! (2002)
- Irish Cream (2005)
- Irish Crystal (2006)
- Irish Linen (2007)
- Irish Tiger (2008)
- Irish Tweed (2009)

=== O'Malley Family saga ===
- Summer at the Lake (1997)
- A Midwinter's Tale (1998)
- Younger Than Springtime (1999)
- A Christmas Wedding (2000)
- September Song (2001)
- Second Spring (2003)
- Golden Years (2005)

=== Other ===
- Death in April (1980)
- The Cardinal Sins (1981)
- Angels of September (1985)
- Patience of a Saint (1987)
- Rite of Spring (1987)
- Love Song (1989)
- St. Valentine's Night (1989)
- Andrew Greeley's Chicago (1989)
- All About Women (1989)
- The Cardinal Virtues (1990)
- The Irish (1990)
- An Occasion of Sin (1991)
- Wages of Sin (1992)
- Fall from Grace (1993)
- Star Bright! (1997)
- The Priestly Sins (2004)
- Emerald Magic: Great Tales of Irish Fantasy (2004)
- The Senator and the Priest (2006)
- Home for Christmas (2009)

== Other work ==
Until his brain injury, Greeley's column on political, church and social issues appeared each Friday in the Chicago Sun-Times and each Sunday in the Daily Southtown, a southwest suburban Chicago newspaper published by the Sun-Times Media Group.
