= Irish Eyes =

- First edition
- Author: Andrew M. Greeley
- Cover artist: Michael Koelsch
- Language: English
- Series: Nuala Anne McGrail series
- Genre: Mystery novel
- Publisher: Forge Books (Tor)
- Publication date: 19 February 2000
- Publication place: United States
- Media type: Print (hardback & paperback)
- Pages: 320 pp (Hardback)
- ISBN: 0-312-86570-8 (Hardback)
- OCLC: 43245870
- Dewey Decimal: 813/.54 21
- LC Class: PS3557.R358 I74 2000
- Preceded by: Irish Mist
- Followed by: Irish Love

Irish Eyes is the fifth of the Nuala Anne McGrail series of mystery novels by Roman Catholic priest and author Father Andrew M. Greeley. The cover art was illustrated by Michael Koelsch.
