= Irish Linen =

Novel by Andrew Greeley

- First edition
- Author: Andrew M. Greeley
- Language: English
- Series: Nuala Anne McGrail series
- Genre: Mystery novel
- Publisher: Forge Books (Tor)
- Publication date: 6 February 2007
- Publication place: United States
- Media type: Print (hardback)
- Pages: 352 pp
- ISBN: 0-7653-1586-6
- OCLC: 72699609
- Dewey Decimal: 813/.54 22
- LC Class: PS3557.R358 I823 2007
- Preceded by: Irish Crystal
- Followed by: Irish Tiger

Irish Linen is the tenth of the Nuala Anne McGrail series of mystery novels by Roman Catholic priest and author Father Andrew M. Greeley.
