= Lord of the Dance (novel) =

1984 novel by Catholic priest Andrew Greeley

- First edition (publ. Warner Books)
- Author: Andrew Greeley
- Publisher: Warner Books
- Publication date: March 19, 1984

Lord of the Dance (1984) is a novel by American writer Andrew Greeley. It is the third in the Passover Trilogy. It is the story of a teenager, Noele Farrell, who Greeley has said represents a composite of Irish-American teenage women he has met.

== Plot introduction ==
Noele is the daughter of Roger, a college professor and candidate for public office with adulterous tendencies, and Irene, once a very promising bright young woman, and still beautiful, but clearly broken by years of a domestic life with a cheating husband. She is sometimes able to read the thoughts, and foresee the future, of those close to her.

== Plot summary ==
Noele becomes obsessed with her uncle, Danny Farrell, who has always been a black sheep of sorts in the family. Danny is believed to have died in an airplane flying over China while working for the CIA. Roger's mother, Brigid, is a powerful widow with a lot of dirty secrets. The family is an example of an Irish Catholic family's ascent into the upper middle class, perhaps even the upper class, after a few generations, reflecting a common theme of sociologist Greeley. However, aside from Danny, there have been other mysterious deaths in this family, and Noelle courageously probes this dark side of her ancestry, leading to the truth about who she really is.

Noele is clearly the most significant character in the book. Greeley has said that she is meant to embody the Church. She is a spunky girl who once takes over a church service with her guitar-playing rendition of the hymn "Lord of the Dance", much to the dismay of her folk group leader, and gives a spontaneous, powerful homily about life being a dance where God chooses the partners. Sometimes, however, God wants to dance alone, with just us.

== Major themes ==
It contains themes central to many of Greeley's novels, including the importance of Irish Catholicism as a fundamental element of Irish culture, and the idea that family loyalty can be both loving and realistic at the same time. Also included (as in many of Greeley's books) are the familiar elements of love, sex, and mystery.
