= Irish Stew! =

- First edition
- Author: Andrew M. Greeley
- Language: English
- Series: Nuala Anne McGrail series
- Genre: Mystery novel
- Publisher: Forge Books (Tor)
- Publication date: 6 March 2002
- Publication place: United States
- Media type: Print (hardback & paperback)
- Pages: 304 pp (Hardback)
- ISBN: 978-0-312-87188-8 (Hardback)
- Preceded by: Irish Love
- Followed by: Irish Cream

Irish Stew! is the seventh of the Nuala Anne McGrail series series of mystery novels by Roman Catholic priest and author Father Andrew M. Greeley.
