= Angel Light (novel) =

Novel by Andrew M. Greeley

- First edition
- Author: Andrew M. Greeley
- Language: English
- Publisher: Forge Books (Tor)
- Publication date: December 1995
- Publication place: United States
- Media type: Print (hardback & paperback)
- Pages: 352 pp (Hardback)
- ISBN: 0-312-86080-3 (Hardback)
- OCLC: 32780410
- Dewey Decimal: 813/.54 20
- LC Class: PS3557.R358 A743 1995
- Preceded by: Angel Fire (1988)

Angel Light is a novel by Roman Catholic priest and author Father Andrew M. Greeley. It is the second of a short series: currently three.

== Reviews ==
- Br, Mary (December 24, 1995). "NYTimes review". New York Times.
- Steinberg, Sybil S. (November 13, 1995). "Forecasts: Fiction". Publishers Weekly. 242 (46): 50. Abstract: Reviews the book `Angel Light,' by Andrew M. Greeley.
- Beauregard, Sue Ellen (November 15, 1995). "Upfront advance reviews: Adult fiction". Booklist. 92 (6): 515. Abstract: Reviews the book `Angel Light: An Old-Fashioned Love Story,' by Andrew M. Greeley.
