= Father John Blackwood "Blackie" Ryan =

John Blackwood Ryan
- First appearance: Virgin and Martyr
- Last appearance: The Archbishop in Andalusia
- Created by: Andrew Greeley

In-universe information
- Gender: Male
- Occupation: Priest
- Nationality: American

Father John Blackwood "Blackie" Ryan is the protagonist in a series of 17 mystery novels by Roman Catholic priest and author Father Andrew Greeley.

Fictionally, "Blackie" is a portly, little man. As the innocuous auxiliary bishop (under Cardinal Sean Cronin) and rector of the Holy Name Cathedral, Chicago, he travels the Archdiocese of Chicago and around the world (at Cardinal Cronin's "See to it, Blackwood!" charge) solving locked-room mysteries related to the Roman Catholic Church and its members.

== Overview ==
In his fictional biography, John Blackwood Ryan was born in 1945 to a large Irish-American family, ordained priest in 1970, made a Monsignor in 1983, and elevated to bishop in 1990. He is also a philosopher and author of fictional theology books about James Joyce and William James. He regards himself as both priest and philosopher.

Ryan introduces himself by saying, "Call me Blackie," (from "Call me Ishmael"—the first line in Moby-Dick); he is also called "Bishop Blackie." His siblings call him "Punk," and his nephews and nieces call him "Uncle Punk." Blackie's most common responses are "arguably" and "patently."

In the books, Blackie is not a fan of Cardinal Joseph Ratzinger (of the Congregation for the Doctrine of the Faith), who in 2005 became Pope Benedict XVI after the death of Pope John Paul II.

Aided by his psychologist sister Dr. Mary Kathleen (Kate) Ryan Murphy, cousin Mike Casey (known in their family as "Mike the Cop"), and other North Wabash Avenue Irregulars, he counsels people in crises of faith and solves puzzling locked-room murders. In the author's eyes, Blackie represents the priesthood at its best.

== Novels featuring Ryan ==
- Virgin and Martyr (1985)
- Happy Are the Meek (1985)
- Happy Are the Clean of Heart (1986)
- Happy Are Those Who Thirst for Justice (1987)
- Happy Are the Merciful (1992)
- Happy Are the Peace Makers (1993)
- Happy Are the Poor in Spirit (1994)
- Happy Are Those Who Mourn (1995)
- Happy Are the Oppressed (1996)
- White Smoke (1996)
- The Bishop at Sea (1997)
- The Bishop and the Three Kings (1998)
- The Bishop and the Missing L Train (2000)
- The Bishop and the Beggar Girl of St. Germain (2001)
- The Bishop in the West Wing (2002)
- The Bishop Goes to The University (2003)
- The Bishop in the Old Neighborhood (2005).
- The Bishop at the Lake (2007).
- The Archbishop in Andalusia (2008)
