= Springing =

Vibrations in a ship's hull due to impacts from waves

In seamanship, springing refers to global (vertical) vibrations in the girders of the watercraft's hull induced by continuous wave loading. When the vibrations occur as a result of an impulsive wave loading, for example, a wave slam at the bow (bow-slamming) or stern (stern-slamming), the phenomenon is denoted by the term whipping. Springing is a resonance phenomenon, and it can occur when the natural frequency of the 2-node vertical vibration of the ship equals the wave encounter frequency or a multiple therefrom. Whipping is a transient phenomenon of the same hull girder vibrations due to excessive impulsive loading in the bow or stern of the vessel. The 2-node natural frequency is the lowest, and thereby the most dominant resonant mode leading to hull girder stress variations, though in theory higher vibration modes will be excited as well.

Springing-induced vibrations can already be present in low or moderate sea states when resonant conditions occur between wavelengths present in the wave spectrum and the hull girder natural modes, while whipping typically requires rough sea states before the very local occurring slamming impact has sufficient energy to excite the global structural vibration modes.

The hydrodynamic theory of springing is not yet fully understood due to the complex description of the surface waves and structure interaction. It is, however, well known that larger ships with longer resonant periods are more susceptible to this type of vibration. Ships of this type include very large crude carriers and bulk carriers, but possibly also container vessels. The first experience with this phenomenon was related to fatigue cracking on 700 ft Great Lakes bulk carriers during the 1950s. Later, 1000 ft Great Lakes bulk carriers experienced the same problems even after strength specifications increased. The Great Lake bulk carriers are typically rather blunt and slender ships (length-to-width ratio of 10) sailing at shallow draft resulting in long natural periods of about 2 seconds. This mode can be excited by short waves in the wave spectrum. A rather complete overview of the full-scale experiences and relevant literature on springing can be found in references and.

The container ships are slenderer, have higher service speeds and have more pronounced bow flares. Container ships are also known to experience significant whipping (transient) vibrations from bow impacts. Blunt ships may also experience whipping especially with flat bottom impacts in the bow area. The bottom part of the bow however rarely exits from the water on such ships. Vibration from whipping may also increase the extreme loading of ships potentially resulting in vessels breaking in two in severe storms.

In the extreme cases springing may cause severe fatigue cracking of critical structural details, especially in moderate to rough head seas with low peak periods. Vibration is normally more easily excited by waves in ballast condition than in cargo condition. The converse may also be true since some ships experience more head wind and waves in ballast conditions, while other ships may experience more head wind and waves in cargo condition, thereby vibrating less overall.

Ocean-going ships have not had this problem until recently, when high tensile strength steel was introduced as a common material in the whole ship to reduce initial costs. This makes the ships less stiff and the nominal stress level higher.

Today's ship specifications do not account for springing which may be the dominant fatigue factor for some vessels.
