= Catholic imagination =

Catholic viewpoint that God is present in the whole creation

Catholic imagination refers to the Catholic viewpoint that God is present in the whole creation and in human beings, as seen in its sacramental system whereby material things and human beings are channels and sources of God's grace.

== Etymology ==
=== Comparing "Catholic imagination" to "Protestant imagination" ===
Runar Eldebo, a Swedish seminary instructor and correspondent for Pietisten (an online ecumenical newsletter), provided a Lutheran slant on Greeley's distinction between Catholic imagination and Protestant imagination. Invoking Karl Barth, Eldebo wrote:

Protestant imagination is dialectic and makes people pilgrims. It is deep in conflict and antagonistic to the ingredients of a common, human life. Catholic imagination is analogical. It is founded in creation itself and views creation as God in disguise. According to Catholic imagination, God lurks everywhere. According to Protestant imagination, Karl Barth for example, God is hidden everywhere but found only in the revelation of Jesus Christ. Therefore, according to Greeley, Protestants are never at home on earth, they are pilgrims on their way. Catholics, meanwhile, like to dwell on earth. They enjoy life and are not in a hurry to get to heaven because God lurks everywhere, especially where you do not expect her to be.

American Catholic writer Flannery O'Connor illustrated the sacramental understanding of the world in her work "Novelist and Believer":

St. Augustine wrote that the things of the world pour forth from God in a double way: intellectually into the minds of the angels and physically into the world of things. To the person who believes this – as the western world did up until a few centuries ago – this physical, sensible world is good because it proceeds from a divine source ... When [Joseph] Conrad said that his aim as an artist was to render the highest possible justice to the visible universe, he was speaking with the novelist's surest instinct. The artist penetrates the concrete world in order to find at its depths the image of its source, the image of ultimate reality.

=== Aspects and examples of Catholic imagination ===
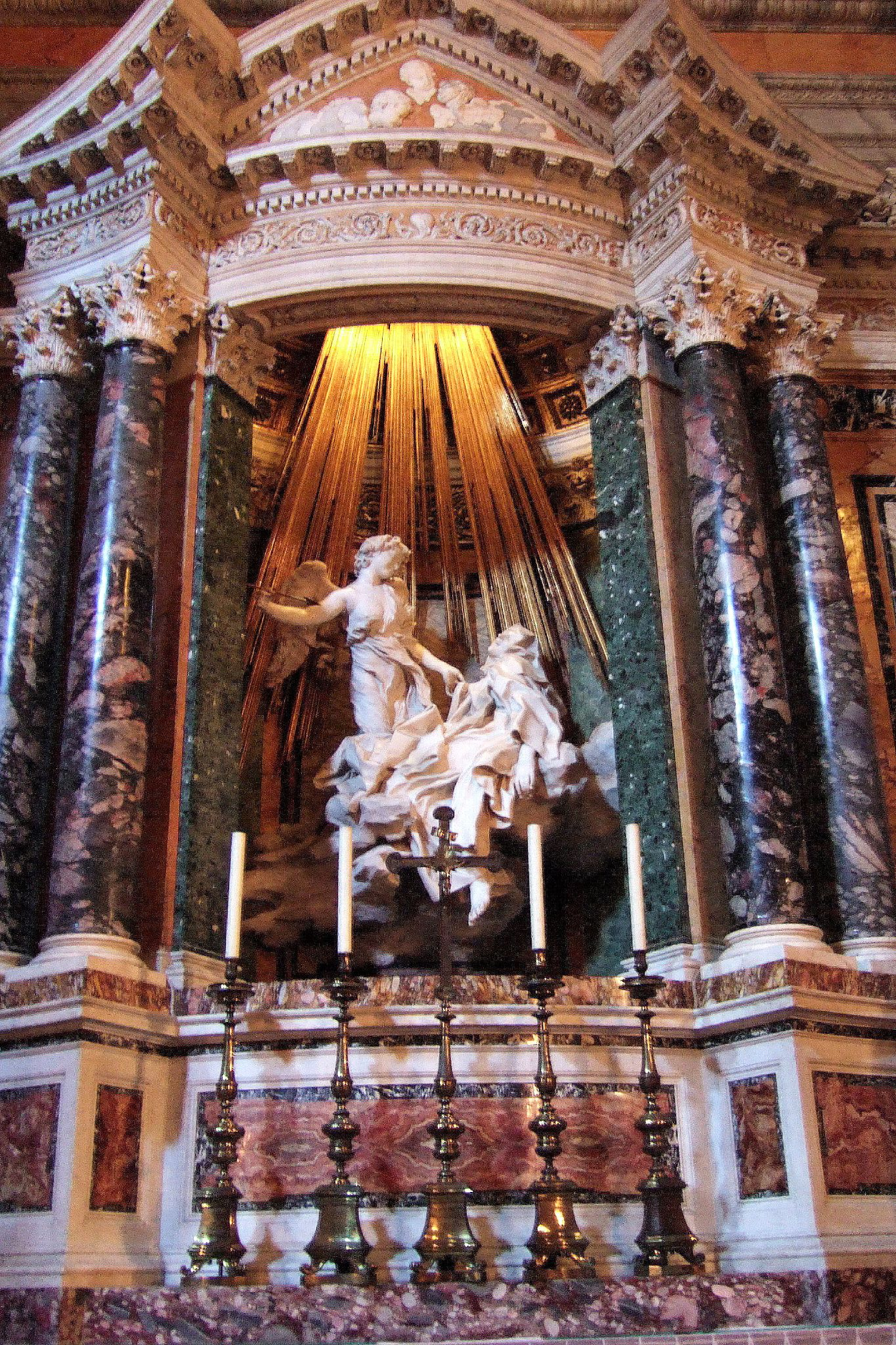
Bernini's Ecstasy of Saint Theresa

According to Greeley aspects of the Catholic imagination include community, salvation, hierarchy, sacred place/sacred time, and sacred desire. As one reviewer of Greeley's book noted:

The cultural works include the Cologne Cathedral, Bernini's St. Theresa in Ecstasy, Marian poems by Gerard Manley Hopkins and François Villon, Italian American films (especially those directed by Martin Scorsese), James Joyce's Ulysses, The Power and the Glory by Graham Greene, the slow movement from Mozart's Piano Concerto no. 26, Verdi's La Traviata, St. Xavier del Bac Mission, and Lars von Trier's motion picture, Breaking the Waves.

=== Analogical and dialectical discourse ===
In The Catholic Imagination (2000), Greeley's aim is to "specify how the Catholic imaginative tradition differs from other versions of the Western Christian story." It informs its research through the work of David Tracy, especially The Analogical Imagination: Christian Theology and the Culture of Pluralism (1981). This work suggests a strategy informed by an analogical imagination as an answer to the theological question of how to "form a new and inevitably complex theological strategy that will avoid privatism" in religious discourse that embraces pluralism. Greeley argues that the metaphor inherent in the Catholic imagination is indicative of the necessity to use metaphor in order to relate knowledge generally:

Cognitive psychologists have recently begun to insist that metaphors – statements that one reality is like another reality – are the fundamental tools of human knowledge. We understand better and explain more adequately one reality to ourselves by comparing it to another reality which we already know.

Tracy sees the tendencies of Catholic artists, writers, and theologians to emphasize a metaphorical discourse – and a way to know the world through analogy – versus a Protestant tendency to stress the disconnect inherent in metaphor, as in a dialectical imagination, which Tracy designates as "a necessary corrective to the analogical imagination."

== Postmodern and contemporary art ==
Greeley states:

The love of God for [Catholics], in perhaps the boldest of all metaphors (and one with which the Church has been perennially uneasy), is like the passionate love between man and woman. God lurks in aroused human love and reveals Himself to us (the two humans first of all) through it.

=== Body as a medium ===
Contemporary art critic and art historian Eleanor Heartney addresses these interpretations of the Catholic imagination in her work Postmodern Heretics: The Catholic Imagination in Contemporary Art, bringing to light the complex relationships underlying Catholicism's sacramental vision and the "physically provocative work it seems to inspire." She discusses how sexualization of the spiritual in contemporary art and the adverse reactions it produces – which through the 1980s to today came to be part of what is known as the "culture war" – is affected in some work by a distinctly Catholic imagination. Heartney draws this connection from the work of those artists who grew up as Catholic or were in some way surrounded by Catholicism in their own lives. Emphasis on the body, its fluids, processes, or sexual behaviors as a site of turning cultural stereotype on its head points to a sacramental influence or underpinning that acknowledges the body and its senses as a way to know the world. She references Greeley and Tracy "to posit the existence of a distinctly Catholic consciousness which is deeply immersed in sensuality and sexuality."

=== America as dialectical ===
Heartney questions why the carnal understanding of the world seems to be so inflammatory in American society, and discusses whether this is "peculiarly American". She reveals that in the contemporary United States, the culture war seems to pit artists with the Catholic analogical underpinning "against spokespeople for a 'Christian' (read evangelical) America for whom flesh is a condition to be transcended rather than celebrated."

=== Complexity of the incarnational imagination ===
Leo Steinberg's controversial The Sexuality of Christ in Renaissance Art and in Modern Oblivion points out that, "Renaissance Art ... became the first Christian art in a thousand years to confront the Incarnation entire, the upper and the lower body together, not excluding even the body's sexual component." He goes on to reference several works in which Christ's genitals are the focal point of the image, intentionally, so as to counter a heresy denying Christ's humanity. He indicates that the sexuality of Christ – of God – is indeed within the canon of Catholicism itself. This controversy continues into the contemporary Catholic religion as well, revealing still a deep-seated uneasiness over how fleshly an imagination is too fleshly an imagination. Greeley makes this point:

The propensity to protect God from profanation, at the heart of the dialectical imagination, is very strong even among Catholics because official Catholicism has yet to make up its mind whether it really believes that sexual passion is not in itself lewd or lustful.

Postmodern artists and artists today, influenced by the Catholic imagination, who are using aspects of the body to pose their questions to society, are frequently working out of the inherently complex contradictions of sacramental vision.

=== List of examples ===
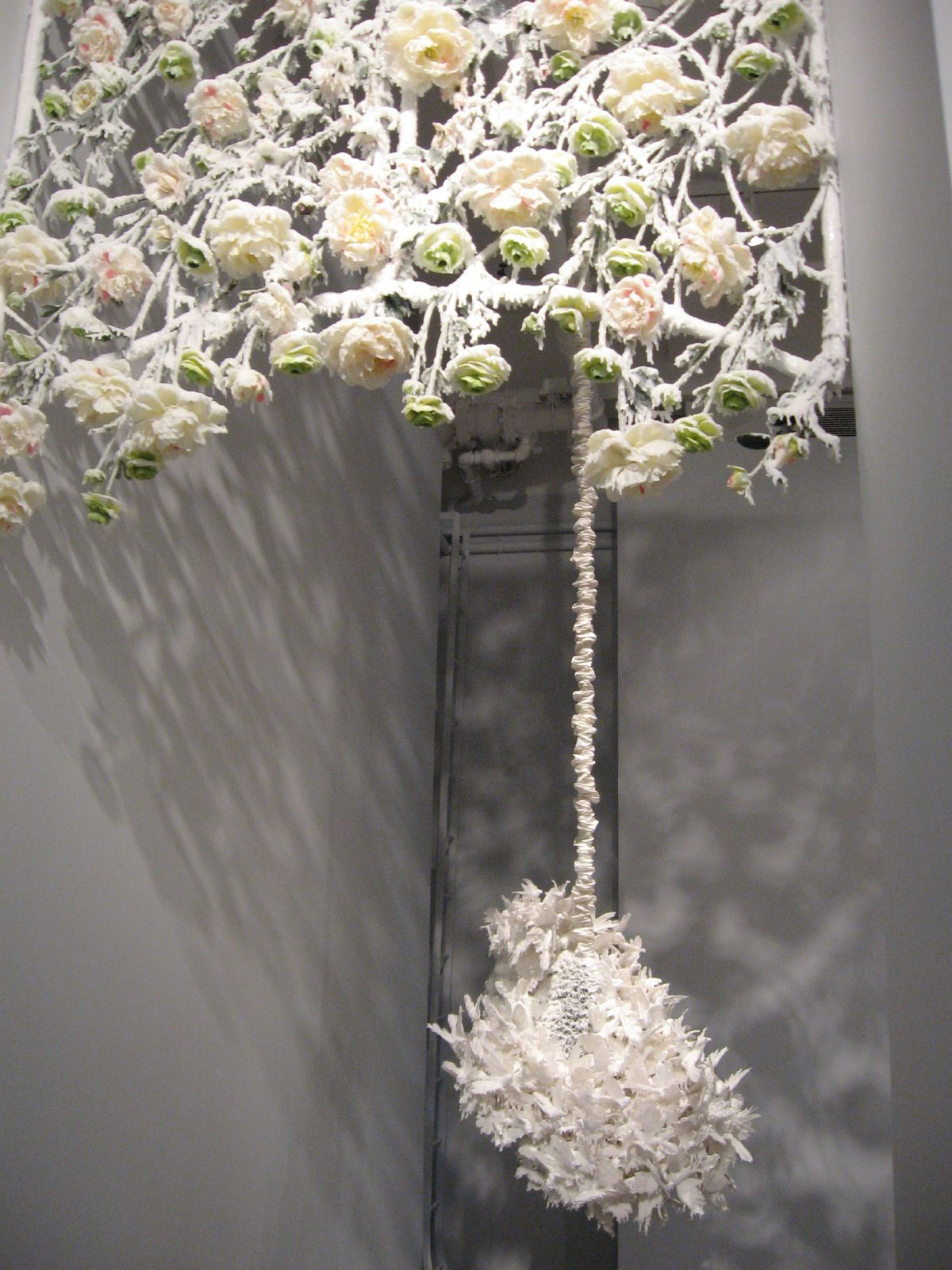
Petah Coyne's mixed media sculpture "Unforgiven"

Brief examples of artists and works of art with reference to a Catholic imagination:

- Carolee Schneeman: performance "Meat Joy" (1964)
- Dennis Oppenheim: performance "Reading Position for Second Degree Burn" (1970)
- Vito Acconci: performance "Trademarks" (1970)
- Chris Burdern: performance "Trans-fixed" (1974)
- Marina Abromovic: performance "Rhythm 0" (1974)
- Linda Montano: performance "One Year Performance" (1983)
- Robert Mapplethorpe: photograph "Dennis Spaight with Calla Lilies" (1983)
- Karen Finley: performance "We Keep Our Victims Ready" (1990)
- Andres Serrano: cibachrome print "The Morgue (Fatal Meningitis II)" (1992)
- Ron Athey: performance "Four Scenes in a Harsh Life" (1994)
- Sheree Rose and Bob Flanagan: performance "Visiting Hours" (1994)
- Renee Cox: photograph "Yo Mama's Last Supper" (1996)
- Jeanine Antoni: cibachrome print "Coddle" (1999)
- Petah Coyne: mixed media sculpture "Untitled #1093 (s) 02-03 (Buddha Boy)" (2002-2003)

See also: Lisa Yuskavage, Kiki Smith, Andy Warhol, Tim Miller, David Wojnarowicz

== See also ==
- Panentheism
- Sacraments of the Catholic Church
- Theology of the Body
