= List of The Rifleman episodes =

The Rifleman is an American Western television series that starred Chuck Connors as homesteader Lucas McCain and Johnny Crawford as his son, Mark McCain. The series was set in the 1880s in the town of North Fork, New Mexico Territory, and was filmed in black and white with a half-hour running time. The Rifleman aired on ABC from September 30, 1958, to April 8, 1963, as a production of Four Star Television. The series has 168 episodes.

== Series overview ==
Season	Episodes	Originally released	
Season	Episodes	First released	Last released
1	40	September 30, 1958	June 30, 1959
2	36	September 29, 1959	May 31, 1960
3	34	September 27, 1960	May 16, 1961
4	32	October 2, 1961	May 7, 1962
5	26	October 1, 1962	April 8, 1963

== Episodes ==
=== Season 1 (1958–59) ===
No. overall	No. in season	Title	Directed by	Written by	Original release date
1	1	"The Sharpshooter"	Arnold Laven	Sam Peckinpah	September 30, 1958
Lucas (Chuck Connors) and Mark McCain (Johnny Crawford) finally find the ranch for which they have been looking, but the ranch comes with a price, and Lucas may have to decide between the ranch and his son's life. Guest stars: Dennis Hopper, Leif Erickson, Sidney Blackmer, R. G. Armstrong as Marshal Fred Tomlinson, Charles Arnt, Mickey Simpson, Kathleen Mulqueen, Jesse Wayne (uncredited), Paul Fix (uncredited); Note: This episode was originally an episode from Dick Powell's Zane Grey Theatre and became the pilot for The Rifleman, which began September 30, 1958. Paul Fix was cast in this episode (uncredited) as a doctor, but returned to join the cast as Micah Torrance and remained a major cast member for the show's run.
2	2	"Home Ranch"	Arnold Laven	Sam Peckinpah	October 7, 1958
After two of Oat Jackford's cowhands burn the McCain house, drag Lucas, and steal his rifle, Lucas goes to hunt Jackford (Harold J. Stone) and his men to inform them that his boy and he are there to stay. Guest stars: Lee Farr, Rodolfo Hoyos Jr., Don Kennedy
3	3	"End of a Young Gun"	Jerry Hopper	Frank D. Gilroy	October 14, 1958
When Mark gets caught on a mountain ledge, a young outlaw (Michael Landon) risks his life to rescue him and breaks his leg doing so. Guest stars: Charles Cooper, Carolyn Craig
4	4	"The Marshal"	Sam Peckinpah	Sam Peckinpah	October 21, 1958
The notorious Shelton brothers (Robert J. Wilke, Warren Oates) ride into North Fork to take revenge on Micah Torrance (Paul Fix), an ex-lawman who is now crippled with alcoholism. When Marshal Fred Tomlinson (R. G. Armstrong) is killed by the Sheltons, Micah is called upon to take his place. Guest stars: James Drury, Abby Dalton, Bill Quinn, Bert Stevens (uncredited)
5	5	"The Brother-in-Law"	Arnold Laven	David Victor & Herbert Little, Jr.	October 28, 1958
Johnny Gibbs (Jerome Courtland), Lucas McCain's fugitive brother-in-law, visits the McCain ranch. Guest stars: Fay Roope, Karl Lukas, Dan White (uncredited)
6	6	"Eight Hours to Die"	Arnold Laven	Palmer Thompson	November 4, 1958
A bitter judge (George Macready) kidnaps Mark and plans to kill him to avenge his own son's hanging while Lucas watches. Lucas is petrified. Guest stars: Russell Collins, Hope Summers, Marilee Phelps, Robert L. Crawford, Jr., Bud Osborne
7	7	"Duel of Honor"	Joseph H. Lewis	Ken Kolb	November 11, 1958
A stagecoach breaks down and Italian nobleman Count Di Montova (Cesare Danova) is stranded overnight in North Fork. He accepts a challenge for a gun duel after being insulted by Sim Groder (Jack Elam). Guest stars: John Dierkes, Bill Quinn, Glenn Strange, John Harmon
8	8	"The Safe Guard"	Joseph H. Lewis	David Swift	November 18, 1958
The first bank in North Fork is opening, and a Texas gunfighter (Claude Akins) is hired to guard the safe, but a gang of bank robbers that used to include him arrives in town. Guest stars: Marc Lawrence, Harlan Warde, Hope Summers, Dennis Cross, Sidney Blackmer
9	9	"The Sister"	Montgomery Pittman	Montgomery Pittman	November 25, 1958
Mark tries to set Lucas up with a woman (Sherry Jackson) he thinks would make a perfect wife. Lucas soon finds himself contending with the woman's two brothers, as well as some outlaws intent on killing him. Guest stars: Mort Mills, Dan Blocker, Lance Fuller, Hope Summers, John Dierkes
10	10	"New Orleans Menace"	Arnold Laven	Cyril Hume	December 2, 1958
A New Orleans gambling czar (Akim Tamiroff) and his men stop at the McCain ranch and decide to take it from Lucas. Guest stars: Michael Pate, Hope Summers, Harlan Warde
11	11	"The Apprentice Sheriff"	Arthur Hiller	Barney Slater	December 9, 1958
Lucas tries to help a young West Point reject (Robert Vaughn), who is filling in as marshal, just as the town erupts into a gunfight. Guest stars: Edward Binns, Russell Collins, William Bryant, Grant Richards
12	12	"The Angry Gun"	David Swift	Samuel A. Peeples	December 16, 1958
Lucas and Mark return from a cattle sale when their stagecoach is robbed by three outlaws led by sharpshooter Johnny Cotton (Vic Morrow). Lucas sends Mark on with the stagecoach, while he goes after the outlaws on foot without his rifle. Guest stars: Gregory Walcott, Leo Gordon, Harry Hickox
13	13	"The Young Englishman"	Arnold Laven	Arthur Weiss	December 23, 1958
Lucas accuses the young foreman of a neighboring ranch of rustling one of his calves. Guest stars: Allen Case, James Coburn, Ted de Corsia
14	14	"The Gaucho"	Jerry Hopper	Bruce Geller	December 30, 1958
Lucas helps a family of Argentinians who are new to North Fork when they are ridiculed by others. Guest stars: Perry Lopez, Lawrence Dobkin, Chana Eden, Dennis Cross, Harlan Warde, Stuart Randall, Robert L. Crawford, Jr., Montie Montana
15	15	"The Pet"	Joseph H. Lewis	Ken Kolb	January 6, 1959
Lucas allows Mark to take in a homeless horse after its owner is killed in a gunfight. Lucas soon discovers the truth about the horse and has to fight a gunman who does not want a secret to be exposed. Guest stars: Robert J. Wilke, Bill Erwin, Edgar Buchanan
16	16	"The Sheridan Story"	Arnold Laven	Cyril Hume	January 13, 1959
Wanting to teach Mark about tolerance and acceptance, Lucas hires an injured and bitter Confederate soldier (Royal Dano) to work on his ranch, only the Union army also arrives at the farm. Guest stars: Lawrence Dobkin, Frank Wilcox, Stephen Chase
17	17	"The Retired Gun"	Arnold Laven	Barney Slater	January 20, 1959
A famous gunman (Robert Webber) promises his new bride that he will retire from gunfighting and settle in North Fork, but five outlaws try to make him break his promise. Guest stars: Jack Kruschen, John Anderson, Duke Snider, Joseph Mell
18	18	"The Photographer"	Arnold Laven	Ken Kolb	January 27, 1959
When Abel Goss (John Carradine), a photographer friend of the McCains', is accused of murder, father and son take opposing views on the matter. Guest stars: Sidney Blackmer, Robert Ellenstein, Raymond Bailey
19	19	"Shivaree"	Joseph H. Lewis	David Victor & Herbert Little	February 3, 1959
A young couple (Paul Carr, Luana Anders) is forced to marry after they hide the fact that one of them is a girl, and Lucas helps them hide, but a rowdy crowd calls for a Shivaree. Guest stars: Morris Ankrum, John Anderson, Olive Carey, William Bryant, Edgar Dearing
20	20	"The Deadeye Kid"	Jerry Hopper	Palmer Thompson	February 10, 1959
Lucas and Mark protect a witness (Kip King) wrongfully accused of murder. Guest stars: Douglas Spencer, Glenn Strange
21	21	"The Indian"	Arnold Laven	Cyril Hume	February 17, 1959
U.S. Marshal Sam Buckhart (Michael Ansara) arrives in North Fork to look for Indians who are suspected in the brutal murder of a Ranger and his family. Guest stars: Herbert Rudley, Mickey Simpson, Frank DeKova, Eddie Little Sky, Bill Quinn Note: This is the pilot for the series Law of the Plainsman
22	22	"The Boarding House"	Sam Peckinpah	Sam Peckinpah	February 24, 1959
Julia Massini (Katy Jurado), a reformed gambler, runs a respectable boarding house in North Fork, but her old boss (Alan Baxter) shows up and tries to force her to turn her place into a gambling house. Guest stars: Harlan Warde, Sarah Selby, Peggy Maley, Kay Cousins, Charles Fredericks, Bill Quinn
23	23	"The Second Witness"	Lewis Allen	Judy & George W. George	March 3, 1959
After the witness in a murder case is killed, Lucas agrees to testify to convict a murderer, but someone wants the prosecution stopped. Mark and the townsfolk try to talk Lucas out of testifying. Guest stars: Michael Pate, Hope Summers, Robert Foulk, Robert L. Crawford, Jr., Edgar Buchanan
24	24	"The Trade"	Joseph H. Lewis	David Lang	March 10, 1959
After falling in love with a sick young woman, fugitive Sam Morley (Paul Richards) asks his friend Lucas to turn him in and use the reward money to pay for the woman's medical needs. Guest stars: Chris Alcaide, Dan Sheridan, Michael Fox, John Harmon, Edgar Buchanan, Katharine Bard
25	25	"One Went to Denver"	Lewis Allen	Pat Fielder	March 17, 1959
Lucas' friend and renowned bank robber Tom Birch (Richard Anderson) comes for a surprise visit, upsetting Mark. Neither Mark nor Lucas knows the man has plans to rob the North Fork bank. Guest stars: Jack Kruschen, Harlan Warde, Bill Quinn
26	26	"The Deadly Wait"	Joseph H. Lewis	Arthur Browne, Jr.	March 24, 1959
Released from Yuma prison, Dan Maury (Lee Van Cleef) arrives in North Fork intent on getting even with Marshal Torrance, who helped send him to jail. Guest stars: Edgar Buchanan, Bill Quinn
27	27	"The Wrong Man"	Arnold Laven	N. B. Stone, Jr.	March 31, 1959
A crooked marshal from another territory intentionally kills an innocent man to collect the bounty money. Guest stars: Robert H. Harris, Gordon Jones, Frank Sully, Lyle Bettger
28	28	"The Challenge"	Lewis Allen	David Victor & Herbert Little	April 7, 1959
An escaped killer holds Hattie and Micah hostage at the general store to prove that he is still good with a gun. Guest stars: Les Tremayne, John Durren, Hope Summers, Harlan Warde, John Maxwell, Bill Quinn, Adam Williams
29	29	"The Hawk"	Lamont Johnson	Arthur Browne, Jr.	April 14, 1959
The McCains befriend a stranger (Patrick McVey) after he saves Mark from a rattlesnake, but they soon discover that he is not who he says he is. Guest star: John Anderson
30	30	"Three-Legged Terror"	William Conrad	Palmer Thompson	April 21, 1959
Lucas takes in an orphaned teen (Dennis Hopper) being raised by his abusive uncle after trouble is caused at the school. Guest stars: John Hoyt, Robert Foulk, Bill Quinn, Patricia Barry
31	31	"The Angry Man"	Jerry Hopper	Arthur Browne, Jr.	April 28, 1959
A neighboring rancher (George Mathews) refuses medical assistance when his son is seriously hurt in an accident because he blames doctors for the death of his wife. Guest star: Edgar Buchanan
32	32	"The Woman"	Arnold Laven	Pat Fielder & Bernard Girard	May 5, 1959
After a boy (Paul Carr) admits to his father that the school teacher (Patricia Barry) and he are in love, his rancher father (James Westerfield) chases the teacher, an advocator for women's rights, out of town. Lucas wants to learn the truth. Guest stars: Mel Carter, Hope Summers, Bill Quinn, Glenn Strange
33	33	"The Money Gun"	Sam Peckinpah	Bruce Geller	May 12, 1959
Bookkeeper Asa Manning (William Phipps) hires a professional gunman (John Dehner) to provoke Oat Jackford (Bert Freed), a bully rancher who suspects him of embezzlement, into a gunfight. Lucas is forced to assist Jackford, the man he once hated. Guest stars: Harlan Warde, Earle Hodgins, Frank Hagney
34	34	"A Matter of Faith"	Don Taylor	Harry Kronman	May 19, 1959
A drought has forced local cowhands to seek work on a railroad construction project, and railroad executives are afraid that their workers will desert them when an old man (Royal Dano) claims to have found a way to make rain. Guest stars: Parley Baer, Bing Russell
35	35	"Blood Brothers"	Arnold Laven	Story by : Chuck Connors; Teleplay by : Pat Fielder	May 26, 1959
Lucas is surprised when Micah wishes death on a dying man (Max Wagner) he brings into North Fork, then Lucas discovers that Micah holds a big secret. Guest stars: Richard Devon, Kelton Garwood, Rhys Williams
36	36	"Stranger at Night"	Lewis Allen	David Lang	June 2, 1959
Mark stumbles across a dead man and the only clue to his identity is a belt with the initials RM. Guest stars: Jack Hogan, Bill Quinn, Thomas Gomez
37	37	"The Raid"	Paul Landres	Harry Julian Fink	June 9, 1959
A renegade band of Indians captures Mark and disappears into the hills of New Mexico. Guest stars: Michael Forest, Pat Hogan, Hope Summers, Robert Foulk, Clancy Cooper, Mark Goddard, Michael Ansara Note: This is the sequel to the episode "The Indian".
38	38	"Outlaw's Inheritance"	Don Taylor	Judy & George W. George	June 16, 1959
The townspeople question the reputation of Lucas when he is named in a will of a notorious outlaw. Guest stars: Dabbs Greer, Harlan Warde, Robert Foulk, William Bishop
39	39	"Boomerang"	Joseph H. Lewis	Arthur Browne, Jr.	June 23, 1959
Lucas takes in an orphaned boy (Lee Kinsolving) and teaches him how to use a gun, not knowing that the boy plans on killing the banker (rlan Warde]]) he believes is responsible for his father's death. Guest stars: Dabbs Greer, Hope Summers
40	40	"The Mind Reader"	Don Medford	Robert C. Dennis	June 30, 1959
Accused of a murder he did not commit, a young man (Michael Landon) is finally cleared by the accidental discovery of a "mind reader" (John Carradine). Guest stars: Sue Randall, Vic Perrin, Robert Bice, William Schallert, John Harmon, Charles Seel

=== Season 2 (1959–60) ===
No. overall	No. in season	Title	Directed by	Written by	Original release date
41	1	"The Patsy"	Joseph H. Lewis	Harry Kronman	September 29, 1959
Three gunfighters (John Anderson, Steven Marlo, Dennis Cross) use a cowardly barber (Whit Bissell) and his son to talk Lucas into a gunfight so they can kill Lucas and take over the town. Guest stars: John Anderson, Don Grady, Dennis Cross
42	2	"Bloodlines"	Arthur Hiller	Arthur Browne, Jr.	October 6, 1959
After Lucas is blamed for killing a young man, an outlaw father and his two sons attempt to kill Lucas. Guest stars: Denver Pyle, Warren Oates, Christopher Dark, Buddy Hackett, Rhys Williams, Bill Quinn, Archie Butler
43	3	"The Blowout"	James Neilson	Arthur Browne, Jr.	October 13, 1959
An ailing gunfighter (John Dehner) comes to North Fork to die under a doctor's care in order to spare his family. But the gunfighter is being pursued by bank robbers (John Milford, Howard Ledig) from whom he stole robbery money. Guest stars: Hugh Sanders, Bill Quinn, Glenn Strange, George Brenlin, James Parnell
44	4	"Obituary"	Don Medford	Teddi Sherman & Ward Wood	October 20, 1959
After Lucas accuses a newspaper writer's (Alexander Scourby) misleading articles of causing an innocent man's death, the writer begins writing articles about Lucas. Guest stars: Joanna Moore, Chris Alcaide
45	5	"Tension"	Ted Post	David Lang	October 27, 1959
After a wanna-be bounty hunter (Harry Dean Stanton) kills a man (Gregory Walcott) wanted for a crime committed long ago, Lucas and Mark try to protect the widow (Sydna Scott) from learning about her husband's criminal past. Guest stars: Robert H. Harris, Jack Elam
46	6	"Eddie's Daughter"	Joseph H. Lewis	William F. Leicester	November 3, 1959
Eddie's daughter (Gloria DeHaven), who is withholding criminal information and stolen money, comes to meet her father (John Harmon) and causes trouble for Lucas. Guest stars: Bill Quinn, Peter Whitney, Ray Teal
47	7	"Panic"	Joseph H. Lewis	Albert Aley	November 10, 1959
Lucas discovers a young married couple (William Joyce and Enid Janes) with yellow fever and cares for them at his house, but Mark lets out the secret which causes panic in town. Guest stars: Dabbs Greer, Fay Roope, Bill Quinn, Hope Summers
48	8	"Ordeal"	Paul Landres	Palmer Thompson	November 17, 1959
A series of events leads to Lucas and Mark being stranded in the middle of a desert with very little food or water, and after Lucas is injured, Mark becomes the only hope for their survival.
49	9	"The Spiked Rifle"	John English	Palmer Thompson	November 24, 1959
An unarmed outlaw (Richard Devon) robs the stage of a lot of money after the outlaw informs Lucas that his son, Mark, is being held hostage at the McCain ranch and will be killed within the hour unless Lucas cooperates. Guest stars: Harlan Warde, Jack Lambert, Baynes Barron, Virginia Christine, Glenn Strange, Charles E. Conrad, Fay Roope, John Harmon
50	10	"Letter of the Law"	Joseph H. Lewis	Judy & George W. George	December 1, 1959
Lucas makes a life-and-death decision when Micah is held hostage and the kidnappers demand the release of a notorious outlaw (Vic Morrow). Guest stars: Rhys Williams, Ken Lynch, Michael Fox, Paul Carr
51	11	"Legacy"	Bernard L. Kowalski	Edmund Morris	December 8, 1959
Lucas respects a dying man's (James Barton) wishes by telling the son (James Franciscus) that his father is a partner in the McCain ranch in order to get him to North Fork, but Lucas finds trouble when the man dies before telling his son the truth. Guest stars: Jack Grinnage, Denver Pyle, Fay Roope, Bill Quinn, Robert Bice, Donald Elson, Lillian Bronson, Harry Harvey, Don Kennedy
52	12	"The Baby Sitter"	Sam Peckinpah	Sam Peckinpah & Jack Curtis	December 15, 1959
A singer (Phyllis Avery) asks Lucas to care for her daughter in an effort to hide the child from its bigoted father (John Dehner). Guest stars: Lillian Bronson, Henry Rowland, Bill Quinn
53	13	"The Coward"	James Neilson	Philip Saltzman & Clair Huffaker	December 22, 1959
Lucas becomes involved in a battle between a recently fired cook (Carleton Carpenter) and a cocky trail hand (Steve Rowland) who finds it fun to attack those weaker than himself. Guest stars: John Milford, Robert Bice, Bill Quinn
54	14	"Surveyors"	Joseph H. Lewis	Dale & Katherine Albert Eunson	December 29, 1959
A surveying party camps near North Fork. Mark carries a milk supply to their campsite. No one is there, and Mark falls asleep in a tent while reading a surveying book. Meanwhile, two of the surveyors (Mike Kellin, Lin McCarthy) have murdered a third (Ted Otis), and are planning a crime in North Fork. Mark awakens when they return. He hears just a little of their talk; just enough for him to think that something bad is going to happen. He tells Lucas, but Lucas is not convinced. Mark must persist, and Lucas must consider and reconsider, before deciding what to do.
55	15	"Day of the Hunter"	Joseph H. Lewis	John Dunkel	January 5, 1960
Lucas refuses a shooting competition with wandering buffalo hunter Cass Callicott (John Anderson) and then becomes his new target. Guest star: Dick Elliott
56	16	"Mail Order Groom"	Arthur Hiller	Gene Olson	January 12, 1960
Shortly after his arrival to marry Isabelle (Alice Backes), John Jupiter (Peter Whitney) is taunted and beaten. Guest stars: Sandy Kenyon, Montie Montana
57	17	"A Case of Identity"	John Peyser	Philip Saltzman	January 19, 1960
A man (Royal Dano) hires two private detectives to find his long-lost son. They presume him to be dead and try to take Mark to pass him off as the son in order to collect the money. Guest stars: Herbert Rudley, Chris Alcaide, Rhys Williams
58	18	"The Visitor"	Joseph H. Lewis	William F. Leicester, Chuck Connors, and Wally Bennett	January 26, 1960
Anne Dodd (Christine White), a pretty young widow of a man who was once Lucas' good friend, visits. Guest stars: Michael Pate, June Vincent, John Harmon
59	19	"Hero"	Joseph H. Lewis	Albert Aley	February 2, 1960
The body of a notorious outlaw, the Domino Kid, is brought in by Colly Vane (Robert Culp), who doesn't get the reward for he shot the man in the back. Guest stars: Frank Ferguson, Lynn Cartier, Dennis Cross
60	20	"The Horse Traders"	William Claxton	Jack Curtis	February 9, 1960
Lucas and Mark try to help out a friend (Chubby Johnson) who has been cheated in a horse trading deal. Guest stars: Jack Kirkwood, John Milford, Clegg Hoyt
61	21	"The Spoiler"	Joseph H. Lewis	Harry Kronman	February 16, 1960
The Averys (Chubby Johnson, Ellen Corby), Lucas' new elderly neighbors, live under an assumed name to keep the town from knowing they are the parents of a vicious wanted killer (Skip Homeier). Guest stars: Malcolm Cassell, Ralph Moody, and Max Wagner
62	22	"Heller"	Joseph H. Lewis	Christopher Knopf	February 23, 1960
Teenaged Heller (Gigi Perreau) and her brother (Don Grady) are badly mistreated by their drunken stepfather (Peter Whitney). Guest stars: K.T. Stevens, Hope Summers
63	23	"The Grasshopper"	Lewis Allen	Pat Fielder	March 1, 1960
Lucas and Mark find themselves held at gunpoint by a prisoner (Richard Devon) being transported on a train, which becomes stranded from a plague of grasshoppers. Guest stars: Arthur Hunnicutt, Arthur Space, Ethan Laidlaw, Hope Summers
64	24	"A Time for Singing"	John Rich	Harry Kronman	March 8, 1960
Mark learns a new preacher (Robert Knapp) is an impostor. Guest stars: Chris Alcaide, Patricia Barry, John Milford, Hope Summers
65	25	"The Deserter"	Joseph H. Lewis	Albert Aley	March 15, 1960
Lucas learns why a young soldier (Ron Hagerthy) deserted. Guest stars: Robert O. Cornthwaite, Harry Carey, Jr., Bill Quinn, Richard Alexander
66	26	"The Vision"	Don Medford	Cyril Hume	March 22, 1960
While ill with typhoid fever, Mark has a vision of his mother (Marian Seldes). Guest stars: Karl Swenson, Hope Summers, Natividad Vacío, Dennis Cross, John Abbott, Chuck Hicks
67	27	"Lariat"	Don Medford	Pat Fielder	March 29, 1960
An old friend (Richard Anderson) of Lucas' arrives in North Fork to open a gambling casino. Guest stars: Steve Conte, Dayton Lummis, George Macready, James Flavin, Bill Quinn, Snub Pollard
68	28	"Smoke Screen"	Murray Golden	Palmer Thompson	April 5, 1960
The daughter (Jennifer Lea) of a prosperous rancher (Douglas Kennedy) is found murdered. Guest stars: Paul Carr, George N. Neise, William Benedict
69	29	"Shotgun Man"	Joseph H. Lewis	Jack Curtis & Paul Mazursky	April 12, 1960
Lucas receives a series of mysterious threatening notes from an ex-convict (John Anderson) with a grudge. Guest stars: John Harmon, Bill Quinn, Jack Elam
70	30	"Sins of the Father"	Ted Post	Philip Saltzman & Lewis Meltzer	April 19, 1960
Andy Moon (George D. Wallace) and his young son (Eugene Mazzola) take shelter at the McCain ranch. Guest stars: Richard Evans, Kay E. Kuter, Kelton Garwood, Dick Wilson, Rhys Williams, Charles Tannen
71	31	"The Prodigal"	Donald McDougall	Robert Sherman	April 26, 1960
A bank-robbing gunman (Kevin Hagen) decides to hide out at the McCain ranch. Guest stars: Josephine Hutchinson, Warren Oates, Lee Van Cleef, Hope Summers
72	32	"The Fourflusher"	Joseph H. Lewis	Thomas Thompson	May 3, 1960
A neighbor (Whit Bissell) has bet his whole year's farm crop on a horse race. Guest stars: James Westerfield, K.T. Stevens, Hope Summers
73	33	"The Jailbird"	Don Taylor	Frederic Conrad	May 10, 1960
A convict (Dabbs Greer) is released from prison and returns home to North Fork. Guest stars: Karl Swenson, Bill Quinn, Molly Dodd
74	34	"Meeting at Midnight"	Don Medford	Pat Fielder & Arthur Browne Jr.	May 17, 1960
Lucas helps an old friend (Claude Akins), a federal agent, infiltrate a gang of robbers. Guest stars: Chris Alcaide, John Milford, Frank DeKova, Bill Quinn
75	35	"Nora"	Ted Post	David Victor & Herbert Little	May 24, 1960
Lucas helps a woman (Julie Adams) who is being harassed by a rough gambler. Guest stars: Michael Fox, Johnny Carpenter
76	36	"The Hangman"	Joseph H. Lewis	Teddi Sherman & Ward Wood	May 31, 1960
An ex-convict (Whit Bissell) is accused of robbing and killing his employer. Guest stars: Denver Pyle, Richard Deacon, Betty Lou Gerson

=== Season 3 (1960–61) ===
No. overall	No. in season	Title	Directed by	Written by	Original release date
77	1	"Trail of Hate"	Arnold Laven	Calvin Clements	September 27, 1960
Three robbers hold Mark hostage, forcing Lucas to help them rob the North Fork bank. Guest stars: Marc Lawrence, Harold J. Stone, Jack Kruschen, Harlan Warde
78	2	"Woman from Hog Ridge"	William F. Claxton	Calvin Clements	October 4, 1960
A matriarch seeks revenge for her sons' deaths. Guest stars: Lane Bradford, James Hurst, Robert F. Hoy
79	3	"Seven"	Ted Post	Arthur Browne, Jr.	October 11, 1960
A prison wagon carrying seven criminals stops over in North Fork for supplies. Guest stars: Bing Russell, Helen Beverley, Hope Summers, Don Megowan
80	4	"The Pitchman"	John Rich	Jay Simms	October 18, 1960
A con man and his son want Lucas' mineral rights. Guest stars: John Milford, Paul Wexler, and Bob Sweeney
81	5	"Strange Town"	Joseph H. Lewis	Jack Curtis	October 25, 1960
Lucas trails an escaped prisoner (Claude Akins) to a mining town in the mountains. Guest stars: William Schallert, Claude Akins, Peter Whitney
82	6	"Baranca"	Joseph H. Lewis	Mike Mamakos & Peter Mamakos	November 1, 1960
A Mexican bandit and his gang ride into North Fork. Guest stars: John Milford, Jack Kruschen, Linda Dangcil, Cesare Danova
83	7	"The Martinet"	Joseph H. Lewis	Phillip Saltzman	November 8, 1960
Lucas helps a young minister who had problems with his father. Guest stars: John Hoyt, Don Dubbins, Richard Alexander
84	8	"Miss Milly"	Joseph H. Lewis	Arthur Browne, Jr.	November 15, 1960
A new store owner unknowingly hires con men as collection agents. Guest stars: Joan Taylor, Warren Oates, Michael Fox, Charles Tannen, Richard Devon
85	9	"Dead Cold Cash"	Dick Moder	Irving Elman & Arthur Browne, Jr.	November 22, 1960
Before she dies, the widow of a bandit Lucas shot arranges for his death. Guest stars: Joan Taylor, Steve Darrell, Chris Alcaide, Harlan Warde, and Ed Nelson
86	10	"The Schoolmaster"	Arthur Hiller	Margaret Armen	November 29, 1960
Mark is trapped in an old mine. Guest stars: Jimmy Fields, Pamela Cole, and Arnold Moss
87	11	"The Promoter"	Dick Moder	Phillip Saltzman	December 6, 1960
A con man makes his living by provoking and then betting on gunfights. Guest stars: Dabbs Greer, Denny Miller
88	12	"The Illustrator"	Don Medford	Ken Kolb & Robert Mark	December 13, 1960
A hard-drinking painter is accused of murder. Guest stars: Midge Ware, Dayton Lummis, Ed Nelson, Joseph V. Perry, Richard Whorf
89	13	"The Silent Knife"	Don Medford	John Wilder & Douglas Stevens	December 20, 1960
A desperate, mute man steals from the stagecoach. Guest star: Richard Devon
90	14	"Miss Bertie"	James Clavell	Margaret Armen	December 27, 1960
A sprightly elderly lady arrives in North Fork and announces that she plans to capture a bandit. Guest stars: Joan Taylor, Agnes Moorehead, Richard Anderson
91	15	"Six Years And A Day"	Paul Wendkos	Peter Arends	January 3, 1961
Lucas helps alcoholic former doctor Jack Cooke (John Larch) regain his self-respect. Guest stars: John Larch, James Gavin, Ron Hayes, Ralph Moody
92	16	"Flowers By The Door"	Joseph H. Lewis	Harry Kronman	January 10, 1961
Lucas unmasks a book salesman as a killer. Guest stars: Richard Anderson, Jean Allison, Patricia Breslin
93	17	"Long Trek"	Lamont Johnson	Calvin Clements	January 17, 1961
Lucas and Micah are beset with troubles while bringing a killer to trial. Guest star: Lonny Chapman
94	18	"The Actress"	Joseph H. Lewis	Chuck Connors & Lawrence Dobkin	January 24, 1961
A dying friend asks Lucas to fetch his wife. Guest stars: Morris Ankrum, Diana Millay, Ralph Moody, Charles Tannen
95	19	"Face Of Yesterday"	Joseph H. Lewis	Palmer Thompson	January 31, 1961
Lucas begins to believe in ghosts when he sees someone he thinks he killed in the war. Guest stars: Joan Taylor, K.T. Stevens, Ralph Moody, Ben Cooper, John Anderson
96	20	"The Wyoming Story"	Joseph H. Lewis	Arthur Browne, Jr.	February 7, 1961
97	21	"The Wyoming Story"	Joseph H. Lewis	Arthur Browne, Jr.	February 14, 1961
Lucas goes undercover as a federal agent and is sent to Wyoming to investigate the sale of guns to Indians. Guest stars: Joan Taylor, Kent Taylor, Dabbs Greer, Russell Thorson, Chris Alcaide
98	22	"Closer Than A Brother"	Joseph H. Lewis	Cyril Hume	February 21, 1961
Micah is terrorized by an old enemy and resigns from his job. Guest stars: Rex Ingram, Berry Kroeger, Bill Quinn
99	23	"The Lost Treasure Of Canyon Town"	Don Taylor	Calvin Clements	February 28, 1961
Lucas, Mark and Micah learn the secret of a town's 20-year-old mystery of a lost gold mine. Guest star: Willam Fawcett
100	24	"Dark Day At North Fork"	Paul Landres	Arthur Browne, Jr.	March 7, 1961
Lucas, temporarily blind, faces a gunfight. Guest stars: Joan Taylor, John Milford, Ralph Moody, Joe Higgins
101	25	"The Prisoner"	Joseph H. Lewis	Arthur Browne, Jr.	March 14, 1961
A former POW imprisons Lucas for his role in the Civil War. Guest stars: Joan Taylor, Adam Williams, John Dehner
102	26	"Assault"	Ida Lupino	Jay Simms	March 21, 1961
A traveling salesman is accused of forcing his attentions on a local woman. Guest stars: Linda Lawson, King Calder, Paul Mantee and Bob Sweeney
103	27	"Short Rope For A Tall Man"	Paul Landres	Tom Gries	March 28, 1961
Lucas faces lynching for unwittingly buying stolen horses. Guest stars: Hal Baylor, Norman Leavitt, William Schallert, Bert Freed
104	28	"The Clarence Bibs Story"	David Friedkin	Calvin Clements	April 4, 1961
A slow-witted handyman gets into trouble when he accidentally kills a skilled gunfighter. Guest stars: Joan Taylor, Buddy Hackett, Denver Pyle, Lee Van Cleef, John Milford
105	29	"The Score Is Even"	William F. Claxton	Fanya Foss	April 11, 1961
Lucas and Mark stumble across a robbery in progress. Guest star: Adam Williams
106	30	"The Mescalaro Curse"	Jesse Hibbs	Margaret Armen	April 18, 1961
After Lucas receives a curse while attending the hanging of a murdering Indian, he goes on a hunt to find out who or what is behind the so-called curse. Guest stars: Ralph Moody, Jackie Searl, Michael Pate
107	31	"Stopover"	Budd Boetticher	Arthur Browne, Jr.	April 25, 1961
Lucas allows troublesome snowed-in stagecoach passengers to stay with him until the roads are passable. Guest stars: Adam West, Gordon Jones, Bethel Leslie
108	32	"The Lonesome Bride"	Otto Lang	Arthur Browne, Jr.	May 2, 1961
Lucas almost finds himself at the altar when two drunken cowboys play a joke on him. Guest stars: Joan Taylor, Kay E. Kuter, Bill Quinn, Joan Shawlee
109	33	"Death Trap"	Arnold Laven	Arthur Browne, Jr.	May 9, 1961
An ex-gunfighter from Lucas' past, now a doctor, comes to his aid when a dying man is brought in, but Lucas and the new doctor have unresolved anger toward each other. Guest stars: Philip Carey, Gigi Perreau, John Pickard, William Kendis, Steve Pendleton, James Drury
110	34	"The Queue"	James Clavell	Beverly Fix, Frank Eby and Arthur Browne, Jr.	May 16, 1961
Lucas helps a Chinese man settle into town after townspeople try to force him out because of his race. Guest stars: Joan Taylor, Victor Sen Yung, Pat Close, Paul Wexler, Peter Whitney

=== Season 4 (1961–62) ===
No. overall	No. in season	Title	Directed by	Written by	Original release date
111	1	"The Vaqueros"	Joseph H. Lewis	Arthur Browne Jr.	October 2, 1961
Lucas subdues a gang of bandits singlehandedly. Guest stars: Martin Landau, Roberto Contreras, Vladimir Sokoloff, Than Wyenn, Pepe Hern . Note: This is the first episode to air on a Monday night.
112	2	"First Wages"	Gene Nelson	Ed Adamson	October 9, 1961
Mark takes a job against his father's wishes. Guest stars: Ed Nelson, Joe Higgins
113	3	"Sheer Terror"	Joseph H. Lewis	Arthur Browne Jr.	October 16, 1961
Stagecoach robbers take Mark and Milly hostage. Guest stars: Joan Taylor, Harlan Warde, Paul Wexler
114	4	"The Stand-In"	Joseph H. Lewis	Arthur Browne Jr.	October 23, 1961
A prison wagon carrying a condemned killer passes through North Fork. Guest stars: Richard Devon, Dabbs Greer, Charles Cooper
115	5	"The Journey Back"	Joseph H. Lewis	Herman Groves	October 30, 1961
A new neighbor of the McCains' gives Mark a job on his ranch. Guest stars: John Anderson, John Milford, Harry Carey Jr., Mel Carter, Chris Alcaide
116	6	"The Decision"	Gene Nelson	Ed Adamson	November 6, 1961
A killer's rich father tries to bribe witness Lucas. Guest stars: Denver Pyle, Hampton Fancher, Kevin Hagen, Arlyne Varden (credited as Arlyne Lampshire), Richard Kiel, Henry Norell
117	7	"Knight Errant"	Gene Nelson	Jay Simms	November 13, 1961
An eccentric old friend of Lucas' arrives in North Fork. Guest stars: Lawrence Dobkin, Sean McClory, Jack Elam
118	8	"Honest Abe"	Joseph H. Lewis	Michael Morris	November 20, 1961
A kindly neighbor (Royal Dano) of Lucas' believes he is President Lincoln. Guest stars: Royal Dano, Charles Cooper, K.T. Stevens, and Pick Temple
119	9	"The Long Goodbye"	Gene Nelson	Marian Carpenter, Jack Lewis	November 27, 1961
The North Fork Town Council feels that an old man is incapable of raising his grandson. Guest stars: Joan Taylor, Edgar Buchanan, Virginia Christine, Bill Zuckert
120	10	"The Shattered Idol"	Joseph H. Lewis	Margaret Armen	December 4, 1961
Mark Twain visits North Fork. Guest stars: Kevin McCarthy, Jack Elam, John Harmon
121	11	"Long Gun from Tucson"	Joseph H. Lewis	Calvin Clements	December 11, 1961
The townspeople leave Lucas to face killers alone. Guest stars: Peter Whitney, Whit Bissell, Brian G. Hutton, Billy E. Hughes
122	12	"High Country"	Gene Nelson	Calvin Clements	December 18, 1961
Lucas is accidentally responsible for the death of a young mountain boy. Guest stars: James Coburn, Booth Colman, Ellen Corby, Valora Noland
123	13	"A Friend In Need"	Gene Nelson	Arthur Browne Jr.	December 25, 1961
Lucas is stunned when Mark is kidnapped and a $5,000 ransom is asked. Guest stars: Joan Taylor, Harlan Warde, Parley Baer, Tom Snyder
124	14	"Skull"	William F. Claxton	Arthur Browne Jr.	January 1, 1962
Outlaws force Lucas to help with a prison break. Guest stars: Lyle Bettger, Lewis Charles, Tom Brown, Don Drysdale, John Alvin
125	15	"The Princess"	Robert Butler	Pat Fielder	January 8, 1962
A young girl seeks refuge at the McCain ranch for herself and her ill brother. Guest stars: Annie Fargue, Michel Petit, Stephen Bekassy, Ron Penfound
126	16	"Gunfire"	Richard Donner	Arthur Browne Jr.	January 15, 1962
A gang comes to town to free a jailed member. Guest stars: Lon Chaney Jr., Ross Elliot, Joe Higgins, Grant Richards
127	17	"Quiet Fear"	Gene Nelson	Arthur Browne Jr.	January 22, 1962
A drifter forces his attentions on a deaf girl. Guest stars: Patrick McVey, Richard Rust, Dennis Cross
128	18	"Sporting Chance"	Gene Nelson	Arthur Browne Jr.	January 29, 1962
A dapper man arrives on the stage and announces that he has come to kill Lucas. Guest stars: Joan Taylor, Arthur Malet, James Luisi
129	19	"Young Man's Fancy"	Joseph H. Lewis	Arthur Browne Jr.	February 5, 1962
Mark falls head-over-heels in to his first puppy love. Guest stars: Joan Taylor, Cheryl Holdridge, Richard Evans
130	20	"Man From Salinas"	Lawrence Dobkin	Arthur Browne Jr.	February 12, 1962
A young man arrives in North Fork to claim the body of his dead brother. Guest stars: Robert Culp, Jack Hogan, Ralph Moody, Harlan Warde
131	21	"Two Ounces Of Tin"	Arnold Laven	Calvin Clements	February 19, 1962
A young gunman with a killer's reputation comes to town and threatens to kill Micah. Guest stars: Sammy Davis Jr., Johnny Ginger
132	22	"Deadly Image"	Richard Donner	Philip Saltzman	February 26, 1962
Lucas is accused of cold-blooded murder by a man who claims to have been an eyewitness. Guest stars: Leonard Stone, Robert Bice, Bill Quinn
133	23	"The Debt"	Richard Donner	Calvin Clements	March 5, 1962
Mark deliberately disobeys his father for the first time when he allows a convicted prisoner who saved his life to escape. Guest stars: Hank Patterson, Keith Andes
134	24	"Tinhorn"	Lawrence Dobkin	Paul Mazursky, Skippy Adelman	March 12, 1962
Lucas suddenly develops the habit of playing all-night poker in the local saloon. Guest stars: Joan Taylor, Grace Lee Whitney, Larry Thor, Grant Richards
135	25	"None So Blind"	Paul Wendkos	Cyril Hume	March 19, 1962
A banjo-playing wanderer, hunting the man who caused his blindness, befriends Mark. Guest stars: Cliff Osmond, Jeff York
136	26	"Jealous Man"	Lawrence Dobkin	Peter Germano, Calvin Clements	March 26, 1962
Jake Owens and his beautiful young wife buy the ranch adjoining the McCains'. Guest stars: Mort Mills, Diane Brewster, Richard Garland, Rex Holman
137	27	"Guilty Conscience"	Richard Donner	Cyril Hume	April 2, 1962
An aging Southern belle and her teenage son arrive in North Fork and immediately identify Micah as her long-lost husband and father of the boy. Guest stars: Lee Patrick, Tom Nolan, Argentina Brunetti, Chubby Johnson
138	28	"Day Of Reckoning"	Lawrence Dobkin	Calvin Clements	April 9, 1962
North Fork welcomes a new minister (Royal Dano), but Lucas knows he is a former outlaw and an ex-convict. Guest stars: Royal Dano, Warren Oates, L.Q. Jones, Billy E. Hughes
139	29	"The Day A Town Slept"	Richard Donner	Calvin Clements	April 16, 1962
The McCains return from a trip to learn Micah has been voted out as marshal and a stranger now has the job. Guest stars: James Best, Lawrence Dobkin
140	30	"Milly's Brother"	Richard Donner	Arthur Browne Jr.	April 23, 1962
A handsome gambler moves into town and begins wooing Milly Scott, claiming to have known her deceased brother. Guest stars: Joan Taylor, Richard Anderson
141	31	"Outlaw's Shoes"	Richard Donner	Calvin Clements	April 30, 1962
Lucas develops temporary amnesia from a head injury while visiting a strange town and mistakenly assumes the identity of a wanted criminal. Guest stars: Michael Greene, Paul Wexler, William Woodson, Stanley Adams, Tom Gilson, Roy Barcroft, Mel Carter
142	32	"The Executioner"	Lawrence Dobkin	Adam Williams	May 7, 1962
A former friend of Lucas', out to recover some stolen money he had hidden on the McCain ranch, is released from prison and asks Lucas for a job. Guest stars: Adam Williams, John Davis Chandler, Michael Pate

=== Season 5 (1962–63) ===
No. overall	No. in season	Title	Directed by	Written by	Original release date
143	1	"Waste"	Joseph H. Lewis	Robert Culp	October 1, 1962
144	2	"Waste"	Joseph H. Lewis	Robert Culp	October 8, 1962
When Miach and the McCains enter a "ghost town", a bandit group take them prisoners. One of the bandits is married to a woman (Enid Jaynes) who is about to give birth and Lucas must deliver it rather than escape. Guest stars: Vito Scotti, Alex Montoya, Pepe Hern, Tony Rosa
145	3	"Lou Mallory"	Arnold Laven	Arthur Browne, Jr.	October 15, 1962
Red-headed beauty Lou Mallory (Patricia Blair) arrives in North Fork and buys a hotel. Guest stars: Peter Whitney, Conlan Carter, Mel Carter, Bill Quinn
146	4	"Quiet Night, Deadly Night"	Arnold Laven	Arthur Browne, Jr.	October 22, 1962
Lucas, Lou Mallory, Doctor Burrage and two innocent bystanders are trapped in the hotel with dangerous outlaw Lee Coyle (Ed Ames) after a smallpox epidemic. Guest stars: Patricia Blair, Ralph Moody
147	5	"Death Never Rides Alone"	Joseph H. Lewis	David P. Harmon	October 29, 1962
A former gunfighter friend of Lucas (Lee Van Cleef) arrives in town intent on settling down and living quietly. Guest stars: Rex Holman, Joe Higgins, Bill Quinn
148	6	"I Take This Woman"	Joseph H. Lewis	David P. Harmon	November 5, 1962
A charming Irishman (Sean McClory) comes to town announcing that he is there to claim Lou Mallory as his bride. Guest stars: Patricia Blair, Charles Cooper, Joe Higgins
149	7	"The Assailants"	Arthur H. Nadel	Herman Groves	November 12, 1962
A group of assassins disguised as cavalry soldiers try to murder an influential visiting senator (Edward Platt). Guest stars: Patricia Blair, John Milford, Noam Pitlik, William Bryant, Joe Higgins
150	8	"Mark's Rifle"	Arnold Laven	Oliver Crawford	November 19, 1962
Mark befriends a young man (Mark Goddard) who arrives in town to promote a circus and then quickly becomes a robbery suspect. Guest stars: Patricia Blair, Ralph Moody, Eddie Quillan
151	9	"The Most Amazing Man"	Arthur H. Nadal	Robert Lewin	November 26, 1962
Wade Randall (Sammy Davis, Jr.) appears in town, bragging of his gun battles with notorious bad men, until one of them (Richard Devon) shows up to challenge him. Guest stars: Patricia Blair, Pat Henry
152	10	"Squeeze Play"	Joseph H. Lewis	Ed Adamson	December 3, 1962
An unscrupulous land buyer (Gerald Mohr) tries to purchase the McCain ranch for a railroad eminent domain. Guest stars: Patricia Blair, Chris Alcaide, Dean Fredericks
153	11	"Gun Shy"	Arthur H. Nadel	Lois Meyers, Cyril Hume	December 10, 1962
Mark develops an intense aversion of his father's rifle after a shooting accident takes the life of his friend (Jimmy Carter). Guest stars: Patricia Blair, Bill Quinn, Peter Whitney, Jay Nelson
154	12	"The Anvil Chorus"	Arnold Laven	Arthur Browne, Jr.	December 17, 1962
Outlaws, who had elected not to rob North Branch due to its heavily-armed reputation, change their minds upon learning of a new policy disarming the citizenry. Guest star: Norman Alden
155	13	"Conflict"	Arthur H. Nadel	Ed Adamson	December 24, 1962
While out on a cougar hunt, a frightening incident causes Lucas to lose faith in his ability as a rifleman. Guest stars: Patricia Blair, Ralph Moody, Rhodes Reason, Eddie Quillan
156	14	"Incident at Line Shack Six"	Arnold Laven	Calvin Clements	January 7, 1963
A murder occurs at a railroad camp near town, and a young Indian friend of Lucas' is accused of the killing. Guest stars: Patricia Blair, Paul Mantee, John Anderson, Raymond Guth, Ray Kellogg
157	15	"Suspicion"	Joseph H. Lewis	Jay Simms	January 14, 1963
Lucas and Mark find Winslow Quince (Kevin McCarthy) stranded in the desert with a broken wheel on his wagon and help him to get to town. Quince is later blamed for a series of murders and robberies. Guest stars: Patricia Blair, Joe Higgins, Bill Quinn, William Fawcett
158	16	"The Sidewinder"	Joseph H. Lewis	Robert Lewin	January 21, 1963
Grid Maul, a boy not much older than Mark, confronts Lucas with the announcement that he intends to kill him to avenge his father's death. Guest stars: Patricia Blair, Joe Higgins, Billy E. Hughes
159	17	"The Sixteenth Cousin"	Arthur H. Nadel	Arthur Browne, Jr.	January 28, 1963
North Fork welcomes the arrival of the first train on the new railroad and with it, visitors that include a royal cousin of the Emperor of Japan (John Fujioka). Guest stars: Patricia Blair, Vito Scotti, Charles Maxwell, Paul Sorensen
160	18	"Hostages To Fortune"	Arthur H. Nadel	Cyril Hume	February 4, 1963
Lucas' faith in his son's honesty is shaken when he hears rumors that Mark may be mixed up with some thieves. Guest stars: Maurice Dallimore, Tony Haig, I. Stanford Jolley, Paul Mazursky
161	19	"And the Devil Makes Five"	Joseph H. Lewis	Arthur Browne, Jr.	February 11, 1963
Lucas and Mark, returning from a fishing trip in the mountains, encounter Micah, who is escorting prisoner Scully Potter (Lonny Chapman) to Santa Fe.
162	20	"End Of The Hunt"	Arthur H. Nadel	Jay Simms	February 18, 1963
Lucas, ordinarily a patient and reasonable man, turns vengeful after learning an old enemy (Jeff Morrow) is in town. Guest stars: Patricia Blair, Joe Higgins, K.T. Stevens
163	21	"The Bullet"	Joseph H. Lewis	Lowell Barrington	February 25, 1963
Away on a trip for the Cattleman's Association, Lucas rescues a man and is drawn into a fight with the crooked owner of a gambling establishment (Richard Anderson). Guest stars: Harold J. Stone, Norman Leavitt, Dal McKennon
164	22	"Requiem At Mission Springs"	Arthur H. Nadel	Margaret Armen	March 4, 1963
Mark is injured in an accident, which leaves his legs paralyzed. The doctor suggests mineral baths at Mission Springs to help. There, a gang of Yuma Prison escapees are hiding. Guest stars: Patricia Blair, Ralph Moody, Dean Fredericks, George Lindsey
165	23	"The Guest"	Joseph H. Lewis	Ed Adamson	March 11, 1963
A charming stranger (Cesare Danova) arrives at the McCain ranch and identifies himself as an acquaintance of an old friend of Lucas. Guest stars: Patricia Blair, Walter Sande
166	24	"Old Man, Running"	Arthur H. Nadel	A. Martin Zweiback	March 18, 1963
An old man (John Anderson) appears in North Fork asking for Micah's protection from a gang of criminals who are after him. Guest stars: Patricia Blair, Joe Higgins, Adam Williams, Arthur Batanides
167	25	"Which Way'd They Go?"	Arthur H. Nadel	Arthur Browne, Jr.	March 25, 1963
The hillbilly Jackman family are installed as peace officers in a town near North Fork. Guest stars: Peter Whitney, Vito Scotti, Conlan Carter, Mickey Manners, Beatrice Kay, Dal McKennon, Leo Gordon
168	26	"Old Tony"	Joseph H. Lewis	Thomas Thompson	April 8, 1963
The recluse Old Tony (Stefan Schnabel) helps Lucas rescue Mark and his girlfriend Lorrie (Karen Sue Trent) from quicksand. (Trent was injured in the quicksand scene, which led to her decision to retire from filmmaking.) Guest stars: Karen Sue Trent, Martin Kosleck
