= Sixpack Annie =

1975 film by Graydon F. David

- Directed by: Graydon F. David
- Written by: Norman Winski; David Kidd; Wil David
- Story by: Norman Winski
- Produced by: John C. Broderick
- Starring: Lindsay Bloom; Jana Bellan; Joe Higgins; Larry Mahan; Ray Danton; Richard Kennedy; Danna Hansen; Pedro Gonzalez Gonzalez; Sid Melton; Louisa Moritz
- Cinematography: Daniel Lacambre
- Edited by: J. H. Arrufat
- Music by: Raoul Kraushaar
- Production company: United Producers Organization
- Distributed by: American International Pictures
- Release date: December 10, 1975; (Los Angeles premiere)
- Running time: 79 minutes
- Country: United States
- Language: English

Sixpack Annie is a 1975 American comedy film directed by Graydon F. David. The film was aimed at the drive-in theatre circuit that was advertised with tags "Lookout... She's Legal Now! She's Out to Tear the Town Apart!" and "She's got the boys glad and the sheriff mad", amongst others. Another tagline used was "She's the pop top princess with the recyclable can." It starred Lindsay Bloom in the title role of Annie Bodine and Joe Higgins as Sheriff Waters. Other actors included Larry Mahan, Ray Danton, Louisa Moritz, Bruce Boxleitner, Doodles Weaver and Stubby Kaye. Adverts depicted a pre-Daisy Duke kind of character, a buxom country gal in a tied-front top and tiny cut-off jeans opening an oversized can of beer. The picture carried an MPAA R rating due to language and one nude scene.

== Plot ==
In the Southern United States community of Titwillow, two attractive young women, Annie (Lindsay Bloom) and Mary Lou (Jana Bellan) are on their way to work at the diner. Annie is behind the wheel of the pickup truck and speeds while drinking beer. The local redneck law officer, Sheriff Waters (Joe Higgins) pursues the truck to the diner but, upon entering, steps on a banana peel and takes a pratfall to the delight of diner old-timers Hank (Doodles Weaver) and Luke (Ronald Marriott) who were watching the peel.

The girls' employer, Aunt Tess (Danna Hansen), is on the verge of losing her diner to the banker, Mr. Piker (Donald Elson), because she is 5,641 dollars and 87 cents behind on the mortgage. Sheriff Waters arrests Annie and her boyfriend Bobby Joe (Bruce Boxleitner) for nude swimming, but later releases her and offers to pay Aunt Tess' indebtedness if Annie would marry him. When Annie comes to him, however, he only has few hundred dollars, intending to make up the remainder from "collecting parking tickets".

Annie and Mary Lou drive to Miami where Annie's sister Flora (Louisa Moritz) lives in an elegant apartment, hoping to borrow the mortgage money from her, but Flora's inadequate earnings appear to derive from men who pay her for sexually entertaining them. One of her customers, a nervous married man (Sid Melton), develops a sneezing problem and hides in a large wicker basket when Annie and Mary Lou arrive. Flora suggests that Annie find a sugar daddy to fund her needs, but wealthy Frenchman Louis Danton (Oscar Cartier) is revealed to have a Napoleon complex, replete with uniform, sword and wooden horse head on a stick. Mr. O'Meyer (Raymond Danton), a confidence trickster, who also calls himself "Oscar Meyer", claims to be "as rich as Rockefeller", but after tricking Annie into an intimate encounter, steals what little money she had and leaves her a note signed "The City Slicker". Finally, another candidate, moneyed Texan Jack Whittlestone (Richard Kennedy) turns out to have a violently possessive wife Edna (Montana Smoyer) who pushes a shotgun barrel up to his nose.

Discouraged and disillusioned, Annie and Mary Lou return to the diner in Titwillow where, just as Sheriff Waters and banker Piker arrive to finalize the foreclosure, Mr. Bates (Stubby Kaye), a salesman who is also a jewelry collector, examines Annie's necklace and offers her 7,000 dollars for it. The frustrated sheriff puts his wide-brimmed hat, into which Mary Lou had poured milk, on his head and, on his way out, bumps into a midget baker (unbilled Billy Barty) carrying white cream pies, one of which winds up smeared over the sheriff's face.

== Cast ==
- Lindsay Bloom as Sixpack Annie Bodine
- Jana Bellan as Mary Lou
- Joe Higgins as Sheriff Waters
- Larry Mahan as Bustis
- Raymond Danton as Mr. O'Meyer
- Richard Kennedy as Jack Whittlestone
- Danna Hansen as Aunt Tess
- Pedro Gonzalez Gonzalez as Carmello
- Bruce Boxleitner as Bobby Joe
- Louisa Moritz as Flora
- Vince Barnett as Bartender
- Steve Randall as Long John
- Doodles Weaver as Hank
- Ronald Marriott as Luke
- Donald Elson as Mr. Piker
- Oscar Cartier as Louis Danton
- Montana Smoyer as Edna Whittlestone
- Ralph James as Ace
- Terry Mace as John
- Danny Michael Mann as Tony
- Stubby Kaye as Mr. Bates
- Peter Dane
- Billy Barty as person of short stature carrying pies in the final scene (uncredited)

== Song credits ==
- Song – "Sixpack Annie"; words and music by Minette Allton and Melissa Wilson; sung by Tim Hayfield
- Song – "Them Red Hot Nuts"; words and music by Ron Carver and Denise Rabin

== Reception ==
Columnist Vernon Scott wrote about Lindsay Bloom in Sixpack Annie, saying, "Lindsay Bloom plays a beer-guzzling, truck-driving Southern belle. Her scanty wardrobe reveals a great deal of Lindsay Bloom. 'Some of the language I use is pretty salty,' she said. 'That and the nude scene is why they gave it an 'R' rating. To give you an idea how subtle the picture is, Annie lives in a town named Titwillow. But it's a start. It's led to the possibility of a major movie at Warner Brothers. These days a young actress has to take one step at a time."

== See also ==
- List of American films of 1975
