= I Take This Woman =

I Take This Woman may refer to:

- I Take This Woman (1931 film), a romance film starring Gary Cooper and Carole Lombard
- I Take This Woman (1940 film), a drama film about suicide, featuring Spencer Tracy and Hedy Lamarr
- "I Take This Woman" (The Rifleman), a 1962 episode of the TV series The Rifleman
- Ek Chadar Maili Si (English translation: I Take This Woman), Rajinder Singh Bedi's Urdu novel
