= The Cockeyed Cowboys of Calico County =

1970 film by Ranald MacDougall

- Directed by: Anton Leader; Ranald MacDougall
- Written by: Ranald MacDougall
- Produced by: Ranald MacDougall
- Starring: Dan Blocker; Nanette Fabray
- Cinematography: Richard L. Rawlings
- Edited by: Richard G. Wray
- Music by: Lyn Murray
- Color process: Technicolor
- Production company: Universal Pictures
- Distributed by: Universal Pictures
- Release date: 1970
- Running time: 99 minutes
- Country: United States
- Language: English

The Cockeyed Cowboys of Calico County is a 1970 American comedy Western film by Universal Pictures, directed by Anton Leader and Ranald MacDougall, and starring Dan Blocker and Nanette Fabray, with a supporting cast featuring: Jim Backus, Mickey Rooney, Wally Cox, Jack Elam, Noah Beery, Jr., Jack Cassidy and Don "Red" Barry. MacDougal wrote the screenplay. It was originally intended as a television film but was ultimately released as a theatrical feature.

The film became Blocker's final role (besides his long-running role as "Hoss Cartwright" on Bonanza) before his death from complications from gall bladder surgery, in May 1972. In late 2010, the Encore Westerns channel began showing this film intermittently on their schedule.

== Plot ==
Shy naive Charley Bicker, the only blacksmith within 100 miles (161 km), begins corresponding with a potential mail-order bride, named Ellen, and sends her all his savings for a train ticket to the town of Calico. He kept his marriage plans secret from everyone except the storekeeper who sent off for a wedding ring, but the storekeeper told everyone else, so a crowd shows up at the train station when Charley goes there to meet his bride. The lady isn't on the train and Charley is humiliated, so pretends it was all a joke.

Meanwhile, a nearly-blind bounty hunter named Kittrick comes to town and tries to find his way to the sheriff's office.

Charley believes he is the laughing-stock of the town, and starts packing up to start a new life elsewhere. The townsfolk are in a panic, for they need their blacksmith. Mr. Bester, who owns a freight hauling business, has all his wagons at the blacksmith shop for repairs, and if they aren't repaired no businesses can get new supplies. It is decided to say Charley's mail-order bride got off at the wrong town, and will be arriving on the stagecoach. They will need to find someone to pretend to be the lady Charley was corresponding with, who will agree to be courted for a few days, and then politely say she changed her mind about marriage.

The only single woman in town is saloon girl Sadie, who is seeing Roger Hand – a man who is jealous of anyone who pays attention to Sadie. Charley doesn't drink much, so he's never seen the saloon girl. At first, Sadie refuses to go along with the scheme, but then, thinks of how the respectable ladies show disapproval whenever they see her, so she'll pretend to be someone the ladies will treat as an equal.

Charley and Sadie meet, and she is charmed by how kind and gentle he is, and how well he treats her. Mrs. Bester says Sadie (pretending to be Ellen) will be staying at the Bester house. Charley tells Sadie he's fixed up a house for them to live in, if she'll consent to marrying him. They make plans to visit the house the next day. That evening Mrs. Bester hears Sadie crying in the guest room and goes to talk to her. Mrs. Bester tells her she and all the other ladies knows who she really is, but they want her to marry Charley, so their husbands won't be going to the saloon to see her sing and dance.

Roger Hand goes to visit Sadie at the saloon, and when he learns she is being courted by Charley he vows to get revenge on the blacksmith. The saloon patrons pull guns on him and tell him to leave town. Rogers says he'll leave with Sadie.

Charley and Sadie visit the house he owns. She says she loves the house, and he is a good man, but she can't marry him because she has not been a good woman.

The sheriff learns near-sighted Kittrick is in town to capture the outlaw Panama Jack. The sheriff draws on a wanted poster picture to make Panama Jack look like Roger Hand, and everyone at the saloon calls Roger by the outlaw's name. Kittrick starts shooting at Roger, who jumps on a horse and rushes out of town, with Kittrick right behind him.

Sadie returns to the saloon and, while wearing a revealing costume, begins singing a song about not caring. Charley goes to the Bester house and asks Mrs. Bester to give Sadie the key to the house he fixed up, since he won't be needing it. Mrs. Bester tells him how much Sadie cares for him. Charley goes to the saloon and tells Sadie they are getting married that very day.

== Cast ==
- Dan Blocker - Charley Bicker
- Nanette Fabray - Sadie
- Jack Elam - Kittrick
- Jim Backus - Sheriff Staunch
- Wally Cox - Mr Bester
- Mickey Rooney - Indian Tom
- Don "Red" Barry - Rusty
- Hamilton Camp - Mr Fowler
- James McCallion - Dr. Henry
- Noah Beery Jr. - Eddie
- Henry Jones - Hanson
- Marge Champion - Mrs Bester
- Jack Cassidy - Roger Hand
- Stubby Kaye - Bartender
- Byron Foulger - Rev Marshal
- Iron Eyes Cody - Crazy Foot
- Ray Ballard - Carson
- Susan Saint James - Martha Kidd
- Raven Grey - Eagle
- Michael-James Wixted - Boy at train station
