= Dan Blocker =

American actor (1928–1972)

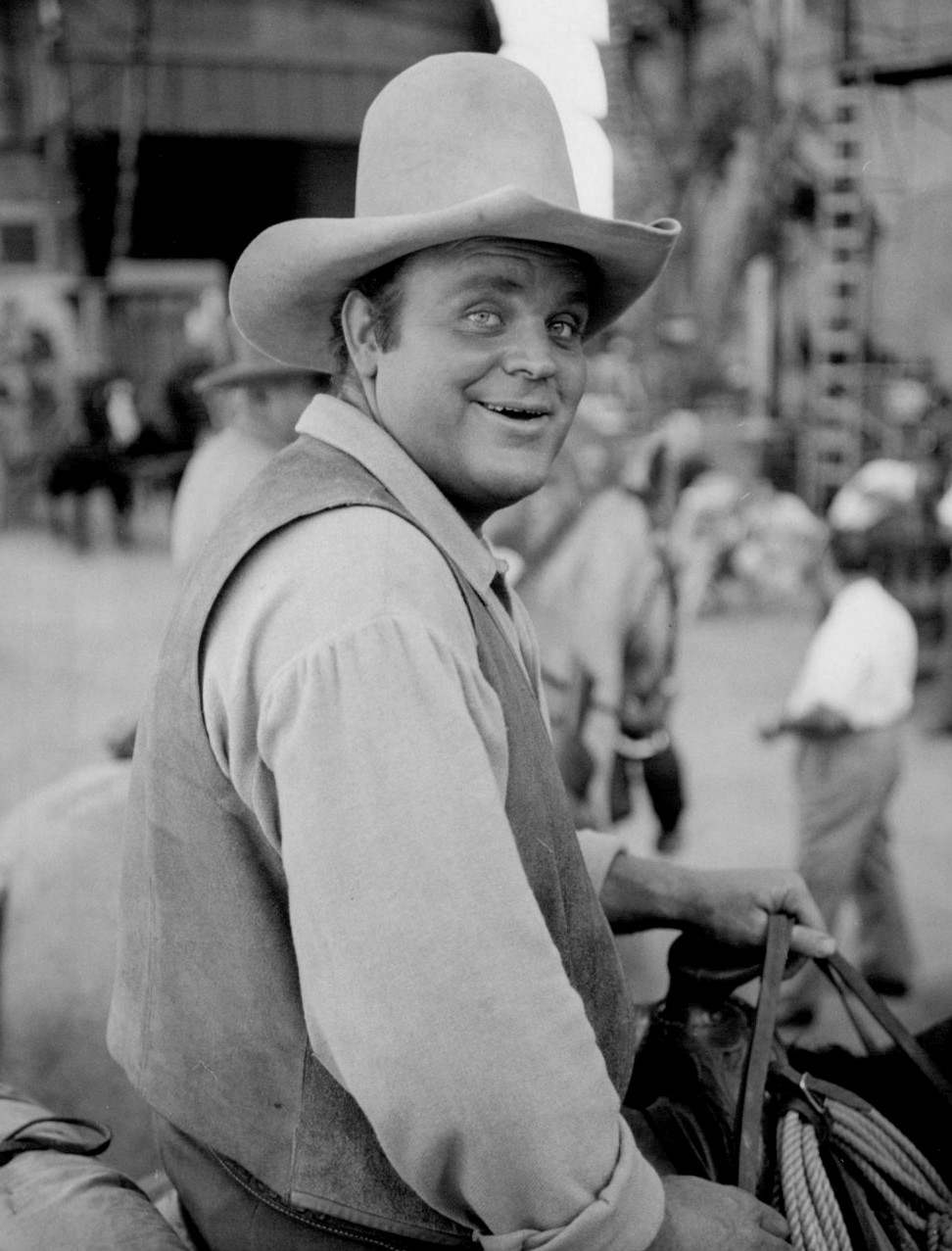
- Blocker on the set of Bonanza as Hoss Cartwright
- Born: Bobby Dan Davis Blocker; December 10, 1928; De Kalb, Texas, U.S.
- Died: May 13, 1972 (aged 43); Los Angeles, California, U.S.
- Resting place: Woodmen Cemetery in DeKalb, Texas
- Occupation: Actor
- Years active: 1955–1972
- Spouse: Dolphia Parker Blocker (m. 1952)
- Children: 4, including Dirk and David

Bobby Dan Davis Blocker (December 10, 1928 – May 13, 1972) was an American television actor and Korean War veteran, who played Hoss Cartwright in the NBC Western television series Bonanza.

== Biography ==
=== Early life ===
Blocker was born on December 10, 1928, in De Kalb, Texas to Ora "Shack" Blocker and Mary Arizona (Davis) Blocker.

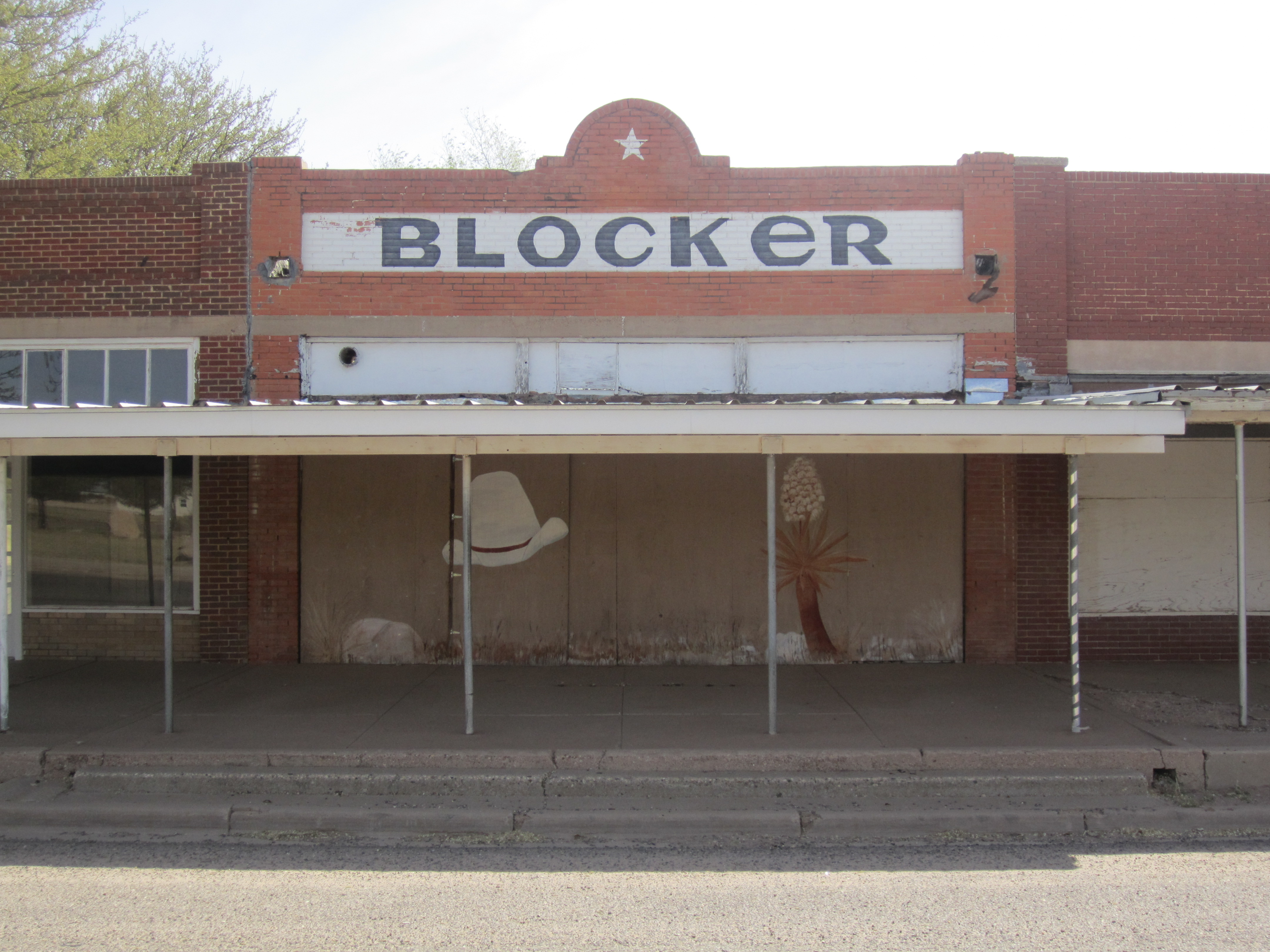
Abandoned grocery store formerly run by Blocker's parents in downtown O'Donnell, Texas, 2010

As a boy, Blocker attended Texas Military Institute. He enrolled in a San Antonio school in 1940. In 1946, Blocker played football at Southern Baptist-affiliated Hardin–Simmons University in Abilene, Texas. In 1947, he transferred to Sul Ross State Teacher's College in Alpine, Texas, where he was a star football player, and graduated in 1950 with a degree in speech and drama. After two years of military service, he earned a master's degree in the dramatic arts.

Blocker worked as a rodeo performer and a bouncer in a bar while a student. He is remembered from his school days for his height of 6 ft 4 in (1.93 m) and weight of 300 lb (140 kg), and for being good-natured despite his intimidating size.

Blocker was a high-school English and drama teacher in Sonora, Texas, from 1953 to 1954. He was a sixth-grade teacher and coach at Eddy Elementary School in Carlsbad, New Mexico, and then a teacher in California. Blocker and his wife Dolphia moved to Los Angeles, where he secured some acting roles.

=== U.S. Army ===
Blocker was drafted into the United States Army during the Korean War. He had basic training at Fort Polk, Louisiana. In Korea, he served as an infantry sergeant in F Company, 2nd Battalion, 179th Infantry Regiment, 45th Infantry Division, from December 1951 to August 1952. He received a Purple Heart for wounds in combat.

In addition to the Purple Heart, Blocker received the National Defense Service Medal, Korean Service Medal with two bronze campaign stars, Republic of Korea Presidential Unit Citation, United Nations Service Medal, Korean War Service Medal, and Combat Infantryman Badge.

=== Acting career ===
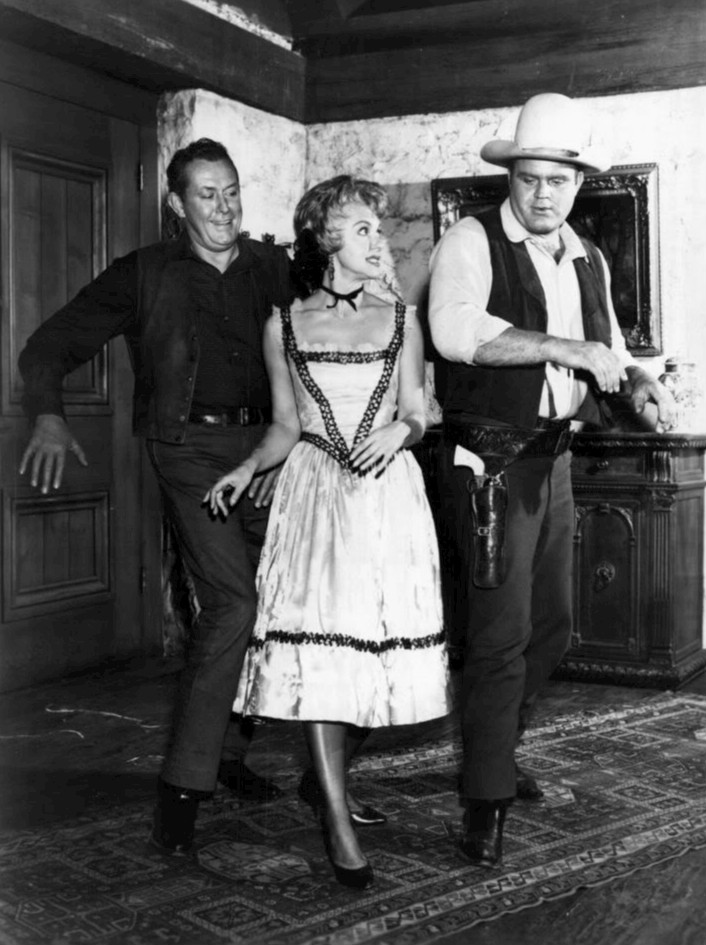
Vaughn Monroe, Susie Scott, and Dan Blocker dance in Bonanza, 1962

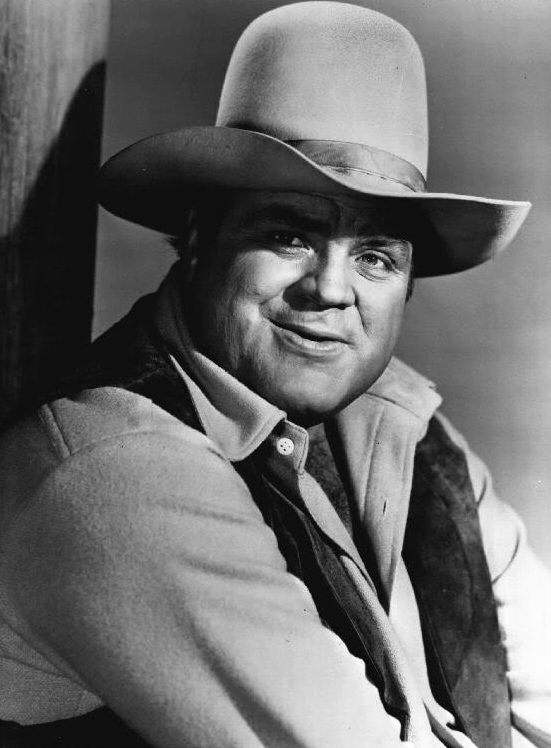
Dan Blocker in Bonanza, 1966

In 1957, Blocker appeared in a Three Stooges short, Outer Space Jitters, playing the Goon, billed as "Don Blocker".

He made two appearances on Gunsmoke. First as a cavalry lieutenant on August 24, 1956, in "Alarm at Pleasant Valley" (S1E39) and on October 18, 1958, in "Thoroughbreds". He appeared in 1957 as Will in the episode "A Time to Die" of the ABC/Warner Bros. Western series Colt .45.

In 1957, Blocker was cast in episodes of David Dortort's NBC series The Restless Gun as a blacksmith and as a cattleman planning to take his hard-earned profit to return to his family land in his native Minnesota. In 1957, he had at least two roles as a bartender in an episode of the syndicated Western-themed crime drama Sheriff of Cochise, starring John Bromfield, and in the film Gunsight Ridge. Also in 1957, he appeared in the Cheyenne episode "Land Beyond the Law", playing one of the outlaw minions (Pete). He also appeared in The Rifleman.

In 1958, he played a prison guard and later had a recurring role as Tiny Budinger in the NBC Western series Cimarron City, starring George Montgomery, John Smith and Audrey Totter. He was seen in "The Señorita Makes a Choice", a 1958 episode of Walt Disney's Zorro series, as well as an episode, "Underground Ambush", of Sergeant Preston of the Yukon, playing Mule Conklin.

In 1958, Blocker had a supporting role as Sergeant Broderick in "The Dora Gray Story" on NBC's Wagon Train. That same year, he appeared in "Stagecoach Episode" of the NBC Western Jefferson Drum, starring Jeff Richards.

In March 1958, he appeared as Joe, a thief, in season one of Have Gun – Will Travel, in the episode "Gun Shy".

Blocker was cast as bearded poker-playing rodeo performer Cloudy Sims in the 1958 episode "Rodeo" on the David Janssen crime drama, Richard Diamond, Private Detective. In the storyline, a rodeo performer named Ed Murdock, portrayed by Lee Van Cleef, is murdered before he can make his final performance at the annual event in Madison Square Garden.

Another 1959 role was as Del Pierce in "Johnny Yuma", the first episode of the ABC Western series The Rebel, starring Nick Adams.

==== Bonanza (1959–1972) ====
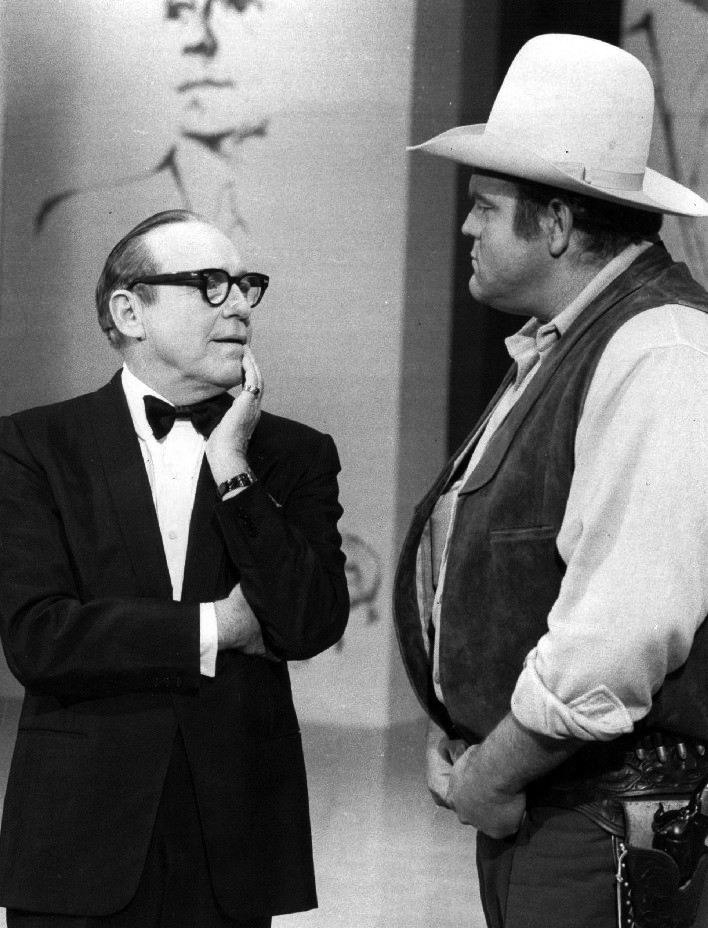
Jack Benny and Blocker, 1969

Blocker's big break came in 1959, when he was cast as Eric "Hoss" Cartwright on the NBC television series Bonanza, playing that role for over 400 episodes until his death. Blocker said he portrayed the gentle-natured Hoss character with a Stephen Grellet statement in mind: "We shall pass this way on Earth but once, if there is any kindness we can show, or good act we can do, let us do it now, for we will never pass this way again."

In 1963, Blocker starred with Frank Sinatra in the comedy Come Blow Your Horn. He worked with Sinatra again in 1968 in the Tony Rome film sequel Lady in Cement, playing a menacing tough guy. Stanley Kubrick attempted to cast Blocker in his film Dr. Strangelove, after Peter Sellers elected not to add the role of Major T.J. "King" Kong to his multiple other roles, but according to the film's co-writer, Terry Southern, Blocker's agent rejected the script. The role went to Slim Pickens, who played the iconic scene of riding an atomic bomb down while waving his cowboy hat.

In 1968, Blocker starred as John Killibrew, a blacksmith, who had convinced a number of settlers to follow him to California and founded the town of Arkana. This TV film, Something for a Lonely Man, also featured Susan Clark, John Dehner, Warren Oates, and Don Stroud. In 1970, Blocker portrayed a love-shy galoot in The Cockeyed Cowboys of Calico County, with Nanette Fabray as a love prospect and a supporting cast featuring Jim Backus, Jack Elam, Noah Beery Jr., and Mickey Rooney. Blocker also appeared on NBC's The Flip Wilson Show comedy hour.

Director Robert Altman befriended Blocker while directing episodes of Bonanza. Years later, he cast Blocker as Roger Wade in The Long Goodbye, but Blocker died before filming began. The role then went to Sterling Hayden, and the film was dedicated to Blocker.

Also in 1963, Blocker started and received partial ownership in a successful chain of Bonanza Steakhouse restaurants, in exchange for serving, in character as Hoss, as their commercial spokesman, and making personal appearances at franchises.

=== Personal life ===
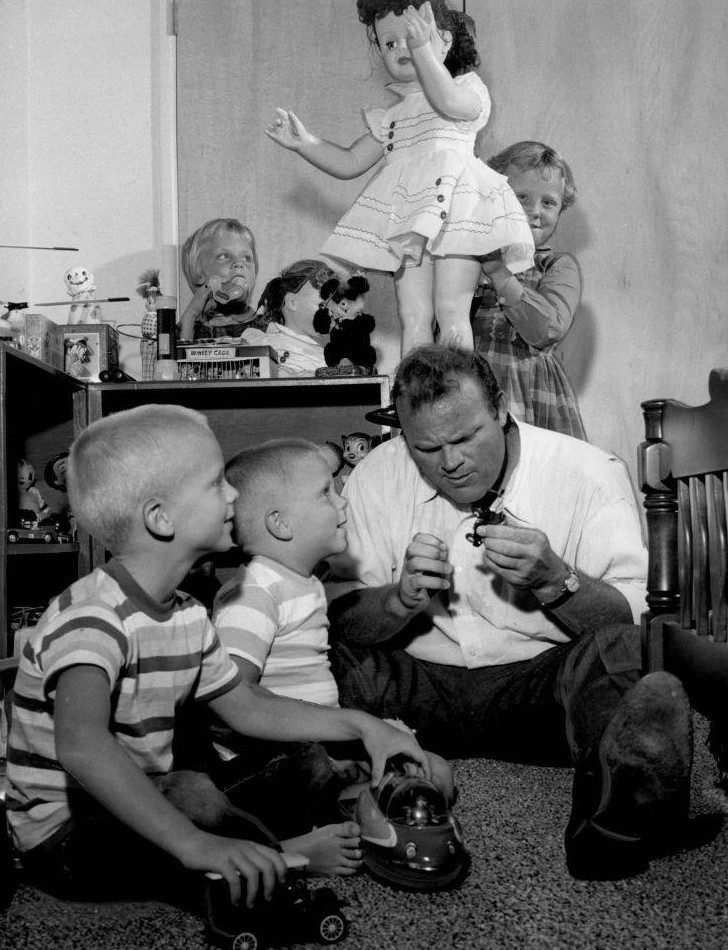
Blocker with his four children, 1960s

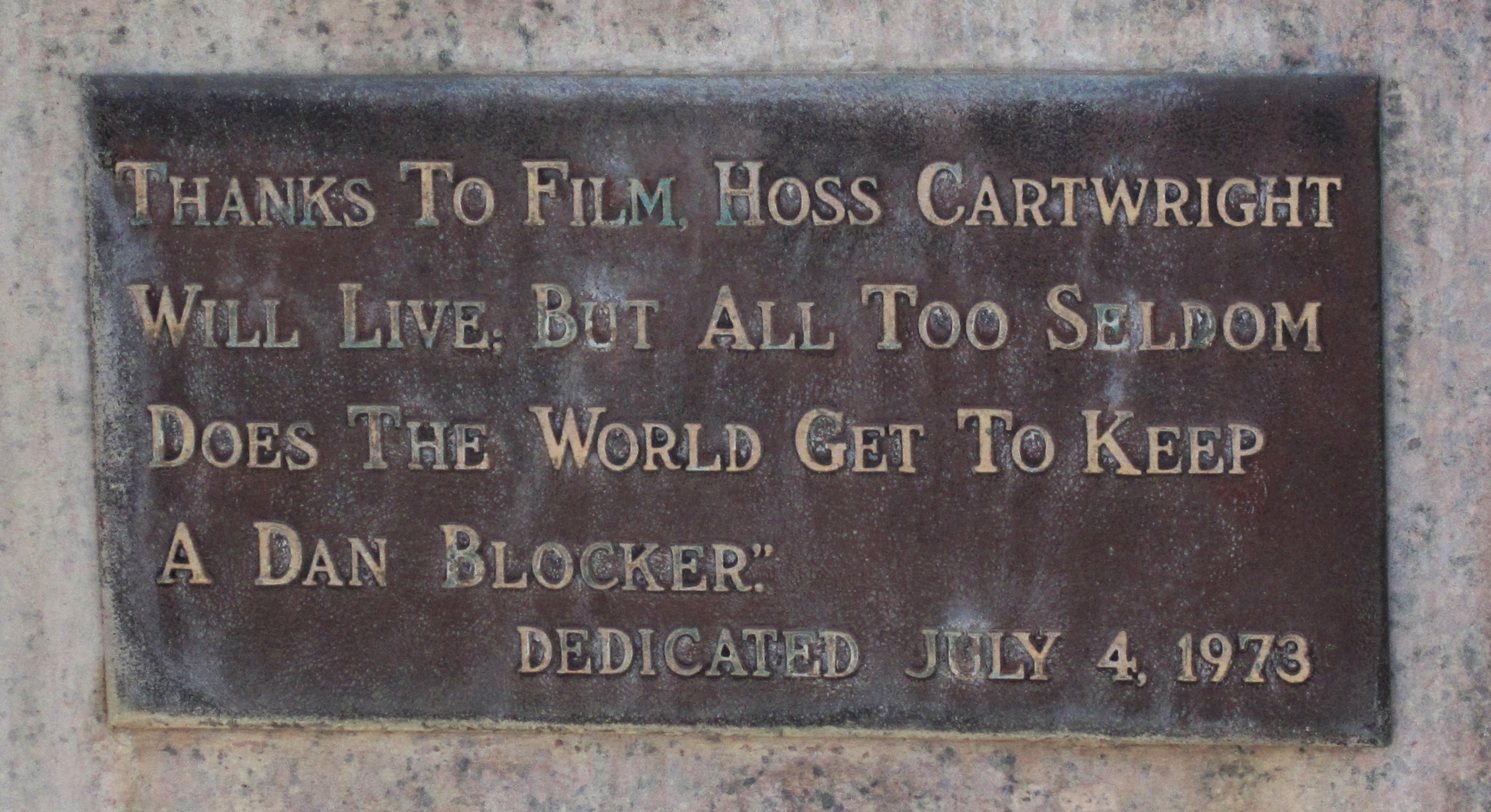
Hoss Cartwright and Dan Blocker plaque in O'Donnell, Texas, 1973

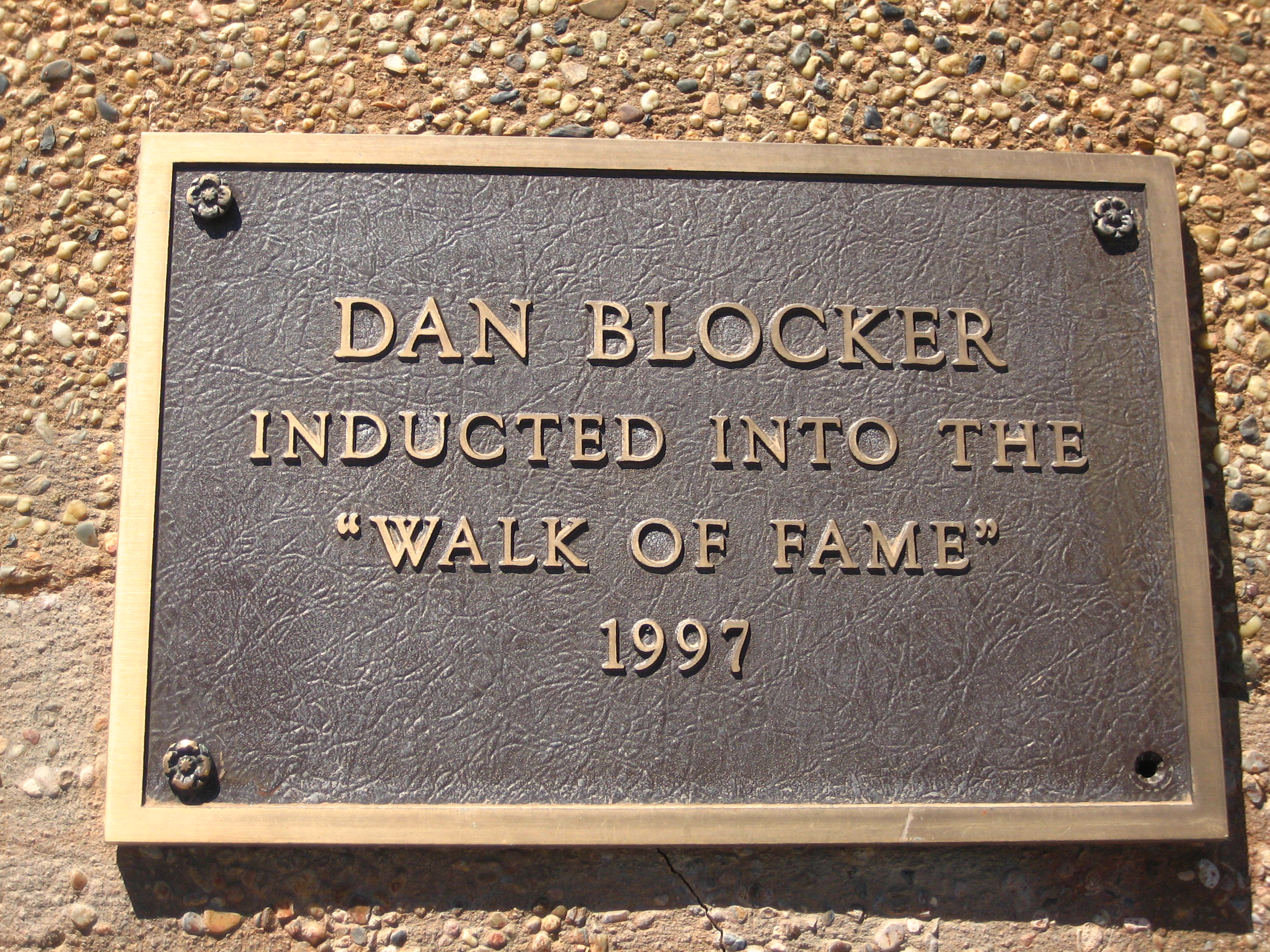
Blocker is listed on the West Texas Walk of Fame in Lubbock

Originally from Bowie County, Texas, Blocker arrived in Los Angeles in 1958 planning to do post-grad work at UCLA but began getting acting roles. Previously, while attending Sul Ross State College, he had a non-speaking part in a stage play and found that he was attracted to acting. He played in Summer Stock in Boston in 1950 after getting his degree at the college.

Blocker was a Free Methodist. He married Dolphia Parker, whom he had met while a student at Sul Ross State University. Their children are Hollywood actor Dirk Blocker, Hollywood producer David Blocker, and twin daughters Debra Lee (artist) and Danna Lynn. David Blocker won a 1998 Emmy for producing Don King: Only in America.

Blocker, a liberal Democrat, was among Hollywood celebrities who supported Pat Brown's re-election in 1966 as governor of California against Ronald Reagan. In 1968, Blocker backed then-U.S. Senator Eugene McCarthy of Minnesota for the Democratic presidential nomination. Blocker later supported the eventual Democratic Party nominee, Vice President Hubert Humphrey, also of Minnesota, for the presidency against the Republican Richard Nixon.

Blocker kept a house in Inglewood, California, and a 6,000-square-foot (560 m^{2}) Tudor-style mansion in the Hancock Park area of Los Angeles.

On the 2010 PBS special, Pioneers of Television: Westerns, actor Mitch Vogel, who played adopted brother Jamie Cartwright on Bonanza, said Blocker, "was the most down to earth—the kind of guy you could go and have a beer with."

Blocker, a performance automobile fan, once owned a 1965 Chevrolet Chevelle SS396 "Z-16" (RPO Z16 option), as Chevrolet was the commercial sponsor of the show. He also owned a 1965 Huffaker Genie MK10 race car, nicknamed the "Vinegaroon". The car was run by Nickey Chevrolet in the 1965 and 1966 U.S. Road Racing Championship series, as well as the 1966 Can-Am championship.

=== Death ===
On May 13, 1972, Blocker died in Inglewood, California, at age 43, of a pulmonary embolism, following gallbladder surgery at Daniel Freeman hospital. A news item provides these specifics: "Blocker went into the hospital for gall bladder surgery, developed a blood clot in his lung, and died".

The writers of Bonanza took the unusual step of referencing a major character's death in the show's storyline that autumn. A 2011 report added that "this was to be the first time in television history that a show had dealt with, or even mentioned, the death of one of its characters". Specifics as to the death were not discussed in the series, but some years later, in the sequel series Bonanza: The Next Generation, one character stated that "Hoss drowned trying to save another's life".

Bonanza lasted another season without Hoss, and the 14th and final season ended on January 16, 1973. That season was "by far the least popular and least requested season in the show's rerun package". Bonanza co-star Michael Landon said years later that whenever he needed to cry for a scene, he would think of Dan Blocker's death.

Blocker's remains were interred in a family plot in Woodmen Cemetery, in De Kalb, Texas. The common grave site is marked by a plain stone with the name "B. Dan D. Blocker" engraved. Three family members are buried beside him – his father, mother, and sister.

Dan's wife, Dolphia died on April 19, 2026 from a stroke at a local hospital near her home in Santa Barbara, California. She was 93.

== Filmography ==
Year	Title	Role	Notes
1957	The Girl in Black Stockings	Mike, the Bartender	
1957	Black Patch	Blacksmith	Uncredited
1957	Gunsight Ridge	Bartender	Uncredited
1957	Outer Space Jitters	The Goon	Three Stooges Short
1959	The Young Captives	Oil Field Roughneck	
1961	The Errand Boy	Hoss Cartwright	Uncredited cameo
1963	Come Blow Your Horn	Mr. Eckman	
1968	Lady in Cement	Waldo Gronsky	
1968	Something for a Lonely Man	John Kilibrew	
1970	The Cockeyed Cowboys of Calico County	Charley	

== Television ==
Year	Title	Role	Note
1957-8	Cheyenne	Pete/Deputy Sam	2 episodes
1957-8	The Restless Gun	Olaf Burland / Jub Buckstar / John 'El Bruto' / Fred Burgermen / Ike Burnett	5 episodes
1958	Have Gun – Will Travel	Joe	Episode: "Gun Shy"
1958	Decision	Salem	Episode: "The Virginian"
1958	The Rifleman	Pete Snipe	Episode: "The Sister"
1958	Gunsmoke	Lieutenant / Keller	Episodes: "Alarm at Pleasant Valley", "Thoroughbreds"
1959-1972	Bonanza	Eric 'Hoss' Cartwright / Big Jack Slade	415 episodes (final appearance)
1959	The Rebel	Pierce	Episode: "Johnny Yuma" (series premiere)
1971	The Flip Wilson Show	Himself	Episode 16

== Namings ==
The following are named after Blocker:

- The Dan Blocker Room is on the second floor of the O'Donnell Heritage Museum in O'Donnell, Texas, where he was brought up.
- Dan Blocker Beach is in Malibu, California.
- Dan Blocker Avenue is a street in the Boulder Ranch development in Henderson, Nevada.
