= Patricia Blair =

American TV and film actress (1933–2013)

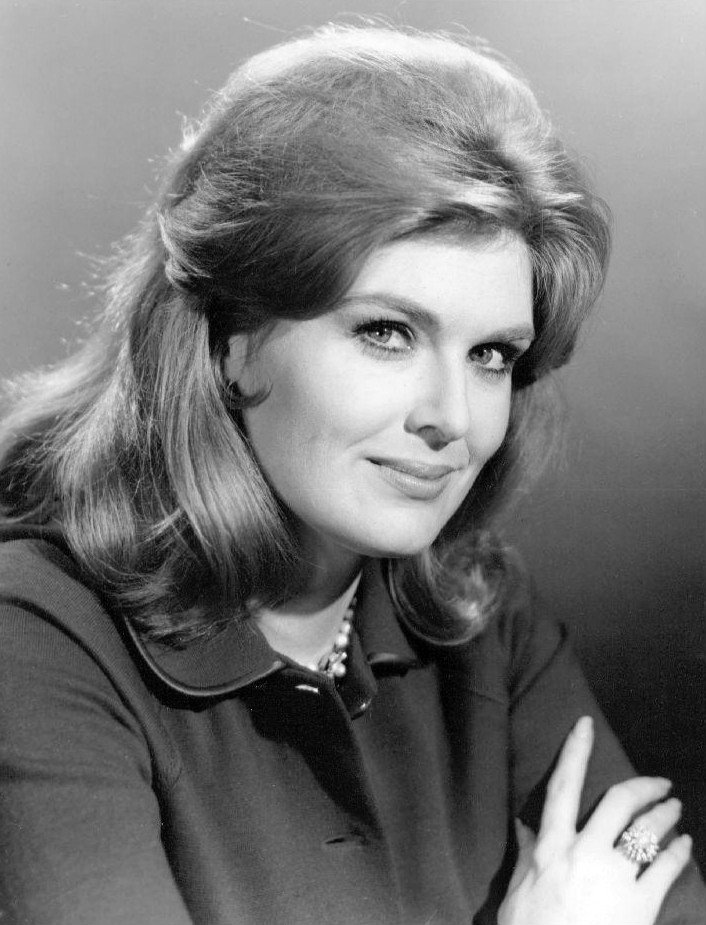
- Blair in 1970
- Born: Patsy Lou Blake; January 15, 1933; Fort Worth, Texas, U.S.
- Died: September 9, 2013 (aged 80); North Wildwood, New Jersey, U.S.
- Other names: Patricia Blake; Pat Blake
- Occupations: Film, television actress
- Years active: 1955–1979
- Known for: Daniel Boone; The Rifleman; The Electric Horseman
- Spouse: Martin S. Colbert (m. 1965; div. 1993)

Patricia Blair (born Patsy Lou Blake; January 15, 1933 – September 9, 2013) was an American television and film actress, primarily on 1950s and 1960s television. She is known for portraying American frontier woman Rebecca Boone (1739–1813), the wife of real Kentucky frontiersman Daniel Boone (1734–1820) in all six seasons of the 18th century colonial Western TV series Daniel Boone (1964–1970). She had appeared earlier in 22 episodes of The Rifleman (1962–1963).

== Biography ==
Patsy Lou Blake was born in Fort Worth, Texas and grew up further east in nearby Dallas. She became a teenage model through the Conover Modeling Agency of New York City (existed 1939-1959), of noted Harry Conover (1911-1965). While acting in summer stock, Warner Bros. discovered her and she began acting in films under the names Patricia Blake and Pat Blake. In the late 1950s she appeared as the second female lead in several films for Warner Bros. and later for MGM. Her first movie was Jump Into Hell (1955), about the Battle of Dien Bien Phu in French Indochina.

She had a recurring role as Goldy, one of Madame Francine's hostesses, on the 1958 TV series Yancy Derringer. In 1962-1963 she starred as newly-arrived hotel operator "Lou Mallory" in the later seasons of the Western The Rifleman, (replacing general store keeper "Milly Scott", played by actress Joan Taylor) as North Fork, New Mexico Territory rancher "Lucas McCain" (star Chuck Connors)'s new occasional love interest on that long-running series.

She also made a guest appearance in 1963 on Perry Mason as murderer Nicolai Wright in "The Case of the Badgered Brother". She made guest appearances as well on other television series, such as The Bob Cummings Show; Rescue 8; Gunsmoke; Richard Diamond, Private Detective; The Virginian; and Bonanza.

Blair had considered moving to New York City in 1964 until screenwriter Gordon Chase helped her get a role on the NBC series Daniel Boone (1964-1970). She played real-life wife Rebecca Boone, opposite star Fess Parker as real-life frontier pioneer leader Daniel Boone for six seasons, with Darby Hinton as son Israel Boone and future multi - Primetime Emmy Award nominee Veronica Cartwright as daughter Jemima Boone. Blair became concerned that her TV daughter, played by Cartwright, made her appear aged and she refused to sign a contract for season three unless Cartwright was dropped from the show. After the series ended in 1970, her career struggled, and she appeared in only a few minor films and television spots. Her last appearance in a feature film was in 1979, portraying a fashion narrator in The Electric Horseman starring Robert Redford. In her later years she produced trade shows in New York City and New Jersey.

On February 14, 1965, the 32-year-old Blair married 42-year-old land developer Martin S. Colbert in Los Angeles, California. The couple divorced in 1993. Colbert died in 1994.

== Death ==
Blair died at her home in North Wildwood, New Jersey, aged 80, from breast cancer.

== Selected filmography ==
=== Film ===
- Jump Into Hell (1955) - Gisele Bonet
- The McConnell Story (1955) - Wife (uncredited)
- Crime Against Joe (1956) - Christine 'Christy' Rowen
- The Black Sleep (1956) - Laurie Monroe
- City of Fear (1959) - June Marlowe
- Cage of Evil (1960) - Holly Taylor
- The Ladies Man (1961) - Working Girl
- The Electric Horseman (1979) - Fashion Narrator

=== Television ===
- The Bob Cummings Show (1957) - Joanne Taylor
- Yancy Derringer (1958) Goldy
- The Dennis O'Keefe Show (May 10, 1960) - Gretchen Clayhipple
- Tramp Ship (1961, Episode: "pilot")
- The Rifleman (1962–1963, 22 episodes) - Lou Mallory
- My Three Sons (1963) - Valerie
- The Virginian (1963) - Rita Marlow
- Perry Mason (1963) - Nicolai Wright
- Bonanza (1964, Episode: "The Lila Conrad Story") - Lila Conrad
- Daniel Boone (1964–1970, 118 episodes) - Rebecca Boone
- Dusty's Trail (1973) - Mary Ellen Barstow
