= Something for a Lonely Man =

1968 TV film

- Written by: John Fante; Frank Fenton
- Directed by: Don Taylor
- Starring: Dan Blocker; Susan Clark; John Dehner; Warren Oates; Don Stroud
- Theme music composer: Jack Marshall; Stanley Wilson
- Country of origin: United States
- Original language: English

Production
- Producer: Richard E. Lyons
- Cinematography: Benjamin H. Kline
- Editor: Robert F. Shugrue
- Running time: 97 minutes
- Production company: Universal Television

Original release
- Network: NBC
- Release: November 26, 1968

Something for a Lonely Man is a 1968 American Western television film. It was first broadcast in 1968; NBC aired it a second time on December 9, 1969.

== Plot ==
John Killibrew, a blacksmith, had convinced a number of settlers to follow him to California and found the town of Arkana. When the railroad comes through the area in 1870 but bypasses the settlement, the townspeople blame him. Ten years later, when a steam engine falls off of a train into a pond, Killibrew gets an idea. He goes to San Francisco and buys the steam engine from the insurance company that had paid off on the claim. Meanwhile, Mary Duren had been teaching Killibrew how to read and developed an attraction for him, to which Killibrew is at least initially oblivious. When he returns to the town, no one will help him recover the engine, in part because the site is in the middle of hostile Indian country. Then Mary buys the mules he needs and travels with Killibrew to the site. John and Mary dig a trench to drain the pond in which the steam engine is sunk. During this time John proposes to Mary and they become engaged. However, her three brothers, who had been using Mary as their housekeeper and cook, track down John and Mary and force them into a shotgun wedding. When they return, the engine is not in the drained pond. The pair track it down and discover it was taken by the Indians. Since Killibrew used to live with the Indians many years ago, earning the sobriquet "Big Beaver", he persuades them to give the engine back to him. John and Mary haul the engine back towards the town through rain, facing a bear and temporarily losing it in a cave-in. The wagon with the engine gets stuck in a hole. The townspeople ride out and offer to help, but Killibrew, remembering their earlier refusal turns them down. When he says he doesn't need anybody to help, even Mary leaves him, as a torrential rain pours down. The banker in town plots to take the steam engine in lieu of $316.82 Killibrew owes to the bank. When Killibrew refuses to sell to the bank, the banker serves a writ on Killibrew. After Killibrew beats up the posse, Killibrew submits to arrest. Mary talks the women of the town into trying to lynch the sheriff. Mary sells enough shares in the steam engine to pay John's debt and the sheriff prudently decides to drop the other charges against Killibrew. The steam engine is hauled into town. John and Mary sneak off for their honeymoon.

== Main cast ==
Actor	Role
Dan Blocker	John Killibrew
Susan Clark	Mary Duren
John Dehner	Sam Batt
Warren Oates	Angus Duren
Paul Petersen	Pete Duren
Don Stroud	Eben Duren
Henry Jones	R.J. Hoferkamp
