= Donald Elson =

American film, stage and television actor (1923–2022)

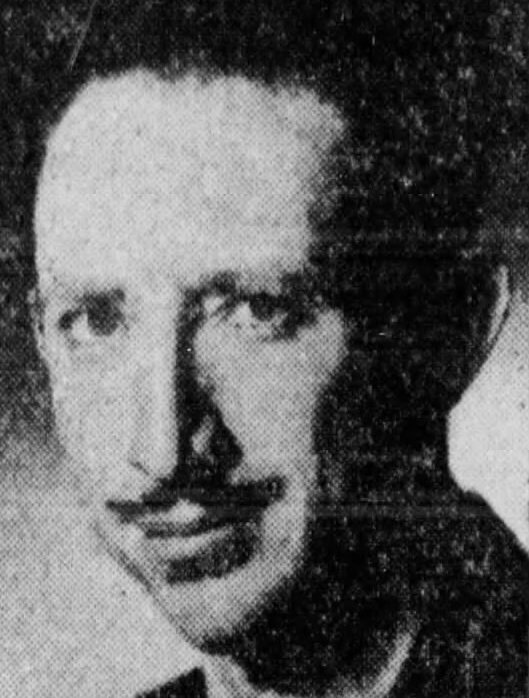
- Elson in 1957
- Born: March 31, 1923; Chicago, Illinois, U.S.
- Died: May 7, 2022 (aged 99); Woodland Hills, California, U.S.
- Occupations: Film, stage and television actor

Donald Elson (March 31, 1923 – May 7, 2022) was an American film, stage and television actor.

== Life and career ==
Elson was born in Chicago, Illinois, the son of Abraham and Bertha Elson. He began his acting career in 1952, appearing in the Broadway play Desire Under the Elms. He appeared in such other plays as Inherit the Wind, and Threepenny Opera and The Silver Whistle.

Later in his career, Elson guest-starred in television programs including The Red Skelton Show, Bonanza, Tales of Wells Fargo, Lawman, The Big Valley, Death Valley Days, Sugarfoot and The Rifleman. He also appeared in films such as Julius Caesar, Inherit the Wind, Day of the Outlaw, Gremlins, The Cincinnati Kid, The Affairs of Dobie Gillis and Chaplin.

Elson retired from acting in 2008, last appearing in the Fox police procedural drama television series Bones.

== Death ==
Elson died on May 7, 2022, in Woodland Hills, California, at the age of 99.
