= Ralph Moody (actor) =

American actor (1886–1971)

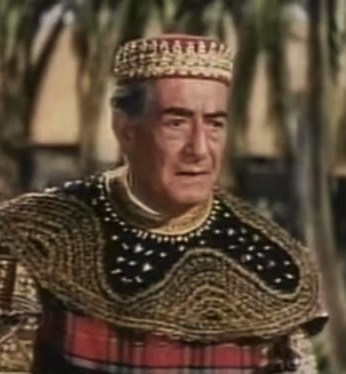
- Moody in Road to Bali
- Born: November 5, 1886; St. Louis, Missouri
- Died: September 6, 1971 (aged 84); Burbank, California
- Occupation: Actor
- Years active: 1948–1971

Ralph Moody (November 5, 1886 – September 6, 1971 ) was an American actor with over 50 movie and over 100 television appearances, plus numerous radio appearances.

Moody spent more than four decades working in stock theater throughout the United States, including having his own troupe for almost half of that span.

In 1939, he began working in radio at WIBW in Topeka, Kansas. Later, he became an announcer and actor at WLW radio in Cincinnati, Ohio. Moody was a regular supporting actor, in various roles, on radio broadcasts of Gunsmoke and Dragnet, and also performed on the Roy Rogers Show and Wild Bill Hickok. He portrayed Gramps on The Trouble with the Truitts on NBC Radio.

At the age of 62, Moody began a string of film and television appearances, including films such as Road to Bali, Toward the Unknown, The Legend of Tom Dooley, and The Story of Ruth.

On television, he played Jay Burrage in The Rifleman. He was also seen in episodes of Gunsmoke, The Lone Ranger, Circus Boy, Mr. Adams and Eve, Perry Mason, Bonanza, Have Gun – Will Travel as Judge Howell in "The Silver Queen" (1958) and as Elmer Jansen in S3 E23 "The Lady on the Wall" (1960), Rawhide, Daniel Boone, Wanted: Dead or Alive, Wagon Train, Rescue 8, and The Adventures of Rin-Tin-Tin. He was also among a rotation of actors used by Jack Webb in the 1950s version, as well as the 1967–70 revival of Dragnet, and in 1970 appeared in the last Dragnet episode produced by Webb. His most frequent television roles were as a kindly old man or Native American.

== Filmography ==
Year	Title	Role	Notes
1948	Tex Granger	Wilkins	Uncredited
1948	Man-Eater of Kumaon	Villager	
1949	Square Dance Jubilee	Indian Chief	
1950	Rock Island Trail	Keokuk	Uncredited
1950	The Gunfighter	Old Man	Uncredited
1950	Bright Leaf	Blacksmith	Uncredited voice
1951	Ace in the Hole	Kusac – Miner	Uncredited
1951	Strangers on a Train	Seedy Man at Carnival	Uncredited
1951	Red Mountain	George Meredyth, Undertaker	
1952	Talk About a Stranger	Shaw, Hardware Storekeeper	Uncredited
1952	Carrie	Vagrant	Uncredited
1952	Wagons West	Kaw Chief	Uncredited
1952	The Story of Will Rogers	Dr. Busheyhead	Uncredited
1952	Affair in Trinidad	Coroner	
1952	The Miracle of Our Lady of Fatima	Villager / Peddler	Uncredited
1952	My Man and I	Rogers	Uncredited
1952	Road to Bali	Bhoma Da	
1953	Seminole	Kulak	
1953	Salome	Old Scholar	Uncredited
1953	The Juggler	Mukhtar	Scenes deleted
1953	Column South	Joe Copper Face	
1953	Pickup on South Street	Coffin Boat Captain	Uncredited
1953	Tumbleweed	Aguila	
1954	The Rocket Man	Mr. Farrow	Uncredited
1954	Day of Triumph	Pharisee	Uncredited
1955	Many Rivers to Cross	Sandak	
1955	Rage at Dawn	Noah Euall	Uncredited
1955	Strange Lady in Town	General Lew Wallace	Uncredited
1955	The Far Horizons	Le Borgne	
1955	I Died a Thousand Times	Pa Goodhue	
1956	Alfred Hitchcock Presents	Local Citizen	Season 1 Episode 33: "The Belfry"
1956	The Steel Jungle	Andy Griffith	
1956	The Last Hunt	Indian Agent	
1956	Toward the Unknown	H. G. Gilbert	
1956	Reprisal!	Matara	Played an Indian as the Grandfather to Halfbreed Frank Madden Guy Madison
1957	The Monster That Challenged the World	Watchman at Lock 57	Uncredited
1957	Pawnee	Chief Wise Eagle	
1957	Perry Mason	George Ballard	The Sun Bather's Diary
1958	Going Steady	Justice of the Peace	
1958	Cry Terror!	Kelly's Dentist	Uncredited
1958	The Lone Ranger and the Lost City of Gold	Padre Vincente Esteban	
1959	Perry Mason	Dennison	Case of the Calendar Girl
1959	The Legend of Tom Dooley	Doc Henry	
1959	The Big Fisherman	Aged Pharisee	
1960	The Story of Ruth	Cleshed	Uncredited
1961	Posse from Hell	Henry	Uncredited
1961	Homicidal	First Hotel Clerk	Uncredited
1961	The Outsider	Uncle	
1962	Gunsmoke	Kip Marston	"Old Comrade" S8E16
1962	Kid Galahad	Peter J. Prohosko	Uncredited
1963	Perry Mason	Mr. Morgan	The Case of the Bouncing Boomerang
1965	The Rounders	Horse Doctor	Uncredited
1966	Gunsmoke	Joseph-Walks-In-Darkness	"Honor Before Justice" S11E24
1966	The Chase	Townsman	Uncredited
