= John Milford =

American film and television actor (1927–2000)

- Born: September 7, 1927; Johnstown, New York, U.S.
- Died: August 14, 2000 (aged 72); Santa Monica, California, U.S.
- Education: Union College
- Years active: 1955 - 2000

John Milford (September 7, 1927 – August 14, 2000) was an American actor in theater, television, and films, playing scores of roles, often as a Western villain. He was estimated to have had about 500 appearances in TV roles.

== Early years ==
Born in Johnstown, New York, Milford studied civil engineering at Union College but chose to pursue his first love, acting. He "worked for some years with Los Angeles' Bureau of Engineering, Department of Public Works."

== Career ==
Milford first appeared on television in the 1940s on What's My Name? on KGRB in Albany, New York.

After making his film debut in Marty in 1955, Milford went on to act in dozens of film and TV roles, especially in Westerns such as Gunsmoke, Bonanza, The Fugitive, The Big Valley, The Rifleman (S3 E4, S5 E7), and The Virginian. In 1959 he appeared on Wagon Train S2 E36, "The Rodney Lawrence Story" as Pete Galt, who tries to rob the wagon train, with Theodore Marcuse in the role of Keller.

From 1959 to 1960, Milford was cast in ten episodes as the historical figure Ike Clanton on the ABC/Desilu series, The Life and Legend of Wyatt Earp, starring Hugh O'Brian as Wyatt Earp. Milford's last episode was S5 E41 "Wyatt's Bitterest Enemy" which aired 6/7/1960.

From 1959 to 1968, Milford appeared in three episodes of Bonanza: on "Vendetta" as Ned Morgan, "Half a Rogue" as Cal Stacy and "A World Full of Cannibals" as Rodgers.

Milford guest-starred in four episodes of Mannix from 1969 to 1974: on "Deathrun" as Sheriff George Hale, "Portrait of a Hero" as Col. Edgar Ewing, "Cry Danger" as Stan Forrester and "The Survivor Who Wasn't" as Harry.

In 1965, Milford had a recurring role as Cole Younger in the ABC series The Legend of Jesse James, starring Christopher Jones. In the same year, Milford appeared in the third-season episode "Billy the Kid" as Sergeant Stoner on the World War II drama Combat!, as well as in an episode of Gunsmoke titled “Winner Take All” (S10E22).

Throughout his career Milford continued to work in the theater. He founded the Chamber Theater at 3759 Cahuenga Blvd, pioneering Equity Waiver productions in Los Angeles, and helped launch the careers of actors such as Richard Chamberlain and Vic Morrow.

Milford's Los Angeles Times obituary credits him with using his engineering background to help create the original design for the Hollywood Walk of Fame.

Milford played the part of Albert Einstein in the 1996 video game Command & Conquer: Red Alert.

== Death ==
Milford died of skin cancer in 2000.

== Filmography ==
Year	Title	Role	Notes
1955	Marty	Minor Role	Uncredited
1956	The Ten Commandments	Attendant to Trojan Ambassador / Young Father	Uncredited
1957	The Persuader	Clint	
1958	The Heart Is a Rebel	Hal Foster	
1959	Face of a Fugitive	Haley	Uncredited
1963	Gunfight at Comanche Creek	Bill Peters	
1965	Zebra in the Kitchen	Sgt. Freebee	
1966	Perry Mason	Clayton Douglas	S9:E15, "The Case of the Bogus Buccaneers"
1966	For Pete's Sake!	Leo	
1967	The Last Challenge	Turpin	
1969	Support Your Local Sheriff!	Gunman McCullough Throws Rocks At	Uncredited
1979	Joni	Dr. Sherrill	
1981	Spider-Man: The Dragon's Challenge	Professor Dent	
1986	Say Yes	Sailor	
1987	Student Confidential	Mr. Warshetsky	
1998	Primary Colors		Uncredited
1998	Show & Tell	Mr. Mahler	
