= Joe Higgins (actor) =

American actor (1925–1998)

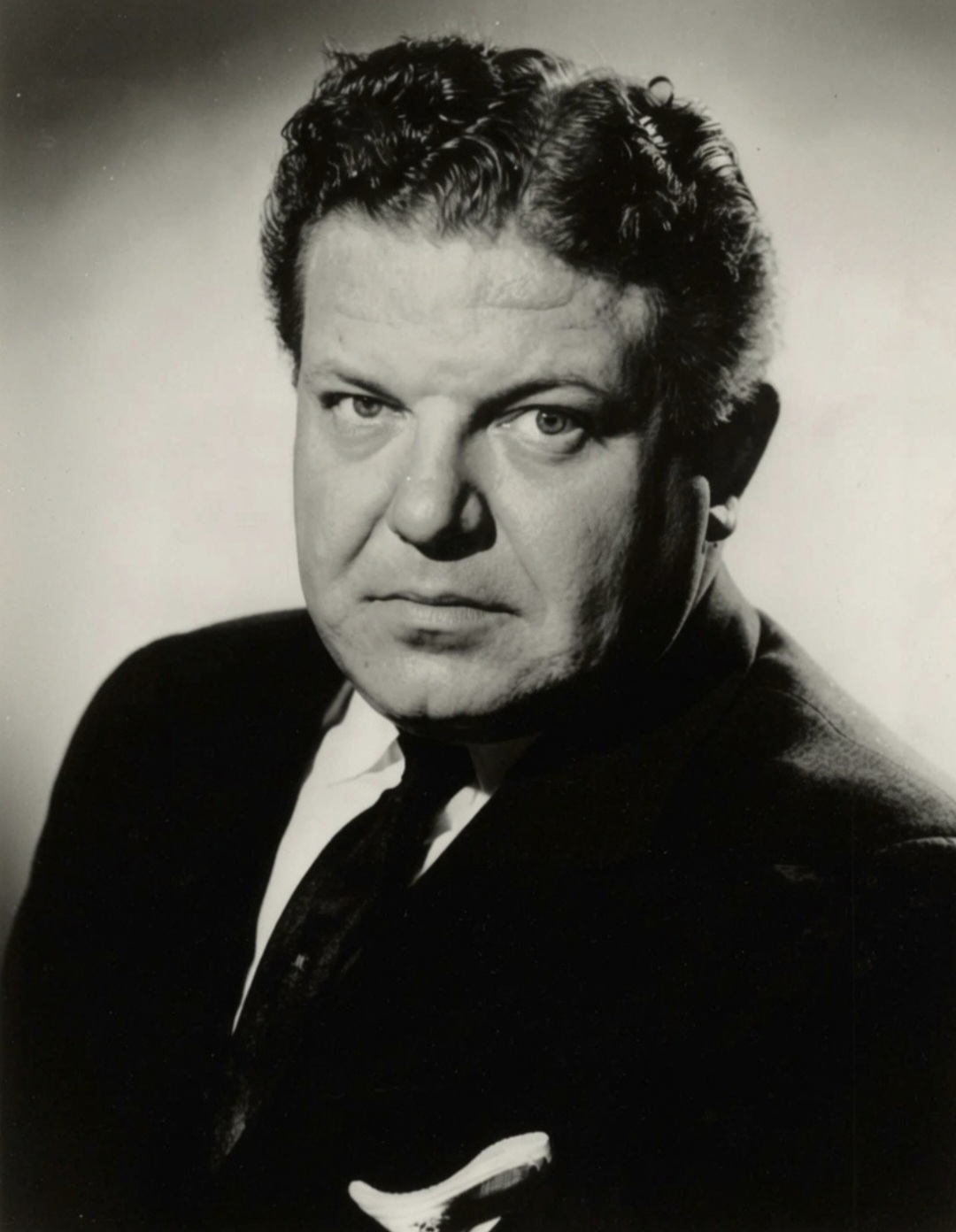
- Higgins in Arrest and Trial, 1963
- Born: Joseph H. Higgins; July 12, 1925; Logansport, Indiana, U.S.
- Died: June 15, 1998 (aged 72); Los Angeles, California, U.S.
- Education: University of Dayton; Embry–Riddle Aeronautical University
- Occupation: Actor
- Years active: 1930s–1987
- Spouse: Jackie Higgins
- Children: 3

Joseph H. Higgins (July 12, 1925 – June 15, 1998) was an American actor. He was known for playing the role of Jake Shakespeare in the American legal drama television series Arrest and Trial and for playing the recurring role of Nils Swenson in The Rifleman.

== Life and career ==
Higgins was born in Logansport, Indiana, where he started acting at the age of nine. He later moved to Dayton, Ohio, attending the University of Dayton and appearing on radio. He later earned a Doctor of Philosophy degree at the Embry–Riddle Aeronautical University.

Higgins began his screen career in 1960, playing the recurring role of blacksmith Nils Swenson in the western television series The Rifleman. Higgins guest-starred in television programs including Gunsmoke, The Guns of Will Sonnett, Bonanza, That Girl, Petticoat Junction, The Monkees (1967) – as Max in S1:E21, "The Prince and the Paupers", The Big Valley, Green Acres, Hill Street Blues, The Fall Guy, Death Valley Days, The Detectives, I Dream of Jeannie and The Twilight Zone. He also co-starred and appeared in films including Flipper (and its sequel Flipper's New Adventure), The Perils of Pauline, Sixpack Annie, Namu, the Killer Whale and Record City. He co-starred in the legal drama television series Arrest and Trial where he played the role of Jake Shakespeare, and also appeared in Sigmund and the Sea Monsters playing the role of the local sheriff.

From 1969 to 1975 Higgins appeared on Chrysler Corporation's Dodge Division television commercials as a sheriff, winning a Clio Award for his performances. As a result of being seen in the commercials Higgins was chosen to play the sheriff on the NBC television pilot of Cat Ballou. In 1976 Higgins was hired as a spokesman for the General Electric Company. He was later asked by Chief of the Kansas City Police Department and second director of the Federal Bureau of Investigation, Clarence M. Kelley, to join a crime prevention task force.

== Death ==
Higgins died in June 1998 of a heart attack in Los Angeles, California, at the age of 72.

== Television ==
Year	Title	Role	Notes
1966	The Monkees	Guard	S1:E10, "The Monkees"
