= The Rifleman =

American Western television series (1958–1963)

- DVD case for The Rifleman, 1958
- Genre: Western
- Created by: Sam Peckinpah (uncredited), Arnold Laven
- Starring: Chuck Connors; Johnny Crawford; Paul Fix
- Composer: Herschel Burke Gilbert
- Country of origin: United States
- Original language: English
- No. of seasons: 5
- No. of episodes: 168 (list of episodes)

Production
- Producer: Levy-Gardner-Laven
- Running time: 25 minutes
- Production company: Four Star Productions

Original release
- Network: ABC
- Release: September 30, 1958 – April 8, 1963

Related
- Law of the Plainsman

The Rifleman is an American Western television series starring Chuck Connors as rancher Lucas McCain and Johnny Crawford as his son Mark McCain. It was set in the 1880s in the fictional town of North Fork, New Mexico Territory. The show was filmed in black and white, in half-hour episodes. The Rifleman aired on ABC from September 30, 1958, to April 8, 1963, as a production of Four Star Television. It was one of the first primetime series on American television to show a single parent raising a child.

The program was titled to reflect McCain's use of a Winchester Model 1892 rifle (an anachronism, as the show was set in the 1880s) which had been customized to allow repeated firing by cycling its lever action. He demonstrated this technique in the opening credits, as well as a second modification that allowed him to cycle the action with one hand using a technique known as "spin-cocking".

== Overview ==
Lucas McCain is a Union Army veteran of the American Civil War and widower. He was a lieutenant in the 11th Indiana Infantry Regiment and received a battlefield commission at the Battle of Five Forks just before the end of the war. (This conflicts with episode 3/25, "The Prisoner", in which a former Confederate cavalry major states that he was Lieutenant McCain's prisoner after the Battle of Fort Donelson.) Having previously been a homesteader, McCain buys a ranch "about three miles" outside the fictitious town of North Fork, New Mexico Territory, in the pilot episode. He and his son Mark had come from Enid, Oklahoma, following the death of his wife, Margaret (née Gibbs), when his son was six years old.

The series was set during the 1880s; a wooden plaque next to the McCain home states that the home was rebuilt by Lucas McCain and his son Mark in August 1881. This conflicts with dates given during the first season episode "The Bank Guard" where Lucas speaks of losing his savings "about 10 years ago" during "the slump of '78".

A common thread in the series is that people deserve a second chance; Marshal Micah Torrance is a recovering alcoholic, and McCain gives Torrance a job on his ranch in "The Marshal". Royal Dano appeared in "The Sheridan Story" as a former Confederate soldier who is given a job on the McCain ranch and encounters General William Sheridan, the man who cost him his arm in battle. Learning why the man wants him dead, Sheridan arranges for medical care for his wounded former foe, quoting President Abraham Lincoln's last orders to "... bind up the nation's wounds". (Note: Sheridan is quoting Lincoln's Second Inaugural Address, specifically the final paragraph: "With malice toward none, with charity for all, with firmness in the right as God gives us to see the right, let us strive on to finish the work we are in, to bind up the nation's wounds, to care for him who shall have borne the battle and for his widow and his orphan, to do all which may achieve and cherish a just and lasting peace among ourselves and with all nations.")

Despite his status as the series' protagonist, Lucas McCain is not without fault; he has a tendency to be stubborn and bossy, he has a bit of an inflated ego, and he is at times over-protective of his son Mark. In "Death Trap", an episode with Philip Carey as former gunman (and old adversary) Simon Battles, he is unwilling to believe the man has changed and become a doctor. It takes a gunfight (with Battles fighting alongside him) to make him admit he is wrong. In "Two Ounces of Tin", with Sammy Davis Jr. as Tip Corey (a former circus trick-shot artist turned gunman), McCain angrily orders him off the ranch when he finds him demonstrating his skills to Mark. Corey suggests he is a hypocrite, because McCain has an equally deadly reputation in the Indian Territory of Oklahoma, where he first acquired the nickname the Rifleman.

== Cast ==
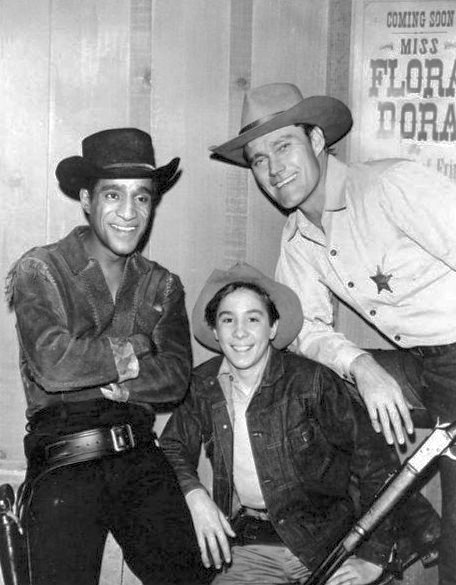
Sammy Davis Jr., Johnny Crawford, and Chuck Connors in 1962

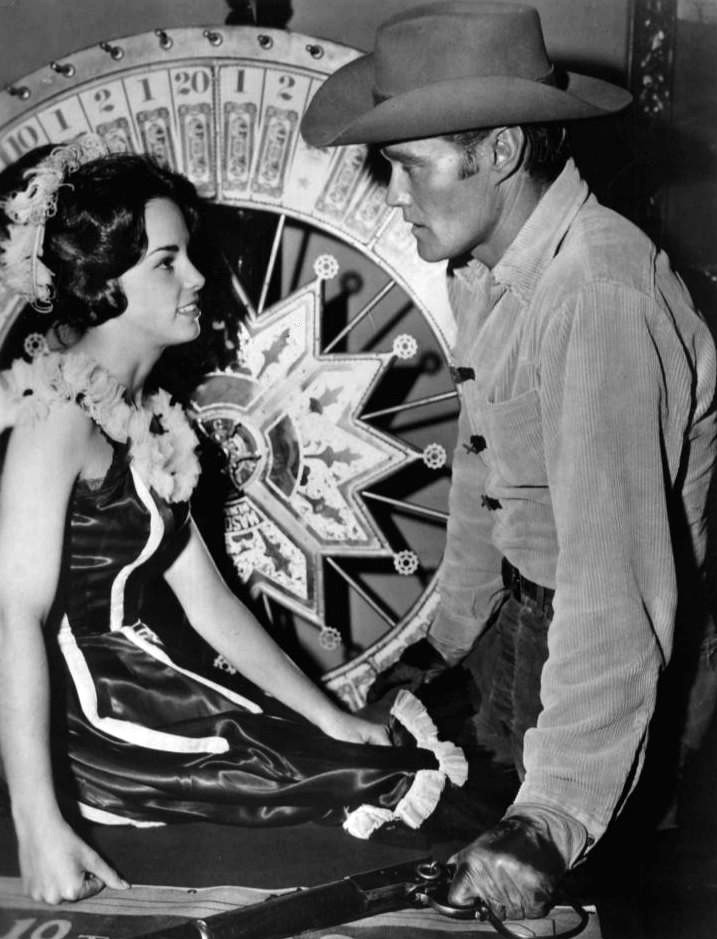
Beverly Englander and Chuck Connors in the 1961 episode "Lariat"

=== Main ===
- Chuck Connors as Lucas McCain, a rancher, a Union Army veteran of the American Civil War, father, and widower
- Johnny Crawford as Mark McCain, Lucas's son
- Paul Fix as Micah Torrance, marshal of North Fork, New Mexico

=== Recurring ===
- Bill Quinn as Frank Sweeney, the North Fork Saloon bartender (38 episodes)
- Patricia Blair as Mallory House hotel owner Lou Mallory (22 episodes)
- Joe Higgins as blacksmith Nels Swenson (21 episodes)
- Harlan Warde as banker John Hamilton (18 episodes)
- Joan Taylor as general store owner Milly Scott (18 episodes)
- Hope Summers as general store owner Hattie Denton (16 episodes)
- John Harmon as hotel clerk Eddie Halstead (12 episodes)
- Chris Alcaide as a regular bad guy (10 episodes)

Eight actors played the town doctor during the series (usually known as "Doc Burrage"): Paul Fix (first episode only; he returned to the cast as Micah), Edgar Buchanan, Fay Roope, Rhys Williams, Jack Kruschen, Robert Burton, Ralph Moody and Bert Stevens. In addition to Joe Higgins, several actors also played blacksmith Nels (sometimes credited as Nils) Swenson, including Richard Alexander, John Dierkes, Henry Rowland and Karl Swenson.

=== Guest stars ===
More than 500 actors made guest appearances in more than 970 credited roles during the five-year run of the series. Guest stars included veteran actors John Anderson, Richard Anderson, Lyle Bettger, Whit Bissell, Harry Carey Jr., John Carradine, Lon Chaney Jr., Ellen Corby, Royal Dano, John Dehner, Jack Elam, Med Flory, Dabbs Greer, Rodolfo Hoyos Jr., Richard Kiel, John Milford, Agnes Moorehead, Denver Pyle, Lee Van Cleef, and Adam West, most appearing multiple times in different roles. Several then-newcomers appeared in the series, including Claude Akins, Dan Blocker, James Coburn, Mark Goddard, James Drury, Dennis Hopper, L. Q. Jones, Michael Landon, Warren Oates, Marian Seldes, Harry Dean Stanton, and Robert Vaughn. Other notable guest stars and character actors who made cameo appearances were Sammy Davis Jr., future baseball Hall of Famers Duke Snider and Don Drysdale, comedian Buddy Hackett, Pernell Roberts (who was on Bonanza at the time), Bobby Crawford Jr. (elder brother of series star Johnny Crawford; himself a star on Laramie from 1959 to 1960), and writer/director/producer Paul Mazursky.

- John Abbott
- Julie Adams
- Stanley Adams
- Claude Akins (three times)
- Norman Alden
- Chris Alcaide (ten times)
- Ed Ames
- James Anderson
- John Anderson (eleven times)
- Richard Anderson (six times)
- Keith Andes
- Michael Ansara (twice)
- R. G. Armstrong (twice as the first sheriff)
- Phyllis Avery ("The Baby Sitter")
- Parley Baer (twice)
- Raymond Bailey
- James Best
- Lyle Bettger (twice)
- Edward Binns
- Whit Bissell (four times)
- Sidney Blackmer (three times)
- Dan Blocker
- Edgar Buchanan (six times)
- Robert Burton (twice)
- Harry Carey Jr. (twice)
- Philip Carey
- Paul Carr (four times)
- John Carradine (twice)
- Conlan Carter (twice)
- Lonny Chapman (twice)
- Lon Chaney Jr.
- Virginia Christine (twice)
- Lee Van Cleef (four times)
- James Coburn (twice)
- Ben Cooper
- Ellen Corby (twice)
- Dennis Cross (six times)
- Robert Culp (twice, wrote a two part episode)
- Abby Dalton
- Royal Dano (five times)
- Cesare Danova (three times)
- Sammy Davis Jr. (twice)
- John Dehner (four times)
- Frank Dekova (twice)
- Richard Devon (seven times)
- Lawrence Dobkin (four times, directed four times, wrote one episode, co-wrote one episode)
- James Drury (twice)
- Jack Elam (five times)
- Leif Erickson
- William Fawcett (twice)
- James Franciscus
- Dean Fredericks (twice)
- Bert Freed (twice)
- Robert Foulk (five times)
- Michael Fox (four times)
- Kathy Garver
- Leo Gordon (twice)
- Don Grady (twice)
- Dabbs Greer (eight times)
- Buddy Hackett (twice)
- Ron Hagerthy (Ben Haskell in 1960 episode, "The Deserter")
- Ron Hayes ("Six Years and a Day")
- Skip Homeier
- Dennis Hopper (twice, including the series premier episode)
- Arthur Hunnicutt
- Katy Jurado
- Enid Jaynes (four times)
- Chubby Johnson (three times)
- I. Stanford Jolley
- L.Q. Jones
- Douglas Kennedy
- Richard Kiel
- Robert Knapp
- Jack Kruschen (four times)
- Michael Landon in two episodes, "End of a Young Gun" and "The Mind Reader"
- Martin Landau
- Marc Lawrence (twice)
- George Lindsey
- Dayton Lummis (twice)
- George Macready (twice)
- Paul Mantee (twice)
- Kevin McCarthy (twice)
- Patrick McVey (twice)
- John Milford (eleven times)
- Denny Miller
- Mort Mills (twice)
- Ralph Moody (six times)
- Agnes Moorehead
- Vic Morrow (twice)
- Ed Nelson (three times)
- Warren Oates(five times)
- Michael Pate (five times)
- Gigi Perreau (twice)
- John M. Pickard
- William Prince
- Denver Pyle (five times)
- Darryl Richard
- Herbert Rudley (twice)
- Bing Russell (twice)
- William Schallert (three times)
- Vito Scotti (three times)
- Dan Sheridan
- Thomas (Tom) Snyder
- Harry Dean Stanton
- K. T. Stevens (five times)
- Harold J. Stone (three times)
- Leonard Stone (twice)
- Glenn Strange (six times)
- Akim Tamiroff
- Robert Vaughn
- Adam West
- Gregory Walcott (twice)
- Robert Webber
- James Westerfield (twice)
- Grace Lee Whitney
- Peter Whitney (nine times)
- Robert J. Wilke (twice)
- Adam Williams (six times, co-wrote one episode)
- Rhys Williams (six times)
- Jeff York

== Episodes ==
Season	Episodes	Originally released	
Season	Episodes	First released	Last released
1	40	September 30, 1958	June 30, 1959
2	36	September 29, 1959	May 31, 1960
3	34	September 27, 1960	May 16, 1961
4	32	October 2, 1961	May 7, 1962
5	26	October 1, 1962	April 8, 1963

== Production ==
The Rifleman was partially filmed in Wildwood Regional Park in Thousand Oaks, California.

=== Development ===
The series was created by Arnold Laven and developed by Sam Peckinpah, who became a director of Western movies. Peckinpah, who wrote and directed many early episodes, based many characters and plots on his own childhood on a ranch. His insistence on violent realism and complex characterizations, as well as his refusal to sugarcoat the lessons he felt the Rifleman's son needed to learn about life, put him at odds with the show's producers at Four Star. Peckinpah left the show and created a short-lived series, The Westerner.

=== Opening credits ===
The opening credit sequence of each episode depicted McCain walking down the street of a town while rapid-firing his Winchester 44-40 1892 model rifle that had been modified at the trigger and lever. The rifle's modification allowed McCain to fire the rifle only by hand pumping the lever, which had a setscrew imbedded in it to trip the weapon's trigger. At various points during the series, episodes would show McCain deftly handling and shooting the rifle ambidextrously. When Connors auditioned for the show, the director suddenly threw a rifle at him; the former Major League Baseball player caught it and got the job.

=== Rifle ===
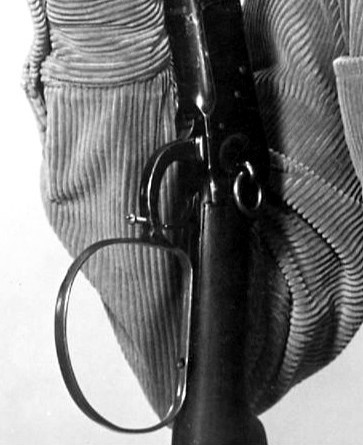
Large lever firing loop on the Rifleman's rifle

Westerns were popular when The Rifleman premiered, and producers tried to find gimmicks to distinguish one show from another. The Rifleman's gimmick was a modified Winchester Model 1892 rifle, with a large ring lever drilled and tapped for a set screw. The lever design allowed him to cock the rifle by spinning it around his hand. In addition, the screw could be positioned to depress the trigger every time he worked the lever, allowing for rapid fire, emptying the magazine in under six seconds during the opening credits on North Fork's main street.

The trigger-trip screw pin was used in two configurations: with the screw head turned inside (close to the trigger), or more often, outside the trigger guard with a locknut on the outside (to secure its position). In some episodes, the screw was removed, when rapid-fire action was not required. When properly adjusted, the screw "squeezed" the trigger when the lever was fully closed. The rapid-fire mechanism was originally designed to keep Connors from puncturing his finger with the trigger as he quickly cycled the action of the rifle. With this modification, Connors pulling the trigger for each shot was not necessary, so he did not have to place his finger in harm's way. A close-up of the rifle's large looped lever and trigger-set screw can be seen in the third-season episode "Miss Bertie."

The rifle may have appeared in every episode, but it was not always fired; some plots did not require violent solutions (for example, one involving Mark's rigid new teacher). McCain attempts to solve as many problems as possible without resorting to shooting, yet still manages to kill 120 villains over the show's five-year run. Notably, McCain almost never carried a pistol, although he is a good shot with it, especially when he improvised a crude gunstock from a board, when facing a villain (played by Vic Morrow) who had stolen his rifle.

The rifle used on the set of The Rifleman, an 1892 Winchester caliber .44-40 carbine with a standard 20-inch barrel, was an historical anachronism, as the show was set in 1881, 12 years before John Browning had designed the rifle. It appeared with two different types of levers. The backwards, round-D-style loop was used in the early episodes. Sometimes, the rifle McCain uses has a saddle ring. The lever style later changed to a flatter lever (instead of the large loop) with no saddle ring.

McCain fires 12 shots from his rifle during the opening credits: seven shots in the first close-up and five more as the camera switches to another view. The blank cartridges are shorter than standard cartridges, so the magazine can hold more of the blanks. The soundtrack contained a dubbed 13th shot to allow the firing to end with a section of the theme music. The rifle was chambered for the .44-40 Winchester center fire cartridge, which was used in both revolvers and rifles. He could supposedly fire off his first round in three-tenths of a second, which certainly helped in a showdown.

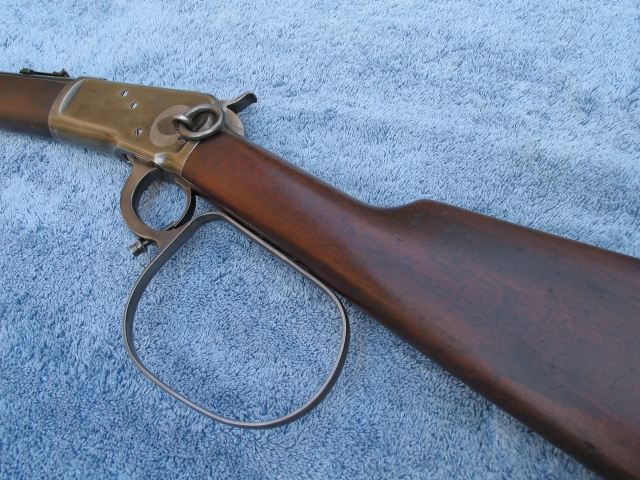
Rifle replica

Gunsmith James S. Stembridge modified two Model 1892s for use in regular and close-up filming. In addition, a Spanish-made Gárate y Anitúa "El Tigre" lever action, a near-copy of the Model 1892, was modified for use as a knockabout gun. The El Tigre is seen in scenes where the rifle is in a saddle scabbard and is not drawn, and in stunts where the rifle was thrown to the ground, used as a club, or in any stunt where a possibility of damage to the original Winchester 1892s existed. These three rifles were the only ones used by Connors during the run of the series.

The now-defunct Stembridge Gun Rentals provided the rifles and ammunition. Ammunition was quarter-load 5-in-1 blank cartridges containing smokeless powder, which did not produce the thick clouds of smoke the genuine black powder cartridges of the 1880s did. Most (if not all) of the sound effects for the rifle shots were dubbed, which is why the rifle sounded so different from the other gunshots on the show.

The 1892 Winchester is a top-eject rifle (opening the action by pushing the finger-lever forward moves the bolt rearward and thereby opens the top of the receiver). Loaded rounds or empty cases from the chamber eject straight up when the lever is pushed fully open (forward). When Connors cycled the action by spinning the rifle to his side, the cartridge in the action could fall out. Therefore, the rifle was modified with a plunger, which would hold the round in place.

The Winchester Model 1892 rifle was designed by John Moses Browning, and other than general appearance, it has nothing in common with earlier lever-action rifles using the same class of cartridges. The significant improvement was the addition of vertical lugs that securely lock the bolt and receiver when the gun fires. Winchester originally produced this gun from 1892 to 1941; total production was slightly over 1,000,000; 27 variations in five chamberings were made over the course of production, but the basic design was largely unaltered. As with the earlier Model 1873, the light and handy Model 1892 was chambered for handgun cartridges, favored by many Westerners to simplify ammunition supply problems by using the same cartridge in both a handgun and a rifle. The Model 1892 was replaced by the Browning-designed Model 1894, which also had an impressive manufacturing history, with over 7,000,000 produced; it is still being produced to this day by a successor to Winchester. The Model 94's popularity and long production history may be related to its being the first Winchester to be designed for the then-new "smokeless" powder.

=== Directing and writing ===
The pilot episode, "The Sharpshooter", was originally telecast on CBS as part of Dick Powell's Zane Grey Theatre on March 7, 1958; it was repeated (in edited form) as the first episode of the series on ABC. The episode was written by Sam Peckinpah, and guest starred Dennis Hopper.

Regulars on the program included Marshal Micah Torrance (R. G. Armstrong was the original marshal for two episodes, the first and the fourth), Sweeney the bartender (Bill Quinn), and a half-dozen other residents of North Fork (played by Hope Summers, Joan Taylor, Patricia Blair, John Harmon, and Harlan Warde).

Fifty-one episodes of the series were directed by Joseph H. Lewis (director of 1950's Gun Crazy and known for his film noir style). Ida Lupino directed one episode, "The Assault".

Connors wrote several episodes. Robert Culp (star of CBS's Trackdown, another Four Star production), wrote one two-part episode, and Frank D. Gilroy (creator of ABC's Burke's Law, another Four Star production), wrote "End of a Young Gun".

== Release ==
=== Home media ===
MPI Home Video has released The Rifleman on DVD in Region 1 in a number of versions. It has released single-disc DVDs with five episodes; from 2002 to 2006 it released six sets, each with 20 episodes. The releases are random collections of episodes, rather than the original broadcast order. These releases are out of print, since MPI Home Video no longer owns the rights to the series. Levy-Gardner-Laven Productions, the original producer, is again the sole copyright owner of The Rifleman series.

In late 2013, Levy-Gardner-Laven Productions, Inc. announced it would be the only authorized outlet to offer for the first time all 168 episodes of The Rifleman, the original series, newly restored and assembled in DVD box sets. The episodes were to be released in sequential order, by season, in high-quality boxed sets with exclusive special features. The first boxed set of all Season 1 episodes was made available on December 4, 2013, for $69.95. The second season was released on November 28, 2014. Season 3 was released on December 2, 2015. Season 4 was released on December 4, 2016. Season 5 was released on November 27, 2017.

DVD name	Ep #	Release date
The Complete First Season	40	December 4, 2013
The Complete Second Season	36	November 28, 2014
The Complete Third Season	34	December 2, 2015
The Complete Fourth Season	32	December 4, 2016
The Complete Fifth Season	26	November 27, 2017

== Reception ==
=== U.S. Nielsen ratings ===
Season	Episodes	Originally aired		Rank	Rating
Season	Episodes	Season premiere	Season finale	Rank	Rating
1	40	September 30, 1958	June 30, 1959	4	33.1
2	36	September 29, 1959	May 31, 1960	13	27.5
3	34	September 27, 1960	May 16, 1961	27	22.1
4	32	October 2, 1961	May 7, 1962	28	22.3
5	26	October 1, 1962	April 8, 1963	Not in the Top 30	

== Spin-offs and remakes ==
=== Law of the Plainsman (1959) ===
The February 17, 1959 episode of The Rifleman was a pilot for an NBC series, Law of the Plainsman, starring Michael Ansara as Marshal Sam Buckhart. In the episode "The Indian", Buckhart comes to North Fork to look for Indians suspected of murdering a Texas Ranger and his family. He subsequently reappeared in "The Raid". Three episodes of "The Rifleman" served as pilots for Westerns that never became a series. These were: "The Lariat" (March 29, 1960) starring Richard Anderson as a gambler and sharpshooter; "Death Trap" (May 9, 1961) featuring Phil Carey as Simon Battle, a gunslinger turned doctor; and "Which Way'd They Go?" (April 1, 1963), a comedy-western with Peter Whitney.

=== The Gambler Returns (1991) ===
Chuck Connors briefly played the same character in the TV movie The Gambler Returns: The Luck of the Draw (1991), which features a number of 1950s and 1960s television Western series leads reprising their roles in quick cameo appearances:

- Gene Barry as Bat Masterson
- Hugh O'Brian as Wyatt Earp
- Jack Kelly as Bart Maverick
- Clint Walker as Cheyenne Bodie
- Brian Keith as The Westerner
- David Carradine as Caine of Kung Fu

=== 2011 attempted remake ===
In late 2011, CBS announced plans to remake the original Rifleman series. Chris Columbus was slated to be the executive producer and direct, with Robert Levy, Steven Gardner, and Arthur Gardner (related to original producers Levy-Gardner-Laven) as executive producers. The remake project was canceled a few months later, without a pilot episode being made.

== Merchandising ==
The TV show was also adapted into a comic book by Dan Spiegle, distributed by Dell Comics.

American toymaker Hubley produced a well made toy copy of McCain's Model 1892 known variously as The Rifleman Rifle, the Flip Special, and the Ring Rifle. Marx Toys also marketed a version called the Wild West that was simply the Lone Ranger/Roy Rogers Winchester with the loop lever used by McCain replacing the standard straight lever.

== See also ==
- Bonanza
- Gunsmoke
- Maverick
- The Virginian
- Wagon Train
