= Joan Taylor =

American actress (1929–2012)

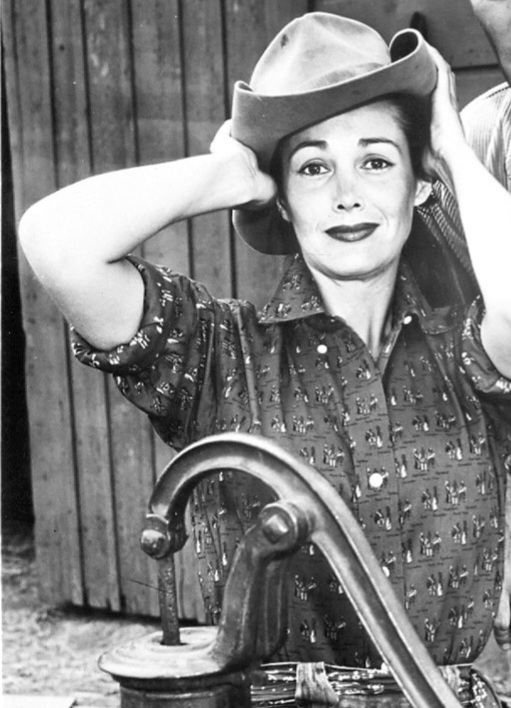
- Taylor in The Rifleman (1960)
- Born: Rose Marie Emma; August 18, 1929; Geneva, Illinois, U.S.
- Died: March 4, 2012 (aged 82); Santa Monica, California, U.S.
- Other name: Rose Freeman
- Occupations: Actress and screenwriter
- Years active: 1949–1989
- Spouses: Leonard Freeman (m. 1953; died 1974) Walter Grauman (m. 1976; div. 1980)
- Children: 3, including Lisa Freeman

Joan Taylor (August 18, 1929 – March 4, 2012) was an American television and film actress.

== Personal life ==
Taylor was born Rose Marie Emma in Geneva, Illinois. Her father, Joseph Emma, from Sicily, was a prop man in Hollywood in the 1920s. After his daughter's birth he became the manager of the Deerpath movie theatre in Lake Forest, Illinois, where Joan was brought up. Her mother, Amelia Berky, was from Austria, and was a vaudeville singing-dancing star in the 1920s.

Taylor married Leonard Freeman, later the creator of Hawaii Five-O, in 1953. The couple had three daughters. After her contract for The Rifleman ran out, she retired from acting to raise her children.

When Freeman died in January 1974, following heart surgery, Taylor began managing Leonard Freeman Productions and the business of Hawaii Five-O under the name Rose Freeman. She attended at least one Hawaii Five-O convention to talk to fans.

With her children older, she found herself writing, including co-author credit for the comedy Fools Rush In starring Matthew Perry and Salma Hayek. She remarried, to television producer-director Walter Grauman in 1976; the couple divorced in 1980.

== Career ==
Taylor's career began at the Pasadena Playhouse. She met Freeman there when both were involved with putting on Here Comes Mr. Jordan. In the early 1950s, she was chosen by Paramount Pictures as a member of the studio's "Golden Circle", described as a "group consisting of a dozen unusually talented young actors for whom Paramount held high hopes." Her first film was Fighting Man of the Plains, starring Randolph Scott. Her producer had also insured the 19-year-old's legs for $100,000 against injury.

She was also known for playing Carol Marvin in the 1956 cult classic film Earth vs. the Flying Saucers.

Her television career consisted of guest appearances on popular shows, in only one or two episodes. However, she had a successful recurring role in eighteen episodes of The Rifleman, starring Chuck Connors from 1960 to 1962.

== Death ==
Taylor died of natural causes March 4, 2012, in Santa Monica, California.

== Selected filmography ==
=== Television ===
- Mike Hammer as Diane Baxter / (2 episodes, 1958)
- Zane Grey Theatre as Rose Bailey (1 episode, 1958)
- Yancy Derringer as Lavinia Lake (1 episode, 1958)
- Peter Gunn as Liz Hatton (1 episode, 1958)
- Wagon Train as Bright Star (1 episode "A Man Called Horse", 1958)
- Gunsmoke as Anna Wheat (1 episode, 1959)
- 21 Beacon Street as Ruth (2 episodes, 1959)
- Men into Space as Carol Gordon (1 episode, 1959)
- The Texan as Rita Maynor (1 episode, 1959)
- The Millionaire as Mary Ann Wilson (1 episode, 1959)
- Colt .45 as Dr. Ellen McGraw (1 episode, 1959)
- Lock-Up as Lauren Bodret (1 episode, 1960)
- The Detectives Starring Robert Taylor as Myrna Fontaine (1 episode, 1961)
- Rawhide (1961) – Paibada in S3:E27, "Incident Before Black Pass"
- My Three Sons as Muriel Stewart (1 episode, 1961)
- Bronco as Lorain (1 episode, 1962)
- The Dick Powell Show (1 episode, 1962)
- The Rifleman as Milly Scott (18 episodes, 1960–1962)
- 77 Sunset Strip as Beth Collins (1 episode, 1963)

=== Feature films ===
- Fighting Man of the Plains (1949) as Evelyn Slocum
- On Dangerous Ground (1952) as Hazel (uncredited)
- The Savage (1952) as Luta
- Off Limits (1953) as Helen
- War Paint (1953) as Wanima
- Rose Marie (1954) as Wanda
- Apache Woman (1955) as Anne LeBeau
- Fort Yuma (1955) as Francesca
- Earth vs. the Flying Saucers (1956) as Carol Marvin
- Girls in Prison (1956) as Anne Carson
- War Drums (1957) as Riva
- 20 Million Miles to Earth (1957) as Marisa Leonardo
- Omar Khayyam (1957) as Yaffa
