= Tom Rolf =

Swedish film editor (1931–2014)

- Born: Ernst Ragnar Rolf; December 31, 1931; Stockholm, Sweden
- Died: July 14, 2014 (aged 82); France
- Occupation: Film editor
- Years active: 1957–2008
- Parent(s): Ernst Rolf and Tutta Rolf

Ernst Ragnar Rolf (December 31, 1931 – July 14, 2014), better known as Tom Rolf, was a Swedish film editor who worked on at least 48 feature films in a career spanning over fifty years. Most notable among these films are Martin Scorsese's Taxi Driver, for which he was nominated for the 1976 BAFTA Award for Best Editing, and Philip Kaufman's The Right Stuff, for which he and his editing team won the 1983 Oscar for Best Film Editing. Other notable films he edited include WarGames, Jacob's Ladder, Heat and The Horse Whisperer.

A member of the American Cinema Editors (ACE) since the mid-1950s, Rolf served two terms as president of that guild. He also served on the Board of Governors at the Academy of Motion Picture Arts and Sciences for five terms (15 years), representing the editing branch from 1992 through 2007. He received the ACE Career Achievement Award in 2003.

== Early life ==
Ernst R. Rolf was born in Stockholm, Sweden on New Year's Eve, 1931, the son of actor Ernst Rolf and Norwegian-born actress Tutta Rolf.

== Career ==
=== Early years, Levy-Gardiner-Laven and first films of the '70s ===
At the start of his career, Rolf spent a then-required eight years serving as an apprentice and assistant editor. One of Rolf's earliest jobs as an editor was the 1959 Swedish-American co-production Invasion of the Animal People. Among the films he worked on as an assistant editor was Levy-Gardner-Laven's 1962 Western Geronimo. Levy-Gardner-Laven later made Rolf one of the head editors of their 1965 Western, The Glory Guys; Rolf's editing partner on this film was Melvin Shapiro, with whom Rolf would work again on Taxi Driver over ten years later.

When Levy-Gardner-Laven began production on the Western television series The Big Valley, they brought in Rolf to serve as one of the editors of the show. He edited nine episodes of the first season, which ran from 1965 to 1966. At the start of the second season, in 1966, he became the show's editorial coordinator, a position he held until the series ended in 1969. In 1967, starting with the third season of The Big Valley, he took on the name "Tom Rolf."

Rolf's first feature film as a solo editor was another Levy-Gardner-Laven production, the 1967 Elvis Presley picture Clambake. Rolf worked on a few more Levy-Gardner-Laven productions, including the 1970 releases Underground (which, like Clambake, was directed by Arthur H. Nadel) and The McKenzie Break. The latter was the first of four films Rolf would edit for director Lamont Johnson; their subsequent collaborations were The Last American Hero (1973), Visit to a Chief's Son (1974) and the 1975 TV movie Fear on Trial. Rolf also edited two 1973 releases for Richard C. Sarafian: Lolly-Madonna XXX and The Man Who Loved Cat Dancing.

=== Mid-to-late 1970s: Scorsese, Schrader and Frankenheimer ===
The turning point in Rolf's career came in 1975 when he and Melvin Shapiro were recruited by director Martin Scorsese to edit his crime drama Taxi Driver. Released in 1976, Taxi Driver was nominated for four Academy Awards, including Best Picture, and has come to be considered one of the greatest films of all time. The film also received three BAFTA Awards and four BAFTA nominations, including one for Rolf, Shapiro, and Marcia Lucas for Best Editing. Scorsese hired Rolf again for his next film, the 1977 musical New York, New York, before Scorsese began working with his regular editor, Thelma Schoonmaker.

Paul Schrader, the writer of Taxi Driver, was so impressed with Rolf that he hired him for his directorial debut, the 1978 drama film Blue Collar, and recruited Rolf again for his second feature, Hardcore. Rolf also edited three films for director John Frankenheimer in the mid-to-late 1970s: French Connection II (1975), Black Sunday (1977) and Prophecy (1979).

=== The 1980s and beyond ===
After co-editing Michael Cimino's infamous box office flop Heaven's Gate, Rolf joined the editing team of Philip Kaufman's space race drama The Right Stuff. The film was a critical (if not commercial) success and picked up four Academy Awards, including Best Editing for Rolf and his fellow editors, Glenn Farr, Lisa Fruchtman, Stephen A. Rotter and Douglas Stewart.

Rolf and the Right Stuff editing team were also nominated for an "Eddie" Award from American Cinema Editors (ACE). Although they did not win the award, Rolf himself won that year for his solo work on John Badham's WarGames. According to editor Mark Goldblatt, Rolf's very first cut of WarGames so satisfied Badham that the director signed off on it immediately with no additional notes for the editor. Badham later recruited Rolf for his 1987 crime-comedy Stakeout, though this time the editor was paired up with Michael Ripps.

For director Adrian Lyne, Rolf edited 1986's 9½ Weeks and 1990's Jacob's Ladder. The latter is considered by some, including author and film scholar Vincent LoBrutto, to be a landmark in film editing due to the intricacies and complexities involved in cutting the picture and because it "furthered the montage style of editing and allowed filmmakers to strive for new forms." In 2010, Rolf told The Hollywood Reporter that Jacob's Ladder was the film he enjoyed working on the most, stating he was "very proud of that one."

Rolf also edited or co-edited two films each for Douglas Day Stewart (Thief of Hearts and Quicksilver) and Alan J. Pakula (The Pelican Brief and The Devil's Own). Additionally, he edited two television productions for Lawrence Schiller: the 1982 movie The Executioner's Song and the 2000 miniseries Perfect Murder, Perfect Town. Other notable films which were edited or co-edited by Rolf include Ridley Scott's Black Rain (1989), Michael Mann's Heat (1995), Robert Redford's The Horse Whisperer (1998), John Woo's Windtalkers and Kurt Wimmer's Equilibrium (both 2002).

In 2003, Rolf re-teamed with Blue Collar and Hardcore director Paul Schrader to work on Dominion: Prequel to the Exorcist. It was released in 2005, though Rolf did not receive on-screen credit. The last film Rolf edited was the Russian Alexander Kolchak biopic Admiral, released in 2008.

== Personal life ==
After his father's death in 1932, Tutta married American director and choreographer Jack Donohue, who advised the young Ernst to go into film editing.

Rolf worked as a ski patrolman and was a seaman for the Norwegian Merchant Marine before emigrating to the United States, after which he spent three years in the United States Marine Corps. He considered pursuing a career as a film director like his step-father, but Donohue convinced him to first try his hand at film editing, telling him he would "learn everything about directing by being a film editor first."

== Death ==
On July 14, 2014, Rolf died at his home in France due to complications following hip surgery. He was 82.

== Selected filmography ==
Editor
Year	Film	Director	Notes
1959	Invasion of the Animal People	Virgil W. Vogel	
1965	The Glory Guys	Arnold Laven	Second collaboration with Arnold Laven
1967	Clambake	Arthur H. Nadel	First collaboration with Arthur H. Nadel
1970	Underground	Arthur H. Nadel	Second collaboration with Arthur H. Nadel
1970	The McKenzie Break	Lamont Johnson	First collaboration with Lamont Johnson
1971	The Hunting Party	Don Medford	
1972	The Honkers	Steve Ihnat	
1973	Lolly-Madonna XXX	Richard C. Sarafian	First collaboration with Richard C. Sarafian
1973	Country Blue	Jack Conrad	
1973	The Man Who Loved Cat Dancing	Richard C. Sarafian	Second collaboration with Richard C. Sarafian
1973	The Last American Hero	Lamont Johnson	Second collaboration with Lamont Johnson
1974	Visit to a Chief's Son	Lamont Johnson	Third collaboration with Lamont Johnson
1974	The Trial of Billy Jack	Tom Laughlin	
1975	French Connection II	John Frankenheimer	First collaboration with John Frankenheimer
1975	Lucky Lady	Stanley Donen	Uncredited
1976	Taxi Driver	Martin Scorsese	First collaboration with Martin Scorsese
1977	Black Sunday	John Frankenheimer	Second collaboration with John Frankenheimer
1977	New York, New York	Martin Scorsese	Second collaboration with Martin Scorsese
1978	Blue Collar	Paul Schrader	First collaboration with Paul Schrader
1979	Hardcore	Paul Schrader	Second collaboration with Paul Schrader
1979	Prophecy	John Frankenheimer	Third collaboration with John Frankenheimer
1980	Heaven's Gate	Michael Cimino	
1981	Ghost Story	John Irvin	
1983	WarGames	John Badham	First collaboration with John Badham
1983	The Right Stuff	Philip Kaufman	
1984	Thief of Hearts	Douglas Day Stewart	
1986	9½ Weeks	Adrian Lyne	First collaboration with Adrian Lyne
1986	Quicksilver	Thomas Michael Donnelly	
1987	Outrageous Fortune	Arthur Hiller	
1987	Stakeout	John Badham	Second collaboration with John Badham
1988	The Great Outdoors	Howard Deutch	
1989	Black Rain	Ridley Scott	
1990	Jacob's Ladder	Adrian Lyne	Second collaboration with Adrian Lyne
1992	Sneakers	Phil Alden Robinson	
1993	The Pelican Brief	Alan J. Pakula	First collaboration with Alan J. Pakula
1993	Mr. Jones	Mike Figgis	
1995	Dangerous Minds	John N. Smith	
1995	Heat	Michael Mann	
1997	The Devil's Own	Alan J. Pakula	Second collaboration with Alan J. Pakula
1998	The Horse Whisperer	Robert Redford	
2002	Windtalkers	John Woo	
2002	Equilibrium	Kurt Wimmer	
2007	Crazy	Rick Bieber	
2008	Admiral	Andrei Kravchuk	

Editorial department
Year	Film	Director	Role	Notes
1962	Geronimo	Arnold Laven	Assistant film editor	First collaboration with Arnold Laven
1964	Behold a Pale Horse	Fred Zinnemann	Assistant editor	
1973	The Last American Hero	Lamont Johnson	Supervising editor	
1975	Lucky Lady	Stanley Donen	Editor: Battle sequence	

Producer
Year	Film	Director	Credit
1967	Clambake	Arthur H. Nadel	Associate producer

Writer
Year	Film	Director
1971	The Resurrection of Zachary Wheeler	Bob Wynn

TV movies

Editor
Year	Film	Director
1975	Fear on Trial	Lamont Johnson
1982	The Executioner's Song	Lawrence Schiller
2000	Perfect Murder, Perfect Town	Lawrence Schiller

TV series

Editor
Year	Title	Notes
1965−67	The Big Valley	10 episodes
2000	Perfect Murder, Perfect Town	
2009	Admiral	10 episodes

Additional crew
Year	Title	Role	Notes
1966−69	The Big Valley	Production coordinator	82 episodes
