= The Hunting Party (1971 film) =

1971 film by Don Medford

- Original film poster
- Directed by: Don Medford
- Written by: Gilbert Ralston; William W. Norton; Lou Morheim
- Produced by: Jules V. Levy; Arthur Gardner; Arnold Laven
- Starring: Oliver Reed; Gene Hackman; Candice Bergen; Simon Oakland; Ronald Howard
- Cinematography: Cecilio Paniagua
- Edited by: Tom Rolf
- Music by: Riz Ortolani
- Production company: Levy-Gardner-Laven
- Distributed by: United Artists
- Release date: 16 July 1971
- Running time: 111 minutes
- Countries: United Kingdom; United States
- Language: English
- Budget: $1.6 million

The Hunting Party is a 1971 American-British western film, directed by Don Medford for Levy-Gardner-Laven and starring Oliver Reed, Gene Hackman, Candice Bergen, Simon Oakland and Ronald Howard.

The film was shot at studios in Madrid and on location around Spain, including the Tabernas Desert in Andalusia. The film's sets were designed by the art director Enrique Alarcón.

== Plot ==
Relations are strained between sexually sadistic cattle baron Brandt Ruger and his wife Melissa when he leaves for a two-week hunting trip with some of his wealthy friends.

Mistaking her for a schoolteacher, outlaw Frank Calder and his band of rustlers and thieves kidnap Melissa, not for ransom but because Calder wants to be taught how to read a book.

Traveling by luxurious private train, the hunting party engages in debauchery with women, one of whom Ruger sadistically abuses. While the party dines, Ruger presents them with rifles he describes as the "Sharps-Borchardt Model Creedmoor .54 caliber – finest rifle ever made". He claims it is "accurate up to 800 yards". Notified that his wife has been taken captive, he then tells his friends they will pick off the kidnappers from a distance with their new, long-range rifles. They will hunt not for animals but for men.

Calder twice must keep Melissa from being raped by his men. But eventually, he overpowers and rapes her himself. Melissa tries to shoot and stab Calder and to flee, each time in vain. She goes on a hunger strike, but cannot resist the temptation of a jar of peaches. She begins to enjoy Calder's company.

Using rifles with telescopic sights that can allow shooting a target at 800 yards (732 m), Ruger and his men begin to pick off the outlaws one by one. Melissa also stabs one, Hog Warren, after he attempts a second time to rape her. Calder charges within close range and is able to shoot one of Ruger's men. Two others quit the hunting party when they see Ruger's lack of concern over their friend's death.

Calder's men become upset to discover that they have kidnapped such a powerful man's wife, placing them in danger for no good reason. The men revolt and Calder kills one. When his own best friend, Doc, is gravely wounded, Calder obeys a last request to put Doc out of his misery.

On his death bed, Hog Warren further angers Ruger by telling him Melissa is now Calder's woman. In yet another ambush, Ruger sees for himself that Melissa, rather than trying to escape, leaps onto Calder's horse voluntarily to ride off with him. Ruger's last remaining ally, Matthew, implores him to let her go, but the crazed Ruger pays no mind.

The last of Calder's men are gunned down from long range at a water hole. Alone now, Calder and Melissa are driven out into the desert. Weak from heat and thirst, their horse dead, they stumble toward an inevitable fate. Ruger materializes on foot. He fatally shoots Calder with his rifle. As Calder is dying Ruger kills Melissa. Ruger then collapses beside them. The credits roll over what appears to be a sepia photograph of three bodies in the sand.

== Cast ==
- Oliver Reed as Frank Calder
- Gene Hackman as Brandt Ruger
- Candice Bergen as Melissa Ruger
- Simon Oakland as Matthew Gunn
- L.Q. Jones as "Hog" Warren
- Mitchell Ryan as Doc Harrison
- Ronald Howard as Watt Nelson
- William Watson as Jim Loring
- G.D. Spradlin as Sam Bayard
- Rayford Barnes as Crimp
- Bernard Kay as Buford King
- Richard Adams as "Owney" Clark
- Dean Selmier as Collins
- Sarah Atkinson as redhead
- Francesca Tu as Chinese Girl
- Marian Collier as Teacher
- Ralph Browne as Sheriff
- Carlos Bravo as Cowboy
- Rafael Albaicín as Mexican
- Román Ariznavarreta as Outlaw Hunter
- Eugenio García as Mario
- Christine Larroude in a bit part
- Stephanie Pieritz in a bit part
- Emilio Rodríguez as Priest
- Max Slaten as Telegrapher
- Lilibeth Solison as Blonde
- Bud Strait as Cowboy
- María Luisa Tovar as Mexican Girl

== Soundtrack ==
The soundtrack was composed by Riz Ortolani. While in Hollywood to score the film, he gave interviews, criticizing the trend of low budget movies to recut existing music.

== Reception ==
The Monthly Film Bulletin wrote:

To judge not only by the publicity pronouncements ("The film shows the men of Texas and the West not as folklore makes them out to be, but as they really were . . ."), but by the self-conscious echoes of the final sequence, The Hunting Party has pretensions to the stark realism and raw passions of Stroheim's Greed. What finally emerges is indicated all too clearly by the first two shots in the film: a knife ripping open the belly of an up-ended steer, and Ruger's hands scrabbling frenetically at his wife's naked body. Everything that follows is equally crude and synthetic, with Oliver Reed, brooding away as the noble savage, invited to outdo even the worst excesses of the Brazilian cinema as he sobs wildly after being forced to shoot his best friend or takes an unconscionable time over lying down for good in his death scene (still wearing, one notes, a Persil-white shirt). When all the histrionics are said and done, with Candice Bergen suffering mightily and Gene Hackman permanently sneering, all one is left with is a handful of striking Spanish locations and a teasing mystery as to how the outraged husband manages to recognise his wife's abductor, whom he has never seen, through a telescope at a range of some eight hundred yards. Since the whole sadistic point of the film – Ruger refuses to shoot Calder until he has suffered enough – hangs thereby, it seems a fair question.

Roger Greenspun wrote in The New York Times that it was "a really stupid movie" in which Bergen had "an utterly thankless role" and that the director "hokes up the action to a degree not required by the story and, with a stunning tactlessness, catches scene after scene at its dramatic limit and pushes it over into helpless banality."

Variety wrote: "seldom has so much fake blood been splattered for so little". Tony Mastroianni wrote in The Cleveland Press that "this movie is no picnic. It is a gory western for audiences with strong stomachs. It also is pretentious. If D.H. Lawrence had written westerns, he might have turned out some of the plot of The Hunting Party."

Leonard Maltin gave it his lowest rating ("BOMB"), writing: "Fine cast is wasted in repellently violent western that adds nothing new".

On the review aggregator website Rotten Tomatoes, 20% of 10 critics' reviews are positive, with an average rating of 3.7/10.
