= Safari 3000 =

1982 film by Harry Hurwitz

- Theatrical release poster
- Directed by: Harry Hurwitz
- Written by: Arthur Gardner; Michael Harreschou; Jules V. Levy
- Produced by: Arthur Gardner
- Starring: David Carradine; Stockard Channing; Christopher Lee
- Cinematography: Adam Greenberg
- Edited by: Samuel E. Beetley
- Music by: Ernest Gold
- Production company: Levy-Gardner-Laven
- Distributed by: MGM/UA Entertainment
- Release date: 1982
- Running time: 91 minutes
- Country: United States
- Language: English

Safari 3000 is a 1982 American action-adventure comedy film directed by Harry Hurwitz and starring David Carradine, Stockard Channing, and Christopher Lee. The film was shot on location in Africa.

== Plot ==
Daredevil stunt driver Eddie Miles has been hired to drive Count Borgia's second car in the "African International Rally;" he immediately gets himself fired by humiliatingly defeating his boss in a test race. Mischief-maker Playboy's writer J.J. Dalton asks her editor to send her to cover the race; she will be the navigator for Freddie Selkirk, her pilot friend. The editor, enticed by the idea of having her many miles away, consents.
On arrival, she finds out Freddie will be unable to run (or do anything else for that matter), so she buys a decrepit car and looks for a pilot, just as Eddie is looking for a car to drive. After he demonstrates his nerve-racking driving capabilities and the poor condition of the car, he suggests J.J. interview Count Borgia while he steals an engine from him. That's the beginning of their disagreements.
As the three-day rally progresses, they manage to smooth things over, strike a friendship, and start a romance. A young baboon joins them, and together they face the dangers of the wilderness, cunning natives, and the dastardly opera-singing Count Borgia, who together with his minion Feodor, will stop at nothing to get his revenge and win the rally.

== Principal cast ==
Actor	Role
David Carradine	Eddie Miles
Stockard Channing	J.J. Dalton
Christopher Lee	Count Lorenzo Borgia
Hamilton Camp	Feodor
Ian Yule	Freddy Selkirk

== Reception ==
Safari 3000 was panned by contemporary reviews. Film critic JoAnn Rhett said about it, "Every once in a while comes a movie so unredeemably [sic] rotten that a bullet through the brain – yours or the filmaker's – seems the simplest, cleanest course. [...] Racism, sexism, unappealing performances by all, dumb music – name them, they're here." Arts and entertainment critic Lawrence Toppman said, "[...] Aside from being sexist, racist, and xenophobic toward non-Americans, this "comedy" hasn't two funny minutes out of its 90. [...]" TV Guide called it a "weakly scripted adventure," adding, "as its title suggests, is mostly a rip-off of DEATH RACE 2000 (1975). Strictly for the nondiscriminating."

Reviews of the film's DVD release were more forgiving: "What’s amazing about this auto-salvaged mess is that it isn’t just some low-budget schlock studio production. No. This isn’t a Roger Corman Eat My Dust-cum-Grand Theft Auto-cum-Smokey Bites the Dust stock footage recycler: MGM/United Artists — obviously hoping for some Smokey stank on the ol’ celluloid — ended up with a knock off Disney’s The Love Bug. But not all is lost: Christopher Lee is wonderfully deadpan and its adept at comedy. Who knew?! And Stockard Channing is quite the champ dealing with all of the baboons. And ol’ David is Dave: he never disappoints." Film historian Lee Pfeiffer said, "The movie is one of those guilty pleasures that doesn't have the slightest pretense of being anything beyond lightweight entertainment. It's a fun romp and will especially appeal to those who find The Cannonball Run too complicated and Bergmanesque to warm to."

== Home media ==
Safari 3000 was released on DVD on November 22, 2011, as part of the MGM Limited Edition Collection.
