= The Glory Guys =

1965 film by Arnold Laven

- Original film poster by Frank McCarthy
- Directed by: Arnold Laven
- Screenplay by: Sam Peckinpah
- Based on: The Dice of God; 1956 novel by Hoffman Birney
- Produced by: Arthur Gardner; Arnold Laven; Jules V. Levy
- Starring: Tom Tryon; Harve Presnell; Senta Berger; James Caan; Michael Anderson, Jr.
- Cinematography: James Wong Howe
- Edited by: Tom Rolf
- Music by: Riz Ortolani
- Color process: DeLuxe Color
- Production company: Levy-Gardner-Laven
- Distributed by: United Artists
- Release date: July 7, 1965
- Running time: 112 minutes
- Country: United States
- Language: English
- Budget: $1.6 million

The Glory Guys is a 1965 American Western Panavision film directed by Arnold Laven and written by Sam Peckinpah based on the 1956 novel The Dice of God by Hoffman Birney. Produced by Levy-Gardner-Laven and released by United Artists, the film stars Tom Tryon, Harve Presnell, Senta Berger, James Caan and Michael Anderson Jr.

== Plot ==
A group of men enlist in the U.S. Cavalry for service on the Western frontier. Their troop commander Demas Harrod and scout Sol Rogers fall for the same woman.

General McCabe decides to attack one day earlier rather than wait for General Hoffman to arrive, since he wants the credit for a successful attack. Demas reminds him of the orders but the general dismisses his concerns.

As the fight begins for Demas’ regiment, out-numbered by hostiles, General McCabe decides to attack another set of hostiles. With no support, the first company is forced to fall back. They are pursued by hostiles. Sol arrives to assist Demas and his troops.

Demas and Sol go to get water for the injured and are attacked by a small band of hostiles. They fight them but Sol is killed by a lance. Demas and his troops manage to escape. They come across General McCabe. He and his troops have been massacred.

== Cast ==
- Tom Tryon as Capt. Demas Harrod
- Harve Presnell as Scout Sol Rogers
- Senta Berger as Lou Woddard
- Michael Anderson Jr. as Trp. Martin Hale
- James Caan as Trp. Anthony Dugan
- Slim Pickens as Sgt. James Gregory
- Erik Holland as Trp. Clark Gentry
- Adam Williams as Trp. Lucas Crain
- Andrew Duggan as Gen. Frederick McCabe
- Peter Breck as Lt. Bunny Hodges
- Laurel Goodwin as Beth Poole
- Jeanne Cooper as Mrs. Rachael McCabe
- Robert McQueeney as Maj. Oliver Marcus
- Wayne Rogers as Lt. Mike Moran
- Michael Forest as Fred Cushman
- Claudio Brook as Rev. Poole (scenes deleted)

== Production ==
Producers Arthur Gardner, Arnold Laven and Jules Levy sought an inexperienced, and therefore affordable, writer to adapt Hoffman Birney's book The Dice of God into a screenplay. Impressed by Sam Peckinpah's scripts for Gunsmoke, Laven hired Peckinpah to write the screenplay in 1956. Peckinpah worked on the script for more than four months, but the producers were unable to raise funding for the project and it was temporarily abandoned, although Laven worked with Peckinpah in television in the ensuing years.

The project's original title was Custer's Last Stand, but when Twentieth Century-Fox announced its upcoming The Day Custer Fell, later canceled for budgetary reasons, the producers fictionalised the characters and altered the script.

In 1965, with funding finally in place, the production of The Glory Guys began. However, under Laven's direction, the film greatly deviated from Peckinpah's script, with heightened emphasis on its romantic elements. Peckinpah later called the film "... a total disaster because of the casting. All the people in the picture were good. That is, they’ve all been good in other pictures but they didn’t really belong in that one. It’s a wretched film. And one of the reasons I’ve made up my mind not to write any more. But I was on the street. I had to write."

The film was shot in Durango, Mexico, and its climactic battle scene involved thousands of extras on 20,000 acres (81 km^{2}) of land. The scene required several weeks of preparation and filming, including training many horses to fall on cue.

The film's total production cost was approximately $1.6 million.

The titles were created by Joseph Mugnaini for Format Productions.

== Reception ==
Critical reviews were mixed, with some lamenting the film's focus on its love story rather than on the battle with the Indians, who are not shown until the final battle scene.

In a contemporary review, critic Philip K. Scheuer of the Los Angeles Times called the film "pretty much par for the course" and containing "... all the backing and filling and ground-pawing with which an unhappy tradition insists on killing the first hour before we finally mount up and ride out to meet the hostiles." However, Scheuer praised the cinematography: "Producers Levy-Gardner-Laven have made a fairly modest budget stretch into the high, wide and handsome, thanks largely to the panoramic camera focused on the infinite as well as infinity by the resourceful James Wong Howe. Anyhow, Custer's Last Stand really 'plays.'"

== See also ==
- List of American films of 1965
