= Levy-Gardner-Laven =

American film production company

- Industry: Film production
- Founded: 1951 in Beverly Hills, California, U.S.

Levy-Gardner-Laven Productions was an American film production company based in Beverly Hills, California. The principals, Jules V. Levy, Arthur Gardner, and Arnold Laven, met while serving in the Air Force's First Motion Picture Unit during World War II. While serving, they decided to form their own production company after the war ended. The three men formed Levy-Gardner-Laven in 1951.

== Production ==
Levy-Gardner-Laven's first production was the 1952 low-budget crime thriller film Without Warning!.

Laven produced both films and television shows, and he directed many popular American television shows, including episodes of The A-Team, CHiPs, Mannix, The Big Valley, The Greatest American Hero and Hill Street Blues. Gardner was an actor prior to World War II, but chose to produce after the company was formed. Along with Levy, who was a script supervisor prior to the war, Gardner wrote the story for a 1982 movie called Safari 3000. Levy-Gardner-Laven also produced classic T.V. series for Four Star Productions such as The Rifleman, The Big Valley, and The Detectives Starring Robert Taylor, all for ABC.

Levy-Gardner-Laven maintains an office in Beverly Hills, but their last production credit was in 1982.

Jules V Levy died in 2003 at the age of 80 Arnold Laven died in 2009 at the age of 87, Arthur Gardner in 2014 at the age of 104.

== Selected filmography ==
=== Feature films ===
- Without Warning! (1952)
- Down Three Dark Streets (1954)
- The Monster That Challenged the World (1957)
- Geronimo (1962)
- The Glory Guys (1965)
- Clambake (1967)
- The Scalphunters (1968)
- Sam Whiskey (1969)
- Underground (1970)
- The McKenzie Break (1970)
- The Hunting Party (1971)
- Kansas City Bomber (1972)
- White Lightning (1973)
- McQ (1974)
- Brannigan (1975)
- Gator (1976)
- Safari 3000 (1982)

=== Television ===
- The Rifleman (1958–1963)
- Law of the Plainsman (1959–1960)
- The Detectives (1959–1962)
- The Big Valley (1965–1969)
