= Brannigan (film) =

1975 film by Douglas Hickox

- Theatrical release poster by Robert McGinnis
- Directed by: Douglas Hickox
- Screenplay by: Christopher Trumbo; Michael Butler; William P. McGivern; William W. Norton
- Story by: Christopher Trumbo; Michael Butler
- Produced by: Arthur Gardner; Jules Levy
- Starring: John Wayne; Richard Attenborough; Judy Geeson; Mel Ferrer; John Vernon; Ralph Meeker; Daniel Pilon
- Cinematography: Gerry Fisher
- Edited by: Malcolm Cooke
- Music by: Dominic Frontiere
- Production companies: Wellborn Ltd.; Levy-Gardner-Laven; Batjac Productions
- Distributed by: United Artists
- Release dates: 21 March 1975 (Chicago, premiere); 26 March 1975 (US); 12 June 1975 (UK)
- Running time: 111 minutes
- Country: United Kingdom; United States
- Language: English

Brannigan is a 1975 action thriller film directed by Douglas Hickox, and starring John Wayne, Richard Attenborough and Judy Geeson. Set principally in London, the film is about a Chicago police detective (Wayne) sent to Britain to organise the extradition of an American mobster, who is soon kidnapped and held for ransom. Struggling with the restrained policing style of his British counterparts, the tough American detective uses his own brand of law enforcement to recapture the criminal.

It was one of many Dirty Harry–type films released in the wake of that film's success, featuring rogue policemen who don't "play by the rules." Brannigan was filmed on location in London and at Shepperton Studios in Panavision and DeLuxe Color. One of the screenwriters was Dalton Trumbo's son, Christopher Trumbo. This was the only British-produced film of Wayne's 50-year career.

The film was distributed by United Artists on 26 March 1975, in the United States, and on 12 June in the United Kingdom. It received mixed reviews from critics, and was a commercial disappointment.

== Plot ==
Tough lieutenant Jim Brannigan of the Chicago Police Department is sent to London to extradite a notorious American mobster, Ben Larkin. Brannigan is assigned a local Metropolitan Police officer, Detective-Sergeant Jennifer Thatcher, to help while he is in London. But before Brannigan can collect his man, Larkin is kidnapped.

Larkin's finger is cut off and mailed to the police to prove how serious the kidnappers are. His lawyer, Mel Fields, tries to arrange a ransom drop in Piccadilly Circus, while Brannigan makes his way around London in search of Larkin. Whilst struggling to adapt to the British way of life, and the restrained style of policing, he employs techniques not usually seen in Britain.

In the meantime, a contract had already been put out on Brannigan's life by Larkin, so a hitman named Gorman tails Brannigan in a black Jaguar E-Type, making several attempts to kill him and nearly shooting Thatcher by mistake.

Commander Charles Swann, in charge of helping get Larkin to America, is a stuffy, titled, upper-class administrator who is not afraid to get his hands dirty. There is continual conflict between Brannigan and Swann about the American's carrying, and use of, his .38 caliber Colt Diamondback revolver.

Permitted to go alone to deliver the ransom payment, Fields personally eliminates the kidnappers. He and Larkin celebrate having pulled off a scheme to get the money, Larkin calling the loss of a finger a small price to pay. Brannigan bursts in to foil their plans. As he and Jennifer walk away, Gorman tries to mow them down with his car, but he is shot by Brannigan, who can now return home to Chicago.

== Cast ==
- John Wayne as Lieutenant James "Jim" Brannigan, Chicago PD
- Richard Attenborough as Commander Sir Charles Swann, Bart., MPS
- Judy Geeson as Detective-Sergeant Jennifer Thatcher, MPS
- Mel Ferrer as Mel Fields
- John Vernon as Ben Larkin
- Daniel Pilon as Gorman
- Ralph Meeker as Captain Moretti, Chicago PD
- John Stride as Detective-Inspector Michael Traven, MPS
- James Booth as Charlie “The Handle” Caine
- Arthur Batanides as Angell
- Barry Dennen as Julian
- Lesley Anne Down as Luana
- Del Henney as Drexel
- Brian Glover as Jimmy-the-Bet
- Stewart Bevan as Alex
- Janette Legge as Ms Rooke
- Pauline Delaney as Mrs Cooper
- Anthony Booth as Freddy
- Tony Robinson as Dispatch courier
- Don Henderson as Geef
- Kathryn Leigh Scott as Ms Allen

Uncredited

- Mark Burns as Richard, Jennifer’s fiancé
- Jack Watson as Carter
- Tim Barlow as Customs inspector

== Production ==
=== Development and casting ===
The script was originally written under the title Joe Battle in the early 1960's, and was set in the Near East.

The roles of Swann and Thatcher were originally intended for Ralph Richardson and Diana Rigg. Richardson reportedly bowed out at the last minute, but was quoted as saying that John Wayne should try the works of Shakespeare, saying "He is hypnotic. He conveys a sense of mystery, and that's invaluable in Shakespeare."

Canadian actor Daniel Pilon, who previously had appeared mainly in French-language productions in Quebec and France, was cast as the villain Gorman.

=== Filming ===
Brannigan was filmed on location in London and at Shepperton Studios during 1974. Along with The Quiet Man, it is the only John Wayne film not shot principally in the United States.

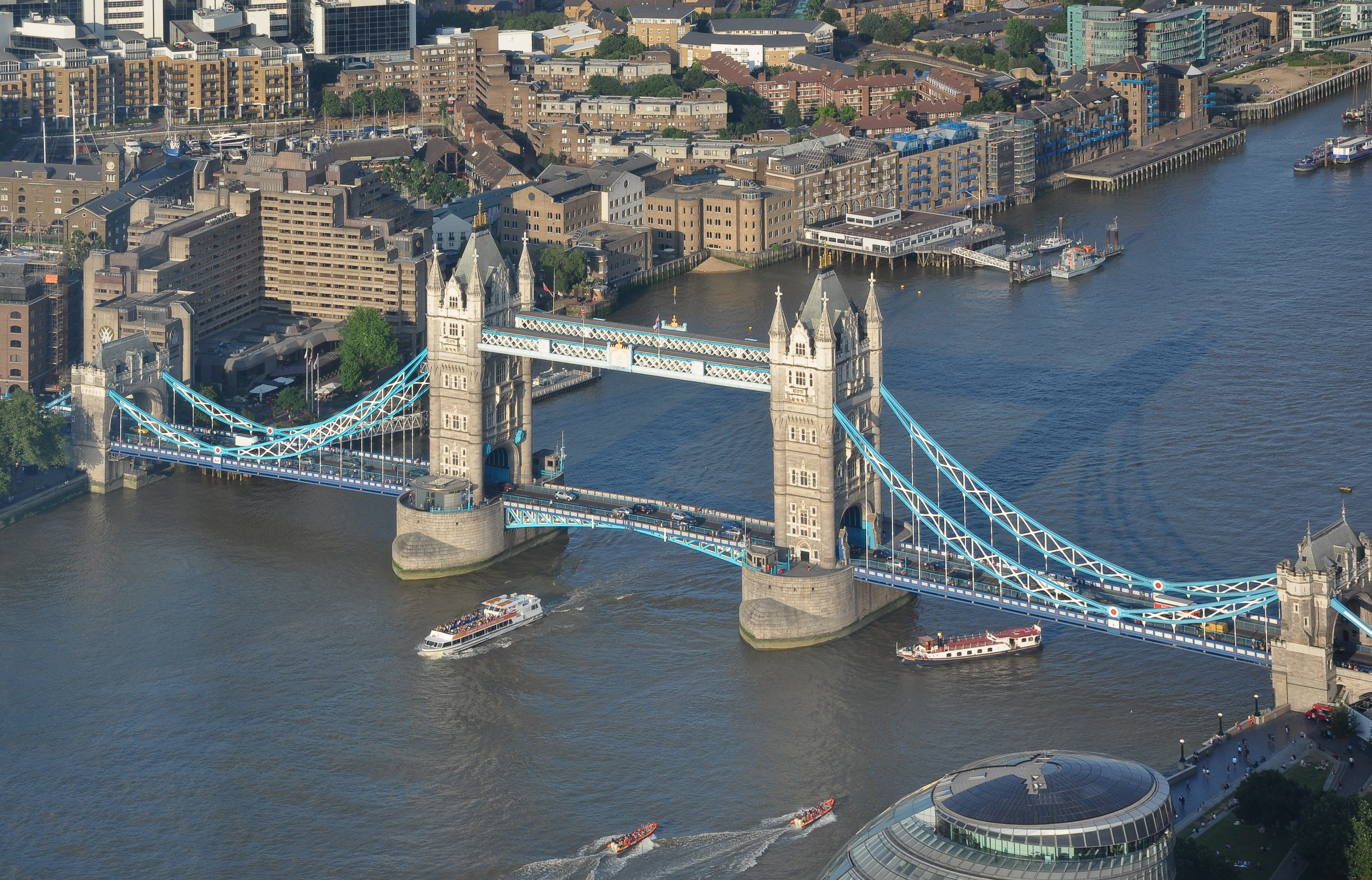
Tower Bridge.

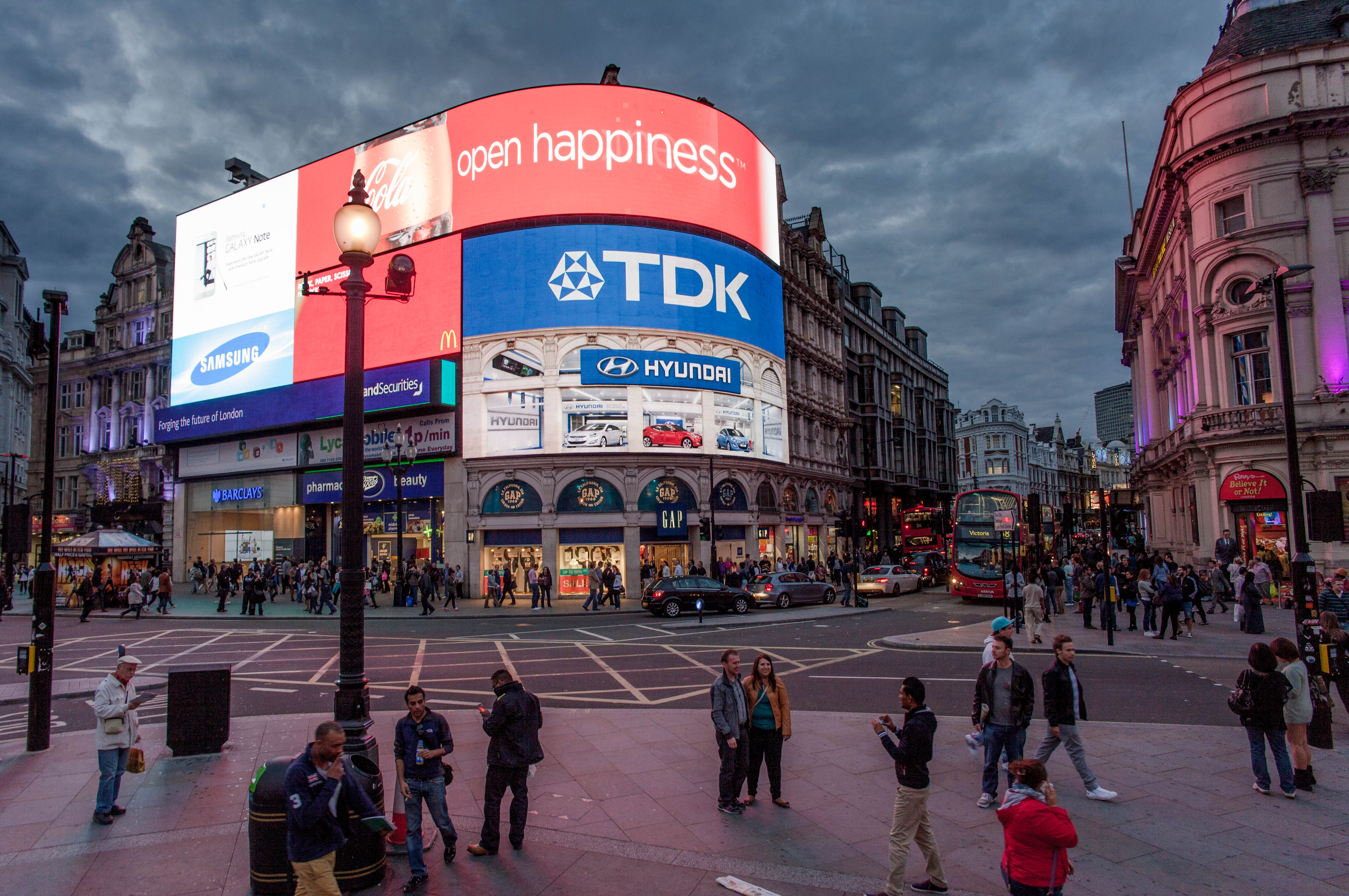
Piccadilly Circus.

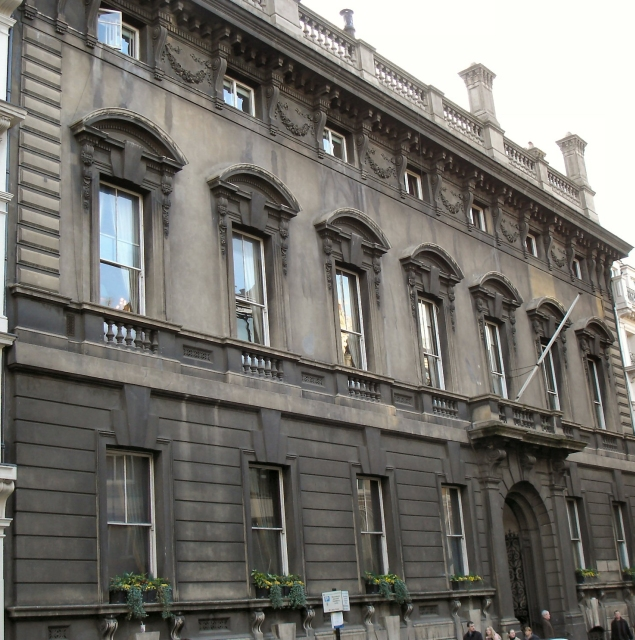
The Garrick Club.

The film's action sequences included a car chase through Battersea's Shaftesbury and Winstanley Estates, Wandsworth and Central London featuring Brannigan jumping a yellow Ford Capri coupé across the half raised Tower Bridge. The jump itself was accomplished with scale models of both the bridge and the car. Ford supplied most of the vehicles used in the film, which came from their press fleet. One sequence features shots of the interior and exterior of London's Royal Automobile Club, which has changed little since the shooting of the film. The Capri's jump was one of the last significant appearances of Tower Bridge without its red, white and blue paint scheme which was applied in 1977 to commemorate the Silver Jubilee of Elizabeth II. A fight sequence was filmed in the Lamb Tavern in Leadenhall Market. The E-Type Jaguar that Gorman drives in the film still exists and is in the hands of a private collector today.

Conversely, the film's opening sequence and first several minutes display Chicago roadways, riverside buildings and an early O'Hare Terminal 1 that have all been razed and replaced. For example, the film opens on a squad car making the former turn on Upper Lake Shore Drive where East Wacker Drive now exists and where Field Drive had been planned to intersect; in the background, iron workers can be seen constructing the connecting portion of Upper Wacker. The 300 block of North Canal Street, where Brannigan conducts an investigation using "enhanced interrogation techniques", rapidly developed between this film, Doctor Detroit, and Raw Deal, and has further developed through to the present day. As Brannigan approaches O'Hare, the Kennedy Expressway is devoid of both commercial development to the north and south, and the Blue Line tracks in the median.

Likewise, West India Quay, immediately north of the Isle of Dogs has become unrecognisable with the development of the Docklands in general and Canary Wharf in particular. The location is seen as a derelict, nearly-abandoned dockside during Brannigan's confrontation with the motor-scooter messenger (Tony Robinson), and has since been radically transformed. Much of the film was also filmed in Beckton Gasworks and parts of North Woolwich and Silvertown in Newham's part of Docklands. When a hole is blown in Brannigan's lavatory wall, he looks out to see the Albert Memorial, its statue still coated in thick black paint rather than gold leaf. At the time of filming, the Trafalgar Square post office occupied not only its current footprint, but extended throughout the adjoining commercial spaces, and was marked by an unusually shaped sign extending out from the corner of the building.

It contains a piece of footage of the inside of the Garrick Club, which traditionally does not allow cameras and was only agreed to as Richard Attenborough was a long-term member. In the scene in which Brannigan and Commander Swann are at the bar in the Garrick Club, on the wall behind them are portraits of Laurence Olivier and John Gielgud, both in Garrick Club ties.

Other notable London shooting locations included Piccadilly Circus and The Dorchester. The pub sequence was shot at the Lamb Tavern in Leadenhall Market.

After a Chicago Police officer was depicted in an unflattering light in an episode of the 1957–60 television series M Squad, then-Mayor Richard J. Daley thereafter discouraged motion picture and television location filming in the city for the rest of his administration and its aftermath. Brannigan is one of the few films – along with Cooley High, also released in 1975 – to have been approved and granted police assistance during the two-decade era.

== Release ==
The film premiered in Chicago on March 21, 1975. It opened in American theatres five days later, and in the UK on June 12.

== Reception ==
The film holds a score of 46% on Rotten Tomatoes based on 65 reviews. The consensus summarizes: "Brannigan unsuccessfully attempts to blend John Wayne's roughhouse American persona with British crime caper flair, offering stale action and touristy London backdrops that leave it feeling more flat than fun."

Roger Ebert gave the film 2 stars out of a possible 4, writing, "Brannigan isn't great, but it's a wellcrafted [sic] action movie and, besides, it's got John Wayne in it." A. H. Weiler of The New York Times stated, "Unfortunately, Mr. Wayne's first film trip to London doesn't appear to have been necessary. He and his busy company only serve to make 'Brannigan' a commonplace crime caper." Arthur D. Murphy of Variety called it "an okay John Wayne actioner," adding, "The clash between U.S. and British law enforcement philosophies is dramatized in potboiler oversimplification, and there's just enough Anglophobia to satisfy the yahoo trade."

Conversely, Gene Siskel of the Chicago Tribune awarded 3 stars out of 4 and noted, "If you enjoy Wayne's he-man antics, then 'Brannigan' is your kind of flick. It's as simple as that." Kevin Thomas of the Los Angeles Times praised the film as a "smart, lively thriller" with a script that has "an affectionate sense of fun yet genuine respect for the mythical figure that John Wayne has become."

Tom Shales of The Washington Post wrote that the film "is primarily a humdrum slugfest, from the same producers as last year's slovenly Wayne vehicle, McQ ... What 'Brannigan' does have over 'McQ' is locale: London is a big improvement on Seattle."

Richard Combs of The Monthly Film Bulletin observed, "After a sleek recapping of the Clint Eastwood formula in a credits sequence that is all caressing close-ups of the hero's prized revolver, Brannigan spends most of its time hastily backpedalling in order to find some comfortable, old-fashioned niche in the formula for its star ... in fact, the film becomes more and more of a throwback, in everything from Brannigan's chaste relationship with his Girl Friday ... to his abrasive partnership with his opposite number from Scotland Yard." After turning down the starring role in Dirty Harry, and seeing the subsequent success of that film, Wayne made two police thrillers, McQ in 1974 and this "cop out of water" film in 1975.

Filmmakers Quentin Tarantino and Edgar Wright have praised the film.

== Home media ==
On 2 October 2001 Brannigan was released on DVD for the first time.

The film is available through Amazon.com in a two-pack with Killer Force, and was released for the first time on Blu-ray through Screen Archives Entertainment on 8 July 2014. It was later released on Blu-Ray in the US by Kino Lorber in December 2017. The British Film Institute (BFI) released Brannigan on Blu-ray for the first time in the UK on August 21, 2023.

== See also ==
- John Wayne filmography
