= Clambake (film) =

1967 film by Arnold Laven, Arthur Gardner, Jules Levy

- Theatrical release poster
- Directed by: Arthur H. Nadel
- Written by: Arthur Browne Jr.
- Produced by: Arthur Gardner; Arnold Laven; Jules Levy
- Starring: Elvis Presley; Will Hutchins; Shelley Fabares; Bill Bixby; Gary Merrill; James Gregory
- Cinematography: William Margulies
- Edited by: Tom Rolf
- Music by: Jeff Alexander
- Production companies: Levy-Gardner-Laven; Rhodes Pictures
- Distributed by: United Artists
- Release date: October 18, 1967 (US)
- Running time: 100 minutes
- Country: United States
- Language: English

Clambake is a 1967 American musical beach party film directed by Arthur H. Nadel and starring Elvis Presley, Shelley Fabares, Bill Bixby, Gary Merrill and James Gregory. Written for the screen by Arthur Browne Jr., the film is about the heir to an oil fortune (Presley) who trades places with a water-ski instructor at a Florida hotel (Will Hutchins) to see if girls will like him for himself, rather than his father's money. Clambake was the last of Presley's four films for United Artists, and was accompanied by the release of a soundtrack of the same name. The film reached number 15 on the national weekly box-office charts.

Presley considered Clambake to be the worst of his films.

== Plot ==
Scott Hayward rebels against the plans and expectations of his father, extremely rich oil tycoon Duster Hayward. He drives to Florida in his red 1959 Chevrolet Corvette Stingray Racer to find himself. When Scott stops for gas and refreshments, he encounters Tom Wilson, who is on his way to take a job as a water skiing instructor at a Miami hotel. A chance remark by Tom gives Scott the idea to switch identities with Tom so he can find out how people react to him as an ordinary person rather than as a millionaire. Tom has fun staying at the same hotel and pretending he is rich.

Shortly after, hotel guest Dianne Carter insists on taking a water ski lesson minutes after Scott checks in with his new "employer". However, once they are out on the water, Dianne proves herself to be an expert skier, performing fancy maneuvers to gain the attention of wealthy young playboy James J. Jamison III. Later, Dianne confesses to Scott that she is a gold digger, assuming that he is one, too. Scott agrees to help Dianne land Jamison, but ends up falling for her himself.

Scott persuades boat builder Sam Burton to allow him to rebuild Burton's Rawhide, a high-performance boat that was damaged when raced at high speed, and drive it in the annual Orange Bowl Race, which Jamison has won the last three years. Scott sends for some "goop", an experimental coating one of his father's companies spent a lot of money trying (and failing) to perfect. Between his day job and working on the goop at night, Scott is run ragged, but he thinks he has fixed the goop's major flaw: losing its strength in water. With no time for testing before the race, he applies it to the boat's hull and hopes it will hold the Rawhide together. Duster learns where his son is and comes to see what he is doing. To Scott's surprise, his father is enormously proud of what he is doing.

Meanwhile, Jamison proposes to Dianne. Scott enters the suite before she can give Jamison an answer, but the playboy informs Scott they are getting married right after he wins the race. Dianne, however, decides to give up her scheme and return home.

In the race, Jamison takes the lead in his boat, the Scarlet Lady, but Scott passes him at the finish line. Scott then offers to give Dianne a lift. On the drive, he gives her an engagement ring he bought with the winnings from the race. Dianne insists that Scott take it back, but agrees to marry him. This prompts Scott to confess to Dianne who he really is. She does not believe him at first, but when he shows her his driver's license, she faints.

== Cast ==
- Elvis Presley as Scott Hayward/"Tom Wilson"
- Shelley Fabares as Dianne Carter
- Will Hutchins as Tom Wilson/"Scott Hayward"
- Bill Bixby as James J. Jamison III
- Gary Merrill as Sam Burton
- James Gregory as Duster Hayward
- Suzie Kaye as Sally
- Harold Peary (credited as "Hal Peary") as the Doorman
- Sam Riddle as the Announcer
- Angelique Pettyjohn as Gloria
- Olga Kaya as Gigi
- Jack Good as Hathaway
- Lee Krieger as Bartender
- Wallace Earl Laven (credited as "Amanda Harley") as Ellie
- Sue England as Cigarette girl
- Marj Dusay as the Waitress
- Charlie Hodge as Mr. Hayward's barber (uncredited)

In uncredited appearances: one of the dancers is Teri Garr; among the kids during the "Confidence" scene is a young Corbin Bernsen; and the little girl afraid to go down a playground slide, to whom Elvis sings, is Lisa Slagle, who later joined the Joffrey Ballet. The water-skiing and Corvette-driving double for Presley was Artie Warren. (Warren was then employed at Leo Benz's Ski School for water skiers.) Lee Majors connived his way in as an extra in the film, playing a mustachioed waiter in the lounge scene about 22 minutes in. He confirmed this in 2017, at the 2017 Florida Supercon fan convention.

== Production ==
After numerous delays, principal photography on Clambake began on March 13, 1967. Clambake was the last film for which Presley was able to demand and receive a salary of $1 million. The relatively lackluster box-office performance of this movie, combined with his desire to do more serious, less commercial films, meant that studios were no longer willing to guarantee him a million dollars or more for his performance.

In her 1985 book Elvis and Me, on which Sandra Harmon collaborated with her, Priscilla Presley writes that by the time filming began on Clambake, Elvis' growing distress with the quality of his films led to a despondency accompanied by overeating that had his weight balloon from his normal 170 lb (77 kg) to 200 lb (91 kg). (Elvis, Albert Goldman's 1981 biography of Presley, corroborates this statement Priscilla made to Harmon.) A movie studio executive ordered him to lose the weight in a hurry, marking the introduction of diet pills to his already excessive regimen of medications.

During this time, owing to the involvement of Larry Geller, a hair stylist who later became one of "The Guys" (also called the "Memphis Mafia"), as Presley called his entourage, in his life, Presley was growing increasingly interested in religious studies and spirituality, and was reading a great deal on the subjects. Colonel Tom Parker felt that these pursuits were distracting Elvis from his performance, and he ordered the singer not to read any books while the film was being shot; there is no evidence to indicate that Presley complied with the directive.

Production was delayed for two weeks at the beginning of the shoot when Elvis fell and hit his head in his L.A. mansion, resulting in a mild concussion.

Although set in Florida, only some second-unit stock footage was shot there - including the prominent use of the Miami Marine Stadium, where the climactic speedboat race was filmed, with California close-ups of Elvis and Bill Bixby cut in. Virtually the entire film was shot in southern California (resulting in the scene with the sun seemingly setting over the ocean in the east). Several exterior "Florida" scenes also have very conspicuous California mountains in the background. Other bloopers include oil fields in Florida. The boats in the boat garage have registration numbers starting with "CF" (California) and not "FL" (Florida).

In Japan, the film was released under the alternate title Blue Miami (rendered in Japanese script), a reference to the earlier Presley film Blue Hawaii (1961).

== Soundtrack ==
The soundtrack album reached number 40 on the Billboard album chart.

== Reception ==
The film premiered in October 1967, but did not have a wide release until December. The New York Times' critic Howard Thompson called the film "a real Christmas clinker" and a "silly, tired little frolic," remarking that "even staunch Presley admirers—and we're one of them when he delivers the likes of Fun in Acapulco and Viva Las Vegas—will have to strain to justify this one." Thompson panned everything in the film, including the co-stars, music, predictable finale, the overuse of rear-screen projection, and the obvious location shots of the West Coast of the U.S.

Variety ran a positive review, declaring it one of Presley's "top offerings to date, backed by a legitimately-premised story line, melodic songs, acceptable acting and winding with a spectacular water race. Film has all the makings of being one of Presley's heaviest grossers."

Kevin Thomas of the Los Angeles Times wrote, "Like most Presley pictures, this one ... is pleasant and unpretentious yet has a synthetic appearance. The starlets look lacquered, the sets plasticized and there's much reliance on process work."

The Monthly Film Bulletin wrote that Presley "floats amiably through a flimsy story enlivened only by an occasional touch of humour and an engaging performance from James Gregory as a drawling Texan oil millionaire." The review thought that "the only really jarring note is the very unpersonable heroine."

FilmInk felt Presley and Fabares had none of the chemistry they showed in Girl Happy.

Presley himself considered Clambake to be his worst movie.

== In popular culture ==
In the 2005 miniseries Elvis, a scene depicts a frustrated Presley (played by Jonathan Rhys Meyers) on the set of Clambake, filming the "Who Needs Money" motorcycle scene. Presley also mentions to Colonel Parker that he only signed on to do the movie because he [Parker] told him to, and that he needs the money.

Mark Knopfler's song "Back to Tupelo" from his solo album "Shangri-La" (2004) is about the dissatisfaction Elvis Presley has with his life and his movies around the time of the film, mentioning it in the first stanza and then again towards the end of the song.

== See also ==
- List of American films of 1967
- Elvis Presley on film and television
