= The McKenzie Break =

1970 British film by Lamont Johnson

- Directed by: Lamont Johnson
- Written by: William W. Norton
- Based on: The Bowmanville Break; 1958 novel by Sidney Shelley
- Produced by: Arthur Gardner; Jules V. Levy
- Starring: Brian Keith; Helmut Griem; Ian Hendry; Jack Watson
- Cinematography: Michael Reed
- Edited by: Tom Rolf
- Music by: Riz Ortolani
- Production companies: Brighton Pictures; Levy-Gardner-Laven
- Distributed by: United Artists
- Release date: 28 October 1970 (New York City)
- Running time: 108 min.
- Country: United Kingdom
- Language: English / German

The McKenzie Break (also known as Escape) is a 1970 British war drama film directed by Lamont Johnson and starring Brian Keith, Helmut Griem, Ian Hendry and Jack Watson. It was written by William W. Norton, produced by Arthur Gardner and Jules V. Levy and filmed in DeLuxe Color.

== Plot ==
At the McKenzie prisoner of War (POW) camp in north Scotland, Kapitän zur See Willi Schlüter – a Kriegsmarine U-boat commander – challenges the authority of the camp’s by-the-book commanding officer, Major Perry. Because British officers have been shackled in Germany, Perry has been ordered to handcuff an equal number of German officers as a reprisal. The Germans refuse to appear at roll call, then ambush the British guards when they attempt to force the prisoners out of their barracks.

Captain Jack Connor, seconded from the Royal Ulster Rifles to British Army Intelligence, a crime reporter during peacetime, is bailed out by his patron General Kerr from punishment for various off-duty indiscretions. Connor is sent to Camp McKenzie to investigate the escalating tensions, and effectively assumes operational control from Perry.

There is a clear divide between the German submariners and members of the Luftwaffe. Schlüter accuses the air force prisoners of disloyalty when they show little interest in insurrection or escape, while the Luftwaffe men question Schlüter's motives and tactics - which include the construction of a tunnel that is nearing completion. The divide leads to a group of German sailors savagely beating one of the Luftwaffe men, Lieutenant Neuchl, during a confrontation between prisoners and guards. In the ensuing chaos two Germans dressed as British soldiers escape. The delirious Neuchl is hospitalized, and keeps repeating the phrase "twenty-eight submariners". Before he can be questioned a fight is staged in the hospital to distract the guards, and Neuchl is murdered to prevent him from talking.

Unknown to Schlüter, Connor had a cryptographer break the code used in POWs' letters to Germany and is aware of the basics of the escape plan, and feels the best way to end the escape threat is to let the Germans escape and be captured by special patrols. Schlüter, fearing discovery of the tunnel, orders the plan to go ahead immediately. Taking advantage of heavy rain saturating an attic full of soil from the tunnel excavation, Schlüter triggers a cave-in atop a barrack full of Luftwaffe prisoners in order to divert attention from the escape. Schlüter and a small group of submariners escape and drive to the coast in a lorry for a pre-arranged rendezvous with the German U-boat U-841.

When the Germans elude Connor's patrols, local police and the Royal Navy are alerted to assist, but the disguised lorry succeeds in reaching the rendezvous spot on the coast. While the escapees prepare inflatable boats for the ride out to the submarine, an enthusiastic sailor drives the truck into a large hole to conceal it from aerial observation. The force of the impact sets off the gasoline and the ensuing fire draws the attention of the spotter aircraft Connor is flying in. They alert a motor torpedo boat (MTB) to intervene.

The rafts reach the U-boat and the escapees start boarding as the MTB arrives on scene, forcing the U-841 to crash dive, abandoning the last raft that Schlüter is in. Schlüter glares at Connor overhead, who observes aloud that both are "in the shithouse now" - Schlüter for escaping and murdering other prisoners, and Connor for his unorthodox response to the escape attempt which largely succeeded.

== Cast ==
- Brian Keith as Captain Jack Connor
- Helmut Griem as Kapitän zur See Willi Schlüter
- Ian Hendry as Major Perry (Camp CO)
- Jack Watson as Major General Ben Kerr
- Patrick O'Connell as Sergeant Major Cox
- Horst Janson as Lieutenant Neuchl
- Alexander Allerson as Lieutenant Wolff
- John Abineri as Captain Kranz
- Constantine Gregory as Lieutenant Hall
- Tom Kempinski as Lieutenant Schmidt
- Eric Allan as Lieutenant Hochbauer
- Caroline Mortimer as A.T.S. Sergeant Bell
- Mary Larkin as Corporal Jean Watt
- Gregg Palmer as Lieutenant Berger
- Michael Sheard as Ingenieur-Offizier Unger
- Ingo Mogendorf as Lt Fullgrabe

== Background ==
The plot of the film loosely reflects real-life events at a POW camp in Ontario, Canada; in particular, the interception of German attempts to communicate in code with the captured U-boat ace Otto Kretschmer, and the "trial" of Captain Hans-Joachim Rahmlow and his second-in-command, Bernhard Berndt from U-570, which was surrendered in September 1941, and recommissioned as HMS Graph. Kretschmer was also the subject of Operation Kiebitz, an attempt to liberate several U-boat commanders from Bowmanville by submarine, which was foiled by the Royal Canadian Navy.

== Production ==
The film was based on the novel The Bowmanville Break by Sidney Shelley. Film rights were bought in January 1968, prior to the novel's publication, by the producing team of Jules Gardner, Arthur Levy and Arnold Laven, who ran LGL Productions and had a deal with United Artists. William Norton, who had done several scripts for LGL, was assigned to write the screenplay. The location of the story was shifted from Canada to Scotland.

In October 1968 Brian Keith signed to play the lead role. That month the novel was published. The New York Times called it "a crackling tale". "In the best tradition of escape literature," said the Chicago Tribune.

In February 1969 Andre De Toth was signed to direct. By April he had left the project and been replaced by Lamont Johnson. The film had been retitled The MacKenzie Break.

The film was shot in Ireland, at Ardmore Studios Co. Wicklow, and in Bonmahon, Co. Waterford, in October 1969.

== Reception ==
The Monthly Film Bulletin wrote: "A modest but surprisingly effective little film, which starts with the advantage of an ingenious and well-scripted story, but really scores in its unobtrusive concern for authenticity. Not only does McKenzie camp look like a prisoner-of-war camp, but the soldiers behave like soldiers, the Germans speak German, and the equipment on hand – from riot shields and guns to escape lorry, torpedo boat and reconnaissance plane – testifies to a budget well spent (not too much of it, not too little, but just right). Above all, the various character clashes in the film (Perry-Connor, Connor-Schluetter, Schluetter-Neuchl) are quietly, credibly and observantly built up to sidestep their melodramatic possibilities, with excellent performances all round. Perhaps the script might have dug more incisively into the U-Boat/Luftwaffe split, with its hints of anti-Semitism and homosexual-baiting; and perhaps tighter editing might have avoided some of the sagging moments; but on the whole this is what might once have been described as an unusually intelligent B-feature, in which even the Irish locations manage to stand in for a credible Scotland."
