= The Scalphunters =

1968 film

- Theatrical release poster
- Directed by: Sydney Pollack
- Written by: William W. Norton
- Produced by: Arthur Gardner; Arnold Laven; Jules V. Levy; Roland Kibbee; Burt Lancaster
- Starring: Burt Lancaster; Shelley Winters; Telly Savalas; Ossie Davis
- Cinematography: Richard Moore; Duke Callaghan
- Edited by: John Woodcock
- Music by: Elmer Bernstein
- Production company: Norlan Productions
- Distributed by: United Artists
- Release date: April 2, 1968
- Running time: 102 minutes
- Country: United States
- Language: English
- Box office: $2,800,000 (US/Canada)

The Scalphunters is a 1968 American Western film starring Burt Lancaster, Ossie Davis and Telly Savalas. The film was directed by Sydney Pollack, with the score written by Elmer Bernstein. Davis was nominated for a Golden Globe for Best Supporting Actor for his performance in the film. Filming took place in Sierra de Órganos National Park in the town of Sombrerete, Mexico.

== Plot ==
Joe Bass (Burt Lancaster), an American fur trapper, is on his way to sell the hides he has amassed over the winter. He encounters a group of Kiowa Indians led by Two Crows (Armando Silvestre), who take his furs. In exchange, they give a disgusted Bass a slave, Joseph Lee (Ossie Davis), whom they had taken from a group of Comanches.

Lee is a well-educated and refined house slave, unfamiliar with the ways of the wilderness. Bass sets out to recover the furs from the Kiowa. Lee makes an unsuccessful attempt to escape, then follows along. As Lee and Bass catch up to the Kiowa, they watch them being ambushed by a group of scalphunters, after the bounty offered by the government for each Native American scalp they bring in. The scalphunters, led by Jim Howie (Telly Savalas), kill the Kiowas and take Bass's furs. Bass and Lee trail the new group.

Lee stumbles over a cliff and is captured by the scalphunters. Howie decides to sell him in Galveston, Texas. As they travel southwards, Jim Howie's girlfriend, Kate (Shelley Winters), reveals to Lee that they are heading for Mexico. He begins to win her favor, by doing her hair and telling her fortune, hoping she will persuade Howie to take him with them to Mexico (where slavery is illegal), rather than sell him. Bass pins them down with sniper fire, forcing them to let loose the packhorse carrying the furs. He is ambushed and the scalphunters recover the furs and proceed on their way. Approaching their camp at night, Bass tries to persuade Lee to help him, but the slave is now set on going to Mexico and refuses him assistance.

Bass kills several of the scalphunters by starting a rock slide in the mountains. Then he contaminates the water of a nearby creek with locoweed, a toxic plant that causes the scalphunters' horses to run and buck wildly after they drink the water. They send Lee as a go-between to Bass, telling him he can keep the furs. A wary Bass comes down to collect the lone packhorse, but is ambushed by Howie. In an ensuing struggle, Howie is shot dead by Lee. The bickering Bass and Lee then fight, but neither can beat the other. Kiowas attack and overrun the scalphunters. Two Crows, who had survived the earlier massacre, has fetched reinforcements. He again takes the furs. Bass and Lee, now friends, prepare to follow the Kiowas to retrieve the furs yet again.

== Cast ==
- Burt Lancaster as Joe Bass
- Shelley Winters as Kate
- Telly Savalas as Jim Howie
- Ossie Davis as Joseph Lee
- Dabney Coleman as Jed
- Paul Picerni as Frank
- Dan Vadis as Yuma
- Armando Silvestre as Two Crows
- Nick Cravat as Yancy

== Novelization ==
Shortly before the release of the film, per the timing custom of the era, Gold Medal Books published a novelization of the screenplay by veteran pulpsmith Richard Wormser as "Ed Friend" (a pseudonym he employed for most of his media tie-in work). It qualifies as an "inferred novelization" as the source screenplay is not directly credited as the basis, though the copyright is assigned to Norlan Productions and Bristol Pictures—and the film is referenced on the front and back covers of the first edition. The Scalp-Hunters was not the only Gold Medal novelization of the era to tacitly disguise itself as a novel original to its author, and thus the basis for the film—and in this case, the strategy seems to have paid off; the book stayed in print well beyond the theatrical run of the movie: Future editions of the book (there was a second printing and a re-release about a decade later) eschewed mention of the film altogether.
