= Visit to a Chief's Son =

1974 film by Lamont Johnson

- Film poster
- Directed by: Lamont Johnson
- Screenplay by: Albert Ruben (as Al Ruben)
- Story by: Robert Halmi Sr. (as Robert Halmi)
- Starring: Richard Mulligan
- Cinematography: Ernest Day
- Edited by: Tom Rolf
- Music by: Francis Lai
- Production company: Robert Halmi
- Distributed by: United Artists
- Release date: March 15, 1974
- Running time: 92 minutes
- Country: United States
- Language: English

Visit to a Chief's Son is a 1974 American biographical adventure film directed by Lamont Johnson and starring Richard Mulligan and Johnny Sekka.

== Plot ==
An American anthropologist and his son benefit from their experiences with an East African tribe.

== Cast ==
- Richard Mulligan as Robert
- Johnny Sekka as Nermolok
- John Philip Hogdon as Kevin
- Jesse Kinaru as Codonyo
- Jock Anderson as Jock
- Chief Lomoiro as Chief

== Background ==
The film is based on a memoir titled Visit to a Chief's Son: An American Boy's Adventure with an African Tribe which was written by Robert Halmi and Ann Kennedy and published in 1963.

The book details the experiences shared by Halmi and his 9-year-old stepson Kevin Gorman during a trip to Kenya in 1962. During their stay with a Maasai tribe, Kevin befriended Dionni (named Codonyo in the film), the chief's son. Kevin taught Dionni how to play baseball and in turn, Dionni taught him how to hunt buffaloes and zebras and the tribe's elders taught him how to be a spear-thrower. He also learnt 11 words in Swahili and kept a diary of his experiences.

Halmi took photographs of Kevin's many adventures alongside his new friend and included them in an article titled American Boy's Storybook of Adventures in Deepest Africa: 'I Go Visit a Chief's Son' which was published in the April 13, 1962 issue of Life Magazine.

== Rating controversy ==
The film features a brief scene in which both Kevin (John Philip Hogdon) and Codonyo (Jesse Kinaru) are seen swimming and playing nude together in a lake in which there are also several hippopotamus nearby. As Kevin goes into the water having taken off all his clothes, Codonyo remarks he notices his friend is already circumcised.

Because of this scene the film was originally given an R-rating. In a 1974 interview, Johnson stated:

Four frames of film in which a barely perceptible view of a 12-year-old boy's penis appeared in an underwater sequence gave my movie Visit to a Chief's Son an R-rating until the objectionable subliminal flash was blown up to eliminate it. That my film, from its conception to its final cut an unabashed family, kids-and-animals-in-Africa picture, should have the same rating as The Exorcist (1973) is an obscenity symptomatic of our national disease of censorship.

== Music ==
The film's original score composed by Francis Lai was released by Music Box Records.
