= McQ =

1974 film by John Sturges

- Theatrical release poster
- Directed by: John Sturges
- Written by: Lawrence Roman
- Produced by: Jules Levy; Arthur Gardner
- Starring: John Wayne; Eddie Albert; Diana Muldaur; Colleen Dewhurst; Clu Gulager; David Huddleston; Al Lettieri
- Cinematography: Harry Stradling Jr.
- Edited by: William Ziegler
- Music by: Elmer Bernstein
- Production company: Batjac Productions
- Distributed by: Warner Bros.
- Release dates: January 4, 1974 (Seattle); February 6, 1974 (Limited)
- Running time: 111 minutes
- Country: United States
- Language: English
- Box office: $4 million

McQ is a 1974 American Panavision neo-noir crime action film directed by John Sturges and starring John Wayne. It costars Eddie Albert, Diana Muldaur, and Al Lettieri, and features Colleen Dewhurst, Clu Gulager, David Huddleston, Julian Christopher (credited as Jim Watkins), Roger E. Mosley, and William Bryant in supporting roles. The film was shot in Washington, making extensive use of locations in Seattle and with a sequence near the end filmed on the Pacific Coast in Moclips, Washington.

== Plot ==
Before dawn in Seattle, Detective Sergeant Stan Boyle drives around town and shoots two police officers on the job. After the killings, he cleans up at a luncheonette and a police badge is visible on his belt. When a car pulls up, Boyle goes outside and gives the driver a satchel containing his gun. As he walks away, the driver shoots him in the back with a shotgun.

Detective Lieutenant Lon "McQ" McHugh is awakened by a colleague calling with the news that his longtime partner Boyle has been shot along with two other officers. As he rushes to work, McQ notices a carjacker trying to steal his 1973 Pontiac Firebird Trans Am. As he is distracted, someone shoots at McQ. He kills the assailant and recognizes him as Paddy Samuels, a professional hitman.

Boyle is in critical condition at Harborview Medical Center. McQ briefly visits with Boyle's wife Lois. At the police station, Captain Edward Kosterman is working on the theory that counterculture militants shot his officers. McQ suspects local narcotics dealer Manny Santiago is responsible. Despite a warning from Kosterman to leave the shooting investigation to other detectives, McQ begins tailing Santiago. When he learns Boyle has died from his wound, he follows Santiago into a men's restroom and beats him viciously. Threatened with desk duty, McQ resigns, against the urgings of Franklyn Toms, a field deputy who works as a liaison between the city council and police department.

McQ partners with a private investigator, Edward "Pinky" Farrow and reaches out to informants Rosey and Myra. He learns that Santiago is planning to steal cocaine from the police before the entire shipment can be destroyed. When the State Attorney General's office takes the drugs to be destroyed, McQ goes after them. Disguised as laundry workers, Santiago's team manages to hijack the entire stash. McQ gives chase but loses them when he tails an identical laundry truck.

Kosterman confiscates McQ's revolver. He buys a pistol and borrows a MAC-10 submachine gun from his usual gun store. McQ breaks into Santiago's office and is confronted by him. He reveals that corrupt police officers had replaced the drugs with powdered sugar before Santiago stole them. He repays McQ for the earlier beating.

McQ begins to suspect Kosterman. Rosey and Myra hint that Boyle might have been dirty, and Myra is killed after McQ leaves her. When McQ rushes to Myra's, he is caught in an alley between two semi-trucks, which crush his car. Realizing the attack was not meant to be lethal, McQ checks out his car at the impound lot. There is dust from the missing drugs inside. Acting on a tip about the drugs, Kosterman surrounds the lot with officers, but McQ manages to escape.

McQ visits Lois, who is leaving to visit her parents. McQ joins her for the drive. He has deduced that Lois double-crossed Boyle, who had been concealing the drugs in McQ's car. He finds the drugs in Lois' suitcase. He notices they are being followed and directs Lois to a nearby beach. A shootout ensues, and McQ kills their pursuer who turned out to be Toms. Santiago's men arrive and chase McQ down the beach. McQ kills them with his MAC-10. Lois is arrested. Kosterman gives McQ back his badge, and they get a drink at a bar.

== Cast ==
- John Wayne as Detective Lieutenant Lon "McQ" McHugh
- Eddie Albert as Captain Edward Kosterman
- Diana Muldaur as Lois Boyle
- Colleen Dewhurst as Myra
- Clu Gulager as Frank Toms
- David Huddleston as Edward "Pinky" Farrow
- Jim Watkins as J.C.
- Al Lettieri as Manny Santiago
- Julie Adams as Elaine McHugh Forrester
- Roger E. Mosley as Rosey
- William Bryant as Sergeant Stan Boyle
- Richard Kelton as Radical
- Richard Eastham as Walter Forrester
- Larry Buck as Chief Grogan (uncredited)
- Kim Sanford as Ginger McHugh (uncredited)

== Production ==
A few years prior to making this film, John Wayne had passed on playing the lead Harry Callahan in Dirty Harry (1971), a decision he later admitted regretting. Dirty Harry was set in Seattle in one version of the script, but the setting was changed to San Francisco when Clint Eastwood became connected to the project.

McQ was shot in 1973 on location in Seattle, Aberdeen, and the Quinault Indian Reservation in Washington. While filming the beach scenes, the crew stayed at the Polynesian Hotel (The "Poly") in Ocean Shores.

The dramatic car chase in which Lon "McQ" McHugh (Wayne), in his character's green 1973 Pontiac Firebird Trans Am "Green Hornet", pursues the laundry van was influenced by Frank Bullitt (Steve McQueen)'s chase scene in Bullitt (1968).

When preparing to flip the car during the beach chase without using ramps, stunt driver Hal Needham performed the very first car stunt using a black powder cannon charge. On the second practice run down in Los Angeles, the car was unknowingly overcharged, and Needham was nearly killed. Gary McLarty performed the stunt on the beach that is featured in the film.

One of Wayne's famous lines from this film is delivered as McQ is being rescued from his car after it has been crushed between two semi-trucks with him trapped inside. He says to one of the reporting officers, "I'm up to my butt in gas."

== Novelization ==
A novelization of the film, written by Alexander Edwards, was published in 1974 by Warner Books (ISBN 978-0446764940). The novel was written before production began on the film, and there are subtle differences, such as McQ living in an apartment, rather than on a boat, was an ex Navy combat operator and using a Mauser in the climax, rather than a (grander) MAC-10 submachine gun. Some scenes are also deleted or modified, but, on the whole, the book is fairly true to the movie in both dialogue and plot.

== Reception ==
In a contemporary review, Arthur D. Murphy of Variety called the film "a good contemporary crime actioner" that was "extremely well cast. Coproducer Lawrence Roman's script has some good twists, turns and ironies, caught well by director John Sturges." Kevin Thomas of the Los Angeles Times compared McQ favorably to the recent Magnum Force (the sequel to Dirty Harry): "The most intriguing aspect of John Wayne's diverting but undistinguished new picture McQ at selected theaters is its similarity to Clint Eastwood's Magnum Force ... The difference—and it may be crucial—is that Wayne, blustering and bombastic as ever, dominates his film whereas it's violence for violence's sake that takes over Magnum Force. Eastwood's film looks lots more chic, but McQ has lots more humanity."

Gene Siskel of the Chicago Tribune gave the film two-and-a-half stars out of four and wrote: "Like so many of his recent movies, McQ would be nothing without Wayne. In fact, less than nothing, because though its story takes a high number of unexpected turns, the pacing is excruciatingly slow, its supporting characters excruciatingly vapid. And yet the film holds together around Wayne." Pauline Kael also criticized the pace, dismissing the film as "prostratingly dull", as did Nora Sayre of The New York Times, who wrote: "In this wildly undramatic picture, music and gunshots have to provide the gumption that the acting lacks. Surely Mr. Wayne should stick to Westerns: he's simply too slow to play any kind of policeman. Horseless in the streets of Seattle, he looks as though he needs a shot of sand." Gary Arnold of The Washington Post wrote: "McQ can be recommended if you're in the mood for a commercial movie so stiff and perfunctory that it becomes unintentionally funny ... Wayne really should have enough savvy to realize that he looks ridiculous speeding around town in a green Hornet. This sporty image doesn't do anything for him anymore than his toupee does."

Retrospectively, James M. Tate of Cult Film Freaks said the movie has a film noir quality: "Director John Sturges was, like Wayne, best known for making Westerns, a genre McQ borrows from with the maverick loner versus an eclectic string of feisty (and often sneaky) antagonists, each with their own lethal agenda, sometimes even coming out of the woodwork with guns blazing. But with the cool looking MAC-10 submachine gun and a snaky trail pitting one man against shadowy odds, this is really a modern Noir thriller providing a chance to see the American icon grittier, and often more vulnerable, than ever before: at least in a modern setting."

On review aggregator website Rotten Tomatoes, the film has an approval rating of 36% based on 11 reviews.

== See also ==
- John Wayne filmography
- List of American films of 1974
- Brannigan
