= Sierra de Órganos National Park =

National park in Sombrerete, Zacatecas, Mexico

- Parque Nacional Sierra de Órganos
- IUCN category II (national park)
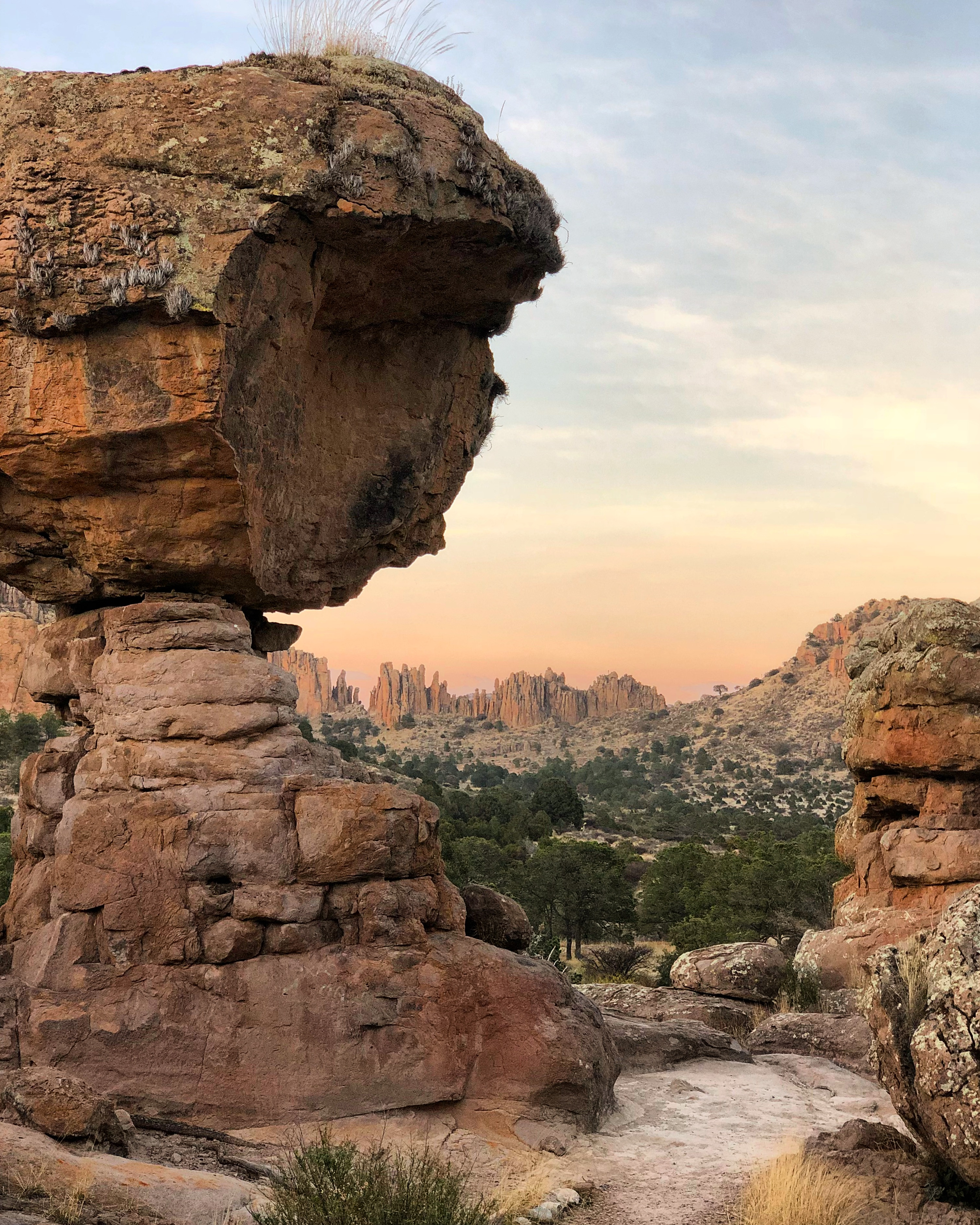
- Distinctive rock formations in Sierra de Órganos

- Location within Mexico
- Location: Sombrerete Municipality, Zacatecas, Mexico
- Nearest city: Sombrerete, Zacatecas
- Coordinates: 23°47′08″N 103°45′51″W
- Area: 1,125 hectares (2,780 acres)
- Established: November 27, 2000
- Governing body: Secretariat of Environment and Natural Resources
- World Heritage site

UNESCO World Heritage Site
- Official name: Sierra de Órganos (Mountain Range of Órganos)
- Type: Patrimonial
- Criteria: ii, iv
- Designated: 2010 (32nd session)
- Reference no.: 1351-043
- Region: Latin America and the Caribbean

Sierra de Órganos National Park (Spanish: Parque Nacional Sierra de Órganos) is a national park in Mexico, located in the northwest corner of the municipality of Sombrerete in the state of Zacatecas, near the border with Durango. The park is known for its diverse aridland ecosystem and towering rock formations of the Sierra Madre Occidental, which are reminiscent of organ pipe cacti or the pipes of the musical instrument, from which the park takes its name.

In addition to conifer forests in the highlands and xerophilous scrub in the lowlands, Sierra de Órganos is a refuge for several species of animals endemic to the region and others in danger of extinction. It is a popular area for recreation, including hiking and cycling, and for its scenery and landscapes.

== History ==
Sierra de Órganos National Park was created by federal decree on November 27, 2000. It is administered by Mexico's Secretariat of Environment and Natural Resources.

== Geography and climate ==
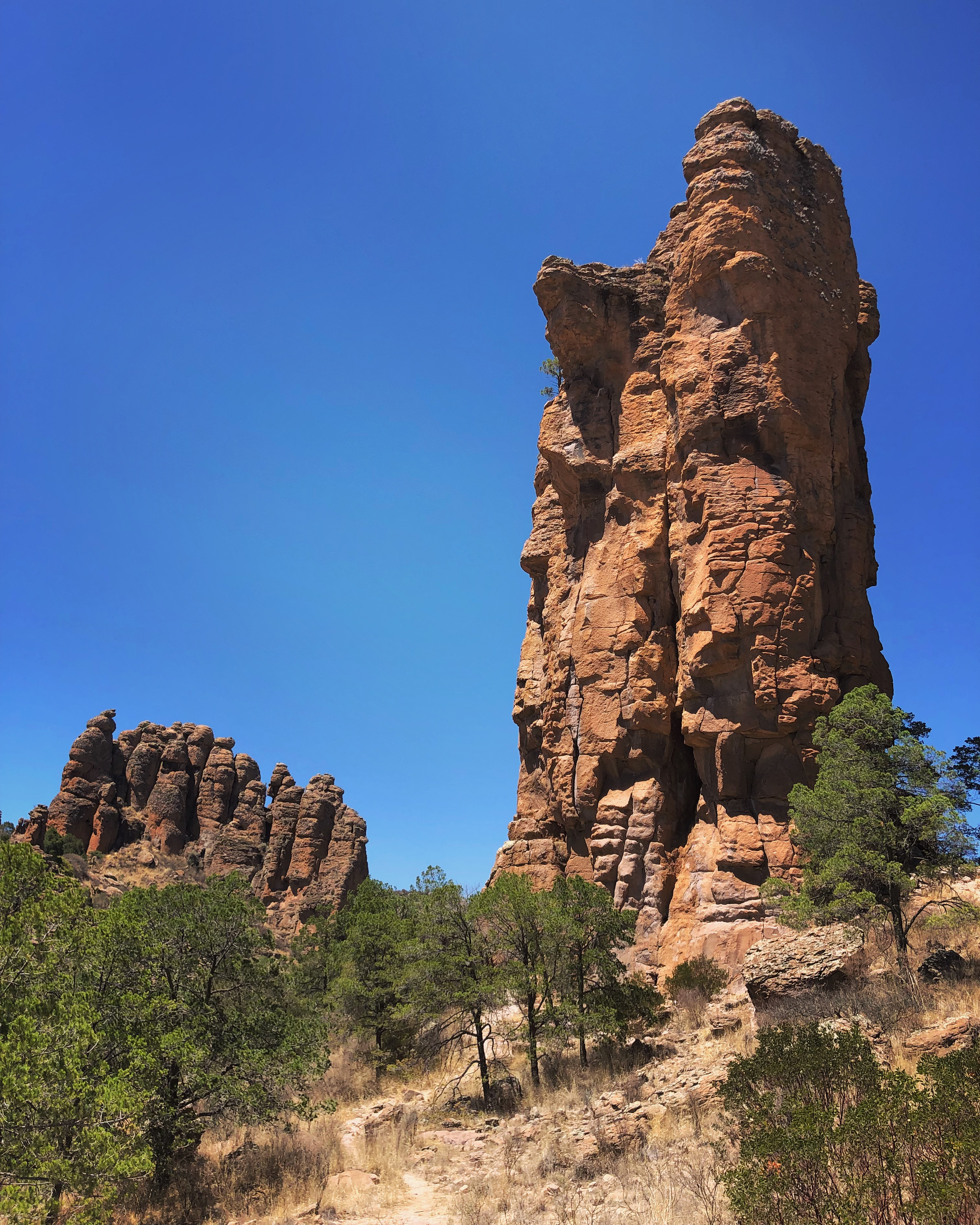
Rock formations.

The park covers a total area of 11.25 square kilometres (4.34 sq mi) on the northwestern edge of Zacatecas in the municipality of Sombrerete, approximately 21 kilometres (13 mi) northwest of the city of Sombrerete along Highway 45, which connects Zacatecas with the neighboring municipality of Vicente Guerrero in Durango. The park is about 8 kilometres (5.0 mi) northeast of the town of Villa Insurgentes, and 90 kilometres (56 mi) east of the city of Durango. A dirt road about 10 km in length provides access to the park from Highway 45.

Sierra de Órganos is nestled within the Sierra Madre Occidental mountain range, in an area that corresponds to the physiographic province of the Mexican Plateau. The topography is uneven, with elevations ranging from 2,120 to 2,560 metres (6,960 to 8,400 ft) above sea level. This gives rise to dramatic ridges and steep peaks that form small plateaus, often with very prominent, nearly vertical cliff faces. Small valleys surrounding the peaks afford scenic views of the rock formations from below.

The climate of the region is semi-arid; most precipitation occurs in the winter, and only scarcely in the summer. Temperatures can vary from warm to hot during the day and cool to cold at night.

== Flora and fauna ==
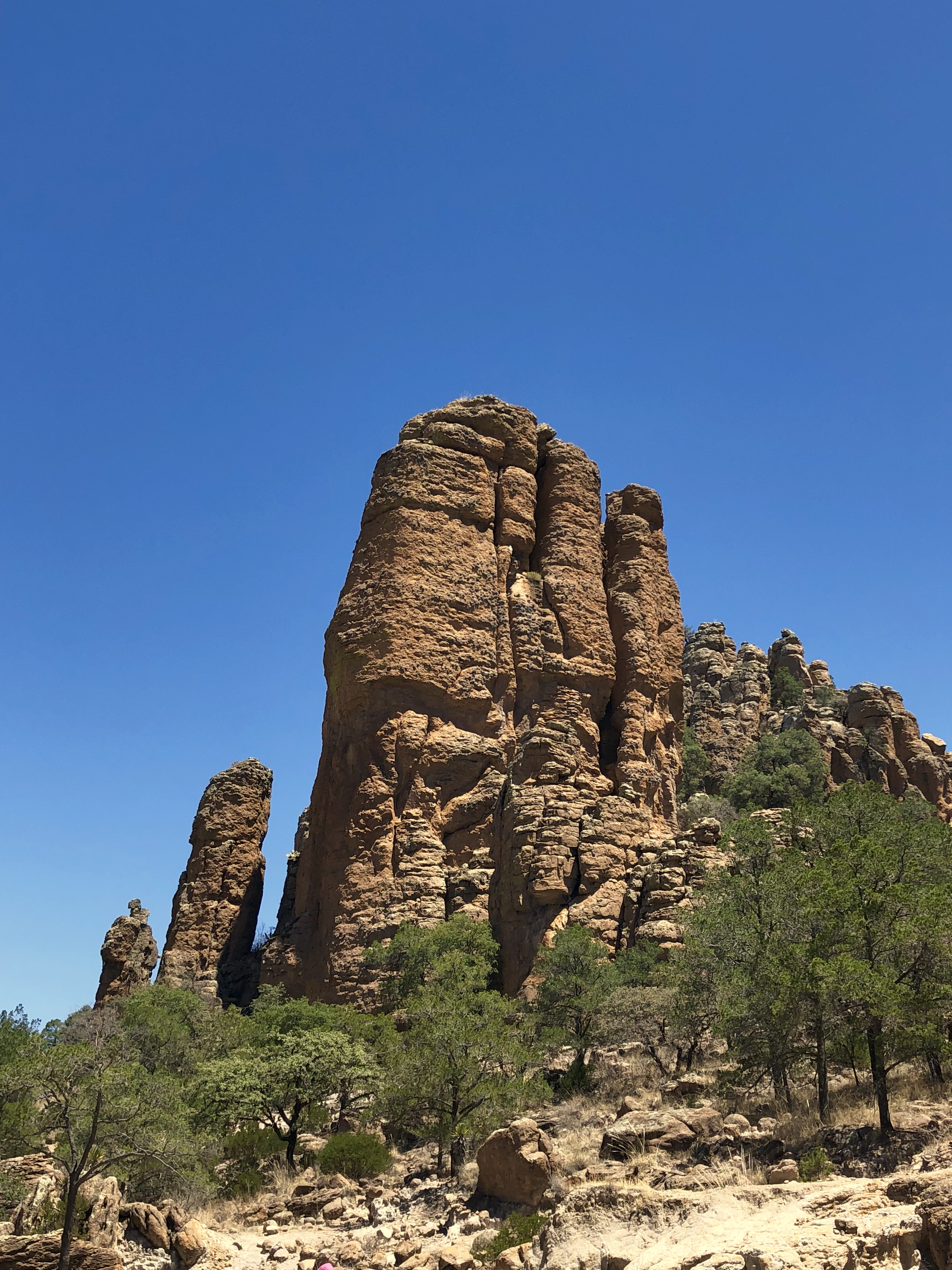
Pine-oak forest, mostly Pinus cembroides.

The park is a refuge for a great diversity of wildlife, including some plant and animal species which are locally endemic. Flora is characteristic of mixed pine-oak forests in the mountains, dominated by trees including the Pinus cembroides and encino, and of scrubby, arid grasslands at lower elevations. Other plants in the park include palms, ferns, huizache, maguey, nopal peach, nopal cork, oregano, manzanita, gatuña, jarilla, sotol, biznaga, guayabillo, capulín, tepozán, horse's brush, and wild onion.

Fauna is typical of the region as a whole. Species often observed in the park include the hare, raccoon, gray fox, cougar, coyote, collared peccary, opossum, badger, red lynx, white-tailed deer, mourning dove, white-winged dove, scaled quail, common calandria, and peregrine falcon. The cacomixtle, a small procyonid mammal, and the kit fox are endemic to and threatened in the area.

The biodiversity of the park faces many threats from the outside world. Several growing human settlements are very close to the park, many of which are dedicated to agriculture and livestock ranching and have caused serious deterioration of surrounding natural ecosystems in certain areas. The exploitation of local sand mines is also an issue. Despite these threats, many of the region's original ecosystems remain largely intact.

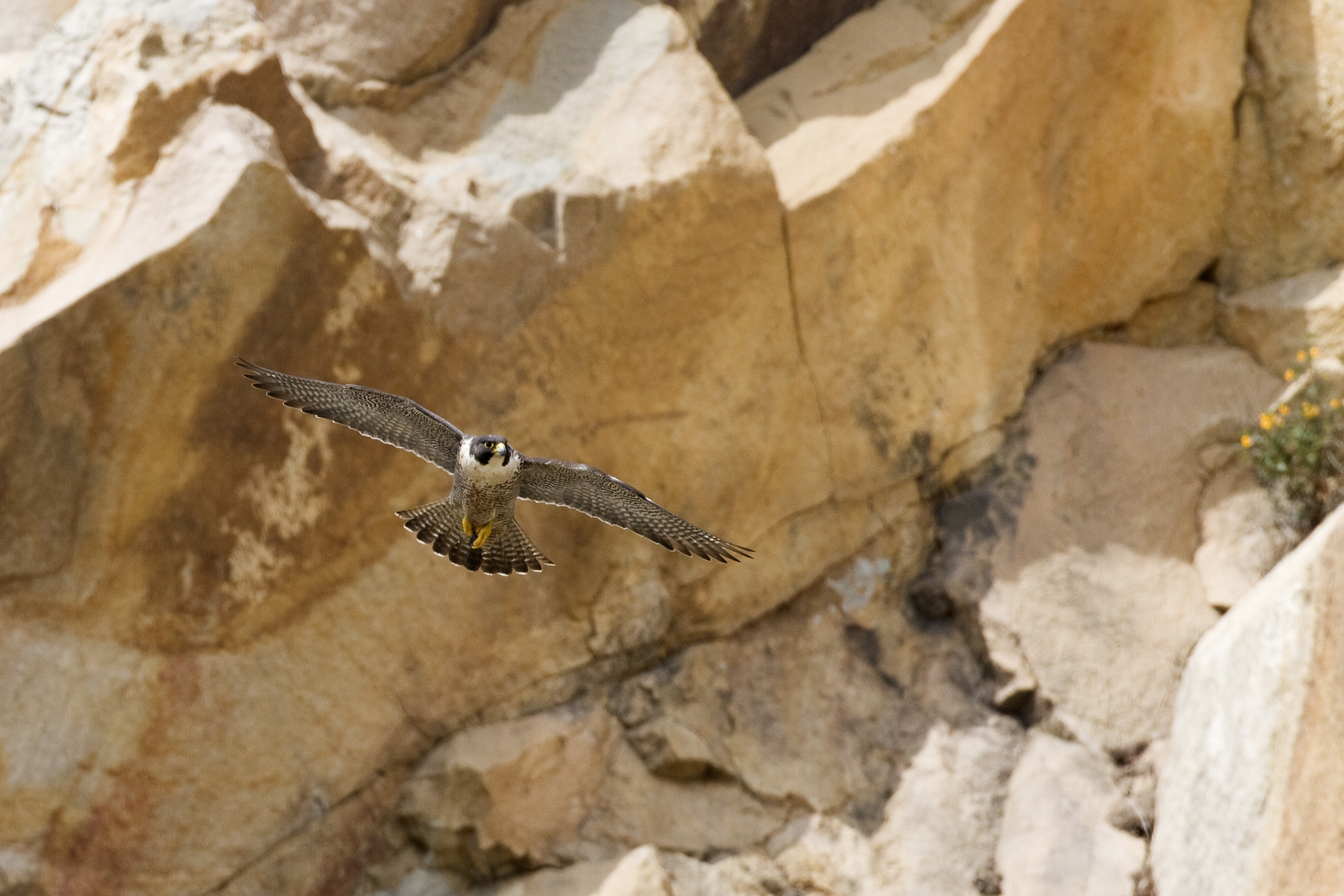
Peregrine falcon (Falco peregrinus)

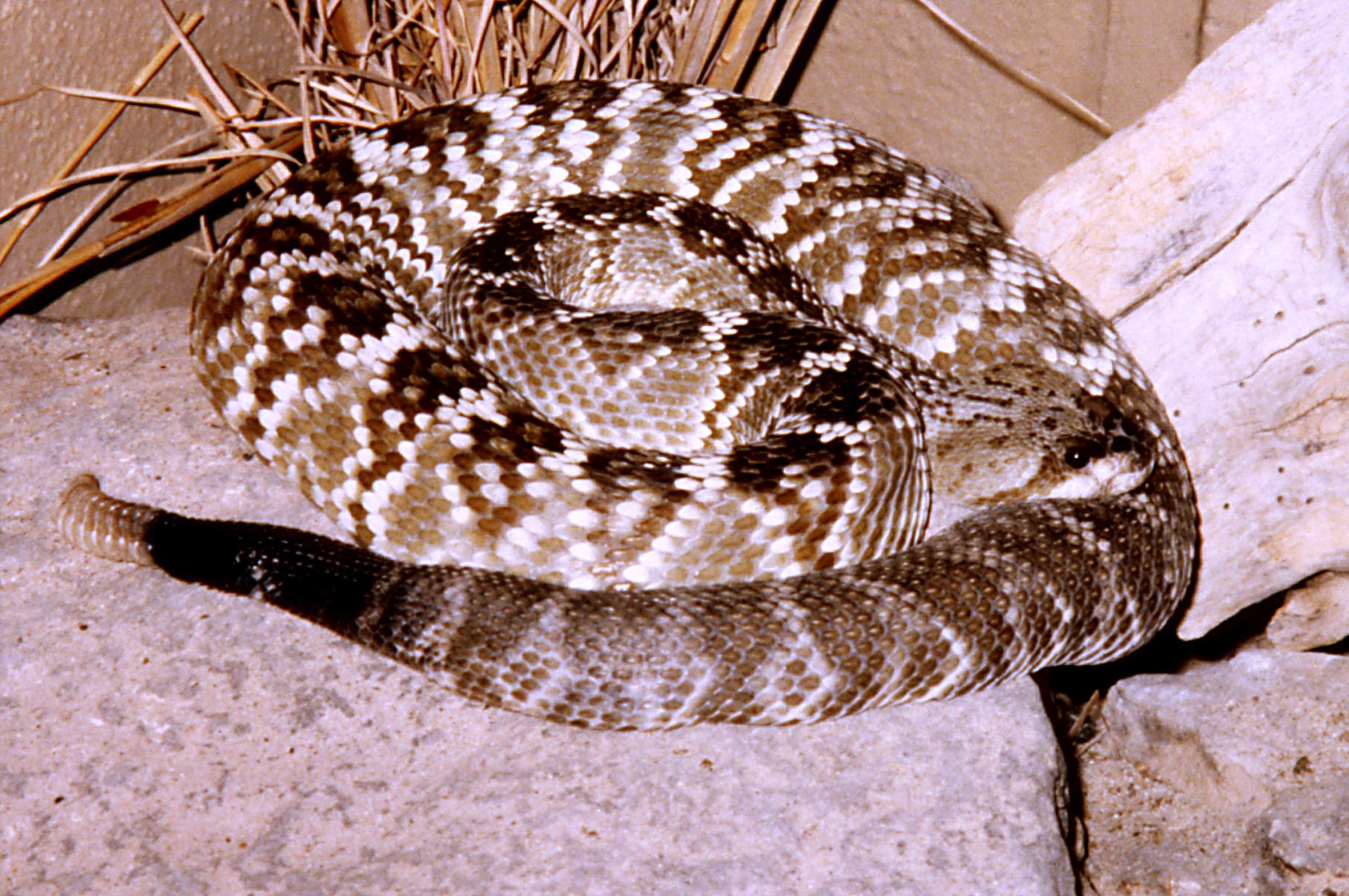
Black-tail rattlesnake (Crotalus molossus)

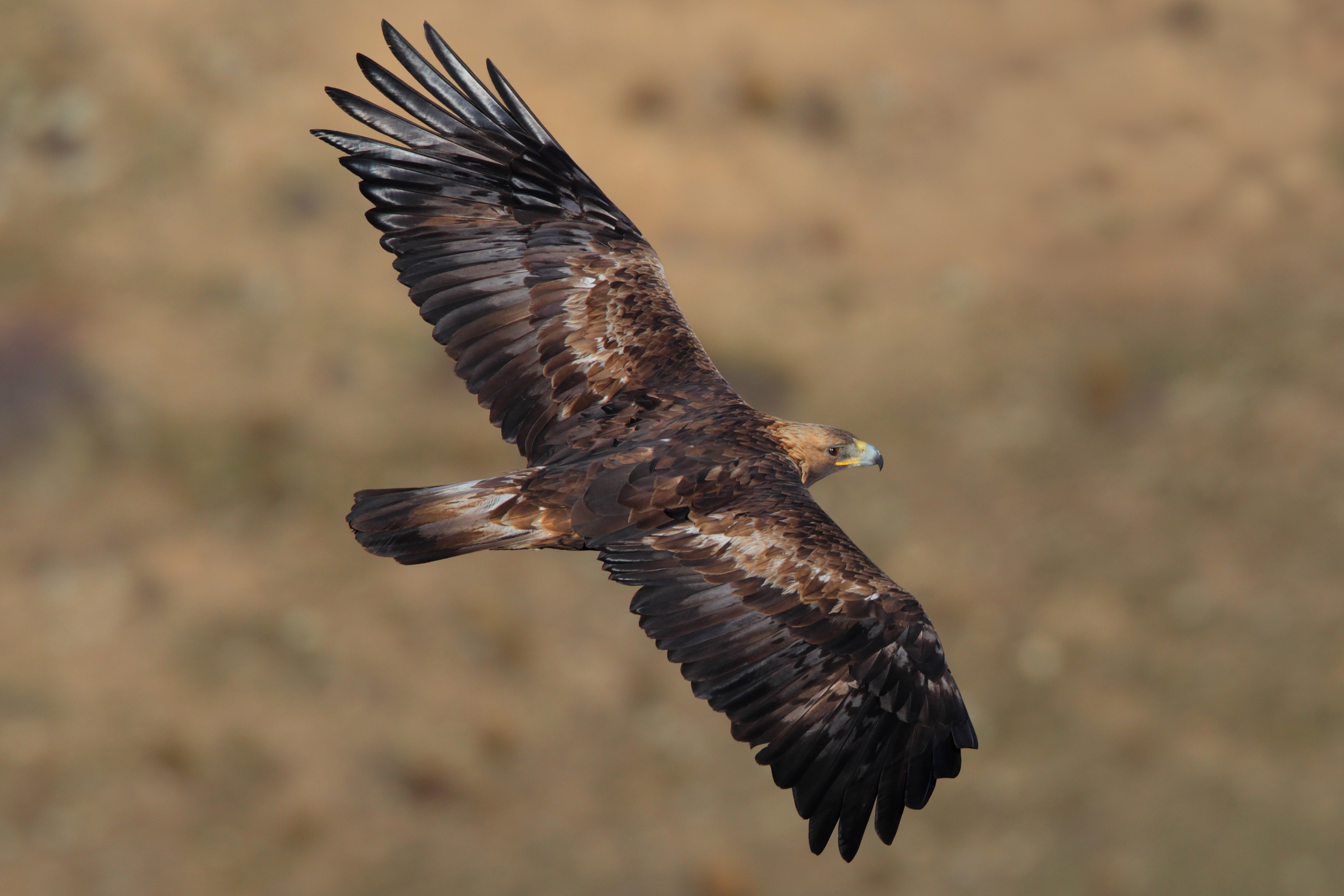
Golden eagle (Aquila chrysaetos)

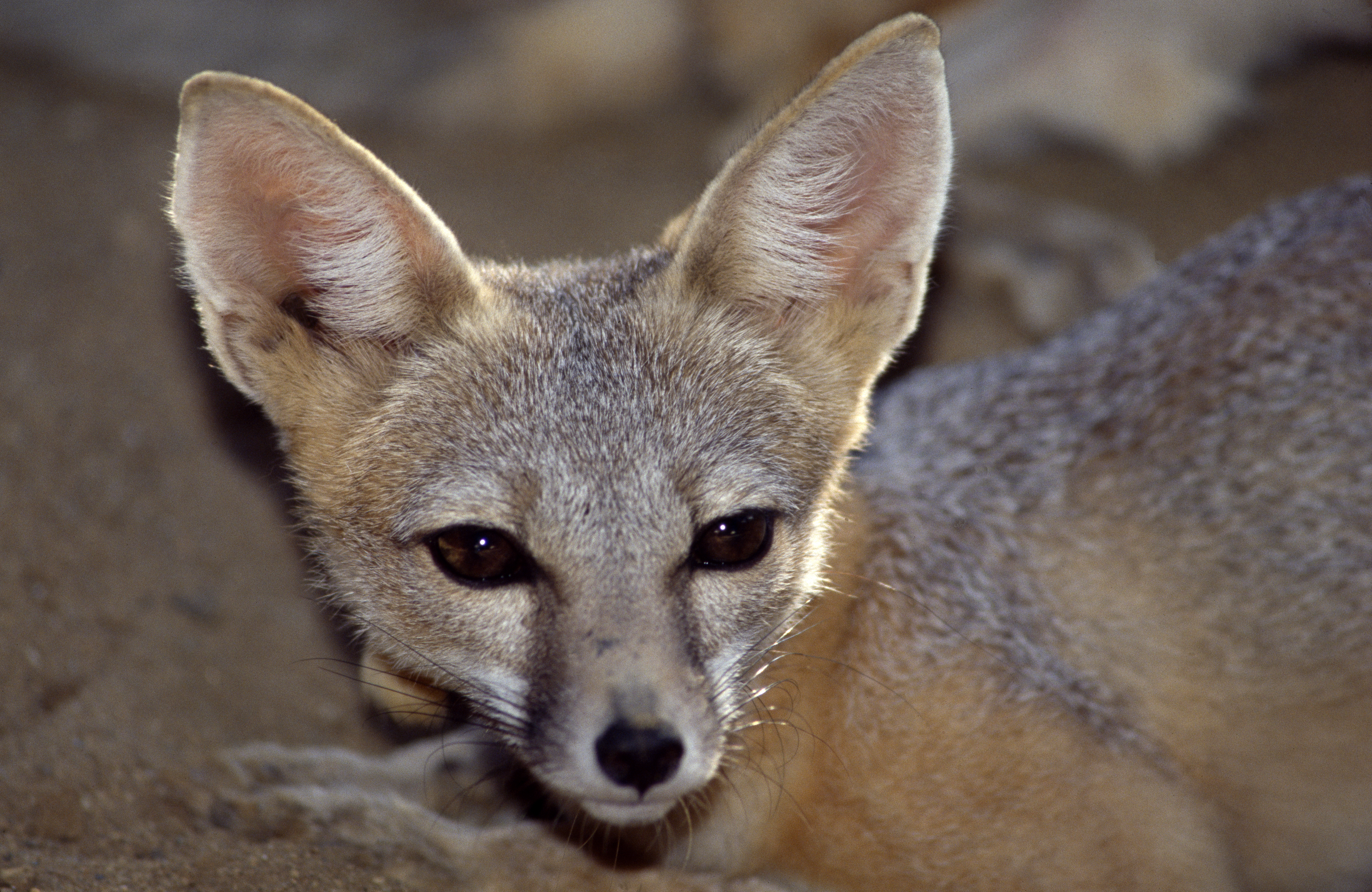
Kit fox (Vulpes macrotis)

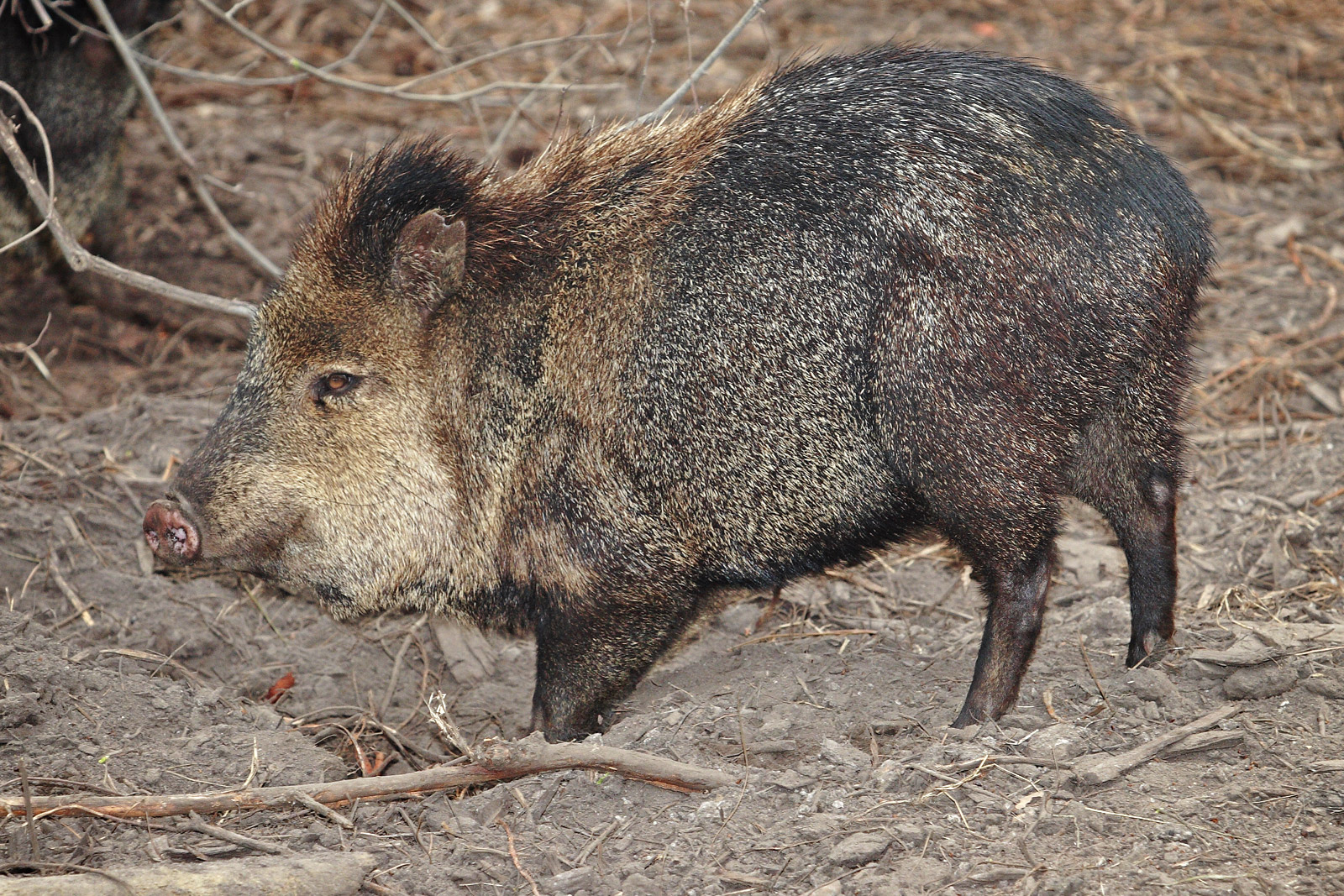
Collared peccary (Pecari tajacu)

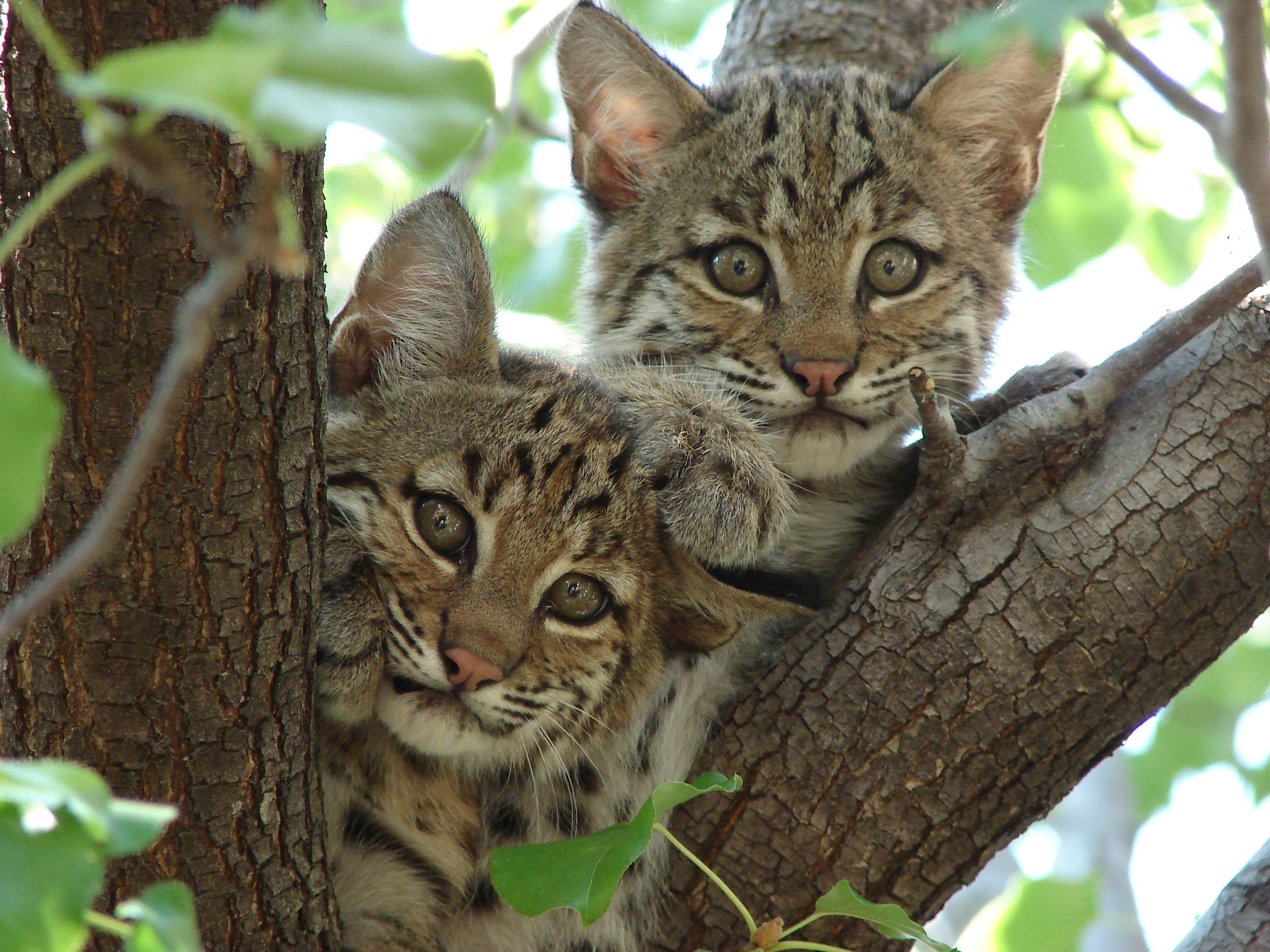
Bobcat (Lynx rufus)

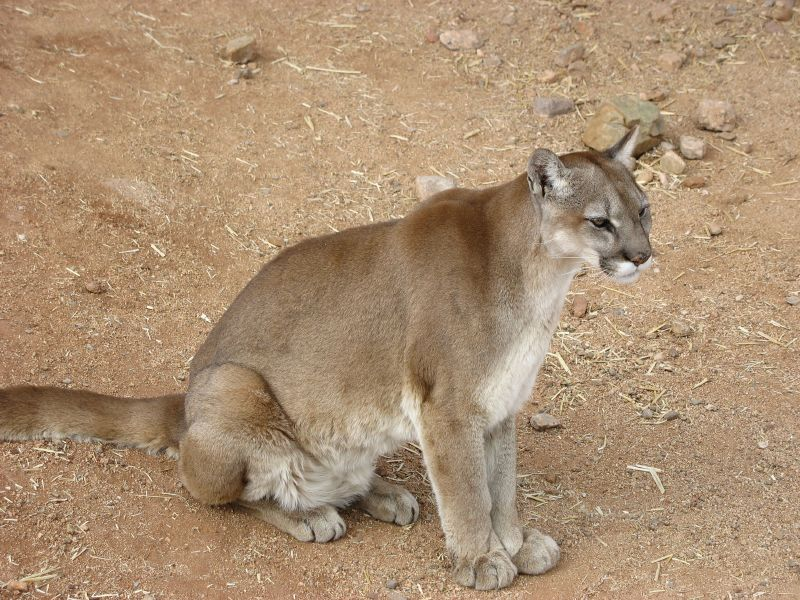
Cougar (Puma concolor)

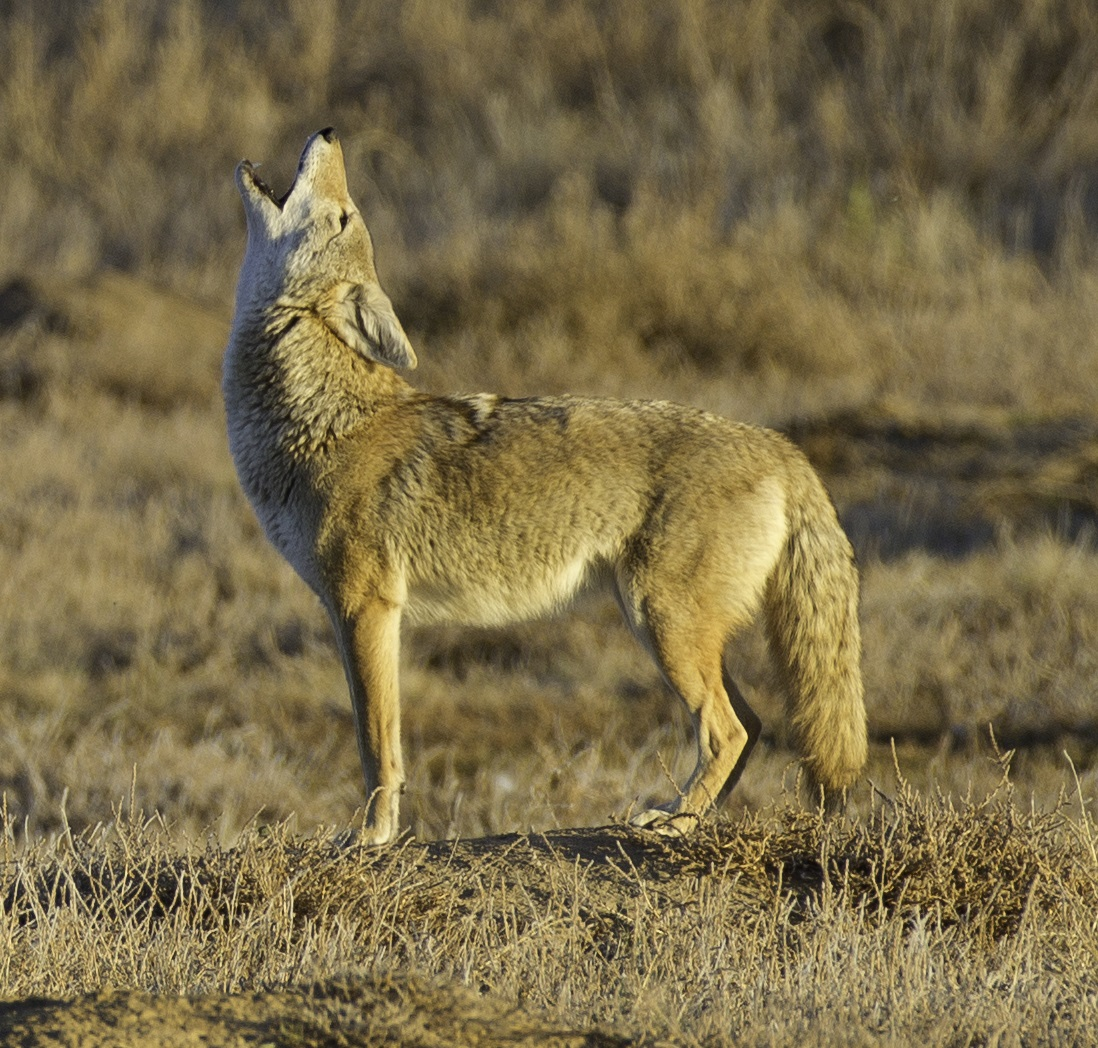
Coyote (Canis latrans)

== Recreation ==
Sierra de Órganos is frequented by nature lovers as well as extreme sports enthusiasts, as the steep peaks and slopes lend themselves to rock climbing. Hiking and cycling are also popular in the park. While some areas are suitable for camping, most of the park lacks basic services and provisions such as drinking water; these must be obtained in nearby villages. Access to the park requires paying a fee of 20 Mexican pesos per visitor.

Sierra de Órganos National Park

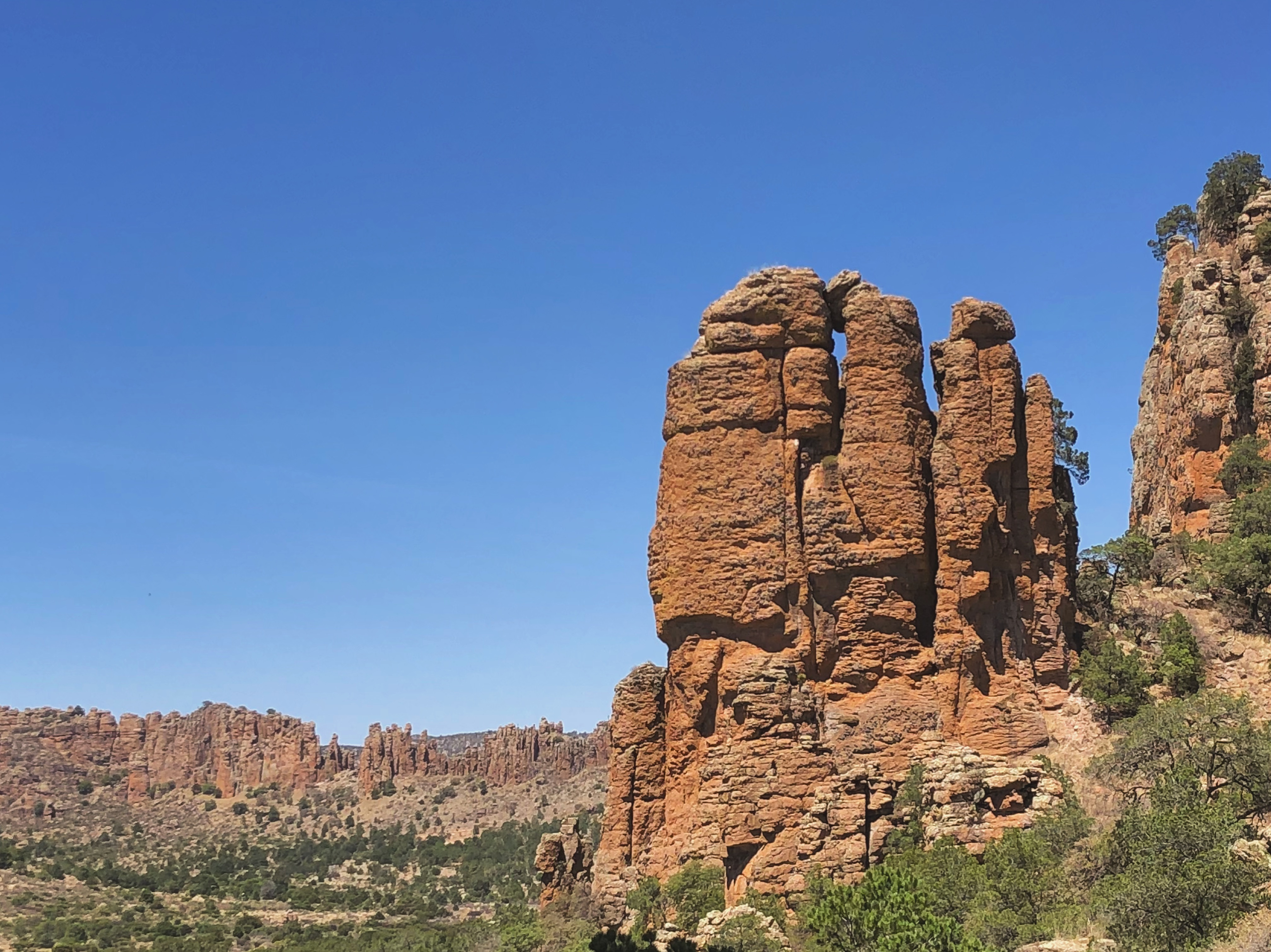

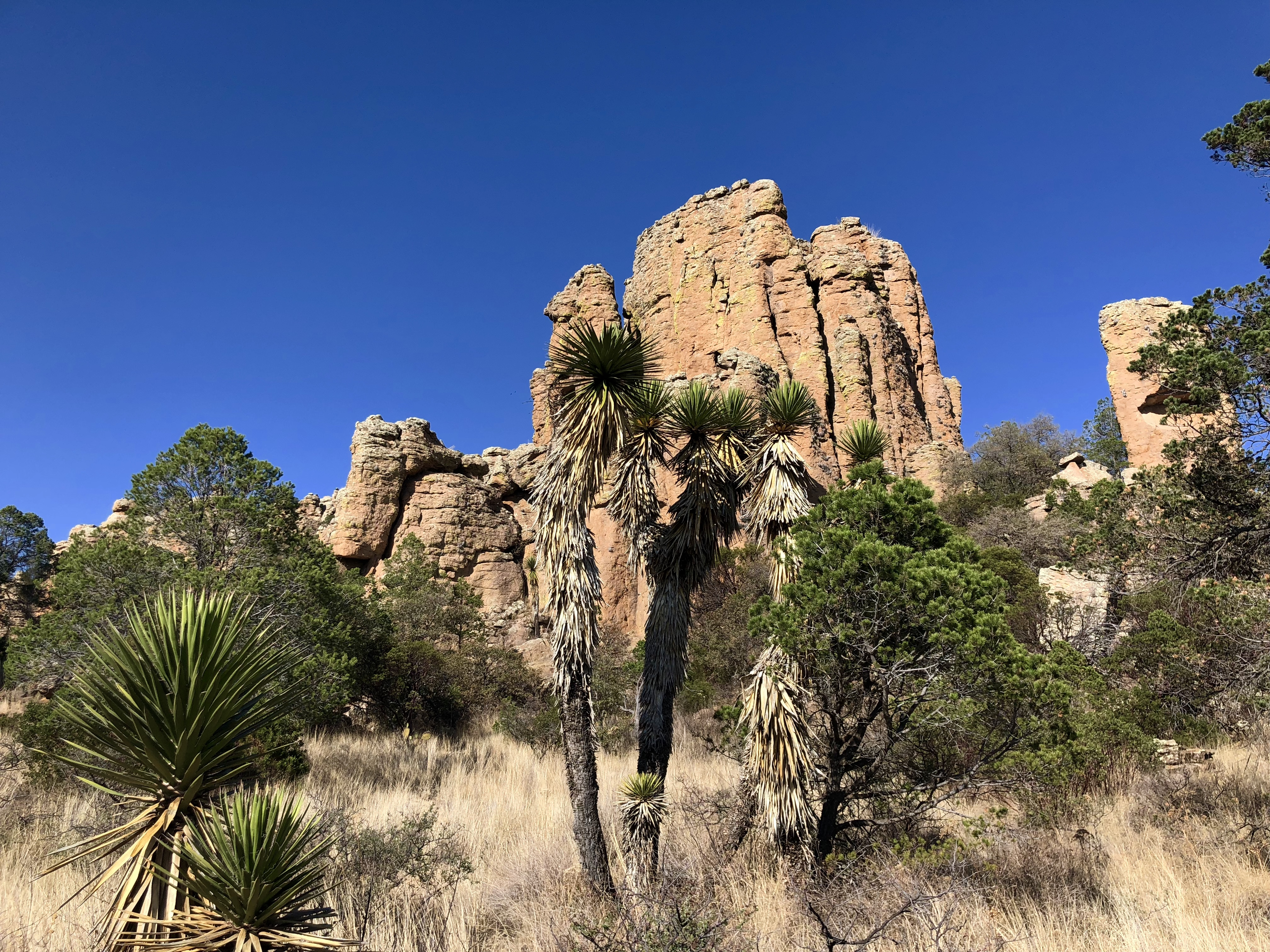

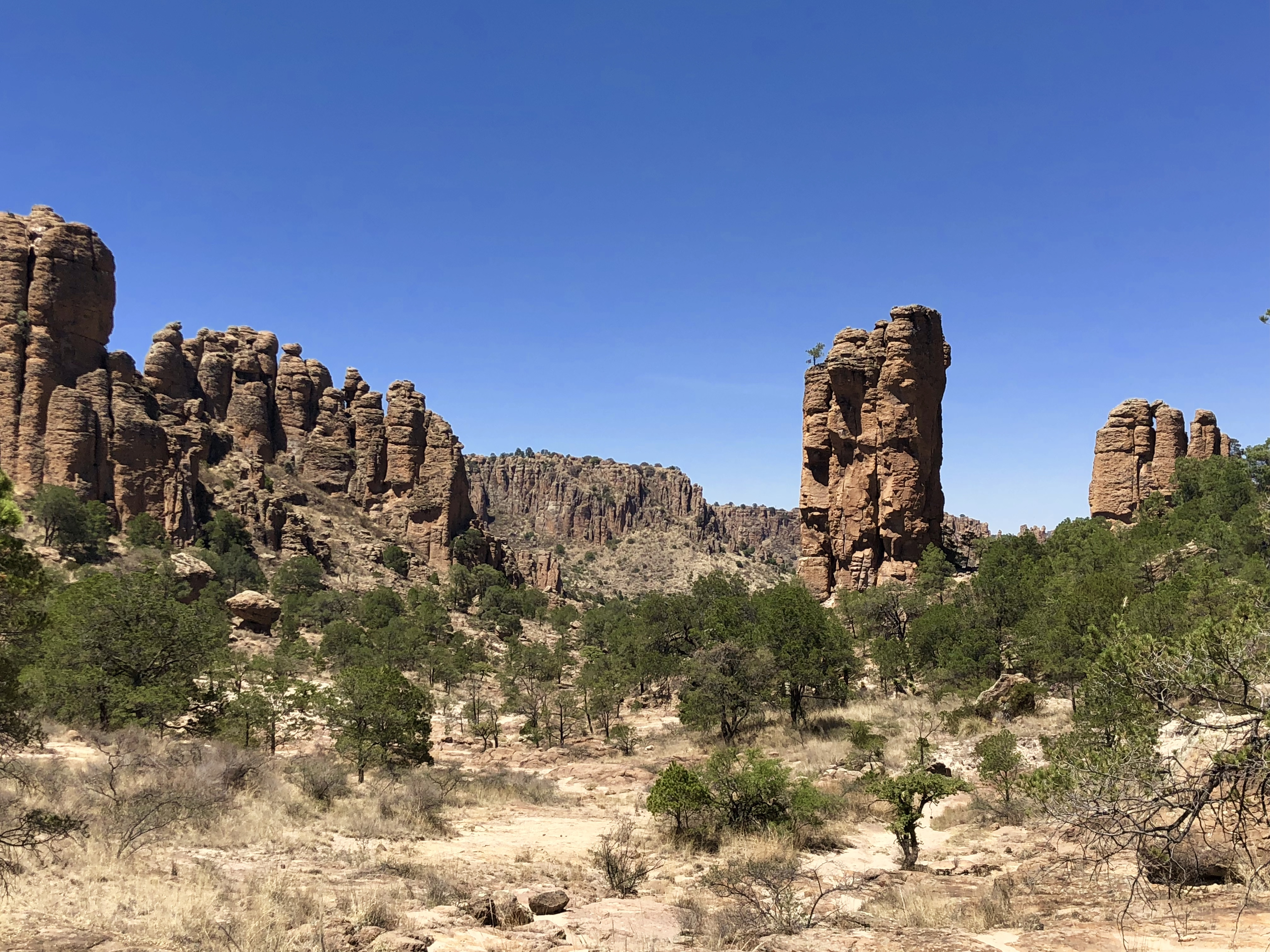

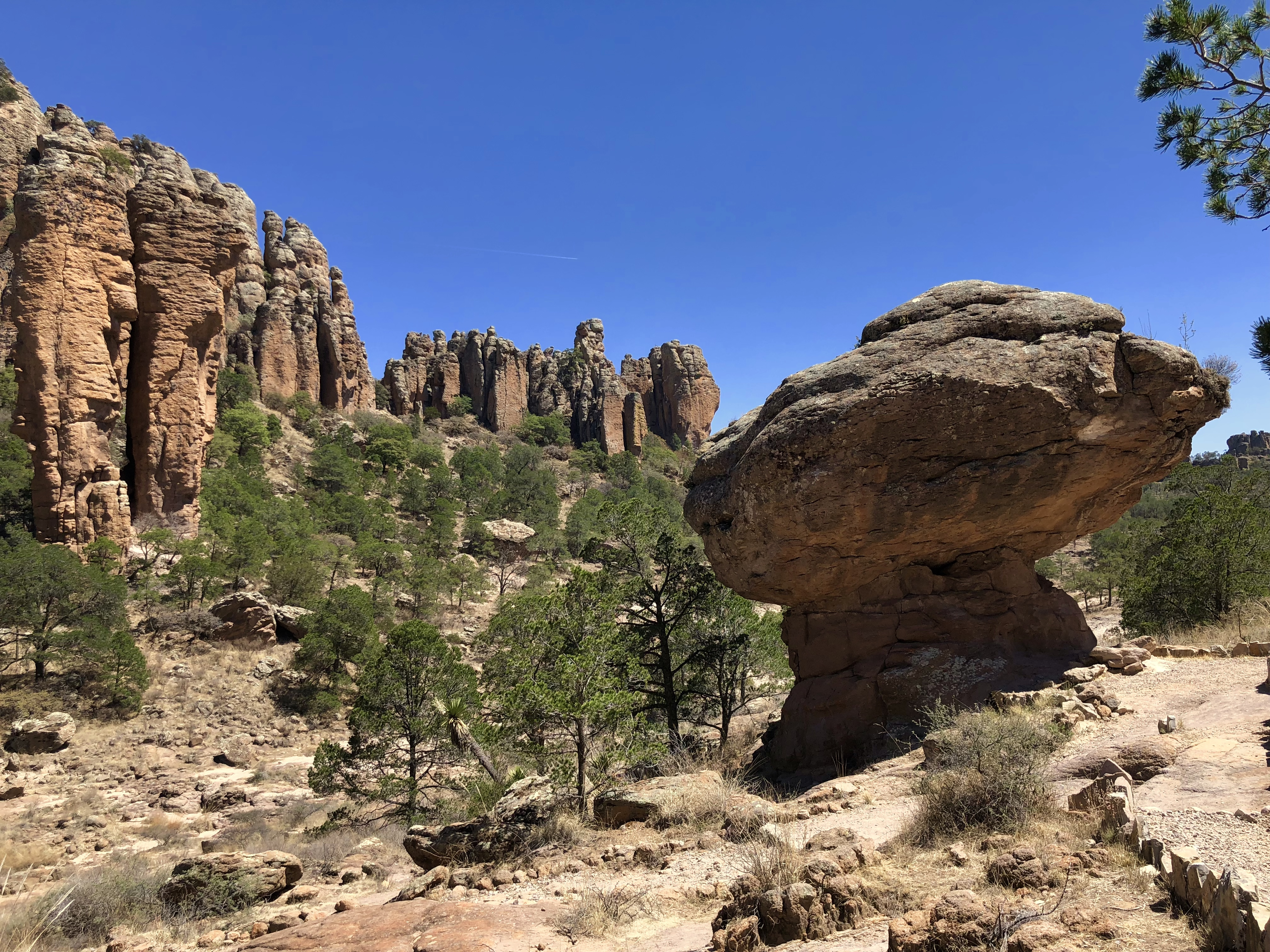

== Filming location ==
The park's scenic landscapes have been used as filming locations by American and Mexican directors, especially for western films in the 1950s, 1960s, and 1970s. Some of those films are:

- The Tall Men (film)
- These Thousand Hills
- La Cucaracha (1959 film)
- Geronimo (1962 film)
- Rage (1966 film)
- The War Wagon
- The Scalphunters
- Guns for San Sebastian
- The Undefeated (1969 film)
- Big Jake
- The Train Robbers
- Caveman (film)
- Revenge (1990 film)
- The Cisco Kid (1994 film)
- Wagons East
- One Man's Hero

== See also ==
- Sombrerete
- List of national parks of Mexico
