= Geronimo (1962 film) =

1962 film by Arnold Laven

- Theatrical release poster
- Directed by: Arnold Laven
- Written by: Pat Fielder, Arnold Laven
- Produced by: Arnold Laven; Arthur Gardner; Jules V. Levy
- Starring: Chuck Connors; Adam West; Denver Pyle; Armando Silvestre
- Cinematography: Alex Phillips
- Edited by: Marsh Hendry
- Music by: Hugo Friedhofer
- Color process: Technicolor
- Production company: Levy-Gardner-Laven
- Distributed by: Bedford Pictures Inc. United Artists
- Release date: May 1, 1962
- Running time: 101 minutes
- Country: United States
- Language: English
- Budget: $1 million

Geronimo is a 1962 American Western film made by Levy-Gardner-Laven and released by United Artists, starring Chuck Connors in the title role. The film was directed by Arnold Laven from a screenplay by Pat Fielder, filming took place in Sierra de Órganos National Park in the town of Sombrerete, Mexico.

The following year, Connors married his costar, Kamala Devi.

== Plot ==
The events leading up to the final surrender of Geronimo during the Apache-United States Wars in 1886.

== Cast ==
- Chuck Connors as Geronimo
- Kamala Devi as Teela
- Pat Conway as Captain William Maynard
- Armando Silvestre as Natchez
- Adam West as Lieutenant John Delahay
- Lawrence Dobkin as General George A. Crook
- Ross Martin as Mangas
- Denver Pyle as Senator Conrad
- Eduardo Noriega as Colonel Morales
- John Anderson as Jeremiah Burns
- Enid Jaynes as Huera
- Mario Navarro as Giantah
- Nancy Rodman as Mrs. Marsh
- Amanda Ames as Mrs. Burns
- Claudio Brook as Mr. Henry

== Production ==
In November 1957 the producing team of Arnold Laven, Arthur Gardner and Jules V. Levy announced they would make a film about Geronimo for their company, Gramercy Pictures, and release through United Artists. They hoped for Linda Darnell to play the female lead.

Following the completion of the film in 1961, the producers signed Connors to a two-picture contract.

== Reception ==
The film grossed $300,000 in Japan alone.

== See also ==
- List of American films of 1962
