= Arthur H. Nadel =

American film director (1921–1990)

- Born: April 25, 1921; New York City, U.S.
- Died: February 20, 1990; Los Angeles, California, U.S.
- Occupation: Film director
- Spouse: Adele

Arthur H. Nadel was an American film director and editor, who directed feature films and television episodes over the course of a multi-decade career in the industry.

== Filmography ==
=== Editor ===
- My Dear Secretary
- Impact (1949 film)
- D.O.A. (1950 film)
- The Jackie Robinson Story
- Chicago Calling
- Without Warning!
- Vice Squad (1953 film)
- Sabre Jet
- Omnibus (American TV program) (2 episodes)
- Adventures of the Falcon (4 episodes)
- No Place to Hide (1956 film)
- Kiss of Fire (film)
- Snowfire
- Death Valley Days (14 episodes)
- The Littlest Hobo (film)

=== Director ===
- The Rifleman (9 episodes)
- Arrest and Trial (2 episodes)
- The United States Steel Hour (1 episode)
- The Virginian (TV series) (1 episode)
- The Big Valley (4 episodes)
- Daniel Boone (1964 TV series) (1 episode)
- Clambake
- Hondo (TV series) (1 episode)
- The Young Rebels (1 episode)
- Underground
- The High Chaparral (1 episode)
- Bonanza (2 episodes)
- Lassie (1954 TV series) (2 episodes)
- Banyon (1 episode)
- The Streets of San Francisco (3 episodes)
- Chase (1973 TV series) (4 episodes)
- Shazam! (5 episodes)
- The Secrets of Isis (3 episodes)
- ABC Weekend Special (1 episode)
- Space Academy (2 episodes)
- Jason of Star Command (28 episodes)
- The Kid Super Power Hour with Shazam!
- Fat Albert and the Cosby Kids (3 episodes)
