= Arnold Laven =

American film director

- Born: February 3, 1922; Chicago, Illinois, U.S.
- Died: September 13, 2009 (aged 87); Tarzana, California, U.S.
- Occupations: Television and motion picture director and producer
- Spouse: Wallace Earl Laven (1951-his death)

Arnold Laven (February 3, 1922 – September 13, 2009) was an American film and television director and producer. He was one of the founders and principals of the American film and television production company Levy-Gardner-Laven. Laven was a producer of, among other things, the western television series The Rifleman and The Big Valley. He also directed motion pictures, including Without Warning!, The Rack, The Monster That Challenged the World, Geronimo, Rough Night in Jericho, and Sam Whiskey. In the 1970s and early 1980s, Laven directed dozens of episodes of television series, including episodes of Mannix, The A-Team, Hill Street Blues, The Six Million Dollar Man, Fantasy Island, The Rockford Files and CHiPs.

== Early years ==
Laven was born in Chicago, Illinois, and moved to Los Angeles with his family in the late 1930s. He got his start in the entertainment business working as a mail room messenger at Warner Bros.

== First Motion Picture Unit ==
During World War II, Laven was assigned to the U.S. Army Air Forces' First Motion Picture Unit, the first unit of the United States military to be made up entirely of motion picture personnel. The unit made training films from 1942–1945 at the old Hal Roach motion picture lot. Laven later recalled that the films they made were not "phony" Hollywood war films: "They had to be approved by the higher-ups in the Air Force. They had to be technically accurate in every possible way." The unit included actors George Montgomery, Arthur Kennedy, Alan Ladd, William Holden, and DeForest Kelley. Army Capt. Ronald Reagan was the unit's personnel officer. Laven recalled that the men liked and respected Reagan, noting, "He was always a very warm, cordial, and pleasant man."

Laven described the First Motion Picture Unit as "the best film school in the world," because participants learned all aspects of the movie industry. He even had the opportunity to work briefly in front of the camera as an extra in the pilot training short, Live and Learn.

== Post-war years ==
After the war, Laven continued to work in the motion picture business, holding jobs as a script supervisor, dialogue director, and film press agent. He worked on such films as William Wyler's The Best Years of Our Lives and Fred Zinnemann's Teresa.

== 1950s ==
In September 1951, Laven formed a production company with Jules V. Levy and Arthur Gardner, both of whom he had met while working in the First Motion Picture Unit. The company, which eventually became Levy-Gardner-Laven, was initially called "Allart Pictures, Inc." The company opened offices at Goldwyn studios and announced plans to begin casting on their first feature, Without Warning!, a thriller about a psychopathic killer on the loose. Laven directed, and Adam Williams was cast as a gardener who murdered women with his garden shears. Operating on a shoe-string budget, the film was shot on the streets of Los Angeles—on the Hollywood Freeway, in Chavez Ravine, at the Produce Terminal, and plant nurseries, cocktail bars, and taxi offices. On seeing the end product, the Los Angeles Times reported that Laven and his partners had "succeeded in parlaying a $15,000 investment into a film production that is likely to gross well over $1,000,000, so decisive is its merit."

In May 1952, Hedda Hopper announced the arrival of the new team as follows:

"THREE FELLOWS, Jules Levy, Arthur Gardner and Arnold Laven, met in the army in World War II. Recently they got together to make a picture 'Without Warning.' Though it cost less than $100,000, Sol Lesser saw it and was so impressed that he bought an interest in it and arranged for its release. Then he put the trio under contract to make two pictures annually for three years."

The trio's second feature was Vice Squad, a 1953 detective drama directed by Laven and starring Edward G. Robinson and Adam Williams.

The third feature, Down Three Dark Streets, was another semidocumentary-style film noir starring Broderick Crawford as an FBI agent. The film's climax took place around the Hollywood Sign. A newspaper review of the 1954 film noted the promise of the three young producers:

"'Down Three Dark Streets' is the third film of the young trio composed of Arthur Gardner, Jules V. Levy and Arnold Laven. The three, all under thirty-five, laid plans for their production company while they were serving in the army in World War II. Their previous pictures as a team, 'Without Warning' and 'Vice Squad,' were critical and boxoffice successes."

In 1956, Laven went out on his own to direct The Rack, a drama starring Paul Newman and Lee Marvin about a soldier who is court-martialed for collaborating with the enemy after spending two years in a North Korean prison camp. The film was based on a United States Steel Hour program written by Rod Serling.

In 1957, Levy-Gardner-Laven team turned their focus to the popular science fiction and monster genres. Laven received directing and producing credits on The Monster That Challenged the World, a feature about an army of giant mollusks that emerge from the Salton Sea in California's Imperial Valley. A review in the Los Angeles Times called the film "distinctly chilling," noted that "Laven never lets the tension slacken," and described the plot as follows:

"An earthquake opens a deep crevice under the Salton Sea and salt water, perhaps aided by atomic radiation, hatches long buried eggs of the phylum Mollusca. ... [T]hese sea-going prehistoric cousins ... leave silvery, smeary tracks, are as long as giraffes, as hungry as Great Danes and about as kindly disposed as panthers. Fortunately, as good snails, they don't get around too speedily; unfortunately, as good snails, they can lay about 3000 eggs in their brief life cycle."

The trio followed with a pair of vampire movies, The Vampire, a 1957 release about a small-town doctor who mistakenly ingests an experimental drug made from the blood of vampire bats, and The Return of Dracula, a 1958 feature about a vampire who murders a Czech artist, assumes his identity, and moves to the United States.

In the late 1950s, Laven also directed Slaughter on Tenth Avenue (1957), a crime drama set on the docks starring Richard Egan and Walter Matthau, and Anna Lucasta (1958), a feature starring an all-African American cast that included Eartha Kitt and Sammy Davis Jr.

== The Rifleman and other westerns ==
In 1957, Laven and his partners were collaborating with young screenwriter, Sam Peckinpah, on an episode of Zane Grey Theater when Laven came up with the concept for The Rifleman. Looking for a hook to separate the idea from other westerns, Laven suggested that they focus on the relationship between the rifle-toting settler and his son. Laven recalled that he was "inspired by his own relationship with his son, Larry, and told writer Sam Peckinpah to develop a father-son relationship." The Rifleman, with former professional baseball and basketball player Chuck Connors in the lead role, proved to be Laven's biggest success. The series ran from 1958 through 1963 and became one of the most successful television series of the 1960s.

With the success of The Rifleman, the Levy-Gardner-Laven team devoted much of their efforts in the 1960s to the western genre. During the 1959–1960 television season, they produced Law of the Plainsman, a western television series starring Michael Ansara as an Apache Indian who attends Harvard University and then returns west as a Deputy US Marshal in New Mexico. The character was spun off from a couple of episodes of The Rifleman in which Ansara's character was introduced to viewers.

Laven developed a friendship with Rifleman star Chuck Connors. In 1962, Laven cast Connors in the title role of the biographical film, Geronimo, which Laven directed and produced.

After The Rifleman left the air, Laven returned to the western genre as the executive producer of the long-running western television series, The Big Valley. The series starred Barbara Stanwyck and was broadcast by ABC from 1965 to 1969. Laven was responsible for casting Lee Majors as Stanwyck's step-son, predicting big things for the young actor: "It's his first appearance before a camera and I'll go on record as saying he's one of the most attractive male stars to come along in years."

Laven's association with the genre extended into a string of feature films. His directing credits in the western genre included The Glory Guys, a 1965 feature written by Sam Peckinpah about George Armstrong Custer and his 7th Cavalry Regiment, and Rough Night in Jericho, a 1967 western film starring Dean Martin, George Peppard, and Jean Simmons.

In 1968, Laven became one of the first directors to be confronted with cutting a scene under the newly introduced MPAA ratings system. The film was Sam Whiskey, a western directed by Laven and starring Burt Reynolds and Angie Dickinson as characters trying to recover $250,000 in gold bars from a steamboat wreck. The film as submitted by Laven to the MPAA included "a bare-from-the-waist-up shot" of Angie Dickinson. When faced with the prospect of an "R" rating (at the time an entirely new concept), Laven substituted a tighter shot of Dickinson from the shoulders up to avoid the "R" rating.

During the late 1960s and early 1970s, the Levy-Gardner-Laven team also remained active as producers on such films as Clambake, a 1967 Elvis Presley musical co-starring Shelley Fabares, The Scalphunters, a 1968 western directed by Sydney Pollack and starring Burt Lancaster, Ossie Davis and Telly Savalas, and Kansas City Bomber, a 1972 drama starring Raquel Welch as a roller derby athlete.

Laven was presented one of the Golden Boot Awards in 1992 for his contributions to western cinema.

== Television directing ==
Laven was also active for more than 30 years as a director of episodic television. His television directing credits included episodes of such series as The Rifleman (21 episodes), Mannix (8 episodes), The Greatest American Hero (7 episodes), The A-Team (6 episodes), The Big Valley (6 episodes), The Secrets of Isis (6 episodes), Eight Is Enough (5 episodes), Hill Street Blues (3 episodes), The Six Million Dollar Man (3 episodes), Planet of the Apes (3 episodes), Fantasy Island (2 episodes), The Rockford Files (2 episodes), Police Woman (2 episodes), Ironside (2 episodes), and CHiPs (2 episodes).

== Death ==
On September 13, 2009, Laven died from complications of pneumonia at the Tarzana Medical Center in the San Fernando Valley. He was survived by his wife, the former Wallace Earl Sparks, a daughter and a son. Laven and his wife had been married since 1951.
