= Arthur Gardner (producer) =

American actor and film producer

- Born: Arthur Goldberg; June 7, 1910; Marinette, Wisconsin, U.S.
- Died: December 19, 2014 (aged 104); Beverly Hills, California, U.S.
- Occupations: film producer, actor
- Years active: 1930–1982

Arthur Gardner (born Arthur Goldberg; June 7, 1910 – December 19, 2014) was an American actor and film producer. He was known for his television western, The Rifleman. He was a voting member of the Academy of Motion Picture Arts and Sciences.

== Early life ==
Gardner was born Arthur Goldberg in Marinette, Wisconsin, and raised in an upper-middle-class Jewish family. He started his show business career as an actor when he was 18 years old. In 1929, he arrived in Hollywood, where Carl Laemmle employed him as an extra for the film studio Universal. One of his first roles was as a student in 1930's All Quiet on the Western Front. He was the last surviving member of the cast and crew. Gardner and Luise Rainer were in 1938's Dramatic School, and, up until his death two weeks before Rainer, were the last two surviving members, both at the age of 104.

During World War II, Gardner served in the Army Air Forces' First Motion Picture Unit in Culver City, California. Like many Jewish actors at the time, he changed his name because of fears of anti-Semitism. There he met Jules Levy and Arnold Laven. The three formed the Levy-Gardner-Laven production company in 1951. Gardner's producing credits include the television series The Rifleman (1958–1963) and The Big Valley (1965–1969). His feature film credits include 1974's McQ and 1975's Brannigan, both starring John Wayne.

== Personal life ==
Gardner lived in Beverly Hills, California from 1963 until his death there on December 19, 2014, at the age of 104.

== See also ==
- List of centenarians (actors, filmmakers and entertainers)
