= Jules Levy (producer) =

American film producer

- Born: February 12, 1923; Los Angeles, CA
- Died: May 24, 2003 (aged 80); Los Angeles, CA
- Occupation: producer
- Years active: 1940–1977
- Spouse(s): Shirley Levy; Enid Jaynes

Jules Victor Levy (February 12, 1923 – May 24, 2003) was an American television and film producer. Levy's television series include The Rifleman, The Detectives, and The Big Valley.

== Early years ==
Jules Levy was the son of Joseph L. Levy, a real estate broker, and Bessie Levy. He was raised in Beverly Hills and joined the U.S. Army Air Forces to fight in World War II, serving in the First Motion Picture Unit.

== Producing ==
While serving under Ronald Reagan at Culver City's Hal Roach Studios, Levy met Arthur Gardner and Arnold Laven, and the three men formed a production company, Levy-Gardner-Laven. Serving in various producer capacities from the early 1940s to the mid-1970s, Levy was involved with such films as the 1967 Elvis Presley musical Clambake.

Though he produced over 30 films in the course of his career, Levy is best known for his involvement in the hit television programs The Rifleman, The Big Valley, and The Detectives.

== Death ==
Levy died in his Los Angeles home following an extended illness. He was 80. He is buried in Hillside Memorial Park Cemetery, Los Angeles (Garden of Abraham).
