= Jim Boles =

American actor

- Jim Boles in The Monkees 1966
- Born: February 28, 1914; Lubbock, Texas, U.S.
- Died: May 26, 1977 (aged 63); Sherman Oaks, California, U.S.
- Education: Fairfax High School; Los Angeles Junior College
- Occupation: Actor
- Years active: 1949–1977
- Spouse(s): Athena Lorde (m. 1942; died 1973)
- Children: 3

Jim Boles (February 28, 1914 – May 26, 1977) was an American actor.

== Early life and career ==
Born in Lubbock, Texas, Boles attended Fairfax High School and Los Angeles Junior College.

He appeared in the films The Tattooed Stranger, The Man with My Face, Naked in the Sun, Fluffy, The Ghost and Mr. Chicken, The Trouble with Angels, A Big Hand for the Little Lady, Waterhole No. 3, With Six You Get Eggroll, Angel in My Pocket, The Love God?, Ace Eli and Rodger of the Skies, Doctor Death: Seeker of Souls, Nightmare Honeymoon, Jacqueline Susann's Once Is Not Enough, and The Great Texas Dynamite Chase, among others.

Boles also appeared in a number of television shows, including nine episodes of the televised version of the radio series One Man's Family. Other appearances occurred on notable programs such as The Phil Silvers Show, The United States Steel Hour, Robert Montgomery Presents, Rocky King Detective, Have Gun – Will Travel, Naked City, Cheyenne, The Twilight Zone, The Lucy Show, The Dick Powell Theatre, McHale's Navy, Profiles in Courage, Daniel Boone, Rawhide, The Alfred Hitchcock Hour, Perry Mason, Bob Hope Presents the Chrysler Theatre, Lost in Space, The Man from U.N.C.L.E., Bonanza, The Big Valley, The Monkees, Get Smart, The Virginian, The Guns of Will Sonnett, Mod Squad, Marcus Welby, M.D., The F.B.I., Gunsmoke, Love, American Style, Night Gallery, Adam-12, Barnaby Jones, Cannon, Mannix, Days of Our Lives, The Odd Couple, Kung Fu, The Streets of San Francisco, Quincy, M.E., The Name of the Game, A Man Called Shenandoah, The Eleventh Hour, Hawaiian Eye, Bronco, Adventures in Paradise, Temple Houston, The Defenders, The Jackie Gleason Show, Little House on the Prairie, and numerous others.

== Personal life and death ==
From March 7, 1942, until her death on May 23, 1973, Boles was married to fellow character actor Athena Lorde. Their union produced two daughters and a son, two of whom, Barbara and Eric Boles, would later take up their parents' profession.

Survived by his three children, Boles died of a heart attack on May 26, 1977, in Sherman Oaks, Los Angeles, California at age 63.

== Filmography ==
| Year | Title | Role | Notes |
|---|---|---|---|
| 1950 | The Tattooed Stranger | Fisher | |
| 1950-1951 | One Man's Family | Joe | 9 episodes |
| 1950-1954 | Rocky King Detective | | (1) Season 1 Episode 2 (1950) (2) Season 2 Episode 48: "All Tied Up" (1951) (3) Season 5 Episode 35: "Murder Will Out (1954) |
| 1951 | The Man with My Face | Meadows | |
| 1952-1954 | Armstrong Circle Theatre | (2) Vic | (1) Season 2 Episode 30: "Troubled Sands" (1952) (2) Season 4 Episode 38: "The Use of Dignity" (1954) |
| 1952-1956 | Robert Montgomery Presents | (2) Ed Marley (3) Fred Hansen | (1) Season 3 Episode 17: "Storm" (1952) (2) Season 5 Episode 34: "Big Boy" (1954) (3) Season 7 Episode 17: "Three Men from Tomorrow" (1956) |
| 1954 | Inner Sanctum | (1) Lorbie (2) Postal Clerk (3) Gunner | (1) Season 1 Episode 1: "The Stranger" (2) Season 1 Episode 21: "Handle With Care" (3) Season 1 Episode 30: "Reward for Janie" |
| 1954-1955 | The Jackie Gleason Show | (1) Bullets Durgom (2) Joe the Thug (3) Marty | (1) Season 3 Episode 5: "The People's Choice" (1954) (2) Season 3 Episode 21: "The Honeymooners: The Great Jewel Robbery" (1955) (3) Season 3 Episode 32: "Stand-In for Murder: Part II" (1955) |
| 1957 | Naked in the Sun | Arthur Gillis | |
| 1958-1960 | The United States Steel Hour | (1) Matty Coombs (2) Tim Parker | (1) Season 5 Episode 11: "Never Know the End" (1958) (2) Season 7 Episode 23: "Shadow of a Pale Horse" (1960) |
| 1959 | The Phil Silvers Show | Lieutenant Fletcher | Season 4 Episode 27: "Guinea Pig Bilko" |
| 1960 | Have Gun – Will Travel | Billy the Hat | Season 4 Episode 9: "The Poker Fiend" |
| 1960 | The Pusher | Newspaper Vendor | |
| 1961 | The Defenders | Court Clerk | Season 1 Episode 8: "The Accident" |
| 1961-1962 | Naked City | (1) Sorin (2) Turnkey | (1) Season 2 Episode 12: "Landscape with Dead Figures" (1961) (2) Season 3 Episode 14: "Portrait of a Painter" (1962) |
| 1961-1962 | Cheyenne | (1) Dalton (2) Perly Wilkens | (1) Season 6 Episode 5: "Day's Pay" (1961) (2) Season 7 Episode 13: "Showdown at Oxbend" (1962) |
| 1961-1963 | The Twilight Zone | (1) Dispatcher (2) Obed Miller | (1) Season 3 Episode 2: "The Arrival" (1961) (2) Season 4 Episode 7: "Jess-Belle" (1963) |
| 1961-1963 | Hawaiian Eye | (1) George Cross (2) Curtis Childs | (1) Season 2 Episode 33: "Father, Dear Father" (1961) (2) Season 4 Episode 22: "Gift of Love" (1963) |
| 1962 | Bronco | Jonathan Hawley | Season 4 Episode 18: "Then the Mountains" |
| 1962-1963 | The Lucy Show | (1) Delivery Man (2) Mr. Harris | (1) Season 1 Episode 11: "Lucy Builds a Rumpus Room" (1962) (2) Season 1 Episode 29: "Lucy and the Runaway Butterfly" (1963) |
| 1963 | Temple Houston | | Season 1 Episode 1: "The Twisted Rope" |
| 1963 | The Eleventh Hour | George Wilbur | Season 1 Episode 28: "I Feel Like a Rutabaga" |
| 1963 | The Dick Powell Theatre | Frank Beasley | Season 2 Episode 29: "The Old Man and the City" |
| 1963-1965 | The Alfred Hitchcock Hour | (1) Grocer (2) Sheriff Reynolds (3) Reverend Gilfoyle | (1) Season 2 Episode 3: "Terror at Northfield" (1963) (2) Season 3 Episode 1: "The Return of Verge Likens" (1964) (3) Season 3 Episode 27: "The Second Wife" (1965) |
| 1963-1965 | Perry Mason | (1) Night Man (2) Estate Guard | (1) Season 7 Episode 2: "The Case of the Shifty Shoebox" (1963) (2) Season 8 Episode 28: "The Case of the Grinning Gorilla" (1965) |
| 1963-1967 | Bob Hope Presents the Chrysler Theatre | (1) Platt (2) Stagecoach Driver | (1) Season 1 Episode 1: "A Killing at Sundial" (1963) (2) Season 4 Episode 16: "The Lady is My Wife" (1967) |
| 1963-1968 | The Virginian | (1) Mr. Goren (2) Henry Wirtz (3) Farmer | (1) Season 2 Episode 4: "A Killer in Town" (1963) (2) Season 4 Episode 15: "Blaze of Glory" (1965) (3) Season 6 Episode 20: "The Good-Hearted Badman" (1968) |
| 1964 | McHale's Navy | Senator Block | Season 2 Episode 20: "Evil-Eye Parker" |
| 1964 | He Rides Tall | Cowhand | Uncredited |
| 1964 | Fate Is the Hunter | Airline Passenger | Uncredited |
| 1964-1965 | Profiles in Courage | (1) President of US Senate (2) Millard Fillmore | (1) Season 1 Episode 3: "Thomas Hart Benton" (1964) (2) Season 1 Episode 13: "Daniel Webster" (1965) |
| 1964-1967 | Bonanza | (1) Pete Burnside (2) Fred Aldrich, Banker | (1) Season 5 Episode 31: "The Dark Past" (1964) (2) Season 9 Episode 3: "The Conquistadores" (1967) |
| 1965 | A Man Called Shenandoah | Clay | Season 1 Episode 14: "The Bell" |
| 1965 | Rawhide | Ephraim Kurtz | Season 7 Episode 21: "The Winter Soldier" |
| 1965 | Daniel Boone | Parson | Season 1 Episode 18: "The Sound of Fear" |
| 1965 | John Goldfarb, Please Come Home! | Air Force Colonel | Uncredited |
| 1965 | Fluffy | Pete | |
| 1965-1967 | The Big Valley | (1) Barber (2) Storekeeper (3) Red | (1) Season 1 Episode 10: "The Murdered Party" (1965) (2) Season 1 Episode 23: "The Fallen Hawk" (1966) (3) Season 3 Episode 6: "Ladykiller" (1967) |
| 1966 | The Ghost and Mr. Chicken | Billy Ray Fox | |
| 1966 | The Trouble with Angels | Mr. Gottschalk | |
| 1966 | A Big Hand for the Little Lady | Pete | |
| 1966-1967 | Get Smart | Dr. Ratton | (1) Season 1 Episode 19: "Back to the Old Drawing Board" (1966) (2) Season 3 Episode 8: "When Good Fellows Get Together" (1967) |
| 1966-1967 | The Monkees | (1) Farmer Fisher (2) Preacher | (1) Season 1 Episode 8: "Don't Look a Gift Horse in the Mouth" (1966) (2) Season 2 Episode 7: "Hillbilly Honeymoon" (1967) |
| 1966-1967 | The Man from U.N.C.L.E. | (1) Dr. Lazarus (2) Scientist (3) Dr. Simon True | (1) Season 2 Episode 19: "The Waverly Ring Affair" (1966) (2) Season 3 Episode 4: "The Super-Colossal Affair" (1966) (3) Season 3 Episode 28: "The Five Daughters Affair: Part I" (1967) |
| 1967 | Lost in Space | Smeek | Season 2 Episode 23: "Treasure of the Lost Planet" |
| 1967 | The Reluctant Astronaut | Bartender | Uncredited |
| 1967 | Waterhole No. 3 | Corporal Blyth | |
| 1967-1968 | The Guns of Will Sonnett | (1) Preacher (2) Janney | (1) Season 1 Episode 14: "Find a Sonnett, Kill a Sonnett" (1967) (2) Season 2 Episode 12: "Where There's Hope" (1968) |
| 1968 | P.J. | Landlord's Agent | |
| 1968 | The Shakiest Gun in the West | Big Spring Townsman | Uncredited |
| 1968 | With Six You Get Eggroll | Pete | Uncredited |
| 1968-1974 | Mannix | (1) Emil, Theatrical Mask Maker (2) Peters | (1) Season 2 Episode 7: "Edge of the Knife" (1968) (2) Season 8 Episode 3: "A Fine Day for Dying" (1974) |
| 1969 | Angel in My Pocket | Corby Gresham | |
| 1969 | The Love God? | Amos Peacock | |
| 1969 | Mod Squad | Dr. Reston | Season 1 Episode 22: "Child of Sorrow, Child of Light" |
| 1970 | The Name of the Game | (1) Larkin (2) Tim Tim | (1) Season 2 Episode 20: "The King of Denmark" (2) Season 3 Episode 4: "Battle at Gannon's Bridge" |
| 1970 | WUSA | Hot Dog Vendor | Uncredited |
| 1970-1971 | Marcus Welby, M.D. | (1) Mr. Householder (2) Buck Jensen | (1) Season 2 Episode 12: "All the Golden Dandelions Are Gone" (1970) (2) Season 3 Episode 14: "Of Magic Shadow Shapes" (1971) |
| 1971 | Skin Game | Auction Clerk | |
| 1971-1972 | Gunsmoke | (1) Sutro (2) Kesting | (1) Season 16 Episode 23: "Pike: Part 1" (1971) (2) Season 18 Episode 11: "The Sodbusters" (1972) |
| 1972 | The F.B.I. | News Vendor | Season 8 Episode 6: "End of a Nightmare" |
| 1972-1973 | Night Gallery | (1) Bennett (2) Father | (1) Season 2 Episode 16 (Segment: "Lindemann's Catch") (1972) (2) Season 3 Episode 12: "Death on a Barge" (1973) |
| 1972-1974 | The Odd Couple | (1) Minister (2) Sam | (1) Season 3 Episode 9: "The First Baby" (1972) (2) Season 5 Episode 6: "Strike Up the Band or Else" (1974) |
| 1973 | Love, American Style | Minister | Season 4 Episode 20 (Segment: "Love and the Baby Derby") |
| 1973 | Adam-12 | Harold Tanner | Season 6 Episode 2: "Rampart Division: The Senior Citizens" |
| 1973 | Barnaby Jones | Man | Season 2 Episode 7: "Divorce - Murderer's Style" |
| 1973 | Cannon | Sam Justin | Season 3 Episode 8: "Perfect Alibi" |
| 1973 | Ace Eli and Rodger of the Skies | Abraham | |
| 1973 | Doctor Death: Seeker of Souls | Caretaker Franz | |
| 1973 | When the Line Goes Through | | |
| 1973-1975 | The Streets of San Francisco | (1) Ed Davis, Pool Hall Operator (2) Maddox | (1) Season 1 Episode 20: "Trail of the Serpent" (1973) (2) Season 3 Episode 16: "Letters from the Grave" (1975) |
| 1974 | Kung Fu | Mooney | Season 3 Episode 7: "Cry of the Night Beast" |
| 1974 | Days of Our Lives | Ralph Dennis | Episode 2170 |
| 1974 | Nightmare Honeymoon | Uncle Everett | |
| 1975 | Jacqueline Susann's Once Is Not Enough | Scotty | |
| 1975 | The Apple Dumpling Gang | Easy Archie | |
| 1975-1976 | Little House on the Prairie | (1) Eldred Miller (2) Garvey (3) (4) Brewster | (1) Season 1 Episode 23: "To See the World" (1975) (2) Season 2 Episode 18: "The Long Road Home" (1976) (3) Season 3 Episode 6: "Journey in the Spring: Part I" (1976) (4) Season 3 Episode 7: "Journey in the Spring: Part II" (1976) |
| 1976 | Quincy, M.E. | Gus | Season 1 Episode 2: "Who's Who in Neverland" |
| 1976 | The Great Texas Dynamite Chase | Mr. Ralston | |
