= The Detectives (1959 TV series) =

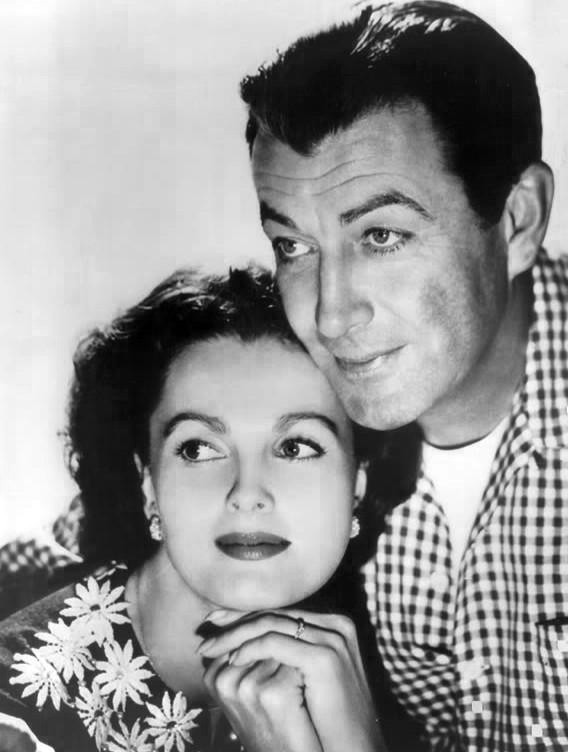
- Robert Taylor as Capt. Matt Holbrook and wife Ursula Thiess as Lisa Bonay in The Detectives
- Also known as: Robert Taylor's Detectives Captain of Detectives
- Genre: Crime drama
- Written by: Lee Berg; Borden Chase; Patricia Chase; Calvin Clements Sr. Norman T. Herman; Michael Morris; Louis Pelletier; Gene Roddenberry; Alvin Sapinsley; Palmer Thompson
- Directed by: Lewis Allen; Richard Carlson; Thomas Carr; Alvin Ganzer; Murray Golden; Arthur Hiller; Arnold Laven; Don McDougall; Don Medford; Ted Post; Paul Wendkos
- Starring: Robert Taylor; Tige Andrews; Russell Thorson; Lee Farr; Mark Goddard; Adam West
- Composer: Herschel Burke Gilbert
- Country of origin: United States
- Original language: English
- No. of seasons: 3
- No. of episodes: 97

Production
- Producers: Levy-Gardner-Laven; Arthur H. Nadel
- Cinematography: Joseph F. Biroc; Wilfred M. Cline
- Editors: Lyle Boyer; Marsh Hendry
- Running time: 25 minutes (1959–1961); 50 minutes (1961–1962)

Original release
- Network: ABC (1959–1961); NBC (1961–1962)
- Release: October 16, 1959 – May 18, 1962

The Detectives (also known as The Detectives Starring Robert Taylor, Captain of Detectives, and Robert Taylor's Detectives) is an American crime drama series which ran on ABC during its first two seasons (sponsored by Procter & Gamble), and on NBC during its third and final season. The series, starring motion picture star Robert Taylor, was produced by Four Star Television in association with Levy-Gardner-Laven Productions.

== Synopsis ==
Taylor stars as Detective Captain Matt Holbrook, the tough, no-nonsense head of an elite police investigative unit in a major U.S. city. Ostensibly, each man in Holbrook's hand-picked squad of detectives came from a different division. Lt. Johnny Russo (Tige Andrews) was from burglary, Lt. Jim Conway (Lee Farr) came from homicide, and Lt. Otto Lindstrom (Russell Thorson) was from the bunco squad.

== Production ==
In the series' second season, Farr left the series and was replaced by future Lost in Space star Mark Goddard as Detective Sgt. Chris Ballard. Future Batman star Adam West joined the cast during the third season as Sgt. Steve Nelson. The series moved to NBC for its third season and was increased from 30 to 60 minutes. The series was also retitled to Robert Taylor's Detectives. A total of 97 episodes were produced before the series was cancelled in 1962. The series was produced for Four Star by Levy-Gardner-Laven Productions, which produced other successful Four Star series, such as The Rifleman and The Big Valley.

Future Star Trek creator Gene Roddenberry was a contributing writer to the series.

== Cast ==
- Robert Taylor as Det. Capt. Matt Holbrook
- Tige Andrews as Lt. John "Johnny" Russo
- Russell Thorson as Lt. Otto Lindstrom (1959–1961)
- Lee Farr as Lt. James "Jimmy" Conway (1959–1960)
- Mark Goddard as Sgt. Chris Ballard (1960–1962)
- Ursula Thiess as Lisa Bonay (1960–1961)
- Adam West as Sgt. Steve Nelson (1961–1962)

=== Guest stars ===
- Chris Alcaide
- Philip Abbott
- Fred Beir
- Jack Betts
- Ellen Burstyn
- Dyan Cannon
- James Coburn
- Sheridan Comerate
- John Considine
- Yvonne Craig
- Robert Culp
- Ronnie Dapo
- Donna Douglas
- Jena Engstrom
- Bill Erwin
- Dianne Foster
- Eva Gabor
- Lew Gallo
- Bruce Gordon
- Frank Gorshin
- Arthur Hanson
- Edmund Hashim
- Joe Higgins
- Marianna Hill
- Bern Hoffman
- Harry Holcombe
- Clark Howat
- Marsha Hunt
- Bill Idelson
- Robert Karnes
- Warren J. Kemmerling
- William Kendis
- Fred Krone
- Lou Krugman
- Martin Landau
- Rusty Lane
- Len Lesser
- Scott Marlowe
- Lin McCarthy
- Joseph Mell
- Vera Miles
- William Mims
- George Mitchell
- Mary Murphy
- Jay North
- Cathy O'Donnell
- Jerry Paris
- Robert Patten
- Dee Pollock
- Sam Reese
- Pernell Roberts
- Chris Robinson
- Edward G. Robinson
- Teru Shimada
- Fay Spain
- Inger Stevens
- William Tannen
- Joan Taylor
- Lawrence Tierney
- Virginia Vincent
- Charles Wagenheim
- Patrick Waltz
- Dawn Wells
- Adam West
- William Windom

== Episodes ==
=== Season 1: 1959–60 ===
No. overall	No. in season	Title	Directed by	Written by	Original release date	Prod. code
1	1	"The Streger Affair"	Arnold Laven	Palmer Thompson	October 16, 1959	66-03
2	2	"Shot in the Dark"	Arnold Laven	Christopher Knopf	October 23, 1959	2810
3	3	"The Hiding Place"	Joseph H. Lewis	Donald S. Sanford	October 30, 1959	7102
4	4	"Decoy"	James Neilson	Louis Pelletier	November 6, 1959	2830
5	5	"The Murderous Deadline"	Don Medford	Palmer Thompson	November 13, 1959	2826
6	6	"The Bait"	Don Medford	Leonard Freeman	November 20, 1959	2836
7	7	"My Name is Tommy"	Joseph H. Lewis	Peter Packer	November 27, 1959	2812
8	8	"Back-Seat Driver"	Arthur Hiller	Meyer Dolinsky	December 4, 1959	2834
9	9	"Two-Time Loser"	Don Medford	Robert J. Shaw	December 11, 1959	2802
10	10	"The Long Drive"	Don Medford	Stanley Niss	December 18, 1959	7106
11	11	"Masquerade"	Stuart Rosenberg	Richard Collins	December 25, 1959	2808
12	12	"Life in the Balance"	Don Medford	Joseph Stefano	January 1, 1960	2816
13	13	"Karate"	Ted Post	Gene Roddenberry	January 8, 1960	2832
14	14	"Blue Fire"	Don Medford	Gene Roddenberry	January 15, 1960	2842
15	15	"My Brother's Keeper"	Don Medford	Herbert Abbott Spiro	January 22, 1960	2820
16	16	"House Call"	Arnold Laven	Peter Parker	January 29, 1960	7104
17	17	"The Trap"	Don Medford	Herbert Abbott Spiro	February 5, 1960	2844
18	18	"Conspiracy of Silence"	Stuart Rosenberg	Peter Packer	February 12, 1960	2806
19	19	"Twelve Hours to Live"	Arthur Hiller	Peter Packer	February 19, 1960	2814
20	20	"Anatomy of Fear"	Don Medford	Joseph Petracca	February 26, 1960	2846
21	21	"Armed and Dangerous"	William Graham	Louis Pelletier	March 4, 1960	2838
22	22	"The Bad Eye of Rosa Rosetti"	Don Medford	Joseph Stefano	March 11, 1960	2840
23	23	"Time and Tide"	Harry Keller	David P. Harmon	March 18, 1960	2850
24	24	"Little Girl Lost"	Don Medford	Calvin Clements Sr.	March 25, 1960	2848
25	25	"The Chameleon Truck"	Robert B. Sinclair	Robert B. Sinclair	April 1, 1960	2822
26	26	"The Old Gang"	Ted Post	Curtis Kenyon	April 8, 1960	2854
27	27	"The Bodyguards"	James Yarbrough	Palmer Thompson	April 15, 1960	2856
28	28	"The Prowler"	Arnold Laven	Story by : Alfred Brenner; Teleplay by : Milton Gelman	April 22, 1960	2852
29	29	"Floating Face Down"	Felix E. Feist	Michael Plant	April 29, 1960	2804
30	30	"The Long Jump"	Paul Wendkos	Peter Packer	May 6, 1960	2824
31	31	"Trial by Fire"	Richard Whorf	Stanley Niss	May 13, 1960	2828
32	32	"The Retirement of Maria Muir"	Paul Wendkos	Judy & George W. George	May 20, 1960	2818
33	33	"Song of Songs"	Don Medford	Joseph Stefano	May 27, 1960	2862

=== Season 2: 1960–61 ===
No. overall	No. in season	Title	Directed by	Written by	Original release date	Prod. code
34	1	"The New Man"	Don Medford	Lee Karson	September 16, 1960	
35	2	"Longshot"	John Rich	Borden & Patricia Chase	September 23, 1960	
36	3	"The Sports Job"	Arnold Laven	Harry Kronman	September 30, 1960	
37	4	"Alibis"	Alvin Ganzer	Michael Morris	October 7, 1960	
38	5	"Shuttle"	Alvin Ganzer	Peter Packer	October 14, 1960	
39	6	"Cop on Trial"	Roger Kay	Borden & Patricia Chase	November 4, 1960	
40	7	"The Little Witness"	Arthur Hiller	Lee Berg	November 11, 1960	
41	8	"You Only Die Once"	Arthur Hiller	David Harmon	November 18, 1960	
42	9	"Adopted"	Ted Post	Story by : Erna Lazarus; Teleplay by : Harry Kronman & Erna Lazarus	November 25, 1960	
43	10	"The Other Side"	Paul Wendkos	Borden & Patricia Chase	December 2, 1960	
44	11	"The Scalpel"	John Rich	Palmer Thompson	December 9, 1960	
45	12	"Big Poison"	Gerald Mayer	Ellis Marcus	December 16, 1960	
46	13	"The Informer"	William F. Claxton	Henry Greenberg	December 23, 1960	
47	14	"Razor's Edge"	Paul Wendkos	Lawrence Dobkin	December 30, 1960	
48	15	"The Frightened Ones"	Lamont Johnson	Gordon Gordon & Mildred Gordon	January 6, 1961	
49	16	"Power Failure"	Lewis Allen	Laurence Mascott	January 13, 1961	
50	17	"Kinfolk"	Don Weis	Jay Simms	January 20, 1961	
51	18	"Quiet Night"	Dick Moder	George Bruce	January 27, 1961	
52	19	"See No Evil"	Tom Gries	John K. Butler & Boyd Correll	February 3, 1961	
53	20	"Personal Enemy"	Robert Butler	A. I. Bezzerides	February 10, 1961	
54	21	"Matt's Woman"	Lewis Allen	Story by : Donn Mullally; Teleplay by : Donn Mullally & Harry Kronman	February 17, 1961	
55	22	"An Eye for an Eye"	James Clavell	Mort Thaw	February 24, 1961	
56	23	"Bad Apple"	Paul Wendkos	Howard Dimsdale	March 3, 1961	

=== Season 3: 1961–62 ===
No. overall	No. in season	Title	Directed by	Written by	Original release date	Prod. code
68	1	"Tobey's Place"	Paul Wendkos	Michael Morris	September 29, 1961	
69	2	"The Legend of Jim Riva"	Richard Carlson	Story by : Arthur Browne Jr. Teleplay by : John K. Butler & Boyd Correll	October 6, 1961	
70	3	"Shadow of His Brother"	Richard Carlson	Palmer Thompson	October 13, 1961	
71	4	"A Barrell Full of Monkeys"	Robert Butler	Calvin Clements Sr.	October 27, 1961	
72	5	"One Lucky Break"	Thomas Carr	Alvin Sapinsley	November 3, 1961	
73	6	"A Piece of Tomorrow"	Walter Doniger	Lee Berg	November 10, 1961	
74	7	"Beyond a Reasonable Doubt"	Alvin Ganzer	Herman Groves	November 17, 1961	
75	8	"Hit and Miss"	Richard Carlson	Louis Pelletier	December 1, 1961	
76	9	"Song of the Guilty Heart"	Ted Post	Michael Morris	December 8, 1961	
77	10	"Escort"	Richard Carlson	Ed Adamson	December 15, 1961	
78	11	"The Queen of Craven Point"	Thomas Carr	Calvin Clements Sr.	December 22, 1961	
79	12	"Act of God"	Paul Wendkos	Jack Laird	December 29, 1961	
80	13	"Point of No Return"	Charles F. Haas	Calvin Clements Sr.	January 12, 1962	
81	14	"Crossed Wires"	Richard Carlson	Antony Ellis	January 19, 1962	
82	15	"Night on the Town"	Robert Butler	Elliot West	January 26, 1962	
83	16	"Pandora's Box"	Paul Wendkos	Calvin Clements Sr.	February 2, 1962	
84	17	"The Jagged Edge"	Alvin Ganzer	A.I. Bezzerides	February 9, 1962	
85	18	"The Outsider"	Thomas Carr	Barry Trivers	February 16, 1962	
86	19	"Walk a Crooked Line"	Lewis Allen	Clark Howat	February 23, 1962	
87	20	"Night Boat"	Arthur Hiller	Calvin Clements Sr.	March 2, 1962	
88	21	"One Lousy Wednesday"	Lewis Allen	Alvin Sapinsley	March 9, 1962	
89	22	"The Con Man"	Paul Wendkos	Lewis Reed	March 16, 1962	
90	23	"Never The Twain"	Richard Donner	Calvin Clements Sr.	March 23, 1962	
91	24	"Three Blind Mice: Part 1"	Paul Wendkos	Alvin Sapinsley	March 30, 1962	
92	25	"Three Blind Mice: Part 2"	Paul Wendkos	Alvin Sapinsley	April 6, 1962	
93	26	"Finders Keepers"	Paul Wendkos	Don Brinkley	April 13, 1962	
94	27	"The Fourth Commandment"	Lawrence Dobkin	Lee Berg	April 20, 1962	
95	28	"The Walls Have Eyes"	Alvin Ganzer	Gordon Gordon, Mildred Gordon, & Anthony Boucher	April 27, 1962	
96	29	"Strangers in the House"	Tom Gries	Peter Stephens	May 4, 1962	
97	30	"Saturday Edition"	Robert Butler	Sy Salkowitz	May 18, 1962	

== Release ==
=== Syndication ===
In syndication, the series was rebroadcast for a time under the name, Captain of Detectives. Rebroadcasts were shown in the early 2000s on cable's TV Land network.

=== Home media ===
The Detectives has been released in Germany (in dubbed German language only) under the name "Kein Fall für FBI" As of 2019, there has been no official release of Robert Taylor's "The Detectives" on DVD in the U.S.

== Other media ==
=== Paperback Novel ===
Prolific pulpsmith Norman A. Daniels was tapped by Lancer Books to write an original novel based on the series' concept and characters, and the book, named for the series, was released in 1962, with a cover price of 35¢, its copyright assigned to the author. It manages to sport all three iterations of the title: The cover, beneath a close-up photo of the star's eyes, says Robert Taylor starring in The Detectives; the spine says merely The Detectives and then cites the author; the title page proclaims Robert Taylor's Detectives.

=== Comic book ===
Dell Comics issued a comic book rendition of Robert Taylor's "The Detectives" during the series run .

== Related ==
A few years after The Detectives ended, Barbara Stanwyck, Robert Taylor's ex-wife, had her own series also produced by Four Star/Levy-Gardner-Laven Productions, The Big Valley, which also aired on ABC.

Several cast members on The Detectives went on to major TV roles after the series ended:

- Robert Taylor, series star of The Detectives, who played Det.Capt. Matt Holbrook, went on to star in the successful syndicated TV series Death Valley Days, where he remained until his death in 1969. He had enjoyed a long and successful film career as a leading man in over 70 films- prior to starring in The Detectives.
- Adam West, who was added to the cast in The Detectives' final season as Det. Steve Nelson, went on to play the lead role in the ABC series Batman.
- Tige Andrews, who played Det. Johnny Russo, went on to play as Police Detective Captain Adam Greer in ABC's The Mod Squad. He also appeared in the original Star Trek as Klingon officer Kras in the episode "Friday's Child".
- Mark Goddard, who played Det. Chris Ballard, went on to star in the CBS sci-fi series Lost in Space. Prior to the Detectives, Goddard co-starred in the popular (but cancelled after one season), CBS-TV series, Johnny Ringo, also produced by Four Star.
- Russell Thorson, who played Det. Otto Lindstrom, had a long list of film and TV credits before and after The Detectives, including the TV movie "Cocoon", the pilot episode of the original TV series Hawaii Five-O starring Jack Lord.
