= Kenneth M. Taylor =

World War II pilot and flying ace (1919–2006)

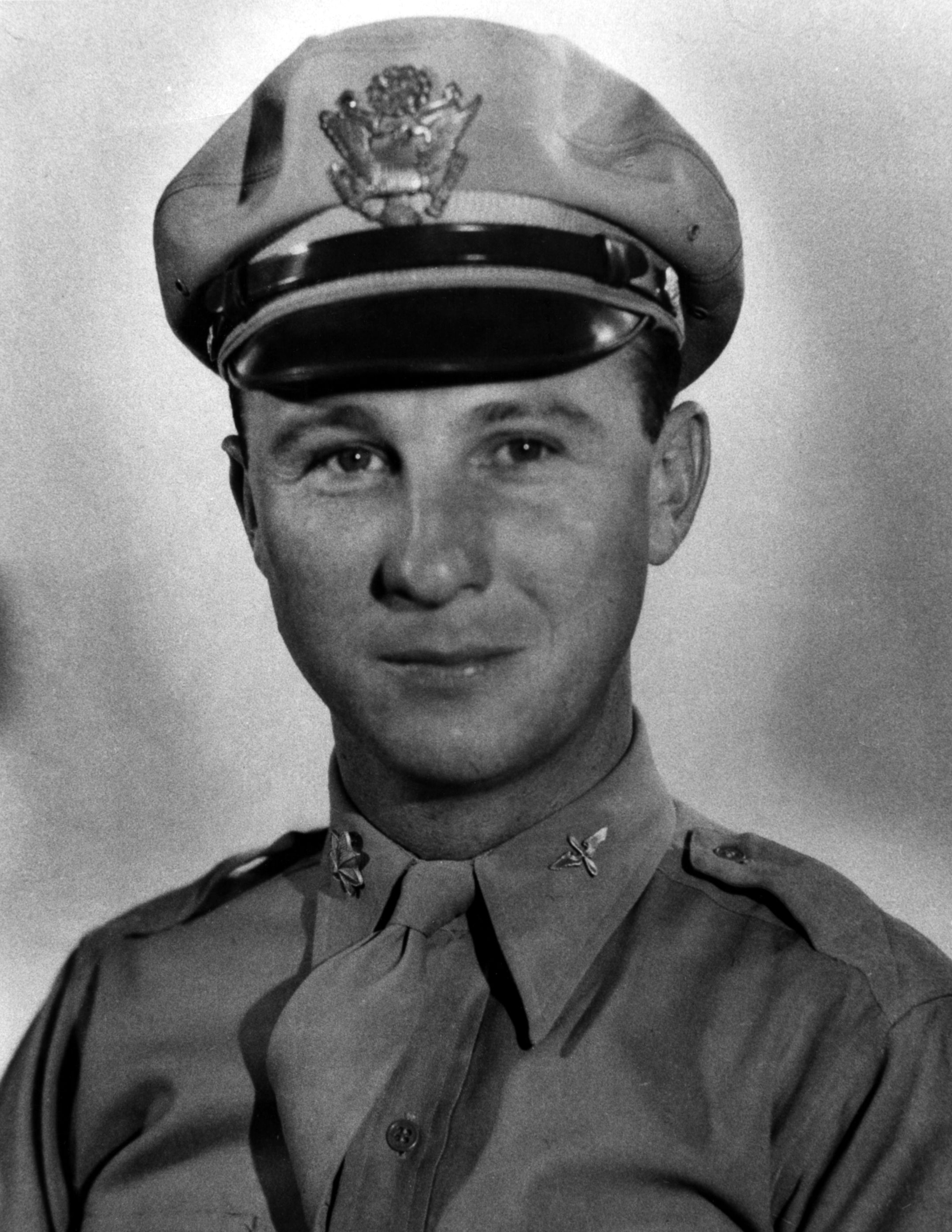
- Major Kenneth M. Taylor, c. 1945
- Born: December 23, 1919; Enid, Oklahoma
- Died: November 25, 2006 (aged 86); Tucson, Arizona
- Burial place: Arlington National Cemetery
- Military career
- Allegiance: United States
- Branch: United States Army Air Corps; United States Army Air Forces; United States Air Force; Alaska Air National Guard
- Service years: 1940–1971
- Rank: Brigadier General
- Units: 47th Pursuit Squadron; 44th Fighter Squadron; 12th Pursuit Squadron; 4961st Special Weapons Test 456th Fighter Squadron
- Conflicts: World War II: Attack on Pearl Harbor; Cold War
- Awards: Distinguished Service Cross; Army Distinguished Service Medal; Legion of Merit; Purple Heart; Air Medal
- Other work: Aviation insurance (1971–1985)

Kenneth Marlar Taylor (December 23, 1919 – November 25, 2006) was a United States Air Force officer and a flying ace of World War II. He was then a new United States Army Air Corps second lieutenant pilot stationed at Wheeler Field during the Japanese attack on Pearl Harbor on December 7, 1941. Along with his fellow pilot and friend George Welch, Taylor managed to get a fighter plane airborne under fire. Taylor claimed to have shot down four Japanese dive bombers but only two were confirmed. Taylor was injured during the incident and received several awards for his efforts, including the Distinguished Service Cross and the Purple Heart.

Taylor later commanded several squadrons while stationed in the United States and elsewhere, and served for 27 years of active duty. He joined the Alaska Air National Guard until 1971 and worked in the insurance industry before retiring in 1985. His Pearl Harbor experience was portrayed in the 1970 film Tora! Tora! Tora! and the film Pearl Harbor.

== Early years and military training ==
Shortly after his birth in Enid, Oklahoma, Taylor's father, Joe K. Taylor, moved his family to Hominy, Oklahoma, where Taylor graduated high school in 1938. He entered the University of Oklahoma as a pre-law student in the same year and joined the Army Air Corps two years later. He graduated from aviation training at Brooks Field near San Antonio, Texas on April 25, 1941, reaching the rank of second lieutenant and was assigned to class 41C. In June 1941, he was assigned to the 47th Pursuit Squadron at Wheeler Army Airfield in Honolulu, Hawaii, and began flying two weeks later. Although the 47th had several types of aircraft — some obsolete — he began his training in the advanced Curtiss P-40B tomahawk fighter. Taylor accumulated more than 430 flight hours of training before the attack on Pearl Harbor.

== Pearl Harbor ==
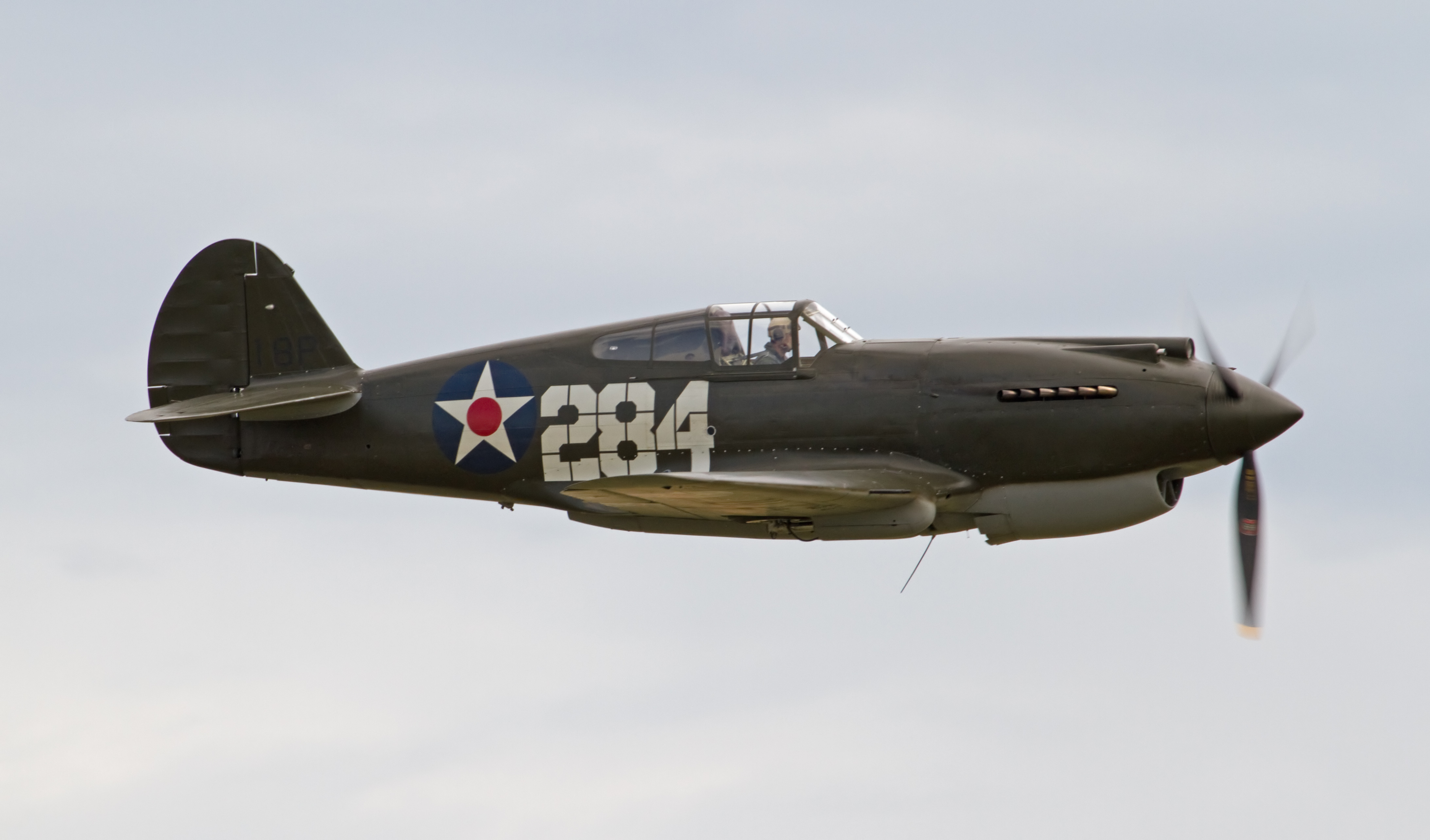
A Curtiss P-40 Tomahawk similar to the planes used by Taylor and Welch

Prior to the attack on Pearl Harbor on December 7, 1941, Taylor spent the night before playing poker and dancing at the officers' club at Wheeler with fellow pilot George Welch, and did not go to sleep until 6:30 a.m. local time. Taylor and Welch awoke less than an hour and a half later at 7:55 a.m. to the sounds of low-flying planes, machine-gun fire, and explosions. Lt. Taylor quickly put on his tuxedo pants from the night before and called Haleiwa Auxiliary Air Field, where eighteen P-40B fighters were located. Without orders, he told the ground crews to get two P-40s armed and ready for takeoff. The new Buick he drove was strafed by Japanese aircraft as the two pilots sped the 10 miles (16 km) to Haleiwa; Taylor at times reached speeds of 100 mph (160 km/h). At the airstrip, they climbed into their Curtiss P-40B Warhawk fighters, which were fueled but armed with only .30 cal Browning ammunition.

After they took off, they headed towards Barber's Point at the southwest tip of Oahu, and initially saw an unarmed group of American B-17 Flying Fortress bombers arriving from the mainland United States. They soon arrived at Ewa Mooring Mast Field, which was being strafed by at least 12 Aichi D3A "Val" dive bombers of the second Japanese attack wave after dropping their bombs at Pearl Harbor. Although the two pilots were outnumbered six-to-one, they immediately began firing on the dive bombers. Taylor shot down two dive bombers and was able to damage another (the third damaged aircraft was considered Taylor's first probable kill). When both pilots ran out of ammunition, they headed for Wheeler Field to get additional .50 cal ammunition, since Haleiwa did not carry any. As he landed around 8:40 a.m., he had to avoid friendly anti-aircraft and ground fire. Once he was on the ground, several officers told Taylor and Welch to leave the airplanes, but the two pilots were able to convince the officers into allowing them to keep fighting.

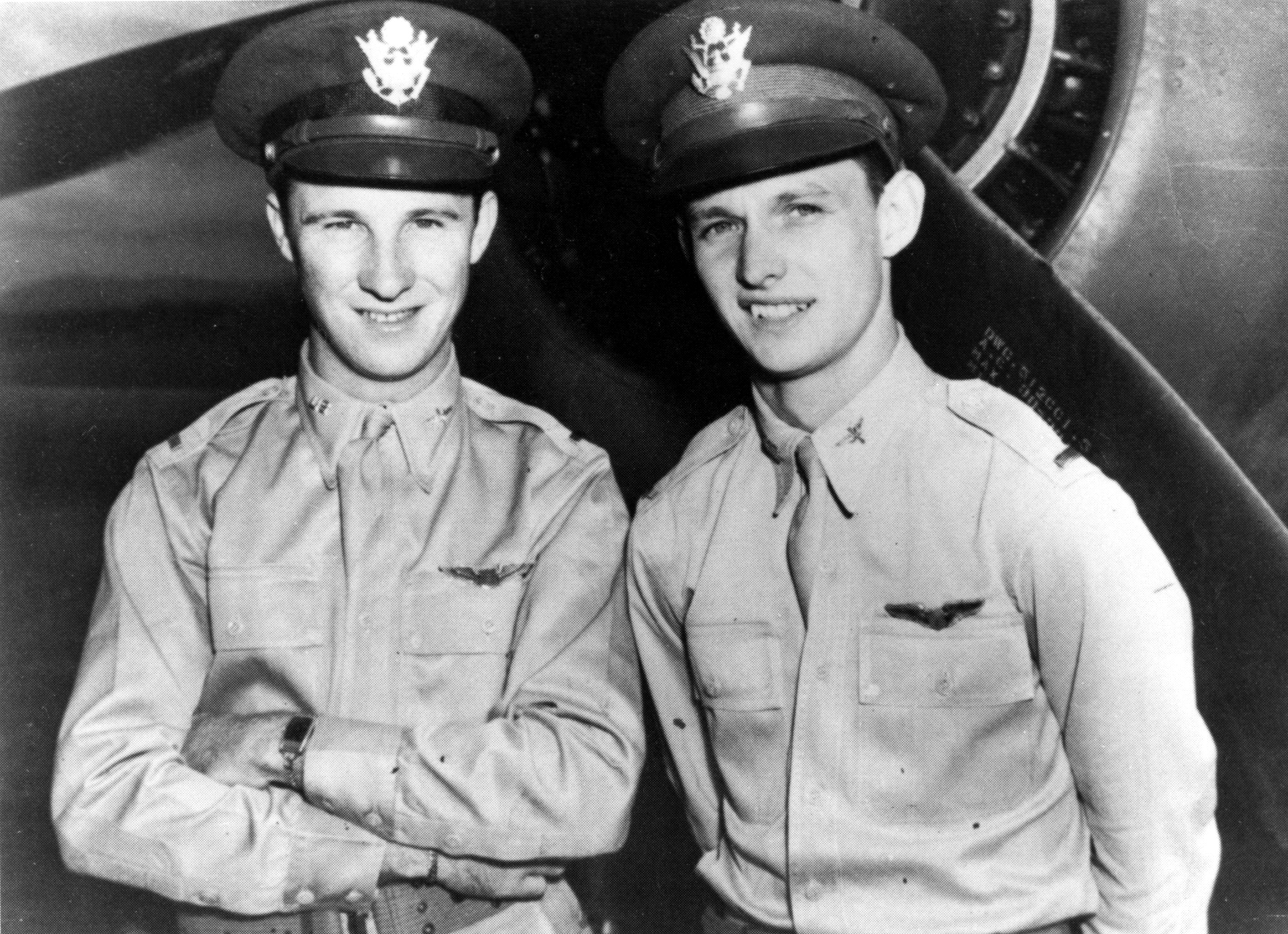
Taylor and Welch shortly after the Pearl Harbor attack

While his plane was being reloaded with the .50 cal, a flight of dive bombers began strafing Wheeler. Welch took off again (since he had landed a few minutes before Taylor and was already reloaded). The men who were loading the ammunition on Taylor's plane left the ammunition boxes on his wing as they scattered to get away from the bombers. Taylor quickly took off, jumping over an armament dolly and the ammunition boxes fell off of his plane's wing. Both pilots realized that if they took off away from the incoming aircraft they would become targets once they were airborne, so both headed directly towards the bombers at take-off. Additionally, if the low-flying bombers attempted to fire at the grounded P-40s at their current elevation, they would risk crashing. Taylor used this hindrance to his advantage and began immediately firing on the Japanese aircraft as he took off, and performed a chandelle.

Taylor headed for a group of Japanese aircraft, and due to a combination of clouds and smoke, he unintentionally entered the middle of the formation of seven or eight A6M Zeros. A Japanese rear-gunner from a dive bomber fired at Taylor's aircraft and one of the bullets came within an inch of Taylor's head and exploded in the cockpit. One piece went through his left arm and shrapnel entered his leg. Taylor reflected on the injuries in a 2001 interview, saying "It was of no consequence; it just scared the hell out of me for a minute." A few years after the interview, Taylor received from his crew chief two other slugs that had been found behind his seat. Welch shot down the dive bomber aircraft that had injured Taylor, and Taylor damaged another aircraft (his second probable kill) before pulling away to assist Welch with a pursuing A6M Zero fighter. The Zero and the rest of its formation soon broke off the pursuit and left to return to their carriers as Taylor neared Welch. Taylor continued to fire on several Japanese aircraft until he ran out of ammunition. Both pilots headed back to Haleiwa. After landing and driving back to Wheeler, Taylor and Welch passed by their squadron commander, Major Gordon H. Austin, who noticed that they were wearing their tuxedo attire. Unaware of their earlier dogfights, he shouted at the two men, saying "Get back to Haleiwa! You know there's a war on?" The two pilots explained what they had done, and the commander thanked them. In a 2003 interview, Taylor reflected on his actions: "I wasn't in the least bit terrified, and let me tell you why: I was too young and too stupid to realize that I was in a lot of danger."

=== Records and awards ===
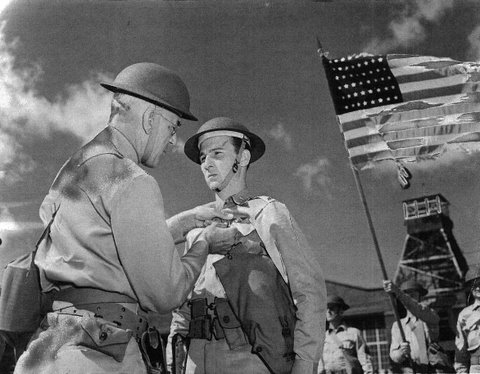
Taylor receiving the Distinguished Service Cross on January 8, 1942, for his efforts

According to the 25th Infantry Division's Tropic Lightning Museum, 14 different American pilots were able to take off during the surprise attack and record 10 Japanese aircraft kills. Air Corps records credit Welch with four kills and Taylor with two, yet new research of Japanese combat reports confirms Taylor got four kills (when the two probable kills are included). Taylor claimed in an interview: "I know for certain I shot down two planes or perhaps more; I don't know." On the 13th anniversary of the Pearl Harbor attack, the United States Air Force stated that they could not determine which of the two pilots shot down the first Japanese bomber: "Each of them in his first attack shot down an enemy bomber, so the difference in time would have been but a few seconds in any case." While in the air during the dogfight, the two pilots agreed that whoever survived the battle would claim credit to the title for the first kill. However, both pilots survived and because Welch outranked Taylor (he was a 41A, Taylor a 41C) and was the lead aircraft in the fight, he was credited with the first kill. The efforts of the two pilots' dogfights were able to divert the Japanese from destroying the Haleiwa air field, which the Japanese intelligence did not know about prior to the attack. Taylor later reacted to the attack, saying "I believed I was a better-trained pilot than the enemy. I had good equipment, and I was proud of it."

For their action on December 7, the U.S. War Department in Communiqué No. 19 on December 13, 1941, designated Taylor and Welch as the first two American heroes of World War II, and awarded both the Distinguished Service Cross on January 8, 1942. Taylor learned that he was to receive the award in mid-December after reading several newspapers. The award is the United States Army's second highest honor for valor in the heat of combat. Additionally, he later received the Distinguished Service Medal, the Legion of Merit, the Air Medal, and a Purple Heart for injuries he sustained. Unverified claims were later made that both men were recommended for the Medal of Honor, but were turned down because they had taken off without orders. However, no documentation has been found to support that the Medal of Honor was denied for these reasons, or even submitted.

== Military and National Guard service ==
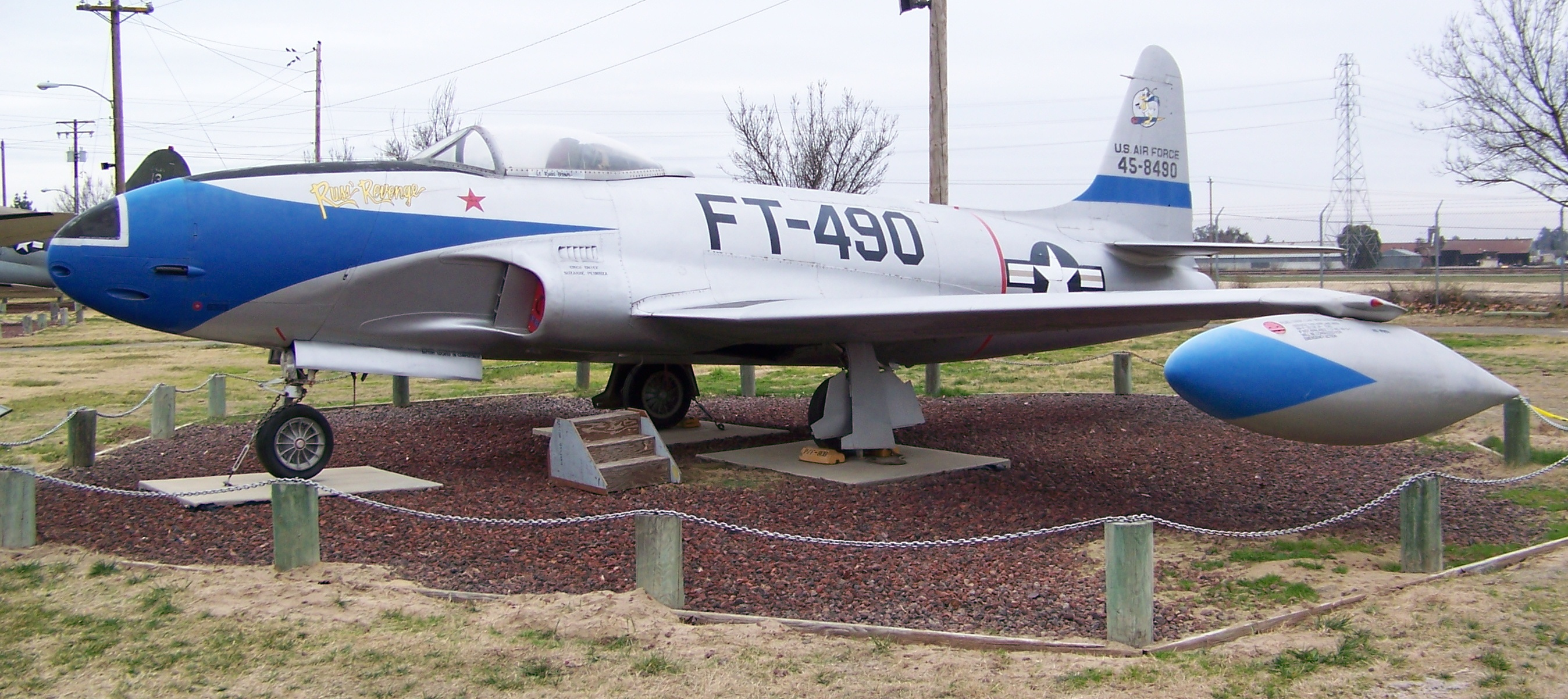
Taylor commanded a squadron that used the Lockheed F-80 Shooting Star.

After the Pearl Harbor attack, Taylor was assigned to the 44th Fighter Squadron, and went to the South Pacific at Henderson Field on Guadalcanal. He was able to record two additional aerial kills: the first on January 27 and the other on December 7, 1943, two years after Pearl Harbor. This brought his total number of career kills to six, making him a flying ace. Officially however, Taylor is still only credited with two aerial victories on December 7, 1941, and one on January 27, 1943. At Guadalcanal, he was injured during an air raid and was sent back to the United States in 1943. In the U.S., he trained pilots in preparation of combat in Europe and was then assigned to the 12th Pursuit Squadron. At the end of World War II, Taylor had reached the rank of major and went to the Philippines to command a squadron that used the first United States Air Force combat jets, the Lockheed F-80 Shooting Star.

Afterwards, he commanded the 4961st Special Weapons Test Group, became a tactical evaluator at the USAF Inspector General's office, and worked in The Pentagon. He was also the Deputy Chief of Staff and Plans for the Alaskan Air Command and was a long-range planner on the Joint Staff.

After 27 years of active duty, he retired as a colonel in the Regular U.S. Air Force in 1967 and soon started as the Assistant Adjutant General for the Alaska Air National Guard, retiring as a brigadier general in 1971. Taylor then worked in the insurance industry in Alaska until 1985.

== Awards and decorations ==
His awards and decorations include:

U.S. Air Force Command Pilot Badge
Distinguished Service Cross	Army Distinguished Service Medal	Legion of Merit
Purple Heart	Air Medal	Joint Service Commendation Medal
Air Force Outstanding Unit Award	American Defense Service Medal with service star	American Campaign Medal
Asiatic-Pacific Campaign Medal with two bronze campaign stars	World War II Victory Medal	Army of Occupation Medal with 'Japan' clasp
National Defense Service Medal with service star	Air Force Longevity Service Award with silver oak leaf cluster	Philippine Independence Medal

=== Distinguished Service Cross citation ===

Taylor, Kenneth M.
Second Lieutenant, U.S. Army Air Forces
47th Pursuit Squadron, 18th Pursuit Group, Hawaiian Air Force
Date of Action: December 7, 1941

Citation:

The President of the United States of America, authorized by Act of Congress, July 9, 1918, takes pleasure in presenting the Distinguished Service Cross to Second Lieutenant (Air Corps) Kenneth Marlar Taylor, United States Army Air Forces, for extraordinary heroism in connection with military operations against an armed enemy while serving as Pilot of a P-40 Fighter Airplane in the 47th Pursuit Squadron, 18th Pursuit Group, Hawaiian Air Force, in aerial combat against enemy forces on 7 December 1941, in action over the Island of Oahu, Territory of Hawaii, and waters adjacent thereto. When surprised by a heavy air attack by Japanese forces on Wheeler Field and vicinity at approximately 8 a.m., Lieutenant Taylor left Wheeler Field and proceeded by automobile under fire, to Haleiwa Landing Field, a distance of approximately ten miles, where the planes of his squadron were stationed. He immediately, on his own initiative, took off for the purpose of attacking the invading forces, without first obtaining information as to the number or type of planes in attacking forces, and proceeded to his initial point over Barbers Point. At take-off time his plane was equipped with thirty-caliber machineguns only. Upon arrival over Barbers Point, he observed a formation of approximately twelve planes over Ewa, about 1,000 feet below and ten miles away. Accompanied by only one other pursuit plane, he immediately attacked this enemy formation and shot down two enemy planes. No more enemy planes in sight, he proceeded to Wheeler to refuel and replenish ammunition. Reloading completed, but ammunition boxes not removed, a second wave of enemy planes attacked, approaching directly toward him at low altitude. Although advised not to go up again, Lieutenant Taylor made a quick take-off ending in a chandelle, thereby saving his plane as he escaped from a superior force of eight to ten planes by climbing into clouds. Lieutenant Taylor's initiative, presence of mind, coolness under fire against overwhelming odds in his first battle, expert maneuvering of his plane, and determined action contributed to a large extent toward driving off this sudden, unexpected attack. Second Lieutenant Taylor's unquestionable valor in aerial combat is in keeping with the highest traditions of the military service and reflects great credit upon himself, the Hawaiian Air Force, and the United States Army Air Forces.

== Personal life and depictions in film ==
On May 9, 1942, Taylor married Flora Love Morrison of Hennessey, Oklahoma, whom he had met when she was visiting her father in Hawaii. Married for 64 years, the Taylors had two children (daughter Jo Kristina "Tina" Hartley and son Kenneth Marlar Taylor, Jr.), three grandchildren, and two great-grandchildren. While he lived in Anchorage, Taylor would vacation in Hawaii each year. Taylor's son, Vietnam War veteran Kenneth Marlar Taylor, Jr. (born 1943), later retired as a brigadier general in 1997 commanding the Alaska Air National Guard after 31 years of service, the same position formerly held by his father.

At a 50th anniversary symposium of the Pearl Harbor attack, Taylor met with a Japanese pilot who was part of the first wave of bombers to attack Pearl Harbor. The pilot reflected on Taylor's efforts, "I was impressed by Mr. Taylor's grit to storm into the pack of Japanese fighters", and Taylor also told a reporter "I have no hatred against Japanese people, but I do against those who started the war."

Taylor was a technical adviser for and was portrayed in the 1970 film Tora! Tora! Tora! by Carl Reindel. The 2001 film Pearl Harbor featured a sequence in which the characters portrayed by Ben Affleck and Josh Hartnett took to the skies to fight the Japanese. This sequence is understood to be a fill-in for Taylor's and Welch's roles, but the characters do not bear any other similarities to Taylor and Welch. Unlike Tora! Tora! Tora!, Taylor was not consulted for the Pearl Harbor film, and later called the film "... a piece of trash...over-sensationalized and distorted."

== Death ==
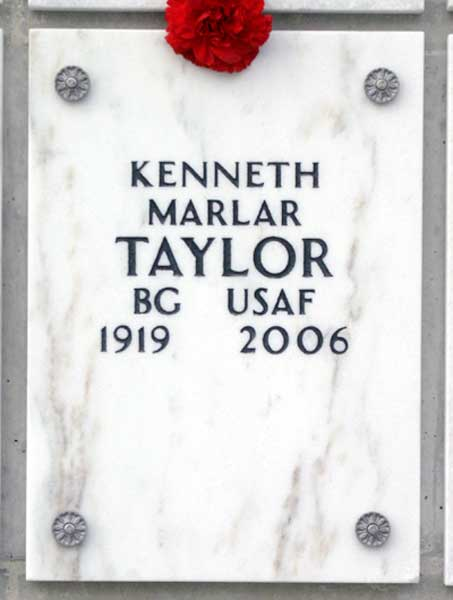
Taylor's tombstone at the Arlington National Cemetery

After contracting an illness from a hip surgery two years prior, Taylor died on November 25, 2006, of a strangulated hernia at an assisted living residence in Tucson, Arizona. His son stated that he wanted "to be remembered mostly as a good father, husband, grandfather and great-grandfather. He was very loyal and dutiful, and to him that was more important than what he did in the war." He was cremated and later buried at the Arlington National Cemetery in June 2007 with full military honors. Alaska Senator Ted Stevens gave a eulogy at the United States Senate prior to the service at Arlington.
