= Thundering Jets =

1958 film by Helmut Dantine

- Theatrical release poster
- Directed by: Helmut Dantine
- Screenplay by: James Landis
- Produced by: Jack Leewood
- Starring: Rex Reason; Dick Foran; Audrey Dalton; Barry Coe; Buck Class; Robert Dix
- Cinematography: John M. Nickolaus, Jr.
- Edited by: Frank Baldridge
- Music by: Irving Gertz
- Production company: Regal Films Inc
- Distributed by: 20th Century Fox
- Release date: May 1958
- Running time: 73 minutes
- Country: United States
- Language: English

Thundering Jets is a 1958 American drama film directed by Helmut Dantine, written by James Landis, and starring Rex Reason, Dick Foran, Audrey Dalton, Barry Coe, and Robert Dix.

Thundering Jets was released in May 1958, by 20th Century Fox.

== Plot ==
At the United States Edwards Air Force Base Flight Test School, instructor wartime veteran Capt. Steve Morley (Rex Reason) resents "playing nursemaid to a bunch of glory jockeys." The new class includes Kurt Weber (Giuseppe Addobbati), who flew for Germany during World War II; Maj. Mike Geron (Buck Class); show-off Capt. Murphy (Lee Farr); Lt. Jimmy Erskine (Robert Dix); and Lt. Bob Kiley (Robert Conrad). (Note: Conrad was in one of his first roles.)

Steve meets his sweetheart, Susan Blair (Audrey Dalton), a secretary for Lt. Col. Spalding (Dick Fora). Dissatisfied with his role, his pupils continue to have problems as he tries to stress that discipline is important. Both Susan and Steve's fellow flight instructors caution him that he is too harsh. Asking again for a transfer, Steve is denied.

On a training mission the next day, Murphy flies dangerously and is expelled for his irresponsible behavior. Fellow students are certain that Steve is to blame. Later Steve takes Mike up, but the engine flames out and Mike passes out. Steve seizes the controls and lands the aircraft safely, saving them both and the aircraft. Finally, his students accept Steve, realizing he is just trying to help them achieve their goal of becoming test pilots.

== Cast ==
- Rex Reason as Capt. Steve Morley
- Dick Foran as Lt. Col. Henry Spalding
- Audrey Dalton as Susan Blair
- Barry Coe as Capt. "Cotton" Davis
- Buck Class as Maj. Mike Geron
- Robert Dix as Lt. Jimmy Erskine
- Lee Farr as Capt. Murphy
- Giuseppe Addobbati as Kurt Weber
- Robert Conrad as Lt. Robert "Tiger Bob" Kiley
- Maudie Prickett as Mrs. Blocher
- Richard Monahan as Mechanic #1
- Sid Melton as Sgt. Eddie Stone
- William Kerwin as Gary
- Gregg Palmer as Capt. Cory Dexter
- Lionel Ames as Capt. "Andy" Anderson
- Bill Bradley as Student #1

== Production ==
Thundering Jets was filmed primarily at the United States Flight Test School at Edwards Air Force Base, employing the school's Lockheed T-33 Shooting Star jet training aircraft. The production used mainly stock footage with one T-33 on loan to the studio and was featured in the process shots.

== Reception ==
Aviation film historian Stephen Pendo in Aviation in the Cinema, considered Thundering Jets a "... poor picture and has only routine aerial shots."
