= Jo Morrow =

American actress (born 1939)

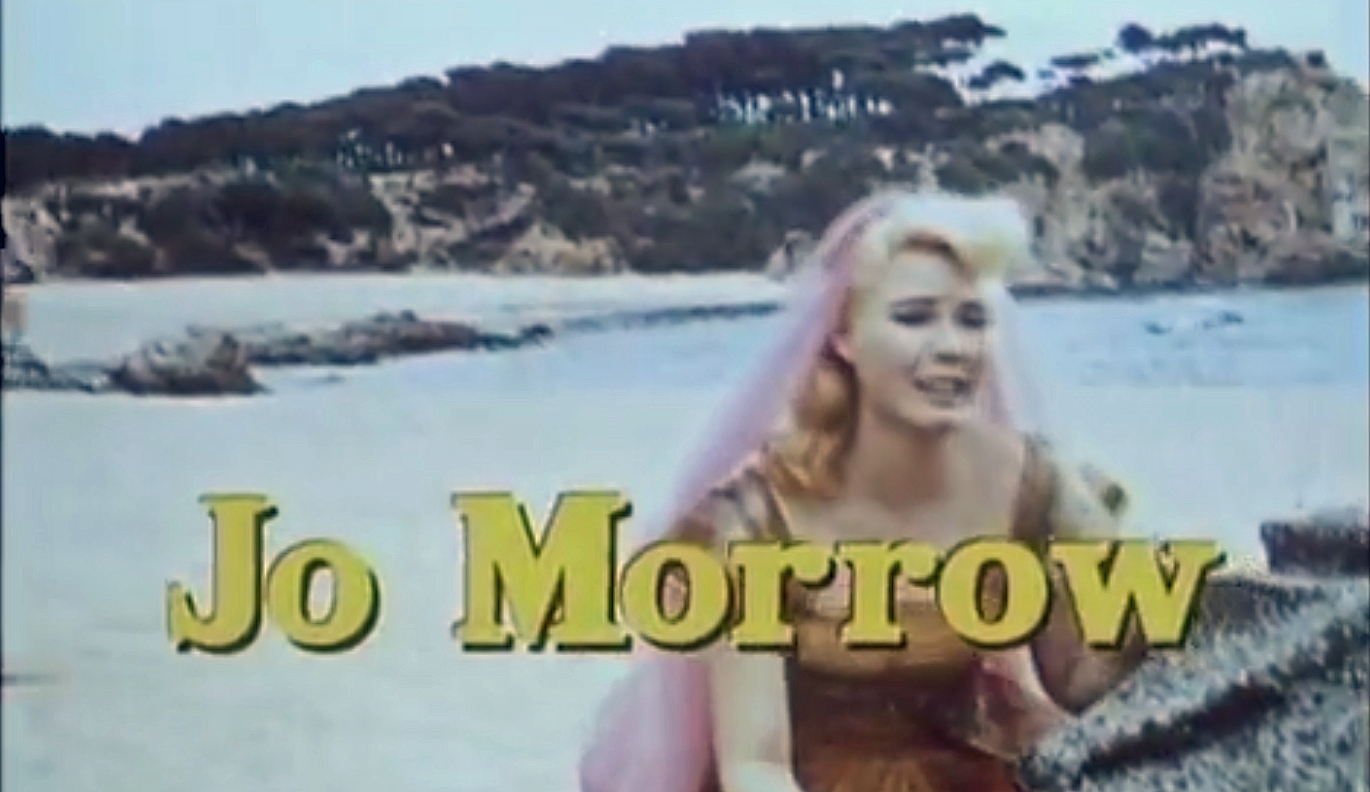
- Morrow in The 3 Worlds of Gulliver
- Born: Beverly Jo Morrow; November 1, 1939 (age 86); Texas, US
- Occupation: Actress
- Years active: 1958–1976
- Spouse: Jack Barnett (m. 1963; div. 1984)
- Children: 2

Beverly Jo Morrow (born November 1, 1939) is an American actress who played the female lead in six B films between 1958 and 1964, and supporting roles in four major studio features, as well as appearing in 12 television episodes. Following a six-year absence, she returned to the screen in 1970, but, after a few minor supporting roles in exploitation films such as Terminal Island and Doctor Death, she retired again in 1976.

== Early years ==
Morrow was born in Texas. She won the 1958 Miss Pasadena (California) title and represented the city in that year's Miss California contest.

== Career ==
Through a "Be a Star" contest, Morrow won a film contract with 20th Century Fox (with Gary Cooper in Ten North Frederick) in 1958. After only one film with 20th Century-Fox, she moved to Columbia Pictures, allegedly because a producer at 20th Century Fox tried to make a pass at her. At Columbia, she made some 10 films and a dozen TV series episodes between 1958 and 1963, the most notable being Our Man in Havana, in which she played Alec Guinness's daughter Milly. In 1962, Morrow appeared as Melanie Wells on the TV Western Lawman in the episode titled "The Bride".

== Personal life ==
On June 30, 1963, Morrow married Jack Barnett, songwriter for Jimmy Durante. She gave up movies to look after her daughter Dawn who was born deaf in 1964. Son James followed two years later. She had a brief comeback in a few exploitation films and TV series episodes in the 1970s.

== Filmography ==
Year	Film	Role
1958	Ten North Frederick	Waitress
1959	Juke Box Rhythm	Princess Ann
1959	Gidget	Mary Lou
1959	The Legend of Tom Dooley	Laura Foster
1959	Our Man in Havana	Milly Wormold
1960	13 Ghosts	Medea Zorba
1960	The 3 Worlds of Gulliver	Gwendolyn
1962	Brushfire!	Mary Carter
1963	Sunday in New York	Mona Harris
1964	He Rides Tall	Kate McCloud
1973	Blume in Love	Bar Hostess
1973	Terminal Island	Newswoman
1973	Doctor Death: Seeker of Souls	Laura Sanders
