= Doctor Death: Seeker of Souls =

- Theatrical release poster
- Directed by: Eddie Saeta
- Written by: Sal Ponti
- Produced by: Sal Ponti; Eddie Saeta
- Starring: John Considine; Barry Coe; Cheryl Miller; Stewart Moss; Leon Askin; Jo Morrow
- Cinematography: Emil Oster; Kent L. Wakeford (as Kent Wakeford)
- Edited by: Anthony DiMarco
- Music by: Richard LaSalle
- Production companies: Freedom Arts Pictures Corporation; D. D. Productions
- Distributed by: Cinerama Releasing Corporation
- Release date: October 1973
- Running time: 89 minutes
- Country: United States
- Language: English

Doctor Death: Seeker of Souls is a 1973 American horror film directed by Eddie Saeta and starring John Considine, Barry Coe, Cheryl Miller, Stewart Moss, Leon Askin, and Jo Morrow. The filming location was in Aldrich Studios, Los Angeles, California.The film was released by Cinerama Releasing Corporation in October 1973.

== Plot ==
A one-thousand-year-old magician learns the secret of prolonging his life indefinitely by transferring the souls of unwilling young people into himself. He decides to target a specific young man and his wife. Moe Howard (of the Three Stooges) appears as a volunteer in the audience watching the magician's act.

== Cast ==
- John Considine as Dr. Death
- Barry Coe as Fred Saunders
- Cheryl Miller as Sandy
- Stewart Moss as Greg Vaughn
- Leon Askin as Thor
- Jo Morrow as Laura Saunders
- Florence Marly as Tana
- Sivi Aberg as Venus
- Jim Boles as Caretaker Franz
- Athena Lorde as Spiritualist
- Moe Howard as Volunteer in the Audience (final film)
- Larry Vincent as The Strangler (as Larry 'Seymour' Vincent)

== Release ==
The film was released on October 1973 and was received as a camp, low-budget horror film with an over-the-top, quirky tone that emphasises graphic special effects and memorable, gruesome moments rather than genuine scares. Reviewers often draw attention to its unusual scenes and note the appearance of Moe Howard from The Three Stooges in one of his final roles.

== Home media ==
The film was released on DVD by Cinerama on January 26, 2010.

== Reception ==
Ian Jane from DVD Talk gave the film a positive review, writing, "Doctor Death is a whole lot of fun. It's campy and spends much of its running time with tongue placed firmly in cheek but Considine's performance is great and as predictable as the whole thing might be, it's ridiculously entertaining." Andrew Pragasam from The Spinning Image awarded the film 4/10 stars, calling it "trashy nonsense". TV Guide gave the film 1/5 stars, writing "Overall, this is a pretty bad effort, but camp fans may get some satisfaction from the cameo appearances by former Stooge Moe Howard and TV horror host Larry "Seymour" Vincent."
