= Follow the Sun (TV series) =

American adventure TV series (1961–62)

- Genre: Adventure fiction
- Starring: Barry Coe; Brett Halsey; Gary Lockwood; Gigi Perreau; Jay Lanin
- Country of origin: United States
- Original language: English
- No. of seasons: 1
- No. of episodes: 30

Production
- Producers: Roy Huggins; Marion Hargrove
- Running time: 60 minutes
- Production company: 20th Century Fox Television

Original release
- Network: ABC
- Release: September 17, 1961 – April 8, 1962

Follow the Sun is an American television adventure series that aired on ABC from September 17, 1961, to April 8, 1962. The episodes follow a pair of freelance magazine writers based in Hawaii who seek out interesting stories while leading an active social life both on the mainland and aboard their boat, The Scuber. The series is characterized by a host of guest appearances by popular film and television actors.

Dell Comics issued a contemporaneous series of comic books based on the show in 1961 and 1962.

== Production ==
The series was co-produced by Roy Huggins and Marion Hargrove at 20th Century Fox. The plotline was designed as a follow-up to Hong Kong, which Huggins had lately produced, "with two freelance journalists based in Honolulu encountering mystery and their fair share of beautiful women in their weekly Hawaiian adventures". Hargrove left the project after the fifth episode and Huggins reworked the cast list, downgrading Gary Lockwood from one of the reporters to a scout, and upgrading Brett Halsey to the journalist position. Huggins also began alternating the episodes to star one or the other of the two lead characters.

== Cast ==
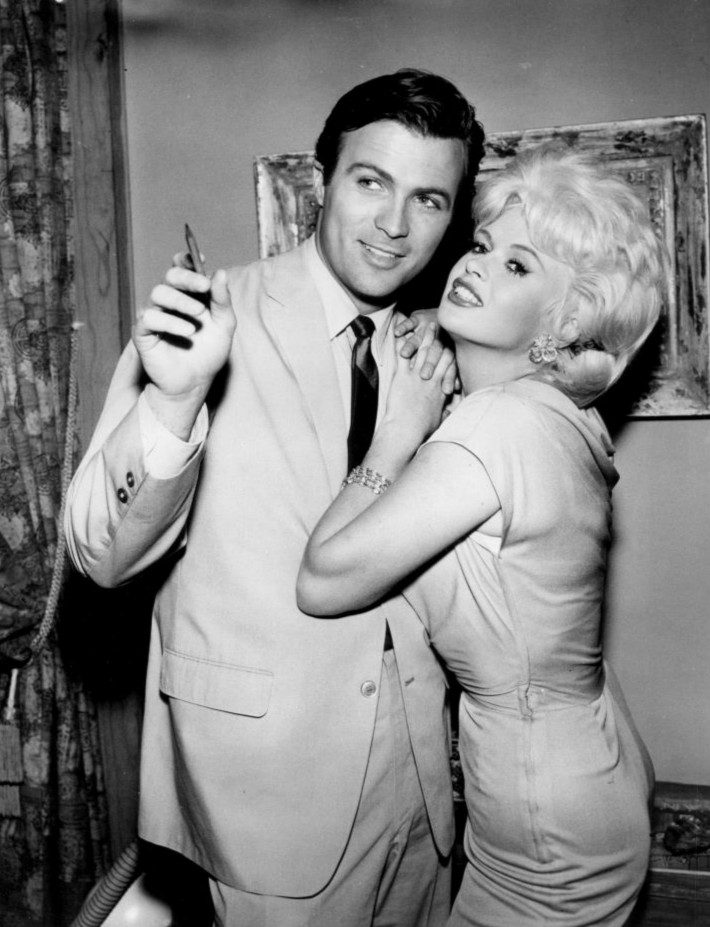
Barry Coe with guest star Jayne Mansfield in 1962

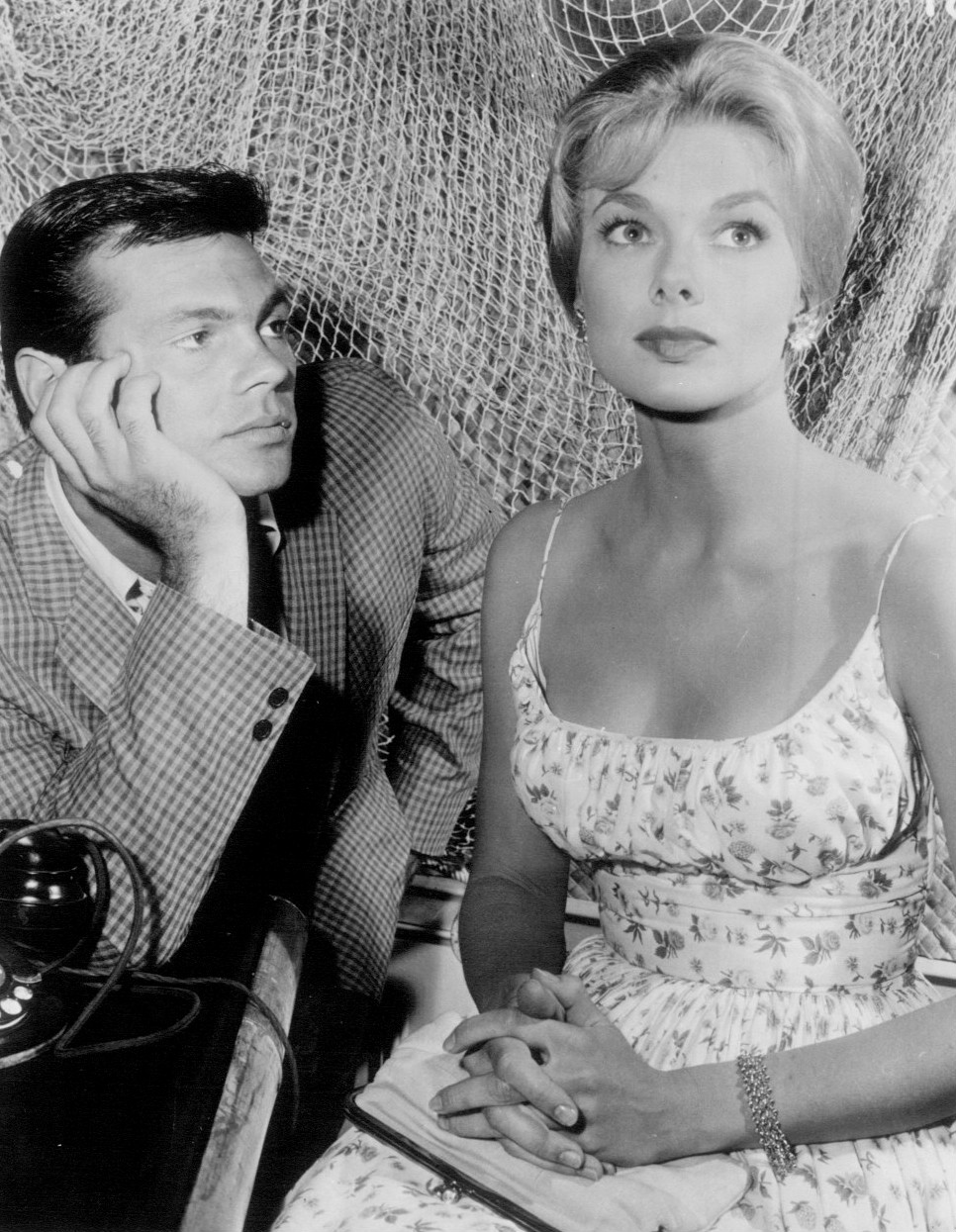
Gary Lockwood with guest star Leslie Parrish in 1962

- Barry Coe as Ben Gregory
- Brett Halsey as Paul Templin
- Gary Lockwood as Eric Jason
- Gigi Perreau as Katherine Ann Richards
- Jay Lanin as Lt. Frank Roper

== Episodes ==
| No. | Title | Directed by | Written by | Original release date |
|---|---|---|---|---|
| 1 | "A Rage for Justice" | Jules Bricken | Story by : Thomas Fitzroy; Teleplay by : Howard Browne & Toby Benjamin | September 17, 1961 |
| 2 | "Cry Fraud" | Francis D. Lyon | Story by : Sheldon Stark; Teleplay by : Howard Browne & Jay Simms | September 24, 1961 |
| 3 | "The Highest Wall" | Ted Post | Story by : Thomas Fitzroy; Teleplay by : Ellis Kadison | October 1, 1961 |
| 4 | "Journey Into Darkness" | Gilbert Kay | Teleplay by : Elmer M. Parsons & Roy Huggins | October 8, 1961 |
| 5 | "The Woman Who Never Was" | Felix E. Feist | Teleplay by : Howard Browne & Thomas Fitzroy; Based on a Play by Leonard Lee | October 15, 1961 |
| 6 | "Busman's Holiday" | Mitchell Leisen | Dean Riesner | October 22, 1961 |
| 7 | "Another Part of the Jungle" | Francis D. Lyon | Story by : Anthony Wilson; Teleplay by : Howard Browne & Ron Alexander | October 29, 1961 |
| 8 | "The Longest Crap Game in History" | Felix E. Feist | Albert Beich | November 5, 1961 |
| 9 | "The Hunters" | Francis D. Lyon | Howard Browne & Jonathan Hughes | November 12, 1961 |
| 10 | "Little Girl Lost" | Ted Post | Story by : John Whittier; Teleplay by : Ellis Kadison | November 19, 1961 |
| 11 | "Night Song" | Felix E. Feist | Harold Jack Bloom | November 26, 1961 |
| 12 | "The Primitive Clay" | Richard L. Bare | Story by : Palmer Thompson; Teleplay by : Palmer Thompson & Ellis Kadison | December 3, 1961 |
| 13 | "Conspiracy of Silence" | Ted Post | George W. George & Judy George | December 10, 1961 |
| 14 | "The Far End of Nowhere" | Don Taylor | A.J. Carothers | December 17, 1961 |
| 15 | "Mele Kalikimaka to You" | Mitchell Leisen | Edwin Blum | December 24, 1961 |
| 16 | "The Girl From the Brandenburg Gate" | Felix E. Feist | Story by : Fritz Von Koenig; Teleplay by : Judith Friedman | December 31, 1961 |
| 17 | "Chicago Style" | Unknown | Edwin Blum | January 7, 1962 |
| 18 | "The Last of the Big Spenders" | Robert Butler | Ellis Kadison | January 14, 1962 |
| 19 | "Ghost Story" | Felix E. Feist | Orville H. Hampton | January 21, 1962 |
| 20 | "Sergeant Kolchak Fades Away" | Jacques Tourneur | Gene L. Coon | January 28, 1962 |
| 21 | "The Dumbest Blonde" | Robert Butler | Donn Mullally | February 4, 1962 |
| 22 | "Annie Beeler's Place" | Felix E. Feist | Albert Beich | February 11, 1962 |
| 23 | "The Irresistible Miss Bullfinch" | Robert Butler | Ellis Kadison | February 18, 1962 |
| 24 | "A Choice of Weapons" | Alexander Singer | George W. George & Judy George | February 25, 1962 |
| 25 | "Marine of the Month" | Unknown | Unknown | March 4, 1962 |
| 26 | "The Inhuman Equation" | Jack Donohue | Story by : Tony Wilson; Teleplay by : David Harmon | March 11, 1962 |
| 27 | "A Ghost in Her Gazebo" | Leonard Horn | Story by : Robert Presnell, Jr. & Donn Mullally; Teleplay by : Donn Mullally | March 18, 1962 |
| 28 | "Not Aunt Charlotte!" | Unknown | Erna Lazarus | March 25, 1962 |
| 29 | "Run, Clown, Run" | Justus Addiss | Story by : William Froug & Michael Patrick Casey; Teleplay by : William Froug | April 1, 1962 |
| 30 | "Chalk One Up for Johnny" | Leonard Horn | Ellis Kadison | April 8, 1962 |

== Guest stars ==
The series featured guest appearances by many popular film and television stars, including:

- Yvonne Craig
- James Dunn
- Bill Erwin
- Anne Helm
- David Janssen
- Sue Ane Langdon
- Julie London
- Jayne Mansfield
- Gregory Morton

== Sources ==
- Brooks, Tim; Marsh, Earle F. (2009). The Complete Directory to Prime Time Network and Cable TV Shows, 1946-Present. Random House. ISBN 9780307483201.
- Green, Paul (2014). Roy Huggins: Creator of Maverick, 77 Sunset Strip, The Fugitive and The Rockford Files. McFarland. ISBN 9781476613499.
- Lisanti, Tom (2015b). Drive-in Dream Girls: A Galaxy of B-Movie Starlets of the Sixties. McFarland. ISBN 9780786493425.
- Lisanti, Tom (2015a). Glamour Girls of Sixties Hollywood: Seventy-Five Profiles. McFarland. ISBN 9781476612416.
- Owen, Michael (2017). Go Slow: The Life of Julie London. Chicago Review Press. ISBN 9781613738597.
- Terrace, Vincent (2014). Encyclopedia of Television Shows, 1925 through 2010 (2nd ed.). McFarland. ISBN 9780786486410.
