= Lee Farr =

American actor (1927–2017)

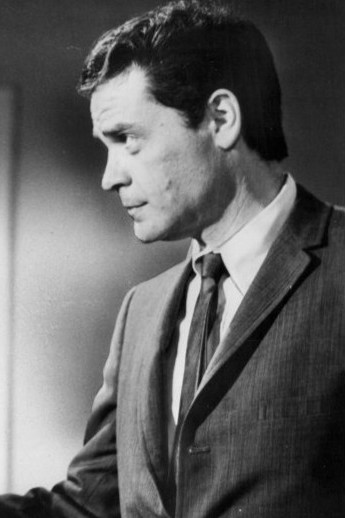
- Farr in a network publicity photo for the 1967 episode of The Invaders titled "Doomsday Minus One"
- Born: Leon Farb; April 10, 1927; New York City, New York, U.S.
- Died: March 23, 2017 (aged 89); Woodland Hills, Los Angeles, California, U.S.
- Resting place: Mount Sinai Memorial Park Cemetery
- Occupation: Actor
- Spouse: Felicia Farr (m. 1949; div. 1955)
- Children: 1

Lee Farr (born Leon Farb; April 10, 1927 – March 23, 2017) was an American actor best known for his starring role as Lt. Jimmy Conway in the television series The Detectives during the 1950s and 1960s.

== Early years ==
Farr was born Leon Farb in New York on April 10, 1927, to Rose (née Draisin) Farb and Jacob Farb, a photographer. He was raised in Brooklyn and graduated from Boys High School in the borough's Bedford–Stuyvesant neighborhood. He enlisted in the United States Navy before enrolling at Penn State University, where he received a bachelor's degree in geophysics. While at Penn State, he took some acting courses and acted in school plays.

== Career ==
Farr began his career as a geologist before transitioning to acting.

He appeared in The Detectives' first season. His other television work from the 1950 to the 1970s also included appearances on Perry Mason, Bonanza, Lassie, Mission: Impossible, The Rifleman, Laramie, Trackdown and M Squad. His film credits included Thundering Jets in 1958, Tarawa Beachhead in 1958, Lone Texan in 1959, and Gunfighters of Abilene in 1960.

== Death ==
Farr died from cancer at his home in the Woodland Hills neighborhood of Los Angeles, California, on March 23, 2017, at the age of 89. He was survived by his daughter, Denise Farr (wife of actor Don Gordon), whom he had with his first wife, actress Felicia Farr. He was predeceased by his sister, Lottie Kelban, and his half-brothers, Abe Caroff and Dave Caroff.

== Filmography ==
Year	Title	Role	Notes
1958	The True Story of Lynn Stuart	Ben	Uncredited
1958	Thundering Jets	Capt. Murphy	
1958	Tarawa Beachhead	Sgt. Anderson – Marine Photographer	Uncredited
1959	Lone Texan	Riff	
1959	Gunfighters of Abilene	Jud Hainline	
1961	The Rifleman	Carl Avery	
1964	Perry Mason	Randolph James	
