= Carl Reindel =

American actor

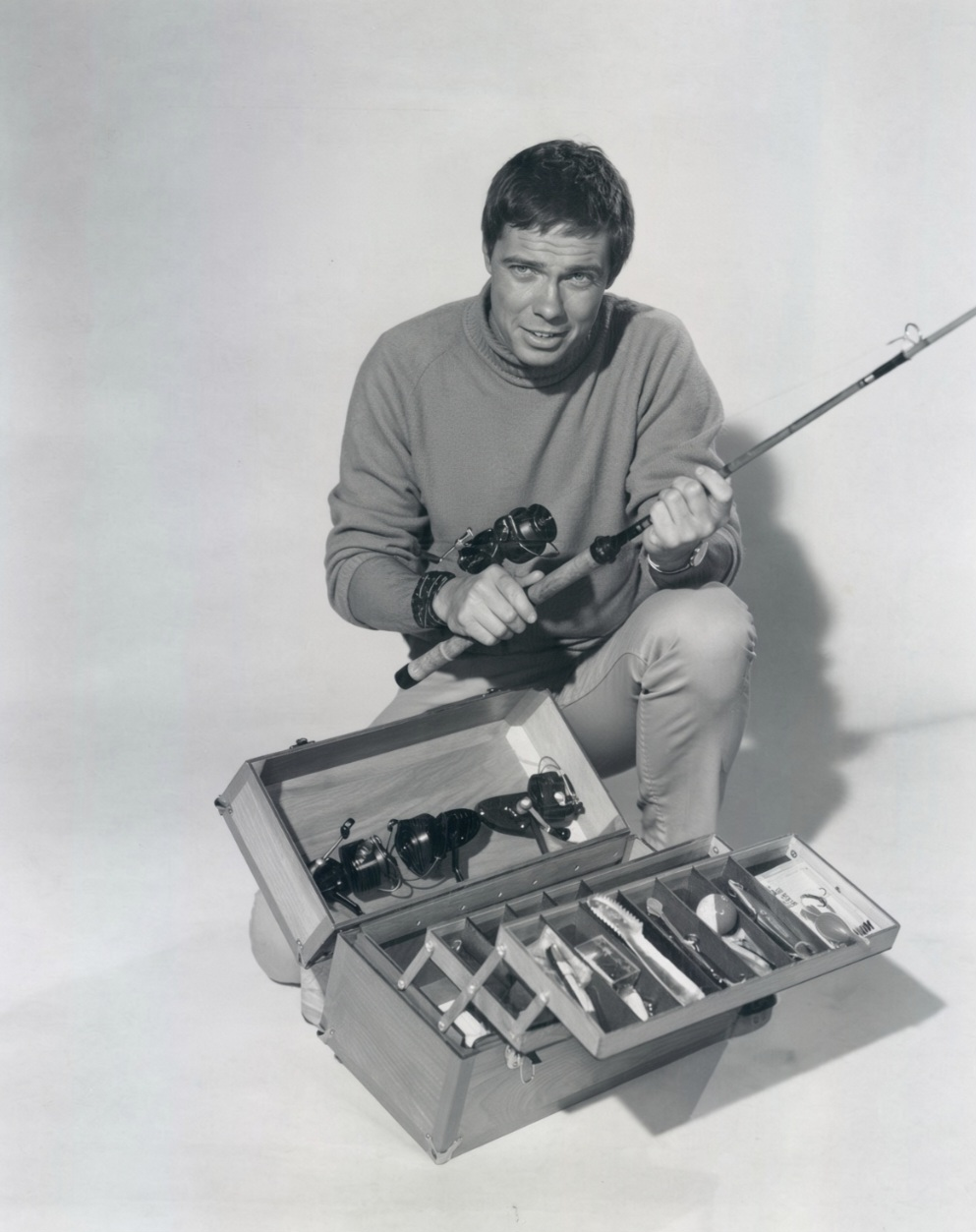
- Reindel in 1974
- Born: January 20, 1935; Philadelphia, Pennsylvania, U.S.
- Died: September 4, 2009 (aged 74); Valley Village, California, U.S.
- Occupation: Actor
- Years active: 1960–1981

Carl Warren Reindel (January 20, 1935 – September 4, 2009) was an American actor, who was known for portraying Lieutenant Kenneth M. Taylor in the epic war film Tora! Tora! Tora!.

== Formative years ==
Carl was born in Philadelphia, Pennsylvania on January 20, 1935.

== Career ==
Reidel appeared in plays such as Babes in Arms, I Married an Angel, Guys and Dolls, and Tchin-Tchin.

He made several appearances on popular television series. In 1964, he appeared on Perry Mason as the defendant and title character, Barry Davis, in "The Case of the Drifting Dropout" and in 1966 he played golf caddy and murderer Danny Bright in "The Case of the Golfer's Gambit."

In 1966, Episode 25, on the series, Gidget, he played Scott Baker, a paid watchful eye, to make sure Gidget was safe on a weekend away at a surfboard competition. He also appeared on Gunsmoke (S7E31 - "Cale"), as the title named young cowboy set on doing things his way, but usually for good. He reprised his role of Cale in the S8E1 of Gunsmoke, suspected as a horse thief.The F.B.I., Bonanza, The Virginian (as Carl Reindell) and Voyage to the Bottom of the Sea and also played the son of a man bent on vengeance on the western series Wagon Train before leaving show business in the early 1980s.

In 1968 he played "Mike" in Elvis Presley's Speedway and "Stanton" in Steve McQueen's hit film Bullitt.

== Death ==
Reindel died from a heart attack at the age of 74, on September 4, 2009, in Valley Village, Los Angeles.

== TV and filmography ==
- Naked City (TV series, 1961) - Shag
- The New Breed (TV series, 1962) - Gene Garrity
- Cheyenne (TV, 1962) - Terry 'Billy' Brown
- Rawhide (TV, 1962) - Ben Whitney
- The Virginian (TV, 1962) - Bruce McCallum
- Gunsmoke (TV series, 1962–1965) - Cale / Dave Carson / Emmett Calhoun
- Bonanza (TV series, 1962–1970) - Frank Wells / Andrew 'Andy' Buchanan / Billy Horn (3 episodes)
- Dr. Kildare (TV series, 1963) - Joe Sartell
- Laramie (TV series, 1963) - Cass
- GE True (TV series, 1963) - Doug Tolliver
- 77 Sunset Strip (TV series, 1963) - Paul Atwell
- Wagon Train (TV series, 1963) - Adam Bancroft
- He Rides Tall (1964) - Gil McCloud
- Voyage to the Bottom of the Sea (TV, 1964) - Evans
- Perry Mason (TV, 1964–1966) - Danny Bright / Barry Davis
- The Dick Van Dyke Show (TV series, 1965) - Gus
- Combat! (TV series, 1966) - Pvt. Murray
- 12 O'Clock High (TV series, 1966) - Lieutenant Dickey
- Gidget (TV series, 1966) - Scott
- Death Valley Days (TV, 1966) - Jack Desmond / Jim Bridger
- Follow Me, Boys! (1966) - Tank Captain (uncredited)
- Shane (TV series, 1966) - Jed Andrews
- The F.B.I. (TV series, 1966–1968) - Roy Carey / Bobby Hendricks / Gene Black
- The Fugitive (TV series, 1967) - Assistant
- The Mothers-in-Law (TV series, 1967) - Golf Starter
- Speedway (1968) - Mike
- Bullitt (1968) - Carl Stanton
- Ironside (TV series, 1968–1970) - Bobby Patterson / Richy Bolton
- The Thousand Plane Raid (1969) - Bombardier (uncredited)
- The Gypsy Moths (1969) - Pilot
- Adam-12 (TV series, 1969) - Mark Gurney
- The New People (TV series, 1969) - Dan Stoner
- Medical Center (TV series, 1969–1970) - Dr. Sam Hauser
- The Young Lawyers (TV series, 1970) - Ernie Blake
- The Cheyenne Social Club (1970) - Pete Dodge
- Tora! Tora! Tora! (1970) - Lieutenant Kenneth M. Taylor
- The Most Deadly Game (TV series, 1971) - Jed
- The Psychiatrist (TV series, 1971) - Larry
- The Andromeda Strain (1971) - Lt. Comroe
- The Forgotten Man (1971, TV Movie) - Lieutenant Diamonte
- Gemini Man (TV mini-series, 1976) - 8nd Agent
- The Six Million Dollar Man (TV series, 1977) - Jensen
- Quincy, M.E. (TV series, 1980) - Roger
- Buck Rogers in the 25th Century (TV series, 1981) - Air Force Sergeant (final appearance)
