= The Cat (1966 film) =

1966 film

- Theatrical release poster
- Directed by: Ellis Kadison
- Written by: Laird Koenig; William Redlin
- Produced by: Ellis Kadison
- Starring: Roger Perry; Peggy Ann Garner; Barry Coe; Dwayne Redlin; Ted Derby; Shug Fisher
- Cinematography: Monroe P. Askins
- Edited by: Arthur Cornell
- Music by: Stan Worth
- Production company: World-Cine Associates Production
- Distributed by: Embassy Pictures
- Release date: June 1966
- Running time: 87 minutes
- Country: United States
- Language: English

The Cat is a 1966 American adventure film directed by Ellis Kadison and written by Laird Koenig and William Redlin. The film stars Roger Perry, Peggy Ann Garner, Barry Coe, Dwayne Redlin, Ted Derby, and Shug Fisher. The film was released in June 1966 by Embassy Pictures.

== Cast ==
- Roger Perry as Pete Kilby
- Peggy Ann Garner as Susan Kilby
- Barry Coe as Walt Kilby
- Dwayne Redlin as Toby
- Ted Derby as Art
- Shug Fisher as Bill Krim
- Richard Webb as Sheriff Vern
- Leslie Bradley as Deputy Mike
- John Todd Roberts as Jesse
