= Felicia Farr =

American actress (born 1932)

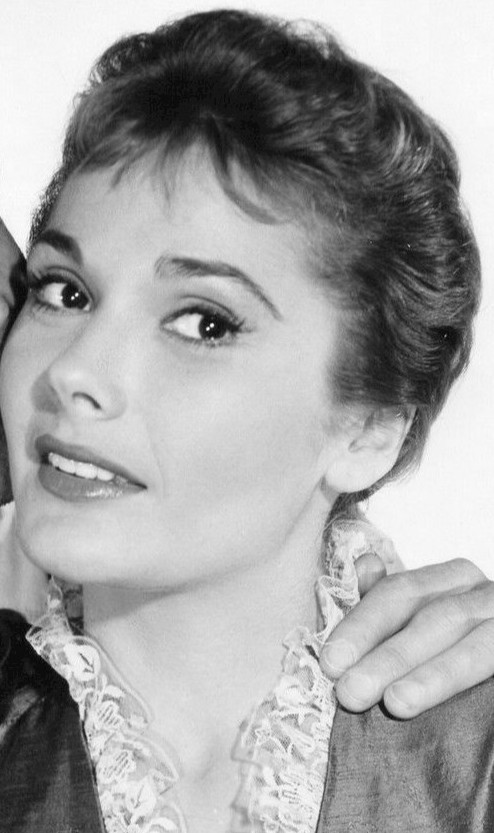
- Farr in the Playhouse 90 presentation of "Natchez", 1958
- Born: Olive Dines; October 4, 1932 (age 93); Westchester County, New York, U.S.
- Other names: Randy Farr, Olive Farr
- Occupations: Actress, model
- Years active: 1947–2014
- Spouses: Lee Farr (m. 1949; div. 1955) Jack Lemmon (m. 1962; died 2001)
- Children: 2

Felicia Farr (born Olive Dines; October 4, 1932) is an American former actress and model.

== Early years ==
Farr was born in Westchester County, New York. She attended Erasmus Hall High School and studied sociology at Pennsylvania State University.

== Career ==
Farr began modeling lingerie at age 15. In 1955, she told a wire-service reporter: "I was under age and over-developed...The agency claimed I was 19 because a state law required underage lingerie models to be chaperoned".

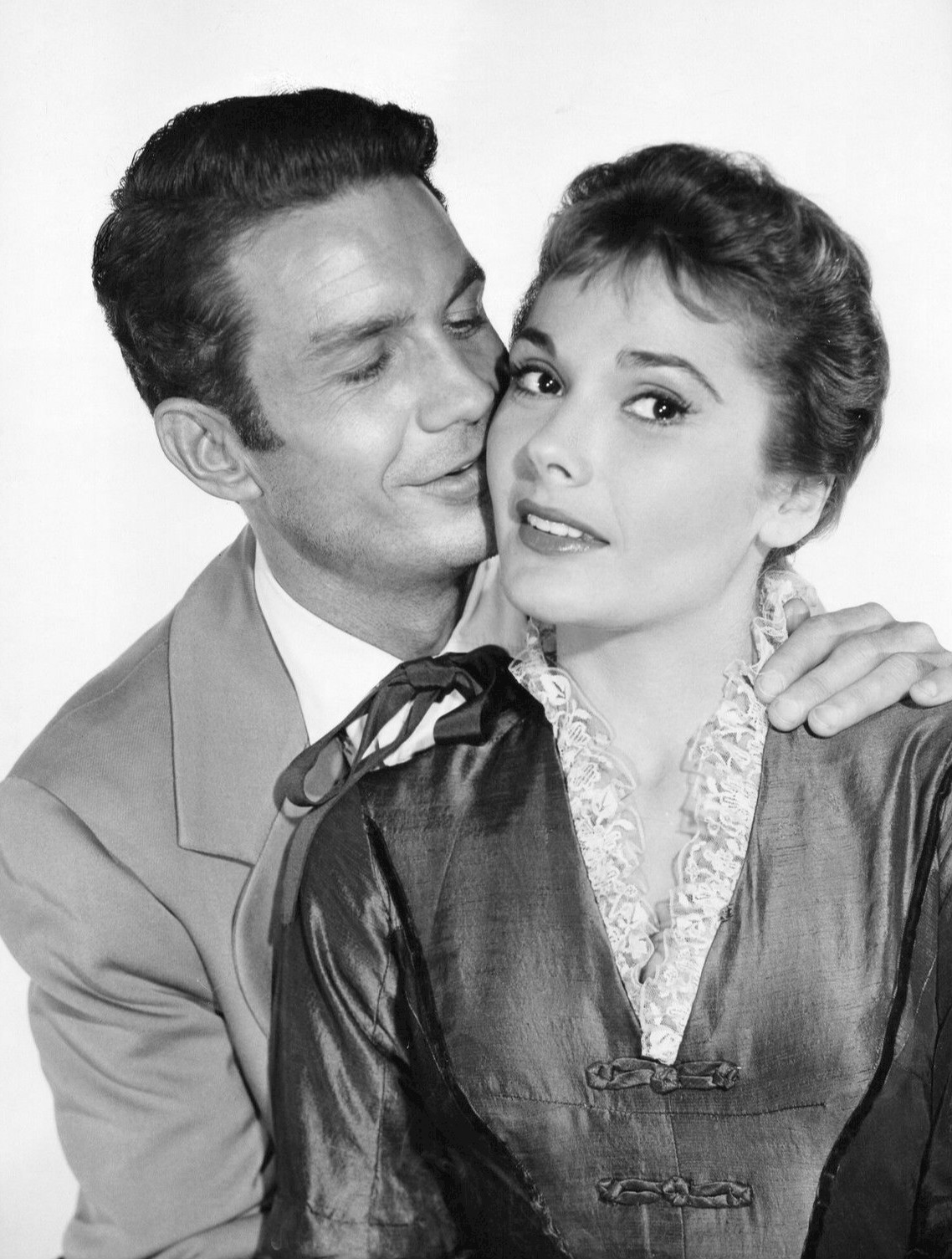
Cliff Robertson and Farr in the Playhouse 90 presentation of "Natchez", 1958

She appeared in several modeling photo shoots and advertisements during the 1950s and 1960s. In 1955, she signed a seven-year contract with Columbia Pictures.

Her early screen appearances date from the mid-1950s, including three westerns directed by Delmer Daves: Jubal (1956) and 3:10 to Yuma (1957), both starring Glenn Ford, and The Last Wagon (1956), starring Richard Widmark.

Her later film appearances include the bawdy Billy Wilder farce Kiss Me, Stupid (1964) with Dean Martin and Ray Walston as her husband (a role intended for Jack Lemmon); Walter Matthau's daughter-in-law in Kotch (1971) (Lemmon's only film as director); and the Don Siegel bank-heist caper Charley Varrick (1973) with Matthau.

Farr had more than 30 TV appearances on The Alfred Hitchcock Hour, Wagon Train, Bonanza, Ben Casey, Burke's Law, Harry O, and other series.

== Personal life ==
On September 2, 1949, she married actor Lee Farr, a marriage which produced a daughter, Denise Farr, who later became the wife of actor Don Gordon. Farr's second husband was actor Jack Lemmon; they married in 1962 when Lemmon was filming the comedy Irma La Douce in Paris. They remained married until his death in 2001.

During her marriage to Jack Lemmon, Farr gave birth to a daughter, Courtney, in 1966. She is also the stepmother of Lemmon's son, actor and author Chris Lemmon, from his first marriage.

== Filmography ==
Year	Title	Role
1955	Big House, U.S.A.	Emily Evans
1956	Jubal	Naomi Hoktor
1956	Time Table	Linda Brucker
1956	The Last Wagon	Jenny
1956	Reprisal!	Catherine Cantrell
1956	The First Texan	Katherine Delaney
1957	3:10 to Yuma	Emmy
1958	Onionhead	Stella Papparonis
1960	Hell Bent for Leather	Janet Gifford
1964	Kiss Me, Stupid	Zelda
1967	The Venetian Affair	Claire Connor
1971	Kotch	Wilma Kotcher
1973	Charley Varrick	Sybil Fort
1986	That's Life!	Madame Carrie
1992	The Player	herself
2014	Loser's Crown	Mrs. Phelps

== Selected television appearances ==
- Wayfarers (1960)
- Naked City (1960, season 2, episode 3: "A Succession of Heartbeats") as June Waldon
- Wagon Train (1961, season 4, episode 33: "The Eleanor Culhane Story") as Eleanor Culhane
- Target: The Corruptors! (1961, season 1, episode 4: "The Invisible Government") as Ronnie Dale (uncredited)
- Ben Casey (1962, season 2, episode 3: "In the Name of Love, a Small Corruption") as Rowena Dirkson
- The Defenders (1962, season 2, episode 8: "The Bigamist") as Mildred Janos
- Bonanza (1963, season 4, episode 20: "Marie, My Love") as Marie DeMarigny
- The Alfred Hitchcock Hour (1964, season 2, episode 15: "Night Caller") as Marcia Fowler
- Burke's Law (1964, season 1, episode 23: "Who Killed Avery Lord?") as Whitney Kelly
- Bob Hope Presents the Chrysler Theatre (1965, season 2, episodes 20 and 21: "Memorandum for a Spy" parts 1 and 2) as Jemy
- Run for Your Life (1967, season 3, episode 15: "Fly by Night") as Alita Greenley
- It Takes a Thief (1970, season 3, episode 16: "The Steal-Driving Man") as Corey Laughton
- Awake and Sing! (1972, TV movie) as Hennie
