= Barry Coe =

American actor (1934–2019)

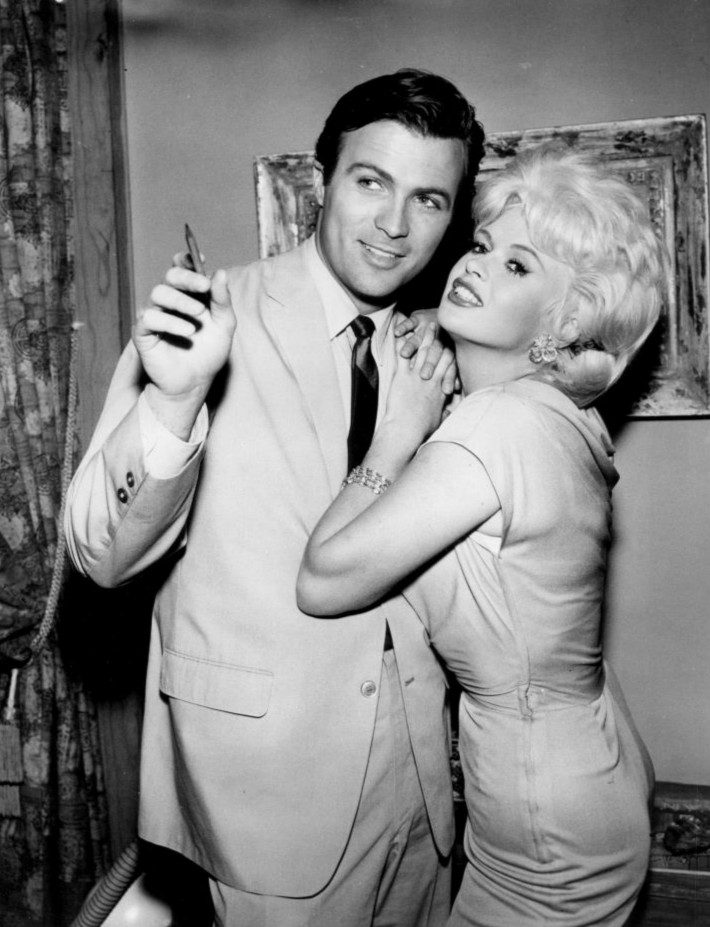
- Coe and Jayne Mansfield in 1962
- Born: Barry Clark Heacock; November 26, 1934; Santa Monica, California, U.S.
- Died: July 16, 2019 (aged 84); Palm Desert, California, U.S.
- Other names: Joseph Spalding Coe
- Occupation: Actor
- Years active: 1955–78
- Spouse: Jorunn Kristiansen Coe (1959–2019; his death)
- Children: 2

Barry S. Coe (born Barry Clark Heacock; November 26, 1934 – July 16, 2019) was an American actor who appeared in film and on television from 1956 to 1978. Many of his movie parts were minor, but he co-starred in one series, titled Follow the Sun, which aired on ABC during the 1961–62 season. He also played "Mr. Goodwrench" on TV commercials in the 1970s and 1980s.

== Life and career ==
=== Early life ===
Born Barry Clark Heacock, his name was changed to Joseph Spalding Coe when his mother, Jean Elizabeth Shea, married Joseph Spalding Coe in 1940 in Los Angeles. His father, Francis Elmer "Frank" Heacock, a writer and publicist for Warner Bros., was killed in an auto accident in North Hollywood, California, on April 5, 1940. Coe attended the University of Southern California and was discovered by a talent scout during a trip with his fraternity to Palm Springs in the mid-1950s. He was signed by 20th Century Fox.

=== 20th Century Fox ===
Coe's early film roles included appearances in House of Bamboo (1955), How to Be Very, Very Popular (1955), On the Threshold of Space (1956), and D-Day the Sixth of June (1956). He had a small role in Elvis Presley's Love Me Tender (1956). He was in adaptations of The Late George Apley and Deep Water for The 20th Century Fox Hour.

Coe's first really notable role was playing the lustful Rodney Harrington in Peyton Place (1957), based on the best-selling Grace Metalious 1956 novel of the same name. This was followed by a supporting part in Thundering Jets (1958), then went back to Fox for The Bravados (1958) with Gregory Peck, and A Private's Affair (1959). He played Carroll Baker's more age-appropriate boyfriend in But Not for Me at Paramount.

Coe had supporting roles in One Foot in Hell (1960) with Alan Ladd and The Wizard of Baghdad (1961). In 1960, he received a Golden Globe for the Most Promising Newcomer - Male, along with James Shigeta, Troy Donahue, and George Hamilton.

=== Follow the Sun ===
In 1961, Coe and Brett Halsey played magazine writers Paul Templin and Ben Gregory, respectively, with Gary Lockwood as Eric Jason, on the ABC television network series Follow the Sun from September 17, 1961, through April 8, 1962. The program was set in Honolulu, Hawaii, and the writers often ventured into private detective work. Despite some memorable episodes, Follow the Sun was cancelled after 29 segments.

After Follow the Sun folded, Coe appeared in a supporting role in Fox's The 300 Spartans (1962) then guest-starred in 1962 on the first episode of the fourth season of Bonanza. He portrayed Clay Stafford, who reveals himself to be the "fourth" Cartwright, a half brother to Little Joe (Michael Landon) via their mother Marie. Although stepfather Ben Cartwright (Lorne Greene) and Joe take Clay at his word, the other Cartwright brothers, Hoss (Dan Blocker) and Adam (Pernell Roberts) are skeptical and intend to investigate Clay's claim. The episode, "The First Born", could have introduced Coe as a new cast member. Entertainment writer Hal Ericson reported that friction (i.e., job security) on the set caused Bonanza producers to stick with the three brothers. Coe guest-starred on Voyage to the Bottom of the Sea and appeared as a communications aide in Fantastic Voyage (1966) and as Walt Kilby in The Cat (1966) and The Seven Minutes (1971). He had a semiregular role on Bracken's World.

=== Later career ===
He starred as Fred Saunders in Doctor Death: Seeker of Souls in 1973 and as a reporter in Gregory Peck's MacArthur in 1977. His last film role was as diving instructor Tom Andrews in Jaws 2 in 1978. He had a brief stint as Dr. Rex Pierce in the soap opera General Hospital in 1974. His other television appearances include Mission: Impossible and The Moneychangers. From the late 1970s into the early 1980s, Coe was "Mr. Goodwrench" in television advertising for General Motors’ passenger vehicle dealer services.

== Personal life and death ==
Until his death, Coe was married to the former Jorunn Kristiansen (born 1940), who was a Norwegian beauty queen in the 1950s and later became a painter. Their son is William Shea Coe (born 1966). In the 1980s, Barry Coe's daughter attended the University of Southern California in Los Angeles. He had a side business in nutritional supplements—Adventures in Nutrition; labels for the containers were printed by Joe Faust. He lived in the Los Angeles neighborhood of Brentwood for several years. Coe died on July 16, 2019, from myelodysplastic syndrome at the age of 84 in Palm Desert, California.

== Filmography ==
Year	Title	Role	Notes
1955	House of Bamboo	Captain Hanson's Aide	Uncredited
1955	How to Be Very, Very Popular	Student	Uncredited
1956	On the Threshold of Space	Communications Officer	
1956	D-Day the Sixth of June	Helmsman	Uncredited
1956	Love Me Tender	Mr. Davis	
1957	Peyton Place	Rodney Harrington	
1958	Thundering Jets	Capt. 'Cotton' Davis	
1958	The Bravados	Tom	
1959	A Private's Affair	Jerry Morgan	
1959	But Not for Me	Gordon Reynolds	
1960	One Foot in Hell	Stu Christian	
1960	The Wizard of Baghdad	Prince Husan	
1962	The 300 Spartans	Phylon	
1965	A Letter to Nancy	Pastor Bob Allen	
1966	The Cat	Walt Kilby	
1966	Fantastic Voyage	Communications Aide	
1971	The Seven Minutes	Court Clerk	Uncredited
1972	One Minute Before Death	Joseph Hudson	
1973	Doctor Death: Seeker of Souls	Fred Saunders	
1976	El hombre desnudo		
1977	MacArthur	Television Reporter	
1978	Jaws 2	Thomas Andrews	(final film role)
