= George Welch (pilot) =

World War II flying ace (1918–1954)

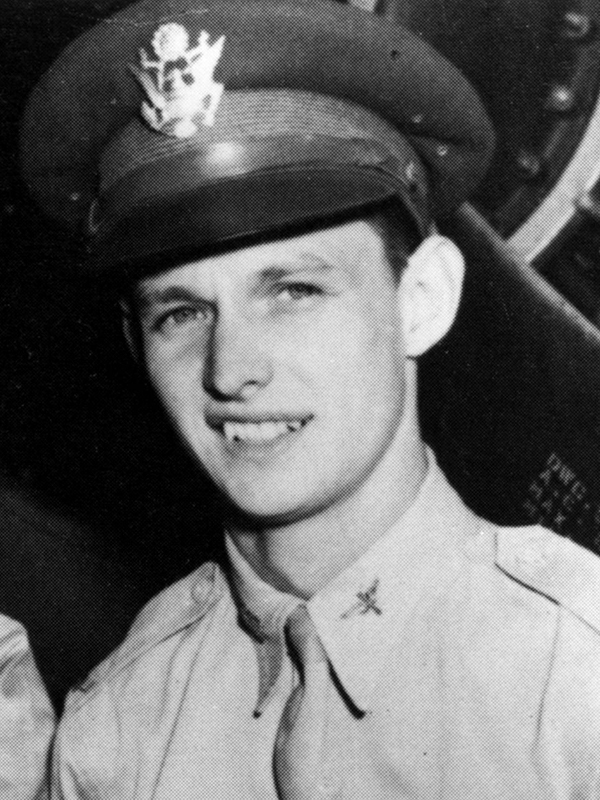
- Born: George Lewis Schwartz, Jr. May 10, 1918; Wawaset Park, Wilmington, Delaware, US
- Died: October 12, 1954 (aged 36); Palmdale, California, US
- Burial place: Arlington National Cemetery
- Military career
- Allegiance: United States
- Branch: United States Army Air Corps; United States Army Air Forces
- Service years: 1939–1944
- Rank: Major
- Units: 47th Fighter Squadron; 36th Fighter Squadron; 80th Fighter Squadron
- Conflicts: World War II; Attack on Pearl Harbor
- Awards: Distinguished Service Cross; Silver Star; Distinguished Flying Cross (3); Air Medal (2)
- Other work: Test pilot

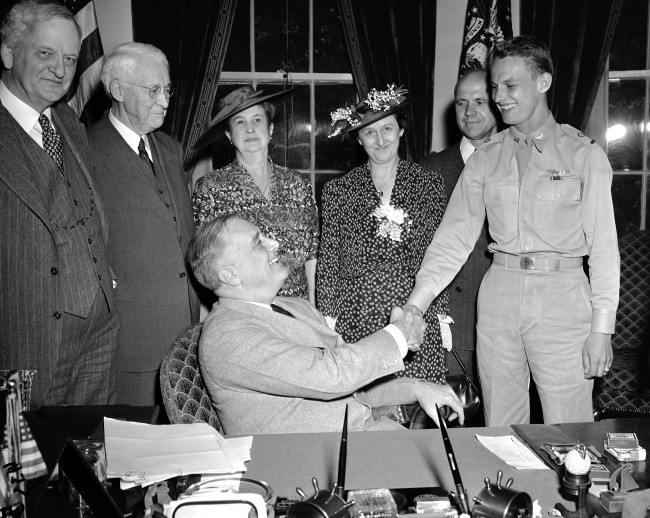
Senator James H. Hughes (D-Del.); Mrs. Hughes; Mrs. Julia Welch Schwartz and Mr. George L. Schwartz, Welch's parents; and Lieutenant Welch shaking hands with President Roosevelt, 1942

George Schwartz Welch (May 10, 1918 – October 12, 1954) was a World War II triple ace, a Distinguished Service Cross recipient, and an experimental aircraft pilot after the war. Welch is best known for having been one of the few United States Army Air Corps fighter pilots able to get airborne to engage Japanese forces in the attack on Pearl Harbor and for his work as a test pilot. Welch resigned from the United States Army Air Forces as a major in 1944, and became a test pilot for North American Aviation.

== Early life ==
George Schwartz Welch was born George Lewis Schwartz, Jr. to George Lewis Schwartz, Sr. (November 15, 1887 – May 30, 1972) and Julia Ann Welch (April 29, 1891 – May 21, 1974), but his parents changed his name to avoid the anti-German sentiment that stemmed from World War I. His father was a senior research chemist for Dupont Experimental Test Station at Wilmington, Delaware. He had a younger brother named Dehn Schwartz Welch (March 31, 1920 – November 1, 1999) who served with the U.S. Army from 1941 to 1945. He attended St. Andrew's School (1936). He completed three years of a mechanical engineering degree from Purdue University, before joining the Army Air Corps in 1939. While attending Purdue, he was initiated as a brother of Delta Upsilon. USAAC flight training schools that he attended included: Brooks Field, Kelly Field and Randolph Field in San Antonio, Texas, as well as Hamilton Field in Novato, California.

== World War II ==
After receiving his wings and commission in January 1941, Welch was posted to the 47th Pursuit Squadron, 15th Pursuit Group, at Wheeler Field, Oahu, Hawaii in February 1941.

At dawn on December 7, 1941, 2nd Lieutenant Welch and another pilot, 2nd Lieutenant Kenneth M. Taylor, were coming back from a Christmas dinner and dance party at a rooftop hotel in Waikiki, that ended in an all-night poker game. They were still wearing mess dress when the Japanese attacked Pearl Harbor. Welch telephoned the auxiliary Haleiwa Fighter Strip on Oahu's North Shore to have two Curtiss P-40B Tomahawk fighters prepared for takeoff. Taylor immediately drove his Buick at high speed to Haleiwa to join the air battle. While climbing into their P-40s, the crew chiefs informed them that they should disperse their planes. "To hell with that", Welch said.

Taking off with only .30-cal ammunition in the wing guns, Welch claimed two kills of Aichi D3A Val dive bombers over Ewa Mooring Mast Field. The first Japanese aircraft was only damaged and made it back to its carrier, while the second was finished off by Ken Taylor, shortly before he landed at Wheeler Field to get .50-cal ammo for his two cowl guns. On his second sortie, Welch shot down a Val (which was behind Ken Taylor, and crashed in the community of Wahiawa) then one Mitsubishi Zero fighter about 5 miles west of Barbers Point.

Both Welch and Taylor were nominated for the Medal of Honor by General Henry H. Arnold, but were awarded the Distinguished Service Cross, the second-highest US Army medal for valor, for their actions.

After Pearl Harbor, Welch returned to the continental United States to give war bond speeches until being assigned to the 36th Fighter Squadron of the 8th Fighter Group in New Guinea. Despite his aerial victories on December 7, 1941, Welch was dissatisfied with flying the poorly performing Bell P-39 Airacobra. Welch shot down a Zero and two Aichi D3A “Val” dive bombers on December 7, 1942, the first anniversary of Pearl Harbor. When asked by a journalist what aspect of the P-39 he liked, then seven-victory ace George Welch said, "Well, it's got 1200 pounds of Allison armor plate." This was a reference to the center-mounted engine (i.e.: behind the cockpit) rather than to actual armor plating. When Welch inquired as to when his squadron (the 36th FS) would receive Lockheed P-38 Lightnings, he was told, "When we run out of P-39s." He repeatedly appealed to be assigned to the 80th Fighter Squadron (which flew P-38s) until he was granted a transfer. Between June 21 and September 2, 1943, flying a P-38H, Welch shot down nine more Japanese aircraft: two Zeros, three Ki-61 Tonys, three Ki-43 Oscars, and one Ki-46 Dinah. Welch flew three combat tours (a total of 348 combat missions with 16 confirmed victories, all achieved in multiples) before malaria brought an end to his time in combat.

== Mach 1 claim ==
In the spring of 1944, Welch was approached by North American Aviation to become a company test pilot. With the recommendation of General Arnold, Welch resigned his commission in the United States Army Air Forces and accepted the job; his rank was as a major in the Air Reserve 13 November 1944 to 1 April 1953. He went on to fly the prototypes of the Navy's North American FJ-1 and later the Army Air Forces' XP-86. North American originally proposed a straight-wing version of the XP-86 and the Army Air Forces accepted this on May 1, 1945. On November 1, North American, with the aid of captured German technology, proposed and was given permission for a major redesign of the XP-86 to a 35-degree, swept-wing configuration. This was new technology and the USA's first high-speed, swept-wing airplane and a significant advance over Republic Aviation's XP-84. Welch was chosen as chief test pilot for the project.

In September 1947, the first of three XP-86 prototypes (AAF Ser. No. 45-59597) was moved from North American's Mines Field (later Los Angeles International Airport) to the Muroc North Base test facility (now Edwards AFB), the same base at which the Bell X-1 was being tested. The maiden flight (Note: See Sabre Pilots Association web site for this and other articles related to the XP-86 and F-86 aircraft.) of the XP-86 was on October 1, 1947, flown by Welch.

After about a 30-minute flight, Welch lowered the flaps and gear to land. At this point, the nose gear would not extend completely. For 40 minutes, Welch unsuccessfully tried everything to extend the nose gear. When he reached a low-fuel state, he elected to land on Muroc Lake Bed without a fully extended nose gear. Upon touchdown, in a nose-high attitude, Welch cut the engine, and as the XP-86 slowed, the nose gear snapped down and locked. The aircraft was undamaged.

Secretary of the Air Force (Note: The United States Air Force became an independent branch of the U. S. military on September 18, 1947.) Stuart Symington had instructed North American that they were not, under any circumstances, to break the sound barrier before the X-1 achieved this milestone. He could exercise his authority in this regard because both the XP-86 and X-1 were Air Force programs. Welch's only complaints about the aircraft was the J35 engine lacked power and the rate of climb was only a disappointing 4,000 ft (1,200 m) per minute. North American, however, had already contracted with General Electric for more powerful J47 engines for the production P-86As.

In his book Aces Wild: The Race for Mach 1 (1998), fellow North American test pilot Al Blackburn speculates that Welch may have broken the sound barrier two weeks before Chuck Yeager in an early flight of the XP-86 prototype. Welch himself never made that claim. Blackburn based his contention on interviews of eyewitnesses, former North American employees, and access to contemporary historical accounts. Robert Kempel, author of The Race For Mach 1 contradicts the claim, contending for Welch's aircraft to break the sound barrier with an underpowered engine was impossible. He notes that the XP-86 airframe was capable of transonic flight, but the interim low-power J35-C-3 limited its performance. The late Bob Hoover, chase pilot for Welch and Yeager, had also disputed the Welch story, stating that Welch was not flying that day because his plane was being repaired. The highest Mach number reached by Welch in 1947, as indicated by official flight test records, was about 0.93, in a maximum power dive from 45,114 ft (13,751 m) with the engine at 100.8% Military RPM (i.e. maximum power). North American conducted this test, their "High Mach Number Investigation", on November 13. The USAF verified all North American results and this test Mach number in their own Phase II tests conducted in December 1947.

By the end of 1947, the XP-86 had logged 29 hours and 23 minutes of flight test time, most flown by Welch. On October 14, 1947, Yeager exceeded Mach 1 in the Bell X-1. The claim of the XP-86 passing Mach 1, with Welch at the controls, was not made until April 26, 1948, five and a half months after the X-1 supersonic flight. Blackburn, however, maintains that a record on the Muroc radar theodolite, of the two flights Welch made on November 13, 1947, indicated supersonic flights, as well, noting 20 minutes before the X-1 broke the record, a sonic boom was heard over the desert, centered on the Happy Bottom Riding Club, (Note: The Happy Bottom Riding Club was more formally known as the Rancho Oro Verde Fly-Inn Dude Ranch.) a dude ranch restaurant and hotel operated by Pancho Barnes.

== Later career and death ==
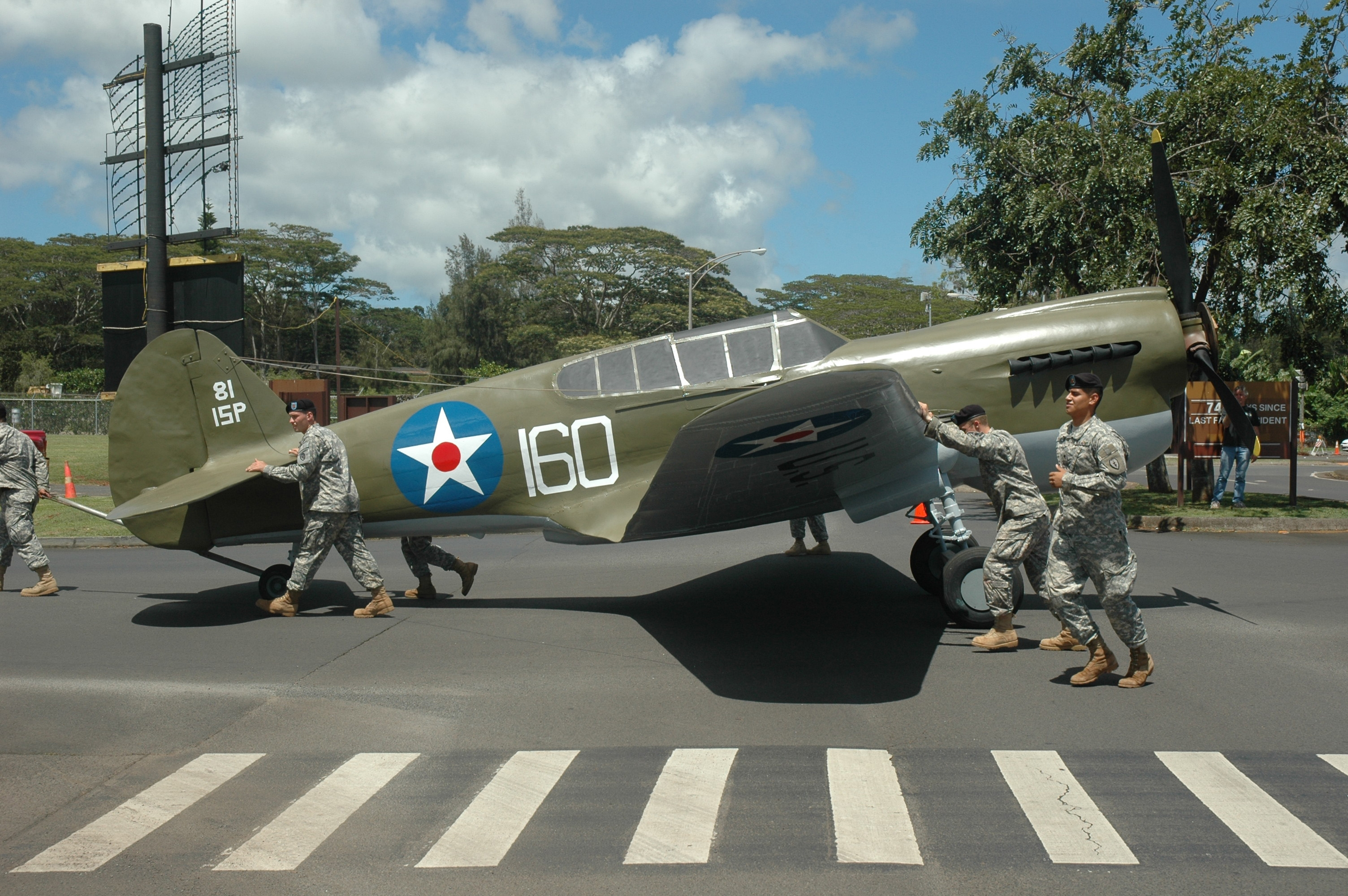
A replica P-40 being moved for display at Wheeler Army Airfield, with markings similar to the one flown by Welch

Welch went on to work as chief test pilot, engineer, and instructor with North American Aviation during the Korean War, where he reportedly downed several enemy MiG-15 Fagots while "supervising" his students. Welch's kills were in disobedience of direct orders for him not to engage, and credits for the kills were thus distributed among his students.

After the war, Welch returned to flight testing; this time in the F-100 Super Sabre, with Yeager flying the chase plane. Welch became the first man to break the sound barrier in level flight with this type of aircraft on May 25, 1953. Stability problems were encountered in the flight test program, and on October 12, 1954, Welch's F-100A-1-NA Super Sabre, AF Ser. No. 52-5764, disintegrated during a 7-G pullout at Mach 1.55 from 45,000 feet (14,000 m) and crashed in Rosamond Lake in the Mojave Desert about 45 miles (72 km) north of Los Angeles. When he was found, Welch was still in the ejection seat, critically injured. He was evacuated by helicopter, but was pronounced dead on arrival at the United States Air Force Plant 42 hospital. He is buried in Arlington National Cemetery.

== Film portrayal ==
In the 1970 film Tora! Tora! Tora!, Welch was portrayed by actor Rick Cooper.

== Awards and decorations ==
His decorations include:

United States Army Air Forces pilot badge
Distinguished Service Cross		Silver Star
Distinguished Flying Cross with two bronze oak leaf clusters	Air Medal with bronze oak leaf cluster	American Defense Service Medal with service star
American Campaign Medal	Asiatic-Pacific Campaign Medal with silver and bronze campaign stars	World War II Victory Medal

Army Presidential Unit Citation
with two bronze oak leaf clusters

=== Distinguished Service Cross citation ===

Welch, George S.
Second Lieutenant, U.S. Army Air Forces
47th Pursuit Squadron, 18th Pursuit Group, Hawaiian Air Force
Date of Action: December 7, 1941

Citation:

The President of the United States of America, authorized by Act of Congress, July 9, 1918, takes pleasure in presenting the Distinguished Service Cross to Second Lieutenant (Air Corps) George Schwartz Welch, United States Army Air Forces, for extraordinary heroism in connection with military operations against an armed enemy while serving as Pilot of a P-40 Fighter Airplane in the 47th Pursuit Squadron, 18th Pursuit Group, Hawaiian Air Force, in action over the Island of Oahu, Territory of Hawaii and waters adjacent thereto, on 7 December 1941. When surprised by a heavy air attack by Japanese forces on Wheeler Field and vicinity at approximately 8 a.m., Lieutenant Welch left Wheeler and proceeded by car, under fire, to Haleiwa Landing Field, approximately ten miles distance, where his squadron's planes were stationed. Immediately, on his own initiative, he took off for the purpose of attacking invading forces, without first obtaining information as to number or type of Japanese in the attacking force, and proceeded to his initial point over Barbers Point. At time of take off he was armed only with thirty-caliber machine guns. Upon arrival over Barbers Point, he observed a formation of approximately twelve planes over Ewa, about 100 feet below and ten miles away. Accompanied by only one other pursuit ship, he immediately attacked this enemy formation, shooting down an enemy dive bomber with one burst from three .30-caliber guns. At this point one .30 gun jammed. While engaged in this combat, his plane was hit by an incendiary bullet which passed through the baggage compartment just in rear of his seat. He climbed above the clouds, checked his plane, returned to the attack over Barbers Point and immediately attacked a Japanese plane running out to sea, which he shot down, the plane falling in the ocean. No more enemy planes in sight, he proceeded to Wheeler to refuel and replenish ammunition. Refueling and reloading completed but before repairing guns, a second wave of about fifteen enemy planes approached low over Wheeler. Three came at him and he immediately took off, headed straight into the attack and went to the assistance of a brother officer being attacked from the rear. This enemy plane burst into flames and crashed halfway between Wahiawa and Haleiwa. During this combat his plane was struck by three bullets from the rear gun of the ship he was attacking, one striking his motor, one the propeller and one the cowling. This attack wave having disappeared he returned to the vicinity of Ewa and found one enemy plane proceeding seaward, which he pursued and shot down about five miles off shore, immediately thereafter returning to his station at Haleiwa Landing Field. Lieutenant Welch's initiative, presence of mind, coolness under fire against overwhelming odds in his first battle, expert maneuvering of his plane, and determined action contributed to a large extent toward driving off this sudden unexpected enemy air attack. Second Lieutenant Welch's unquestionable valor in aerial combat is in keeping with the highest traditions of the military service and reflects great credit upon himself, the Hawaiian Air Force, and the United States Army Air Forces.

== Aerial victory credits ==
Chronicle of aerial victories
Date	#	Type	Location	Aircraft flown	Unit Assigned
December 7, 1941	3; 1	Aichi D3A; Mitsubishi A6M	Oahu, Hawaii	P-40 Warhawk	47 PS, 18 PG
December 7, 1942	2; 1	Aichi D3A; Mitsubishi A6M	Buna, New Guinea	P-39 Airacobra	36 FS, 8 FG
June 21, 1943	2	Mitsubishi A6M	Lae, New Guinea	P-38 Lightning	36 FS, 8 FG
August 20, 1943	2; 1	Kawasaki Ki-61; Mitsubishi A6M	Wewak, New Guinea	P-38 Lightning	36 FS, 8 FG
September 2, 1943	3; 1	Nakajima Ki-43; Mitsubishi Ki-46	Wewak, New Guinea; Madang, New Guinea	P-38 Lightning	36 FS, 8 FG

SOURCES: Air Force Historical Study 85: USAF Credits for the Destruction of Enemy Aircraft, World War II

== See also ==
- Hans Guido Mutke
