= A Private's Affair =

1959 film by Raoul Walsh

- Theatrical release poster
- Directed by: Raoul Walsh
- Screenplay by: Winston Miller
- Story by: Ray Livingston Murphy
- Produced by: David Weisbart
- Starring: Sal Mineo; Christine Carère; Barry Coe; Barbara Eden; Gary Crosby
- Cinematography: Charles G. Clarke
- Edited by: Dorothy Spencer
- Music by: Cyril J. Mockridge
- Production company: 20th Century-Fox
- Distributed by: 20th Century-Fox
- Release date: October 9, 1959
- Running time: 93 minutes
- Country: United States
- Language: English
- Budget: $1.2 million
- Box office: $1.5 million (est. US/ Canada rentals)

A Private's Affair is a 1959 American musical comedy film directed by Raoul Walsh and starring Sal Mineo and Christine Carère. The film was nominated for a Golden Globe in 1960.

== Plot ==
Two men from New York—Luigi, a hip wanna-be beatnik, and Jerry, who's from Long Island—end up in Army basic training in New Jersey, as does Mike, who's a rancher from Oregon.

At a dance, Luigi falls for Marie, a neighbor of Jerry, who in turn develops a romantic interest in Luigi's friend Louise. A WAC named Katie ends up accompanying Mike to the dance. The three G.I.s can sing and end up invited to perform on a New York television program, but Jerry becomes ill and is hospitalized.

Assistant Secretary to the Army Elizabeth Chapman, meanwhile, wants to keep a 6-year-old Dutch girl from being sent back to Holland after the girl's mother dies. Elizabeth decides to marry the girl's gravely injured father so she can assume custody of the child. By mistake, an unconscious Jerry is wheeled in and ends up wed to Elizabeth, who had no idea what the girl's dad looked like.

Chaos ensues, as Jerry is repeatedly arrested or brought to see psychiatrists when he claims to have been accidentally married to one of the top officers in the U.S. Army.

== Cast ==
- Sal Mineo as Luigi J. Maresi
- Christine Carère as Marie
- Barry Coe as Jerry Morgan
- Barbara Eden as Sgt. Katie Mulligan
- Gary Crosby as Mike Conroy
- Terry Moore as Louise Wright
- Jim Backus as Jim Gordon
- Jessie Royce Landis as Elizabeth T. Chapman
- Robert Burton as Gen. Charles E. Hargrave
- Alan Hewitt as Maj. R.C. Hanley
- Bob Denver as MacIntosh
- Tige Andrews as Sgt. Pickerell
- Ray Montgomery as Capt. Hickman
- Rudolph Anders as Dr. Leyden
- Debbie Joyce as Magdalena
- The Volantes as Themselves

== Production ==
The film was originally known as The Love Maniac and was announced in October 1956 as a vehicle for Elvis Presley and Jayne Mansfield. It was retitled A Private Affair in 1959.

The movie was one of a number made by 20th Century Fox at the time aimed at the youth market using contract talent. Others included Holiday for Lovers and Blue Denim.

The film was meant to star Sheree North but she dropped out when she fell pregnant and was replaced by Barbara Eden, then best known for the TV series How to Marry a Millionaire. Filming began 1 April 1959.
