= The Legend of Tom Dooley =

1959 film by Ted Post

- Directed by: Ted Post
- Written by: Stanley Shpetner (as Stan Shpetner)
- Produced by: Stanley Shpetner (as Stan Shpetner)
- Starring: Michael Landon; Jo Morrow; Jack Hogan; Richard Rust; Dee Pollock; Ken Lynch
- Cinematography: Gilbert Warrenton
- Edited by: Robert S. Eisen
- Music by: Ronald Stein
- Color process: Black and white
- Production company: Sheptner Productions
- Distributed by: Columbia Pictures
- Release date: July 1959
- Running time: 79 minutes
- Country: United States
- Language: English

The Legend of Tom Dooley is a 1959 American Western film directed by Ted Post and starring Michael Landon, Jo Morrow, Jack Hogan, Richard Rust, Dee Pollock and Ken Lynch. It was based on the 90-year-old folk song "Tom Dooley", which had been inspired by the real-life case of convicted murderer Tom Dula. The theme song of the film is a ballad, a hit for The Kingston Trio in 1958. The movie's plot is consistent with the lyrics of the song, but otherwise bears little resemblance to the actual murder case.

== Plot ==
At the end of the American Civil War, Confederate soldier Tom Dooley leads an attack on a stagecoach, unaware that the war was already over. Dooley is declared to be a murderer, but he returns to his hometown, hoping to marry his fiancée, Laura Foster.

Trouble soon breaks out, and Laura and he are forced to elope, pursued by lawman Charlie Grayson, who also has romantic interest in Laura. Tom and Laura get married and attempt to escape to Tennessee, but are soon captured by Grayson. Dooley is locked up in the town jail after a quick trial, in which he is sentenced to be hanged in the morning, but escapes with the help of one of his Confederate Army friends, "Country Boy".

Grayson catches Laura as she tries to reunite with Dooley. Grayson tries to force himself on Laura, but is interrupted by the arrival of Dooley and Country Boy. In the ensuing fight, Laura is accidentally stabbed while Dooley and Grayson struggle with a knife, and then Grayson and Country Boy shoot each other. Laura dies in Dooley's arms as the sheriff arrives and recaptures Dooley, who is then led off to his execution.

== Cast ==
- Michael Landon as Tom Dooley
- Jo Morrow as Laura Foster
- Jack Hogan as Charlie Grayson
- Richard Rust as Country Boy
- Dee Pollock as Abel
- Ken Lynch as Father
- Howard Wright as Sheriff Joe Dobbs
- Ralph Moody as Doc Henry
- John Cliff as Lieutenant
- Cheerio Meredith as Meg
- Gary Hunley as The Kid
- Anthony Jochim as Preacher
- Jeff Morris as Confederate Soldier

== See also ==
- List of American films of 1959
