= Dee Pollock =

American film and television actor

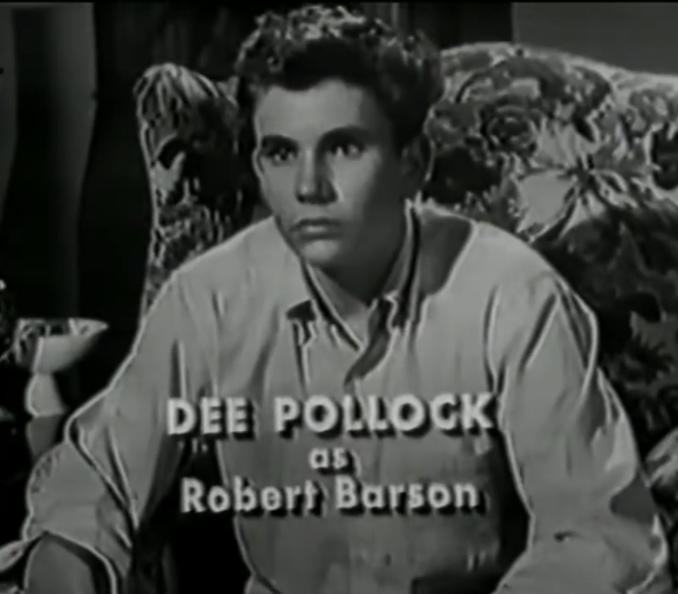
- Pollock in Dragnet, 1958
- Born: Finis Dee Pollock; September 24, 1937; Alhambra, California, U.S.
- Died: December 27, 2005 (aged 68); Chico, California, U.S.
- Occupations: Film and television actor
- Years active: 1951–1985

Finis Dee Pollock (September 24, 1937 – December 27, 2005) was an American film and television actor. He was perhaps best-known for playing Billy Urchin in the American Western television series Gunslinger.

== Life and career ==
Pollock was born in Alhambra, California, the son of Lucia Curtwright and Robert Pollock. He attended Mark Keppel High School. He began his acting career in 1951, appearing in the Western television series The Adventures of Kit Carson. Pollock then appeared in the film The Blue Vail, In 1952, he made appearances in the films The Old West, Beware, My Lovely, Park Row, and It Grows on Trees.

Pollock guest-starred in television programs including Gunsmoke, Bonanza, Wagon Train, 12 O'Clock High, Johnny Ringo, Outlaw, Tales of Wells Fargo, Perry Mason, The Virginian, and The Fugitive. In 1961, he joined the cast of the new CBS Western television series Gunslinger, playing the role of Billy Urchin. Pollock appeared in the films Carousel (as Enoch Snow Jr.), Take a Giant Step, Captain Apache, The Lineup, The Legend of Tom Dooley, The Plunderers, and The Wayward Bus. In 1970, he played the role of Jones in the film Kelly's Heroes. His final film credit was from the 1972 film Embassy.

Pollock retired from acting in the early 1970s. In 1989, he moved to Chico, California, to look after his mother.

== Death ==
Pollock died in December 2005 of a heart attack in Chico, California, at the age of 68.

== Television ==
Year	Title	Role	Notes
1961	Rawhide	Inger Jeffries	S3:E28, "Incident of the Blackstorms"
1964	The Outer Limits	PFC Francis Hadley	S2:E10 and S2:E11, "The Inheritors pt. 1" and "The Inheritors pt. 2"
1966	Gunsmoke	Tom Carlyle	S11:E18, "The Raid"
