= He Rides Tall =

1964 film by R. G. Springsteen

- Theatrical release poster
- Directed by: R. G. Springsteen
- Screenplay by: Charles Irwin; Robert Creighton Williams
- Story by: Charles Irwin
- Produced by: Gordon Kay
- Starring: Tony Young; Dan Duryea; Jo Morrow; Madlyn Rhue; R. G. Armstrong; Joel Fluellen
- Cinematography: Ellis W. Carter
- Edited by: Russell F. Schoengarth
- Music by: Irving Gertz
- Production company: Universal Pictures
- Distributed by: Universal Pictures
- Release date: February 26, 1964
- Running time: 84 minutes
- Country: United States
- Language: English

He Rides Tall is a 1964 American Western film directed by R. G. Springsteen and written by Charles Irwin and Robert Creighton Williams. The film stars Tony Young, Dan Duryea, Jo Morrow, Madlyn Rhue, R. G. Armstrong, and Joel Fluellen. The film was released on February 26, 1964, by Universal Pictures.

== Plot ==
It is the last day on the job for Marshal Morg Rocklin who plans to get married. The new marshal is due in town the next day. Unfortunately, a bunch of troublemakers are in town. Among them is rancher Joshua McCloud's no-good son who is bringing in a herd of cattle for sale. Immature, spoiled and quick tempered, the McCloud boy gets into an argument with his cowhands in the saloon and shoots one dead. The marshal tries to arrest McCloud's son who draws on the lawman and gets killed. Postponing his wedding, the marshal rides out to break the sad news to old rancher McCloud who has recently taken a young gold-digger wife. The old man drinks too much lately. The marshal fears the worst for his meeting with the old rancher. To make matters worse, Bart Thorne, the McClouds' head ranch boss hates the marshal and wants him dead.

== Cast ==
- Tony Young as Marshal Morg Rocklin
- Dan Duryea as Bart Thorne
- Jo Morrow as Katie McCloud
- Madlyn Rhue as Ellie Daniels
- R. G. Armstrong as Joshua "Josh" McCloud
- Joel Fluellen as Dr. Sam
- Carl Reindel as Gil McCloud
- Mickey Simpson as Onie
- George Murdock as Burt
- Michael Carr as Lefty
- George O. Petrie as Crowley
- Myron Healey as Marshall Ed Loomis(uncredited)
