= The Flame Barrier =

1958 film by Paul Landres

- Theatrical release poster
- Directed by: Paul Landres
- Screenplay by: Pat Fielder; George Worthing Yates
- Story by: George Worthing Yates
- Produced by: Arthur Gardner; Jules Levy
- Starring: Arthur Franz; Kathleen Crowley; Robert Brown; Vicente Padula; Rodd Redwing
- Cinematography: Jack MacKenzie
- Edited by: Jerry Young
- Music by: Gerald Fried
- Production company: Gramercy Pictures
- Distributed by: United Artists
- Release date: April 2, 1958
- Running time: 70 minutes
- Country: United States
- Language: English

The Flame Barrier is a 1958 American jungle adventure/science fiction film produced by Arthur Gardner and Jules V. Levy, directed by Paul Landres, and written by Pat Fielder and George Worthing Yates. The film stars Arthur Franz, Kathleen Crowley and Robert Brown. It was released in the U.S. on April 2, 1958 by United Artists as the bottom half of a double feature with The Return of Dracula (1958).

== Plot ==
American satellite X-117, carrying a chimpanzee, has unexpectedly fallen back to Earth after entering a non-existent/fictional part of the stratosphere known as "the flame barrier", which encircles Earth at an altitude of 200 miles. Howard Dahlman (Dan Gachman), a rich businessman and ardent amateur space program enthusiast, went into the Mexican jungle to recover the satellite, but never returned. His wife, Carol (Kathleen Crowley), sets out to find him.

Arriving in Campeche, Mexico, Carol meets two jungle guides, the ill-tempered Dave Hollister (Arthur Franz) and his drunken but good-hearted brother, Matt (Robert Brown). When she asks their help, Dave refuses, citing the coming rainy season. But he changes his mind after Carol gives in to his extravagant demand for $7,000 each for him and Matt if Howard is alive or 10 percent of his estate if he is dead. Dave asks Carol which is more important to her, Howard or the money from his estate. She hesitates before saying unconvincingly that she wants to find her husband alive.

Carol, Dave, Matt and their native porters head into the jungle with a copy of Howard's map. It shows the route he took to the X-117 crash site, 200 miles from Campeche.

In the jungle, they find a burned skeleton. Dave examines it and tells Carol that it is not Howard. Dave asks if she loves Howard. Carol says that she does not know and that perhaps this is what she is trying to learn on the expedition. In return, Dave says that he too had had an unhappy marriage.

At their camp, Dave, Matt and the porters bring in a badly burned tribesman. Dave attempts to treat him, but the man dies. The porters say that the God of Fire is responsible. To everyone's shock, the man's body suddenly bursts into flames, leaving a skeleton similar to the one they had found earlier.

Despite the rigors of the trek, Carol and Dave's mutual attraction grows. They kiss passionately later that night.

One by one the porters run off, leaving Carol, Dave and Matt on their own. They soon find Howard's abandoned camp. It has solar power and, surprisingly, the chimp from the satellite is there. Carol says that she is now convinced that Howard is dead, but Dave says that they must find Howard's body to legally prove it. A tribesman appears and takes them to the cave where he says the God of Fire lives.

Inside the cave, they find X-117 surrounded by an alien blob, out of which Howard's perfectly preserved head protrudes. But the chimp disintegrates as it approaches the blob, which itself is surrounded by a deadly invisible electric field. Dave and Matt calculate that the blob doubles in size every two hours. At that rate, it will expand out of the cave and overtake them if they try to outrun it. Their only chance is to destroy it inside the cave.

Dave notices that X-117 is sitting on two veins of metallic ore. He says that if they connect a solar battery to both veins, they can perhaps electrocute the blob and kill it. But by the time they have prepared everything, they have only eight minutes before the blob again doubles in size. Matt climbs to the vein above the blob. Unfortunately, they have miscalculated and the blob suddenly begins to expand. Matt dives into the blob, sacrificing himself, but giving Dave just enough time to electrocute it.

With the blob dead, Carol and Dave walk slowly away, arm in arm.

== Cast ==
Credited:

- Arthur Franz as Dave Hollister
- Kathleen Crowley as Carol Dahlman
- Robert Brown as Matt Hollister
- Rodd Redwing as Chief Waumi
- Kaz Oran as Tispe
- Larry Duran as Bearer
- Vincent Padula as Julio
- Dan Gachman as Howard Dahlman

Uncredited:

- Grace Matthews as Girl at Bar
- Pilar Del Rey as Girl at Truck
- Bernie Grozier as Burned Indian
- Roberto Contreras as Village Indian

== Production ==
Sources indicate that the film was made quickly. American film historian Bill Warren noted that "the script was written and filmed in a great hurry - it was shot in late December 1957, and ready for release by early April 1958". The movie was shot on a sound stage in "six or seven days", on a budget of approximately $100,000. The film is black and white and is in a 1.37:1 aspect ratio.

The origins of The Flame Barrier are somewhat vague. Daily Variety reportedly carried an item sometime in July 1957 which stated that Gramercy Pictures purchased an original story titled "The Flame Barrier" from author Sam X. Abarbanel and hired Yates and Fielder to adapt it into a screenplay. Both Yates and Fielder are credited on screen. Abarbabel is not, and his role in writing the screenplay, if he had one, is unknown. The film's original working title was Beyond the Flame Barrier.

== Distribution ==
The Flame Barrier was released on April 2, 1958 in the U.S., in September 1958 in the UK, and on May 12, 1962 in Mexico. It was also released, at unspecified dates, in France, Italy, Greece and Brazil. Upon its release in the UK, it was granted a U certificate by the British Board of Film Censors, where the "U" stood for "Universal" and allowed "anyone to watch it, with no restrictions whatsoever".

The Flame Barrier was distributed to American theaters by United Artists as the bottom half of a double feature with The Return of Dracula. The press book for the films called them "The Screen's Greatest Twin-Horror Show!"

== Reception ==
The somewhat unusual mixing of jungle adventure and science fiction film elements has been noted by both the people involved in producing the movie and those who have commented on it. Fielder told American film scholar Tom Weaver in an interview, "I think we were kind of following a pattern of other jungle movies of the time - but there had been the event of a Sputnik going up with a monkey on board". Gardner said in the same interview, "We were disappointed in The Flame Barrier", because "without a good screenplay, you just can't make a good film". He also noted that The Flame Barrier - like the other Gramercy Pictures horror/sci-fi films The Monster That Challenged the World, The Vampire and The Return of Dracula - was "not very profitable."

Contemporary reviews, however, were not unusually bad. BoxOffice rated the film as "good", while Harrison's Reports, Film Daily and Parents all called it "fair". BoxOffice called The Flame Barrier "wild and wooly" with "sufficient excitement" to "satisfy the most action-minded fan", but also referred to its "opening scenes" as "rather routine". Saying that the film "builds up suspense steadily", the magazine predicted that "teenagers will overlook the fact that this is routine entertainment and go for it in a big way" while "adult males will accept it" as the second half of a double feature.

Retrospective reviews tended to be more negative, although critic R.G. Young called The Flame Barrier a "modest but thought-provoking SF thriller". British film historian Phil Hardy wrote, "After the successful launch of a satellite by the Soviet Union in 1957, there was considerable public agitation about trespassing into the unknown" and said that the film exploited such fears. Hardy also noted that the "protoplasm" on the satellite "has the look of a sub-standard, low-budget special effects' department".

Bill Warren was not impressed by The Flame Barrier. Like Hardy, he pointed out that "it was designed to capitalize on interest in satellites" and said that the alien protoplasm "looks more like crumpled cellophane than jelly". Returning to the jungle adventure theme, Warren said, "This minor little picture consists of soundstage jungle thrills; the science fiction elements don't come in until the last few minutes". He went on to call the film "singularly dull" and pointed out that "there is no flame barrier in reality, and it has no real application to the movie". The film's title "may have varied in different parts" of the U.S., said Warren, citing Beyond the Flame Barrier and It Fell from the Flame Barrier as possible alternatives.
