= Orienta =

Orienta may refer to:

== Places ==
- Orienta, Wisconsin
- Orienta, Oklahoma

== Things ==
- Orienta (album), 1959 exotica album by The Markko Polo Adventurers
- Orienta (ship), yacht owned by Edward R. Ladew
- Orienta (moth), subgenus in the family Oecophoridae
