= Steven Poster =

American cinematographer (b. 1944)

- Born: Steven Barry Poster; 1 March 1944 (age 82); Chicago, Illinois, U.S.
- Education: Southern Illinois University; ArtCenter College of Design; Illinois Institute of Technology
- Years active: 1967–2024
- Title: President of the International Cinematographers Guild (2006-2019)
- Website: www.edgeofconsciousness.com

Steven Barry Poster ASC, CSC (born 1 March 1944) is an American cinematographer. He served as the president of the International Cinematographers Guild from 2006 to 2019.

== Early life and education ==
Born and raised in Chicago, Illinois, Poster studied at Southern Illinois University, the ArtCenter College of Design, and the Illinois Institute of Technology.

== Career ==
Poster began his filmmaking career as a creative assistant at 'The Film Group,' a Chicago-based commercial film production company. After being promoted to director of photography for his skill at lighting, he met Herschell Gordon Lewis and worked with him in various crew positions on a total of three films.

He founded a production company with director Michael Mann, and served as the cinematographer on numerous industrial and education films. His 1973 short film Another Saturday Night, which he co-directed with Mik Derks, was nominated for the Short Film Palme d'Or at the Cannes Film Festival 2024. In 1977, he was the second unit cinematographer for Steven Spielberg's Close Encounters of the Third Kind.

In 1980, he relocated to Hollywood and shot his first feature film as cinematographer, Blood Beach. He also worked second unit or additional photography for Blade Runner, The Best Little Whorehouse in Texas, and several John Carpenter films.

Poster joined the American Society of Cinematographers in 1987. The same year, he shot Someone to Watch Over Me for director Ridley Scott, which earned him an ASC Award for Outstanding Achievement in Cinematography in Theatrical Releases

He shot the iconic music video to Madonna's "Like a Prayer", as well as commercials directed by Ridley Scott and Kinka Usher.

In 2006, he was elected as the National President of the International Cinematographers Guild, a position he held until 2019. He is also a former executive board member of the International Documentary Association, and currently sits on the Nicholl Fellowship committee of the Academy of Motion Picture Arts and Sciences. He is also an adjunct professor at the ArtCenter College of Design.

== Filmography ==
=== Feature film ===
Year	Title	Director	Notes
1980	Blood Beach	Jeffrey Bloom	
1981	Dead & Buried	Gary Sherman	
1983	Spring Break	Sean S. Cunningham	
1983	Strange Brew	Rick Moranis; Dave Thomas	
1983	Testament	Lynne Littman	
1985	The New Kids	Sean S. Cunningham	
1985	The Heavenly Kid	Cary Medoway	
1986	Blue City	Michelle Manning	
1986	The Boy Who Could Fly	Nick Castle	With Adam Holender
1987	Someone to Watch Over Me	Ridley Scott	
1988	Aloha Summer	Tommy Lee Wallace	
1988	Big Top Pee-wee	Randal Kleiser	
1989	Next of Kin	John Irvin	
1990	Rocky V	John G. Avildsen	
1990	Opportunity Knocks	Donald Petrie	
1991	Life Stinks	Mel Brooks	
1993	The Cemetery Club	Bill Duke	
1997	RocketMan	Stuart Gillard	
1998	Une chance sur deux	Patrice Leconte	
2001	Donnie Darko	Richard Kelly	
2002	Stuart Little 2	Rob Minkoff	
2003	Daddy Day Care	Steve Carr	
2006	Southland Tales	Richard Kelly	
2009	Spread	David Mackenzie	
2009	The Box	Richard Kelly	
2010	Cats & Dogs: The Revenge of Kitty Galore	Brad Peyton	
2011	Flypaper	Rob Minkoff	
2017	Amityville: The Awakening	Franck Khalfoun	
2024	Scared to Death	Paul Boyd	Also executive producer

Ref.:

=== Television ===
Year	Title	Director	Notes
1978	What Really Happened to the Class of '65?	James Sheldon	Episode "Mr. Potential"
1987	I'll Take Manhattan	Richard Michaels; Douglas Hickox	2 episodes (With Larry Pizer)
1998	American Experience	Richard P. Rogers	Episode "A Midwife's Tale"
2006	The Loop	Betty Thomas	Episode "Pilot"
2007-12	Craft in America	Carol Sauvion; Daniel Seeger; Nigel Noble; Hilary Birmingham	8 episodes
2008	Raising the Bar	Jesse Bochco	Episode "Pilot"
2013	Hemlock Grove	Eli Roth	Episode "Jellyfish in the Sky"
2020	Cine Chalom	Yossi Benavraham	Episode "EXTRAIT DU FILM "INCASSABLE" DE M. NIGHT SHYAMALAN... 2000"

TV movies

Year	Title	Director
1978	The Grass Is Always Greener Over the Septic Tank	Robert Day
1979	The Night Rider	Hy Averback
1979	Beggarman, Thief	Lawrence Doheny
1981	Coward of the County	Dick Lowry
1982	Mysterious Two	Gary Sherman
1983	The Cradle Will Fall	John Llewellyn Moxey
1986	Courage	Jeremy Kagan
1992	The Bat, the Cat and the Penguin	Michael Meadows; John Pattyson
1994	Roswell	Jeremy Kagan
1995	Present Tense, Past Perfect	Richard Dreyfuss
1996	Once You Meet a Stranger	Tommy Lee Wallace
1997	Color of Justice	Jeremy Kagan
2005	Mrs. Harris	Phyllis Nagy
2006	The Danny Comden Project	Robert Duncan McNeill
2013	Gutsy Frog	Mark A.Z. Dippé

== Accolades ==
Year	Institution	Category	Title	Result
1973	Cannes Film Festival	Short Film Palme d'Or	Another Saturday Night (Shared with Mik Derks)	Nominated
1987	American Society of Cinematographers	Outstanding Achievement in Cinematography	Someone to Watch Over Me	Nominated
1994	CableACE Award	Direction of Photography and/or Lighting Direction	Roswell	Nominated
2005	Primetime Emmy Awards	Outstanding Cinematography	Mrs. Harris	Nominated
