= Broidy =

Broidy is a surname. Notable people with the surname include:

- Elliott Broidy, American venture capitalist
- Steve Broidy (1905–1991), American film executive and producer
- William F. Broidy (1915–1959), American film and television producer
