= The Plunderers (1960 film) =

1960 film by Joseph Pevney

- Theatrical release poster
- Directed by: Joseph Pevney
- Written by: Bob Barbash
- Produced by: Joseph Prevney
- Starring: Jeff Chandler; John Saxon; Dolores Hart
- Narrated by: Jeff Chandler
- Cinematography: Gene Polito
- Edited by: Tom McAdoo
- Music by: Leonard Rosenman
- Production company: August Productions
- Distributed by: Allied Artists
- Release date: November 5, 1960
- Running time: 94 minutes
- Country: United States
- Language: English

The Plunderers is a 1960 American Western film directed by Joseph Pevney and starring Jeff Chandler, John Saxon and Dolores Hart. It was nominated for a Golden Globe in 1960.

== Plot ==
Unruly cowboys Rondo, Jeb, Mule and Davy ride into the small town of Trail City. They are unable to pay for their drinks, so Sheriff McCauley jails them for a night, on the understanding that they will leave town in the morning. The next day, however, they refuse to pay Ellie Walters at the general store for the clothes they take, and then convince Kate Miller that they will pay for the rooms they take at her hotel.

Realizing that they are trouble-makers, Kate asks the rancher Sam Christy, an old love of hers, for help. He is an American Civil War hero, but has lost the use of one arm and is tired of fighting. She accuses him of cowardice, and they part acrimoniously. Ellie warns Kate that she will lose her chance of marrying Sam. When the cowboys beat up the saloon keeper and McCauley is killed by Jeb, however, Sam offers to do what he can. The four cowboys go through the town and gather up everyone's guns, leaving the townsfolk defenseless. They ply the town drunk, Abilene, with whiskey in exchange for information.

Sam goes to his ranch to get his gun, but is ambushed by two of the cowboys and beaten. Ellie finds him at the ranch and tends to him and they kiss. They drive back to town, where Sam gathers the men in the stable to hatch a plan. They decide to separate the cowboys and capture them one by one. Davy is upset by what is going on and wants the cowboys to leave. He decides to go on his own, but when he goes to the stable to get his horse, he is captured by Sam and the townspeople. Ellie is attacked by Rondo but she fights him off and he is captured by Sam using Davy's gun. In the stable, Rondo comes at Sam with a knife and Ellie shoots him. Sam then kills Mule in a knife fight and shoots the panicking Jeb. He allows the remorseful Davy to leave town. Ellie and Sam come together.

== Cast ==
- Jeff Chandler as Sam Christy
- John Saxon as Rondo
- Dolores Hart as Ellie Walters
- Marsha Hunt as Kate Miller – Hotel Owner
- Jay C. Flippen as Sheriff McCauley
- Ray Stricklyn as Jeb Lucas Tyler
- James Westerfield as Mike Baron – Saloon Owner
- Dee Pollock as Davy
- Roger Torrey as William 'Mule' Thompson
- Vaughn Taylor as Jess Walters – General Store Owner
- Harvey Stephens as Doc Fuller
- Joseph Hamilton as Abilene – Barfly
- Kenneth Patterson as 2nd Citizen (as Ken Patterson)
- William Challee as 1st Citizen
- Ray Ferrell as Billy Miller

== Production ==
The film was made by August Productions for Allied Artists. August was a production company established by Jeff Chandler in association with writer Bob Barbash and publicist Jess Rand. Chandler described the film as "not a Western though the locale is the West." John Saxon had played many Mexican parts.

Filming started 12 May 1960.

== Release ==
Steve Broidy of Allied Artists was so happy with the film he requested three more movies from August, only two of which Chandler had to appear in.

Filmink called the film "a mash up between a Western and juvenile delinquent film...occasionally effective but is poorly paced and staged."
