= Gerald Fried =

American composer, conductor, and oboist (1928–2023)

- Born: February 13, 1928; New York City, New York, U.S.
- Died: February 17, 2023 (aged 95) Bridgeport, Connecticut, U.S.
- Genres: Film score, contemporary classical
- Occupations: Composer; conductor; musician
- Instrument: Oboe
- Years active: 1951–2023

Gerald Fried (February 13, 1928 – February 17, 2023) was an American composer, conductor, and oboist known for his film and television scores. He composed music for well-known television series of the 1960s and 1970s, including Mission: Impossible, Gilligan's Island, The Man from U.N.C.L.E., Shotgun Slade, Roots, and Star Trek. Early in his career, he collaborated with Stanley Kubrick, scoring several of his earliest films.

Fried was nominated for five Primetime Emmy Awards, winning once in 1977 for Roots, and was nominated for an Academy Award for Best Original Score for the documentary Birds Do It, Bees Do It (1974).

== Life and career ==
Born and raised in The Bronx, New York City, Fried attended The Juilliard School of Music. He attended High School of Music & Art, graduating in 1945, and entered the world of film soundtracks when he composed the scores for five of Stanley Kubrick's earliest films.

After moving to Los Angeles he began composing and arranging music for several films such as Terror in a Texas Town and television shows such as The Man from U.N.C.L.E., working with Robert Drasnin, and also the original Star Trek, for which he composed the famous musical underscore "The Ritual/Ancient Battle/2nd Kroykah" (now known as "Star Trek fight music") for the episode "Amok Time." Among his television show themes is his jazz-inspired intro for the western series Shotgun Slade.

Fried was known for his collaboration with Quincy Jones on their Emmy Award-winning score for the 1977 miniseries Roots. Fried also arranged the exotica album Orienta. He won Golden Pine Award (Lifetime Achievement) at the 2013 International Samobor Film Music Festival, along with Ryuichi Sakamoto and Clint Eastwood. His credits consist of nearly 300 films, television episodes, and specials.

== Personal life and death ==
In December 1987, Fried lost his 5-year-old son, Zachary, due to AIDS from tainted blood supplied by a blood bank. His screenplay and stage play Morningtime Train was based on the experience. Zachary's childhood drawings were used on T-shirts in fundraisers for The Pediatric AIDS Foundation. Fried had four other children, with his first wife Judith Fried: Daniel, Deborah, Jonathan, and Joshua were all born in the 1950s.

Fried died of pneumonia in Bridgeport, Connecticut, on February 17, 2023, four days after his 95th birthday.

== Filmography ==
- Day of the Fight (1951) — (Short Documentary) — Director: Stanley Kubrick
- Fear and Desire (1953) — Director: Stanley Kubrick
- Lili (1953) — Director: Charles Walters (Composer: Additional Music — Uncredited)
- Killer's Kiss (1955) — Director: Stanley Kubrick
- The Killing (1956) — Director: Stanley Kubrick
- Paths of Glory (1957) — Director: Stanley Kubrick
- The Vampire (1957) — Director: Paul Landres
- Bayou (1957) — Director: Harold Daniels
- Trooper Hook (1957) — Director: Charles Marquis Warren
- Dino (1957) — Director: Thomas Carr
- I Bury the Living (1958) — Director: Albert Band
- The Return of Dracula (1958) — Director: Paul Landres
- The Flame Barrier (1958) — Director: Paul Landres
- Machine-Gun Kelly (1958) — Director: Roger Corman
- The Lost Missile (1958) — Director: Lester Wm. Berke
- I Mobster (1958) — Director: Roger Corman
- The Cry Baby Killer (1958) — Director: Jus Addiss
- Terror in a Texas Town (1958) — Director: Joseph H. Lewis
- Curse of the Faceless Man (1958) — Director: Edward L. Cahn
- M Squad (TV series, 3 episodes)
  - Dead or Alive (1958)
  - The Big Kill (1958)
  - Prescription for Murder (1958)
- High School Big Shot (1959) — Director: Joel Rapp
- Schlitz Playhouse of Stars (TV series, 1 episode)
  - The Salted Mine (1959)
- Timbuktu (1959) — Director: Jacques Tourneur
- Wagon Train (TV series, 1 episode)
  - The Steve Campden Story (1959)
- Cast a Long Shadow (1959) — Director: Thomas Carr
- Shotgun Slade (TV series, 17 episodes)
  - The Missing Train (1959)
  - The Salted Mine (1959)
  - The Deadly Key (1960)
  - Donna Juanita (1960)
  - The Golden Tunnel (1960)
  - A Flower for Jenny (1960)
  - The Fabulous Fiddle (1960)
  - Crossed Guns (1960)
  - Sudden Death (1960)
  - Backtrack (1960)
  - Killer's Brand (1960)
  - A Flower on Boot Hill (1960)
  - Charcoal Bullet (1960)
  - Lost Gold (1960)
  - Ring of Death (1960)
  - The Smell of Money (1960)
  - The Spanish Box (1960)
- Riverboat (TV series, 15 episodes)
  - The Blowup (1960)
  - The Wichita Arrows (1960)
  - Fort Epitaph (1960)
  - End of a Dream (1960)
  - That Taylor Affair (1960)
  - The Two Faces of Grey Holden (1960)
  - River Champion (1960)
  - No Bridge on the River (1960)
  - Trunk Full of Dreams (1960)
  - The Water of Gorgeous Springs (1960)
  - Devil in Skirts (1960)
  - The Quota (1960)
  - Chicota Landing (1960)
  - Zigzag (1960)
  - Listen to the Nightingale (1961)
- A Cold Wind in August (1961) — Director: Alexander Singer
- Twenty Plus Two (1961) — Director: Joseph M. Newman
- The Second Time Around (1961) — Director: Vincent Sherman
- Whispering Smith (TV series, 3 episodes)
  - Stake-Out (1961)
  - Three for One (1961)
  - The Interpreter (1961)
- The Cabinet of Caligari (1962) — Director: Roger Kay
- The Great Rights (1963) (short) — Director: William T. Hurtz
- Breaking Point (TV series, 1 episode)
  - Fire and Ice (1963)
- Specials for United Artists: December 7th — The Day of Infamy (1963) (TV movie documentary) — Director: Marshall Flaum
- Specials for United Artists: The Yanks Are Coming (1963) (TV movie documentary) — Director: Marshall Flaum
- Specials for United Artists: Ten Seconds That Shook the World (1963) (TV movie documentary) — Director: Marshall Flaum
- Specials for United Artists: The American Woman in the 20th Century (1963) (TV movie documentary) — Director: Marshall Flaum
- Story of a Rodeo Cowboy (1963) (documentary) — Director: Kent MacKenzie
- Specials for United Artists: The Rise and Fall of American Communism (1964) (TV movie documentary) — Director: Marshall Flaum
- Specials for United Artists: Berlin — Kaiser to Khrushchev (1964) (TV movie documentary) — Director: Marshall Flaum
- One Potato, Two Potato (1964) — Director: Larry Peerce
- My Three Sons (TV series, 1 episode)
  - A Serious Girl (1964)
- Specials for United Artists: The Battle of Britain (1964) (TV movie documentary) — Director: Marshall Flaum
- Specials for United Artists: Trial at Nuremberg (1964) (TV movie documentary) — Director: Marshall Flaum
- Gunsmoke (TV series, 1 episode)
  - Dry Road to Nowhere (1965)
- Gilligan's Island (TV series, 39 episodes)
  - So Sorry, My Island Now (1965)
  - X Marks the Spot (1965)
  - Gilligan Meets Jungle Boy (1965)
  - How to Be a Hero (1965)
  - Forget Me Not (1965)
  - Diogenes, Won't You Please Go Home? (1965)
  - Physical Fatness (1965)
  - It's Magic (1965)
  - A Nose by Any Other Name (1965)
  - Gilligan's Mother-in-Law (1965)
  - Beauty Is as Beauty Does (1965)
  - The Little Dictator (1965)
  - Feed the Kitty (1966)
  - Operation: Steam Heat (1966)
  - Will the Real Mr. Howell Please Stand Up? (1966)
  - Ghost-a-Go-Go (1966)
  - Allergy Time (1966)
  - V for Vitamins (1966)
  - Mr. and Mrs. ??? (1966)
  - Meet the Meteor (1966)
  - Up at Bat (1966)
  - Gilligan vs. Gilligan (1966)
  - Pass the Vegetables, Please (1966)
  - Voodoo (1966)
  - Where There's a Will (1966)
  - Hair Today, Gone Tomorrow (1966)
  - Ring Around Gilligan (1966)
  - Topsy-Turvy (1966)
  - The Invasion (1966)
  - The Kidnapper (1966)
  - And Then There Were None (1966)
  - All About Eva (1966)
  - Gilligan Goes Gung-Ho (1966)
  - Take a Dare (1967)
  - The Second Ginger Grant (1967)
  - The Secret of Gilligan's Island (1967)
  - The Pigeon (1967)
  - Bang! Bang! Bang! (1967)
  - Gilligan, the Goddess (1967)
- The Man from U.N.C.L.E. (TV series, 45 episodes)
  - Alexander the Greater Affair: Part One (1965)
  - Alexander the Greater Affair: Part Two (1965)
  - The Discotheque Affair (1965)
  - The Arabian Affair (1965)
  - The Deadly Toys Affair (1965)
  - The Cherry Blossom Affair (1965)
  - The Children's Day Affair (1965)
  - The Adriatic Express Affair (1965)
  - The Yukon Affair (1965)
  - The Very Important Zombie Affair (1965)
  - The Deadly Goddess Affair (1966)
  - The Bridge of Lions Affair: Part 1 (1966)
  - The Bridge of Lions Affair: Part II (1966)
  - The Foreign Legion Affair (1966)
  - The Moonglow Affair (1966)
  - The Project Deephole Affair (1966)
  - The Bat Cave Affair (1966)
  - The Indian Affairs Affair (1966)
  - The Her Master's Voice Affair (1966)
  - The Sort of Do-It-Yourself Dreadful Affair (1966)
  - The Super-Colossal Affair (1966)
  - The Monks of St. Thomas Affair (1966)
  - The Thor Affair (1966)
  - The Candidate's Wife Affair (1966)
  - The Off-Broadway Affair (1966)
  - The Come with Me to the Casbah Affair (1966)
  - The Abominable Snowman Affair (1966)
  - The My Friend the Gorilla Affair (1966)
  - The Jingle Bells Affair (1966)
  - The Take Me to Your Leader Affair (1966)
  - The Suburbia Affair (1967)
  - The Deadly Smorgasbord Affair (1967)
  - The Yo-Ho-Ho and a Bottle of Rum Affair (1967)
  - The Napoleon's Tomb Affair (1967)
  - The It's All Greek to Me Affair (1967)
  - The Hula Doll Affair (1967)
  - The Pieces of Fate Affair (1967)
  - The Matterhorn Affair (1967)
  - The Hot Number Affair (1967)
  - The When in Roma Affair (1967)
  - The Apple a Day Affair (1967)
  - The Five Daughters Affair: Part I (1967)
  - The Five Daughters Affair: Part II (1967)
  - The Cap and Gown Affair (1967)
  - The Test Tube Killer Affair (1967)
- Deathwatch (1966) — Director: Vic Morrow (Featuring: Leonard Nimoy)
- One Spy Too Many (1966) — Director: Joseph Sargent
- One of Our Spies Is Missing (1966) — Director: E. Darrell Hallenbeck
- The Felony Squad (TV series, 1 episode)
  - The Death of a Dream (1966)
- Jericho (TV series, 1 episode)
  - Eric the Redhead (1966)
- The Man Who Never Was (TV series, 14 episodes)
  - All That Lia Ever Wanted (1966)
  - Escape (1966)
  - Death in Vienna (1966)
  - A Little Ignorance (1966)
  - Target: Eva (1966)
  - Big Fish (1966)
  - Pay Now, Pray Later (1966)
  - Game of Death (1966)
  - If This Be Treason (1966)
  - To Kill an Albatross (1966)
  - Things Dead and Done (1966)
  - The Perfect Crime (1966)
  - In Memory of Davos (1966)
  - Drop by Drop (1966)
- It's About Time (TV series, 22 episodes)
  - And Then I Wrote Happy Birthday to You (1966)
  - The Copper Caper (1966)
  - The Initiation (1966)
  - Tailor Made Hero (1966)
  - The Rainmakers (1966)
  - He Caveman — You Woman (1966)
  - The Champ (1966)
  - Mark Your Ballots (1966)
  - Have I Got a Girl for You (1966)
  - Cave Movies (1966)
  - Androcles and Clon (1966)
  - Love Me, Love My Gnook (1966)
  - The Broken Idol (1966)
  - The Sacrifice (1966)
  - King Hec (1966)
  - The Mother-in-Law (1966)
  - Which Doctor's Witch? (1967)
  - To Catch a Thief (1967)
  - 20th Century Here We Come (1967)
  - To Sign or Not to Sign (1967)
  - Our Brothers' Keepers (1967)
  - The Stowaway (1967)
- T.H.E. Cat (TV series, 3 episodes)
  - To Bell T.H.E. Cat (1966)
  - A Hot Place to Die (1967)
  - A Slight Family Trait (1967)
- Star Trek (TV series, 5 episodes)
  - Shore Leave (1966)
  - Amok Time (1967)
  - Catspaw (1967)
  - Friday's Child (1967)
  - The Paradise Syndrome (1968)
- Mission: Impossible (TV series, 6 episodes)
  - Odds on Evil (1966)
  - The Widow (1967)
  - Trek (1967)
  - Operation "Heart" (1967)
  - The Diplomat (1968)
  - The Code (1969)
- Mr. Terrific (TV series, 3 episodes)
  - Matchless (1967)
  - Stanley the Safecracker (1967)
  - Harley and the Killer (1967)
- The Karate Killers (1967) — Director: Barry Shear
- Dundee and the Culhane (TV series, 1 episode)
  - The Murderer Stallion Brief (1967)
- Iron Horse (TV series, 4 episodes)
  - T Is for Traitor (1967)
  - Six Hours to Sky High (1967)
  - The Return of Hode Avery (1967)
  - Five Days to Washtiba (1967)
- National Geographic (TV series documentary, 1 episode)
  - Winged World (1967)
- Lost in Space (TV series, 2 episodes)
  - Collision of the Planets (1967)
  - Castles in Space (1967)
- Family Affair (TV series, 2 episodes)
  - The Mother Tongue (1967)
  - Christmas Came a Little Early (1968)
- Danger Has Two Faces (1968) (TV movie) — Director: John Newland
- The Killing of Sister George (1968) — Director: Robert Aldrich
- California (1968) (TV movie documentary) — Director: Donald Wrye
- What Ever Happened to Aunt Alice? (1969) — Director: Lee H. Katzin
- Mannix (TV series, 1 episode)
  - A Sleep in the Deep (1969)
- Image of the City (1969) (short) — Director: Charles and Ray Eames
- Too Late the Hero (1970) — Director: Robert Aldrich
- The Enchanted Years (1971) (documentary) — Director: Nicolas Noxon
- The Grissom Gang (1971) — Director: Robert Aldrich
- The Sixth Sense (TV series, 1 episode)
  - Once Upon a Chilling (1972)
- The Baby (1973) — Director: Ted Post
- Birds Do It, Bees Do It (1974) (documentary) — Director: Nicolas Noxon
- I Will Fight No More Forever (1975) (TV movie) — Director: Richard T. Heffron
- Police Story (TV series, 1 episode)
  - Losing Game (1975)
- Police Woman (TV series, 2 episodes)
  - Pattern for Evil (1975)
  - Cold Wind (1975)
- Survive! (1976) — Director: René Cardona Jr.
- Vigilante Force (1976) — Director: George Armitage
- Francis Gary Powers: The True Story of the U-2 Spy Incident (TV movie) — Director: Delbert Mann
- Roots (TV miniseries, 7 episodes)
  - Part II (1977)
  - Part III (1977)
  - Part IV (1977)
  - Part V (1977)
  - Part VI (1977)
  - Part VII (1977)
  - Part VIII (1977)
- The Spell (1977) (TV movie) — Director: Lee Philips
- Testimony of Two Men (1977) (TV miniseries) — Director: Leo Penn
- Sex and the Married Woman (1977) (TV movie) — Director: Jack Arnold
- Roots: One Year Later (1978) (TV movie documentary) — Director: Robert Guenette
- Cruise Into Terror (1978) (TV movie) — Director: Bruce Kessler
- Maneaters Are Loose! (1978) (TV movie) — Director: Timothy Galfas
- The Beasts Are on the Streets (1978) (TV movie) — Director: Peter R. Hunt
- Rescue from Gilligan's Island (1978) (TV movie) — Director: Leslie H. Martinson
- The Immigrants (1978) (TV movie) — Director: Alan J. Levi
- Emergency! (TV series, 2 episodes)
  - Greatest Rescues of Emergency (1978)
  - The Convention (1979)
- The Incredible Journey of Doctor Meg Laurel (1979) (TV movie) — Director: Guy Green
- Roots: The Next Generations (TV miniseries, 7 episodes)
  - Chapter 1 — 1880s (1979)
  - Chapter 2 — Turn of the 20th Century (1979)
  - Chapter 3 — World War I (1979)
  - Chapter 4 — The Great Depression (1979)
  - Chapter 5 — World War II (1979)
  - Chapter 6 — Postwar (1979)
  - Chapter 7 — The 1960s (1979)
- The Bell Jar (1979) — Director: Larry Peerce
- The Chisholms (1979) (TV miniseries) — Director: Mel Stuart
- The Castaways on Gilligan's Island (1979) (TV movie) — Director: Earl Bellamy
- The Rebels (1979) (TV movie) — Director: Russ Mayberry
- Son-Rise: A Miracle of Love (1979) (TV movie) — Director: Glenn Jordan
- The Seekers (1979) (TV movie) — Director: Sidney Hayers
- Breaking Up Is Hard to Do (1979) (TV movie) — Director: Lou Antonio
- Disaster on the Coastliner (1979) (TV movie) — Director: Richard C. Sarafian
- The Ordeal of Dr. Mudd (1980) (TV movie) — Director: Paul Wendkos
- Gauguin the Savage (1980) (TV movie) — Director: Fielder Cook
- The Silent Lovers (1980) (TV movie) — Director: John Erman
- Condominium (1980) (TV movie) — Director: Sidney Hayers
- The Wild and the Free (1980) (TV movie) — Director: James Hill
- Flamingo Road (TV series, 7 episodes)
  - Pilot (1980)
  - Illicit Weekend (1981)
  - The Titus Tapes (1981)
  - A Mother's Revenge (1981)
  - The Fish Fry (1981)
  - Bad Girl (1981)
  - They Drive by Night (1981)
- The Harlem Globetrotters on Gilligan's Island (1981) (TV movie) — Director: Peter Baldwin
- Murder Is Easy (1982) (TV movie) — Director: Claude Whatham
- American Playhouse (TV series, 1 episode)
  - For Us the Living: The Medgar Evers Story (1983)
- Return of the Man from U.N.C.L.E.: The Fifteen Years Later Affair (1983) (TV movie) — Director: Ray Austin
- Casablanca (TV series, 2 episodes)
  - Jenny (1983)
  - Divorce Casablanca Style (1983)
- A Killer in the Family (1983) (TV movie) — Director: Richard T. Heffron
- Dynasty (TV series, 3 episodes)
  - The Proposal (1983)
  - The Accident (1984)
  - The Voice: Part 1 (1984)
- Australia's Animal Mysteries (1984) (TV movie documentary) — Director: Barbara Jampel
- The Mystic Warrior (1984) (TV movie) — Director: Richard T. Heffron
- Embassy (1985) (TV movie) — Director: Robert Michael Lewis
- Napoleon and Josephine: A Love Story (TV miniseries, 3 episodes)
  - Episode #1.1 (1987)
  - Episode #1.2 (1987)
  - Episode #1.3 (1987)
- Drop-Out Mother (1988) (TV movie) — Director: Charles S. Dubin
- Roots: The Gift (1988) (TV movie) — Director: Kevin Hooks
- Star Trek: New Voyages — Phase II (TV series, 1 episode)
  - In Harms Way (2004)
- 20 Ways (2012) (short) — Director: Peter M. Kershaw
- Psyche Ascending (2013) (short) — Director: Peter M. Kershaw
- Unbelievable!!!!! (2016) (feature) — Director: Steven L. Fawcette

== Other music credits ==
- Hot Rod Rumble (1957) — Director: Leslie H. Martinson — (Musician: Oboe)
- To the Moon and Beyond (1964)- (composer). "To The Moon and Beyond is the title of a special motion picture produced for and shown at the 1964/1965 New York World's Fair".

== Awards ==
| Year | Award | Category |
|---|---|---|
| 1976 | Nominated — (Oscar) | Best Music, Original Dramatic Score "Birds Do It, Bees Do It" (1974) |
| 1977 | Nominated — (Primetime Emmy) | Outstanding Achievement in Music Composition for a Series (Dramatic Underscore) "Roots" (Part VIII) (1977) |
| 1977 | Won — (Primetime Emmy) | Outstanding Achievement in Music Composition for a Series (Dramatic Underscore) "Roots" (Part I) (1977) (shared with Quincy Jones) |
| 1980 | Nominated — (Primetime Emmy) | Outstanding Achievement in Music Composition for a Limited Series or a Special (Dramatic Underscore) "The Silent Lovers" (1980) |
| 1984 | Nominated — (Primetime Emmy) | Outstanding Achievement in Music Composition for a Limited Series or a Special (Dramatic Underscore) "The Mystic Warrior" (Part I) (1984) |
| 1988 | Nominated — (Primetime Emmy) | Outstanding Music Composition for a Miniseries or a Special (Dramatic Underscore) "Napoleon and Josephine: A Love Story" (1987) (Part III) |

== "The Ritual" (music from Star Trek, TOS) ==
Fried's underscore "The Ritual/Ancient Battle/2nd Kroykah", from the Star Trek episode "Amok Time" (1967) was featured in the 1996 movie The Cable Guy, starring Jim Carrey. It was also featured in two Futurama episodes, "Why Must I Be a Crustacean in Love?" (2000), as an alien anthem, in a Star Trek vs. Futurama fight scene "Where No Fan Has Gone Before" (2002), and in the dream sequence at the beginning of "Spock Amok", the fifth episode of Star Trek: Strange New Worlds (2022). It has also appeared in an episode of The Simpsons "Deep Space Homer" (1994). The score was also specifically chosen in the STS-133 Space Shuttle Discovery mission on March 4, 2011, as the morning wake-up music for the crew on Day 9 of the mission.
