= Arizona Raiders =

1965 western film by William Witney

- Theatrical release poster
- Directed by: William Witney
- Screenplay by: Alex Gottlieb; Mary Willingham; Willard W. Willingham
- Story by: Frank Gruber; Richard Schayer
- Produced by: Grant Whytock
- Starring: Audie Murphy
- Cinematography: Jacques R. Marquette
- Edited by: Grant Whytock
- Music by: Richard LaSalle
- Color process: Technicolor
- Production company: Admiral Pictures
- Distributed by: Columbia Pictures
- Release date: August 1, 1965
- Running time: 97 minutes
- Country: United States
- Language: English
- Budget: $400,000

Arizona Raiders is a 1965 American Techniscope Western film directed by William Witney and starring Audie Murphy.

== Plot ==
In 1865, following the end of the American Civil War, a ruthless band of Confederate guerrillas known as Quantrill's Raiders continues their violent rampage, refusing to surrender. Led by the infamous William Quantrill, the group is hunted by both Union and Confederate forces. Former Confederate soldiers Clint Stewart and his friend Willie Martin join the Raiders due to their lack of employment options following the war.

In Texas, Quantrill and his men raid a town, but the attack turns into a shootout. Quantrill is wounded after being betrayed by Montana Smith, an ambitious gang member hoping to replace him, and the gang is soon cornered by Union Captain Andrews and his men. In the ensuing skirmish, most of the gang escapes, but Quantrill is mortally wounded and Montana shoots Willie and Clint—who witnessed his betrayal—leaving them to be caught. The pair avoid a death sentence after Andrews testifies on their behalf, moved by a plea from Clint's younger brother Danny, and their distinguished war records. Meanwhile, gangmember Brady convinces Montana to lead the gang to Arizona to target Union gold shipments.

In 1866, Andrews is tasked with forming a territorial law enforcement unit, the Arizona Rangers, to counter the gang's heists. In urgent need of experienced men, Andrews recruits Willie and Clint by staging a prison break, offering them full pardons for their assistance. They meet with Andrews's other recruit, Danny. Andrews tasks Clint and Willie with re-joining the gang to uncover their next heist.

Meanwhile, Montana and his gang have seized control of the town of Panau, taking some of the Yaqui villagers hostage and killing the local priest. Martina, the chief's daughter, is taken as a slave and abused by Montana. Clint and Willie arrive in Panau, where Clint takes his revenge by killing Montana. Brady, taking his place as leader, invites the pair to re-join the gang, to help in their ultimate gold heist. Clint declines, however, intending to flee to Mexico.

En route, he is confronted by a heartbroken Danny who was sent to keep an eye on them. Willie takes Danny's side, preferring to remain a ranger. Danny reluctantly holds Clint at gunpoint, observed by two of Brady's men who were also sent to keep an eye on the pair, and they mortally shoot Danny. With his final breaths, Danny convinces Clint to change his ways. Announcing themselves as Rangers, Willie kills one of the gang, while Clint stands by as the escaped Yaquis capture the other for torture.

Clint and Willie return to the gang, claiming they want to join the heist, but Brady remains suspicious of the pair. That night, Willie secretly rides out towards town to alert Andrews of the heist, but is unknowingly followed by Brady's men, who bring him back. Realizing the pair are Rangers, Brady confronts Clint, who tries to convince him of his loyalty, and Willie accuses Clint of betraying the Rangers to help maintain his cover. Brady accepts Clint's explanation, but, despite Clint's pleas, he executes Willie.

In a nearby town, the gang ambushes the Union gold convoy and escapes. Clint meets with Andrews, leading him and the Union forces after the gang, pursuing them into a canyon as they attempt to flee to Mexico, but the Yaqui block the canyon. A fierce battle ensues, in which most of the gang is killed or captured. Clint chases Brady and, after a brutal fight, Brady is taken away by the Yaqui.

In the aftermath, Clint visits Willie's grave in Panau. Martina asks Clint to send a new priest to the village so they can continue learning how to live in peace. He leaves town with Andrews as an Arizona Ranger.

== Cast ==
- Audie Murphy as Clint
- Michael Dante as Brady
- Ben Cooper as Willie Martin
- Buster Crabbe as Captain Andrews of the Arizona Rangers
- Gloria Talbott as Martina
- Ray Stricklyn as Danny Bonner
- George Keymas as Montana
- Fred Krone as Matt Edwards
- Willard Willingham as Eddie
- Red Morgan as Tex
- Fred Graham as Quantrell/Quantrill

== Production ==
Murphy's salary for the film was $45,000.

== See also ==
- List of American films of 1965
