= The Last Wagon (1956 film) =

1956 film by Delmer Daves

- Directed by: Delmer Daves
- Screenplay by: James Edward Grant; Delmer Daves; Gwen Bagni (as Gwen Bagni Gielgud)
- Story by: Gwen Bagni (as Gwen Bagni Gielgud)
- Produced by: William B. Hawks
- Starring: Richard Widmark
- Cinematography: Wilfred Cline
- Edited by: Hugh S. Fowler
- Music by: Lionel Newman
- Color process: DeLuxe Color
- Production company: 20th Century Fox
- Distributed by: 20th Century Fox
- Release date: September 21, 1956
- Running time: 99 minutes
- Country: United States
- Language: English
- Budget: $1,670,000
- Box office: $1,500,000 (US rentals)

The Last Wagon is a 1956 American CinemaScope Western film starring Richard Widmark. It was co-written and directed by Delmer Daves and tells a story set during the American Indian Wars: the survivors of an Indian massacre must rely on a man wanted for several murders to lead them out of danger.

== Plot ==
Sheriff Bull Harper (George Mathews) has captured "Comanche" Todd (Richard Widmark), a white man who has lived most of his life among Comanche Indians, and is taking him to be tried for the murder of Harper's three brothers. The pair join a wagon train led by Colonel Normand (Douglas Kennedy). However, Harper's brutal treatment of Todd causes friction with some members of the wagon train.

Jenny's (Felicia Farr) young brother Billy (Tommy Rettig) is intrigued by Todd, who appreciates the boy's good-hearted attention. When the sheriff beats Clint (Ray Stricklyn) for giving Todd a pipe to smoke, Todd takes advantage of the distraction to kill his tormentor with a dropped axe. That night, while six of the young people have sneaked off for a late night swim, Apaches kill everyone else, except for Todd, who miraculously survives when the wagon to which he is handcuffed is pushed off a cliff. He is rescued from a cliff ledge by Jenny and Billy, who climbs down with a rope.

The Apaches are gathering nearby to avenge the massacre of more than a hundred of their women and children by whites. Grateful for having been rescued, Todd determines to lead the survivors to safety, despite the distrust and hatred of some of them. Along the way, he and Jenny fall in love. Jenny tells him about the marriage proposal she accepted, because her and Billy's parents are dead. Todd reveals to Jenny how he was raised by Indians. His father had been a traveling preacher who Todd traveled with. When he was eight, his father died far from any town. Todd stayed by his father's body for three days and was close to death when the Comanches stumbled upon them. They saved Todd and he was adopted and raised as one of their own. The group manages to travel safely for five days, avoiding a large nearby Apache war party.

Todd then notices that a small U.S. cavalry detachment has appeared, and the Indians have broken camp, concealing themselves. Todd saves all from an ambush, but he is recognized by the army and brought to trial. He reveals that the Harpers murdered his Indian wife and two young sons after they attacked his farm. After hearing from Jenny and others about how Todd saved them all, General Howard takes pity on him and places him in the permanent "custody" of Jenny and Billy.

== Cast ==
- Richard Widmark as Comanche Jonathan Todd
- Felicia Farr as Jenny
- Susan Kohner as Jolie Normand
- Tommy Rettig as Billy
- Stephanie Griffin as Valinda Normand
- Ray Stricklyn as Clint
- Nick Adams as Ridge
- Carl Benton Reid as Gen. Howard
- Douglas Kennedy as Col. Normand
- George Mathews as Sheriff Bull Harper
- James Drury as Lt. Kelly
- Ken Clark as Sergeant

== Production ==
The film was shot in DeLuxe Color and CinemaScope on location in Sedona, Arizona, at the mouth of Oak Creek Canyon, and mostly along Schnebly Hill Road. Director Delmer Daves described the difficulty of finding a pristine location for the film, as his previous western, Broken Arrow (1950), had popularized the region.

The film has some continuity errors. During the last third of the film, Tommy Rettig's hair goes from being long and fair with a fringe, to being short back and sides and dark and brushed back, and then back again on two occasions, once in the same scene. Rettig had formerly played Richard Widmark's son in both the 1950 film noir Panic in the Streets and the 1955 film The Cobweb.

== Reception ==
=== Critical response ===
Bosley Crowther of The New York Times dismissed it as "A familiar and unexciting journey across a plateau of western clichés", but commended George Mathews' portrayal of the sheriff, "The only character in the picture worth attention".

== See also ==
- List of American films of 1956
