= Ray Stricklyn =

American film actor (1928–2002)

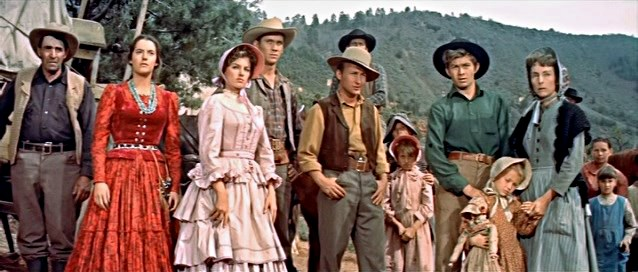
- Stricklyn (green shirt) in The Last Wagon (1956)
- Born: Lewis Raymond Stricklyn; October 8, 1928; Houston, Texas, U.S.
- Died: May 14, 2002 (aged 73); Los Angeles, California
- Occupations: Film, stage, television actor
- Years active: 1952–1998
- Partner: David Galligan

Lewis Raymond Stricklyn (October 8, 1928 – May 14, 2002) was an American film actor, stage actor, television actor, soap opera star and publicist. His acting career took off with B-movie Westerns that placed his boyish good looks playing opposite top talent of the time.

== Early years ==
Stricklyn was born in Houston, Texas; his father was a sign painter. At the age of 16 Ray Stricklyn auditioned for a part in the play Ah, Wilderness and was given the lead role. He went on to perform several roles for the Houston Little Theater.

In 1950 he won a scholarship to a New York drama school.

== Career ==
=== Stage ===
Stricklyn gained early acting experience in summer stock at the Litchfield (Connecticut) Summer Theatre. He made his Broadway début in A Climate of Eden by Moss Hart.

=== Film ===
George Seaton was in New York casting his 1956 film The Proud and Profane and gave Stricklyn a one-scene role. He then moved to Los Angeles to further his film career. Stricklyn also appeared in the role of Tim Hansen in the 1958 film The Return of Dracula. After his performance in Ten North Frederick (1958), he was given a contract with 20th Century-Fox, but it wasn't renewed following The Remarkable Mr. Pennypacker (1959). His first lead role was as Jesse James in Young Jesse James (1960), and he also had roles in The Big Fisherman (1959), The Lost World (1960), The Plunderers (1960), Arizona Raiders (1965), Track of Thunder (1967) and Dogpound Shuffle (1975). However, in later years he received fewer film roles and he returned to theatre work.

=== Television ===
Stricklyn played the role of adolescent 'Jesse' opposite Ida Lupino in 'That Woman' on Singer's Four Star Playhouse (1956). Stricklyn had the role of Howard Alston Hawkins in Days of Our Lives (1991–1992). He made two guest appearances on the CBS courtroom drama series Perry Mason. In 1960 he played defendant Gerald Norton in "The Case of the Bashful Burro," and in 1963 he played Reed Brent in "The Case of the Festive Felon." He portrayed Stanley in a 1961 episode of The Tom Ewell Show. In 1966 he appeared on the World War II drama Combat!, as Private Earl Konieg in the episode "Headcount". He also appeared in episodes of popular shows like Cheers, Seinfeld, The Nanny, Wiseguy, and many more.

=== Other work ===
Stricklyn took work in a fudge factory and then worked as a typist for a mailing company. In 1973 he joined the public relations firm John Springer Associates in Los Angeles and became one of the most influential publicists in Hollywood, working with some of the biggest names in entertainment, including Henry Fonda, Shelley Winters, Janet Leigh, Elizabeth Taylor, and Bette Davis. He also handled the US debut of the Rubik's Cube. He eventually became the head of the company's West Coast office.

In 1983 Stricklyn and Charlotte Chandler wrote a one-hour one-man show, Confessions of a Nightingale, about Tennessee Williams. Stricklyn portrayed Williams in the production, which was adapted from Chandler's interviews with Williams. Critic John Simon wrote in New York magazine: "Ray Stricklyn ... does a fine job as Williams. The accent may waver a bit, but all those small mannerisms, tics, idiosyncratic intonations, hesitancies, shifts of mood are fraught with authenticity."

Four weekend performances at the Beverly Hills Playhouse were planned but it was received so enthusiastically that it ran for over a year. Eva Marie Saint and her husband Jeffrey Hayden took out a full-page advertisement in Daily Variety urging everyone to see the show. He was twice named Best Actor of the Year by the LA Drama Critics Circle and LA Weekly. The show was then taken to Broadway and toured the US for another year. It was then performed at the Edinburgh Festival.

== Personal life ==
In 1965 Stricklyn was introduced to a furniture refurbisher named David Galligan and they became lifetime companions. Galligan later became a noted stage director.

== Later years and death ==
After falling ill with emphysema in 1997, he began writing his coming out autobiography. Published in 1999, Angels & Demons: One Actor's Hollywood Journey, published in Los Angeles by Belle Publishing, 297 pages, ISBN 0-9649635-4-X (hardback), is a candid and witty account of a man who, Stricklyn wrote, "might qualify as one who has had his 15 minutes in the limelight; perhaps even 20."

On May 14, 2002, Stricklyn died of emphysema in Los Angeles. He is survived by his sister, Mary Ann, and his longtime companion, Los Angeles stage director David Galligan.

== Partial filmography ==
Film

Year	Title	Role	Notes
1952	The Marrying Kind	Minor Role	Uncredited
1952	The Thief	Minor Role	Uncredited
1956	Crime in the Streets	Benny	Uncredited
1956	The Catered Affair	Eddie Hurley	
1956	The Proud and Profane	Casualty	Uncredited
1956	Somebody Up There Likes Me	Bryson	Uncredited
1956	The Last Wagon	Clint	
1956	The Rack	Ryson	Uncredited
1958	The Return of Dracula	Tim Hansen	
1958	Ten North Frederick	Joby Chapin	
1959	The Remarkable Mr. Pennypacker	Horace Pennypacker III	
1959	The Big Fisherman	Deran	
1960	The Lost World	David Holmes	
1960	Young Jesse James	Jesse James	
1960	The Plunderers	Jeb Lucas Tyler	
1965	Arizona Raiders	Danny Bonner	
1967	Track of Thunder	Gary Regal	
1975	Dogpound Shuffle	Mr. Lester Jr.	
1979	La ilegal	Ins officer	

Television

Year	Title	Role	Notes
1956	Singer Four Star Playhouse	Jesse	
1988	Square One TV	D. John Mutard	Mathnet segment, "The Map with the Gap"
1996	Seinfeld	Clarence	Season 8, Episode 10: "The Andrea Doria"
1991	Cheers	Ed	Season 9, Episode 16: "Wedding Bell Blues"

== Awards ==
Stricklyn received a Theatre World Award in 1952–1953 for his work in The Climate of Eden. He was nominated for two Golden Globe awards:

- 1958 – New Star Of The Year – Actor – 10 North Frederick
- 1960 – Best Performance by an Actor in a Supporting Role in any Motion Picture – The Plunderers.

== Press cuttings ==
Ray Stricklyn: Actor whose boyish looks became a hindrance Obituary by Tom Vallance in The Independent, 29th. May 2002, page 18. "Stricklyn stated that two factors had contributed to his lack of progress. First, his homosexuality (though he had well-publicised relationships with Joan Collins and Bette Davis) and secondly, his persistently youthful appearance."

== Quotes ==
- I was 27 and still looked 16, but there was a whole new crop of boys coming up who really were that age. I'd thought my career was going straight up. So like a lot of foolish young actors, I started living beyond my means. I bought expensive cars, got into debt. Once you think you're going to be a star, then you're not—it's a rude awakening.
