= Birds Do It, Bees Do It =

1974 film

- Film poster
- Directed by: Nicolas Noxon; Irwin Rosten
- Written by: Nicolas Noxon
- Produced by: Nicolas Noxon; Irwin Rosten
- Narrated by: Lee Bergere
- Cinematography: Albert Kohn; David Oyster
- Music by: Gerald Fried
- Production company: Wolper Productions
- Distributed by: Columbia Pictures
- Release date: June 7, 1974
- Running time: 90 minutes
- Country: United States
- Language: English

Birds Do It, Bees Do It is a 1974 American documentary film covering sexuality in the animal kingdom. It was directed by Nicolas Noxon (a regular crewmember for National Geographic's early television specials) and Irwin Rosten, and co-produced by David L. Wolper.

Thanks to its copulation scenes, the film was marketed with the tagline "So real it will never be shown on TV". The same scenes initially earned it an R rating from the Motion Picture Association of America; after a brief discussion between Wolper and then-MPAA chairman Richard Heffner, a few changes were made to ensure the eventual PG rating.

Birds Do It, Bees Do It received a nomination for Best Documentary at the Golden Globes. Gerald Fried's music earned an Academy Award nomination for Best Original Score. The film was screened at the 1974 Cannes Film Festival, but did not enter the main competition.

== See also ==
- List of American films of 1974
