= The Right of the People =

- Genre: Drama
- Written by: Jeffrey Bloom
- Directed by: Jeffrey Bloom
- Starring: Michael Ontkean; Jane Kaczmarek; Billy Dee Williams
- Music by: Billy Goldenberg
- Country of origin: United States
- Original language: English

Production
- Executive producer: Charles W. Fries
- Producer: Thomas Fries
- Cinematography: Gil Hubbs
- Editor: Leslie Dennis Bracken
- Running time: 100 min.
- Production companies: Big Name Films; Fries Entertainment

Original release
- Network: ABC
- Release: January 13, 1986

The Right of the People is a 1986 made-for-TV crime drama movie starring Michael Ontkean, Billy Dee Williams, Jane Kaczmarek, Jamie Smith Jackson and Lisa Jakub, with special guest John Randolph. It debuted on ABC on January 13, 1986. The movie, originally intended as a feature film, was written and directed by Jeffrey Bloom. He wrote the script in outrage over the mass murder during the robbery of a Los Angeles Bob's Big Boy restaurant in 1980. At the network's request, Bloom revised his original script to increase anti-gun viewpoints in the story.

== Plot ==
Christopher Wells is a District Attorney, in fictional St. Lawrence, Kansas. One evening, his wife, Angela, and daughter Katie, are among several people shot to death in a robbery by two ex-cons. Wells, previously opposed to handguns, then pushes for mass arming of his town's citizens for self defense, while his best friend, police officer Mike Trainor, and Angela's friend Alicia remain opposed. Nonetheless, Wells' proposal passes and the movie explores Bloom's visions of an armed public.

== Cast ==
- Michael Ontkean as Christopher Wells
- Jane Kaczmarek as Alicia
- Billy Dee Williams as Mike Trainor
- John Randolph as Hollander
- M. Emmet Walsh as The Mayor
- Jamie Smith-Jackson as Angela
- Janet Carroll as Marjorie
- Jeffrey Josephson as Styles
- Joanne Linville as Rosalind
- Scott Michael Wilson as Robbie Curtis
- Chuck Shamata as Phil Petroni
- Ken Pogue as Jay Brooks
- J. Winston Carroll as Detective (credited as Jay Winston Carroll)
- Kent Deuters as Robber
- Jeff Christianson as Robber
- Brock Johnson as Charles Hubert
- Lisa Jakub as Katie
- Nerene Virgin as Dianne Trainor (credited as Nerine Virgin)
