= Pat Fielder =

American screenwriter (1929–2018)

- Born: Patricia Marie Penny; April 16, 1929; Pasadena, California, USA
- Died: November 8, 2018 (aged 89); California, USA
- Education: UCLA
- Occupation(s): Screenwriter, TV writer, producer
- Spouse: Lawrence Fielder (div.)

Pat Fielder (born Patricia Penny) was an American screenwriter known for penning cult B monster movies like The Return of Dracula in the 1950s. For TV, she worked on everything from Baretta to The Rifleman to Starsky & Hutch.

== Biography ==
Pat was born in Pasadena, California, to Patrick Penny and Mary Lloyd. She attended John Marshall High and later UCLA, where she studied theatre arts; after graduation, she worked as a teacher before landing a job at Gramercy Pictures. After initially serving as a production assistant, she was eventually given the chance to write scripts, starting with The Vampire and The Monster that Challenged the World.

== Selected filmography ==
- Goliath Awaits (1981) (TV movie)
- Baretta (1977–1978) (TV series)
- Geronimo (1962)
- The Rifleman (1959–1962) (TV series)
- The Return of Dracula (1958)
- The Flame Barrier (1958)
- The Monster That Challenged the World (1957)
- The Vampire (1957)
