= Larry Duran =

American actor and stuntman (1925–2002)

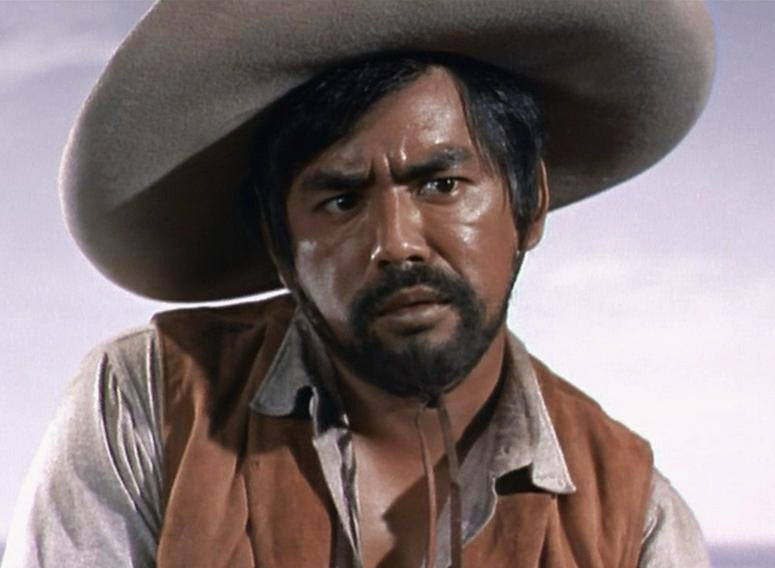
- Duran in One-Eyed Jacks, 1961
- Born: Lawrence Duran; July 26, 1925; Los Angeles, California, U.S.
- Died: November 27, 2002 (aged 77); Las Vegas, Nevada, U.S.
- Occupations: Actor, stuntman
- Years active: 1952–1997
- Spouse: Karen Duran
- Children: 2

Lawrence Duran (July 26, 1925 – November 27, 2002) was an American actor and stuntman. He was perhaps best known for playing Chico Modesto in the 1961 film One-Eyed Jacks.

== Life and career ==
Duran was born in Los Angeles, California, of Filipino descent. He became an amateur boxer while serving in the United States Navy for three years. After being discharged, Duran became a professional boxer before he was recruited by Marlon Brando to make his screen debut in 1952 in the film Viva Zapata!. This led to a lasting friendship between Brando and Duran who later often worked as a stand-in and double for Brando.

Duran was a stunt performer in films including What Did You Do in the War, Daddy?, The Towering Inferno, The Magnificent Seven, Naked Gun 33 1/3: The Final Insult, Guys and Dolls, Battle for the Planet of the Apes, The Ugly American, The Great Bank Robbery, Every Which Way but Loose, Mutiny on the Bounty, Time After Time, Conquest of the Planet of the Apes and Earthquake. Brando signed him for the role of Chico Modesto in the 1961 film One-Eyed Jacks. Duran co-starred in the 1967 film Good Times.

Duran guest-starred in television programs including Gunsmoke, Mission: Impossible, Fantasy Island, The Man from U.N.C.L.E., The Fall Guy, Buck Rogers in the 25th Century, Get Smart, Hill Street Blues, Vega$, The Six Million Dollar Man,The Wild Wild West, Barnaby Jones and I Spy.

== Personal life and death ==
Duran was married to Henrietta Munoz with whom he had two children. Duran died in November 2002 in Las Vegas, Nevada, at the age of 77.

== Filmography ==
Year	Title	Role	Notes
1952	Viva Zapata!	Young Farmer in Opening	Uncredited
1953	Tropic Zone	Minor Role	Uncredited
1953	The Wild One	Black Rebels Motorcycle Gang Member	Uncredited
1954	The Egyptian	Minor Role	Uncredited
1955	Guys and Dolls	Dancer	Uncredited
1956	Around the World in 80 Days	Minor Role	Uncredited
1958	The Flame Barrier	Bearer	
1958	The Young Lions	German Soldier	Uncredited
1960	The Mountain Road	Minor Role	Uncredited
1960	The Magnificent Seven	Calvera Henchman	Uncredited
1961	One-Eyed Jacks	Chico Modesto	
1962	Mutiny on the Bounty	Minor Role	Uncredited
1963	4 for Texas	Townsman	Uncredited
1965	The Hallelujah Trail	Brother-in-law #1	
1965	The Cincinnati Kid	Gambler - First Game	
1966	The Last of the Secret Agents?	Them #2	
1966	The Sand Pebbles	Brawler at Red Kettle Bar	Uncredited
1967	Good Times	Smith	
1968	Coogan's Bluff	Zig Zag	Uncredited
1968	The Boston Strangler	Police Officer	Uncredited
1971	Dirty Harry	Minor Role	Uncredited
1972	Lady Sings the Blues	Hood #1	
1972	They Only Kill Their Masters	Fisherman	Uncredited
1973	Lost Horizon	Asian Pilot	
1974	Hangup	Mexican Vendor	
1979	The Champ	Bowers' Handler #2	
1979	Buck Rogers in the 25th Century	Draconian Guard	
1979	The Glove	Cookie	
1980	The Kidnapping of the President	FBI agent	Uncredited
1981	Charlie Chan and the Curse of the Dragon Queen	Man Getting Traffic Ticket	
1987	Extreme Prejudice	Jesus	
1989	Cage	Chinese Guard #2	
1990	Solar Crisis	Bandit #3	(final film role)
