= Norma Eberhardt =

American actress (1929–2011)

- Born: July 8, 1929; Oakhurst, New Jersey, US
- Died: September 16, 2011 (aged 82); New York City, US
- Other name: Norma Eberhardt Dauphin
- Occupations: Actress, model
- Years active: 1952–1969
- Spouse: Claude Dauphin (1955–1978, his death)

Norma Eberhardt (July 8, 1929 – September 16, 2011) was an American actress who began her career as a fashion model. Her film credits included Live Fast, Die Young and The Return of Dracula, both released in 1958.

== Biography ==
=== Early life and career ===
Eberhardt was born and raised in Oakhurst, New Jersey. She was discovered by a fashion photographer as a teenager while attending an Easter Parade on the Asbury Park boardwalk with her mother. Reportedly, the photographer was struck by her two different colored eyes, one brown eye and one blue eye. The photographer, who was based in nearby New York City, assumed that Eberhardt was over the age of 18. However, when she commuted to his office on her seventeenth birthday, the photographer realized that he needed her mother to co-sign her modeling contract. He personally drove her back home to obtain her mother's permission and signature for the contract. Eberhardt soon signed with the John Robert Powers Agency, appearing in advertising campaigns on billboards.

=== Acting ===
Eberhardt's billboard campaigns soon led to radio, television and film roles. She moved to Los Angeles and was under contract with a studio by 1951. She rented a room at the Studio Club For Women in Hollywood, where she became roommates with actress Mary Murphy. (Eberhardt and Murphy would later co-star in the 1958 film, Live Fast, Die Young). Both actresses dated actor James Dean. Eberhardt, Murphy and Dean were all cast in small roles in the 1952 comedy, Sailor Beware, starring Dean Martin and Jerry Lewis. Sailor Beware marked Eberhardt's film debut, as well as Dean's second film role. Eberhardt also dated Jerry Lewis during this time.

Her second film role was in 1952's Jumping Jacks, which also starred Jerry Lewis and Dean Martin. She next portrayed an agoraphobic character locked up in a reform school for rich-girl delinquents in the 1953 film, Problem Girls, starring Susan Morrow.

Eberhardt is best known for two starring film roles during 1958. She co-starred with Francis Lederer in the 1958 horror film, The Return of Dracula. That same year, she co-starred with her real-life former roommate, Mary Murphy, in the crime drama, Live Fast, Die Young. Eberhardt and Murphy played two sisters who run away from home to pursue a life of crime as jewelry thieves who become affiliated with the mafia. The film, which was marketed with the tagline, "A sin-steeped story of the rise of the Beat Generation," struck a chord with its core audience and has become a cult classic. In an interview, Eberhardt mused on the film's cult popularity by speculating, "The film tapped into what kids were feeling—that society sucked and they were rebelling against it."

In 2007, Eberhardt's image from Live Fast, Die Young appeared on T-shirts worn by Slash, the guitarist for Guns N' Roses and supergroup Velvet Revolver. Eberhardt was described as "highly amused" when she discovered that her likeness appeared on Slash's wardrobe.

Eberhardt switched to television, including guest roles on Dragnet in 1959 and the CBS sitcom, Hogan's Heroes, in 1969. She also made an appearance on Celebrity Bowling, in 1971.

=== Personal life ===
Eberhardt married Claude Dauphin, a French actor and former member of the French Resistance, in 1955. Dauphin, who began acting in the 1930s, operated an underground radio station in Nazi occupied France during World War II. The couple divided their married life between residences in Paris, New York City, Ocean Township, Monmouth County, New Jersey, and Hollywood. Dauphin died in 1978.

She was a founding member and an honorary trustee of the Township of Ocean Historical Museum in Ocean Township, Monmouth County, New Jersey.

Norma Eberhardt died of a stroke at Lenox Hill Hospital in Manhattan on September 16, 2011, at the age of 82. She was survived by her 108-year-old father, George Eberhardt (1904–2014), and six brothers and sisters. Her funeral was held at the Church House of the Presbyterian Church in Shrewsbury, New Jersey.

== Bibliography ==
- DiSalvo Anthony. 2011. "Rachel Mayberry: The Girl Next Door Meets Count Dracula/An Interview With Norma Eberhardt" Interview by Paul Parla and Lawrence Fultz Jr. Movie Collector's World Magazine, September, 2011 no. 759.

== Filmography ==
- Live Fast, Die Young (1958)
- The Return of Dracula (1958)
- Marshals In Disguise (1954)
- Problem Girls (1953)
- Jumping Jacks (1952) (uncredited)
- Sailor Beware (1952) (uncredited)
