= Blood Beach =

1981 horror film by Jeffrey Bloom

- Theatrical release poster
- Directed by: Jeffrey Bloom
- Written by: Jeffrey Bloom
- Story by: Jeffrey Bloom; Steven Nalevansky
- Produced by: Steven Nalevansky; Sir Run Run Shaw
- Starring: David Huffman; Marianna Hill; Stefan Gierasch; John Saxon; Burt Young
- Cinematography: Steven Poster
- Edited by: Gary Griffin
- Music by: Gil Melle
- Production companies: Compass International Pictures; Shaw Brothers
- Distributed by: The Jerry Gross Organization; Compass International Pictures (United States); Shaw Brothers (Hong Kong)
- Release dates: September 1980 (Deauville Film Festival); January 23, 1981 (United States); June 24, 1981 (Hong Kong)
- Running time: 92 minutes
- Countries: United States; Hong Kong
- Language: English
- Box office: $2 million

Blood Beach is a 1980 independent horror film written and directed by Jeffrey Bloom and starring David Huffman, John Saxon, and Burt Young. An international co-production of the United States and Hong Kong, the premise, conceived by Steven Nalevansky, involves a creature lurking beneath the sand of Santa Monica Beach that attacks locals and vacationers. The film's tagline is: "Just when you thought it was safe to go back in the water—you can't get to it."

== Plot ==
In the opening scene, a woman named Ruth is walking her dog on Los Angeles, California's Venice Beach, and is suddenly pulled under the sand of the deserted beach by an unseen force. The woman's screams for help are heard by Harry Caulder, a harbor patrol officer who is swimming nearby. Harry reports Ruth's disappearance to two LAPD detectives, Royko and Piantadosi, who claim that without a body, there is little they can do. The next day, Ruth's estranged daughter, Catherine, arrives from San Francisco after Harry calls her regarding her mother's disappearance.

Meanwhile, the mysterious and crazed Mrs. Selden, who resides in an abandoned section of the Santa Monica Pier, witnesses the attack and disappearance (and others throughout the film), but does not come forward.

That night, while staying in Ruth's house, Catherine hears Ruth's dog barking on the beach near the location where Ruth disappeared. Catherine investigates and finds the dog beheaded, near a small sinkhole. Royko and Piantadosi, as well as Harry, are called to the scene, but police pathologist Dr. Dimitrious cannot accurately determine a cause of death for the dog. Royko and Piantadosi believe it to be the work of a serial killer, due to reports of other disappearances over the past few months.

The next morning, a teenage girl is buried in the sand at the beach and begins screaming. Her friends pull her out of the sand, only to see that her legs have been injured from an attack by an unseen creature. The police, led by Captain Pearson, begin an investigation by digging up various sections of the beach at night, but find nothing. The next morning, people visit the beach, which the local media have dubbed "Blood Beach".

The following night, Harry's co-worker Hoagy is closing up the harbor patrol office for the night when his girlfriend ventures under the pier to investigate a noise and is assaulted by a man. After being knocked to the ground by the girl, the would-be-rapist is attacked by the unseen creature, which castrates him.

An evening or two later, Marie, a French airline stewardess who is living with Harry, chases after her hat when it is blown by wind onto the beach. She, too, is grabbed by the unseen creature and pulled under the sand. The next morning, Harry sees Marie's hat on the beach, along with a small sinkhole which he recognizes as similar to the hole at the scene of Ruth's disappearance and the death of the dog. Harry calls the police, who dig up the area around the sinkhole and find Marie's disembodied eyeball.

Searching for the unknown creature's home, Harry ventures to an abandoned section of the pier and finds an access tunnel leading to an underground storage facility. After finding nothing, he leaves the tunnel, not noticing a movement in a collapsed section of the wall. Harry and Catherine go out to a nightclub, where they try to rekindle their romance. Meanwhile, a man with a metal detector is walking under the pier looking for metal objects when he is attacked and pulled under the sand by the still-unseen creature. The man's wife, Mrs. Hench, reports him missing. The next day, Royko and Piantadosi find Mr. Hench emerging from a sewer manhole in a Venice street after escaping from the creature's lair, but he is in a state of shock after being horribly mangled and cannot explain what happened to him.

Hoagy is the next victim, after he visits the pier to try to persuade Mrs. Selden to leave the area. He, too, is pulled under the sand by the underground creature while she watches stoically.

Having been told by Harry about the access tunnel, Catherine visits the storage facility under the pier to look around just as Harry brings Piantadosi with him to investigate. They find all 16 of the creature's partially-eaten victims, including Ruth's severed head, parts of Marie's body and Hoagy's fresh corpse. Captain Pearson arrives with the police, who remove all of the bodies. Pearson orders the officers to use a backhoe and equipment to track the monster down. Increased attention from the local news media lead the police to attempt to kill the creature as quickly as possible and Pearson orders the installation of motion detectors, heat-sensing cameras and explosives.

That evening, the huge creature emerges from the sand and is caught on camera; it resembles a worm-like Venus flytrap. Without hesitation, Royko activates the detonator and the creature is blown to pieces. Dr. Dimitrios points out that they still do not know anything about the monster's origins or abilities. Since it resembled a giant worm, and some worms have the capability to regenerate, Dimitrios wonders what will happen to "each piece".

The next morning, Harry leaves with Catherine to drive her home to San Francisco while the beach reopens to the public, now that the subterranean creature is dead. In the final scene over the end credits, as the beach becomes crowded again, new small sinkholes begin to appear unnoticed by most all over the sand, implying that Dr. Dimitrios was correct in his theory that the creature has the ability to regenerate from severed pieces.

== Cast (in alphabetical order) ==
- Laura Burkett as 1st Girl In Sand
- Darrell Fetty as "Hoagy"
- Mickey Fox as "The Moose"
- Marleta Giles as Girlfriend
- Stefan Gierasch as Dr. Dimitrios
- Marianna Hill as Catherine Hutton
- David Huffman as Harry Caulder
- Robert Jacobs as Saxophonist
- Pamela McMyler as Mrs. Hench
- Harriet Medin as Ruth Hutton
- Lena Pousette as Marie
- Jacqueline Randall as 2nd Girl In Sand
- John Saxon as Captain Pearson
- Burt Young as Sergeant Royko
- Otis Young as Lieutenant Piantadosi
- Eleanor Zee as Mrs. Selden

== Production ==
Jeffrey Bloom and producer Steven Nalevansky first got the central idea, a creature that hides in the sands of a heavily traveled beach, in May 1979. Two months after the initial idea and having written a synopsis, Bloom and Nalevansky were able to secure financing from Sidney Beckerman which allowed production to come together quite quickly with principal photography commencing in October of that year in Venice and Santa Monica, California over the course of 28 days, two days earlier than scheduled. The creatures were designed by Dell Rheaume. Two versions of the film were produced tailored for different markets. The first version left the origin of the creatures ambiguous and was designed for Western audiences, while the second version made for audiences in Asia included a sequence of a spaceship landing on a beach and dropping the creatures in the sand.

== Release ==
Blood Beach received trade screenings in December 1980, after which it was given a limited theatrical release twice in the United States: by the Jerry Gross Organization on January 23, 1981, and by Compass International Pictures in 1982.

The film was released in the U.S. on VHS by Media Home Entertainment. As of 2012, the film had only been officially released on DVD in Germany.

Alamo Drafthouse Cinema re-released the film in a limited 35mm screening on March 14, 2015 as part of the "NY! Hudson Horror Show" event at the Alamo Drafthouse in Yonkers, promoted by a new theatrical poster by artist Stephen Romano.

== Reception ==
On Rotten Tomatoes, the film holds an approval rating of 13% based on 8 reviews, with a weighted average rating of 2.6/10. Tom Buckley's review in The New York Times called it "a cut or two above the recent run of low-budget horror films" and praised the work of "an attractive and professional cast, a rarity in the genre", but noted that it was "undermined by plodding direction and a talky and incoherent script that is short on action, suspense and even the gore that the title promises". Buckley also criticized the cinematography, which he called "oddly blurry, as though someone had coated the lens with vaseline".

AllMovie's review noted: "The potential for campy fun in this premise is defeated by a completely straight, plodding detective story". Scott Weinberg of eFilmCritic.com also gave the film a negative review, writing, "Gore-less and bizarre, it's a tough one to track down. If you do search this one out, you should probably be out looking for a job". TV Guide awarded the film 1 out of 4 stars, noting: "Unfortunately, the film never rises to the level of its advertising."

== See also ==
- Sand Sharks (2011), another horror B movie about monster sharks lurking in the sand
- Tremors (1990), American western monster film about giant worm-like creatures living underground
- The Sand (2015), a horror movie about a creature that lives under the sand of a beach
