= Track of Thunder =

1967 film by Joseph Kane

- Directed by: Joseph Kane
- Written by: Maurice J. Hill
- Produced by: E. Stanley Williamson
- Starring: Tommy Kirk; Ray Stricklyn; H. M. Wynant; Brenda Benet; Faith Domergue; Chet Stratton; Majel Barrett; James Dobson; Buffalo Bob Smith
- Cinematography: Alan Stensvold
- Edited by: Verna Fields
- Production company: Ambassador Films
- Distributed by: United Artists
- Release date: September 15, 1967
- Running time: 83 mins
- Country: United States
- Language: English
- Box office: $2,500 (US)

Track of Thunder is a 1967 action drama film directed by Joseph Kane and starring Tommy Kirk. The film also stars Ray Stricklyn, H. M. Wynant, Brenda Benet, Faith Domergue, and Majel Barrett.

== Plot ==
Gary and Bobby are two stock car drivers who grew up together and both love the same girl, Shelley. Fake newspaper articles by Georgina Clark start appearing highlighting a feud between them. At first Bobby and Gary ignore the reports but eventually the rivalry becomes genuine.

It turns out Georgina is in cahoots with Maxwell Carstairs, manager of the racetrack, who has been hired by a syndicate to turn the sport into a lucrative gambling venture; the articles are to increase attendances.

Bobby's mechanic, Bowser Smith, exposes the truth. Bobby refuses to drive Carstairs' car in the big race so Bowser replaces him and is killed.

Bobby quits racing and settles down on a farm with Shelley. Gary becomes a champion stock car racer. Gary's father marries Bobby's mother and Carstairs is arrested for embezzlement.

== Cast ==
- Tommy Kirk as Bobby Goodwin
- Ray Stricklyn as Gary Regal
- H. M. Wynant as Maxwell Carstairs
- Brenda Benet as Shelley Newman
- Faith Domergue as Mrs. Goodwin
- Majel Barrett as Georgia Clark
- Chet Stratton as Mr. Regal
- James Dobson as Bowser Smith
- Paul Crabtree as Mr. Bigelow
- Sam Tarpley as Colonel Lee

== Production ==
Filming started in October 1966 and mostly took place around Nashville, Tennessee.

In real life, Tommy Kirk was a go-karting enthusiast. However he did not remember the movie fondly:

James Dobson was the other big star and he was a complete jerk... as far as I'm concerned, one of the most obtuse and insensitive people I've ever known in my life. I was fooling around with drugs at the time so I was about half awake in that film. I just sort of walked through it and took the money. I don't think it's a completely useless piece of trash like some of the other things I did, but it's not much of a film.

== Reception ==
=== Critical response ===
Variety wrote "characterizations are defiantly implausible, plot is predictable and dialog draws unintended laughs."

Film critic Renata Adler of The New York Times called it a "tired, cliché-ridden little movie" which should "discourage any similar projects about stock-car racing for some time to come" and "probably will dampen the hopes of any youngsters intending to make a career of slamming around a speedway in a churning mass of autos. The film is that dull." However it did allow some of the racing footage was "okay. The cars move, in fact, miles ahead of the plot and most of the performances" and that "there is some quite, steady acting, in the standard role of a worried mother, by Faith Domergue—more real acting than the lady ever achieved in her glamour-girl heyday."

== See also ==
- List of American films of 1967
