= La ilegal =

1979 film by Arturo Ripstein

- Directed by: Arturo Ripstein
- Written by: Fernando Galiana
- Produced by: Fabián Arnaud
- Starring: Lucía Méndez; Pedro Armendáriz Jr. Fernando Allende; Gina Moret
- Cinematography: Tomomi Kamata
- Edited by: Flo Williamson
- Music by: Nacho Méndez
- Production company: Televicine S.A. de C.V.
- Release date: 1 November 1979 (Mexico)
- Running time: 102 minutes
- Country: Mexico
- Language: Spanish

La ilegal (in English, "The Illegal One") is a 1979 Mexican drama film directed by Arturo Ripstein and written by Fernando Galiana, and starring Lucía Méndez, Pedro Armendáriz Jr., and Fernando Allende.

== Plot ==
Claudia (Méndez) is in love with Felipe (Armendariz), by whom she becomes pregnant, and after Felipe's marriage proposal, Claudia agrees to go to the United States, where she gives birth to their child. However, he has not yet gotten a divorce from his estranged wife. After discovering the relationship, Felipe's wife sends thugs to rape Claudia and record the act on tape, to be able to accuse her of prostitution and send her to prison, but due to being undocumented she is deported instead and her son remains in the United States. Desperate, Claudia looks for a way to get the baby back.

== Cast ==
- Lucía Méndez as Claudia Bernal
- Pedro Armendáriz Jr. as Felipe Leyva
- Fernando Allende as Gabriel Ramírez
- Cristina Moreno as Jennifer Leyva
- Gina Morett as Carmen Ortega (as Gina Moret)
- Jorge Luke
- Carlos Castañón as Coyote
- Claudio Martínez as Luis
- Jorge Patiño as Don Tony
- Sally Kirkland as Betty, Don Tony's girlfriend
- Carlos Nieto as Detective
- Ray Stricklyn as Police officer
- Armando Duarte as Police officer
- Peter Jason as Police officer
- Scott Wilson as Police officer
- Danny Faircloth as Pornographer
- Morgan Stevens as Pornographer
- Duncan McLeod as Judge
- José Luis Moreno as Driver
- Martha Meneses as Young Mother
- César Córdoba as Lieutenant
- Bo Silver as Chief of Police
- César Sobrevals como Court interpreter

== Production ==
The film was made during a time when movies featuring undocumented Mexican migrants (or "wetbacks") and Chicanos were in vogue, largely dedicated to cater to the Spanish-speaking U.S. market. The film has been described as a star vehicle for Lucía Méndez. The film's theme of migration to the United States was one of the few times Mexican director Arturo Ripstein stepped outside the strictly national framework of his filmography.

== Reception ==
The film has been criticized as a "telenovela".

In Cinema of Solitude: A Critical Study of Mexican Film, 1967-1983, Charles Ramírez Berg called the film "evidently a quick-and-dirty commercial outing—a good indicator of the kind of work Nuevo Cine auteurs were forced to accept during the López Portillo sexenio." Ramírez Berg pointed out that in the film,“ "Claudia is exploited not by evil gringos, but by other Mexicans. [...] Impregnated and then duped into coming to the United States by a Mexican man who abandons her and steals her child, she is then violated and shamed by his Mexican wife, which leads to her deportation. Reentering the United States, despicable coyotes (Mexicans who help other Mexicans cross the border for a fee) try to force her into having sex with them. Most wetback films are cautionary tales about the dangers of traveling north; La ilegal, in contrast, depicts Mexicans' betrayal of one another." Ramírez Berg also points out with respect to the end of the film, in which the Mexican consul helps Claudia to recover her baby, that while it "provides a hopeful alternative (Mexicans helping each other)", "the film's inner contradictions mount up and reverse the implication of much of what the film has exposed", saying that "the consul's deus ex machina heroics effectively stand the film's critique on its head. Mexicans are not compromised by the failures of their own system but by el norte, which contaminates all who came into contact with it," and thus "La ilegal gets the Mexican state off scot-free. Only those who—like the consul—maintain their loyalty to Mexico will remain impervious to the evils of the United States. By again externalizing the problem and ignoring the state's culpability, La ilegal becomes yet another system-affirming fantasy."
