= Good Times (film) =

1967 film by William Friedkin

- Theatrical release poster
- Directed by: William Friedkin
- Written by: Tony Barrett; William Friedkin (Note: uncredited)
- Story by: Nicholas Hyams
- Produced by: Lindsley Parsons
- Starring: Sonny Bono; Cher; George Sanders; Norman Alden; Larry Duran; Kelly Thordsen; Lennie Weinrib
- Cinematography: Robert Wyckoff
- Edited by: Melvin Shapiro
- Music by: Sonny Bono
- Production company: Motion Pictures International
- Distributed by: Columbia Pictures
- Release date: May 12, 1967
- Running time: 92 minutes
- Country: United States
- Language: English
- Budget: $1.115 million
- Box office: $800,000

Good Times is a 1967 American musical comedy film directed by William Friedkin in his feature directorial debut, starring Sonny & Cher. The film also co-stars George Sanders, Norman Alden, Larry Duran, Kelly Thordsen, and Lennie Weinrib.

== Plot ==
Sonny and Cher appear as themselves in this spoof of various genres, including mysteries, Westerns, Tarzan films and spy thrillers. The plot revolves around a film contract offered to Sonny by powerful executive Mr. Mordicus, played by George Sanders, who also plays the antagonist in each of Sonny's ideas for the proposed film, which are played out in a number of skits featuring music and dancing by the star duo.

== Cast ==
- Sonny Bono as Sonny
- Cher as Cher
- George Sanders as Mr. Mordicus / Knife McBlade / White Hunter / Zarubian
- Norman Alden as Warren
- Larry Duran as Smith
- Kelly Thordsen as Tough Hombre
- Lennie Weinrib as Leslie Garth
- Peter Robbins as Brandon
- Phil Arnold as Solly

== Production ==
Sonny Bono wanted to make a film starring himself and Cher. He was introduced to William Friedkin, a young documentary filmmaker who had just moved into drama and who, like Bono, was represented by the William Morris Agency. They got along well and Abe Lastfogel persuaded Steve Broidy to agree to finance a film. Broidy was former head of Allied Artists and had his own company, Motion Pictures International. Friedkin turned down the chance to direct second unit on Grand Prix (1966) to make the film.

Bono and Friedkin started reading through scripts and received a letter from novice screenwriter Nicholas Hyams, who suggested Sonny and Cher make a film about them making a film. Hyams was hired, but Friedkin says the collaboration with him was not easy: "He was condescending to Sonny and disdainful of me." Hyams was fired and Friedkin and Bono wound up writing the script themselves based on Hyams' original idea. The script is solely, attributed to Tony Barnett, who was hired to write the private eye sequence and there were other writers who came up with gags. However Bono also claimed he and Friedkin wrote it.

Broidy wanted to call the film I Got You Babe but Bono preferred Good Times, based on a song he was writing. All songs in the film were released on a soundtrack album.

The film was originally meant to be made for $500,000, of which Sonny and Cher were paid $100,000, but the budget came in at $800,000. Broidy then sold the film to Columbia for $1.2 million, ensuring he was in profit before shooting even began. Finance also came from the ABC network.

Producer Lindsley Parsons suggested George Sanders. Friedkin made this character a satire of Steve Broidy.

Filming started March 1966. By the end of the scheduled 20 day shoot there were still extensive sequences that needed to be filmed. Bono said this was due to Friedkin's desire not to compromise on production value. Friedkin arranged for an extra $100,000 to finish the film using his own non union crew and shooting guerilla style. (Variety put the final budget at $1,115,000.) Friedkin used Bill Butler, with whom he had worked on television, as cameraman; Butler said most of the new scenes were of songs.

Post production was difficult in part because Friedkin had a different way of working than editor Mel Shapiro.

In December 1966, before the film had been released, Broidy announced plans to make a second Sonny and Cher movie, tentatively called Ignaz, also to be directed by Friedkin and written by Jack Guss.

== Reception ==
=== Critical ===
Good Times received generally negative reviews as a pastiche of so-so skits, though one critic credited veteran character actor Sanders for making the film "slightly less unbearable." On the review aggregator website Rotten Tomatoes, 0% of 6 critics' reviews are positive, with an average rating of 4/10.

Friedkin later commented that "I've made better films than Good Times but I've never had so much fun". Filmink called it "A fun, clunky, experimental movie, more accessible than Sonny and Cher’s second film, Chastity (1969)."

"When I saw it I knew the picture wasn't going to work," said Bono. "By the time we had finished and released it, the country was off Sonny and Cher. We were considered corny, so our box office wouldn't be to teenagers. Little kids liked it. The market we had was gone because it was a real clean picture. my music was passe too".

=== Box office ===
According to Variety the film earned $600,000 in rentals domestically and $200,000 internationally. After the distribution fee, prints and advertising and the negative cost were deducted, ABC reported a loss of $1,050,000 on the movie as at 1973. Friedkin said "the film tanked" but his personal reviews were strong and he got offers as a result.

== See also ==
- List of American films of 1967
