= Dogpound Shuffle =

- DVD Cover
- Directed by: Jeffrey Bloom
- Screenplay by: Jeffrey Bloom
- Produced by: Jeffrey Bloom; Elliott Kastner
- Starring: David Soul; Ron Moody; Pamela McMyler; Ray Stricklyn
- Production company: ITC Entertainment
- Distributed by: Paramount Pictures
- Release date: April 30, 1975; (U.S.)
- Running time: 98 minutes
- Country: Canada

Dogpound Shuffle (also known as Spot) is a 1975 comedy film written and directed by Jeffrey Bloom and starring David Soul and Ron Moody.

== Plot ==
Two drifters, a former vaudeville dancer and a boxer, bond with a stray dog. When their dog is accidentally impounded, they form a song-and-dance act to raise money for the dog's release.

== Production ==
The film was financed by Lew Grade because he felt it had a possibility for a TV series. Grade never made a TV series based on the film, but because so little money was involved, he said he did not lose money on it.
