= Live Fast, Die Young (film) =

1958 American film by Paul Henreid

- Theatrical poster
- Directed by: Paul Henreid
- Screenplay by: Allen Rivkin; Ib Melchior
- Story by: Ib Melchior; Edwin B. Watson
- Produced by: Edward B. Barison; Richard Kaye; Harry Rybnick
- Starring: Mary Murphy; Norma Eberhardt; Sheridan Comerate; Mike Connors
- Cinematography: Philip H. Lathrop
- Edited by: Edward Curtiss
- Color process: Black and white
- Production company: B.R.K Inc
- Distributed by: Universal Pictures
- Release date: April 1958
- Running time: 82 minutes
- Country: United States
- Language: English

Live Fast, Die Young is a 1958 American film noir crime film directed by Paul Henreid and starring Mary Murphy, Norma Eberhardt, Sheridan Comerate and Mike Connors. Considered a cult film, promotional campaigns used the tagline "a sin-steeped story of the rise of the Beat Generation."

== Plot ==
Two sisters, Kim Winters (Murphy) and Jill Winters (Eberhardt) run away from their home and school. They escape to the city, where they become criminals and jewelry thieves.

== Cast ==
- Mary Murphy as Kim Winters / narrator
- Norma Eberhardt as Jill Winters
- Sheridan Comerate as Jerry
- Mike Connors as Rick (as Michael Connors)
- Peggy Maley as Sue Hawkins
- Jay Jostyn as Fred Knox
- Troy Donahue as Artie Sanders / Artie Smith
- Carol Varga as Violet
- Joan Marshall as Judy Tobin
- Gordon Jones as Pop Winters
- Dawn Richard as Mona
- Jamie O'Hara as Mary

== Production ==
Its working title was Seed of Violence. Troy Donahue was borrowed from Universal Pictures to play his role.

== Legacy ==
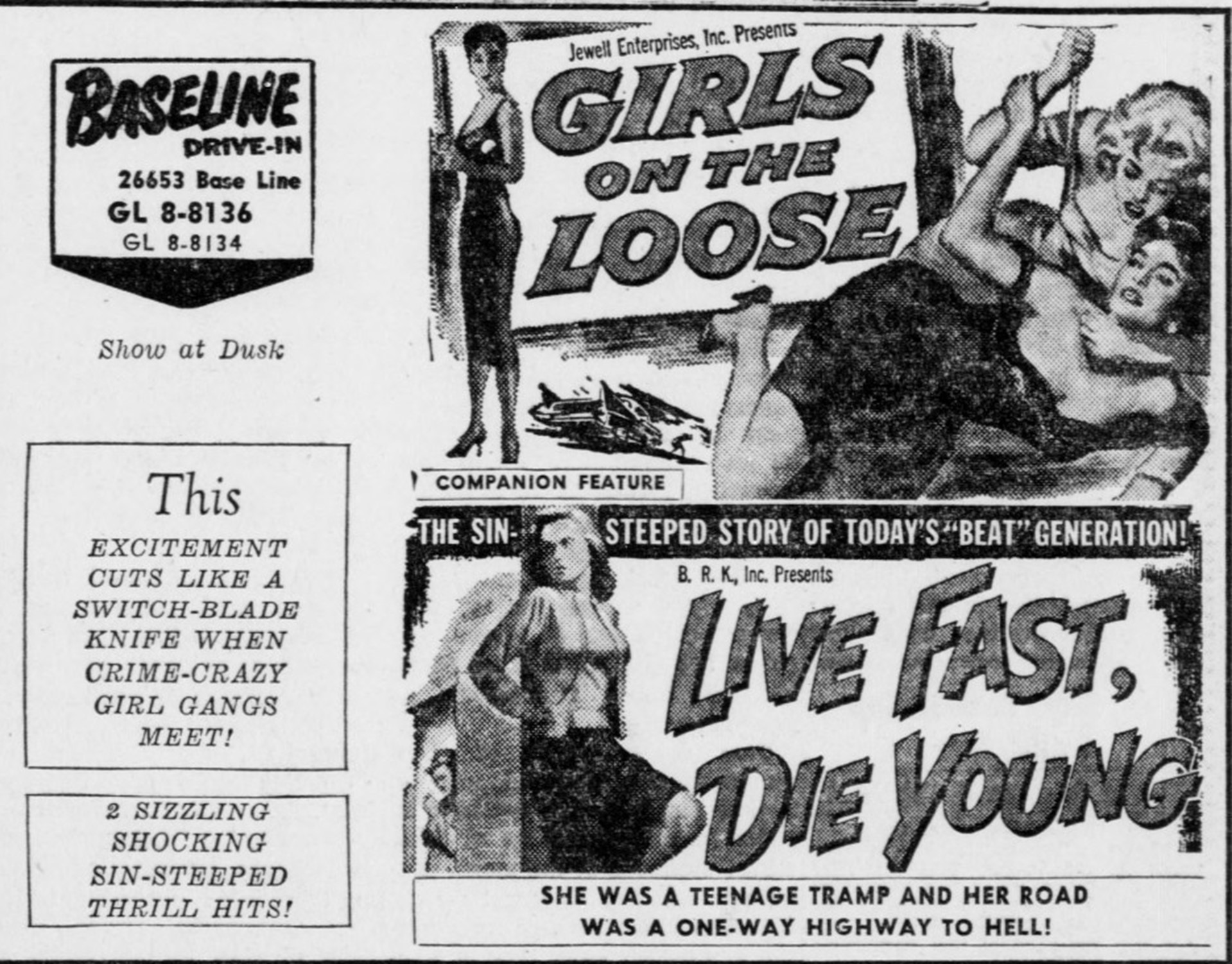
Drive-in advertisement from 1958

A cult classic, Norma Eberhardt noted that, "The film tapped into what kids were feeling – that society sucked and they were rebelling against it." Screenshots of Eberhardt were printed onto T-shirts worn by Slash, the guitarist of Guns N' Roses, in 2007. Eberhardt was described as "highly amused" by Slash's wardrobe.

== See also ==
- List of American films of 1958
