= The Return of Dracula =

1958 film by Paul Landres

- Theatrical release poster
- Directed by: Paul Landres
- Screenplay by: Pat Fielder
- Produced by: Jules Levy; Arthur Gardner
- Starring: Francis Lederer; Norma Eberhardt; Ray Stricklyn; John Wengraf; Virginia Vincent
- Cinematography: Jack McKenzie
- Edited by: Sherman Rose
- Music by: Gerald Fried
- Production company: Gramercy Pictures
- Distributed by: United Artists
- Release date: April 25, 1958
- Running time: 77 minutes
- Country: United States
- Language: English

The Return of Dracula is a 1958 American supernatural horror film directed by Paul Landres, and starring Francis Lederer, Norma Eberhardt, and Ray Stricklyn. It follows Dracula, who murders an artist aboard a train in Central Europe, and proceeds to impersonate the man, traveling to meet with his extended family in a small California town. The film is primarily in black and white, aside from one brief color sequence.

It was released on May 21, 1958, in Los Angeles by United Artists as the top half of a double feature with The Flame Barrier.

== Plot ==
In the Balkans, Investigator John Meierman and several assistants attempt to trap Count Dracula inside his tomb in a cemetery, but upon opening his casket, they find it empty. Nearby, Dracula, who has fled, boards a train. He murders Bellac Gordal, a Czech artist en route to the United States to visit his extended family in the small community of Carleton, California. Dracula proceeds to impersonate Bellac, assuming his identity. After arriving in California, Dracula, posing as Bellac, is met by Bellac's widowed cousin, Cora, and her children, the young Mickey and teenage Rachel. Rachel is especially eager to meet her cousin, as she has a shared passion for art, specifically clothing design. The family quickly finds Bellac's behavior eccentric, as he maintains a social detachment from them. The day after Bellac's arrival, Mickey's beloved cat goes missing and is subsequently found mutilated in an abandoned mineshaft.

Unbeknownst to the others, Bellac has established a secret resting place in the abandoned mine, replete with a coffin where he goes to sleep. Rachel is disappointed by his absence one day, as she hoped to show him the town, but she eventually meets him at dusk— he explains he spent the day painting. Rachel departs to her night shift at the local parish house, where she tends to elderly and infirm residents, including a blind woman, Jennie. After Rachel finishes her shift, Bellac awakens Jennie, and offers to give her the ability of sight before biting her neck.

In the morning, Rachel is summoned to the parish house and is driven there by her boyfriend, Tim. Rachel finds Jennie feverish and hysterical upon arriving, claiming a man entered her room through the window. When she attempts to get out of bed, Jennie collapses and dies. After Jennie's funeral, Cora and Rachel are approached by Mack Bryant, a detective appointed by Meierman. He asks about cousin Bellac and mentions that an unidentified man was thrown from a train to his death in Germany. Bellac appears at the home, and Bryant examines his immigration records and passport before meeting with Meierman outside to divulge his findings.

Bellac visits Jennie's tomb in the mausoleum and awakens her from the dead. Later, Bryant hears Jennie's voice beckoning him in the woods near the train station. When he goes to investigate, he is fatally mauled by a white wolf (portrayed by a white German Shepherd Dog). That night, Rachel invites Bellac to attend a Halloween costume party at the parish house the following day, but Bellac declines. Rachel confronts Bellac about his isolation from the family, but he remains evasive. Rachel later falls asleep while reading and has what seems to be a nightmare in which Bellac asks her to remove Jennie's crucifix pendant from her neck and offers her eternal life. In the morning, Rachel finds the crucifix lying on the floor, suspecting it was not a dream.

Meierman visits the parish house and confronts Reverend Whitfield with his findings. Meanwhile, before departing for the Halloween party, Rachel finds a portrait of herself in Bellac's room depicting her inside a coffin. When Bellac appears downstairs, Rachel grows terrified when she realizes his reflection does not appear in a mirror. Tim arrives moments later, and Rachel leaves with him to the party in a trance-like state. Whitfield and Meierman confront Rachel at the party, asking her to help them entrap Bellac. After finding Jennie's crypt empty, Meierman, Whitfield, and other police stake out the cemetery, where they soon witness Jennie returning to her crypt. Simultaneously, Rachel leaves the party and flees to the abandoned mineshaft to visit Bellac. As Meierman drives a stake through Jennie's heart, killing her, it causes Bellac to collapse before Rachel, who snaps out of her hypnosis and runs away from him in fear. Tim arrives at the mineshaft, having followed Rachel there, and finds her hysterical. Tim attempts to escort Rachel out of the mine, but Bellac blocks their exit and entreats Tim to join forces with him in "helping" Rachel, claiming the three of them will be the only ones to "survive this dying world" together. Rachel was wearing Jennie's crucifix and gives it to Tim to ward Bellac off. Bellac momentarily hypnotizes Tim and nearly gets him to drop the cross; Tim starts lowering it but Rachel snaps him out of the trance. Tim then approaches the vampire with the crucifix, forcing Bellac to fall into a shaft below. He is impaled through the back and chest on a large wooden post and disintegrates into a clothed skeleton.

== Cast ==
- Francis Lederer as Bellac Gordal / Count Dracula
- Norma Eberhardt as Rachel Mayberry
- Ray Stricklyn as Tim Hansen
- John Wengraf as John Meierman
- Virginia Vincent as Jennie Blake
- Gage Clarke as Reverend Whitfield
- Jimmy Baird as Mickey Mayberry
- Greta Granstedt as Cora Mayberry
- Charles Tannen as Mack Bryant
- Enid Yousen as Frieda

== Production ==
=== Casting ===
Francis Lederer's casting was announced in October 1957, when the film had the working title The Curse of Dracula. Norma Eberhardt and Ray Stricklyn's casting was announced the same month. Eberhardt recalled that Stricklyn's audition consisted of him lifting her and carrying her in his arms. She also stated that the film's producers were worried that his perceived homosexuality would be obvious onscreen: "[I said] "Oh, please!" Ray was nice. I'd go over to his place for dinner with him and his boyfriend Jim... I loved Ray. We were pals."

=== Filming ===
The Return of Dracula was produced through Jules Levy and Arthur Gardner's independent production company, Gramercy Pictures. Principal photography began in October 1957 in Los Angeles. The Bronson Caves in Griffith Park were used as a filming location, in addition to the Palms depot train station and Angelus-Rosedale Cemetery.

== Music ==
The Return of Dracula is one of a handful of horror films that use the melody of "Dies Irae" as its opening theme tune. Others include The Shining, The Car, and The Mephisto Waltz.

== Release ==
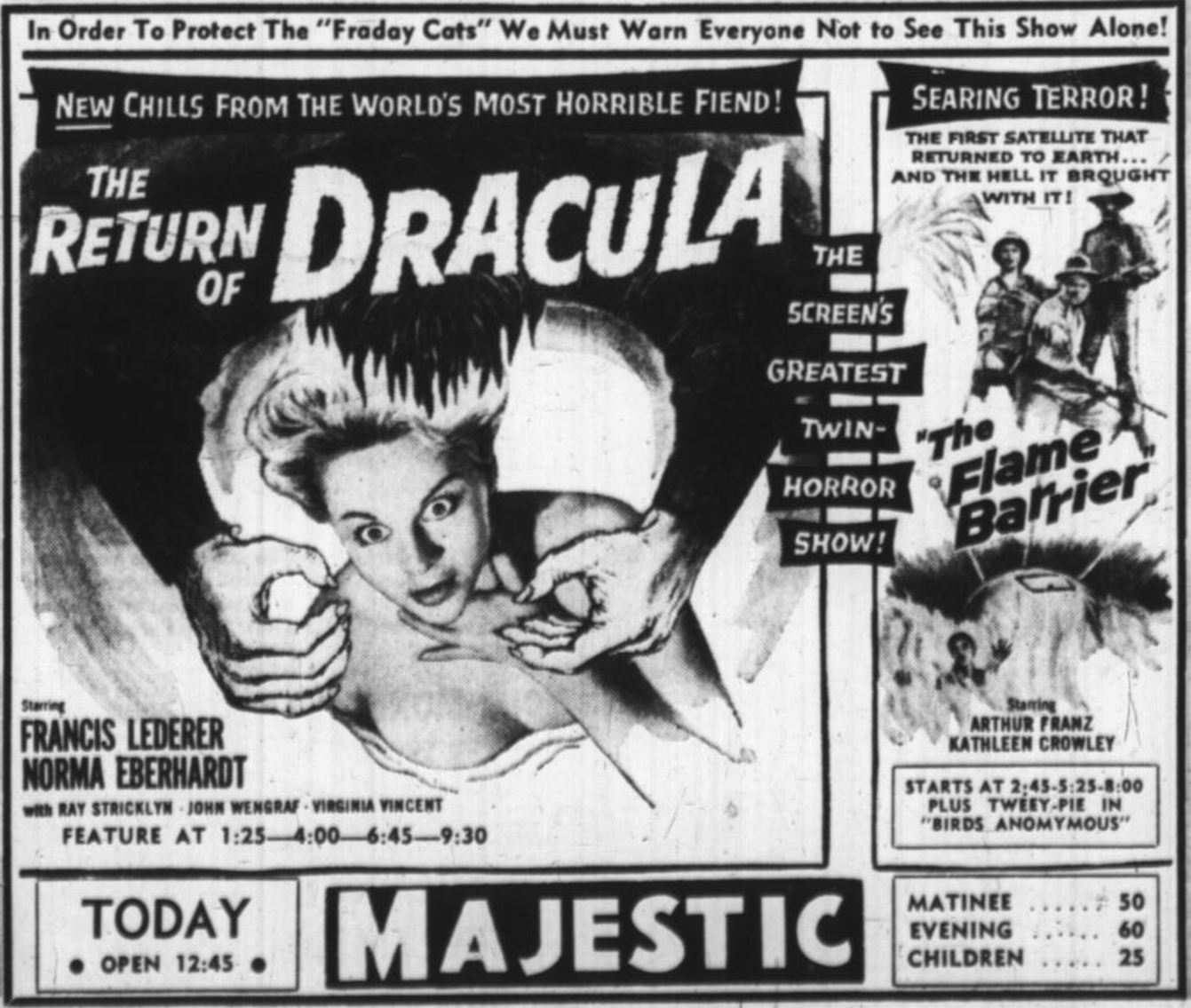
Advertisement from 1958 for The Return of Dracula and co-feature, The Flame Barrier

The Return of Dracula premiered theatrically as the top half of a double feature with The Flame Barrier in select cities such as Memphis and Seattle on April 25, 1958. It opened the following week on April 30, 1958 in Portland, Oregon.

It had its Los Angeles release on May 21, 1958. To promote the film, United Artists advertised that 12 insurance companies had refused to assume any liability risk for those admitted to see the feature.

In the United Kingdom, the film received a theatrical release on November 30, 1958.

=== Television broadcast ===
When shown on U.S. television, it was retitled Curse of Dracula. In the UK, it was released theatrically as The Fantastic Disappearing Man. Later in 1958, the Hammer film Horror of Dracula appeared in theaters in both the UK and the U.S. and The Return of Dracula was eclipsed as a result, due to Christopher Lee's new stardom as the Count.

=== Home media ===
The Return of Dracula was released on DVD by MGM in 2007 as a Midnite Movies Double Feature with Landres' previous film, The Vampire (1957). It was re-released on DVD as an exclusive release from Best Buy. Olive Films issued it on DVD and Blu-ray on October 18, 2016. The DVD and Blu-ray sales for Olive Films totaled $90,795.

== Reception ==
=== Critical response ===
Geoffrey M. Warren of the Los Angeles Times dismissed the film, writing that it "could have been put off indefinitely and no one would have ever known." Sara Hamilton of the Los Angeles Examiner alternately praised the film, describing it as "a first rate scare show with several sequences as nasty [and] horrible as you've ever seen."

== Legacy ==
On October 27, 1971, Lederer reprised his role of Count Dracula on an episode of Night Gallery titled "The Devil Is Not Mocked". In this story, Dracula tells his grandson how he fought the Nazis during World War II. According to actress Norma Eberhardt, Lederer considered The Return of Dracula "the worst film" he had ever made.

The film has attained a small cult following in the decades since its release. Writer Bruce Markusen described the film as one of the most underrated horror films of the 1950s, noting: "With its black and white imagery, fine music and careful direction from Paul Landres, The Return of Dracula succeeds as a highly atmospheric film that transplants the Gothic story into a modern-day setting. Its simple plot and lack of brand-name actors make it less than a classic, but it is good for what it tries to be: an amusing and frightening film, ideal for late-night viewing."

== See also ==
- List of American films of 1958

== Sources ==
- Donnelly, Kevin J. (2005). The Spectre of Sound: Music in Film and Television. London, England: British Film Institute. ISBN 978-1-844-57025-6.
- Markusen, Bruce (2021). Hosted Horror on Television: The Films and Faces of Shock Theater, Creature Features and Chiller Theater. Jefferson, North Carolina: McFarland & Company. ISBN 978-1-476-68461-1.
- Orwig, Gail; Orwig, Raymonds (2018). Where Monsters Walked: California Locations of Science Fiction, Fantasy and Horror Films, 1925-1965. Jefferson, North Carolina: McFarland & Company. ISBN 978-1-476-62797-7.
- Weaver, Tom (2025). Creature Feature Creators: Conversations with Genre Greats of the 1940s-1970s. Jefferson, North Carolina: McFarland & Company. ISBN 978-1-476-69432-0.
