= Sheridan Comerate =

American actor (1928–1973)

Sheridan Comerate (April 11, 1928 – April 16, 1973) was an American actor famous for his film roles in 3:10 to Yuma and Live Fast, Die Young. In television, some memorable appearances came in episodes in series like Twilight Zone (as gas station attendant in "Walking Distance"), and in "The Millionaire" where Comerate portrays a man who survives a horrific plane crash. In life, he died in a plane crash near Brick Township, New Jersey, in 1973 at the age of 45.

== Death ==
At about 4:20 a.m. on April 16, 1973, Comerate and five other people died when the Beechcraft Queen Air they were riding in disintegrated in midair over Brick Township, New Jersey. The pilot of the plane was reportedly flying stunts before the crash. The blood alcohol content of the pilots was over the legal limit for driving a car.

== Filmography ==
- Ford Theatre (TV series, episode "Miller's Millions")
- Jeanne Eagels (uncredited, 1957)
- 3:10 to Yuma (1957)
- Operation Mad Ball (1957)
- Casey Jones (TV series, episode "Death Rides the Tender")
- Playhouse 90 (TV series, episode "Project Immortality")
- Not One Shall Die (short film, 1957)
- Live Fast, Die Young (1958)
- Crash Landing (1958)
- Schlitz Playhouse (TV series, episode "Way of the West")
- The Millionaire (TV series, episode "The Ellen Curry Story")
- The Lawless Years (TV series, episode "The Big Greeny Story")
- The Twilight Zone (TV series, episode "Walking Distance")
- The Story on Page One (1959)
- Ice Palace (1960)
- The Detectives (TV series, episode "The Old Gang")
