= Jeffrey Bloom =

American film producer (born 1945)

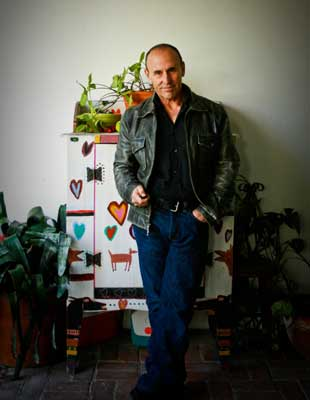
- Jeffrey Bloom in his studio
- Born: April 4, 1945 (age 81); New York City
- Occupations: Screenwriter; film director; film producer; photographer
- Years active: 1972–present

Jeffrey Allen Bloom (born April 4, 1945) is an American film director, film producer, screenwriter and photographer, currently residing in Studio City, California. His film projects include Flowers in the Attic, Nightmares, Blood Beach and Dogpound Shuffle.

== Early life ==
Bloom was born in New York City, to Sam and Ann Bloom. He is from a close-knit Ukrainian Jewish family. Jeffrey's family made several excursions from one coast to the other, finally settling in Los Angeles where Jeffrey attended John Burroughs Junior High. They then moved to the San Fernando Valley where Jeffrey attended San Fernando High School. It was in high school that Jeffrey developed an interest in acting and writing. He studied acting with the famous acting coach Jeff Corey. He began writing and supported himself through a variety of jobs, including a stint operating his own hot dog stand.

Jeffrey had a previous encounter with show business. He was a member of Magicapers, a mid-1950s magic performing group in the art of sleight-of-hand and stage magic. One highlight was a performance at the International Guild of Prestidigiters (IGP) convention in West Hollywood, circa 1955. Another important event was his adaptation with his cousin Stewart of Houdini's trick, "transformation," in which Houdini locks himself into a steamer trunk. When the trunk is opened, Houdini has been replaced by a lovely girl. In Magicaper's performance at John Burroughs, the school librarian was locked in the trunk, and out emerged Tony Curtis, whose younger brother was a student at the school.

Jeffrey pursued writing more and more, and finally his efforts were rewarded by having screen plays accepted, and developing a strong career as a re-write man. Bloom in later years went on to pursue professional photography and fine furniture making.

== Filmography ==
Film

Year	Title	Director	Producer	Writer
1972	Snow Job	No	No	Yes
1974	11 Harrowhouse	No	No	Yes
1975	Dogpound Shuffle	Yes	Yes	Yes
1976	Swashbuckler	No	No	Yes
1977	The Stick Up	Yes	No	Yes
1980	Blood Beach	Yes	No	Yes
1983	Nightmares	No	No	Yes
1987	Flowers in the Attic	Yes	No	Yes
2005	Opa!	No	Yes	No

Television

Year	Title	Director	Producer	Writer
1980	Swan Song	No	No	Yes
1981	Darkroom: Pilot, Catnip	No	No	Yes
1982	Prime Suspect	No	No	Yes
1983	Through Naked Eyes	No	No	Yes
1984	Jealousy	Yes	No	Yes
1985	Starcrossed	Yes	Yes	Yes
1986	Brotherhood of Justice	No	No	Yes
1986	The Right of the People	Yes	No	Yes
1990	Columbo: Columbo Goes to College	No	No	Yes
1990	Columbo: Pilot, Agenda for Murder	No	No	Yes
1990	Veronica Clare	Yes	Yes	No
1991	Columbo: Death Hits the Jackpot	No	No	Yes
1991	Fire: Trapped on the 37th Floor	No	No	Yes
