= The Monster That Challenged the World =

1957 film by Arnold Laven

- Theatrical release poster
- Directed by: Arnold Laven
- Screenplay by: Pat Fielder
- Story by: David Duncan
- Produced by: Arthur Gardner; Jules V. Levy
- Starring: Tim Holt; Audrey Dalton
- Cinematography: Lester White
- Edited by: John D. Faure
- Music by: Heinz Eric Roemheld
- Production companies: Gramercy Pictures, Inc.
- Distributed by: United Artists
- Release date: June 1957
- Running time: 83 minutes
- Country: United States
- Language: English
- Budget: $200,000

The Monster That Challenged the World is a 1957 black-and-white science-fiction monster film from Gramercy Pictures, (Note: Not to be confused with the identically named but unrelated PolyGram–Universal production label that was active in the 1990s.) produced by Arthur Gardner, Jules V. Levy, and Arnold Laven (who also directed), and starring Tim Holt and Audrey Dalton. The film was distributed by United Artists as the top half of a double feature with The Vampire. The film concerns an army of giant molluscs that emerge from California's Salton Sea.

== Plot ==
In the Salton Sea in California, an underwater earthquake causes a crevice to open, releasing prehistoric giant molluscs. A rescue training parachute jump is conducted, but the patrol boat sent to pick up the jumper finds only a floating parachute. One sailor dives in but also disappears. The other sailor screams in terror as something rises from the water.

When the patrol boat does not answer radio calls, Lt. Cmdr. John "Twill" Twillinger takes a rescue party out on a second patrol boat to investigate. They find the deserted patrol boat covered in a strange slime; the jumper's body then floats to the surface, now blackened and drained of bodily fluids. Twill takes a sample of the slime to the base lab for analysis, where he teams up with recently widowed Gail MacKenzie and Dr. Jess Rogers.

A young couple disappear after going for a swim. U.S. Navy divers investigate and discover a giant egg and the body of one of the victims on the ocean floor. The divers are attacked by a giant mollusc (which looks like a giant caterpillar), which kills one of the divers. The mollusc attacks the boat, but Twill stabs it in the eye with a grappling hook. The egg is taken to the U.S. Navy lab for study and kept under temperature control to prevent it from hatching.

The molluscs escape into an irrigation canal system, attacking livestock, a lock keeper, a trysting couple, and others. Navy divers locate a group of molluscs in the canal system, and use explosives to destroy them.

In the meantime, Gail is at the lab with her young daughter, Sandy. Worried about the laboratory rabbits being cold in the laboratory’s lowered temperature, Sandy surreptitiously turns up the thermostat. Twill calls the laboratory and gets no answer. He arrives and finds that the hatched mollusc has Gail and Sandy cornered in a closet, where they ran to escape from the monster. He fights it with laboratory chemicals, a CO_{2} fire extinguisher and a live steam line until other Navy personnel arrive and shoot the mollusc.

== Cast ==
- Tim Holt as Lt. Cmdr. John "Twill" Twillinger
- Audrey Dalton as Gail MacKenzie
- Mimi Gibson as Sandy MacKenzie
- Hans Conried as Dr. Jess Rogers
- Harlan Warde as Lt. Robert "Clem" Clemens
- Max Showalter as Dr. Tad Johns
- Gordon Jones as Sheriff Josh Peters
- Marjorie Stapp as Connie Blake
- Dennis McCarthy as George Blake
- Barbara Darrow as Jody Simms
- Robert Benevides as Seaman Morty Beatty
- Charles Herbert as boy with Morty's cap
- Jody McCrea as Seaman Fred Johnson
- Wallace Earl as Sally (credited as Eileen Harvey)
- Milton Parsons as Lewis Clark Dobbs, map expert (uncredited)
- Ralph Moody (actor) as Murdered Canal Watchman (uncredited)
- Byron Kane as Coroner (uncredited)
- Sara Selby as Mrs. Simms, Jody's Mother (uncredited)

== Production ==
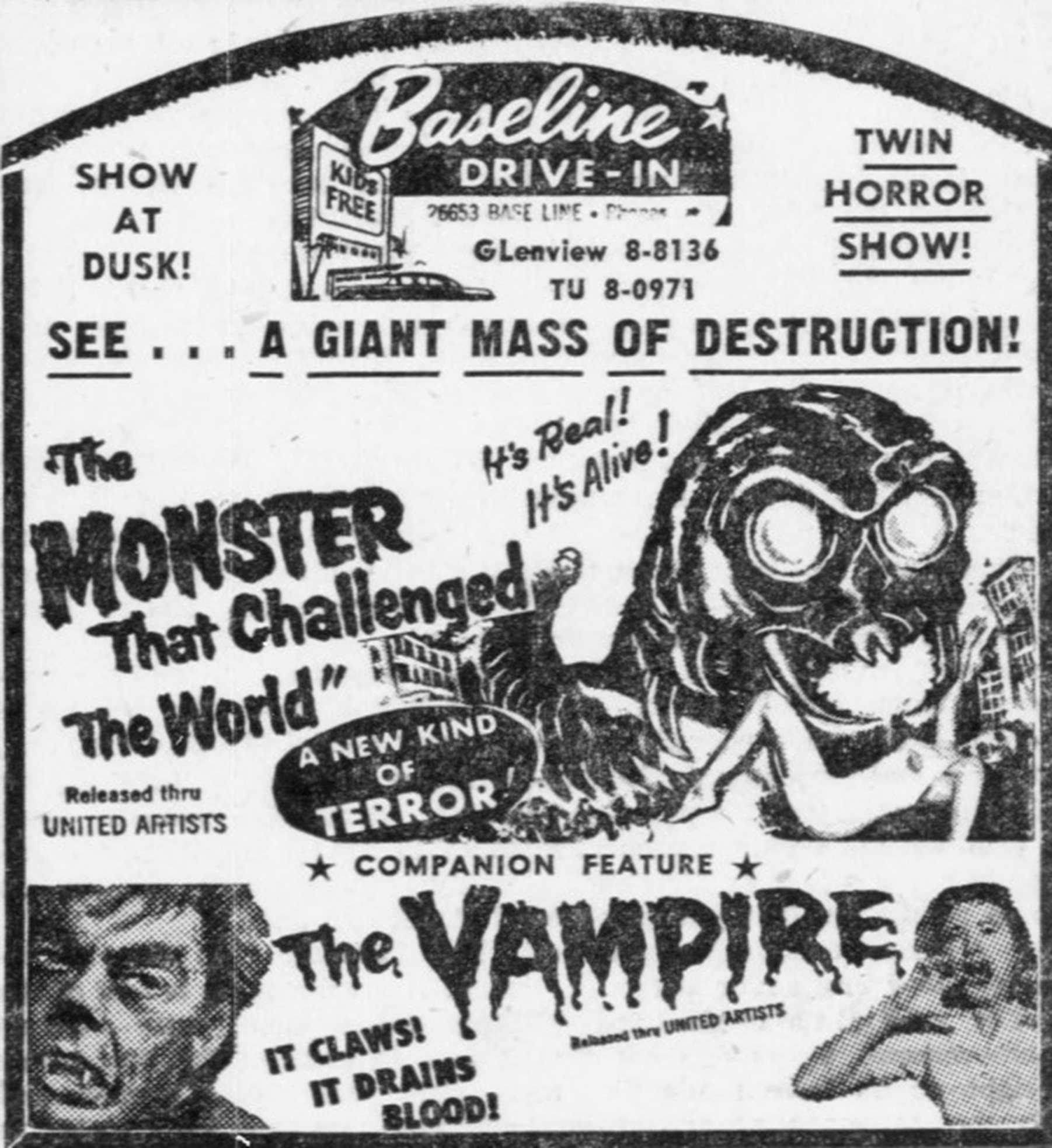
Drive-in advertisement from 1957 for The Monster That Challenged the World and its co-feature The Vampire

The story for The Monster That Challenged the World came from David Duncan, who also went on to pen screenplays for The Time Machine (1960) and Fantastic Voyage (1966). During production, Duncan's original work was titled The Jagged Edge, before the screenplay was renamed The Kraken. Prior to the film's release, it was once more retitled, this time to The Monster That Challenged the World.

Filming took place in 16 days on a budget of $200,000. A majority of the underwater scenes in the production were shot at Catalina Island off the coast of Los Angeles. Other primary filming locations included the Salton Sea, as well as Brawley and Barstow, California. The close-ups were later filmed in a tank filled with water and plastic seaweed.

In a 2016 interview, star Audrey Dalton recalled:

I thought it was a very interesting experience – as all my movies were in different ways. The director, Arnold Laven, had formed a production company with Jules Levy and Arthur Gardner. The monster stuff was fun, crouching behind a desk with a monster breaking down the wall. But you had to play it very straight. Once you start seeing the funny side of it, it doesn't work. Tim Holt had come out of retirement to do this movie. He was a quiet, very nice man – the most 'unactor' actor that I ever worked with. The film's poster features a woman in a bathing suit. People think it's me, but it was the actress whose character was drowned in the opening sequence. (Note: This scene actually occurs halfway through the film.) She's pulled into the water by the monster. We shot down on the beach for that. I think the rest of it was filmed along the California Aqueduct.

== Reception ==
A TV Guide review of The Monster That Challenged the World noted, "Fine special effects help this film along by adding an atmosphere of impending danger." A later review by author Dave Sindelar of Fantastic Film Musings and Ramblings remarked: "For some reason, this fifties monster movie doesn't get much respect, but I think it holds up extraordinarily well. For one thing, I think the characters are unusually well drawn for this type of movie, and they're given a dimension and a sense of realness that adds a lot to the proceedings".

Respect for the "monster" also dominated a later review of The Monster That Challenged the World in the Video Movie Guide: "This late-1950s sci-fi programmer is set apart by only one thing: the giant monster, which is life-size (not a miniature), and given plenty of screen time."

== Home media ==
The film was released on DVD as part of MGM's Midnite Movies collection, both by itself and as a double feature with It! The Terror from Beyond Space. Kino Lorber's Blu-ray release of the film features an audio commentary by Tom Weaver, Dr. Robert J. Kiss and David Schecter.

== See also ==
- List of American films of 1957
