= Orienta (album) =

Studio album by The Markko Polo Adventurers (Gerald Fried)
- Released: May 1959
- Recorded: 1958
- Genre: Exotica
- Length: 34:53
- Label: RCA Victor
- Producer: Simon Rady (Michael H. Goldsen, associate producer)

Orienta is an album by The Markko Polo Adventurers released in 1959. The album was produced by Simon Rady, arranged and conducted by Gerald Fried and recorded in stereo in Hollywood, California. The album uses a combination of sound effects and Asian-inspired music to tell humorous vignettes. Its suggestive cover art features a photograph by Murray Laden.

== Overview ==
Orienta was the work of three music industry professionals with a long history of involvement in exotica and easy listening music. Producer Simon Rady (1909-1965) was coming off the huge success of The Music from Peter Gunn, which spent 10 weeks at No. 1 on Billboard magazine's album chart, and won the inaugural Grammy Award for Album of the Year in 1959. Associate producer Michael H. Goldsen was one of the industry leaders in popularizing Hawaiian music and was later inducted into the Hawaiian Music Hall of Fame. The album was arranged and conducted by Gerald Fried, a Juilliard School-trained oboist who later went on to fame as a composer of music for motion pictures and television, including the 1960s series Star Trek, The Man from U.N.C.L.E., and Gilligan's Island, and the 1970s miniseries Roots.

Orienta was an attempt to capitalize on the popularity of exotica music in the late 1950s. The genre's popularity peaked in 1959 as Martin Denny's 1957 album Exotica spent five weeks at No. 1 on Billboard magazine's album chart. The album's liner notes stated that the music "resembles the dreams of an imaginative person who has fallen asleep during a 'Dr. Fu Manchu' movie on television," with vignettes that "combine the sounds of the East with the wit of the West; the charm of the Orient with the humor of the Occident."

The album was recorded in stereo and was designed to appeal to the growing popularity of albums demonstrating the capabilities of the new technology. The liner notes indicate that the producers sought to offer "sounds and effects to gladden the tweeters and woofers of the most critical hi-fi addict." While the album's producers noted that the album was "primarily a serious artistic effort," one later account noted that "Fried really intended the album to be something of a satire on the then-current craze for musical harem-haunting."

The album features a wide assortment of woodwind and rhythm instruments. The liner notes describe a recording studio filled with as many as 25 percussion instruments. Five of "the nation's top percussionists" were hired for the recording. The array of exotic instruments reportedly prompted one of the musicians to quip: "Why don't they hire that Oriental god with six or eight arms?"

== Track listing ==
The album contained 12 tracks, including original compositions and adaptations by Fried, Vernon Duke and Leon Pober.

1. "Song of India – Beggars' Procession" (Rimsky-Korsakov) – based on the "Song of the Indian Guest" from Rimsky-Korsakov's opera Sadko featuring ethereal female vocals, pedestrians talking, and wind chimes; Tommy Dorsey recorded the jazz instrumental version in 1937.
2. "Yokohama Ferryboat" – a composition featuring banjo, flute, vibraphone, and oboe, depicting a journey aboard an old ferry boat bringing commuters to Yokohama with sound effects of sea gulls, boat horns and the murmur of passengers.
3. "Rain in Rangoon" (Vernon Duke) – composed for the album by Vernon Duke, the song depicts a scene in which the garden activities of a Burmese maiden are interrupted by a storm; "she seeks refuge indoors until a final clash of thunder marks the end of the storm."
4. "Madam Sloe Gin's" – a comical composition depicting an American sailor wandering into the Singapore bar where "he finds Oriental honky-tonk jazz, booze and girls. Getting his fill of the first two, he leaves with the latter to seek further adventures."
5. "Girl Friend of the Whirling Dervish" – a composition depicting the scene as the girlfriend of a whirling dervish (practitioner of Sufism who whirls as a form of remembrance of God) asks a touring jazz group to accompany her friend, "the poor Dervish has a rough time catching the beat. He finally gets 'hip,' however, and turns out to be a swinger."
6. "Mountain High, Valley Low" (Raymond Scott) – the music frames the story of a Chinese princess who descends from her mountain sanctuary, addresses her subjects, and returns to the hills (voice of princess by Marni Nixon).
7. "Scheherazade" (Rimsky-Korsakov) – "The Arabian setting would not deceive the well-traveled American. Burlesque is burlesque . . . even in a Sultan's court."
8. "Limehouse Blues" – an Oriental version of "Frankie and Johnny" in which a girl shoots her cheating boyfriend and is arrested.
9. "Night of the Tiger" – a composition depicting a scene in which the roar of a tiger creates panic at an Indian festival "until the 'swish' of a hunting spear and the death cry of the big cat announce that the festival may continue in peace."
10. "Nagasaki" (Harry Warren/Mort Dixon) – in this arrangement of the Warren/Dixon jazz classic, the song begins in the style of a traditional Japanese orchestra, gradually changing to a "modern jazz and rock-'n'-roll" style.
11. "Train to Ranchipur" – a composition depicting a train ride through dense jungle and into a tunnel before arriving at Ranchipur; possibly inspired by the 1955 motion picture "The Rains of Ranchipur". The album's liner notes concede, "The odor of the packed coaches defies even hi-fi description."
12. "Runaway Rickshaw" (Leon Pober) – a composition by Leon Pober "depicting the plight of a rickshaw boy pulling an overweight tourist. The going is bad enough uphill, and the downhill ride is brought to a wild end amid flying merchandise from a peddler's cart."

== Critical reception ==
Professional ratings
Review scores
Source	Rating
Billboard	3/4 stars

When the album was released in the spring of 1959, Billboard magazine gave it a three-star rating ("Good Potential – Will Sell") and noted: "Here's an interesting stereo sound experience for stereo and hi fi fans. A wide assortment of woodwind and rhythm instruments offers exotic interpretations of a variety of off-beat selections. ... Effective wax. Sexy cover."

In his nationally-syndicated column, "The Record Shop," Dick Kleiner featured Orienta as one of "Dick's Picks" and wrote that "a group called the Markko Polo Adventures try new sounds on Oriental music in 'Orienta' with interesting results."

In his "Record Roundup" column, UPI music critic William D. Laffler wrote: "FOR HI-FI FANS: 'Orienta' by the Marco [sic] Polo Adventurers (RCA Victor LPM-1919) is a top platter for sound bugs. Exotic string instruments are used liberally. Sound engineering is tops." The album also received favorable mention by Norman Weiser in his nationally-syndicated column, "Recordially Yours."

Another reviewer wrote: "A percussion–happy group called the Markko Polo Adventurers, under arranger director Gerald Fried, make some interesting and frequently fascinating sounds in 12 instrumentals. It is atmospheric material, for the most part ... Hi-fi fans will like this one."

Not all of the reviews were positive. Hi Fi/Stereo Review wrote: "Zounds what sounds! Once through was all we could take of this. Interesting if you want to know how far out in musical left field it is possible to go."

In February 1960, the album was played as WIBA's "stereophonic concert."

== Revival of interest ==
The album experienced a revival in the 1990s and 2000s with increased interest in the ultra lounge and exotica genres. The album's seventh track, "Scheherzade," was included on RCA's 1995 compilation, History of Space Age Pop, Vol. 1: Melodies and Mischief. Two additional tracks, "The Girl Friend of the Whirling Dervish" and "Rain in Rangoon," were included on RCA's follow-up, History of Space Age Pop, Vol. 2: Mallets in Wonderland.

In 1997, USA Today columnist Sam Vincent Meddis wrote: "Strange old album covers don't fade away, they wind up on the Web. Like, who could forget that rousing 'Orienta' by the so-called Markko Polo Adventurers?" In the 1999 book Exotiquarium, Jennifer McKnight-Tronz and Lenny Dee noted the use of sound effects in "Runaway Rickshaw" and other tracks "to tell stories of humor, romance, intrigue and life across the Orient."

In his 2003 encyclopedia of popular music of the world, John Shepherd wrote, "In Orienta, a 1959 record by the Markko Polo Adventurers, the musicians' main intent was to combine the 'charm of the Orient' with the 'wit of the Occident.' This was achieved through an array of sensual 'oriental' percussion sounds combined with a touch of 'pop 'n' jazz.'" Shepherd suggested, "To a certain extent, the Adventurers and other 'extollers' of the exotic East ... foreshadowed the 1960s sitar fad triggered by Indian musician and composer Ravi Shankar."

Orienta was reissued on CD in 2004. Reviews of the CD have included comments and descriptions such as "a dreamy loungecore soundscape a la Les Baxter," "a shining example of the kitsch of the era," and the following: "Orienta features witty arranging for an unusual ensemble of virtuoso studio musicians. Many of the tracks sound like dramatic radio place settings ... a Hollywoody send-up meant to amuse rather than soothe. Certainly not to enlighten. Orienta is to Asian music as Get Smart was to the real business of espionage. ... Nothing's halfway here. It's way over-the-top cool. Recommended for those with a sense of humor."

In September 2010, the Adventurers' "Mountain High, Valley Low" was included on the él record label compilation Return to Paradise: A History of Exotica.

== Personnel ==
- Gerald Fried, arranger-conductor
