= Paul Landres =

American film director (1912–2001)

- Born: August 21, 1912; New York City, New York
- Died: December 26, 2001 (aged 89); Encino, Los Angeles
- Occupations: Film and television director and editor

Paul Landres (August 12, 1912 – December 26, 2001) was an American film and television editor and director. He directed episodes of The Lone Ranger, Maverick and Flipper, among many other TV series.

== Career ==
Landres was the son of Morris M. Landres, owner of the General Film Library. Over more than 20 years, the elder Landres had amassed thousands of newsreels and episodic films, and he made his film clips available to movie producers who needed historical footage and stock shots for their new pictures. He maintained libraries in both California and New York, before selling General Film to Frederick Ziv of Ziv Television Programs, Inc. for $100,000. Ziv promptly used the wealth of film footage for his new Yesterday's Newsreel TV series.

Paul Landres, growing up amid so much film, became interested in film editing. In 1937 he joined the editorial staff of Universal Pictures, where he worked on the studio's many feature films, "B" pictures, westerns, and serials. The studio underwent a change of management in 1946-47 and did away with its low-budget productions, which had been a mainstay of the company. Dozens of actors and staff members were dismissed, including Paul Landres.

Landres began working for independent producers Robert L. Lippert and Sam Baerwitz, and was recruited by his former Universal colleagues Cliff Work and Joseph Gershenson to edit their independent exploitation film Bob and Sally (1948). Most of Landres's work was for the budget-conscious Lippert, who allowed Landres to both direct and edit his projects. Landres's last editorial assignment was Hollywood Varieties (1950), which he also directed (in five days).

He worked in a variety of genres, and is known among horror and western fans for films like The Return of Dracula (1958) and Son of a Gunfighter (1965).

His proficiency with fast schedules and low budgets led him into television, where he specialized in westerns, including Brave Eagle, The Lone Ranger, The Cisco Kid, The Life and Legend of Wyatt Earp, Bonanza, and Maverick.

He left the industry in 1972, at the age of 60, and lived in retirement until his death in 2001.

== Filmography ==
His feature films include:

- Prescription for Romance (1937)
- The Road to Reno (1938)
- Destiny (1944)
- Senorita from the West (1945)
- The Daltons Ride Again (1945)
- Navy Bound (1951)
- Army Bound (1952)
- Last of the Badmen (1957)
- The Vampire (1957)
- Oregon Passage (1957)
- The Return of Dracula (1958)
- The Flame Barrier (1958)
- Johnny Rocco (1958)
- Lone Texan (1959)
- Go, Johnny Go! (1959)
- The Miracle of the Hills (1959)
