= The Vampire (1957 film) =

American film directed by Paul Landres

- Theatrical release poster
- Directed by: Paul Landres
- Written by: Pat Fielder
- Produced by: Arthur Gardner; Jules V. Levy; Arnold Laven
- Starring: John Beal; Coleen Gray; Kenneth Tobey; Dabbs Greer; Lydia Reed
- Cinematography: Jack MacKenzie
- Edited by: John Faure
- Music by: Gerald Fried
- Production company: Gramercy Productions
- Distributed by: United Artists
- Release dates: June 14, 1957 (San Francisco); June 28, 1957 (Los Angeles)
- Running time: 75 minutes
- Country: United States
- Language: English
- Budget: $115,000

The Vampire is a 1957 American horror film produced by Arthur Gardner and Jules V. Levy, directed by Paul Landres, and starring John Beal and Coleen Gray. Its plot follows a San Francisco physician who inadvertently ingests pills laced with the blood of vampire bats, leading him to take on vampiric qualities. Like 1956's The Werewolf, it offered a science fiction take on a traditionally supernatural creature, although the films were produced by different production companies. James Vance was Art Director, Jack McKenzie was the photographer, Don Robertson handled Makeup and Rudy Butler was Set Designer.

The film was released theatrically in San Francisco in June of 1957 as the bottom half of a double feature with The Monster That Challenged the World. When released to television, the film was given the alternative title Mark of the Vampire, though it is unrelated to the 1935 film of the same name starring Bela Lugosi.

== Plot ==
In San Francisco, the late Dr. Campbell had begun experimenting with vampire bat blood just before his death. Colleague Paul Beecher finds a bottle of pills among Dr. Campbell's effects and takes them home. Dr. Beecher's daughter, Betsy, accidentally substitutes the vampire blood pills for her father's migraine tablets. As a result, the kindly Dr. Beecher starts having blackouts from the pills.

During a consultation with patient Marion Wilkins, who suffers from congenital heart problems, Paul feels unwell and asks her to return the next day. The following morning, he receives a phone call notifying him that Marion has gotten progressively ill. When he goes to visit her, he finds her terrified by his presence, and she dies suddenly. On her neck, Paul finds two puncture wounds.

Worried about his recent blackouts, Paul returns to Campbell's lab where he meets his former college chum—now the head of the university’s psychiatric department and overseer of Campbell’s research, Dr. Will Beaumont. Beaumont is accompanied by a researcher, the oddly aloof Henry Winston to determine Campbell’s progress. Will tells Paul that Dr. Campbell's research involved regressing animals’ minds to a primitive state, then reversing the process as a step toward advancing the intellect from its normal state. Paul has many questions about Campbell’s work and the pills he developed. In the evening, Beaumont retires to a nearby hotel, leaving Paul and Henry alone, Paul hoping to learn more about Campbell’s pills. The next morning, Henry is mysteriously found dead with the same puncture wounds and inexplicable disintegration of the tissue on his neck. Later, Paul is called to the hospital to perform an emergency surgery, but is unable to focus and has to leave the operating room after completing the procedure.

When Paul realizes he is responsible for the series of local murders—which he has been committing during his blackouts—he arranges for Betsy to stay with an aunt for her own safety. Paul again confronts Will about the pills, but Will assumes Paul is in a delusional state. He agrees to stay with Paul to calm him, and locks the bottle of pills in a drawer. During the night, Will witnesses Paul's transformation into a vampire; Paul then murders Will, disposing of his body in a furnace.

The following day, Sheriff Buck Donnelly—suspicious that Will may be engaging in human experiments—goes to question him. At the lab, Buck finds an audio recorder that contains a recording of Will's murder. Meanwhile, Paul's nurse, Carol Butler, is opening his office when she is confronted by Paul, who urges her to go home. Before leaving, she notices a vial of poison, and realizes Paul may be planning to commit suicide. Before she is able to leave, she witnesses Paul transform into the vampire. Buck arrives shortly after, and witnesses Carol fleeing with Paul in pursuit. She runs into a nearby wood where she is attacked by Paul, but Buck follows behind and is attacked by Paul. As Paul is about to overpower Buck, Officer Ryan arrives and shoots Paul, who falls into a shallow culvert. As he dies, his monstrous body reverts to its normal appearance.

== Cast ==
- John Beal as Dr. Paul Beecher
- Coleen Gray as Carol Butler
- Kenneth Tobey as Sheriff Buck Donnelly
- Lydia Reed as Betsy Beecher
- Dabbs Greer as Dr. Will Beaumont
- Herb Vigran as George Ryan
- Paul Brinegar as Willy Warner
- Ann Staunton as Marion Wilkins
- James Griffith as Henry Winston
- Arthur Gardner (bit part)

== Production ==
The film was shot at Hal Roach Studios in Los Angeles, California, from December 10 through 16, 1956, (Note: Per the catalogue entry at the American Film Institute, shooting began December 10, 1956; as quoted in Toole and Stafford of Turner Classic Movies, the film was shot in a mere six days, which means the shoot concluded on December 16.) on a $115,000 budget.

== Release ==
The Vampire premiered theatrically in San Francisco, California on June 14, 1957, paired as the bottom half of a double feature with The Monster That Challenged the World. It subsequently screened in the same double-feature format in Los Angeles beginning June 28, 1957, (Note: Some sources erroneously claim that The Vampire screened only in San Francisco for a short time, but contemporaneous newspaper sources prove that it was shown in other cities, including Los Angeles beginning June 28, 1957, as well as in Boston and Philadelphia in September 1957.) and later in September 1957 in several East Coast cities, such as Boston and Philadelphia.

When released to television, the film was given the alternate title Mark of the Vampire, which is also the title of a 1935 film directed by Tod Browning and starring Bela Lugosi, though the films are unrelated.

=== Critical response ===
Tom Weaver of Fangoria said The Vampire was "one of the best independent horror films of the 1950s". In a retrospective assessment of the film, Nathaniel Thompson of Turner Classic Movies praised the film's "atmospheric" musical score and its blending of genres: "Taking a cue from Blood of Dracula, The Vampire minimizes the risk of bringing back a still out-of-vogue monster by introducing elements of science fiction, a far more popular genre on movie screens at the time". Michael Toole and Jeff Stafford, also of TCM, praised the film, noting: "Unfairly lumped with other grade-B horror flicks from its era, The Vampire (1957) actually deserves some credit for adding a new spin - pill addiction - to this overexposed horror genre and placing the story in a contemporary setting". Film critic Leonard Maltin gave the movie 2 stars out of 4, noting that it had some merit and singling out Beal's performance for praise.

== Home media ==
The Vampire was released on DVD in 2007 by MGM as a Midnite Movies Double Feature with Landres' unrelated subsequent film, The Return of Dracula (1958). In 2016, Scream Factory announced they were releasing the film on Blu-ray for the first time on April 11, 2017.

== Sources ==
- Flynn, John L. (1992). Cinematic Vampires: The Living Dead on Film and Television, from the Devil's Castle (1896 to Bram Stoker's Dracula). McFarland. ISBN 978-0-899-50659-3.
- Heffernan, Kevin (2004). Ghouls, Gimmicks, and Gold: Horror Films and the American Movie Business, 1953–1968. Duke University Press. ISBN 978-0-822-33215-2. Abstract available at Project MUSE.
- Warren, Bill (1997). Keep Watching the Skies!: American Science Fiction Movies of the Fifties. Jefferson, North Carolina: McFarland. ISBN 978-0-786-40479-7.
