= Steve Broidy =

American motion picture industry executive

- Born: Samuel Broidy; June 14, 1905; Malden, Massachusetts, U.S.
- Died: April 28, 1991 (aged 85); Los Angeles, California, U.S.
- Resting place: Hillside Cemetery
- Education: Boston University (did not graduate)
- Occupation: Film Executive
- Children: 2 sons, 1 daughter

Samuel “Steve” Broidy (June 14, 1905 – April 28, 1991) was an American executive in the U.S. motion picture industry.

== Early life ==
Samuel Broidy was born on June 14, 1905, in Malden, Massachusetts. He attended Boston University, but he was forced to drop out because of the Great Depression.

== Career ==
Broidy entered the film industry as a salesman for Universal Studios in 1926. In 1931, he began working for Warner Bros. Studios. He joined Monogram Pictures in 1933 as Boston sales manager and in 1940 was elected to the board of directors and named vice president and general sales manager. As V.P., Broidy took charge of operations early in 1945 and later that year was named president. In 1946 Broidy formed Allied Artists Productions and Monogram changed to that name in 1953.

He remained president of Allied Artists until 1965, when he left to form his own company, Motion Pictures International. As an independent, Broidy produced Good Times (Columbia), The Fox (Claridge Pictures, 1967), and 80 Steps to Jonah (Warner Bros.-Seven Arts, 1969). He also produced, uncredited, The Poseidon Adventure in 1972.

== Philanthropy ==
An active philanthropist, he received the Jean Hersholt Humanitarian Award from the Academy of Motion Picture Arts and Sciences in 1962, and was Founding Life Chairman of Cedars-Sinai Medical Center in Los Angeles. Broidy served on the MPAA Board of Governors from June 1960 through May 1969, and was their Second Vice President from 1967 to 1968. President of Temple Israel of Hollywood 1953-54.

== Personal life ==
Broidy had two sons, Arthur and Steven Broidy, and a daughter, Eleanor Sattinger.

== Death ==
Broidy died in 1991 in Los Angeles, California, following a heart attack, at the age of 85.
