= Nancy Hadley =

American actress (1930–2024)

- Hadley in 1956
- Born: Nancy Jo Hadley; August 1, 1930; Los Angeles, California, U.S.
- Died: December 28, 2024 (aged 94); Santa Clarita, California, U.S.
- Occupations: Actress; model
- Years active: 1950–1972
- Spouse: John G. Falvo (m. 1959; div. 1971)

Nancy Jo Hadley (August 1, 1930 – December 28, 2024) was an American actress and model who performed on stage, television and film.

== Early life and education ==
Nancy Jo Hadley was born at the Methodist Hospital in Los Angeles, California on August 1, 1930. Her parents were Paul Edward Hadley, a dried fruit distributor, and Jessie Morisee Cummings. Her parents divorced when Hadley was a toddler; her mother, with whom Hadley lived, remarried. Hadley had two younger half-siblings from her father's second marriage.

Hadley graduated from Huntington Park High School in 1948. She then went to a modeling school, and later worked for modeling agencies.

== Modeling career ==
From April 1950 on Hadley appeared in newspaper photo spreads as a model for California-based retail events, trade conventions, and fashion merchandise.

She also did television commercials from 1950 through 1956, being known as a "spare parts" girl. This meant that viewers saw only specific features of her, such as hands for a fountain pen ad, teeth for a toothpaste commercial, without seeing her whole face and body. The more traditional fashion modeling would continue even after she was an established actress.

Her modeling gigs would lead to a television appearance, on a local Los Angeles program called Hollywood Studio Party during April 1951. Later that year, she was selected as the photo representative for a heavily promoted musical called My L.A., which opened in Los Angeles in early December 1951. Though not a member of the performing cast, Hadley promoted the musical through photo ops and two more television appearances. Her exposure for the "My L.A." campaign also led to a brief recurring role co-hosting a local KTTV show. She left this program abruptly however to enter a series of beauty contests.

The culmination of her modeling career came in Spring 1952, when she won the title of "Miss Los Angeles", and was one of five finalists for that year's "Miss California" contest. This led to more live television appearances in the Los Angeles area.

== Early acting career ==
Hadley's acting career seems to have started at age 21 in March 1952, as the female lead in an original stage production, which is known only from a single advertisement. It was more than two years before she would act again, this time with some summer stock at Tustin, California. The Tustin Playbox, then in its third season, had just been taken over by husband and wife producers Sherwood Price and Cathy Browne. They rejuvenated the community theatre with young Hollywood professionals of their acquaintance, including Hadley. She had featured roles in two productions that season, Blithe Spirit and Petticoat Fever, each of which ran for two weeks. She then had a role in a professionally staged fashion trade show at the Pan-Pacific Auditorium, playing the first female US president.

== Television success ==
Hadley passed over doing summer stock in 1955 in favor of doing television shows. According to columnist Terry Vernon, Hadley's popularity with producers was due to a new gamine style haircut.

A trickle of shows in 1955 became a flood in 1956, including a recurring part on one series. Despite the work load she found time for three stage plays, including two dramas at the Tustin Playbox, Picnic and Come Back, Little Sheba. Her recurring role was a featured one on The Brothers, in which she played the girl friend of the younger brother. The series lasted only twenty-four episodes; Hadley appeared in about a third of them.

Her final television appearance in 1956 was for the National Bowl Football Game, held December 15 at the Los Angeles Coliseum. Hadley served as on-camera hostess for the charitable portions of the event, in which all proceeds went to the Kiwanis Crippled Children's Foundation.

== Tunnel of Love ==
Throughout 1957 she continued to average one television performance a month, while still doing stage work. She did a two-week run in Champagne Complex with co-star Joe Flynn under the direction of William Schallert at the Laguna Playhouse, followed by another two weeks doing the same play at the Tustin Playbox.

During October 1957 she opened with the touring company for the then Broadway hit The Tunnel of Love, playing with Tommy Noonan, William Bishop, and Narda Onyx to excellent notices by reviewers. So popular was the play that the tour was postponed for a six-month run at the Alcazar Theatre in San Francisco. Not until April 1958 could the tour resume with a six-week run at the Huntington Hartford Theatre in Los Angeles, where critics were almost as enthused.

Hadley told columnist Gene Sherman that after eight months of continuously wearing a wedding ring for the play, she got used to it and kept it on even after she got engaged for real.

== Later career ==
Following her extended stage run, Hadley returned to a busy television schedule from 1958 thru 1961. Westerns predominated among the many series she acted in, and about which she had some strong opinions, as expressed to interviewer Vernon Scott.

If I didn't work in westerns, I wouldn't be working very often... Except for screaming, and running from heavies into the arms of the hero, there's no opportunity for acting. Once in awhile I get a chance to beat out a fire or fall off a horse. And I've been shot a couple of times, too. I've only been killed twice though. Romance is out of the question. The hero usually gives you a slight kiss at the end of the show, but nothing very passionate because he has to have another girl in the next episode.

Her second film, Frontier Uprising in early 1961, would become a mainstay of television in later decades. She had the female lead opposite Jim Davis, and not for the first time, was cast in a Hispanic role.

Hadley was hired as a regular for The Joey Bishop Show in Summer 1961, and appeared prominently as Joey's girlfriend for the first seven episodes starting in October of that year. However, despite good ratings, she and four other regulars were fired by November 1961, prompting a suggestion that the show be renamed to "Exodus".

From then on television roles were few and far between. She was now thirty-one, an age at which leading women in television who hadn't yet reached full star status either turned to character acting or faded away. From 1962 thru 1966 she had only one or two television roles per year, followed by four years without any screen acting jobs. She did her third film role in 1970, in which she had a small part as Alvy Moore's wife for The Late Liz, followed by two last television appearances.

== Personal life and death ==
Publicity surrounding her choice as Miss Los Angeles revealed she was 5' 5" tall and weighed 117 pounds at age 21, with brown hair and dark blue eyes. She was a health and exercise enthusiast, which enabled her to continue modeling clothes into her thirties.

Hadley married John G. Falvo a writer and producer, in January 1959. Columnists announced the couple had sunk their savings into their new production company, Alger Films, which was to make a movie Falvo had written and in which they both would perform. They also bought a home in Sherman Oaks, the address and price of which an indiscreet realtor provided to the newspapers.

The couple had three sons together, but were divorced on December 1, 1971. Hadley appears to have resided in Pasadena, California since retiring from show business.

Hadley died in Santa Clarita, California on December 28, 2024, at the age of 94.

== Stage performances ==
Listed by year of first performance
Year	Play	Role	Venue	Notes
1952	San Juan Outpost		Glendale Centre Theatre	Her stage debut was as the female lead in a locally written play
1954	Blithe Spirit	Edith	Tustin Playbox	Hadley started at Tustin playing a psychic housemaid
1954	Petticoat Fever	Clara Wilson	Tustin Playbox	Some newspapers mistakenly credited Hadley as "Nancy Bradley"
1954	Glamorama	President	Pan-Pacific Auditorium	Professionally staged trade show had Hadley as first female US president
1956	Maryella	Maryella	Glendale Centre Theatre	Hadley likely did more plays here than can be documented
1956	Picnic	Millie	Tustin Playbox	Critic praised her tomboy role as a romp
1956	Come Back, Little Sheba	Marie	Tustin Playbox	She drew good reviews as the young college boarder
1957	Champagne Complex	Allyn Macy	Laguna Playhouse; Tustin Playbox	Four week run at two theatres with co-star Joe Flynn
1957	The Tunnel of Love	Isolde Poole	Alcazar Theatre	A six-month run in San Francisco was followed....
1958	The Tunnel of Love	Isolde Poole	Huntington Hartford Theatre	....by a six-week run in Los Angeles

== Filmography ==
Film (by year of first release)
Year	Title	Role	Notes
1952	Ellis in Freedomland	Female Model	Undistributed training film for Westinghouse sales reps used dozens of Hollywood stars
1961	Frontier Uprising	Consuelo Montalvo	
1971	The Late Liz	Edie Morris	

Television (in original broadcast order) excluding commercials
Year	Series	Episode	Role	Notes
1951	Hollywood Studio Party	(1951-04-20)	Herself	Local variety show hosted by Jack Wheeler on KTTV; she won "Photo Fair" contest
1951	Hi Talent Battle	(1951-11-23)	Herself	Hadley judges winner on KLAC high school talent contest
1951	Vine Street Varieties	(1951-11-28)	Herself	Hadley appeared with host Buzz Adlam on a local KECA show
1952	Calo Pet Exchange	4 episodes	Herself	Hadley did four appearances with host Frank Wright on local KTTV show
1952	Ladies Matinee	(1952-05-05)	Herself	Hadley appeared after winning Miss LA title with host Jack Rourke on local KTTV show
1952	Glamour Session	(1952-07-09)	Herself	As Miss LA, Hadley appeared with hostess Rita LaRoy on local KTTV show
1955	Luke and the Tenderfoot	The Boston Kid	Miss Meacham	Unsold pilot, not broadcast until 1965.
1955	Those Whiting Girls	Barbara's Rival	Vickie Fleming	Transfer co-ed Hadley gives UCLA junior Barbara Whiting competition
1955	Cavalcade of America	Swamp Mutiny	Nancy Crofts	With Hans Conried as Francis Marion, Barry Kelley, and Ron Randell
1956	Highway Patrol	Mountain Copter	Frieda Hollis	
1956	The George Burns and Gracie Allen Show	George Goes Skiing	Tina Clayton	
1956	The Millionaire	The Cindy Bowen Story	Jessica Marlowe	
1956	The George Burns and Gracie Allen Show	Ronnie Gets an Agent	Sally Fletcher	
1956	Medic	If Tomorrow Be Sad	Stella	
1956	Frontier	The Ballad of Pretty Polly	Polly	Modern reworking of the traditional ballad into a triangle
1956	The Ford Television Theatre	The Alibi	Sybil Glennon	Hadley features as an 1890 stage actress
1956	Schlitz Playhouse	The Happy Sun		Walter Brennan starred as a Finnish lumbarjack
1956	Big Town	Fake S.O.S.		Mark Stevens recruited Tustin Playbox actors for his series
1956	Dr. Hudson's Secret Journal	The Caroline Story	Caroline	
1956	The Brothers	Gilly's Birthday	Marilee Dorf	Hadley had a recurring role on this series
1956	The Brothers	Dorf's Photo Machine	Marilee Dorf	
1956	The Brothers	The Quadrangle	Marilee Dorf	
1956	The Brothers	The Babies	Marilee Dorf	
1956	National Bowl Football Game	(1956-12-15)	Herself	Hadley served as on-camera hostess for charity game
1957	The Brothers	The Brave Ones	Marilee Dorf	
1957	The Sheriff of Cochise	Grandfather Grandson	Alice	Star John Bromfield also raided the Tustin Playbox for actors
1957	The Brothers	Prisoners of Love	Marilee Dorf	Hadley's character befriends three female prison escapees
1957	The Brothers	Stop That Bookmaking Up There	Marilee Dorf	
1957	The Brothers	Picnic	Marilee Dorf	
1957	The Gale Storm Show	Wedding in Majorca	Vickie Chapman	
1957	Code 3	The Water Skier	Marge Bentley	
1957	Climax!	The High Jungle		
1957	Personal Report, Inc.	(Pilot Episode)	Diana Welles	This unsold pilot was never broadcast (Note: Some sources credit this as being made in 1958 or 1959, but the copyright notice on the credits listing has "MCMLVII".)
1957	Perry Mason	The Case of the Sleepwalker's Niece	Edna Hammar	Her character is unlucky in love
1957	The Life and Legend of Wyatt Earp	Woman Trouble	Jennie Brant	Hadley plays against type as a deceiver
1957	Mr. Adams and Eve	The Service Story		
1958	Love That Jill	Tonight's the Night	Melody - Model	Opening episode of critic panned series features Hadley
1958	Official Detective	The Cover-up	Diana	
1958	Matinee Theatre	The End of a Season	(Sister-in-law)	Pianist (Grant Williams) regains sight and dumps wife for her sister
1958	Studio One	The Undiscovered	Helen	Doctors develop vaccine for common cold but...
1958	Bat Masterson	Dude's Folly	Jan Larkin	Hadley's character reopens late father's store
1958	Jefferson Drum	Prison Hill	Ellie Drake	
1958	The Rough Riders	The Counterfeiters	Alice Thompson	Hadley plays widowed teacher who discovers counterfeit money
1958	Have Gun – Will Travel	Something To Live For	Lane Evans	Her character is called "Lane", short for "Elaine"
1958	The Life and Legend of Wyatt Earp	The Reformation of Doc Holliday	Marci Stebbins	
1959	Rawhide	Incident West of Lano	Emily Haley	Haley sisters show wagon breaks down
1959	Flight	Operation Angel	Lieutenant Walpole	Hadley plays WWII nurse on air evac flights (Note: Some later sources have this as 1958, but newspaper TV listings indicate its first broadcast was April 1959.)
1959	Alcoa Presents: One Step Beyond	The Captain's Guests	Ellen Courtney	Couple rent spooky old seaside house
1959	Rawhide	Incident of the Day of the Dead	Ellen Hadley	Hadley plays a bitter crippled rancher
1959	Men into Space	Building a Space Station	Phyllis Smith	
1959	Tightrope!	The Neon Wheel	Lucille Stevens	Crime witness (Hadley) forced to marry corrupt mayor
1960	Pony Express	The Golden Circle	Belle Terry	
1960	The Life and Legend of Wyatt Earp	The Confidence Man	Evie Marlowe	
1960	The Many Loves of Dobie Gillis	The Unregistered Nurse	Valerie Brown	Hadley plays a nurse
1960	Surfside 6	Deadly Male	Linda Howell	
1960	The Best of the Post	Suicide Flight	Louise	Hadley plays wife of jet test pilot
1960	The Tab Hunter Show	Happily Unmarried	Corina Manville	Hadley plays estranged wife of star's buddy
1961	Sugarfoot	Shepherd with a Gun	Mattie Peel	Ambitious rancher's daughter (Hadley) opposes Sugarfoot
1961	The Brothers Brannagan	Death Insurance	Angela	
1961	The Joey Bishop Show	On the Spot	Barbara Simpson	Hadley played girlfriend to star Joey Bishop until fired
1961	The Joey Bishop Show	Joey Meets Jack Paar	Barbara Simpson	
1961	The Joey Bishop Show	A Windfall for Mom	Barbara Simpson	
1961	The Joey Bishop Show	Help Wanted	Barbara Simpson	
1961	The Joey Bishop Show	Five Brides for Joey	Barbara Simpson	
1961	The Joey Bishop Show	Charity Begins at Home	Barbara Simpson	
1961	The Joey Bishop Show	Ring-a-Ding-Ding	Barbara Simpson	
1962	Alcoa Premiere	Of This Time, Of That Place	Mary Howe	Hadley plays professor's wife
1962	Bonanza	The Mountain Girl	Stephanie Harker	A small supporting role for Hadley
1963	Empire	Burnout	Ruth Barton	Hadley plays wife of forest ranger
1963	Grindl	The Great Schulz	Hilda Schulz	
1964	The Cara Williams Show	The Wedding Rehearsal	Diane	Hadley plays a bride who fights with her groom
1965	Mr. Novak	Mountains to Climb	Ann Stillman	
1965	Vacation Playhouse	Luke and the Tenderfoot	Miss Meacham	This was the unsold pilot she made back in 1955 (Note: This half-hour episode, "The Boston Kid", was combined with the second pilot episode for the same series, called "The John Wesley Hardin Story" to make up the one hour time slot for Vacation Playhouse in 1965.)
1966	Gomer Pyle, U.S.M.C.	Gomer and the Beast	Ginger	Hadley plays a waitress with an abusive boyfriend
1971	Owen Marshall, Counselor at Law	The Triangle	Mrs. Hurley	
1972	A Great American Tragedy	(TV Movie)	Trudy Stewart	
