= Paratroop Command =

1959 film by William Witney

- Film poster
- Directed by: William Witney
- Written by: Stanley Shpetner
- Produced by: Samuel Z. Arkoff; James H. Nicholson; Stanley Shpetner
- Starring: Richard Bakalyan; Ken Lynch
- Cinematography: Gilbert Warrenton
- Edited by: Robert S. Eisen
- Music by: Ronald Stein
- Distributed by: Santa Rosa Productions; American International Pictures
- Release date: February 1959 (U.S.)
- Running time: 71 min.
- Country: United States
- Language: English

Paratroop Command is a 1959 American war film directed by William Witney, starring Richard Bakalyan, Ken Lynch and Jack Hogan. American International Pictures originally released the film as a double feature with Submarine Seahawk.

== Plot ==
Charlie is a paratrooper that is mistaken for a coward by fellow soldier Ace because he lies still in an attempt to ambush a group of German soldiers. He then suffers the scorn of his unit because he accidentally kills his friend Cowboy, who was wearing a German uniform in an attempt to infiltrate enemy lines, and was apparently holding a gun on the rest of the squad. Ace, Cowboy's best friend, threatens him, and in subsequent action in Sicily, tries to kill him twice, but fails both times. In the subsequent landing in Salerno, Ace curses Charlie with his dying breath. Charlie is hanging from a tree in his parachute and carrying a vital generator, with both the Lieutenant and Sergeant wounded, and the rest of the squad dead, on the wrong side of a road that is mined. Following the Lieutenant's instructions, he clears the mines with hand grenades, but a dud grenade leaves him stranded and short of his destination. Sacrificing his life, he runs the final distance and explodes the remaining mine. The film is set in World War II in North Africa, Sicily, and Italy.

== Cast ==
As appearing in screen credits (main roles identified):

Actor	Role
Richard Bakalyan	Charlie
Ken Lynch	Lieutenant
Jack Hogan	"Ace" Mason
Jimmy Murphy	Sergeant
Jeff Morris	"Pigpen" (credited as Jeffrey Morris)
James Beck	"Cowboy" (credited as Jim Beck)
Carolyn Hughes	Gina
Patricia Huston	Amy, a WAC
Paul Busch	German Captain
Sydney Lassick	Interpreter (credited as Sid Lassick)
Brad Trumbull (credits as Trumball)	C-47 Pilot

A full cast and production crew list is too lengthy to include, see: IMDb profile.

== Reception ==
Quentin Tarantino, an admirer of Witney's work, considers this film to be among his four best. Tarantino called it "the best of American-International’s WW2 potboilers. But I think it’s even better than that. It contains a realism that sets it apart from most other WW2 movies done in that same era. So much so that it makes a lot of good and similar movies from that same time, Robert Aldrich’s Attack and Don Siegel’s Hell is for Heroes, look theatrical and stagey by comparison."
