= Wrangler (TV series) =

- Starring: Jason Evers
- Country of origin: United States
- No. of seasons: 1
- No. of episodes: 6

Production
- Running time: 30 minutes

Original release
- Network: NBC
- Release: August 4 – September 15, 1960

Wrangler is an American Western television series starring Jason Evers that aired on the NBC television network from August 4 to September 15, 1960.

In Wrangler, Evers played Pitcairn, a wrangler who roamed the Old West, finding adventures and helping people along the way. However, Wrangler did not have much of a chance to find adventure because the series lasted only for six episodes. It was a summer replacement series for The Ford Show Starring Tennessee Ernie Ford, but did not garner high enough ratings to become a full-fledged series.

This was the first time that Evers was a regular on a network TV series, and he was the only actor to appear in all episodes. Three years after Wrangler, Evers landed the lead in the 26-episode ABC drama Channing, set on a fictitious college campus.

Wrangler was the first TV series created by future Star Trek creator Gene Roddenberry.

Wrangler stood out among westerns chiefly because it was the first of its genre to be videotaped rather than filmed. It earned an Emmy nomination for Outstanding Achievement in Electronic Camerawork in 1961, but the innovative technique led to numerous production problems and delays at KTLA, where it was produced.

Guest stars included Tyler McVey in the episode "Incident at the Bar M," also known as "Episode at the Bar M." UCLA has preserved that and other episodes in its Film and Television Archive. Another guest star was Don Spruance.

== Episodes ==
No.	Title	Directed by	Written by	Original release date
1	"Episode at the Bar-M"	Unknown	Unknown	August 4, 1960
2	"A Time For Hanging"	Unknown	Unknown	August 11, 1960
3	"Affair at the Trading Post"	Unknown	Unknown	August 18, 1960
4	"The Affair With Browning's Woman"	Unknown	Unknown	August 25, 1960
5	"Incident At The Wide Loop"	Unknown	Unknown	September 1, 1960
6	"Encounter At Elephant Butte"	Unknown	Unknown	September 15, 1960
TBA	"A Crisis Named Wavelin"	TBA	TBA	TBA
TBA	"The Incident of the Magic Elixir"	TBA	TBA	TBA

== Bibliography ==
- McNeil, Alex. Total Television (1996). New York: Penguin Books ISBN 0-14-024916-8
- Tim Brooks and Earle Marsh, The Complete Directory to Prime Time Network and Cable TV Shows 1946–Present, Ninth edition (New York: Ballantine Books, 2007) ISBN 978-0-345-49773-4
