= Jason Evers =

American actor (1922-2005)

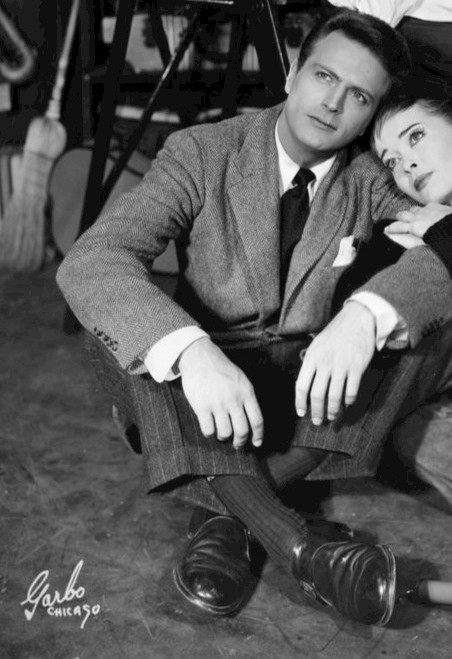
- Evers in the Broadway play Angel in the Pawnshop (1951)
- Born: Herb Evers or Herbert Everin; January 2, 1922; New York City, U.S.
- Died: March 13, 2005 (aged 83); Los Angeles, California, U.S.
- Other names: Herbert Evers; Herb Evers
- Occupation: Actor
- Years active: 1943–1990
- Spouses: Shirley Ballard (m. 1953; div. 1966) Diana James (m. 1974; div. 1975)

Jason Evers (born Herb Evers or Herbert Everin; January 2, 1922 – March 13, 2005) was an American actor. He was the star of the 1963 ABC television drama Channing.

== Early life ==
Evers was born either as Herbert Everberg or Herbert Everin in New York City; he attended DeWitt Clinton High School there. His parents' names are recorded as William Everin (1894–1972) and Hilda (Weiserbs) Everin (1902–1995) and he had a younger sister, Lucille (1929–2015). He was later known as Herbert Evers in New York.

After leaving high school early to join the U.S. Army, (Note: An article published in the July 15, 1960, issue of the Lake Charles American Press says, "Jason Evers left school ... preferring to give himself more time to see acting ..." It goes on to say that he joined the U.S. Army after acting in a Broadway production.) Evers was so inspired by stars such as John Wayne (with whom he would later appear in The Green Berets) that he decided to try acting.

== Career ==
Roles on Broadway led to Hollywood, where his first recurring role was on the 1960 NBC Western television series Wrangler. On June 30, 1960, Evers appeared on NBC's The Ford Show, Starring Tennessee Ernie Ford. He was cast for an episode of the ABC western series The Rebel ("Miz Purdy", 1961), appearing as George Tess. Evers made three guest appearances on Perry Mason, including the role of murder victim Stuart Benton in "The Case of the Difficult Detour" (1961), and defendant Roy Galen in "The Case of the Latent Lover" (1964). In "The Case of the Posthumous Painter" (also 1961), he played the defendant's brother.

In the 1963–64 season, Evers starred as 41-year-old Professor Jason Howe in the 26-episode ABC drama series Channing, based on life on a college campus. His most enduring role derived from the 1959 B-movie classic The Brain That Wouldn't Die, which was not released until 1962.

From 1967 to 1969, he appeared sporadically as James Sonnett, the missing son sought by the Walter Brennan character, Will Sonnett, in ABC's The Guns of Will Sonnett.

Evers and Kathie Browne featured in the 1968 Star Trek: The Original Series episode "Wink of an Eye". That same year, he also appeared in the films The Green Berets, P.J. and A Man Called Gannon, and also appeared in sci-fi films such as The Illustrated Man (1969) and Escape from the Planet of the Apes (1971).

Evers continued to appear in films and television, in such series as The Rockford Files, having guest-starred with Bruce Lee in the Green Hornet episode "Eat, Drink and be Dead" (1966), but they were of an increasingly minor nature. Evers also appeared as a race-car driver and a romantic interest of Doris Martin in The Doris Day Show in 1970. His later films included A Piece of the Action (1977), Claws (1977), and Barracuda (1978). His final film appearance was in 1990 in Basket Case 2.

== Personal life ==
On December 24, 1953, Evers married actress Shirley Ballard; they divorced in September 1966. In 1974, he married Diana James, and they divorced in May 1975.

== Death ==
Evers died of heart failure in Los Angeles on March 13, 2005, aged 83.

== Filmography ==
=== Film ===
Year	Title	Role	Notes
1943	Guadalcanal Diary	Minor Role	Uncredited
1944	Greenwich Village	Young Man	Uncredited
1944	Three Is a Family	Naval Officer	Uncredited
1960	Pretty Boy Floyd	Sheriff Blackie Faulkner	
1962	The Brain That Wouldn't Die	Dr. Bill Cortner	
1962	House of Women	Dr. F.M. Conrad	
1966	Dawn of Victory	Jesus	Short
1968	P.J.	Jason Grenoble	
1968	A Man Called Gannon	Mills	
1968	The Green Berets	Capt. Coleman	
1969	The Illustrated Man	Simmons	
1971	Escape from the Planet of the Apes	E-2	
1977	A Piece of the Action	Ty Shorter	
1977	Claws	Jason Monroe	
1979	Barracuda	Dr. Elliot Snow	
1985	The Stuff	Stuff Character	
1990	Basket Case 2	Lou the Editor	(final film role)

=== Television ===
Year	Title	Role	Notes
1949	NBC Presents		Episode: "Anything But Love"
1949	Kraft Television Theatre		Episode: "A Young Man's Fancy"
1949	Colgate Theatre		Episode: "Old Flame"
1949–1950	The Philco Television Playhouse	Paris	2 episodes
1950	Believe It or Not!		Episode: "Murder in Diamonds"
1951	Studio One	Scott Magruder	2 episodes
1951	Armstrong Circle Theatre		Episode: "Day Dreams"
1955	Omnibus	Paris	Episode: "Iliad"
1955–1959	The Phil Silvers Show	Lieutenant / Interviewer / Capt. Kyler / Lt. Kissel	9 episodes
1959	True Story	Clifford Lowe	Episode dated 10 October 1959
1959	New York Confidential	Honig	Episode: "Crossed Eyed Camera"
1959	Deadline	Larry	Episode: "Suspicion of Murder"
1960	Wrangler	Pitcairn	6 episodes
1960–1961	Cheyenne	Andy Clark / Carl Tower	2 episodes
1961	Hong Kong	Bradley Gardner	Episode: "Suitable for Framing"
1961	The Rebel	George Tess	Episode: "Miz Purdy"
1961	Lawman	Shag Warner	Episode: "Blind Hate"
1961	Surfside 6	Don Canfield	Episode: "Count Seven!"
1961	77 Sunset Strip	Waco Tate	Episode: "The Desert Spa Caper"
1961	Bronco	Henry Riley	Episode: "Prince of Darkness"
1961	Tallahassee 7000	Ed Morse	Episode: "Man Bait"
1961–1962	Laramie	Hank Emory / Carl Sanford / Hanson	3 episodes
1961–1964	Perry Mason	Roy Galen / Clint Robert Miller / Stuart Benton	3 episodes Episode: "The Case of the Latent Lover" / Episode: "The Case of the Posthumous Painter" / Episode: "The Case of the Difficult Detour"
1961–1967	Bonanza	Tom Blackwell / J.D. Lambert	2 episodes
1962	Bus Stop	Tony Stratton	Episode: "Cry to Heaven"
1962	Adventures in Paradise	Rick Leyton	Episode: "Please Believe Me"
1962	Tales of Wells Fargo	Tom Kelly	Episode: "Remember the Yazoo"
1962	Frontier Circus	Judd Halleck	Episode: "The Good Fight"
1962	The Defenders	Steve Janos	Episode: "The Bigamist"
1962–1963	Alcoa Premiere	Professor Joseph Howe	2 episodes
1962–1964	Gunsmoke	Charlie Ross / Collie / Ben Harden	3 episodes
1963–1964	Channing	Professor Joseph Howe	26 episodes
1965	Branded	Father Jason Durant	Episode: "The Test"
1965	Death Valley Days	Dan Hardy	Episode: "Birthright"
1965–1966	The F.B.I.	Captain Thomas / Allen Bennett	2 episodes
1965–1968	The Big Valley	George Akers / Colter	2 episodes
1966	T.H.E. Cat	Father Francis Langland	Episode: "To Kill a Priest"
1966	The Virginian	Sheriff Harry Lundy	Episode: "An Echo of Thunder"
1966	The Green Hornet	Dirk	Episode: "Eat, Drink, and Be Dead"
1966	Combat!	Pvt. Jim Culley	Episode: "The Outsider"
1967	The Road West	Divvy Peters	Episode: "The Insider"
1967	The Invaders	Maj. Dan Keller	Episode: "Condition: Red"
1967	Three for Danger	Kirk	Television film
1967	Tarzan	Ramon	2 episodes
1967	Run for Your Life	Garret Hamilton	Episode: "Fly by Night"
1967–1968	Felony Squad	William Reardon / Eliot Rogers	2 episodes
1967–1968	The Wild Wild West	Commander Beech / Christopher Kohner	2 episodes
1967–1969	The Guns of Will Sonnett	James 'Jim' Sonnett	13 episodes
1968	Judd, for the Defense	Alec Spinner	Episode: "No Law Against Murder"
1968	Star Trek	Rael	S3:E11, "Wink of an Eye"
1968	It Takes a Thief	Aubrey Lathum	Episode: "Glass Riddle"
1968–1973	Mannix	Dana Royal / Josh Martin / Ross / Charles Egan / Assassin	5 episodes
1969	The Mod Squad	Sheriff	Episode: "The Uptight Town"
1969	The Bold Ones: The New Doctors	Dr. Ralph Simpson	Episode: "What's the Price of a Pair of Eyes?"
1969	The Young Lawyers	Michael Cannon	Episode: "The Young Lawyers"
1969–1973	Mission: Impossible	Colonel Oleg Kemmer/Ben Nelson / Carl Deetrich / Ray Dunson / Walter Townsend	4 episodes Episode: "The Question" / Episode: "Blind" / Episode: "Double Circle" / Episode: "The Mind of Stefan Miklos"
1969–1979	Hawaii Five-O	Lieutenant Dexter / Wallis / Charles Irwin	3 episodes Episode" "Good Help Is Hard to Find" / Episode: "Cloth of Gold" / Episode: "All the King's Horses"
1970	The Doris Day Show	David Cowley	Episode: "The Feminist"
1970	Medical Center	Ken Palmer	Episode: "Scream of Silence"
1970–1975	Marcus Welby, M.D.	Dick Shearer	2 episodes
1971	Dan August	Walter Boyd	Episode: "Circle of Lies"
1971–1974	Cannon	Hollinger / Lt. Jim Farragut / Edgar Bruce / Art Miller	4 episodes
1973	Banacek	Roger Sloan	Episode: "The Two Million Clams of Cap'n Jack"
1973	Owen Marshall, Counselor at Law	Barrington	Episode: "Once a Lion"
1973	The Rookies	Ben Tabnor	Episode: "Sound of Silence"
1973–1976	The Streets of San Francisco	Ben Rush / Johnny Harmon	2 episodes Episode: "Underground" / Episode: "The Set-Up"
1974	The Wide World of Mystery	Martin Forester	Episode: "Shadow of Fear"
1974	Ironside	Ted Kelly	Episode: "Class of '40"
1974	Police Story	Sergeant Arnold	Episode: "Country Boy"
1974	Hec Ramsey	Pete Jonas	Episode: "Scar Tissue"
1974	Fer-de-Lance	Commander Kirk	Television film
1974	The Manhunter		Episode: "The Doomsday Gang"
1974	Kodiak	Darcy	Episode: "The Hunters"
1974–1976	Barnaby Jones	Herb Dorset / Gil Turner	2 episodes
1975	Caribe	Ed Robbins	Episode: "Vanished"
1975	Matt Helm	Alan Grant	Episode: "Scavenger's Paradise"
1976	Switch	Capt. Topping	Episode: "Come Die with Me"
1976	McMillan & Wife	Roland Merrill	Episode: "All Bets Off"
1977	The Fantastic Journey	Atar	2 episodes
1977	Most Wanted	Duncan Taylor	Episode: "The Insider"
1977	Quincy, M.E.	Dr. Peter James	Episode: "Valleyview"
1977	The Bionic Woman	Radnik	Episode: "Rodeo"
1977–1978	The Rockford Files	Brad Davies / Paul Silvan	2 episodes
1978	Charlie's Angels	Larry Fallon	Episode: "The Sandcastle Murders"
1978	Emergency!	Justin Manning	Episode: "Survival on Charter #220"
1978	Happy Days	H.R. Buchanan	3 episodes
1978	CHiPs	Fred Gesslin	Episode: "Supercycle"
1979	The Runaways	Randolph	Episode: "Screams in the Night"
1980	Vegas	Lloyd Kohler	Episode: "A Deadly Victim"
1981	Hart to Hart	Harrison	Episode: "Ex-Wives Can Be Murder"
1981	Fantasy Island	Ben	Episode: "Chorus Girl/Surrogate Father"
1981	Golden Gate	Harry Stillwell	Television film
1982–1983	The Fall Guy	Frank Forester / Gordon	2 episodes
1982–1984	Knight Rider	Edward Grant / Herb Bremen	2 episodes
1983	Small & Frye	Mr. Ackly	Episode: "Endangered Detectives"
1984	T. J. Hooker	Warren Avery	Episode: "Hot Property"
1984	Glitter	David	Episode: "Pilot"
1984	Scarecrow and Mrs. King	Jerry Perrine	Episode: "Charity Begins at Home"
1985	The Dukes of Hazzard	Larson	Episode: "The Haunting of J.D. Hogg"
1985	Murder, She Wrote	Dr. Marshall MacGill	Episode: "My Johnny Lies Over the Ocean"
1986	The A-Team	Bart Taggart	Episode: "Mission of Peace"
1987	Matlock	Dr. Jim Lord	Episode: "The Gift"
