= Patricia Huston =

American actress

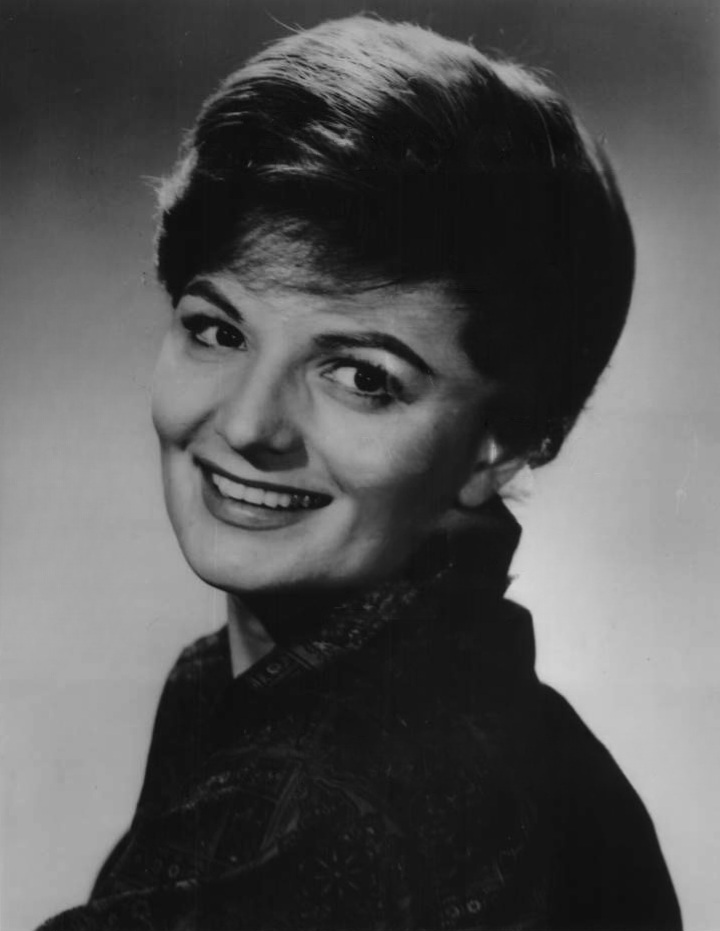
- Huston in 1961
- Born: Patricia Lou Baker; August 10, 1929; Mount Vernon, New York, U.S.
- Died: September 25, 1995 (aged 66); San Pedro, California, U.S.
- Other name: Patt Huston
- Education: University of Arizona
- Occupation: Actress
- Years active: 1958–1995
- Spouse: John D. Brinkley (m. 1962; div. 1984)
- Children: 1

Patricia Huston (August 10, 1929 – September 25, 1995) was an American stage, film, and television actress. She had a notable acting career from 1958 to 1968, went through a seventeen-year period without any acting work, and resumed her career with several recurring roles on popular shows during the last ten years of her life.

== Early life ==
She was born Patricia Lou Baker in Mount Vernon, New York. Her parents were Charles G. Baker and Margie A. Winingar. According to a 1963 newspaper item, she had two sisters. She obtained her first Social Security card in November 1943 under the name Pat Lou Baker; from the number assigned it appears she was living in Illinois at the time. According to later interviews, she grew up in Chicago, where she acted in school plays, attended Northwestern University for a year, then studied dramatics and graduated cum laude from the University of Arizona with a BFA (Fine Arts) degree. In June 1956 the name on her Social Security Administration file changed to "Pat Baker Huston".

== First decade: 1958–1968 ==
=== Career beginnings ===
The earliest records of her as a professional actress come from Los Angeles during spring 1958. She played in a stage version of Inherit the Wind, made her first film, The Bonnie Parker Story for AIP, and did her first television work, two episodes of Studio One, all within a three-month span.

By the end of 1958, she had completed filming on Paratroop Command, her second movie for director William Witney and AIP; done two more television episodes; had attracted the attention of Lucille Ball who signed her to a contract with Desilu Productions; and was in the midst of a highly successful six week run for the play Children of Darkness.

=== Desilu workshop ===
Columnists noted that Lucille Ball was prominently in attendance at the opening nights of Huston's early plays. Her "Little Red Schoolhouse" at the Desilu Workshop was training eight contract players, including Huston, in the finer points of stagecraft and television work. Desilu's patronage was also responsible for Huston obtaining so many television roles in her first years of performing.

In 1959, Huston took on another stage role in Compulsion after the original actress dropped out during dress rehearsals.

In the summer of 1959, she co-starred with Barry Sullivan in the two-person play, Two for the Seesaw at the La Jolla Playhouse. Her performance was critically acclaimed. Throughout 1959, Huston appeared as guest star in ten television shows.

=== 1960 ===
In February 1960, Huston appeared in an original play, Music in the Distance, by drama critic Patterson Greene, performed at the Circle Theater in Hollywood along with co-stars William Phipps, Kathie Browne, and Mark Herron. The production received lukewarm reviews and closed early.

Huston appeared primarily on CBS television shows because of their connections with Desilu. She appeared in the CBS anthology soap opera For Better Or Worse for several months before its cancellation.

Huston hoped to regain some career momentum by agreeing to reprise her success in Two for the Seesaw with Hugh O'Brian for a five-week tour. However, both actors received criticism for their first performance at the Highland Park Tent Theater. The Chicago Tribune's critic blamed Huston "playing the extroverted floozy with all the pseudo-Bancroft stops out". (Note: The reference is to Anne Bancroft's award-winning performance in the Broadway original) To counter the negative review from the Chicago Tribune, they took out trade paper ads listing their good reviews, illustrated with cartoons drawn by Huston of them on a seesaw. Later, the pair received more positive reviews as the production moved to the Drury Lane Theatre and Lobero Theatre. In 1961, She was nominated for the Sarah Siddons Award for Two for the Seesaw, but lost to Gertrude Berg.

=== Post-Desilu ===
By 1961, Desilu discontinued their relationship with Huston and was represented by the Sanford Camora Agency. Her television appearances were halved from her Desilu tenure due to an extended stage commitment, and the shows themselves were mainly short-lived sitcoms or syndicated programs. (Note: The exception was the hour-long CBS series Checkmate.) She was also cast in a campy women's prison film for Warner Brothers originally titled Ladies of the Mob, but which was released in 1962 as House of Women.

Huston's main professional satisfactions in 1961 came from stage work. She was prominent in the West Coast premiere of The Balcony at the LA Civic Playhouse. The production starred Maxine Stuart, Adam Williams, and Huston, with Josip Elic, Arthur Malet, Tom Costello, and Derva Korwin in feature roles. Huston's performance as a sex worker named Carmen drew high praise from the LA critics, with the production running for four months.

Columnist Mike Connolly suggested that Huston had lost the lead in a new TV series because her agent Sandy Camora had asked for too much money. Soon after, Huston switched her representation to General Artists Corporation.

January 1962 saw Huston receive top billing for an English language revival of The Dybbuk at the Pasadena Playhouse than ran for three weeks. She received positive reviews playing the central role of "Leah", with the other leads being Richard Hale, John D. Brinkley, and Michael Fox.

=== Career decline ===
After 1962, Huston took on progressively fewer acting roles. Her television work lessened each year until late 1965, when she snagged a recurring role on the new soap opera Days of Our Lives. She originated the role of Addie Olson, the mother of rebellious teenager Julie Olson played by Charla Doherty. Huston had a small part in the film Synanon (1965), her last for thirty years.

Huston's first stage work in three years (and her last for the next twenty) took place in August 1965, in a San Francisco production of the LeRoi Jones play Dutchman. The play starred Paul Winfield and Huston (replacing Sheree North from the Los Angeles run), with Burgess Meredith directing. It was presented on a double bill with The Toilet, a shorter drama with a different cast. Both plays were held over for a total of five weeks.

== Hiatus: 1968–1985 ==
After a 1968 television guest appearance, Huston paused her acting career for 17 years. Huston stated in an interview in the mid-1980s that she spent this hiatus primarily raising her son and working part-time jobs, at one point going on welfare. A program for welfare recipients led to Huston securing a job as a phone operator at an institution, where she eventually became an administrator.

== Career revival: 1985–1995 ==
According to Huston, her career stage revival occurred when her mother visited Los Angeles. Director Edward Ludlum ran into her and asked how Huston was doing. Ludlum persuaded Huston to attend a theater class he was leading then gradually involved her in teaching, directing, and performing in local stage productions.

Huston resumed acting on television in 1985 with small roles in Cheers and Gimme a Break!. In 1986, she played guest characters on General Hospital, Days of Our Lives, L.A. Law. She returned to Days of Our Lives in 1989 to play her third role in the series. Her last appeared on television in 1992.

Huston died on September 25, 1995, in San Pedro, California, from lung cancer. She was 66 years old. She was cremated and her ashes deposited at sea. Her last performance, a minor bit as a nun for the film Heaven's Prisoners, was released nine months later.

== Personal life ==
As a young actress, Huston identified as "beat", wrote poetry, played the bongos, had an all purple bathroom, and referred to herself as a "serious kook". She was slow to realize her growing fame; when her pet schnauzer went astray, she took out a "Lost" ad in a Hollywood area newspaper using her own name and phone number.

Before her marriage, gossip columns linked her most closely with another ex-Chicagoan, John Vivyan. The couple, both Democrats, performed at a fundraising rally of "Citizens for Kennedy" in September 1960.

At first rehearsal for The Dybbuk in January 1962, Huston met her co-star John D. Brinkley, who was from Chicago and two years younger than she was. They announced their engagement in early February and said they would marry on Valentine's Day of 1962. However, columnist Mike Connolly reported their astrologer advised a later date so they postponed the ceremony until February 23. The couple had one child, a son born in May 1963. They divorced in November 1984.

== Stage performances ==
Listed by year of first performance
Year	Play	Role	Venue	Notes
1958	Inherit the Wind	Rachel Brown	Gallery Theater (Los Angeles)	Four week production with Wendell Holmes, Maurice Manson, and Ted Knight
1958	Children of Darkness	Laetitia Snap	Stage Society Theater (Note: Located at 9014 Melrose Avenue, West Hollywood)	Revival of a 1930 Broadway play described as an "evil comedy" ran six weeks
1959	Compulsion	Ruth Slimovitsky	Omnibus Center Theater	Play starred Donald Buka, Ray Stricklyn, and Ted Knight
1959	Two for the Seesaw	Gittel Mosca	La Jolla Playhouse	Barry Sullivan and Huston starred in summer stock
1960	Music in the Distance	Leni	Circle Theater	Original production starred Huston, William Phipps, Kathie Browne, and Mark Herron
1960	Two for the Seesaw	Gittel Mosca	Highland Park Theatre; Drury Lane Theatre; Lobero Theatre	Hugh O'Brian dominated the billing in a five-week tour with Huston
1961	The Balcony	Carmen	LA Civic Playhouse (Note: Located at 755 N. La Cienega Blvd, a few blocks south of the Sunset Strip)	Four month run produced rave reviews for Huston
1962	The Dybbuk	Leah	Pasadena Playhouse	Morris Ankrum directed this production
1965	Dutchman	Lula	Marines' Theater	Huston co-starred with Paul Winfield for five week run
1985	In the Sweet Bye and Bye		Back Alley Theatre (Note: Located at 15231 Burbank Blvd, Van Nuys)	Rue McClanahan and Huston alternated playing female lead on weekends

== Filmography ==
Film (by year of first release)
Year	Title	Role	Notes
1958	The Bonnie Parker Story	Chuck's Girl	Credited as Patt Huston
1959	Paratroop Command	Amy	Huston portrayed an Army WAC who restores a paratroopers confidence
1962	Experiment in Terror	Nancy Ashton	Filmed in October 1961; Huston is killed early on by Ross Martin
1962	House of Women	Doris Jones	Filmed in May–June 1961, the working title was Ladies of the Mob.
1965	Synanon	Clara	
1996	Heaven's Prisoners	Older Nun	Filmed in summer 1995, but not released until 1996.

Television (in original broadcast order) 1958–1968
Year	Series	Episode	Role	Notes
1958	Studio One	The Desperate Age	Priscilla Olson	
1958	Studio One	The Enemy Within	Mrs Brooks	Huston plays wife of USAF Major (Dane Clark) taking survival test
1958	M Squad	Force of Habit	Mary Pulaski	
1958	Mike Hammer	The Living Dead	Susan Barlow	
1959	Mike Hammer	Accentuate the Negative	Mary Otto	
1959	Wagon Train	The Old Man Charvanaugh Story	Mother	Huston plays mother with two children bushwhacked by outlaws
1959	Gunsmoke	Sky	Woman	A "doubleheader", she was on CBS the same night (February 14) she was on NBC (above)
1959	Desilu Playhouse	The Comeback		
1959	Behind Closed Doors	Assignment Prague	Smolenskaya	
1959	M Squad	The Platter Pirates	Julie Ferrell	Huston plays secretary to murdered DJ
1959	Perry Mason	Case of the Golden Fraud	Doris Petrie	
1959	Hawaiian Eye	The Quick Return	Alma Jackson	
1959	Richard Diamond, Private Detective	Marked for Murder	Myra Cantrell	Huston plays a Lonely Hearts Club blackmailer
1959	Mike Hammer	Jury of One	Phyllis Tyler	
1960	Law of the Plainsman	The Matriarch	Greta Lane	
1960	The DuPont Show with June Allyson	Piano Man	Julie Skylar	Vic Damone's dramatic debut with Huston as his wife
1960	For Better or Worse	The Case of Don and Louise (Note: This storyline had 25 episodes, broadcast Monday-Friday starting March 1st, 1960. The show was taped one week in advance of broadcasting.)	Louise	Huston plays well-heeled wife whose exec husband can't provide enough
1960	Tales of Wells Fargo	The Outlaw's Wife	Marge Walker	
1960	Bachelor Father	The Very Friendly Witness	Elena del Castillo	Client (Huston) romances attorney in lawsuit
1960	Mr. Garlund	The Towers	Serphina	Marko (Jay Novello) and his daughter (Huston) lose an inheritance
1960	Harrigan and Son	A Matter of Dignity	Jan Duprez	Huston's portrait of hobo (John Carradine) upsets him
1960	Hennesey	Come Home, Dr. Rogers	Dorothy Rogers	Husband in private practice contemplates re-enlisting
1960	Perry Mason	Case of the Larcenous Lady	Mona Henderson	Politician's wife gets knocked off for chicanery
1960	The Cheyenne Show	Savage Breed	Nora Kenton	Lawman (Ray Danton) ignores girl friend (Huston) over card game
1961	Michael Shayne, Private Detective	Final Settlement	Trina DeWitt	Novelist (Huston) accidentally kills hubby (William Bryant)
1961	Bringing Up Buddy	Poppa's Picture	Joan Thomas	Buddy (Frank Aletter) meets museum director (Huston)
1961	The Barbara Stanwyck Show	Big Jake		
1961	Checkmate	Portrait of a Man Running	Anne Winthrop	
1961	Shotgun Slade	The Phantom Noose	Marguerite Beck	
1962	The Detectives	The Outsider	Mrs. Foster	Huston plays a widowed mom with an ex-con brother-in-law (Dabbs Greer).
1962	General Electric Theater	My Dark Days – Prelude	Patricia Blandford	Part 1 of 2
1962	General Electric Theater	My Dark Days – Aftermath	Patricia Blandford	Part 2 of 2
1962	Perry Mason	The Case of the Ancient Romeo	Claire Adams	An actress (Huston) is allowed to "buy" the role of Juliet
1962	Dr. Kildare	The Visitors	Marie Hackett	
1962	Ben Casey	In the Name of Love, a Small Corruption	Elaine	Huston plays a modern Regan to Rod Steiger's King Lear
1963	Death Valley Days	Bloodline (Note: Some sources say first broadcast was Dec 1962, but no newspaper listing earlier than Jan 1963 has yet been found)	Anne Knight	Huston plays a nurse
1963	The Dakotas	Thunder in Pleasant Valley	Kate McNeil	Huston plays the kidnapped daughter of a rancher (Karl Swenson)
1963	Sam Benedict	Image of a Toad	Mildred Hunter	
1964	Rawhide	Incident at Zebulon	Luanna Day	
1964	Perry Mason	The Case of the Tragic Trophy	Lydia Lawrence	Secretary to murdered producer is Huston's role
1964	Death Valley Days	A Kingdom for a Horse	Fern Mitchell	Huston locks Emperor of Brazil (Gilbert Roland) in a barn in the Old West
1964	Daniel Boone	The Prophet (Note: Listed as first shown in 1965 on some sources, but many parts of the country saw it in late Dec 1964)	Amanda Dobson	Settler's wife (Huston) hears of impending attack
1965	Death Valley Days	The Streets of El Paso	Marie Blanchard	Huston plays conniving saloon owner
1965	Days of Our Lives	(7 episodes)	Addie Olson	Huston played mother to rebellious teen Julie Olson (Charla Doherty)
1966	Days of Our Lives	(1966-01-16)	Addie Olson	
1966	Days of Our Lives	(1966-03-09)	Addie Olson	Huston's character moved away to Europe in this episode
1966	The Wild Wild West	The Night of the Ready-Made Corpse	Leda Pellargo	Huston plays wife of assassinated dictator
1966	Jericho	Jackal of Diamonds	Dr. Barbier	
1967	Death Valley Days	The Day They Stole the Salamander	Belle Monteverdi	Huston must choose between her brother and the law
1968	Death Valley Days	The Saga of Sadie Orchard	Sadie Orchard	When her husband is injured, Huston drives the stagecoach

Television (in original broadcast order) 1985–1992
Year	Series	Episode	Role	Notes
1985	Cheers	Birth, Death, Love and Rice	Sister Catherine	
1985	Gimme a Break!	Katie's Apartment		
1986	Hill Street Blues	Scales of Justice	Sister	
1986	General Hospital	(1986-01-30)	Sarah	
1986	General Hospital	(1986-02-14)	Sarah	
1986	General Hospital	(1986-02-17)	Sarah	
1986	General Hospital	(1986-02-18)	Sarah	
1986	General Hospital	(1986-04-11)	Sarah	
1986	General Hospital	(1986-05-09)	Sarah	
1986	General Hospital	(1986-06-03)	Sarah	
1986	L.A. Law	(Pilot)	Hilda Brunschwager	
1986	L.A. Law	Those Lips, That Eye	Hilda Brunschwager	
1986	L.A. Law	The House of the Rising Flan	Hilda Brunschwager	
1986	L.A. Law	The Princess and the Wiener King	Hilda Brunschwager	
1986	L.A. Law	Simian Enchanted Evening	Hilda Brunschwager	
1986	L.A. Law	Raiders of the Lost Bark	Hilda Brunschwager	
1986	Days of Our Lives	(1986-11-13)	Helga	
1986	Days of Our Lives	(1986-11-17)	Helga	
1986	Days of Our Lives	(1986-11-19)	Helga	
1986	Days of Our Lives	(1986-12-01)	Helga	
1987	L.A. Law	December Bribe	Hilda Brunschwager	
1987	General Hospital	(1987-02-04)	Sarah	
1987	General Hospital	(1987-02-06)	Sarah	
1987	General Hospital	(1987-02-09)	Sarah	
1987	General Hospital	(1987-02-11)	Sarah	
1987	General Hospital	(1987-02-13)	Sarah	
1987	General Hospital	(1987-02-16)	Sarah	
1987	General Hospital	(1987-02-17)	Sarah	
1987	L.A. Law	The Grace of Wrath	Hilda Brunschwager	
1987	L.A. Law	Sparky Brackman RIP ????-1987	Hilda Brunschwager	
1987	Deadly Care	(TV Movie)	Marsha Foland	
1987	I Married Dora	I Married Dora		
1987	The Law and Harry McGraw	Angela's Secret	Mrs. Bishop	
1987	L.A. Law	Divorce with Extreme Prejudice	Hilda Brunschwager	
1988	L.A. Law	The Bald Ones	Hilda Brunschwager	
1988	Knots Landing	Suicidal	Admissions Person	
1988	Days of Our Lives	(1988-04-05)	Mrs. Whitmore	
1989	Days of Our Lives	(1989-03-28)	Gladys Christy	This was Huston's third recurring character on this series since 1965
1989	Days of Our Lives	(1989-03-30)	Gladys Christy	
1989	Days of Our Lives	(1989-03-31)	Gladys Christy	
1989	Days of Our Lives	(1989-04-07)	Gladys Christy	
1989	Days of Our Lives	(1989-04-12)	Gladys Christy	
1989	Days of Our Lives	(1989-04-26)	Gladys Christy	
1991	Murder, She Wrote	From the Horse's Mouth	Edie	
1991	The Antagonists	Variations on a Theme	Esther	
1991	Marilyn and Me	(TV Movie)	Aunt Ana	
1992	Columbo	No Time to Die	Louise Hays	
