= Tustin Playbox =

Defunct community theatre company based in Tustin

- Formation: 1952
- Dissolved: 1960
- Type: Theatre group
- Purpose: Community Theatre
- Location: Tustin, California
- Notable members: Ray Aghayan; Kathie Browne; Zeev Buffman; Tony Carbone; Robert Cornthwaite; Nancy Hadley; Werner Klemperer; Robert McQueeney; Sherwood Price; Joseph Sargent; William Schallert; Brad Trumbull; Robert Vaughn; Bobs Watson

Tustin Playbox was a community theatre company based in Tustin, California that drew upon local amateurs and Hollywood professionals. Founded in 1952, the group presented different productions each summer season. From 1955 on it proved financially successful and helped launch the screen careers of several performers, before abruptly closing in July 1960.

== Origin ==
Prior to 1952, there were only two theatre groups operating along the coast south of Los Angeles, the area covered by Orange and San Diego counties: the Laguna Beach Playhouse, founded in 1920, which had a dedicated building for its venue; and the now famous La Jolla Playhouse, founded in 1947, which used the auditorium of La Jolla High School for its productions through the early 1960s. The burgeoning growth in this area after 1945 convinced one local resident that there was a potential audience for a third theatre group.

May Rose Borum founded the Tustin Playbox in June 1952. She was a former Tustin High School English and Drama teacher, who had gone on to teach Drama at Los Angeles City College (LACC). She had prior associations with professional stage productions in the Los Angeles area, but was not herself a performer.

Borum convinced the Tustin Elementary School District to allow her to use the then new auditorium building at the Tustin Grammar School for staging plays in the summer when the school was closed. (The former Grammar School Auditorium building, at 300 South C Street, was converted to the Tustin Unified School District Administration Center in 1961–1962). The contract approved by the district charged $25 weekly rental and placed restrictions on what facilities could be used at the school.

Because the auditorium building was small and doubled as a gymnasium, there was no raised stage or proscenium. Productions would have to be mounted using center staging, more often called "Theatre in the round". The adjacent Home Economics room served as the makeup and dressing area. A sixteen year old volunteer, Steve Atherton, designed and built a lighting system and served as the electrician for the troupe. Another volunteer, Nancy Christensen, provided accompaniment on a small organ for the occasional musical.

== First two seasons ==
Borum brought two of her LACC drama students along for the first season. Ray Aghayan, an established designer-director for small theaters, would fulfill the same roles in Tustin. Jacquelyn Sue Browne, who had won an LACC award for Best Actress, would play female leads under the stage name "Cathy Browne" (which she later changed to "Kathie Browne").

Plays were presented Tuesday through Saturday evenings, with a two-week run for each play. The plays were all stock work from recent decades; no original productions were mounted the first two years. Only three already notable actors appeared in the first two seasons: Bobs Watson, Tony Carbone, and Beverly Long. A few younger performers would later become well known in other mediums: Cathy Browne, Zeev Buffman, and Sherwood Price. The rest of the casts those first two seasons were local amateurs.

Browne was very popular with the Tustin audience, playing one of the female leads in nearly every production those first two seasons. Price, who had a touring company background, was brought on for the second season and proved popular with both the audience and Browne. (Note: Price's birth name was Frank Sherwood Gell; his early credits from 1948 were as Sherwood Gell, eventually changing to Sherwood Price in 1952.) Browne and Price announced their engagement at the close of the second season, marrying in November 1953.

== Leadership change ==
Borum turned over the producer role to newlyweds Browne and Price during spring 1954, as she had a commitment to produce a play at the Ivar Theatre in Hollywood that summer. She took designer/director Ray Aghayan with her (they were married from 1955 to 1971). The new producers were granted a two-year lease, which in August 1955 was renewed as a three-year lease.

Browne and Price expanded the number of plays performed each season from four to five, retaining the two week run of each. They also instituted a series of five original children's plays, written by Sadie Hurwitz, to be performed on Saturday afternoons, which would also change every other week. From previous experience Price knew these matinees were moneymakers, at a time when less than half of American homes owned television sets. Local amateurs and drama school apprentices provided the cast for the matinees, while by 1956 leads for the evening productions were all professional actors. This had its drawbacks; the producers could not afford to hire understudies. When the star of one 1956 play was delayed on a television set in Burbank, the audience chose to wait two hours rather than accept their admission charge back.

The producers also experimented with winter matinees for children and a winter play for families put on at the Tustin High School auditorium. Another innovation was a Sunday night revival of Victorian theatre, with a melodrama and musical variety acts. They also presented the only original evening production ever done at the Playbox, a musical revue called Line Up the Girls!, written by locals Bob Bowers and Sadie Hurwitz.

== Community involvement ==
The Tustin Playbox depended on community support in the form of volunteers, who handled the technical aspects of productions, and sponsors, who arranged summer housing for visiting actors and used their influence to ensure the school district remained amenable to renting its facilities.

The most vital local support for the Tustin Playbox came from the owners of The Tustin News, William and Lucille Moses. Their weekly newspaper provided coverage for all of the producer's forthcoming plans and actual productions, and in later seasons Lucille Moses would provide reviews under her own byline. The paper also gave space to covering the growing screen careers of Browne and Price.

A number of Tustin residents formed the Tustin Playbox Association with two primary aims: to find or build a nearby permanent venue for the performing company, and to sponsor year-round performances. The producers encouraged this effort, but neither aim was ever achieved.

== Growth ==
With each new season, the reputation of the Tustin Playbox grew, bringing in full houses. Tustin lay near existing road, rail, and bus networks, allowing easy access for actors coming from Hollywood and audiences from all directions. Its nearest competitor, the Laguna Beach Playhouse, had suffered a mid-season breakdown in 1955 when its production company dissolved, and was off to a late start for the 1956 season.

As actors, Browne and Price began receiving parts in television shows and films from producers who had seen their performances. As producers, they were recruited by the Laguna Beach community to also take over the Playhouse, which they agreed to do for the 1957 season only.

The Playbox benefited from drawing quality stage directors, including William Schallert, Robert Cornthwaite, and Joseph Sargent. Price's best friend, upcoming actor Robert Vaughn, also lent a hand at directing. Actress Nancy Hadley had received a significant boost to her television work after appearing in several plays at Tustin during the 1954 season.

== Later seasons ==
Standing room only crowds at many Tustin productions drove Price to negotiate with the school district to begin using the much larger auditorium of Tustin High School for the eighth season (1959). This had a raised stage, curtains, lighting, and backstage areas, enabling the company to abandon center staging. The school district also wanted to repurpose the now outdated Tustin Grammar School. The district's student population had increased tenfold since 1952 and new elementary schools had been built; the small Grammar School would soon be converted to a year-round administration center.

Another change for this season was the near disappearance of Cathy Browne from performances and production credits. She did only two plays that summer, under her new billing of "Kathie Browne", while advertisements now read "Sherwood Price Productions". The Playbox also offered a sixth play this year, an end-of-season performance of Gigi starring Browne and Robert Vaughn, who also directed it.

For the ninth season (1960), Price split his efforts between the Tustin Playbox and a new venue in Fullerton, California. The "Fullerton Music Playhouse" would present Broadway musicals with full sets, props, and costumes. Price hired Werner Klemperer to direct the five plays planned for Tustin, and Joseph Sargent to stage the five musicals in Fullerton. That spring, all three men held a round table discussion with a local social club on current theater trends. Price also hired a general manager for each location.

== Closing ==
The end came unexpectedly for the Tustin Playbox. On Saturday, July 9, 1960, Orange County Deputy Sheriffs attached the Tustin Playbox as part of a larger lawsuit against Sherwood Price Productions. While the Playbox itself was financially solvent, Price had overextended his resources by opening the Fullerton Music Playhouse. Instead of creating a separate production company for the new venture, he had included it with the existing Tustin Playbox business organization. Creditors complained of overdue payments for the Fullerton business, and both venues were shut down as a result.

== Stage productions ==
Listed by year of first performance, excluding children's matinees
Year	Play	Director	Producer	Leads
1952	The Imaginary Invalid	Ray Aghayan	May Rose Borum	Bobs Watson, Beverly Long, Cathy Browne, Pamela Payton, Zeev Buffman
1952	See How They Run	Ray Aghayan	May Rose Borum	Bobs Watson, Cathy Browne, Pamela Payton, Edward Tornow, Zeev Buffman
1952	Candida	Ray Aghayan	May Rose Borum	Cathy Browne, Bobs Watson, Pamela Payton, John Nelson, Max Slaten, Kenneth Morgan
1952	Light Up the Sky	Ray Aghayan	May Rose Borum	Pamela Payton, Bobs Watson, Cathy Browne, Ray Aghayan, Kenneth Morgan, Wilmot I. Stewart, Jan Olson
1953	Lady in the Dark	Ray Aghayan	May Rose Borum	Barbara Lee Cook, Tony Carbone, Paul White, Max Slaten, Cathy Browne, Zeev Buffman, Sherwood Price
1953	Miranda	Ray Aghayan	May Rose Borum	Cathy Browne, Sherwood Price, Roberta Foster, Wilmot I. Stewart, Joy Campbell
1953	Caesar and Cleopatra	Ray Aghayan	May Rose Borum	Tony Carbone, Cathy Browne, Wilmot I. Stewart, Max Slaten, Sherwood Price, Jack Stewart
1953	Brigadoon	Ray Aghayan	May Rose Borum	Jackie Joseph, Paul White, Gayl Gleason, Ray Aghayan, Jack Stewart, Sherwood Price, Zeev Buffman
1954	Blithe Spirit	Diane Delaire and Henri Ficher	Cathy and Sherwood Price	Cathy Browne, Montgomery Reed, Wilmot I. Stewart, Nancy Hadley, Jeanne Brown, Philip Moore
1954	Petticoat Fever		Cathy and Sherwood Price	Sherwood Price, Cathy Browne, Philip Moore, Nancy Hadley, Stanley Mann
1954	The Voice of the Turtle	Philip Moore	Cathy and Sherwood Price	Cathy Browne, Philip Moore
1954	The Country Girl	Ray Aghayan	Cathy and Sherwood Price	Cathy Browne, Sherwood Price, Stanley Mann, Philip Moore, Elizabeth Robbins
1954	Bell, Book and Candle		Cathy and Sherwood Price	Cathy Browne, Philip Moore, Nancy Norvel, Sherwood Price, Stanley Mann
1954	A Christmas Carol	Cathy Browne and Steve Atherton	Cathy and Sherwood Price	Cliffe Hall, Nick Coster, John Trayne, Stanley Mann, Nancy Norvell
1955	Private Lives	Ray Aghayan	Cathy and Sherwood Price	Cathy Browne, Thomas Vize, Sammie Craiker, Philip Moore, Marjorie Ames
1955	Bertha the Beautiful Typewriter Girl		Cathy and Sherwood Price	Sherwood Price, Philip Moore, Marjorie Ames, Judy Howard, Stanley Mann
1955	The Milky Way	Ray Aghayan	Cathy and Sherwood Price	Stanley Mann, Elizabeth Robbins, Sherwood Price, Philip Moore, Paul White
1955	Night Must Fall	Ray Aghayan	Cathy and Sherwood Price	Cathy Browne, Sherwood Price, Nancy Norvell, Stanley Mann, Majorie Ames
1955	The Moon Is Blue	Ray Aghayan	Cathy and Sherwood Price	Cathy Browne, Philip Moore, Stanley Mann, William Secrist
1955	Line Up the Girls!	Ray Aghayan	Cathy and Sherwood Price	An original musical revue with a cast of local amateurs
1956	Picnic	William Schallert	Cathy and Sherwood Price	Cathy Browne, Brad Trumbull, Nancy Hadley, Dianne DeLaire, Jack Stewart, Tommy Vize
1956	Born Yesterday	Robert Vaughn	Cathy and Sherwood Price	Cathy Browne, Sherwood Price, Brad Trumbull, Tommy Vize, David Young
1956	Come Back, Little Sheba	Brad Trumbull	Cathy and Sherwood Price	Dianne DeLaire, Nancy Hadley, Tommy Vize
1956	The Tender Trap	Cathy Browne	Cathy and Sherwood Price	Sherwood Price, Brad Trumbull, Marietta Hayes, Kris Hagen, Lynn Alden
1956	Oh Men! Oh Women!	Monte Reed	Cathy and Sherwood Price	Cathy Browne, Tommy Vize, Kris Hagen, Brad Trumbull, David Young
1957	The Rainmaker	William Schallert	Cathy and Sherwood Price	Brad Trumbull, Cathy Browne, Robert Cornthwaite, Kevin Hagen, Bill Hunt
1957	Champagne Complex	William Schallert	Cathy and Sherwood Price	Joe Flynn, Nancy Hadley, Robert Chapline
1957	The Seven Year Itch	Brad Trumbull	Cathy and Sherwood Price	Bill Hunt, Kipp Hamilton, Robert Chapline, Lonie Blackman, Melora Conway
1957	The Little Hut	Joseph Sargent	Cathy and Sherwood Price	Tommy Vize, Mary Carver, Robert Chapline, Michael Costello
1957	Bus Stop	Brad Trumbull	Cathy and Sherwood Price	Doreen Porter, Don Summers, Sherwood Price, Melora Conway, Kevin Hagen
1958	Boy Meets Girl	Leon Chooluck	Cathy and Sherwood Price	Cathy Browne, Brad Trumbull, Patricia Walter, Jack Grinnage, Joe Conley
1958	Dial M for Murder	Steve Rich	Cathy and Sherwood Price	Cathy Browne, Robert McQueeney, Sherwood Price, Brad Trumbull, Henry Hunter
1958	Anniversary Waltz	Ralph Rose	Cathy and Sherwood Price	Brad Trumbull, Norma Kendall, Henry Hunter, Marcella Connor, Sherwood Price
1958	Janus	Robert Cornthwaite	Cathy and Sherwood Price	Cathy Browne, Brad Trumbull, Henry Hunter, Marcella Connor
1958	Charley's Aunt	Bernard Thompson	Cathy and Sherwood Price	Sherwood Price, Robert McQueeney, Cathy Browne, Jack Grinnage, Jackie Joseph
1959	The Matchmaker	Joseph Sargent	Sherwood Price	Marcella Connors, Henry Hunter, Sherwood Price, Jack Grinnage, Pat Walter
1959	Holiday for Lovers	Robert McQueeney	Sherwood Price	Brad Trumbull, Dorothy Lovett, Elizabeth Altenberg, Henry Hunter, Pat Walter
1959	A Hole in the Head		Sherwood Price	Henry Hunter, Pat Walter, Jack Grinnage, Bill Hunt, Marcella Connors, Brad Trumbull
1959	Visit to a Small Planet	Joseph Sargent	Sherwood Price	Allan Reed, Kathie Browne, Alan Reed Jr, Henry Hunter, Marcella Connors
1959	The Tunnel of Love	Paul Garrison	Sherwood Price	Bill Hunt, Mariellen Smith, Sherwood Price, Pat Walters, Evelyn Bunn
1959	Gigi	Robert Vaughn	Sherwood Price	Kathie Browne, Robert Vaughn, Marcella Connors, Dorothy Lovett, Pat Walters
1960	Once More with Feeling	Werner Klemperer	Sherwood Price	Hugh Marlowe, K. T. Stevens, Henry Hunter, A. G. Vitanza, Robert Gibbons
1960	Who Was That Lady I Saw You With?	Werner Klemperer	Sherwood Price	Lori Nelson, Richard Andrews, Grant Richards, Barney Biro, Pamela Branch
