= The Second Woman (1950 film) =

1950 film by James V. Kern

- Theatrical release poster
- Directed by: James V. Kern
- Screenplay by: Mort Briskin; Robert Smith
- Produced by: Mort Briskin; Robert Smith
- Starring: Robert Young; Betsy Drake
- Cinematography: Hal Mohr
- Edited by: Walter A. Thompson
- Music by: Joseph Nussbaum, arr.
- Production companies: Harry Popkin Productions; Cardinal Pictures
- Distributed by: United Artists
- Release date: July 7, 1950
- Running time: 91 minutes
- Country: United States
- Language: English

The Second Woman is a 1950 American film noir mystery-suspense film featuring Robert Young, Betsy Drake, John Sutton and Florence Bates It was produced and written by Mort Briskin and Robert Smith, directed by James V. Kern, and released by United Artists. Sequences of the film were shot on the coastal areas of Monterey, California.

== Plot ==
Jeff Cohalan, a successful architect, is tormented because his fiancée, Vivian Sheppard, was killed in a mysterious car accident on the night before their wedding. Blaming himself for her death, Cohalan spends his time alone, lamenting in the state-of-the-art cliff-top home he designed for his bride-to-be.

Cohalan notices that ever since the accident, he seems to be followed by bad luck. Without explanation, his horse turns up horribly injured, and he must put it down. His dog is poisoned and dies. These events lead Cohalan to wonder if he has been cursed. Then his modernistic house burns to the ground in a definite case of arson. Cohalan moves in with Ellen Foster and her Aunt Amelia.

Cohalan is attracted to Ellen Foster from the moment they meet. The feeling is mutual. As she learns about Jeff's past, she begins to suspect that he may be much more in danger than he himself realizes.

It turns out that his partner in architecture, Ben Sheppard, is trying to destroy him. Sheppard, who is Vivian's father, holds Jeff responsible for her death. In fact, the driver of the car was Keith Ferris, a married man with whom Vivian was having an affair. Sheppard's own wife, Vivian's mother, ran away from him.

When confronted with the truth about his daughter's car crash, Sheppard has a psychotic event: thinking Ellen is Vivian, and angry about his wife running off, he shoots at Ellen. Jeff is hit protecting her, but both survive.

When Ferris says that their boss is "nuttier than a squirrel", Cohalan knocks him down and orders him to either leave town or be turned in to the authorities. Cohalan and Ellen then resume their romance, free from fear.

== Cast ==
- Robert Young as Jeff Cohalan
- Betsy Drake as Ellen Foster
- John Sutton as Keith Ferris
- Florence Bates as Amelia Foster
- Morris Carnovsky as Dr. Raymond Hartley
- Henry O'Neill as Ben Sheppard
- Jean Rogers as Dodo Ferris
- Raymond Largay as Major Badger
- Shirley Ballard as Vivian Sheppard
- Vici Raaf as Sue as Secretary
- Jason Robards, Sr. as Stacy Rogers (as Jason Robards)
- Steven Geray as Balthazar Jones
- Jimmie Dodd as Mr. Nelson (as Jimmy Dodd)
- Smoki Whitfield as Elmer as Porter (as Smokey Whitfield)
- Cliff Clark as Police Sergeant
- Vince Barnett as Giovanni Strobini, Art Expert

== Reception ==
The New York Times gave a lukewarm review of The Second Woman in 1951, lamenting Kern's "unimaginative direction" and the "unpardonable conduct" of Smith's screenwriting, "The ending comes out of nowhere, a la the solutions so conveniently and annoyingly arrived at by writers of radio mysteries." Variety dubbed Hal Mohr's photography "firstrate" and felt the film was a "fair boxoffice contender" despite the sluggishness of its opening act.

Film critic Craig Butler wrote in an undated Allmovie review: "The Second Woman is an intriguing if frustrating little thriller -- frustrating because it verges on being very good but settles for being merely OK. Part of the problem is that Woman combines elements of various styles -- film noir, psychological drama, mystery, thriller, romance -- but doesn't meld them into a satisfying whole ... All in all, The Second Woman is a good attempt that is worth watching, even if it falls short of reaching its goals."

Film critic Dennis Schwartz wrote in 2004: "Robert Young gives a subdued performance that is somewhat credible, but not all that endearing. The film's ultimate villain is the real estate industry that is spoiling the natural beauty in its need to make lots of money. But the brooding melodrama, thought of by many as film noir, never seemed vibrant as a thriller."

== See also ==
- List of films in the public domain in the United States
