= Shirley Ballard =

American actress (1925–2012)

- Born: Marian Shirley Ballard; September 25, 1925; Los Angeles, California, U.S.
- Died: October 27, 2012 (aged 87); Los Angeles, California, U.S.
- Occupation: Actor
- Years active: 1946-1976
- Spouse: Jason Evers (m. 1953; div. 1966)

Marian Shirley Ballard (September 21, 1925 – October 27, 2012) was an American actress, director and screenwriter who starred in an array of shows and programs.

== Biography ==
Marian Shirley Ballard was born on September 21, 1925 in Los Angeles to George Keneth Ballard and Mildred Randell Ballard. Her father worked as a bookkeeper and her mother was a homemaker.

She won the Miss California beauty pageant in 1944. She was married to Jason Evers from December 1953 to September 1966.

Ballard died on October 27, 2012. She was buried at Forest Lawn Memorial Park in Los Angeles.

== Selected filmography ==
- Easter Parade as Showgirl (uncredited) (1948)
- It's a Great Feeling as Beautiful Girl on Bike (uncredited) (1949)
- The Fargo Phantom as Pat Condon (as Shirlee Allard)
- Tarzan and the Slave Girl (1950)
- The Second Woman as Vivian Sheppard (1950)
- The Desert Hawk as Naga (1950)
- Frenchie as Dealer (uncredited) (1950)
- Scandal Sheet as Telephone Operator (uncredited) (1952)
- Cop Hater as Alice Maguire (1958)
- Bonanza as Belle Trask (1 episode)
- The Twilight Zone (1 episode "Person or Persons Unknown") as Wilma No. 1
- The Laughing Policeman as Grace Martin (1973)
