= Buck Young =

American actor (1920–2000)

- Buck Young in The Andy Griffith Show 1965
- Born: Leon Earl Young, Jr. April 12, 1920
- Died: February 9, 2000 (aged 79); Los Angeles, California, U.S.
- Spouse: Peggy Stewart (m. 1953)
- Children: 2

Leon Earl "Buck" Young, Jr. (April 12, 1920 – February 9, 2000) was an American actor who played the role as Sergeant Whipple on the Gomer Pyle - U.S.M.C. TV series, and Deputy Joe Watson on The Andy Griffith Show.

In 1944, during World War II, Young was drafted into the US Army Air Forces. He married actress Peggy Stewart in 1953 and had two children, Grey Young and Abigail Young who each acted in one film. He was the brother-in-law of Stewart's sister, Patricia O'Rourke, and her husband, Wayne Morris.

In 1962, he appeared three times in James Arness's TV Western series Gunsmoke, playing “Carl” in S7E24’s “Coventry”, “Corporal Stone” in S7E27's “Wagon Girls” & “John” in S8E1’s “Call Me Dodie”.

Buck Young took the part as Sgt Whipple in the Gomer Pyle, U.S.M.C. TV series at the beginning of the show in 1964. He acted in a total of 95 films and the Gomer Pyle. U.S.M.C. series. Buck Young also played in Barnaby Jones in the episode titled “The Last Contract” (12/31/1974).

Young died on February 4, 2000, in Los Angeles at age 79.

== Filmography ==
- Angel Face (1953) – Assistant District Attorney (uncredited)
- The Girls of Pleasure Island (1953) – Marine (uncredited)
- Affair with a Stranger (1953) – Minor Role (uncredited)
- The French Line (1953) – Photographer On Dock (uncredited)
- Money from Home (1953) – (uncredited)
- 3 Ring Circus (1954) – Soldier (uncredited)
- Loving You (1957) – Assistant Director (uncredited)
- Jet Pilot (1957) – Sergeant (uncredited)
- Official Detective (1958) - Marty Lacker (Episode: "The Wristwatch")
- The Silent Service (1958) - Fox (Episode: "The S-44 Story"
- Night of the Quarter Moon (1959) – Reporter (uncredited)
- Not with My Wife, You Don't! (1966) – Air Police Colonel
- The Young Warriors (1966) – Schumacher
- The Bamboo Saucer (1968) – Pete (uncredited)
- Suppose They Gave a War and Nobody Came (1970) – Deputy Ron
- The Late Liz (1971) – Logan Pearson
- The Men from Shiloh (rebranded name of The Virginian) (1971) - Carter Reed ("The Town Killer")
- Pickup on 101 (1972) – Car Family of Four #1
- Breezy (1973) – Paula's Escort
- Lepke (1975) – Second Reporter
- Mitchell (1975) – Detective Aldridge
- White House Madness (1975) – Admiral
- Two-Minute Warning (1976) – Baltimore Booster #1
- Claws (1977) – Pilot
- The Magic of Lassie (1978) – T.V. Announcer
- The Lady in Red (1979) – Hennessey
- Death Wish II (1982) – Charles Pearce
- Sam's Son (1984) – Marv Gates
- Last Resort (1986) – Mr. Emerson
