= Sherwood Price =

American actor (1928–2020)

- Price in Death Valley Days, 1968
- Born: Frank Sherwood Gell; April 4, 1928; Detroit, Michigan, U.S.
- Died: January 13, 2020 (aged 91)
- Education: Schuster-Martin School of Drama
- Occupations: Actor, Producer
- Years active: 1948–1995
- Spouses: Kathie Browne (m. 1953; div. 1961) Mary LaRoche (m. 1967; died. 1999)

Frank Sherwood Gell (April 4, 1928 – January 13, 2020) was an American film and television actor. He was known for playing General J. E. B. Stuart in the American historical television series The Gray Ghost.

== Early life ==
He was born Frank Sherwood Gell in Detroit, Michigan, to Louis and Freida Gell, Jewish immigrants from Imperial Russia who had come to the US as young children. He had one sibling, an older sister. His parents had different first languages (Russian and Yiddish); he grew up speaking only English. His father owned a butcher shop. His parents divorced while Price was still a child. His mother remarried, and Price was raised by her and his step-father Herman Glassman, a clothing salesman.

Price attended Central High School in Detroit, taking the commercial curriculum rather than college prep. While still in high school he registered for the draft on April 4, 1946, his eighteenth birthday. The registrar recorded him as being 5 feet 11 inches and weighing 132 pounds, with brown hair and brown eyes. He worked as a dishwasher, theater usher, and gas station attendant to earn money for drama school.

== Early stage career ==
Price enrolled at the Schuster-Martin School of Drama in the Walnut Hills neighborhood of Cincinnati during August 1947. He spent one year studying then joined the school's Little Playhouse Company after graduation. He performed in five plays during 1948–1949, using "Sherwood Gell" for billing.

He then joined the Piper Players national touring company in their Oklahoma City debut, where he handled both acting and production chores. The Piper Players hit a cash crisis and found their only money maker was doing children's matinees of Little Red Riding Hood, which they played around the country. When the tour he was with reached the Warner Hollywood Theatre, Price decided to remain and left the company, moving in with his married older sister and her family.

By 1952 he had adopted the stage name "Sherwood Price". He was managing a movie theater in Sherman Oaks when he performed in his first film, Scorching Fury.

His first known stage credit under his new billing came in May 1953, when he played the lead in the Showcase Theater production of Detective Story, earning high praise from the LA Times drama critic.

== Tustin Playbox ==
During July 1953 Price took the role of the psychoanalyst in the play Lady in the Dark with the Tustin Playbox company. It was his first work with this community theatre, which he would be associated with for many years. Also in this play was professional Jacquelyn Sue Browne, then billed as "Cathy Browne", but who would later switch to Kathie Browne. Price and Cathy Browne took over as co-producers for the third summer season (1954) of the Tustin Playbox, while continuing to act in performances. Browne was very popular with the Tustin audiences, and so often played the female lead.

For the next four years Browne and Price successfully co-produced the Playbox, with each season bringing in larger audiences, including television stars and producers who hired them for screen roles based on their stage performances. The Los Angeles Times noted that the Playbox was actually making money, a rare event for community summer stock. The ailing Laguna Playhouse even recruited the couple to take over producing chores there as well for the 1957 season.

By the 1959 season Sherwood Price Productions assumed sole control of the Tustin Playbox, while Browne's performances there tapered off in favor of her growing screen career. However, for the 1960 season Price overextended himself financially by opening a second troupe in Fullerton, California, causing both to be attached in July by creditors.

== Television and other projects ==
Price's first television work came in the fall of 1955. Mark Stevens arranged for Price to have a role in an episode of the series in which he was starring, Big Town, after seeing him at Tustin. The next year, John Bromfield of Sheriff of Cochise did the same, after watching Price in The Tender Trap at the Playbox Price had parts in three other TV series in 1956, and small uncredited bits in two films, The Revolt of Mamie Stover and the misleadingly titled D-Day the Sixth of June.

Despite the press of activity managing the Tustin Playbox, Price plunged into a recurring role on the series The Gray Ghost. Filmed during late spring of 1957 in Northern California, Price played General J.E.B. Stuart for seven episodes.

== Later screen career ==
Price then played Pete Hallon in the 1959 film City of Fear, which starred Vince Edwards.

Price played Gus Romay in the 1961 film Blueprint for Robbery, which starred J. Pat O'Malley. He guest-starred in television programs including Gunsmoke, Bonanza, Rawhide, Highway Patrol, Perry Mason, The Life and Legend of Wyatt Earp, Mannix, 77 Sunset Strip, Cheyenne, Death Valley Days, The Misadventures of Sheriff Lobo, Have Gun - Will Travel, and Wagon Train. Price had a recurring role as Owen Carter in the medical drama television series Ben Casey. He also played Lt. Edgar Hackett in the 1968 film Ice Station Zebra, which starred Rock Hudson, Ernest Borgnine, Patrick McGoohan and Jim Brown. In 1969, Price starred with Robert Vaughn in the play The Odd Couple at the Sir John Falstaff Theater in St. Louis, Missouri. He played Felix Unger.

Price died in January 2020, at the age of 91.

== Personal life ==
After a summer working together, Cathy Browne and Price announced their engagement in September 1953. They were wed November 22, 1953, at the Chapman Park Hotel in Los Angeles.

In his 2008 memoir, A Fortunate Life, actor Robert Vaughn describes Price as his "lifelong best friend". They were also business partners, making documentaries through their Ferdporqui production company.

== Stage performances ==
Performances only, see Tustin Playbox for plays as producer
Year	Play	Role	Venue	Notes
1948	The Hasty Heart	Blossom	Schuster-Martin Playhouse	War drama from 1945 by John Patrick; Price was only non-veteran in cast
1948	The Front Page		Schuster-Martin Playhouse	As with all his credits prior to 1952, he was billed as "Sherwood Gell"
1948	Treasure Island	Jim Hawkins	Schuster-Martin Playhouse	Price had the lead in this Little Playhouse Company adaptation
1949	You Can't Take It With You		Schuster-Martin Playhouse	
1949	The Time of Your Life		Schuster-Martin Playhouse	
1950	Boy Meets Girl		Vogue Theater (OKC)	His first play with the Piper Players
1950	George Washington Slept Here		Vogue Theater (OKC)	
1950	Wuthering Heights	(Production)	Vogue Theater (OKC)	Price did only business and production for this small cast play
1950	Curse You, Villain!		Vogue Theater (OKC)	A melodrama revival played for laughs
1950	Dr. Jekyll and Mr. Hyde		Vogue Theater (OKC)	
1950	Dear Ruth		Criterion Theater (OKC)	
1950	Little Red Riding Hood		Touring Company	The Piper Players, low on cash, were reduced to playing this children's matinee
1953	Detective Story	Det. McLeod	Showcase Theater (LA)	His first known stage credit as "Sherwood Price"
1953	Lady in the Dark	Dr. Brooks	Tustin Playbox	His first play at Tustin also starred Cathy Browne
1953	Miranda	Paul Marten	Tustin Playbox	Price and Cathy Browne played the leads in this Peter Blackmore comedy
1953	Caesar and Cleopatra	Apollodorus	Tustin Playbox	Tony Carbone and Cathy Browne played the leads
1953	Brigadoon		Tustin Playbox	Price's supporting role was praised by the Los Angeles Times reviewer
1954	Petticoat Fever	Sir James Felton	Tustin Playbox	Price and Cathy Browne played the leads in this 1935 Mark Reed comedy
1954	The Country Girl	Frank Elgin	Tustin Playbox	
1954	Bell, Book and Candle	Nicholas Holroyd	Tustin Playbox	
1955	Bertha the Beautiful Typewriter Girl	Villain	Tustin Playbox	Early melodrama played for laughs
1955	The Milky Way	Gabby Sloan	Tustin Playbox	
1955	Night Must Fall	Dan	Tustin Playbox	Price plays the suspected killer opposite Cathy Brown's "Olivia Grayne"
1956	Born Yesterday	Paul Verrall	Tustin Playbox	Robert Vaughn directed, Cathy Browne played female lead
1956	The Tender Trap	Charlie Reader	Tustin Playbox	Cathy Browne directed this play
1957	Will Success Spoil Rock Hunter?	Michael Freeman	Laguna Playhouse	With Roxanne Arlen, Jack Grinnage, Robert Cornthwaite, Tommy Vize and Brad Trumbull
1957	Bus Stop	Will Masters	Tustin Playbox	With Doreen Porter, Melora Conway, and Brad Trumbull
1958	Boy Meets Girl	Minor characters	Tustin Playbox	Price played a succession of outlandish minor characters
1958	Dial M for Murder	Swann/Captain Lesgate	Tustin Playbox	Price plays the criminal killed by Browne's character
1958	Anniversary Waltz	Chris Steelman	Tustin Playbox	
1958	Charley's Aunt	Lord Fancourt Babberly	Tustin Playbox	
1959	The Matchmaker	Cornelius Hackl	Tustin Playbox	
1959	Tunnel of Love	Dick Pepper	Tustin Playbox	
1969	The Odd Couple	Felix Unger	(St. Louis)	Robert Vaughn co-starred in this production

== Filmography ==
Film (by year of first release)
Year	Title	Role	Notes
1952	Scorching Fury	Ward Canepa	His first billing as "Sherwood Price". It is doubtful whether this film was ever distributed to theatres or exhibited.
1956	The Revolt of Mamie Stover	Sailor	An uncredited role
1956	D-Day the Sixth of June	American Officer	Another uncredited role
1957	5 Steps to Danger		Uncredited role as one of many killers after Sterling Hayden
1959	City of Fear	Pete Hallon	Price and Cathy Browne's only movie together was filmed in early spring 1958
1961	Blueprint for Robbery	Gus Romay	Ensemble effort, filled with TV character actors and no stars
1963	The Man from Galveston	George Taggart	The pilot for the Temple Houston TV series, released to theaters instead
1964	The Patsy	Bellboy	A cameo appearance, in a film filled with them
1968	Ice Station Zebra	Lt. Edgar Hackett	
1995	Last of the Dogmen	Tracker	Price's last known performing credit

Television (in original broadcast order)
Year	Series	Episode	Role	Notes
1955	Big Town	Juvenile Gangs		Price's first known TV credit came from being spotted by Mark Stevens at the Tustin Playbox
1956	I Led 3 Lives	Dead Man	Comrade Adams	
1956	Navy Log	Sacrifice	Russ Carter	This starred Phil Tead, with Carleton Young, William Tracy, and Leonard Nimoy
1956	Frontier			Both Price and Browne were in this unknown episode from summer 1956
1956	Sheriff of Cochise			Star John Bromfield asked for Price after seeing him at Tustin Playbox
1957	Wire Service			Price and Browne had husband-wife roles in this unknown episode with Mercedes McCambridge
1957	Navy Log	Ito of Attu	G.I.	
1957	Dragnet	The Big Yak		
1957	The Gray Ghost	An Eye for an Eye	Gen. Jeb Stuart	The only recurring role for Price, filmed in Northern California
1957	The Gray Ghost	Horses for Stuart	Gen. Jeb Stuart	
1957	The Eve Arden Show			Price made this unknown episode in between plays at Tustin and Laguna
1958	The Gray Ghost	Sealed Orders	Gen. Jeb Stuart	
1958	The Gray Ghost	The Escape	Gen. Jeb Stuart	
1958	Turn of Fate	The Days of November		Korean War story with Jack Lemmon, Adam Williams, Nick Dennis, Don Kelly, and Jimmy Goodwin
1958	The Gray Ghost	The Rivals	Gen. Jeb Stuart	
1958	The Gray Ghost	Secret and Urgent	Gen. Jeb Stuart	
1958	The Gray Ghost	The Gallant Foe	Gen. Jeb Stuart	
1958	Decision	Man on a Raft	Intern	Another series where star Mark Stevens asked for Price
1962	Lawman	The Doctor	Will Evans	
