= Mark Tapscott =

American actor and vaudeville entertainer

- Born: Mark Loren Tapscott; December 15, 1924; Bellflower, California, U.S.
- Died: September 10, 1993 (aged 68); Los Angeles, California, U.S.
- Occupation: Actor
- Years active: 1957–1987
- Spouse(s): Frances Mae Ferrell (m. 1945; died 1969); Sybil L. Line (m. 1970)

Mark Loren Tapscott (December 15, 1924 – September 10, 1993) was an American character actor in film and television, best known as a regular cast member of the long-running daytime soap opera Days of Our Lives, wherein Tapscott portrayed the character Bob Anderson throughout most of the 1970s.

== Early life and career ==
Born in Bellflower, California on December 15, 1924, and raised there and in North Platte, Nebraska, Tapscott was the son of Leola (née Walrath) and John H. Tapscott. He attended Whittier State School and Bakersfield Junior College.

Tapscott served with the United States Marines in both World War II and the Korean War. Following his service in the Korean War, Tapscott attended the University of Oregon, graduating in 1956.

On May 22, 1976, at a musical celebration staged in Long Beach by the California Masonic Lodge in observance of the nation's Bicentennial, Tapscott portrayed George Washington, while colleague Royal Dano once again reprised his most famous role. (Note: A list of portrayals extending at least as far back as December 1941, when Dano, then a student at Haaren High School in Manhattan's Hell's Kitchen, created what Ralph Warner of The Daily Worker deemed "a vivid, graphic Abraham Lincoln".)

== Personal life and death ==
From November 1945 until her death in 1969, Tapscott was married to Frances Mae Ferrell. About 10 months after their marriage, the couple celebrated the birth of an almost 8-pound baby girl, Teddy Norene. Tapscott remarried in 1970, to Sybil L. Line.

Tapscott died on September 10, 1993, of lung cancer.

== Selected filmography ==
=== Films ===
- Kings Go Forth (1958) – Captain Harrison
- The Christine Jorgensen Story (1970) – Sergeant (uncredited)
- The Late Liz (1971) – Tony Webb
- The Organization (1971) – Captain Grayson
- Black Gunn (1972) – Cassidy

=== Television ===
- The Silent Service
  - "Operation Seadragon" (1958) – Lt. Charles Manning
- The Rough Riders
  - "The Maccabites" (1958) – Tranko
- Maverick
  - "The Long Hunt" (1957) – Player No. 1
  - "Stampede" (1957) – Deputy
  - "The Thirty-Ninth Star" (1958) – Charles W. Farfan
  - "The Spanish Dancer" (1958) – Charlie
  - "The Strange Journey of Jenny Hill" (1959) – Prosecutor Crowley
  - "Trooper Maverick" (1959) – Sgt. Rogers
  - "The Devil's Necklace, Pts 1 & 2" (1958) – Enlisted Man
- Have Gun Will Travel
  - "Hunt the Man Down" (1959) – Tom Semper
- Black Saddle
  - "Client: Steele" (1959) – Peter Hale
- Hotel de Paree
  - "Vein of Ore" (1959) – Arlington Rand
- Rawhide
  - "Incident on the Road Back" (1961)
  - "Incident of the Wager on Payday" (1961) – Deputy
- The Case of the Dangerous Robin
  - "The Dead Ringer" (1961) – Nat Barnes
- The Tall Man
  - Numerous Season 2 episodes (1962) – Andy (the deputy)
- The Big Valley
  - "The Great Safe Robbery" (1966) – Sheriff
  - "Rimfire" (1968) – Miner
  - "Hell Hath No Fury" (1968) – Phil
  - "The Profit and the Lost" (1968) – Bates
  - "The Battle of Mineral Springs" (1969) – Mark
- Lancer
  - "Lamp in the Wilderness"
- Bonanza
  - "Sound of Drums" (1970) – Joe Sabin
  - "Long Way to Ogden" (1970) – Steve Rance
  - "The Night Virginia City Died" (1970) – Hamilton
- The Silent Force
  - "The Prosecutor" [series premiere] (1970) – Sheriff Harold Williamson
- Days of Our Lives
  - Regular character (1972–1980) – Bob Anderson
- The Young and the Restless
  - Recurring character (1982–1983) – Earl Bancroft (Note: Father of Nikki Newman's then-boyfriend, Kevin Bancroft.)
- Highway to Heaven
  - "Gift of Life" (1987) – Councilman

== Book sources ==
- Lentz, Harris (1996). Western and Frontier Film and Television Credits 1903–1995. McFarland & Company. ISBN 0-7864-0218-0.
