= Claws (film) =

1977 horror-thriller film

- Theatrical release poster
- Directed by: Richard Bansbach; Robert E. Pearson
- Written by: Chuck D. Keen; Brian Russell
- Produced by: Chuck D. Keen
- Starring: Jason Evers; Leon Ames; Anthony Caruso
- Cinematography: Chuck D. Keen
- Edited by: Richard Bansbach
- Music by: Gene Kauer; Douglas M. Lackey
- Distributed by: Can Am
- Release date: 1977
- Running time: 100 minutes
- Country: United States
- Language: English

Claws is a 1977 U.S. horror-thriller film. Released soon after the highly successful Jaws, Claws attempted to translate the man-meets-deadly-animal theme to Alaska.

== Cast ==
- Jason Evers as Jason Monroe
- Leon Ames as Commissioner
- Anthony Caruso as Henry
- Carla Layton as Chris
- Glenn Sipes as Howard
- Buck Young as Pilot
- Myron Healey as Sheriff
- Buck Monroe as Buck Monroe
- Wayne Lonacre as Gil Evans
- Bill Ratcliffe as Marshal

== Production ==
Claws was shot on location in and around Juneau by Alaska Pictures, an independent production company.

== Critical response ==
Critic Jon Abrams labels Claws "a mishmash of most of the popular genre tropes at the time" of release, but praises the independent film for its "impressive array of stock footage."
