= Wink of an Eye =

- Star Trek: The Original Series episode
- Episode no.: Season 3 Episode 11
- Directed by: Jud Taylor
- Story by: Lee Cronin
- Teleplay by: Arthur Heinemann
- Cinematography by: Al Francis
- Production code: 068
- Original air date: November 29, 1968

Guest appearances
- Kathie Browne – Deela; Erik Holland – Ekor; Jason Evers – Rael; Geoffrey Binney – Compton; Richard Geary – Scalosian; William Blackburn – Lt. Hadley; Roger Holloway – Lt. Lemli

Episode chronology
← Previous "Plato's Stepchildren"	Next → "The Empath"
- Star Trek: The Original Series season 3

"Wink of an Eye" is the eleventh episode of the third season of the American science fiction television series Star Trek. Written by Arthur Heinemann, based on a story by Gene L. Coon (under the pen name Lee Cronin), and directed by Jud Taylor, it was first broadcast on November 29, 1968.

In the episode, normally invisible time-accelerated aliens take over the Enterprise and attempt to abduct the crew for use as breeding stock.

== Plot ==
In answer to a distress call, the Federation starship Enterprise arrives at the planet Scalos. Captain Kirk beams down with a landing party to a city with no evidence of life, except for an intermittent insect-like buzzing. Crewman Compton disappears before Dr. McCoy's eyes, and Kirk orders the landing party back to the Enterprise. Upon their return, the ship begins to experience strange malfunctions, and Engineering reports the sudden appearance of an unknown device attached to the ship's life support systems. Kirk and Spock attempt to disconnect the device but are prevented from doing so by an unseen force.

Back on the bridge, Kirk decides to consult with the Enterprise's computers for possible counteractions against what they call the enemy, then allow the unseen enemy to take the next step, and asks for coffee. As he sips it, the bridge crew appears to slow down. Suddenly, a beautiful woman in a colorful gown appears on the bridge and greets Kirk warmly before introducing herself: "Deela, the enemy," in response to the computer's designation of her people for their actions on the ship.

Deela explains that Kirk has been placed in a state of hyperacceleration, rendering him invisible to the rest of his crew, in order to allow him to see and hear the Scalosians. When pressed as to why this has been done, Deela admits that she is the Scalosians' queen, and Kirk will become their king and enjoy life on Scalos. Kirk attempts to parley with Deela to stay with her on Scalos in return for having her people repair the Enterprise and release it with its crew, but she refuses his offer.

Kirk attempts to stun Deela, only for her to laugh and insist that he point the weapon at her and try it. The captain complies, and is stunned to find the phaser beam is slowed down within Deela's hyperaccelerated existence: she easily evades the stun beam and disarms Kirk with her Scalosian side-arm. Queen Deela assures a frustrated Captain Kirk that nothing can be done to change his new existence or return him to his crew as he insists.

Kirk returns to Life Support and discovers that Compton is still alive, having also been accelerated, and is willingly working with the Scalosians, having taught the intruding aliens how to operate the Enterprise's systems. After Deela's chief scientist Rael incapacitates Kirk with his Scalosian weapon, Compton turns against the Scalosians for harming his captain, only to be knocked back by a physical blow to draw blood; he rapidly ages and dies. A worried Scalosian woman named Mira, with whom Compton was selected to mate, is placated by Rael: "another will be secured for you".

After a confrontation with Rael, Kirk surmises that the unknown device is intended to turn the Enterprise into a cryogenic storage unit. He records a message to Spock explaining what he has learnt; Deela, confident in her people's success, allows this. Their plan, she explains, is to use the Enterprise crew to help propagate their species, whose men have been rendered sterile by the same natural disaster that caused their accelerated state. After a heated debate on the ethics of this plan, Kirk rushes away and disables the transporter. Deela, finding it inoperative, pretends to believe Kirk's claim to be ignorant of the problem.

Kirk begins to exhibit the sort of docility seen with Compton; however, this is a ruse that allows him to seize Deela's weapon. On his way to Life Support, Kirk meets newly accelerated Spock, who has heard Kirk's message and determined the cause of his hyperacceleration was a dose of the polluted Scalosian water. The two arrive at Life Support, where Kirk uses the Scalosian weapon to stun Rael and destroy the cryogenic device.

After transporting Deela and her party back to the planet, Spock reveals that he has brought a possible antidote to the Scalosian water. Kirk takes a dose immediately, while Spock takes advantage of his accelerated state to effect repairs on the Enterprise.

== Reception ==
Star Trek novelist Dayton Ward judged that "the setup for 'Wink of an Eye' is interesting enough at first blush — a race of beings who move through time at a rate so fast that they're all but undetectable. Unfortunately, it's upon the second and subsequent blushes that the concept begins to fall apart." He writes that the Scalosians had too limited imagination for continuing their race, and that mating with members of other species would be no help. He found the science wanting, though "I have to admit that here it provides for one of the series' more original 'redshirt deaths.'" Ward did admire the set design: "Clever use of tilted camera angles and lighting help to sell the illusion of the characters moving about the ship at their hyper-accelerated rate. One nice touch is the slowing down of the various lights and gauges that fill the bridge's workstations when Kirk and Deela are there."

David Alan Mack, also a Star Trek novelist, wrote, "It's not a bad idea for an episode, but the execution on this one felt sorely lacking." He noted some gaps in logic: "Still, how does one propagate a species by mating one's women with aliens? ... And if time moves so slowly for them, why would they need to place the Enterprise crew in suspended animation? Wouldn't a few days' worth of knockout drugs suffice?"

Zack Handlen of The A.V. Club was unimpressed by the episode, assigning it a B− and noting some plot holes: "They manage to beam aboard the Enterprise somehow, which doesn't make a lot of sense, science-wise. If their speed makes them invisible to the computer as life-forms, how would the transporter even work? Especially since they get brought on without anyone on the ship realizing it." Handlen judges that the "hook is clever," although "the ep might've been stronger if it had spent more time focusing on the mystery, and the danger that mystery represented, instead of dropping Kirk down the rabbit hole and spoiling the question so early on." He concludes, "In a stronger season, 'Eye' would've been a low spot, a perfunctory by-the-numbers programmer which, while not embarrassing, wouldn't have made much of an impression. Here, it reminds us that, for a while anyway, competency was the least we could hope to expect from the series."

Melissa N. Hayes-Gehrke of the University of Maryland found more problems with the science:

Unfortunately, the ramifications of the accelerated living just do not stand up under scrutiny. If a Scalosian stays in one place for awhile — even just to have a protracted conversation — he should become visible, albeit briefly, to a normal person. We didn't see any indication that this could happen. Kirk fires his phaser at Deela and she steps out of the way because the beam is moving so slowly. This is patently ridiculous; phaser beams travel at the speed of light, and no object with mass can travel faster than that. From a practical perspective, how do the ship's doors know to open for the Scalosians, when the ship's sensors cannot detect them? How can the Scalosians flip and slide switches (like the transporter controls), that are not designed to move so quickly, without breaking them?

StarTrekReviews.com found some praise: "There's no character interaction between our heroes, save for the wonderful moment when Kirk meets Spock in the corridor and simply smiles".

== Releases ==
This episode was released in Japan on December 21, 1993, as part of the complete season 3 LaserDisc set, Star Trek: Original Series log.3. A trailer for this and the other episodes was also included, and the episode had English and Japanese audio tracks. The cover script was スター・トレック TVサードシーズン

This episode was included in TOS Season 3 remastered DVD box set, with the remastered version of this episode.

== See also ==
- "Blink of an Eye" — a Star Trek: Voyager episode involving time acceleration
- "The New Accelerator", a short story with a similar premise
