= Renata Vanni =

Italian-born American film actress

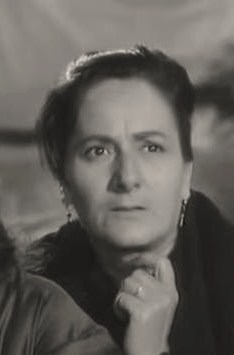
- Vanni in Frontier Uprising
- Born: 12 October 1909; Naples, Kingdom of Italy
- Died: 19 February 2004 (aged 94); Los Angeles, California; United States
- Occupation: Actress
- Years active: 1949–1989 (film & TV)

Renata Vanni (12 October 1909 – 19 February 2004) was an Italian-born American film actress. She was better known for the films Pay or Die, A Patch of Blue and Lady in White.

== Filmography ==
- El Paso (1949) as Lupita Montez (uncredited)
- The Doctor and the Girl (1949) as Mrs. Crisani, Tony's Mother (uncredited)
- Stop That Cab (1951) as Josephine Moscadella
- Strictly Dishonorable (1951) as Mrs. Peccatori (uncredited)
- Westward the Women (1951) as Mrs. Moroni
- When in Rome (1952) as Mrs. Maroni (uncredited)
- Trouble Along the Way (1953) as Maria's Italian Mother (uncredited)
- The Command (1954) as Mrs. Pellegrini (uncredited)
- Three Coins in the Fountain (1954) as Anna (uncredited)
- The Seven Little Foys (1955) as Ballerina Mistress in Milan (uncredited)
- It's Always Fair Weather (1955) as Mother (uncredited)
- Hell on Frisco Bay (1955) as Anna Amato
- Serenade (1956) as Village Woman (uncredited)
- The Man in the Gray Flannel Suit (1956) as Italian Farmer's Wife (uncredited)
- Somebody Up There Likes Me (1956) Minor Role (uncredited)
- Four Girls in Town (1957) as Rosa (uncredited)
- Ten Thousand Bedrooms (1957) as Maid (uncredited)
- The Midnight Story (1957) as Señora Bergatina (uncredited)
- The Hard Man (1957) as Juanita
- The Walter Winchell File (1958, TV Series) as Maria
- The Beat Generation (1959) as Mrs. Rosa Costa (uncredited)
- The Jayhawkers! (1959) as Indian Woman
- Pay or Die (1960) as Mom Saulino
- Frontier Uprising (1961) as Augustina
- The Alfred Hitchcock Hour (1963) (Season 2 Episode 9: "The Dividing Wall") as Woman Customer
- Perry Mason (1964, S8E6, The Case of the Nautical Knot) as Rosa Martinez
- The Greatest Story Ever Told (1965) as Weeping Woman (uncredited)
- A Patch of Blue (1965) as Mrs. Favaloro
- Bob & Carol & Ted & Alice (1969) as Chianti Woman (uncredited)
- A Dream of Kings (1969) as Mrs. Falconis
- The Last Porno Flick (1974) as Concetta
- Murder in the First Person Singular (1974, TV Movie) as Mrs. Montopollis
- Once Is Not Enough (1975) as Maria
- I Will... I Will... For Now (1976) as Receptionist
- Fatso (1980) as Zi Marie
- The Idolmaker (1980) as Mrs. Bevaloqua
- Margin for Murder (1981, TV Movie) as Mama De Fellita
- Frank Nitti: The Enforcer (1988, TV Movie)
- Lady in White (1988) as Mama Assunta
- Wait Until Spring, Bandini (1989) as Donna Toscana (final film role)

== Bibliography ==
- Pitts, Michael R. Western Movies: A Guide to 5,105 Feature Films. McFarland, 2012.
