= City of Fear (1959 film) =

1959 film

- Theatrical release poster
- Directed by: Irving Lerner
- Written by: Robert Dillon; Steven Ritch
- Produced by: Leon Chooluck
- Starring: Vince Edwards; Lyle Talbot; John Archer
- Cinematography: Lucien Ballard
- Edited by: Robert Lawrence
- Music by: Jerry Goldsmith
- Distributed by: Columbia Pictures Corporation
- Release date: February 1959
- Running time: 81 minutes
- Country: United States
- Language: English

City of Fear is a 1959 American film noir directed by Irving Lerner.

== Plot ==
Vince, an escaped convict from San Quentin headed for Los Angeles, has a canister in his possession that he thinks has heroin inside of it. It does not; instead, it contains Cobalt-60, a dangerous nuclear substance with enough radiation to kill most of the population of Los Angeles. As continued exposure to the element is slowly killing Vince, authorities move to capture him and the canister.

== Cast ==
- Vince Edwards as Vince Ryker
- Lyle Talbot as Chief Jensen
- John Archer as Lt. Mark Richards
- Steven Ritch as Dr. John Wallace
- Patricia Blair as June Marlowe
- Kelly Thordsen as Detective Sgt. Hank Johnson
- Joseph Mell as Eddie Crown
- Sherwood Price as Pete Hallon
- Kathie Browne as Jeannie (as Cathy Browne)
- Tony Lawrence as Hitchhiking Sailor (uncredited)
