= The Late Liz =

- Directed by: Dick Ross
- Screenplay by: Bill Rega
- Based on: The Late Liz by Elizabeth Burns
- Produced by: Dick Ross
- Starring: Anne Baxter; Steve Forrest; James Gregory; Coleen Gray; Joan Hotchkis; Jack Albertson
- Cinematography: Harry Stradling Jr.
- Edited by: Michael Pozen
- Music by: Ralph Carmichael
- Production company: Dick Ross Productions
- Distributed by: Gateway Films
- Release date: September 22, 1971
- Running time: 119 minutes
- Country: United States
- Language: English

The Late Liz is a 1971 American drama film directed by Dick Ross and written by Bill Rega. It is based on the 1957 book The Late Liz by Gertrude Behanna (pen name Elizabeth Burns). The film stars Anne Baxter, Steve Forrest, James Gregory, Coleen Gray, Joan Hotchkis and Jack Albertson. The film was released on September 22, 1971, by Gateway Films.

== Cast ==
- Anne Baxter as Liz Addams Hatch
- Steve Forrest as Jim Hatch
- James Gregory as Sam Burns
- Coleen Gray as Sue Webb
- Joan Hotchkis as Sally Pearson
- Jack Albertson as Gordon Rogers
- Eloise Hardt as Laura Valon
- Don Lamond as Steve Blake
- Buck Young as Logan Pearson
- Lee Delano as Joe Vito
- Stephen Dunne as Si Addams
- Reid Smith as Alan Trowbridge
- William Katt as Peter Addams
- Virginia Capers as Martha
- Alvy Moore as Bill Morris
- Nancy Hadley as Edie Morris
- John Baer as Arthur Bryson
- Mark Tapscott as Tony Webb
- Larkin Ford as Dr. Robinson
- San Christopher as Nurse Eaton
- John Craig as Herb Lillis
- Gail Bonney as Gladys
- Ivor Francis as Dr. Murray
- Ann Summers as Sister Ellen
- Kathleen Hughes as Elaine Rich
- Foster Brooks as Howard Borman
- Lani Kai as Manu
- Leon Lontoc as Sonny Kalani
- Calvert Bothelo as Johnny T
- Lorraine Davies as Liz' Mother
- Jackson Bostwick as Randall Trowbridge
