= Joan Hotchkis =

American actress (1927–2022)

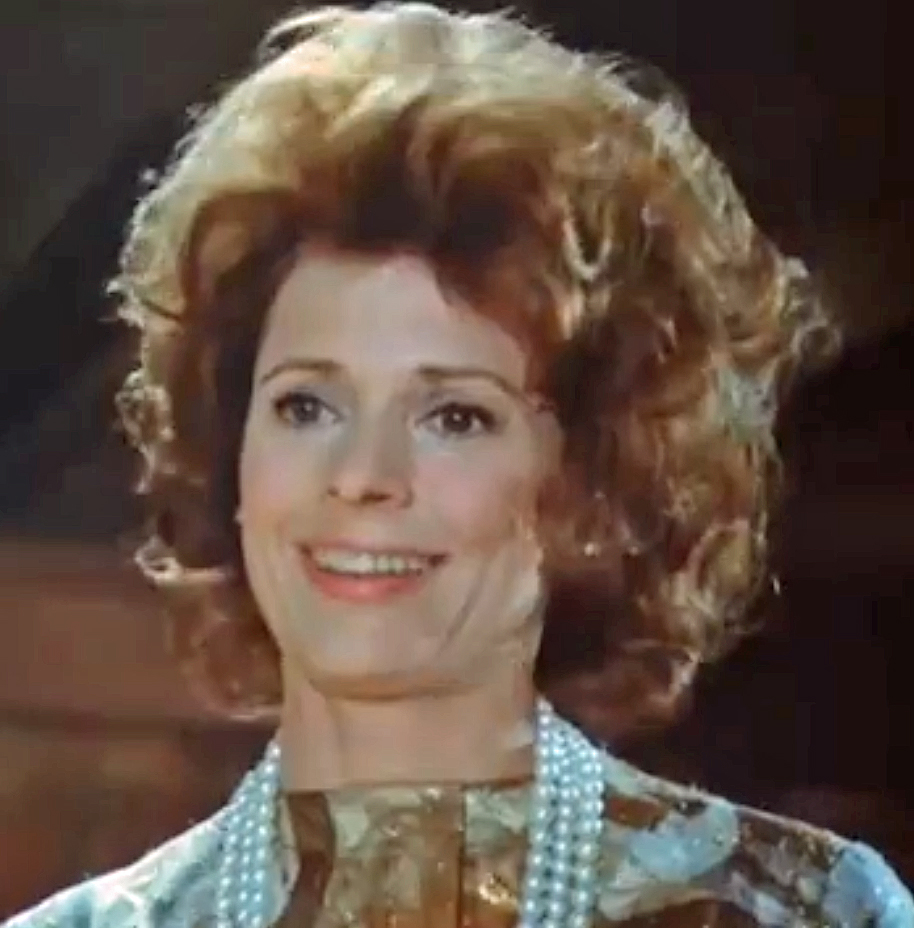
- Hotchkis in a trailer for Breezy (1973)
- Born: September 21, 1927; Los Angeles, California, U.S.
- Died: September 27, 2022 (aged 95); Los Angeles, California, U.S.
- Occupations: Actor, writer, performance artist
- Years active: c. 1954–1997
- Spouse: Robert Foster (m. 1958; div. 1967)
- Children: 1

Joan Hotchkis (September 21, 1927 – September 27, 2022) was an American stage, screen and television actress, writer and performance artist. A lifetime member of the Actors Studio and the Dramatists Guild, Hotchkis was best known for playing Dr. Nancy Cunningham for several seasons on The Odd Couple, for co-writing with Eric Morris the seminal acting manual "No Acting Please" (1977), which is still used in colleges and conservatories, and for her groundbreaking performance art works in the 1990s.

== Early life ==
Hotchkis was born in Los Angeles on September 21, 1927. Her father, Preston, worked in insurance and investment; her mother, Katharine (Bixby), hailed from a family of cattle ranchers in Orange County that turned Rancho Los Alamitos into a 26,000-acre cattle ranch. Hotchkis was raised in San Marino, and attended Westridge School in nearby Pasadena. She studied at Smith College, graduating with a Bachelor of Arts in 1949. She then obtained a master's degree in Early Childhood Education from Bank Street Teachers College three years later, before teaching nursery school and kindergarten for three years.

== Career ==
At the age of 26, Hotchkis switched from teaching to acting, joining the Actors Studio and studying acting in New York City. She made her Broadway debut in Advise and Consent, adapted from the novel by the same name. From the 1950s through the 1990s, Hotchkis played various roles in television, film and theater (summer stock and Broadway). She was featured in Broadway productions of It's a Bird It's a Plane It's Superman (Philadelphia previews), and Write Me A Murder, before playing Myra on the soap opera The Secret Storm for several years in the early 1960s. She moved back to Los Angeles in 1967 and worked steadily in television through the 1970s. Most notably, Hotchkis played Dr. Nancy Cunningham, sometime girlfriend of Oscar Madison on the television version of The Odd Couple and Ellen in the Emmy-winning series My World and Welcome to It.

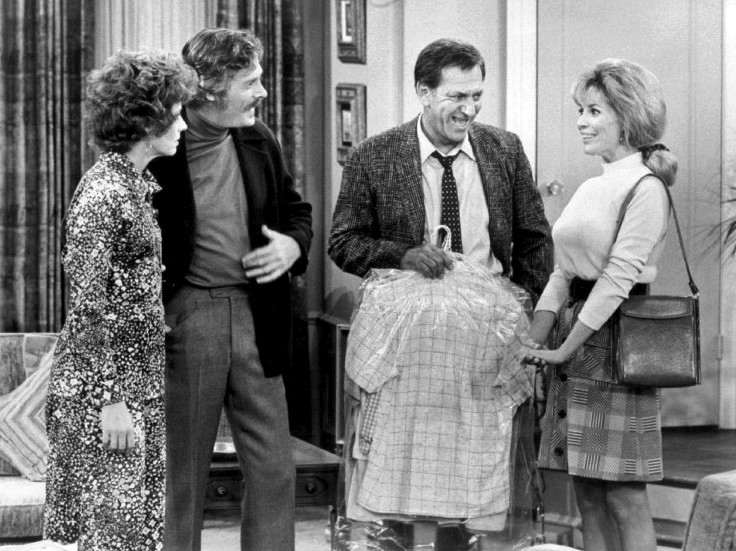
Scene from The Odd Couple with (from left): Hotchkis and fellow actors Fred Beir, Jack Klugman, and Janis Hansen.

Hotchkis also made many guest appearances on TV shows such as Bewitched, St. Elsewhere, Lou Grant, Charlie's Angels, Mannix, Marcus Welby, Barnaby Jones, and more. On the big screen, she co-starred as Mama Hartley in the feature film Ode to Billy Joe (1976).

Hotchkis began writing original material in the 70s, beginning with a one-woman play, Legacy depicting an upper-class housewife having a mental and emotional breakdown. Eric Morris directed the play on stage; director Karen Arthur saw the play and approached Hotchkis proposing to make a film version, with Arthur as director and Hotchkis as writer, producer and star. The resulting film, Legacy (1975), won Best Newcomer at the Tehran Film Festival.

During the early 1980s, Hotchkis returned to the stage, performing for several years in regional theaters such as the Oregon Shakespeare Festival and Milwaukee Repertory Theater. She subsequently starred in The Glass Menagerie at Los Angeles Theater Center and did occasional television roles.

=== Tearsheets Productions ===
Beginning in the late 1980s, Hotchkis resumed writing original material, this time moving beyond legitimate theater into the performance art world. She founded the Santa Monica-based Tearsheets Productions and wrote, produced and performed two solo performance pieces. The first, Tearsheets: Rude Tales from the Ranch, toured the United States in the early 1990s and went abroad to the Edinburgh International Festival Fringe, where it was the only U.S. production to win a Fringe First Award. Her second solo work was Elements of Flesh: Or Screwing Saved My Ass (1996), about aging and sexuality.

== Personal life and death ==
Hotchkis married Robert Foster in June 1958. They met while filming a live commercial. Together, they had one child, Paula. They eventually divorced in 1967, and Hotchkis consequently returned to Los Angeles with Paula. Hotchkis' lifelong interest in psychology led her to eventually become a part-time paraprofessional in aggression training at the Institute of Group Psychotherapy (mentored by George Bach).

Hotchkis died on September 27, 2022, in Los Angeles. She was 95, and suffered from congestive heart failure prior to her death.

== Filmography ==
Joan Hotchkis's Filmography
Year	Title	Role
1971	The Late Liz	Sally Pearson
1973	Breezy	Paula Harmon
1975	Legacy	Bissie Hapgood
1976	Ode to Billy Joe	Anna 'Mama' Hartley
1979	Old Boyfriends	Pamela Shaw
1984	The Last Game	Cory's Mother
