= The Brothers (1956 TV series) =

American TV situation comedy series (1956–1957)

- Starring: Gale Gordon; Bob Sweeney; Barbara Billingsley; Ann Morriss
- Country of origin: United States
- No. of seasons: 1
- No. of episodes: 24

Production
- Running time: 30 minutes

Original release
- Network: CBS
- Release: October 2, 1956 – September 7, 1957

The Brothers is an American television sitcom broadcast by CBS from October 2, 1956, to March 26, 1957. Reruns of The Brothers were broadcast by CBS during the summer of 1958, alternating with repeats of Bachelor Father.

== Synopsis ==
The Brothers (original pilot title: The Box Brothers) was about the small adventures of the Box brothers, Gil and Harvey, who owned a photography studio in San Francisco. Harvey was the more aggressive, overbearing brother while Gil was a reserved, shy man who happily allowed his big brother to run things. Both of them had steady girlfriends who were matched to their personalities, Harvey's being the strong-willed, aggressive Dr. Margaret Kleeb and Gil's being the quiet, unassuming Marilee Dorf.

It was one of the first shows to have an unseen character. Andy, the darkroom person, was always heard but never seen.

== Cast ==
- Gale Gordon as Harvey Box
- Bob Sweeney as Gilmore "Gilly" Box
- Barbara Billingsley as Barbara
- Ann Morriss as Dr. Margaret Kleeb
- Nancy Hadley as Marilee Dorf
- Oliver Blake as Carl Dorf
- Robin Hughes as Barrington Steel
- Frank Orth and Howard McNear as Captain Sam Box
- Mary Lansing as Hazel
- Rodney Bell as Lester
- David Orrick as Roscoe Blinder

== Episodes ==
Ep #	Title	Airdate
1	"Gilly's Birthday"	October 2, 1956
2	"Dorf's Photo Machine"	October 9, 1956
3	"Renting the Attic"	October 16, 1956
4	"The Social Climber"	October 23, 1956
5	"The Class Reunion"	October 30, 1956
6	"The Quadrangle"	November 6, 1956
7	"Girls, Girls, Girls"	November 13, 1956
8	"Captain Sam's Testimonial Dinner"	November 20, 1956
9	"The Babies"	November 27, 1956
10	"The Other Harvey"	December 4, 1956
11	"Box Park"	December 18, 1956
12	"The Christmas Story"	December 25, 1956
13	"Gilly's Adventure"	January 1, 1957
14	"The Brave One"	January 8, 1957
15	"The Crush"	January 15, 1957
16	"Prisoners of Love"	January 22, 1957
17	"The Social Club"	January 29, 1957
18	"Gilly's Investment"	February 5, 1957
19	"Gilly and the Movie Star"	February 12, 1957
20	"Unwelcome Guest"	February 26, 1957
21	"Stop That Bookmaking Up Three"	March 5, 1957
22	"Picnic"	March 12, 1957
23	"A Muscle for Harvey"	March 19, 1957
24	"The Runaways"	March 26, 1957

== Production ==
The Brothers was a Dallad Productions and Desilu Studios product. Episodes were filmed in black-and-white with a live audience. Edward Feldman was the producer, and Hy Averback was one of the writers. Bill Davenport, Jim Fritzell, Al Lewin, and Burt Styler were among the writers. Wilbur Hatch provided music. Sponsors included American Tobacco Company, Lever Brothers, Procter & Gamble, and Shaeffer Fountain Pens. It was broadcast on Tuesdays at 8:30 p.m. Eastern Time.

== Critical response ==
After The Brothers went off the air, Feldman blamed critics for the cancellation. He said that prior to the series's debut advertising agencies, sponsors, and CBS all expected it to be a hit. "Then came the reviews on the first show", he said. "Most of the critics clobbered us, and overnight that enthusiasm of our original supporters vanished. Suddenly we were working in an atmosphere of failure."
