= House of Women =

1962 film by Crane Wilbur

- Directed by: Walter Doniger; Crane Wilbur (uncredited)
- Written by: Crane Wilbur
- Produced by: Bryan Foy
- Starring: Shirley Knight; Andrew Duggan; Constance Ford; Barbara Nichols; Margaret Hayes; Jeanne Cooper
- Cinematography: Harold E. Stine
- Edited by: Leo H. Shreve
- Music by: Howard Jackson
- Production company: Bryan Foy Productions
- Distributed by: Warner Bros. Pictures
- Release date: April 11, 1962
- Running time: 85 minutes
- Country: United States
- Language: English

House of Women (also known as Ladies of the Mob) is a 1962 American crime film directed and written by Crane Wilbur, starring Shirley Knight and Andrew Duggan. Walter Doniger, who was hired to direct the film, was fired and replaced by Wilbur 10 days into shooting.

== Plot ==
Erica Hayden is a young expectant mother wrongly implicated in a crime and sent to prison for five years. Erica learns that she must find a guardian for her daughter or her daughter will become a ward of the state. Frank Cole, the warden, becomes infatuated with Erica and effectively blocks her chances for parole.

When another inmate's child dies, the woman becomes deranged. Erica prevents a tragedy and earns the right to be freed to be with her daughter, and Warden Cole's unethical methods come to light.

== Cast ==
- Shirley Knight as Erica Hayden
- Andrew Duggan as Warden Frank Cole
- Constance Ford as Sophie Brice
- Barbara Nichols as Candy Kane
- Margaret Hayes as Zoe Stoughton
- Jeanne Cooper as Helen Jennings
- Virginia Gregg as Mrs. Hunter
- Patricia Huston as Doris
- Jason Evers as Dr. F.M. Conrad
- Jennifer Howard as Addie Gates
- Caroline Richter as Clemens
- Gayla Graves as Jackie
- Colette Jackson as Aggie
- Jacqueline Scott as Mrs. Stevens
- Paul Lambert as Richard Dunn
- Lyle Latell as Sam
- Jeanne Carmen as inmate

== Reception ==
The Monthly Film Bulletin wrote: "A plea for more humane treatment of unmarried mothers which veers from mawkish banality to hysterical violence. Shirley Knight is an irritatingly starry-eyed heroine, and Andrew Duggan can make nothing of the infatuated warden."

The Hollywood Reporter wrote: "House Of Women is a brisk and business-like prison melodrama with an unusual framework for a fairly usual setting, handled with taste, suspense and quite a bit of good character. Bryan Foy's production is modestly-budgeted by today's stratospheric standards, and will undoubtedly do well in the kind of dual bookings for which it was designed and executed."

Variety wrote: "Miss Knight gives a fragile, pure-as-the-driven-snow portrayal. Duggan is a composed, distracted villain. Among the flashier inmates, or cell block-busters, are Constance Ford as an anguished mother and Barbara Nichols as an ex-stripper with heart of gold, turned contented prisoner (she deesn't want out). ... Doniger's direction tends to be rather stilted and theatrical."
