= Scorching Fury =

1952 film

Scorching Fury is a 1952 American Western film. It stars Richard Devon, William Leslie and Sherwood Price and was written by Devon and James Craig.

== Plot ==
Scorching Fury is based around a stage holdup. After the robbery the gang leaves the passengers to die in the desert.
