= Frontier Uprising =

1961 film by Edward L. Cahn

- Directed by: Edward L. Cahn
- Screenplay by: Orville H. Hampton (as Owen Harris)
- Story by: George Bruce
- Produced by: Robert E. Kent
- Starring: Jim Davis; Nancy Hadley; Ken Mayer
- Cinematography: Maury Gertsman
- Edited by: Kenneth G. Crane (as Kenneth Crane)
- Music by: Paul Sawtell; Bert Shefter
- Production company: Zenith Pictures
- Distributed by: United Artists
- Release date: February 1961
- Running time: 68 minutes
- Country: United States
- Language: English

Frontier Uprising is a 1961 American Western film directed by Edward L. Cahn and starring Jim Davis, Nancy Hadley and Ken Mayer. It is a remake of Kit Carson (1940).

== Plot ==
Not having heard that war has erupted between the U.S. and Mexico, a wagon train heads west, only to find itself threatened by the Mexicans who have teamed up with hostile Indians.

== Cast ==
- Jim Davis as Jim Stockton
- Nancy Hadley as Consuela Montalvo
- Ken Mayer as Beaver McBride
- Nestor Paiva as Don Carlos Montalvo
- Don Kelly as 1st Lt. Kilpatrick (as Don O'Kelly)
- Eugene Iglesias as Lt. Felipe Ruiz (Mexican Army)
- Stuart Randall as Ben Wright
- John Marshall as Gen. Torena
- David Renard as Lopez
- Tudor Owen as Charley Bridger
- Renata Vanni as Augustina
- Addison Richards as Cmdr. Kimball
- Herman Rudin as Chief Taztay
- Jan Arvan as Toyon

== See also ==
- List of American films of 1961
