= The Gray Ghost (TV series) =

American Civil War TV series

- Genre: Western
- Created by: Lindsley Parsons
- Written by: Virgil Carrington Jones
- Directed by: Hollingsworth Morse
- Starring: Tod Andrews; Phil Chambers; Sherwood Price
- Theme music composer: William Paul Dunlap
- Opening theme: "The Gray Ghost"
- Composer: William Paul Dunlap
- Country of origin: United States
- Original language: English
- No. of seasons: 1
- No. of episodes: 39

Production
- Producer: Russell Hayden
- Running time: 22–24 minutes
- Production companies: CBS Television Film Sales; Lindsley Parsons Picture Corporation

Original release
- Network: Syndication
- Release: October 10, 1957 – July 9, 1958

The Gray Ghost is an American Civil War television series that debuted in syndication in 1957. The show is based upon the true story of Colonel John Singleton Mosby.

== Synopsis ==
The Gray Ghost stars Tod Andrews as Mosby, Phil Chambers as Sergeant Myles Magruder, and Sherwood Price in five episodes as General J.E.B. Stuart, also known for his cavalry skills. Recurring characters on the program were Donald Foster as Braddock, Jean Willes as Ansonia, Ralph Clanton as a general, Dick Jones as Ned Underwood, Otto Aldis as Mueller and John Banner as Major Heros von Borcke.

Gray Ghost was cancelled after one season of thirty-nine half-hour episodes. High production costs may have made the program too expensive to continue.

== Production ==
Lindsley Parsons created and produced The Gray Ghost, and Frank McDonald directed it. Jack DeWitt and Warren Douglas were writers. CBS Film Sales was the distributor. The book Gray Ghosts and Rebel Raiders by Virgil Carrington Jones formed the basis for the series, and Jones was technical advisor.

The trade publication Variety said, "National sponsors reportedly ran scared" of the program "because of the integration issue and the concomitant rise in sectional feelings." (The reference book The Complete Directory to Prime Time Network and Cable TV Shows 1946–Present says, "The series was originally intended for the CBS-TV network, but three times potential sponsors backed out.") Therefore the show was syndicated. The magazine's review of the premiere episode described it as "a romantic horse opera in a Civil War setting" that would be unlikely to "cause any rise in sectional feeling."

== Notable guest stars ==
- Ray Boyle ("Conscript")
- Peter Breck ("The Deserter")
- Richard Beymer ("An Eye for an Eye")
- Harry Carey, Jr. ("The Picnic")
- Russ Conway ("Judith")
- Dennis Cross ("Sealed Orders")
- Francis De Sales ("Charity")
- Angie Dickinson ("Point of Honor")
- Ann Doran ("Charity")
- Anthony Eisley ("The Trial")
- Ross Elliott ("The Rivals")
- Dabbs Greer ("Rebel Christmas")
- Kevin Hagen ("The Missing Colonel")
- Ron Hagerthy ("A Problem of Command")
- Richard Jaeckel ("The Manhunt")
- Sammy Jackson ("Resurrection")
- Robert Knapp ("Rebel Christmas")
- Charles Lane ("Secret and Urgent")
- Ruta Lee ("Contraband")
- Nan Leslie ("Conscript")
- Tyler MacDuff ("The Gallant Foe")
- Strother Martin ("Reconnaissance Mission")
- Walter Maslow ("The Humanitarian")
- Carole Mathews ("Greenback Raid")
- Denver Pyle ("Resurrection")
- Gloria Saunders ("The Angel of Loudoun")
- William Schallert ("Russell of 'The Times'")
- Karen Sharpe ("The Humanitarian")
- Liam Sullivan ("Point of Honor")
- Gloria Talbott ("Sealed Orders")

== Adaptations ==
Ray Bailey adapted the series into a comic strip.
