= Channing (TV series) =

American TV drama series (1963–1964)

- title card for Channing
- Also known as: The Young and the Bold
- Genre: Drama
- Written by: Theodore Apstein; Robert Kaufman; Ken Kolb
- Starring: Jason Evers; Henry Jones
- Composer: Jack Marshall
- Country of origin: United States
- Original language: English
- No. of seasons: 1
- No. of episodes: 26

Production
- Executive producer: Stanley Rubin
- Producer: Jack Laird
- Running time: 45–48 minutes
- Production company: Revue-Betford

Original release
- Network: ABC
- Release: September 18, 1963 – April 8, 1964

Channing (also known as The Young and the Bold) is an hour-long American drama series that aired on Wednesdays at 10:00 p.m. on ABC from September 18, 1963 to April 8, 1964.

== Overview ==
The series depicted life at fictitious Channing College, with Jason Evers in the lead role of Professor Joseph Howe, and Henry Jones as Fred Baker, the dean of the institution.

Channing, a production of Revue Studios, aired during the same time frame as the first season of NBC's somewhat similar offering, Mr. Novak.

== Cast ==
- Henry Jones as Dean Fred Baker
- Jason Evers as Professor Joseph Howe

Jones and Evers were the only regulars.

=== Notable guest stars ===
- Leo G. Carroll as Professor John Miller
- Yvonne Craig as Kathy O'Reardon
- Keir Dullea as Larry Franklin
- Joey Heatherton as Lynn Walton
- Leslie Nielsen as Professor Paul Stafford
- Suzanne Pleshette as Laurie Moore
- Marion Ross as Assistant Dean Ryker
- Dawn Wells as Nancy Kyle
- Joyce Bulifant
- James Caan
- John Cassavetes
- Michael Constantine
- Ellen Corby
- Noreen Corcoran
- Tim Conway
- Bob Crane
- Pete Duel
- Peter Fonda
- Mark Goddard
- Joan Hackett
- Barbara Harris
- Mariette Hartley
- Peter Helm
- Rafer Johnson
- James Earl Jones
- Susan Kohner
- Peggy McCay
- Ralph Meeker
- Agnes Moorehead
- Greg Morris
- Leela Naidu
- Ed Nelson
- Leslie Nielsen
- Michael Parks (two episodes as Dante Donati)
- Suzanne Pleshette
- Michael J. Pollard
- Denver Pyle
- Chris Robinson
- Telly Savalas
- George Segal
- William Shatner
- Tom Simcox
- Forrest Tucker
- Elen Willard

== Episodes ==
No.	Title	Directed by	Written by	Original release date
1	"Message from the Tin Room"	Harvey Hart	Lester Pine	September 18, 1963
2	"Exercise in a Shark Tank"	Harvey Hart	Story by : Sonya Roberts; Teleplay by : Steven W. Carabatsos and Jack Guss	September 25, 1963
3	"An Obelisk for Benny"	Eliot Silverstein	William Wood	October 2, 1963
4	"No Wild Games for Sophie"	William Hale	Stanford Whitmore	October 9, 1963
5	"Dragon in the Den"	Lawrence Dobkin	James Yaffe	October 23, 1963
6	"Potato Bash World"	Don Weis	Richard Fielder	October 30, 1963
7	"Collision Course"	Harvey Hart	Story by : Ellis Kadison; Teleplay by : Jack Guss and Ellis Kadison	November 6, 1963
8	"A Patron Saint for the Cargo Cult"	William Hale	David Rayfiel	November 13, 1963
9	"Beyond His Reach"	Ted Post	Juarez Roberts	November 27, 1963
10	"A Doll's House with Pompoms and Trophies"	William Hale	Robert Kaufman	December 4, 1963
11	"A Window on the War"	Herschel Daugherty	David Rayfiel	December 11, 1963
12	"The Last Testament of Buddy Crown"	Ron Winston	Story by : David Shaber; Teleplay by : Stanford Whitmore	December 18, 1963
13	"A Hall Full of Strangers"	Ralph Senensky	Theodore Apstein	December 25, 1963
14	"Memory of a Firing Squad"	David Lowell Rich	Sheldon Stark	January 1, 1964
15	"A Rich, Famous, Glamorous Folk Singer Like Me"	William Hale	George Kirgo	January 8, 1964
16	"Swing for the Moon"	Unknown	Unknown	January 15, 1964
17	"Another Kind of Music"	Elliot Silverstein	Story by : Marcus Demian; Teleplay by : Jack Laird	January 22, 1964
18	"Ou Sont Les Neiges...?"	Unknown	John T. Dugan	February 12, 1964
19	"The Face in the Sun"	Harvey Hart	Story by : Fred F. Finklehoffe; Teleplay by : Jack Guss and Fred F. Finklehoffe	February 19, 1964
20	"A Claim to Immortality"	Buzz Kulik	Theodore Apstein	February 26, 1964
21	"Freedom Is a Lovesome Thing God Wot"	Unknown	M. Charles Cohen and Edmund Morris	March 4, 1964
22	"The Trouble With Girls"	Alan Crosland Jr.	Ken Kolb	March 11, 1964
23	"Wave Goodbye to Our Fair-haired Boy"	David Alexander	Ken Kolb	March 18, 1964
24	"A Bang and a Whimper"	Allen H. Miner	Shimon Wincelberg	March 25, 1964
25	"Christmas Day Is Breaking Wan"	William Hale	William Wood	April 1, 1964
26	"My Son, the All-American"	William Hale	Robert Kaufman	April 8, 1964

== Production notes ==
Stanley Rubin was the executive producer; Jack Laird the producer, and Bob Rafelson, the associate producer. Directors included Harvey Hart. The program was produced by Byco Productions and filmed at Universal City.
