= Kathie Browne =

American actress (1930–2003)

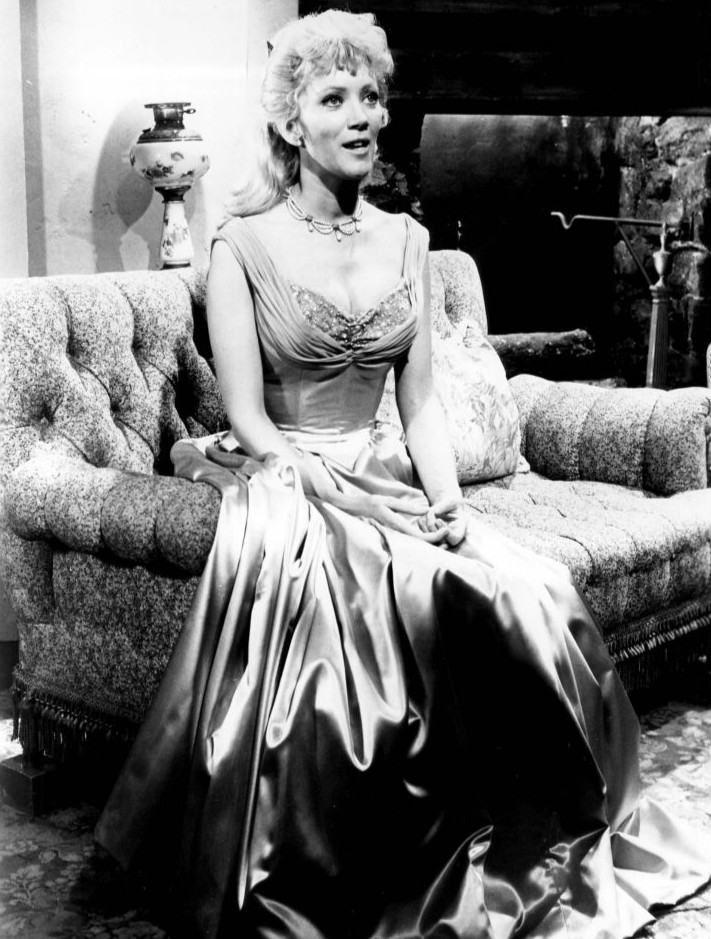
- Browne in Bonanza, 1963
- Born: Jacqueline Sue Browne; September 19, 1930; Humansville, Missouri, U.S.
- Died: April 8, 2003 (aged 72); Beverly Hills, California, U.S.
- Resting place: Forest Lawn Memorial Park (Hollywood Hills)
- Other names: Jacqueline Sue Gell; Cathy Browne; Jacqueline Price; Kathie McGavin; Kathie Browne–McGavin
- Occupation: Actress
- Years active: 1952–1980
- Spouses: Sherwood Price (m. 1953; div. 1961) Darren McGavin (m. 1969)

Jacqueline Sue "Kathie" Browne (September 19, 1930 – April 8, 2003) was an American stage, film, and television actress.

== Early life ==
Browne was born on September 19, 1930, in Humansville, Missouri, to Winn Roscoe Browne and Erma Mae Wood. Her family later moved to San Luis Obispo, California, then when she turned ten, to Los Angeles, where she went to city schools. She received her first social security card at age 13 during April 1943. (Note: Browne 's Social Security Administration file records the following name changes: Apr 1943: Jacqueline Sue Browne Jan 1956: Jacqueline Sue Gell May 1960: Cathy Browne Oct 1961: Kathie Browne Dec 1967: Jacqueline Price May 1971: Kathie McGavin) After high school, she studied drama at Los Angeles City College (LACC), where she won a best acting award.

== Tustin Playbox ==
May Rose Borum, a drama teacher at LACC, founded a community theatre called the Tustin Playbox in June 1952. As "Cathy Browne" (her first stage name; she does not appear to have used "Kathie Browne" until March 1959), Browne was active in this theater for many years, both as performer and co-producer with her first husband, Sherwood Price. (Note: Price's birth name was Frank Sherwood Gell; his early credits from 1948 were as Sherwood Gell, which he changed to Sherwood Price in 1952.)

== Career ==
In 1955, Browne's television acting career began with her appearance in one episode of Big Town. She appeared in many films and television series, including four roles on Perry Mason, as title character and defendant Donna Loring Ross in the 1960 episode "The Case of the Provocative Protégée"; as defendant Susan Fisher in the 1962 episode "The Case of the Mystified Miner"; as Carla Eden in the 1963 episode "The Case of the Festive Felon"; and as defendant Lona Upton in the 1965 episode "The Case of the Thermal Thief." In 1962, Browne appeared as Laurie Kemper on the TV Western Lawman in the episode titled "Heritage of Hate" and as Deela in the 1968 Star Trek episode "Wink of an Eye."

Other television series on which she appeared include:

- 77 Sunset Strip
- Banacek
- The Big Valley
- The Bold Ones: The Lawyers
- Bonanza
- Cade's County
- Coronado 9
- Fantasy Island
- The Farmer's Daughter (TV series)
- Get Smart
- Gomer Pyle, U.S.M.C.
- The Gray Ghost
- Gunsmoke
- Have Gun Will Travel
- Hawaiian Eye
- Hazel
- Hondo
- Ironside
- Laramie
- Longstreet
- The Man from Blackhawk
- Mannix
- My Favorite Martian
- Police Story
- The Real McCoys
- Redigo
- Ripcord
- The Rockford Files
- The Sheriff of Cochise
- Tales of Wells Fargo
- Tombstone Territory
- The Virginian
- Wagon Train
- Wanted Dead or Alive
- Whispering Smith
- The Wild Wild West

In 1975 Browne co-starred in the Kolchak: The Night Stalker episode "Sentry", in which her husband, Darren McGavin, starred. She played Chicago P.D. Lieutenant Irene Lamont.

== Personal life ==
As Jacqueline Sue Browne she married actor-producer Sherwood Price on November 22, 1953, at the Chapman Park Hotel in Los Angeles. She later married actor Darren McGavin in December 1969. The marriage ended with her death in 2003.

== Death ==
A breast cancer survivor, Browne died of natural causes on April 8, 2003, in Beverly Hills, California, at age 72. She is buried as Kathie Browne-McGavin at Forest Lawn Memorial Park (Hollywood Hills). McGavin, to whom she was married for 34 years, died in 2006 and was interred six miles away.

== Filmography ==
Year	Title	Role	Notes
1958	Murder by Contract	Mary – Secretary and Party Girl	
1958	City of Fear	Jeanne	
1960–1961	Sea Hunt	Eleana Dales / Kathryn Drayton / Suzie Kenyon	3 episodes
1960	Studs Lonigan	Wild Party Girl	Uncredited
1960	Perry Mason	Donna Loring Ross	Episode: The Case of the Provocative Protege
1960	Cinderfella		Uncredited
1960	Tales of Wells Fargo	Madeline	
1961–1964	Bonanza	Ellen Henry / Margie Owens / Laura Dayton	6 episodes
1961	Rawhide	Mary Donahoe	S3:E23, "Incident of the Phantom Bugler"
1961	Rawhide	Lily	S3:E30, "Incident of the Wager on Payday"
1961	Rawhide	Lily	S4:E4, "Judgement at Hondo Seco"
1962	Lawman	Laurie Kemper	Episode: Heritage of Hate
1962	The Underwater City	Dotty Steele	
1962	Perry Mason	Susan Fisher	Episode: The Case of the Mystified Miner
1962	Have Gun – Will Travel	Marie Ellis / Lydia Moss	2 episodes
1963	My Favorite Martian	Peaches	Episode: A Loaf of Bread, a Jug of Wine, and Peaches
1963	Perry Mason	Carla Eden	Episode: The Case of the Festive Felon
1964	Man's Favorite Sport?	Marcia	
1964	The Brass Bottle	Hazel Jenks	
1964	Alfred Hitchcock Hour	Mavis Maxwell	Episode: Bed of Roses
1965	Alfred Hitchcock Hour	Noreen Kimberly	Episode: Wally the Beard
1965	Brainstorm	Angie DeWitt	
1965	Perry Mason	Lona Upton	Episode: The Case of the Thermal Thief
1965	The Wild Wild West	Faith Cadwallader	Episode: The Night of the Human Trigger
1966	Branded	Jenny Galvin	Episode: Call to Glory parts 1, 2 and 3
1967	The Wild Wild West	Jennifer Caine	Episode: The Night of the Colonel's Ghost
1967	Hondo	Angie Dow	17 episodes
1968	Star Trek	Deela	S3:E11, Wink of an Eye
1970	Love, American Style	Ann Curtis	Episode: Love and the King
1972	43: The Richard Petty Story	Elizabeth	Richard Petty biography film
1973	Happy Mother's Day, Love George	Crystal	
1975	Kolchak: The Night Stalker	Lieutenant Irene Lamont	Episode: The Sentry
1975	The Rockford Files	Mayor Karen Sanders	S2:E11 Pastoria Prime Pick
1980	The Love Boat	Mary Ann Walker	Episode: The Family Plan/The Promoter/May the Best Man Win/Forever Engaged/The Judges: Part 1 and 2
