= Brad Trumbull =

American film, stage and television actor (1924–1994)

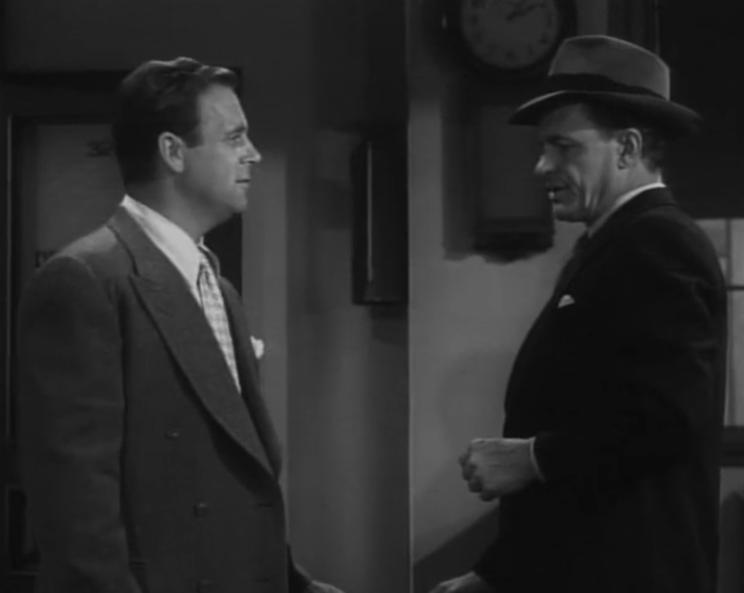
- Trumbull (left) with James Gregory in The Lawless Years, 1959
- Born: Brad Raymond Trumbull; November 25, 1924; Canoga Park, California, U.S.
- Died: November 25, 1994 (aged 70); Los Angeles, California, U.S.
- Occupations: Film, stage and television actor
- Years active: 1952–1988
- Spouse: Susanne Trumbull

Brad Raymond Trumbull (November 25, 1924 – November 25, 1994) was an American film, stage and television actor. He was known for playing the role of Brody in the American crime drama television series The Lawless Years.

After serving in the army during World War II, Trumbull studied at the Pasadena Playhouse, graduating in 1950. Trumbull began his career in 1952, as appearing in the television series Gang Busters. He guest-starred in television programs including Gunsmoke, One Day at a Time, Diff'rent Strokes, M*A*S*H, Mister Ed, The Golden Girls, Tales of Wells Fargo, The Andy Griffith Show, Mannix, The Doris Day Show and Highway Patrol.

Trumbull also appeared in over ninety episodes of the variety television series The Carol Burnett Show. He also appeared on the episode "Cellmates" of Mama's Family playing a police officer who gets assaulted by Eunice. He had a brief role playing Mr Mitchell in the episode "The Care and Feeding of Parents" as well as a non-speaking role in the episode "Edie Gets Married" on The Mary Tyler Moore Show playing Edie's new husband, Howard Gordon.

Trumbull died in November 25, 1994 of heart failure in Los Angeles, California on his 70th birthday.
