= Ray Bradbury Center =

Archive in Indianapolis, Indiana, US

Coordinates: 39.7738°N 86.1751°W

- Ray Bradbury Center
- Founded: 2007
- Founders: Jonathan R. Eller; William F. Touponce
- Type: Public non-profit
- Purpose: "The mission of the Bradbury Center is to fully document, preserve, and provide public access to its large and diverse collection of Space-Age visionary author Ray Bradbury’s literary works, art, artifacts, personal office, personal library, correspondence, typescripts, manuscripts, photographs, mementoes, audiovisual materials and juvenilia; to enable visiting scholars and students to conduct research; to continue its outreach programming in the Indianapolis community, throughout Indiana, nationally, and internationally, with an emphasis on reaching high school teachers, students, and librarians; and to continue publishing our annual scholarly journal The New Ray Bradbury Review."
- Headquarters: Indianapolis, Indiana
- Services: Research, outreach, publishing
- Director: Jason Aukerman
- Assistant Director: Carrie Cooper
- Key people: Nancy Orem; Max Goller; Kylie Adkins
- Parent organization: School of Liberal Arts, Indiana University Indianapolis
- Website: liberalarts.indianapolis.iu.edu/centers/bradbury-center/
- Formerly called: Center for Ray Bradbury Studies

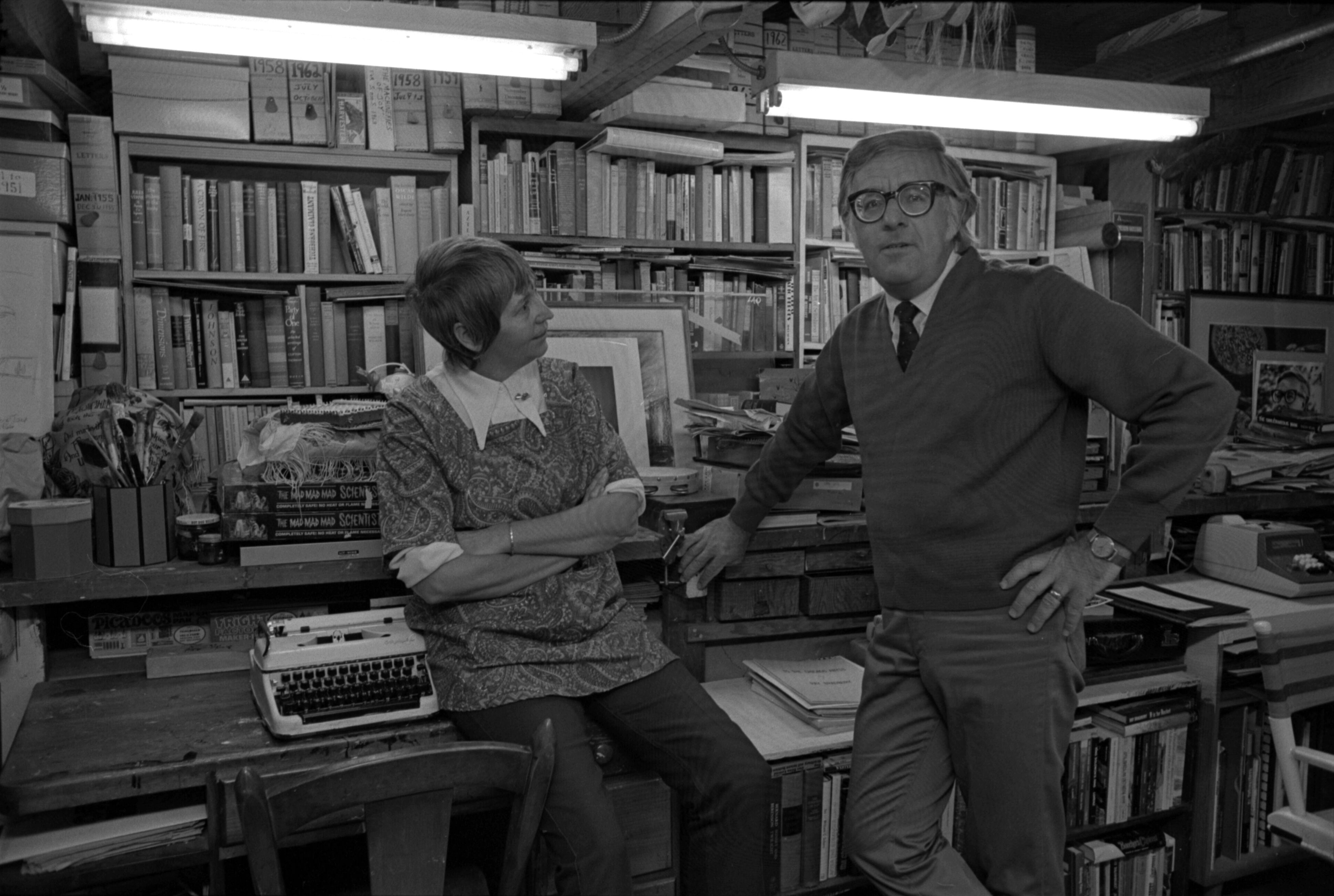
Bradbury and his wife, Maggie, shown in his Los Angeles home office in 1970

The Ray Bradbury Center is a publicly accessible, single author archive in the US dedicated to scholarship on the work of American author and screenwriter Ray Bradbury. It is located in Robert E. Cavanaugh Hall on the campus of the Indiana University Indianapolis (IUI) in Indianapolis, Indiana. The center is home to more than 100,000 pages of published and unpublished literary works stored in thirty-one of the author's filing cabinets; forty years of Bradbury's personal and professional correspondence (an additional 10,000 pages); and author's copies of Bradbury books, including extensive foreign language editions, and his working library (a combined 4000 volumes).

== History ==
The center was founded in 2007 by Bradbury scholars Jonathan R. Eller and William F. Touponce. Eller had met and befriended Bradbury while teaching at the United States Air Force Academy, which was hosting a science fiction conference. In 1993, Eller relocated to what was then Indiana University–Purdue University Indianapolis to teach, where Touponce was already on the faculty. In 2007, with material support from Bradbury's principal bibliographer Donn Albright that had begun the 1980s, Eller and Touponce persuaded the university to establish the then Center for Ray Bradbury Studies in order to help preserve Bradbury's legacy and to bring his life and work into the literary and academic mainstream.

When Bradbury died, in 2012, Albright, to whom Bradbury had bequested hundreds of his books and thousands of pages of his manuscripts and related materials, passed on much of his bequest to the center. This led the Bradbury family to gift their father's office and a lifetime of his awards and mementos to the center as well. The Center subsequently received over 18,000 pounds of artifacts, shipped from Bradbury's home in Los Angeles.

The Center occupies a 4400 square foot perimeter within which is a 1500 square foot secure perimeter. The Center functions as an archival processing facility, research center, and conference center. It includes a recreation of Ray Bradbury's basement office from his home in Los Angeles, with entirely original artifacts.

== Collections ==
The center has recreated Bradbury's basement office as it evolved in his home in Los Angeles, including original furniture such as his writing desk, paint table, bookshelves, and chairs. Also housed are thirty-one of the author's filing cabinets (holding 130,000 pages of documents), forty years of his personal and professional correspondence, extensive foreign language editions of his works in forty languages, and his working library (a combined 4,000 volumes).

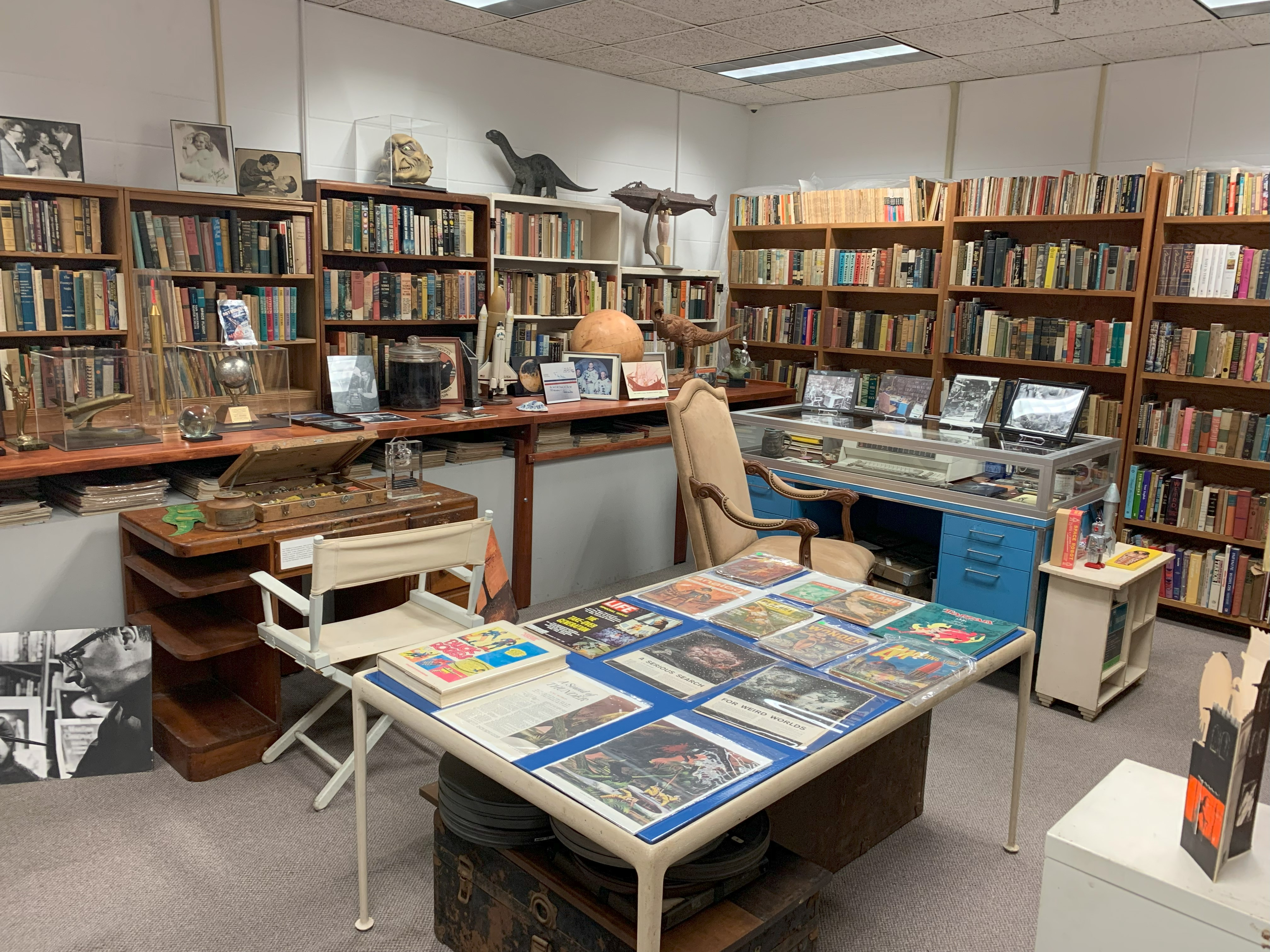
Recreated office

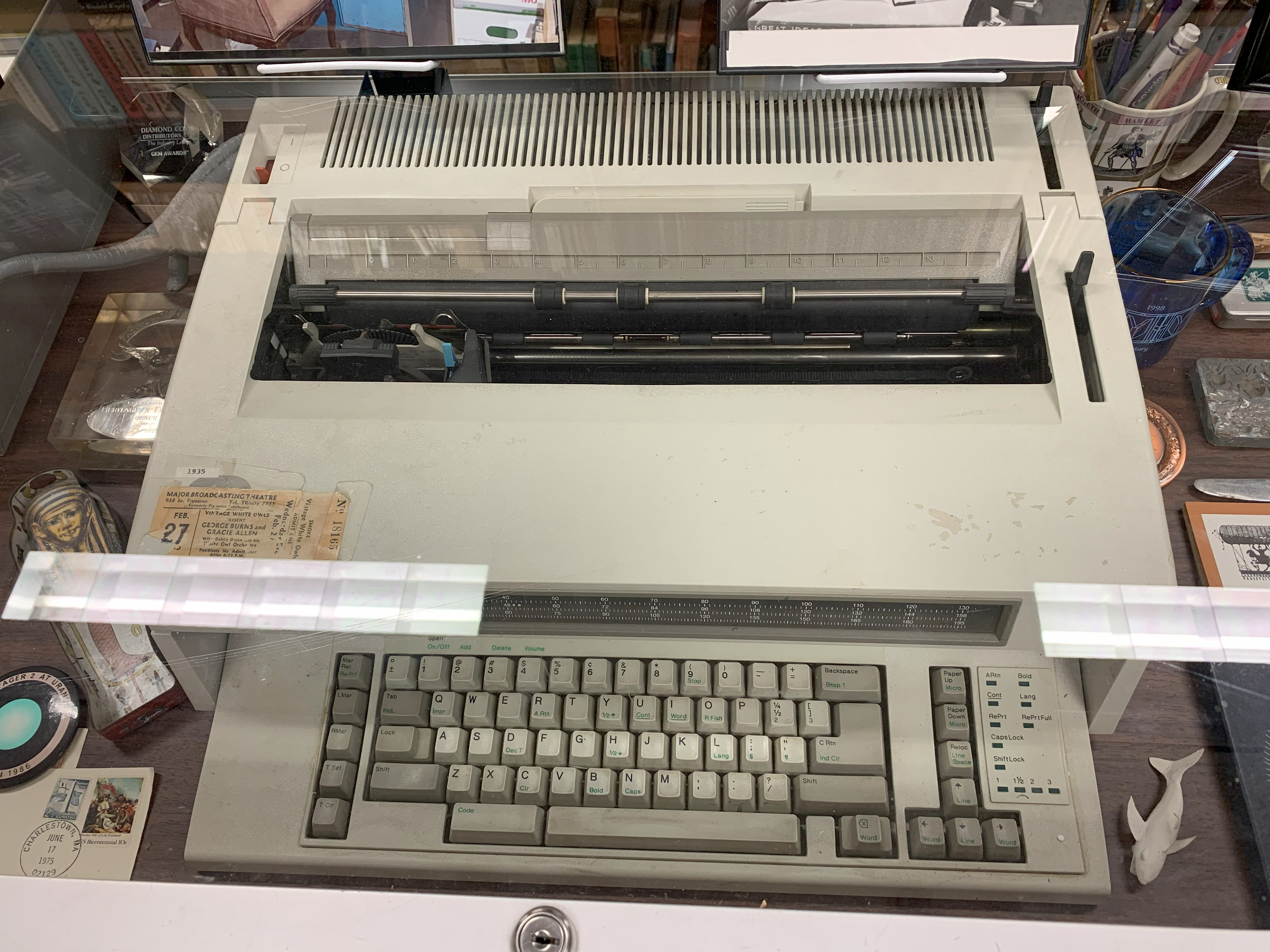
Bradbury's typewriter

Highlights among the broader collection of papers and artifacts include a number of national awards; a Mars flag that rode in the Space Shuttle Discovery; a replica of the Nautilus from the 1954 Walt Disney production of Jules Verne’s Twenty Thousand Leagues Under the Seas, sculpted by Disney Imagineers and gifted to Bradbury in the 1960s; the prop jar used in the Alfred Hitchcock Hour adaptation of Bradbury's short story "The Jar;" and an asbestos-bound edition of Fahrenheit 451. The awards held at the center include four of Bradbury's five Hugo Awards, his Daytime Emmy for The Halloween Tree, his Pulitzer Prize Special Citation, and his National Medal of Arts

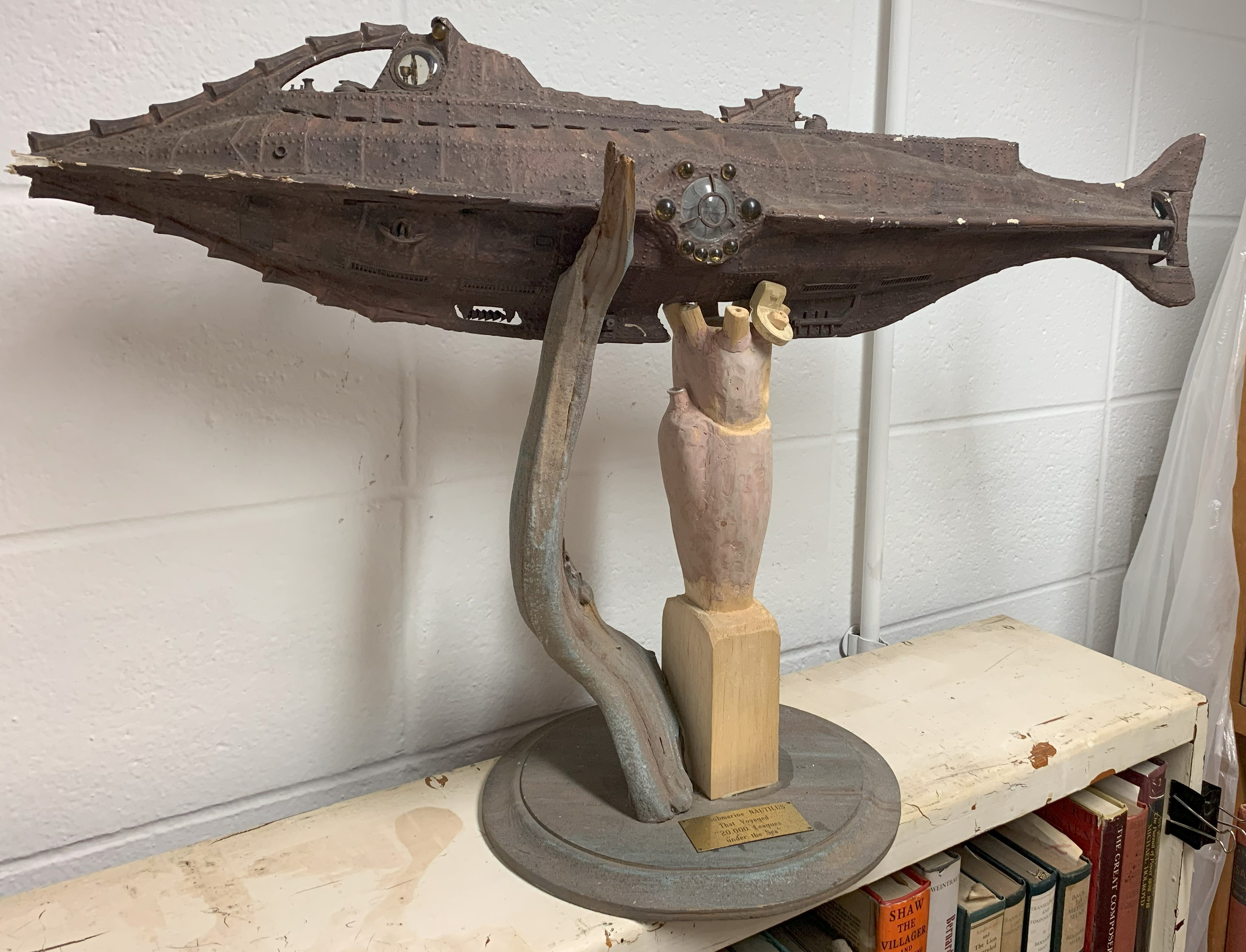
Model of the Nautilus

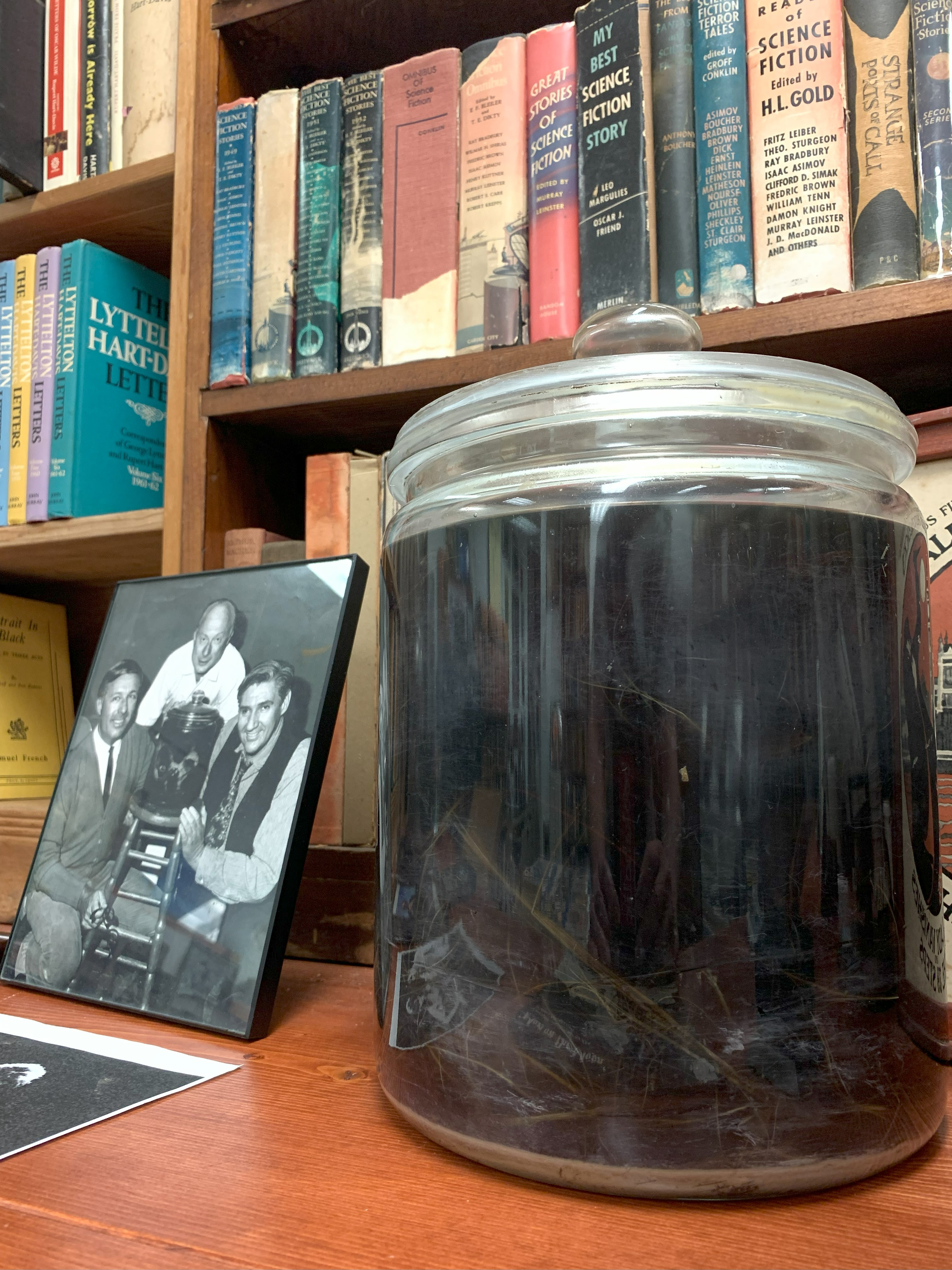
The Jar

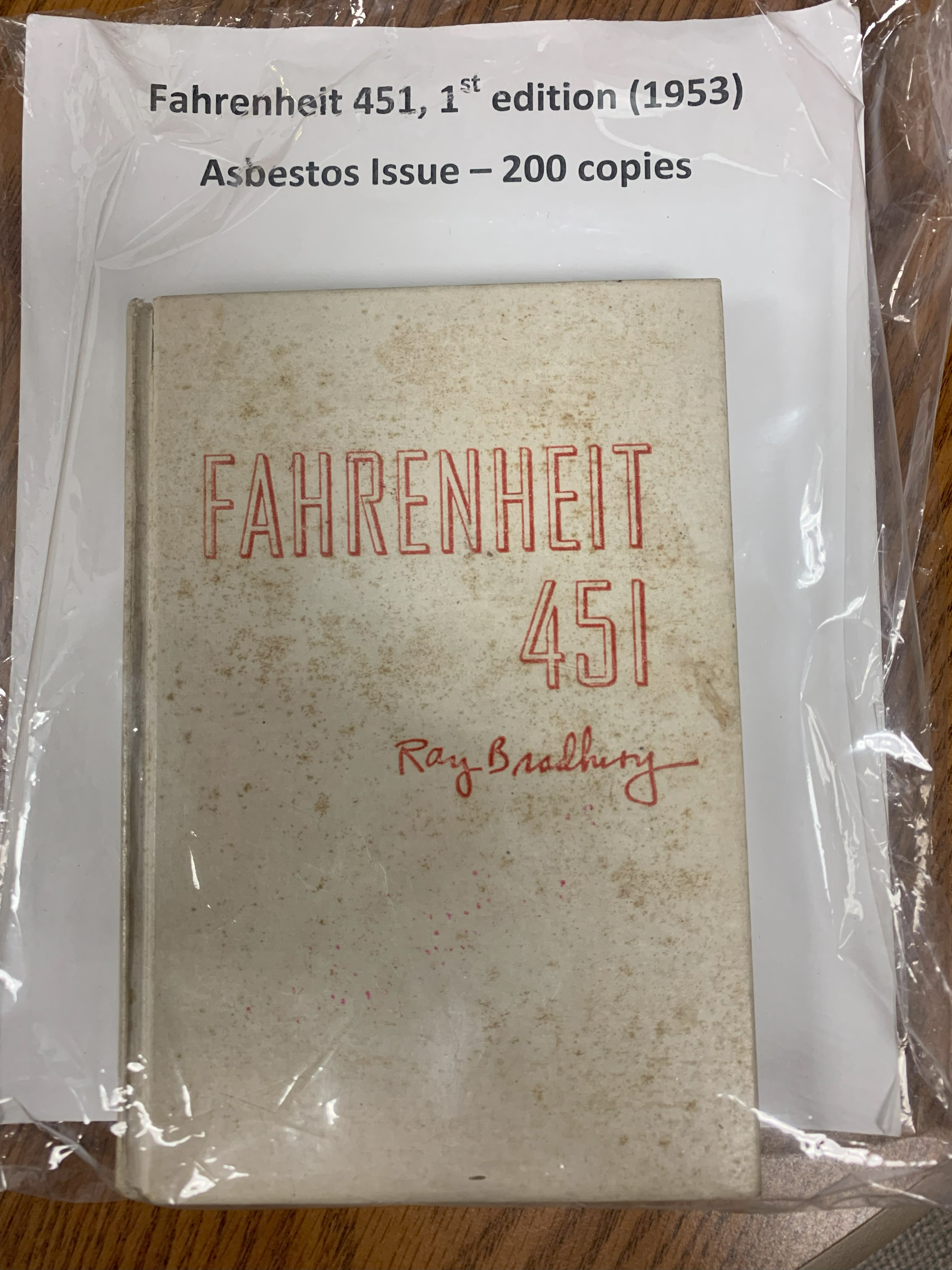
Asbestos-bound Fahrenheit 451
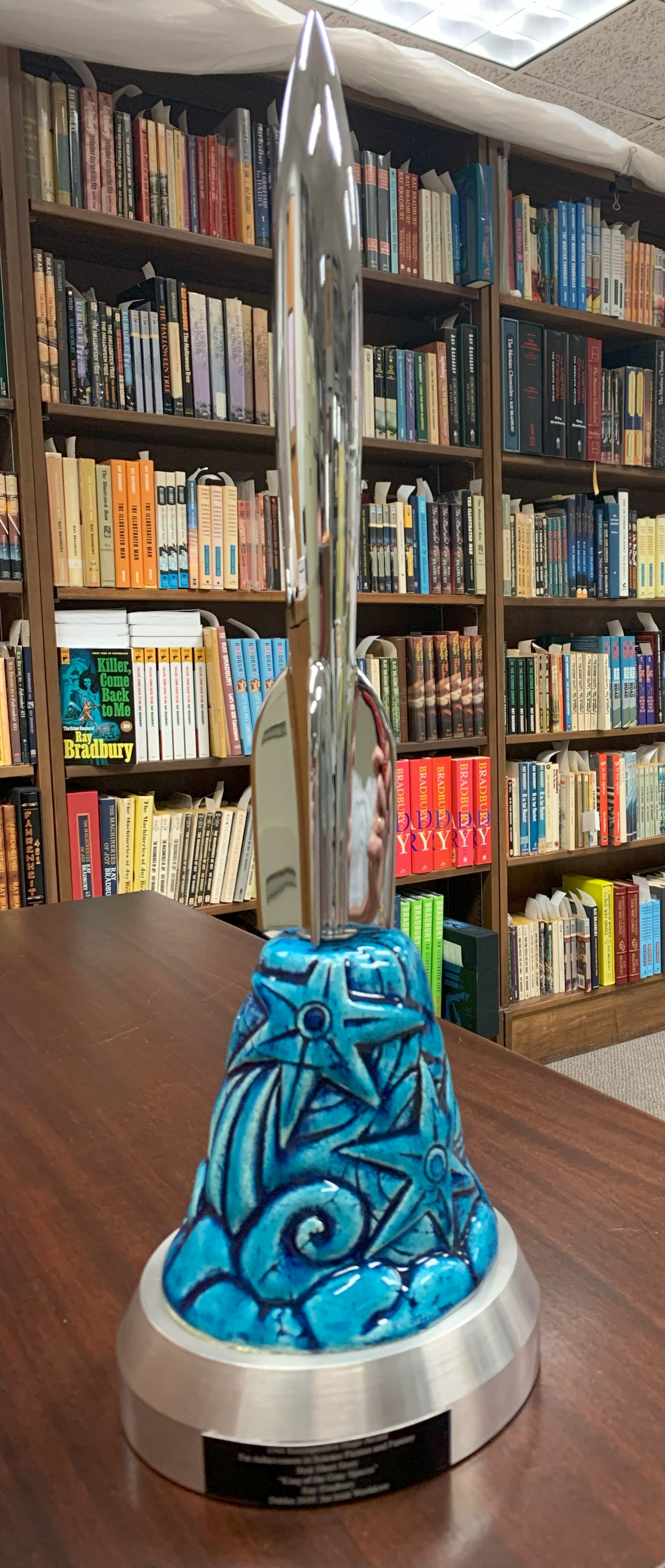
One of five Hugos

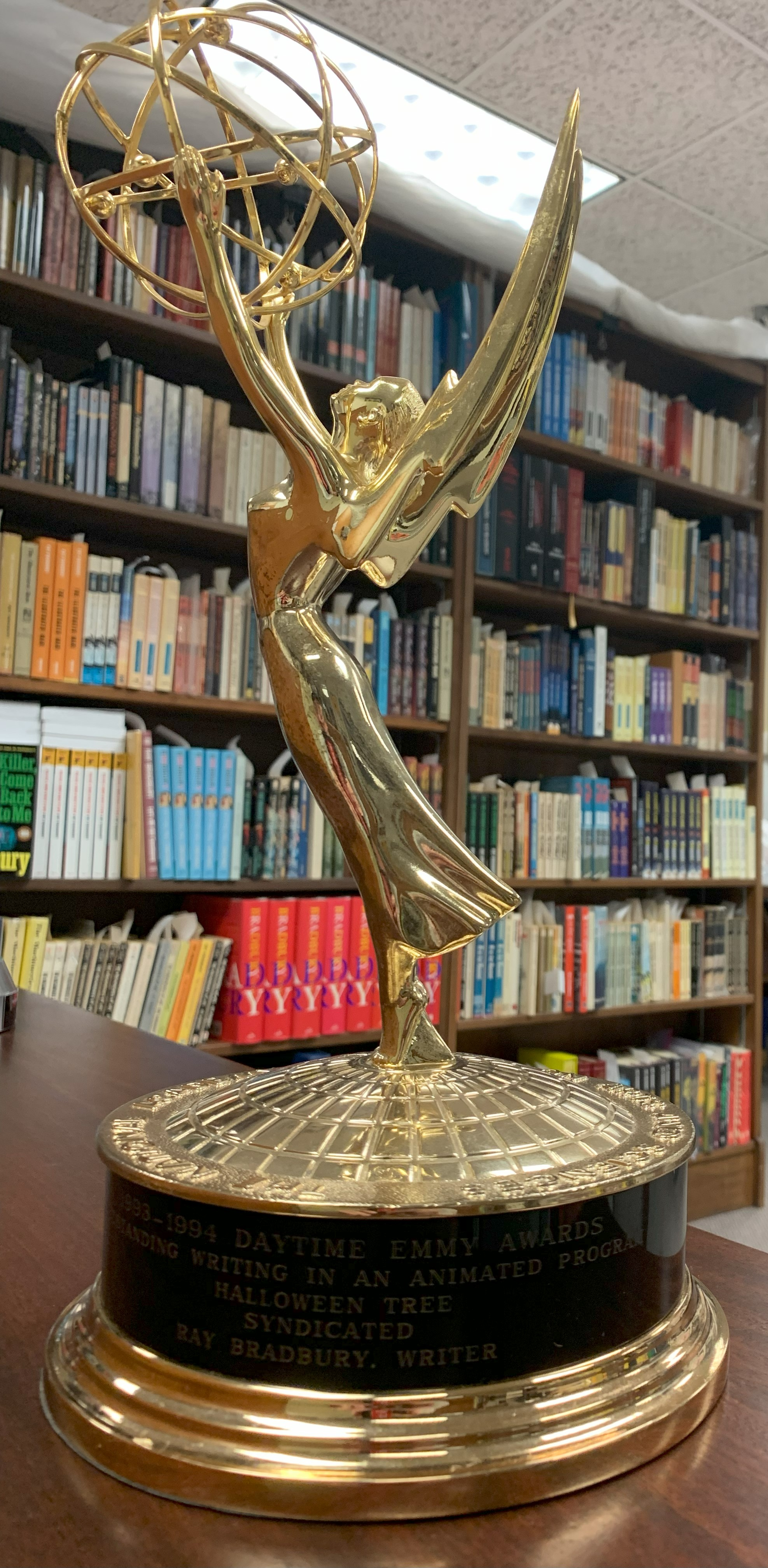
Daytime Emmy Award

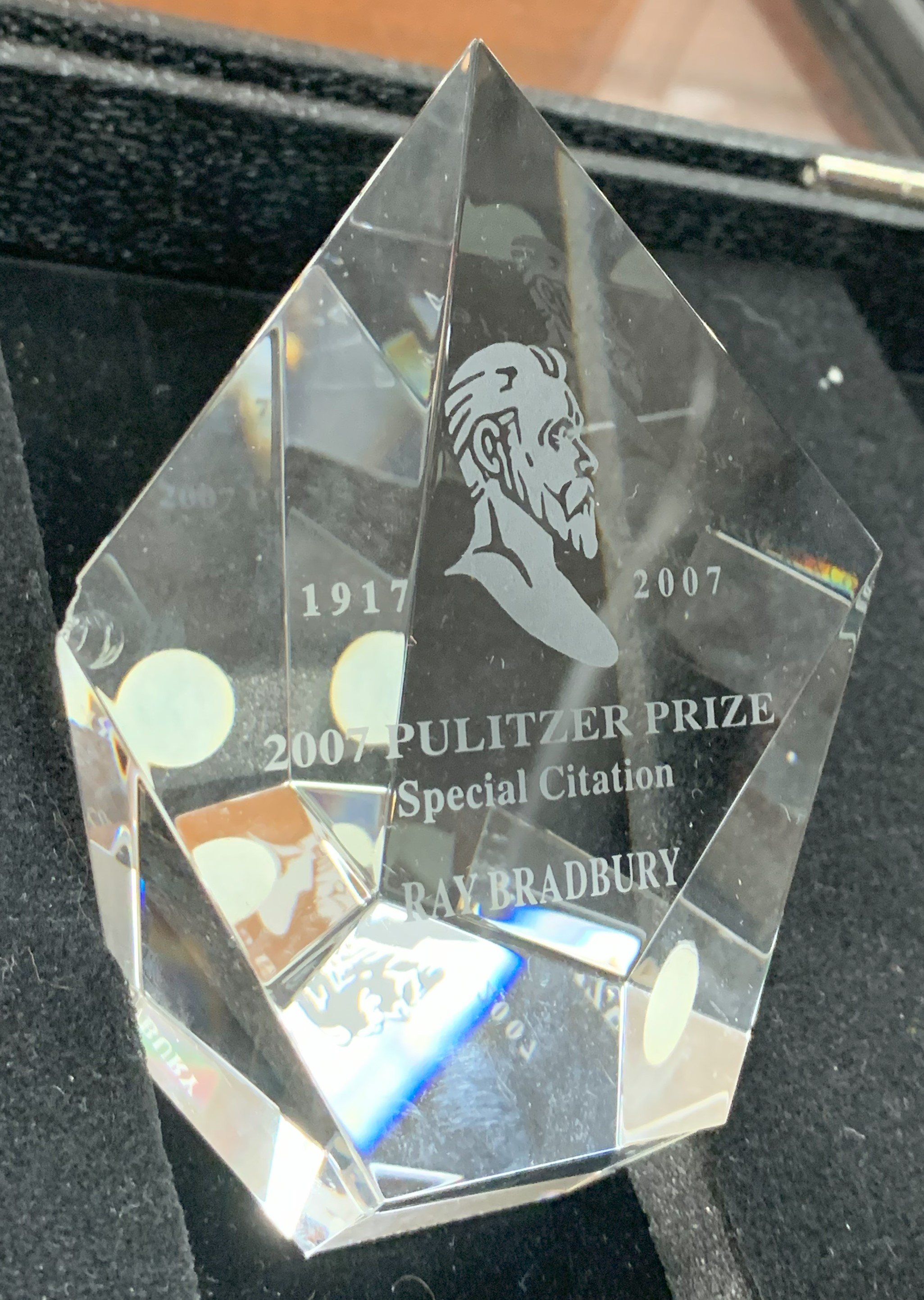
Pulitzer Prize Special Citation (2007)

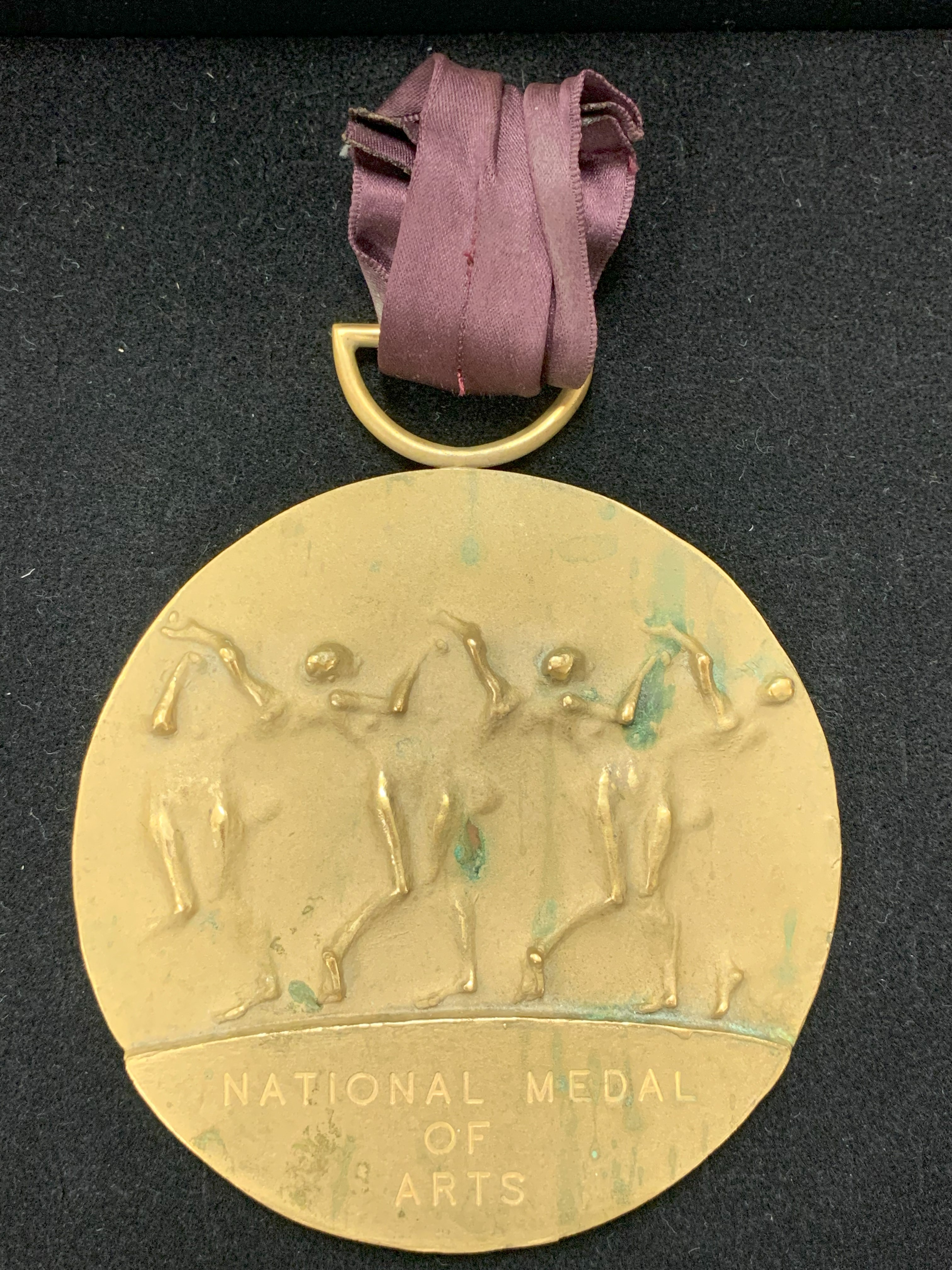
National Medal of Arts

== The New Ray Bradbury Review ==
In 1952, William F. Nolan published what stands as a predecessor to the current Review, a one-volume Ray Bradbury Review, which included articles, stories, book reviews, and an index of Bradbury's work. The New Ray Bradbury Review is the central publication of the center, having been established in 2008 and edited by William Touponce. It has a broad scope and is designed primarily to study the impact of Ray Bradbury's writings on American culture. Over its run it has also been edited by Jonathan Eller and Bradbury scholar Phil Nichols, who also hosts the Bradbury 100 podcast and Bradbury 101 video series.

Volumes 1–6, from 2008 to 2019, were published by Kent State University Press. As of volume 7 (2023), it has moved to an open access online format, edited by Nichols.

== Festival 451indy ==
Festival 451indy, organized by the center, is an annual celebration of the humanities intended to encourage lifelong learning through a variety of public programs, collaborative workshops, performances, and other events throughout Indianapolis. In 2024, for example, the festival included such events as a multi-lingual read-aloud on the theme of "Here There Be Monsters"; a film screening of 1953's The Beast from 20,000 Fathoms, based on Bradbury's 1951 short story, "The Fog Horn"; and a writer's lecture with Daniel Kraus.

== See also ==
- List of attractions and events in Indianapolis
- List of museums in Indiana
