= The Alfred Hitchcock Hour season 9 =

The Alfred Hitchcock Hour, known as Alfred Hitchcock Presents from 1955 to 1962 (seasons 1–7), aired 32 episodes during its ninth season from 1963 to 1964.

== Episodes ==
No. overall	No. in season	Title	Directed by	Written by	Stars	Original release date
301	1	"A Home Away from Home"	Herschel Daugherty	Robert Bloch	Ray Milland as Dr. Howard Fenwick	September 27, 1963
A patient at a mental institution does a role reversal by imprisoning the doctors. At Norton Sanatorium, patient Sarah Sanders (Kay) entertains Dr. Howard Fenwick (Milland) with her past life in entertainment when attendant Andrew (Leeds) mentions the arrival of Howard's wife Ruth (LaRoche), who is surprised at the role that patient Howard is playing at the institution. Ruth meets with Dr. Norton (Wright) to discuss whether Howard can be released anytime soon, as he is desperate to leave. After Norton says no and she leaves, Howard takes Norton's eyeglasses and breaks them before strangling Norton. Howard then pretends to be Norton when Norton's niece, Natalie Rivers (Griswold), calls about a visitation. The next day, Major Hart (Long) and Miss Gibson (Gregg) surprise Sarah with the revelation that Norton has left the institution and Howard is now in charge. Martha (Gilchrist) fixes the meal while Howard welcomes Natalie, and they discuss psychotherapy. When Natalie starts to look for Sarah's food in the dumbwaiter, as Andrew has failed to bring it, she hears a man yell for help upstairs. Upon looking upstairs, she is surprised by Andrew (Leeds), who is being locked up by Howard and Gibson, and who begs for her help. Gibson then takes Natalie downstairs for dinner, claiming that he is a dangerous patient. After dinner, Howard and Natalie speak when Major and Donald (Brooks) enter. Nicky Long (Searl) then comes in the study, as Donald has stolen his watch and wine decanter. Sarah, who claims to have been pregnant for the past five years, again inquires with Natalie about her dinner, so Sarah pulls up the dumbwaiter, only to discover Norton's body. Inspector Roberts (Dillon) is called to investigate, but Norton's body is missing. Natalie returns to her room, but she finds that the key fails to lock the door. She goes to Norton's office to talk to Howard and finds Norton's body inside his desk instead. Roberts and Howard then enter, with the two informing Natalie that Roberts is only pretending to be an inspector, as the others are only pretending to do their roles as well. After they leave, Major tells Natalie that Howard is a longtime patient who murdered his wife. After finding a telephone that has been disconnected, Natalie goes to speak with Andrew, who recommends that she find Sarah for help. She goes to Sarah's room to find that Donald has stolen the keys from Norton's study, and Sarah convinces Donald to give Natalie the keys. Howard goes to look for Natalie, finding her upstairs, and he attacks her. Just then, the real police (Peel) burst into the room, as Roberts had called them. Howard had told him to act as a real inspector, after all. Supporting Cast: Mary LaRoche as Ruth Fenwick, Beatrice Kay as Sarah Sanders, Ben Wright as Dr. Jerry Norton, Virginia Gregg as Miss Gibson, Ronald Long as Major Hart, Peter Leeds as Andrew, Connie Gilchrist as Martha, Jackie Searl as Nicky Long, Claire Griswold as Natalie Rivers, Peter Brooks as Donald, Brendan Dillon as "Inspector" Roberts, Richard Peel as First Officer
302	2	"A Nice Touch"	Joseph Pevney	Mann Rubin	Anne Baxter as Janice Brandt, George Segal as Larry Duke	October 4, 1963
A woman, Janice Brandt (Baxter), is caught between her drunken husband, Ed (Townes), and her determined lover, actor Larry Duke (Segal). Janice, a casting edit in New York City, calls Larry, out in Los Angeles, after her estranged husband shows up at her home and attacks her, though he soon passes out. While talking, they flash back to when they met at a casting audition, after the receptionist (Dillard) takes a call from Ed. After another actor (Stuart) is chosen to audition first, determined Larry forces his way into a doomed audition with executive Mr. Roberts (King), which greatly entertains Janice. His horrid audition is even interrupted by Roberts' secretary (Stewart), so Roberts cuts it short. After his rejection, he follows Janice and asks her out, as well as picking her up after she stumbles and hurts her ankle. Back in their present conversation, Larry suggests that Janice kills Ed while he lies unconscious. They flash back again to revisit how Larry seduced Janice at her home after the failed audition and her ankle injury; the two of them promised each other that there was no turning back. Janice begs Larry not to make her kill Ed, and she even tries to wake up Ed, but Larry presses her to either smother Ed with a gifted pillow (from Larry to Janice) or forget about their relationship altogether. Janice had received the pillow after being fired for sabotaging a casting performance for Larry. Janice smothers Ed, and Larry instructs her how to wrap the body in a blanket and dump it discreetly. After they hang up the phone, Larry calls the Los Angeles Police Department and tells them about Janice murdering Ed. Larry then goes back to bed, where his new wife Darlene (Holt) is waiting. Supporting Cast: Harry Townes as Ed Brandt, Charlene Holt as Darlene Vance, Walter Woolf King as Mr. Roberts the Executive, Mimi Dillard as Mimi the Receptionist, Martha Stewart as Secretary, Gilchrist Stuart as Actor
303	3	"Terror at Northfield"	Harvey Hart	Leigh Brackett (teleplay); Ellery Queen (story)	Dick York as Sheriff Will Pearce, Jacqueline Scott as Susan Marsh, R.G. Armstrong as John Cooley	October 11, 1963
The residents of a small town, Northfield, demand the investigation of a boy's death. Sheriff Will Pearce (York) and Susan Marsh (Scott) arrive at the home of John Cooley (Armstrong) to speak with John's son Tommy, but John reports that Tommy has left the area without any word. Susan believes that Tommy fled because of his mother, who is presumed dead but who Susan believes is still alive. Back in town, Susan speaks with librarian Flora Sloan (Flynn), who sold her a rundown car, and they discuss the Cooleys. Meanwhile, a body is found outside of town, with resident Frenchy La Font (Patrick) trying to handle the prying townsfolk. John Cooley finds a piece of glass and pretends to find his son's button while Dr. Buxton (Conway) reviews the body. The mayor, Sanford Brown (Harvey), demands answers from Sheriff Pearce, while John sneaks away to match the piece of broken glass to Susan's car's headlight. The next day, Frenchy stops by John's to discuss buying the Cooley family farm, but John attacks and knocks out Frenchy, dumping his body near the spot where Tommy's body was found. A councilman (Antrim) excitedly informs Susan of the body's discovery the next day, while multiple townspeople (Carroll, Pope, Bokar) react fearfully and with paranoia. Sheriff Pearce interviews Mrs. La Font (Squire) about Frenchy's whereabouts the day of his murder. John visits the grocer (Boles) before skulking around the town at night. At the library, Flora discusses her fears with Susan about being out at night, and Flora leaves Susan alone when Bib Hadley (Whitney), the custodian, uses his spare key to enter, scaring Susan with both his arrival and his talk of enjoying killing animals while working in a slaughterhouse. She flees outside only to run into Sheriff Pearce, who confronts Bib at gunpoint and detains him for questioning. Meanwhile, John stops by Flora's home to ask her about Tommy, and she passes out when he mentions killing Frenchy; Flora is later found dead. Mayor Brown calls a town meeting to discuss the situation, with residents Mr. Smith (O'Byrne), Mr. Jones (Newell), Mr. Brown (Reiner), and Mrs. Hayes (Bonney) relating their shared fear. As some residents want to form a citizens' patrol, such as Sam Hughes (Guth) and Fred (Raven), Mrs. La Font reveals a letter determining that Frenchy killed Tommy in a car accident. Deputy Ben (Bancroft) and Sheriff Pearce run to find Susan and John, while John lures Susan to the spot where Tommy was found. When she arrives, John attacks Susan just as the Sheriff Pearce and Ben arrive to save her. Sheriff Pearce reveals to Susan that Frenchy killed Tommy with her car before he had sold it to Flora, who had then sold it to Susan. Supporting Cast: Peter Whitney as Bib Hadley, Dennis Patrick as Frenchy La Font, Gertrude Flynn as Flora Sloan, Curt Conway as Dr. Buxton, Harry Harvey Sr. as Mayor Sanford Brown, Raymond Guth as Sam Hughes, Katherine Squire as Mrs. La Font, Bryan O'Byrne as Mr. Smith, William Newell as Mr. Jones, Gail Bonney as Mrs. Hayes, Robert Reiner as Mr. Brown, Harry Antrim as Councilman, Jim Boles as Grocer, Dee Carroll as Woman, Hinton Pope as Man, Hal Bokar as Man, Benje Bancroft as Deputy Ben (uncredited), Harry Raven as Townsman Fred (uncredited)
304	4	"You'll Be the Death of Me"	Robert Douglas	William D. Gordon (teleplay); Anthony Gilbert (story)	Robert Loggia as 'Driver' Arthur	October 18, 1963
A newlywed bride becomes suspicious of her husband when she finds a button belonging to a young woman who died not far from their mountain cabin. Korean War veteran 'Driver' Arthur (Loggia) stops by the Blackbird tavern to have a drink, while locals Tompy Dill (Smith), Kyle Sawyer (Leavitt), Bette Rose Calder (Phillips), and the bartender (Edwards) shoot the breeze. He is followed and watched by mute Ruby McCleod (Blake), who Bette Rose tries to run off. When Driver leaves, Bette Rose follows him to the nearby creek, where they argue about her not waiting while he served in uniform and threatening to inform his wife of their relationship. Driver strangles Bette Rose before he realizes what he is doing. At his mountain cabin, Driver's wife Mickey (Seurat) worries when a thunderstorm hits and Driver returns home late. That night, while putting away his jacket, she finds a button from Bette Rose's clothing. The next day, policeman Garfield Newton (Atwater) visits Mickey to ask about Bette Rose, who was found near the cabin, and anyone who she might have seen nearby. After he leaves, Mickey and dog Rex take a walk, with the two running into Ruby, who loves Rex, and they travel to McCleod's store for milk. Ruby's mother (Freeman) operates the family farm business, and she reveals that Ruby found Bette Rose, who writes that Bette Rose was pretty but evil, and they mention a missing button, which panics Mickey. Mickey returns home to find Driver waiting, who confronts her with the button. Driver states that he found the button and is very sensitive to her about it, but he agrees to talk to Gar Newton about it. The two of them take Rex for a walk to see Gar, but Driver backtracks and throws the button on the ground. Mickey confronts Driver with her suspicion that he killed Bette Rose, and he tells her that he had no other choice but to kill Bette Rose for Mickey. He pleads with her to stay with him, as he will otherwise be hanged. Driver strangles Mickey to quieten her before returning to the cabin. Just as he arrives, Gar Newton shows up, and after Driver claims that Mickey has not come home, the two go to the McCleod's to look for Mickey. Gar calls for a search party, and they find Mickey's body. Doctor Chalmont (Seel) offers to handle Mickey's arrangements for Driver. Ruby notices that Driver possesses Rex's chain that Mickey had earlier, so Gar questions how Driver has the chain if he had not seen Mickey. Ruby hurriedly writes that he, Driver, must have killed her, and Driver defeatedly drops the chain to the floor. Supporting Cast: Pilar Seurat as Mickey Arthur, Hal Smith as Tompy Dill, Norman Leavitt as Kyle Sawyer, Kathleen Freeman as Mrs. McCleod, Charles Seel as Doctor Chalmont, Barry Atwater (credited as G.B. Atwater) as Policeman Garfield 'Gar' Newton, Carmen Phillips as Bette Rose Calder, Sondra Blake (credited as Sondra Kerr) as Ruby McCleod, Sam Edwards as Bartender
305	5	"Blood Bargain"	Bernard Girard	Henry Slesar	Richard Kiley as Jim Derry, Richard Long as Eddie Breech, Anne Francis as Connie Breech	October 25, 1963
A contract assassin meets his target's handicapped wife. Earl (Call) and assassin Jim Derry (Kiley) visit Rupert Harney (Martin), who wants bookie Eddie Breech (Long) killed for stealing from his crime business. They follow Eddie, who takes his handicapped wife Connie (Francis) out to eat. She catches Derry's eye, especially after he finds out that Eddie crippled his wife by knocking her down a flight of stairs in a rage. When the cocktail waitress (Holliday) informs Eddie of a phone call for him, Derry leaves the bartender (Bellin) to take the opportunity to talk to Connie. Days later, Derry waits in Eddie's car, putting a gun in Eddie's face and demanding what Eddie is doing to help Connie. Derry forces Eddie to take him to see Connie, and Derry admits the truth of the situation to Connie. Connie convinces Derry to try to resolve the situation somehow, so Derry calls Figaro (Brocco), who runs a mortuary, in order to purchase a corpse. When Derry goes to see Eddie again, he has left the apartment, so Derry and Connie speak of her accident and depressive state. When Eddie returns, Derry takes his jewelry, car, and $1000 to stage Eddie's death and thereby fool Harney, but Derry leaves his revolver with Eddie for protection. Derry goes home and is met by Earl, who mentions Harney's annoyance at the deed not yet being done, and Derry assaults Earl to put him in his place. Derry then collects the corpse and stages an explosive car accident before collecting the $3000 bounty from Harney. After leaving, Derry is arrested by a detective (Duncan) and questioned by Lieutenant Geer (Elliott) at the police station. Geer plays a recording of Earl, who had just been arrested for an old charge, informing on him and Harney. Derry confesses everything to Geer, including his pity for Connie. Geer tells Derry that Eddie has been cheating on Connie for a considerable amount of time, which is why they fought. Geer reveals that Eddie has been shot and killed with Derry's gun before bringing in Connie, who tells Geer that Derry killed Eddie, leaving Derry astonished and frozen. Supporting Cast: Barney Martin as Rupert Harney, Peter Brocco as Figaro, Ross Elliott as Lieutenant Geer, Anthony Call as Earl, Craig Duncan as Detective, Thomas Bellin as Bartender, Beverly Holliday as Cocktail Waitress
306	6	"Nothing Ever Happens in Linvale"	Herschel Daugherty	Richard Levinson, William Link	Gary Merrill as Harry Jarvis, Phyllis Thaxter as Mrs. Logan, Fess Parker as Sheriff Ben Wister	November 8, 1963
A widow tries to convince a police officer that her neighbor has murdered his wife. While Harry Jarvis drinks beer in his backyard, a child (Roter) comes looking for his lost cat, and Jarvis angrily orders the child away by accusing him of trespassing. Neighbor Mrs. Logan (Thaxter) calls Charlie (Furth) at the police station, desiring Sheriff Ben Wister (Parker) to go see her. Charlie finds Wister at Henry's (Reese) barbershop, and Wister sets off for Mrs. Logan's house. There, Mrs. Logan confides to the sheriff that she believes that Jarvis has done something nefarious, as he has done nothing but drink beer for three days, and Jarvis used to always argue with his wife (Marjorie), who has disappeared with her dog. Wister decides to set up an appointment with Jarvis under an assumed identity at Jarvis' business, but Deputy Charlie knows Jarvis and provides basic details to the sheriff. Sheriff Wister goes to see Dr. Wyatt (Lieb), who is a longtime friend of Jarvis, and who has noticed a change in behavior regarding Jarvis. Wister waits with the receptionist (Merchant) for Jarvis' wife, but Jarvis called to cancel her appointment with Dr. Lieb. The sheriff then travels to a bridge game at Mrs. Bergen's (Bartlett) house to ask her about Jarvis' wife, but Bergen hasn't been able to reach her. Mrs. Logan calls Wister to report that Jarvis is digging a large hole in his backyard. When Wister goes to watch with her, Jarvis sees Mrs. Logan looking at him, and he angrily confronts her about spying on him. Wister visits Jarvis to inquire about his wife, but Jarvis says that she went upstate with her dog. However, when Wister leaves, he runs into the neighbor boy, who says that he saw the dog that day. Mrs. Bergen stopped by to offer a recipe to Mrs. Jarvis, but he told her that the wife was unwell. Just then, Charlie calls in to report that he is following Jarvis, who just picked up a package. Wister visits the store to talk with proprietor Mr. Bell (Mustin), who reports that Jarvis bought fertilizer and rat poison. That night, Wister, Charlie, and local Al (Arvan) surveil Jarvis digging in his yard from Mrs. Logan's house. They confront Jarvis with shovels of their own, and they dig to find the wife's dead dog buried. When he realizes that the sheriff believes something sinister has occurred, Jarvis admits to Wister that his wife left him four days prior, after fifteen years of marriage, and he lets the sheriff search the home. Wister visits Mrs. Logan, who still believes that Jarvis has harmed his wife. After Wister leaves, Jarvis climbs into Mrs. Logan's yard with a shovel and sneaks into her home. When she sees him, they embrace romantically and discuss their statements to the sheriff. Jarvis then digs another hole before retrieving his wife's body from Logan's yard, where it had been hidden. Just then, the sheriff stops by again in order to retrieve the dog, and Logan, not knowing of the sheriff's presence, throws the shovel back over the fence while referring to Jarvis as "darling" before realizing with horror what has just transpired. Supporting Cast: George Furth as Deputy Charlie, Burt Mustin as Mr. Bell, Sam Reese as Henry the Barber, Martine Bartlett as Mrs. Bergen, Robert P. Lieb as Dr. Wyatt, Jan Arvan as Al, Cathie Merchant as Receptionist, Robert Roter as Boy
307	7	"Starring the Defense"	Joseph Pevney	Henry Slesar	Richard Basehart as Miles Crawford	November 15, 1963
A former actor defends his son on murder charges. Miles Crawford (Basehart) is awoken by his maid Jenny (Halop) as his friend Sam Brody (Collins) has stopped by to play gin rummy. Miles's son Tod (Pollick) arrives home early and snaps at Miles before stomping upstairs to his room, but Sam notices blood spots on the carpet. When Miles goes to confront Tod, Tod claims that it was a minor car accident before saying that it was a fight. Just then, Sam tells Miles that the police (Zuckert) have arrived, and officer Sam (Tarkington) shows Miles a warrant for Tod's arrest, as the person with whom Tod fought has died. Miles blames himself, as he was too busy acting and attending school to raise Tod. Miles visits the office of notable criminal attorney Ed Rutherford (Launer) (to represent Tod in court for the count of first-degree murder of his friend Jules), where he is greeted by Rutherford's daughter Ruthie (Diane), who serves as the secretary for her father. Miles and Ed argue about the merits of the case and whether Miles would be better representation for Tod, as he firmly believes that Tod did not intend to commit murder. Miles then visits Tod to gauge whether he would approve of Miles co-representing him with Ed, and Tod accepts his father's desired involvement. Ed faces off against prosecutor Hanley (Phillips), who firstly calls Rudy Trask (Connelly) to testify about the night's doings with Tod and the knife fight after an argument about Tod wanting to drink and drive. Miles gets Rudy to admit that Tod was cut first in questioning. Next, Tod's friend Babs Riordan (Hales) testifies that Tod and Jules ('Julie') hated each other, and that Tod threatened to kill Jules on multiple occasions. After the judge (Zaremba) calls for the day's recess, Tod admits to Miles that Babs is telling the truth, even as Miles seeks to destroy her testimony. Tod testifies that he didn't hate Jules, that he thought it would be a fistfight, and that Babs desired Jules, but on cross-examination he admits happiness that Jules is dead. Miles gives an impassioned performance in his closing argument in order to convince the jury, and many of those in the courtroom applaud. The next day, the judge recesses the court upon receiving new evidence from the prosecutor. The judge, the court bailiff (Williams), the prosecutor, and Miles watch one of Miles's films in which he gave the same speech in front of a similar judge (Leary), foreman (West), and defendant, Frankie (Allen), over thirty years prior. After the movie speech, the movie prison warden (Fredericks) and movie chaplain (Jackson) try to comfort condemned Frankie as he is led to the electrocution chamber. Tod is ultimately found guilty by the jury and is sentenced by the kind-hearted judge to life imprisonment, with the possibility of parole. Supporting Cast: Russell Collins as Sam Brody, S. John Launer as Defense Attorney Edwin C. 'Ed' Rutherford, Barney Phillips as Prosecutor Hanley, Christopher Connelly as Rudy Trask, Jean Hale as Babs Riordan, Rockne Tarkington as Pete the Police Officer, Teno Pollick as Tod Alexander Crawford, Diane Mountford as Ruthie Rutherford, Will Allen as Frankie the Movie Boy, Selmer Jackson as Movie Chaplain, Nolan Leary as Movie Judge, Charles Fredericks as Movie Warden, Buster West as Movie Foreman, Vince Williams as Court Bailiff, Florence Halop as Jenny the Maid (uncredited), Bill Zuckert as Lieutenant Raphael (uncredited)
308	8	"The Cadaver"	Alf Kjellin	James Bridges	Michael Parks as Skip Baxter, Joby Baker as Doc Carroll	November 29, 1963
A medical undergraduate tries to get his roommate to stop drinking by convincing him that he killed a girl. Professor Dawson (Blaine) lectures to his class concerning dissections before Charlie Pitts (Matthews) brings in the cadaver, which is fellow graduate student Doc Carroll (Baker) playing a practical joke to scare the class's students (Bernard). Later, female student Barbara Simms (Hayward) is forcibly carried to the men's dorm showers by drunken Skip Baxter (Parks) before Doc and other male students stop the assault. Skip drank over thirty beers and blacked out before his assault on Barbara, who was his love interest until the episode. At the Halloween carnival the next night, Skip gets a pie from student Ruby (West) to throw in Doc's face, and then he drinks forty-two beers before passing out and getting thrown out by the bartender Sam (Sharon). While talking with friend Pete (Cooper) and carrying Skip out of the event, Doc gets the idea to play a practical joke on Skip in order to get him to stop drinking alcohol. Doc tells Skip that he found "Ruby" strangled when Skip wakes up the next day. Doc goes to work for Professor Dawson while Skip sobers up with coffee and speaks with Barbara on the telephone. Skip panics when Tom Jackson (Marshall) comes by to check the dorms, and Skip convinces him not to check his room. Ed Blair (Johnson) comes, by as the football coach wants to know why Ship missed practice, and Ed helps Skip make his bed with clean sheets. Meanwhile, Professor Dawson discovers that a cadaver is missing from storage, and Doc admits the truth to him, with the professor ordering Doc to return the body at once. When Doc goes to get the body, he finds that Skip has taken it away. Doc goes to see Ed about Skip, and Ed reports that the coach is about to kick Skip off the team for absences. Skip drives around with the cadaver until he almost runs over talkative sixty-seven-year-old Mrs. Fister (McDevitt), who is taking out her garbage for the collector (Dockstader). She invites Skip in for a drink of gin, and he parks his car in her garage, concealing the body that he wrapped in a rug. She gives him the entire story of the neighborhood while they enjoy their drinks. When she calls the new young couple to tell them of trash collection procedure, Skip gets the idea of disposing of the body by grinding into pulp where the trash is destroyed. After Mrs. Fister temporarily passes out from drinking, Skip goes to her garage to saw up the body, he cuts up the body and wraps it for the trash, and the collector takes it the next morning, to Skip's relief. Skip returns to campus only to find Ed collecting his football gear, as the coach has kicked him off the team. Skip goes to get a drink from bartender Sam just as Ruby arrives, leaving Skip in shock by her appearance. Doc arrives just then and asks about the cadaver's location, and Skip leads Doc away. At Professor Dawson's next class, a female student (FitzSimons) finds Doc's body in the freezer, initially believing it to be another joke. Dawson grabs Doc's stiff body, realizing the truth, as Skip laughs maniacally in the corner. Supporting Cast: Don Marshall as Tom Jackson, Rafer Johnson as Ed Blair, Jeff Cooper as Pete Phillips, Brooke Hayward as Barbara Simms, Ruth McDevitt as Mrs. Fister, Martin Blaine as Professor Dawson, Eric Matthews as Charlie Pitts, Michael Beirne as Jim Thompson, Jennifer West as Ruby, William Sharon as Sam the Bartender, Bob Bernard as First Student, Bronwyn FitzSimons as Girl Student, George Dockstader as Garbage Collector
309	9	"The Dividing Wall"	Bernard Girard	Joel Murcott (teleplay)	James Gregory as Fred Kruger, Katharine Ross as Carol Brandt	December 6, 1963
A break-in gang gets exposed to a radioactive capsule. A little boy, Jimmy (Corey), scares his sister with a mask while his sitter tries to calm the two down. Meanwhile, lead mechanic Fred Kruger (Gregory) tries to get fellow mechanics Terry (Robinson) and Al Norman (Fell) to work at Fred's tow service, though Terry is recently released from state prison and suffers from claustrophobia while attempting to work under the vehicle's engine. He goes outside to get some air and speaks with his love interest, Carol Brandt (Ross), who is hesitant to fully engage in dating. He admits his troubled past to her, and she speaks of her troubles with forming a relationship. Later, former convict Fred discusses a robbery plan to net $120,000 with fellow former convicts Terry and Al. They break into the industrial plant while disguised, tying up security, and attempt to grab the safe, which proves heavier than they thought. They then commandeer a forklift to load the safe into the stolen delicatessen vehicle they had grabbed for the job. While fleeing, they get pursued by the police, but they escape by timing when a train will pass by. Al torches into the safe, and they find $112,000 and a small, hardened container that contains a radiation warning label on the side for cobalt-60, which is used to scan steel beams. Government Custodian Frank Ludden (Kelljan) of the United States Atomic Energy Commission works with Larry Polson (Foster) and Durrell (Scott) to locate the stolen cobalt, while Al complains to Fred that he touched the element, and his fingers are now numb with burns on them. They close the towing shop while they plan what to do, as the opened container is in the shop. Terry goes next door to see Carol, but they are interrupted by customer Mrs. Callucci (Vanni), who needs to use the telephone. Terry collects the courage to tell Carol that he loves her before the two notice that her bird has died. Terry tries to convince Carol to come with him to Mexico, so Carol's father Otto (Lane) tells Carol to admit the truth about her past, and she confesses to formerly being married with a baby boy, whom she gave up for adoption. This angers Terry greatly, and he storms away. Later that night, Al is shot while standing at the entrance of a hospital. AEC radio operator (Boyett) gets a call for Ludden to say that a man (Al) was found dead due to exposure, and therefore the container is likely open, so a newscast is issued, which Terry and Fred watch. Fred admits to killing Al, and when Terry says that Fred will have to do the same to him, Fred locks Terry in a small room, triggering Terry's claustrophobia. Terry escapes and goes to see Carol, who is looking after her now sick father, but Carol and her father rebuff Terry and order him to leave. Terry goes to the tow shop and loads the container into the stolen truck just as Fred arrives. Fred punches Terry and knocks him unconscious into the mechanic's bay, which he seals. Just as Fred attempts to leave with the money, the AEC officials arrive with the military and police, and Fred is shot after he ignores their orders and shoots at the officials. Terry is let out and apologizes to Carol, who sympathizes with him. Supporting Cast: Chris Robinson as Terry, Norman Fell as Al Norman, Rusty Lane as Otto Brandt, Simon Scott as Durrell, Renata Vanni as Mrs. Callucci, Robert Kelljan as Government Custodian Frank Ludden, Judd Foster as Larry Polson, William Boyett as the Radio Operator, Erik Corey as Jimmy (the Little Boy)
310	10	"Good-Bye, George"	Robert Stevens	William Fay	Robert Culp as Harry Lawrence, Stubby Kaye as George Cassidy	December 13, 1963
A movie actress is visited by her ex-convict husband, who she had assumed was dead. A movie actress is visited by her ex-convict husband, who she had assumed was dead. Actress Lana Layne (Barry) films a scene, as a nun, with the director (Kopell) and receives acclaim from agent Harry Lawrence (Culp) before being interviewed by Haila French (Pearce) and her photographer Al (Joyce). She hallucinates and sees her "dead" husband George Cassidy (Kaye), causing her to cancel the remainder of the interview. This greatly upsets head publicist Dave Dennis (Reid), and Harry promises to make things right with Haila, who writes for 300 newspapers. When Lana returns home, she is followed by George, who greets her as "Peaches" to her shock and dismay. Peaches had read in the paper that George was shot in Newark, but George had switched wallets with another man and then disappeared, before he was caught in St. Louis by police and forced to serve five years in prison. Peaches tries to pay off George then and there, but George wants to wait until after the Academy Awards, which Peaches is highly favored to win. After Peaches wins Best Actress, she enjoys an after-party with Harry and Dave as a bartender Ed (Ragan) happily serves drinks. Just before she begins to interview with Haila again, she spies George present, as he pretended to be with the press. Peaches shoves young starlet Sally Jackson (Carter-Ihnat) in front of the press while she privately attempts to determine George's motives, which he reveals to be community property after they discuss her marriage to him at age seventeen in Mexico. George details his fantasy for their life before attempting to force romance upon her, and she strikes and kills him with a statuette in her defense. Lana calls in Harry, who reacts without emotion about her choices before Dave bangs on the door to demand that Peaches meet with the press. They shove George's body in a closet while Lana meets with the waiting public, just in time as Haila was about to angrily leave. Harry announces to the assembled guests that he and Lana are to be married in Tijuana, which greatly upsets Haila as she wanted to be the first to be told of the engagement. Afterward, Harry and Lana plan on how to lose the press in Mexico and cross the border at Mexicali to bury George at Harry's cabin. Harry promises Dave that they will give a honeymoon report to Haila, who has angrily left. After getting married in Tijuana in front of a large crowd, they set off to get rid of the body. They easily pass through border customs but are soon pulled over by a police officer (Martin) for driving eighty-five miles per hour, but he lets them go with a gruff warning. When they enter the cabin (with Harry carrying George) and turn on the lights, friends, colleagues, and the press (including Haila) yell surprise before quickly snapping pictures of the trio. A newspaper details Lana and Harry being charged with murder, with it being revealed that Dave found their getaway map and staged the surprise at the cabin to appease Haila. Supporting Cast: Patricia Barry as Lana Layne / Rosemary 'Peaches' Cassidy, Elliott Reid as Dave Dennis, Alice Pearce as Haila French, Sally Carter-Ihnat (credited as Sally Carter) as Sally Jackson the Starlet, Jimmy Joyce as Ed the Photographer, Mike Ragan as Al the Bartender, Bernie Kopell as Director, Kreg Martin as Patrol Officer
311	11	"How to Get Rid of Your Wife"	Alf Kjellin	Robert Gould	Bob Newhart as Gerald Swinney, Jane Withers as Edith Swinney	December 20, 1963
A gentleman and his wife each plot the other's murder. Gerald Swinney (Newhart) visits a dancehall and talks with doorman Oscar (Hamilton) in order to speak with dancer Rosie Feather (Jameson), to whom he has brought carnations. He apologizes to her about having her testify in court, but she is excited by all the attention that she has received. He flashes back to when his relationship with his wife Edith (Withers) went wrong, as she became disappointed in him being a bank clerk for fifteen years and on them having to rely upon her mother, and he hated that she gave away his fishing gear. He asked her for a divorce, but she refused, so he worked on a plan to get rid of her. He purposefully stages a public performance in front of neighbors Mr. and Mrs. Penny (Quinn and Winston), and Mrs. Penny gossips on the matter with Mrs. Harris (Bonney). Gerald cooks breakfast and insinuates that he put weed killer in his wife's coffee and food. Edith then calls friend Laura (Scott) and tries to convince her of Gerald's intentions, but Laura doesn't believe her. Gerald successfully portrays Edith as an angry tyrant and himself, as Mr. Quinn states, as "some kind of saint." Edith invites Laura and husband Henry (Petrie) over to state her case to them about Gerald, but they tell Edith that they want her to see a doctor. When they are eating dinner, a delivery man (Wellman Jr.) arrives with fish tanks for the fishpond Gerald is digging in the backyard. Laura is afraid for Gerald instead of Edith, as she is panicky and paranoid while he is calm and convivial. After they leave, Gerald goads Edith into kicking him out of the house and off the property, which is noticed by the neighbors. When Gerald leaves on Sunday morning, so that he will receive maximum exposure for the church-going neighbors, Edith finds a picture of Rosie under his pillow. Edith visits Rosie to argue about Gerald being hers and yell at Rosie, but Rosie claims that she doesn't know Gerald and calls for help from doorman Oscar. After Edith orders Gerald home, he goes to a pet shop and purchases two rats from the proprietress (Guilbert). He puts the rats under the sink for Edith to find, so she purchases poison to exterminate them. That night, she poisons his hot chocolate with rat poison. She finds him the next morning and calls Henry to say that Gerald poisoned himself. The police sergeant (Karnes) arrives and Gerald suddenly awakes to state that the note he left was about him leaving her. The district attorney (Gould) prosecutes Edith, noting that the photo of Rosie was left in a library book. Laura testifies that Edith spoke often of death and poison, and Mrs. Harris testifies that Edith spoke of suicide. A salesman (Hines) testifies that she bought the rat poison used, and Mrs. Penny states that Edith kept her house spotless and clean, meaning that she would never need the poison. The jury found Edith guilty, and she was sentenced to five years in prison. Gerald successfully asks Rosie out for a date, but he is confronted outside the dancehall by the pet shop proprietress, who has been following the case and demands that they date in order to keep quiet about the purchase of the rats. Supporting Cast: Joyce Jameson as Rosie Feather, George Petrie as Henry, Bill Quinn as Mr. Penny, Mary Scott as Laura, Joseph Hamilton as Oscar the Stage Doorman, Helene Winston as Mrs. Penny, Gail Bonney as Mrs. Harris, Robert Karnes as Sergeant, Harold Gould as District Attorney, Ann Morgan Guilbert as Pet Shop Proprietress, William Wellman Jr. as Delivery Man, Harry Hines as Rat Poison Salesman
312	12	"Three Wives Too Many"	Joseph M. Newman	Kenneth Fearing (short story); Arthur A. Ross (teleplay)	Teresa Wright as Marion Brown, Dan Duryea as Raymond Brown	January 3, 1964
A woman learns that her husband has at least three other wives. Marion Brown (Wright) takes a taxi to the Newark home of Bernice Brown (Hale), to whom Marion emotionlessly reveals that she is also married to Bernice's husband, Raymond (Duryea). Marion then asks for a drink and poisons Bernice in order to keep Raymond for herself. She then flies back home to Baltimore to arrive before Raymond returns from a business trip. After spending some time together and Raymond "accidentally" falling and almost being crushed by a fuel tank in the basement, Raymond talks with Mr. Bleeker (Cronthwaite) about marriage for love versus marriage for money. Raymond then travels to Newark just as Bernice's body has been found by police, and he is greatly devastated. Lieutenant Storber (Gravers) questions him about whether Bernice was suicidal, and Storber unknowingly stops Raymond from drinking the poisoned scotch that killed Bernice. After Bernice's funeral, Raymond argues with her sister (Thompson) and brother-in-law (Fresco) about the relationship and Bernice's belongings. Raymond then calls another wife, Lucille (Lawson), who lives in Boston. Just as they hang up, Marion arrives at Lucille's home with a pistol, but Marion realizes that Raymond has been married to Lucille for five years, versus only three to Marion, meaning Marion is the other woman. They figure out that Raymond marries exclusively for money, as Marion is the oldest and richest of his wives, and they plan on how to get revenge. However, Marion poisons Lucille and Raymond arrives, once again, just as police and paramedics are taking her body. Police Detective Lanning (Brown) believes it was suicide and questions an astonished Raymond. Raymond calls Marion, and she gets him to let her meet him in Boston for some fun together for a night. Later that night, Raymond goes to meet Bleeker about his racetrack operation, as he has lost multiple financial backers. Raymond then visits another wife's (Helen) apartment, only to discover Police Detective Mallard (Grey) looking over her dead body. Raymond returns to Baltimore and finds Marion lying still on the couch, causing him to yell out as he believes her to be dead. She offers to make him a drink, as she has been "practicing", which makes him fearful due to recent circumstances and as she never drinks. Marion cheerfully tells Raymond to inform his company that he must stay local from now on to be with her. Raymond accuses her directly of murdering the women, and Marion outlines how Raymond has committed bigamy and would be the primary suspect, due to motive. After reluctantly agreeing to give in to her demands, he asks about what if he changes his mind. She replies that other than the police, there is always the hole in the cellar. Supporting Cast: Jean Hale as Bernice Brown, Linda Lawson as Lucille Brown, Robert Cornthwaite as Mr. Bleeker, Steve Gravers as Lieutenant Storber, Duane Grey as Detective Mallard, Lew Brown as Detective Lanning, David Fresco as Brother-in-Law, Dee J. Thompson as Sister-in-Law
313	13	"The Magic Shop"	Robert Stevens	H. G. Wells (story); John Collier (teleplay)	Leslie Nielsen as Steven Grainger, Peggy McCay as Mrs. Grainger	January 10, 1964
A boy gains the power of mind over matter. Steven Grainger (Nielsen) narrates the change for young son Tony (Megna) as Steven and his wife (McCay) celebrate Tony's birthday. They get a visit from Mr. Adams (Hartman), who brings Tony a gift of a filled piggy bank and roses for Mrs. Grainger. Tony wants to use his birthday money to visit the local magic shop, which Steven and the wife have looked for and failed to find. When they leave the house, Tony almost gets run over, drawing the ire of a police officer (Sanders), before Tony finds the magic shop in question. The proprietor, Mr. Dulong (Opatoshu), makes himself known and shows the Graingers some magical items and tricks, but Dulong knows that Tony wants to see and know real magic. A boy, Eric (Corcoran), and his mother (Swanson) arrive at the front door, but the mother can only see and empty building while Eric sees the people inside. Dulong gives Tony a policeman doll and a pin, and he instructs Tony to stab the doll with the pin. In the background, sounds of pain and agony can be heard after Tony stabs the doll. Dulong then makes Tony disappear in a magical box trick in front of Steven, with only Tony's laughter to be heard. When Steven gets angry and tries to attack Dulong, Steven passes out and awakens in the middle of the street, where he is almost hit by an old man (Sedan) as onlookers (Rich, Richards) watch. A medical intern (Reiner) tries to calm Steven as he rants about Tony and the magic shop, which other see as a travel agency. Steven is brought to speak with Police Lieutenant Herlie (de Corsia), who challenges Steven's assertions before sending him home. The next day, Tony suddenly appears at the top of the stairs and wants breakfast. Tony claims to have been gone for weeks, even though it was just the previous day. When no one is watching, Tony performs a series of hand motions and makes the flowers given by Mr. Adams suddenly die. The Graingers take Tony to see a clinical psychologist, Dr. James Stone (Sargent), who tries to get information from Tony, but fails. Stone reveals that a Dulong Apothecary was destroyed by Cotton Mather in 1692 and another existed in the early 1900s. Stone recommends that the Graingers let Tony adopt a dog from the nearby pound, which leads Tony to adopt a shepherd mix he names Dulong. The shepherd bites Mr. Adams, and Tony panics his parents when he says that not only will he teach the dog tricks, but that he will do everything the dog says as well. Tony makes a little girl's balloon pop, which angers an older girl named Susan (Ferdin). After she threatens to clobber Tony, he makes the water sprinklers turn on and soak her dress. The next day, Dulong attacks Mr. Adams again, so Adams kills Dulong with a garden hoe, claiming that the dog rotted away into little pieces almost immediately. Tony overhears this and becomes angry, so that night he makes Adams' house catch on fire, and Adams dies. When the Graingers confront Tony, he stabs a picture of his father with a knife, which makes Steven's face bleed in the exact spot featured in the picture. Steven then narrates that this is how he and the Mrs. have become slaves to Tony's desires as they share a quiet meal together. Supporting Cast: John Megna as Anthony Richard 'Tony' Grainger, David Opatoshu as Mr. Dulong, Ted de Corsia as Lieutenant Herlie, Paul Hartman as Mr. Adams, William Sargent as Dr. James Stone, Brian Corcoran as Eric, Hugh Sanders as 1st Cop, Rolfe Sedan as Old Man, Audrey Swanson as Eric's Mother, Robert Reiner as Intern, Wendy Ferdin as Susan (uncredited), Ron Rich as Onlooker (uncredited), Leoda Richards as Onlooker (uncredited) Note: Multiple characters, including firemen, policeman, and onlookers, are uncredited and currently unknown.
314	14	"Beyond the Sea of Death"	Alf Kjellin	Miriam Allen DeFord (short story); William D. Gordon and Alfred Hayes (teleplay)	Mildred Dunnock as Minnie Briggs, Diana Hyland as Grace Renford	January 24, 1964
A San Francisco heiress ends her marriage to a fortune hunter. Minnie Briggs (Dunnock) attempts to help her despondent friend Grace Renford (Hyland), who is suicidal following the breakup of her one-year relationship with Keith Holloway (Slate). She flashes back to when mining engineer Keith, a Boston native living in Bolivia, checked into Hotel Croydon with the clerk (Williams) and quickly received a phone call from Grace. Grace gets butler Charles (Sherman) to call a car for her and show great excitement that Keith desires to see her for herself and not because of her notable deceased father. Grace explains to Minnie that she has been a pin-pal with Keith, but Minnie believes that Keith only wants Grace's wealth. Grace attempts to cook the perfect meal for Keith, but she burns the steak and forgets to put coffee in the water. He regales her with his poetry and his exploits from around the world and they go watch a football game. Keith proposes marriage to Grace in a local park before Grace reveals her real identity as a wealthy divorced heiress who is careful about being swindled for her money. She accepts his proposal, and they decide to live in Potosí. He leaves to find a house in Bolivia, and they renew their correspondence via letters. After a while, she receives a letter stating that Keith has died. While languishing over his death, she receives an advertisement for a lecture by Bombay medium Dr. R.D. Shankara (Sofaer) about the Rossetti poem Keith recited to Grace, "Beyond the Sea of Death". She visits Dr. Shankara in his hotel to discuss Keith and attempt to contact him, and "Keith" says that he wants Grace to be closer to him. Grace offers to become a worker at Shankara's temple to help others, and she wants to donate all her money to him to build a shrine. Minnie tries to reason with Grace but fails to reach her, so she goes to visit Shankara and runs into Lucy Barrington (Ayars), whom she questions as a supposed client of Shankara. Lucy had a similar background and similar experiences as Grace, following in love with a Bolivian pen-pal, Herbert, found in a magazine who died in an explosion. Herbert's picture matches that of Keith, so Minnie confronts Grace, who fails to believe her. Minnie reveals that the police have arrested Shankara and are looking for Keith, and Police Lieutenant Farrell (DeSales) reveals Keith's real identity to be Harold Drummond. Grace runs crying upstairs, with Minnie following and offering sympathies. Grace draws a revolver from the study and shoots Minnie, blaming her for taking Keith away. Supporting Cast: Jeremy Slate as Keith Holloway, Abraham Sofaer as Dr. R.D. Shankara, Ann Ayars as Lucy Barrington, Francis DeSales as Lieutenant Farrell, Orville Sherman as Charles, Ollie O'Toole as Second Hotel Clerk, Vince Williams as First Hotel Clerk, Jim Barringer as Messenger Boy
315	15	"Night Caller"	Alf Kjellin	Robert Westerby (teleplay)	Bruce Dern as Roy Bullock, Felicia Farr as Marcia Fowler	January 31, 1964
A woman is driven to madness by a young man and a series of intimidating phone calls. Marcia Fowler (Farr), home alone while her husband Jack (D. White) is away on business in Chicago, receives a call from her lover as she is spied upon by Roy Bullock (Dern). She catches him and angrily orders him away, but he refuses to leave, so she calls the police. Officers (W. White) question her and take down details of the incident. The police officers leave and question a woman shopper (Morris) leaving the store, and she sends them to the Masters' house. Mrs. Masters (Harrower) identifies the man as her nephew, Roy, and the police officer questions him about being a peeping Tom. When Jack arrives home, he is told by neighbor Lucy Phillips (Greene) about the incident, as Lucy has brought cookies to the Fowlers with the intent of spreading some gossip about Marcia. Jack's son Stevey (Barringer) soon arrives and receives a gift mechanized toy plane from Jack. When Marcia gets home, she and Jack argue about the incident and Marcia not preparing for his return. Marcia then receives an anonymous phone call, which puzzles Jack. That night, Jack visits Roy, who is having fun listening to music with his girlfriend Nancy Willis (Sayer) and friends. Roy apologizes and Jack accepts before leaving amicably. The next day, Roy goes to the local park and helps Stevey with his toy plane before inquiring about Stevey's schedule and activities. Jack comes by to give Stevey a ride home but allows Roy to look after Stevey and walk him home. Jack goes home and fights with Marcia about him playing cards with friends and Marcia wanting to go out more. When Roy drops off Stevey, Marcia gets angry and Jack storms out just before Marcia sees Roy staring at her through the kitchen window. That night, Marcia receives another phone call, with the caller discussing her being alone and her looks. She calls Jack's friend Ken just as Jack arrives home, and Jack agrees to go see Roy in order to calm Marcia. Roy says that he didn't call Marcia and claims that he was on a date with Nancy, convincing Jack that Marcia just wants attention from Jack himself. Before Jack gets back home, Marcia gets another call, this time about her nightgown. The next day, Roy plays basketball with Stevey in the park, angering Nancy for not spending time with her. Meanwhile, Jack attempts to talk Marcia into going with him on a driving trip for business to San Francisco, but she talks him into taking Stevey instead on a plane trip, which delights Stevey. When Marcia goes out the next day, she is greeted with another phone call upon returning home. Just afterward, Roy knocks on the door with a toy plane for Stevey and demands to speak with Marcia. Roy compares Marcia's treatment of Stevey to his stepmother's treatment of him and his father, calling her vain, selfish, and conceited. When he tells her that he smells death on her and threatens to tell Jack, she pulls out a gun and shoots him multiple times. Just then she receives another phone call from the serial harasser, and her nightmare continues. Supporting Cast: David White as Jack Fowler, Angela Greene as Lucy Phillips, Elizabeth Harrower as Mrs. Masters, Leslie Barringer as Stevey Fowler, Diane Sayer as Nancy Willis, Frances Morris as Woman Shopper, Will J. White as Policeman Casting Note: The second policeman is uncredited and currently unknown.
316	16	"The Evil of Adelaide Winters"	Laslo Benedek	Arthur A. Ross	Kim Hunter as Adelaide Winters, John Larkin as Edward Porter	February 7, 1964
June 1944. A convicted artist claims that she can make contact with the dead. Adelaide Winters (Hunter) promises Mr. and Mrs. Thompson (Robinson and Bromley) that she can contact their son, Private Harry Thompson, who has recently disappeared and is presumed to have died in the Normandy invasion of World War II. She plays a record containing sounds of war before attempting to speak to him. Afterward, the Thompson's pay money to her associate and teacher Robert McBain (Lyons). Adelaide and Robert then argue about her disgust of people she considers weak for seeking such comfort and her greed over seeking out relatives of men missing in action. They read the name of a missing lieutenant, John F. Porter, and then contact his father, Edward Porter (Larkin), claiming to be the War Department with a declaration of death for John. Adelaide visits Edward three times to solicit his involvement. She conducts her seance and has Robert speak through a speaker system as John's spirit dead at sea, but in peace. With Edward convinced, he continues to seek Adelaide's services, eventually demanding that she only serve his interests and see no other clients. He demands that she and Robert live and stay at his residence and continue to help him communicate with his son. Adelaide and Robert agree to put several radio transmitters throughout the house to use for manipulating Edward as they cannot install their speaker system. Robert begins collecting mail in order to seize letters from the War Department warning people of scammers like Adelaide, and Robert wants to two of them to flee. Adelaide wants to stay, saying that she will marry Edward, who has become obsessed with her. At night, Edward wakes Adelaide and proposes marriage, but he believes that they were actually with John in that moment. As Robert notices the next day, even Adelaide has become frightened of Edward's increasingly erratic behavior and further lack of connection to reality. That night, Edward wakes Adelaide, and after asking what exactly his wealth and John mean to her, declares that they should join John and leave this world behind. When he produces a gun, she flees the house looking for Robert, but he has left. Edward then finds her in the guesthouse formerly inhabited by Robert, and while she proclaims that it was all a lie, he shoots her and then himself. Supporting Cast: Gene Lyons as Robert McBain, Bartlett Robinson as Mr. Thompson, Sheila Bromley as Mrs. Thompson
317	17	"The Jar"	Norman Lloyd	Ray Bradbury (short story); James Bridges (teleplay)	Pat Buttram as Charlie Hill, Collin Wilcox as Thedy Sue Hill, George Lindsey Juke Marmer, Slim Pickens as Sheriff Clem Carter	February 14, 1964
Fed up with having nothing interesting to display for the town of Wilder's Holler, no respect from the townsfolk, and no way to impress his philandering wife Thedy Sue (Wilcox), Charlie Hill (Buttram) purchases a strange jar filled with unidentified things from a carnival barker (Barty) for twelve dollars and twenty-five cents. Thedy Sue, meanwhile, is having an affair with Tom Carmody (Best) and his fast car, with Sheriff Clem Carter (Pickens) too lazy to do anything about it. Shopkeeper Gramps Medknowe (Reid) speaks with Clem and Milt Marshall (Reese) about their openness when Charlie arrives and gives Gramps a glimpse of the jar, which makes Milt and Clem jealous. Charlie invites townsfolk to come by and view the jar at his home. Charlie gets home just as Thedy arrives, with her demanding the personalized sequined ribbon that she told him to get at the carnival. She is disgusted by the jar and is angry that Charlie spent their produce money on it, but Charlie is only upset that she did not kiss him when he came home. Just then, Gramps, Clem, and Milt stop by to leer at the jar. Weeks later, a crowd gathers to view the jar, with Granny Carnation (Darwell), Jahdoo (Marshall), Juke Marmer (Lindsey), Emma Jane (Brando), her daughter Eva Ann (De Lamater), Mrs. Tridden (Backes), and other townspeople (Ploski, Hack) all intently surveying the jar's contents. Only Thedy Sue and Tom Carmody see the situation as a joke. Gramps admits to losing sleep over the jar, while Juke mentions his father ordering him as a child to drown kittens and sees the object as a kitten floating. Emma Jane debates with Gramps and Granny about the color of the eye and hair, and Charlie states his belief that it was something or someone that sunk down in the swamps. Mrs. Tridden relates that she lost her child Foley in the swamp that way, and she believes that is her son in the jar. Tom dismisses the jar and leaves, with Thedy Sue sneaking out after him. Granny states that the contents must be a combination of all things, like grass and snakes, while Eva Ann believes that it is the boogeyman. Later that night, Tom breaks in and steals the jar to the delight of Thedy Sue. Charlie wakes up to discover the jar missing, and he drives to get Clem to search. When Clem says that he won't look until tomorrow, Juke tells Charlie and Thedy Sue that Tom gave one dollar to Jahdoo to bust up the jar at the nearby swamp. Charlie drives to the swamp with a double-barreled shotgun and finds the jar sitting on a fallen tree, but he gets stuck and yells for help. Jahdoo has been staring at the jar the whole time, and he states his belief that the contents are a part of all life that keeps changing and is the heart and center of all creation. Jahdoo finally helps pull Charlie out just as he starts to sink under the waterline, and Charlie takes the jar home. When Thedy Sue laughs at him and attempts to break the jar with a cooking spoon, Charlie threatens to hit her with it, and she runs away. The next day, Thedy Sue returns happily, as she has been at the carnival. She and Tom spoke to the barker about the jar, with the barker admitting that the contents are paper, clay, cotton, silt, an innertube, and a doll's eyes. The barker happily ripped off Charlie by selling a two-dollar jar for over twelve. Thedy Sue says that she will tell all the townsfolk about it, and then she begins taking all the contents out and throwing them at Charlie, so Charlie puts a cloth over her head and strangles her. Later that night, Charlie serves watermelon before revealing the jar, with Gramps and the rest commenting on the content's change. Even Tom is now transfixed by the jar, and all stare in silence for a long while. Finally, Eva Ann goes up to the jar and reads Thedy Sue's name from the ribbon Charlie had bought for her, and everyone realizes with horror that Thedy Sue's head now serves as the contents of the jar. Supporting Cast: Billy Barty as The Barker, James Best as Tom Carmody, William Marshall as Jahdoo, Jane Darwell as Granny Carnation, Carl Benton Reid as Gramps Medknowe, Sam Reese as Milt Marshall, Jocelyn Brando as Emma Jane, Alice Backes as Mrs. Tridden, Marlene De Lamater as Eva Ann, Joe Ploski as Townsman (uncredited), Herman Hack as Townsman (uncredited) This episode was nominated for a Primetime Emmy Award for James Bridges for Outstanding Writing Achievement in Drama – Adaptation at the 16th Primetime Emmy Awards on May 25, 1964.
318	18	"Final Escape"	William Witney	Thomas H. Cannan, Jr., Randall Hood (story); John Resko (teleplay)	Stephen McNally as Captain Tolman, Robert Keith as Doc, Edd Byrnes as Paul Perry	February 21, 1964
A prisoner matches wits with his custodian in his efforts to escape from a maximum-security prison. Prisoner Paul Perry is caught at a river while trying to escape by guard captain Tolman (McNally) and his fellow guards (J Kellogg, Pope, Alderson), who then proceed to push him for information about his partners from a robbery and the location of the stolen money. They arrive to find prisoner Doc (Keith) drunk while burying a prisoner in the prison graveyard. Tolman informs Doc that his sick granddaughter Elissa (Hale) while receive good care from the county hospital before escorting Perry back to the prison lumber camp. Tolman invites Perry to discuss a plea deal offered by the district attorney, with him pleading guilty to serve one year or facing fifteen years at trial. Perry agrees to the deal, which makes his total sentence a minimum of eleven years. Afterward, Doc recruits Perry to help him build wooden coffins, the specialty of the prison lumber camp. Doc soon collapses, worn out after working for twenty-nine years on the camp. Perry's lawyer (Harris) tries to keep up Perry's spirits while telling him to peacefully serve his time, but Perry is distracted by a crying woman and Doc's granddaughter Elissa, whom he gives a paper origami toy to her delight. Captain Tolman calls in Doc to convince him to work against Perry but gives Doc bad news about Elissa having to wait for access to the hospital. Doc tells Perry that he earns twelve cents per day but needs $5,000 for Elissa. He tells Perry to send a letter to Perry's lawyer to get the needed money to Doc's son for Elissa and Doc will help Perry escape in a coffin. Tolman confronts Doc about Doc's son and Elissa going back east for an operation and questions whether Perry is involved. Meanwhile, a convict (Colasanto) is injured when a log falls on him, and soon afterward Perry injures himself purposefully to get a cast and rest near Doc. Tolman has the convict blacksmith (R Kellogg) unchain Perry so that Perry can properly rest, though he doesn't trust him. Perry wants Doc to kill the badly injured convict, but Doc threatens to go tell Tolman everything, as he won't participate in killing anyone. Soon after, though, the convict dies on his own. Later, Doc drunkenly gives Perry supplies, including a shroud, chocolate, cigarettes, and matches. Perry sneaks out to find the coffin in the morgue and hides himself in the coffin just before the burial detail arrives, with one inmate (Morris) arguing with the blacksmith. They bury the coffin and drive away, with Perry expecting the wait to be just five minutes. However, time slips by as Doc doesn't show and Perry burns through his matches in a panic. With a final match, Perry finally realizes that the body lying next to him in the coffin is that of Doc, who had died during the night. Supporting Cast: Betsy Hale as Elissa, Nicholas Colasanto as Work Partner, Stacy Harris as Lawyer, Bernie Hamilton as Second Convict, John Kellogg as First Guard, John Alderson as Third Guard, Ray Kellogg as Convict Blacksmith, Hinton Pope as Second Guard, Greg Morris as Burial Detail Inmate (uncredited)
319	19	"Murder Case"	John Brahm	James Bridges	John Cassavetes as Lee Griffin, Gena Rowlands as Diana Justin	March 6, 1964
London. Charles (Matheson) and Diana Justin (Rowlands) attend actor casting auditions for the play "The Count of Ten" with Tony Niles (Wright) and the author James Willis (Lupino), whom Diana dismisses. Niles immediately dismisses an older actor as they want someone younger. Charles then leaves, and Diana is surprised by the audition appearance of fellow American Lee Griffin (Cassavetes), her former lover. They speak lines together and sparks arise, although Lee quietly threatens to kill Diana if he doesn't get the part; she tells Niles and the author to hire him. After rehearsing lines the first day, he corners her and proposes a play that he is writing, one that perfectly encapsulates their relationship as horrible people turned struggling actors, though she made it big by marrying into wealth. During cast rehearsal, Lee almost strangles fellow actor Peter (Frankham), and the cast and crew have to pull him off. Later, Lee and Diana intimately discuss Diana's current wealth of $80,000, which doesn't count Charles' wealth. Lee then brings up the idea of Charles suffering a premature death. At the celebratory afterparty on opening night, Lee flirts with a young ingenue (Victor), which makes Diana jealous, but Charles notices the glances between Lee and Diana. In Diana's dressing room, she and Lee argue before Charles arrives to take Diana to their Victorian home in the country. They invite Lee to visit their home, and Lee and Diana spend the next day driving fast on the rural roads while drinking. Lee admires Charles' Rolls Royce, and he disables the brakes just before Charles returns from hunting quail. During the play, Lee calls Charles, who answers the phone instead of his servant Bates (Tovey), and Lee tells Charles that he and Diana almost had an accident so that Charles will drive his now-defective car to pick her up. Immediately after the play ends, Diana is surprised by a call from the police, and Lee tells her to play the part accordingly. At the country house, Detective Sergeant Elliott (Peel) is discussing with local Collins (Dillon) about how Charles' car collided with Collins' tractor, but the accident saved him from driving off a cliff. Charles suffered a concussion but is otherwise okay. Diana asks Charles about why he was driving, and he mentions the supposed accident Lee had mentioned on the phone, with which Diana badly goes along. Charles angrily orders Lee away before disclosing to Diana the next day that he is closing the play to save his marriage. He wants Diana and himself to leave for a vacation in Paris immediately. That night, Lee hires local hitman Blackie (Mattingly) for $100,000 to murder Charles, with half paid up front and half paid after the deed is completed. Lee calls Diana to discuss their plans to meet in Paris, but Charles listens in on the call and hears much, including Diana's insults of him. Charles meets Lee on the steamship for Holland, and Lee shoots Charles when the steam whistle blows. As Lee is dumping Charles' body out the porthole, the bar steward (Drayton) brings drinks that Charles had ordered. At the Dutch inspection point, an inspector (Banner) calls Lee aside to search his possessions, as Lee had claimed to be a diamond seller. When they search Lee's car's trunk, Diana's body suddenly falls from a concealed compartment, to Lee's horror. Supporting Cast: Murray Matheson as Charles Justin, Ben Wright as Tony Niles, Richard Lupino as James Willis the Author, David Frankham as Peter, Hedley Mattingly as Blackie, Richard Peel as Detective Sergeant Elliott, Brendan Dillon as Collins, John Banner as Dutch Customs Inspector, Noel Drayton as Bar Steward, Ina Victor as Young Ingenue, Arthur Tovey as Bates the Servant (uncredited)
320	20	"Anyone for Murder?"	Leo Penn	Jack Ritchie (short story)	Barry Nelson as Dr. James Parkerson, Patricia Breslin as Doris Parkerson, Richard Dawson as Robert Johnson	March 13, 1964
Professor and Dean of Psychology Dr. James Parkerson (Nelson) comes home and calls the local newspaper to complain about his advertisement not being printed in the classified section. He and his wife Doris (Breslin) discuss the delay of his sabbatical leave once again, and he promises to take it once one last project is completed. James calls the newspaper once again to find that the police have printed the publication of his ad, so he goes to meet newspaper editor Mr. Conelly (Jacquin) and Police Detective Barker (Slattery). He says that his ad merely seeks to find out if there are more husbands and wives who would want to kill each other if they could have someone else commit the murder. He agrees to meet one of the respondents who desires to meet in a local bar, but the newspaper refuses to print any more of his advertisements. At the bar, he orders drinks from the waiter (Fresco) and asks about anyone asking for him, but the waiter is confounded. Finally, a man at the bar (Woods) discretely asks to meet him outside, but the man punches James for peeping at his girl and goes back inside. Just then, a man named Bingham (Andrews) approaches him and reveals himself to be the sought after man, and Bingham takes James for a drive in his car. Bingham asks how much it would take to "cancel" his wife, and James replies $10,000. Bingham then reveals that he knows James' real identity, and even that it was he who reported the ad to the police. Bingham says that he will pay $500 for every client that James will bring to him of people who want their spouses to be killed. Meanwhile, Doris is having an affair with Robert Johnson (Dawson), but Robert doesn't even know her real identity after six months, much to his chagrin. Robert threatens to break up with her unless she commits, but she refuses, so he responds by seeking out James' classified advertisement address of Box 6128. Robert and James meet at the local stock exchange, but Robert knows few details about her other than her first name, height, eye color, and skin tone, but James realizes that he is the man that Robert wants killed. James demands $5,000 with half up front, which Robert readily agrees to, as he is hooked on Doris, and James tells Richard to formulate a list of everything he knows about her. James cannot believe that Robert would want a man killed that he doesn't even know, so James goes to Bingham and states his desire to have Robert himself killed. Bingham refuses to murder Robert as James appears so erratic about the issue, and Bingham tells James to do it himself in a state of insanity. James meets up again with Richard and gets the list Richard prepared, but James plays it off as Doris dominating him, not the other way around. James tells Richard to pay him directly as he will do the deed himself and gives him instructions to get Doris away from the home, when he finds the location. James goes back to Bingham, who applauds how James is steady and has lost his "petulant rage", and James orders Bingham to kill Doris before he does. Bingham visits Doris under the pretense of redecorating James' soundproof study, where Doris says James hides from her. She says that either the room goes or she does, so Bingham comments that James has already chosen and puts on leather gloves before attempting to strangle her. She fights back by biting his hand and smashing the chandelier against his head before locking him out of the study. Doris speaks of James' hatred for her and offers to pay Bingham more to leave her alone. James then breaks into the study and he and Doris speak of their issues, specifically what do about Bingham in the immediate and Robert afterward. Bingham waits outside with a silenced pistol and fires at anything making a sound. Richard, meanwhile, has arrived and fights Bingham, taking his gun and shooting him. It is then revealed to Richard that James is Doris' husband, and the three debate what to do. Richard gives Doris the gun, and Doris admonishes Richard for trying to kill James, as she was only angry with James, not filled with hatred. She tells Richard that they could never have the happiness that she has with James, as Richard does not understand wives. As James and Doris finally see eye-to-eye, she gives James the gun and calls the police on Richard for murdering Bingham. Supporting Cast: Edward Andrews as Bingham, Richard X. Slattery as Detective Barker, Robert Jacquin as Mr. Conelley (Editor), David Fresco as Waiter, Grant Woods as Man at Bar, George DeNormand as Man at Exchange (uncredited)
321	21	"Beast in View"	Joseph M. Newman	Margaret Millar (novel); James Bridges (teleplay)	Joan Hackett as Helen Clarvoe, Kevin McCarthy as Paul Blackshear	March 20, 1964
A woman thinks that her brother's ex-fiancëe is trying to kill her. At the Vicente Hotel, Helen Clarvoe receives an annoying phone call from Dorothy Johnson (Nolan), who threatens Helen for not giving her more of Helen' inheritance received from her father, as Dorothy was once engaged to Helen's brother Douglas. Helen then calls lawyer friend Paul Blackshear (McCarthy) to discuss the matter and show him Dorothy's demanding letter sent to Helen. Paul offers to find Dorothy and remedy the situation for Helen. He goes to Jack Terola Photography, where Jack (Furth) is photographing Robin Rath (Moffitt) with a cat. Jack orders male model Tommy Thompson (McBride) to answer the door and look after Paul, as Jack wants to keep filming. When finished, Jack details to Paul about Dorothy's erratic behavior in his studio and how he had to chase her out with a broom. He has since received a number of vulgar phone calls and begs Paul for help. Paul calls Helen to check on her and she finds a violent drawing placed under her door and notices someone standing outside her door, with a squeaky voice then demanding to be let inside. Paul finds Dorothy at her mother's apartment, and hungover Dorothy claims that Helen is making everything up. She blames Helen for breaking up her marriage, as Helen claims that Dorothy stole money from the Clarvoe family, and says that she hasn't spoken to Jack since her engagement. Paul then visits Helen's mother Verna (Forbes), who is playing cards by herself, when Helen calls to check in. After she hangs up, Dorothy calls Verna about Helen sending Paul to spread Helen's lies, especially about Dorothy supposedly stealing money. Helen leaves the hotel in a taxi while Dorothy follows, and Dorothy confronts her at a stoplight, so Helen flees on foot with Dorothy chasing her as the cab driver (Joyce) refuses to run the light. Helen hides in a bush to lose Dorothy. At Jack's shop, while he is preparing a picture in a darkroom, a voice claiming to be Dorothy claims to have money for him before shooting him with a gun. Paul and Verna play cards while waiting for Helen to arrive when a phone call comes through from Dorothy that details the chase through the park. The voice claims to have captured $200 from Helen's purse, which was given to Jack. Back at the studio, Robin and Tommy return from getting food and discover Jack's body. When Paul arrives and asks for Jack, Police Lieutenant Bromley (Conway) and a younger officer (Boyett) question Paul about Dorothy and Helen. At the lieutenant's urging, Paul calls the hotel, but the desk operator (Tovey) says that she hasn't yet returned. Just upon hanging up, Helen suddenly walks in, so the operator gives her messages from her mother. Verna receives another call from Dorothy, who claims to be with Helen at the hotel. The voice claiming to be Helen admits to lying about the money, and Verna calls Paul at the studio, leading he and the police to hurry to the hotel. Dorothy's voice claims to be busy, and a pistol shoots at the door when the police demand entry. Just then, the real Dorothy gets off the elevator and reveals that Helen has a gun and demanded that Dorothy wait at the end of the hall with Dorothy's voice. Helen then has a back-and-forth conversation with her "Dorothy-side" and Paul as well. Dorothy then speaks to Helen, claiming that she is the 'Dumb Dotty' that Helen taught multiplication, and Helen begs forgiveness from Dorothy. When Helen opens the door, though, she doesn't that Dorothy is there, as her father loved the "real Dorothy". Helen then sees various strange images when looking in the mirror and flashes back to her father (Anderson) complementing Dorothy, teaching Dorothy math, and Helen vandalizing Jack's studio. Helen realizes that it has been she committing the various acts, and she shoots the mirror shouting for the personality to go away. Paul and Bromley break in to put an end to the situation. Supporting Cast: George Furth as Jack Terola, Kathleen Nolan as Dorothy Johnson, Curt Conway as Lieutenant Bromley, Brenda Forbes as Verna Clarvoe, Peggy Moffitt as Robin Rath, Anthony McBride as Tommy Thompson, Len Hendry as Mr. Horner, Jimmy Joyce as Cab Driver, Bruce Andersen as Father, William Boyett as Young Policeman, George DeNormand as Man on Street (uncredited), Arthur Tovey as Man at Hotel Desk (uncredited) Note: The actress playing Margie the servant is uncredited and currently unknown.
322	22	"Behind the Locked Door"	Robert Douglas	Joel Murcott (teleplay)	Gloria Swanson as Mrs. Daniels, James MacArthur as Dave Snowden	March 27, 1964
A woman, Bonnie Daniels (Loring), is told by her mother (Swanson) that she will be cut off from her inheritance if she does not divorce her husband (MacArthur), whom the mother claims is a gold digger. Dave and Bonnie drive to her mother's home at night, only to be locked out, so Dave uses a flashlight to break a back window for entry. Little do they know that they are being watched by a neighbor, who drives away after they enter and contacts Mrs. Daniels. Dave and Bonnie discuss Dave's inferiority complex and Bonnie losing her father at the age of six. They tour the house by candlelight before finding one room locked off, which Dave wants to search but Bonnie wants to avoid. After starting a fire in the fireplace, they speak of Bonnie's mother being overprotective before Bonnie goes to sleep. Dave attempts to open the locked door, but he is surprised by Bonnie's mother, who was watching from the staircase. Mrs. Daniels threatens to annul the marriage, as Bonnie claimed to be nineteen but is in fact only a minor of seventeen years of age. Mrs. Daniels orders Dave away and says that annulment papers will be delivered to him, but he promises to get Bonnie back. Dave goes to meet Mrs. Daniels' attorney Adam Driscoll (Bissell), who promises Dave free college tuition and a job in order to leave Bonnie alone. Dave signs the annulment papers but says that he won't accept the money. On Bonnie's eighteenth birthday, she surprises Dave at his apartment and says that she wants him back, but Mrs. Daniels soon arrives and says that all Bonnie's wealth is held in trust until her twenty-fifth birthday. Dave kicks Mrs. Daniels out and tells her not to return, as he and Bonnie want to get remarried. Later on, Dave surprises Bonnie with a new car and says that he wants to drive to the house, but Bonnie correctly deduces that he wants to visit the locked room. They discuss living in poverty and vow to stay together. However, Dave soon surprises Bonnie with the news that he has been appointed to a position at a bank, one in which Mrs. Daniels holds much sway. Dave suggests Bonnie stage a suicide attempt to convince her mother to stay out of their affairs, but Bonnie is afraid to take so many sleeping pills. Dave instructs Bonnie how to write the suicide letter to Mrs. Daniels and when to take the four pills so that Mrs. Daniels will arrive before the ambulance. The plan does successfully get Mrs. Daniels to frantically arrive just before Dave enters, but Bonnie dies as she had rheumatic fever as a child, so even one barbiturate would have been enough to kill her. After the funeral, Dave is called by Mrs. Daniels to visit the office of Adam Driscoll, and Mrs. Daniels admits that all Bonnie's assets revert to her, as Bonnie predeceased her. However, as Mrs. Daniels knows that Bonnie loved him and that she should have let them be, Mrs. Daniels gives the house and property to Dave, to his delight. His first night at the house, he happily admits aloud that he just used Bonnie for her wealth, as Mrs. Daniels stealthily follows him and listens in. When Dave opens the locked room, he falls into a deep elevator shaft that was never completed, as Bonnie's father died. With his back broken and being unable to move, Mrs. Daniels appears and explains everything, and then she throws his house keys down the shaft to him, as he screams for help that will never come. Supporting Cast: Whit Bissell as Adam Driscoll, Lynn Loring as Bonnie Daniels
323	23	"A Matter of Murder"	David Lowell Rich	Boris Sobelman	Darren McGavin as Sheridan Westcott, Patricia Crowley as Enid Bentley, Telly Savalas as Philadelphia Harry	April 3, 1964
A carjacker, Philadelphia Harry (Savalas), steals a Rolls-Royce with a dead body inside it. Harry and his gang, consisting of his nephew Weldon (Rambeau), Al (Roarke), and Vinnie (Potash), follow the car being driven by Sheridan Westcott (McGavin) to a nearby lake. When Westcott gets out to check the depth of the lake, Harry's gang steals the vehicle and drives it to their hideout, where they discover a body in the trunk. Meanwhile, Sheridan tracks down a storeowner and states that his wife has been kidnapped. Westcott meets with Enid Bentley (Crowley) and a police lieutenant to discuss the details of the case, as Westcott noticed Harry's description. The lieutenant and assistant Harv (Bartlett) believe it to be Harry, but they believe that Harry would never kidnap someone, much less commit murder. When Harry orders the gang to return the car, he hears a radio broadcast seeking him and his gang. After the police leave, Westcott and Enid celebrate Westcott's wife Phoebe being dead, as they had planned. The lieutenant returns, however, as he is suspicious about Westcott and Enid, but they play innocent again. Harry decides to take the car to Westcott's garage so that he will get caught. Enid convinces Westcott to send a kidnapping note pretending to be Harry, in order to further fool the police. Harry returns the car that night, and Enid and Westcott demand $200,000 be released from Phoebe's estate by lawyer Mr. Flagstone (Wendell). When Enid goes to leave, she notices the stolen car has returned, and she and Westcott panic. They find a note pinned to the car about stealing being one thing, murder being another, so they hatch a plan to leave the car on a road somewhere as though Harry panicked. Harry collects local informant "General Delivery" (Wyenn), who is blindfolded to prevent him knowing their location, to send the police to Westcott's garage in exchange for fifty dollars. Westcott and Enid stage the car being repainted and drive it away just as the police arrive to check the now-empty garage. Weldon and Vinnie spot the painted Rolls and Enid's Jaguar driving to an area called Lookout Point, so they follow. After Westcott abandons the car, they steal it and take it back to Harry's garage. An initial celebration is met by shock as Harry opens the trunk to find Phoebe's body for the second time. Westcott and Enid perform for the lieutenant and Harv before rehearsing Westcott's role in dealing with fake kidnappers so that they can keep the money. Harry calls for a blindfolded General Delivery again to discuss what to do, and General Delivery demands ten dollars just for being there. Harry has a nightmare about the car, realizing why it was painted, so he calls business associate Lopez (Charles) to get rid of the car. After staging a frantic performance for the police with Enid, Westcott calls the police from a payphone about the car's location, not knowing that it has been taken once again. He also doesn't know that he is being followed by a police officer. The lieutenant meets with Police Captain J.X. Doran (T. McVey) to discuss the case before searching the house again. Westcott pretends to be extremely angry when the lieutenant says that they will dredge the lake, if necessary, even threatening to sue if nothing is found. After the police leave, Westcott and Enid celebrate, believing themselves to finally be home-free. Lopez, meanwhile, demands $100 to dispose of the car, which Harry reluctantly pays. Harry decides to dump the body in the lake as if they had never had possession at all, not knowing that the police will indeed search the lake the very next day and Westcott will finally be caught. Supporting Cast: Tyler McVey as Chief of Police Captain J.X. Doran, Adam Roarke as Al, Howard Wendell as Mr. Flagstone, Cal Bartlett as Harv, Marc Rambeau as Weldon, Paul Potash as Vinnie, Lewis Charles as Lopez, Patrick McVey as Police Lieutenant, Than Wyenn as General Delivery
324	24	"The Gentleman Caller"	Joseph M. Newman	James Bridges	Roddy McDowall as Gerald Musgrove, Ruth McDevitt as Miss Emmy Wright	April 10, 1964
A couple, Gerald (McDowall) and Milly Musgrove (Sayer), hide their stolen money in an old woman's high-rise apartment and their plan to have her committed backfires when the police are called. Musgrove breaks into a safe to steal over $100,000 and shoots a night watchman (Hendry) before he and Milly flee by car, which they abandon to split up, and Gerald joins a nightly singing meeting in the park led by Miss Emmy Wright (McDevitt) and attended by several others (Bennett, Bacon). Even Police Officer Petrie (Maxwell) joins them until police sirens scream in the area. Emmy speaks of enjoying the sound of Gerald's voice before reminiscing with him about when horses were everywhere in society and being alone. Gerald convinces absent-minded Emmy to cook him a meal of stew, so she takes a pot and two onions from neighbor Mrs. Jones (Moore), and landlady Mrs. Goldy collects rent and reminds her that she needs to clean up her apartment. Milly begs Gerald to let her spend some of the money, but ex-convict Gerald says no to avoid suspicion. Gerald dresses up and takes flowers and wine to his rendezvous with Emmy. After they drink some of the wine, Emmy falls asleep for a few moments, giving Gerald the idea of hiding his ill-gotten cash in her extensive magazine collection in her apartment. Gerald comes home to Milly playing with the money, and she pleads with him to spend the money. Gerald goes back for a meal of meatloaf and discusses mortality with his "Aunt" Emmy, but she is unconcerned as her parents lived into their nineties and a grandfather over one hundred and six years of age. He brings up her formulating a will, and she tells him to take what he wants when the time comes as she lives on Social Security and shares of a uranium stock. Gerald formulates a will leaving all her wealth to her church except her solid gold watch and "all the cash money found in her room", which will include the stolen loot. He then proceeds to stash the cash in her magazines when she leaves the room. He convinces her to take on a picnicking trip to the country. When she gets to the stairs, she looks down and gets vertigo. He attempts to push her down the stairs with his eyes closed, but she moves at the last moment, and he goes tumbling down the stairs instead. For the next visit, Gerald brings Milly to play the role of his cousin, but Emmy is admittedly jealous. They take a walk after dinner so that Gerald can set up Emmy to get hit by a car, but she is saved by a pedestrian (DeAngelo) and only breaks her leg. Emmy comes to strongly dislike Milly, who wastes too much, and she is aware that Milly does not like her either. Gerald and Milly next try to sabotage her gas stove in order to suffocate her, but the local gas corporation sends a man (Leavitt) and junk collector (Fawcett) to clean up Emmy's apartment. The junk collector takes all her magazines while the gas man calls the police, and when Gerald and Milly arrive, Emmy says that Milly turned on her gas to kill her and Milly says that it was all Gerald's idea. The police (Brown) take the two away as Emmy takes thousands of dollars out of magazines that she had hidden in her freezer all along. Supporting Cast: Frank Maxwell as Officer Petrie, Juanita Moore as Mrs. Jones, Naomi Stevens as Mrs. Goldy, Diane Sayer as Milly Musgrove, Norman Leavitt as Gas Company Man, Marjorie Bennett as Plump Lady, William Fawcett as Junk Collector, John A. Alonzo as Intern, Len Hendry as Night Watchman, Lew Brown as Policeman, Joe DeAngelo as Pedestrian, Walter Bacon as Citizen in Park (uncredited)
325	25	"The Ordeal of Mrs. Snow"	Robert Stevens	Alvin Sargent	Patricia Collinge as Adelaide Snow, Jessica Walter as Lorna Richmond	April 17, 1964
A man hatches a plot to keep his wife's rich aunt from exposing him. Adelaide Snow (Collinge) feeds her two Siamese cats while her niece Lorna (Walter) and Lorna's husband Bruce Richmond (Chastain) discuss living in rich Adelaide's home. Servant Frieda (Angold) tells Bruce that salesman Mr. Arthur (Gardino) has arrived to see Bruce about real estate. They meet in private and Arthur hounds Bruce regarding his gambling debts owed to Arthur's boss. Bruce escorts Arthur out before collecting a check from Aunt Addie and leaving for work, and Adelaide and Lorna then argue about Lorna's lack of access to the family's fortune. Adelaide then meets with her friend and financial advisor, Hillary Prine (Macready), about her handling of money recently. Later, butler Carl (Stevens) helps Lorna pack for a vacation in East Hampton, and Adelaide lets Frieda have some extra time off as well. Adelaide then discovers several checks for large sums made out to cash, which she identifies as forgery. When Bruce returns home, Adelaide confronts him about his past gambling debts that she paid off and also about the recently forged checks, which Bruce admits he signed out of desperation. Adelaide tries to call Lorna, but Bruce refuses to let her and locks her in the walk-in safe when she goes in to retrieve one of her cats. Just then, Bruce's friend John Wilson (Bartlett) arrives, and the two leave to meet Lorna and John's wife Sally (Curran). Adelaide tries to get out of the vault but realizes that Hillary will come looking for her later for dinner with his wife Ruth (Vincent). The Richmonds and Prines decide to go swimming, but Bruce lies to Lorna bout Adelaide going to Connecticut to stay with friends. Hillary and Ruth arrive but get no answer from ringing the doorbell, as the staff has already left and Adelaide is trapped. Ruth is unconcerned but Hillary worries about receiving no notice from Adelaide whatsoever. The Prines go to dinner, and Hillary calls Lorna from the restaurant, but Lorna knows only to give him Bruce's fabrication. Adelaide tries to sing a song taught to her by her late husband Henry but fails to remember the words with the lack of oxygen available. Lorna concerns herself with the wellbeing of Adelaide's cats and finds the envelope of forged checks that Bruce stuck in his pockets, which angers Bruce greatly. He covers by saying that he is balancing the checkbook for Adelaide instead of Hillary, but he drops one of the checks into the laundry basket. Adelaide, meanwhile, finds some paper, so she tears it into pieces to spell out that Bruce is responsible. At a party later, drinks are spilled on Lorna's dress, and she finds the dropped check while cleaning her dress. She then calls the Connecticut residence where Bruce said Adelaide was heading but gets no answer, so she calls another resident and finds out that the friends are in Europe. Sally checks in on Lorna and then tells Bruce that Lorna is making phone calls, so he suspiciously goes to get her, refusing to let her be alone. The Prines introduce Bruce to Harvey Crane (Robinson), giving Lorna the opportunity to get to her car. Bruce catches her and refuses to let her leave for New York alone, so he shoves her over and drives. Supporting Cast: Don Chastain as Bruce Richmond, George Macready as Hillary Prine, June Vincent as Ruth Prine, Bartlett Robinson as Harvey Crane, Cal Bartlett as John Wilson, Pamela Curran as Sally Wilson, Edit Angold as Frieda, Danny Gardino as Mr. Arthur, Bert L. Stevens as Carl the Butler (uncredited)
326	26	"Ten Minutes from Now"	Alf Kjellin	Arthur A. Ross (teleplay); Jack Ritchie (short story)	Donnelly Rhodes as James Bellington, Lou Jacobi as Dr. Glover	May 1, 1964
A newscaster (Williams) interviews Parks Commissioner Thomas Grindley (Kirkpatrick) about receiving a string of three letters consisting of bomb threats centered on him and his authority. Police officers (Peck) notice a suspicious man with a package and call the Park Commission Secretary (Gould) just before the angry package-holder, James Bellington (Rhodes), arrives, demanding to see the parks commissioner. However, Police Lieutenant Wymar (Chapman) arrivers instead, and upon hearing the package ticking, wrestles the package away from Bellington before drowning it in a sink of water. The police capture Bellington and talk with him about his attached letter and his reasoning for wanting to see the commissioner, but the bomb squad officer (Pope) reveals that the package has only an ordinary clock. Wymar detains Bellington nonetheless, as the law allows for eight hours detainment before charges must be filed. Police psychiatrist Dr. Glover (Jacobi) interviews Bellington, who reveals himself as a struggling artist who constantly faces rejection. The police search Bellington's hotel room, while Glover examines his use of color and heightened technique and outlines Bellington's paranoia to Wymar. Glover is worried that when Bellington notices that people have been in his room, he might indeed snap and create a real bomb. Meanwhile, Bellington buys some minor equipment that could be used for bombmaking from a local hardware salesman (Ayer) before noticing that the police are following him. Bellington flees, and the detective (Zeigler) following him calls in after he loses Bellington on the street. Soon, a messenger (Franke) stops by at the museum with a package from Bellington, and the police scramble. Inside, however, Bellington is listening to a museum guide (Lamont) speak before stopping to talk with a patron (Harford) in order to hide from the searching police. Bellington talks the patron into carrying his described "case of paints" and attempts to flee, but Wymar spots him, and the woman turns over the package when Wymar mentions the word "bomb". Outside, Bellington is allowed to empty the contents, which are revealed to merely be basic painting equipment. Glover and Wymar discuss whether Bellington will finally make the real thing, and Glover believes that he will eventually. Sergeant Louise Marklen (Adams) is called in by Glover to make and keep contact with Bellington, and she carries a voice recorder for help. Marklen makes contact with Bellington at a local bar by pretending to admire his "making the big boys sweat". His paranoia makes her try to prove that she is a secretary at a building company, and she pretends to be a lonely wife who hates her husband and job. He claims to have the perfect plan figured out, a "smooth, black, efficient button" that will destroy everything if he lets it go before he gets what he wants. She drops her purse, and he discovers the recorder and destroys the tape. The next day, Bellington arrives with a package containing a black button on the lid, and Wymar, Glover, and the bomb squad officer chase him with a retinue of police officers. However, Bellington makes it into a nearby museum and is cornered on the stairs. He says that he will release the button in ten minutes, chanting repeatedly "words, a father to the deed" and "there are no victories, only protests", and the police empty the building of patrons. Bellington allows the patrons to leave and orders all authority figures out of "his" museum. After everyone leaves, it is revealed that two art thieves (Carradine, Mallory) and an assistant (Kirk) are replacing the expensive museum paintings with copies painted by Bellington himself. Afterward, he goes outside to reveal that the box has only an alarm clock and a coil of wire. Bellington threatens to sue the police if they arrest him, as he has not broken any law or actually committed any crime. He throws the box into the trash and walks away a free man. Supporting Cast: David Carradine as Art Thief (uncredited), Neile Adams as Sergeant Louise Marklen, Jess Kirkpatrick as Parks Commissioner Thomas Grindley, Lonny Chapman as Lieutenant Wymar, Sandra Gould as Park Commission Secretary, Ed Peck as Policeman, Betty Harford as Museum Patron, Edward Mallory as The Thief, Vince Williams as Newscaster, Hinton Pope as Bomb Squad Officer, John W. Zeigler as Detective, Harold Ayer as Hardware Salesman, Tony Franke as The Messenger, Syl Lamont as Museum Guide, Tommy Kirk as Thief's Assistant (uncredited)
327	27	"The Sign of Satan"	Robert Douglas	Barre Lyndon (teleplay); Robert Bloch (Return to the Sabbath short story)	Christopher Lee as Karl Jorla, Gia Scala as Kitty Frazier	May 8, 1964
A recording of Karl Jorla (Lee) leading a black mass with his acolytes (Ebersberg, Jacoby, Forst, Friedel) before being stabbed and burned is viewed by lead actress Kitty Frazier (Scala) and studio executives Dave Connor (Healey), Max Rubini (Green), and Ed Walsh (Roarke). Rubini and Dave are especially excited to hire Jorla to lead Rubini's new monster movie, but they believe that Jorla is hiding in Paris, which is where Dave bought the smuggled tape from the director. At the opening of filming, Jorla is brought on set by Dave but heavily fears any publicity from present photographers (Meader). Jorla claims that the film was indeed a black mass and that the sign of Satan is found all around the world. Jorla is disturbed that he has the leading role in Rubini's film, as he believed that he would be in heavy makeup in a small role. He believes that the cult of devil worshipers is out to kill him and therefore his location must be hidden. Dave attempts to calm him by showing him his set bungalow and escort him to the Beverly Savoy Hotel. The next day, they call Jorla at the hotel only to find out that he has already checked out, but he is found on set with Kitty going over the set design, with Jorla transfixed on a statue of the devil's eye. Jorla claims that he left the hotel because he is being followed by worshippers of the devil, so Rubini orders a police officer (Gorss) to be present with Jorla at all times. A letter soon arrives stating that the director of the smuggled black mass film was found strangled in Paris, and Jorla retreats to hide in his bungalow. Jorla awakens just as an acolyte is attempting to stab him with a sacrificial knife. They struggle until the studio police officer breaks in and disarms the intruder. Rubini arranges for Police Captain Hartzell (Keith) to escort Jorla everywhere, but Jorla believes that he is safer only when he is alone; he pledges to be at the studio every morning ready to work. At a movie photo shoot, Dave and Walsh discuss where Jorla leaves for at night while the script girl (Brick) delivers an autopsy report on the dead director, Fritz Ullman. Rubini orders Dave to follow Jorla, and Dave successfully trails Jorla's car until it is abandoned for a taxi commute. Jorla is nowhere to be found for the next three days, so they film around him while hoping that he will return. When Kitty begins her speech, the movie tomb opens slightly to reveal Jorla, and Rubini is delighted. When they cut the scene and open the door, Jorla is nowhere to be found. When they review the footage, though, Jorla is not on the tape. The script girl mentions what Jorla stated, and Kitty realizes that he said an address in Topanga Canyon. At the address mentioned, Jorla's body is determined by the police inspector (DeNormand) to have been dead for at least three days. Supporting Cast: Myron Healey as Dave Connor, Gilbert Green as Max Rubini, Adam Roarke as Ed Walsh, Byron Keith as Captain Hartzell, Sol Gorss as Studio Policeman, Nicki Brick as Script Girl, Horst Ebersberg as First Acolyte, Dieter Jacoby as Second Acolyte, Eric Forst as Third Acolyte, Walter Friedel as Fourth Acolyte, George DeNormand as Police Inspector (uncredited), William Meader as Photographer (uncredited)
328	28	"Who Needs an Enemy?"	Harry Morgan	Arthur A. Ross	Steven Hill as Charlie Osgood, Richard Anderson as Eddie Turtin, Joanna Moore as Danielle	May 15, 1964
A dishonest man, Charlie Osgood (Hill), finds a way to avoid prosecution. Charlie goes to his office at 5:15 in the morning to change some accounting books but is caught by partner Eddie Turtin (Anderson), who was his close friend from the war. Eddie calls out Charlie for frequently coming in after hours to steal money for his new car and expensive girlfriend and pulls a revolver on him demanding that the money be returned, or he will have him prosecuted and imprisoned for thirty to forty years. Charlie always makes money even though Eddie often barely breaks even, and Charlie admits that he can't return the money (currently $60,000) as he has already spent it. Charlie goes home to complain to fiancée Danielle, but she only offers to make him breakfast. He tells her that the money is only borrowed, not stolen, and laments that Eddie has no patience for his mistakes. Charlie comes to the conclusion to kill Eddie by cutting his car's steering bar in order to run over Eddie "accidentally" and then blame Eddie for the thefts. Charlie indeed tries his plan but his car slams into the back of a police car, and he is arrested. Charlie then decides to stage a fake suicide for himself with dynamite so the entire case will just go away. He writes a suicide letter to Danielle and then goes to see Eddie at midnight to admit to stealing the money and ask for personal forgiveness before stating that he will soon be dead and fleeing the office. He drives to the docks with rope, a bag if dynamite, and a dummy dressed in his clothing tied to the rope. He throws the bag overboard and yells to nearby people (Baxley, Rose, Carroll) to stop "the man" from jumping, but he personally tackles the nearest man and pushes the dummy over the side. A police officer interviews the witnesses but Charlie drives away while everyone is distracted. Eddie calls Danielle several times about Charlie's whereabouts just before Charlie returns to celebrate the success thus far. Danielle wants to leave immediately but he says that she must attend the funeral, and she must handle questions from the district attorney, the police, and others. At the funeral, a funeral usher (Bradley) instructs Eddie when to deliver the eulogy, and Eddie praises Charlie for being noble, pure, and never letting people down in a time of crisis, even though he is conflicted about the money being gone. Danielle reveals that the police found the laundry bag used to stage the suicide just as the police detective (Phillips) arrives to question her about her possessions being used by Charlie and why weights were attached if he blew himself up with explosives. Danielle thinks that the police now believe that she killed Charlie, as they ask her if she has a lawyer, and Charlie says that he will take care of it, as they are now partners. Charlie disguises himself and calls Danielle several times when he gets the passport, exit visas, and plane tickets, but he continually claims that he cannot get the money without her help. She loses her police tail and disguises herself to join him in order to retrieve the money at Charlie's old office, where the money was hidden all along. He hid the money in the file marked "M", for money. They go to toast with Eddie's bourbon, but Charlie collapses after drinking as the bottle was poisoned. Charlie awakens tied up to see that Eddie and Danielle are now working together, and Danielle reveals that she knows that Charlie has betrayed many women in the past. They take Charlie to the docks where he staged his suicide and throw him over the side while tied up with dynamite, and he explodes soon after going under. Supporting Cast: Barney Phillips as First Detective, Paul Baxley as Man, Wally Rose as Man, Dee Carroll as Woman, Paul Bradley as Funeral Usher (uncredited)
329	29	"Bed of Roses"	Philip Leacock	James Bridges	Patrick O'Neal as George Maxwell, Kathie Browne as Mavis Maxwell	May 22, 1964
During a strong windstorm at midnight, George Maxwell (O'Neal) checks in on his newlywed sleeping wife Mavis (Browne) before failing to open his garage, so he walks until catching a cab driven by Sam Kirby (Lindsey), who fuses with him about George having only large denominations of cash. George lets Sam keep the entire twenty dollars, to Sam's astonishment, and George goes inside the house he attempted to telephone from home, only to find his show girl mistress, Adele Beaumont, dead on the couch. He flees and returns home on foot, sneaking into bed to avoid waking his wife. The next morning, he reads the newspaper discussing the woman's death as servant Celeste (Myers) serves him and Mavis breakfast. Mavis' father and George's employer Alva Hardwicke (Thatcher) arrives to eat as George decides to leave for work, though he still cannot enter his electrically operated garage. Alva drives George to work and Alva speaks of a man's eye wandering and the need for discretion, and he all but threatens George to never hurt the simple yet beautiful Mavis. George's secretary Martha Hinchley (Backes) tries to serve him optimism and beverages, but he declines to review pictures of and a letter from dead girlfriend Adele. Suddenly, Martha brings in a letter with cash and says that a man, taxicab driver Sam, has arrived and expects to be seen. Sam gives George change from the previous night's fare and reads the article discussing the search for a cab driver that was seen dropping off a man at the home of the murder victim. George inquires how much Sam wants, and Sam mentions having a home across the lake that would cost around $1,000 per month. He gives George until 6:00 PM to make up his mind and threatens to involve Alva if necessary. Mavis and yard worker William (Walker) are digging in the garden when George arrives home, having ridden the bus. George admits that he is being extorted by Sam and also mentions his past relationship with Adele. Mavis refuses to let George call the police, as she will not face the societal embarrassment but instead would rather pay the blackmail. George burns the photos of Adele in addition to the desperate letter she wrote him about needing money. At the bar where Sam waits and drinks, he talks with drunkard Lulu (Griffies), who pleads with bartender Pedro (Reiner) for more booze. George invites Sam to his house after midnight, as there will be guests there earlier in the evening. For dinner that evening, Mavis and George host Alva and Mavis's mother Eda Faye (Frost) as Sam waits. After they leave, George and Sam play pool while they wait for Mavis. Mavis arrives and offers Sam coffee and cookies, but when Sam lifts the sheet on the cookie tray, Mavis' hand rests there with a revolver, and she promptly shoots Sam to George's shock. George is frozen with fear, but Mavis only worries about the blood staining the pool table felt. They bury Sam in the yard where William had dug the hole earlier for the rose trees being planted. They ditch Sam's cab, but on the ride home George figures out that Mavis killed Adele, to which Mavis readily admits as she won't share George with anyone, and that Mavis purposefully broke the garage door. Days later, Mavis notes how the new roses are the reddest that she's ever seen. At work, George reads the newspaper before Martha requests a raise and more attention from George, as she knows the identity of Sam and recorded the conversation of George and Sam (which is being stored in a bank safety deposit box) because Alva demanded that the office be bugged. George invites Martha to lunch at his home, and then he calls Mavis to get the molasses cookies ready and have a hole dug for more roses. Supporting Cast: George Lindsey as Sam Kirby, Torin Thatcher as Alva Hardwicke, Alice Frost as Eda Faye Hardwicke, Alice Backes as Martha Hinchley, Paulene Myers as Celeste, Bill Walker as William, Ethel Griffies as Lulu, Robert Reiner as Pedro the Bartender
330	30	"The Second Verdict"	Lewis Teague	Alfred Hayes (teleplay); Henry Slesar (story)	Martin Landau as Edward 'Ned' Murray, Frank Gorshin as Lew Rydell, Nancy Kovack as Karen Osterman	May 29, 1964
A bailiff (Guizon) opens a door for the jury to enter after deliberating in a murder case, Judge Arthur (Hale) instructs the jury foreman (Remick) to release its verdict, and the verdict of not guilty satisfies defense attorney Ned Murray (Landau), defendant Lew Rydell (Gorshin), and Rydell's wife Melanie (Ferrell). Ned offers to celebrate, but Melanie says that Lew doesn't drink or gamble, although he smokes cigarettes a plenty. In Ned's office, Rydell talks about Melanie's propensity of driving men wild before happily admitting to the murder of the delivery boy for which he was found not guilty. Law partner Mr. Osterman (Stone) speaks with daughter Karen Osterman (Kovack), Ned's fiancée, about his amazing job securing a not guilty verdict. After court the next day, Ned receives a visit from old friend Tony Hardeman (Marley), who offers to repay a favor to Ned for past services. Ned then goes to the Rydells' apartment and speaks with Melanie, as Lew is out seeing a former employer. Ned asks Melanie about Lew's jealousy and Lew wanting to teach the boy a lesson, which Ned tells Melanie is why Lew committed murder. Ned tells Melanie to button her loose housecoat just before Lew arrives, relieved somewhat that her coat is buttoned. The next day, Mr. Osterman calls Ned into his office, as Lew stews that Ned told Melanie that Lew was guilty and threatens a lawsuit. Osterman tells Ned that it doesn't matter if Lew committed murder or not, as he is an attorney. That night, Karen visits Ned with a gift in the form of a pipe and asks Ned not to tell the district attorney about Lew's admission, as Osterman has threatened to kick Ned out of the firm. Ned refuses to back down, so Karen attempts to take off her engagement ring and leaves. Ned passes out after drinking heavily and is awakened by Tony, who fixes Ned some coffee and listens to Ned's concern about Lew. Tony offers to take care of everything, as there is no double jeopardy in his line of business, and he tells Ned to make everything right with Osterman, as Lew has taken "a slow boat for his health". The next day, Osterman tells Ned to go to the district attorney and ignore everything he said the day before, but Ned says that he isn't going to discuss the issue any further. Ned tries to reach Tony but fails, so he calls the Rydell apartment, although when Melanie says "hello" he hangs up. This makes Lew extremely paranoid and suspicious, and he threatens to break Melanie's neck like he did with the delivery boy. When Lew opens the window, he sees Tony staring at him from the street, so he forces Melanie to signal Tony to come up. Meanwhile, Judge Arthur's maid Hilda (Mayon) leads Ned into the judge's office, and Ned reveals Lew's confession, which the judge sees as an ethical riddle. The judge suggests that Lew may be legally insane and that he would have sentenced him to an asylum, although Ned proclaims that it was first-degree murder. Ned takes a taxi to the Rydell apartment, but Tony arrives first, and gunshots are heard. Ned arrives as Tony's body is being taken by paramedics and Lew is being led out in handcuffs, with police detective Tom Bailey (Beirne) suggesting that Lew needs a straitjacket. Ned tells Tom that is exactly what he will try to get Lew this time. Supporting Cast: John Marley as Tony Hardeman, Harold J. Stone as Mr. H.E. Osterman, Richard Hale as Judge Lincoln Arthur, Sharon Ferrell as Melanie Rydell, Michael Beirne as Tom Bailey, William Remick as Jury Foreman, Richard Guizon as Bailiff, Helen Mayon as Hilda the Maid
331	31	"Isabel"	Alf Kjellin	William Fay (teleplay); S.B. Hough (novel); Henry Slesar (teleplay)	Bradford Dillman as Howard Clements, Barbara Barrie as Isabel Smith	June 5, 1964
Spinster Isabel Smith is walking along a road late at night when she is attacked. Howard Clements (Dillman) had previously passed her on the street and shortly thereafter is detained by police officers (Marshall), who take him to see Lieutenant John Huntley (Ryan) at Isabel's house. Isabel, with the support of friend Martha (Lloyd), identifies Howard as the attacker, so he is arrested. Defense attorney Mr. Selby (Tremayne), who has known Isabel for years, outlines the case for Howard, as he was in the area, tore his pants after falling, and is an outsider to the area. Selby says that Isabel wanted it to happen and picked Howard, as she remembered his face. Howard is found guilty and sentenced by the judge (Woolf King) to serve from one-to-five years under the prison warden (Patterson). After serving his time, Howard begins his criminal career by robbing a bank messenger leaving a bank. Once he collects what he feels he is owed ($15,000) for working during his prison sentence, he mails the remaining money back to the bank. He then buys a bus ticket and travels back to the town, Lewisburg, where he was originally arrested. He confronts Isabel, who tries to have police officer Finley (Falk) arrest him, but no charge can be found to apply. Howard opens a records store, and Isabel goes there to apologize, with the two of them becoming amicable. Isabel starts to fall for Howard, as she purposefully buys records she already has so that she can return them and buy others. Howard invites Isabel to a musical performance, and Isabel reluctantly accepts. Lieutenant Huntley goes to see Isabel and questions her about the relationship with Howard, as he was a friend to her father and is worried, but Isabel and Howard seemingly grow closer and closer. Isabel confronts herself about whether she was wrong that night she was attacked, even though Howard tells her they can simply move on. Howard tells her he is innocent but shows contempt in his eyes when he holds her. Huntley goes to warn Isabel again, but Isabel believes that Huntley is just reverting to seeing her as an ugly duckling, which is what she heard her father call her long before with Huntley. Howard arrives and reveals that he and Isabel are getting married at the end of the week. Huntley receives a piece of the wedding cake, as promised by Howard, but Huntley confides in Sergeant Lou Snyder (Coleman) that he is curious about the origins of Howard's wealth, as he had lived rather spartanly before his arrest and could not have much money while in prison. He calls a friend, Dan Gordon, at the local bank and is told that Howard deposited $13,000 cash in large bills at one time. Huntley and Snyder discuss the robbery of the bank messenger that had occurred beforehand and the money that was mailed back, and Howard believes that the only conclusion is that Howard intends to kill Isabel, as she has little money and is losing more daily with her failing school. Howard and Isabel take a boat trip while on their honeymoon, and when back on shore a sailor (Lewis) discusses with Howard about people having accidents off the coast, to Howard's great interest. Howard goes to the local library to read about boating accident causes. He then sets the boat up to fail as the one in the story did, hoping for a great explosion. He goes back to the honeymoon suite to tell Isabel that he must go back and meet a businessman about opening a second shop, but he encourages her to take the boat out herself. When Isabel switches the fuel tank from port to starboard, the boat explodes as planned, killing Isabel. Huntley then goes to pressure Howard and openly accuses him of murder, and Howard acts coldly and displays no emotion. Huntley suddenly gets a call that Isabel was thrown clear from the explosion and is in good health, having been found by a fisherman. Huntley then tells Howard that marriage is better than going back to prison, and Isabel loves Howard as he is, so he better accept being a good husband. Isabel then bursts into the room, and Howard reluctantly hugs her, therefore signaling to Huntley that he accepts his place. Supporting Cast: Dabney Coleman as Sergeant Lou Snyder, Edmon Ryan as Lieutenant John Huntley, Doris Lloyd as Martha, Les Tremayne as Mr. Selby, Don Marshall as Officer Healy, Ricks Falk as Officer Finley, Walter Woolf King as Judge, Forrest Lewis as Sailor, Kenneth Patterson as Warden, Lou Byrne as Librarian
332	32	"Body in the Barn"	Joseph M. Newman	Harold Swanton	Lillian Gish as Bessie Carnby, Maggie McNamara as Camilla	July 3, 1964
At the Summerfield Farm, an auction company takes items to fulfill legal bills, with Mr. Huckaby (Andersen) and his assistant (Kuenstle) evaluate various items. Bessie Carnby then narrates her desire to make two lies become a truth. She runs to locate where a body was found on her property, as Sheriff Turnbull (Thordsen), his deputy (Niles), and Samantha Wilkins (Cutts) discuss how the body got there. When Bessie arrives with her niece, Camilla (McNamara), Bessie and Samantha argue about the fence put near where the body was found. Bessie collapses, so Henry Wilkins (Hayes) carries her to bed to rest. Bessie and Henry get along quite well, as Henry didn't want the fence to be put up, but Bessie and Samantha fight constantly. Dr. Adamson (Smith) arrives to check on Bessie and accuses her of drinking alcoholic beverage applejack. Meanwhile, Samantha reads a newspaper article about the controversial fence as servant Nora (Lloyd) finishes her duties. Bessie invites Henry over for dinner, but Samantha refuses to let Henry go, and she has complete control as she owns everything. Camilla tells Bessie that Henry is deathly afraid of Samantha, as she once shot a pistol at him but missed, and they watch Samantha come and go from the barn on several occasions. Camilla convinces Bessie to invite Samantha over as well, but when they get to the Wilkins farm, Samantha tells them that Henry has suddenly left, and she doesn't know if or when he will return. Over the next ten days, Bessie's health continues to get worse, and Dr. Adamson says that all they can do is treat the pain, as he says that she may only have six months to live. Bessie and Camilla invite Nora over to offer her parttime work, but Nora admits that Henry left without packing any clothes whatsoever, much less his reading glasses or toothbrush. Bessie and Camilla then visit the sheriff's office, but he shrugs them off, even though no one has heard from Henry at all. Twenty days from Henry's disappearance, Bessie and Camilla visit Samantha again, at first to apologize, but then Bessie quickly pushes for information as to how Henry supposedly left, and Samantha says that he flew by airplane. Bessie sneaks onto the Wilkins property to snoop around at night, and she is almost caught due to the Wilkins' dog Penny. Bessie makes it to the barn and uses a flashlight to find a body. The next day, police arrive with townsfolk to get the body, and Henry's ring is found, along with a button. The sheriff calls in local storekeeper Ed (Maloney) about Henry buying quicklime. Samantha tells the sheriff and doctor that she and Henry quarreled often but had discussed the matter the very night that he left, as Henry felt that he needed to go prove himself. Later around Easter, a radio broadcast reveals that Samantha was executed for the murder of Henry, although she proclaimed her innocence until the end. Suddenly, Henry appears in Bessie's bedroom, revealing that he had traveled all over the world and has a bottle of brandy from France. Henry is unaware about Samantha's prosecution and death. Henry returns home to find Camilla vacuuming, and they embrace romantically. Bessie and Dr. Adamson both blame each other for Samantha's death, as the doctor missed the physical differences between Henry and the dead body, which was that of the old man named F. Judge who was found at the beginning. Henry tears down the hated barbwire fence. Bessie wants Henry to turn himself in, but Henry tells Bessie that she killed Samantha. Camilla announces that she and Henry are to be married, which is why they tore down the fence. Sheriff Turnbull says that no one wants to take on Henry again, but Bessie says that Henry wants to kill her because she has taken the farm away from Camilla in her will and has manipulated her medicine. Dr. Adamson gives Bessie's morphine prescription to Henry, who promises to get it filled for her. Bessie stages her bedroom by hiding a letter and drugging her brandy bottle with morphine before calling up Henry to offer an apology. She gets Henry to give her some of the drugged brandy before dying. The letter is almost lost until Huckaby's assistant finds it. Later, funeral director Gregg (Weaver) leads Camilla to a vehicle being by driven a driver (Roberts) to Henry's funeral, as the letter and bottle secured his conviction and death sentence. Supporting Cast: Patricia Cutts as Samantha Wilkins, Peter Lind Hayes as Henry Wilkins, Kelly Thordsen as Sheriff Pate O. Turnbull, Kent Smith as Dr. Sam Adamson, Josie Lloyd as Nora, Doodles Weaver as Gregg, Bruce Andersen as Mr. Huckaby, James Maloney as Ed the Storekeeper, Richard Niles as Deputy, Charles Kuenstle as Huckaby's Assistant, Ralph Roberts as Driver Originally scheduled for November 22, 1963; the episode was delayed due to the assassination of John F. Kennedy that occurred that day.
