= List of Ben Casey episodes =

Ben Casey is an American medical drama series which ran on ABC from 1961 to 1966. The show was known for its opening titles, which consisted of a hand drawing the symbols "♂, ♀, ✳, †, ∞" on a chalkboard, as cast member Sam Jaffe intoned, "Man, woman, birth, death, infinity.". The series starred Vincent Edwards, with co-star Sam Jaffe (seasons 1–4), Don Spruance (seasons 1–3), Franchot Tone (season 5) and Gregory Morton (season 5). Harry Landers, Bettye Ackerman, Nick Dennis and Jeanne Bates were supporting regulars who appeared in a majority of episodes over the five seasons.

== Series overview ==
Season	Episodes	Originally released	
Season	Episodes	First released	Last released
1	32	October 2, 1961	May 28, 1962
2	31	October 1, 1962	May 13, 1963
3	33	September 9, 1963	April 22, 1964
4	31	September 14, 1964	May 17, 1965
5	26	September 13, 1965	March 21, 1966

== Episodes ==
=== Season 1 (1961–62) ===
No. overall	No. in season	Title	Directed by	Written by	Original release date
1	1	"To the Pure"	Fielder Cook	James E. Moser	October 2, 1961
starring Vincent Edwards as Dr. Ben Casey, Sam Jaffe as Dr. David Zorba. Harry Landers as Dr. Ted Hoffman, Bettye Ackerman as Maggie Graham, Jeanne Bates as Miss Wills, Aki Aleong as Nobby. Bart Heyman as Dr. Paul Cain, Rafael Lopez as Pete Salazar, Angela Clarke as Mrs. Salazar, Maurice Manson as Dr. Harold Jensen, Adrienne Hayes as Dorothy Wilmer, Ann Morrison as Mrs. Wilmer. Francis DeSales, Stuart Nisbet, Wilton Graff, Susan Davis, Nelson Olmsted, Maudie Prickett, Adrienne Marden. Uncredited: Bert Stevens [man in restaurant] Ben Casey jeopardizes his career in order to perform a delicate brain operation on a young boy.
2	2	"But Linda Only Smiled"	Abner Biberman	William Bast	October 9, 1961
starring Vincent Edwards as Dr. Ben Casey, Sam Jaffe as Dr. David Zorba. Harry Landers as Dr. Ted Hoffman, Bettye Ackerman as Maggie Graham, Jeanne Bates as Miss Wills. Jeanne Cooper as Linda. Stanja Lowe as Mrs. Reed, Susan Gordon as Kathy Reed. Bernard Kates as Dr. Murphy, John Zaremba as Dr. Jensen, Barton Heyman as Dr. Cain, Robert B. Williams as Mr. Hodges. Charles Irving, Mary Gregory, Lorraine Martin, Leslie Summers. Uncredited: Michele Lee [nurse at neurological ward station] Dr. Casey administers a blood transfusion on a critically ill child, despite the religious objections of her mother.
3	3	"The Insolent Heart"	Alex March	Al C. Ward	October 16, 1961
starring Vincent Edwards as Dr. Ben Casey, Sam Jaffe as Dr. David Zorba. Harry Landers as Dr. Ted Hoffman, Bettye Ackerman as Maggie Graham, Nick Dennis as Nick. Guest Star Luther Adler as Dr. Michael Waldman. Carl Benton Reid as Dean Alfred Norris, Robert Burton as Dr. Ralph Keel, Don Spruance as Dr. John Ward, George Dunn as Jim Wilkins, Nita Loveless as Nurse Lane. Mary Gregory, Carolyn Fleming, Art Passarella, Leslie Summers and David Lewis as Dr. Paul Wolf. Uncredited: Bess Flowers [guest at party] Dr. Casey is reluctant to perform experimental surgery on his former instructor, who has heart disease. Also a friend of Dr. Zorba, the instructor insists on having the operation.
4	4	"I Remember a Lemon Tree"	Alex March	Story by : Marcus W. Demian; Teleplay by : Jack Laird	October 23, 1961
starring Vincent Edwards as Dr. Ben Casey, Sam Jaffe as Dr. David Zorba. Harry Landers as Dr. Ted Hoffman, Bettye Ackerman as Maggie Graham, Nick Dennis as Nick, Jeanne Bates as Miss Wills. Guest Stars George C. Scott as Dr. Karl Anders. Colleen Dewhurst as Phyllis Anders. John Zaremba as Dr. Harold Jensen, Barton Heyman as Dr. Cain, Alice Rodriguez as Nurse Hendrix. A brilliant surgeon has developed a drug habit while battling leukemia, and is now forging prescriptions of morphine for his own use.
5	5	"An Expensive Glass of Water"	Robert Ellis Miller	Gilbert Ralston	October 30, 1961
starring Vincent Edwards as Dr. Ben Casey, Sam Jaffe as Dr. David Zorba. Harry Landers as Dr. Ted Hoffman, Bettye Ackerman as Maggie Graham, Jeanne Bates as Miss Wills. Guest Star Chester Morris as Walter Tyson. Neva Patterson as Frederica, Shirley Ballard as Wiletta Tyson. John Zaremba as Dr. Harold Jensen, George Neise as George Baxter, Herb Armstrong as Joe Weiss, Ken Becker as Bill Johnson. Thom Carney, Barbara Collentine, Richard Keith, Mary Patton. Uncredited (in order of appearance): Noble Chissell [worker], Eric Morris [patient] A business tycoon battles with Dr. Casey in an effort to keep the seriousness of his physical condition a secret from his competitors.
6	6	"The Sound of Laughter"	Irving Lerner	Gilbert Ralston	November 6, 1961
starring Vincent Edwards as Dr. Ben Casey. Harry Landers as Dr. Ted Hoffman, Bettye Ackerman as Maggie Graham, Nick Dennis as Nick, Jeanne Bates as Miss Wills. Stanley Adams as Tony Romano, Ruth Storey as Leona Romano, Edward Colmans as Anselmo Pugliese, Ernest Anderson as Matty Phipps, Anna Bruno-Lena as Gina. Ned Glass, Jack Mather, John Pickard, Roxanne Brooks, Patricia King, Karen Norris, Tom Pardew. Children's laughter gives needed therapy to an ailing entertainer who is paralyzed after a cranial seizure.
7	7	"A Few Brief Lines for Dave"	Byron Paul	Story by : Paul Savage; Teleplay by : Al C. Ward	November 13, 1961
starring Vincent Edwards as Dr. Ben Casey. Sam Jaffe as Dr. David Zorba. Harry Landers as Dr. Ted Hoffman, Bettye Ackerman as Maggie Graham, Nick Dennis as Nick, Jeanne Bates as Miss Wills. Guest Star Kevin McCarthy as Dr. Dave Taylor. Co-starring Phyllis Love as Elizabeth Collins. Herbert Patterson as Dr. John Chambers, Don Spruance as Dr. Robert Ward, Mary Gregory as Miss Wilson, Meg Wyllie as Mrs. Storey, Frank Kreig as Mr. Mooney. Jean MacRae, Lon Dean, Richard Vath, Lou Byrne, Theona Bryant, Bill Bixby, Florence Sayner, James Wright. A malingering female patient and a fear-ridden resident surgeon pose problems for Dr. Casey.
8	8	"Pavanne for a Gentle Lady"	Abner Biberman	Theodore Apstein	November 20, 1961
starring Vincent Edwards as Dr. Ben Casey. Sam Jaffe as Dr. David Zorba. Harry Landers as Dr. Ted Hoffman, Bettye Ackerman as Maggie Graham, Nick Dennis as Nick, Jeanne Bates as Miss Wills. Bethel Leslie as Dr. Jean Howard. Anne Seymour as Mrs. Nancy Farrell, Harry Holcombe as Dr. Prentiss, Anne Whitfield as Sue Paulson, Alex Viespi as Frank Paulson. Nita Loveless, Carolyn Fleming, George Mather, Carmen Nisbet. and Nellie Burt as Una O'Banion. [Revised opening credits highlight both Vincent Edwards and Sam Jaffe] Dr. Casey clashes with a pediatrician while an elderly patient shows courage by facing her suffering gallantly.
9	9	"My Good Friend Krikor"	Irvin Kershner	Theodore Apstein	November 27, 1961
starring Vincent Edwards as Dr. Ben Casey, Sam Jaffe as Dr. David Zorba. Harry Landers as Dr. Ted Hoffman, Bettye Ackerman as Maggie Graham, Nick Dennis as Nick, Jeanne Bates as Miss Wills. Abraham Sofaer as Krikor Dakopian, Arline Sax as Nina Vartan, Roger DeKoven as Joe Dakopian, Henry Corden as Henry Vartan, Jack Hogan as Carl Pierce. Simon Scott, Rex Holman, Paul Keast, Paul Barselow, Paul Pepper and Robert Ellenstein as Dr. Grayson. Uncredited: Spec O'Donnell [patient] After an orderly's friend is committed for psychiatric observation, Dr. Casey goes to court in an attempt to treat him through neurosurgery.
10	10	"The Sweet Kiss of Madness"	Robert Ellis Miller	Theodore Apstein	December 4, 1961
starring Vincent Edwards as Dr. Ben Casey. Harry Landers as Dr. Ted Hoffman, Jeanne Bates as Miss Wills. Starring Arthur Hill as Dr. Alan Reynolds. Guest Star Patricia Barry as Ruth Reynolds. John Lasell as Jack Maxwell, Joyce Van Patten as Stella Maxwell and William Windom as Dr. Owen. Roger Mobley as George Maxwell, Alice Backes as Mrs. Torrance, Brad Trumbull as Sgt. Harris, Mary Gregory as Miss Carson. Robert Hastings, Deirdre Owen, Karen Norris, George Sawaya. A doctor's ambitious wife goads him into suppressing information that would harm his career.
11	11	"A Certain Time, a Certain Darkness"	Abner Biberman	Gilbert Ralston	December 11, 1961
starring Vincent Edwards as Dr. Ben Casey. Sam Jaffe as Dr. David Zorba. Harry Landers as Dr. Ted Hoffman, Jeanne Bates as Miss Wills. Guest Star Joan Hackett as Ellen Parker. Ron Hagerthy as Lawrence Powers. Donald Woods as Frank Dixon. Ray Daley as George Parker, Dyan Cannon as Donna Whitney, Don Spruance as Dr. Robert Ward. Anna-Lisa as Dr. Amy Peterson, Mary Gregory as Miss Carson. Katherine Victor as Technician and Lynn Bari as Ethel Dixon. Dr. Casey confronts a disinterested intern and helps a patient who is ashamed of her epilepsy realize that she can live a productive life.
12	12	"Dark Night for Billy Harris"	Alex March	Gabrielle Upton and William Bast	December 18, 1961
starring Vincent Edwards as Dr. Ben Casey. Sam Jaffe as Dr. David Zorba. Harry Landers as Dr. Ted Hoffman, Jeanne Bates as Miss Wills. Guest Star Telly Savalas as George Dempsey. Elen Willard as Lorie Harris, Bruce Dern as Billy Harris, Ce Ce Whitney as Flo Dempsey, Don Spruance as Dr. Robert Ward. Paul Bryar, Herbert Patterson, Barry Brooks, Louise Lewis. Dr. Casey suspects that bullet-ridden Billy Harris is the victim of a trigger-happy policeman.
13	13	"And If I Die"	Byron Paul	Ken Kolb and James E. Moser	January 1, 1962
starring Vincent Edwards as Dr. Ben Casey. Sam Jaffe as Dr. David Zorba. Harry Landers as Dr. Ted Hoffman, Bettye Ackerman as Maggie Graham, Jeanne Bates as Miss Wills. John Larch as Walter Thurman, Brett Somers as Barbara Thurman. Leo Penn as Dr. Ralph Ferris, Sandra White as Norma Ferris, Karl Swenson as Dr. Frank Barthold, Kay Stewart as Nurse Andrews. June Ellis, Louise Lewis, Carolyn Fleming and Ann Robinson as Sally Hodges. An expectant mother faces brain surgery which could cause the loss of her baby.
14	14	"A Memory of Candy Stripes"	Robert Ellis Miller	Theodore Apstein	January 8, 1962
starring Vincent Edwards as Dr. Ben Casey. Sam Jaffe as Dr. David Zorba. Harry Landers as Dr. Ted Hoffman, Bettye Ackerman as Dr. Maggie Graham, Jeanne Bates as Miss Wills. Guest Star Franchot Tone as Robert Ashton. Denise Alexander as Ann Mullen. Brian Davies as Joe Conklin, Tony Call as Neil Bates, Nick Dennis as Nick Kanavaras, Don Spruance as Dr. Robert Ward. Cyril Delavanti, Dorothy Neumann, Ed Prentiss, Edmund Williams. Dr. Casey jeopardizes his hospital career when he seeks the rehabilitation of an alcoholic patient.
15	15	"Imagine a Long Bright Corridor"	Arthur Hiller	Jack Laird	January 15, 1962
starring Vincent Edwards as Dr. Ben Casey. Bettye Ackerman as Dr. Maggie Graham. Guest Star Cecil Kellaway as Noah Miggs. Betty Garde as Florabelle Hanks, Vivi Janiss as Mrs. Phelps, Strother Martin as Adam Raemecker. Valentín De Vargas as Dr. Escobar, Brenda Scott as Pearl Oglesby, Marge Redmond as Mae Oglesby, Peggie Adams as Miss Van Buren, Lew Brown as Angie. James Nusser, Arthur Malet, Davis Roberts, Jerry Summers, Mike Donovan, Jess Wayne. Penny Santon, Lillian Adams, Paul Wexler and Robert Blake as Jesse Verdugo. Dr. Casey encounters the seamiest side of hospital life during his temporary assignment in the Main Admittance Room.
16	16	"A Story to Be Softly Told"	Alex March	Theodore Apstein	January 22, 1962
starring Vincent Edwards as Dr. Ben Casey. Harry Landers as Dr. Ted Hoffman, Bettye Ackerman as Dr. Maggie Graham, Jeanne Bates as Miss Wills. Guest Star Lee Marvin as Dr. Gerald Bramson. Also Starring Jean Hagen as Lee Bramson. Marianne Stewart as Miss Masterson, Tony Maxwell as Andy Bramson, Shari Lee Bernath as Gloria Bramson, Tracey Stratford as Jenny Bramson, Cecil Weston as Mrs. Watkins. Burt Mustin, Jan Harrison, Ila Briton, Elizabeth Thompson, Carol Andreson. A mother hopes that an operation on her intellectually disabled son will restore him to normalcy and save her marriage.
17	17	"The Big Trouble With Charlie"	Sydney Pollack	Norman Katkov	January 29, 1962
Guest stars: Kevin Brodie, Walter Burke, Norma Crane, Myron McCormick, Harry Raven, Alan Roberts, Alice Rodriguez, Irene Tedrow, Garry Walberg, Jack Warden Dr. Casey discovers a doctor treating derelicts in the back section of a pool room and demands that the patients come to the hospital for proper treatment.
18	18	"Give My Hands an Epitaph"	Alex March	Theodore Apstein	February 5, 1962
Guest stars: Robert Boon, Constance Dane, Jack Klugman, Ruthie Robinson, Eileen Ryan Dr. Casey detects signs of Parkinson's disease in a brain surgeon about to operate.
19	19	"Victory Wears a Cruel Smile"	Abner Biberman	Harry Julian Fink	February 12, 1962
Guest stars: Edward Andrews, Ed Begley, Ruth Foster, Louise Lorimer, Freeman Lusk, Tyler McVey, Nancy Rennick, Alfred Ryder, Don Spruance Dr. Casey brands a staff physician incompetent after he makes an incorrect diagnosis and prescription for a young patient who Casey believes is suffering from myasthenia gravis.
20	20	"Odyssey of a Proud Suitcase"	Leo Penn	Gilbert Ralston	February 19, 1962
Guest stars: Ruth Foster, Francis Lederer, Alice Rodriguez, Stefan Schnabel, Quintin Sondergaard, Fay Spain, Don Spruance, Joseph Vitale A refugee doctor meets resistance from Dr. Casey in his diagnosis for the hospital's prison-ward patient.
21	21	"Behold a Pale Horse"	Abner Biberman	Story by : Teddi Sherman & Judith Plowden; Teleplay by : Jack Laird	February 26, 1962
Guest stars: Keenan Wynn, J. Edward McKinley, Peggie Adams, Lou Krugman, Adam Stewart, Terry Loomis, John Close, John Hart, Paul Hartman: Dr. Casey is drawn into a ruthless battle between a domineering father (Wynn) and his lovelorn daughter (Pleshette).; Also Starring: Suzanne Pleshette as Carolyn Stanley
22	22	"For the Ladybug, One Dozen Roses"	Sydney Pollack	Jack Curtis	March 5, 1962
Guest stars: Michael Davis, Jess Kirkpatrick, Peggy Leon, Lawrence Parke, Cliff Robertson, Charles Wagenheim Superstitions draw together a former Army ace and a terrified Native American boy.
23	23	"To a Grand and Natural Finale"	Abner Biberman	Alvin Sargent and Gabrielle Upton	March 12, 1962
Guest stars: Gina Gillespie, Mary Gregory, Kim Hamilton, Ralph Manza, Phillip Pine, Hari Rhodes, Edgar Stehli, John Zaccaro After collapsing following his last bout, an injured boxer defies Dr. Casey's decision that he submit to a series of medical tests.
24	24	"Monument to an Aged Hunter"	Sydney Pollack	Story by : Oliver Crawford; Teleplay by : Gilbert Ralston	March 19, 1962
Guest stars: Lane Bradford, Kathie Browne, Alan Caillou, Ruth Foster, Wilfrid Hyde-White, Sydney Pollack, Chris Robinson, Robert F. Simon, Kay Stewart Dr. Casey faces a crucial decision when two of his patients require a rare drug, which can only be supplied to one of them.
25	25	"All the Clocks Are Ticking"	Abner Biberman	Story by : Margaret Schneider & Paul Schneider; Teleplay by : Theodore Apstein	March 26, 1962
Guest stars: Henry Beckman, Barry Brooks, Rudy Dolan, Dorothy Konrad, Nan Martin, Ann Morrison, Don Spruance A female patient refuses to face the passage of time and deal with the danger of breast cancer when Dr. Casey treats her for a concussion. Meanwhile, Dr. Hoffman faces his own life-and-death battle with tetanus.
26	26	"Among Others, a Girl Named Abilene"	Arthur Hiller	Norman Katkov & Jack Laird	April 2, 1962
Guest stars: Mabel Albertson, William Allyn, Lillian Bronson, Barry Cahill, Jorja Curtright, Daryl Duke, William Fawcett, Everett Glass, Charity Grace, Ronnie Haran, Harold Innocent, Louise Lewis, George Mitchell, Denver Pyle, Charles Thompson, Paul Tripp Dr. Casey battles ignorance, fear, superstition and demoralization for a series of indigent patients during outside medical relief.
27	27	"A Pleasant Thing for the Eyes"	Arthur Hiller	Jack Curtis	April 16, 1962
Guest stars: Eddie Firestone, Charles Lampkin, Butch Patrick, Alex Sharp, Pearl Shear, Paul Sorensen, Yoko Tani A survivor of both the Hiroshima blast and a school fire has a psychological problem that Dr. Casey admits he can't solve.
28	28	"And Eve Wore a Veil of Tears"	Fielder Cook	Story by : Eric Peters; Teleplay by : James E. Moser & Eric Peters	April 23, 1962
Guest stars: Luana Anders, Betty Field, Carmen Mathews A supervising nurse and an embittered career woman patient who is undergoing menopause test the skills of both Dr. Casey and Dr. Zorba.
29	29	"Preferably, the Less-Used Arm"	Fielder Cook	Gilbert Ralston	April 30, 1962
Guest stars: John Astin, Charles Bateman, Russ Thorson, Chal Johnson, Joe Perry, Ralph Moody, Tom Peters, Tol Avery, Warren Kemmerling, Lee Krieger, Lon Dean, Sandra Stone, Sheldon Allman, Raymond Guth, James Healy: Dr. Casey performs an emergency operation to counter a threatening smallpox epidemic.; Co-starring Ellen McRae as Dr. Leslie Fraser
30	30	"An Uncommonly Innocent Killing"	Alex March	Story by : Les Pine; Teleplay by : Don Brinkley	May 7, 1962
Guest stars: Philip Abbott, Eddie Albert, Ruth Foster, Edmund Glover, Virginia Gregg, Duane Grey, Charles Horvath, Joe Maross, Conrad Nagel, Andrew Prine, Ray Smith A business magnate strikes an associate during a seizure, causing the man's death, and Dr. Casey refuses to release him for trial.
31	31	"So Oft It Chances in Particular Men"	Alex March	James E. Moser	May 21, 1962
Guest stars: James Franciscus, Carol Rossen Tests fail to determine why the victim of a simple accident has developed mental problems.
32	32	"When You See an Evil Man"	Sydney Pollack	James E. Moser & Gilbert Ralston	May 28, 1962
Guest stars: Bill Erwin, Robert Miller, Jeanette Nolan, Simon Oakland, Tuesday Weld, Tom Simcox A mother attempts to protect her daughter by claiming that her alleged suicide attempt followed the murder of her neurosurgeon husband.

=== Season 2 (1962–63) ===
No. overall	No. in season	Title	Directed by	Written by	Original release date
33	1	"Mrs. McBroom and the Cloud Watcher"	Sydney Pollack	Story by : Harry Brown; Teleplay by : Harry Brown and James E. Moser	October 1, 1962
Guest stars: Paul Comi, Cyril Delevanti, Patty Duke, Lee Krieger, Jack Laird, Joanne Linville, Richard Reeves, Katherine Victor, Meg Wyllie After brain surgery, an orphan experiences a new loneliness, she's blind.
34	2	"The Night That Nothing Happened"	Sydney Pollack	Oliver Crawford	October 8, 1962
Guest stars: Lew Brown, Nick Dennis, Vivi Janiss, Valentin de Vargas, Robert Hastings, George E. Mather, Natalie Norwick, Davis Roberts, Tom Troupe, Moria Turner, Don Spruance, Tracy Stratford, Frank Warren, Mrs Tarlow is about to give birth. On the drive to the hospital, she, her husband and her daughter are involved in an auto accident.; Co-starring: Michael Constantine as Engineer Andersen, Jerry Paris as Mr. Tarlow, Jack Elam as Felix Gault
35	3	"In the Name of Love, A Small Corruption"	Stuart Rosenberg	Gilbert Ralston	October 15, 1962
Guest stars: Tol Avery, Nick Dennis, Felicia Farr, John Francis, Patricia Huston, Ellen McRae, Bing Russell, Don Spruance, Rod Steiger, A wealthy man portends to be a modern-day King Lear, as he tries to decide which of his three estranged daughters will get his riches.
36	4	"Legacy from a Stranger"	Joseph Pevney	Story by : Raphael Hayes; Teleplay by : Jack Laird & Raphael Hayes	October 22, 1962
Guest stars: Nick Dennis, David Fresco, Bernard Kates, Jack Kosslyn, Steven Hill, Judson Laire, Janet Margolin, Stafford Repp, Rudy Solari, Helen Westcott A condemned convict and an embittered blind woman are about to have their lives cross as each heads into an uncertain future.
37	5	"Go Not Gently Into the Night"	Sydney Pollack	Arthur L. Murphy	October 29, 1962
Guest stars: Anne Barton, Kevin Brodie, Russell Johnson, Noah Keen, John McLiam, John Newton, Pat Rosson, Don Spruance, Ben Wright Parents who refuse to allow any surgery on their son provoke the wrath of Casey.
38	6	"Behold! They Walk an Ancient Road"	Stuart Rosenberg	Gilbert Ralston	November 5, 1962
Guest stars: Burt Brinckerhoff, Suzi Carnell, Nick Dennis, Ludwig Donath, Carroll O'Connor, Jack Sahakian Casey tries to revive racing driver Lou Carson's will to live after he's diagnosed with a circulatory disease that for the most part is incurable.
39	7	"Of All Save Pain Bereft"	Joseph Pevney	Story by : Peggy Shaw & Lou Shaw; Teleplay by : Jack Laird	November 12, 1962
Guest stars: William Bryant, Ruth Foster, Joan Huntington, Ray Kellogg, Kathleen Maguire, Gerald O'Loughlin, Leo Penn, Paula Petris, Herbert Rudley, Chet Stratton A man with amnesia attempts to put his past back together leading up to surgery that could restore his memory totally .. or not.
40	8	"And Even Death Shall Die"	Leo Penn	Frances Young	November 19, 1962
Guest stars: Elizabeth Ashley, Roy Barcroft, Leora Dana, Crahan Denton, Robert Walker Jr., A promising young architect who is about to marry the girl of his dreams is suddenly diagnosed with a brain tumor, ending the marriage plans after her father finds out about the illness.
41	9	"The Firemen Who Raised Rabbits"	Irving Lerner	Gilbert Ralston	November 26, 1962
Guest stars: Tige Andrews, Walter Burke, Sidney Clute, Nick Dennis, Strother Martin, Rosemary Murphy, L. Q. Jones, Greg Morris, Leo Penn, Hugh Sanders A slow middle-aged man nicknamed Rabbits resides at a local fire station where he is cared for by the firemen. After a bike accident hospitalizes Rabbits, his sister threatens to institutionalize him.
42	10	"Between Summer and Winter, the Glorious Season"	Paul Nickell	Story by : Jack Curtis; Teleplay by : Jack Curtis & Jack Laird	December 3, 1962
Guest stars: Gail Bonney, Nellie Burt, Michael Hinn, Richard Jordan, Dal McKennon, Don Spruance "Plumduff" Lewis, an elderly nurse known for her kindness, and uselessness, gets recruited by Casey when his holiday accident load becomes more than he can handle.
43	11	"I Hear America Singing"	Irving Lerner	Jack Curtis	December 10, 1962
Guest stars: Nick Dennis, Stephen Coit, Jean Holcomb, Barbara Turner, Jack Warden A drunk salesman tries to talk a disabled woman out of filing a lawsuit against him after he runs over her with his car.
44	12	"Pack Up All My Care and Woe"	David Lowell Rich	Wilton Schiller	December 17, 1962
Guest stars: Edward Andrews, Russ Bender, Lillian Buyeff, Ruth Foster, Stacy Harris, John Lawrence, Burgess Meredith, Leo Penn, Barney Phillips, Alice Rodriguez, Paul Sorensen, Marianne Stewart Casey finds himself in the middle of a legal wrangle when a lawyer pressures him to testify in court that brain surgery on Lester Partridge will do away with the convict's murderous tendencies.
45	13	"Saturday, Surgery and Stanley Schultz"	Irving Lerner	Alvin Sargent	December 31, 1962
Guest stars: Jan Bradley, Barry Brooks, Jon Cedar, James Dunn, Bern Hoffman, Hope Holiday, John Lodge, Jean MacRae, Robert Miller, Eli Mintz, Frances Osborne, John Pavelko, Alice Rodriguez, Sydney Smith, Moria Turner Casey wonders why hospital clown Stanley Schultz, who has performed for patients for eight years, refuses to entertain the patients in neurosurgery.
46	14	"I'll Be All Right in the Morning"	Sydney Pollack	Story by : Theodore Apstein & Wilton Schiller; Teleplay by : Wilton Schiller	January 7, 1963
Guest stars: Charlene Brooks, Steven Hill, Bethel Leslie, Ernest A. Losso (credited as Ernest Losso) When a surgeon discovers he has a disorder that causes him to lose his balance, he determines to continue in his career.
47	15	"A Cardinal Act of Mercy Part 1"	Sydney Pollack	Norman Katkov	January 14, 1963
Guest stars: Gary Crosby, Timmy Everett, Glenda Farrell, Miranda Jones, Lillian Powell, Napoleon Simpson, Kim Stanley Casey tries to help a lawyer kick her drug habit, but encounters resistance, lies and manipulation when she gets a guileless young man to smuggle dope into her hospital room. He is visiting his mother, who is in the hospital for treatment of injuries received in a beating.
48	16	"A Cardinal Act of Mercy Part 2"	Sydney Pollack	Norman Katkov	January 21, 1963
Guest stars: Gary Crosby, Timmy Everett, Glenda Farrell, Kim Stanley Dr. Casey prescribes morphine for Faith, a drug addict, to make her comfortable while treating her. Casey uncovers Faith's secret: she gets a young man to smuggle in drugs for her after Dr. Zorba orders Casey to stop giving her morphine shots.
49	17	"Use Neon for My Epitaph"	Paul Nickell	Gilbert Ralston	January 28, 1963
Guest stars: Sallie Brophy, Curt Conway, Will Kuluva, Paul Martin, Gary Merrill, Bryan O'Byrne, Alice Rodriguez, Don Spruance, Evelyn Ward Movie star Miles Houghton collapses during the filming of a multimillion-dollar production and Casey's diagnosis is if Houghton returns to work, he will die.
50	18	"He Thought He Saw an Albatross"	Leo Penn	Don Brinkley	February 4, 1963
Guest stars: Dianne Foster, Mary Gregory, Bernie Hamilton, Kim Hamilton, Leslie Nielsen, Leo Penn A psychiatrist claims that he can cure Casey's patient without the aid of neurosurgery.
51	19	"A Short Biographical Sketch of James Tuttle Peabody MD"	Paul Nickell	Norman Katkov	February 11, 1963
Guest stars: Claudia Bryar, Gage Clarke, Lisabeth Hush, Maurice Jara, Karl Lukas, Erin O'Donnell, Joseph Sweeney, Justin Smith, Fred Vincent Although he's still an intern, Jimmy Peabody is raising funds to finance a medical clinic of his own, and one of the sources he's depending on is wealthy Adam Garrett, an elderly patient at County General.
52	20	"A Hundred More Pipers"	Leo Penn	Barry Oringer	February 18, 1963
Guest stars: Marcus Demian, James Donald, Ruth Foster, Mary LaRoche, Walter Mathews, Paula Petris, Harold J. Stone, Edmund Williams Dr. Casey admires surgeon Alvin MacKenzie, but he can't understand why his colleague has erected such a cold barrier between himself and his patients.
53	21	"Suffer the Little Children"	Sydney Pollack	James E. Moser,	February 25, 1963
Guest stars: Elizabeth Allen, Paul Comi, James Griffith, Leslye Hunter, Jacqueline Scott, Edward C. Short, Russell Thorson, Moria Turner, Cece Whitney (credited as CeCe Whitney) After an infant dies of head injuries, Casey learns that her sister was also hurt at about the same time - and he begins to doubt that the children were really accident victims.
54	22	"Rigadoon for Three Pianos"	Leo Penn	Gilbert Ralston	March 4, 1963
Guest stars: Virginia Christine, Diana Hyland, Stephen Joyce, Alfred Ryder, Beatrice Straight Greta Bauer's mother is dominating not only her career as a pianist, but her personal life as well - and her aunt Alice refuses to undergo crucial surgery unless she is assured that Greta will have her freedom.
55	23	"The White Ones Are Dolphins"	Alex March	James J. Sweeney	March 11, 1963
Guest stars: Luther Adler, Nick Dennis, Sharon Farrell, John Qualen: An eccentric is picketing County General which proves embarrassing for his student-nurse daughter and exasperating for Casey.; Special guest star Ray Walston as Councilman York
56	24	"Will Everyone Who Believes in Terry Dunne Please Applaud"	Alex March	Story by : Wilton Schiller & Leo Penn; Teleplay by : Wilton Schiller	March 18, 1963
Guest stars: Pete Beathard, Lane Bradford, Neville Brand, Lane Bradford, Nick Dennis, Sally Gracie, Ronnie Knox, Tony Linehan: Casey tangles with an apparently self-destructive 39-year-old football star who refuses to undergo desperately needed surgery.; Also starring: Lee Kinsolving as Terrence Dunne Jr.
57	25	"For I Will Plait Thy Hair with Gold"	Leo Penn	Gilbert Ralston	March 25, 1963
Guest stars: Peter Baldwin, Nick Dennis, Mariette Hartley, Dan O'Herlihy Despite surgery, Julie Carr may go blind – and now her fiancee has left her to face the darkness alone.
58	26	"Father Was an Intern"	Alex March	Norman Katkov	April 1, 1963
Guest stars: Philip Bourneuf, Dabney Coleman, Tony Franke, Theodore Lehmann (credited as Ted Lehmann), Ralph Moody, Michael Parks, Frances Reid, Doris Roberts, James Whitmore Bud Forrest frowns on his financially pressed father's plans to complete his long-delayed internship.
59	27	"Rage Against the Dying Light"	Irving Lerner	Arthur L. Murphy	April 15, 1963
Guest stars: Melvyn Douglas, Frederick Beir, Lonny Chapman Architect Burton Strang's lifelong ambition to design a new type of cathedral is thwarted by a strange partial paralysis, which Casey believes to be surgically curable. But a colleague, Dr Freel, disagrees.
60	28	"La Vie, La Vie Interieure"	Leo Penn	Gilbert Ralston	April 22, 1963
Guest stars: Gloria Calomee, Guy De Vestel, Olive Deering, Michael Forest, Paul Mantee, John Pickard, Peggy Rea. Dick Wilson A singer refuses to let an inoperable brain tumor prevent her from fulfilling a concert commitment.
61	29	"My Enemy Is a Bright Green Sparrow"	Robert Butler	Barry Oringer	April 29, 1963
Guest stars: Arthur Batanides, Marcel Dalio, John Larch, Patricia Neal, Richard Reeves, Charles Wagenheim Jan Shutan, Charles Wagenheim Staff psychiatrist Louise Chapelle has skid row patient Robert Anderson transferred to her care – but his revelations under narcosynthesis disturb her profoundly.
62	30	"Lullaby for Billy Dignan"	Leo Penn	Story by : Jerry Davis; Teleplay by : Gilbert Ralston	May 6, 1963
Guest stars: Philip Abbott, Barbara Barrie, Don Hanmer, Ruth Phillips An adopted child requires a series of major operations.
63	31	"Hang No Hats on Dreams"	Irving Lerner	Howard Dimsdale (credited as Arthur Dales)	May 13, 1963
Guest stars: Ed Begley, Doreen Lang, Jon Lormer, Kathy Nolan, Willard Sage Casey runs head-on into the problem of medical quackery when one of his colleagues seeks treatment from a charlatan.

=== Season 3 (1963–64) ===
No. overall	No. in season	Title	Directed by	Written by	Original release date
64	1	"For This Relief, Much Thanks"	Sydney Pollack	Steven Carabatsos & John T. Dugan	September 9, 1963
Guest stars: Scott Marlowe, Millie Perkins, Oscar Homolka, Paul Richards, Eduard Franz A musician is disturbed by the conflict between himself and his cruelly authoritarian father. The events of this episode continued in the first episode of Breaking Point the following week.
65	2	"Justice to a Microbe"	Leo Penn	Jack Raphael Guss	September 18, 1963
Guest stars: Robert Loggia, James Caan, Paul Comi The entire hospital staff is put on emergency service to treat a patient who has a radioactive substance in his spine. Dr. Maggie Graham switches her specialty from Anesthesiology to Neurology.
66	3	"With the Rich and Mighty, Always a Little Patience"	Paul Wendkos	Norman Katkov	September 25, 1963
Guest stars: Anne Francis, Frank Aletter, Frederick Beir A spoiled young socialite is used to getting what she wants and now she wants Dr. Casey.
67	4	"Allie"	Leo Penn	Barry Oringer	October 2, 1963
Guest stars: Sammy Davis Jr., Greg Morris A baseball star loses an eye during an accident on the field, then clashes with an African-American doctor who thinks the baseball player has no future.
68	5	"If There Were Dreams to Sell"	Mark Rydell	Gabrielle Upton	October 9, 1963
Guest stars: Suzy Somers, Cecil Kellaway, Kay Medford 11-year-old Collie Smith sees Dr. Casey as a father figure, given a family life that includes the absence of her real father, her dying grandfather and her apathetic mother.
69	6	"The Echo of a Silent Cheer (Part 1)"	Leo Penn	William P. McGivern	October 16, 1963
Guest stars: Barry Sullivan, Beau Bridges The body-building campaign set up by David Masterson, the father of an athlete, conflicts with Dr. Casey's insistence that the boy needs an operation.
70	7	"The Echo of a Silent Cheer (Part 2)"	Leo Penn	William P. McGivern	October 23, 1963
Guest stars: Barry Sullivan, Beau Bridges, Edward Asner David Masterson sues County General for $1 million, claiming that an unauthorized operation on his son by Dr. Casey has left him totally and permanently paralyzed.
71	8	"Little Drops of Water, Little Grains of Sand"	Richard C. Sarafian	Les Pine	October 30, 1963
Guest stars: Aldo Ray, Norma Crane Though a factory worker is brought to County general with an apparent brain tumor, Dr. Casey suspects lead poisoning and begins an investigation of the factory.
72	9	"Light Up the Dark Corners"	Mark Rydell	Jeanne Beeching	November 6, 1963
Guest stars: Richard Basehart, Piper Laurie, J. Pat O'Malley An Irish sea captain's terminal disease brings him to County General, where he meets a feisty Irish nurse who eventually falls in love with him.
73	10	"Six Impossible Things Before Breakfast"	Irving Lerner	Don Brinkley	November 13, 1963
Guest stars: Ricardo Montalbán, Logan Ramsey Patient Henry Davis abuses women, which he confesses to Dr. Graham, who is bound by doctor-patient privilege not to reveal the information.
74	11	"Fire in a Sacred Fruit Tree"	Robert Butler	Anthony Lawrence	November 20, 1963
Guest stars: Dean Jones, Ulla Jacobsson Medical ethics come into play when debate over whether the unborn child of a refugee mother should be aborted due to health concerns.
75	12	"Dispel the Black Cyclone That Shakes the Throne"	Vince Edwards (credited as Vincent Edwards)	Story by : Alvin Sargent; Teleplay by : Jack Laird	November 27, 1963
Guest stars: Mary Astor, Eileen Heckart, James Dunn, Luana Anders An aging operatic diva is going blind, with her devoted secretary standing by her side.
76	13	"My Love, My Love"	Richard C. Sarafian	Story by : Eugene Solow; Teleplay by : William Wood	December 4, 1963
Guest stars: Barry Nelson, Anna-Lisa, Anjanette Comer Married pathologist Joe Garry develops multiple sclerosis, and begins running County General's ward that deals with people who have the disease. While there, he becomes attracted to one of the female patients.
77	14	"From Too Much Love of Living"	Mark Rydell	Norman Jacob	December 11, 1963
Guest stars: Barbara Rush, Peter Mark Richman Dr. Casey treats a woman who tried to commit suicide because her husband's medical career at County General is causing him to neglect her, which causes Dr. Casey to counsel the couple.
78	15	"It Is Getting Dark… And We Are Lost"	Leo Penn	Story by : Barry Trivers; Teleplay by : Jack Laird & Teddi Sherman	December 18, 1963
Guest stars: Ann Jillian, Robert Webber, Gene Lyons Dr. Casey desperately attempts to locate the father of a precocious girl who is found mumbling in Latin and German after having been injured in an accident.
79	16	"The Last Splintered Spoke of the Old Burlesque Wheel"	Robert Butler	Story by : Al C. Ward; Teleplay by : Charles K. Peck Jr.	December 25, 1963
Guest stars: Maggie McNamara, George Grizzard Dr. Casey attempts to restore a stripper's self-worth, after she was heavily influenced by a hypocritical evangelist.
80	17	"The Light That Loses, The Night That Wins"	Irving Lerner	Oliver Crawford	January 1, 1964
Guest stars: Dana Andrews, Peggy McCay A once-great surgeon loses his nerve after one of his patients dies under his care, and Dr. Casey attempts to motivate him into performing another operation.
81	18	"I'll Get on My Ice Floe and Wave Goodbye"	Mark Rydell	Fred Freiberger	January 8, 1964
Guest stars: Charles Ruggles, Suzanne Cupito, Rachel Ames A stubborn old man is hospitalized due to a stroke and refuses to tell any of the hospital staff his name, so that he's not a burden to his family. He attempts to leave in order to attend his granddaughter's dancing debut.
82	19	"The Only Place Where They Know My Name"	Irving Lerner	Lionel E. Siegel	January 15, 1964
Guest stars: Phil Harris, Michael Higgins An ethics debate erupts when a homeless man offers to have his eye removed for a fee so that a research biologist can conduct an experiment.
83	20	"There Was Once a Man in the Land of Uz"	Charles R. Rondeau	Anthony Lawrence	January 22, 1964
Guest stars: Robert Walker Jr., Royal Dano Larry Franklin is a man with a gift for religious visions, but his gift could disappear if Dr. Casey removes a blood clot from his brain.
84	21	"One Nation Indivisible"	Leo Penn	Story by : Marcus Demian; Teleplay by : Norman Katkov	January 29, 1964
Guest stars: Susan Gordon, Michael Conrad, Ned Glass On the Fourth of July, a young girl with a rare blood type sustains head injuries from an auto accident. However, she can't undergo life-saving surgery until the blood is obtained, resulting in Dr. Casey's mobilizing communication for a nationwide request.
85	22	"Goodbye to Blue Elephants and Such"	Leo Penn	Story by : Jeanne Beeching; Teleplay by : Dean Riesner	February 5, 1964
Guest stars: Davey Davison, Virginia Christine, James T. Callahan After a student nurse is attacked in a park near the hospital, she fakes amnesia in order to avoid having to reveal to her fiance what she was doing in the park.
86	23	"The Bark of a Three-Headed Hound"	Harmon Jones	Meyer Dolinsky	February 12, 1964
Guest stars: Bradford Dillman, Jeffrey Morris, Sally Kellerman Two men are confined to the same hospital room, respectively with severe lung trouble and facing brain surgery. They're both in love with the latter's wife and make a fateful bet that the surviving patient will get the other's life insurance money.
87	24	"The Sound of One Hand Clapping"	Leo Penn	Michael Zagor	February 19, 1964
Guest stars: Robert Culp, Milton Selzer, Richard Evans, Pilar Seurat A veteran of the Korean War refuses anethesia when a bullet needs to be removed from his leg.
88	25	"A Falcon's Eye, a Lion's Heart, a Girl's Hand"	Mark Rydell	Barry Oringer	February 26, 1964
Guest stars: Harry Guardino, Robert F. Simon, Abraham Sofaer Knowing that a former neurosurgeon's license to practice medicine has been revoked, a desperate Dr. Casey asks him to perform surgery in the midst of an emergency, resulting in Dr. Casey's being summoned before County Hospital's Board of Inquiry.
89	26	"The Lonely Ones"	Leo Penn	Richard Landau	March 4, 1964
Guest stars: Jill Ireland, Betsy Jones-Moreland An alcoholic schoolteacher is hit by a playground glider, and when she's treated at the hospital, Dr. Casey seeks to discover the reason for her drinking.
90	27	"Keep Out of Reach of Adults"	Harmon Jones	William P. McGivern	March 11, 1964
Guest stars: Richard Kiley, Geraldine Brooks The operator of a health clinic who peddles phony cures attempts to convince his wife that his treatments will work on her, despite an official diagnosis by Dr. Casey of a brain tumor.
91	28	"Dress My Doll Pretty"	Mark Rydell	Story by : Paul Mason; Teleplay by : Gabrielle Upton	March 18, 1964
Guest stars: Betsy Hale, Sheree North, Mike Kellin A lonely 10-year-old girl who's been hospitalized with a head injury, prefers the help of a junk dealer instead of her irresponsible mother.
92	29	"Onions and Mustard Seed Will Make Her Weep"	Charles R. Rondeau	Les Pine	March 25, 1964
Guest stars: Noreen Corcoran, Virginia Eiler A guilt-ridden Dr. Casey, who was unable to save the life of a man due to inconclusive tests, must deal with his confused widow's appeal for comfort and sympathy and her inability to cope with motherhood.
93	30	"Make Me the First American"	Mark Rydell	Anthony Lawrence	April 1, 1964
Guest stars: Frank DeKova, Mario Alcalde, Burt Brinckerhoff A aged and terminally ill Native American becomes a symbol of courage to a youth who's fearing his pending surgery.
94	31	"Heap Logs and Let the Blaze Laugh Out"	Irving Lerner	Chester Krumholz	April 8, 1964
Guest stars: Irene Dailey, Charles Robinson, Gail Kobe A career woman puts Dr. Casey in a difficult position when she chooses to leave the assets of her firm to County General in her will.
95	32	"For a Just Man Falleth Seven Times"	Vince Edwards (credited as Vincent Edwards)	Story by : Gilbert Ralston and Harry Rellis; Teleplay by : Gilbert Ralston	April 15, 1964
Guest stars: Lew Ayres, Lee Grant, Sharon Farrell Businessman Thomas Hardin seeks to get more enjoyment out of life, but his time left to live is diminishing rapidly.
96	33	"The Evidence of Things Not Seen"	Irving Lerner	John Meredyth Lucas	April 22, 1964
Guest stars: Wilfrid Hyde-White, Katharine Ross, Joby Baker, Carl Benton Reid A Catholic missionary priest seeks to heal the breach between the father of another patient and her atheist husband.

=== Season 4 (1964–65) ===
No. overall	No. in season	Title	Directed by	Written by	Original release date
97	1	"August is the Month Before Christmas"	Allen Reisner	John Kneubuhl	September 14, 1964
Guest stars: Margaret Leighton, Jessica Walter, Gerald Michenaud, Ted Bessell, Stella Stevens A young boy brought to County General with a head injury is found to have a hereditary disorder (Gaucher disease) that his mother is evasive about. Dr. Casey also plans to operate on Jane Hancock, a woman who has been in a come for 15 years.
98	2	"A Bird in the Solitude Singing"	John Meredyth Lucas	John Meredyth Lucas	September 21, 1964
Guest stars: Anne Francis, Buck Taylor, Stella Stevens A brilliant, but embittered alcoholic who needs risky plastic surgery to restore her disfigured face, develops a relationship with a paralyzed patient.
99	3	"But Who Shall Beat the Drums?"	Leo Penn	Norman Jacob	September 28, 1964
Guest stars: Rip Torn, Susan Bay, Stella Stevens, John Anderson A literature student working on his doctorate is in need of brain surgery before he takes his oral exams.
100	4	"Autumn Without Red Leaves"	Mark Rydell	Story by : Lou Shaw; Teleplay by : Norman Katkov & Chester Krumholz	October 5, 1964
Guest stars: Robert Culp, Collin Wilcox, Stella Stevens An artist with dreams of a great future is left color blind by a stroke. Meanwhile, Dr. Casey takes his formerly comatose patient Jane Hancock out to dinner.
101	5	"You Fish or You Cut Bait"	Allen Reisner	Norman Katkov	October 12, 1964
Guest stars: Stella Stevens, John Anderson, William Demarest The wealthy father of Jane Hancock makes Dr. Casey a lucrative offer if he'll marry her.
102	6	"For Jimmy, the Best of Everything"	Mark Rydell	Barry Oringer	October 19, 1964
Guest stars: Peter Falk, Lee Grant, Malachi Throne An ambitious doctor neglects his ailing fiance while the threat of the bubonic plague epidemic exists.
103	7	"A Woods Full of Question Marks"	Marc Daniels	Ellis Marcus	October 26, 1964
Guest stars: Dane Clark, June Reed, Nancy Rennick, Meg Wyllie Emergency surgery is performed by Dr. Casey on Kathy Huntsinger, a "profoundly deaf" girl whose father wants to send her to a school for mentally disabled children.
104	8	"A Thousand Words Are Mute"	John Meredyth Lucas	Allan Scott	November 9, 1964
Guest stars: Pippa Scott, Robert Sampson, Elisabeth Fraser A young English professor has a stroke just prior to getting married, and Dr. Casey refuses to baby her in order to speed her recovery.
105	9	"Money, a Horse and a Knowledge of Latin"	Charles R. Rondeau	Oliver Crawford	November 16, 1964
Guest stars: Barry Sullivan, Angela Greene, Walter Brooke After a man is injured in a fall, Dr. Casey requests immediate surgery. However, the man's wife insists that Dr. Arnold Swanson, a noted author of medical books, perform the operation, even though his writing is better than his surgical technique.
106	10	"A Disease of the Heart Called Love"	Mark Rydell	Pat Fielder	November 23, 1964
Guest stars: Shelley Winters, Milt Kamen Lydia Mitchum, an unwed nurse puts her life and the life of her unborn child at risk when she insists on bearing the child despite having a disease.
107	11	"Kill the Dream, but Spare the Dreamer"	Allen Reisner	Lionel E. Siegel	November 30, 1964
Guest stars: Darren McGavin, Peggy McCay, Allan Melvin Working temporarily at a veterans' hospital, Dr. Casey clashes with the head of neurosurgery who seems more interested in boosting the morale of patients than performing surgery.
108	12	"Courage at 3 A.M."	John Erman	Alfred Brenner	December 7, 1964
Guest stars: Janice Rule, Whit Bissell A biochemist pressures Dr. Casey into performing a cancer operation so that she can continue an important research project.
109	13	"The Wild, Wild, Wild Waltzing World"	Paul Wendkos	Jack Curtis	December 14, 1964
Guest stars: Joan Hackett, Robert Loggia A suicidal polio patient is encouraged by the love of a war veteran.
110	14	"A Boy is Standing Outside the Door"	John Meredyth Lucas	Theodore Apstein	January 4, 1965
Guest stars: Maureen O'Sullivan, Tony Bill, Elsa Lanchester A widowed mother of a high school student with cerebral palsy is overprotective in her attempts to shield him from life's frustrations.
111	15	"Where Does the Boomerang Go?"	John Meredyth Lucas	Story by : P.K. Palmer; Teleplay by : Chester Krumholz	January 11, 1965
Guest stars: George Hamilton, Bob Random, Norman Fell, Aneta Corsaut, Irene Tedrow An Australian veterinarian gives Dr. Casey a key clue in a baffling case of a boy's illness when it's determined that it's due to having conducted scientific research in bat caves.
112	16	"Pas de Deux"	Marc Daniels	Dick Nelson	January 18, 1965
Guest stars: Susan Oliver, Harvey Lembeck, Alfred Ryder, Dan Tobin While visiting San Francisco, Dr. Casey ends up giving a visiting Russian ballerina a tour of the city, while her ballet master fears that she's been kidnapped.
113	17	"Every Other Minute, It's the End of the World"	Vince Edwards (credited as Vincent Edwards)	Sam Ross	January 25, 1965
Guest stars: Francis Lederer, Patricia Hyland A diabetic refuses to take her insulin, which could result in permanent blindness, while her father is reluctant to have Dr. Casey perform a risky surgery that has only previously been performed on animals.
114	18	"A Rambling Discourse on Egyptian Water Clocks"	John Meredyth Lucas	Howard Dimsdale (credited as Arthur Dales)	February 1, 1965
Guest stars: Peter Haskell, Barbara Barrie, Walter Koenig Dr. Casey must deal with a brilliant philosophy scholar who has an ailment that the man declares is terminal, much to the chagrin of his wife.
115	19	"When I Am Grown to Man's Estate"	Leo Penn	Michael Zagor	February 8, 1965
Guest stars: Roddy McDowall, Donald Losby, Madeleine Sherwood A precocious boy has self-induced epileptic seizures, which helps a welfare worker who is doing a research paper on the condition.
116	20	"A Man, a Maid, and a Marionette"	Marc Daniels	Story by : Merwin Gerard; Teleplay by : Chester Krumholz	February 22, 1965
Guest stars: Marsha Hunt, Van Johnson, Tim McIntire, Indus Arthur Jerry Dawson is considered a hypochondriac by his father because of coddling of his mother, but his fiancée urges him to make his own health decisions and fix the problems between his parents.
117	21	"A Dipperful of Water from a Poisoned Well"	John Meredyth Lucas	Les Pine	March 1, 1965
Guest stars: Denny Scott Miller, Viveca Lindfors, Hans Conried, Mark Sturges A dock worker with heavy family obligations is hospitalized. This circumstance causes his mother, who he financially supports along with his invalid father and sickly brother, to claim that he's faking his illness.
118	22	"A Little Fun to Match the Sorrow"	Jerry Lewis	Chester Krumholz	March 8, 1965
Guest stars: Jerry Lewis, Dianne Foster, James Best, Tige Andrews The clownish actions of a new neurosurgery resident draw the wrath of Dr. Casey, but they're simply a cover-up for his deep concern for his patients.
119	23	"Minus That Rusty Old Hacksaw"	Leon Benson	Story by : Ellis Marcus & Al C. Ward; Teleplay by : Ellis Marcus	March 15, 1965
Guest stars: Gloria Swanson, Joe De Santis Dr. Ted Hoffman, an associate of Dr. Casey, must contend with his manipulative new stepmother who seeks to control his father's affairs.
120	24	"Eulogy in Four Flats"	Vince Edwards (credited as Vincent Edwards)	Chester Krumholz	March 22, 1965
Guest stars: Lee Tracy, Tom Drake, Norma Connolly, Donna Anderson A combative recluse lives in squalor and has three people continually providing assistance to him. However, he's accused by Dr. Casey of faking his disabled legs in order to maintain that help.
121	25	"Three Li'l Lambs"	Vince Edwards (credited as Vincent Edwards)	Story by : Rod Alexander; Teleplay by : Howard Dimsdale (credited as Arthur Dales) & Rod Alexander	March 29, 1965
Guest stars: Nick Adams, Norman Alden, William Arvin, Marlo Thomas, Kathy Kersh, Joan Young A trio of aspiring neurosurgeons are severely tested by Dr. Casey.
122	26	"A Slave is On the Throne"	Alex March	Story by : Lee Berg; Teleplay by : Chester Krumholz	April 12, 1965
Guest stars: Nancy Berg, Gene Dynarski, Colette Jackson, Jack Klugman, Pippa Scott, Jeanne Justin, K.L. Smith The ability of a skilled surgeon (Klugman) is compromised by his infidelity to his wife (Scott) with a married woman (Berg).
123	27	"Journeys End in Lovers Meeting"	Alan Crosland Jr.	Pat Fielder	April 19, 1965
Guest stars: Red Buttons, Antoinette Bower, Ellen Corby, Julie Parrish, Len Wayland, S. John Launer, Jon Lormer, Kip King, Argentina Brunetti A dedicated schoolteacher (Buttons) is burdened with the strong premonition that his wife (Bower) won't survive brain surgery.
124	28	"The Day They Stole County General"	Marc Daniels	Sheldon Stark	April 26, 1965
Guest stars: Nick Dennis, Howard Da Silva, Sharon Farrell, Cliff Norton, Mary Wickes, Larry Hovis, Lee Krieger, Bert Conroy, Vincent Perry While his niece lies seriously ill in the hospital, a con man (Howard Da Silva) attempts to remove valuable equipment from the hospital in piecemeal fashion.
125	29	"Did Your Mother Come From Ireland, Ben Casey?"	Allen Reisner	D.C. Fontana	May 3, 1965
Guest stars: Tom Bosley, Stephen Coit, Raymond Joyer (credited as Ray Joyer), William Long Jr. (credited as William Long), Billy Mumy, Michael Pataki, Cesar Romero After being stricken with appendicitis, Dr. Casey is placed in a hospital room between an Irishman (Bosley) with a brain tumor who loves to talk and an alcoholic doctor (Romero) who lost his practice and wants to die.
126	30	"From Sutter's Crick...and Beyond Farewell"	Irving Lerner	Jack Curtis	May 10, 1965
Guest stars: Wilfrid Hyde-White, John Megna, Ted Gehring, K.L. Smith A medium who's wanted by the police for fraud strikes up a relationship with a boy who is faking an inability to talk.
127	31	"A Horse Named Stravinsky"	Alan Crosland Jr.	Barry Oringer	May 17, 1965
Guest stars: John Hubbard, Eartha Kitt, Paul Lukather, Mike Murphy, John Qualen, Percy Rodrigues, Carlos Romero, Everett Sloane The wife of a skilled surgeon has a seizure. The husband attributes the problem to her psychiatric care, but Dr. Casey believes she's simply afraid of going insane.

=== Season 5 (1965–66) ===
No. overall	No. in season	Title	Directed by	Written by	Original release date
128	1	"War of Nerves"	Richard C. Sarafian	Alfred Brenner & Howard Dimsdale (credited as Arthur Dales)	September 13, 1965
Guest stars: Antoinette Bower, Richard Devon, Diana Douglas, Shary Marshall, Leslie Nielsen, Malachi Throne Two biological warfare researchers develop puzzling neurological symptoms, including bleeding of the brain, which Dr. Casey believes can be stopped by undergoing a risky, unproven surgery.
129	2	"O' the Big Wheel Turns by Faith, by Faith"	Marc Daniels	Howard Dimsdale (credited as Arthur Dales) & Lionel E. Siegel	September 20, 1965
Guest stars: R.N. Bullard, Allen Calm (credited as Alan Calm), Davey Davison, James Farentino, Shary Marshall, Stephen McNally, Gregory Morton, Malachi Throne After undergoing tests, it's determined that a young woman is faking an attack of polio. Meanwhile, Dr. Casey must deal with a malpractice suit and the resignation of a valuable doctor.
130	3	"A Nightingale Named Nathan"	John Meredyth Lucas	Howard Dimsdale (credited as Arthur Dales) & Chester Krumholz	September 27, 1965
Guest stars: Sidney Clute, Howard Da Silva, Susan Flannery, Allen Jenkins, Don Marshall, Stephen McNally, Gregory Morton, Sam Weston, Barbara Turner, Claire Wilcox After Jewish cantor Nathan Birnbaum (Da Silva) loses his voice, he believes that it's punishment from God for blasphemy, and that he's beyond help.
131	4	"Run for Your Lives, Dr. Galanos Practices Here!"	Vince Edwards (credited as Vincent Edwards)	Howard Dimsdale (credited as Arthur Dales) & Barry Oringer	October 4, 1965
Guest stars: Rico Alaniz, Michael Ansara, Betsy Jones-Moreland, Gregory Morton, Nehemiah Persoff, Robert Phillips, Noam Pitlik, Bob Random, Claire Wilcox A philosophical conflict between an aging Latin American revolutionary (Persoff) and his son (Ansara) finds Dr. Casey stuck in the middle.
132	5	"Because of the Needle, the Haystack Was Lost"	Alan Crosland Jr.	Howard Dimsdale (credited as Arthur Dales) & John Meredyth Lucas	October 11, 1965
Guest stars: Gladys Cooper, Ann Harding, Byron Morrow, Gregory Morton, George Murdock, Walter Reed, Hari Rhodes, Malachi Throne, Claire Wilcox A medical malpractice case that was filed against Dr. Casey is reviewed by the hospital board.
133	6	"What to Her Is Plato?"	Marc Daniels	Howard Dimsdale (credited as Arthur Dales) & Richard H. Landau (credited as Richard Landau)	October 18, 1965
Guest stars: Bernie Kopell, Charles Lampkin, Linda Lawson, Gregory Morton, Noam Pitlik, Julie Sommars, Malachi Throne, Bette Treadville A young woman (Sommars) who has no money or friends finds herself unable to sign different authorization papers, thereby baffling Dr. Casey and his staff.
134	7	"Francini? Who Is Francini?"	Gerald Mayer	Howard Dimsdale (credited as Arthur Dales) & Barry Oringer	October 25, 1965
Guest stars: Lillian Adams, John Bleifer, Gabriel Dell, Richard Dreyfuss, David Fresco, Lee Krieger, Steven Marlo, Edwin Max, David Renard, Pippa Scott, Ward Wood A new orderly is suspected of taking hospital supplies in order to give them to impoverished patients.
135	8	"Then I, and You, and All of Us Fell Down"	Irving Lerner	Story by : Norman Katkov; Teleplay by : Howard Dimsdale (credited as Arthur Dales) & Norman Katkov	November 1, 1965
Guest stars: Brian Bedford, Dick Clark, Charles Irving, Len Lesser, Steven Marlo, Noam Pitlik A highly acclaimed doctor (Clark) who has just returned from working in Africa is hospitalized.
136	9	"No More, Cried the Rooster - There Will Be Truth"	Harvey Hart	Story by : Howard Dimsdale & Jo Pagano; Teleplay by : Howard Dimsdale (credited as Arthur Dales) & Barry Oringer	November 8, 1965
Guest stars: Antoinette Bower, Benson Fong, Anna Hagan, James Hong, Charles Irving, George Murdock, Martin Priest, Walter Reed, James Shigeta, Malachi Throne, Ron Whelan In the midst of the medical malpractice lawsuit against him, Dr. Casey has to pick up one of his interns who was involved in a riot at a coffeehouse.
137	10	"The Importance of Being 65937"	Alan Crosland Jr.	Kevin DeCourcey & Barry Oringer	November 15, 1965
Guest stars: Wolfe Barzell, R.N. Bullard, Macdonald Carey, Ned Glass, Scott Graham, Phil Posner, Linda Gaye Scott, Billy Snyder, Harry Swoger A proud police officer (Carey) who's facing major surgery makes the decision to hide his identity from Dr. Casey.
138	11	"When Givers Prove Unkind"	Gerald Mayer	Howard Dimsdale (credited as Arthur Dales) & Michael Zagor	November 22, 1965
Guest stars: Ned Glass, Jonathan Hole, Wilfrid Hyde-White, Allyn Joslyn, Don Keefer, Linda Marsh, Gregory Morton Alec Bateman (Joslyn), a wealthy tycoon who's hospitalized, decides that Dr. Casey would be the ideal husband for his stubborn daughter Claudia (Marsh). He makes a large donation to the hospital--but the gift is contingent on Dr. Casey working with Claudia to develop an arts and sciences foundation.
139	12	"The Man from Quasilia"	Irving Lerner	Oliver Crawford & Howard Dimsdale (credited as Arthur Dales)	November 29, 1965
Guest stars: Victor French, Ned Glass, Wilfrid Hyde-White, Barbara Luna, Joseph Mell, Nico Minardos, Penny Santon, Nicolas Surovy, Al Waxman A foreign exchange intern is given such a hard time by Dr. Casey that hospital authorities demand that Dr. Casey explain his actions.
140	13	"Why Did the Day Go Backwards?"	Harvey Hart	Howard Dimsdale (credited as Arthur Dales) & Barry Oringer	December 6, 1965
Guest stars: Curt Conway, Jamie Farr, Don Francks, Don Haggerty, Wilfrid Hyde-White, Lainie Kazan, Larry D. Mann, Steven Marlo, Dennis Robertson The acting chief of neurosurgery, Dr. Manning Taylor (Hyde-White), fires Dr. Casey and then has a stroke. This takes place while Dr. Casey is continually frustrated as he tries to get a case history from a badly beaten girl.
141	14	"You Wanna Know What Really Goes on in a Hospital?"	Harry Landers	Chester Krumholz	December 20, 1965
Guest stars: Billy Curtis, Don Francks, Lloyd Gough, Craig Hundley, Robert Karnes, Sally Kellerman, Gregory Morton, Michael Murphy, Burt Mustin, Noam Pitlik, Bill Zuckert A writer has himself committed to the hospital in an attempt to uncover damaging material for an article.
142	15	"If You Play Your Cards Right, You Too Can Be a Loser"	Vince Edwards (credited as Vincent Edwards)	John T. Dugan & Howard Dimsdale (credited as Arthur Dales)	December 27, 1965
Guest stars: Nick Dennis, David Jones, Yvonne Craig, Duke Farley, Gary Haynes, Craig Hundley, Vincent Gardenia, Lloyd Gough, Louise Latham, John McLiam, Dolores Quinton, Otto Waldis, After the daughter (Y. Craig) of Stefan Dyboski sustains a brain injury, he files a criminal complaint against her husband, Gregg Carter (Jones). However, he's unaware that Carter is under observation at the hospital.
143	16	"In Case of Emergency, Cry Havoc"	Harvey Hart	Howard Browne & Steven W. Carabatsos	January 3, 1966
Guest stars: Henry Beckman, Geraldine Brooks, John Crowther, Vincent Gardenia, Kathy Garver, Lauren Gilbert, Lloyd Gough, Virginia Gregg, Craig Hundley, Gregory Morton Despite the need for immediate surgery after William Benbrook slips into a coma, Dr. Casey must convince his wife Leona (Brooks) that the miracle drug that she's read about won't help him.
144	17	"Meantime, We Shall Express Our Darker Purpose"	John Meredyth Lucas	Steven W. Carabatsos & Ben Fox	January 10, 1966
Guest stars: Robert Burr, Vincent Gardenia, Virginia Gregg, Craig Hundley, Richard Karlan, Peter Lazer, Judi Meredith, Alfred Ryder, Joey Tata A hit-and-run driver (Alfred Ryder) confesses his crime to a priest, with Dr. Casey later accusing the priest of interfering with medical procedure.
145	18	"For San Diego, You Need a Different Bus"	Harry Landers	Howard Dimsdale (credited as Arthur Dales) & Barry Oringer	January 17, 1966
Guest stars: Indus Arthur, Wolfe Barzell, Sidney Blackmer, Dane Clark, Ann Elder, Edmund Gilbert, Virginia Gregg, Joseph Mell, Judi Meredith, Greg Mullavey, Davis Roberts Despite heart trouble that results in him being hospitalized, a rabble-rousing writer (Dane Clark) refuses to give Dr. Casey and details of his medical history.
146	19	"Smile, Baby, Smile, It's Only Twenty Dols of Pain"	Gerald Mayer	Harold Gast	January 24, 1966
Guest stars: Indus Arthur, Sidney Blackmer, Edmund Gilbert, Joanne Gilbert, Virginia Gregg, Pamela McMyler, Judi Meredith, Jan Shutan, Dana Wynter Eva Robinson (Wynter) has painful facial neuralgia, causing her to beg Dr. Casey to operate, despite the fact that she would become disfigured.
147	20	"Fun and Games and Other Tragic Things"	Alan Crosland Jr.	Howard Dimsdale (credited as Arthur Dales) & Chester Krumholz	January 31, 1966
Guest stars: Frank Aletter, Indus Arthur, Sidney Blackmer, Edmund Gilbert, Virginia Gregg, Heidy Hunt, Judi Meredith, Noam Pitlik, Jan Shutan, Dolores Sutton After being diagnosed with terminal brain cancer and given a year to live, Paula Jordan decides to enjoy life and develops a crush on Dr. Casey in the process.
148	21	"Weave Nets to Catch the Wind"	Marc Daniels	Story by : Tina Pine (credited as Tina Rome)	February 7, 1966
Guest stars: Indus Arthur, Sidney Blackmer, Jeanne Cooper, Ed Gilbert, Lenore Kingston, David Ladd, Gene Lyons, Judi Meredith, Noam Pitlik, Jan Shutan Anna Medalle (Cooper) is a controlling and stubborn mother who attempts to hide symptoms of a serious illness from her son.
149	22	"Lullaby for a Wind-Up Toy"	John Meredyth Lucas	Story by : Richard Bartlett & Richard Leichester (credited as William S. Leicester)	February 14, 1966
Guest stars: Indus Arthur, Sidney Blackmer, Brooke Bundy, Jack Carter, Murray MacLeod, Sherwood Price, Willard Sage An unwed and pregnant teenager (Brooke Bundy) is involved in an accident, but refuses to undergo necessary surgery because of her fear that the operation will kill her unborn child.
150	23	"Where Did All the Roses Go?"	Marc Daniels and Jud Taylor	Story by : Barbara Merlin & Milton Merlin	February 21, 1966
Guest stars: Matt Clark, Kim Darby, Ned Glass, Viveca Lindfors, Joe Macross, Jayne Massey, Sherwood Price Owen Carter, whose identical twin brother Oren needs brain surgery after a traffic accident, experiences sympathetic pain. Even though Dr. Casey has determined that the injured man is in no condition to have the operation, a nurse decides to reverse his orders.
151	24	"Twenty Six Ways to Spell Heartbreak: A, B, C, D..."	Harry Landers	Robert Guy Barrows & Meredith Sklar	February 28, 1966
Guest stars: Margaret Blye, Jhean Burton, Florida Friebus, Ned Glass, Christopher Harris, Peter Haskell, Robert Lipton, Carole Mathews, Sherwood Price, Jack Weston Floyd Allen (Harris) is an 8-year-old boy who's hospitalized after attacking his teacher. A subsequent analysis determines that he has brain damage that can be controlled through both medical and psychiatric treatment.
152	25	"Pull the Wool Over Your Eyes, Here Comes the Cold Wind of Truth"	Jud Taylor	Story by : Teddi Sherman, Judith Plowden, & Allan Scott; Teleplay by : Howard Dimsdale (credited as Arthur Dales) & Barry Oringer	March 14, 1966
Guest stars: Margaret Blye, Sam Groom, Peter Haskell, Robert Lipton, Juliet Mills, Jeanne Vaughn Dr. Casey must deal with two patients who attempt to self-diagnose their illnesses: Joan Lloyd (Mills) is a librarian who believes psychosis is behind her headaches, while Jerry Brewster (Lipton) is a pianist who believes that an organic cause is behind pain in his hands.
153	26	"Then, Suddenly, Panic"	Marc Daniels	Dean Riesner	March 21, 1966
Guest stars: Janet Blair, Richard Collier, Kathryn Grant, (credited as Kathryn Crosby), Edith Leslie, Buddy Lewis, Gavin MacLeod, Bryan O'Byrne, Alice Rodriguez Two patients in the same room at the hospital have similar issues: Pat Mason (Grant) looks to have brain damage, while Charlie Boyd, a singer and dancer, could have a brain tumor.

== Home releases ==
DVD box sets:	Ref.
Ben Casey TV Series-Volume ONE-4 Disc Set-20 Classic Episodes-1961	
Ben Casey TV Series- 20 Classic Episodes -4 Disc Set-Volume TWO	
Ben Casey- TV Series- 20 Classic Episodes-4 Disc Set-Volume THREE	

The complete first season of Ben Casey is available on DVD in 2 volumes from CBS Home Entertainment. Volume 1 contains the first 16 episodes; the last 16 episodes are in Volume 2.
