= Don Spruance =

American film, stage and television actor

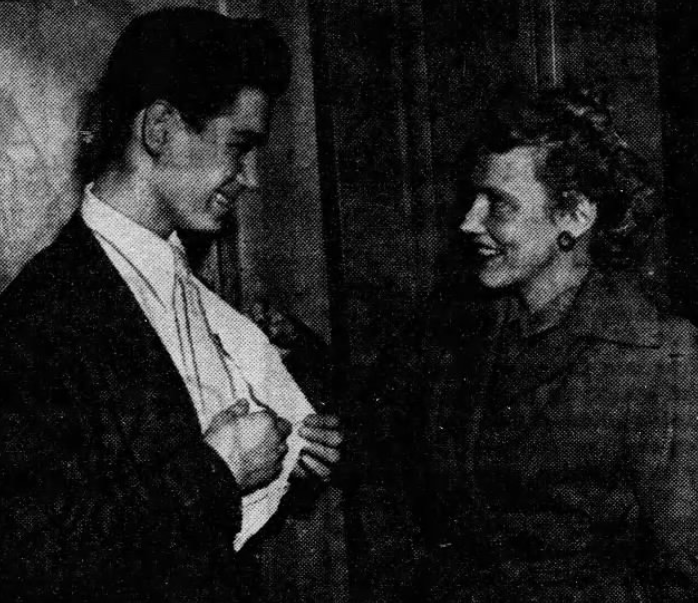
- Spruance (left) with Hazel Turney, 1950
- Born: Donald W. Spruance; November 17, 1933 (age 91); San Francisco, California, U.S.
- Occupation(s): Film, stage and television actor

Donald W. Spruance (born November 17, 1933) is an American film, stage and television actor. He is known for playing Dr. Robert Ward in the American medical drama television series Ben Casey.

== Life and career ==
Spruance was born in San Francisco, California, the son of William Donald Sr., an insurance broker, and Joyce Spruance. He was originally a dancer. He began his stage career in the 1950s, appearing in numerous stage productions and summer stock theaters. He then began his screen career in 1960, appearing in the film Ma Barker's Killer Brood. In the same year, he appeared in the television programs Wrangler and Dennis the Menace. During his screen career, he worked as an insurance executive.

Later in his career, in 1961, Spruance starred as Dr. Robert Ward of the ABC medical drama television series Ben Casey, starring along with Vince Edwards, Sam Jaffe, Harry Landers, Jeanne Bates, Nick Dennis and John Zaremba. After leaving the series in 1964, he guest-starred in television programs including Gunsmoke, 12 O'Clock High, The Fugitive, The Twilight Zone, Redigo, The F.B.I. and The Donna Reed Show, and also in films such as This Is Not a Test, Pickup on 101 and Father Goose.

Spruance retired from acting in 1977, last appearing in the ABC crime drama television series The Streets of San Francisco.
