= Ben Casey =

American medical drama television series

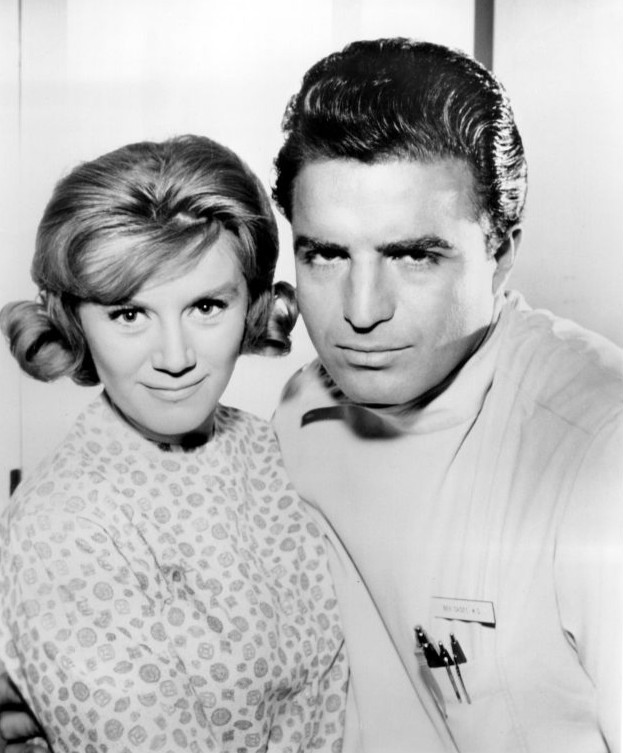
- Vince Edwards as Ben Casey and guest star Kathleen Nolan, 1964
- Created by: James E. Moser
- Starring: Vince Edwards; Sam Jaffe; Bettye Ackerman; Nick Dennis; Jeanne Bates; Don Spruance; Franchot Tone; John Zaremba; Ben Piazza; Jim McMullan; Gregory Morton; Stella Stevens; Marlyn Mason; Harry Landers; Linda Lawson
- Theme music composer: David Raksin
- Country of origin: United States
- Original language: English
- No. of seasons: 5
- No. of episodes: 153 (list of episodes)

Production
- Running time: 60 minutes
- Production company: Bing Crosby Productions

Original release
- Network: ABC
- Release: October 2, 1961 – March 21, 1966

Related
- The Return of Ben Casey (TV movie, 1988)

Ben Casey is an American medical drama television series that aired on ABC from 1961 to 1966. The show was known for its opening titles, which consisted of a hand drawing the symbols "♂, ♀, ✳, †, ∞" on a chalkboard, as cast member Sam Jaffe said "Man, woman, birth, death, infinity." Neurosurgeon Joseph Ransohoff served as a medical consultant for the show.

== Plot ==
The series stars Vince Edwards as medical doctor Ben Casey, the young, intense, and idealistic chief resident and neurosurgeon at County General Hospital. His mentor is chief of neurosurgery Doctor David Zorba, played by Sam Jaffe, who, in the pilot episode, tells a colleague that Casey is "the best chief resident this place has known in 20 years." In its first season, the series and Vince Edwards were nominated for Emmy awards. Additional nominations at the 14th Primetime Emmy Awards on May 22, 1962 went to Sam Jaffe, Jeanne Cooper (for the episode "But Linda Only Smiled"), Joan Hackett (for the episode "A Certain Time, a Certain Darkness"), and George C. Scott (for the episode "I Remember a Lemon Tree"). In its second season, the series garnered several more Emmy nominations, with Glenda Farrell and Kim Stanley both winning for the episode "A Cardinal Act of Mercy". The show began running multi-episode stories, starting with the first five episodes of season four; Casey developed a romantic relationship with Jane Hancock (Stella Stevens), who had emerged from a coma after 15 years. At the beginning of season five (the last season), Jaffe left the show, and Franchot Tone replaced Zorba as the new chief of neurosurgery

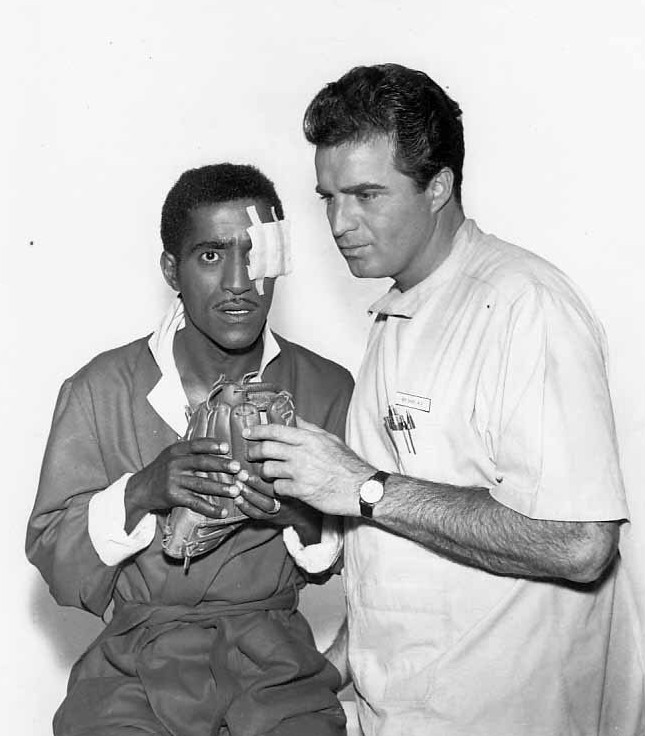
Vince Edwards as Ben Casey with guest star Sammy Davis, Jr. in the television show Ben Casey (1963)

== Cast ==
- Vince Edwards as Dr. Ben Casey
- Sam Jaffe as Dr. David Zorba (1961–1965)
- Harry Landers as Dr. Ted Hoffman
- Bettye Ackerman as Dr. Maggie Graham (in real life, Bettye Ackerman was married to Sam Jaffe)
- Nick Dennis as Orderly Nick Kanavaras
- Jeanne Bates as Nurse Wills
- Don Spruance as Dr. Robert Ward
- Franchot Tone as Dr. Daniel Niles Freeland (1965–1966)
- John Zaremba as Dr. Harold Jensen
- Ben Piazza as Dr. Mike Rogers (1964)
- Jim McMullan as Dr. Terry McDaniel
- Gregory Morton as Walter Williams (1965–1966)
- Stella Stevens as Jane Hancock
- Marlyn Mason as Sally Weldon
- Sherwood Price as Owen Carter (recurring role)
- Ed Gilbert as Robert Cramer (recurring role)
- Hari Rhodes as Gunner Garrison (recurring role)
- Barton Heyman as Dr. Paul Cain (recurring role)
- Sidney Blackmer as Dr. Morgan Granger (recurring role)

== Production notes ==
Creator James E. Moser based the character of Ben Casey on Dr. Allan Max Warner, a neurosurgeon whom Moser met while researching Ben Casey. Warner served as the program's original technical advisor in 1961. According to an article in TV Guide (September 30 – October 6, 1961), he worked with the actors to show them how to handle medical instruments,

Ben Casey had several directors, including Irvin Kershner and Sydney Pollack. Its theme music was written by David Raksin, and it is played in 5/4 time signature; a version performed by pianist Valjean was a Billboard Top 40 hit in the United States, peaking at number 28 on 23 June 1962.

Filmed at the Desilu Studios, the series was produced by Bing Crosby Productions.

=== Spin-off ===
Vince Edwards appeared on the television series Breaking Point as Ben Casey. The episode was "Solo for B-Flat Clarinet" and debuted 16 September 1963. Both Ben Casey and Breaking Point were produced by Bing Crosby Productions. Cast members of Breaking Point also had guest roles on Ben Casey.

== Episodes ==
| Season | Episodes | Originally released | |
| Season | Episodes | First released | Last released |
|---|---|---|---|
| 1 | 32 | October 2, 1961 | May 28, 1962 |
| 2 | 31 | October 1, 1962 | May 13, 1963 |
| 3 | 33 | September 9, 1963 | April 22, 1964 |
| 4 | 31 | September 14, 1964 | May 17, 1965 |
| 5 | 26 | September 13, 1965 | March 21, 1966 |

Original run

The most frequent time slot for the series is in bold text.

- **Monday at 10–11 p.m. on ABC: October 2, 1961 – May 13, 1963; September 14, 1964 – March 21, 1966**
- Wednesday at 9–10 p.m. on ABC: September 9, 1963 – April 22, 1964

== Home media ==
On October 9, 2019, CBS Home Entertainment released the first season on DVD in 2 volume sets.

| DVD name | No. of episodes | Release date |
|---|---|---|
| Season 1, Volume 1 | 16 | October 9, 2019 |
| Season 1, Volume 2 | 16 | October 9, 2019 |

== Reception ==
Due to the combination of The Beverly Hillbillies and The Dick Van Dyke Show, Ben Casey returned to its original Monday-night time slot in the fall of 1964, remaining there until its cancellation in March 1966. Daytime repeats of the series aired on ABC's weekday schedule from 1965 through 1967.

Nielsen ratings

NOTE: The highest average rating for the series is in bold text.

| Season | Rank | Rating |
|---|---|---|
| 1) 1961–1962 | #18 | 23.7 |
| 2) 1962–1963 | #7 | **28.7** (tied with The Danny Thomas Show) |
| 3) 1963–1964 | not in the top 30 | |
| 4) 1964–1965 | not in the top 30 | |
| 5) 1965–1966 | not in the top 30 | |

== Television series tie-ins ==
=== Comics ===
Both a comic strip and a comic book were based on the television series. The strip was developed and written by Jerry Capp (né Caplin) and drawn by Neal Adams. The daily comic strip began on November 26, 1962, and the Sunday strip debuted on September 20, 1964. Both ended on July 31, 1966 (a Sunday). The daily strip was reprinted in The Menomonee Falls Gazette. The comic book was published by Dell Comics for 10 issues from 1962 to 1964. All had photo covers, except for that of the final issue, which was drawn by John Tartaglione.

=== Novels ===
From 1962 through 1963, the paperback publisher Lancer Books issued four original novels based on the series. They were Ben Casey by William Johnston, A Rage for Justice by Norman Daniels, The Strength of His Hands by Sam Elkin, and The Fire Within, again by Daniels, small-print standard mass-market size paperbacks of 128 or 144 pages each. The covers of the books featured photographs of Edwards as Casey, or in the case of the third novel, a drawing of a doctor with Edwards' appearance.

== 1988 television film The Return of Ben Casey ==
In 1988, the TV movie The Return of Ben Casey, with Vince Edwards reprising his role as Casey, aired in syndication. Harry Landers was the only other original cast member to reprise his role (as Dr. Ted Hoffman). The film was directed by Joseph L. Scanlan. The pilot was not picked up by the major networks to bring the series back.

== In popular culture ==
In 1962, the series inspired the semicomic rock song "Callin' Dr. Casey", written and performed by songwriter John D. Loudermilk. In the song, Loudermilk refers to the TV doctor's wide-ranging medical abilities and asks whether Casey has any cure for heartbreak. The song reached number 83 on the Billboard Hot 100 chart.

During the Vietnam War, the term "Ben Casey" was used by American troops as slang for a medic.

In the popular Japanese medical drama Doctor-X: Surgeon Michiko Daimon the office cat is named Ben Casey.

In the Martin Scorsese film Goodfellas, after shooting another character in the foot, Tommy DeVito jokingly tells his associates to take the injured man to Ben Casey.

There is a street named Ben Casey Drive in San Antonio, Texas.

Nintendo composer Hirokazu Tanaka heavily used samples in his tracks for the 1994 game EarthBound. One of them, named "Your Name, Please", sampled Sam Jaffe saying "infinity" from the show's intro.

=== Parodies ===
Cleveland, Ohio's late-night movie program The Hoolihan and Big Chuck Show and its successor program The Big Chuck and Lil' John Show regularly aired comedy skits under the title "Ben Crazy" that parodied Ben Casey. The skits opened with a spoof of the chalkboard sequence, adding one more symbol at the end — a dollar sign ($), accompanied by a laugh track. "Big Chuck" Schodowski, one of the hosts of the show, said that the skits continued to air for so many years after the 1966 cancellation of Ben Casey that younger viewers probably did not recognize the opening and that real-life doctors would send in ideas for skits, some of which were used on the show.

Dickie Goodman released a novelty song in 1962 titled "Ben Crazy" that parodied Ben Casey as "Ben Crazy" and Dr. Zorba as "Dr. Smorba", and it parodied Dr. Kildare, the main character on another popular 1960s medical drama series. Goodman's recording used his "break-in" technique of sampling lines from then-popular songs to "answer" comedic questions; it sampled the Ben Casey title sequence and theme. The record reached number 44 on the Billboard Hot 100.

The Flintstones featured several parodies of Ben Casey:

- "The Blessed Event" (season three, episode 23, 1963) features the birth of Pebbles Flintstone. While wandering around the hospital looking for the maternity ward, Fred Flintstone runs into caricatures of Ben Casey and Dr. Zorba. They help Fred on his way, and then walk into a TV studio (which is inexplicably in a hospital), as Fred remarks that they seemed awfully familiar.
- "Ann-Margrock Presents" (season four, episode 1, 1963) features a dentist named Ben Cavity, who is a parody of Ben Casey.
- "Monster Fred" (season five, episode two, 1964) featured a mad doctor character named "Len Frankenstone" (voiced by Allan Melvin) and his associate "Dr. Zero" (voiced by Doug Young). These characters were parodies of Ben Casey and Dr. Zorba.

In "My Husband Is Not a Drunk", a 1962 episode of The Dick Van Dyke Show, a hypnotized Rob addresses the bald Mel Cooley as "Dr. Zorba", a rare instance of the show referencing another TV series.

The veterinarian in The Simpsons, first introduced in the episode "Dog of Death" performing surgery on Santa's Little Helper, was based on Ben Casey. In addition, the Springfield Hospital motif played at the start of a Hospital-based scene is based on the opening of the Ben Casey musical theme.

In his song "One Hippopotomi", a parody of "What Kind of Fool Am I?" by Anthony Newley, Allan Sherman sings the lyrics: "When Ben Casey meets Kildare, that's called a paradox."

In the 1966 Batman episode “Rats Like Cheese”, the Dynamic Duo are brought to a hospital because Mr. Freeze froze them solid. Chief O’Hara refers to the Ben Casey-lookalike doctor as Vince. Dr. Vince yells back in Ben Casey fashion that he’s doing all he can.
