= The Old Man Who Cried Wolf =

1970 American television thriller film directed by Walter Grauman

- Cover of 1980 VHS release
- Written by: Luther Davis
- Directed by: Walter Grauman
- Starring: Edward G. Robinson; Martin Balsam; Diane Baker; Ruth Roman; Percy Rodrigues; Sam Jaffe
- Music by: Robert Drasnin
- Country of origin: United States
- Original language: English

Production
- Executive producer: Aaron Spelling
- Producer: Walter Grauman
- Cinematography: Arch R. Dalzell
- Editor: Art Seid
- Running time: 73 minutes
- Production company: Aaron Spelling Productions

Original release
- Network: ABC
- Release: October 13, 1970

The Old Man Who Cried Wolf is a 1970 American made-for-television thriller film directed by Walter Grauman and starring Edward G. Robinson, Martin Balsam and Diane Baker. It originally aired as the ABC Movie of the Week on October 13, 1970.

== Plot ==
Robinson portrays an elderly man who witnesses the murder of a friend.

== Cast ==
- Edward G. Robinson as Emile Pulska
- Martin Balsam as Stanley Pulska
- Diane Baker as Peggy Pulska
- Ruth Roman as Lois
- Percy Rodrigues as Frank Jones
- Sam Jaffe as Abe Stillman
- Edward Asner as Dr. Morheim
- Martin E. Brooks as Hudson F. Ewing
- Jay C. Flippen as Pawnbroker

== Production ==
Robinson described it as "a most rewarding experience, one which I thoroughly enjoyed". Writer Luther Davis adapted the movie from a story by Arnold Horwitt.

== Reception ==
The film was very well received by critics. Robinson's performance was critically acclaimed and was suggested for awards. It was the seventh most-watched primetime program in the United States for the week upon its debut.

The Hollywood Reporter called Robinson's performance "strong and moving".

The Los Angeles Times said Robinson's performance was "filled with skill and nuance" but the film "broke your heart by being a cop out of what it might have been."
