= Pickup on 101 =

Film directed by John Florea

- Theatrical release poster
- Directed by: John Florea
- Written by: Anthony Blake
- Produced by: Ed Garner; Chris Whittaker
- Starring: Jack Albertson; Lesley Ann Warren; Martin Sheen; Hal Baylor; George Chandler; Robert Donner
- Cinematography: Brick Marquard
- Music by: Stu Phillips
- Production company: Christian Whittaker Ltd.
- Distributed by: American International Pictures
- Release date: May 1972
- Running time: 93 minutes
- Country: United States
- Language: English

Pickup on 101 is a 1972 American drama film directed by John Florea and written by Anthony Blake. The film stars Jack Albertson, Lesley Ann Warren, Martin Sheen, Hal Baylor, George Chandler and Robert Donner. The film was released in May 1972, by American International Pictures.

== Plot ==
An elderly wanderer, a sexy young girl running away from home and a folk singer looking for stardom hitch-hike their way cross-country, trying to get to California.

== Cast ==
- Jack Albertson as Jedediah Bradley
- Lesley Ann Warren as Nicky
- Martin Sheen as Lester Baumgartner
- Hal Baylor as Railroad cop
- George Chandler as Pawnshop owner
- Robert Donner as Jesse
- Eddie Firestone as Auto Mechanic
- William Lally as Motorist
- William Mims as Antique Shop Owner
- Michael Ontkean as Chuck
- Mike Road as Desk Sergeant
- Don Spruance as Highway Patrolman
- Harold J. Stone as 2nd Farmer
- Buck Young as Car Family of Four
- Peggy Stewart as Car Family of Four
- Greg Young as Car Family of Four
- Chuck Dorsett as Motorist
- Kathleen Harper as Jesse's Wife
- Earl Brown as R.R. Worker
- Shayna Rockwell as 1st Waitress
- Dorothy Brewer as Motel Maid
- Shirley Hayward as Motel Family
- Serina Rockwell as Motel Family
- Rick Rockwell as Motel Family
- Sandra Rockwell as Motel Family
