= Norman Jacob =

Welsh cricketer

Norman Ernest Jacob
Personal information
- Full name: Norman Ernest Jacob
- Born: 9 July 1901; Neath, Glamorgan, Wales
- Died: 12 March 1970 (aged 68); Grimsby, Lincolnshire, England
- Batting: Right-handed
- Bowling: Right-arm medium

Domestic team information
- Years: Team
- 1922: Glamorgan

Career statistics
Competition	FC
Matches	7
Runs scored	79
Batting average	6.07
100s/50s	–/–
Top score	19
Balls bowled	42
Wickets	–
Bowling average	–
5 wickets in innings	–
10 wickets in match	–
Best bowling	–
Catches/stumpings	2/–
- Source: Cricinfo, 3 July 2010

Norman Ernest Jacob (9 July 1901 – 12 March 1970) was a Welsh cricketer. Jacob was a right-handed batsman who bowled right-arm medium pace. He was born at Neath, Glamorgan.

Jacob made his first-class debut Glamorgan in the 1922 County Championship against Lancashire at Old Trafford, Manchester. He played a further 6 first-class matches in the 1922 season, with his final first-class appearance for the county coming against Leicestershire at Cardiff Arms Park. In his 7 first-class matches, he scored 79 runs at a batting average of 6.07, with a top score of 19.

Jacob died at Grimsby, Lincolnshire on 12 March 1970.
