= Harry Landers =

American actor

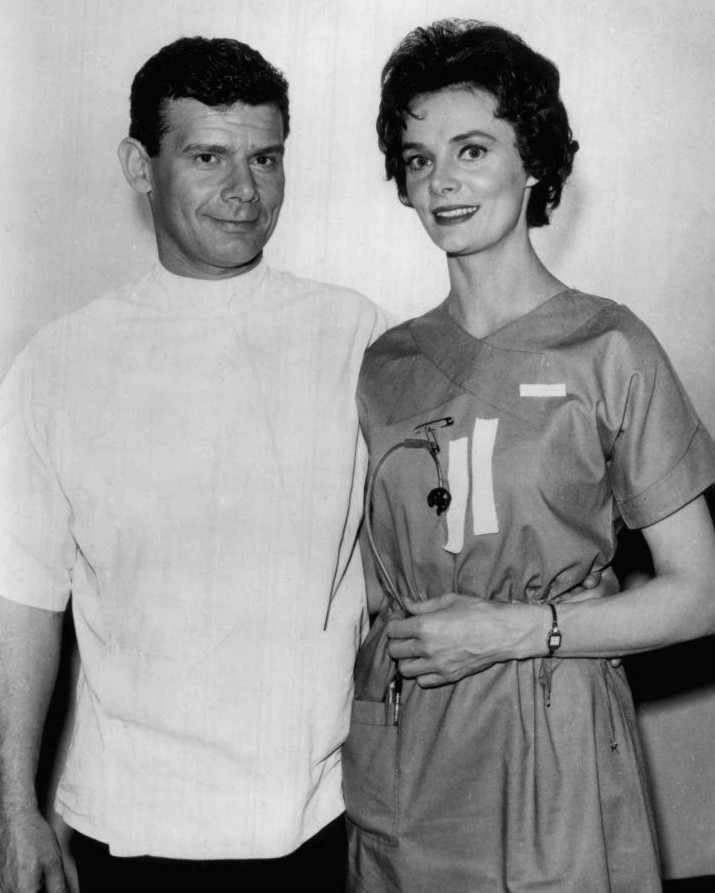
- Landers with Bettye Ackerman in Ben Casey (1961)
- Born: Harry Sorokin; September 3, 1921; New York City, New York U.S.
- Died: September 10, 2017 (aged 96)
- Occupation: Actor
- Years active: 1947–1991

Harry Landers (born Harry Sorokin; September 3, 1921 – September 10, 2017) was an American character actor.

== Early life and career ==
Harry Sorokin was born in New York City in 1921. His education came at Public School No. 202 and Thomas Jefferson High School in Brooklyn.

During World War II, Landers served in the United States Merchant Marine.

In the mid-1940s, he began his career as a worker at the Warner Bros. studio in California. An encounter with actress Bette Davis led to a membership of Screen Actors Guild and an acting career.

On Broadway, Landers appeared in A Flag is Born (1948) and Billy Budd. He gained additional theatrical experience in summer stock theatre.

Landers was the spokesman for Taster's Choice coffee in television commercials that aired in the 1970s. He played "Go Go" in the 1953 classic, The Wild One. He had a regular role as Dr. Ted Hoffman on the television series Ben Casey and co-starred in the TV movie The Return of Ben Casey (1988). He had a small role in the Alfred Hitchcock film Rear Window (1954). He played multiple roles in Cecil B. DeMille's epic The Ten Commandments (1956). In 1957, Landers played murder victim Donald Briggs in the Perry Mason episode The Case of the Drowning Duck. He also appeared in 1966 on Combat! in the 5th-season episode, "The Losers". He played Dr. Arthur Coleman, who aided Sandra Smith's Dr.Janice Lester, as she attempted to take over Kirk's body in Season 3 Episode 24 of the original Star Trek television series, "Turnabout Intruder", which aired June 3, 1969. It was the final episode of the original series.

== Death ==
Landers died September 10, 2017, aged 96.

== Filmography ==
=== Film ===
Year	Title	Role	Notes
1947	Boomerang		Uncredited
1947	Kiss of Death	Convict	Uncredited
1949	C-Man	Owney Shor	
1950	Guilty Bystander	Bert	
1950	Undercover Girl	Tully Mertz Vista	
1951	Mister Universe	Henchman	
1953	Phantom from Space	Lieutenant Bowers	
1953	Jack Slade	Danton Son	Uncredited
1953	The Wild One	GoGo	Uncredited
1954	Drive a Crooked Road	Ralph	
1954	Prisoner of War	Lieutenant	Uncredited
1954	About Mrs. Leslie	Soldier	Uncredited
1954	Return from the Sea	Quartermaster McGivern	
1954	Rear Window	Guest of Miss Lonelyhearts	Uncredited
1955	The Cobweb	Intern	Uncredited
1955	The Indian Fighter	Grey Wolf / Captain Trask Attaché	
1956	The Ten Commandments	Architect's assistant / Hebrew at Rameses' gate	
1956	The Black Whip	Fiddler	
1957	Mister Cory	Andy	
1957	The Walter Winchell File	Major Daley	TV series
1959	Up Periscope	Adams	Uncredited
1960	The Gallant Hours	Captain Joseph Foss	
1968	In Enemy Country	Pilot	
1968	Massacre Harbor	Colonel 'Spic' Landers USA	
1969	Charro!	Heff	
1990	Ragin' Cajun	Lacy	
1990	Mom	Bartender	
1990	Hollywood Heartbreak	Chuck Starrman	

=== Selected television appearances ===
- Alfred Hitchcock Presents (1955) (Season 1 Episode 7: "Breakdown") as Coroner
- Alfred Hitchcock Presents (1960) (Season 5 Episode 20: "The Day of the Bullet") as Joe
- Alfred Hitchcock Presents (1961) (Season 6 Episode 38: "Ambition") as Ernie Stillinger

== Television ==
Year	Title	Role	Notes
1969	Star Trek: The Original Series	Dr. Coleman	S3:E24, "Turnabout Intruder"
