= Sam Jaffe =

American actor (1891-1984)

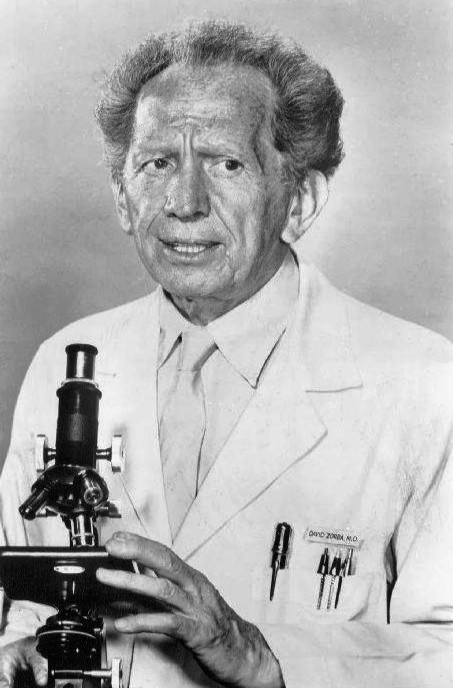
- Jaffe as David Zorba in Ben Casey, 1961
- Born: Shalom Jaffe; March 10, 1891; New York City, New York, U.S.
- Died: March 24, 1984 (aged 93); Beverly Hills, California, U.S.
- Resting place: Williston Cemetery in Williston, South Carolina
- Other names: Samuel Jaffe; Sam C. Jaffe
- Education: City College of New York (B.Sc. Engineering, 1912); Columbia University
- Occupations: Actor; teacher
- Years active: 1916–1984
- Spouses: Lillian Taiz (m. 1926; died 1941) Bettye Ackerman (m. 1956)

Shalom "Sam" Jaffe (March 10, 1891 – March 24, 1984) was an American actor and teacher, known for his portrayals of intelligent but eccentric characters. He achieved prominence in Hollywood for his portrayal of the titular character in the adventure film Gunga Din (1939). He was nominated for the Academy Award for Best Supporting Actor and won the Volpi Cup for Best Actor for his performance in the classic film noir The Asphalt Jungle (1950).

Jaffe subsequently played notable roles in films like The Day the Earth Stood Still (1951), Ben-Hur (1959), and Bedknobs and Broomsticks (1971). He also had a co-starring role as neurosurgeon Dr. David Zorba on the television medical drama Ben Casey (1961–65), which earned him a Primetime Emmy Award nomination in 1962.

== Early life ==
Shalom Jaffe (Yiddish: שלום יפה) was born to Ukrainian Jewish parents Heida (Ada) (Note: Yiddish: אידאַ יאַפֿע; Ukrainian: Іда Яффе; Russian: Ида Яффе) and Barnett Jaffe (Note: Yiddish: באַרנעט יאַפע; Ukrainian: Барнетт Яффе; Russian: Барнетт Яффе) at 97 Orchard Street (current location of the Lower East Side Tenement Museum) in New York City. His mother was a Yiddish actress in Odesa (then in the Russian Empire), prior to moving to the United States; his father was a jeweller. He was the youngest of four children; his siblings were Abraham, Sophie, and Annie.

As a child, he appeared in Yiddish theatre productions with his mother who, after moving to the United States, became a prominent actress and vaudeville star. He graduated from Townsend Harris High School and studied engineering at City College of New York, graduating in 1912. He later attended Columbia University for graduate studies. He also worked for several years as a teacher, and then dean, of mathematics at the Bronx Cultural Institute, a college preparatory school, before returning to acting in 1915.

As a young man, he lived in Greenwich Village in the same apartment building as a young John Huston. The two men became good friends and remained so for life. Jaffe was later to star in two of Huston's films: The Asphalt Jungle and The Barbarian and the Geisha.

== Career ==
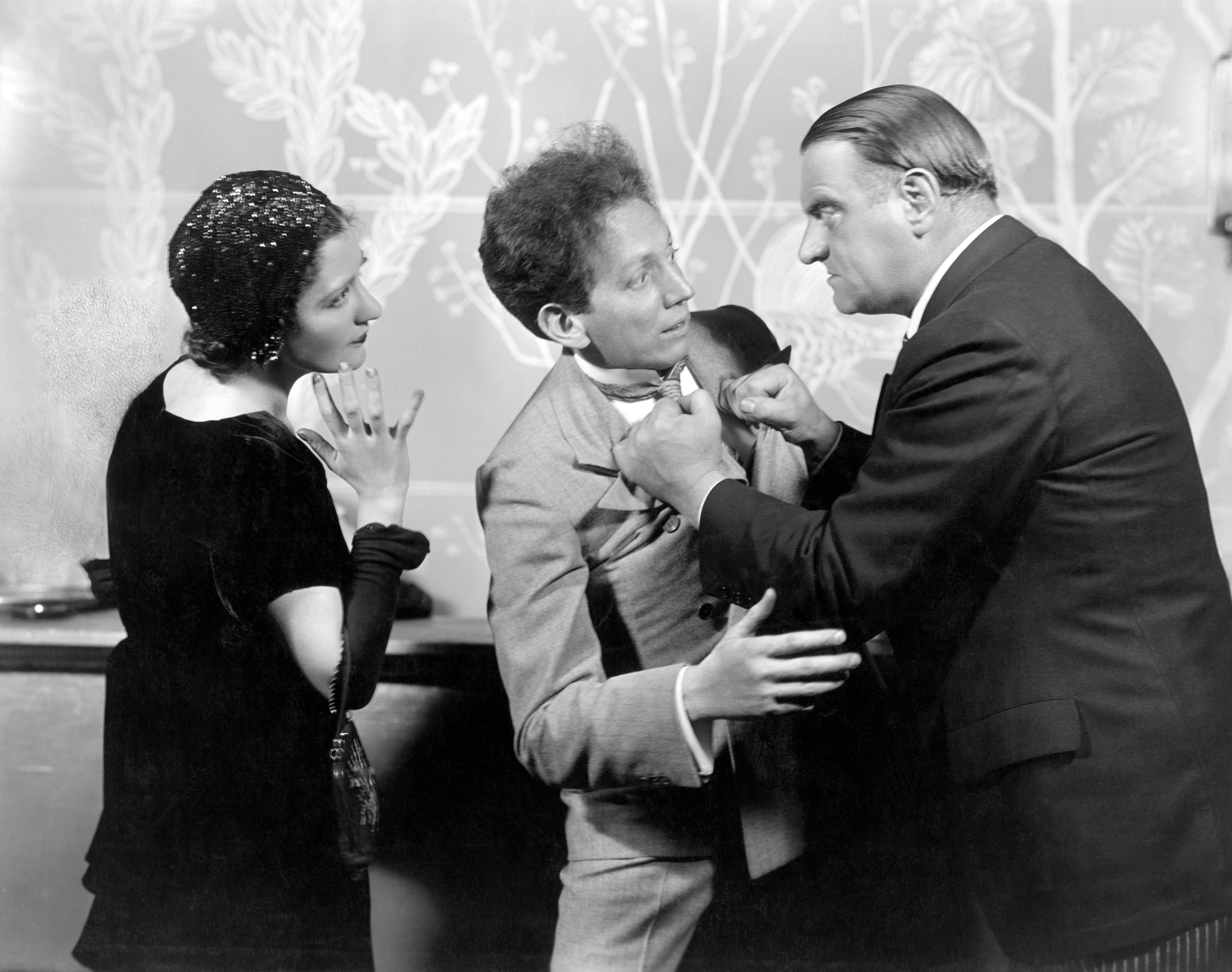
Hortense Alden, Jaffe and Sig Ruman in the original Broadway production of Grand Hotel (1930)

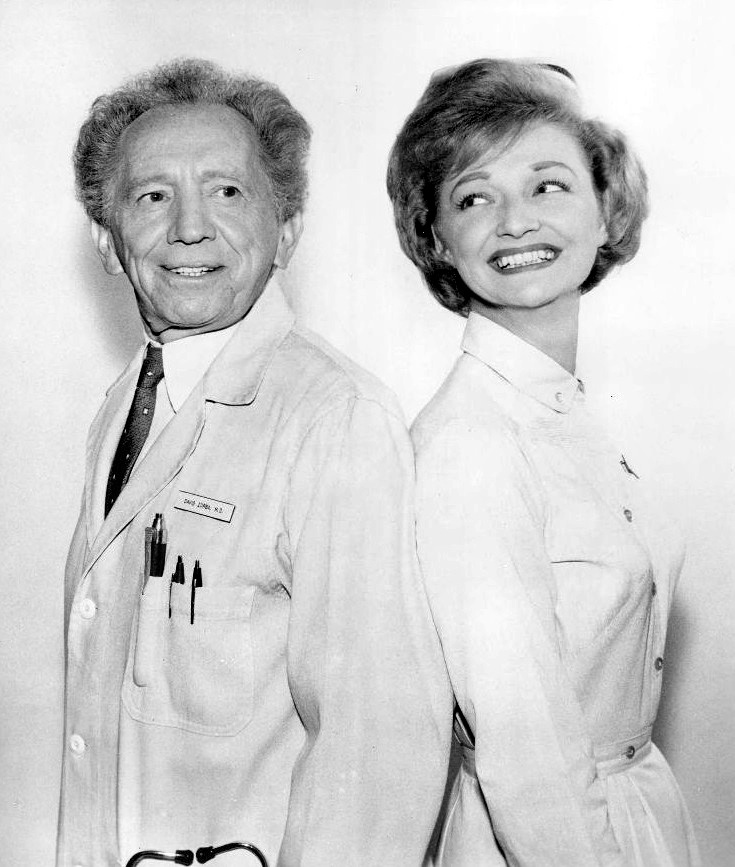
Jaffe and Ruth Foster on the set of Ben Casey

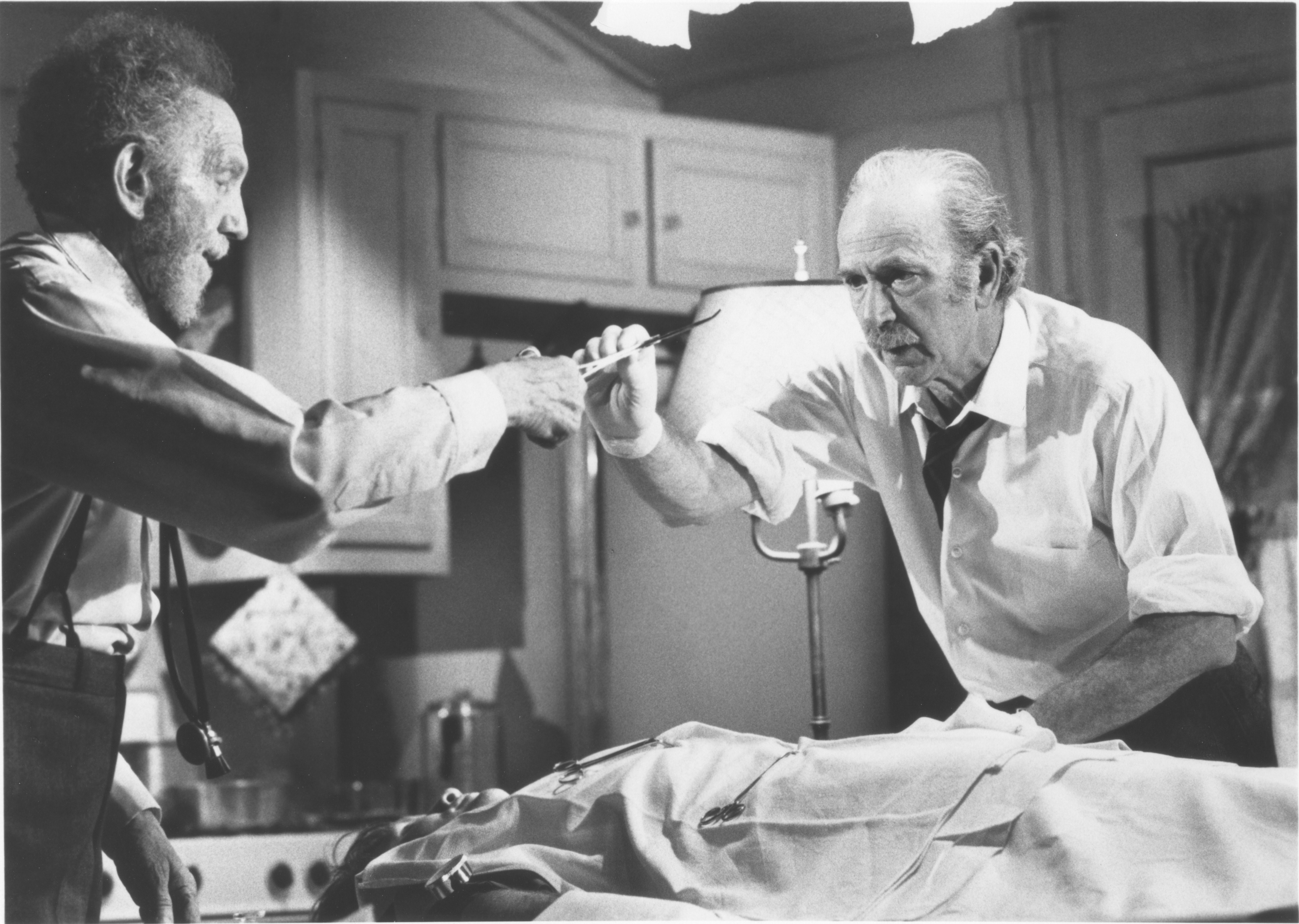
Jaffe (left) and Jack Albertson in the 1976 TV special The Sad and Lonely Sundays

=== Theatre ===
In 1923 he appeared in the Broadway premiere of God of Vengeance (Got fun Nekome) by Sholem Asch, as Reb Ali. The production became notorious after the cast, producer, and theatre owner were indicted and found guilty on charges of indecency in May 1923. Two years later, he played Yudelson in the original Broadway production of The Jazz Singer.

His other Broadway credits included Grand Hotel (1930–31), The Eternal Road (1937), A Doll's House (1937–38), and Cafe Crown (1942).

=== Film ===
Jaffe began to work in film in 1934, rising to prominence with his first role as the mad Tsar Peter III in The Scarlet Empress. In 1938, Jaffe was 47-years-old when he played the title role of bhisti (waterbearer) Gunga Din.

In 1950, he won the Best Actor Award at the Venice Film Festival for his portrayal of criminal mastermind "Doc" Erwin Riedenschneider in John Huston's film noir The Asphalt Jungle. He was also nominated for an Academy Award for his performance.

Jaffe was blacklisted by the Hollywood movie studio bosses during the 1950s, supposedly for being a communist sympathizer. Despite being blacklisted, he was hired first by Robert Wise for The Day the Earth Stood Still and then by director William Wyler for his role in the 1959 Academy Award-winning version of Ben-Hur.

=== Television ===
Jaffe co-starred in the ABC television series, Ben Casey, as Dr. David Zorba from 1961 to 1965, alongside Vince Edwards. He was nominated for an Emmy Award for that role in 1962.

He also had many guest-starring roles on other series, including Batman (as Mr. Zoltan Zorba) and in the western Alias Smith and Jones. In 1975, he co-starred as a retired doctor who is murdered by Janet Leigh in the Columbo episode "Forgotten Lady". He also appeared with an all-star cast in the TV pilot film of Rod Serling's Night Gallery and as Emperor Norton in one episode of Bonanza.

== Personal life ==
Jaffe was married to American operatic soprano and musical comedy star Lillian Taiz from 1926 until her death from cancer in 1941. In 1956, he married actress Bettye Ackerman, 33 years his junior, with whom he later co-starred in Ben Casey. She died on November 1, 2006. He had no children from either marriage.

Jaffe's closest friends included Zero Mostel, Edward G. Robinson, Ray Bradbury, and Igor Stravinsky

=== Death ===
Jaffe died of cancer in Beverly Hills, California, in 1984, two weeks after his 93rd birthday. He was cremated at the Pasadena Crematory in Altadena, California, and his ashes were given to his surviving wife, Bettye and, upon her death in 2006, they were buried with her in Williston Cemetery, Williston, South Carolina.

== Filmography ==
=== Film ===
Year	Title	Role	Director	Notes
1916	A Cheap Vacation		P.D. Hugon	Short film
1934	The Scarlet Empress	Grand Duke Peter	Josef von Sternberg	
1934	We Live Again	Gregory Simonson	Rouben Mamoulian	
1937	Lost Horizon	The High Lama	Frank Capra	
1939	Gunga Din	Gunga Din	George Stevens	
1943	Stage Door Canteen	Himself	Frank Borzage	
1946	13 Rue Madeleine	Mayor Galimard	Henry Hathaway	
1947	Gentleman's Agreement	Prof. Fred Lieberman	Elia Kazan	
1949	The Accused	Dr. Romley	William Dieterle	
1949	Rope of Sand	Dr. Francis Hunter	William Dieterle	
1950	The Asphalt Jungle	"Doc" Erwin Riedenschneider	John Huston	
1951	I Can Get It for You Wholesale	Sam Cooper	Michael Gordon	
1951	The Day the Earth Stood Still	Prof. Jacob Barnhardt	Robert Wise	
1953	Main Street to Broadway	First Nighter	Tay Garnett	Uncredited
1957	Les Espions	Sam Cooper	Henri-Georges Clouzot	
1958	The Barbarian and the Geisha	Henry Heusken	John Huston	
1959	Ben-Hur	Simonides	William Wyler	
1967	A Guide for the Married Man	Shrink	Gene Kelly	Uncredited
1968	La Bataille de San Sebastian	Father Joseph	Henri Verneuil	
1969	The Great Bank Robbery	Lilac Bailey	Hy Averback	
1970	The Dunwich Horror	Old Whateley	Daniel Haller	
1970	Quarantined	Mr. Berryman	Leo Penn	
1970	The Old Man Who Cried Wolf	Abe Stillman	Walter Grauman	
1971	Bedknobs and Broomsticks	Bookman	Robert Stevenson	
1980	Battle Beyond the Stars	Dr. Hephaestus	Jimmy T. Murakami	
1984	On the Line	El Gabacho	José Luis Borau	
1984	Nothing Lasts Forever	Father Knickerbocker	Tom Schiller	

=== Television ===
Year	Title	Role	Notes
1960–61	Alfred Hitchcock Presents	The Abbot/Hal Ballew	2 episodes
1960–61	The Law and Mr. Jones	Martin Berger	2 episodes
1961	The Westerner	Old Man McKeen	Episode: "The Old Man"
1961	The Untouchables	Luigi Valcone	Episode: "Augie 'The Banker' Ciamino"
1961	Naked City	Lazslo Lubasz	Episode: "Economy of Death"
1961	The Islanders	Papa Matthews	Episode: "To Bell a Cat"
1961–65	Ben Casey	Dr. David Zorba	Main cast; Seasons 1-4
1965	Daniel Boone	Jed Tolsen	Episode: "The First Beau"
1966	Batman	Zoltan Zorbra	Episode: "Walk the Straight and Narrow"
1966	Bonanza	Joshua Norton	Episode: "The Emperor Norton"
1969	Night Gallery	Bleum	Segment: "The Escape Route"
1970	Quarantined	Berryman	TV movie
1970	The Old Man Who Cried Wolf	Abe Stillman	TV movie
1971–72	Alias Smith and Jones	Soapy Saunders	3 episodes
1971	Enemies	Gittelmann	TV movie
1971	Mooch	Himself	TV movie
1971	Who Killed the Mysterious Mr. Foster?	Toby	TV movie
1973	Saga of Sonora	Old Sam	TV movie
1973	The Snoop Sisters	Issac Waldersack	Episode: "Corpse and Robbers"
1974	QB VII	Dr. Mark Tessler	Miniseries
1974	The Best of Times	Rabbi Roth	
1974	The Streets of San Francisco	Alex Zubatuk	Episode: "Mr. Nobody"
1975	S.W.A.T.	Dr. Brunner	Episode: "Omega One"
1975	Columbo	Dr. Henry Willis	Episode: "Forgotten Lady"
1975	Harry O	Dr. Howard Cambridge	Episode: "The Acolyte"
1976	The Bionic Woman	Admiral Richter	Episode: "Kill Oscar: Part 3"
1976	The Sad and Lonely Sundays	Dr. Sweeney	TV movie
1977	Kojak	Papa	Episode: "Tears for All Who Loved Her"
1980	Buck Rogers in the 25th Century	Council Leader	Episode: "Flight Of The War Witch"
1983	The Love Boat	Prof. Weber	Episode: "The Professor Has Class"
1984	Gideon's Trumpet	Supreme Court Justice	TV movie

== Awards and nominations ==
Institution	Year	Category	Work	Result	Ref.
Academy Awards	1951	Best Supporting Actor	The Asphalt Jungle	Nominated	
Primetime Emmy Awards	1962	Outstanding Supporting Actor	Ben Casey	Nominated	
Venice Film Festival	1950	Best Actor	The Asphalt Jungle	Won	
