= Bettye Ackerman =

American actress (1924–2006)

- Ackerman with Vince Edwards in 1960s television drama Ben Casey
- Born: Bettye Louise Ackerman; February 28, 1924; Cottageville, South Carolina U.S.
- Died: November 1, 2006 (aged 82); Columbia, South Carolina U.S.
- Other name: Bettye Ackerman Jaffe
- Occupations: Actress, artist
- Years active: 1953–1994
- Spouse: Sam Jaffe (m. 1956; died 1984)

Bettye Louise Ackerman (February 28, 1924 – November 1, 2006) was an American actress primarily known for her work on television.

== Early years ==
Ackerman was born in Cottageville, South Carolina (another source says she was born in Williston, South Carolina), the daughter of Clarence Kilgo Ackerman and Mary Baker Ackerman, and grew up in Williston, in Barnwell County in southwestern South Carolina, one of four children. She graduated from Columbia College in South Carolina in 1945 and left for New York City soon after. She studied theater at the graduate level at Columbia University in New York and pursued art studies with Joseph Mugnaini and George DeGroat at Otis Art Institute in Los Angeles.

== Television ==
From 1961 until 1966, Ackerman played Dr. Maggie Graham on the ABC medical drama Ben Casey. She played Anne Frazer on Bracken's World and the original Constance MacKenzie on the daytime program Return to Peyton Place. She appeared in an early episode of prime time soap Falcon Crest portraying the character of Elisabeth Bradbury. She also appeared in two episodes of Perry Mason, starring Raymond Burr: in 1965. she played the role of Amy Reid in the episode, "The Case of the Thermal Thief," and in 1966. she played Laura Brandon in "The Case of the Positive Negative." In 1972, she appeared in the Gunsmoke episode, “This Golden Land.” In 1977, she appeared in "Never Con a Killer," the pilot for the ABC crime drama The Feather and Father Gang.

== Stage ==
Ackerman played the title role in the one act play Salome, by Oscar Wilde, as part of the Alexander Kirkland Acting Group. The production was released on Magic-Tone Records (CTG 4011). Ackerman's Broadway credits include A Meeting by the River (1979).

== Film ==
Ackerman's film debut came in Face of Fire in 1959.

== Personal life ==
On June 7, 1956, Ackerman, at 32, married her future Ben Casey co-star Sam Jaffe, who was then 65. Although there was a 33-year difference in their ages, the couple had a very successful and happy marriage until Jaffe died of cancer in 1984. They had no children.

She sold her home in Beverly Hills, California, and returned to South Carolina to be near her large extended family in 1998. Shortly afterwards, she was diagnosed with Alzheimer's disease.

Ackerman was also a noted artist, who had numerous exhibits in both Beverly Hills and Columbia, South Carolina.

== Death ==
Ackerman died November 1, 2006, after having suffered a stroke in Columbia, South Carolina. She was 82.

She is buried in Williston Cemetery in South Carolina.

== Filmography ==
=== Film ===
Year	Title	Role	Notes
1959	Face of Fire	Grace Trescott	
1969	Rascal	Miss Whalen	
1991	Ted & Venus	Poetry Award Presenter	
1994	Prehysteria! 2	Miss Winters	Video

=== Television ===
Year	Title	Role	Notes
1953	The Philco Television Playhouse	Girl (uncredited)	Season 6 Episode 2: "The Bachelor Party"
1955	Studio One	Betty	Season 7 Episode 39: "The Incredible World of Horace Ford"
1959	Alfred Hitchcock Presents	Mrs. Inkel	Season 5 Episode 12: "Specialty of the House"
1961	Naked City	Susan Bognar	Season 2 Episode 25: "An Economy of Death"
1961	Insight	Ilsa Davis	Season 1 Episode 133: "Breakthrough"
1961–1966	Ben Casey	Dr. Maggie Graham	58 episodes
1962	The Alfred Hitchcock Hour	Lorna Dickson	Season 1 Episode 14: "The Tender Poisoner"
1962–1963	Alcoa Premiere	Ellen / Dorothy Swift	2 episodes
1964	Breaking Point	Eunice Osment	Season 1 Episode 18: "Better Than a Dead Lion"
1965–1966	Perry Mason	Amy Reid / Laura Brandon	2 episodes
1967	Bob Hope Presents the Chrysler Theatre	Dorothy Reynolds	Season 4 Episode 21: "Verdict for Terror"
1967	Bonanza	Estelle Dawson	Season 9 Episode 1: "Second Chance"
1968	Companions in Nightmare	Sara Nicholson	TV Movie
1968–1970	The F.B.I.	Annette Jurgens / Miss Kurland / Mary Binyon	3 episodes
1969	Mannix	Rita Claman	Season 2 Episode 15: "Only Giants Can Play"
1969–1973	Medical Center	Nurse Marsh	4 episodes
1969–1974	Ironside	Dr. Pat Manners / Sylvia Harris	2 episodes
1970	Bracken's World	Anne Frazer	13 episodes
1972	Columbo	Miss Sherman	Season 1 Episode 7: "Blueprint for Murder"
1972	The Sixth Sense	Helene	Season 1 Episode 6: "Can a Dead Man Strike from the Grave?"
1972	Heat of Anger	Stella Galvin	TV Movie
1972–1974	Return to Peyton Place	Constance MacKenzie #1	
1973	Gunsmoke	Zisha Gorofsky	Season 18 Episode 24: "This Golden Land"
1973–1975	The Rookies	Ellen Tabnor / Judge	2 episodes
1974	Murder or Mercy	Nurse Cantelli	TV Movie
1974	Mooch	Bettye Ackerman (uncredited)	TV Movie
1974	Lucas Tanner	Frances Shaw	2 episodes
1974–1976	Police Story	Martha Dunnhill / Katherine Moran	2 episodes
1974–1976	Barnaby Jones	Margery Kinner / Mrs. Nesbitt	2 episodes
1975	The Streets of San Francisco	Dr. Hamill	Season 3 Episode 21: "Asylum"
1975	Harry O	Laureen Lister	Season 2 Episode 6: "The Acolyte"
1975	Petrocelli	Ann Hendricks	Season 2 Episode 11: "Too Many Alibis"
1977	Never Con a Killer	Dorothy	TV Movie
1977	The Feather and Father Gang	Dorothy	Season 1 Episode 6: "Never Con a Killer"
1977	Wonder Woman	Asclepia	Season 2 Episode 1: "The Return of Wonder Woman"
1977	CHiPs	Mrs. Burgess	Season 1 Episode 2: "Undertow"
1977–1981	The Waltons	Belle Becker	2 episodes
1978	Doctors' Private Lives	Sylvia	TV Movie
1978	Police Woman	Helen Fletcher	Season 4 Episode 22: "Good Old Uncle Ben"
1979	240-Robert	Eileen Phillips	Season 1 Episode 2: "Stuntman"
1980	Trouble in High Timber Country	Mrs. Lomax	TV Movie
1981	Foul Play		Season 1 Episode 9: "The Terrible Tara O'Hara"
1982	Falcon Crest	Elizabeth Bradbury	Season 1 Episode 11: "For Love or Money"
1982	A Day for Thanks on Walton's Mountain	Belle Tucker	TV Movie
1982	Dynasty	Katherine	Season 3 Episode 4: "The Will"
1982–1984	Trapper John, M.D.	Mrs. Bayard / Dr. Michaels	2 episodes
1983	Confessions of a Married Man	Social Security Employee	TV Movie
1983	The Love Boat	Professor Helen Burton	Season 6 Episode 26: "The Professor Has Class/When the Magic Disappears/We, the Jury"
1984	Double Trouble	The Judge	Season 1 Episode 5: "Dueling Feet"
1985	Me and Mom		Season 1 Episode 1: "A Killing in the Market"
1985	Tales of the Unexpected	Ruby	Season 8 Episode 3: "Nothin' Short of Highway Robbery"
1986	St. Elsewhere	Mrs. Nova	Season 5 Episode 11: "Lost Weekend"
