= John Zaremba =

American actor (1908–1986)

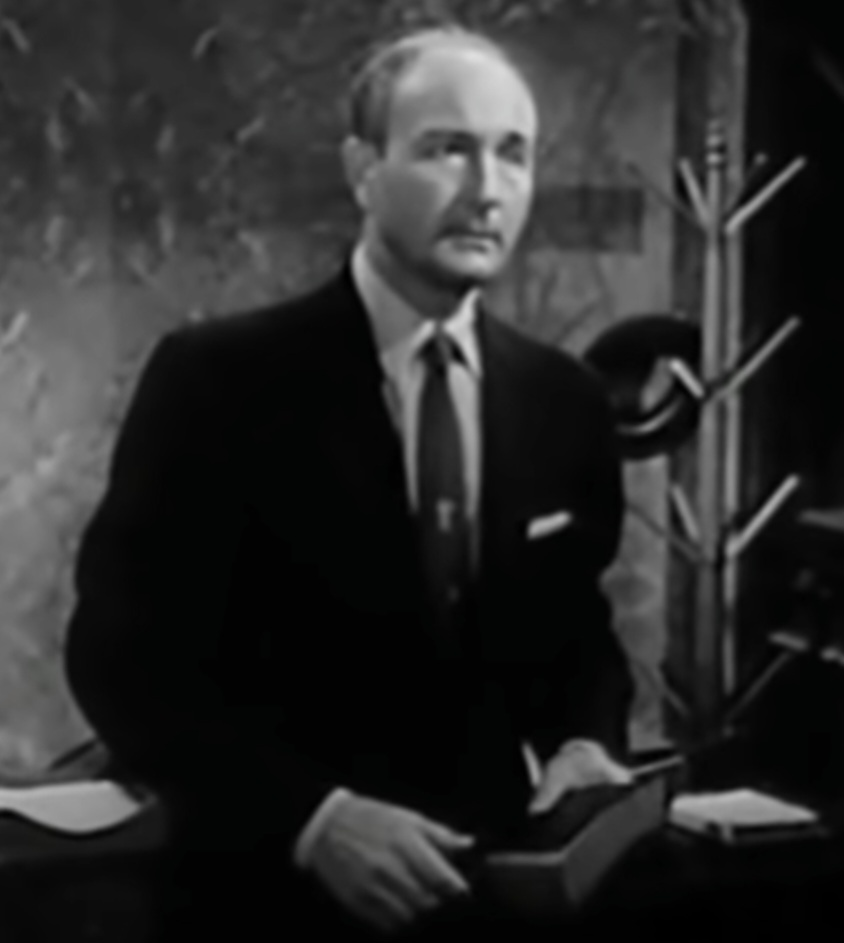
- Zaremba in an episode of One Step Beyond (1959)
- Born: October 22, 1908; Chicago, Illinois, U.S.
- Died: December 15, 1986 (aged 78); Newport Beach, California, U.S.
- Occupation: Actor
- Years active: 1950–1986
- Spouse: Eleanor Zaremba
- Children: 3

John Zaremba (October 22, 1908 – December 15, 1986) was an American actor most noted for supporting roles on science fiction films and television series.

== Biography ==
The Chicago-born Zaremba was a journalist for the Grand Rapids Press and Chicago Tribune newspapers until 1949, when he moved to Hollywood and became an actor. In 1962, he appeared as "Stone" on The Virginian in the episode, "It tolls for Thee". He appeared in seven episodes of Alfred Hitchcock Presents and four episodes of The Alfred Hitchcock Hour.

His regular roles included Dr. Harold Jansen in Ben Casey (1961–1966), Dr. Raymond Swain in The Time Tunnel (1966–1967), and a judge in Owen Marshall: Counselor at Law (1971–1974). While first appearing as a Captain Martin in a 1963 episode ("A Letter for Fuji") of McHale's Navy, he would make four more recurring appearances in subsequent episodes in 1964 and 1965, all as Admiral Hardesty.

Zaremba was the television spokesman for Hills Brothers Coffee in the 1970s and early 1980s, playing a fictional coffee bean buyer, traveling the world in search of the best quality coffee beans.

== Career ==
Zaremba appeared in 139 films and television shows.

Film

- Pirates of the High Seas (1950, Serial) - Dr. Schmidt [Chapter 10] (uncredited)
- Young Man with Ideas (1952) - Court Clerk (uncredited)
- The Magnetic Monster (1953) - Chief Watson
- Human Desire (1954) - 'Russ' Russell, Train Conductor (uncredited)
- Tight Spot (1955) - Second Policeman (uncredited)
- Cell 2455, Death Row (1955) - District Attorney (uncredited)
- 5 Against the House (1955) - Robert Fenton (uncredited)
- Chicago Syndicate (1955) - Detective Lieutenant Robert Fenton
- Apache Ambush (1955) - The President's Secretary (uncredited)
- Ransom! (1956) - Telephone Technician (uncredited)
- The Houston Story (1956) - Emile Constant
- Earth vs. the Flying Saucers (1956) - Professor Kanter
- He Laughed Last (1956) - Big Dan's Doctor (uncredited)
- The Power and the Prize (1956) - Fred Delehanty, Office Worker (uncredited)
- Reprisal! (1956) - Mr. Willard (uncredited)
- Hit and Run (1957) - Doctor
- The Night the World Exploded (1957) - Daniel J. Winters (Assistant Secretary of Defense) (uncredited)
- 20 Million Miles to Earth (1957) - Dr. Judson Uhl
- Zero Hour! (1957) - Passenger with Sick Wife (uncredited)
- The Power of the Resurrection (1958) - Samuel
- Young and Wild (1958) - Sergeant Larsen
- Juvenile Jungle (1958) - Mr. Murray (uncredited)
- The Case Against Brooklyn (1958) - Assistant District Attorney Heller (uncredited)
- The Saga of Hemp Brown (1958) - Military Prosecutor (uncredited)
- Tarawa Beachhead (1958) - Second Staff Officer Speaking (uncredited)
- Frankenstein's Daughter (1958) - Police Lieutenant Boyle
- Battle of the Coral Sea (1959) - Air Admiral (uncredited)
- Vice Raid (1960) - Sidney Marsh (uncredited)
- Because They're Young (1960) - Mr. Trent (uncredited)
- The Gallant Hours (1960) - Major General Millard F. Harmon (uncredited)
- Key Witness (1960) - Reporter (uncredited)
- The Lawbreakers (1961) - Sergeant John Ervine
- Moon Pilot (1962) - Security Officer Conducting Lineup (uncredited)
- Dangerous Charter (1962) - FBI Special Agent (shot in 1958)
- A Gathering of Eagles (1963) - Flight Surgeon (uncredited)
- Follow Me, Boys! (1966) - Ralph's Lawyer (uncredited)
- R. P. M. (1970) - President Tyler
- Scandalous John (1971) - Wales
- The War Between Men and Women (1972) - Minister
- Herbie Rides Again (1974) - Lawyer, First Team
- Brothers (1977) - Judge #2
- Return to Fantasy Island (1978) - Dr. Croyden

Television

- I Led Three Lives (1953–1956) (69 episodes) - Special Agent Jerry Dressler
- Dragnet (1955) (Season 4 Episode 37: "The Big Watch")
- Alfred Hitchcock Presents (1957–1962) (7 episodes)
  - (Season 3 Episode 3: "The Perfect Crime") (1957) - Photographer
  - (Season 4 Episode 25: "The Kind Waitress") (1959) - Dr. Maxwell
  - (Season 6 Episode 2: "The Doubtful Doctor") (1960) - Psychiatrist
  - (Season 7 Episode 2: "Bang, You're Dead") (1961) - Market Manager
  - (Season 7 Episode 22: "The Big Score") (1962) - Lieutenant Morgan
  - (Season 7 Episode 28: "The Kerry Blue") (1962) - Dr. Chaff
  - (Season 7 Episode 31: "Most Likely to Succeed") (1962) - Tax Investigator
- Zorro (1959) (Season 2 Episode 20: "Spark of Revenge") - Magistrado
- Alcoa Presents: One Step Beyond (1959) (Season 2 Episode 15: "Earthquake") (broadcast US, 12 December) - Clerk of the Court
- Sea Hunt (1959–1961) (6 episodes)
  - (Season 2 Episode 28: "Underwater Ejection") (1959) - Dr. Bartock
  - (Season 2 Episode 30: "Port Security") (1959) - Charlie Keller
  - (Season 3 Episode 1: "Asylum") (1960) - Lee Bellum
  - (Season 3 Episode 18: "Cindy") (1960) - Police Chief Coleman
  - (Season 3 Episode 39: "Man Overboard") (1960) - George Emerson
  - (Season 4 Episode 23: "Baby") (1961) - Dr. Bruney
- Maverick (1960) (Season 3 Episode 21: "The People's Friend") - Gantry
- Dennis the Menace (1961) (Season 2 Episode 16: "Miss Cathcart's Friend") - Arthur Prilych
- Disneyland (1961) - Reverend Graves
- Ben Casey (1961–1965) (15 episodes) - Dr. Harold Jensen
- The Alfred Hitchcock Hour (1962–1963) (4 episodes)
  - (Season 1 Episode 4: "I Saw the Whole Thing") (1962) - Richard Anderson
  - (Season 1 Episode 6: "Final Vow") (1962) - Mr. Meecham
  - (Season 1 Episode 29: "The Dark Pool") (1963) - Coroner
  - (Season 2 Episode 7: "Starring the Defense") (1963) - Judge
- Perry Mason (1962–1964) (5 episodes)
  - (Season 5 Episode 16: "The Case of the Shapely Shadow") (1962) - Autopsy Surgeon
  - (Season 5 Episode 30: "The Case of the Lonely Eloper") (1962) - Doctor Wales
  - (Season 6 Episode 23: "The Case of the Lover's Leap") (1963) - Medical Examiner
  - (Season 7 Episode 15: "The Case of the Capering Camera") (1964) - Coroner's Physician
  - (Season 7 Episode 17: "The Case of the Bountiful Beauty") (1964) - Medical Examiner
- The Virginian (1962–1967) (5 episodes)
  - (Season 1 Episode 9: "It Tolls for Thee") (1962) - Stone
  - (Season 2 Episode 13: "Siege") (1963) - Undertaker
  - (Season 3 Episode 8: "A Father for Toby") (1964) - Warden
  - (Season 5 Episode 15: "Vengeance Trail") (1967) - Polk
  - (Season 6 Episode 11: "To Bear Witness") (1967) - Mayor
- The Twilight Zone (1963) (Season 4 Episode 10: "No Time Like the Past") - Horn Player
- Burke's Law (1963) (Season 1 Episode 1: "Who Killed Holly Howard?") - Lieutenant Charlie Johnson (uncredited)
- McHale's Navy (1963–1965) (5 episodes)
  - (Season 2 Episode 13: "A Letter for Fuji") (1963) - Captain Martin
  - (Season 2 Episode 34: "Marryin' Chuck") (1964) - Admiral Edgar Hardesy
  - (Season 3 Episode 21: "All Chiefs and No Indians") (1965) - Admiral Edgar Hardesy
  - (Season 3 Episode 27: "Chuckie Cottontail") (1965) - Admiral Edgar Hardesy
  - (Season 3 Episode 32: "All Ahead, Empty") (1965) - Admiral Edgar Hardesy
- Lassie (1963–1970) (4 episodes)
  - (Season 9 Episode 29: "Weasel Warfare") (1963) - Dr. Temple
  - (Season 10 Episode 13: "Day of Darkness") (1963) - Ralph Henderson
  - (Season 11 Episode 18: "Lassie and the Girl in the Canyon") (1965) - Dr. Walker
  - (Season 16 Episode 14: "The Road Back: Part 1") (1970) - Dr. Kendall
- The Fugitive (1964) (Season 1 Episode 25: "Taps for a Dead War") - Druggist
- Voyage to the Bottom of the Sea (1964–1965) (2 episodes)
  - (Season 1 Episode 1: "Eleven Days to Zero") (1964) - Dr. Claude Selby
  - (Season 2 Episode 2: "Time Bomb") (1965) - Admiral Johnson
- 12 O'Clock High (1964–1966) (5 episodes)
  - (Season 1 Episode 8: "The Hours Before Dawn") (1964) - General Homer Stoneman
  - (Season 1 Episode 26: "Mutiny at Ten Thousand Feet") (1965) - General Homer Stoneman
  - (Season 1 Episode 28: "The Cry of Fallen Birds") (1965) - General Homer Stoneman
  - (Season 1 Episode 32: "The Hero") (1965) - General Homer Stoneman
  - (Season 3 Episode 2: "Massacre") (1966) - Lieutenant General Owen
- Peyton Place (1965) (3 episodes) - Dr. Kessler
  - (Season 1 Episode 37) (uncredited)
  - (Season 1 Episode 38) (uncredited)
  - (Season 1 Episode 47) (uncredited)
- The Munsters (1965) (Season 2 Episode 2: "Herman, the Master Spy") - Charlie
- The F.B.I. (1965–1972) (4 episodes)
  - (Season 1 Episode 9: "The Exiles") (1965) - Colonel Novin
  - (Season 3 Episode 10: "Blueprint for Betrayal") (1967) - Hackett
  - (Season 5 Episode 8: "The Challenge") (1969) - Winston Keller
  - (Season 8 Episode 11: "Canyon of No Return") (1972) - Hotel Guest
- Batman (1966) (2 episodes) - Kolevater
  - (Season 1 Episode 7: "Instant Freeze")
  - (Season 1 Episode 8: "Rats Like Cheese") (uncredited)
- Daniel Boone (1966) (Season 3 Episode 14: "When a King Is a Pawn") - Chaumet
- The Time Tunnel (1966–1967) (30 episodes) - Dr. Raymond Swain
- The Invaders (1967) (2 episodes)
  - (Season 2 Episode 3: "The Watchers") (1967) - General
  - (Season 2 Episode 12: "Labyrinth") (1967) - Professor Ed Harrison
- Ironside (1967–1971) (4 episodes)
  - (Season 1 Episode 13: "The Past Is Prologue") (1967) - Dr. Michaels
  - (Season 2 Episode 26: "Not with a Whimper, But a Bang") (1969) - Dean Morris
  - (Season 3 Episode 2: "Goodbye for Yesterday") (1969) - Doctor
  - (Season 5 Episode 5: "Ring of Prayer") (1971) - Dr. Ward
- The Wild Wild West (1968) (Season 3 Episode 21: "The Night of the Undead") - Dr. Paul Eddington
- Mission: Impossible (1968) (Season 3 Episode 11: "The Freeze") - Dr. Jacob Bowman
- Lancer (1968–1969) (2 episodes)
  - (Season 1 Episode 12: "The Escape") (1968) - Hotel Clerk
  - (Season 1 Episode 13: "The Wedding") (1969)
- Bonanza (1968–1972) (4 episodes)
  - (Season 9 Episode 17: "The Thirteenth Man") (1968) - Charles
  - (Season 11 Episode 3: "The Silence at Stillwater") (1969) - Dr. Menring
  - (Season 14 Episode 3: "The Initiation") (1972) - Judge
  - (Season 14 Episode 11: "The Bucket Dog") (1972) - Judge Wilcox
- The High Chaparral (1969) (Season 3 Episode 4: "A Piece of Land") - Price
- Land of the Giants (1969) (Season 2 Episode 4: "Deadly Pawn") - Dr. Lalor
- Get Smart (1970) (Season 5 Episode 22: "Smartacus") - Senator Brookside
- All in the Family (1972) (Season 3 Episode 11: "Mike's Appendix") - Anesthetist
- Cannon (1972–1975) (3 episodes)
  - (Season 1 Episode 18: "The Kill a Guinea Pig") (1972) - Theodore Croft
  - (Season 2 Episode 23: "Press Pass to the Slammer") (1973) - Judge Holcomb
  - (Season 5 Episode 2: "The Deadly Conspiracy: Part 1") (1975) - Arthur Allen Royce
- Columbo (1974) (Season 3 Episode 6: "Mind Over Mayhem") - Coroner
- The Streets of San Francisco (1974–1976) (3 episodes)
  - (Season 3 Episode 4: "Mask of Death") (1974) - Dr. Thompson
  - (Season 4 Episode 16: "The Honorable Profession") (1976) - Mr. Schultz
  - (Season 5 Episode 3: "Dead or Alive") (1976) - Mr. Zabrockie
- Barnaby Jones (1974–1980) (2 episodes)
  - (Season 2 Episode 23: "Image in a Cracked Mirror") (1974) - Mr. Stevenson
  - (Season 8 Episode 21: "Deadline for Murder") (1980) - Ralph Luxor
- S.W.A.T. (1975) (Season 1 Episode 5: "Hit Men") - Howard Redding
- Charlie's Angels (1976–1980) (2 episodes)
  - (Season 1 Episode 7: "The Kill an Angel") (1976) - Dr. Stafford
  - (Season 4 Episode 14: "Angel's Child") (1980) - Judge Towers
- Dallas (1978–1986) (13 episodes) - Dr. Harlen Danvers (1986-final appearance)
- Little House on the Prairie (1979–1981) (4 episodes) - Judge Adams
  - (Season 6 Episode 3: "The Family Tree") (1979)
  - (Season 6 Episode 18: "May We Make Them Proud: Part I") (1980)
  - (Season 6 Episode 19: "May We Make Them Proud: Part II") (1980)
  - (Season 7 Episode 19: "Blind Justice") (1981)
