= Nick Dennis =

Greek-American film actor (1904–1980)

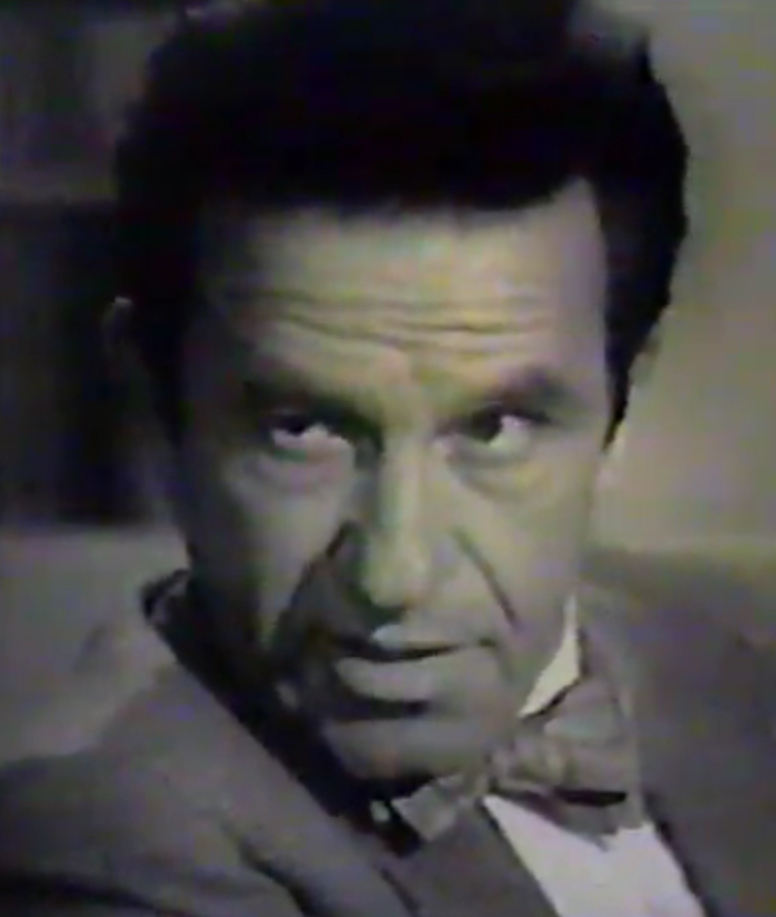
- Dennis in an episode of Lock-Up (1960)
- Born: Nicolas Caravidas; April 26, 1904; Thessaly, Greece
- Died: November 14, 1980 (aged 76); Los Angeles, California, U.S.
- Education: University of Illinois
- Occupation: Actor
- Years active: 1947-1978
- Spouse(s): Helen Stratas (m. 1946)
- Children: 2

Nicholas Canavaras (born Nicolas Caravidas; April 26, 1904 – November 14, 1980), known professionally as Nick Dennis, was a Greek American film actor born in Thessaly, Greece.

== Early life and career ==
Following his arrival in the U.S. in 1914, Dennis attended public schools in Lowell, Massachusetts. After his father's death, he went to live with his sister in Independence, Missouri, where—as Nick Canavaras—he was a student at William Chrisman High School, and where, as a waiter in his brother-in-law's restaurant, he reportedly had many opportunities to serve the future POTUS (then a county judge), Harry S. Truman. Dennis later spent two years at the University of Illinois.

Dennis, who began in films in 1947, was known for playing ethnic types (usually Greek) in films such as Kiss Me Deadly and the Humphrey Bogart film Sirocco. Dennis, who spoke Greek fluently, appeared in a number of television programs in the 1950s, 1960s, and 1970s including playing the parts of orderly Nick Kanavaras on the medical drama Ben Casey and Uncle Constantine on the detective show Kojak.

Nick Dennis also played the role of Pablo Gonzales in Tennessee Williams' play A Streetcar Named Desire, as well as its subsequent film version in 1951.

== Personal life and death ==
In 1946, Dennis—as Nicolas Canavaras—married Helen Stratas in Toronto, Ontario. After raising two daughters, the couple divorced in 1967, remarried in 1970, and divorced again in 1972. Although records of any subsequent remarriage are not readily apparent, both a 1977 Dennis profile/interview—stating that one of the daughters "lives with Dennis and his wife Hellen"—and the more thorough of his 1980 obituaries would make it appear that a full reconciliation was reached, de facto if not de jure.

On November 14, 1980, having spent the previous six years battling myasthenia gravis and cancer, Dennis died at Sepulveda Veterans Administration Hospital in Los Angeles, survived by his daughters and by "Helen Dennis, his wife of 34 years."

== Filmography ==
Year	Title	Role	Notes
1947	A Double Life	Stagehand	Uncredited
1951	Sirocco	Nasir Aboud	
1951	A Streetcar Named Desire	Pablo	
1951	Ten Tall Men	Mouse	
1952	Anything Can Happen	Chancho	
1952	The Iron Mistress	Nez Coupe	
1952	Eight Iron Men	Pvt. Sapiros	
1953	Man in the Dark	Cookie	
1953	The Glory Brigade	Cpl. Marakis	
1955	East of Eden	Rantani	
1955	Top of the World	Master Sgt. Cappi	
1955	Kiss Me Deadly	Nick Va Va Voom	
1955	The Big Knife	Mickey Feeney	
1956	Hot Blood	Korka	Uncredited
1957	Slaughter on Tenth Avenue	Midget Dock Worker	
1959	Alaska Passage	Pete Harris	
1960	Spartacus	Dionysius	
1961	Too Late Blues	Nick Bubalinas	
1962	Birdman of Alcatraz	Crazed Prisoner	Uncredited
1963	4 for Texas	Angel	
1966	Gunpoint	Nicos	
1968	The Legend of Lylah Clare	Nick	
1969	The Good Guys and the Bad Guys	Engineer #2	
