= Andrew J. Fenady =

American actor (1928–2020)

- Born: October 4, 1928; Toledo, Ohio, U.S.
- Died: April 16, 2020 (aged 91); Los Angeles, California, U.S.
- Occupations: Actor; screenwriter; producer; novelist

Andrew J. Fenady (October 4, 1928 – April 16, 2020) was an American actor, screenwriter, producer, and novelist.

== Early years ==
Fenady was born in Ohio, of Greek descent. His involvement in drama began while he was a student at Woodward High School in Toledo, Ohio. He directed produced, wrote, and starred in local radio programs while he was a student at the University of Toledo, from which he graduated in 1950 with degrees in economics and literature.

== Career ==
Fenady's early professional experience was as an actor in summer stock theater in the eastern United States. He also toured as a Shakesperean actor with the National Classic Theatre.

In 1951, Fenady turned to cinema and theatre and moved to Hollywood. He began as an actor on the television series Confidential File, produced by Paul Coates, and then became "an all-around operative" for Coates. He and director Irvin Kershner amassed approximately $30,000 to make the 1958 film Stakeout on Dope Street, before following it up with The Young Captives. Fenady and Kershner soon thereafter began a longtime partnership in the cinema. In 1957, Warner Bros. signed the pair to a long-term contract.

Fenady wrote the series The Rebel alongside the actor Nick Adams, while Kershner directed the show's 76 episodes. He then wrote the script for the Western Ride Beyond Vengeance and produced the television series Branded.

In 1967, Fenady worked on a new television series, Hondo, based on the movie Hondo. The project turned into a TV movie, and brought Fenady to write Chisum in the 1970s, directed by Andrew V. McLaglen and starring John Wayne.

During his career, Fenady also acted on occasion. He played Philip Sheridan in the TV series The Rebel. He received a Golden Boot Award in 1995.

== Death ==
Fenady died on April 16, 2020, in Los Angeles, California, at the age of 91.

== Filmography ==
=== Screenwriter ===
==== Cinema ====
- Stakeout on Dope Street (1958)
- The Young Captives (1959)
- Ride Beyond Vengeance (1966)
- Chisum (1970)
- Terror in the Wax Museum (1973)
- Arnold (1973)
- The Man with Bogart's Face (1980)

==== Telefilms ====
- Las Vegas Beat (1961)
- Postmark: Jim Fletcher (1963)
- Hondo (1967)
- Black Noon (1971)
- The Hanged Man (1974)
- Mayday at 40,000 feet! (1976)
- The Hostage Heart (1977)
- The Mask of Alexander Cross (1977)
- A Masterpiece of Murder (1986)
- Jake Spanner, Private Eye (1989)
- Yes, Virginia, there is a Santa Claus (1991)
- The Sea Wolf (1993)

==== TV series ====
- Confidential File (1955–1958)
- The Rebel (1959–1961)
- Branded (1965–1966)
- Hondo (1967)

=== Producer ===
==== Cinema ====
- Stakeout on Dope Street (1958)
- The Young Captives (1959)
- Broken Sabre (1965)
- Ride Beyond Vengeance (1966)
- Chisum (1970)
- Terror in the Wax Museum (1973)
- Arnold (1973)
- The Man with Bogart's Face (1980)

==== Telefilms ====
- Las Vegas Beat (1961)
- Hondo (1967)
- Black Noon (1971)
- The Woman Hunter (1972)
- The Voyage of the Yes (1973)
- The Stranger (1973)
- Sky Heist (1973)
- The Hanged Man (1974)
- Mayday at 40,000 Feet! (1976)
- The Hostage Heart (1977)
- The Mask of Alexander Cross (1977)
- Who Is Julia? (1986)
- Jake Spanner, Private Eye (1989)
- The Love She Sought (1990)
- Yes, Virginia, there is a Santa Claus (1991)
- The Sea Wolf (1993)

==== TV series ====
- The Rebel (1959–1961)
- Branded (1965–1966)
- Hondo (1967)

=== Actor ===
==== Cinema ====
- Stakeout on Dope Street (1958)

==== Telefilms and TV series ====
- The Rebel (1960)
- Las Vegas Beat (1961)
- Branded (1965–1966)
- The Love She Sought (1990)
- The Sea Wolf (1993)

== Literary works ==
=== Novels ===
- The Man with Bogart's Face (1977)
- The Secret of Sam Marlow (1980)
- Claws of the Eagle: A Novel of Tom Horn And the Apache Kid (1984)
- The Summer of Jack London (1985)
- Mulligan (1989)
- Runaways (1994)
- There Came a Stranger (2001)
- The Rebel Johnny Yuma (2002)
- Double Eagles (2002)
- A Night in Beverly Hills (2003)
- Riders to Moon Rock (2005)
- A Night in Hollywood Forever (2006)
- Big Ike (2007)
- The Trespassers (2008)
- Tom Horn and the Apache Kid (2009)
- The Range Wolf (2012)
- Destiny Made Them Brothers (2013)
- Black Noon (2015)

=== Plays ===
- The Man with Bogart's Face: A Play in Two Acts (2000)

== Awards ==
- Golden Boot Award (1995)
