= Massimo Giuliani =

Italian film, television, and voice actor

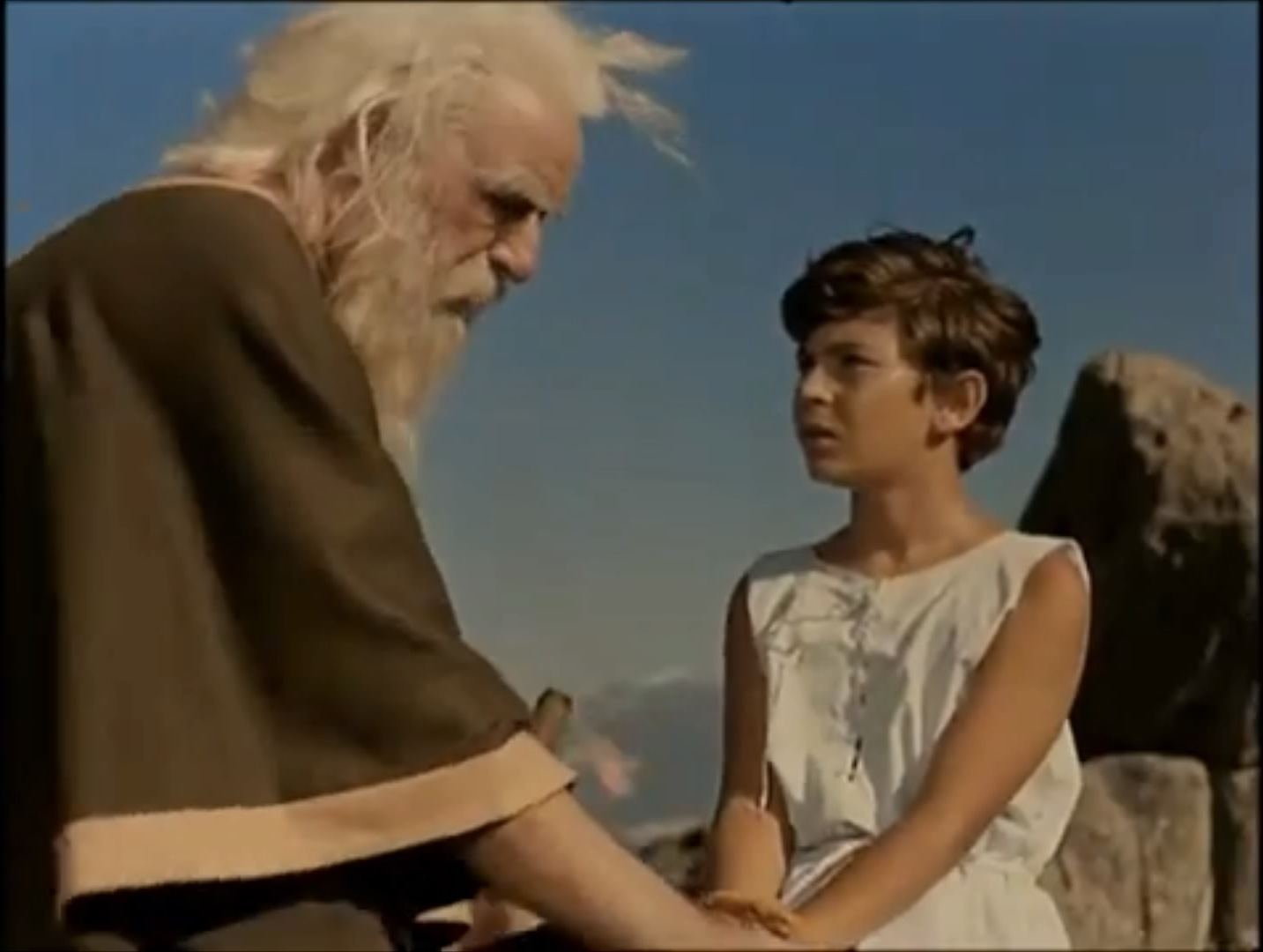
- Giulani (right) in I patriarchi (1964)
- Born: 5 February 1951 (age 75); Rome, Italy
- Occupations: Actor; voice actor; impressionist; host; dubbing director; adapter
- Years active: 1955–present
- Spouse: Tiziana Lattuca
- Children: Daniele Giuliani
- Relatives: Claudia Catani (niece)

Massimo Giuliani (born 5 February 1951) is an Italian actor, voice actor and impressionist.

== Biography ==
Born in Rome, he began his career at four years of age with the 1956 film Supreme Confession. He had an intensifying experience as a child actor throughout the 1950s and 1960s on cinema and television and also voiced Arthur in the Italian-Language dub of the 1963 animated Disney film The Sword in the Stone, which marked Giuliani's first dubbing contribution. In that same year he performed the role of Paolo in Irvin Kershner's war film Face in the Rain.

A passionate football fan and pratictioner, in the 1960s he was hired to play in the roman football youth squad, but had to leave after four months due to his obligations as a child actor.

Giuliani went on acting in films and television, also taking part in plays, variety shows, and hosting programs for the Italian television and radio industry. A later, popular acting role of his was that of Ciro, the newsagent, in the late '80s TV series I ragazzi della 3ª C.

As a voice actor, Giuliani became well known for providing the Italian voice of John Belushi in The Blues Brothers, as well as Bugs Bunny (from 1996 to 2006, when the role was passed on to Davide Garbolino), Fozzie Bear in The Muppets and Buck from the Ice Age film series. Giuliani has also dubbed Mel Gibson, Dudley Moore, Billy Crystal, John Candy, Andy García, Joe Pantoliano and Warwick Davis in some of their projects.

In the early 2000s, Giuliani protested that he had been insulted and threatened by AS Roma supporters due to his impersonation of footballer Francesco Totti on the TV show Convenscion, where he had also imitated other public figures such as sportspeople and politicians.

He has also made appearances in La Partita del cuore.

=== Personal life ===
Giuliani is married to dubbing director Tiziana Lattuca. He is also the father of voice actor Daniele Giuliani and the uncle of voice actress Claudia Catani.

== Filmography ==
=== Cinema ===
- Supreme Confession (1956) - Lisa and Marco's son
- Vento di primavera (1959) - Dino, the tenor's son
- Arena of Fear (1959) - Willi, Dody's Sohn
- Big Request Concert (1960) - Francesco
- I Am Semiramis (1962) - Adarte
- I terribili 7 (1963) - Davy Crockett
- Liolà (1963) - Liolà's son
- Giacobbe, l'uomo che lottò con Dio (1963) - Young Isaac
- A Face in the Rain (1963) - Paolo
- I patriarchi (1964) - Young Isaac
- Corpse for the Lady (1964) - Witness
- Seasons of Our Love (1965) - Leonardo Varzi as a kid
- The Sunday Woman (1975) - music store client
- The Face with Two Left Feet (1979) - Mario
- I Don't Understand You Anymore (1980) - Gino
- The Children Thief (1991) - 2nd Argentinian
- L'ultimo innocente (1992)
- Ci hai rotto papà (1993) - Pietro "Mano di legno" Inghileri

=== Television ===
- Il romanzo di un maestro (1959)
- Le avventure della squadra di stoppa (1964)
- Avventure in IV B (1964)
- David Copperfield (1965)
- Diario partigiano (1970)
- Processo ad un atto di valore (1972)
- I ragazzi della 3ª C (1987-1989) - Ciro
- Classe di ferro (1989) - "Macho" Carrera
- ...Se non avessi l'amore (1991)
- Pazza famiglia (1995) - Marcello
- S.P.Q.R. (1998) - Commissioner Calì
- Anni '60 (1999) - Pino, the paparazzo
- Don Matteo - TV series, 1 episode (2004) - Alfredo Galanti
- Carabinieri - Sotto copertura - TV series (2005) - Massimo Giacchini
- Imperium: Pompeii - TV miniseries (2007) - Vetutius

== Voice work ==
- Computer voice in I carabbinieri
- Commentator in Italia '90 - Notti magiche

=== Dubbing roles ===
==== Animation ====
- Arthur in The Sword in the Stone
- Young Thumper in Bambi (1968 redub)
- Wally and Elvis in Butch Cassidy and the Sundance Kids
- Koji Kabuto and Mucha in Great Mazinger
- Jack-o'-lantern, Jacques, Pindar and a dwarf in Festival of Family Classics
- Fozzie Bear in The Muppet Movie, The Great Muppet Caper, The Muppet Christmas Carol (Fozziwig) / Swedish Chef, Muppet Treasure Island (Squire Trelawney), Muppets From Space, It's a Very Merry Muppet Christmas Movie, The Muppets' Wizard of Oz (Cowardly Lion), The Muppets, Muppets Most Wanted, Muppet Babies
- Jimbo Jones (season 5), Professor John Frink (episode 5.4) and James Taylor (episode 5.15) in The Simpsons
- Bugs Bunny in Animaniacs, Looney Tunes and Merrie Melodies (1995-2006), Space Jam, The Bugs Bunny/Road Runner Movie (1999 redub), Tweety's High-Flying Adventure, Looney Tunes: Back in Action, Bah, Humduck! A Looney Tunes Christmas
- The Godpigeon, Mindy's father, Charlton Woodchuck/Baynarts, Katie's father, Mel Gibson, Baloney (episode 3.4) and Christopher Walken in Animaniacs
- Barnyard Dawg, voiceovers and other characters in Looney Tunes and Merrie Melodies (1995-2006)
- Additional voices in Tweety's High Flying Adventure
- Buck in Ice Age: Dawn of the Dinosaurs, Ice Age: Collision Course, The Ice Age Adventures of Buck Wild
- Dusty Rust-eze in Cars 3

==== Live action ====
- Whitney and TV journalist in Piranha
- Jake "Joilet" Blues in The Blues Brothers
- Frank Dunne in Gallipoli
- Guy Hamilton in The Year of Living Dangerously
- Fletcher Christian in The Bounty
- Tom Garvey in The River
- Ed Biddle in Mrs. Soffel
- Max Rockatansky in Mad Max Beyond Thunderdome
- Barf in Spaceballs
- George Stone / Giuseppe Petri in The Untouchables
- Ben Chase in Criminal Law
- Rick Becker in Loaded Weapon 1
- Nikanor "Nick" Chevotarevich in The Deer Hunter
- Arthur Bach in Arthur, Arthur 2: On the Rocks
- Francis Fratelli in The Goonies
- Larry Donner in Throw Momma from the Train
- The Leprechaun in Leprechaun
- Rob Salinger in Micki & Maude
- Jack Hammond in Like Father Like Son
- Melvyn Orton in Blame It on the Bellboy
- Angel Maldonado in 8 Million Ways to Die
- Norbert "Norby" LeBlaw in Baby's Day Out
- Eddie Moscone in Midnight Run
- Ramirez in Stand and Deliver
- Nick "Goose" Bradshaw in Top Gun
- Gray Baker in Dead Again
- Ernie Souchak in Continental Divide
- Danny Costanzo in Running Scared

=== Video games ===
- Bugs Bunny in Bugs Bunny: Lost in Time, Bugs Bunny & Taz: Time Busters, Looney Tunes: Back in Action
