= William Bryant (actor) =

American actor (1924-2001)

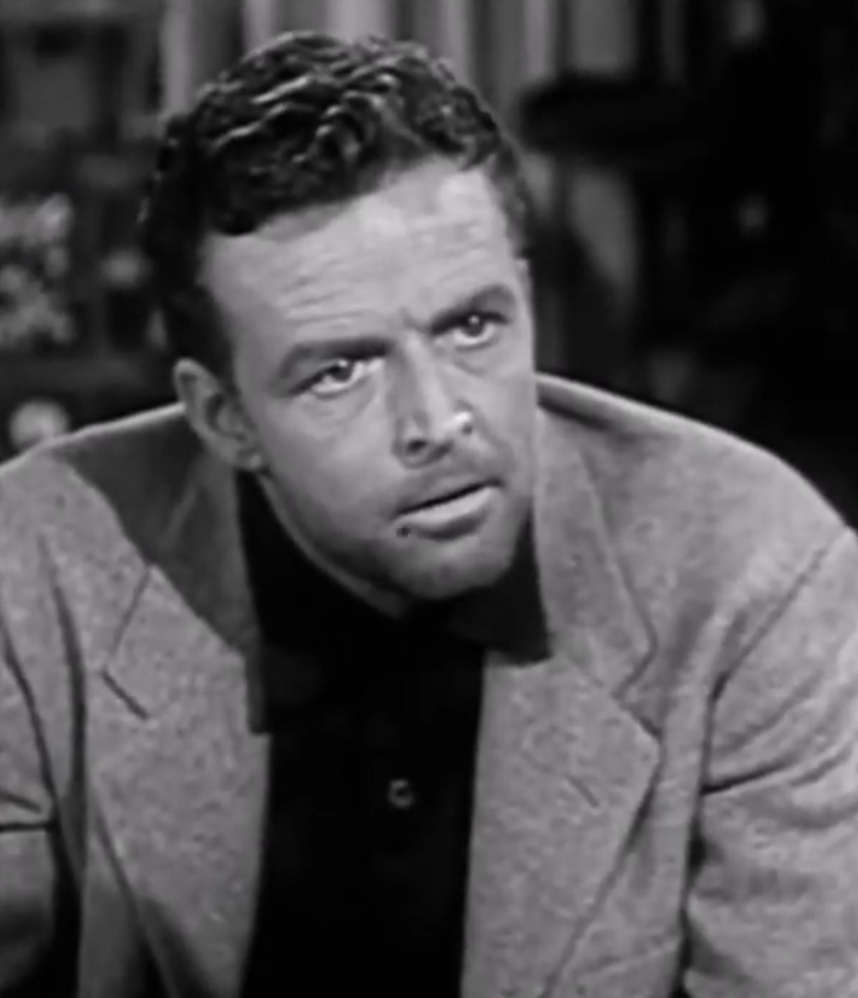
- Bryant in an episode of Lock-Up (1959)
- Born: January 31, 1924; Detroit, Michigan, U.S.
- Died: June 26, 2001 (aged 77); Los Angeles, California, U.S.
- Occupation: Actor
- Years active: 1950–1995

William Bryant (born William Robert Klein; January 31, 1924 – June 26, 2001) was an American actor.

== Film ==
Born in Detroit, Bryant was a character actor who appeared in films such as King Dinosaur (1955), Escape from San Quentin (1957), Experiment in Terror (1962) with Glenn Ford, How to Murder Your Wife and The Great Race with Jack Lemmon, What Did You Do in the War, Daddy? (1966), McQ (1974), and Walking Tall Part II (1975).

He also played several roles in the classic western movies Heaven with a Gun (1969), Chisum (1970), Macho Callahan (1970), Wild Rovers (1971), The Deadly Trackers (1973).

== Television ==
Most of his career was made on television, including Hallmark Hall of Fame, Frontier, Casey Jones, Tales of the Texas Rangers, The Gray Ghost, Maverick, The Rebel, Have Gun – Will Travel, The Rifleman (S5 E7 "The Assailants"), Laramie, The Virginian, Rawhide, Lancer, Miami Undercover, The Blue Angels, Ripcord, Combat!, Empire, Mission: Impossible, Mannix, Gunsmoke (S2E25 - “Bureaucrat”, S4E37 - “The Constable” & S12E12 - “Quaker Girl”), Bonanza, The Man from U.N.C.L.E., The Wild Wild West, Death Valley Days, Alias Smith and Jones, Banacek, McCloud, Columbo, Petrocelli, Cannon, The Rockford Files, Barnaby Jones, Code R, The Fall Guy, Shazam!, Hardcastle and McCormick, Simon & Simon, Airwolf, Murder, She Wrote, and many others.

He played Colonel Crook in sixteen episodes of the TV series Hondo, was on Emergency! (1972–1978) as different engine company captains, Branded (1965) as General Ulysses S. Grant, and in Lancer (1968) as Sheriff Gabe.

== Filmography ==
Film
Year	Title	Role	Notes
1949	Twelve O'Clock High	Radio operator	Uncredited
1953	The 49th Man	FBI Agent in Montage	as William R. Klein
1953	Sky Commando	Lt. John 'Johnny' Willard	as William R. Klein
1954	Battle of Rogue River	Corporal	as Bill Bryant
1955	A Bullet for Joey	Jack Allen	as Bill Bryant
1955	King Dinosaur	Dr. Ralph Martin	as Bill Bryant
1957	Escape from San Quentin	Richie	
1957	Jet Pilot	Radar Monitor	Uncredited (filmed in 1949, but, not released until 1957)
1962	Gunsmoke (TV Series)	Joe	”False Front” (S8E15)
1962	Experiment in Terror	Chuck	
1962/1967	Combat! (TV series)	Maj O'Connors, Larkin, Maynard, McCall	9 episodes (6 as McCall)
1965	How to Murder Your Wife	Construction Worker	
1965	Branded (TV series)	General\President Ulysses S. Grant	8 episodes
1965	The Great Race	Baron's Guard	
1966	Ride Beyond Vengeance	Bartender	
1966	What Did You Do in the War, Daddy?	Minow	
1967	Hondo	Col. Crook	16 episodes
1968/1969	Lancer	Sheriff Gabe	
1969	Smith!	Corporal/Court Bailiff (uncredited)	
1969	Heaven with a Gun	Bart Paterson (cattleman)	
1970	The Animals	Sheriff Martin Lord	
1970	Chisum	Jeff (Head Wrangler)	
1970	Macho Callahan	Dealer	
1971	Wild Rovers	Hereford	
1971	The Resurrection of Zachary Wheeler	Craig Harmon	
1972	Conquest of the Planet of the Apes	Man at Auction (uncredited)	
1972	Banacek	Burns	episode: A Million the Hard Way
1973	The Deadly Trackers	Deputy Bill	
1974	McMillan & Wife	Father Regan	episode: The Man Without a Face
1974	McQ	Sgt. Stan Boyle	
1975	Walking Tall Part II	F.B.I. Man	
1975	The Other Side of the Mountain	Bill Kinmont	
1976	The Macahans (TV film)	Major at Shiloh	
1976	Gable and Lombard	Colonel	
1976	Walt Disney's Wonderful World of Color	Mr. Hanson	episodes: The Flight of the Grey Wolf: Parts 1 & 2
1976	Shazam!	Harry Miller	episode: Ripcord
1976	Mayday at 40,000 Feet! (TV film)	Kent	
1976	Two-Minute Warning	Lt. Calloway	
1972/1978	Emergency! (TV series)	Engine Captains	
1978	Switch (TV series)	Lt. Shilton	
1978	The Other Side of the Mountain Part 2	Bill Kinmont	
1978	Corvette Summer	Plain Clothes Police Lecturer	
1978	Battlestar Galactica	Fire Leader	
1978	Mountain Family Robinson	Forest Ranger	
1979	The Legend of the Golden Gun (TV film)	William Ford	
1979	The Billion Dollar Threat (TV film)	Harry Grebe	
1982/1984	The Fall Guy (TV series)	The Director	
1986	The Education of Allison Tate	Chauffeur	
1986	Hell Squad	Nightclub owner	
1987	Amazon Women on the Moon	Male Republican	as Bill Bryant
