= Dale Olson =

American writer and publicist

- Born: February 20, 1934; Fargo, North Dakota, United States
- Died: August 9, 2012 (aged 78); Burbank, California, United States
- Spouse: Eugene Harbin (m. 2008)

Dale C. Olson (February 20, 1934 – August 9, 2012) was an American writer and publicist who represented prominent actors and film directors during his career, and an early gay rights activist.

In 1954, he became the first man to appear on television in the United States and self-identify as homosexual, albeit using a pseudonym with his face obscured. He served on the public relations coordinating and executive committee for the Academy of Motion Picture Arts and Sciences for twenty years, including three years as the committee's chairman. Beginning in the 1970s he spearheaded and launched film publicity campaigns.

== Early life and family ==
Dale Olson was born near Fargo, North Dakota to a young unmarried couple. His biological father was a lineman for a telephone company who had gotten into an accident and died. At around the age of three, his biological family put him up for adoption since they were unable to raise another child. A couple named Arthur Edwin Olson and Edith Weigt were not able to have children of their own, so they welcomed Dale Olson into their family.

The biological and adoptive families of Dale Olson were both Lutheran. Dale Olson's adoptive paternal grandfather, Charles Olson, was born in Sweden. Dale Olson's adoptive maternal grandparents, Samuel Weigt and Johanna Taron, were ethnic Germans from Russia.

== Biography ==
Olson spent much of his childhood in North Dakota, but eventually moved to Portland, Oregon with his family since they were no longer able to keep their farm. He landed a job as a newspaper reporter. One of his earliest interviews was with actress Mae West.

Olson moved to Los Angeles, California in 1951 and became the first national secretary for the Mattachine Society, one of the first organizations of homosexual men. In 1954, using the pseudonym Curtis White and with his face blurred, he appeared on Confidential File, a local "tabloid"-style television program hosted by Paul Coates, in an episode titled “Homosexuals and the Problems They Present”. In a segment called “The Sex Variant in Southern California”, "Curtis White" acknowledged that he was homosexual and stated that he "didn't consider himself abnormal" and would not want to be "cured". Despite the measures to obscure his identity, he was recognized by his boss when it aired and fired the next day, as he had predicted in the program. When questioned about why he would run that risk, he stated, "I think that this way I can be a little useful to someone besides myself." This has been cited as the first television appearance of an openly gay man.

He worked as a reporter and writer for The Hollywood Reporter and Variety during his early career. Olson co-founded the Los Angeles Drama Critics Circle as a staff member at Variety. In the 1960s, Olson joined the staff of Rogers & Cowan, a Los Angeles public relations firm, where he remained for eighteen years. He eventually became the head of Rogers & Cowan's film division.

Olson left the company in 1985 to open his own publicity company. He became the spokesperson for Rock Hudson in 1985 during the actor's battle with AIDS. Olson persuaded Hudson to publicly acknowledge that he had the disease, becoming one of the first celebrities to do so.

Olson represented numerous Hollywood legends throughout his career, such as Marilyn Monroe, Gene Kelly, Alfred Hitchcock, Clint Eastwood, Shirley MacLaine, and Steven Spielberg.

In addition to representing actors and other figures, Olson also worked on the campaigns for major Hollywood films. He launched the publicity campaigns for several Hollywood film franchises during the 1970s, including Rambo, Halloween, Rocky, and Superman. He also headed the Academy Award campaigns for many films, notably Terms of Endearment in 1983, American Beauty in 1999, and Gladiator in 2000.

The Actors Fund of America named the lobby of its Los Angeles headquarters in honor of Olson and his partner Eugene Harbin, in November 2004. Actress Shirley MacLaine presented Olson with the Actors Fund Medal of Honor, the organization's highest honor, on July 12, 2012.

Olson died of liver cancer at a nursing home in Burbank, California, on August 9, 2012, at the age of 78. He is buried at the Hollywood Forever Cemetery. He was survived by his partner of thirty years and husband since 2008, publicist Eugene Harbin.
