= Richard Markowitz =

American composer (1926–1994)

Richard Allen Markowitz (September 3, 1926 in Santa Monica, California – December 6, 1994 in Santa Monica, California) was an American film and television composer. He was the father of singer Kate Markowitz.

== Biography ==
As a Santa Monica High School student, Markowitz led a big band called Dick Allen and the Teenagers under the name Dick Allen. Following his graduation in 1943 he performed military service in World War II. After the war, Markowitz studied music in Paris and under Arthur Honegger and Arnold Schoenberg. While in Paris he played in jazz clubs and met his wife Haru Yanai.

Markowitz began film composing with the 1958 film Stakeout on Dope Street for director Irvin Kershner. He collaborated again with Kernsher on the films The Young Captives, (1959), Hoodlum Priest (1961), and Face in the Rain (1963). He collaborated with his wife on the score of the film Roadracers (1959) where Haru wrote lyrics to the songs. His other film scores included One Man's Way (1963), Bus Riley's Back in Town (1965), Wild Seed (1965), Ride Beyond Vengeance (1966), The Shooting (1966), which starred Warren Oates and Jack Nicholson, Cry for Me, Billy (1972), and Circle of Power (1981).

In 1961 he composed the score for Bert I. Gordon's The Magic Sword and began his television career composing the theme song and background music to The Rebel where the theme song was sung by Johnny Cash.

He again scored a well known Western TV series when he replaced Dimitri Tiomkin in conducting the theme and background music to The Wild Wild West. Keeping with the Western genre he scored the television movie (Scalplock) that spawned the series The Iron Horse as well as providing music for a variety of American television series and made for TV movies such as Weekend of Terror (1970), The Hanged Man (1974), Brinks: The Great Robbery (1976), Mayday at 40,000 Feet! (1976) and Death Car on the Freeway (1979).

== Television series scored by Markowitz ==
- The Invaders
- Bus Riley's Back in Town
- The FBI
- The Wild Wild West
- Mission: Impossible
- Mannix
- Quincy, M.E.
- Police Story
- Buck Rogers in the 25th Century
- Columbo
- The Streets of San Francisco
- Dynasty ( 2 episodes 1986 )

== Television ==
"Episode(s)" denotes the listing may be incomplete.

Year	Title	Info	On CD?
1949	Trouble, Inc.	(failed pilot)	NO
1961	Las Vegas Beat	TV movie (failed pilot)	NO
1962	Ben Casey	Episode(s): "Rigadoon for Three Pianos" (Season 2) "Will Everyone Who Believes in Terry Dunne Please Applaud" (season 2) "La Vie, La Vie Interieure" (season 2) "A Cardinal Act of Mercy -- Part 1" (season 2) "A Cardinal Act of Mercy -- Part 2" (season 2) "A Hundred More Pipers" (season 2) "The Echo of a Silent Cheer -- Part 1" (season 3) "The Echo of a Silent Cheer -- Part 2" (season 3) "Light Up the Dark Corners" (season 3) "There Was Once a Man in the Land of Uz" (season 3)	NO
1962	Empire	At least one episode.	NO
1963	Breaking Point	At least two episodes.	NO
1963	Postmark: Jim Fletcher	Episode(s): "(unknown title)" (failed pilot); And theme music.	NO
1965	Branded	Episode(s): "One Way Out" (season 1)	NO
1967	Custer	Episode(s): "Sabers In the Sun" (pilot)	NO
1967	Hondo	Episode(s): "Hondo and the Brave"; And theme music.	NO
1974	The Streets of San Francisco	Episode(s): "Mask of Death"	NO
1975	Joe Forrester	Episode(s): "Deadly Weekend: Part 1" "Deadly Weekend: Part 2"; And theme music.	NO
1976	Most Wanted	Episode(s): "The Slaver"	NO
1977	Hunter	Episode(s): "The Barking Dog"	NO
1976	Most Wanted	Episode(s): "Slaver"	NO
1976	The Quest	Episode(s): "The Buffalo Hunters"	NO
1978	The Runaways	Episode(s): "No Prince for My Cinderella" "Melinda and the Pinball Wizard" "Lies We Live With" "Too Young to Love"	NO
1978	Doctors' Private Lives	Episode(s): "Pilot" (only four episodes made; John Cacavas also on the series)	NO
1984	Glitter	At least one episode.	NO
1984	Murder, She Wrote	Total 72 episodes (from season 1 to 7)	NO
1986	Blacke's Magic	Episode(s): "Knave of Diamonds, Ace of Hearts" "Vanishing Act" "Prisoner of Paradise" "Forced Landing"	NO
1986	Dynasty	All episodes: "The Decision" "The Vigil"; Both episodes from season 6 and co-composed (uncredited) with Jack Smalley.	NO
1987	The Law and Harry McGraw	Episode(s): "Dead Men Don't Make Phone Calls" "Murder by Landslide" "Yankee Doodle Dandy" "The Fallen Arrow" "She's Not Wild About Harry" "Angela's Secret" (co-scored with Jack Smalley) "Solve It Again Harry" "Gilhooey's Is History" "Waiting Game"; Theme music nominated for an Emmy.	NO
