= Raymond Guth =

American film, stage, and television actor (1924–2021)

- Guth in Have Gun – Will Travel 1962
- Born: Raymond John Ruth; May 29, 1924; Oil City, Pennsylvania, U.S.
- Died: December 17, 2021 (aged 97); La Verne, California, U.S.
- Occupations: Film, stage and television actor

Raymond John Guth (May 29, 1924 – December 17, 2021) was an American film, stage and television actor.

== Early life ==
Guth was born on May 29, 1924, in Oil City, Pennsylvania. He studied acting at the Pasadena Playhouse while supporting himself Work nights at a morgue.

== Career ==
Guth originally performed in stage plays. In 1954 he was given an award as best actor by Theater Americana for his performance as Genesius in the play The Comedian. He made his film debut in 1956, appearing in the film The Flesh Merchant. Guth's first credited television appearance was in 1957 in the anthology series Alfred Hitchcock Presents. He continued to work with Hitchcock in film and television.

Guth made guest appearances in the television shows Wagon Train, The Virginian, Route 66, The High Chaparral, Daniel Boone, Tombstone Territory, Rawhide The Rifleman, Perry Mason, and Land of the Giants, and multiple appearances in Gunsmoke, Death Valley Days and Bonanza. He made two appearances in the sitcom television series Hazel. Guth's final appearances were in the television programs The Rookies, Happy Days, The Dukes of Hazzard, Little House on the Prairie, Hart to Hart, Moonlighting and Highway to Heaven.

Guth's film credits include The Bonnie Parker Story (1958), The Young Captives (1959), Operation Bikini (1963), The Hostage (1967), The Reivers (1969), Bad Company (1972), and Silver Streak (1976), starring Gene Wilder. His last film credit was for the 1982 film Some Kind of Hero.

== Death ==
Guth died on December 17, 2021, in La Verne, California, at the age of 97.

== Filmography ==
=== Film ===
Year	Title	Role	Notes
1957	The Unearthly	Police Officer Miller	
1958	The Bonnie Parker Story	Louisiana Sheriff	Uncredited
1959	The Young Captives	Mr. Kingston	
1963	Operation Bikini	Seaman Rich	Uncredited
1967	The Flim-Flam Man	First Fertilizer Man	
1967	The Hostage	Sam Morton	
1969	The Arrangement	Guard	Uncredited
1969	The Reivers	Uncle Ike	
1970	Monte Walsh	Sunfish Perkins	
1971	The Grissom Gang	Farmer	
1972	The Culpepper Cattle Co.	Cook	
1972	The New Centurions	Orville	Uncredited
1972	Bad Company	Jackson	
1973	Emperor of the North Pole	Preacher	Uncredited
1975	Funny Lady	Buffalo Handler	
1975	Hearts of the West	Wally	
1976	The Big Bus	Farmer	
1976	Silver Streak	Night Watchman	
1976	Bound for Glory	Hobo	
1979	The Onion Field	Prison Guard #2	
1982	Some Kind of Hero	Hotel Clerk	
1997	A Rat's Tale	Old Monty	Voice

=== Television ===
Year	Title	Role	Notes
1956	Dr. Christian	Evans	Episode: "Escaped Convict"
1957	Alfred Hitchcock Presents	Room Clerk	Season 2 Episode 15: "Crackpot"
1957	Schlitz Playhouse of Stars	Disgruntled Customer in cafe	2 episodes
1957	Wagon Train	Duke	Episode: "The Riley Gratton Story"
1957, 1958	Highway Patrol	George Carroll / Sam Barstow	2 episodes
1958	Tombstone Territory	George Pickett	Episode: "Gun Fever"
1958	Buckskin	Wilson	Episode: "A Picture of Pa"
1959	Man Without a Gun	Menlo	Episode: "Daughter of the Dragon"
1959	The Rebel	Pike Larson	Episode: "In Memoriam"
1959–1963	Gunsmoke	Various roles	4 episodes
1960–1970	Death Valley Days	Various roles	10 episodes
1961	Route 66	Johnny Langway	Episode: "Sheba"
1961	Two Faces West	Paul Bishop	Episode: "The Avengers"
1961	Gunslinger	Floyd Braden	Episode: "The Hostage Fort"
1961, 1963	Hazel	Manager / Chuck	2 episodes
1961–1964	Rawhide	Various roles	3 episodes
1961	Rawhide	Harms	S3:E26, "Incident of the Painted Lady"
1962	Shannon	Winters	Episode: "End of the Line"
1962	The Beachcomber	Doane Joyner / Ross	2 episodes
1962	Have Gun – Will Travel	Turkey Tate	Episode: "Beau Geste"
1962–1967	The Virginian	Various roles	3 episodes
1962–1971	Bonanza	Various roles	11 episodes
1963	Empire	Pawnbroker	Episode: "Stopover on the Way to the Moon"
1963	The Rifleman	Charlie Breen	Episode: "Incident at Line Shack Six"
1963	Laramie	Porter	Episode: "Vengeance"
1963	The Untouchables	Morrie	Episode: "A Taste for Pineapple"
1963	The Alfred Hitchcock Hour	Sam Hughes, Farmer	Season 2 Episode 3: "Terror at Northfield"
1963	The Great Adventure	McHugh	Episode: "A Boy at War"
1965	Perry Mason	Veterinarian	Episode: "The Case of the Careless Kitten"
1966	My Three Sons	Test Taker	Episode: "If at First"
1967	The Invaders	Guard #2	Episode: "Quantity: Unknown"
1967	Daniel Boone	Tatum	Episode: "Fort West Point"
1968	Land of the Giants	Tramp	Episode: "Ghost Town"
1968	Judd, for the Defense	Merle Sisk	Episode: "My Client, the Fool"
1968, 1970	The High Chaparral	Luther / Stableman	2 episodes
1971	Alias Smith and Jones	Farmer	Episode: "The Girl in Boxcar #3"
1971	Cade's County	Ansel Day	Episode: "Company Town"
1973	The Blue Knight	Lieutenant Hilliard	Television film
1976	The Rookies	Krueger	Episode: "Blue Movie, Blue Death"
1976	The Call of the Wild	Will	Television film
1977, 1983	Little House on the Prairie	Stage Guard / Dixon	2 episodes
1978	Family	Mr. Lewis	Episode: "Lifeline"
1979	Ebony, Ivory and Jade	Conductor	Television film
1979	The Dukes of Hazzard	Amos Stigger	Episode: "Dukes Meet Cale Yarborough"
1979	The Gift	Crony 2	Television film
1979	The Seekers	2nd Trapper	2 episodes
1980	Nobody's Perfect	Texan	Episode: "Daddy's Day"
1980, 1981	Happy Days	Mr. Gampolo	2 episodes
1981	Callie & Son	Curry	Television film
1982	Hart to Hart	Willie	Episode: "Harts and High Noon"
1984	Gone Are the Dayes	Farmer #1	Television film
1985	Highway to Heaven	Farmer	Episode: "Going Home, Going Home"
1986	Moonlighting	Townsman	Episode: "Atomic Shakespeare"
1988	Probe	Hotel Manager	Episode: "Computer Logic"
1988	Nightmare at Bittercreek	Gil Proctor	Television film
1995	The Legend of the Desert Bigfoot	Silas Varner	Television film
1998	Weird Science	Irritated Patient	Episode: "Genie Junior"
1999	Beyond Belief: Fact or Fiction	Old Timer	2 episodes
2000	The Last Dance	Mr. Pullman	Television film
