= Pazza famiglia =

Italian television series

- Created by: Enrico Montesano
- Country of origin: Italy
- No. of seasons: 2
- No. of episodes: 20

Original release
- Network: Rai 1
- Release: 1995 – 1996

Pazza famiglia is an Italian television series.

== Cast ==
- Enrico Montesano: Leonardo Capasso
- Alessandra Casella: Gianna
- Caterina Sylos Labini: Laura
- Kay Rush: Giulia
- Barbara Snellenburg: Lara
- Paolo Panelli: Paolo
- Carlo Cartier: Giorgio
- Riccardo Salerno: Michele
- Fabrizio Cerusico: Michele (second season)
- Vincenzo Crocitti: Osvaldo
- Alessandra Bellini: Valeria
- Luis Molteni: Loffredo
- Massimo Giuliani: Marcello
- Carlo Monni: Lawyer Piccioni
- Idris Sanneh: Mario
- Serena Grandi: Lisa
- Carlo Croccolo: Lawyer De Cuirtiis
- Patrizia Pellegrino: Luisa
- Enzo Cannavale: Rag. Peggio
- Gianni Musy: Victor

== See also ==
- List of Italian television series
