= Ride Beyond Vengeance =

1966 film by Bernard McEveety

- Theatrical release poster
- Directed by: Bernard McEveety
- Screenplay by: Andrew J. Fenady
- Based on: The Night of the Tiger; 1956 novel by Al Dewlen
- Produced by: Andrew J. Fenady
- Starring: Chuck Connors
- Cinematography: Lester Shorr
- Edited by: Otho Lovering
- Music by: Richard Markowitz
- Color process: Pathécolor
- Production company: Mark Goodson-Bill Todman Productions
- Distributed by: Columbia Pictures
- Release date: January 1966
- Running time: 101 minutes
- Country: United States
- Language: English
- Budget: $650,000

Ride Beyond Vengeance is a 1966 American Western film directed by Bernard McEveety and written and produced by Andrew J. Fenady. It stars Chuck Connors as Jonas Trapp, a buffalo hunter who returns to his hometown seeking revenge after being ambushed and left for dead. The screenplay is adapted from the short story The Night of the Tiger by Al Dewlen. Executive producers included Mark Goodson and Bill Todman, best known for their work in television game shows. The film features a title song performed by Glenn Yarbrough, then a member of the folk group The Limeliters. Produced on an estimated budget of $650,000, the film was released in January 1966.

Alternate titles for the film include Night of the Tiger, The Tiger Wore Guns (working title), and You Can't Ever Go Home Again (working title).

== Plot ==
A census taker arrives in the Texas town of Cold Iron, population 754. Seeking a cold beer, he enters the local bar and notices a painting of a violent street fight with a gun hanging above it. The bartender explains the story behind the painting, involving a buffalo hunter named Jonas Trapp and the infamous night known as both "The Night of the Reprisal" and "The Night of the Tiger."

In flashback, Jonas Trapp is a poor cowboy in love with wealthy Jessie Larkin. Despite opposition from her aunt, who wants Jessie to marry a man of means, the couple plans to wed. Jessie fakes a pregnancy to gain the aunt's approval, and Jonas reluctantly marries her. Dissatisfied with living off her wealth, Jonas asks Jessie to move with him to Dodge City so he can earn a living as a buffalo hunter. She refuses, and Jonas leaves, promising to return. Over eleven years, he builds his own fortune, while Jessie hears reports that he was killed by a gunfighter, Clay Allison, and believes him dead.

On his return, Jonas stumbles over a campfire and is ambushed by three men: Brooks Durham, the local banker; John "Johnsy Boy" Hood, a vain, sadistic hustler; and Coates, a notorious drunk. Accused of cattle rustling, Jonas is nearly lynched and branded with a hot iron. Left for dead, Durham steals his $17,000. Jonas is discovered and nursed back to health by a farmer named Hanley, but consumed by revenge, he returns to Cold Iron.

Jonas learns that Jessie's aunt has died and that Jessie is now engaged to Durham. When he meets Jessie on the street, she reacts with anger and fear, worried his return will ruin her future. Jonas hunts down the men who wronged him. He confronts Hood after a failed scheme, driving the young man to madness; Hood fatally impales himself with the branding iron and later commits suicide. Jonas also faces the saloon bouncer, nearly killing him in a violent fight before being stopped by his father.

Hanley is revealed as one of the rustlers, and Coates kills him over a dispute about Jonas' money. Coates attempts blackmail, but Durham threatens him, recalling his past exploits with guns. When Jonas finally confronts Durham, the banker admits to branding him and taking his money. Jonas rejects Durham's offer to return the funds, knocking him down. Coates attacks Jonas in drunken rage and is ultimately beaten and killed. Seeking to end the cycle of violence, Jonas leaves his gun on the bar and rides out of town. Jessie pleads with him to stay, but he refuses, leaving her standing in the street as his father urges her to follow.

The frame story resumes with the bartender showing the census taker the pistol Jonas left behind. When asked about Jessie, the bartender explains she left town and neither she nor Jonas was ever seen again. The census taker doubts she pursued him, but the bartender counters, reflecting that "you can never go home again" is only a song and "home" is just a word. As the census taker leaves Cold Iron, he pauses to look at Jessie's once-grand mansion, now in ruins.

== Cast ==
- Chuck Connors as Jonas Trapp, the Tiger
- Michael Rennie as Brooks Durham
- Kathryn Hays as Jessie Larkin Trapp
- Joan Blondell as Mrs. Lavender
- Gloria Grahame as Bonnie Shelley
- Gary Merrill as Dub Stokes
- Bill Bixby as Johnsy Boy Hood
- Claude Akins as Elwood Coates
- Paul Fix as Hanley
- Marissa Mathes as Maria (as Marrisa Mathes)
- Harry Harvey as Vogan (as Harry Harvey Sr.)
- William Bryant as Bartender
- Jamie Farr as Pete - Blacksmith
- Larry Domasin as The Mexican Boy
- Bill Catching as Drunk (as William Catching)
- James MacArthur as The Census Taker
- Arthur O'Connell as The Narrator
- Ruth Warrick as Aunt Gussie
- Buddy Baer as Mr. Kratz
- Frank Gorshin as Tod Wisdom
- Robert Q. Lewis as The Hotel Clerk

== Critical response ==
Film critic Glenn Erickson wrote that the film "fails in both story and production departments, as we never for a moment believe what we're seeing is a worthy drama," that "just about everything that happens is both unconvincing and badly conceived," that "most dramatic scenes are a complete embarrassment, including heavy turns by Gloria Grahame and a woefully inadequate Bill Bixby", and "continuity mismatching is difficult to ignore ... there's little else to keep our attention." A review of the film in TV Guide noted that "the violence in this film is brutal and almost gleefully sadistic," that it "has the look of a made-for-television film," and "with mediocre acting and a muddled story line, there's not much redeeming value in this piece."

== Alternate titles ==
- Night of the Tiger
- The Tiger Wore Guns (USA) (working title)
- You Can't Ever Go Home Again (USA) (working title)
