= Supreme Confession =

1956 film directed by Sergio Corbucci

- Spanish film poster
- Directed by: Sergio Corbucci
- Written by: Sergio Corbucci; Luciano Lucignani; Gianni Puccini; Piero Vivarelli
- Produced by: Artur Brauner; Sante Chimirri; Sergio Corbucci
- Starring: Anna Maria Ferrero; Massimo Serato; Sonja Ziemann
- Cinematography: Marco Scarpelli; Luciano Trasatti
- Edited by: Nino Baragli
- Music by: Carlo Innocenzi
- Production companies: CCC Film; La Gea Cinematografica
- Release date: 1956
- Running time: 91 minutes
- Countries: West Germany; Italy
- Language: Italian

Supreme Confession (Italian: Suprema confessione, German: Die große Sünde) is a 1956 Italian-West German melodrama film directed by Sergio Corbucci and starring Anna Maria Ferrero, Massimo Serato and Sonja Ziemann.

== Cast ==
- Anna Maria Ferrero as Giovanna Siri
- Massimo Serato as Marco Neri
- Andrea Checchi as Don Diego Garletto
- Barbara Shelley as Bettina
- Sonja Ziemann as Giovanna
- Luisa Rivelli
- Piero Lulli as Franz
- Arnoldo Foà as Armando
- Franco Andrei
- Franco Corelli as Tenor
- Nuccia Dalma
- Fedele Gentile
- Massimo Giuliani as son of Lisa and Mario

== Bibliography ==
- Bock, Hans-Michael & Bergfelder, Tim. The Concise CineGraph. Encyclopedia of German Cinema. Berghahn Books, 2009.
