= The Rebel (American TV series) =

American Western television series (1959–1961)

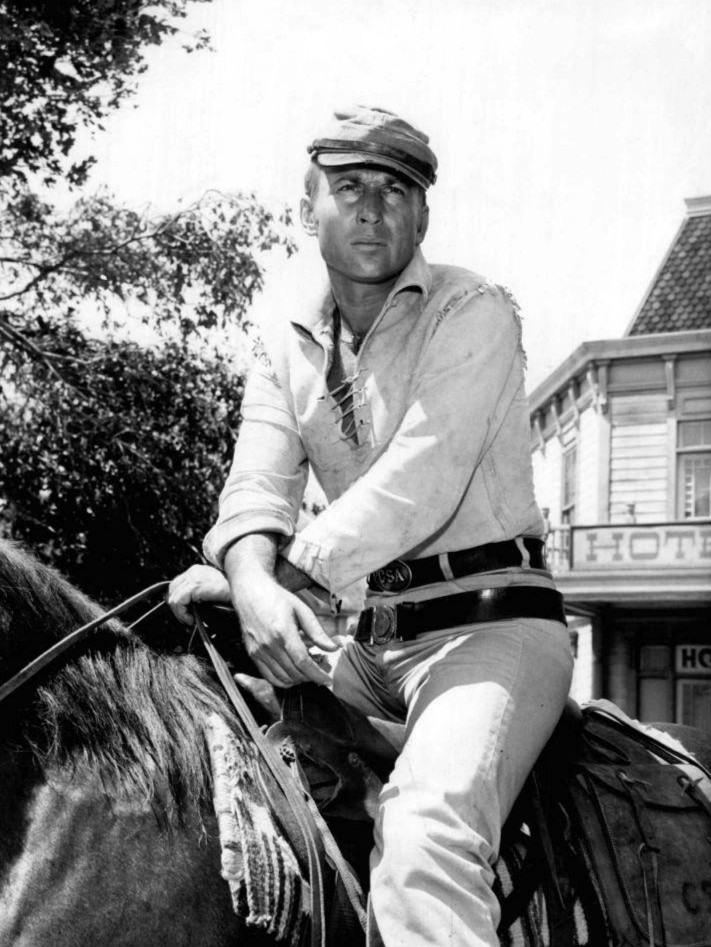
- Nick Adams as Johnny Yuma
- Created by: Andrew J. Fenady; Nick Adams
- Starring: Nick Adams
- Country of origin: United States
- Original language: English
- No. of seasons: 2
- No. of episodes: 76

Production
- Production locations: Paramount Pictures Studios; Hollywood, California
- Running time: 30 minutes
- Production companies: Celestial Productions; Fen-Ker-Ada Productions; Mark Goodson-Bill Todman Productions

Original release
- Network: ABC
- Release: October 4, 1959 – June 18, 1961

The Rebel is an American Western television series starring Nick Adams that ran on the ABC network from 1959 to 1961 for 76 episodes over 2 seasons. The Rebel was one of the few Goodson-Todman Productions outside of their game show ventures.

== Synopsis ==
The series portrays the adventures of young Confederate army veteran Johnny Yuma, an aspiring writer, played by Nick Adams. Haunted by his memories of the American Civil War, Yuma, in search of inner peace, roams the American West, specifically the Texas Hill Country and South Plains. He keeps a journal of his adventures and fights injustice where he finds it with a revolver and his dead father's sawed-off, double-barreled shotgun.

== Cast ==
=== Main ===
Adams was the star, and only regular actor of this series. He was involved in the show's design, inception, and writing, along with the producer, Andrew J. Fenady, who appeared twice in the series, once as United States Army General Philip Sheridan in the episode "Johnny Yuma at Appomattox", with George Macready as General Robert E. Lee. John Carradine appeared in two episodes as Elmer Dodson, the newspaper editor in Johnny Yuma's hometown, fictitious Mason City, Texas, who encourages Yuma to keep a journal of his travels.

John M. Pickard, formerly of the syndicated Boots and Saddles television series, appeared three times on The Rebel, including the role of Sheriff Pruett in "Run, Killer, Run". Hal Stalmaster played Skinny in the 1959 episode "Misfits", including Malcolm Cassell as Billy the Kid and Hampton Fancher as "Bull". The young "Misfits" enlist The Rebel's "help" to rob a bank, and in their minds live thereafter a life of leisure. Leonard Nimoy was cast as Jim Colburn in the 1960 episode "The Hunted", the story of an innocent man on the run from a posse that does not know that Colburn was acquitted by a jury.

Olive Sturgess guest-starred twice on The Rebel, as Jeannie in "The Scavengers" (1959) and as Charity Brunner, a woman in search of her missing miner husband, in "The Pit" (1961). In the second episode, Sturgess's real-life six-month-old nephew, Leonard Sturgess, played the baby required in the script.

=== Guest stars ===
- Charles Aidman
- Philip Ahn
- Claude Akins
- Fred Aldrich
- Michael Ansara
- Barry Atwater
- Michael Barrier
- Fred Beir
- James Best
- Robert Blake
- Dan Blocker
- Henry Brandon
- Patricia Breslin
- Victor Buono
- John Carradine
- Johnny Cash
- Spencer Chan
- James Chandler
- Iron Eyes Cody
- Elisha Cook, Jr.
- Bill Coontz
- Ellen Corby
- Vic Damone
- Royal Dano
- John Dehner
- Frank DeKova
- William Demarest
- Richard Devon
- George Dolenz
- James Drury
- Jack Elam
- Ross Elliott
- Jason Evers
- Richard Farnsworth
- Jamie Farr
- Virginia Field
- Duke Fishman
- Robert Foulk
- Steven Franken
- Kelton Garwood
- Ned Glass
- Mark Goddard
- Virginia Gregg
- Clu Gulager
- Raymond Guth
- William Harlow
- Stacy Harris
- Myron Healey
- Chuck Hicks
- Frieda Inescort
- Richard Jaeckel
- L.Q. Jones
- Harris Katleman
- Gail Kobe
- Wright King
- Otto Kruger
- Ethan Laidlaw
- Jody Lawrence
- Ruta Lee
- Lisa Lu
- John Marley
- Strother Martin
- Ken Mayer
- Lon McCallister
- Rod McGaughy
- Tyler McVey
- Patricia Medina
- Robert Middleton
- John Mitchum
- Joanna Moore
- Terry Moore
- Agnes Moorehead
- Ed Nelson
- Leonard Nimoy
- Arlene Martel
- Jeanette Nolan
- Jay Novello
- Warren Oates
- Cathy O'Donnell
- J. Pat O'Malley
- Gigi Perreau
- William Phipps
- Paul Picerni
- Joe Ploski
- Mala Powers
- Sue Randall
- Madlyn Rhue
- Paul Richards
- Tex Ritter
- Angelo Rossitto
- Gail Russell
- Mark Russell
- Soupy Sales
- Walter Sande
- Cosmo Sardo
- William Schallert
- James Seay
- Dan Sheridan
- Frank Silvera
- Bob Steele
- Olan Soule
- George Sowards
- Hal Stalmaster
- K.T. Stevens
- Warren Stevens
- Gloria Talbott
- Buck Taylor
- Vaughn Taylor
- Kenneth Tobey
- George Tobias
- Jack Tornek
- Harry Townes
- Brad Trumbull
- Robert Vaughn
- James Westerfield
- Peter Whitney
- Marie Windsor
- Carleton G. Young
- John Anderson

== Episodes ==
=== Season one (1959–60) ===
No. overall	No. in season	Title	Directed by	Written by	Original release date
1	1	"Johnny Yuma"	Irvin Kershner	Andrew J. Fenady	October 4, 1959
2	2	"Judgment"	Irvin Kershner	Peggy and Lou Shaw	October 11, 1959
3	3	"Yellow Hair"	Irvin Kershner	Andrew J. Fenady	October 18, 1959
4	4	"Vicious Circle"	Bernard L. Kowalski	Arthur Browne, Jr.	October 25, 1959
5	5	"Panic"	Irvin Kershner	Lester Aaron Pine	November 1, 1959
6	6	"The Scavengers"	Robert Ellis Miller	Sara Segal	November 8, 1959
7	7	"School Days"	Irvin Kershner	Jack Laird	November 15, 1959
8	8	"Dark Secret"	Irvin Kershner	Story by : David Victor; Teleplay by : Shimon Wincelberg	November 22, 1959
9	9	"Misfits"	Irvin Kershner	Arnold Belgard	November 29, 1959
10	10	"In Memoriam"	Irvin Kershner	Irving H. Cooper	December 6, 1959
11	11	"The Vagrants"	Irvin Kershner	Peggy and Lou Shaw	December 20, 1959
12	12	"Gun City"	Irvin Kershner	William Link and Richard Levinson	December 27, 1959
13	13	"The Death of Gray"	Bernard L. Kowalski	Richard Newman	January 3, 1960
14	14	"Angry Town"	Bernard L. Kowalski	Terence Kilpatrick	January 10, 1960
15	15	"Goldseeker"	Bernard McEveety	Andrew J. Fenady	January 17, 1960
16	16	"Glory"	Irvin Kershner	Arnold Belgard	January 24, 1960
17	17	"The Unwanted"	Irvin Kershner	Peter B. Germano	January 31, 1960
18	18	"The Crime"	Irvin Kershner	David Lang	February 7, 1960
19	19	"Noblesse Oblige"	Bernard L. Kowalski	Jack Laird	February 14, 1960
20	20	"Land"	Irvin Kershner	Gene L. Coon	February 21, 1960
21	21	"He's Only a Boy"	Bernard L. Kowalski	Terrence Kilpatrick	February 28, 1960
22	22	"Take Dead Aim"	Frank Baur	Richard Newman	March 6, 1960
23	23	"The Rattler"	Irvin Kershner	Sara Sagal	March 13, 1960
24	24	"You Steal My Eyes"	Irvin Kershner	Terrence Kilpatrick	March 20, 1960
25	25	"Fair Game"	Irvin Kershner	Richard Newman	March 27, 1960
26	26	"Unsurrended Sword"	Irvin Kershner	Peter B. Germano	April 3, 1960
27	27	"The Captive of Temblor"	Irvin Kershner	Milton S. Gelman	April 10, 1960
28	28	"Blind Marriage"	Irvin Kershner	Arnold Belgard	April 17, 1960
29	29	"Absolution"	Irvin Kershner	Peggy and Lou Shaw	April 24, 1960
30	30	"A Grave For Johnny Yuma"	Bernard L. Kowalski	Palmer Thompson	May 1, 1960
31	31	"In Memory Of A Son"	Irvin Kershner	Peggy and Lou Shaw	May 8, 1960
32	32	"Paint a House with Scarlet"	Irvin Kershner	Frederick Louis Fox	May 15, 1960
33	33	"Grant of Land"	Bernard L. Kowalski	Frank Chase	May 22, 1960
34	34	"Night on a Rainbow"	Irvin Kershner	Peggy and Lou Shaw	May 29, 1960
35	35	"Lady of Quality"	Bernard L. Kowalski	Hendrik Vollaerts	June 5, 1960
36	36	"The Earl of Durango"	Bernard L. Kowalski	Peggy and Lou Shaw	June 12, 1960

=== Season two (1960–61) ===
No. overall	No. in season	Title	Directed by	Written by	Original release date
37	1	"Johnny Yuma at Appomattox"	Bernard L. Kowalski	Andrew J. Fenady	September 18, 1960
38	2	"The Bequest"	Irvin Kershner	Albert Aley	September 25, 1960
39	3	"The Champ"	Bernard L. Kowalski	Sam Ross	October 2, 1960
40	4	"The Waiting"	Bernard L. Kowalski	Bruce Geller	October 9, 1960
41	5	"To See the Elephant"	Irvin Kershner	Jack Laird	October 16, 1960
42	6	"Deathwatch"	Irvin Kershner	Christopher Knopf	October 23, 1960
43	7	"Run, Killer, Run"	Bernard McEveety	Frederick Louis Fox	October 30, 1960
44	8	"The Hunted"	Irvin Kershner	Peggy and Lou Shaw	November 6, 1960
45	9	"The Legacy"	Bernard McEveety	Frank D. Gilroy	November 13, 1960
46	10	"Don Gringo"	Irvin Kershner	Cyril Hume	November 20, 1960
47	11	"Explosion"	Irvin Kershner	Frederick Louis Fox	November 27, 1960
48	12	"Vindication"	Bernard McEveety	Albert Aley	December 4, 1960
49	13	"The Scalp Hunter"	Bernard L. Kowalski	Harry Julian Fink	December 11, 1960
50	14	"Berserk"	Bernard McEveety	Frank Chase	December 18, 1960
51	15	"The Hope Chest"	Bernard L. Kowalski	Pat Fielder	December 25, 1960
52	16	"The Liberators"	Bernard L. Kowalski	Terrence Kilpatrick	January 1, 1961
53	17	"The Guard"	Bernard McEveety	Frederick Louis Fox	January 8, 1961
54	18	"The Promise"	Bernard L. Kowalski	Frederick Louis Fox	January 15, 1961
55	19	"Jerkwater"	Bernard L. Kowalski	Harry Julian Fink	January 22, 1961
56	20	"Paperback Hero"	Bernard L. Kowalski	Frederick Louis Fox	January 29, 1961
57	21	"The Actress"	Irvin Kershner	Bruce Geller	February 5, 1961
58	22	"The Threat"	Irvin Kershner	Christopher Knopf	February 12, 1961
59	23	"The Road to Jericho"	Bernard L. Kowalski	Cyril Hume	February 19, 1961
60	24	"The Last Drink"	Bernard L. Kowalski	Archie L. Tegland	February 26, 1961
61	25	"The Burying of Sammy Hart"	Bernard McEveety	Pat Fielder	March 5, 1961
62	26	"The Pit"	Irvin Kershner	Terrence Kilpatrick	March 12, 1961
63	27	"Shriek of Silence"	Irvin Kershner	Edward W. Walsh	March 19, 1961
64	28	"Two Weeks"	Bernard L. Kowalski	Frank Chase	March 26, 1961
65	29	"Miz Purdy"	Bernard McEveety	Harry Julian Fink	April 2, 1961
66	30	"The Ballad of Danny Brown"	Bernard McEveety	Jack Curtis	April 9, 1961
67	31	"The Proxy"	Bernard L. Kowalski	Jack Laird	April 16, 1961
68	32	"Decision at Sweetwater"	Bernard McEveety	Margaret Armen	April 23, 1961
69	33	"Helping Hand"	Irvin Kershner	Archie L. Tegland	April 30, 1961
70	34	"The Uncourageous"	Bernard McEveety	Peter B. Germano	May 7, 1961
71	35	"Mission: Varina"	Bernard L. Kowalski	Margaret Armen	May 14, 1961
72	36	"The Calley Kid"	Bernard L. Kowalski	Sam Ross	May 21, 1961
73	37	"Ben White"	Bernard L. Kowalski	Christopher Knopf	May 28, 1961
74	38	"The Found"	Bernard L. Kowalski	Pat Fielder	June 4, 1961
75	39	"The Hostage"	Bernard McEveety	Frederick Louis Fox	June 11, 1961
76	40	"The Executioner"	Bernard McEveety	Story by : Peggy and Lou Shaw; Teleplay by : Peggy and Lou Shaw, and Archie L. Tegland	June 18, 1961

== Series highlights ==
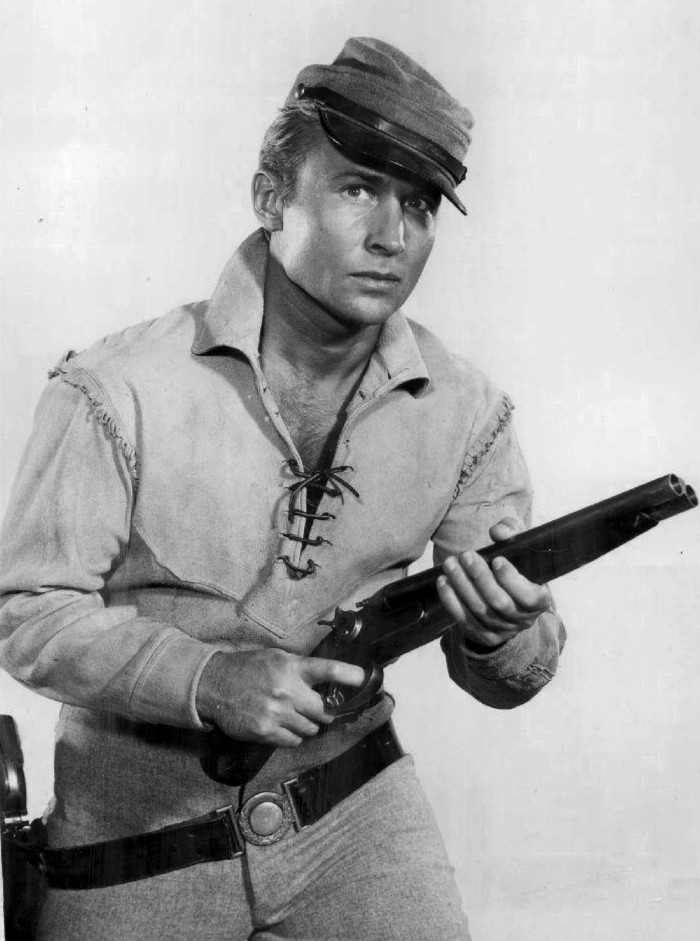
Nick Adams as Johnny Yuma

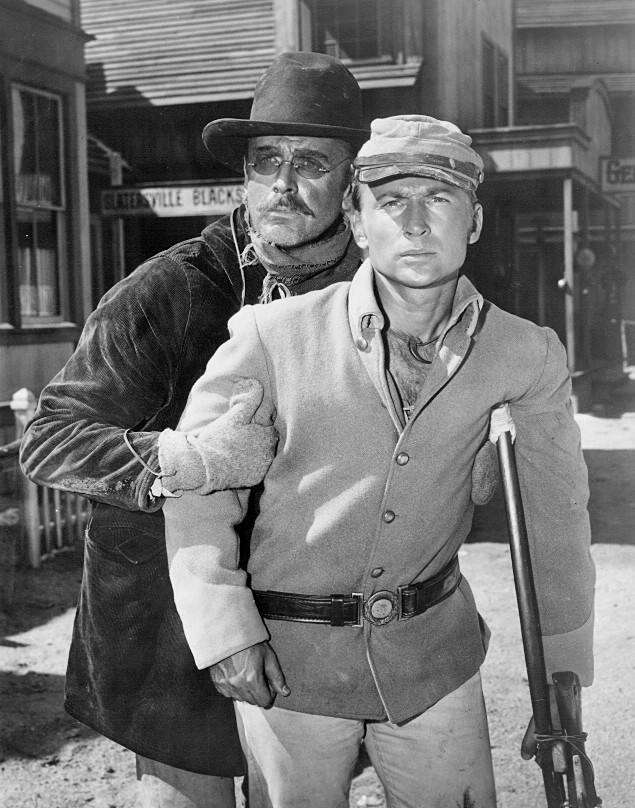
John Dehner and Nick Adams

The first episode, "Johnny Yuma", is set in early 1867. It shows Johnny Yuma returning to his hometown nearly two years after the end of the war. His father, Ned Yuma, the sheriff, had been killed by a gang who took control of the town. Dan Blocker plays the gang leader. Yuma gets his father's shotgun in this episode.

The third episode, entitled "Yellow Hair", has Yuma captured by the historical Kiowa chief Satanta, played by native Mexican Rodolfo Acosta, whose fictional adopted white daughter is played by Carol Nugent, Nick Adams' wife.

Several place names mentioned throughout the episodes clearly place the action in post-Civil War Texas, New Mexico, and Arizona. Forts noted in episodes, such as Fort Griffin and Fort Concho, were actual frontier Texas outposts of the late 1860s and are now state historic sites. In a first-season episode, Yuma encounters rag-tag rebel CSA soldiers in the corrupt mining town of La Paz, Arizona. The actual town of La Paz was the seat of Yuma County between 1862 and 1870; it stood in the Confederate Arizona Territory, which existed briefly during the Civil War. Nothing remains of La Paz but crumbling foundations and a historical marker.

Singing the theme song over the titles each week, Johnny Cash also appears as a frustrated would-be rapist playing a banjo with mounting intensity as he excitedly peers through a window at his tied-up prey in the 13th episode, "The Death of Gray".

In "Vicious Circle", Yuma identifies the Confederate unit he served in as the 3rd Texas, but he does not indicate the branch of service. Other episodes show saddlebags stenciled with CSA and an old uniform jacket with yellow collar and cuffs, indicating his regiment was likely the 3rd Texas Cavalry.

Robert Blake guest stars as an extremely young gunslinger in the episode titled "He's Only a Boy".

The 25th episode, "Fair Game", gained attention at the end of 2015 because it appears to be a principal source for Quentin Tarantino's feature The Hateful Eight, including a female prisoner (Patricia Medina) and a few significant plot twists.

After the show's original run on ABC finished in June 1961, it was picked up by NBC and rerun as a summer replacement series from June to September 1962.

== Cancellation ==
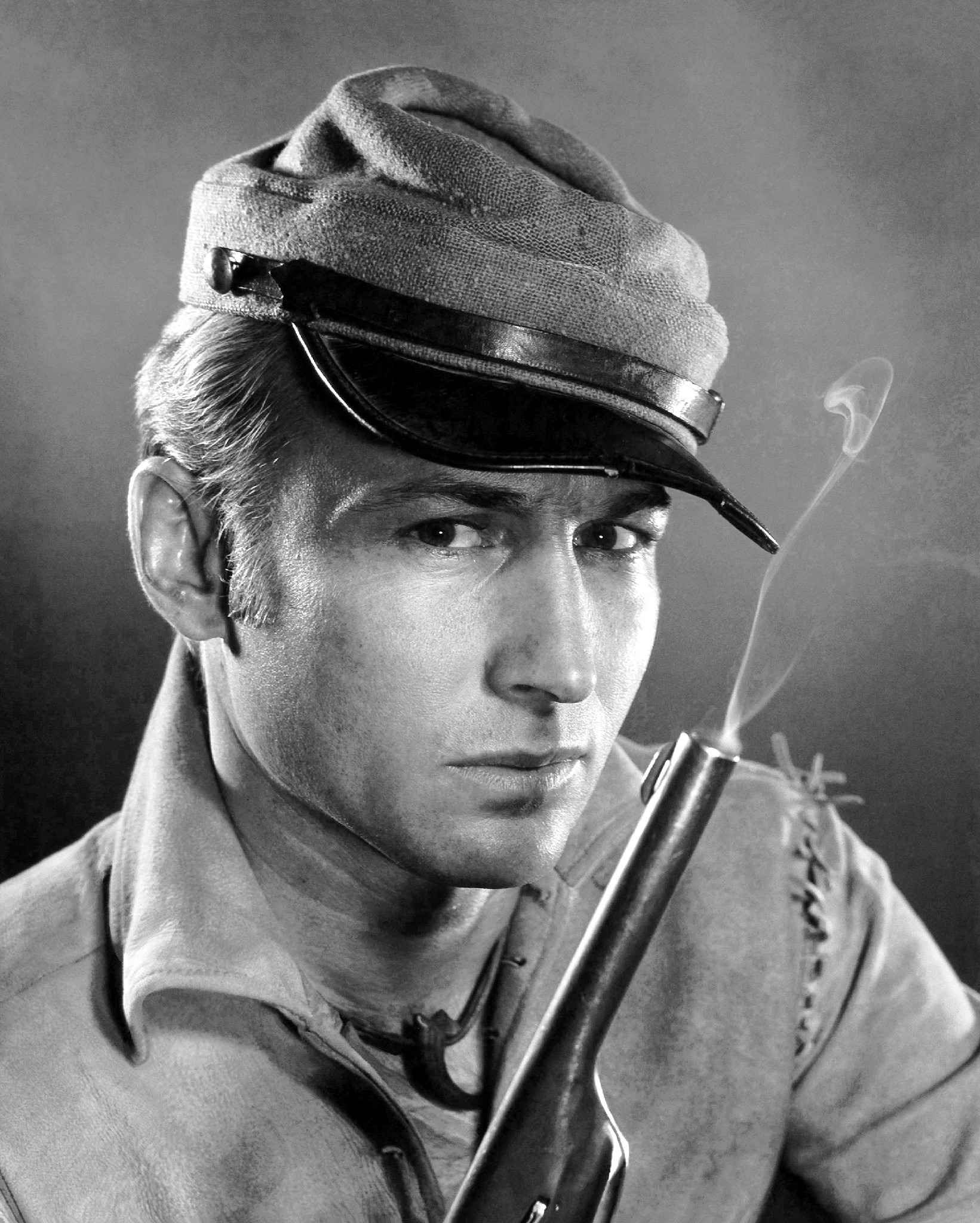
Adams as Yuma in 1960

The Rebel was a ratings success for ABC, commanding a 35% share of the Sunday-evening audience in its time slot, and was actually scheduled to be renewed for a third season, as part of a new hour-long series entitled The Rebel and The Yank, which would have again starred Nick Adams as the Rebel, and future The Virginian star James Drury starring as "the Yank", a former Union soldier working as a doctor in the Southern United States. Despite the show's success, ABC decided to pass on the series due to two factors, first, its violence (at a time when the network was trying to withdraw from violent programming), and second, the network's new "counterprogramming" format, in which a different type of show was scheduled against the network competition in that time slot, such as a comedy or variety show against an action-adventure show. Thus, The Rebel was cancelled, The Rebel and The Yank project never came to fruition. The series was replaced by a new variety show, starring Steve Allen. This program was not a success, lasting less than four months.

== Theme song ==
The show's theme song, "The Rebel" alias "The Ballad of Johnny Yuma", was composed by Richard Markowitz, with lyrics by Andrew J. Fenady. Members of the Western Writers of America chose it as one of the Top 100 Western songs of all time. It was recorded by Johnny Cash, but it was not released as a single until April 1961, shortly before the show went off the air. Nick Adams recorded the theme, which was released on Mercury Records (#71607) by March 1960. During syndication, the theme song was replaced by the DeWolfe Music Library instrumental track "Dodge City No. 1" by Jack Trombey.

== Popular culture ==
Two episodes of the sitcom Seinfeld referenced the first line of The Rebel theme song. In the episode "The Heart Attack", Jerry retorts to Kramer that Johnny Yuma is a Rebel. The Rebel was also a 1966 Allan Sherman song from the album Allan Sherman Live!; and later, in 1994, it was applied to the compilation album My Son, the Greatest.

== Merchandise ==
=== Board game ===
A board game based on the show was released by Ideal in 1961.

=== Comic books ===
In 1960 and 1961 Dell Comics (or Dell Publishing Co.) issued four stories based on The Rebel in their Four Color Comics anthology series: Issues #1076, #1138, #1207, and #1262.

=== Home media ===
On August 18, 2015, Timeless Media Group released The Rebel: The Complete Series on DVD in Region 1. The 11-disc set contained all 76 episodes of the series with bonus features.
