= Yale Wexler =

American actor

Yale Richard Wexler (February 6, 1930 – February 12, 1996) was an American actor who became a developer of real estate.

== Early years ==
Wexler was the son of Simon Wexler, the founder of Allied Radio Corporation, which became the RadioShack electronics retailer. His brothers were filmmaker Haskell Wexler and developer Jerrold Wexler. His sister was Joyce Wexler Isaacs (26 May 1927-7 June 2021) Wexler himself graduated from Francis Parker School (where he was co-captain of the basketball team) and studied theater at Carnegie Tech.

== Entertainment ==
Wexler worked in stock theater, including Malden Bridge Playhouse in New York and Pittsburgh Playhouse. His Broadway credits include Tea and Sympathy (1953) and The Best House in Naples (1956). He also worked behind the scenes, producing plays in Chicago. On film, Wexler starred in Stakeout on Dope Street (1958) and appeared in Time Limit (1957). He also had a multi-year tenure as chairman of the Chicago International Film Festival. He acted on television in soap operas and in four episodes of You Are There.

== Property development ==
In 1974, Wexler left acting after his brother asked him to take charge of remodeling two hotels in Chicago. He went on to become chairman of the Management Group, which operates various properties, including hotels, around the United States.

== Personal life ==
On December 21, 1960, Wexler married actress Linda Cristal in Chicago. They had two sons, Jordan and Gregory, and divorced in 1967.

== Death ==
On February 12, 1996, Wexler died at his home in Chicago, Illinois. He was 66.

== Selected filmography ==
- Alfred Hitchcock Presents (1959) (Season 5 Episode 5: "No Pain") as Arnold Barrett
