= William Harlow =

American actor and playwright

- Harlow in Combat!, 1963
- Born: William Ralph Groves; January 7, 1922; Barnesville, Ohio, U.S.
- Died: January 21, 1996 (aged 74); Morongo Valley, California, U.S.
- Occupations: Actor, playwright
- Spouse: Joy Groves

William Ralph Groves (January 7, 1922 – January 21, 1996) was an American actor and playwright. He was best known for playing the recurring role of Private Davis in the American drama television series Combat!.

== Early life and career ==
Harlow was born in Barnesville, Ohio. He began his screen career in 1959, appearing in the ABC western television series The Rebel. From 1965 to 1966, he appeared in the NBC western television series Branded.

Later in his career, Harlow guest-starred in television programs including Emergency!, B. J. and the Bear, Knight Rider and Chase, and played the recurring role of Private Davis in the ABC drama television series Combat!. During his screen career, he wrote the stage plays A Musical Evening with Abraham Lincoln and The Pleasures of Judy Pepper.

Harlow retired from acting in 1986, last appearing in the television film Who Is Julia?. Aside from acting, he was a puppeteer.

== Personal life and death ==
Harlow was married to Joy Groves, an actress. Their marriage lasted until Harlow's death in 1996.

Harlow died of lung cancer at his home in Morongo Valley, California on January 21, 1996, at the age of 74.
