= Alessandra Casella (actress) =

Italian actress

- Born: 16 August 1963 (age 62); Milan, Italy
- Occupations: Actress; Comedian; Presenter

Alessandra Casella (born 16 August 1963) is an Italian actress, comedian and television presenter.

== Life and career ==
Born in Milan, Casella studied acting at the Accademia dei Filodrammatici and at the Lee Strasberg Theatre and Film Institute. After making her professional debut in New York in 1981, she returned to Italy, where she worked on stage with the companies of Giulio Bosetti and Arnoldo Foà. She had her breakout thanks to her comic impersonation of the journalist Lilli Gruber, featured on the variety shows La TV delle ragazze (1988) and Ricomincio sul due (1990). She got her main success with A tutto volume, a late night Italia 1 program about books she created and hosted between 1992 and 1994. In 1995, she returned to RAI, where she hosted several programs including La domenica sportiva and the Rai 1 talk show Seconda serata, and starred alongside Enrico Montesano in the comedy series Pazza famiglia.

During her career, Casella also appeared in a number of comedy films, notably Le finte bionde and Le comiche. She is also a writer, a columnist and a playwright.
