= Stakeout on Dope Street =

1958 film by Irvin Kershner

- Theatrical release poster
- Directed by: Irvin Kershner
- Written by: Andrew J. Fenady; Irvin Kershner; Irwin Schwartz
- Produced by: Andrew J. Fenady
- Starring: Yale Wexler; Abby Dalton; Steven Marlo; Allen Kramer; Jonathon Haze
- Cinematography: Mark Jeffrey
- Edited by: Melvin Sloan
- Music by: Richard Markowitz
- Distributed by: Warner Bros. Pictures
- Release date: May 3, 1958
- Running time: 89 minutes
- Country: United States
- Language: English
- Budget: $31,000

Stakeout on Dope Street is a 1958 American crime film directed by Irvin Kershner and written by Andrew J. Fenady, Irvin Kershner and Irwin Schwartz. It follows three teenagers who inadvertently get themselves involved in a drug ring. It was the directorial debut of Kershner. The film stars Yale Wexler, Abby Dalton, Steven Marlo, Allen Kramer, Herschel Bernardi and Jonathon Haze. The film was released by Warner Bros. Pictures on May 3, 1958.

== Plot ==
Late one night in Los Angeles, Sgt. Fred Matthews (Frank Harding) and Officer Lynn Donahue (Slate Harlow) arrest a pusher who is carrying two pounds of uncut heroin. They are ambushed by gangsters Mitch Swadurski (Herman Rudin) and Lenny Potter (Philip Mansour), who kill Matthews and wound Donahue, then kill the pusher after he tosses the briefcase containing the heroin into the underbrush.

Next day, the case is found by eighteen-year-old Julian "Ves" Vespucci (Jonathon Haze) as he delivers groceries from his father's store. Ves and his pals, would-be artist Jim Bowers (Yale Wexler) and bodybuilder Nick Raymond (Steven Marlo) find the case contains samples of women's cosmetics. The canister containing the heroin is labeled "face powder", so they throw the can away, although Jim keeps some powder for his girl friend Kathy.

The boys pawn the briefcase. Jim takes the samples to Kathy and proposes to her. Kathy is afraid he will be unable to support them. Jim sees a newspaper headline about the missing narcotics. He rushes to tell Nick and Ves, but the canister has since been picked up by a garbage truck.

After a frantic search at the city dump, they find it. Nick convinces Jim and Ves to meet Danny, a heroin addict. The police and the mob are searching for the drugs, using every contact they have in the underworld and on the streets. Danny is thrilled by the small "test" packet of heroin brought to him by the boys and agrees to sell it for them.

The three are awed by the money that Danny gets for the heroin. Nick and Ves go shopping, while Jim buys a bracelet for Kathy. When he explains where he got the money, Jim is surprised by Kathy's vehement rejection of the bracelet. She upbraids him for profiting from others' weakness.

Danny relates to Jim in harrowing detail how he got addicted. Deeply moved by Danny's story, Jim grows more reluctant to continue selling.

The police obtain their first break when the pawnbroker reports the briefcase he bought from the boys. He recalls that one was named Nick and worked in a garage. Lenny and Mitch learn from a local pusher that Danny has been selling heroin. Jim wants out of the scheme completely, wanting to give the drugs to the police.

Danny is brutally questioned by Lenny and Mitch at his shack. Nick goes to collect the day's earnings from Danny, and he, too, is beaten by the gangsters. Ves is also captured by Mitch and Lenny, who force him to call Jim. Begged to bring the rest of the drugs to Danny's, Jim insists that he is going to the police.

Jim retrieves the canister and the gangsters pursue him. As Ves then telephones the police, Jim climbs a tower in a power plant. Mitch climbs after him, but Jim pours the can of heroin onto Mitch's upturned face. The police arrive and capture Lenny, then shoot Mitch, who falls to his death. Jim is told that Nick is in the hospital. He and Ves are arrested and led off to face the consequences of their greed.

== Cast ==
- Yale Wexler as Jim Bowers
- Jonathon Haze as Julian 'Ves' Vespucci
- Steven Marlo as Nick Raymond (as Morris Miller)
- Abby Dalton as Kathy
- Allen Kramer as Danny
- Herman Rudin as Mitch Swardurski
- Philip Mansour as Lenny Potter (as Phillip Mansour)
- Frank Harding as Police Capt. Richard R. Allen
- William Shaw as Chuck (as Bill Shaw)
- Andrew J. Fenady as Stan (as A.J. Fenady)
- Slate Harlow as Police Officer Lynn Donahue
- Herschel Bernardi as Mr. Fennel

== Production ==
The film was financed by Roger Corman who was executive producer. He provided $15,000 of the budget.

Corman later recalled:

My brother told me that it was the greatest mistake of my career because on account of that success I reinvested my money in other productions that were all failures. I gave great freedom to the writers, since I myself do not like when people tell me what to do when I’m filming. I never said a word to Kershner. We would meet and have long talks in which everyone offered his point of view, and I would approve the cast and the distribution (Jack Hayes, Abby Dalton, and some of my actors would be there), but once the decision was made, I would say, "Go for it," and I would pull back. This was hugely successful.
