= Hondo (TV series) =

American television series

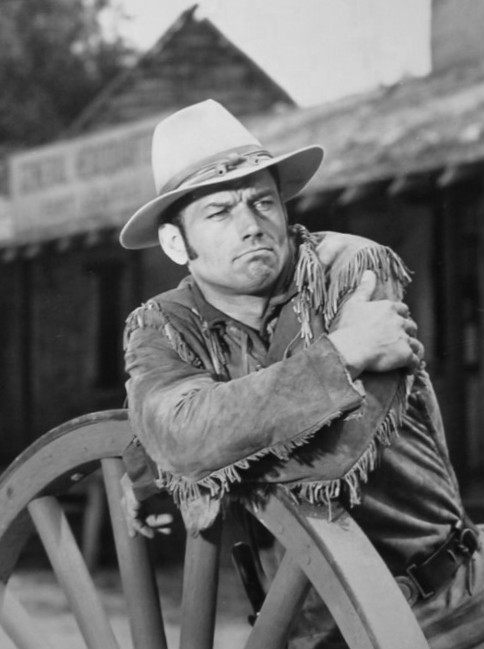
- Taeger as Hondo Lane.
- Genre: Western
- Developed by: Andrew J. Fenady
- Written by: Andrew J. Fenady; Frank Chase; Stanley Adams; George F. Slavin
- Directed by: Lee H. Katzin; Michael Moore; William Witney; Harry Harris
- Starring: Ralph Taeger; Kathie Browne; Noah Beery; Gary Clarke; Michael Pate; William Bryant; Buddy Foster
- Theme music composer: Richard Markowitz
- Composers: Richard Markowitz; Vic Mizzy (one episode)
- Country of origin: United States
- Original language: English
- No. of seasons: 1
- No. of episodes: 17

Production
- Producer: Andrew J. Fenady
- Running time: 60 minutes
- Production companies: Batjac Productions; Fenady Associates; MGM Television

Original release
- Network: ABC
- Release: September 8 – December 29, 1967

Hondo is an American Western drama series starring Ralph Taeger that aired on ABC from September 8 until December 29, 1967 during the 1967 fall season. The series was produced by Batjac Productions, Inc., Fenady Associates, Inc., and MGM Television.

== Overview ==
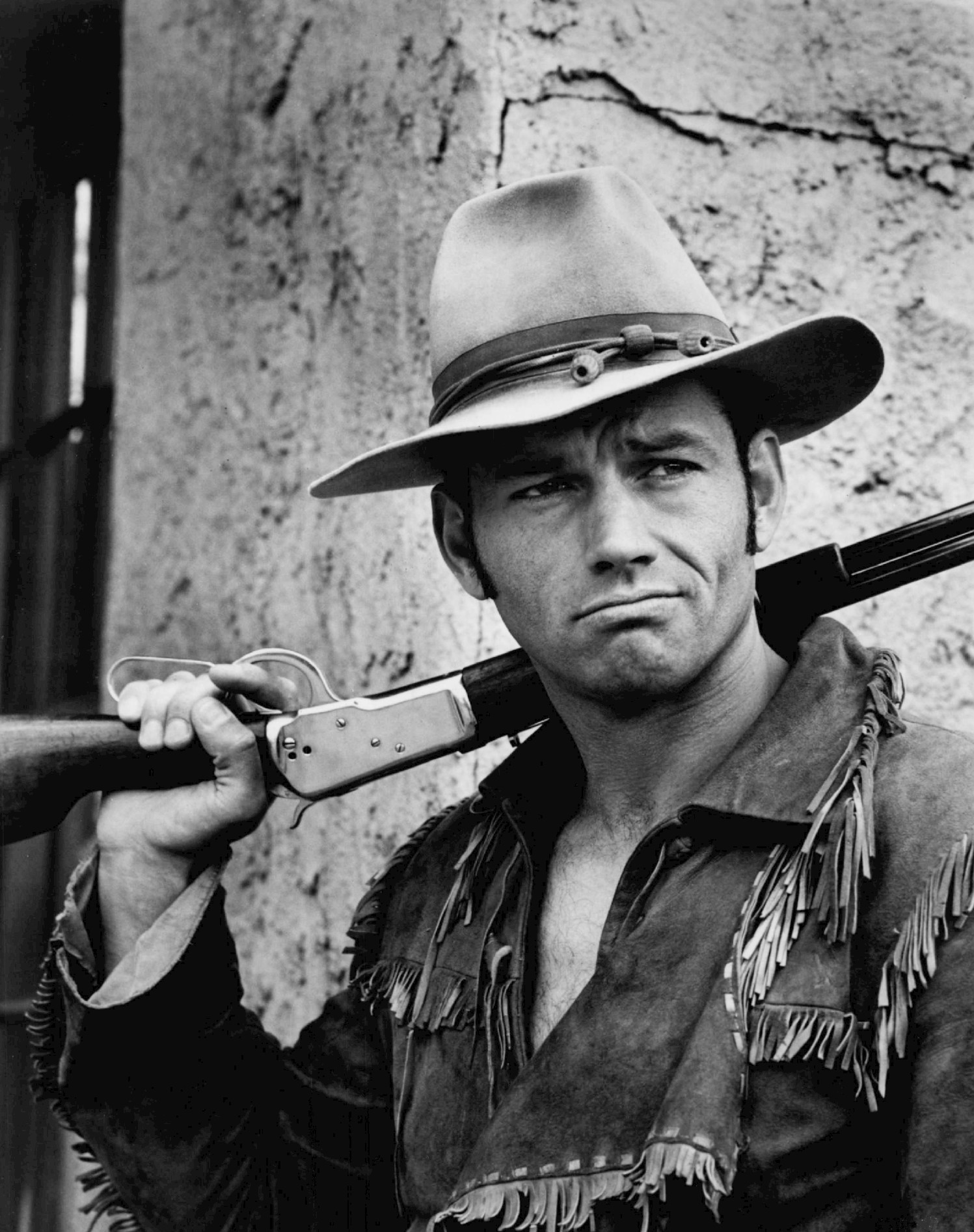
Taeger as Hondo

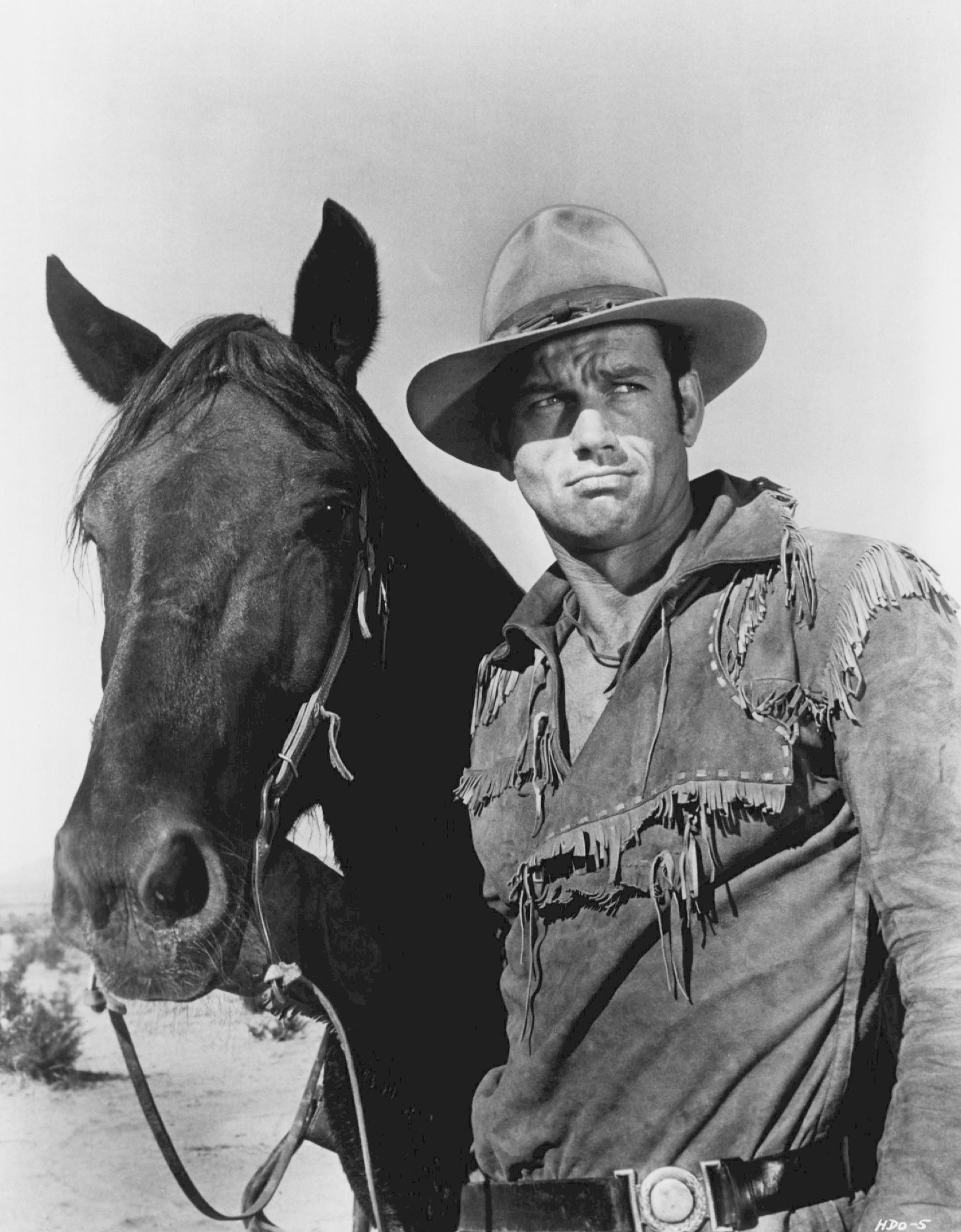
Taeger in Hondo

Hondo is based on the 1953 3D film of the same name starring John Wayne and Geraldine Page, which was in turn an offshoot of a July 5, 1952 Collier's short story "The Gift of Cochise". Below the name of the teleplay author, each episode states, "Hondo" based on a screenplay by James Edward Grant/from a story by Louis L'Amour.

The storyline concerns Hondo Lane, a former Confederate cavalry officer who had moved west following the Civil War and taken an Indian bride, only to see her killed as part of a massacre of Indians conducted by United States Army troops. Now Hondo and his dog, Sam, travel alone and seek to prevent further trouble between the Army and the remaining Indians. They also fight to counter land grabbers and other outlaws.

Noah Beery Jr. portrays Hondo's frequent sidekick, Buffalo Baker, who had been played by Ward Bond in the original movie version with John Wayne. The little boy, Johnny Dow, is played by Buddy Foster, older brother of Jodie Foster.

While the Wayne film had been fairly successful, this series, airing against the hit sitcom Gomer Pyle, U.S.M.C. on CBS and Star Trek on NBC, was soon canceled, with the last broadcast occurring on December 29, 1967.

The rule of thumb for broadcast syndication is at least 100 episodes, but Hondo, with only seventeen segments, became popular after it left the air and became the subject of an article in The Wall Street Journal. One venue for broadcasting Hondo during early 2020s has been GetTV.

The first two episodes were edited together to form the feature film Hondo and the Apaches, which was released theatrically outside of North America.

== Cast ==
Actor	Role
Ralph Taeger	Hondo Lane
Kathie Browne	Angie Dow
Noah Beery	Buffalo Baker
Gary Clarke	Captain Richards
Michael Pate	Chief Vittoro
William Bryant	Colonel Crook
Buddy Foster	Johnny Dow

== Episodes ==
No.	Title	Directed by	Written by	Original release date
1	"Hondo and the Eagle Claw"	Lee H. Katzin	Andrew J. Fenady	September 8, 1967
starring Ralph Taeger. Kathie Browne. Michael Rennie as Tribolet. co–starring Noah Beery, Gary Clarke, Michael Pate, William Bryant, Buddy Foster. guest stars Gary Merrill as General Sheridan. Randy Boone as Sean. and John Smith as Ed Dow. with Victor Lundin as Silva, Jim Davis as Krantz, John Pickard as Lieutenant, Steve Marlo as Reese. special guest appearance Robert Taylor as Gallagher. Uncredited: William "Bill" Walker, Hank Worden [miners] Hondo searches for Apache chief Vittoro in order to invite him to a peace parley with General Sheridan.
2	"Hondo and the War Cry"	Lee H. Katzin	Andrew J. Fenady	September 15, 1967
starring Ralph Taeger. Kathie Browne. Michael Rennie as Tribolet. co–starring Noah Beery, Gary Clarke, Michael Pate, William Bryant, Buddy Foster. guest star Randy Boone as Sean. with Victor Lundin as Silva, Jim Davis as Krantz, Don Collier as Drover, Abel Fernandez as Indian. special guest appearance Robert Taylor as Gallagher. Uncredited: Red Morgan [drover], Noble Chissell [bar patron], Hank Worden [miner] Captain Richards leads his troops against Vittoro, who has agreed to peace talks.
3	"Hondo and the Singing Wire"	William Witney	George Schenck	September 22, 1967
starring Ralph Taeger. guest stars Pat Conway as Redell, Perry Lopez as Delgado, Donald Woods as Stanton. co–starring Kathie Browne [credited but does not appear], Noah Beery, Gary Clarke, Michael Pate, William Bryant, Buddy Foster. with Iron Eyes Cody as Chief, Red Morgan as Morgen, Stan Barrett as Diamond and Donald Barry as Sergeant Daniels. Hondo becomes embroiled in a feud between a renegade Apache and the hot-tempered foreman of the crew erecting telegraph wires near Fort Whipple.
4	"Hondo and the Superstition Massacre"	Lee H. Katzin	Andrew J. Fenady	September 29, 1967
starring Ralph Taeger. guest stars Robert Reed as Frank Davis. Nancy Malone as Mary Davis. co–starring Kathie Browne, Noah Beery, Gary Clarke, Michael Pate, William Bryant, Buddy Foster. with Willard Sage as Sgt. Able, Michael Lane as Moon Dog, Claude Hall as Unwashed, Ed McCready as Sergeant. Uncredited: Red Morgan [trooper] Superstition Mountain may hold a possible gold lode and the Army sends for surveyor whom Hondo recognizes as leader of the massacre that included his Indian wife among the victims.
5	"Hondo and the Savage"	Michael Moore	Frank Chase	October 6, 1967
starring Ralph Taeger. guest stars Nico Minardos as Ponce. Charles McGraw as General Rutledge. co–starring Kathie Browne [credited but does not appear], Noah Beery, Gary Clarke, Michael Pate [credited but does not appear], William Bryant, Buddy Foster [credited but does not appear]. with Bill Henry as Sand, Tom Monroe as Dink, James Beck as Sergeant, Carmelita Acosta as Canoa, Iron Eyes Cody as Elderly Brave [credited but does not appear]. Indian-fighting General Rutledge arrives at Colonel Crook's fort and threatens to disrupt the delicate peace that Hondo had arranged.
6	"Hondo and the Apache Kid"	William Witney	Frank L. Moss	October 13, 1967
7	"Hondo and the War Hawks"	Michael D. Moore	Donn Mullally	October 20, 1967
A new colonel (John Carroll) wants to retrieve hunting weapons given to Vittoro's people.
8	"Hondo and the Mad Dog"	Arthur H. Nadel	Nathaniel Tanchuck	October 27, 1967
A killer tries to prove witness Sam has rabies; with James MacArthur, Royal Dano.
9	"Hondo and the Judas"	Lee H. Katzin	Story by : Andrew J. Fenady; Teleplay by : Frank Chase	November 3, 1967
William Quantrill (Forrest Tucker) reconvenes his Raiders and asks Hondo to join; with Rick Nelson, John Agar, John Carradine.
10	"Hondo and the Comancheros"	Michael D. Moore	Frank Paris	November 10, 1967
11	"Hondo and the Sudden Town"	Harry Harris	Palmer Thompson	November 17, 1967
12	"Hondo and the Ghost of Ed Dow"	Harry Harris	Stanley Adams and George F. Slavin	November 24, 1967
13	"Hondo and the Death Drive"	William Witney	Peter B. Germano	December 1, 1967
14	"Hondo and the Hanging Town"	Alan Crosland Jr.	Stanley Adams and George F. Slavin	December 8, 1967
15	"Hondo and the Gladiators"	Eddie Saeta	Turnley Walker	December 15, 1967
16	"Hondo and the Apache Trail"	Michael Caffey	William Froug	December 22, 1967
17	"Hondo and the Rebel Hat"	Michael D. Moore	Max Hodge	December 29, 1967

== Home media ==
On June 13, 2017, Warner Bros. released the entire series on DVD via their Warner Archive manufacture-on-demand service.
