= A Face in the Rain =

1963 film by Irvin Kershner

- Original theatrical poster
- Directed by: Irvin Kershner
- Written by: Hugo Butler; Jean Rouverol
- Produced by: John Calley
- Starring: Rory Calhoun; Marina Berti; Niall MacGinnis
- Cinematography: Haskell Wexler
- Music by: Richard Markowitz
- Distributed by: Embassy Pictures Corporation
- Release date: 1963
- Running time: 81 minutes
- Country: United States
- Language: English

A Face in the Rain is a 1963 film by Irvin Kershner.

== Plot ==
Rand, an American spy, dropped behind enemy lines in Nazi-occupied Italy, seeks shelter in the house of the wife of the local resistance leader, Anna, who is having an affair with Gestapo officer Klaus.

== Cast ==
- Marina Berti as Anna
- Rory Calhoun as Rand
- Massimo Giuliani as Paolo
- Niall MacGinnis as Klaus
- Danny Ryals as German Lt.
