= The Young Captives =

- Original theatrical poster
- Directed by: Irvin Kershner
- Written by: Al Burton; Andrew J. Fenady; Gordon Hunt
- Produced by: Andrew J. Fenady
- Starring: Steven Marlo; Luana Patten; Tom Selden; James Chandler
- Cinematography: W. Wallace Kelley
- Edited by: Terry O. Morse
- Music by: Richard Markowitz
- Distributed by: Paramount Pictures
- Release date: February 1959
- Running time: 61 minutes
- Language: English

The Young Captives is a 1959 film directed by Irvin Kershner and starring Steven Marlo, Luana Patten, Tom Selden and James Chandler.

== Plot ==
A young man running from the law after committing murder convinces a young couple to take him with them as they travel across the border to Mexico to elope.
