= Claudia Catani =

Italian actress and voice artist

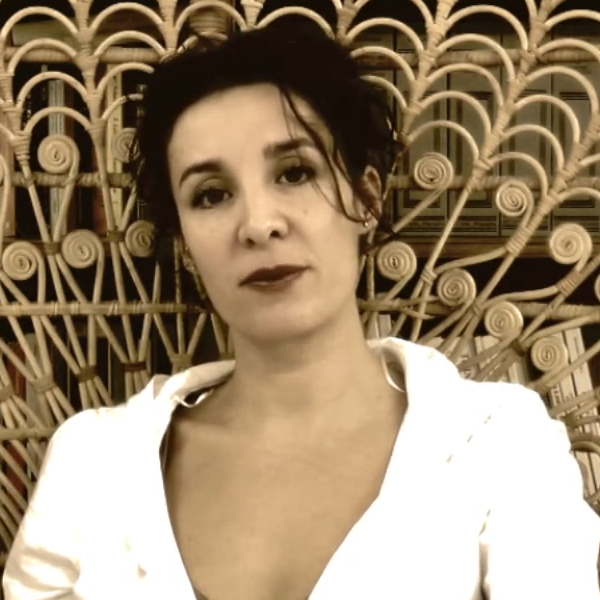
- Claudia Catani in 2011
- Born: 14 August 1969 (age 57); Teheran, Iran
- Occupations: Actress, voice artist

Claudia Catani (born 14 August 1969) is an Italian actress and voice artist.

== Filmography ==
- L'amante dell'Orsa Maggiore - TV miniseries (1983)
- Una storia importante (1988)
- Il resto con i miei occhi (2017)

=== Voice dubbing ===
Catani has provided voices for the Italian versions of the following:

- Cameron Diaz in Knight and Day (June Evans), My Sister's Keeper (Sara Fitzgerald)
- Janine Turner as Maggie O'Connell in Northern Exposure
- Gillian Anderson as Dana Scully in the television series The X-Files, and as Meredith in the film Playing by Heart
- Patricia Arquette as Allison Dubois in the television series Medium, and as Frankie Paige in the film Stigmata
- Juliette Binoche in Les Amants du Pont-Neuf
- Sandrine Bonnaire in Le Ciel de Paris
- Rebecca Romijn-Stamos in Femme fatale (2002)
- Natalie Imbruglia in Johnny English
- Alyssa Milano in Wisegal
- Sara Canning (Jenna Sommers) in The Vampire Diaries
- Charlize Theron in The Devil's Advocate (Mary Ann Lomax), and Sweet November (Sara Deever)
- Joanna Bacalso in Snow Dogs (Barb)
- Katharina Böhm in Inspector Montalbano (TV series) (Livia Burlando)
- Charisma Carpenter in Charmed (Kira, the seer)
- Mary-Louise Parker in The Spiderwick Chronicles (Helen Grace)
- Rebecca Hall in Vicky Cristina Barcelona (Vicky)
- Lena Headey in Game of Thrones (Cersei Lannister)
- Rachel Weisz in Fred Claus (Wanda), Definitely, Maybe (Summer Hartley)
- Rosemarie DeWitt in Cinderella Man (Sara Wilson)
- Diora Baird in My Best Friend's Girl (Rachel)
- Toni Collette in United States of Tara (Tara Craine)
- Marion Cotillard in Nine (Luisa Contini), Inception (Mal), Contagion (Dr. Leonora Orantes), and The Dark Knight Rises (Miranda Tate)
- Bridget Moynahan in Serendipity (Halley)
- Denise Richards in The Third Wheel (Diana)
- Mili Avital in Kissing a Fool (Sam)
- Christa Miller in Scrubs (Jordan Sullivan)
- Claire Forlani in Camelot (Regina Igraine)
- Robin Wright in White Oleander (Starr)
- Meg Ryan in City of Angels (Maggie Rice)
- Kate Beahan in The Wicker Man (Sister Willow)

She has also done voiceovers for Gwyneth Paltrow, and Naomi Watts in some important roles.
Recently, Catani has also provided voices for Jennifer Tilly, Hilary Swank, and Angelina Jolie.

- Michiko Malandro in the anime Michiko e Hatchin
- Cammy in the anime Street Fighter II V
- Hilda in the anime Eureka Seven
