= Shawn C. Nelson =

American actor and acting coach

Shawn Clement Nelson is an American actor and acting coach.

== Biography ==
Nelson was born in Baton Rouge, Louisiana. He began teaching acting in New Orleans, Louisiana, in his early twenties after attending Louisiana State University and graduating from the North Carolina School of the Arts in Drama. There, he was a classmate of Broadway and film stars Tom Hulce and Terrence Mann. He later moved to Houston, Texas, where he taught at Patrick Swayze's mother Patty's studio. While in Houston, he found his first major film role in Joe Dante's Piranha. He later appeared in two other Dante pictures, Innerspace and Gremlins 2.

Nelson moved to Los Angeles in 1979 and studied for a second time with film actor Donald Hotton, a student of Mira Rostova. When Hotton moved back to New York, Nelson took up the teaching and coaching mantle.

== Career ==
In her book Homesick, Sela Ward praises Nelson as the coach with whom she worked on every episode of the NBC series Sisters, for which she won an Emmy Award.

Nelson created and published a CD audio course on acting, The Impersonal Actor, recommended reading in some college and university courses.

A member of the Directors Guild of America, he has guest instructed in acting at Louisiana State University and Pasadena City College in California; and taught directors at Yavapai College Zaki Gordon Film Institute in Sedona, Arizona, and at Filmmakers Alliance in Los Angeles.

As a dialect coach, Nelson worked with actor Lennie James on the television series Jericho. An expert in teaching American dialects to Europeans, he also worked with German actress Diane Kruger on National Treasure 2 and with Irish actress Polly Walker on the CBS series Cane, and with Lena Heady on Terminator: The Sarah Connor Chronicles.
