= James Chandler (actor) =

American actor (1922–1988)

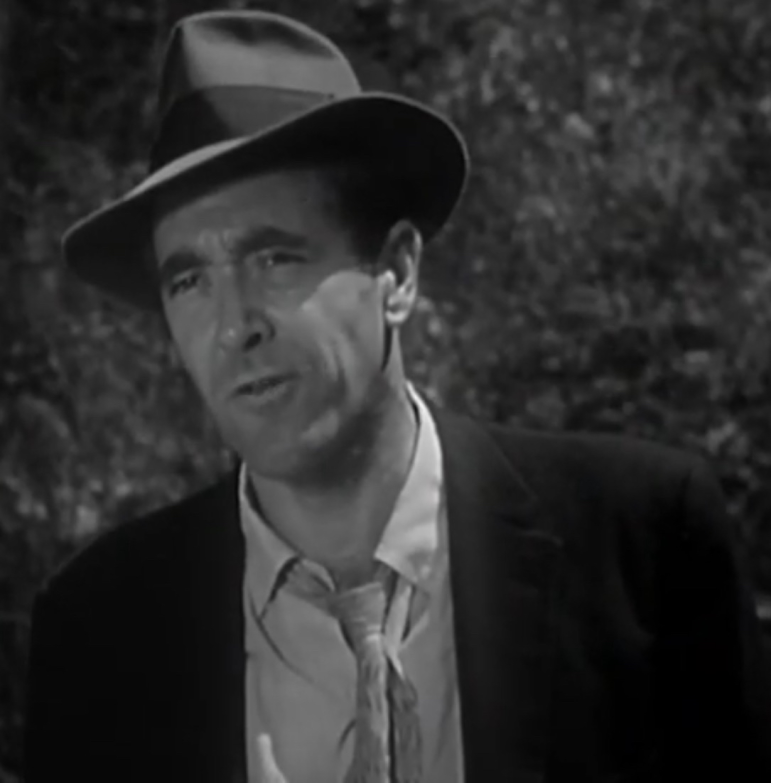
- Chandler in Man with a Camera, 1958
- Born: James Thornton Chandler; May 8, 1922; San Francisco, California, U.S.
- Died: June 14, 1988 (aged 66); San Francisco, California, U.S.
- Occupations: Film, stage and television actor

James Thornton Chandler (May 8, 1922 – June 14, 1988) was an American film, stage and television actor.

== Life and career ==
Chandler was born in San Francisco, California, the son of Ralph and Gwen Chandler. He began his stage career in the 1940s, appearing in such stage plays as Thunder Rock and Our Town. He then began his screen career in 1952, appearing in the NBC crime anthology television series Gangbusters. The next year, he appeared in the CBS anthology television series The Web.

Later in his career, in 1957, Chandler starred as Sergeant Reagan in the syndicated police thriller television series The Tracer. After the series ended in 1958, he played the recurring role of Lt. Gerard in the ABC private detective television series Bourbon Street Beat. He guest-starred in numerous television programs including Gunsmoke, Bonanza, The Guns of Will Sonnett, Mannix, Perry Mason, Barnaby Jones, Outlaws, Mission: Impossible, Tales of Wells Fargo and Cimarron Strip. He also appeared in films such as The Young Captives (as Tony), Sweet Bird of Youth, Heaven with a Gun, Don't Knock the Twist and Billy Rose's Jumbo.

Chandler retired from acting in 1983, last appearing in the CBC children's television series The Kids of Degrassi Street.

== Death ==
Chandler died on June 14, 1988, of lung cancer at his home in San Francisco, California, at the age of 66.
