= Confidential File =

American TV interview and documentary series (1955–1957)

- Created by: Paul Coates
- Written by: Paul Coates; Andrew J. Fenady
- Directed by: Irvin Kershner; Ben Pivar
- Presented by: Paul Coates
- Country of origin: United States
- Original language: English
- No. of seasons: 2
- No. of episodes: 39

Production
- Production company: Guild Films

Original release
- Release: 1955 – 1957

Confidential File is an American syndicated television interview and documentary series of 39 episodes that began in 1955 and ran through 1957.

== Overview ==
Confidential File began as a local series by Paul Coates on KTTV-TV in Los Angeles on August 27, 1953. By February 1955 it had become the most popular local program in Southern California, and in 1955 the show won a local Emmy Award as Best Cultural Program. It was expanded nationally via syndication beginning in December 1954. The concept came about after Coates and producer James Peck produced two scripts for Dragnet. The realistic approach of that series led Coates to consider "Why not use actual people? And, instead of just crime, bring all phases of life to the TV screen."

Coates narrated the series. Episodes featured interviews and dramatic segments related to crime, show business, and other topics. The first half of a typical episode was used to dramatize a problem that a community might face. In the second half, interviews provided personal perspectives related to that problem. People who were interviewed sometimes wore masks to prevent embarrassment to themselves and their families. Coates took a non-critical approach in each episode. He said, "I promised that, in doing File, I would never have the right at any time to be the authority. I don't attempt to give advice, even in areas where I know good and well what I'm talking about. I'm strictly a reporter."

Episodes typically combined a tabloid-style of reporting with a serious approach to the topic. Coates acknowledged that much of the program's content was sensational, but he pointed out that the staff had received "an unprecedented amount of cooperation" from the California Department of Mental Hygiene, the U. S. Public Health Service, The U. S. Pure Food and Drug Administration and local police and judges because the treatment of sensitive topics was "valuable and even educational".

=== Effects ===
A screening of an episode of Confidential File led to passage of legislation by the New York State Assembly in March 1955. Assemblyman James A. FitzPatrick arranged the screening, which was attended by 125 members of the Assembly. The next day the Assembly unanimously passed a bill that prohibited sale of horror and sexually oriented comic books to minors.

The National Association of Mental Health and parent-teacher associations from some localities awarded certificates of approval to Confidential File, and at least 200 civic groups requested private screenings of episodes on particular topics.

After one of the early episodes, which focused on narcotics addiction, a young addict in New York who had seen the show called police and gave addresses of two apartments from which drugs were dealt. Police raided the places and arrested three suspects.

Some segments that exposed illegal activity led to threats to Coates and his family. As a result, he bought a gun and installed a burglar alarm system in his home. Los Angeles police once had a guard at his home for 24 hours.

=== Recognition ===
Confidential File came in second in the Best Documentary, Commentary, or Instructional Series category among syndicated programs in Billboard magazine's Fourth Annual TV Program and Talent Awards. It was called "a pioneer for its introduction of many subjects which formerly were taboo on TV."

== Episodes ==
Partial List of Episodes of Confidential File
Topic	Comments
Charity rackets	Showed confidence men in a "boiler room" making solicitation telephone calls.
Child molesters.	Perspectives presented included those of doctors, parents, and teachers. A molester revealed "how he got that way" and his hopes for being cured.
Crooked private detectives	Showed private investigators (accompanied by "an aggrieved husband or wife") breaking in on "an errant couple" and taking pictures for use in court. In an interview an attractive woman said that she earned $250 for picking up men in hotel lobbies and accompanying them to hotel rooms, so that the detectives could break in and take photographs. She added that sometimes she had to use sleeping pills on the men, and those times earned her $500.
Horror comic books	In the dramatic segment young adolescent boys gathered in the woods to read and trade comic books. Coates' narration said, in part, "They're reading stories devoted to adultery, to sexual perversion, to horror, to the most despicable of crimes." People intereviewed included boys, a comic-book artist who had drawn some horror comics but disliked that work, and United States Senator Estes Kefauver, who urged parents to cooperate to stir up public opinion against such publications.
Narcotics problem	The episode's dramatic segment showed a teen-age girl going through four phases of narcotics use: smoking marijuana, using heroin, becoming addicted to heroin, and cold-turkey withdrawal. An experienced police officer said that addicts can overcome physical addiction but "never the mental habit"; an addict who was interviewed "tearfully told how she was first 'hooked' by narcotics," relating the time she had spent in prison and her unsuccessful efforts to shake her addiction.
Lysergic acid	Coates interviewed "a man under the influence of a drug that brings on temporary insanity". The man, an artist, demonstrated some of the drug's effects by drawing sketches of Coates while the artist was affected by the drug. One sketch showed a "violent expression" in Coates's eyes, while another "had a Christ-like stained-glass window effect". Meanwhile, the artist (while still under the influence) said that he saw no difference in the sketches.
Teen-age gang violence	Dramatization of "a typical kid-gang killing" preceded an interview with the leader of a Los Angeles gang and Coates's discussion with a nationally known authority on teen-age gangs who headed the juvenile division of the Detroit Police Department.
Treatment of starlets in Hollywood	Study and hard work led to disappointment for "999 out of 1000 girls". Each of two young women cited (one of whom had extensive preparation) had a small part in one film. At the time of the episode, one was earning $30 per week modeling for photographers, and the other was a waitress making $25 per week.

== Production ==
Coates and Peck were the producers. Directors included Irvin Kershner. Guild Films produced the series. Writers included A. J. Fenady. Lawrence Menken was editorial supervisor. The program's staff had 15 people who worked on content of episodes and 27 technicians and camera operators. Production began on December 13, 1954. Content was filmed in Hollywood and in other locations around the United States. Sponsors included Bardahl Oil, which by the end of June 1955 had contracted to sponsor the program on 57 stations for one year.

== Critical response ==
Hal Erickson wrote in his book Syndicated Television: The First Forty Years, 1947-1987, "Paul Coates' sincerity was never in doubt, though he could be a bit priggish, especially when not in full possession of the facts."

A review in the trade publication Motion Picture Daily said that the series shone a "spotlight on various economic, social and moral problems facing the nation today", adding that it "combines dramatic intensity and civic values".

After three episodes had been broadcast, Pete Rahn wrote in the St. Louis Globe-Democrat that the series "is indeed revolutionary". He anticipated that the program "will meet opposition from some quarters" because it "will surely reach into fields which some viewers consider too shady for TV".

Syndicated media critic John Crosby described episodes as "remarkably well photographed and produced. He also wrote, "The subjects — some of them, not all of them — are very much on the side of sensationalism, but the treatment is as restrained as you can get with those subjects."

Sid Shalit, writing in the Daily News, described a drug addict's description of her situation "one of the most tragic sights ever seen on television" but added that overall the topic "was handled constructively and in good taste".
