= Paul Coates =

American print and television journalist (1921–1968)

- Born: March 10, 1921; New York, New York
- Died: November 16, 1968 (aged 47); West Hollywood, California
- Occupations: Television host and columnist
- Years active: 1953 to 1968

Paul V. Coates (March 10, 1921 – November 16, 1968) was an American print and television journalist. He was known for his popular daily newspaper column and as the host of the syndicated tabloid-style television series Confidential File, developed by Coates and Irvin Kershner (1923–2010).

Coates suffered a massive stroke in 1966 which left the right side of his body paralyzed and his speech severely impaired. Initially given a 50% chance of survival, Coates made a recovery in less than a year, regaining his speech and returning to work in April, 1967. However, he died a year later.
