= Branded (TV series) =

American Western television series (1965–1966)

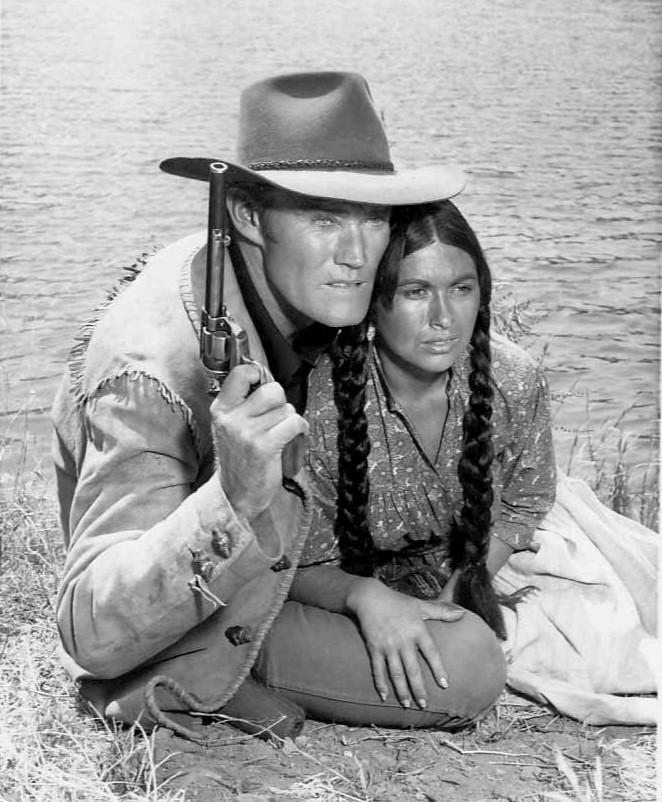
- Connors as Jason McCord and guest star Anna Morrell, 1965
- Genre: Western
- Created by: Larry Cohen
- Starring: Chuck Connors
- Opening theme: "Branded" by Dominic Frontiere and Alan Alch
- Composers: Dominic Frontiere; Richard Markowitz
- Country of origin: United States
- Original language: English
- No. of seasons: 2
- No. of episodes: 48 (13 in black-and-white, 35 in color)

Production
- Executive producer: Harris Katelman
- Producers: Cecil Barker; Andrew J. Fenady
- Production companies: The Branded Company (1965); Goodson-Todman Productions; Sentinel Productions

Original release
- Network: NBC
- Release: January 24, 1965 – April 24, 1966

Branded is an American Western television series that aired on NBC from 1965 through 1966. It was sponsored by Procter & Gamble in its Sunday night, 8:30 p.m. Eastern time period. The series is set in the Old West, following the end of the American Civil War. The show starred Chuck Connors as Jason McCord, a United States Army cavalry captain who had been court-martialed and drummed out of the service following an unjust accusation of cowardice.

== Opening ==
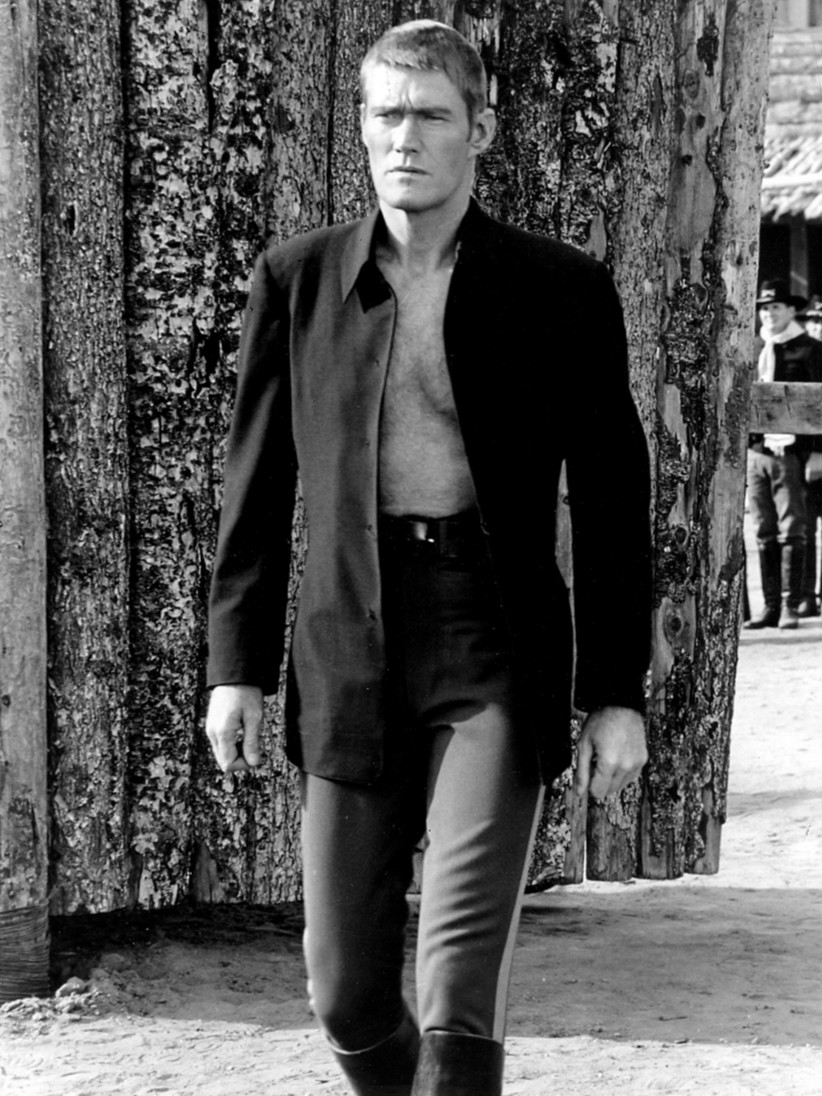
McCord leaving the fort as the gates close behind him

The opening title credits of each episode in the series feature a depiction of McCord's cashiering with the stripping of rank shoulder patches and his Light Cavalry Saber broken in two. McCord retained the handle of his broken saber with attached pommel. He had the remaining blade sharpened into a long knife, which he used in many episodes. McCord is sent out of the fort where this ceremony occurred, and the gates are closed behind him. Although the exact date of McCord's cashiering is never given, events and people depicted in episodes place the events of the series itself as sometime during the first administration of President Ulysses S. Grant (1869–1872) and after William Seward negotiated the Alaska Purchase (1867). The name and location of the fort are also not given.

== Pilot ==
In the pilot episode, "The Vindicator", McCord is confronted by a newspaper reporter (Claude Akins) who wants a follow-up story on the Bitter Creek massacre. McCord refuses to cooperate. He knows that General James Reed, McCord's mentor, was on a peace mission to meet representatives of the Cheyenne nation at Bitter Creek. His unit of 31 men was attacked by a group of renegade Indians known as Dog Soldiers. During the attack, McCord realized that the old general had taken leave of his senses. McCord assumed command, but it was too late. McCord was wounded in the battle and left for dead, the only survivor. He remained in a coma for 10 days after the attack. McCord was later hauled before a court-martial for desertion, convicted and drummed out of the Army.

The reporter tracks down a widow of the Bitter Creek massacre (June Lockhart). Her husband was third in command and had written several letters questioning Reed's mental state. Those letters would have been enough to grant McCord a new trial and possibly exonerate him, but McCord convinced the widow to burn the letters to protect Reed's reputation. McCord feared that if Reed's reputation were damaged, certain people in Washington, DC, would try to start a new war with the Apaches. McCord chose never to speak about what really happened at Bitter Creek.

In the series, McCord traveled through the Old West, continually being confronted by people who refuse to believe his innocence, requiring him to prove them wrong.

== Guest stars ==
John M. Pickard appeared in six episodes as General Phil Sheridan. Other notable guest stars included Chris Alcaide, John Carradine, Dick Clark, Don Collier, Pat Conway, Russ Conway, Alex Cord, Janet De Gore, Dolores del Río, Bruce Dern, Chad Everett, William Harlow, I. Stanford Jolley, Ted Jordan, Martin Landau, June Lockhart, Joel Marston, Burgess Meredith, Greg Morris, Warren Oates, Gregg Palmer, Larry Pennell, Michael Rennie, Burt Reynolds, George Sowards, Jack Tornek, and Lee Van Cleef.

Major League Baseball player Ron Perranoski appeared in a 1965 episode of Branded, while he was a member of the Los Angeles Dodgers. Series star Chuck Connors had played for the Brooklyn Dodgers in 1949.

== Production ==
When the show's creator Larry Cohen pitched the series to NBC, it was immediately accepted without the usual step of producing a pilot episode. It aired between two of NBC's biggest hits, Walt Disney Presents and Bonanza, and in its time slot it competed with The FBI on ABC and The Ed Sullivan Show on CBS. It was co-produced for most of its run by Mark Goodson-Bill Todman Productions (which later folded ultimately into Fremantle), more widely associated with their productions of various game shows, in association with Sentinel Productions. Andrew J. Fenady served as the producer, later executive producer, on the series.

Larry Cohen conceived the series as an allegorical critique of Hollywood blacklisting and McCarthyism, disguised in the classical form of historical western; drawing on the experiences of industry figures whose careers were derailed by unjust accusations, he conceived the show's hero as a "blacklisted cowboy", falsely branded a coward and burdened with a ruined reputation. Midway through the first season, when Cohen explained the show's political subtext to Chuck Connors, a staunch Republican, their previously friendly relationship quickly deteriorated, and by the end of the season Connors had Cohen removed from creative control of the show.

The series followed Chuck Connors's series The Rifleman, but it did not have that show's longevity, lasting only 48 episodes over two seasons. For the first season, 13 episodes were shot in black-and-white; the three-part story "The Mission" was shot in color. The second season of 32 episodes was made entirely in color.

Parts of Branded were filmed at the Kanab movie fort and Kanab Canyon in Utah.

Current distribution rights for Branded are owned by CBS Television Distribution (CBSTD), the successor in interest to KingWorld, who had purchased the original distributor, Leo A. Gutman, Inc., in 1984.

Under Gutman, the show was part of Chuck Connors' Great Western Theatre. That series was originally syndicated internationally by ABC Films, and then Firestone Film Syndication, who later go on to distribute many Goodson-Todman game shows.

Frequently, stations that air Branded have paired it with another Western series, the early Aaron Spelling production The Guns of Will Sonnett starring veteran Western actor Walter Brennan, which is also distributed by CBSTD.

== Theme song ==
The theme song by Dominic Frontiere and Alan Alch contains the lyric: "Branded / Scorned as the one who ran / What do you do when you're branded / And you know you're a man?"

== Episodes ==
=== Season 1 (1965) ===
All episodes in black-and-white except for the three-part episode, "The Mission," which was made in color

No. overall	No. in season	Title	Directed by	Written by	Original release date
1	1	"Survival"	Richard Whorf	Larry Cohen	January 24, 1965
2	2	"The Vindicator"	Joseph H. Lewis	Larry Cohen	January 31, 1965
3	3	"The Test"	Leonard Horn	John Wilder & Jerry Ziegman	February 7, 1965
4	4	"The Rules of the Game"	Lawrence Dobkin	Larry Cohen	February 14, 1965
5	5	"The Bounty"	Harry Harris	Larry Cohen	February 21, 1965
6	6	"Leap Upon Mountains..."	Harry Harris	Andrew J. Fenady	February 28, 1965
7	7	"Coward Step Aside"	Harry Harris	Story by : Larry Cohen; Teleplay by : John Wilder & Jerry Ziegman	March 7, 1965
Guest star: Johnny Crawford, Connors's co-star from their earlier series, The Rifleman
8	8	"The Mission" (Note: Broadcast in color) (Note: Parts One, Two and Three of the color episode "The Mission" were later released as a movie titled Broken Sabre, with new footage. According to Western Clippings, the re-edited movie version ends with Jason "regaining his commission and resuming his army career," thus giving an ending to the series. It also ends with Jason asking a woman to marry him and she says yes. The movie was released to theaters in 1965.)	Bernard McEveety	Story by : Larry Cohen; Teleplay by : Jameson Brewer	March 14, 1965
9	9	"The Mission"	Bernard McEveety	Story by : Larry Cohen; Teleplay by : Jameson Brewer	March 21, 1965
10	10	"The Mission"	Allen Reisner	Frank Chase	March 28, 1965
11	11	"The First Kill"	Alex March	Frank Chase	April 4, 1965
12	12	"Very Few Heroes"	Bernard McEveety	John Wilder & Jerry Ziegman	April 11, 1965
13	13	"One Way Out"	Bernard McEveety	Jameson Brewer	April 18, 1965
14	14	"That the Brave Endure"	Ron Winston	Story by : Michael Dunn; Teleplay by : Michael Dunn & John Wilder & Jerry Ziegman	April 25, 1965
15	15	"Taste of Poison"	Ron Winston	Story by : Larry Cohen; Teleplay by : William Putnam & Nicholas Rowe	May 2, 1965
16	16	"Price of a Name"	Leonard Horn	Story by : Larry Cohen; Teleplay by : Nicholas Rowe	May 23, 1965

=== Season 2 (1965–66) ===
All episodes in color

No. overall	No. in season	Title	Directed by	Written by	Original release date
17	1	"Judge Not"	Vincent McEveety	Jerome B. Thomas	September 12, 1965
18	2	"Now Join the Human Race"	Harry Harris	Ken Pettus	September 19, 1965
19	3	"Mightier Than the Sword"	Vincent McEveety	Frank Chase	September 26, 1965
20	4	"I Killed Jason McCord"	Larry Peerce	Joseph Hoffman	October 3, 1965
21	5	"The Bar Sinister"	Larry Peerce	Jack Paritz	October 10, 1965
22	6	"Seward's Folly"	Larry Peerce	George W. Schenck & William Marks	October 17, 1965
23	7	"Salute the Soldier Briefly"	Lee H. Katzin	Frederick Louis Fox	October 24, 1965
24	8	"The Richest Man in Boot Hill"	Larry Peerce	Elon Packard	October 31, 1965
25	9	"Fill No Glass For Me"	Vincent McEveety	Frederick Louis Fox	November 7, 1965
26	10	"Fill No Glass For Me"	Vincent McEveety	Frederick Louis Fox	November 14, 1965
27	11	"The Greatest Coward on Earth"	Lee H. Katzin	Nathaniel Tanchuck	November 21, 1965
28	12	"$10,000 for Durango"	Larry Peerce	Jerome B. Thomas	November 28, 1965
29	13	"Romany Roundup"	Lee H. Katzin	Story by : Lou Shaw; Teleplay by : Lou Shaw & Jameson Brewer	December 5, 1965
30	14	"Romany Roundup"	Lee H. Katzin	Story by : Lou Shaw; Teleplay by : Lou Shaw & Jameson Brewer	December 12, 1965
31	15	"A Proud Town"	Larry Peerce	Paul L. Freedman	December 19, 1965
32	16	"The Golden Fleece"	Lee H. Katzin	Jay Selby & Jessica Benson	January 2, 1966
33	17	"The Wolfers"	Larry Peerce	Frank Paris	January 9, 1966
34	18	"This Stage of Fools"	Lee H. Katzin	Ken Trevey	January 16, 1966
35	19	"A Destiny Which Made Us Brothers"	Allen Reisner	Andrew J. Fenady	January 23, 1966
36	20	"McCord's Way"	William Witney	Borden Chase	January 30, 1966
37	21	"Nice Day for a Hanging"	Allen Reisner	Frank Chase	February 6, 1966
38	22	"Barbed Wire"	Harry Harris	Ken Trevey	February 13, 1966
39	23	"Yellow for Courage"	Harry Harris	Frederick Louis Fox	February 20, 1966
40	24	"Call to Glory"	Allen Reisner	John Wilder & Jerry Ziegman	February 27, 1966
41	25	"Call to Glory"	Allen Reisner	John Wilder & Jerry Ziegman	March 6, 1966
42	26	"Call to Glory"	Allen Reisner	John Wilder & Jerry Ziegman	March 13, 1966
43	27	"The Ghost of Murietta"	William Witney	Frank Paris	March 20, 1966
44	28	"The Assassins"	William Witney	Jameson Brewer	March 27, 1966
45	29	"The Assassins"	William Witney	Jameson Brewer	April 3, 1966
46	30	"Headed for Doomsday"	Edward Ludwig	Peter Barry	April 10, 1966
47	31	"Cowards Die Many Times"	Bernard McEveety	Frank Chase	April 17, 1966
48	32	"Kellie"	Marc Daniels	Frank Chase	April 24, 1966

== Home media ==
Timeless Media Group released both seasons of Branded on DVD in Region 1 in 2004–2005. Season 1 was released on August 3, 2004, and season 2 was released on February 8, 2005. On February 16, 2010, Timeless Media Group released Branded: The Complete Series, a six-disc box set featuring all 48 episodes of the series and several bonus features. More-recent prints cut for syndication are used for the set, and as a result, three minutes are missing from each episode. Broken Saber (the film re-editing of "The Mission Parts One, Two, And Three") is not included.

== Merchandise ==
A tie-in board game called Branded Game was released by Milton Bradley in 1966.

== Impact on popular culture ==
Branded is referenced in the Coen Brothers 1998 film, The Big Lebowski. The Dude (Jeff Bridges) and Walter Sobchak (John Goodman) have tracked down a teenager named Larry Sellers to his home, believing the boy stole money from a ransom package they were to deliver. Walter has learned that Sellers's father is Arthur Digby Sellers, who must live in an iron lung, and that the older Sellers wrote 156 episodes of Branded (more than the actual show ever aired). Upon entering the house and seeing the older Sellers in an iron lung, Walter acts with uncharacteristic humility and respect, in large part because of the reverence in which he holds Branded; before exploding into misdirected violence against a stranger's car after an obscene interrogation of Larry fails to elicit any response from the affectless boy.

== See also ==
- The Fugitive (1963 TV series)
