= Irvin Kershner =

American film director (1923–2010)

- Born: Isadore Kershner; April 29, 1923; Philadelphia, Pennsylvania, U.S.
- Died: November 27, 2010 (aged 87); Los Angeles, California, U.S.
- Education: University of Southern California
- Occupations: Film director; producer; actor
- Years active: 1952–2009
- Children: 2

Irvin Kershner (born Isadore Kershner; April 29, 1923 – November 27, 2010) was an American director for film and television. Early in his career as a filmmaker he directed quirky, independent drama films, while working as a lecturer at the University of Southern California. Later, he began making high-budget blockbusters such as The Empire Strikes Back, the James Bond adaptation Never Say Never Again and RoboCop 2. Through the course of his career, he received numerous accolades, including being nominated for both a Primetime Emmy Award and a Palme d'Or.

== Early life ==
Irvin Kershner was born in Philadelphia, to Ukrainian-Jewish parents. His artistic and cultural background was a mixture of music and art. The study of music (violin, viola and composition) was the most important activity of his early years. He attended Temple University's Tyler School of Fine Arts in Philadelphia. Later, he went to New York and Provincetown to study with the famous painting teacher Hans Hofmann. He then moved to Los Angeles where he studied photography at the Art Center College of Design.

During World War II, Kershner served three years with the U.S. Eighth Air Force as a flight engineer. He later began his film career at the University of Southern California School of Cinematic Arts, teaching photography and taking cinema courses under Slavko Vorkapić, a montage artist and then-dean of the School. Kershner then accepted a job as still photographer on a State Department film project in Iran under the Point Four Program, which ultimately led to an assignment as a director and cinematographer of documentaries in Iran, Greece and Turkey with the United States Information Service.

== Career ==
When he returned to the States, he and Paul Coates developed Confidential File, a documentary television series. Kershner worked as writer, director, cinematographer and editor. He later developed and directed the television series The Rebel (1959–61), as well as the pilots for Peyton Place, Cain's Hundred, Philip Marlowe, and others.

He then moved on to feature films, including: The Hoodlum Priest (which starred Don Murray); The Luck of Ginger Coffey (with Robert Shaw and Mary Ure); A Fine Madness (with Sean Connery, Joanne Woodward, and Jean Seberg); The Flim-Flam Man (starring Michael Sarrazin, George C. Scott and Sue Lyon); Loving (with George Segal and Eva Marie Saint); Up the Sandbox (with Barbra Streisand); The Return of a Man Called Horse (starring Richard Harris); the critically acclaimed TV movie Raid on Entebbe (a true-life drama which was nominated for nine Emmys, including Best Direction); and the supernatural thriller Eyes of Laura Mars (starring Faye Dunaway and Tommy Lee Jones).

Kershner was the son of Jewish immigrants. He considered himself an internationalist, saying: "I've been a student of Christianity. I've been interested in the historical basis of the Muslim religion. I studied Buddhism. I don't think of myself as a Jew except by birth, as I don't follow the customs. I'm a Jew because other people consider me so. My pride is in being international."

=== The Empire Strikes Back ===
Kershner directed The Empire Strikes Back (1980), the sequel of the 1977 hit film Star Wars. Writer-producer George Lucas knew Kershner as a teacher in the film program at USC School of Cinematic Arts. Kershner was a surprising choice in directing the film. According to Kershner himself, he once asked Lucas: "Of all the younger guys around, all the hot-shots, why me?" Lucas replied: "Well, because you know everything a Hollywood director is supposed to know, but you're not Hollywood."

Kershner, who was an appealing directorial candidate to Lucas because of his concern for character development, was at first reluctant to direct the film. When asked by Lucas to work on the project over lunch, Kershner refused. Kershner's agent was told about the meeting and encouraged him to take the job. Kershner later discussed his motivations: "I was grabbed by the fairytale which Lucas invented and wanted to be part of keeping it alive." Of his cinematic style, Kershner has said: "I like to fill up the frame with the characters' faces. There's nothing more interesting than the landscape of the human face".

Kershner turned down a chance to direct Return of the Jedi (1983), having spent almost three years of work on The Empire Strikes Back. Richard Marquand was eventually chosen to direct the third film in the original trilogy. Kershner stated, in retrospect, that he would have accepted an offer to direct one of the films of the Star Wars prequel trilogy had they been produced sooner, as Lucas originally estimated the first of them to be ready for release in 1988 rather than in 1999.

=== Later work ===
Kershner had projects with which he was going to be involved in the late 1970s and early 1980s. He signed on to direct an adaptation of I, Robot from a script by Harlan Ellison, which was never filmed. Later, he was initially hired by producers Richard Zanuck and David Brown to direct an adaptation of Eric Van Lustbader's novel The Ninja from scripts by W.D. Richter and Tom Cole, but the project was cancelled following months of pre-production.

After Empire Strikes Back, Kershner directed Never Say Never Again (Sean Connery's return to the role of James Bond), the HBO film Traveling Man (starring John Lithgow and Jonathan Silverman, this film earned Kershner an ACE Award nomination), and RoboCop 2. He also directed the pilot of the television series seaQuest DSV, and he made his debut as an actor in the Martin Scorsese film The Last Temptation of Christ (1988), in which he played Zebedee, the father of the apostles James and John. He played a film director in Steven Seagal's On Deadly Ground. He was a faculty member at the Master of Professional Writing Program at the University of Southern California. In 2000, he was a member of the jury at the 22nd Moscow International Film Festival.

In fall 2002, spring 2003, fall 2004, and spring 2004, Kershner served as a Visiting Professor and Research Associate at the Maryland Institute for Technology in the Humanities (MITH) at the University of Maryland, College Park, where he also provided cinematography training. He and the founding director Martha Nell Smith remained close and he served as her advisor until the end of his life.

== Death ==
Kershner died on November 27, 2010, at his home in Los Angeles, after suffering from lung cancer for three and a half years. Kershner had been working on photographic projects before his death. He was looked after by his two sons, David and Dana.

== Filmography ==
=== Film ===
==== As director ====
Year	Title	Notes
1958	Stakeout on Dope Street	Also screenwriter
1959	The Young Captives	
1961	The Hoodlum Priest	OCIC Award; Nominated- Palme d'Or
1963	Face in the Rain	
1964	The Luck of Ginger Coffey	
1966	A Fine Madness	
1967	The Flim-Flam Man	
1970	Loving	
1972	Up the Sandbox	
1974	S*P*Y*S	
1976	The Return of a Man Called Horse	
1978	Eyes of Laura Mars	
1980	The Empire Strikes Back	Saturn Award for Best Director; Hugo Award for Best Dramatic Presentation
1983	Never Say Never Again	
1990	RoboCop 2	

==== As actor ====
Year	Title	Role	Director	Notes
1988	The Last Temptation of Christ	Zebedee	Martin Scorsese	
1990	RoboCop 2	Gerber	Himself	Uncredited
1994	On Deadly Ground	Walters	Steven Seagal	
1995	Angus	Mr. Stoff	Patrick Read Johnson	
2003	Manhood	Gentleman	Bobby Roth	
2005	Berkeley	Statistics Professor	Bobby Roth	Final film role

==== As producer ====
Year	Title	Director	Notes
1988	Wildfire	Zalman King	Executive
1997	American Perfekt	Paul Chart	
2009	The Lost Tribe	Roel Reiné	Executive

=== Television director ===
Year	Title	Notes
1955	Confidential File	Episode: "Horror Comic Books"
1959	Now Is Tomorrow	Television film
1959–61	The Rebel	35 episodes
1961	Cain's Hundred	Episode: "Degrees of Guilt"
1961	Ben Casey	Episode: "My Good Friend Krikor"
1962–1963	Naked City	2 episodes
1963	Kraft Suspense Theatre	Episode: "The End of the World, Baby"
1977	Raid on Entebbe	Television film Nominated- Primetime Emmy Award for Outstanding Directing in a Special Program
1986	Amazing Stories	Episode: "Hell Toupee"
1989	Traveling Man	Television film
1993	SeaQuest DSV	Episode: "To Be or Not to Be"

== Bibliography ==
- 1980: Alan Arnold: A Journal of the Making of The Empire Strikes Back (contributor). ISBN 0-345-29075-5.
- 1997: Laurent Bouzereau: Star Wars. The Annotated Screenplays. (contributor) ISBN 0-345-40981-7.

== Awards and nominations ==
- Winner, Lifetime Career Award – Saturn Awards (2010)
- Winner, Director of Achievement – Fort Lauderdale International Film Festival (2002)
- Winner, Best Director, The Empire Strikes Back – Saturn Awards (1980)
- Winner, Best Dramatic Presentation, The Empire Strikes Back – Hugo Awards (1980)
- Nominee, Best Director, Special Program-Drama, Raid on Entebbe – Emmy Awards (1976)
- Winner, OCIC Award, The Hoodlum Priest – Cannes Film Festival (1961)
- Nominee, Palme d'Or, The Hoodlum Priest – Cannes Film Festival (1961)
