= Bonanza season 11 =

Bonanza
- Season 11
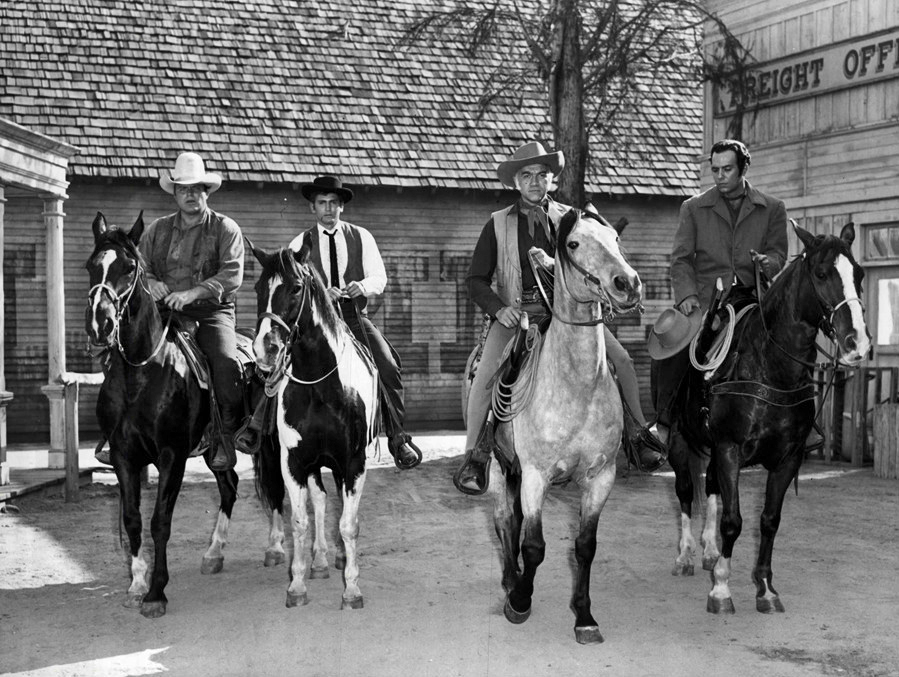
- Cast of Bonanza in 1959
- Starring: Lorne Greene; Dan Blocker; Michael Landon
- No. of episodes: 28

Release
- Original network: NBC
- Original release: September 14, 1969 – April 19, 1970

Season chronology
- ← Previous; Season 10 Next → Season 12

The eleventh season of the American Western television series Bonanza premiered on NBC on September 14, 1969, with the final episode airing April 19, 1970. The series was developed and produced by David Dortort. Season eleven starred Lorne Greene, Dan Blocker, and Michael Landon. The season consisted of 28 episodes of a series total 431 hour-long episodes, the entirety of which was produced in color. Season eleven was aired on Sundays at 9:00 p.m. It was #3 in the Nielsen ratings, behind #2 Gunsmoke.

== Synopsis ==
Bonanza is set around the Ponderosa Ranch near Virginia City, Nevada and chronicles the weekly adventures of the Cartwright family, consisting of Ben Cartwright (Lorne Greene) and his three sons (each by a different wife), Adam (Pernell Roberts), Eric "Hoss" (Dan Blocker), and Joseph (Michael Landon). Veteran actor Victor Sen Yung played the ranch cook, Hop Sing. In 1964, Pernell Roberts began expressing a desire to leave the series, and so prospective replacements were introduced via Barry Coe as Little Joe's wayward maternal half-brother Clay, and Guy Williams as Ben's nephew Will Cartwright. However, Roberts was persuaded to complete his contract, and remained through season six. The characters of Clay and Will were discontinued. In the ninth season, David Canary was added to the cast as ranch hand/foreman Candy Canady.

== Cast and characters ==
=== Main cast ===
- Lorne Greene as Ben Cartwright
- Dan Blocker as Eric "Hoss" Cartwright
- Michael Landon as Joseph "Little Joe" Cartwright
- David Canary as "Candy" Canaday

=== Recurring ===
- Victor Sen Yung as Hop Sing
- Ray Teal as Sheriff Roy Coffee
- Bing Russell as Deputy Clem Foster
- Lou Frizzell as Dusty Rhodes

=== Guest cast ===
- John Astin
- Tom Bosley
- Richard Bull
- David Cassidy
- Christopher Connelly
- Michael Dunn
- Jo Van Fleet
- Steve Forrest
- Lynn Guzman
- Mariette Hartley
- Arthur Hunnicutt
- Sally Kellerman
- Robert Lansing
- Ann Prentiss
- Dean Stockwell
- Ralph Waite
- Gregory Walcott

== Episodes ==
Bonanza, season 11 episodes
| No. overall | No. in season | Title | Directed by | Written by | Original release date |
|---|---|---|---|---|---|
| 334 | 1 | "Another Windmill to Go" | James B. Clark | Story by : Palmer Thompson; Teleplay by : Palmer Thompson | September 14, 1969 |
The wording of an old law may cause Ben to lose the Ponderosa to an odd man who crossed it in a horse-drawn rowboat.
| 335 | 2 | "The Witness" | Don Richardson | Joel Murcott | September 21, 1969 |
A young woman named Jenny Winters claims to have witnessed a stagecoach robbery.
| 336 | 3 | "The Silence at Stillwater" | Joseph Lejtes | Preston Wood | September 28, 1969 |
Candy is accused of a string of serious crimes, including murder, robbery and arson in Stillwater.
| 337 | 4 | "A Lawman's Lot is Not a Happy One" | Don Richardson | Vincent Wright | October 5, 1969 |
When Sheriff Roy Coffee and Ben are subpoenaed to testify in a land sharking trial in San Francisco, Hoss is appointed the acting sheriff of Virginia City. Hoss soon finds plenty of trouble on his hands, namely dealing with reluctant bridegroom Hiram Peabody (Tom Bosley), who wants to get arrested so as to avoid an impending marriage to an undesirable woman (who has been his pen pal and whom he has never met in person). He also must deal with a smooth-talking salesman who plans to sell shares in a planned resort in Virginia City.
| 338 | 5 | "Anatomy of a Lynching" | William Wiard | Preston Wood | October 12, 1969 |
Will Griner is acquitted of a murder after two key witnesses disappeared before the trial. When a bloodthirsty lynch mob comes after him, thinking him to have silenced the witnesses, Griner goes to the Cartwrights for help.
| 339 | 6 | "To Stop a War" | Leon Benson | Carey Wilber | October 19, 1969 |
Joe's old friend, Dan Logan (Steve Forrest), is hired as a range detective to stop a cattle rustling outbreak. Richard Bull guest stars.
| 340 | 7 | "The Medal" | Lewis Allen | Frank Chase | October 26, 1969 |
Ben offers moral support to Congressional Medal of Honor recipient Matthew Rush (Dean Stockwell).
| 341 | 8 | "The Stalker" | Robert L. Friend | D. C. Fontana | November 2, 1969 |
After Candy shoots and kills armed robber James Campbell in self defense, he learns that he left behind his widow, Lisa, and young son.
| 342 | 9 | "Meena" | Herschel Daugherty | Jack B. Sowards | November 16, 1969 |
Joe and Candy compete for the attention of pretty Miss Meena Calhoun (Ann Prentiss).
| 342 | 10 | "A Darker Shadow" | Don Richardson | John Hawkins, Jonathon Knopf | November 23, 1969 |
Joe's friend Wade Turner (Gregory Walcott), a storekeeper who is engaged and has been offered a promotion at work, tries to deal with a devastating brain tumor that leaves him with a paralyzing sensitivity to bright light and will soon render him blind.
| 343 | 11 | "Dead Wrong" | Michael Landon | Michael Landon | December 7, 1969 |
Hoss and Candy stop at the Sunville saloon where they meet Salty Hubbard (Arthur Hunnicutt).
| 345 | 12 | "Old Friends" | Leon Benson | Barney Slater | December 14, 1969 |
Two men whom Ben once worked with during a gold claim arrive in Virginia City ... on opposite sides of the law.
| 346 | 13 | "Abner Willoughby's Return" | Herschel Daugherty | Jack B. Sowards | December 21, 1969 |
While returning home from a horse-buying trip, Joe is met by old seafaring friend Abner Willoughby (John Astin), who has returned to Nevada to find a stash of gold he hid 17 years earlier in Glory Hole.
| 347 | 14 | "It's a Small World" | Michael Landon | Michael Landon | January 4, 1970 |
Circus midget and new widower George Marshall (Michael Dunn) struggles to deal with the prejudice of Mr. Flynt, the town's banker, when he refuses to hire him despite Ben's recommendation all while trying to support his baby (Lynn Guzman).
| 348 | 15 | "Danger Road" | William F. Claxton | Milton S. Gelman | January 11, 1970 |
Ben needs to transport three large timber beams but the local freight company won't do it. When a new independent freight hauler is approached for the job, Ben recognizes "Gunny" Riley (Robert Lansing), a former soldier in the Mexican war, but on the opposite side.
| 349 | 16 | "The Big Jackpot" | Herschel Daugherty | John Hawkins | January 18, 1970 |
Candy quits his job at the Ponderosa after inheriting a fortune from an old Indian friend. He takes a job as vice president of a land promotion firm, unaware that the president is defrauding customers.
| 350 | 17 | "The Trouble with Amy" | Leon Benson | Jack Miller, John Hawkins | January 25, 1970 |
Ben comes to the aid of Amy Wilder (Jo Van Fleet), an eccentric old woman and animal hoarder, when a scheming neighbor wants her declared incompetent so he can purchase her home and property.
| 351 | 18 | "The Lady and the Mark" | Leon Benson | Preston Wood | February 1, 1970 |
Former Ponderosa ranch hand Chris Keller (Christopher Connelly) seeks refuge at his old workplace after con artists stalk him for his $67,000 fortune. Ralph Waite guest stars.
| 352 | 19 | "Is There Any Man Here" | Don Richardson | B. W. Sandefur | February 8, 1970 |
The daughter of Ben's friend Harry Carlisle, Jennifer (Mariette Hartley), develops a huge crush for the Cartwright patriarch. Ben notes that Jennifer is the same age as oldest son Adam, but that doesn't matter. It soon does matter when Jennifer's ex-fiancé, a wealthy banker from San Francisco, shows up demanding to take her back ... or else it will be the end of the Ponderosa.
| 353 | 20 | "The Law and Billy Burgess" | William F. Claxton | Stanley Roberts | February 15, 1970 |
A new school is opened in Virginia City, and one of the students is an angry teen-aged boy named Billy Burgess (David Cassidy). After a difficult day at school, Billy angrily wishes that his teacher would die. Sure enough, the teacher is found murdered and Billy is fingered as the suspect.
| 354 | 21 | "Long Way to Ogden" | Lewis Allen | Joel Murcott | February 22, 1970 |
A ruthless meat packer named Emit Whitney schemes to monopolize the local cattle industry by buying the rail line that is used to transport the cattle to market.
| 355 | 22 | "Return Engagement" | Don Richardson | Stanley Roberts | March 1, 1970 |
Eleven years after her last stop in Virginia City caused trouble for a young Joe Cartwright, actress Lotta Crabtree (Sally Kellerman) returns for another engagement in the Nevada town. This time, it's Hoss who finds himself in the thick of a murder case.
| 356 | 23 | "The Gold Mine" | Leon Benson | Preston Wood, Robert Bruckner | March 8, 1970 |
Joe helps a young Mexican boy who has suffered from years of abuse by two sadistic slave owners who now want the lad's gold claim and will do anything to get it.
| 357 | 24 | "Decision at Los Robles" | Michael Landon | Michael Landon | March 22, 1970 |
While in Los Robles, Mexico, Ben is critically wounded by the town's cruel boss, John Walker. Ben manages to shoot and kill Walker, but now his son - the spitting image of his father - is hellbent on revenge.
| 358 | 25 | "Caution, Easter Bunny Crossing" | Bruce Bilson | Larry Markes | March 29, 1970 |
In the series' only Easter-themed episode, a Quaker woman convinces Hoss to pose as the Easter bunny for the orphanage. While wearing a rabbit costume, Hoss must try to foil the efforts of a bumbling gang that is plotting to loot the Wells Fargo coach.
| 359 | 26 | "The Horse Traders" | Herschel Daugherty | Jack B. Sowards | April 5, 1970 |
Meena Calhoun has gotten engaged to bumbling outlaw Virgil Potts, who is now trying to make an honest living in the livery business. Virgil soon finds himself in a heated rivalry with Joe, Hoss, and new friend Dusty, who have opened up a stable of their own.
| 360 | 27 | "What are Pardners For?" | William F. Claxton | Jack B. Sowards | April 12, 1970 |
A pair of Easterners have read tall tales about the Wild West and come to Virginia City to live out their dream - be bank robbers in the tradition of their heroes. Hoss somehow becomes involved with their adventures.
| 361 | 28 | "A Matter of Circumstance" | William F. Claxton | B. W. Sandefur | April 19, 1970 |
Alone at the Ponderosa while everyone else is away on a cattle drive, Joe suffers a compound fracture in his left arm when kicked by a horse spooked by a severe thunderstorm. Joe fights to stay conscious and treat his wounds.

== Release ==
Season eleven aired on Sundays from 9:00 pm–10:00 pm on NBC.

== Reception ==
Season eleven was number 3 in the Nielsen ratings, coming in behind Gunsmoke at number 2.
