= Bonanza season 10 =

Bonanza
- Season 10
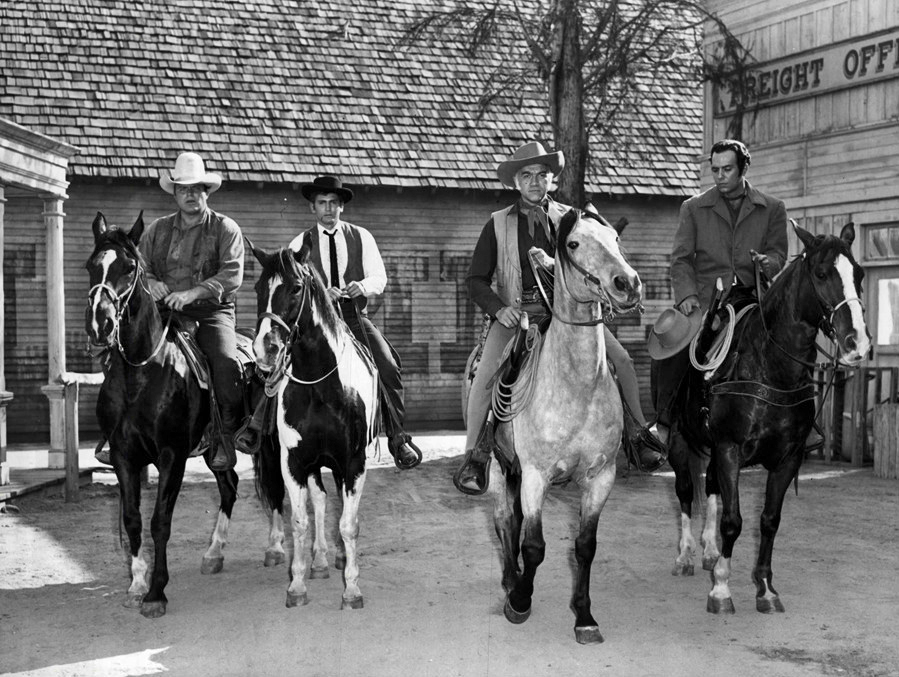
- Cast of Bonanza in 1959
- Starring: Lorne Greene; Dan Blocker; Michael Landon
- No. of episodes: 30

Release
- Original network: NBC
- Original release: September 15, 1968 – May 11, 1969

Season chronology
- ← Previous; Season 9 Next → Season 11

The tenth season of the American Western television series Bonanza premiered on NBC on September 15, 1968, with the final episode airing May 11, 1969. The series was developed and produced by David Dortort. Season ten starred Lorne Greene, Dan Blocker, and Michael Landon. The season consisted of 30 episodes of a series total 431 hour-long episodes, the entirety of which was produced in color. Season ten was aired on Sundays at 9:00 p.m. It was #2 in the Nielsen ratings, the highest rated Western for the season.

== Synopsis ==
Bonanza is set around the Ponderosa Ranch near Virginia City, Nevada and chronicles the weekly adventures of the Cartwright family, consisting of Ben Cartwright (Lorne Greene) and his three sons (each by a different wife), Adam (Pernell Roberts), Eric "Hoss" (Dan Blocker), and Joseph (Michael Landon). Veteran actor Victor Sen Yung played the ranch cook, Hop Sing. In 1964, Pernell Roberts began expressing a desire to leave the series, and so prospective replacements were introduced via Barry Coe as Little Joe's wayward maternal half-brother Clay, and Guy Williams as Ben's nephew Will Cartwright. However, Roberts was persuaded to complete his contract, and remained through season six. The characters of Clay and Will were discontinued. In the ninth season, David Canary was added to the cast as ranch hand/foreman Candy Canady.

== Cast and characters ==
=== Main cast ===
- Lorne Greene as Ben Cartwright
- Dan Blocker as Eric "Hoss" Cartwright
- Michael Landon as Joseph "Little Joe" Cartwright
- David Canary as "Candy" Canaday

=== Recurring ===
- Victor Sen Yung as Hop Sing
- Ray Teal as Sheriff Roy Coffee
- Bing Russell as Deputy Clem Foster

=== Guest cast ===
- Joe Don Baker
- Tom Bosley
- Antoinette Bower
- Wally Cox
- Ossie Davis
- Mary Fickett
- Will Geer
- James Gregory
- Richard Haydn
- Larry Linville
- Mildred Natwick
- James Olson
- Denver Pyle
- Jeremy Slate
- Joan Van Ark

== Episodes ==
Bonanza, season 10 episodes
No. overall	No. in season	Title	Directed by	Written by	Original release date
304	1	"Different Pines, Same Wind"	Leon Benson	Suzanne Clauser	September 15, 1968
Little Joe tries to convince an ailing recluse that she needs to file a legal claim to her remote property to prevent a timber tycoon from logging on her land.
305	2	"Child"	Leon Benson	Jack B. Sowards	September 22, 1968
Hoss, charged with robbery and murder, has to break out of jail in order to escape a lynch mob.
306	3	"Salute to Yesterday"	Leon Benson	John Hawkins	September 29, 1968
Possession of an Army payroll brings danger to the Cartwrights, Candy and a small Army unit, with some of Candy's past coming to light in the process.
307	4	"The Real People of Muddy Creek"	Leon Benson	Alf Harris	October 6, 1968
Ben is left alone with his prisoner (Joe Don Baker) to face a murderous and notorious gang after frightened citizens bail out.
308	5	"The Passing of a King"	Leon Benson	B. W. Sandefur	October 13, 1968
Ben is cheated out of a valuable bull by the son (Jeremy Slate) of one of his old friends (Denver Pyle), a cattle baron who has been declared legally incompetent.
309	6	"The Last Vote"	Joseph Pevney	Robert Vincent Wright	October 20, 1968
Hoss and Little Joe act as campaign managers for opposing mayoral candidates (Tom Bosley and Wally Cox) who are devoted friends.
310	7	"Catch as Catch Can"	Robert L. Friend	David Lang	October 27, 1968
The Cartwrights are accused of being deadbeats in an effort to discredit their good name.
311	8	"Little Girl Lost"	Don Richardson	Michael Fessier	November 3, 1968
The serenity of the Ponderosa is disrupted by a small relative of the Cartwrights, an unruly tomboy (Linda Sue Risk) who's the subject of a custody battle. Antoinette Bower guest stars.
312	9	"The Survivors"	Leon Benson	John Hawkins, Colin MacKenzie, S. H. Barnett	November 10, 1968
A young woman endures scorn when she returns to Virginia City with a child fathered by a Native American after four years of captivity by renegade Indians.
313	10	"The Sound of Drums"	Robert L. Friend	William F. Leicester	November 17, 1968
A stubborn landowner defies his family and neighbors by allowing Native Americans to live on his land.
314	11	"Queen High"	Leon Benson	Michael Fessier	December 1, 1968
Little Joe and Candy win a damaged ore processing mill in a poker game and encounter opposition from their competitor.
315	12	"Yonder Man"	Leo Penn	Milton S. Gelman	December 8, 1968
Ben's reunion with an old friend is marred when he learns that the man is wanted for stealing cattle and political crimes.
316	13	"Mark of Guilt"	Leon Benson	Ward Hawkins, Frank Telford	December 15, 1968
When a rancher that Little Joe fought with is found dead, he's arrested for murder.
317	14	"A World Full of Cannibals"	Gunnar Hellström	Preston Wood	December 22, 1968
Gunmen kidnap Little Joe and offer him in exchange for a grand jury witness.
318	15	"Sweet Annie Laurie"	Don Richardson	Jackson Gillis, John Hawkins, Jess Carneol, Kay Lenard	January 5, 1969
Hoss takes a frightened young wife (Joan Van Ark) to the Ponderosa to protect her from her estranged outlaw husband (James Olson).
319	16	"My Friend, My Enemy"	Leon Benson	Stanley Roberts, Jack B. Sowards	January 12, 1969
Candy has to rely on the testimony of a Native American horse thief to prove his innocence on a murder charge.
320	17	"Mrs. Wharton and the Lesser Breeds"	Leon Benson	Preston Wood	January 19, 1969
A British widow (Mildred Natwick) involves Candy in her plan to recover valuables she lost in a holdup.
321	18	"Erin"	Don Richardson	Sandy Summerhayes	January 26, 1969
Hoss announces his intention to marry a girl (Mary Fickett) who was raised by Native Americans.
322	19	"Company of Forgotten Men"	Leon Benson	Jess Carneol, Kay Lenard	February 2, 1969
A group of retired Army veterans plan to rob a mint with the help of Candy. James Gregory guest stars.
323	20	"The Clarion"	Lewis Allen	John Hawkins, Frank Chase	February 9, 1969
Ben buys a newspaper from a widow and proceeds to launch an exposé of an unscrupulous town boss.
324	21	"The Lady and the Mountain Lion"	Joseph Pevney	Larry Markes	February 23, 1969
A magician (Richard Haydn) plots to involve the Cartwright boys with his identical twin daughters in a swindling plot.
325	22	"Five Candles"	Lewis Allen	Ken Trevey	March 2, 1969
Ben and four companions are trapped in a collapsing courthouse and are forced to rely on an accused murderer for help.
326	23	"The Wish"	Michael Landon	Michael Landon	March 9, 1969
Hoss tries to help a freed slave (Ossie Davis) cope with bigots of a white community.
327	24	"The Deserter"	Leon Benson	B. W. Sandefur, John Dunkel	March 16, 1969
Candy tries to help an army sergeant locate a hidden arms plant.
328	25	"Emily"	Leon Benson	Elliot Gilbert, Preston Wood	March 23, 1969
Hoping to save her broken marriage, a woman accuses Little Joe of theft and trying to run off with her.
329	26	"The Running Man"	Leon Benson	Ward Hawkins	March 30, 1969
Little Joe and Candy try to protect a murder witness. Will Geer guest stars.
330	27	"The Unwanted"	Herschel Daugherty	Thomas Thompson, Suzanne Clauser	April 6, 1969
A marshal's daughter steals her father's money and runs off with an ex-convict.
331	28	"Speak No Evil"	Leon Benson	Norman Katkov, B. W. Sandefur	April 20, 1969
Ben and Hoss mediate a custody battle among relatives of a teenager who inherited a gold mine.
332	29	"The Fence"	Lewis Allen	Ward Hawkins, Milton S. Gelman	April 27, 1969
Ben and Hoss aid an ex-Confederate prison commandant who's being threatened by his former captives. Larry Linville guest stars.
333	30	"A Ride in the Sun"	Leon Benson	John Hawkins, Peter Germano	May 11, 1969
Bank robbers use the Cartwrights as dupes in a plot to loot the Virginia City bank.

== Release ==
Season ten aired on Sundays from 9:00 pm–10:00 pm on NBC.

== Reception ==
It was #2 in the Nielsen ratings, the highest rated Western for the season.
