= Bonanza season 8 =

Bonanza
- Season 8
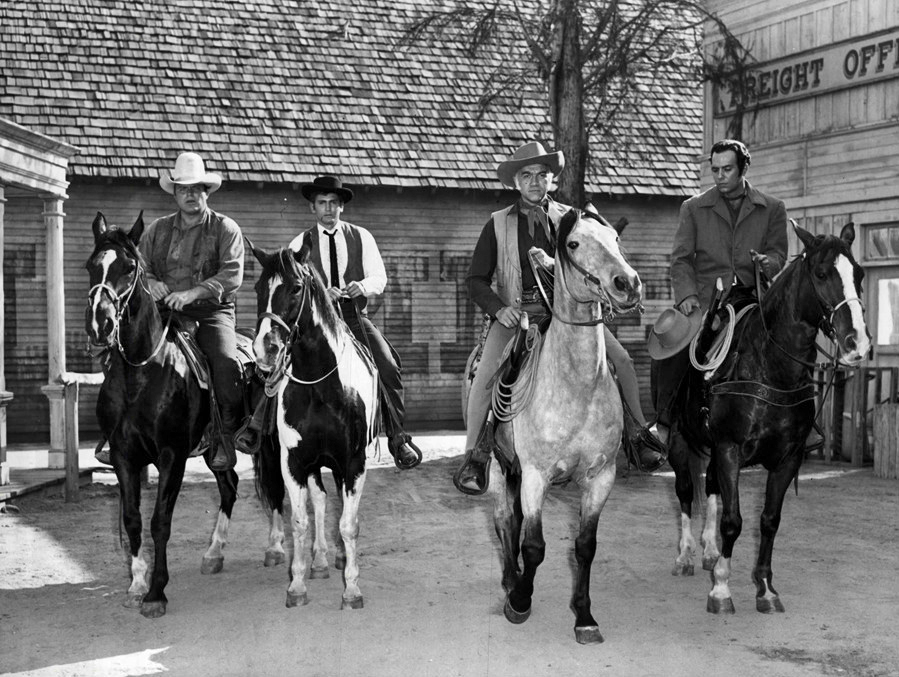
- Cast of Bonanza in 1959
- Starring: Lorne Greene; Dan Blocker; Michael Landon
- No. of episodes: 34

Release
- Original network: NBC
- Original release: September 11, 1966 – May 14, 1967

Season chronology
- ← Previous; Season 7 Next → Season 9

The eighth season of the American Western television series Bonanza premiered on NBC on September 11, 1966, with the final episode airing May 14, 1967. The series was developed and produced by David Dortort. Season eight starred Lorne Greene, Dan Blocker, and Michael Landon. The season consisted of 34 episodes of a series total 431 hour-long episodes, the entirety of which was produced in color. Season eight was aired on Sundays at 9:00 p.m. It was the third straight season the show held the #1 position in the Nielsen ratings.

== Synopsis ==
Bonanza is set around the Ponderosa Ranch near Virginia City, Nevada and chronicles the weekly adventures of the Cartwright family, consisting of Ben Cartwright and his three sons (each by a different wife), Adam, Eric ("Hoss"), and Joseph ("Little Joe"). A regular character is their ranch cook, Hop Sing.

== Cast and characters ==
=== Main cast ===
- Lorne Greene as Ben Cartwright
- Dan Blocker as Eric "Hoss" Cartwright
- Michael Landon as Joseph "Little Joe" Cartwright

=== Recurring ===
- Victor Sen Yung as Hop Sing
- Ray Teal as Sheriff Roy Coffee
- Bing Russell as Deputy Clem Foster

=== Guest cast ===
- Lola Albright
- John Archer
- Diane Baker
- William Bakewell
- Vincent Beck
- Ed Begley
- Shirley Bonne
- Randy Boone
- Beau Bridges
- Paul Brinegar
- Geraldine Brooks
- Harry Carey Jr.
- Phil Chambers
- Chick Chandler
- George Chandler
- Royal Dano
- Henry Darrow
- Roger Davis
- Richard Devon
- Ann Doran
- Richard Eastham
- Jack Elam
- John Ericson
- Richard Evans
- Jason Evers
- Brioni Farrell
- Eric Fleming
- Nina Foch
- Zsa Zsa Gabor
- Dean Harens
- Ron Hayes
- John Ireland
- Chubby Johnson
- Douglas Kennedy
- Jack Kruschen
- Louise Latham
- Joanne Linville
- Lynn Loring
- Ken Lynch
- Nancy Malone
- John McIntire
- Judi Meredith
- Dina Merrill
- Robert Middleton
- Vera Miles
- Mort Mills
- Lois Nettleton
- Wayne Newton
- Leslie Nielsen
- Frank Overton
- Ed Prentiss
- Teddy Quinn
- Paul Richards
- Elizabeth Rogers
- Charles Ruggles
- John Saxon
- Mark Slade
- Warren Stevens
- Clay Tanner
- Dub Taylor
- Vaughn Taylor
- Lurene Tuttle
- Gregory Walcott
- Martin West

== Production ==
=== Filming ===
On location filming for season eight took place at the following:

- Golden Oak Ranch - "Something Hurt, Something Wild", "Horse of a Different Hue", "To Bloom for Thee", "Dark Enough to See the Stars", "Maestro Hoss"
- Lone Pine's Anchor Ranch - "The Pursued"
- Vasquez Rocks - "The Oath"

== Episodes ==
Bonanza, season 8 episodes
No. overall	No. in season	Title	Directed by	Written by	Original release date
236	1	"Something Hurt, Something Wild"	Lewis Allen	Jerry Alderman and William Driskill	September 11, 1966
Laurie Ferguson (Lynn Loring) accuses Joe of assaulting her, setting off a feud between her family and the Cartwrights.
237	2	"Horse of a Different Hue"	William Witney	William R. Cox	September 18, 1966
Ben has no idea that the outcome of a horse race he arranged has been fixed by an old friend of his, Colonel Robert Fairchild (Charles Ruggles).
238	3	"A Time to Step Down"	Paul Henreid	Frank Chase	September 25, 1966
Aging wrangler Dan Tolliver (Ed Begley) turns against the Cartwrights after his longtime friend Ben suggests that he should retire.
239	4	"The Pursued"	William Witney	Story by : Thomas Thompson and Marc Michaels; Teleplay by : Thomas Thompson	October 2, 1966
240	5	"The Pursued"	William Witney	Story by : Thomas Thompson and Marc Michaels; Teleplay by : Thomas Thompson	October 9, 1966
The Cartwrights try to help a Mormon rancher (Eric Fleming) overcome persecution against his beliefs. Eric Fleming, Dina Merrill, Lois Nettleton and Vincent Beck guest star.
241	6	"To Bloom for Thee"	Sutton Roley	June Randolph	October 16, 1966
Hoss proposes marriage to Carol Attley (Geraldine Brooks), a woman with a hidden past which includes having killed her abusive first husband and fleeing from the associated murder charge.
242	7	"Credit for a Kill"	William F. Claxton	Frederick Louis Fox	October 23, 1966
Joe lets his friend Morgan Tanner (Dean Harens) take credit for killing a horse thief, but when the outlaw's brothers come after him to get their revenge he has to make a difficult decision to save his friend's life.
243	8	"Four Sisters from Boston"	Alan Crosland Jr.	John M. Chester	October 30, 1966
Ben tries to stop a con artist from stealing an inheritance from four Boston sisters that are trying to prevent the auctioning of a property left to them by their uncle. Vera Miles guest stars.
244	9	"Old Charlie"	William F. Claxton	Bob and Wanda Duncan	November 6, 1966
Teller of tales Old Charlie Conners (John McIntire) brags about killing an outlaw, so the dead man's brothers seek their revenge.
245	10	"Ballad of the Ponderosa"	William F. Claxton	Story by : Hendrik Vollaerts; Teleplay by : Rik Vollaerts and Michael Landon	November 13, 1966
A balladeer blames Ben for his father's hanging. Randy Boone, Ann Doran, Roger Davis and John Archer guest star.
246	11	"The Oath"	Gerd Oswald	Martha Wilkerson	November 20, 1966
Before his execution for murder, convicted man Big Charlie Monahan (Douglas Kennedy) has his son take an oath to kill the Cartwrights for revenge.
247	12	"A Real Nice, Friendly Little Town"	Herman Hoffman	Herman Hoffman	November 27, 1966
Hoss confronts a woman and her gun-toting sons after Joe is hit by a ricocheting bullet, but the mother seems to be more interested in protecting her kids than seeing justice done. Louise Latham, Mark Slade and Vaughn Taylor guest star.
248	13	"The Bridegroom"	William F. Claxton	Walter Black	December 4, 1966
Joe romances Maggie Dowling (Joanne Linville) so widower Jared Wilson (Ron Hayes) will be jealous enough to ask for her hand in marriage.
249	14	"Tommy"	William Witney	Story by : Mary Terri Taylor and Thomas Thompson; Teleplay by : Mort Thaw and Mary Terri Taylor	December 18, 1966
The Cartwrights protect deaf-mute Tommy Miller (Teddy Quinn) and his mother from his stepfather, a vicious outlaw determined to take back his wife.
250	15	"A Christmas Story"	Gerd Oswald	Thomas Thompson	December 25, 1966
Singer Andy Walker (Wayne Newton) returns to Virginia City for Christmas with his scheming uncle, who plans to make a profit on the orphans' benefit.
251	16	"Ponderosa Explosion"	William F. Claxton	Alex Sharp	January 1, 1967
Joe and Hoss literally get more than they bargained for when a pair of con men lead them to invest in a pair of rabbits that subsequently multiply. Dub Taylor, Chubby Johnson, Chick Chandler and Phil Chambers guest star.
252	17	"Justice"	Lewis Allen	Richard Wendley	January 8, 1967
Joe seeks revenge on the bank clerk who killed his fiancée. Beau Bridges, Lurene Tuttle and Shirley Bonne guest star.
253	18	"A Bride for Buford"	William F. Claxton	Robert V. Barron	January 15, 1967
Hoss is certain that a saloon girl is only interested in a miner for his wealth. Lola Albright, Jack Elam, Paul Brinegar and Richard Devon guest star.
254	19	"Black Friday"	William F. Claxton	Herbert Kastle and John Hawkins	January 22, 1967
Joe tries to save his friend Steven Friday (John Saxon) from dying in a gunfight to avenge one of his victims and planned for Friday the 13th.
255	20	"The Unseen Wound"	Gerd Oswald	Frank Chase	January 29, 1967
Ben tries to help his friend Sheriff Paul Rowan (Leslie Nielsen) after his wife Katherine (Nancy Malone) shows concerns about his health: the Sheriff has been driven to the breaking point by years of violence.
256	21	"Journey to Terror"	Lewis Allen	Joel Murcott	February 5, 1967
After being suspected of being a member of Wade Hollister's (John Ericson) gang, outlaws imprison Little Joe, Tom (Jason Evers) and Ellie Blackwell (Elizabeth Rogers) at the Blackwell farm.
257	22	"Amigo"	William F. Claxton	Story by : Jack Turley; Teleplay by : John Hawkins and Jack Turley	February 12, 1967
Ben helps a wounded comanchero who is being pursued by a lynch mob, a band of terrorists and an angry Little Joe who has just lost a friend. Henry Darrow and Gregory Walcott guest star.
258	23	"A Woman in the House"	Gerd Oswald	Joel Murcott	February 19, 1967
Ben protects a girl from her alcoholic husband, but she's unable to tell gratitude from love. Diane Baker and Paul Richards guest star.
259	24	"Judgement at Red Creek"	William F. Claxton	Robert Sabaroff	February 26, 1967
Joe comes to suspect that a pair of murder suspects is lying because the leader of a posse does not intend to bring them alive. John Ireland, Martin West and Harry Carey Jr. guest star.
260	25	"Joe Cartwright, Detective"	William F. Claxton	Story by : Oliver Crawford; Teleplay by : Michael Landon	March 5, 1967
Joe gets hooked on detective novels and tries to use Scotland Yard techniques to prevent a bank robbery. Mort Mills, Ken Lynch and Ed Prentiss guest star.
261	26	"Dark Enough to See the Stars"	Donald R. Daves	Kelly Colvin	March 12, 1967
A young ranch hand who is running from the law falls in love with a girl. Richard Evans and Richard Eastham guest star.
262	27	"The Deed and the Dilemma"	William F. Claxton	William F. Leicester	March 26, 1967
Ben tries to help the family of immigrant winemaker Giorgio Rossi (first introduced in episode 29 of season 7), but a racist neighbor complicates things. Jack Kruschen (as giorgio) and Brioni Farrell guest star.
263	28	"The Prince"	William F. Claxton	Story by : Melvin Levy; Teleplay by : John Hawkins	April 2, 1967
The Cartwrights welcome Count Alexis (Warren Stevens) and Countess Elena (Claire Griswold), who are being targeted by thieves.
264	29	"A Man Without Land"	Donald R. Daves	Steve McNeil	April 9, 1967
To get Matt Jeffers (Royal Dano)'s land, a foreman murders his son and frames Little Joe.
265	30	"Napoleon's Children"	Christian Nyby	Judith and Robert Guy Barrows	April 16, 1967
Ted Arseneaux (Robert Biheller) believes that he is Napoleon and leads an army of young men in terrorizing Virginia City.
266	31	"The Wormwood Cup"	William F. Claxton	Story by : Joy Dexter; Teleplay by : Joy Dexter and Michael Landon	April 23, 1967
A woman blames Joe for killing her brother and offers a thousand dollars to the man who will kill him in a fair fight. Little Joe tries to convince her that she's wrong, but it might be too late. Frank Overton, Judi Meredith and Clay Tanner guest star.
267	32	"Clarissa"	Lewis Allen	Chester Krumholz	April 30, 1967
The Cartwrights' Eastern cousin Clarissa Cartwright (Nina Foch) brings trouble when she visits to the Ponderosa.
268	33	"Maestro Hoss"	William F. Claxton	U.S. Anderson	May 7, 1967
Phony fortune-teller Madame Marova (Zsa Zsa Gabor) causes earaches when she convinces Hoss he's a master violinist.
269	34	"The Greedy Ones"	Donald R. Daves	James Amesbury	May 14, 1967
Greedy gold hunters threaten to destroy the Ponderosa after a prospector claims to have found a sample there. Robert Middleton, George Chandler and William Bakewell guest star.

== Release ==
Season eight aired on Sundays from 9:00 pm–10:00 pm on NBC.

== Reception ==
The show held the #1 position in the Nielsen ratings for three straight seasons, with season eight being the final season to do so.

=== Awards and nominations ===
Award	Year (Note: Indicates the year of ceremony.)	Category	Nominee(s) / Work	Result	Ref(s)
Primetime Creative Arts Emmy Awards	1967	Individual Achievements in Cinematography—Cinematography	Haskell Boggs and William F. Whitley	Nominated	
