= Bonanza season 13 =

Bonanza
- Season 13
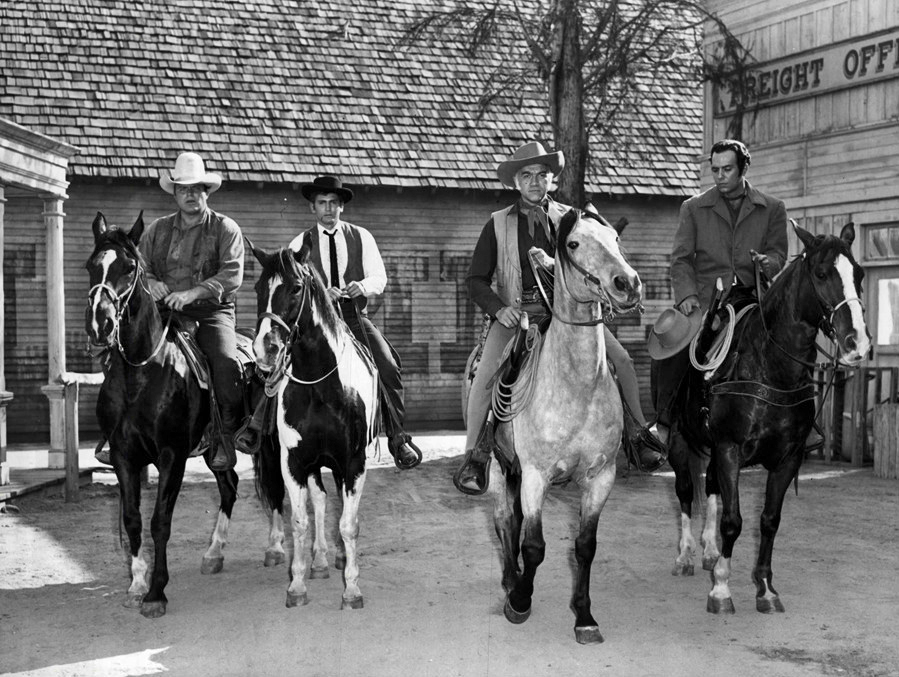
- Cast of Bonanza in 1959
- Starring: Lorne Greene; Dan Blocker; Michael Landon
- No. of episodes: 26

Release
- Original network: NBC
- Original release: September 19, 1971 – April 2, 1972

Season chronology
- ← Previous; Season 12 Next → Season 14

The thirteenth season of the American Western television series Bonanza premiered on NBC on September 19, 1971, with the final episode airing April 2, 1972. The series was developed and produced by David Dortort. Season thirteen starred Lorne Greene, Dan Blocker, and Michael Landon. The season consisted of 26 episodes of a series total 431 hour-long episodes, the entirety of which was produced in color. Season thirteen was aired on Sundays at 9:00 p.m. It fell to #20 in the Nielsen ratings.

== Synopsis ==
Bonanza is set around the Ponderosa Ranch near Virginia City, Nevada and chronicles the weekly adventures of the Cartwright family, consisting of Ben Cartwright (Lorne Greene) and his three sons (each by a different wife), Adam (Pernell Roberts), Eric "Hoss" (Dan Blocker), and Joseph (Michael Landon). Veteran actor Victor Sen Yung played the ranch cook, Hop Sing. In 1964, Pernell Roberts began expressing a desire to leave the series, and so prospective replacements were introduced via Barry Coe as Little Joe's wayward maternal half-brother Clay, and Guy Williams as Ben's nephew Will Cartwright. However, Roberts was persuaded to complete his contract, and remained through season six. The characters of Clay and Will were discontinued. In the ninth season, David Canary was added to the cast as ranch hand/foreman Candy Canady. After four years with the series, Canary left due to a contract dispute. In the twelfth season, Mitch Vogel joined the cast as Jamie Hunter, a teenage orphan who is adopted by Ben Cartwright.

== Cast and characters ==
=== Main cast ===
- Lorne Greene as Ben Cartwright
- Dan Blocker as Eric "Hoss" Cartwright
- Michael Landon as Joseph "Little Joe" Cartwright
- Mitch Vogel as Jamie Hunter Cartwright

=== Recurring ===
- Victor Sen Yung as Hop Sing
- Ray Teal as Sheriff Roy Coffee
- Bing Russell as Deputy Clem Foster
- Lou Frizzell as Dusty Rhodes

=== Guest cast ===
- Diane Baker
- Roscoe Lee Browne
- Charles Cioffi
- Don Collier
- Bradford Dillman
- Buddy Ebsen
- Jodie Foster
- Will Geer
- Lisa Gerritsen
- Joan Hackett
- Lawrence Montaigne
- Richard Mulligan
- Suzanne Pleshette
- Pilar Seurat
- Loretta Swit
- Rip Torn
- Susan Tyrrell
- Peter Whitney

== Episodes ==
Bonanza, season 13 episodes
No. overall	No. in season	Title	Directed by	Written by	Original release date
390	1	"The Grand Swing"	William F. Claxton	John Hawkins, Ward Hawkins	September 19, 1971
Against Ben's orders, Jamie drives a supply wagon on a route he's not supposed to; he loses control and wrecks the wagon. Jamie escapes uninjured but one of the horses is so badly hurt it has to be shot.
391	2	"Fallen Woman"	Lewis Allen	Ward Hawkins	September 26, 1971
Jill Conway (Susan Tyrrell) is an alcoholic mother whose husband was sent to prison (for robbery) on Hoss's testimony. In a pent-up rage, Jill demands that Hoss look after her son.
392	3	"Bushwhacked"	William Wiard	Preston Wood	October 3, 1971
Two ranchers find a seriously wounded Little Joe in the Nevada desert. As he struggles for life, Joe mumbles incoherently about his surrealistic nightmares about a teepee and a wagon wheel.
393	4	"Rock-a-Bye, Hoss"	Herschel Daugherty	Preston Wood, Robert Vincent Wright	October 10, 1971
A "beautiful baby" contest that Hoss is judging quickly turns into a circus, thanks to the fortune-hunting parents who are determined to win at all costs.
394	5	"The Prisoners"	William F. Claxton	Arthur Heinemann	October 17, 1971
Little Joe helps an old-time sheriff escort cunning outlaw Hank Simmons to jail. The crafty Simmons kills the sheriff and injures Joe, but Joe turns out to always be one step ahead of Simmons.
395	6	"Cassie"	Herschel Daugherty	True Boardman	October 24, 1971
The Cartwrights assist Jamie's friend, Cassie O'Casey (Lisa Gerritsen), and Cassie's mother (Diane Baker) in dealing with their father and husband, Kevin, who is running a race horse scam.
396	7	"Don't Cry, My Son"	Michael Landon	Michael Landon	October 31, 1971
Virginia City's new doctor, Mark Sloan (Richard Mulligan), is dealt a double-blow when his wife leaves him, blaming him for their baby being stillborn. In the heat of the moment, Sloan kidnaps the baby of another woman.
397	8	"Face Of Fear"	Chris Christenberry	Ken Pettus	November 14, 1971
Jamie's girlfriend, Neta Thatcher, witnesses a drifter named Griff Bannon (Bradford Dillman) rob and kill a man at a roadside camp.
398	9	"Blind Hunch"	Lewis Allen	John Hawkins, Robert Pirosh	November 21, 1971
Civil War veteran Will Hewitt (Rip Torn) returns to Virginia City, blinded and determined to solve the mystery behind the death of his brother.
399	10	"The Iron Butterfly"	Leo Penn	Harold Swanton	November 28, 1971
Vengeful Sen. Carson (Peter Whitney) pins the blame on Hoss when his son is killed by his ex-girlfriend. The Cartwrights do all they can to stop Carson from destroying the Ponderosa.
400	11	"The Rattlesnake Brigade"	William Wiard	Gordon T Dawson	December 5, 1971
Jamie and three of his schoolmates - Lester, Judith and Roberto - are kidnapped after church by the nefarious Doyle gang, who escaped from a wagon carrying them to prison.
401	12	"Easy Come, Easy Go"	Joseph Pevney	Jack B. Sowards	December 12, 1971
In the third and final episode featuring the Calhouns, Luke is bankrupted after a stock investment gone bad, so he and his daughter Meena move to the Ponderosa until he can get back on his feet.
402	13	"A Home for Jamie"	Leo Penn	Jean Holloway	December 19, 1971
Ben begins the process to adopt Jamie as his son, but the process is complicated when Jamie's maternal grandfather, Ferris Callahan (Will Geer), comes forward wanting custody.
403	14	"Warbonnet"	Arthur H. Nadel	Arthur Heinemann	December 26, 1971
Joe is caught in the middle of a bitter dispute between an aging Native American chief and the man who stole the Indian's warbonnet years ago as a saloon decoration.
404	15	"The Lonely Man"	William F. Claxton	John Hawkins	January 2, 1972
In a rare episode with Hop Sing in the spotlight, the Cartwrights' cook is panning for gold during a vacation when he and a white woman (Kelly Jean Peters) fall in love. The relationship blossoms into an engagement, but the interracial marriage never takes place because the law forbids it, and some whites are angry about the idea.
405	16	"Second Sight"	Lewis Allen	Arthur Weingarten, Suzanne Clauser	January 9, 1972
Hoss turns to a clairvoyant named Judith Coleman (Joan Hackett) to help in a search for Jamie, who has gotten lost in the high country. However, Judith is reluctant to help out, fearing that her psychic abilities will ruin her engagement to a minister.
406	17	"The Saddle Stiff"	William F. Claxton	Samuel A. Peeples, John Hawkins	January 16, 1972
Cactus Murphy (Buddy Ebsen), an embittered ranch hand whom Ben fired, suggests that the Cartwright patriarch is getting a little old to "put in a real week's work." Ben's response: Take a job with rancher Paul Walker (Don Collier) under the assumed name Ben Brown and show Murphy that he is still more than capable of sweating out the job of a rancher.
407	18	"Frenzy"	Lewis Allen	Preston Wood, Karl Tunberg	January 30, 1972
Ben's friendship with the Kosovos, a young immigrant family from Serbia, puts him in danger when family patriarch Nick suffers a psychotic snap, goes on a rampage and barricades them in their home.
408	19	"Customs of the Country"	Joseph Pevney	Joseph Bonaduce	February 6, 1972
In a satirical look at unusual, silly laws and customs, Joe and Hoss try to explain to their skeptical father why their delivery run to Agua Santos, Mexico took so long. An unimpressed Ben listens as his sons explain their story. Pilar Seurat guest stars.
409	20	"Shanklin"	Leo Penn	William Kelley	February 13, 1972
A band of rogue ex-Confederate soldiers comes to the Ponderosa to demand a $25,000 ransom. Hoss tries to disrupt the robbery and is critically wounded by the group's leader, Shanklin (Charles Cioffi).
410	21	"Search in Limbo"	Leo Penn	Don Ingalls	February 20, 1972
The Cartwrights attempt to reconstruct a 24-hour period of Ben's life after he fears he may have been the unknown gunman who shot down Sid Langley (Lawrence Montaigne), a corrupt real estate broker who has become hated in Virginia City.
411	22	"He Was Only Seven"	Michael Landon	Michael Landon	March 5, 1972
Jamie's 7-year-old friend, Jonah Morgan, is badly wounded when he and Jamie walk into the Virginia City Bank during a robbery by the evil Springer gang. Roscoe Lee Browne guest stars.
412	23	"The Younger Brothers' Younger Brother"	Michael Landon	Michael Landon	March 12, 1972
It's a case of comic mistaken identity when Hoss - on a delivery run for the Ponderosa - is mistaken as a member of the bumbling Younger Brothers gang.
413	24	"A Place to Hide"	Herschel Daugherty	William D. Gordon, Ward Hawkins	March 19, 1972
A friend of Ben's (Suzanne Pleshette) asks to stay with her daughter (Jodie Foster) at the Ponderosa for a time. Soon Ben discovers the woman is trying to plan a rendezvous with her husband who is a fugitive confederate soldier. Note: Although not his final appearance, this was the last episode Dan Blocker worked on.
414	25	"A Visit to Upright"	William Wiard	Joseph Bonaduce	March 26, 1972
Ben's ability to close a lucrative cattle purchase with a picky livestock heiress (Loretta Swit) hinges on Hoss and Joe's ability to sell a dilapidated saloon they were duped into buying.
415	26	"One Ace Too Many"	Lewis Allen	Stanley Roberts	April 2, 1972
In his second attempt to cash in on Ben's good name, crooked lookalike Bradley Meredith learns that the Cartwrights are in Carson City and, posing as Ben, pretends that he is seriously ill and begins to liquidate the Ponderosa's assets.

== Release ==
Season thirteen aired on Sundays from 9:00 pm–10:00 pm on NBC.

== Reception ==
Season thirteen fell to #20 in the Nielsen ratings.
