= Bonanza season 12 =

Bonanza
- Season 12
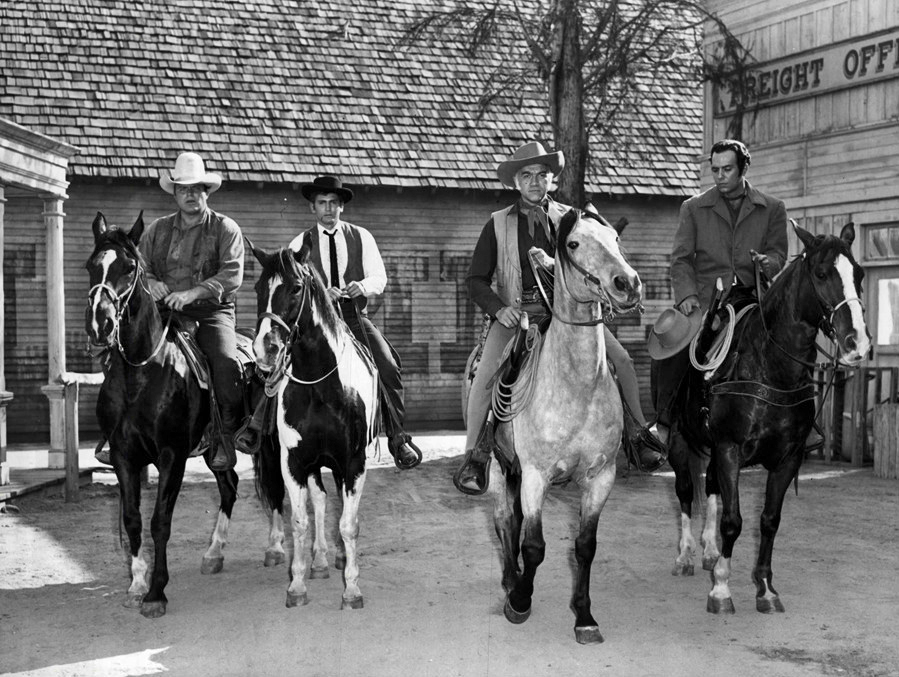
- Cast of Bonanza in 1959
- Starring: Lorne Greene; Dan Blocker; Michael Landon
- No. of episodes: 28

Release
- Original network: NBC
- Original release: September 13, 1970 – April 11, 1971

Season chronology
- ← Previous; Season 11 Next → Season 13

The twelfth season of the American Western television series Bonanza premiered on NBC on September 13, 1970, with the final episode airing April 11, 1971. The series was developed and produced by David Dortort. Season twelve starred Lorne Greene, Dan Blocker, and Michael Landon. The season consisted of 28 episodes of a series total 431 hour-long episodes, the entirety of which was produced in color. Season twelve was aired on Sundays at 9:00 p.m. It finished the season at #9 in the Nielsen ratings, behind #5 Gunsmoke.

== Synopsis ==
Bonanza is set around the Ponderosa Ranch near Virginia City, Nevada and chronicles the weekly adventures of the Cartwright family, consisting of Ben Cartwright (Lorne Greene) and his three sons (each by a different wife), Adam (Pernell Roberts), Eric "Hoss" (Dan Blocker), and Joseph (Michael Landon). Veteran actor Victor Sen Yung played the ranch cook, Hop Sing. In 1964, Pernell Roberts began expressing a desire to leave the series, and so prospective replacements were introduced via Barry Coe as Little Joe's wayward maternal half-brother Clay, and Guy Williams as Ben's nephew Will Cartwright. However, Roberts was persuaded to complete his contract, and remained through season six. The characters of Clay and Will were discontinued. In the ninth season, David Canary was added to the cast as ranch hand/foreman Candy Canady. After four years with the series, Canary left due to a contract dispute. In the twelfth season, Mitch Vogel joined the cast as Jamie Hunter, a teenage orphan who is adopted by Ben Cartwright.

== Cast and characters ==
=== Main cast ===
- Lorne Greene as Ben Cartwright
- Dan Blocker as Eric "Hoss" Cartwright
- Michael Landon as Joseph "Little Joe" Cartwright
- Mitch Vogel as Jamie Hunter Cartwright

=== Recurring ===
- Victor Sen Yung as Hop Sing
- Ray Teal as Sheriff Roy Coffee
- Bing Russell as Deputy Clem Foster
- Lou Frizzell as Dusty Rhodes

=== Guest cast ===
- David Canary
- Marlene Clark
- Roger Davis
- Sandy Duncan
- Jack Elam
- Jo Van Fleet
- Meg Foster
- Victor French
- Will Geer
- Louis Gossett Jr.
- Jill Haworth
- Dean Jagger
- Salome Jens
- Ben Johnson
- Richard Kiley
- Louise Latham
- Carol Locatell
- Daniel Massey
- Heather Menzies
- Vera Miles
- Terry Moore
- Richard Mulligan
- Denver Pyle
- Richard Thomas

== Episodes ==
Bonanza, season 12 episodes
No. overall	No. in season	Title	Directed by	Written by	Original release date
362	1	"The Night Virginia City Died"	William Wiard	John Hawkins	September 13, 1970
A series of destructive fires has Virginia City residents on edge and anxious to catch the arsonist.
363	2	"A Matter of Faith"	William Wiard	Jack B. Sowards, John Hawkins	September 20, 1970
An orphaned rainmaker named Jamie Hunter comes to Virginia City, hoping to help relieve the drought-stricken area. When Jamie's efforts aren't immediately successful, Ben helps the lad fend off the frustrated ranchers.
364	3	"The Weary Willies"	Leo Penn	Robert Pirosh	September 27, 1970
The Cartwrights lend their support to The Weary Willies, a group of Civil War veterans who are struggling to re-enter society. Richard Thomas guest stars.
365	4	"The Wagon"	James Neilson	Ken Pettus	October 4, 1970
Hoss is falsely accused of murder by a corrupt sheriff named Price Buchanan (Denver Pyle). While en route to prison, Hoss manages to escape the prison wagon with a woman named Madge Tucker (Salome Jens).
366	5	"The Power of Life and Death"	Leo Penn	Joel Murcott	October 11, 1970
The Cartwrights are part of a posse that is after Davis, who shot and killed an Army colonel, when they are attacked by a rogue Indian tribe.
367	6	"Gideon, the Good"	Herschel Daugherty	Ken Pettus	October 18, 1970
Gideon Yates (Richard Kiley), a corrupt lawman whose wife (Terry Moore) had shot her soon-to-be ex-husband, tries to silence the murder's only witness - Little Joe Cartwright.
368	7	"The Trouble with Trouble"	Herschel Daugherty	Jack B. Sowards	October 25, 1970
Hoss unwittingly volunteers to be named sheriff of an aptly named town named Trouble.
369	8	"Thornton's Account"	William F. Claxton	Preston Wood	November 1, 1970
After Ben is seriously injured in a horse-riding accident far from home, Joe seeks help from valley settlers who are terrified of a corrupt rancher and his foremen.
370	9	"The Love Child"	Michael Landon	Michael Landon	November 8, 1970
Old-school Zach Randolph (Will Geer) refuses to make amends with his gravely ill daughter, Etta (Carol Locatell), because her son had been born out of wedlock. Ben risks his family's friendship with the Randolphs to set the stubborn old man straight.
371	10	"El Jefe"	William F. Claxton	Ken Pettus	November 15, 1970
The Cartwrights come to the aid of Mexican farmers in the Prince River vicinity, after they were run off the land by a corrupt tycoon wanting to strip mine the area.
372	11	"The Luck of Pepper Shannon"	Nicholas Webster	John Hawkins	November 22, 1970
A reformed outlaw named Pepper Shannon comes to the Ponderosa seeking a job. Ben agrees to hire him, but has to keep both Pepper and an impressionable Jamie away from each other.
373	12	"The Impostors"	Lewis Allen	Robert Vincent Wright	December 13, 1970
Joe and Hoss pose as stagecoach robbers in an effort to track down their stolen money. However, their plans are forced to change after the wife of one of the robbers shows up.
374	13	"Honest John"	Lewis Allen	Arthur Heinemann	December 20, 1970
Honest John, a drifter, is looking for a nest and hopes to settle on the Ponderosa through his rapport with the newly adopted Jamie. But John's breakthrough with the boy must be weighed against the seamier side of his character.
375	14	"For a Young Lady"	Don Richardson	B. W. Sandefur	December 27, 1970
Jamie's new friend Carrie Sturgis, herself an orphan, is the subject of a heated custody battle between her scheming aunt and uncle. Joe takes it upon himself to see that the girl is protected.
376	15	"A Single Pilgrim"	William Wiard	Arthur Weingarten, Suzanne Clauser	January 3, 1971
Hoss is seriously wounded while accompanying the Brennan clan, Virginia natives who are settling out West, across Nevada Territory.
377	16	"The Gold-Plated Rifle"	Joseph Pevney	Preston Wood	January 10, 1971
In this adaptation of the Prodigal Son, Jamie - who is struggling to adjust to life on the Ponderosa and at his new school - damages Ben's valuable rifle. Refusing to take responsibility, he runs away.
378	17	"Top Hand"	William F. Claxton	Arthur Heinemann, John Hawkins	January 17, 1971
During a cattle drive, Ben finds himself involved in a power struggle between the trail boss the Cartwrights appointed (Ben Johnson) and a fellow rancher's foreman (Roger Davis), who schemes to take over the job.
379	18	"A Deck of Aces"	Lewis Allen	Stanley Roberts	January 31, 1971
Ben's dead-on lookalike, the scheming Bradley Meredith, causes serious problems when he poses as the Cartwright patriarch and sells area ranchers' land to the railroad.
380	19	"The Desperado"	Philip Leacock	George Lovell Hayes	February 7, 1971
It's a case of reverse racism, as a white-hating black outlaw couple (Louis Gossett Jr., Marlene Clark) kidnap Hoss and scheme to kill him.
381	20	"The Reluctant American"	Philip Leacock	Stanley Roberts	February 14, 1971
Leslie and Gillian Harwood (Daniel Massey and Jill Haworth, respectively) come to Nevada from England to take over the operation of a failing ranch near the Ponderosa.
382	21	"Shadow of a Hero"	Leo Penn	John Hawkins, Mel Goldberg	February 21, 1971
Gen. Ira Cloninger (Dean Jagger), an old friend of the Cartwrights, is toasted at a ceremony as a hero and asked to run for governor.
383	22	"The Silent Killer"	Leo Penn	John Hawkins	February 28, 1971
When an influenza outbreak strikes the Ponderosa, treatment methods and philosophy clash between two women from different generations, Harriet Clinton (Louise Latham) and Evangeline Woodtree (Meg Foster).
384	23	"Terror at 2:00"	Michael Landon	Michael Landon	March 7, 1971
A white supremacist named Mr. Ganns plans to disrupt a peace-treaty signing between the people of Virginia City and the Paiutes by massacring the entire town, then pin the blame on the Indian tribe.
385	24	"The Stillness Within"	Michael Landon	Suzanne Clauser	March 14, 1971
Joe is blinded by an explosion and wallows in self-pity as he struggles to come to grips with his condition. Ben hires a teacher (Jo Van Fleet) from the Institute for the Blind to help Joe deal with his predicament.
386	25	"A Time to Die"	Philip Leacock	Don Ingalls	March 21, 1971
Ben's friend, April Christopher (Vera Miles), is bitten by a rabid wolf during her visit. With no treatment available, the Cartwrights and April's family struggle to watch her condition deteriorate.
387	26	"Winter Kill"	William Wiard	Story by : Jack Rummler; Teleplay by : John Hawkins and Robert Pirosh	March 28, 1971
During a harsh winter that kills off the stock of many ranchers, Ben offers to test a new breed's endurance by herding a cow from the stock on Sawtooth Mountain.
388	27	"Kingdom of Fear"	Joseph Pevney	Michael Landon	April 4, 1971
A delusional mining tycoon has the Cartwrights and Candy arrested on false trespassing charges and sentences them to slave labor at a gold mine. Richard Mulligan guest stars.
389	28	"An Earthquake Called Callahan"	Herschel Daugherty	Preston Wood	April 11, 1971
A traveling professional wrestler named Tom Callahan (Victor French) is the only person who can prove Dusty Rhodes's innocence when the Ponderosa foreman is falsely jailed. Sandy Duncan guest star.

== Release ==
Season twelve aired on Sundays from 9:00 pm–10:00 pm on NBC.

== Reception ==
Season twelve finished the season at #9 in the Nielsen ratings, behind #5 Gunsmoke.

=== Awards and nominations ===
Award	Year (Note: Indicates the year of ceremony.)	Category	Nominee(s) / Work	Result	Ref(s)
Primetime Creative Arts Emmy Awards	1971	Outstanding Achievement in Music Composition—For a Series or a Single Program of a Series (First Year of Music's Use Only)	David Rose (for "The Love Child")	Won	
Primetime Creative Arts Emmy Awards	1971	Outstanding Achievement in Cinematography for Entertainment Programming—For a Series or a Single Program of a Series	Ted Voigtlander (for "The Love Child")	Nominated	
