= Bonanza season 14 =

Bonanza
- Season 14
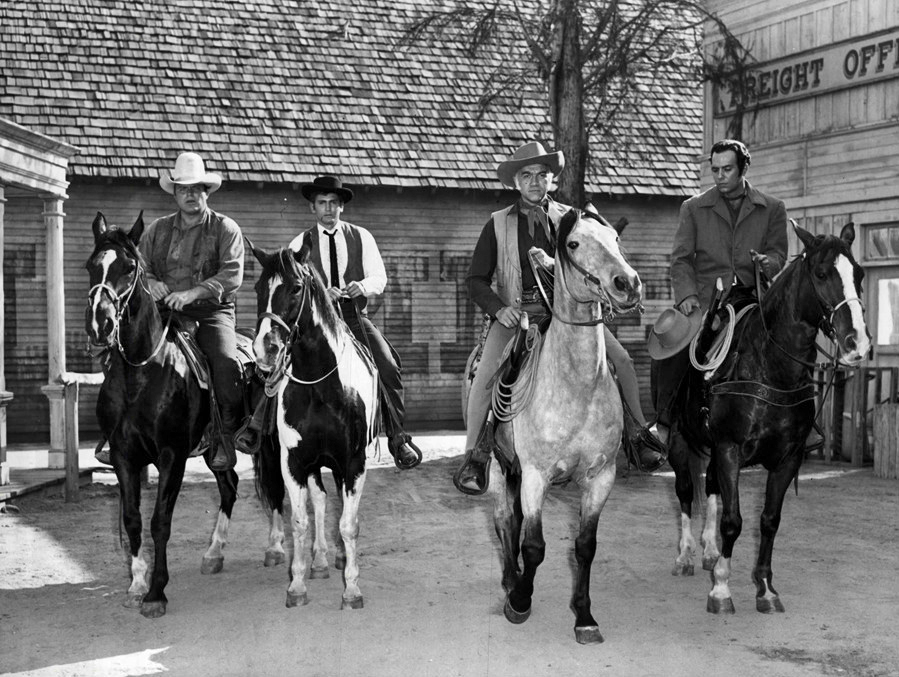
- Cast of Bonanza in 1959
- Starring: Lorne Greene; Michael Landon
- No. of episodes: 16

Release
- Original network: NBC
- Original release: September 12, 1972 – January 16, 1973

Season chronology
- ← Previous; Season 13

The fourteenth season of the American Western television series Bonanza premiered on NBC on September 12, 1972, with the final episode airing January 16, 1973. This was the final season for the series. The series was developed and produced by David Dortort. Season fourteen starred Lorne Greene and Michael Landon, the first season following the death of Dan Blocker. The season consisted of 16 episodes of a series total 431 hour-long episodes, the entirety of which was produced in color. Season fourteen moved to a new timeslot of Tuesdays from 8:00 pm–9:00 pm on NBC. The final season fell out of the top 30 in the Nielsen ratings.

This is also only season in Canada with simultaneous substitution from NBC across Canada via cable on CBC Television.

== Synopsis ==
Bonanza is set around the Ponderosa Ranch near Virginia City, Nevada and chronicles the weekly adventures of the Cartwright family. In season 14, this consists of Ben Cartwright (Lorne Greene) and his son Joseph (Michael Landon) and Jamie Hunter Cartwright (Mitch Vogel), a teenage orphan who is adopted by Ben. Veteran actor Victor Sen Yung played the ranch cook, Hop Sing. In the ninth season, David Canary was added to the cast as ranch hand/foreman Candy Canady. Tim Matheson was introduced as ex-prisoner and newly hired ranch-hand Griff King.

== Cast and characters ==
=== Main cast ===
- Lorne Greene as Ben Cartwright
- Michael Landon as Joseph "Little Joe" Cartwright
- Mitch Vogel as Jamie Hunter Cartwright
- David Canary as "Candy" Canaday
- Tim Matheson as Griff King

=== Recurring ===
- Victor Sen Yung as Hop Sing
- Bing Russell as Deputy Clem Foster

=== Guest cast ===
- Jack Albertson
- Sian Barbara Allen
- Bonnie Bedelia
- Karen Carlson
- Mike Farrell
- Pamela Franklin
- Ron Howard
- Ken Howard
- Robert Lansing
- Andy Robinson
- Tom Skerritt

== Background and production ==
=== Casting ===
Season 14 included a number of changes in casting. Dan Blocker died in May 1972 after season thirteen ended, leaving only Greene and Landon as original top billed cast. David Canary, who had left over a contract dispute after three seasons returned as Candy Canady with opening credits billing. Tim Matheson was introduced as ex-prisoner and newly hired ranch-hand Griff King.

== Episodes ==
Bonanza, season 14 episodes
No. overall	No. in season	Title	Directed by	Written by	Original release date
416	1	"Forever"	Michael Landon	Michael Landon	September 12, 1972
417	2	"Forever"	Michael Landon	Michael Landon	September 19, 1972
Part 1: Little Joe falls in love with Alice Harper (played by a young Bonnie Bedelia) who he meets while rescuing her gambler brother John (Andy Robinson) from a poker game gone bad. Part 2: After Little Joe and Alice Harper are married, she is murdered at their new home. Joe returns to find their house burnt to the ground and his beautiful bride dead.
418	3	"Heritage of Anger"	Nicholas Webster	Don Ingalls	September 26, 1972
Ben helps ex-convict John Dundee (Robert Lansing) re-adjust to society. However, Dundee's boorish attitude complicates matters.
419	4	"The Initiation"	Alf Kjellin	Douglas Day Stewart	October 3, 1972
Jamie joins an elite club. However, when a classmate dies from cardiac arrhythmia during the initiation, the club's president Ted Hoag (Ron Howard) is blamed.
420	5	"Riot!"	Lewis Allen	Robert Pirosh	October 10, 1972
Ben becomes horrified while inspecting living conditions at the Nevada State Prison. So are the frustrated inmates, who take Ben hostage and make a series of demands to improve conditions. Note: first episode of Griff King.
421	6	"New Man"	Leo Penn	Jack B. Sowards	October 17, 1972
In this sequel episode to "Riot," Ben helps parolee Griff King adjust to life outside of prison, giving him a job as a ranch hand.
422	7	"Ambush at Rio Lobo"	Nicholas Colasanto	Joel Murcott	October 24, 1972
Ben and a pregnant woman (Sian Barbara Allen) are held hostage by a gang of robbers, who are plotting a stagecoach robbery and are determined to prevent interference by anyone with the name Cartwright.
423	8	"The 26th Grave"	Nicholas Colasanto	Stanley Roberts	October 31, 1972
Samuel Clemens (Ken Howard) makes his return to Virginia City, this time offering tall tales over an unsolved murder that was tied to a claim jumping.
424	9	"Stallion"	E. W. Swackhamer	Jack B. Sowards	November 14, 1972
Joe is given a beautiful, black stallion for his birthday present, but winds up sacrificing it when he rides to the rescue of a young boy who was accidentally shot by his outlaw father.
425	10	"The Hidden Enemy"	Alf Kjellin	Stanley Roberts	November 28, 1972
Dr. James Wills (Mike Farrell) is Virginia City's new town doctor. He can bring many new procedures to Nevada Territory. However, Dr. Wills is addicted to morphine, which results in trouble ... and in the end, tragedy.
426	11	"The Sound of Sadness"	Michael Landon	Michael Landon	December 5, 1972
Griff's friend, widowed farmer Jonathan May (Jack Albertson), wants to adopt two young orphans, one of whom is unable to talk. When Jonathan is told he cannot adopt the boys, Griff decides to set the adoption agency folks straight on what a loving father is.
427	12	"The Bucket Dog"	William F. Claxton	John Hawkins	December 19, 1972
Jamie buys an Irish setter named April. However, April was a runt and - according to its rightful owner - should be put to sleep because it is a disgrace to the breed. When April competes in a field trial, the dog's owner soon learns that it's not the size of the dog that matters, but the size of the fight in the dog.
428	13	"First Love"	Leo Penn	Richard Collins	December 26, 1972
Jamie becomes friends with Kelly Edwards (Pamela Franklin), who is abused by her husband, Dan. The catch: the husband happens to be the new teacher at the Virginia City School.
429	14	"The Witness"	Lewis Allen	Story by : Arthur Heinemann; Teleplay by : Joel Murcott and Arthur Heinemann	January 2, 1973
A man posing as Candy robs one of Ben's elderly business associates; during the robbery, the woman suffers a fatal heart attack. Candy is quickly arrested and brought to trial.
430	15	"The Marriage of Theodora Duffy"	William F. Claxton	Ward Hawkins	January 9, 1973
Unknown to the Cartwrights, Griff is asked to be a government witness in helping to bring a gang of war criminals to justice and Griff is asked to pose as the husband of beautiful Theodora Duffy (Karen Carlson), whom the Cartwrights think Griff had abandoned years ago. Note: Last episode filmed, but broadcast second-to-last based on edict from NBC that a season finale episode could not be focused on character(s) that weren't Cartwrights.
431	16	"The Hunter"	Michael Landon	Michael Landon	January 16, 1973
During a delivery run, Joe meets Cpl. Bill Tanner (Tom Skerritt), who turns out to be a war-deranged madman who enjoys stalking down his helpless victims before killing them. After stealing Joe's wagon and his supplies, the psychotic Tanner explains that Joe just became his latest "prey."

== Release ==
For season fourteen, Bonanza was moved from its previous Sunday night 9:00 pm–10:00 pm timeslot to Tuesdays from 8:00 pm–9:00 pm on NBC. On Tuesdays, it was opposite Maude and Hawaii Five-O on CBS and Temperatures Rising and the Tuesday Movie of the Week on ABC.

== Reception ==
The move from Sunday to Tuesday did not help the show's declining ratings. Hawaii Five-O was already the leader on Tuesdays, at 12 overall in the Nielsen ratings for the previous season. By the 1972 season, Hawaii Five-O gained in the ratings, lifting Maude along with it, topping the Tuesday ratings and securing the number 3 and 4 spots respectively overall. Bonanza fell out of the top 30.
