= Bonanza season 9 =

Bonanza
- Season 9
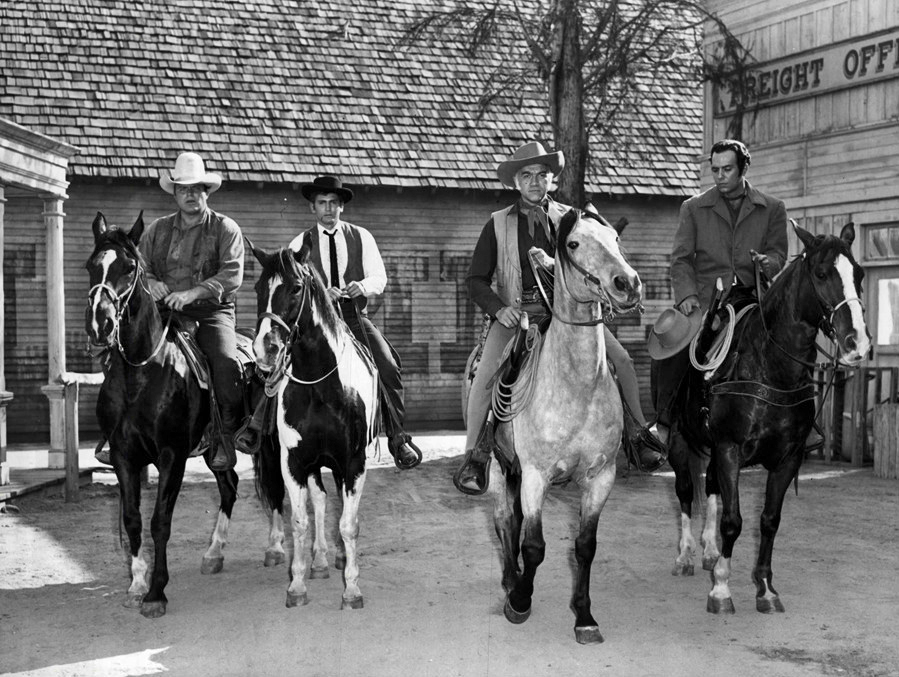
- Cast of Bonanza in 1959
- Starring: Lorne Greene; Dan Blocker; Michael Landon
- No. of episodes: 34

Release
- Original network: NBC
- Original release: September 17, 1967 – July 28, 1968

Season chronology
- ← Previous; Season 8 Next → Season 10

The ninth season of the American Western television series Bonanza premiered on NBC on September 17, 1967, with the final episode airing July 28, 1968. The series was developed and produced by David Dortort. Season nine starred Lorne Greene, Dan Blocker, and Michael Landon. The season consisted of 34 episodes of a series total 431 hour-long episodes, the entirety of which was produced in colour. Season nine was aired on Sundays at 9:00 p.m. After three straight seasons at number one, it slipped to #6 in the Nielsen ratings.

== Synopsis ==
Bonanza is set around the Ponderosa Ranch near Virginia City, Nevada and chronicles the weekly adventures of the Cartwright family, consisting of Ben Cartwright and his three sons (each by a different wife), Adam, Eric ("Hoss"), and Joseph ("Little Joe"). A regular character is their ranch cook, Hop Sing.

== Cast and characters ==
=== Main cast ===
- Lorne Greene as Ben Cartwright
- Dan Blocker as Eric "Hoss" Cartwright
- Michael Landon as Joseph "Little Joe" Cartwright
- David Canary as "Candy" Canaday

=== Recurring ===
- Victor Sen Yung as Hop Sing
- Ray Teal as Sheriff Roy Coffee
- Bing Russell as Deputy Clem Foster

=== Guest cast ===
- Noah Beery Jr.
- James Best
- Michael Blodgett
- Wally Cox
- Kathleen Crowley
- Kim Darby
- Albert Dekker
- Michael Forest
- James Gregory
- Ron Hayes
- Kim Hunter
- Arch Johnson
- John Kellogg
- Tina Louise
- Paul Mantee
- Michael Murphy
- J. Carrol Naish
- Andre Philippe
- Carlos Rivera
- Albert Salmi
- John Saxon
- Tisha Sterling
- Susan Strasberg
- Tom Tully
- Jan-Michael Vincent
- Robert Walker Jr.
- Dawn Wells
- James Whitmore
- Michael Witney
- William Windom

== Production ==
=== Filming ===
On location filming took place at the following:

- Ponderosa Ranch at Incline Village - "Desperate Passage", "Showdown at Tahoe"
- Lake Tahoe - "Showdown at Tahoe"
- Vasquez Rocks - "The Thirteenth Man"
- Franklin Lake - "Star Crossed", "A Severe Case of Matrimony"
- Bronson Canyon - "Commitment at Angelus", "In Defense of Honor", "To Die in Darkness"

The episode "Showdown at Tahoe" used the M. S. Dixie II, an operating tour vessel on Lake Tahoe.

== Episodes ==
Bonanza, season 9 episodes
No. overall	No. in season	Title	Directed by	Written by	Original release date
270	1	"Second Chance"	Leon Benson	Story by : Paul Schneider; Teleplay by : John Hawkins and Paul Schneider	September 17, 1967
Ben joins an Army patrol to try and save Hoss and Joe from Indians. When Joe is wounded, they meet a dying doctor who is willing to help them. James Gregory guest stars.
271	2	"Sense of Duty"	William Witney	Story by : Gil Lasky and Abe Polsky; Teleplay by : John Hawkins	September 24, 1967
Ben leads a militia troop unit that takes Paiute Indian Wabuska (Michael Forest), a man who is seen as a God by the Indians, to prison. (The first episode to feature David Canary as Candy Canady).
272	3	"The Conquistadores"	Leon Benson	Walter Black	October 1, 1967
Joe is kidnapped by a band of Mexicans miners searching for gold and held for ransom, but thieves are out to take the gold for themselves. John Saxon, John Kellogg and Carlos Rivera guest star.
273	4	"Judgement at Olympus"	John Rich	Walter Black	October 8, 1967
Candy is framed for the murder of A.Z. Wheelock's (Arch Johnson) son in the town of Olympus, so Joe and Hoss try to clear him.
274	5	"Night Of Reckoning"	Leon Benson	Walter Black	October 15, 1967
A band of outlaws, previously involved in wounding Donnie Buckler (Ron Hayes), take Joe, Hoss, and Candy hostage as they search the Ponderosa for holdup money taken by one of their own.
275	6	"False Witness"	Michael Moore	Eric Norden	October 22, 1967
Billy Slater (Michael Blodgett) and Doug Slater (Bill Fletcher)'s gang stalk Joe, Hoss, Candy and a woman since they witnessed one of their crimes.
276	7	"The Gentle Ones"	Harry Harris	Frank Chase	October 29, 1967
An animal-loving cowboy (Robert Walker Jr.) must stand up to his brutish older brother in order to prove to a widow that he's not a coward.
277	8	"Desperate Passage"	Leon Benson	John Hawkins	November 5, 1967
The Cartwrights encounter two survivors of an Indian raid—a suspected murderer and a woman (Tina Louise) who knows he's innocent.
278	9	"The Sure Thing"	William Witney	Story by : Robert Vincent Wright; Teleplay by : Robert Vincent Wright and Sidney Ellis	November 12, 1967
A young woman, Trudy Loughlin (Kim Darby), has a dream of riding her stallion in a big-stakes race, but this is jeopardized when her father, Burt Laughlin (Tom Tully), associates himself with a gambler.
279	10	"Showdown At Tahoe"	Gerald Mayer	Thomas Thompson	November 19, 1967
Candy sets a trap for a band of outlaws bent on robbing Ben's timber operation.
280	11	"Six Black Horses"	Donald R. Daves	Story by : William Jerome; Teleplay by : William Jerome and Michael Landon	November 26, 1967
An Irishman uses luck to outwit greedy businessmen.
281	12	"Check Rein"	Leon Benson	Story by : Robert I. Holt; Teleplay by : Olney Sherwood and Robert I. Holt	December 3, 1967
The Cartwrights get involved in a man's fight to save his inheritance and himself from his greedy uncle.
282	13	"Justice Deferred"	Gerald Mayer	Jack Miller	December 17, 1967
Hoss realizes that his testimony has led to the hanging of an innocent man, so he sets out to convict the real killer.
283	14	"The Gold Detector"	Donald R. Daves	Ward Hawkins	December 24, 1967
After buying a gold detector, Hoss tries to prove its worth and protect it from thieves. Guest starring Wally Cox, and Caroline Richter.
284	15	"The Trackers"	Marc Daniels	Story by : Frederick Louis Fox; Teleplay by : Reuben Bercovitch	January 7, 1968
Ben, Candy and Hoss try to protect a recently-released prisoner suspected of robbery and murder.
285	16	"A Girl Named George"	Leon Benson	William H. Wright	January 14, 1968
The Cartwrights investigate a mystery involving an altered photograph.
286	17	"The Thirteenth Man"	Leon Benson	Walter Black	January 21, 1968
The Cartwrights clash with a range detective (Albert Salmi) who pressures his suspects into drawing first so he can kill them.
287	18	"The Burning Sky"	John Rich	Story by : Carol Saraceno; Teleplay by : William H. Wright	January 28, 1968
A ranch hand (Michael Murphy) causes trouble when he arrives with his Indian bride (Dawn Wells).
288	19	"The Price of Salt"	Leon Benson	B. W. Sandefur	February 4, 1968
A woman (Kim Hunter) who has a monopoly on the salt needed for cattle sets off the buyers when she raises the price. James Best guest stars.
289	20	"Blood Tie"	Seymour Robbie	Arthur Dales^{[B]}	February 18, 1968
One of three men tricks the Cartwrights into hiring him so he and his cohorts can rob them.
290	21	"The Crime of Johnny Mule"	Leon Benson	Joel Murcott	February 25, 1968
Johnny Mule (Noah Beery, Jr.), the man Hoss refused to convict for murder, breaks out of prison.
291	22	"The Late Ben Cartwright"	Leon Benson	Walter Black	March 3, 1968
An assassin complicates Ben's fight to prevent a corrupt tycoon's lackey from being elected governor.
292	23	"Star Crossed"	William F. Claxton	Thomas Thompson	March 10, 1968
Candy falls for a girl (Tisha Sterling) being harassed by a former lawman-turned-blackmailer (William Windom).
293	24	"Trouble Town"	Leon Benson	David Lang	March 17, 1968
The Cartwrights must find out why Candy is being held in River Bend on a minor charge without bail.
294	25	"Commitment at Angelus"	Leon Benson	Peter Germano	April 7, 1968
Joe gets involved in a miners' strike after the death of a friend leaves the miners without a leader.
295	26	"A Dream to Dream"	William F. Claxton	Michael Landon	April 14, 1968
When a man's guilt over his son's death lead him to drinking, his wife and other children pay more attention to Hoss.
296	27	"In Defense of Honor"	Marc Daniels	Story by : Richard Wendley and William Douglas Lansford; Teleplay by : William Douglas Lansford	April 28, 1968
An outcast jeopardizes negotiations with the Indians when he decides to rejoin the tribe he rejected his whole life.
297	28	"To Die in Darkness"	Michael Landon	Michael Landon	May 5, 1968
Ben and Candy are trapped in a mine shaft by a vengeful ex-prisoner (James Whitmore), who wrongly served time based on the testimony of the pair.
298	29	"The Bottle Fighter"	Leon Benson	Story by : Colin MacKenzie and S. H. Barnett; Teleplay by : John Hawkins	May 12, 1968
The only lawyer (Albert Dekker) who can defend Hoss in the case of a murdered cattle buyer is an alcoholic.
299	30	"The Arrival of Eddie"	Marc Daniels	John M. Chester and Ward Hawkins	May 19, 1968
Hoss seeks forgiveness from Eddie MaKay (Jan-Michael Vincent) for killing his father.
300	31	"The Stronghold"	Leon Benson	John Hawkins and William Riley Burnett	May 26, 1968
Joe and Candy are swindled out of a herd of cattle by the Farrell brothers (Paul Mantee, Michael Witney), so they follow the sparring brothers back to their Arizona hideout.
301	32	"Pride of a Man"	William F. Claxton	Ward Hawkins and Helen B. Hicks	June 2, 1968
Joe takes a job as a substitute teacher and must deal with two incorrigible boys and their father, who doesn't think his boys need an education.
302	33	"A Severe Case of Matrimony"	Lewis Allen	Michael Fessier	July 7, 1968
A band of Gypsies arrives on the Ponderosa and one of them wishes to marry a Cartwright. Guest stars: J. Carrol Naish as Anselmo, Susan Strasberg as Rosalita, and Andre Philippe as Paco
303	34	"Stage Door Johnnies"	William F. Claxton	Alex Sharp	July 28, 1968
Hoss and Joe allow their rivalry for the affections of an attractive singer (Kathleen Crowley) to get them into damage suits.

== Release ==
Season nine aired on Sundays from 9:00 pm–10:00 pm on NBC.

== Reception ==
After three straight seasons in the number one spot, it slipped to #6 in the Nielsen ratings.
