= Bonanza season 6 =

Bonanza
- Season 6
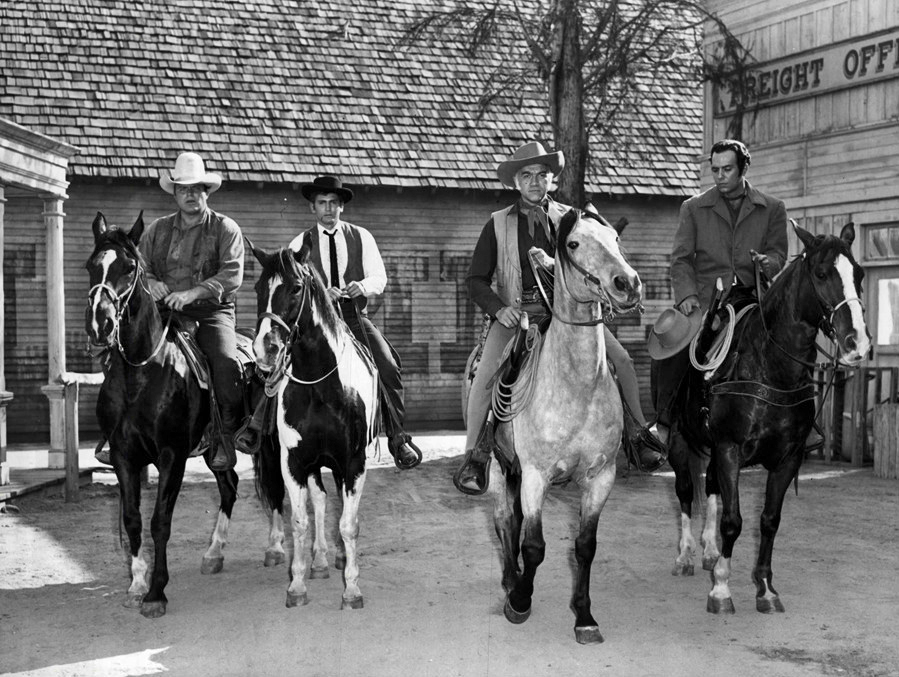
- Cast of Bonanza in 1959
- Starring: Lorne Greene; Pernell Roberts; Dan Blocker; Michael Landon
- No. of episodes: 34

Release
- Original network: NBC
- Original release: September 20, 1964 – May 23, 1965

Season chronology
- ← Previous; Season 5 Next → Season 7

The sixth season of the American Western television series Bonanza premiered on NBC on September 20, 1964, with the final episode airing May 23, 1965. The series was developed and produced by David Dortort, and season six starred Lorne Greene, Pernell Roberts, Dan Blocker, and Michael Landon. The season consisted of 34 episodes of a series total 431 hour-long episodes, the entirety of which was produced in color. Season six was aired on Sundays at 9:00 p.m. It moved up to capture the #1 spot in the Nielsen ratings for the 1964-1965 season, a position it would hold for three straight seasons.

== Synopsis ==
Bonanza is set around the Ponderosa Ranch near Virginia City, Nevada and chronicles the weekly adventures of the Cartwright family, consisting of Ben Cartwright and his three sons (each by a different wife), Adam, Eric ("Hoss"), and Joseph ("Little Joe"). A regular character is their ranch cook, Hop Sing.

== Cast and characters ==
=== Main cast ===
- Lorne Greene as Ben Cartwright
- Pernell Roberts as Adam Cartwright
- Dan Blocker as Eric "Hoss" Cartwright
- Michael Landon as Joseph "Little Joe" Cartwright

=== Recurring ===
- Victor Sen Yung as Hop Sing
- Ray Teal as Sheriff Roy Coffee
- Bing Russell as Deputy Clem Foster

=== Guest cast ===
- Lola Albright
- Hoyt Axton
- Noah Beery Jr.
- Charles Bronson
- Bruce Cabot
- Rory Calhoun
- Anthony Caruso
- Barrie Chase
- Steve Cochran
- John Conte
- Susanne Cramer
- Elaine Devry
- Dan Duryea
- Eddie Firestone
- Joan Freeman
- James Gregory
- Joan Hackett
- Mariette Hartley
- Kathryn Hays
- Earl Holliman
- Steve Ihnat
- Richard Jaeckel
- Henry Jones
- Barry Kelley
- George Kennedy
- Henry Kulky
- Sue Ane Langdon
- Viveca Lindfors
- Fabrizio Mioni
- Andrew Prine
- Aldo Ray
- Michael Rennie
- Cesar Romero
- Telly Savalas
- Jacqueline Scott
- Brenda Scott
- Everett Sloane
- Guy Stockwell
- Harold J. Stone
- Ernest Truex
- Warren Vanders
- Jean Willes
- Grant Williams
- Ed Wynn
- Bruce Yarnell
- Tony Young

== Production ==
=== Filming ===
On location shooting for season six was completed at the following sites:

- Baldwin Gold Mine, Holcomb Valley - "The Hostage"
- Red Rock Canyon - "The Wild One"
- Golden Oak Ranch - "Logan's Treasure", "Women of Fire", "The Spotlight"
- Vasquez Rocks - "Between Heaven and Earth"
- Iverson's Movie Ranch - "The Far, Far Better Thing"

== Episodes ==
Bonanza, season 6 episodes
No. overall	No. in season	Title	Directed by	Written by	Original release date
169	1	"Invention of a Gunfighter"	John Florea	Daniel B. Ullman	September 20, 1964
Joe teaches to his friend Johnny Chapman (Guy Stockwell) how to use a six-shooter, only for the man to embark on a career as a ruthless bounty hunter.
170	2	"The Hostage"	Don McDougall	Don Mullally	September 27, 1964
Ben is taken hostage by a band of outlaws demanding a ransom of $100,000. The Cartwrights formulate a plan to rescue their father. Harold J. Stone and Jacqueline Scott guest star.
171	3	"The Wild One"	William Witney	Jo Pagano	October 4, 1964
Hoss is looking for a wild stallion for breeding and he chooses a gruff mountaineer (Aldo Ray), who is later confronted by the wife (Kathryn Hays) he left long ago.
172	4	"Thanks for Everything, Friend"	Christian Nyby	Jerry Adelman	October 11, 1964
Tom Wilson (Rory Calhoun), who's an expert in cards and women, saves Adam from drowning. This event begins a friendship that Adam will later regret.
173	5	"Logan's Treasure"	Don McDougall	Story by : Robert Sabaroff; Teleplay by : Ken Pettus	October 18, 1964
Sam Logan (Dan Duryea) gets out of prison and tries to avoid those who are certain he's hidden a cache of stolen gold somewhere. Ben believes him and invites him to stay at the Ponderosa.
174	6	"The Scapegoat"	Christian Nyby	Rod Peterson	October 25, 1964
Hoss befriends suicidal man Waldo Watson (George Kennedy), who turns out to be a scapegoat for three men who intend to do him harm.
175	7	"A Dime's Worth of Glory"	William F. Claxton	Richard Shapiro and Esther Mayesh	November 1, 1964
Ben and Adam capture a known outlaw that tried to hold up the stage they were passengers on. After this episode, Ben turns down a dime novelist's offer to make the Cartwrights famous, so the novelist gives it to aging Sheriff Laramore (Bruce Cabot).
176	8	"Square Deal Sam"	Murray Golden	Jessica Benson and Murray Golden	November 8, 1964
The Cartwrights fall for the schemes of con artist Samuel T. Washburn, nicknamed Square Deal Sam (Ernest Truex).
177	9	"Between Heaven and Earth"	William Witney	Ed Adamson	November 15, 1964
Joe and his friend Mitch Devlin (Richard Jaeckel) are chasing a sheep-killing puma and Joe has to climb a steep slope, but something goes wrong.
178	10	"Old Sheba"	John Florea	Alex Sharp	November 22, 1964
Hoss injured traveling circus wrestler Bearcat Samspon (Henry Kulky). When the owner of the traveling circus squanders Hoss's winnings in a wrestling match, Joe and Hoss receive an elephant as payment.
179	11	"A Man to Admire"	John Florea	Mort R. Lewis	December 6, 1964
Hoss is accused of murdering a scheming businessman, and then has to rely on his new friend, an alcoholic lawyer (James Gregory), to clear him.
180	12	"The Underdog"	William F. Claxton	Don Mullally	December 13, 1964
Joe tries to help half Native American Harry Starr (Charles Bronson), who is accused of being a chronic horse thief.
181	13	"A Knight to Remember"	Vincent McEveety	Robert V. Barron	December 20, 1964
A knight in shining armor who calls himself King Arthur (Henry Jones) scares away bandits trying to rob a stagecoach carrying Adam.
182	14	"The Saga of Squaw Charlie"	William Witney	Warren Douglas	December 27, 1964
Old Indian Squaw Charlie (Anthony Caruso) befriends a little girl in spite of the townspeople ridiculing him. After she goes missing, the whole town wants his blood.
183	15	"The Flapjack Contest"	William F. Claxton	Story by : Tom Davison; Teleplay by : Frank Cleaver	January 3, 1965
Hoss has to stay on a strict diet before a flapjack-eating contest: he has to win against champion Big Ed Simpson (Mel Berger).
184	16	"The Far, Far Better Thing"	Bernard McEveety	Mort R. Lewis	January 10, 1965
Joe competes with ranch hand Tuck (Warren Vanders) for the affections of Lucy Melviney (Brenda Scott), an Eastern girl with a thirst for adventure.
185	17	"Woman of Fire"	William F. Claxton	Suzanne Clauser	January 17, 1965
Shakespeare-inspired Adam takes care of a temperamental señorita (Joan Hackett) while her father finds her a husband.
186	18	"The Ballerina"	Don McDougall	Frank Chase	January 24, 1965
An aspirant ballerina (Barrie Chase) falls for her teacher and faces resistance from her father, who is a traveling violinist.
187	19	"The Flannel-Mouth Gun"	Don McDougall	Leo Gordon and Paul Leslie Peil	January 31, 1965
Desperate ranchers hire a gunman to take care of rustlers; tragedy follows and Sherman Clegg (Earl Holliman) is accused of murder.
188	20	"The Ponderosa Birdman"	Herbert L. Strock	Blair Robertson and Hazel Swanson	February 7, 1965
An eccentric inventor (Ed Wynn) plans to take flight with his meticulously crafted wings. Hoss tries to help him and his overly-protective granddaughter.
189	21	"The Search"	William F. Claxton	Frank Cleaver	February 14, 1965
Adam searches for his troublesome lookalike Tom Burns. His search lands him in the Placerville jail. Lola Albright and Elaine Devry guest star.
190	22	"The Deadliest Game"	Gerd Oswald	Jo Pagano	February 21, 1965
Aging circus aerialist Guido Borelli (Cesar Romero) grows jealous of his partner Petina's (Ilze Taurins) attraction to Joe, but he's quick to comfort her after a fistfight with her boyfriend Carlo (Fabrizio Mioni) lands Joe in prison.
191	23	"Once a Doctor"	Tay Garnett	Martha Wilkerson	February 28, 1965
A vengeful Englishman comes after Doctor P.A. Mundy (Michael Rennie), nicknamed Professor Poppy, that he blames for the death of his wife.
192	24	"Right Is the Fourth R"	Virgil Vogel	Jerry Adelman	March 7, 1965
Adam tries to teach a course in frontier history and learns some unsettling facts about the territory's founders. Everett Sloane, Mariette Hartley and Barry Kelley guest star.
193	25	"Hound Dog"	Ralph E. Black	Alex Sharp	March 21, 1965
Cousin Muley Jones (Bruce Yarnell) returns along with hound dogs, but Tracy Ledbetter (Sue Ane Langdon) claims he stole them from her.
194	26	"The Trap"	William Witney	Ken Pettus	March 28, 1965
Married man Burk (Steve Cochran) sets a trap to keep Joe away from his wife (Joan Freeman), but when his plan backfires and he ends up dead, his twin brother decides to finish the job.
195	27	"Dead and Gone"	Robert Totten	Paul Schneider	April 4, 1965
Adam tries to help wandering troubadour Howard Mead (Hoyt Axton) overcome his habit of stealing after he tried to rob Johann Brunner (Steve Ihnat) and his sister Hilda (Susanne Cramer). Note: This was Pernell Roberts last episode on "Bonanza" he would appear in the two following episodes that were filmed before Dead and Gone.
196	28	"A Good Night's Rest"	William F. Claxton	Story by : Jeffrey Fleece; Teleplay by : Frank Cleaver	April 11, 1965
After dealing with Hoss' snoring, Adam's guitar playing and Little Joe's courting shenanigans, Ben checks into a hotel to try to get a good night's sleep. Eddie Firestone and Jean Willes guest star.
197	29	"To Own the World"	Virgil Vogel	Ed Adamson	April 18, 1965
Wealthy tycoon Charles Augustus Hackett (Telly Savalas) is out to get the Ponderosa.
198	30	"Lothario Larkin"	William Witney	Warren Douglas	April 25, 1965
Infamous womanizer Lothario Larkin (Noah Beery, Jr.) returns to Virginia City, to the displeasure of the fathers and the sheriff.
199	31	"The Return"	Virgil Vogel	Story by : Frank Chase & Ken Pettus; Teleplay by : Ken Pettus	May 2, 1965
Ex-convict Trace Cordell (Tony Young) returns to town, but no one is glad to see him, especially Paul Dorn (John Conte), the banker he crippled in a bank robbery.
200	32	"Jonah"	William F. Claxton	Preston Wood	May 9, 1965
Ranch hand George Whitman (Andrew Prine) is offered a job on the Ponderosa when he saves Hoss's life, but rumors state that he's a jinx.
201	33	"The Spotlight"	Gerd Oswald	Richard Carr	May 16, 1965
Ben tries to talk retired opera star Angela Bergstrom (Viveca Lindfors) into resuming her career on the stage.
202	34	"Patchwork Man"	Ralph E. Black	Don Tait and William Koenig	May 23, 1965
Hoss hires recluse Albert 'Patch' Saunders (Grant Williams) to work on the Ponderosa. After learning about Patch's past, Hoss decides to help him.

== Release ==
Season six aired on Sundays from 9:00 pm–10:00 pm on NBC.

== Reception ==
Season six was the first season the show captured the #1 position in the Nielsen ratings. It held that position for the three straight seasons.

=== Awards and nominations ===
Award	Year (Note: Indicates the year of ceremony.)	Category	Nominee(s) / Work	Result	Ref(s)
Primetime Creative Arts Emmy Awards	1965	Outstanding Individual Achievements in Entertainment—Cinematographer	Haskell Boggs and William Whitley	Nominated	
Primetime Creative Arts Emmy Awards	1965	Outstanding Individual Achievements in Entertainment—Color Consultant	Edward Ancona	Won	
