= Bonanza season 5 =

Bonanza
- Season 5
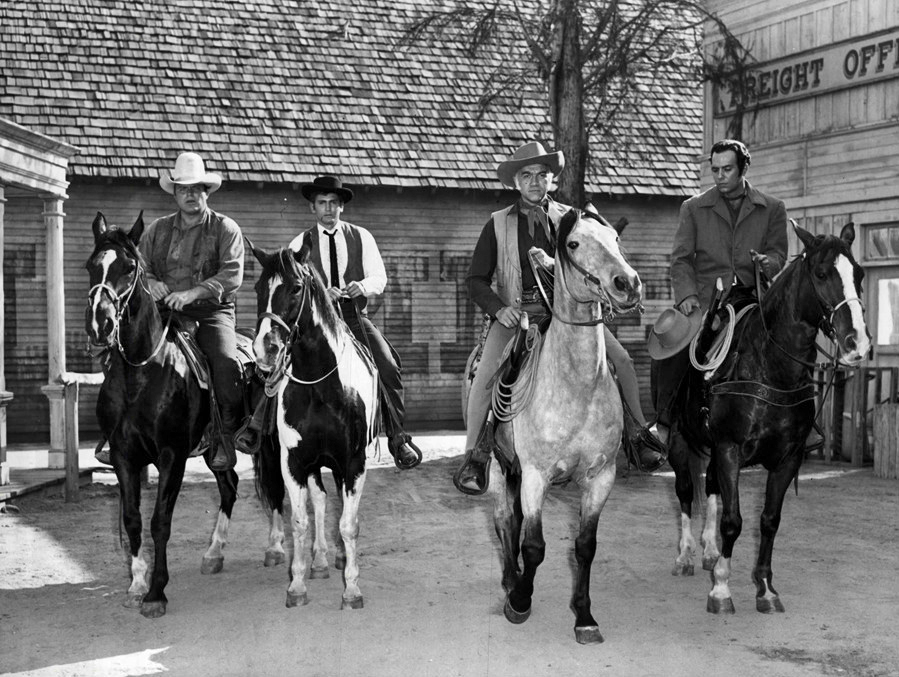
- Cast of Bonanza in 1959
- Starring: Lorne Greene; Pernell Roberts; Dan Blocker; Michael Landon
- No. of episodes: 34

Release
- Original network: NBC
- Original release: September 22, 1963 – May 24, 1964

Season chronology
- ← Previous; Season 4 Next → Season 6

The fifth season of the American Western television series Bonanza premiered on NBC on September 22, 1963, with the final episode airing May 24, 1964. The series was developed and produced by David Dortort, and season five starred Lorne Greene, Pernell Roberts, Dan Blocker, and Michael Landon. The season consisted of 34 episodes of a series total 431 hour-long episodes, the entirety of which was produced in color. Season five was aired on Sundays at 9:00 p.m. It ranked #2 in the Nielsen ratings, the highest rated Western for the 1963-1964 season.

== Synopsis ==
Bonanza is set around the Ponderosa Ranch near Virginia City, Nevada and chronicles the weekly adventures of the Cartwright family, consisting of Ben Cartwright and his three sons (each by a different wife), Adam, Eric ("Hoss"), and Joseph ("Little Joe"). A regular character is their ranch cook, Hop Sing.

== Cast and characters ==
=== Main cast ===
- Lorne Greene as Ben Cartwright
- Pernell Roberts as Adam Cartwright
- Dan Blocker as Eric "Hoss" Cartwright
- Michael Landon as Joseph "Little Joe" Cartwright

=== Recurring ===
- Victor Sen Yung as Hop Sing
- Ray Teal as Sheriff Roy Coffee
- Bing Russell as Deputy Clem Foster
- Guy Williams as Will Cartwright

=== Guest cast ===
- Philip Abbott
- Stanley Adams
- John Anderson
- James Best
- Patricia Blair
- Joan Blondell
- Kathie Browne
- Judy Carne
- Anjanette Comer
- Lloyd Corrigan
- Christopher Dark
- Davey Davison
- John Dehner
- Andrew Duggan
- Glenda Farrell
- Jay C. Flippen
- Jonathan Harris
- Robert H. Harris
- Stacy Harris
- Marianna Hill
- Dennis Hopper
- Clegg Hoyt
- John Hubbard
- Arthur Hunnicutt
- John Kellogg
- Jean LaFitte
- Sean McClory
- William Marshall
- Strother Martin
- Marlyn Mason
- Slim Pickens
- Phillip Pine
- Stefanie Powers
- Wayde Preston
- Gena Rowlands
- Richard Rust
- Frank Silvera
- Julie Sommars
- Robert Sorrells
- Katie Sweet
- Inga Swenson
- Marlo Thomas
- Jesse White
- Teresa Wright
- Keenan Wynn
- Bruce Yarnell

== Production ==
=== Casting ===
Pernell Roberts had been unhappy with the show from the beginning and had threatened to leave the show multiple times. To plan for a possible early departure of Roberts, Guy Williams was cast as a potential substitute character, cousin Will Cartwright. Roberts ultimately completed the term of his six season contract and Williams was only used for the single season.

=== Filming ===
Filming locations for season five included Golden Oak Ranch ("The Waiting Game", "The Lila Conrad Story", and "Triangle"), Vasquez Rocks ("Alias Joe Cartwright"), Golden Oaks Ranch ("Bullet for a Bride"), and

Iverson Movie Ranch ("Walter and the Outlaws").

== Episodes ==
Bonanza, season 5 episodes
No. overall	No. in season	Title	Directed by	Written by	Original release date
135	1	"She Walks in Beauty"	Don McDougall	William L. Stuart	September 22, 1963
Hoss takes a liking to a woman (Gena Rowlands) whose good looks have only led to unhappiness and a questionable choice of professions. Hoss asks her to be his wife and believes she can change even after she tries to seduce his brother Adam.
136	2	"A Passion for Justice"	Murray Golden	Peter Packer	September 29, 1963
Charles Dickens (Jonathan Harris) founds himself embroiled in controversy and antagonizes the citizens of Virginia City with his arrogance.
137	3	"Rain from Heaven"	Lewis Allen	Robert Vincent Wright	October 6, 1963
A rainmaker (John Anderson) offers his services to Virginia City during a drought. He brings with him his very sick daughter.
138	4	"Twilight Town"	John Florea	Cy Chermak	October 13, 1963
Bushwhacked, Joe wanders into a seemingly deserted town and collapses. He awakens and Louise (Davey Davison) tends to his wound, telling him he is in Martinville. Louise's father (Stacy Harris) and others enlist Joe's help to combat a terrorizing outlaw gang, but the town's sheriff's widow (Dorris Dowling) warns Joe to leave while he can. At the conclusion of a mighty battle, Joe's family finds him alone in a deserted town with no signs of life. Did Joe rally the town's citizens, or did he have a supernatural encounter?
139	5	"The Toy Soldier"	Tay Garnett	Warren Douglas	October 20, 1963
Adam helps an alcoholic artist (Philip Abbott) deal with bigots opposed to his marriage to a Paiute woman.
140	6	"A Question of Strength"	Don McDougall	Frank Cleaver	October 27, 1963
Hoss journeys through the wilderness with two nuns after bandits wreck their stagecoach. Judy Carne and John Kellogg guest star.
141	7	"Calamity Over the Comstock"	Charles R. Rondeau	Warren Douglas	November 3, 1963
Little Joe befriends and brings home to the Ponderosa Calamity Jane (Stefanie Powers), only to face the wrath of her boyfriend (Christopher Dark). Note: The real Calamity Jane and her family didn't reach Virginia City, Nevada until 1866, at which time she was only 14 years of age. Also, the time-frame of this episode was during the presidency of Abraham Lincoln, 1861–1865 (see season five, episode five, "The Toy Soldier" which aired two weeks earlier).
142	8	"Journey Remembered"	Irving J. Moore	Anthony Lawrence	November 10, 1963
Ben remembers his journey west with his second wife, Hoss's mother, Inger (Inga Swenson), after seeing Hoss in the barn waiting for a mare to be born.
143	9	"The Quality of Mercy"	Joseph H. Lewis	Peter Packer	November 17, 1963
Joe struggles with his conscience after witnessing a mercy-killing committed by his friend Seth Pruitt (Richard Rust). Note: This was one of Michael Landon's favorite episodes.
144	10	"The Waiting Game"	Richard Sarafian	Ed Adamson	December 8, 1963
Adam becomes attracted to Laura (Kathie Browne), a widow who's unwilling to tell her daughter Peggy (Katie Sweet) the bad news about her father, Frank Dayton (Wayde Preston), being dead.
145	11	"The Legacy"	Bernard McEveety	Anthony Wilson	December 15, 1963
Believing their father to be dead after he goes missing while tracking poachers, the Cartwright boys set out to find the men who did it. Robert H. Harris, Phillip Pine and James Best guest star.
146	12	"Hoss and the Leprechauns"	John Florea	Robert Barron	December 22, 1963
Hoss brings home a strongbox filled with gold, claiming it belongs to leprechauns. A newly arrived Irish professor confirms the mythical creatures' presence and the whole town goes searching for them. Sean McClory, Robert Sorrells and Clegg Hoyt guest star.
147	13	"The Prime of Life"	Christian Nyby	Peter Packer	December 29, 1963
Ben competes with an old rival to win the railroad's lumber contract, but he soon questions his fitness to run the Ponderosa after an accident wounds him and kills a ranch hand. Jay C. Flippen guest stars.
148	14	"The Lila Conrad Story"	Tay Garnett	Story by : George Waggner; Teleplay by : Preston Wood	January 5, 1964
The Cartwrights protect dance-hall girl Lila Conrad (Patricia Blair) from the friends of the man she killed in self-defense and from self-righteous Judge David Knowlton (Andrew Duggan) intent on saving her soul.
149	15	"Ponderosa Matador"	Don McDougall	Alex Sharp	January 12, 1964
The Cartwright boys compete for the attention of a visiting señorita (Marianna Hill): Adam relies on his charm and guitar, Hoss and Little Joe opt for a bull fight.
150	16	"My Son, My Son"	William F. Claxton	Denne Petitclerc	January 19, 1964
Ben's marriage to widow Katherine Saunders (Teresa Wright) is jeopardized by the widow's son being accused of murder.
151	17	"Alias Joe Cartwright"	Lewis Allen	Robert Vincent Wright	January 26, 1964
Joe is mistaken for an Army deserter who looks similar to him and has only a stubborn career army sergeant (Keenan Wynn) to help him avoid being executed.
152	18	"The Gentleman from New Orleans"	Don McDougall	William Bruckner	February 2, 1964
Hoss befriends a flamboyant, sword-brandishing newcomer from New Orleans (John Dehner) who claims to be Jean LaFitte.
153	19	"The Cheating Game"	Joseph Sargent	William L. Stuart	February 9, 1964
Laura Dayton (Kathie Browne) is told by a handsome grifter that she'll receive a large sum from her deceased husband's insurance, but it's actually part of a ruse to cheat her out of her money.
154	20	"Bullet for a Bride"	Tay Garnett	Tom Seller	February 16, 1964
Taken by feelings of guilt, Joe proposes to Tessa Caldwell (Marlyn Mason) he blinded by accident on a hunting trip.
155	21	"King of the Mountain"	Don McDougall	Robert Sabaroff	February 23, 1964
Hoss tries to stop Big Jim Leyton (Slim Pickens) and his fiancée's father from killing each other.
156	22	"Love Me Not"	Tay Garnett	Frank Cleaver	March 1, 1964
A girl (Anjanette Comer) who's been held captive by the Paiutes for many years falls in love with Ben when he takes her to the Ponderosa.
157	23	"The Pure Truth"	Don McDougall	Lois Hire	March 8, 1964
As acting deputy, Hoss is sent to bring in a prisoner, but he ends up in the wrong town and accused of robbing the bank. Glenda Farrell, Stanley Adams and Lloyd Corrigan guest star. Note: This was the highest-rated episode of the series (source: Nielsen Media Research and quoted in numerous books).
158	24	"No Less a Man"	Don McDougall	Jerry Adelman	March 15, 1964
The citizens of Virginia City believe Sheriff Roy Coffee (Ray Teal) is too old to stop a raid from the Wagner gang and they demand his resignation.
159	25	"Return to Honor"	Don McDougall	Jack Turley	March 22, 1964
Ben hears his nephew Will (Guy Williams) has been murdered in Pine City, only to learn Will is alive and on the lam from counterfeiters whose engraving plates he swiped (First episode of Will Cartwright).
160	26	"The Saga of Muley Jones"	John Florea	Story by : Alex Sharp and Robert V. Barron; Teleplay by : Robert V. Barron	March 29, 1964
Muley Jones (Bruce Yarnell), a distant cousin of the Cartwrights with a voice that can shatter glass, visits the Ponderosa. Meanwhile, the sheriff is looking for two moonshiners: Eskey (Jesse White) and Yuri (Strother Martin).
161	27	"The Roper"	John Florea	Peter Packer	April 5, 1964
Will (Guy Williams) is taken hostage by outlaws who robbed Ben and killed three Army soldiers. He tries to save Ben and his sons, the doctor (John Hubbard), and the wife of one of the outlaws (Julie Sommars).
162	28	"A Pink Cloud Comes from Old Cathay"	Don McDougall	Lewis Clay	April 12, 1964
Hoss receives a Chinese mail-order bride (Marlo Thomas) by mistake. Her militant ideas ignite a workers' rebellion and threaten the completion of a Virginia City railroad project.
163	29	"The Companeros"	William F. Claxton	Ken Pettus	April 19, 1964
Will Cartwright (Guy Williams) is asked by his old friend Mateo Ybarra (Frank Silvera) to return to Mexico with him to defend President Juarez.
164	30	"Enter Thomas Bowers"	Murray Golden	Jessica Benson and Murray Golden	April 26, 1964
Black opera singer Thomas Bowers (William Marshall) comes to Virginia City for a concert, but is suspected of being a runaway slave; some people want him arrested or worse.
165	31	"The Dark Past"	Murray Golden	William Bruckner	May 3, 1964
Bounty hunter Dev (Dennis Hopper) appears to be haunted by a mysterious incident from his past.
166	32	"The Pressure Game"	Tay Garnett	Don Tait	May 10, 1964
Adam is pressured by Laura Dayton (Kathie Browne)'s aunt Lillian (Joan Blondell) into proposing, but he's unwilling to marry her.
167	33	"Triangle"	Tay Garnett	Frank Cleaver	May 17, 1964
As Adam secretly builds a home for his bride-to-be Laura (Kathie Browne), a love triangle ensues when Will (Guy Williams) falls for Laura Dayton.
168	34	"Walter and the Outlaws"	Ralph E. Black	Lois Hire	May 24, 1964
Old prospector Obie (Arthur Hunnicutt) asks Hoss to help him rescue his dog from gold thieves.

== Release ==
Season five aired on Sundays from 9:00 pm–10:00 pm on NBC.

== Reception ==
=== Awards and nominations ===
Award	Year (Note: Indicates the year of ceremony. Each year is linked to the article about the awards held that year, wherever possible.)	Category	Nominee(s) / Work	Result	Ref(s)
Golden Globe Awards	1964	Best Series—Drama	Bonanza	Nominated	
Golden Globe Awards	1964	Best TV Star—Male	Lorne Greene	Nominated	
