= List of Bonanza characters =

Bonanza is an American Western television series that ran on NBC from September 12, 1959, to January 16, 1973. Lasting 14 seasons and 431 episodes, Bonanza is NBC's longest-running Western, the second-longest-running Western series on U.S. network television (behind CBS's Gunsmoke), and one of the longest-running, live-action American series. The show continues to air in syndication. The show is set in the 1860s and centers on the wealthy Cartwright family, who live in the vicinity of Virginia City, Nevada, bordering Lake Tahoe. The series initially starred Lorne Greene, Pernell Roberts, Dan Blocker and Michael Landon and later featured (at various times) Guy Williams, David Canary, Mitch Vogel and Tim Matheson. The show is known for presenting pressing moral dilemmas.

Though not familiar stars in 1959, the cast quickly became favorites of the first television generation. The order of billing at the beginning of the broadcast appeared to be shuffled randomly each week, with no relation whatsoever to the current episode featured that week.

== Cast ==
List indicator

This section includes characters who will appear or have appeared in at least one season of the series.

- A green cell indicates the actor is a main cast member.
- A red cell indicates the actor is a recurring cast member.
- A light blue cell indicates the actor is a guest or special guest cast member.

=== Main cast ===
Performer	Character	Seasons													
Performer	Character	1	2	3	4	5	6	7	8	9	10	11	12	13	14
Lorne Greene	Ben Cartwright	Main	Main	Main	Main	Main	Main	Main	Main	Main	Main	Main	Main	Main	Main
Pernell Roberts	Adam Cartwright	Main	Main	Main	Main	Main	Main								
Dan Blocker	Eric "Hoss" Cartwright	Main	Main	Main	Main	Main	Main	Main	Main	Main	Main	Main	Main	Main	
Michael Landon	Joseph "Little Joe" Cartwright	Main	Main	Main	Main	Main	Main	Main	Main	Main	Main	Main	Main	Main	Main
David Canary	"Candy" Canaday									Recurring	Main	Main	Guest		Main
Mitch Vogel	Jamie Hunter Cartwright												Main	Main	Main
Tim Matheson	Griff King														Main

=== Recurring cast ===
Performer	Character	Seasons													
Performer	Character	1	2	3	4	5	6	7	8	9	10	11	12	13	14
Victor Sen Yung	Hop Sing	Recurring	Guest	Recurring	Recurring	Recurring	Recurring	Recurring	Recurring	Recurring	Recurring	Recurring	Recurring	Recurring	Recurring
Roy Engel	Dr. Paul (J.P.) Martin (Note: Roy Engel, Grandon Rhodes, and Harry Holcombe all appeared as a number of different doctors during the series. Most often, it was Dr. Paul Martin or Dr. J.P. Martin. Other derivative names included Doctor Martin and Doc Martin. Other credited names by the same actors included, Dr. Paul Kay, Doc Tolliver, Dr. Wayne, Dr. Harris, and Dr. Lewis)	Recurring	Recurring	Recurring	Recurring	Recurring				Guest		Recurring			
Grandon Rhodes	Dr. Paul (J.P.) Martin	Guest			Guest	Recurring	Recurring	Recurring	Recurring	Guest	Guest				
Harry Holcombe	Dr. Paul (J.P.) Martin										Guest	Recurring	Recurring	Recurring	Recurring
Ray Teal	Sheriff Roy Coffee		Recurring	Recurring	Recurring	Recurring	Recurring	Recurring	Recurring	Recurring	Recurring	Recurring	Recurring	Recurring	
Bing Russell	Deputy Clem Foster				Recurring	Guest	Guest	Guest	Recurring	Recurring	Recurring	Recurring	Recurring	Recurring	Recurring
Kathie Browne	Laura Dayton					Recurring									
Katie Sweet	Peggy Dayton					Recurring									
Guy Williams	Will Cartwright					Recurring									
Lou Frizzell	Dusty Rhodes										Guest	Guest	Recurring	Guest	

== Main characters ==
=== Ben Cartwright ===
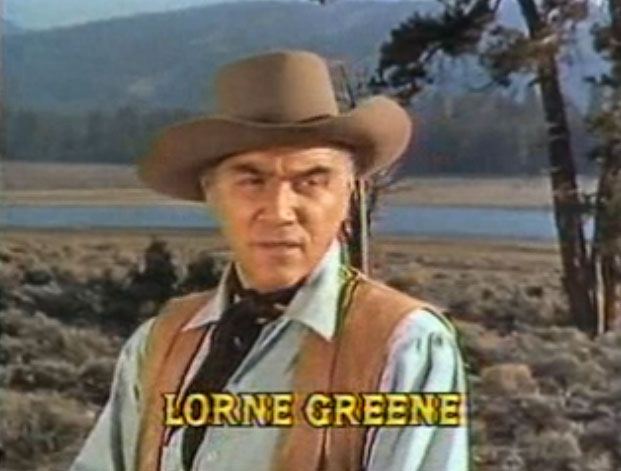
Lorne Greene as Ben Cartwright

Ben Cartwright is the thrice-widowed patriarch of the family. He originated in New England, where he was a seaman under the tutelage of one Abel Stoddard. His first wife was Abel's daughter Elizabeth, and they had one son, Adam. After his wife's death, he and his son traveled to Illinois, where he married his second wife, Inger Borgstrom, and continued west. His second son, Eric, or Hoss, was born in Nebraska on a wagon train. Upon reaching the Ash Hollow station, a fight with Indians occurred, and Inger was killed by an arrow. Ben and his sons then continued west, reaching Nevada, and through much hard work established the Ponderosa Ranch. On a trip to New Orleans to sell beaver pelts, Ben met and married Marie de Marigny, his third and final wife, and they had one son, Joseph, known as "Little Joe." Marie was killed after being thrown from a horse when Joe was 5 years old.

Early in the show's history, Ben recalls each of his late wives in flashback episodes. A standard practice with most Westerns was to introduce some romance but avoid matrimony. Few media cowboys had on-screen wives. Any time one of the Cartwrights seriously courted a woman, she died from a malady, was abruptly slain, or left with someone else. Ben appears in all but fourteen Bonanza episodes. Ben was deceased in the three later Bonanza TV movies, as Lorne Greene died shortly before production of the first film began, even though he had signed up to reprise his role.

In 2007, a TV Guide survey listed Ben Cartwright as television's #2 favorite dad.

Ben is portrayed by Lorne Greene, who was 44 years old at the beginning of the series while Pernell Roberts and Dan Blocker, who portrayed two of his sons, were both 31, only thirteen years younger.

=== Adam Cartwright ===
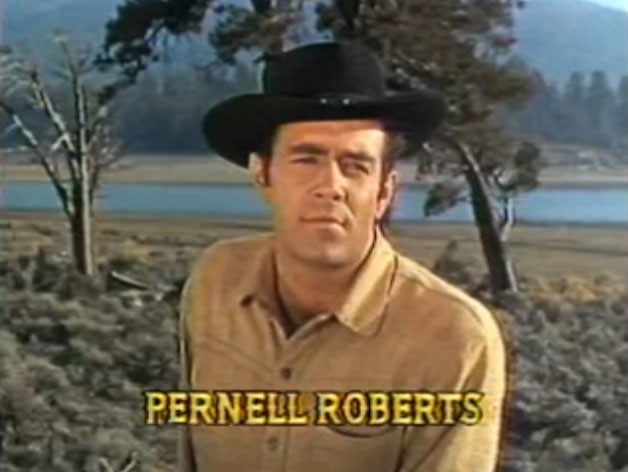
Pernell Roberts as Adam Cartwright

The eldest son, Adam, is an architectural engineer with a university education. Adam built the impressive ranch house.

Despite the show's success, Roberts departed the series after the 1964–65 season (202 episodes) and returned to stage productions, allegedly because of clashes over the show's direction. John Goddard was initially offered the role of Adam Cartwright, but turned it down to star in Johnny Fletcher.

Attempts to replace Adam with Little Joe's maternal half-brother Clay (Barry Coe) and Cartwright cousin Will (Guy "Zorro" Williams), were unsuccessful. Creator David Dortort introduced a storyline that would keep the character of Adam in the mix, but with a lighter schedule. During season five Adam falls for a widow with a young daughter, while making Will Cartwright a central figure. Roberts decided to stay an additional season, so the scripts were quickly revised by having Adam's fiancée and her daughter depart the series prematurely with Guy Williams' Will, with whom she'd fallen in love. It was Landon, not Roberts, who objected to the infusion of any new Cartwrights.

Adam's departure was not directly shown or often addressed in the show itself, although in Season 7, Episode 31, it is implied that Adam went to sea, as one of his shipmates stays with the Cartwrights. In the 1993 film, Bonanaza: The Return, which takes place in 1905, Adam's son, Adam Jr. (A.C.) visits the Ponderosa, revealing that Adam had eventually emigrated to Australia and was occupied with the mining business there. A.C. states that recurring malaria prevented his elderly father from making a trip back to the states.

=== Eric "Hoss" Cartwright ===
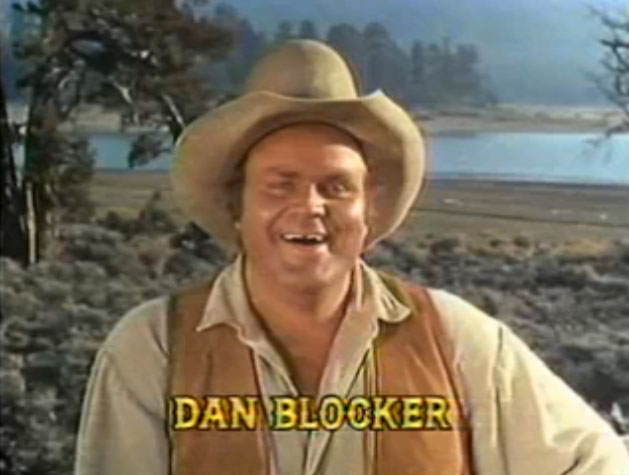
Dan Blocker as Hoss Cartwright

The gentle middle son Eric is almost always referred to as Hoss. The nickname was used as a nod to the character's ample girth, an endearing term for "big and friendly", used by his Swedish mother Inger (and Uncle Gunnar). In the Bonanza flashback, his mother names him Eric after her father. To satisfy young Adam, however, Inger and Ben agree to try the nickname Hoss and "see which one sticks." Inger says of the name Hoss: "In the mountain country, that is the name for a big, friendly man." According to a biography, the show's crew found Blocker to be the "least actor-ish as well as the most likeable" cast member. Producer David Dortort said, "Over the years he gave me the least amount of trouble."

Hoss was portrayed by Dan Blocker, who was 6 feet 4 inches (1.93 m) and 320 pounds (145.15 kg) when he was cast.

In May 1972, Blocker died suddenly from a post-operative pulmonary embolism, following surgery to remove his gall bladder. The producers felt nobody else could continue the role and for the first time a TV show's producers chose to kill off a young major male character (though it had been done twice before with young female leads—in 1956 on Make Room For Daddy, and again in 1963 with The Real McCoys). In the first episode of Season 14, titled "Forever," and the first episode without Blocker, Little Joe and his love-interest imply that Hoss has died, but the specifics are not addressed. Not until the 1988 TV movie Bonanza: The Next Generation was it explained that Hoss had drowned attempting to save a woman's life. Hoss had a son, Josh, who is included in the three Bonanza TV movies.

=== Joseph "Little Joe" Cartwright ===
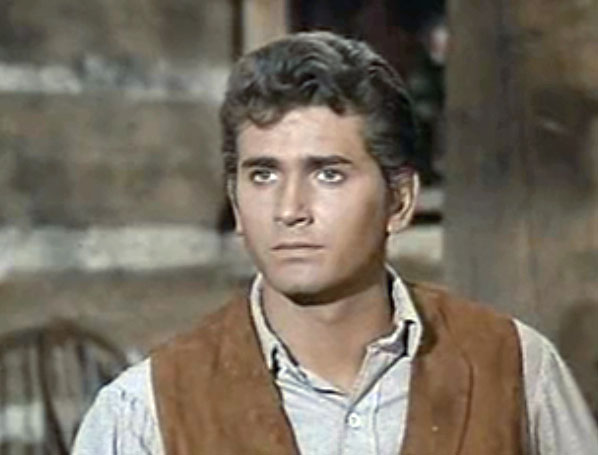
Michael Landon as Little Joe Cartwright

The youngest Cartwright son, whose mother (Felicia in the pilot, and later changed to Marie), a widow, and mother whose child had died of fever (episode "Marie, My Love"), was of French Creole descent. Little Joe appears in all but fourteen Bonanza episodes, a total of 416 episodes.

Beginning in 1962, a foundation was being laid to include another "son" as Pernell Roberts was displeased with his character. In the episode "First Born" (1962), viewers learn of Little Joe's older, maternal half-brother Clay Stafford. The character departed in that same episode, but left an opportunity for a return if needed. This character's paternity is open to debate. In the 1963 flashback episode "Marie, My Love", his father was Jean De'Marigny. Then in 1964, Lorne Greene released the song "Saga of the Ponderosa", wherein Marie's previous husband was "Big Joe" Collins, who dies saving Ben's life. After Ben consoles Marie, the two bond and marry. They choose to honor "Big Joe" by calling their son "Little Joe". So, whether to Stafford, De'Marigny or Collins, Marie Cartwright was previously married. In the last of the three Bonanza TV movies, it is revealed that "Little Joe" had died in the Spanish-American War – a member of the "Rough Riders". Little Joe had a son named Benjamin 'Benj' Cartwright who was played by Landon's real-life son and seen in all three Bonanza TV movies. He also had a daughter, Sarah, who appeared in the later two movies only.

The role of "Little Joe" was given to Michael Landon. He played guest roles on several TV Westerns and attained the title role in I Was a Teenage Werewolf. Landon began to develop his skills in writing and directing Bonanza episodes, starting with "The Gamble". Most of the episodes Landon wrote and directed were dramas, including the two-hour, "Forever" (1972), which was recognized by TV Guide as being one of television's best specials (November 1993). Landon's development was a bit stormy according to David Dortort, who felt that the actor grew more difficult during the last five seasons the show ran.

=== "Candy" Canaday ===
"Candy" Canaday is a plucky Army brat turned cowboy, who became the Cartwrights' confidant, ranch foreman and timber vessel captain.

Dortort was impressed by Canary's talent, but the character vanished in September 1970, after Canary had a contract dispute. He returned two seasons later after co-star Dan Blocker's death, reportedly having been approached by Landon. Canary played the character on a total of 93 episodes. Canary joined the cast in Season 9.

=== Jamie Hunter Cartwright ===
Jamie Hunter was introduced in "A Matter of Faith" (season 12, episode 2). The red-haired orphan of a roving rainmaker, Ben takes him in and adopts him in "A Home for Jamie".

After Canary's departure in mid-1970, and aware of the show's aging demographic, the writers sought a fresh outlet for Ben's fatherly advice. 14 year-old Mitch Vogel was cast as Jamie.

=== Griff King ===
Griff King is a parolee who tries to reform his life as a worker at the Ponderosa Ranch under Ben Cartwright's tutelage.

Tim Matheson portrayed Griff King during the final season, in 1972–73.

== Recurring characters ==
=== Hop Sing ===
Hop Sing, the happy-go-lucky Chinese cook for the Cartwrights, whose blood pressure rose when the family came late for dinner. As the faithful domestic, the comedy relief character had little to do beyond chores. He once used martial arts to assail a towering family foe. Hop Sing appeared in a total of 108 episodes of the series. He was central in two episodes: "Mark of Guilt" and "The Lonely Man".

Hop Sing is portrayed by Chinese American character actor Victor Sen Yung, a veteran of more than 160 appearances in movies and on television between 1937 and 1970 including the "#2 son" in the Charlie Chan series after Keye Luke departed. Bonanza series creator David Dortort told the Archive of American Television that the "Hop Sing" character generated massive fandom - "Victor was just absolutely delightful. He loved the part; he loved doing it. In fact, he began to develop fans, to the extent that I wrote him in as the feature part in a number of shows."

=== Sheriff Roy Coffee ===
Sheriff Coffee was occasionally the focus of a plot as in the episode "No Less a Man". A gang of thieves has been terrorizing towns around Virginia City and the town council wants to replace Coffee, whom they consider over-the-hill, with a younger sheriff before the gang hits town, not realizing that they'd been spared earlier because the gang's leader was wary of Coffee's longevity and only acquiesced to rob the Virginia City bank after extreme pressure from other gang members. Coffee ends up showing the town that youth and a fast gun don't replace experience.

Veteran character actor Ray Teal portrayed Sheriff Roy Coffee in 98 episodes from 1960 to 1972. He appeared in more than 200 movies and some 90 television programs during his 37-year career. His longest-running role was as Sheriff Roy Coffee. He had played a sheriff many times in films and television.

=== Deputy Clem Foster ===
Clem Foster was the good-looking deputy of Virginia City. Clem took over as sheriff when Roy Coffee gave up the office.

The role of Clem Foster was portrayed by Bing Rusell.

=== Will Cartwright ===
Ben's nephew Will Cartwright, was introduced and was the lead character in five episodes,

In 1964, the year that Bonanza hit #1 in the ratings, Guy Williams was slated to replace Pernell Roberts upon Roberts's departure, enabling the series to preserve the four-Cartwright format for the run of the series. He received star billing after the four original rotating Cartwrights during his second appearance going forward, but ultimately, Roberts changed his mind and decided to stay for one more season, and Williams found himself pushed out. It was rumored that Michael Landon and Lorne Greene felt threatened by the studio initiating a precedent of successfully replacing one heroic leading man Cartwright with a new one, particularly in view of Williams' popularity with viewers. Williams had previously portrayed the titular character in Walt Disney's Zorro television series, and went on to play the lead in Lost in Space, a science fiction television series, after the role in Bonanza ended.

=== Dusty Rhodes ===
Dusty Rhodes is a drifter. After meeting Hoss and Little Joe in Virginia City, he starts a livery business in partnership with the Cartwrights. Eventually, he and Jamie Hunter move to Ponderosa and Dusty becomes the ranch foreman.
