= The Chisholms =

1979 American western TV miniseries

- Genre: Western
- Created by: David Dortort
- Developed by: Evan Hunter
- Directed by: Mel Stuart; Edward M. Abroms; Sigmund Neufeld Jr.; Nicholas Webster
- Starring: Robert Preston; Rosemary Harris; Ben Murphy; Mitchell Ryan; Brian Kerwin; Brett Cullen; James Van Patten; Stacy Nelkin; Delta Burke; Susan Swift; Charles Frank; Sandra Griego; Billy Drago; Brian Keith; Anthony Zerbe; Reid Smith
- Country of origin: United States
- Original language: English
- No. of seasons: 2
- No. of episodes: 13

Production
- Executive producers: Alan Landsburg; David Dortort
- Producer: Paul Freeman
- Running time: 275 mins (miniseries); 50 mins (series)
- Production company: Alan Landsburg Productions

Original release
- Network: CBS
- Release: March 29, 1979 – March 15, 1980

The Chisholms is a CBS western miniseries starring Robert Preston, which aired from March 29, 1979, to April 19, 1979; and continued as a television series from January 19, 1980, to March 15, 1980. The original mini-series episodes were filmed in Illinois at New Salem State Park near Springfield, and Jubilie State Park near Peoria.

== Episodes ==
=== Season 1: 1979 miniseries ===
No. overall	No. in season	Title	Directed by	Written by	Original release date
1	1	"Chapter I"	Mel Stuart	Evan Hunter	March 29, 1979
2	2	"Chapter II"	Mel Stuart	Evan Hunter	April 5, 1979
3	3	"Chapter III"	Mel Stuart	Evan Hunter	April 12, 1979
4	4	"Chapter IV"	Mel Stuart	Evan Hunter	April 19, 1979

=== Season 2: 1980 series ===
No. overall	No. in season	Title	Directed by	Written by	Original release date
5	1	"Siege"	Mel Stuart	T : Paul Savage, Corey Blechman; S : Evan Hunter	January 19, 1980
6	2	"Betrayal"	Mel Stuart	T : Paul Savage; S : Evan Hunter	January 26, 1980
7	3	"Endless Desert"	Mel Stuart	T : Corey Blechman; S : Evan Hunter	February 2, 1980
8	4	"Vengeance"	Mel Stuart	T : Paul Savage; S : Evan Hunter	February 9, 1980
9	5	"Death in the Sierras"	Nicholas Webster	Evan Hunter	February 16, 1980
10	6	"The Promised Land"	Mel Stuart	T : David Dortort; S/T : Evan Hunter	February 23, 1980
11	7	"The Suitor"	Edward M. Abroms	Corey Blechman	March 1, 1980
12	8	"Chains"	Sigmund Neufeld Jr.	Kimmer Ringwald	March 8, 1980
13	9	"The Siren Song"	Edward M. Abroms	Harold Swanton	March 15, 1980

== Home media ==
The four part miniseries of The Chisholms was released on VHS by U.S.A Home Video in 1986 in which it was presented as a feature film with a runtime of 4 hours and 37 minutes on two tapes. On June 10, 2014, Timeless Media Group released the complete series on DVD in Region 1.
