= Jack B. Sowards =

TV and Screenwriter (1929–2007)

- Born: March 18, 1929; Texarkana, Arkansas, U.S.
- Died: July 8, 2007 (aged 78); Valley Village, California, U.S.
- Education: University of Texas, Austin
- Occupations: television writer, screenwriter, producer
- Children: 3

Jack B. Sowards (March 18, 1929 – July 8, 2007) was an American screenwriter who wrote Star Trek II: The Wrath of Khan, and the 1988 Star Trek: The Next Generation episode "Where Silence Has Lease". Sowards created the term Kobayashi Maru (a simulation test in The Wrath of Khan), naming it for his next-door neighbors in Hancock Park.

== Military service and acting career ==
A native of Texarkana, Texas, Sowards served in three branches of the United States military -- the army (he participated in the Berlin Airlift), the navy and the air force. After this service, he moved to Los Angeles and found work as a furniture mover, then as an actor, before deciding to become a writer.

== Writing career ==
Sowards had numerous writing credits which extended from episodes of The Bold Ones: The Lawyers in 1969 to an installment of B.L. Stryker in 1990. He was nominated for the Writers Guild of America Award for "The Invasion of Kevin Ireland", the September 26, 1971 episode of The Bold Ones: The Lawyers. He also received a Saturn Award nomination for his work on The Wrath of Khan and shared a Hugo Award nomination for it as well. He wrote episodes for Daniel Boone, The High Chaparral, and Bonanza, where he also served as a story editor. He wrote several Movies of the Week for the Spelling/Goldberg Company, including Deliver Us From Evil (1973 film) with George Kennedy, Jan Michael Vincent, and Jack Weston, Cry Panic with John Forsythe and Anne Francis, and Death Cruise with Richard Long, Kate Jackson, and Tom Bosley. His long career with Quinn Martin Productions resulted in several episodes of The Streets of San Francisco and Barnaby Jones. He served as the Executive Story Consultant for multiple seasons in the mid-70s.

== Death ==
Sowards died in the Valley Village suburb of Los Angeles at the age of 78, from complications of amyotrophic lateral sclerosis.
