= Frank Chase (screenwriter) =

American screenwriter

Frank Chase (February 22, 1923 – July 2, 2004) was an American character actor and screenwriter. As an actor, he is probably best remembered for his role as Deputy Charlie in Attack of the 50 Foot Woman. As a writer, his most prolific work was in the television series Bonanza. Other television series for which he wrote scripts were The Virginian and The High Chaparral.

== Background ==
Frank Chase was born in Potsdam, New York, in 1923. His father was screenwriter Borden Chase. He started out as an actor but moved to writing for television around the end of the 1950s. His sister is actress/dancer Barrie Chase.

He died on July 2, 2004.

== Acting career ==
=== 1930s, 1940s ===
Chase appeared in at least two films in his youth: One in a Million, which was released around 1936/1937, and Thin Ice, released in 1937.

=== 1950s ===
His acting career as an adult began around the early 1950s with small parts in films such as Winchester '73, Bend of the River, Red Ball Express and The World in His Arms. Later he portrayed Borden in the 1952 western, Horizons West. He portrayed Keller in Saskatchewan (1954). He played Stone in Walk the Proud Land, a 1956 western. He also played Deputy Charlie in Attack of the 50 Foot Woman, a sci-fi film about a giant woman released in 1958. His part was as a corny deputy who in one scene comes across a giant footprint in a garden.

=== 1960s ===
Chase's last acting work in the 1960s was an episode in Bonanza and a couple in The Virginian. He played the part of Jim in the Bonanza episode, The Artist. In 1963, he played the part of a wrangler in The Evil That Men Do, an episode of The Virginian. In 1965, he appeared in The Virginian again, in the episode Shadows of the Past, playing the part of a husband. He also wrote the script for the episode.

== Writer ==
His earliest writing work was for the Johnny Tuvo episode of The Texan starring Rory Calhoun in the series' titular role and featuring Ron Hagerthy as Johnny Tuvo.

From 1961 to 1969, he scripted 14 episodes of Bonanza. An episode entitled The Ballerina, which aired in January 1965, is said to have been written by Chase with his ballerina sister Barrie Chase in mind. He also scripted 10 episodes for The Virginian, with airing dates from 1963 to 1970. He also wrote 4 episodes of The High Chaparral.

He wrote the story for the 1967 film, Sullivan's Empire, his only film.
