= Ponderosa Ranch =

Former US theme park in Nevada, US

Coordinates: 39.2365°N 119.9269°W

The Ponderosa Ranch was a theme park based on the television western Bonanza, which housed the land, timber and livestock-rich Cartwright family. The amusement park operated in Incline Village, Nevada, near Lake Tahoe, from 1968 until 2004. Portions of the last five seasons of the TV series and three television films were also filmed at that location.

== Origins ==
=== TV origins of the fictional Ponderosa Ranch ===
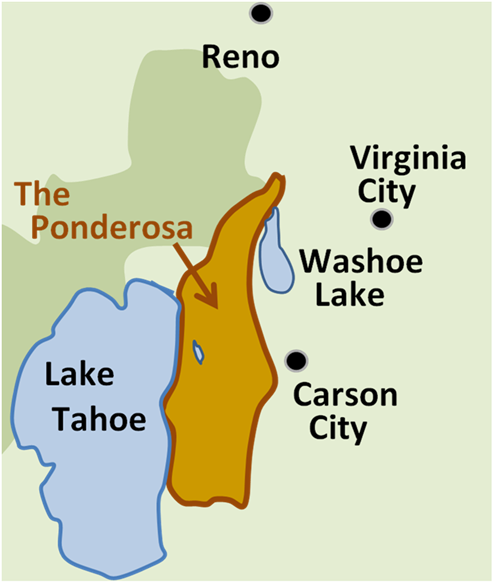
Approximate location of the fictional Ponderosa Ranch from the TV series Bonanza. The map is not to scale and it is oriented with north at the top, instead of east as in the map shown on the TV show.

A replica of the Ponderosa ranch house as seen in the television show.

The Ponderosa was the fictional setting for Bonanza. According to the 9th episode ("Mr. Henry Comstock") in the first season, it was a thousand-square mile (640,000 acre or 2,600 km^{2}) ranch on the shores of Lake Tahoe, nestled high in the Sierra Nevada, with a large ranch house in the center of it. Ben Cartwright was said to have built the original, smaller homestead after moving from New Orleans with his pregnant third wife Marie and his two sons, Adam and Hoss. The grown Adam, an architect/engineer, designed the later sprawling ranch house as depicted on TV (Bonanza, "The Philip Diedesheimer Story", Oct. 31, 1959, NBC-TV; Bonanza: The Return, April 1993, NBC-TV). The fictional ranch was roughly a two-hour horse ride from Virginia City, Nevada. (Note: There are slight variations as to the origin of the Ponderosa Ranch, from the original Bonanza series, Lorne Greene's 1964 song "Saga of the Ponderosa", the 1988–95 TV movies, and the 2001 PAX prequel series Ponderosa). The ranch house had a smaller second story; the interior set had only one story, but featured a false staircase by which actors could enter or leave the scene that seemingly led to a second floor. The bedroom scenes were filmed at Burbank Studios. David Dortort, the show's producer, said that the inspiration for the name was the large number of Ponderosa pines, which grow above 5,000 foot altitude, in the fictional ranch's location. A Latin derivation would be large (root of the English word ponderous). The exteriors for the television show were occasionally shot in Nevada, usually out of sequence. Crews were sometimes able to complete an entire season's work in just a few days.

The first Virginia City set used on the show from 1959–1970 was located on a back lot at Paramount. It was also used in episodes of Have Gun, Will Travel; Mannix; and The Brady Bunch. In the 1970 Bonanza episode "The Night Virginia City Died", Deputy Clem Foster's pyromaniac fiancée leveled the town in a series of fires. This allowed for a switch to the less-expensive Warner Studios from September 1970 through January 1973. Very few of the original Bonanza episodes were shot at the theme park's Virginia City site, although the town was prominently featured in three Bonanza television movies. Because the movies showcased the next generation of Cartwrights, they began circa 1905. The Ponderosa park expanded beyond the buggy era to include an exhibit featuring antique cars. It was a short-lived endeavor as tourists wanted to see horses flanked by Cartwright saddles.

=== Origins of the theme park ===
The idea for the theme park came about in 1965. Bill and Joyce Anderson owned a small horse ranch, which was located in about the same area as the fictional Ponderosa on the burning map. According to the Andersons, tourists would regularly show up at their gates asking where the Ponderosa was. Smelling opportunity, the Andersons contacted NBC and Bonanza creator-producer David Dortort. They proposed turning their small ranch into a theme park. NBC, Dortort, and the cast saw the tie-in as a "bonanza" for everyone. All parties being of one accord, the cast agreed to promos being shot at the ranch site and the Virginia City set – including the nearby Silver Dollar Saloon – for financial consideration. The ads stimulated revenue for the park.

The park opened to the public in 1968, complete with a scale replica of the Cartwright ranch house and barn similar to the ones seen on television. A replica of Virginia City was later added. The original plan was to open the set to tourists once filming had wrapped. However, shuttling cast and crew up to Incline Village on a weekly basis became cost-prohibitive. Thus, only 15 episodes of Bonanza were shot there. A majority of ranch-specific scenes were shot on a sound stage at Paramount Studios in Hollywood. Outdoor scenes were filmed on location at nearby Big Bear Lake, Red Rock Canyon, Mojave, or eastern Kern County, California. However, Michael Landon, Lorne Greene, Dan Blocker, and David Canary often made appearances at the ranch in costume to mingle with fans and sign autographs. Blocker died in 1972, and NBC canceled the series the following year. Canary, dressed in character as Candy, made his last visit there in 2002 for a PAX-TV special. Mitch Vogel (Jamie Cartwright) appeared at the ranch for the Travel Channel's "TV Road Trip" in 2002, in which he pitched a behind-the-scenes look at the Ponderosa Ranch and Incline Village. Copies of the "Ponderosa Map", autographed by three of the Cartwrights, became souvenirs at the ranch for decades afterward, along with tin cups bearing their likenesses. Episodes that were filmed entirely or in part at the ranch bear a title plate at the end of the credits. These episodes are from the tenth season through the end of the series (1968–73).

== The Ponderosa experience ==
Parking for visitors was at the highway level; only official vehicles, such as the park's Conestoga wagons, were allowed at the top of the ridge, where the park was located. Depending on the time of day, a park visit could include breakfast. Lunch, including a "Hoss Burger", could also be purchased. Estimates are that more than three million of these were sold during the park's existence.

A visit to the park consisted of visitors riding up on the wagon, being "robbed" by "outlaws", and then disembarking at the main house. Adjacent to the house were the "graves" of Ben Cartwright's three wives, each of whom had given birth to one of the three (half) brothers. Graves of the Cartwrights and cook Hop Sing were later added, following the deaths of Dan Blocker (1972), Victor Sen Yung (1980), Lorne Greene (1987), and Michael Landon (1991). The house contained a less-than-realistic carved figure of Ben Cartwright sitting at his desk, and of Hop Sing working in the kitchen. The only parts of the house that actually existed were the living room, dining room, kitchen, and office. The stairs led nowhere, as the "bedrooms" were actually located on a sound stage in Hollywood. Thus, the tour of the house took very little time.

The main attraction was the ranch's version of Virginia City, which was miles from the real Virginia City but immediately adjacent to the rear of the house set (on the show, the ranch was about a two-hour ride on horseback from Virginia City). There were activities such as a haunted house, panning for gold, amusements based on old-time Wild West shows, as well as concessions and souvenirs.

Only the front of the ranch house was ever shown on television because a highway ran directly to the right of the house. In episodes shot in-studio, the home exterior has a backdrop of sky and trees. The ranch house was a single-story structure, although from the outside it appeared to have a second story. Little Joe's green corduroy jacket and Hoss's brown suede vest were displayed hanging on a rack.

When the ranch opened in 1967, Pernell Roberts (Adam Cartwright) had long since departed the series. Consequently, he was not featured in Ponderosa's promotional campaign until after the show's initial run. At that time most of the shows broadcast in syndication featured the Adam Cartwright character. His picture was in the group painting on the sign promoting the park at the entrance. When the park folded in autumn 2004 Pernell Roberts was still alive, so no Adam grave marker was added. Pernell Roberts died on January 24, 2010.

Near the main house were sculptures of the horses ridden by Lorne Greene, Dan Blocker and Michael Landon that visitors could have their pictures taken either on or alongside of. The park also had a church that could be reserved for weddings near the church where the grave markers are located. In 1999, a VHS tour was made available to patrons. In 2002, David Canary appeared at the ranch in Candy's wardrobe for a special produced by PAX TV.

== Closure ==
The ranch and park remained a popular seasonal attraction for decades after the network run of Bonanza ended, having outlived most of the series' original cast. Business remained strong into the late 1990s. The land was purchased by billionaire software entrepreneur David Duffield in 2004. In September of that year he closed the Ponderosa "indefinitely". In 2020, it was sold for $38 million by Engel & Völkers, Inc.
