= David Dortort =

American screenwriter

- Born: David Solomon Katz; October 23, 1916; New York City, New York, U.S.
- Died: September 5, 2010 (aged 93); Los Angeles, California, U.S.
- Education: City College of New York, 1936
- Occupations: Writer; Television producer
- Years active: 1957–2001
- Spouse: Rose Seldin (m. 1940; died 2007)
- Children: 2

David Dortort (/ˈdɔːrtɔːr/ DOR-tor; born David Solomon Katz; October 23, 1916 – September 5, 2010) was a Hollywood screenwriter and producer, widely known for his role as producer in two successful NBC television series: Bonanza (1959–73) and The High Chaparral (1967–71). Dortort's focus shifted in the late 1960s to the newer series, leaving the production of Bonanza largely to his associates during its last five and a half years (1967–1973).

From 1954–55, Dortort was involved in directing and writing for The Public Defender. He produced The Restless Gun (1957–59), The Cowboys television version (1974), and a prequel series featuring younger versions of the Bonanza characters called Ponderosa (2001), which was produced with Beth Sullivan. In 1979–1980, he created the 13-week CBS miniseries, The Chisholms. Michael Landon appeared in a supporting role in the pilot for The Restless Gun, starring John Payne, aired on March 19, 1957, as an episode of The Schlitz Playhouse of Stars and Dan Blocker played multiple roles in five episodes of The Restless Gun.

Alan W. Livingston of NBC hired Dortort to write the screenplay for the pilot episode of Bonanza. He did it at night, while producing The Restless Gun by day.

In 2001, the alumni association of City College of New York, where he had studied history, honored him with its John H. Finley award.

== Personal life ==
A native of New York City, Dortort was married for 67 years to the former Rose Seldin, who died September 30, 2007, at age 92. They had two children, Wendy Dortort Czarnecki and Fred Dortort.

== Death ==
Dortort died in his sleep at his home in Los Angeles, California, on September 5, 2010, a month and a half before his 94th birthday, following a history of heart disease.

== Writings ==
Dortort published two books, Burial of the Fruit in 1947 and The Post of Honor in 1949.

== Filmography ==
=== Films ===
Year	Film	Credit	Notes
1952	The Lusty Men	Screenplay By	Based on the novel "King of the Cowpokes" by "Claude Stanush"
1956	A Cry in the Night	Screenplay By	Based on the novel "All Through the Night" by "Whit Masterson"
1956	Reprisal!	Screenplay By	
1957	The Big Land	Screenplay By	Based on the novel "Buffalo Grass" by "Frank Gruber"
1958	A Gift for Heidi	Screenplay By	
1987	Going Bananas	Executive Producer	
1988	Bonanza: The Next Generation	Produced By	Television Movie
1993	Bonanza: The Return	Story By, Executive Producer	Television Movie
1995	Bonanza: Under Attack	Executive Producer	Television Movie

=== Television ===
Year	TV Series	Credit	Notes
1952	Cavalcade of America	Writer	2 episodes
1952–54	Fireside Theatre	Writer	5 episodes
1953	Racket Squad	Writer	1 Episode
1954	Climax!	Writer	1 episode
1954–55	Public Defender	Writer	3 episodes
1954–55	Waterfront	Writer	8 episodes
1955	TV Reader's Digest	Writer	1 Episode
1955	The 20th Century Fox Hour	Writer	1 Episode
1956	Screen Directors Playhouse	Writer	1 Episode
1956	Lassie	Writer	1 Episode
1956–57	Studio 57	Writer	2 episodes
1957	Panic!	Writer	1 Episode
1957–59	The Restless Gun	Writer, producer	77 episodes
1959–73	Bonanza	Writer, Creator, Producer, Executive Producer	Multiple Episodes
1967–71	The High Chaparral	Writer, Creator, Producer, Executive Producer	Multiple Episodes
1974	The Cowboys	Producer	
1979–80	The Chisholms	Writer, Creator, Executive Producer	14 episodes
2001–02	Ponderosa	Producer	
