= Bonanza season 4 =

Bonanza
- Season 4
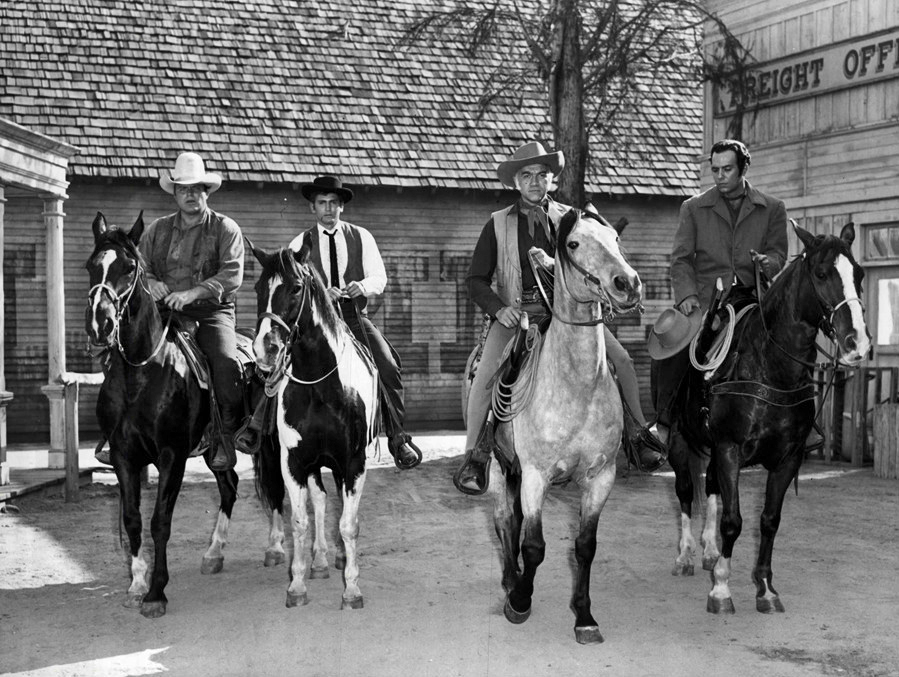
- Cast of Bonanza in 1959
- Starring: Lorne Greene; Pernell Roberts; Dan Blocker; Michael Landon
- No. of episodes: 34

Release
- Original network: NBC
- Original release: September 23, 1962 – May 26, 1963

Season chronology
- ← Previous; Season 3 Next → Season 5

The fourth season of the American Western television series Bonanza premiered on NBC on September 23, 1962, with the final episode airing May 26, 1963. The series was developed and produced by David Dortort, and season four starred Lorne Greene, Pernell Roberts, Dan Blocker, and Michael Landon. The season consisted of 34 episodes of a series total 431 hour-long episodes, the entirety of which was produced in color. Season four was aired on Sundays at 9:00 p.m. It ranked #4 in the Nielsen ratings, the highest rated Western for the 1962–1963 season.

== Synopsis ==
Bonanza is set around the Ponderosa Ranch near Virginia City, Nevada and chronicles the weekly adventures of the Cartwright family, consisting of Ben Cartwright and his three sons (each by a different wife), Adam, Eric ("Hoss"), and Joseph ("Little Joe"). A regular character is their ranch cook, Hop Sing.

== Cast and characters ==
=== Main cast ===
- Lorne Greene as Ben Cartwright
- Pernell Roberts as Adam Cartwright
- Dan Blocker as Eric "Hoss" Cartwright
- Michael Landon as Joseph "Little Joe" Cartwright

=== Recurring ===
- Victor Sen Yung as Hop Sing
- Ray Teal as Sheriff Roy Coffee
- Bing Russell as Deputy Clem Foster

=== Guest cast ===
- James Bell
- Jack Betts
- George Brenlin
- Alan Caillou
- Eileen Chesis
- Barry Coe
- Don Collier
- Jeanne Cooper
- Ellen Corby
- Aneta Corsaut
- Patricia Crowley
- Kathleen Crowley
- William Demarest
- Michael Davis
- John Doucette
- Keir Dullea
- Robert Emhardt
- Jena Engstrom
- Felicia Farr
- Lee Farr
- John Fiedler
- Frank Gerstle
- Larrian Gillespie
- Leo Gordon
- Virginia Grey
- Don Haggerty
- Signe Hasso
- Ron Hayes
- John Hoyt
- Arthur Hunnicutt
- Chubby Johnson
- Betsy Jones-Moreland
- Barry Kelley
- DeForest Kelley
- Will Kuluva
- John Larkin
- Ruta Lee
- Perry Lopez
- Ken Lynch
- Ross Martin
- Judi Meredith
- Toby Michaels
- Carroll O'Connor
- Dan O'Herlihy
- Simon Oakland
- Slim Pickens
- Edward Platt
- Denver Pyle
- Ford Rainey
- Carl Reindel
- Addison Richards
- Grant Richards
- Dan Riss
- Robert Sampson
- Evelyn Scott
- Harvey Stephens
- Joyce Taylor
- Harry Townes
- Robert Vaughn
- Gregory Walcott
- Bobs Watson
- Dawn Wells
- Helen Westcott

== Production ==
=== Casting ===
Bing Russell was added to the series as recurring character Deputy Clem Foster beginning with episode 18, "Half a Rouge".

=== Filming ===
On location filming for season four took place at Incline Village for episode 1, "The First Born"; episode 2, "The Quest", and episode 7, "The War Comes to Washoe". Additional locations were Griffith Park for episode 29, "Five into the Wind", and Bronson Canyon for episode 32, "Rich Man, Poor Man"

== Episodes ==
Bonanza, season 4 episodes
| No. overall | No. in season | Title | Directed by | Written by | Original release date |
|---|---|---|---|---|---|
| 101 | 1 | "The First Born" | Don McDougall | Judy and George W. George | September 23, 1962 |
Joe must decide what to do when he learns that new ranch hand Clay Stafford (Barry Coe) is his mother's first-born son.
| 102 | 2 | "The Quest" | Christian Nyby | John Furia^{[A]} and Thomas Thompson | September 30, 1962 |
In order to prove himself a man, Joe sets out to win a big timber contract for the Ponderosa. Grant Richards, Frank Gerstle and Dan Riss guest star.
| 103 | 3 | "The Artist" | Don McDougall | Frank Chase | October 7, 1962 |
Ben tries to help Matthew Raine (Dan O'Herlihy), an artist who's lost his sight. He's also supported by his friend Ann (Virginia Grey).
| 104 | 4 | "A Hot Day for a Hanging" | William F. Claxton | Preston Wood and Elliott Arnold | October 14, 1962 |
A sheriff (Denver Pyle) hopes to save his town from going bankrupt by framing Hoss for bank robbery and murder while he's making a payment delivery.
| 105 | 5 | "The Deserter" | William Witney | Norman Lessing | October 21, 1962 |
The Cartwrights face a dilemma when their neighbor Bill Winters (Robert Sampson) is wanted for deserting the Army ten years ago.
| 106 | 6 | "The Way Station" | Lewis Allen | Frank Cleaver | October 28, 1962 |
A desperate fugitive (Robert Vaughn) holds Adam and others captive at a remote way station. Dawn Wells guest stars as Martha "Marty" Johnson.
| 107 | 7 | "The War Comes to Washoe" | Don McDougall | Alvin Sapinsley | November 4, 1962 |
Statehood convention delegates debate over which side Nevada will take in the Civil War. Little Joe's romance with the daughter of a Confederate sympathizer brings tensions between him and Adam. Harry Townes, Joyce Taylor, Barry Kelley and Alan Caillou guest star.
| 108 | 8 | "Knight Errant" | William F. Claxton | Joseph Hoffman | November 18, 1962 |
Hoss inadvertently starts a romantic triangle when he meets his friend's mail-order bride, who falls in love with him. Judi Meredith and John Doucette guest star.
| 109 | 9 | "The Beginning" | Christian Nyby | Preston Wood | November 25, 1962 |
Joe tries to help Billy Horn (Carl Reindel), who was captured by Indians as a boy, adjust to life at the Ponderosa. A threat emerges when Milton Tanner (Ken Lynch) claims one-third of the Ponderosa and Billy wants to confront him the Indian way.
| 110 | 10 | "The Deadly Ones" | William Witney | Story by : N. B. Stone Jr. Teleplay by : Denne Petitclerc | December 2, 1962 |
Mexican patriots loyal to Benito Juárez come to the Ponderosa in order to rob a gold wagon needed for the Mexican revolution and smuggled by Emperor Maximilian. Will Kuluva, Leo Gordon, Lee Farr and Jena Engstrom guest star.
| 111 | 11 | "Gallagher's Sons" | Christian Nyby | Dick Nelson | December 9, 1962 |
Hoss helps out Will (Eileen Chesis) and Charlie (Larrian Gillespie), two orphaned girls who have been raised as boys. He doesn't know a posse is trailing them, looking for a bag of stolen money carried by one of the girls.
| 112 | 12 | "The Decision" | William F. Claxton | Story by : Norman Jacob; Teleplay by : Frank Chase | December 16, 1962 |
A doctor (DeForest Kelley) convicted of murder is the only one who can perform surgery on Hoss, whose life hangs in the balance at the hands of a biased judge (John Hoyt).
| 113 | 13 | "The Good Samaritan" | Don McDougall | Robert Bloomfield | December 23, 1962 |
Hoss tries to play matchmaker for a ranch hand (Don Collier) and a widow (Jeanne Cooper). His friend seems determined to sabotage the possible affair.
| 114 | 14 | "The Jury" | Christian Nyby | Robert Vincent Wright | December 30, 1962 |
Hoss is the only one on a jury who believes a ne'er-do-well is innocent of murder. Since he doesn't agree with the other judges, he's accused of bribery. Jack Betts, Don Haggerty, James Bell and Bobs Watson guest star.
| 115 | 15 | "The Colonel" | Lewis Allen | Preston Wood | January 6, 1963 |
An old Army buddy of Ben's jeopardizes the Cartwrights and a Ponderosa land deal with his lies. John Larkin, Helen Westcott and Edward Platt guest star.
| 116 | 16 | "Song in the Dark" | Don McDougall | Judy and George W. George | January 13, 1963 |
Mysterious singer Danny Morgan (Gregory Walcott) has been charged with murder and Adam sets out to clear him.
| 117 | 17 | "Elegy for a Hangman" | Hollingsworth Morse | Story by : E. M. Parsons; Teleplay by : E. M. Parsons and Shirl Hendryx | January 20, 1963 |
A man (Keir Dullea) forces the reopening of a murder case, believing his father was wrongfully executed. Adam helps him.
| 118 | 18 | "Half a Rogue" | Don McDougall | Arnold Belgard | January 27, 1963 |
Hoss takes in ornery hillbilly Big Jim Leyton (Slim Pickens), who has been framed for murder.
| 119 | 19 | "The Last Haircut" | William F. Claxton | Charles Lang | February 3, 1963 |
Joe pursues a cold-blooded killer who used a tricky legal maneuver to escape justice. Perry Lopez and Chubby Johnson guest star.
| 120 | 20 | "Marie, My Love" | Lewis Allen | Story by : Anne Howard Bailey and Anthony Lawrence; Teleplay by : Anthony Lawrence | February 10, 1963 |
Ben remembers his courtship in New Orleans of Joe's mother and third wife, Marie (Felicia Farr).
| 121 | 21 | "The Hayburner" | William F. Claxton | Alex Sharp | February 17, 1963 |
Hoss loses his Kentucky racehorse in a poker game and he wants it back. The Cartwright brothers try to come out ahead in the Virginia City Sweepstakes. William Demarest and Ellen Corby guest star.
| 122 | 22 | "The Actress" | Christian Nyby | Norman Lessing | February 24, 1963 |
An actress (Patricia Crowley) is torn between her love for little Joe and her desire for show business.
| 123 | 23 | "A Stranger Passed This Way" | Lewis Allen | William L. Stuart | March 3, 1963 |
Hoss develops amnesia following a bushwhacking and is taken in by a Dutch couple mourning their son's death. They plan to take him to Michigan with them. Signe Hasso, Robert Emhardt and Addison Richards guest star.
| 124 | 24 | "The Way of Aaron" | Murray Golden | Raphael David Blau | March 10, 1963 |
Adam falls for a Jewish woman (Aneta Corsaut) after helping her and her father.
| 125 | 25 | "A Woman Lost" | Don McDougall | Frank Chase | March 17, 1963 |
Ben and an ex-prizefighter try to cure a woman (Ruta Lee) of her alcoholism.
| 126 | 26 | "Any Friend of Walter's" | John Florea | Lois Hire | March 24, 1963 |
Hoss befriends an old prospector (Arthur Hunnicutt) and his communicative dog as he helps them fend off gold thieves.
| 127 | 27 | "Mirror of a Man" | Lewis Allen | A. I. Bezzerides | March 31, 1963 |
A reformed convict is forced to switch identities with his evil twin, who is wanted for murdering a rancher and stealing a horse. Ron Hayes and Ford Rainey guest star.
| 128 | 28 | "My Brother's Keeper" | Murray Golden | Seeleg Lester | April 7, 1963 |
Adam considers rejecting the violent way of life in the West after shooting Joe by accident. Ken Lynch guest stars.
| 129 | 29 | "Five into the Wind" | William F. Claxton | Meyer Dolinsky | April 21, 1963 |
Joe and five people are stranded after a stagecoach wreck. Joe is accused of murder when a man is found killed by Joe's knife. Kathleen Crowley and Betsy Jones-Moreland guest star.
| 130 | 30 | "The Saga of Whizzer McGee" | Don McDougall | Robert L. Welch | April 28, 1963 |
Hoss befriends Whizzer McGee (George Brenlin), a little man with big ideas.
| 131 | 31 | "Thunder Man" | Lewis Allen | Lewis Reed | May 5, 1963 |
Joe's girlfriend Ann Wilson (Toby Michaels) and her uncle Fred (Harvey Stephens) are going to Joe's birthday party, but the girl is molested and killed by explosives expert William Poole (Simon Oakland) who then works to keep his guilt secret by getting a job on the Ponderosa and staying with widowed neighbor Mrs. Gibson (Evelyn Scott).
| 132 | 32 | "Rich Man, Poor Man" | John Florea | Story by : Arnold Belgard and Robert Fresco; Teleplay by : Richard P. McDonagh, Barbara and Milton Merlin | May 12, 1963 |
Bumbling man Claude Miller (John Fiedler) loses his job and then tries to buy respect with his new-found wealth.
| 133 | 33 | "The Boss" | Arthur H. Nadel | Leo Gordon and Paul Leslie Peil | May 19, 1963 |
The Cartwrights attempt to start a rally against the tyrannical owner (Carroll O'Connor) of a freight-line. The local strongman is also a former friend of Ben.
| 134 | 34 | "Little Man... Ten Feet Tall" | Lewis Allen | Story by : Eric Norden and Frank Arno; Teleplay by : Eric Norden | May 26, 1963 |
An Italian immigrant loses respect for his father (Ross Martin) when he meets Hoss.

== Release ==
Season four aired on Sundays from 9:00 pm–10:00 pm on NBC.

== Reception ==
Season four ranked #4 in the Nielsen ratings, the highest rated Western for the 1962–1963 season.

=== Awards and nominations ===
| Award | Year (Note: Indicates the year of ceremony.) | Category | Nominee(s) / Work | Result | Ref(s) |
|---|---|---|---|---|---|
| Primetime Creative Arts Emmy Awards | 1963 | Outstanding Achievement in Art Direction and Scenic Design | Earl Hedrick (scenic designer) and Hal Pereira (art director) | Nominated | |
