= Bonanza season 1 =

Bonanza
- Season 1
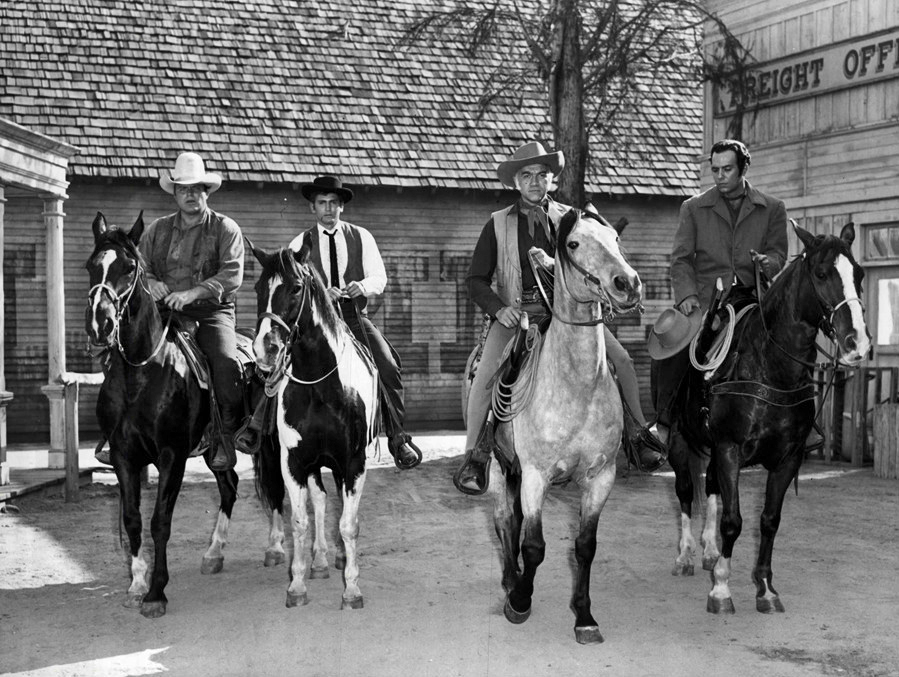
- Cast of Bonanza in 1959
- Starring: Lorne Greene; Pernell Roberts; Dan Blocker; Michael Landon
- No. of episodes: 32

Release
- Original network: NBC
- Original release: September 12, 1959 – April 30, 1960

Season chronology
- Next → Season 2

The first season of the American Western television series Bonanza premiered on NBC on September 12, 1959, with the final episode airing April 30, 1960. The series was developed and produced by David Dortort, and season one starred Lorne Greene, Pernell Roberts, Dan Blocker, and Michael Landon. The season consisted of 32 episodes of the series's total 431 hour-long episodes, the entirety of which was produced in color. It aired on Saturdays from 7:30 pm–8:30 pm on NBC and placed at number 45 in the Nielsen ratings.

== Synopsis ==
Bonanza is set around the Ponderosa Ranch near Virginia City, Nevada and chronicles the weekly adventures of the Cartwright family, consisting of Ben Cartwright and his three sons (each by a different wife), Adam, Eric ("Hoss"), and Joseph ("Little Joe"). A regular character is their ranch cook, Hop Sing.

== Cast and characters ==
=== Main cast ===
- Lorne Greene as Ben Cartwright
- Pernell Roberts as Adam Cartwright
- Dan Blocker as Eric "Hoss" Cartwright
- Michael Landon as Joseph "Little Joe" Cartwright

=== Recurring ===
- Victor Sen Yung as Hop Sing

=== Guest stars ===
- Philip Ahn
- Claude Akins
- Lewis Allen
- John Anderson
- Edward Ashley
- Raymond Bailey
- John Beal
- Alma Beltran
- Whitney Blake
- Sebastian Cabot
- Harry Carey Jr.
- Paul Carr
- Jack Carson
- Anthony Caruso
- James Coburn
- Ellen Corby
- Ricardo Cortez
- Walter Coy
- Hazel Court
- Kathleen Crowley
- Yvonne De Carlo
- Richard Deacon
- Philip Deidesheimer
- Don Dubbins
- Howard Duff
- Buddy Ebsen
- Chana Eden
- Bert Freed
- Jane Greer
- Alan Hale Jr.
- Stacy Harris
- Susan Harrison
- Adrienne Hayes
- James Hong
- Henry Hull
- Arthur Hunnicutt
- David Ladd
- John Larch
- Wesley Lau
- John Litel
- Jack Lord
- Ida Lupino
- George Macready
- Joe Maross
- Patricia Medina
- Don Megowan
- Adah Menkin
- Robert Middleton
- John Milford
- Mort Mills
- Cameron Mitchell
- George Mitchell
- Vic Morrow
- Lloyd Nolan
- Susan Oliver
- Paul Picerni
- Steve Rowland
- Ruth Roman
- Everett Sloane
- Fay Spain
- Inger Stevens
- Onslow Stevens
- Barry Sullivan
- Karl Swenson
- Gloria Talbott
- Jack Warden
- Helen Westcott
- David White
- Jean Willes
- Adam Williams
- Grant Williams
- Rhys Williams
- Ian Wolfe
- Morgan Woodward

== Production ==
=== Development ===
By 1959, RCA had made progress in producing color television, but American consumers were not adopting the new technology. As the owner of NBC, they sought to produce a pioneer color program. David Dortort created the concept as an hour-long show. It was the first Western to be released in color.

Season one, episode 26, "The Avenger", was the pilot for an unsold spinoff.

=== Casting ===
The character of Hoss was the first to be cast, then Little Joe, with Michael Landon being chosen to appeal to the teenage audience. Dortort had worked with both of the actors in The Restless Gun. After seeing Lorne Greene on an episode of Wagon Train, Dortort chose him for the role of Ben Cartwright, having felt Greene had the qualities he was seeking for the family patriarch. Originally, Dortort wanted Guy Williams for the role of Adam, but he was already committed to Disney's Zorro at the time, so Pernell Roberts was cast instead.

NBC originally wanted guest stars, but the costs of filming the show in color cut into the budget significantly. Instead, Dortort would select a guest cast of unknowns.

=== Writing ===
Dortort had input on most of the script writing. He was credited with four of the scripts in the first season.

=== Production design ===
Sets were designed by Hal Pereira, Earl Hedrick, and David Dortort. Set decoration was handled by Grace Gregory.

=== Filming ===
Dortort originally planned to shoot on location, but film costs related to color production also cut into the budget for filming, resulting in the compromise of filming annually in the Sierra Nevada mountains. Most of the filming was done at Paramount Studios.

Other filming locations included:

- Los Angeles and surrounding areas (episode 1)
- Iverson Movie Ranch (episodes 2, 4)
- Big Bear, California (episodes 3, 11, 15)
- Bronson Canyon (episode 7)

=== Music ===
Jay Livingston and Ray Evans wrote the original theme song. It was originally planned that the leads would sing the lyrics while riding out of Virginia City, but ultimately, the song was used instrumentally. Dortort, not liking the lyrics, agreed to use the song under the provision that it would not be used within the episodes. Dortort selected composer David Rose to write the music for the show, who scored the show's music with a 35 member orchestra.

== Themes ==
The show focused more on relationships than gun fights. It also tackled social issues. "The Fear Merchants" addressed bigotry against Chinese immigrants.

Occasionally, scripts would be based on true events, albeit loosely, as often the historical events would not have taken place in the time period of the show. "The Paiute War" was based on the Paiute War that occurred in May and June 1860. "The Julia Bulette Story" was based on the murder of Julia Bulette, which occurred in 1867 in Virginia City. "The Saga of Annie O'Toole" was based on true events. "The Philip Deidesheimer Story" tells the story of Philip Deidesheimer's work developing square-set mining in the Comstock Lode's Ophir Mine in Virginia City in 1860.

== Episodes ==
Bonanza, season 1 episodes
No. overall	No. in season	Title	Directed by	Written by	Original release date
1	1	"A Rose for Lotta"	Edward Ludwig	David Dortort	September 12, 1959
2	2	"Death on Sun Mountain"	Paul Landres	Gene L. Coon and David Dortort	September 19, 1959
3	3	"The Newcomers"	Christian Nyby	Thomas Thompson	September 26, 1959
4	4	"The Paiute War"	Paul Landres	Gene L. Coon	October 3, 1959
5	5	"Enter Mark Twain"	Paul Landres	Harold Shumate	October 10, 1959
6	6	"The Julia Bulette Story"	Christian Nyby	Al C. Ward	October 17, 1959
7	7	"The Saga of Annie O'Toole"	Joseph Kane	Thomas Thompson	October 24, 1959
8	8	"The Philip Deidesheimer Story"	Joseph Kane	Thomas Thompson	October 31, 1959
9	9	"Mr. Henry Comstock"	John Brahm	David Dortort	November 7, 1959
10	10	"The Magnificent Adah"	Christian Nyby	Donald S. Sanford	November 14, 1959
11	11	"The Truckee Strip"	Christian Nyby	Herman Groves	November 21, 1959
12	12	"The Hanging Posse"	Christian Nyby	Carey Wilber	November 28, 1959
13	13	"Vendetta"	Joseph Kane	Robert E. Thompson	December 5, 1959
14	14	"The Sisters"	Christian Nyby	Carey Wilber	December 12, 1959
15	15	"The Last Hunt"	Christian Nyby	Donald S. Sanford	December 19, 1959
16	16	"El Toro Grande"	Christian Nyby	John Tucker Battle	January 2, 1960
17	17	"The Outcast"	Lewis Allen	Thomas Thompson	January 9, 1960
18	18	"A House Divided"	Lewis Allen	Al C. Ward	January 16, 1960
19	19	"The Gunmen"	Christian Nyby	Carey Wilber	January 23, 1960
20	20	"The Fear Merchants"	Lewis Allen	Story by : Frank Unger; Teleplay by : Frank Unger and Thomas Thompson	January 30, 1960
21	21	"The Spanish Grant"	Christian Nyby	Story by : Morris Lee Green; Teleplay by : Leonard Heideman and David Dortort	February 6, 1960
22	22	"Blood on the Land"	Felix Feist	Robert E. Thompson	February 13, 1960
23	23	"Desert Justice"	Lewis Allen	Donald S. Sanford	February 20, 1960
24	24	"The Stranger"	Christian Nyby	Story by : Oliver Crawford; Teleplay by : Leonard Heideman	February 27, 1960
25	25	"Escape to Ponderosa"	Charles F. Haas	Story by : Bill Barrett and Malcolm Stuart Boylan; Teleplay by : Robert E. Thompson	March 5, 1960
26	26	"The Avenger"	Christian Nyby	Clair Huffaker	March 19, 1960
27	27	"The Last Trophy"	Lewis Allen	Bill S. Ballinger	March 26, 1960
28	28	"San Francisco"	Arthur Lubin	Thomas Thompson	April 2, 1960
29	29	"Bitter Water"	George Blair	Harold Jack Bloom	April 9, 1960
30	30	"Feet of Clay"	Arthur Lubin	John Furia Jr.	April 16, 1960
31	31	"Dark Star"	Lewis Allen	Anthony Lawrence	April 23, 1960
32	32	"Death at Dawn"	Charles Haas	Laurence E. Mascott	April 30, 1960

== Release ==
The season aired on Saturdays from 7:30 pm–8:30 pm on NBC. The timeslot was deliberate. It was a time when many people were shopping in department stores, and they could see the show displayed on color televisions at period when color television sets had not yet been widely adopted. However, many people watching at home were still tuning in to Perry Mason in that timeslot.

== Reception ==
The first season lost the Saturday night ratings to Perry Mason. Released at a time when television was saturated with Westerns, the premier episode garnered the following review from Variety:

Another western is just what Saturday night television needs least, and that's what Bonanza appears to be -- just another western. For all its pretensions, with a large cast, name guests, color and an hour's length, proves to be little more than a patch work of stock oater ideas without a fresh twist to distinguish it...

Poor ratings and high production costs led to NBC considering cancellation early in the process, leading to rumors that the show actually was cancelled; but fans wrote in and NBC realized it did have a viable audience.

The first season of the series failed to break the Nielsen ranking top 30.
