= Bonanza season 2 =

Bonanza
- Season 2
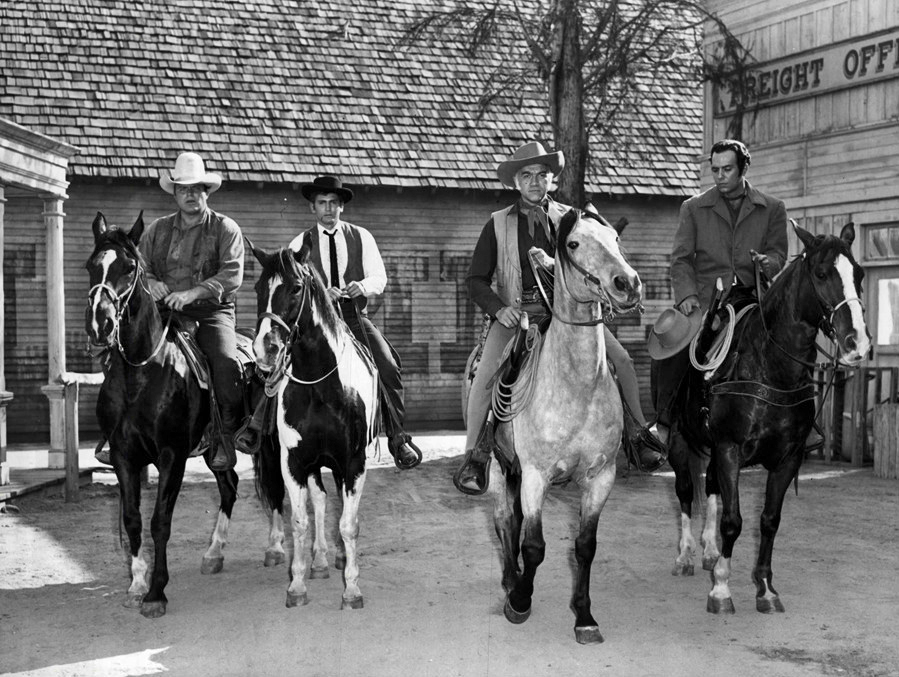
- Cast of Bonanza in 1959
- Starring: Lorne Greene; Pernell Roberts; Dan Blocker; Michael Landon
- No. of episodes: 34

Release
- Original network: NBC
- Original release: September 10, 1960 – June 3, 1961

Season chronology
- ← Previous; Season 1 Next → Season 3

The second season of the American Western television series Bonanza premiered on NBC on September 10, 1960, with the final episode airing June 3, 1961. The series was developed and produced by David Dortort, and season two starred Lorne Greene, Pernell Roberts, Dan Blocker, and Michael Landon. The season consisted of 34 episodes of the series's total 431 hour-long episodes, the entirety of which was produced in color. It aired on Saturdays from 7:30 pm–8:30 pm on NBC and placed at number 17 in the Nielsen ratings.

== Synopsis ==
Bonanza is set around the Ponderosa Ranch near Virginia City, Nevada and chronicles the weekly adventures of the Cartwright family, consisting of Ben Cartwright and his three sons (each by a different wife), Adam, Eric ("Hoss"), and Joseph ("Little Joe"). A regular character is their ranch cook, Hop Sing. A new recurring character is added, sheriff Roy Coffee.

== Cast and characters ==
=== Main cast ===
- Lorne Greene as Ben Cartwright
- Pernell Roberts as Adam Cartwright
- Dan Blocker as Eric "Hoss" Cartwright
- Michael Landon as Joseph "Little Joe" Cartwright

=== Recurring ===
- Victor Sen Yung as Hop Sing
- Ray Teal as Sheriff Roy Coffee

=== Guest stars ===
- Julie Adams
- Charles Aidman
- Claude Akins
- Anna-Lisa
- Val Avery
- Parley Baer
- Bob Barker
- Arthur Batanides
- James Best
- Sidney Blackmer
- Neville Brand
- Geraldine Brooks
- Edgar Buchanan
- James Coburn
- Richard Coogan
- Ben Cooper
- Richard Davalos
- John Dehner
- Crahan Denton
- Patricia Donahue
- Dan Duryea
- Jack Elam
- Ross Elliott
- Leif Erickson
- John Ericson
- Jason Evers
- Myrna Fahey
- Eddie Firestone
- Dianne Foster
- Peggy Ann Garner
- Larry Gates
- Nora Hayden
- Henry Hull
- George Kennedy
- June Kenney
- Martin Landau
- Robert Lansing
- Barbara Lawrence
- Robert Maffei
- Gerald Mohr
- Ricardo Montalbán
- Leonard Nimoy
- Stuart Nisbet
- J. Pat O'Malley
- Dennis Patrick
- Judson Pratt
- Ford Rainey
- Maxwell Reed
- Stafford Repp
- Madlyn Rhue
- Keith Richards
- Ziva Rodann
- Jackie Russell
- Eddie Ryder
- Vito Scotti
- Karen Sharpe
- Frank Silvera
- Jan Sterling
- Stella Stevens
- Randy Stuart
- Karl Swenson
- Dan Tobin
- Franchot Tone
- Harry Townes
- Natalie Trundy
- Beverly Tyler
- Lee Van Cleef
- Katherine Warren
- Adam West
- Adam Williams
- Ian Wolfe

== Production ==
Being in the same timeslot as Perry Mason, it took some time for the show to catch on. NBC saw improvement in the ratings toward the end of the premiere season and so renewed the series for another season.

Episode 34, "Sam Hill", was the pilot episode for an unsold spinoff.

=== Casting ===
Ray Teal was added as recurring character Sheriff Roy Coffee.

=== Filming ===
Episode 8 of the season, "The Abduction", was filmed entirely on a Paramount soundstage. Location shooting for episode 12, "The Savage", took place at Franklin lake in Hollywood and Iverson's Movie Ranch. Iverson's Movie Ranch was also used for episode 23, "The Rescue". Red Rock Canyon was used for episode 24, "The Dark Gate" and episode 27, "The Gift". Episode 30, "Thunderhead Swindle", was filmed at Bronson Canyon.

== Episodes ==
Bonanza, season 2 episodes
No. overall	No. in season	Title	Directed by	Written by	Original release date
33	1	"Showdown"	Lewis Allen	Dean Riesner	September 10, 1960
The youngest member (Ben Cooper) of a gang that has just robbed Virginia City's bank takes a job with the Cartwrights so the sheriff doesn't find his accomplices.
34	2	"The Mission"	James Neilson	Robert E. Thompson	September 17, 1960
Hoss befriends Charlie Trent (Henry Hull), the town drunk who was once a top scout in the Army before he led his troops into a massacre. Hoss helps him regain his self-esteem. John Dehner guest stars.
35	3	"Badge Without Honor"	Arthur Lubin	John Twist	September 24, 1960
The Cartwrights grow suspicious of U.S. Deputy Marshall Gerald Eskith (Dan Duryea), assigned to escort a reluctant witness, who is also a close friend of theirs, to a racketeering trial in San Francisco.
36	4	"The Mill"	John Rich	Halsted Welles	October 1, 1960
The Cartwrights offer to build a mill for their paraplegic neighbor Tom Edwards (Harry Townes) and his wife Joyce (Dianne Foster), who is a longtime friend of Ben. Tom's hired hand, Ezekiel (Claude Akins), is suspicious of Ben.
37	5	"The Hopefuls"	James Neilson	E. Jack Neuman	October 8, 1960
A Quaker woman convinces Adam to take her wagon train on a perilous journey west. He doesn't know that the woman's father has eyes on the gold that they are carrying to the promised land. Larry Gates, Patricia Donahue and Dennis Patrick guest star.
38	6	"Denver McKee"	Jacques Tourneur	Fred Freiberger and Steve McNeil	October 15, 1960
Retired U.S. Deputy Marshall Denver McKee (Franchot Tone) is willing to do anything to make his daughter (Natalie Trundy) happy. Bob Barker guest stars.
39	7	"Day of Reckoning"	Richard H. Bartlett	Story by : Leonard Heideman; Teleplay by : Leonard Heideman and R. Harner Norris	October 22, 1960
A bigoted and racist farmer (Karl Swenson) takes action when Ben gives an Indian a piece of land as a reward for saving his life. Ricardo Montalbán and Madlyn Rhue guest star.
40	8	"The Abduction"	Charles Haas	Herman Groves	October 29, 1960
Joe's carnival date Jennifer Beale (Jackie Russell) is abducted in a deadly ransom plot orchestrated to extort money from her rich father Joshua. The plan unravels when Hercules (Robert Maffei) finds out who killed the woman he loved, Delia (Barbara Lawrence). Gerald Mohr and Stafford Repp guest star.
41	9	"Breed of Violence"	Johnny Florea	David Lang	November 5, 1960
Dolly Kincaid (Myrna Fahey) defies her lawman father (Val Avery) and runs off with a handsome stranger (John Ericson) who is actually a bank robber.
42	10	"The Last Viking"	Johnny Florea	Anthony Lawrence	November 12, 1960
Hoss's uncle Gunnar (Neville Brand) turns out to be the leader of a vicious band of outlaws called the Commancheros that kidnaps Little Joe and his girlfriend.
43	11	"The Trail Gang"	John Rich	Carey Wilber	November 26, 1960
Outlaw Johnny Logan (Richard Davalos) plots his revenge against his sheriff-father (James Westerfield) for sending him to prison years ago. To succeed, he disguises as Sam Jackson, a young drifter hired by Ben, who isn't aware of Johnny's real identity. Edgar Buchanan guest stars.
44	12	"The Savage"	James Neilson	Joseph Stone and Paul King	December 3, 1960
Adam falls for a girl (Anna-Lisa) believed by Indians to be the white buffalo woman. The tribe wants to harm her and is looking for her.
45	13	"Silent Thunder"	Robert Altman	John Furia Jr.	December 10, 1960
A deaf girl (Stella Stevens) is treated badly by her father and Joe decides to help her by teaching her sign language. The girl misunderstands Joe's actions as gestures of love.
46	14	"The Ape"	James P. Yarbrough	Gene L. Coon	December 17, 1960
Hoss tries to help a mentally-challenged man with immense physical strength to control his temper. His efforts are undermined by a saloon girl. Karen Sharpe and Leonard Nimoy guest star.
47	15	"The Blood Line"	Lewis Allen	William Raynor and Myles Wilder	December 31, 1960
Todd Grayson (David Macklin) seeks revenge on Ben for the death of his father Luke. Jan Sterling and Lee Van Cleef guest star.
48	16	"The Courtship"	James P. Yarbrough	Richard Morgan	January 7, 1961
Hoss falls in love and proposes to a beautiful woman (Julie Adams) Adam knows is a compulsive gambler and only interested in Hoss' money.
49	17	"The Spitfire"	William D. Faralla	Ward Hawkins	January 14, 1961
A family seeks revenge against Joe for shooting the treacherous patriarch in self-defense after the man tried to set fire to the Ponderosa. Jack Elam and Katherine Warren guest star.
50	18	"The Bride"	Alvin Ganzer	Richard Newman	January 21, 1961
A beautiful young woman (Suzanne Lloyd) claims to be Ben's wife and a sheriff (John McIntire) falsely charges him with murder - all in a complex scheme to take over the Ponderosa. Adam West guest stars.
51	19	"Bank Run"	Robert Altman	N.B. Stone Jr.	January 28, 1961
Joe and Hoss rob the bank in an attempt to stop the owner from foreclosing on a depositor, but they end up being pursued by the law. Dan Tobin and Ian Wolfe guest star.
52	20	"The Fugitive"	Lewis Allen	Richard H. Landau	February 4, 1961
Adam investigates a friend's death in Mexico, only to be faced with hostile townspeople and the dead man's wife. Ziva Rodann, James Best, Frank Silvera and Arthur Batanides guest star.
53	21	"Vengeance"	Dick Moder	Marion Parsonnet	February 11, 1961
Hoss is shot by the vengeful brother (Adam Williams) of the man he accidentally killed, Willie the town drunk (Keith Richards). Beverly Tyler guest stars.
54	22	"Tax Collector"	William Witney	Arnold Belgard	February 18, 1961
The citizens of Virginia City unite to rebel against the new tax collector Jock Henry (Eddie Firestone), who uses peculiar methods to figure out how much people owe.
55	23	"The Rescue"	William D. Faralla	Steve McNeil	February 25, 1961
Ben must rescue his sons from cattle rustlers. Leif Erickson and Richard Coogan guest star.
56	24	"The Dark Gate"	Robert Gordon	Ward Hawkins	March 4, 1961
Rancher Ross Marquette (James Coburn) is behaving strangely and he accuses his friend Adam of having an affair with his wife.
57	25	"The Duke"	Robert Altman	Story by : Theodore & Mathilde Ferro; Teleplay by : William R. Cox	March 11, 1961
A British boxer called the Duke (Maxwell Reed) with a weakness for the ladies faces Hoss in a prizefight. JD (Jason Evers), the Cartwrights' meek friend, is pulverized by the Duke who also assaults Marge (Randy Stuart), a saloon girl who adores JD. The Duke's manager (J. Pat O'Malley), who is his brother, comes to her rescue.
58	26	"Cutthroat Junction"	Dick Moder	Nat Tanchuck	March 18, 1961
Jed Trask (Robert Lansing) joins the outlaws he was supposed to stop when he is abruptly fired during his mission. He is helped by some people of the Virginia City council.
59	27	"The Gift"	William Witney	Denne Bart Petitclerc and Thomas Thompson	April 1, 1961
Joe and a friend (Martin Landau) trek across the desert with a valuable Arab stallion to get a birthday present for Joe's father, unaware that they're being stalked by horse thieves.
60	28	"The Rival"	Robert Altman	Anthony Lawrence	April 15, 1961
Hoss has a crisis of conscience when he sees Jim Applegate (Charles Aidman), a rival for his sweetheart Cameo (Peggy Ann Garner)'s affections, leaving the scene of a lynching.
61	29	"The Infernal Machine"	William Witney	Ward Hawkins	April 22, 1961
A con man persuades the citizens of Virginia City to invest in a horseless carriage. A promoter sells shares into the invention, but all of a sudden he skips town. Eddie Ryder, June Kenney, Nora Hayden and George Kennedy guest star.
62	30	"The Thunderhead Swindle"	Dick Moder	Gene L. Coon	April 29, 1961
There's a sharp rise in unemployment and Ben tries to disprove reports of a silver strike which he believes is fraudulent. Parley Baer, Judson Pratt, Vito Scotti and Ross Elliott guest star.
63	31	"The Secret"	Robert Altman	John Hawkins	May 6, 1961
Joe is falsely accused of murdering a girl following a family friend's testimony. The Cartwrights race to prove his innocence. Crahan Denton guest stars.
64	32	"The Dream Riders"	Robert Altman	James Van Wagoner and Jack McClain	May 20, 1961
A balloonist distracts the citizens of Virginia City while his associates make plans to rob the bank. Sidney Blackmer and Stuart Nisbet guest star.
65	33	"Elizabeth, My Love"	Lewis Allen	Anthony Lawrence	May 27, 1961
Ben remembers his time with Elizabeth Stoddard (Geraldine Brooks), Adam's mother, while his son is seriously ill.
66	34	"Sam Hill"	Robert Altman	David Dortort	June 3, 1961
The Cartwrights help blacksmith Sam Hill (Claude Akins) keep the land where his mother is buried after his drunk father (Edgar Buchanan) signed it away to an old enemy (Ford Rainey). Directed by Robert Altman.

== Release ==
The season aired on Saturdays from 7:30 pm–8:30 pm on NBC. The timeslot was deliberate. It was a time when many people were shopping in department stores, and they could see the show displayed on color televisions at period when color television sets had not yet been widely adopted. However, many people watching at home were still tuning in to Perry Mason in that timeslot.

== Reception ==
Variety gave the first episode of the season a better review than the previous season, writing that the acting and direction "were up to pro standards", and that the show "appears to have a good workable concept riding for it".

Season two finished at number 17 in the Nielsen ratings.
