= Bonanza season 3 =

Bonanza
- Season 3
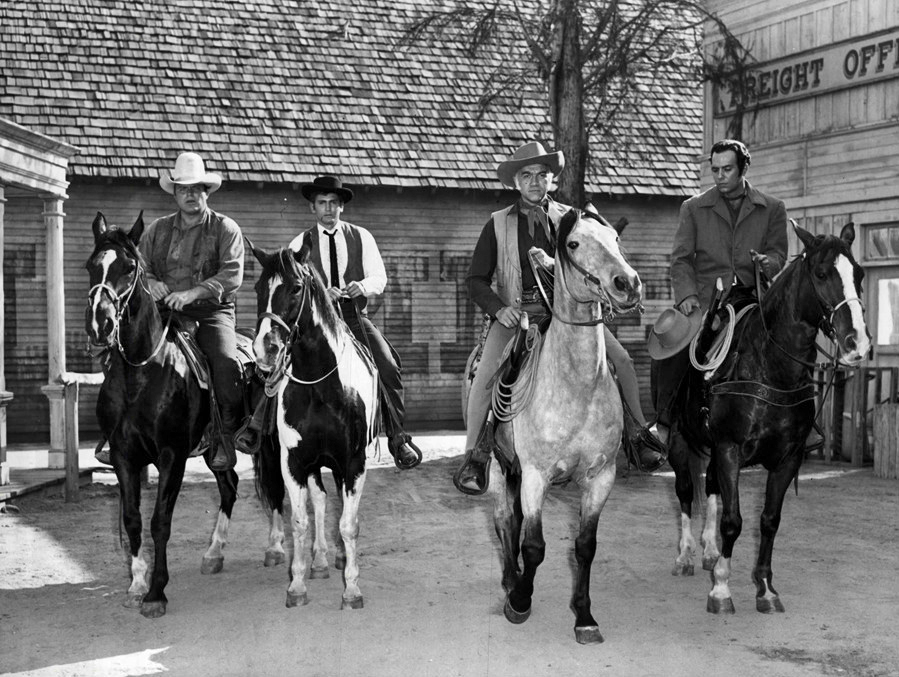
- Cast of Bonanza in 1959
- Starring: Lorne Greene; Pernell Roberts; Dan Blocker; Michael Landon
- No. of episodes: 34

Release
- Original network: NBC
- Original release: September 24, 1961 – May 20, 1962

Season chronology
- ← Previous; Season 2 Next → Season 4

The third season of the American Western television series Bonanza premiered on NBC on September 24, 1961, with the final episode airing May 20, 1962. The series was developed and produced by David Dortort, and season three starred Lorne Greene, Pernell Roberts, Dan Blocker, and Michael Landon. The season consisted of 34 episodes of a series total 431 hour-long episodes, the entirety of which was produced in color. At the start of the third season, the show was moved to Sundays at 9:00 p.m. In that time slot, the ratings soared and the series become second only to Wagon Train as the most popular program on American prime time television.

== Synopsis ==
Bonanza is set around the Ponderosa Ranch near Virginia City, Nevada and chronicles the weekly adventures of the Cartwright family, consisting of Ben Cartwright and his three sons (each by a different wife), Adam, Eric ("Hoss"), and Joseph ("Little Joe"). A regular character is their ranch cook, Hop Sing.

== Cast and characters ==
=== Main cast ===
- Lorne Greene as Ben Cartwright
- Pernell Roberts as Adam Cartwright
- Dan Blocker as Eric "Hoss" Cartwright
- Michael Landon as Joseph "Little Joe" Cartwright

=== Recurring ===
- Victor Sen Yung as Hop Sing
- Ray Teal as Sheriff Roy Coffee

=== Guest stars ===
- John Archer
- Majel Barrett
- Lee Bergere
- Herschel Bernardi
- Lyle Bettger
- Patricia Breslin
- Robert Brown
- Kathie Browne
- John Carradine
- James Coburn
- Ben Cooper
- Robert Culp
- Royal Dano
- Faith Domergue
- James Doohan
- James Dunn
- Jack Easton Jr
- Arthur Franz
- Steven Geray
- Margaret Hayes
- Brooke Hayward
- Ben Johnson
- Dean Jones
- Beatrice Kay
- DeForest Kelley
- Douglas Lambert
- Sue Ane Langdon
- John Litel
- Richard Loo
- Lisa Lu
- Mercedes McCambridge
- John McGiver
- Charles McGraw
- Lee Marvin
- Charles Maxwell
- Jan Merlin
- Vaughn Monroe
- Jeff Morrow
- Vic Morrow
- Diane Mountford
- Ed Nelson
- Frank Overton
- Luciana Paluzzi
- Andre Philippe
- Ford Rainey
- Paul Richards
- Eileen Ryan
- William Schallert
- Nina Shipman
- Karen Steele
- Inga Swenson
- Harry Swoger
- Irene Tedrow
- Ian Wolfe
- Will Wright

== Production ==
=== Writing ===
Season three's writing introduced changes into Lorne Greene's character, Ben Cartwright, after Greene threatened to leave the show. Originally written as a Bible-quoting codger who vowed to shoot anyone who came on his land, Ben Cartwright was a tyrant of a father. Greene wanted a more relatable character with a sense of humor and a healthy relationship with his sons. Dortort revised the character to be a warmer father, and focused more on family and personal justice. The changes contributed to the show's success as the new season moved into the #2 spot in ratings.

This season marked the beginning of script writing for Michael Landon. His initial treatment was a handwritten script of about 30 pages. Frank Chase helped him complete the script, which ultimately became the April 2, 1962 episode, "The Gamble".

=== Filming ===
While filming episode 31, "The Dowry", on location, Pernell Roberts's horse, Sport, slipped and fell while going downhill on a muddy path. After Sport fell, Blocker's horse, Chub, who was following closely, stumbled over him. Roberts and Blocker jumped off their mounts as they had been trained to do, but both actors were injured. Roberts sprained his neck, while Blocker broke his collarbone and shoulder and would miss one episode then wear a sling for the remainder of the season.

Location shoots for the season included Incline Village for episode 9, "The Countess", and Iverson's Movie Ranch for episode 27, "The Gamble".

== Episodes ==
Bonanza, season 3 episodes
No. overall	No. in season	Title	Directed by	Written by	Original release date
67	1	"The Smiler"	Thomas Carr	Lewis Reed	September 24, 1961
The brother (Herschel Bernardi) of the drunk Hoss accidentally killed in self-defense secretly plots his revenge.
68	2	"Springtime"	Christian Nyby	John Furia Jr.	October 1, 1961
Joe accidentally hurts old businessman Jedediah Milbank (John Carradine) while he and his brothers are enjoying the spring.
69	3	"The Honor of Cochise"	Don McDougall	Elliott Arnold	October 8, 1961
Indian war chief Cochise (Jeff Morrow) and his warriors pursue an Army captain (DeForest Kelley) responsible for poisoning Indian women and children. Adam is seriously wounded after he's hit by an Apache bullet.
70	4	"The Lonely House"	William Witney	Frank Chase	October 15, 1961
A lonely widow tends to a wounded bank robber whose gang takes her and Joe hostage. Paul Richards and Faith Domergue guest star.
71	5	"The Burma Rarity"	William Witney	N.B. Stone Jr.	October 21, 1961
Con men try to sell a worthless gem to a former showgirl, but she's too smart for them. People in town would like Ben to get married with widow Hawkins (Beatrice Kay).
72	6	"Broken Ballad"	Robert Butler	John T. Kelly	October 29, 1961
Former gunfighter Ed Payson (Robert Culp) returns to Virginia City and tries to put his past behind him. Adam decides to help him.
73	7	"The Many Faces of Gideon Flinch"	Robert Altman	Robert Vincent Wright	November 5, 1961
Joe is mistaken for con man Gideon Flinch (Ian Wolfe), who along with his niece Jennifer (Sue Ane Langdon), has spent all the money of an investment made by Bullet Head Burke (Harry Swoger).
74	8	"The Friendship"	Don McDougall	Frank Chase	November 12, 1961
Joe tries to help former chain-gang prisoner Danny Kid (Dean Jones), locked up since he was only thirteen, to adjust to his freedom.
75	9	"The Countess"	Robert Sparr	William R. Cox and William D. Powell	November 19, 1961
A countess (Margaret Hayes) returns to Virginia City to resume her romance with Ben, the man she spurned twenty years before in New Orleans.
76	10	"The Horse Breaker"	Don McDougall	Frank Chase	November 26, 1961
Ben tries to help bronco-buster Johnny Lightly (Ben Cooper) who's feeling depressed over losing the use of his legs.
77	11	"Day of the Dragon"	Don McDougall	John T. Dugan	December 3, 1961
Joe wins Su Ling (Lisa Lu), a Chinese slave girl, in a poker game, but she refuses to allow him to free her. Meanwhile, her groom-to-be General Tsung (Richard Loo) is looking for her.
78	12	"The Frenchman"	Christian Nyby	Norman Lessing	December 10, 1961
The Cartwrights deal with a Frenchman who claims to be the reincarnation of medieval and outlaw poet François Villon (Andre Philippe).
79	13	"The Tin Badge"	Lewis Allen	Don Ingalls	December 17, 1961
Two citizens of a nearby small town appoint Joe their sheriff as part of their plot to commit a murder. After he takes the job, Joe becomes suspicious. Vic Morrow, Karen Steele and John Litel guest star.
80	14	"Gabrielle"	Thomas Carr	Anthony Lawrence	December 24, 1961
The Cartwrights help blind girl Gabrielle Wickman (Diane Mountford) find her reclusive grandfather, who spent 21 years in jail for a crime he didn't commit.
81	15	"Land Grab"	David Orrick McDearmon	Ward Hawkins	December 31, 1961
A range war is on the horizon when settlers use deeds to claim ownership of the Ponderosa sold by an unscrupulous friend of Ben's (John McGiver) that the Cartwrights are currently hosting.
82	16	"The Tall Stranger"	Don McDougall	Ward Hawkins	January 7, 1962
Hoss courts Margie Owens (Kathie Browne), a wealthy woman who's equally captivated by a fortune hunter's extravagant promises.
83	17	"The Lady from Baltimore"	John Peyser	Elliott Arnold	January 14, 1962
Status-seeking mother Deborah Banning (Mercedes McCambridge) is disappointed in her husband's financial failures and forces her daughter to marry Joe.
84	18	"The Ride"	Don McDougall	Ward Hawkins	January 21, 1962
Adam sets out to prove one of his business partners Bill Enders (Jan Merlin) is guilty of robbery and murder, but his family and the sheriff are not convinced by his testimony.
85	19	"The Storm"	Lewis Allen	Denne Petitclerc	January 28, 1962
Laura White (Brooke Hayward) displays her affections for Joe when she and her father, sea Captain Matthew White (Frank Overton), visit the Ponderosa.
86	20	"The Auld Sod"	William Witney	Charles Lang	February 4, 1962
Ranch hand Danny Lynch (James Dunn) convinces the Cartwrights to go along with his charade of their ranch being his ranch for his visiting Irish mother, who thinks her son owns the Ponderosa.
87	21	"Gift of Water"	Jesse Hibbs	Borden Chase	February 11, 1962
Tensions rise during a drought and the Cartwrights dig a well in order to bring water to drought-ridden farmers. Royal Dano, Majel Barrett and James Doohan guest star.
88	22	"The Jackknife"	William Witney	Frank Chase	February 18, 1962
Adam tries to save the marriage of a couple whose son he befriends. Adam doesn't know that the father, rancher Matt Grant (John Archer), is the member of a gang of rustlers.
89	23	"The Guilty"	Lewis Allen	Clifford Irving	February 25, 1962
Retired sheriff Lem Partridge (Lyle Bettger) blames his friend Ben for his son Jimmy's (Jack Easton Jr) death when the boy is shot and killed by vengeful gunman Jack Groat (Charles Maxwell).
90	24	"The Wooing of Abigail Jones"	Christian Nyby	Norman Lessing	March 4, 1962
The Cartwrights boys help shy ranch hand Hank Meyers (Vaughn Monroe) court schoolteacher Abigail Jones (Eileen Ryan).
91	25	"The Lawmaker"	Christian Nyby	Story by : John A. Johns; Teleplay by : Dick Nelson	March 11, 1962
The acting sheriff, rancher Asa Moran (Arthur Franz), of Virginia City abuses his authority while Roy Coffee is out due to injury.
92	26	"Look to the Stars"	Don McDougall	Robert M. Fresco and Paul Rink	March 18, 1962
Ben discovers that young genius Albert Michelson (Douglas Lambert) was expelled from school because of a bigoted schoolmaster (William Schallert).
93	27	"The Gamble"	William Witney	Story by : Michael Landon; Teleplay by : Frank Cleaver and Michael Landon	April 1, 1962
Joe hurries to rescue his father and brothers from being executed on a false murder charge. Charles McGraw and Ben Johnson guest star.
94	28	"The Crucible"	Paul Nickell	John T. Dugan	April 8, 1962
Adam ends up stranded in the desert where he is forced to depend on insane miner Peter Kane (Lee Marvin), who forces the Cartwright into slavery to drive Adam to murder.
95	29	"Inger, My Love"	Lewis Allen	Story by : Anthony Lawrence; Teleplay by : Frank Cleaver and David Dortort	April 15, 1962
Ben remembers his courtship with his second wife and Hoss's mother, Inger (Inga Swenson).
96	30	"Blessed Are They"	Don McDougall	Story by : Borden Chase; Teleplay by : Borden Chase and Frank Cleaver	April 22, 1962
Ben must settle a bitter feud between the Mahan and Clarke families that threatens to divide the citizens of Virginia City. Robert Brown, Ford Rainey and Irene Tedrow.
97	31	"The Dowry"	Christian Nyby	Robert Vincent Wright	April 29, 1962
The Cartwrights take in wounded man Alexander Dubois (Steven Geray), his daughter Michele (Luciana Paluzzi) and her fiancé Don Ricardo Fernandez (Lee Bergere). Michele might have been robbed of her dowry.
98	32	"The Long Night"	William Witney	George Stackalee and E. M. Parsons	May 6, 1962
Adam is mistaken for an escaped convict and finds himself caught between the real convict (James Coburn) and a lynch mob. Adam needs to prove his real identity.
99	33	"The Mountain Girl"	Don McDougall	John Furia	May 13, 1962
Joe is given the task of changing a mountain girl (Nina Shipman) into a refined young lady, as wished by the girl's late grandfather Seth Coombs (Will Wright).
100	34	"The Miracle Maker"	Don McDougall	Story by : Lewis Reed; Teleplay by : Frank Cleaver and Preston Wood	May 20, 1962
A so-called faith healer (Ed Nelson) offers to help Susan (Patricia Breslin) with her guilt over her father dying in a wagon crash.

== Release ==
The season aired on Sundays from 9:00 pm–10:00 pm on NBC. This was a move from the season one and two timeslot of Saturdays from 7:30 pm–8:30 pm on NBC.

== Reception ==
In its new season three time slot, the ratings soared and the series become second only to Wagon Train as the most popular program on American prime time television.

As the show became more popular, celebrities requested to do the show. A November 11, 1961 episode of Maverick, "Three Queens Full", parodied the show using Jim Backus as Joe Wheelwright, who, along with his sons Henry, Moose, and Small Paul, all lived on their ranch known as the Subrosa.

=== Awards and nominations ===
Award	Year (Note: Indicates the year of ceremony.)	Category	Nominee(s) / Work	Result	Ref(s)
Primetime Creative Arts Emmy Awards	1962	Outstanding Achievement in Cinematography for Television	Haskell Boggs and Walter Castle	Nominated	
