= Eileen Chesis =

American actress (born 1953)

- Born: September 11, 1953 (age 71); Jersey City, New Jersey, U.S.
- Occupation: Actor
- Years active: 1954–present

Eileen Chesis (born September 11, 1953) is an American actress who appeared as a child in several American network television series of the 1960s.

== Early years ==
Chesis was born in Jersey City, New Jersey, on September 11, 1953. She is the daughter of Murray and Anita Chesis. The family lived in North Bergen, New Jersey, until August 1959, when they moved to Los Angeles. Her father was a sales executive for a company that made office machines. She studied singing, dancing, and dramatics in addition to her regular schoolwork.

Chesis's introduction to performing began when her mother submitted her picture in a beauty contest. The photograph caught the attention of a model agent, and by March 1960 she had made 30 filmed commercials in addition to working in commercials on live television.

== Television career ==
Chesis portrayed Cissy Porter, one of the daughters in the sitcom The Tom Ewell Show in 1960-1961. Her other television work as a child consisted of appearances in Lassie, in the crime-drama The Detectives, in the medical-drama The Eleventh Hour, and in the western Destry — she also appeared (as two different characters) in two different episodes of Bonanza (1962-1963).

Her only television work as an adult was in 1975, where she played Nancy in the live-action super-hero series The Secrets of Isis.

== Film ==
On September 11, 1959, Chesis's parents signed a five-year contract with a producer, with her first film to be Tall Story.
