= Eve Miller =

American actress (1923–1973)

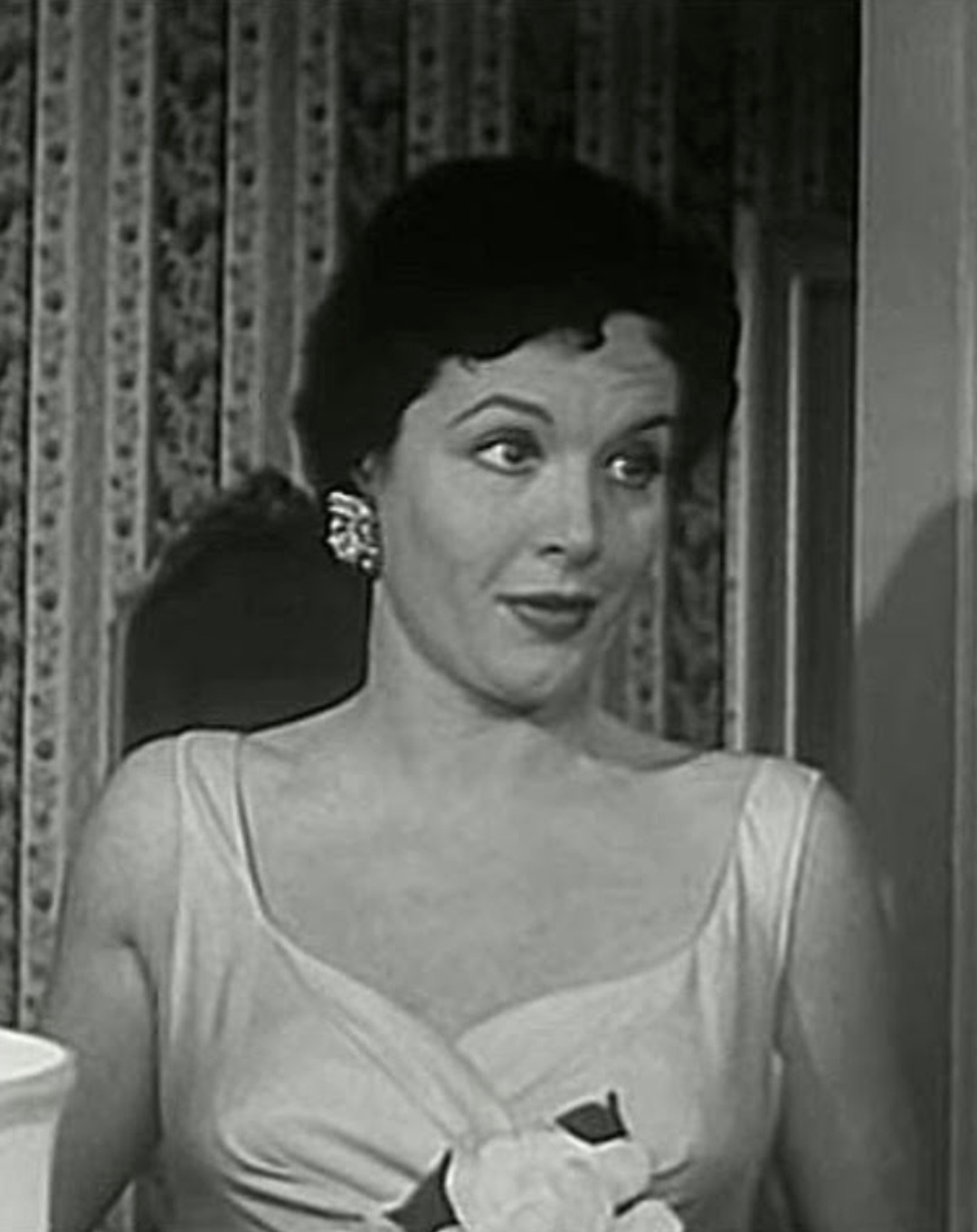
- Miller in The Big Bluff (1955)
- Born: Marilyn Miller; August 8, 1923; Los Angeles, California, U.S.
- Died: August 17, 1973 (aged 50); Van Nuys, California, U.S.
- Resting place: Forest Lawn Memorial Park, Hollywood Hills
- Occupation: Actress
- Years active: 1945–1961

Eve Marilyn Miller (born Marilyn Miller; August 8, 1923 – August 17, 1973) was an American actress who appeared in 41 films between 1945 and 1961. She was born in Los Angeles, California, and died in Van Nuys, California. She died by suicide at age 50.

== Early life ==
Born in Los Angeles, California, Miller was the daughter of Mr. and Mrs. Robert Stanley Miller and was raised in San Francisco, where her father was a piano salesman.

During the early years of World War II, Miller worked as a welder in a shipyard and later, before the war ended, became a department store clerk.

== Movie career ==
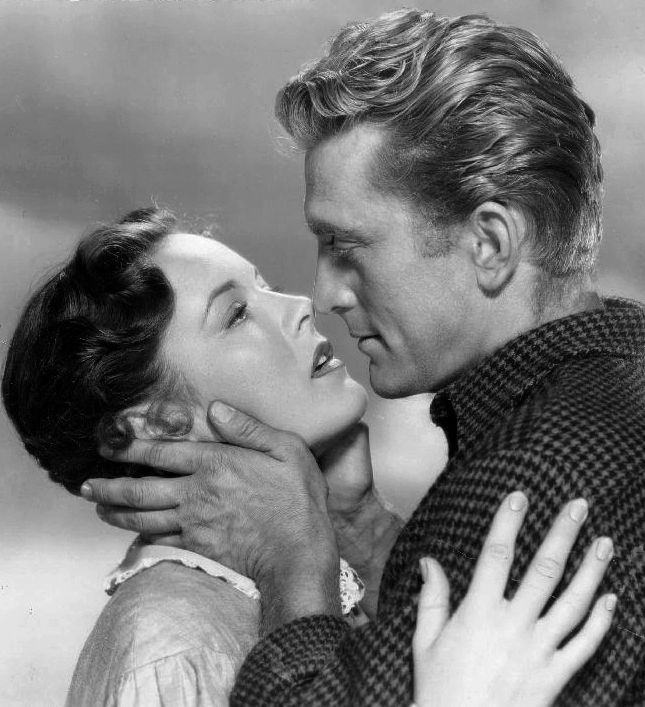
Eve Miller with Kirk Douglas in The Big Trees (1952)

In 1951, after several small parts in television and movies such as The Vicious Years (1950), Miller came to the attention of producer-director Ida Lupino and through her influence was cast in Warner Brothers' The Big Trees, starring opposite Kirk Douglas. Several more parts followed such as The Winning Team with Ronald Reagan and Kansas Pacific starring Sterling Hayden. Miller's main work though came in a long string of television roles stretching through the 1950s.

She appeared regularly in anthologies such as Fireside Theater, Four Star Playhouse, and Crossroads. The actress also had parts in a number of series including Lassie, Annie Oakley, and Richard Diamond, Private Detective.

== Personal life ==
In 1954, Miller met Glase Lohman, an actor who had a brief television and movie career in the mid-1950s, and they became engaged. On July 21, 1955, after an argument between the two, Miller attempted suicide by stabbing herself in the abdomen. According to newspapers at the time, she was discovered by police on her kitchen floor, surrounded by letters she had written to Lohman. Eventually, after four hours of surgery, she recovered.

On August 17, 1973, Miller died by suicide in Van Nuys, California. Her death was not widely reported at the time. She was interred in Forest Lawn Cemetery (Hollywood Hills).

== Filmography ==
=== Film ===
- Diamond Horseshoe (1945) - Chorine (uncredited)
- I Wonder Who's Kissing Her Now (1947) - Anita (uncredited)
- Buckaroo from Powder River (1947) - Molly Parnell
- Inner Sanctum (1948) - Marie Kembar
- Beyond the Forest (1949) - Switchboard Operator (uncredited)
- Arctic Fury (1949) - Martha Barlow
- Never Fear (1950) - Phyllis Townsend
- Mrs. O'Malley and Mr. Malone (1950) - Nurse on Train (uncredited)
- The Vicious Years (1950) - Giulia
- Pier 23 (1951) - Norma Harmon
- The Big Trees (1952) - Alicia Chadwick
- The Winning Team (1952) - Margaret Killefer
- She's Working Her Way Through College (1952) - Copeland's Secretary (uncredited)
- The Story of Will Rogers (1952) - Cora Marshall
- April in Paris (1952) - Marcia Sherman
- Kansas Pacific (1953) - Barbara Bruce
- The Desperate Women (1954) - Woman
- There's No Business Like Show Business (1954) - Hatcheck Girl
- The Big Bluff (1955) - Marsha Jordan
- Artists and Models (1955) - (uncredited)
- Broadway Jungle (1955)

=== Television ===
- Your Show Time (1949)
- The Range Rider (1951) - Ruth Wilson / Amy
- Fireside Theatre (1953) - Laura Chadson / Millie / Poetess / Mary
- Mayor of the Town (1954) - Marion Lane
- Annie Oakley (1954-1957) - Kathy Stokes / Laura Stevens / Jane Lester
- The Lineup (1954-1959) - Jane Carstairs / Mrs. Patterson
- The Whistler (1955) - Edith
- City Detective (1955) - Katherine
- Crossroads (1955-1957) - Helen Chamberlain / Mrs. Withersp
- Navy Log (1957) - Lois MacKenzie
- Mr. Adams and Eve (1957) - Begum (Episode: "International Affair")
- Perry Mason (1958) - Nora Kelly
- Frontier Doctor (1959) - Paula Mason
