= The Tom Ewell Show =

- Genre: Situation comedy
- Created by: Madelyn Martin and Bob Carroll, Jr.
- Starring: Tom Ewell
- Composers: Jerry Fielding; Rudy Schrager
- No. of seasons: 1
- No. of episodes: 32

Production
- Camera setup: Multi-camera
- Running time: 24 minutes
- Production companies: Ewell-Carroll-Martin; Four Star Productions

Original release
- Network: CBS
- Release: September 27, 1960 – May 23, 1961

Left to right: Marilyn Erskine, Tom Ewell, and Mabel Albertson in a promotional photograph for The Tom Ewell Show.

The Tom Ewell Show, also known as The Trouble With Tom, is an American sitcom that aired on CBS during the 1960-61 television season. It depicts the challenges a husband and father faces as he resides in a household otherwise consisting entirely of women and girls.

== Synopsis ==
Tom Potter is a bumbling real estate agent who resides at 611 Elm Street in Las Palmas, California. As the only male member of his household, his entire life away from the office is dominated by females. Residing with him are his wife Fran; three daughters (15-year-old Carol, 11-year-old Debbie, and 7-year-old Sissie); Fran's mother, Grandma Irene Brady, a skeptic whom Tom calls Mother Brady; the family dog, Mitzi; and a parakeet. Other people in Tom's life include his co-worker Howie Fletcher, his heavy-set friend Jim Rafferty, and Stanley, a neighborhood boy. Tom faces constant challenges as he tries to navigate life in a woman's world. A big sports fan, he longs for male companionship, but his attempts at male bonding often lead to problems at home with his wife, daughters, and mother-in-law.

== Cast ==
- Tom Potter...Tom Ewell
- Fran Potter...Marilyn Erskine
- Grandma Irene Brady...Mabel Albertson
- Carol Potter...Cynthia Chenault (credited as Cindy Robbins)
- Debbie Potter...Sherry Alberoni
- Sissie Potter...Eileen Chesis
- Howie Fletcher...Norman Fell (recurring)
- Jim Rafferty...Barry Kelley (recurring)
- Stanley...Vance Meadows (recurring)
- Mitzi, the family dog...Mitzi (recurring)

== Production notes ==
Comic actor Tom Ewell, who had starred in the romantic comedy film The Seven Year Itch with Marilyn Monroe in 1955 and the musical comedy The Girl Can't Help It with Jayne Mansfield and Edmond O'Brien in 1956, made his television debut in The Tom Ewell Show. Madelyn Martin and Bob Carroll, Jr. (of The Lucy Show fame) created the show, and Ewell's own production company produced it in partnership with Martin and Carroll and with Four Star Productions. It was sponsored alternately by The Quaker Oats Company and Procter & Gamble.

Sherry Alberoni, who played Debbie Potter, was a former Mouseketeer.

== Critical reception ==
In a review published in its October 10, 1960, edition, TIME magazine said:

"The Tom Ewell Show (CBS) leads a relentless parade of situation comedies, all designed to show that American family life is as cute as a freckle on a five-year-old. The show, which might also be titled Father Knows Nothing, presents the comic with the excavated face as a bumbler named Potter who is trapped in the customary format: Harassed Man Beaten Down by Wife, Three Daughters, Mother-in-Law. In the opening episode, Ewell could find no better way to outsmart his spendthrift women than closing his bank account and ruining his own credit. For those who may have tuned out early, the women were all set to start spending again."

After its debut in September 1960, The Tom Ewell Show struggled in the ratings. In an interview with Associated Press television critic Cynthia Lowry published on December 4, 1960, Ewell explained that he had examined early reviews of the show after its debut episode and found some positive ones, but also discovered that the negative reviews reflected two main concerns he also had about the show's writing and performances, i.e., that it depicted the Tom Potter character as "too much of a boob," with too great a focus on his ineptness rather than on "real comedy," and that it attempted "to play farce in a realistic situation" even though farce is not realistic, leading to an inappropriate tempo and defeating the effort at farce. Ewell promised that changes in the show's writing and acting to address these problems would be apparent beginning with the episode ("Site Unseen") broadcast on December 6, 1960. The Potter family pets, Mitzi the dog and a parakeet, also were dropped from the series, Ewell explaining that acting with the animals had proven not to be worth the effort.

The new approach Ewell described in December 1960 did not save The Tom Ewell Show. A television article carried in the April 4, 1961, edition of The Herald and Review of Decatur, Illinois, stated that "The Tom Ewell Show probably will be dropped in July [1961]." An article carried in the May 2, 1961, edition of the same newspaper indicated that the series had indeed been dropped.

== Broadcast schedule ==
The Tom Ewell Show lasted a single season. Its 32 episodes were broadcast in the United States on CBS at 9:00 pm Eastern Time on Tuesday nights from September 27, 1960, through May 23, 1961. Eight of the episodes were shown as summer repeats in the same timeslot from May 30, 1961, through July 18, 1961.

== Episodes ==
| No. | Title | Directed by | Written by | Original release date |
|---|---|---|---|---|
| 1 | "Tom Cuts Off the Credit" | Unknown | Unknown | September 27, 1960 |
Tom cuts his wife and daughters off from credit cards and the family checking account in order to teach them a lesson about finances. Guest stars: Jan Arvan, Raymond Bailey, Madge Blake, Jimmy Cross, Joe Forte, Ray Kellogg, and Monty Margetts.
| 2 | "Debbie Takes Up the Tuba" | Hy Averback | Madelyn Pugh & Bob Carroll, Jr. | October 4, 1960 |
After Tom insists that Debbie do something to bring culture into her life, she starts taking tuba lessons so that she can join the school orchestra — and her constant practicing annoys the entire family.
| 3 | "The Safety Lesson" | Hy Averback | Fred S. Fox & Irving Elinson | October 11, 1960 |
Tom, upset at always being the family chauffeur, tries to teach Fran how to drive a car. Junius Matthews (best known as the voice of Rabbit in Disney's Winnie the Pooh movies) guest-stars as an elderly man. Ray Montgomery and James H. Drake also guest-star.
| 4 | "Tom Takes Over" | Jerry Thorpe | Madelyn Pugh & Bob Carroll, Jr. | October 18, 1960 |
The pilot episode for the series. Fran gets appendicitis, and Tom has to take over the housework.
| 5 | "Tom Puts the Girls to Work" | Hy Averback | Madelyn Pugh & Bob Carroll, Jr. | November 1, 1960 |
Tom finds part-time jobs for his daughters, who rebel against the idea. Billy Mumy guest-stars as a young boy. Cheerio Meredith also guest-stars.
| 6 | "The Second Phone" | Hy Averback | Story by : Irving Elinson & Fred S. Fox and Michael Morris; Teleplay by : Michael Morris | November 15, 1960 |
After Tom becomes frustrated with the rest of the family monopolizing the phone, his family pressures him to get a second phone for the house. Guest stars: Howard Smith, Bruce MacFarlane, Tony Michaels, and Sam Hearn.
| 7 | "The Handwriting on the Wall" | Hy Averback | Michael Morris & Max Wilk | November 22, 1960 |
Tom and Fran's daughters behave badly and try to hide the results — and when Tom takes up handwriting analysis, he gets a new slant on his business deals. Guest stars: David Lewis, Andrea King, Fay McKenzie, Adrianne Ellis, Jack McCall, and Patti Chapman.
| 8 | "The Spelling Bee" | Hy Averback | Larry Rhine & Milton Pascal | November 29, 1960 |
When Debbie competes in a spelling bee, Tom dreams about how it would be to have three sons instead of three daughters. Howard Petrie, Darryl Richard, Don Edmonds, Thomas B. Henry, Vernon W. Rich, Bert Holland, and William K. Hummer.
| 9 | "Site Unseen" | Hy Averback | Max Wilk & Michael Morris | December 6, 1960 |
Tom devises a scheme to show that he has the political aptitude to be elected to the city council by bringing the actor Dick Powell into town and making an important real estate deal — and it leads to a donnybrook all over City Park. Dick Powell guest-stars as himself in this episode, in which the actual Four Star Productions lot is used as part of the story. Other guest stars: Parley Baer, William Woodson, Russ Conway, Tyler McVey, Marjorie Bennett, Dick Bernie, Dick Ryan, David Alpert, David Halper, and Robin Warga.
| 10 | "The Friendly Man" | Hy Averback | Michael Morris & Max Wilk | December 20, 1960 |
Tom decides to branch out from real estate into the insurance business. Shortly after getting his insurance license, he sells a homeowners liability policy to the Steckels, a kindly elderly couple, and thinks he's made a great deal — but the Steckels are crafty as well as kindly, and they give him a run for his money when their house begins to fall apart almost as soon as the policy he sold them goes into effect. Ernest Truex and Mildred Dunnock guest-star as Mr. and Mrs. Steckel.
| 11 | "Salesmanship Lesson" | Unknown | Unknown | December 27, 1960 |
Tom and the girls learn a lesson in sales when he sets out to teach a young man "realestatesmanship."
| 12 | "Advice to the Lovelorn" | Unknown | Unknown | January 3, 1961 |
Tom frantically tries to dissuade Carol and her boyfriend from making marital plans. Whit Bissell and Ray Stricklyn guest-star.
| 13 | "Try It on For Size" | Unknown | Unknown | January 10, 1961 |
Incensed by his family telling him what to wear and feeling that it undermines his status as head of the household, Tom goes shopping for clothes by himself to show that he does not need their advice, buys a suit he hates, and insists on wearing it anyway out of pride — and ends up having to explain how he ended up buying something he did not want in the first place.
| 14 | "No Fun in the Sun" | Hy Averback | Larry Rhine & Milton Pascal | January 17, 1961 |
Tom and Fran plan a brief, peaceful vacation by a lake without the children — but their getaway turns out to be anything but carefree when they try to call home and no one answers the phone. Robert Hastings guest-stars.
| 15 | "Mr. Shrewd" | Hy Averback | Michael Morris & Max Wilk | January 24, 1961 |
Concerned that money is being handled too freely around the Potter household, Tom tries to be a shrewd businessman — and ends up alienating almost every tradesman in town. John Dehner and Herbie Faye guest-star.
| 16 | "The Middle Child" | Unknown | Unknown | January 31, 1961 |
Debbie is upset that she is not treated the same as her younger sister or her older sister.
| 17 | "The Trouble With Mother" | Hy Averback | Howard Leeds | February 7, 1961 |
Grandma isn't satisfied with her life and believes she has become a nuisance around the house — and the Potter family takes drastic action when she decides to accept a dreary proposal of marriage from a man who is a bore.
| 18 | "A Fellow Needs a Friend" | Unknown | Unknown | February 14, 1961 |
Tom invites Carol's teenage boyfriend to go to a Los Angeles Rams football game with him, much to Carol's displeasure. Alan Reed Jr. (son of actor Alan Reed) guest-stars as Carol′s boyfriend.
| 19 | "Out of Left Field" | Unknown | Unknown | February 21, 1961 |
Tom befriends a baseball player — and unintentionally undermines the pitching staff of the Los Angeles Dodgers.
| 20 | "Storm Over Shangri-La" | James Sheldon | Milton Pascal & Larry Rhine | February 28, 1961 |
Tom's pending real-estate deal may leave three elderly ladies (played by Katherine Squire, June Walker, and Isabel Randolph) homeless.
| 21 | "I Don't See It" | Hy Averback | Michael Morris & Max Wilk | March 7, 1961 |
While trying to sell the home of a debt-ridden spinster, Tom discovers that he has great artistic talent. Alice Ghostley plays eccentric painter Lavinia Barrington, and Robert Emhardt plays villainous Orville Bostwick.
| 22 | "The Old Magic" | Hy Averback | Max Wilk & Michael Morris | March 14, 1961 |
John Emery plays Tom's footloose, gregarious, and carefree old college buddy, Jack Hunter, who invites Tom and Fran to a wild Hollywood party — and then makes a play for Fran. Former "Miss Iceland" Sirry Steffen and character actor Fay Roope also appear as party guests.
| 23 | "Mrs. Dynamite" | Hy Averback | Michael Morris & Max Wilk | March 21, 1961 |
After Tom hires a girl Friday to clean up the office, she does — and Tom discovers that too much efficiency is a dangerous thing.
| 24 | "The Prying Eye" | Unknown | Unknown | March 28, 1961 |
After Tom vows that he would never get caught on a hidden-camera television program and writes to a hidden-camera show to tell them they would never be able to trick him, the show′s producers decide to find him and create a situation in which they can trick him. After Tom is subjected to various situations, he realizes that the show could be filming him surreptitoiusly and walks away. The episode switches between camera shots and movements typical of a situation comedy to those used in a hidden-camera show, with the camera filming the event from a distance using a zoom lens and panning to follow Tom as he participates in the scene. George Fenneman appears as Randy Rambo, Jean Carson as a girl named Diane, and Grace (Gillen) Albertson as Sally Gallagher. It is not clear whether Sally's husband Al Gallagher was portrayed by Frank Albertson (Grace's husband) or Jack Albertson (brother of series star Mabel Albertson).
| 25 | "The Chutney Caper" | Hy Averback | Max Wilk & Michael Morris | April 4, 1961 |
Tom's eccentric, madcap sister Polly, who has odd hobbies, enjoys poached curry for breakfast, and believes that she is involved with the cosmos and that everything that happens to her must, therefore, happen to Tom, comes for a visit and imposes her own odd notion of togetherness on the household, inflicting domestic disaster on the Potter family. Alice Ghostley returns in a different role, as Polly,
| 26 | "Put It On, Take It Off" | Hy Averback | Michael Morris & Max Wilk | April 11, 1961 |
Tom decides to buy Fran a dress for a dance, shopping first in a bargain-basement store and then in a fancy salon. He decides that to be a big spender he needs to have the earnings to match, so he set the real estate world on fire — and when a gullible insurance client finances his splurges, he buys the best, and ends up with an ironic reward for his efforts. Eleanor Audley plays Madame Defarge.
| 27 | "Big Brother" | Hy Averback | Milton Pascal & Larry Rhine | April 18, 1961 |
Tom takes in an orphan for Big Brother Week. Child-actor Pat Close guest-stars as the orphan.
| 28 | "Handy Man" | Hy Averback | Max Wilk & Michael Morris | April 25, 1961 |
Balking at the cost estimate of a professional handyman, Tom lays a new kitchen floor himself — but when the Potters′ water heater breaks, the handyman refuses to help.
| 29 | "Passenger Pending" | Richard Kinon | Larry Rhine & Milton Pascal | May 2, 1961 |
Tom falls asleep at the airport and misses his flight to Montreal, imperiling a big business deal.
| 30 | "Never Do Business with Relatives" | Bill Harmon | Michael Morris & Max Wilk | May 9, 1961 |
Grandma buys Tom's convertible against Fran's advice, and the car stops running almost as soon as the deal is completed.
| 31 | "Our Vacation" | Unknown | Unknown | May 16, 1961 |
Tom defies reason when he tries to arrange a family vacation and his family can't agree on a vacation site.
| 32 | "Mr. Memory" | Unknown | Unknown | May 23, 1961 |
Tom has trouble remembering anything and needs to pass his real estate exam, so he hires a memory expert to help him study for the test. Guest stars: Don Beddoe and Ralph Bell.
