= Kansas Pacific (film) =

1953 film by Ray Nazarro

- Film poster
- Directed by: Ray Nazarro
- Written by: Daniel B. Ullman
- Produced by: Walter Wanger; Edward Morey Jr.
- Starring: Sterling Hayden; Eve Miller
- Cinematography: Harry Neumann
- Edited by: William Austin; Walter Hannemann
- Music by: Albert Sendrey
- Production company: Walter Wanger Productions
- Distributed by: Allied Artists Pictures Corporation
- Release date: February 22, 1953
- Running time: 73 minutes
- Country: United States
- Language: English

Kansas Pacific is a 1953 American Cinecolor Western film released by Allied Artists Pictures and directed by Ray Nazarro. It stars Sterling Hayden and Eve Miller. While the film was released in 1953, the title screen clearly states "Copyright MCMLII" (1952). The film offers a fictionalized account of the struggle to build the Kansas Pacific Railway in the early 1860s just prior to the American Civil War. In the film the building of the railroad in Kansas is opposed by sympathizers of the South before it forms the Confederacy.

General-in-Chief of the United States Army Winfield Scott sends a Corps of Engineers captain (Hayden) incognito to complete the railroad in order to supply western Union outposts when the anticipated war starts. Opposing the railway is Confederate William Quantrill (Reed Hadley), whose mission is to stop or delay the railway from being completed.

Miller plays the only female character within the entire movie. This film also features Clayton Moore. Andrew V. McLaglen is credited as assistant director in the opening credits of this movie.

The rights to the film are currently in the public domain.

== Plot ==
Prior to the Civil War but after the South has seceded from the U.S., the film centres on the efforts to build a railroad across Kansas toward the West Coast. Southern sympathizers attempt to sabotage the railroad construction efforts so U.S. Army Corps of Engineers Captain John Nelson is brought in to keep the project going. Captain Nelson must not only contend with the efforts of the saboteurs headed up by William Quantrill but also try to romance the railroad foreman's daughter, Barbara Bruce.

== Cast ==
- Sterling Hayden as Captain John Nelson
- Eve Miller as Barbara Bruce
- Barton MacLane as Cal Bruce
- Reed Hadley as William Quantrill
- Irving Bacon as Casey
- James Griffith as Joe Farley
- Douglas Fowley as Max Janus
- Harry Shannon as Smokestack
- Myron Healey as Morey
- Clayton Moore as Henchman Stone
- Robert Keys as Lieutenant Stanton
- Tom Fadden as Gus Gustavson
- Jonathan Hale as Sherman Johnson
- Lane Bradford as Max (uncredited)
- Fred Graham as Corvin (uncredited)

== Production ==
The movie was filmed at the Iverson Movie Ranch and the Sierra Railroad in what is now Railtown 1897 State Historic Park, Jamestown, California. Walter Mirisch of Allied Artists had Walter Wanger's name put on the picture as a producer, although he was in prison for shooting agent Jennings Lang, whom he believed to be having an affair with his wife, Joan Bennett. Thanks to Mirisch, Wanger received a producer's billing, salary and profit participation.
