= Arctic Fury =

1949 film

- Theatrical release poster
- Directed by: Norman Dawn; Fred R. Feitshans Jr.
- Screenplay by: Charles F. Royal; Norton S. Parker; Robert Libott; Frank Burt
- Story by: Norman Dawn
- Produced by: Norman Dawn; Fred R. Feitshans Jr. Boris Petroff
- Starring: Alfred Delcambre; Eve Miller; Gloria Petroff; Dan Riss; Merrill McCormick; Fred Smith
- Narrated by: Dan Riss
- Cinematography: Norman Dawn; Edward A. Kull; Jacob Kull; William C. Thompson
- Edited by: Fred R. Feitshans Jr.
- Music by: Arthur Kay
- Production company: Plymouth Productions
- Distributed by: RKO Pictures
- Release date: May 4, 1949
- Running time: 61 minutes
- Country: United States
- Language: English

Arctic Fury is a 1949 American adventure film directed by Norman Dawn and Fred R. Feitshans Jr. and written by Charles F. Royal, Norton S. Parker, Robert Libott and Frank Burt. The film stars Alfred Delcambre, Eve Miller, Gloria Petroff, Dan Riss, Merrill McCormick and Fred Smith. The film was released on May 4, 1949, by RKO Radio Pictures.

Arctic Fury is an updated version of the film Tundra (1936), which starred Alfred Del Cambre (billed as "Del Cambre"). Tundra, like other films produced by the Edgar Rice Burroughs-Tarzan company, was filmed on location under primitive and sometimes treacherous conditions. Norman Dawn staged the action, serving as director and co-photographer. In 1949 director-film editor Fred Feitshans, Jr. prepared a remake to be produced in Hollywood, using many of the arctic action sequences from the original Tundra. Co-stars Alfred Delcambre and Merrill McCormick were hired to repeat their former roles in new scenes.

== Plot ==
As the film opens, government official Dan Riss informs the viewing audience that the film which follows tells an incredible-but-true story.

A doctor (Alfred Delcambre), who served as a U.S. Navy medical officer during World War II, settles down in Alaska with his wife and daughter (Eve Miller and Gloria Petroff, respectively) to open a private practice. But, the population still being sparse, even in 1949, he occasionally bush pilots his open-cockpit monoplane to out-of-the-way places in the wilderness to render medical aid. When he hears of an Inuit tribe afflicted with a contagious disease, unknown to them, he makes an extended flight to examine them. But, his plane develops engine trouble and he crash-lands in the Colville River region of northern Alaska, where he just barely swims to shore ahead of a hungry polar bear and an avalanche of falling glacial ice.

Having memorized a map to the Inuit village, shown him by Mack (Merrill McCormick), a Sourdough fur trapper, he begins traipsing overland. Along the way, he briefly takes shelter in a cave already inhabited by a mother black bear with two cubs. In chasing her off, however, he finds that her cubs are still in the cave. So, when he resumes his journey, he takes them with him. Eventually noting, in his pilot's log, that he has named them Tom and Jerry!

Wreckage from the doctor's plane is eventually found, renewing hope of the doctor's survival within both his wife and Mack. Guessing that the doctor is headed on foot towards the Inuit village, the trapper heads there in his boat. Arriving there just in time to rescue both the doctor and the bear cubs from feral sled dogs gone half-mad with hunger (their Inuit owners having died from the aforementioned illness).

The doctor eventually replaces his previous aircraft with a new one of the same type. And the narrator concludes the story by claiming how the doctor's tale of survival has been handed down among the Inuit as a campfire story worthy of retelling. With various members of other tribes looking up at his supposedly passing-by plane with grateful awe and respect.

== Cast ==
- Alfred Delcambre as Dr. Thomas Barlow
- Eve Miller as Martha Barlow
- Gloria Petroff as Emily Barlow
- Dan Riss as Director of the Thompson Institute
- Merrill McCormick as Mack
- Fred Smith as Jim
