= Bonanza =

American Western television series (1959–1973)

- Also known as: Ponderosa
- Genre: Western
- Created by: David Dortort
- Starring: Lorne Greene; Pernell Roberts; Dan Blocker; Michael Landon; Guy Williams; Victor Sen Yung; David Canary; Mitch Vogel; Ray Teal; Bing Russell; Tim Matheson; Lou Frizzell
- Theme music composer: Ray Evans; Jay Livingston
- Opening theme: "Bonanza"
- Ending theme: "Bonanza"
- Composers: David Rose; Walter Scharf; Harry Sukman; Fred Steiner; William Lava
- Country of origin: United States
- Original language: English
- No. of seasons: 14
- No. of episodes: 431 (list of episodes)

Production
- Executive producers: David Dortort; Mark Roberts
- Producers: Fred Hamilton; Robert Blees; Richard Collins
- Running time: 49–50 minutes (excluding commercials)
- Production company: NBC Productions

Original release
- Network: NBC
- Release: September 12, 1959 – January 16, 1973

Bonanza is an American Western television series that ran on NBC from September 12, 1959, to January 16, 1973. Lasting 14 seasons and 431 episodes, Bonanza is NBC's longest-running Western, the second-longest-running Western series on American network television (behind CBS's Gunsmoke), and one of the longest-running, live-action American series. The show continues to air in syndication. The show is set in the 1860s and centers on the wealthy Cartwright family, who live in the vicinity of Virginia City, Nevada, bordering Lake Tahoe. The series initially starred Lorne Greene, Pernell Roberts, Dan Blocker and Michael Landon and later featured (at various times) Guy Williams, David Canary, Mitch Vogel and Tim Matheson. The show is known for presenting pressing moral dilemmas.

The title "Bonanza" is a term used by miners in regard to a large vein or deposit of silver ore, from Spanish bonanza (rich ore body) and commonly refers to the 1859 revelation of the Comstock Lode of rich silver ore mines under the town of Virginia City, not far from the fictional Ponderosa Ranch that the Cartwright family operated. The show's theme song, also titled "Bonanza", became a hit song. Only instrumental renditions, without Ray Evans's lyrics, were used during the series's long run.

In 2002, Bonanza was ranked No. 43 on TV Guide's 50 Greatest TV Shows of All Time, and in 2013 TV Guide included it in its list of The 60 Greatest Dramas of All Time. The time period for the television series is roughly between 1861 (Season 1) and 1867 (Season 13) during and shortly after the American Civil War, coinciding with the period Nevada Territory became a U.S. state.

During the summer of 1972, NBC aired reruns of episodes from the 1967–1970 period in prime time on Tuesday evenings under the title Ponderosa.

== Premise ==
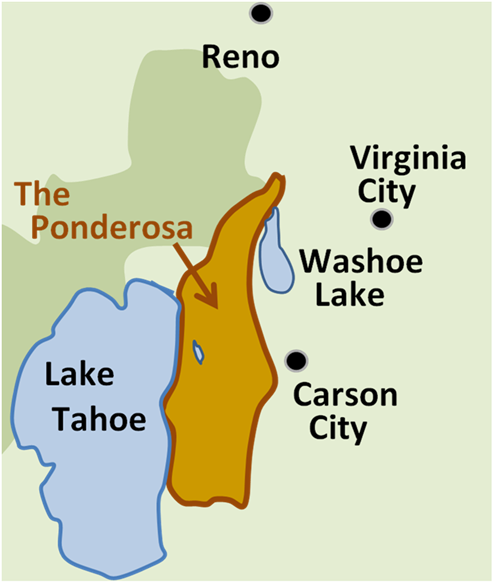
Approximate location of the fictional Ponderosa Ranch, the home of Cartwright family. The map is oriented with North at the top (instead of East at the top, as in the map shown on the program).

The show chronicles the weekly adventures of the Cartwright family, headed by the thrice-widowed patriarch Ben Cartwright (Lorne Greene). He had three sons, each by a different wife: the eldest was the urbane architect Adam Cartwright (Pernell Roberts), who built the ranch house; the second was the warm and lovable giant Eric "Hoss" Cartwright (Dan Blocker); and the youngest was the hotheaded and impetuous Joseph, or "Little Joe" (Michael Landon). Through exposition and flashback episodes, the viewer learns that each wife was accorded a different ancestry: English, Swedish, and French Creole, respectively. The family's cook was Chinese immigrant Hop Sing (Victor Sen Yung).

The family lived on a thousand-square-mile (2,600 km^{2}) ranch called the Ponderosa on the eastern shore of Lake Tahoe in Nevada opposite California on the edge of the Sierra Nevada range. The vast size of the Cartwrights' land was quietly revised to "half a million acres" (2,000 km^{2}) in Lorne Greene's 1964 song, "Saga of the Ponderosa". The ranch name refers to the Pinus ponderosa (ponderosa pine), common in the West. The nearest town to the Ponderosa was Virginia City, where the Cartwrights would go to converse with Sheriff Roy Coffee (played by veteran actor Ray Teal), or his deputy Clem Foster (Bing Russell).

Bonanza was considered an atypical Western for its time, as the core of the storylines dealt less about the range but more with Ben and his three dissimilar sons, how they cared for one another, their neighbors and just causes.

"You always saw stories about family on comedies or on an anthology, but Bonanza was the first series that was week-to-week about a family and the troubles it went through. Bonanza was a period drama that attempted to confront contemporary social issues. That was very difficult to do on television. Most shows that tried to do it failed because the sponsors didn't like it, and the networks were nervous about getting letters," explains Stephen Battaglio, a senior editor for TV Guide magazine.

== Cast ==
Though not familiar stars in 1959, the cast quickly became favorites of the first television generation. The order of billing at the beginning of the broadcast appeared to be shuffled randomly each week, with no relation whatsoever to the current episode featured that week.

List indicator

This section includes characters who will appear or have appeared in at least one season of the series.

- A green cell indicates the actor is a main cast member.
- A red cell indicates the actor is a recurring cast member.
- A light blue cell indicates the actor is a guest or special guest cast member.

=== Main cast ===
Performer	Character	Seasons													
Performer	Character	1	2	3	4	5	6	7	8	9	10	11	12	13	14
Lorne Greene	Ben Cartwright	Main	Main	Main	Main	Main	Main	Main	Main	Main	Main	Main	Main	Main	Main
Pernell Roberts	Adam Cartwright	Main	Main	Main	Main	Main	Main								
Dan Blocker	Eric "Hoss" Cartwright	Main	Main	Main	Main	Main	Main	Main	Main	Main	Main	Main	Main	Main	
Michael Landon	Joseph "Little Joe" Cartwright	Main	Main	Main	Main	Main	Main	Main	Main	Main	Main	Main	Main	Main	Main
David Canary	"Candy" Canaday									Recurring	Main	Main	Guest		Main
Mitch Vogel	Jamie Hunter Cartwright												Main	Main	Main
Tim Matheson	Griff King														Main

=== Recurring cast ===
Performer	Character	Seasons													
Performer	Character	1	2	3	4	5	6	7	8	9	10	11	12	13	14
Victor Sen Yung	Hop Sing	Recurring	Guest	Recurring	Recurring	Recurring	Recurring	Recurring	Recurring	Recurring	Recurring	Recurring	Recurring	Recurring	Recurring
Roy Engel	Dr. Paul (J.P.) Martin (Note: Roy Engel, Grandon Rhodes, and Harry Holcombe all appeared as a number of different doctors during the series. Most often, it was Dr. Paul Martin or Dr. J.P. Martin. Other derivative names included Doctor Martin and Doc Martin. Other credited names by the same actors included, Dr. Paul Kay, Doc Tolliver, Dr. Wayne, Dr. Harris, and Dr. Lewis)	Recurring	Recurring	Recurring	Recurring	Recurring				Guest		Recurring			
Grandon Rhodes	Dr. Paul (J.P.) Martin	Guest			Guest	Recurring	Recurring	Recurring	Recurring	Guest	Guest				
Harry Holcombe	Dr. Paul (J.P.) Martin										Guest	Recurring	Recurring	Recurring	Recurring
Ray Teal	Sheriff Roy Coffee		Recurring	Recurring	Recurring	Recurring	Recurring	Recurring	Recurring	Recurring	Recurring	Recurring	Recurring	Recurring	
Bing Russell	Deputy Clem Foster				Recurring	Guest	Guest	Guest	Recurring	Recurring	Recurring	Recurring	Recurring	Recurring	Recurring
Kathie Browne	Laura Dayton					Recurring									
Katie Sweet	Peggy Dayton					Recurring									
Guy Williams	Will Cartwright					Recurring									
Lou Frizzell	Dusty Rhodes										Guest	Guest	Recurring	Guest	

== Episodes ==
Overview of Bonanza seasons
Season	Episodes	Originally released		Rank	Rating	Average viewership (in millions)	Timeslot (ET)
Season	Episodes	First released	Last released	Rank	Rating	Average viewership (in millions)	Timeslot (ET)
1	32	September 12, 1959	April 30, 1960	—N/a	—N/a	—N/a	Saturday 7:30 p.m.
2	34	September 10, 1960	June 3, 1961	17	24.8	11.7	TBA
3	34	September 24, 1961	May 20, 1962	2	30.0	14.6	Sunday 9:00 p.m.
4	34	September 23, 1962	May 26, 1963	4	29.8 (Note: Tied with The Lucy Show)	15.0	TBA
5	34	September 22, 1963	May 24, 1964	2	36.9	19.0	TBA
6	34	September 20, 1964	May 23, 1965	1	36.3	19.1	TBA
7	33	September 12, 1965	May 15, 1966	1	31.8	17.1	TBA
8	34	September 11, 1966	May 14, 1967	1	29.1	16.0	TBA
9	34	September 17, 1967	July 28, 1968	4	25.5 (Note: Gunsmoke and Family Affair)	14.5	TBA
10	30	September 15, 1968	May 11, 1969	3	26.6	15.5	TBA
11	28	September 14, 1969	April 19, 1970	3	24.8	14.5	TBA
12	28	September 13, 1970	April 11, 1971	9	23.9	14.4	TBA
13	26	September 19, 1971	April 2, 1972	20	21.9	13.6	TBA
14	16	September 12, 1972	January 16, 1973	50	17.0	—N/a	Tuesday 8:00 p.m.

== Background and production ==
=== Set and filming ===
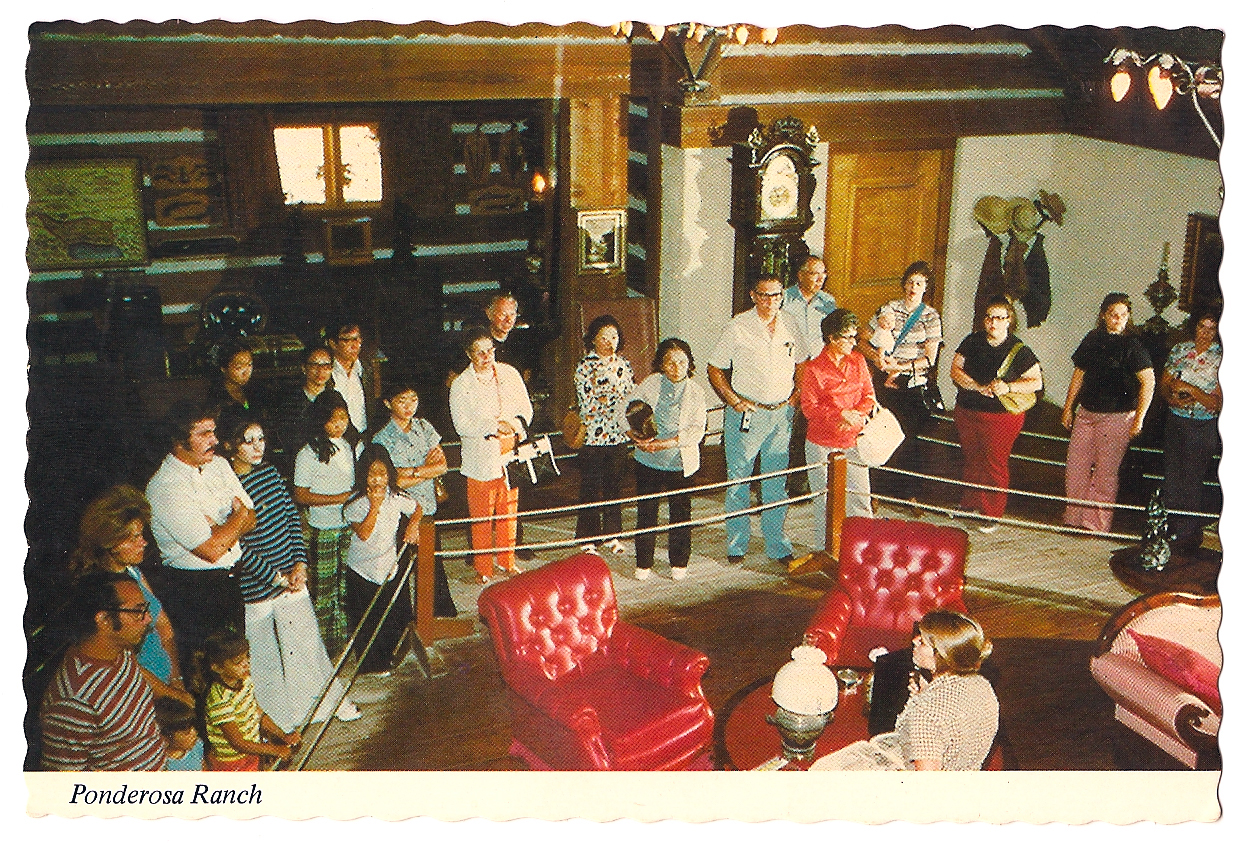
Ponderosa tour postcard – visitors tour the replica ranchhouse and its big living room with stone fireplace overlooking the east shore of Lake Tahoe, in Incline Village, Nevada where several rebuilt ranch buildings were used as a set for outside filming.

The opening scene for the first season was shot at Lake Hemet, a reservoir in the San Jacinto Mountains, Riverside County, California, and later moved to Lake Tahoe. After moving to Lake Tahoe, the opening sequence with theme music was filmed on the east side of Lake Tahoe in Bourne's meadow near Round Hill, Nevada. During the first season extra horses were rented from the Idyllwild Stables in Idyllwild, also in the San Jacinto Mountains. The first Virginia City set was used on the show until 1970 and was located on a backlot at Paramount and featured in episodes of Have Gun – Will Travel, Mannix and The Brady Bunch. In the 1970 premiere episode of the 12th season titled "The Night Virginia City Died", Deputy Clem Foster's pyromaniac fiancée levels the town in a series of fires (reflecting a real 1875 fire that destroyed three-quarters of Virginia City). This allowed for a switch to the less expensive Warner studios from September 1970 through January 1973. The script was initially written for the departing David Canary's Candy, but was rewritten for actors Ray Teal (Sheriff Roy Coffee) and Bing Russell (Deputy Clem Foster), who rarely appeared together on the show.

The program's Nevada set, the Ponderosa Ranch house, was recreated in Incline Village, Nevada, in 1967, and remained a tourist attraction until its sale thirty-seven years later in September 2004.

The series was also partially filmed in Wildwood Regional Park in Thousand Oaks, California.

=== Costumes ===
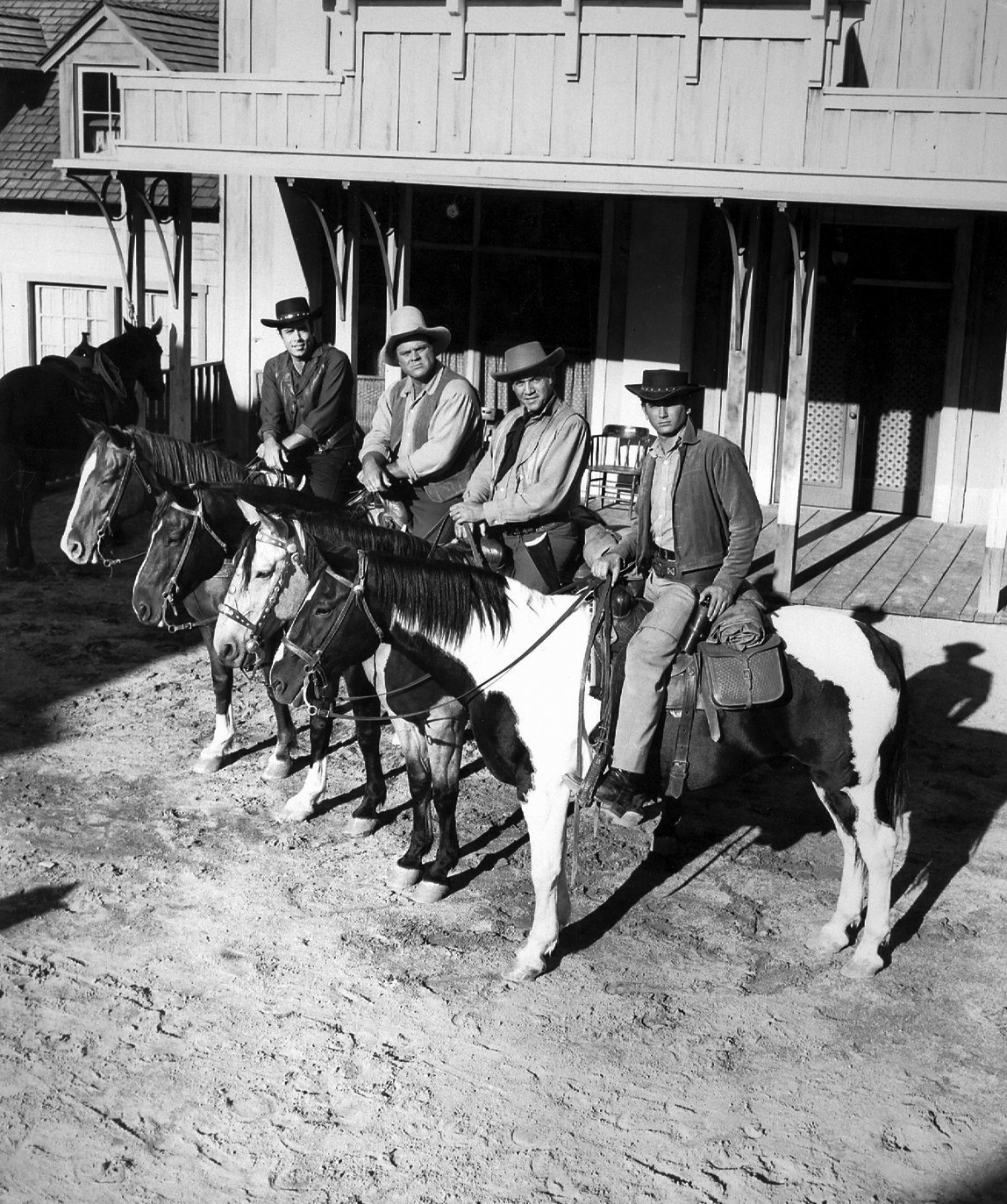
Pernell Roberts, Dan Blocker, Lorne Greene and Michael Landon (1961)

The Cartwrights and nearly every other recurring character on the show wore the same clothing in almost every episode, starting in the third season. The reason for this is twofold: it made duplication of wardrobe easier for stunt doubles (Hal Burton, Bob Miles, Bill Clark, Lyle Heisler, Ray Mazy) and it cut the cost of refilming action shots (such as riding clips in-between scenes), as previously shot stock footage could be reused. Below is a survey of costumes employed:

- Ben Cartwright: Sandy shirt, tawny leather vest, gray pants, cream-colored hat, occasional green scarf.
- Adam Cartwright: Black shirt, black or midnight blue pants, black hat. Elegant city wear. Cream-colored trail coat.
- Hoss Cartwright: White shirt, brown suede vest, brown pants, large beige flat-brimmed, ten-gallon hat.
- Little Joe Cartwright: Beige, light gray shirt, kelly-green jacket, tan pants, beige hat. Black leather gloves from 10th season on. In season 14, he and Greene occasionally wore different shirts and slacks, as the footage of them and the late Dan Blocker together could no longer be reused.
- Candy Canaday: Crimson shirt, black pants, black leather vest, black hat, grey/ pale purple scarf.

It was not unusual for Little Joe Cartwright and Candy Canaday to appear shirtless in various scenes involving manual labor.

The horse saddles used by the Bonanza cast were made by the Bona Allen Company of Buford, Georgia.

=== Hair styles ===
In 1968, Blocker began wearing a toupee on the series, as he was approaching age 40 and his hair loss was becoming more evident. He joined the ranks of his fellow co-stars Roberts and Greene, both of whom had begun the series with hairpieces. (Greene wore his modest frontal piece in private life too, whereas Roberts preferred not wearing his, even to rehearsals/blocking.) Landon was the only original cast member who was wig-free throughout the series, as even Sen Yung wore an attached rattail- queue.

=== Music ===
Bonanza features a memorable theme song by Jay Livingston and Ray Evans that was orchestrated by David Rose and arranged by Billy May for the television series. Members of the Western Writers of America chose it as one of the Top 100 Western songs of all time.

The Bonanza theme song opens with a blazing Ponderosa map and saddlebound Cartwrights. The melodic intro, emulating galloping horses, is one of the most recognized television scores. Variations of the theme were used for 12 seasons on the series. Although there were two official sets of lyrics (some country-western singers, avoiding royalties, substituted the copyright renditions with their own words), the series simply used an instrumental theme. Three of the cast members bellowed out the original lyrics, unaccompanied, at the close of the pilot (Pernell Roberts, the sole professional singer of the quartet, abstained and untethered the horse reins). Before the pilot aired (on September 12, 1959), the song sequence, deemed too campy, was edited out of the scene and instead the Cartwrights headed back to the ranch whooping and howling. In a 1964 song, the Livingston-Evans lyrics were revised by Lorne Greene with a more familial emphasis, "on this land we put our brand, Cartwright is the name, fortune smiled the day we filed the Ponderosa claim".

In 1968, a slightly revamped horn and percussion-heavy arrangement of the original score introduced the series, which was used until 1970. A new theme song, called "The Big Bonanza" was written in 1970 by episode scorer David Rose, and was used from 1970 to 1972. Action-shot pictorials of the cast replaced the galloping trio with the order of the actors rotating from episode to episode, resulting in Blocker or Landon often getting top billing over Greene. Finally, a faster rendition of the original music returned for the 14th and final season, along with action shots of the cast (sans Dan Blocker, who had died by this point).

=== Cancellation ===
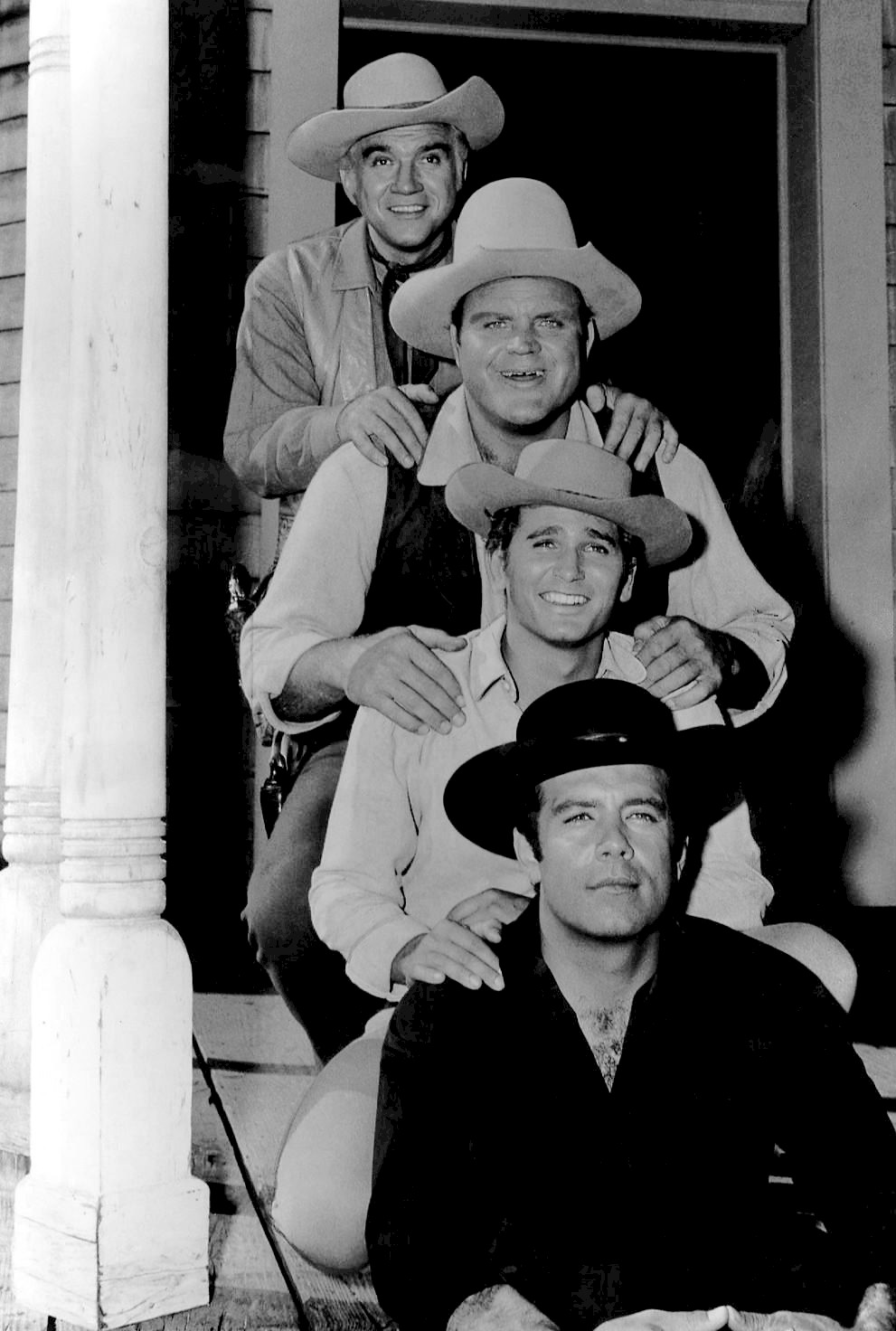
Front to back: Pernell Roberts, Michael Landon, Dan Blocker and Lorne Greene

In the fall of 1972, NBC moved Bonanza to Tuesday nights—where reruns from the 1967–1970 period had been broadcast the previous summer under the title Ponderosa—opposite the All in the Family spinoff show, Maude, which was a virtual death sentence for the program. The scheduling change, as well as Dan Blocker's death in May 1972, resulted in plunging ratings for the show. David Canary returned to his former role of Candy (to offset Hoss' absence), and a new character named Griff King (played by Tim Matheson) was added in an attempt to lure younger viewers. Griff, in prison for nearly killing his abusive stepfather, was paroled into Ben's custody and given a job as a ranch hand. Several episodes were built around his character, one that Matheson never had a chance to fully develop before the show was abruptly cancelled in November 1972 (with the final episode airing January 16, 1973). Many fans, as well as both Landon and Greene, felt that the character of Hoss was essential, as he was a nurturing, empathetic soul who rounded out the all-male cast.

For 14 years, Bonanza was the premier Western on American television. Reruns of the series have aired on several cable networks such as TV Land, INSP, Family Channel, the Hallmark Channel and Great American Faith & Living.

== Themes ==
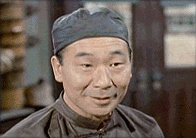
Philip Ahn in "The Fear Merchants"

The season two episode "Day of Reckoning" shows the native population with nuance, as individuals have distinct motives and discuss ethical issues involved in working with or resisting white colonialism, at a time when racial subtleties like this were not common on broadcast television. The protagonist is Mexican actor Ricardo Montalbán.

Episodes ranged from high drama to broad comedy and addressed issues such as the environment, substance abuse, domestic violence, anti-war sentiment, and illegitimate births. The series sought to illustrate the cruelty of bigotry against Asians, African Americans, Native Americans, Jews, Mormons, the disabled, and little people.

Bonanza is uniquely known for having addressed racism, not typically covered on American television during the time period, from a compassionate, humanitarian point-of-view.

Bigotry, including antisemitism, was the subject of the episode "Look to the Stars". A bigoted school teacher Mr. Norton (oblivious to his prejudice) routinely expels minority students. When he expels the brilliant Jewish student Albert Michelson, a scientific genius whose experiments on the streets of Virginia City often cause commotion, Ben Cartwright steps in and confronts Norton on his bigotry. Ashamed, the schoolteacher vows to reform. A coda to the episode reveals that Michelson went on to win the Nobel Prize for Physics.

In the episode "Enter Thomas Bowers", the Cartwright family helps the opera singer Thomas Bowers, an African-American freedman, after he encounters prejudice while in Virginia City to perform. Bowers winds up arrested as a fugitive slave. At the beginning of the episode, Adam is shown to be outraged at the Supreme Court's Dred Scott v. Sandford decision (placing the time as 1857), which he discusses with his father. According to David Dortort, sponsor General Motors was anxious about the episode. As producer, Dortort ensured that the episode re-aired during the summer rerun seasons, though two TV stations in the South refused to air it.

In the episode "The Wish", directed by Michael Landon, Hoss protects an African-American former slave's family when confronted with racism after the American Civil War. In "The Fear Merchants", discrimination against Chinese immigrants who attempt to assimilate in American society is addressed. "The Lonely Man" presents the controversial interracial marriage between the Cartwrights' longtime Chinese chef (Hop Sing) and a white woman (Missy).

== Release ==
=== Broadcast history and ratings ===
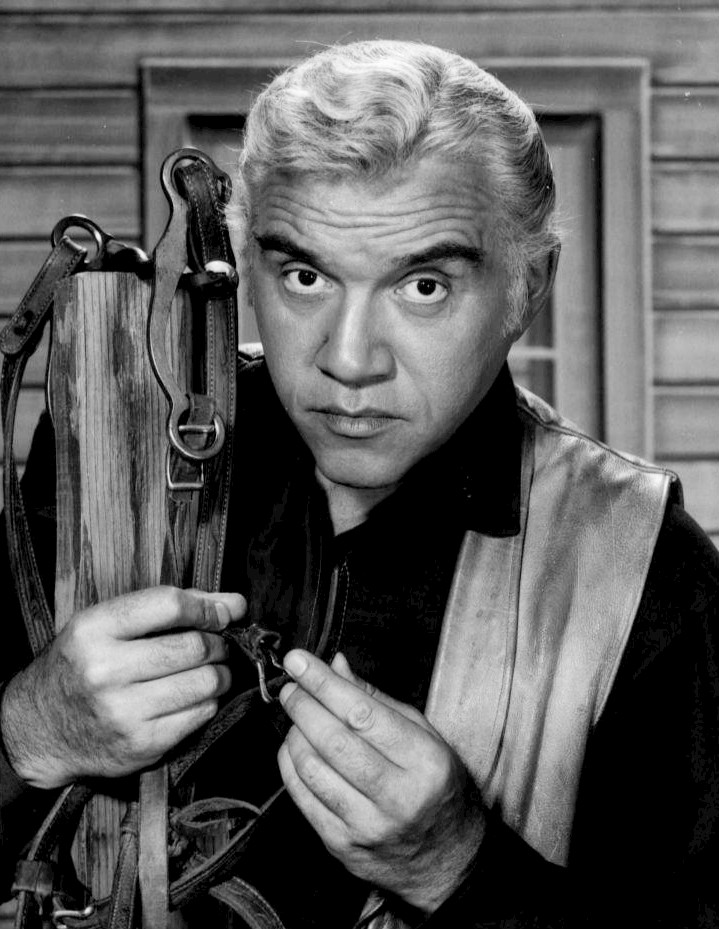
Lorne Greene as Ben Cartwright

Initially, Bonanza aired on Saturdays at 7:30 p.m. Eastern, opposite Dick Clark's Saturday Night Beech-Nut Show and John Gunther's High Road on ABC, and Perry Mason on CBS. Bonanza's initial ratings were respectable, often coming in behind Mason but ahead of the ABC lineup. Ironically, executives considered canceling the show before its premiere because of its high cost. NBC kept it because Bonanza was one of the first series to be filmed and broadcast in color, including scenes of picturesque Lake Tahoe, Nevada. NBC's corporate parent, Radio Corporation of America (RCA), used the show to spur sales of RCA-manufactured color television sets (RCA was also the primary sponsor of the series during its first two seasons).

For Season 3, NBC moved Bonanza to Sundays at 9:00 pm Eastern with new sponsor Chevrolet (replacing The Dinah Shore Chevy Show). The new time slot caused Bonanza to soar in the ratings, and it eventually reached number one by 1964, an honor it would keep until 1967. By 1970, Bonanza was the first series to appear in the Top Five list for nine consecutive seasons (a record that would stand for many years) and thus established itself as the most consistent strong-performing hit television series of the 1960s. Bonanza remained high on the Nielsen ratings until 1971, when it finally fell out of the Top Ten.

During the summer of 1972, NBC broadcast reruns of episodes of the show from the 1967–1970 era on Tuesdays at 7:30 p.m. under the title Ponderosa while also rerunning more recent episodes on Sunday evenings in the show's normal time slot as Bonanza. In the fall of 1972, off-network episodes were released in broadcast syndication to local stations by NBC under the Ponderosa name. After the series was canceled in 1973, the syndicated reruns reverted to the Bonanza name.

==== International ====
An author in 1972 wrote that "Nothing can touch Bonanza, which is watched week in week out by 400 million people in eighty-two countries, from Poland to the Philippines from Nigeria to Nicaragua". Television in the Soviet Union was unusual among Communist countries in not broadcasting Bonanza. Television in Ethiopia broadcast the show without dubbing or subtitles, which the station could not afford; the director of programs said that the story was so simple that his father enjoyed the show despite not knowing English.

=== Home media ===
A handful of early episodes have fallen into the public domain. These episodes have been released by several companies in different configurations, with substandard picture and sound quality, edited, and by legal necessity with the copyright-protected Evans–Livingston theme song replaced with generic western music.

In 1973, NBC sold its NBC Films syndication division, and with it the rights to the series, along with the rest of its pre-1973 library, to National Telefilm Associates, which changed its name to Republic Pictures in 1984. Republic would become part of the Spelling Entertainment organization in 1994 through Worldvision Enterprises. Select episodes ("The Best of Bonanza") were officially released in North America in 2003 on DVD through then-Republic video licensee Artisan Entertainment (which was later purchased by Lionsgate Home Entertainment). Republic (through CBS Media Ventures, which holds the television side of Republic's holdings) still retains the syndication distribution rights to the series. CBS Home Entertainment (under Paramount Home Media Distribution) is the official home video rights distributor at present.

Starting in September 2009, CBS Home Entertainment (distributed by Paramount) has to date released the first eleven seasons on DVD in Region 1. All episodes have been digitally remastered from original 35 mm film elements to yield the best picture and sound quality possible with current technology. CBSHE has released each season in two-volume sets (available together and separately). On May 23, 2023, the remaining seasons 12, 13 and 14 were released on DVD, as well as a box set of the complete series containing all 431 episodes on 112 DVDs.

In Region 2, AL!VE AG released the first seven seasons on DVD in Germany between 2008 and 2010. These releases are now out of print as AL!VE has lost the rights. In 2011, StudioCanal acquired the rights to the series and have begun re-releasing it on DVD, and all seasons have now been released but have not been remastered.

Episodes of the series have also been officially released as part-works on DVD in France and the United Kingdom.

Bonanza "the official first season" was released in Scandinavia during 2010. The first season is released in 4 volumes. The first two volumes were released on October 20, 2010, and the second two volumes on April 27, 2011.

Region 1 DVD releases of Bonanza
DVD name	Ep #	Release date
The Official 1st Season, Vol. 1	16	September 15, 2009
The Official 1st Season, Vol. 2	16	September 15, 2009
The Official 2nd Season, Vol. 1	18	December 7, 2010
The Official 2nd Season, Vol. 2	16	October 11, 2011
The Official 3rd Season, Vol. 1	18	July 17, 2012
The Official 3rd Season, Vol. 2	16	July 17, 2012
The Official 4th Season, Vol. 1	18	October 2, 2012
The Official 4th Season, Vol. 2	16	October 2, 2012
The Official 5th Season, Vol. 1	18	February 12, 2013
The Official 5th Season, Vol. 2	16	February 12, 2013
The Official 6th Season, Vol. 1	18	July 9, 2013
The Official 6th Season, Vol. 2	16	July 9, 2013
The Official 7th Season, Vol. 1	15	September 2, 2014
The Official 7th Season, Vol. 2	18	September 2, 2014
The Official 8th Season, Vol. 1	18	June 2, 2015
The Official 8th Season, Vol. 2	16	June 2, 2015
The Official 9th Season, Vol. 1	16	May 7, 2019
The Official 9th Season, Vol. 2	18	May 7, 2019
The Official 10th Season, Vol. 1	15	December 17, 2019
The Official 10th Season, Vol. 2	15	December 17, 2019
The Official 11th Season, Vol. 1	16	October 27, 2020
The Official 11th Season, Vol. 2	12	October 27, 2020
The Official 12th Season	28	May 23, 2023
The Official 13th Season	26	May 23, 2023
The Official 14th Season	16	May 23, 2023
The Official Complete Series	431	May 23, 2023

Region 2 DVD releases of Bonanza
Season	Release dates	
Season	Germany	Scandinavia
Season 1	December 8, 2011	December 20, 2010; April 27, 2011
Season 2	February 16, 2012	No release of seasons 2–14
Season 3	April 19, 2012	
Season 4	June 21, 2012	
Season 5	August 23, 2012	
Season 6	October 18, 2012	
Season 7	November 1, 2012	
Seasons 1–7	December 6, 2012	
Season 8	January 24, 2013	
Season 9	February 21, 2013	
Season 10	April 18, 2013	
Season 11	June 6, 2013	
Season 12	August 1, 2013	
Season 13	October 2, 2013	
Season 14	November 21, 2013	
Seasons 8–14	December 5, 2013	

Region 4 DVD releases of Bonanza
DVD name	Ep #	Release date
Season 1	32	November 2, 2011
Season 2	34	February 8, 2012
Season 3	34	May 9, 2012
Season 4	34	October 3, 2012
Season 5	34	January 15, 2014
Season 6	34	February 10, 2016
Season 7	33	May 4, 2016
Season 8	34	February 6, 2019
Season 9	34	August 7, 2019
Season 10	30	March 18, 2020
Season 1–4	134	November 18, 2020
Season 11	28	February 17, 2021
Season 12	28	August 23, 2023

== Other media information ==
=== Television movies ===
Bonanza was revived for a series of three made-for-television movies featuring the Cartwrights' children: Bonanza: The Next Generation (1988), Bonanza: The Return (1993) and Bonanza: Under Attack (1995). Michael Landon Jr. played Little Joe's son Benji while Gillian Greene, Lorne Greene's daughter, played a love interest. In the second movie, airing on NBC, a one-hour retrospective was done to introduce the drama. It was hosted by both Michael Landon Jr. and Dirk Blocker, who looks and sounds almost exactly like his father, Dan Blocker, albeit without his father's towering height. According to the magazine TV Guide, producer David Dortort told Blocker he was too old to play the Hoss scion, but gave him the role of an unrelated newspaper reporter. Clips of the younger Blocker's appearance and voice were heavily used in advertisements promoting the "second generation" theme, perhaps misleading audiences to believe that Blocker was playing Hoss' heir. Hoss' son Josh was born out of wedlock, as it is explained that Hoss drowned without knowing his fiancėe was pregnant. Such a storyline might have been problematic in the original series. (The Big Valley, however, had a major character in Heath, who was presented as illegitimate.) The Gunsmoke movies of the early 1990s employed a similar theme when Marshal Matt Dillon learned he had sired Michael Learned's character's daughter in a short-lived romance. The initial story was first introduced in 1973, when depiction of fornication courted protests, so CBS insisted their hero Matt have the encounter when he had amnesia. As was the style of television Westerns, gunfights played a major role in the movies which featured notoriously inaccurate shooting as well as unlimited ammunition.

=== Prequel ===
In 2001, there was an attempt to revive the Bonanza concept with a prequel, The Ponderosa—not to be confused with the 1972 summer reruns under the title Ponderosa—with a pilot directed by Simon Wincer and filmed in Australia. Covering the time when the Cartwrights first arrived at the Ponderosa, when Adam and Hoss were teenagers and Joe a little boy, the series lasted 20 episodes and featured less gunfire and brawling than the original. Bonanza creator David Dortort approved PAX TV (now Ion TV)'s decision to hire Beth Sullivan, formerly of Dr. Quinn, Medicine Woman, which some believe gave the series more depth as well as a softer edge. The Hop Sing character is depicted not only as a cook but also a family counselor and herbal healer. The series takes place in Nevada Territory in 1849, which is actually an anachronism. The Nevada Territory did not split from the Utah Territory until 1861, meaning that until at least the 5th season (the episode "Enter Thomas Bowers" establishes that year as 1857), Bonanza is also set in what in real life would have been Utah Territory.

=== Bonanza merchandise ===
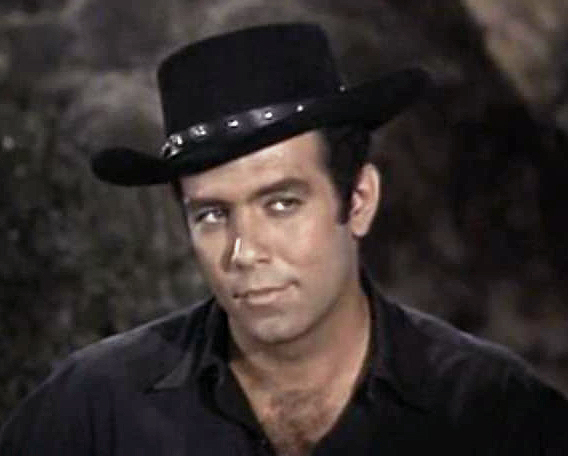
Pernell Roberts as Adam in "The Hopefuls"

Bonanza has been the subject of extensive merchandising and licensing. Bonanza Ventures, Inc. grants merchandising and licensing rights worldwide. Merchandising associated with the series has included novelty western and folk albums released from 1962 to 1965 including "Bonanza, Christmas on the Ponderosa", which reached #35 on Billboard's Christmas Record album chart; Dell and Gold Key comic books published from 1962 to 1970; a comic book adaptation by Dutch artist Hans G. Kresse from 1965 to 1966, Jim Beam Whiskey Ponderosa Ranch decanters from 1964 to 1966; "Big-Little" books from 1966 to 1969; Revell model character sets from 1966 to 1968; American Character action figures from 1966 to 1967; Aladdin lunch buckets and thermos bottles from 1966 to 1968; View-Master slide sets released in 1964 and 1971; Ponderosa tin cups produced from 1967 to 2004; Hamilton collector plates from 1989 to 1990; and Breyer Fiftieth Anniversary Ponderosa Stable sets, with horses and Cartwright figures produced from 2009 to 2011. The franchise has also been associated with the Bonanza and Ponderosa steakhouse chain, and the Lake Tahoe-based "Ponderosa" theme park, which operated from 1967 to 2004.

Fourteen Bonanza novels have been published:

- Bonanza: A Novel by Noel Loomis (1960);
- Bonanza: One Man With Courage by Thomas Thompson (1966);
- Bonanza: Killer Lion by Steve Frazee (1966);
- Bonanza: Treachery Trail by Harry Whittington (1968);
- Winter Grass by Dean Owen (1968);
- Ponderosa Kill by Dean Owen (1968);
- The Pioneer Spirit by Stephen Calder (1988);
- The Ponderosa Empire by Stephen Calder (1991);
- Bonanza: The High Steel Hazard by Stephen Calder (1993);
- Journey of the Horse by Stephen Calder (1993);
- The Money Hole by Stephen Calder (1993);
- The Trail to Timberline by Stephen Calder (1994);
- Bonanza: Felling of the Sons by Monette L. Bebow-Reinhard (2005),
- Bonanza: Mystic Fire by Monette L. Bebow-Reinhard (2009).

There is also a collection of Bonanza stories: The Best of Bonanza World: A Book of Favorite Stories, published by CreateSpace Independent Publishing Platform (2012), and in the late 1960s and early 1970s, Whitman Books published several hardcover novels aimed at young readers, such as Killer Lion by Steve Frazer (1966). Bonanza Gold (2003–2009), a quarterly magazine, featured detailed information about the show, including interviews with guest actors and other production personnel, articles about historical events and people depicted in the series, fan club information and fan fiction. All 14 seasons of the show (as of 5/2023) are available on DVD, as well as 31 non-successive public-domain episodes (without original theme music). The public domain episodes consist of the last 14 episodes of season one, and the first 17 episodes of season two. Additionally, the prequel series, The Ponderosa, as well as the three sequel movies (see below), are all available on DVD.

== Legacy ==
In the TV series Maverick episode "Three Queens Full", Bart (Jack Kelly) is blackmailed by Joe Wheelwright (Jim Backus), owner of the Subrosa ranch, into escorting mail order brides for Wheelwright's three sons Aaron, Moose and Small Paul.

== Accolades ==
=== Awards and nominations ===
Award	Year (Note: Indicates the year of ceremony. Each year is linked to the article about the awards held that year, wherever possible.)	Category	Nominee(s) / Work	Result	Ref(s)
American Cinema Editors (ACE) Eddie Awards	1964	Best Edited Television Program	Marvin Coil (for "Hoss and the Leprechaun")	Nominated	
American Cinema Editors (ACE) Eddie Awards	1970	Best Edited Television Program	Danny B. Landres (for "Dead Wrong")	Nominated	
Bambi Awards	1969	TV series International	Lorne Greene, Dan Blocker, Michael Landon and Pernell Roberts	Won	
Golden Globe Awards	1964	Best Series – Drama	Bonanza	Nominated	
Golden Globe Awards	1964	Best TV Star – Male	Lorne Greene	Nominated	
Primetime Creative Arts Emmy Awards	1962	Outstanding Achievement in Cinematography for Television	Haskell Boggs and Walter Castle	Nominated	
Primetime Creative Arts Emmy Awards	1963	Outstanding Achievement in Art Direction and Scenic Design	Earl Hedrick (scenic designer) and Hal Pereira (art director)	Nominated	
Primetime Creative Arts Emmy Awards	1965	Outstanding Individual Achievements in Entertainment – Cinematographer	Haskell Boggs and William Whitley	Nominated	
Primetime Creative Arts Emmy Awards	1965	Outstanding Individual Achievements in Entertainment – Color Consultant	Edward Ancona	Won	
Primetime Creative Arts Emmy Awards	1966	Outstanding Dramatic Series	David Dortort (producer)	Nominated	
Primetime Creative Arts Emmy Awards	1966	Individual Achievements in Music – Composition	David Rose	Nominated	
Primetime Creative Arts Emmy Awards	1966	Individual Achievements in Cinematography – Cinematography	Haskell Boggs and William F. Whitley	Nominated	
Primetime Creative Arts Emmy Awards	1966	Individual Achievements in Cinematography – Special	Edward Ancona (color coordinator)	Nominated	
Primetime Creative Arts Emmy Awards	1966	Individual Achievements in Film Editing	Marvin Coil, Everett Douglas and Ellsworth Hoagland	Won	
Primetime Creative Arts Emmy Awards	1967	Individual Achievements in Cinematography – Cinematography	Haskell Boggs and William F. Whitley	Nominated	
Primetime Creative Arts Emmy Awards	1971	Outstanding Achievement in Music Composition – For a Series or a Single Program of a Series (First Year of Music's Use Only)	David Rose (for "The Love Child")	Won	
Primetime Creative Arts Emmy Awards	1971	Outstanding Achievement in Cinematography for Entertainment Programming – For a Series or a Single Program of a Series	Ted Voigtlander (for "The Love Child")	Nominated	
Troféu Imprensa Awards	1965	Best Series (Melhor Série)	Bonanza	Won	
Troféu Imprensa Awards	1966	Best Series (Melhor Série)	Bonanza	Nominated	
TV Land Icon Awards	2003	Best in the West	Bonanza	Won	
TV Land Icon Awards	2006	Favorite Made-for-TV Maid	Victor Sen Yung	Nominated	
TV Week Logie Awards	1964	Best Overseas Show (Australia)	Bonanza	Won	
Western Heritage Awards	1970	Bronze Wrangler Award for Fictional Television Drama	David Dortort, Michael Landon, Richard Collins, Lorne Greene, Dan Blocker, Ossie Davis, Roy Jenson, Harrison Page, Barbara Parrio, George Spell and Jerry Summers (for "The Wish")	Won	
Writers Guild of America (WGA) Awards	1961	Episodic, Longer than 30 Minutes in Length	Donald S. Sanford (for "The Last Hunt")	Nominated	

=== Other honors ===
Year	Organization	Title	Notes	Ref(s)
2011	Online Film & Television Association (OFTA)	Television Hall of Fame: Productions	Inductee	

== See also ==
- 1959 in television

== General bibliography ==
- Bonanza: A Viewers Guide to the TV Legend by David Greenland. 167 pages. Publisher: Crosslines Inc (June 1997). ISBN 978-0-9640338-2-5.
- A Reference Guide to Television's Bonanza: Episodes, Personnel, and Broadcast History by Bruce R. Leiby and Linda F. Leiby. 384 pages. Publisher: McFarland (March 1, 2005). ISBN 978-0-7864-2268-5.
- Bonanza: The Definitive Ponderosa Companion by Melany Shapiro. 176 pages. Publisher: Cyclone Books; illustrated edition (September 1997). ISBN 978-1-890723-18-7.
- Mavis, Paul (September 15, 2009). "Bonanza: The Official First Season, Volume 1".
