= Dan Riss =

American actor (1910-1970)

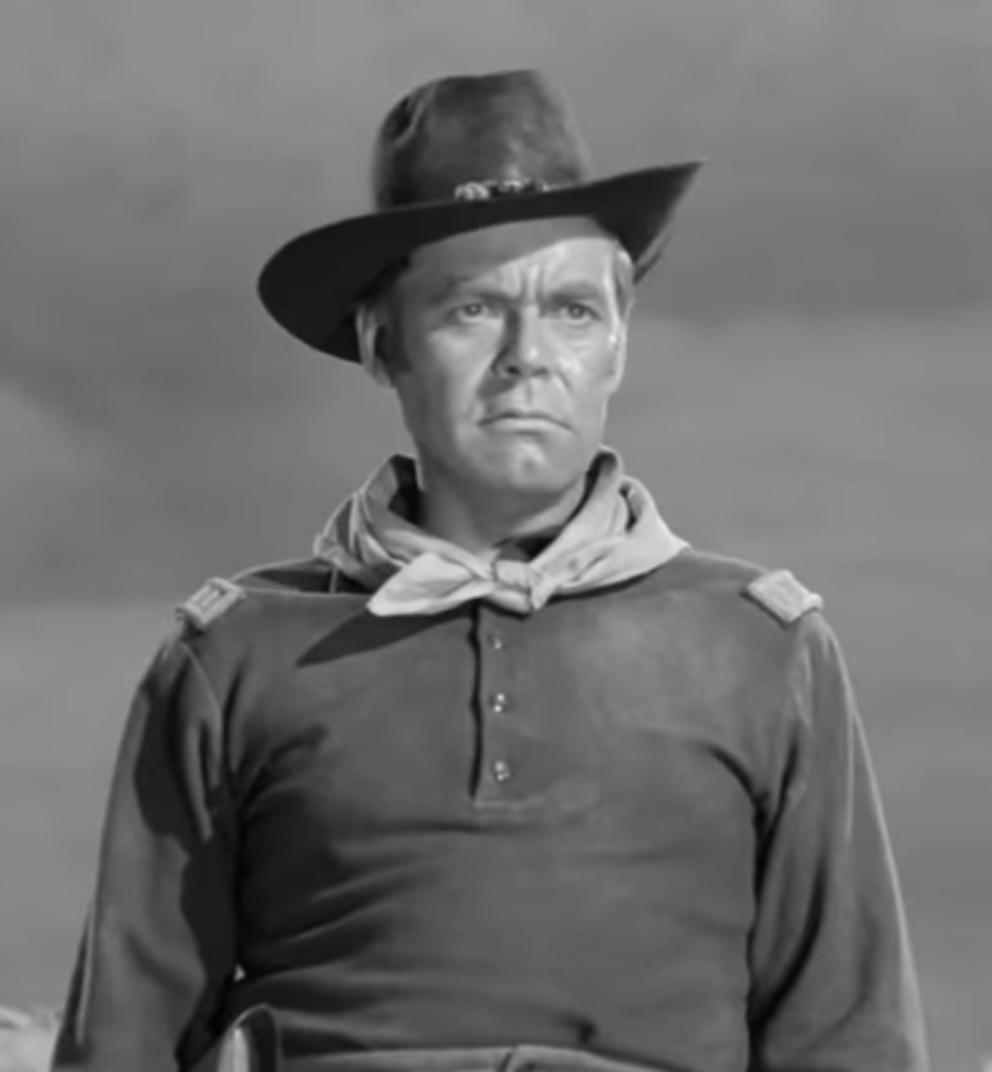
- Riss in Only the Valiant (1951)
- Born: Frederic Daniel Riss; March 22, 1910; Streator, Illinois, U.S.
- Died: August 28, 1970 (aged 60); Hollywood, California, U.S.
- Occupation: Actor
- Years active: 1949–1965
- Spouse: Virginia Irene Morphew (m. 1939)
- Children: 2

Frederic Daniel Riss (March 22, 1910 – August 28, 1970) was an American actor who had a career from 1949 to 1965.

== Filmography ==
Year	Title	Role	Notes
1949	Pinky	Mr. Stanley - Wooleys' Attorney	Uncredited
1949	Arctic Fury	Director of the Thompson Institute	
1950	When Willie Comes Marching Home	Gen. Adams	Uncredited
1950	Appointment with Danger	Maury Ahearn	
1950	Love That Brute	District Attorney	Uncredited
1950	Panic in the Streets	Neff - Newspaper Reporter	
1950	Kiss Tomorrow Goodbye	District Attorney	
1950	The Killer That Stalked New York	Skrip	
1950	Wyoming Mail	George Armstrong	
1951	Two Lost Worlds	Narrator	Voice
1951	The Enforcer	The Mayor	Uncredited
1951	Fourteen Hours	Reporter	Uncredited
1951	Only the Valiant	Lt. Jerry Winters	
1951	Go for Broke!	Capt. Solari	
1951	Little Egypt	Prosecutor	
1951	Angels in the Outfield	Ed Kirney	Uncredited
1952	Talk About a Stranger	Mr. Taylor the Butcher	Uncredited
1952	Carbine Williams	Jesse Rimmer	
1952	Confidence Girl	Detective Lieutenant Fenton	
1952	Scarlet Angel	Walter Frisby	
1952	Washington Story	Bill Holmby	
1952	Operation Secret	German Sergeant	
1953	The Girl Who Had Everything	Counsel	Uncredited
1953	Man in the Dark	Jawald	
1953	Vice Squad	Lt. Bob Imlay	
1954	Riders to the Stars	Dr. Frank Werner	
1954	Three Young Texans	Sheriff Carter	
1954	Executive Suite	City Editor	Uncredited
1954	The Miami Story	Frank Alton	
1954	The Yellow Tomahawk	Sgt. Bandini	
1954	Human Desire	Prosecutor Gruber	Uncredited
1954	The Atomic Kid	Jim	Uncredited
1956	The Price of Fear	Police Lt. Jim Walsh	
1956	Johnny Concho	Judge Earl Tyler	
1957	Gunsmoke	Mike	TV Episode “Cain” (S2E24)
1957	Kelly and Me	Stu Baker	
1957	The Iron Sheriff	Dowd	Uncredited
1957	Man on Fire	Mack	
1957	The Hired Gun	Walt Bodie - Lawyer	Uncredited
1958	The Case Against Brooklyn	Rogers	Uncredited
1958	Perry Mason	Arthur West	S1E21: " The Case of the Green-Eyed Sister"
1958	Badman's Country	Marshal McAfee	
1958	Tarawa Beachhead	Harry	Uncredited
1958	The Power of the Resurrection	Thomas	
1959	Al Capone	Radio Announcer	Voice, Uncredited
1959	Battle of the Coral Sea	Naval Officer	Uncredited
1959	The Story on Page One	Court Clerk	Uncredited
1960	Cheyenne	Jeff Pierce	Episode: "The Long Rope"
1960	Ma Barker's Killer Brood	Baxter	
1960	Elmer Gantry	Radio Announcer	Uncredited
