= Hal Pereira =

American art director (1905–1983)

- Born: April 29, 1905; Chicago, Illinois, U.S.
- Died: December 17, 1983 (aged 78); Los Angeles, California, U.S.
- Occupations: art director and production designer
- Years active: 1944–1968

Hal Pereira (April 29, 1905 – December 17, 1983) was an American art director, production designer, and occasional architect.

== Biography ==
Pereira was born in Chicago, Illinois, the brother of William Pereira and son of Sarah (Friedberg) and Saul Pereira. He was educated at the University of Illinois, after which he started his career in theater design before moving to Los Angeles c. 1941, where he worked as a unit art director for Paramount Studios.

From the 1940s through the 1960s, Pereira worked on more than 200 films as an art director and production designer. In 1944, he art designed Double Indemnity, widely considered to be one of the greatest films of all time. By 1950, Pereira was supervising art director, where he remained until the late 1960s, when Paramount was reorganized by Gulf+Western. During this time, he worked on several notable films, including Shane, Academy Award for Best Picture winning The Greatest Show on Earth, almost every important Alfred Hitchcock film, and The Rose Tattoo, for which he won the Academy Award for best art direction for a black and white film. In total, Pereira was nominated for 23 Academy Awards throughout his career and he also served alongside Earl Hedrick as artistic director of the TV series Bonanza.

Pereira also worked occasionally as an architect. He began his architecture career in Chicago, where he partnered with his brother in 1931. Together, they worked on Esquire Theatre and a house for Charles Dewey Jr., son of Charles S. Dewey. Pereira left the partnership c. 1940, at which point he collaborated with Robert Law Weed and Edwin T. Reeder on Beach Theatre in Miami, Florida. He also remodeled Paramount Theatre's Metropolitan Annex in Los Angeles in 1941.

He died in Los Angeles, California.
