= John Furia Jr. =

American screenwriter

- Born: 1929
- Died: May 7, 2009 (aged 79)
- Occupation: Television writer
- Spouse: Mary
- Children: 7

John Furia Jr. (1929 – May 7, 2009) was an American television writer, whose credits included Bonanza, Hotel (co-developed with Barry Oringer), Hawaii Five-O, The Twilight Zone, Kung Fu, The Waltons and Dr. Kildare.

Furia graduated from Fordham University (where he participated in variety shows as a singer and actor) with a degree in Constitutional history. He then started writing for Playhouse 90, the DuPont Show of the Month, and Climax! After moving to California, he became a freelance writer for TV and movies, and also worked in production. In addition to the aforementioned shows, he also wrote for The Alcoa Hour, Bob Hope Presents the Chrysler Theatre, and Espionage. One of his most successful screenplays was The Singing Nun. He was offered positions as story editor several times, but declined them because they would have interfered with his writing work, until Jerry Thorpe asked him to become the story editor of Kung Fu.

Furia was elected President of the Writers Guild of America, West (WGA) from 1973 until 1975. He also served on the Writers Guild of America's board of directors for two terms. Furia co-chaired the WGA's negotiating committee on several occasions, including for the WGA's 2004 negotiations.

Furia received several honors from the WGA for his work, including the Morgan Cox, Valentine Davies and Edmund H. North awards for "leadership and guild service."

Additionally, Furia was a professor and director of film writing at the University of Southern California's School of Cinema and Television.

Furia died on May 7, 2009, at the age of 79.
