= A. Earl Hedrick =

American art director (1896–1985)

- Born: March 2, 1896; Los Angeles, California
- Died: September 18, 1985 (aged 89); Whittier, California
- Occupation: Art director
- Years active: 1932-1969

A. Earl Hedrick (March 2, 1896 – September 18, 1985) was an American art director. He was nominated for an Academy Award in the category Best Art Direction for the film The Proud and Profane.

== Selected filmography ==
- The Proud and Profane (1956)
