= List of Dr. Quinn, Medicine Woman episodes =

Dr. Quinn, Medicine Woman is an American Western drama series created by Beth Sullivan and starring Jane Seymour who plays Dr. Michaela "Mike" Quinn, a physician who leaves Boston in search of adventure in the Old American West and who settles in Colorado Springs, Colorado.

The television series ran on CBS for six seasons, from January 1, 1993, to May 16, 1998. During its entire original run, the show aired from 8–9 pm Eastern time on Saturday nights. Episodes typically range from 43 to 48 minutes in length (without including commercials) with the exception of the pilot episode and a few other which are around 1 hr and 30 minutes in length. Episodes were broadcast in standard definition. In total, 150 episodes were produced, plus two television movies which were made after the series was cancelled.

== Series overview ==
Season	Episodes	Originally released		Rank	Rating	Average viewers (millions)
Season	Episodes	First released	Last released	Rank	Rating	Average viewers (millions)
1	18	January 1, 1993	May 22, 1993	23	14.0	22.1
2	27	September 25, 1993	May 21, 1994	25	13.3	21.3
3	29	September 24, 1994	May 20, 1995	49	10.7	16.9
4	28	September 23, 1995	May 18, 1996	55	9.6	15.1
5	26	September 21, 1996	May 17, 1997	58	8.5	13.17
6	22	September 27, 1997	May 16, 1998	74	7.7	11.67
Dr. Quinn, Medicine Woman: The Movie		May 22, 1999		—N/a	8.0	12.00
Dr. Quinn, Medicine Woman: The Heart Within		May 12, 2001		—N/a	6.3	8.83

== Episodes ==
=== Season 1 (1993) ===
No. overall	No. in season	Title	Directed by	Written by	Original release date	Prod. code	US viewers (millions)
1	1	"Pilot"	Jeremy Kagan	Beth Sullivan	January 1, 1993	100	28.9
2	2	"Pilot"	Jeremy Kagan	Beth Sullivan	January 1, 1993	100	28.9
Dr. Mike leaves Boston for the 1860's American Frontier.
3	3	"Epidemic"	Chuck Bowman	Beth Sullivan	January 2, 1993	101	26.2
Dr. Mike falls ill as the result of a flu epidemic in town.
4	4	"The Visitor"	Victoria Hochberg	Cathleen Young	January 9, 1993	102	24.0
Dr. Mike's mother (Jane Wyman) visits, and has trouble accepting her daughter's new life.
5	5	"Law of the Land"	James Keach	Toni Perling	January 16, 1993	105	24.4
As the town prepares to hang a starving orphan (Christopher Kelly) for stealing a Cow, the new sheriff in town (Johnny Cash) arrives to prevent it.
6	6	"The Healing"	Gwen Arner	Sara Davidson & Toni Perling	January 23, 1993	106	22.1
Loren threatens to take the homestead back from Sully.
7	7	"Father's Day"	Jerry London	Sara Davidson	January 30, 1993	104	N/A
Ethan Cooper (Ben Murphy) returns to make amends with his children.
8	8	"Bad Water"	Chuck Bowman	Sara Davidson	February 6, 1993	109	23.8
A wealthy mining baron (Michael Cavanaugh) taints the town's water supply with Mercury, prompting Dr. Mike to force him to clean it up.
9	9	"The Great American Medicine Show"	Richard Heffron	Toni Perling	February 13, 1993	108	23.5
Dr. Mike sets out to discredit a medicine-showman (Robert Culp), who claims to have invented a perfect elixir, when her children's health get put in danger.
10	10	"A Cowboy's Lullaby"	Chuck Bowman	Josef Anderson	February 20, 1993	107	22.0
Red McCall (John Schneider) leaves his sick baby with Dr. Mike and robs Loren's store.
11	11	"Running Ghost"	James Keach	Ed Burnham & Elaine Newman	February 27, 1993	110	22.8
Sully is injured when he tries to stop some men (Don Stroud as the leader) who were hired to kill off the Buffalo.
12	12	"The Prisoner"	Chuck Bowman	Josef Anderson	March 13, 1993	103	23.6
Sully and Dr. Mike come to the aid of a man (Larry Sellers) who General Custer intended to hang.
13	13	"Happy Birthday"	Chuck Bowman	Toni Perling	March 27, 1993	111	23.0
Unmarried Dr. Mike is depressed on her birthday.
14	14	"Rites of Passage"	Chuck Bowman	Sara Davidson	April 10, 1993	112	19.1
Dr. Mike is against the idea of Matthew marrying Ingrid (Jennifer Youngs) and living on his own.
15	15	"Heroes"	Reza Badiyi	Toni Perling	May 1, 1993	113	17.0
Colleen wants Sully to save her.
16	16	"The Operation"	James Keach	Beth Sullivan	May 8, 1993	114	18.1
Brian falls from a tree and sustains a serious head injury.
17	17	"The Secret"	Jerry London	Toni Graphia	May 15, 1993	116	15.7
After Ruby Johnson, a patient, dies, Dr. Mike takes in her son (Joseph Gordon-Levitt), and tries to determine who his father is.
18	18	"Portraits"	Chuck Bowman	Josef Anderson	May 22, 1993	115	18.9
A famous Civil War Photographer with diabetes (Kenny Rogers) realizes he is going blind after he takes a picture.

=== Season 2 (1993–94) ===
No. overall	No. in season	Title	Directed by	Written by	Original release date	Prod. code	US viewers (millions)
19	1	"The Race"	Chuck Bowman	Sara Davidson	September 25, 1993	201	23.0
Dr. Mike disguises herself as a man to enter into a Horse Race.
20	2	"Sanctuary"	Daniel Attias	Josef Anderson	October 2, 1993	203	19.8
Loren's Sister-in-Law Dorothy (Barbara Babcock) comes to town to flee her abusive husband (Wayne Grace), but soon, he is found dead, and she is accused of murder.
21	3	"Halloween"	Chuck Bowman	Toni Graphia	October 30, 1993	207	19.2
The ghost of Sully's deceased wife (Megan Gallivan) pays an unexpected visit on Halloween.
22	4	"The Incident"	Chuck Bowman	Sara Davidson	November 6, 1993	205	22.2
The town is divided over the controversy regarding whether or not Jake killed a Cheyenne.
23	5	"Saving Souls"	James Keach	Toni Perling	November 13, 1993	202	21.5
Dr. Mike and a faith healer (June Carter Cash) clash with each other.
24	6	"Where the Heart Is: Parts 1 & 2"	Chuck Bowman	Beth Sullivan	November 20, 1993	208	27.5
25	7	"Where the Heart Is: Parts 1 & 2"	Chuck Bowman	Beth Sullivan	November 20, 1993	209	27.5
Dr. Mike takes her children to Boston to care for her ailing mother. There, she meets Dr. William Burke (Edward Albert), and is conflicted about staying. Note: Originally aired in a two-hour format.
26	8	"Giving Thanks"	Michele Lee	Toni Perling	November 27, 1993	211	24.0
A drought on Thanksgiving results in the townspeople fighting over water.
27	9	"Best Friends"	James Keach	Sara Davidson	December 4, 1993	210	20.5
On the eve of the Sweethearts Dance, Colleen and Becky have a falling out over a boy (Thomas Ian Nicholas), and Dr. Mike suspects something going on with Sully and Dorothy.
28	10	"Sully's Choice"	Chuck Bowman	Josef Anderson & Sara Davidson & Toni Graphia & Toni Perling	December 11, 1993	227	20.3
Dr. Mike is called away to a flu epidemic in another town, which puts Sully in charge of the children. But he is shot, and Colleen has to treat him.
29	11	"Mike's Dream: A Christmas Tale"	James Keach	Josef Anderson	December 18, 1993	214	21.2
In a tale based on A Christmas Carol, Charlotte Cooper's spirit (Diane Ladd) visits Dr. Mike showing her crucial events of her past, present and future during Christmas.
30	12	"Crossing the Line"	Chuck Bowman	Josef Anderson	January 1, 1994	212	20.6
Matthew steps in to become a scab miner in the wake of a silver miners strike, but gets trapped in a cave.
31	13	"The Offering"	James Keach	Toni Perling	January 8, 1994	206	20.9
To prepare for winter, Dr. Mike advises the army to take the supplies to the Cheyenne Reservationin for the Winter. However, an outbreak Cholera occurs, and Dr. Mike feels responsible for it.
32	14	"The Circus"	Lorraine Senna	Jeanne C. Davis	January 15, 1994	215	24.1
The Circus comes to town, and Matthew befriends the owner and her daughter (Fionnula Flanagan and Lisa Rieffel respectively).
33	15	"Another Woman"	Chuck Bowman	Toni Graphia	January 22, 1994	216	24.4
A woman living with Native Americans being nursed by Dr. Mike (Sheryl Lee) falls for Sully.
34	16	"Orphan Train"	Jerry London	Toni Graphia	January 29, 1994	204	22.8
Rev. Johnson runs an Orphan Train in Colorado Springs, and finds putting the Orphans in appropriate homes harder than he anticipated.
35	17	"Buffalo Soldiers"	James Keach	Kevin Arkadie	February 5, 1994	213	20.3
A troop of buffalo soldiers (led by Dorian Harewood and Spencer Garrett) comes to town and with them the idea that the government was using them instead of white soldiers, because it was felt they were more expendable.
36	18	"Luck of the Draw"	Jerry London	Kathryn Ford	March 5, 1994	217	21.7
Matthew gets hooked on gambling. Rev. Johnson's past catches up to him.
37	19	"Life and Death"	Harry Harris	Toni Perling	March 12, 1994	218	21.4
Dorothy's son (Matt Letscher) returns from war with a problem that many vets came home with.
38	20	"The First Circle"	Chuck Bowman	Toni Graphia	March 26, 1994	221	20.0
Robert E and Grace buy a house in town. A leader of the KKK comes to town and causes trouble among the citizens.
39	21	"Just One Lullaby"	Chuck Bowman	Nancy Bond	April 9, 1994	224	20.1
The town hires a new school teacher (Sherry Hursey).
40	22	"The Abduction: Parts 1 & 2"	Jerry London	Josef Anderson	April 30, 1994	219	22.1
41	23	"The Abduction: Parts 1 & 2"	Jerry London	Josef Anderson	April 30, 1994	220	22.1
Doctor Mike is abducted by Native American Dog Soldiers. Brian tries to help an abused horse. General Custer and the Cavalry cause trouble. With the help of Cloud Dancing and his son, Sully is determined to rescue Dr. Mike.
42	24	"The Campaign"	Victor Lobl	Joanne Parrant	May 7, 1994	222	17.1
The town decides they need a town mayor. Jake Slicker and Dr. Mike are nominated to run against each other.
43	25	"The Man in the Moon"	Rachel Feldman	Toni Graphia	May 14, 1994	223	16.4
After Myra quits working for Hank, he gets drunk and shoots his gun during Myra's engagement party. Sully hits him with a tomahawk. Hank has a severe concussion and falls into a coma. Myra is the only one willing to stay by his side.
44	26	"Return Engagement: Parts 1 & 2"	Gwen Arner	Sara Davidson	May 21, 1994	225	20.0
45	27	"Return Engagement: Parts 1 & 2"	Gwen Arner	Sara Davidson	May 21, 1994	226	20.0
A stranger (Maxwell Caulfield) with close ties to Dr. Quinn comes to town with an agenda of his own. Dr. Mike has a decision to make.

=== Season 3 (1994–95) ===
No. overall	No. in season	Title	Directed by	Written by	Original release date	Prod. code	US viewers (millions)
46	1	"The Train"	Jerry London	Story by : Beth Sullivan & Sara Davidson & Josef Anderson & Toni Graphia; Teleplay by : Toni Graphia & Josef Anderson	September 24, 1994	301	17.3
47	2	"Fathers and Sons"	Jerry Jameson	Josef Anderson	October 1, 1994	302	18.4
48	3	"Cattle Drive: Part 1"	Chuck Bowman	Sara Davidson	October 8, 1994	304	18.0
49	4	"Cattle Drive: Part 2"	Chuck Bowman	Sara Davidson	October 15, 1994	305	17.8
50	5	"The Library"	Victor Lobl	Andrew Lipsitz	October 22, 1994	309	16.8
51	6	"Halloween II"	Jerry London	Toni Graphia	October 29, 1994	308	17.2
52	7	"The Washington Affair: Parts 1 & 2"	Jerry London	Josef Anderson	November 5, 1994	311	19.9
53	8	"The Washington Affair: Parts 1 & 2"	Jerry London	Josef Anderson	November 5, 1994	312	19.9
54	9	"Money Trouble"	Chuck Bowman	Sara Davidson	November 12, 1994	310	16.9
55	10	"Thanksgiving"	Alan J. Levi	Josef Anderson	November 19, 1994	313	17.9
56	11	"Ladies Night: Part 1"	Jerry London	Toni Graphia	November 26, 1994	303	17.7
57	12	"Ladies Night: Part 2"	Jerry London	Toni Graphia	December 3, 1994	399	16.2
58	13	"A First Christmas"	Chuck Bowman	William Schmidt	December 10, 1994	314	16.8
59	14	"Indian Agent"	Jerry Jameson	William Schmidt	January 7, 1995	307	15.2
60	15	"The End of the World"	Victor Lobl	Andrew Lipsitz	January 14, 1995	316	18.0
61	16	"Pike's Peace"	James Keach	Kathryn Ford	January 28, 1995	315	17.8
62	17	"Cooper vs. Quinn: Parts 1 & 2"	Chuck Bowman	Sara Davidson	February 4, 1995	318	20.0
63	18	"Cooper vs. Quinn: Parts 1 & 2"	Chuck Bowman	Sara Davidson	February 4, 1995	319	20.0
64	19	"What Is Love?"	Daniel Attias	Carl Binder	February 11, 1995	320	16.9
65	20	"Things My Father Never Taught Me"	Alan J. Levi	D. Brent Mote	February 18, 1995	317	15.8
66	21	"Baby Outlaws"	Jerry London	Jennifer Tait & Tim Shell	February 25, 1995	321	16.9
67	22	"Bone of Contention"	Victor Lobl	Debbie Smith & Danna Doyle	March 11, 1995	306	15.5
68	23	"Permanence of Change"	Jerry Jameson	Carl Binder	April 8, 1995	325	13.0
69	24	"Washita: Parts 1 & 2"	James Keach	Kathryn Ford & Julie Kirgo	April 29, 1995	322	14.2
70	25	"Washita: Parts 1 & 2"	James Keach	Story by : Kathryn Ford & Julie Kirgo; Teleplay by : Kathryn Ford	April 29, 1995	323	14.2
71	26	"Sully's Recovery"	Jerry Jameson	Sara Davidson	May 6, 1995	328	14.5
72	27	"Ready or Not"	Jerry London	Sara Davidson	May 13, 1995	324	13.5
Note: A flashback clip episode.
73	28	"For Better or Worse: Parts 1 & 2"	Gwen Arner	Beth Sullivan	May 20, 1995	326	19.3
74	29	"For Better or Worse: Parts 1 & 2"	Gwen Arner	Beth Sullivan	May 20, 1995	327	19.3

=== Season 4 (1995–96) ===
No. overall	No. in season	Title	Directed by	Written by	Original release date	Prod. code	US viewers (millions)
75	1	"A New Life"	Jerry London	Carl Binder	September 23, 1995	401	13.3
76	2	"Traveling All-Stars"	Alan J. Levi	Carl Binder & Josef Anderson & Sara Davidson & Toni Graphia & Toni Perling	September 30, 1995	402	13.6
77	3	"Mothers and Daughters"	Bobby Roth	Sara Davidson	October 7, 1995	403	13.6
78	4	"Brothers Keeper"	Jerry London	Story by : Burt Prelutsky; Teleplay by : Burt Prelutsky & Kathryn Ford	October 14, 1995	404	15.9
79	5	"Halloween III"	Jerry London	Philip Gerson	October 28, 1995	407	13.3
80	6	"Dorothy's Book"	Chuck Bowman	Philip Gerson	November 4, 1995	406	14.8
81	7	"Promises, Promises"	Jerry Jameson	Kathryn Ford	November 11, 1995	408	15.7
82	8	"The Expedition: Parts 1 & 2"	Chuck Bowman	Sara Davidson & Andrew Lipsitz	November 18, 1995	409	17.1
83	9	"The Expedition: Parts 1 & 2"	Chuck Bowman	Sara Davidson & Andrew Lipsitz	November 18, 1995	410	17.1
84	10	"One Touch of Nature"	Alan J. Levi	Melissa Rosenberg	November 25, 1995	411	14.6
85	11	"Hell on Wheels"	Alan J. Levi	Andrew Lipsitz	December 9, 1995	405	14.8
86	12	"Fifi's First Christmas"	Jerry Jameson	Carl Binder	December 16, 1995	412	14.3
87	13	"Change of Heart"	James Keach	Julie Henderson	January 6, 1996	413	16.8
88	14	"Tin Star"	Jerry Jameson	Andrew Lipsitz	January 13, 1996	414	15.8
89	15	"If You Love Someone..."	James Keach	Melissa Rosenberg	January 20, 1996	415	17.0
90	16	"The Ice Man Cometh"	Alan J. Levi	Philip Gerson	January 27, 1996	416	16.1
91	17	"Dead or Alive: Part 1"	Chuck Bowman	Carl Binder	February 3, 1996	418	18.7
92	18	"Dead or Alive: Part 2"	Chuck Bowman	Carl Binder	February 10, 1996	419	16.7
93	19	"Deal with the Devil"	Bobby Roth	Nancy Bond	February 17, 1996	417	16.0
94	20	"Eye for an Eye"	Gabrielle Beaumont	Kathryn Ford	February 24, 1996	420	15.2
95	21	"Hearts and Minds"	Terrence O'Hara	Andrew Lipsitz	March 9, 1996	421	14.7
96	22	"Reunion"	Gwen Arner	Melissa Rosenberg	March 23, 1996	422	14.9
97	23	"Woman of the Year"	Gabrielle Beaumont	Paul Stubenrauch	April 6, 1996	423	15.3
98	24	"Last Chance"	Gwen Arner	Carl Binder	April 13, 1996	424	14.0
99	25	"Fear Itself"	Chuck Bowman	Philip Gerson	April 27, 1996	425	14.0
100	26	"One Nation"	Terrence O'Hara	Julie Henderson	May 4, 1996	426	12.4
101	27	"When a Child is Born: Part 1"	James Keach	Carl Binder	May 11, 1996	427	13.8
102	28	"When a Child is Born: Part 2"	James Keach	Carl Binder	May 18, 1996	428	15.6

=== Season 5 (1996–97) ===
No. overall	No. in season	Title	Directed by	Written by	Original release date	Prod. code	US viewers (millions)
103	1	"Runaway Train"	Terrence O'Hara	Philip Gerson	September 21, 1996	501	14.0
104	2	"Having It All"	Bethany Rooney	Sara Davidson	September 28, 1996	502	13.1
105	3	"Malpractice"	Alan J. Levi	Peter Dunne	October 5, 1996	503	13.5
106	4	"All That Glitters..."	Terrence O'Hara	Jennifer Tait	October 12, 1996	504	13.3
107	5	"Los Americanos"	Jerry London	Kathryn Ford	October 19, 1996	506	14.8
108	6	"Last Dance"	Terrence O'Hara	Chris Abbott	October 26, 1996	508	11.7
109	7	"Right or Wrong"	Chuck Bowman	Philip Gerson	November 2, 1996	507	15.0
110	8	"Remember Me"	Alan J. Levi	Steven Baum	November 9, 1996	505	13.5
111	9	"Legend"	Alan J. Levi	Carl Binder	November 16, 1996	509	15.3
112	10	"The Tempest"	Bobby Roth	Eric Tuchman	November 23, 1996	510	14.3
113	11	"Separate But Equal"	Carl Binder	Julie Henderson	December 7, 1996	511	13.6
114	12	"A Place to Die"	Alan J. Levi	Philip Gerson	December 14, 1996	512	13.8
115	13	"Season of Miracles"	Carl Binder	Carl Binder	December 21, 1996	513	13.5
116	14	"The Dam"	Terrence O'Hara	Sara Davidson	January 11, 1997	515	14.61
117	15	"Farewell Appearance"	Chuck Bowman	Robert Hamilton	January 25, 1997	516	13.14
118	16	"The Most Fatal Disease"	James Keach	Chris Abbott	February 1, 1997	514	12.63
119	17	"Colleen's Paper"	Chuck Bowman	Carl Binder	February 8, 1997	517	13.14
120	18	"A House Divided: Parts 1 & 2"	James Keach	Eric Tuchman	February 15, 1997	518	14.14
121	19	"A House Divided: Parts 1 & 2"	James Keach	Eric Tuchman	February 15, 1997	519	14.14
122	20	"Hostage"	Jerry London	Chris Abbott	February 22, 1997	520	13.29
123	21	"The Body Electric"	Gwen Arner	Christine Berardo	April 5, 1997	522	12.28
124	22	"Before the Dawn"	Bethany Rooney	Julie Henderson	April 12, 1997	524	12.92
125	23	"Starting Over"	Gwen Arner	Philip Gerson	April 26, 1997	521	11.61
126	24	"His Father's Son"	James Keach	Chris Abbott	May 3, 1997	523	11.42
127	25	"Moment of Truth: Part 1"	James Keach	Carl Binder	May 10, 1997	525	9.69
128	26	"Moment of Truth: Part 2"	James Keach	Carl Binder	May 17, 1997	526	10.94

=== Season 6 (1997–98) ===
No. overall	No. in season	Title	Directed by	Written by	Original release date	Prod. code	US viewers (millions)
129	1	"Reason to Believe"	Terrence O'Hara	Beth Sullivan, Philip Gerson	September 27, 1997	601	12.94
130	2	"All That Matters"	Bethany Rooney	Beth Sullivan, Carl Binder	October 4, 1997	602	12.58
131	3	"A Matter of Conscience"	Terrence O'Hara	Beth Sullivan, Chris Abbott	October 11, 1997	603	11.22
132	4	"The Comfort of Friends"	Bethany Rooney	Beth Sullivan, Eric Tuchman	October 18, 1997	604	11.92
133	5	"Wave Goodbye"	Roy Campanella II	Beth Sullivan, Robert Hamilton	October 25, 1997	605	11.90
134	6	"A Place Called Home"	Chuck Bowman	Julie Henderson	November 1, 1997	606	12.57
135	7	"Lead Me Not"	Carl Binder	Chris Abbott	November 8, 1997	611	12.51
136	8	"A Time to Heal, Part 1"	Terrence O'Hara	Beth Sullivan	November 15, 1997	607	14.04
137	9	"A Time to Heal, Part 2"	Terrence O'Hara	Beth Sullivan	November 22, 1997	608	13.59
138	10	"Civil Wars"	Jerry London	Philip Gerson	December 6, 1997	609	11.82
139	11	"Safe Passage"	Steve Dubin	Eric Tuchman	December 13, 1997	610	10.95
140	12	"The Homecoming"	James Keach	Carl Binder	December 20, 1997	613	12.34
141	13	"Point Blank"	James Keach	Carl Binder	February 28, 1998	616	13.23
142	14	"Seeds of Doubt"	Gwen Arner	Jeanne C. Davis	March 7, 1998	617	12.30
143	15	"Seven Kinds of Lonely"	Bethany Rooney	Michael Lyons, Kim Wells	March 21, 1998	614	12.47
144	16	"Life in Balance"	Gwen Arner	Chris Abbott	April 4, 1998	618	10.92
145	17	"Happily Ever After"	James Keach	Rick Najera	April 11, 1998	615	10.39
146	18	"Birdman"	Bethany Rooney	Joel Ziskin	April 18, 1998	612	10.61
147	19	"Legend II: Vengeance"	Jerry London	Philip Gerson	April 25, 1998	621	10.51
148	20	"To Have and To Hold"	Gwen Arner	Chris Abbott	May 2, 1998	620	9.05
149	21	"The Fight"	Steve Dubin	Eric Tuchman	May 9, 1998	619	8.71
150	22	"A New Beginning"	James Keach	Carl Binder	May 16, 1998	622	10.15

== Movies ==
=== Dr. Quinn, Medicine Woman: The Movie (1999) ===
Title	Directed by	Written by	Original release date	US viewers (millions)
Dr. Quinn, Medicine Woman: The Movie	James Keach	Josef Anderson & Beth Sullivan	May 22, 1999	12.00

=== Dr. Quinn, Medicine Woman: The Heart Within (2001) ===
Title	Directed by	Written by	Original release date	US viewers (millions)
Dr. Quinn, Medicine Woman: The Heart Within	Jerry London	Beth Sullivan	May 12, 2001	8.83
