= Jessica Bowman =

American actress (born 1980s)

- Born: 1980 or 1981 (age 45–46); Walnut Creek, California, U.S.
- Occupation: Actress
- Years active: 1993–2004, 2011

Jessica Bowman (born 1980 or 1981) is an American actress known for her role as Colleen Cooper on Dr. Quinn, Medicine Woman.

== Career ==
Bowman was born in Walnut Creek, California. She began acting in community theater and commercials, and appeared as Darcy on The Road Home.

After guest appearances on Boy Meets World, NYPD Blue, and Baywatch, Bowman assumed the role of Colleen Cooper on the popular drama Dr Quinn, Medicine Woman in season three, episode 15. She took over this role after the original portrayer, Erika Flores, did not renew her contract. Bowman won the Best Performance by a Young Actress in a Drama Series at the Young Artists Awards in 1996 for her role as Colleen. She was also nominated in 1997 and 1998. She won the Michael Landon Award in 1996, along with Beth Sullivan, Tim Johnson, Chad Allen, and Shawn Toovey, for Outstanding Family Television series of the year. After Dr. Quinn was cancelled in 1998, Bowman starred in Someone to Love Me, playing a rape victim who struggles to prove her rapist's guilt.

Bowman appeared in two made-for-TV movies, Young Hearts Unlimited and Lethal Vows, before reprising her role as Colleen for the movie Dr. Quinn, Medicine Woman: The Heart Within in 2001. She appeared in the movies Joy Ride and Derailed, starring Jean-Claude Van Damme.

== Filmography ==
Year	Title	Role	Notes
1993	Remote	Judy Riley	Video
1994	The Road Home	Darcy Matson	Main role, 6 episodes
1994	Boy Meets World	Jennifer	Episode: "The Uninvited"
1994	NYPD Blue	Allison Davis	Episode: "Simone Says"
1995	Secrets	Anna Berter	TV movie
1995–1998	Dr. Quinn, Medicine Woman	Colleen Cooper	Main role (seasons 3–6), 65 episodes
1997	Baywatch	Kirstie Morgan	Episode: "Rendezvous"
1998	Breakfast with Einstein	Marlena	TV movie
1998	Someone to Love Me	Kaley Young	TV movie
1998	Young Hearts Unlimited	Lissa	TV movie
1999	Lethal Vows	Sarah Farris	TV movie
2001	Dr. Quinn, Medicine Woman: The Heart Within	Colleen Cooper-Cook	TV movie
2001	Joy Ride	Charlotte Dawson	Film
2002	Derailed	Bailey Kristoff	Film
2004	50 First Dates	Tamy	Film
2011	Striker	Michelle Zlatanovic	Short film

== Awards ==
- 1996: Young Artist Award: Best Performance by a Young Actress - TV Drama Series, Dr. Quinn, Medicine Woman
- 1996: Michael Landon Award: Outstanding Family Television Series of the Year, Dr. Quinn, Medicine Woman
