= Jim Knobeloch =

American-Australian actor

- Born: James Joseph Knobeloch; March 18, 1950 (age 76); Belleville, Illinois, U.S.
- Education: Southern Illinois University; Ohio State University
- Occupation: Actor
- Spouse: Beth Sullivan (divorced)
- Children: 2

James Joseph Knobeloch (born March 18, 1950) is an American actor. He is best known for his role as Jake Slicker on the television series Dr. Quinn, Medicine Woman (1993–98). Since 2001, Knobeloch has lived and worked in Australia.

== Early life and education ==
Knobeloch was born in Belleville, Illinois, US. He graduated from Southern Illinois University, earning Bachelors degrees in theater and art, and earned a Masters of Fine Art at Ohio State University.

== Career ==
Knobeloch appeared in several off-Broadway plays, and starred in a touring production of Jesus Christ Superstar. Between 1978 and 1979 he was an actor for “Albee Directs Albee”, a touring series of Edward Albee plays directed by the playwright himself. Knobeloch also co-founded the Mirror Repertory Company, now The Mirror Theater Ltd.

He made his film debut in Michael Cimino’s Western epic Heaven's Gate. He played a recurring guest spot as District Attorney Duncan Watts on the television legal drama The Trials of Rosie O'Neill.

In 1993, he was cast as Jake Slicker on the show Dr. Quinn, Medicine Woman (replacing Colm Meaney from the pilot), and became a principal member of the show for all six seasons.

Since taking up residency in Australia in 2001, he has appeared in a number of Australian films and television series.

He appeared as a studio executive in Peter Jackson’s King Kong, and in 2012 he starred as Dr. Belfort in Predestination He later appeared in the Adult Swim series Smiling Friends.

Knobeloch has appeared in a number of Australian television series including The Saddle Club, Angry Boys and Australia on Trial, a three-part ABC Television series featuring re-enactments of historical events. The episode of Australia on Trial in which Knobeloch appeared centred on the Myall Creek massacre, where he played magistrate Robert Scott. Knobeloch appears as Texan Jim in The BBQ. He plays the role of an American father on the Australian television comedy series Superwog.

== Personal life ==
Knobeloch was formerly married to Beth Sullivan, an American film and television writer and producer, best known as the creator of the long-running CBS series Dr. Quinn, Medicine Woman, in which Knobeloch appeared. They have two children.

Knobeloch has been a permanent resident of Australia since 2001.
