= Derailed (2002 film) =

- Official DVD cover
- Directed by: Bob Misiorowski
- Written by: Jace Anderson; Adam Gierasch
- Story by: Boaz Davidson
- Produced by: Boaz Davidson; Danny Lerner; David Varod
- Starring: Jean-Claude Van Damme; Tomas Arana; Laura Harring; Susan Gibney
- Cinematography: Ross W. Clarkson
- Edited by: Marc Jakubowicz; Fernando Villena
- Music by: Serge Colbert
- Production companies: 777 Films Corp Production; Millennium Films; Nu Image
- Distributed by: Artisan Home Entertainment (United States)
- Release date: October 15, 2002 (U.S.)
- Running time: 89 minutes
- Country: United States
- Language: English
- Budget: $18–20 million
- Box office: $297,835 (Mexico)

Derailed is a 2002 American vigilante action film directed by Bob Misiorowski. It stars Jean-Claude Van Damme, Tomas Arana, Laura Harring, Jessica Bowman, and Van Damme's real life son Kris Van Varenberg. In the story, a secret agent (Van Damme) must escort a thief (Harring)—and the bioweapon she has stolen—from Slovakia to Germany, but the agent's unsuspecting family and a dangerous criminal (Arana) end up on the same train that they are on.

In the United States, Derailed premiered on home video on October 15, 2002, although it was given a theatrical release in some international markets. The film has received negative reviews.

== Plot ==
NATO operative Jacques Kristoff is summoned into action by his superior, General Zakev. His objective is to track down Galina Konstantin, who has stolen an extremely valuable and dangerous container from the Slovak Government, and extract her to Munich by train. Kristoff is given assistance by Lars, who is working with NATO. Jacques is able to locate Galina, reaching her at the same time as a Slovak military unit. After an extended chase, they are able to reach the train and it departs.

Jacques is surprised to discover that his wife, Madeline, and two children, Bailey and Ethan, have boarded the train planning to surprise him for his birthday. However, Madeleine sees Galina and thinks Jacques and her are having an affair. Before storming out of Jacques' cabin, she tells him that she and the kids will get off the train at the next stop.

Meanwhile, the engine compartment is hijacked by two men who take control of the train. They install a cellphone jammer to prevent people from calling authorities. They are working with international criminal Mason Cole, who has also boarded the train. After the train has departed, Cole and his men take control of the train, killing most of the staff, with the exception of the conductor, who hides inside a cabinet after being shot in the leg. Cole orders his henchmen to corral the passengers to the bar room, and demands passenger Galina Konstantin be handed over to him.

Jacques takes out one of his henchmen and runs to the back of the train, where Galina is hiding. Galina reveals the top secret cargo she is carrying is a set of three vials containing a dangerous smallpox strain. Jacques takes the vials, and the two climb on the outside of the train to spy on Cole. However, they are detected and captured by Cole, who takes the vials. A fight ensues. Jacques is presumed to have fallen off the train, but has in fact managed to grab onto an exterior handle. Galina attempts to take the vials back, but one of them breaks, exposing everyone on the train to the virus.

Jacques neutralizes Cole's henchmen in charge of the train's controls. He disables the cell jammer, and puts the real conductor back at the commands. However the brake lines have broken, preventing the train from stopping. Meanwhile Madeline, a doctor by trade, helps comforting the infected passengers, including her own children. Now in possession of the virus, Cole plans to extract from the train via helicopter. But Jacques ambushes him and ties the helicopter's ladder to the train, causing it to crash as the train goes through the tunnel. He also steals the remaining vials back. Now able to place phone calls, Jacques alerts General Zakev of the ongoing crisis. However, he is discovered and escapes by getting off the train with a motorcycle. After consulting with the German railway authority and quarantine specialists, Zakev announces that, should the train come close enough to Germany, they will have to destroy a bridge along its path using thermonuclear missiles.

Jacques climbs back onto the train, and Cole threatens to kill his family if he does not return the vials. He does, but Ethan steals them and flees. Soon after, the convoy gets t-boned by another train, taking the back section clean off and leaving Ethan's fate uncertain. Jacques and the conductor initiate the process of separating the car they are in from the front cars and locomotive. They are ambushed by Cole, who kills the conductor before Jacques kills him.

Jacques and other passengers activate their car's manual brake. As the train gets near the bridge where the troops are massed, Zakev orders the bridge destroyed and the first few cars plunge into the canyon below. However, the rest of the train slows down enough that the passengers—including Ethan who is revealed to be alive—can evacuate before their car falls off. The passengers are put in quarantine under a medical tent, and receive treatment. Jacques accuses Lars to have been an accomplice in the hijacking, and Zakev has the latter arrested. Madeline and Jacques reconcile, while Galina disappears. In the final scene, Galina is shown to have returned to her life of high-stakes burglaries.

== Cast ==
- Jean-Claude Van Damme as Jacques Kristoff
- Tomas Arana as Mason Cole
- Laura Harring as Galina Konstantina
- Susan Gibney as Madeline Kristoff
- Lucy Jenner as Natasha
- Jessica Bowman as Bailey Kristoff
- Kris Van Varenberg as Ethan Kristoff
- John Bishop as Bob Sterling
- Binkey Van Bilderbeek as Angus Riley
- Dayton Callie as Lars
- Simona Williams as Catherine
- Sandra Vidal as Cynthia
- Stefanos Miltsakakis as Stavros
- Jimmy Jean-Louis as Henry
- George Stanchev as William
- Nikolay Binev as Vincent Gruber
- Stanimir Stamatov as Tanner
- Danko Yordanov as Nash
- Trayan Milenov-Troy as Rodrigo
- Emil Tonev as Jasper
- Velizar Peev as Oliver
- Nikolai Sotirov as Lorenzo
- Vasil Banov as General Zakev

== Production ==
=== Development ===
Derailed is the sister film to Air Panic, another Nu Image transportation disaster thriller made shortly before by some of the same personnel, including director Misiorowski, writers Anderson and Gierasch, editor Jacubowicz, composer Colbert and effects men Willie Botha and Ziad Zeirafi. In the run-up to the May 2001 Cannes Film Market, Derailed was promoted as Death Train, and no star was yet officially attached to it. While Van Damme did travel to Cannes to promote his collaboration with Millennium, he focused on the later cancelled The Monk, and seemingly made no mention of Death Train during the press conference. In early October 2001, trade publication The Hollywood Reporter relayed that the film, now named Derailed, was about to enter production with Van Damme and Laura Harring starring, and an estimated $20 million budget. The Death Train title was re-used by Nu Image for a much lower budgeted 2003 film featuring their B contract player Bryan Genesse.

The train's journey in the film, from Bratislava to Munich via Linz, corresponds to the central segment of the route followed by the famed Orient Express in its classic years, although no overt reference is made to that specific property.

Elements of Brazilian jiu jitsu were incorporated into the fight sequences as a way to mix things up for Van Damme's regular audience. Laura Harring took self defence classes to prepare for her role, and credited the film for exposing her to a broader range of physical activities.

=== Filming ===
==== General information ====
Derailed was filmed in and around Sofia, Bulgaria, which stands in for Bratislava, Slovakia, as well as Vienna, Austria in early scenes. Some interiors were shot at the capital's historic Boyana Studios. Principal photography took place between October 20 and December 15, 2001. Background images for certain effects shots were captured earlier during the summer.

The first encounter between Jacques and Galina takes place inside Ivan Vazov National Theatre. The extended car chase that ensues was filmed close by, in the vicinity of the National Academy of Fine Arts. The night shoots caused minor disturbances, and traffic restrictions were placed in the perimeter for nearly a week.

Laura Harring said that she lost her fear of heights during the filming of the wire escape scene. Nonetheless, she was doubled by Leonsia Dokuzova, an internationally touring Bulgarian acrobat, for the most dangerous aerials performed by her character. Van Damme broke his hand during the shoot but finished that day and only took one day off for treatment, forcing the director to film around his swollen hand in several subsequent scenes. Van Damme considered himself to have been in the worst shape of his career on Derailed, as he spent most of his time in his hotel room to follow the latest 9/11 developments.

==== Train sequences ====
The producers were given a choice of two charter trains by the Bulgarian State Railways. The first was built in pre-World War II Germany for the country's Tsar. Sometimes marketed as the "Corona Express", it was lavishly decorated but would not pass as a current passenger train. The other was built in East Germany for the Communist regime that overthrew the monarchy. Colloquially known as the "Government Train", it has also been marketed as the "Vitosha Express". As it was newer and boasted more complete amenities, the latter was chosen. Due to Bulgaria's relatively small railway system, only four miles of tracks located near Aldomirovtsi could be made available to the production, which forced the extensive use of green screen to vary backgrounds. As a result, the main unit only used the train for two days and recreated most of the rail action on a soundstage. The actual train was primarily used by the second unit.

The two trains' t-bone collision, the helicopter's crash into the mountain and the final bridge collapse were shot using train miniatures, while the helicopter, backgrounds and various explosions were added via CGI in post production. Effects sequences used models on the 1:87 and 1:22.5 scales, built under the supervision of South African model maker and Nu Image regular Willie Botha.

=== Post-production ===
==== Visual Effects ====
There were over 420 CGI and optical shots in the film. The CGI, which Misiorowski called "by far the most ambitious" in Millennium's history, were completed in just six weeks. Because of the sheer volume of work required, Millenium's in-house lab, Sofia-based Worldwide FX, partnered with fellow Bulgarian studio Sokerov.

In addition, important sequences were outsourced to American studios. Florida-based Lava Pictures was given the fight atop the train between Van Damme and Arana. The material involving the motorcycle and car carrier was sent to Digital Film Lab in Los Angeles, who were the main VFX shop on Air Panic. Select shots in the above two sequences were completed by THDX, the effects division of Title House Digital (who was in charge of the film's titles and opticals).

==== Editing ====
Derailed employs a particularly busy editing style, which has been cited as one of the reasons for its poor reception. A 2004 article by film scholar Barry Salt mentioned the film as having the shortest average shot length in cinema history at 1.63 second (or 1.53 second in some sources), for which it is still recognized by the Guinness Book of Records as of 2023.

== Release ==
Derailed was screened for film industry professionals during the Cannes Film Market on May 19, 2002.

=== Theatrical ===
Derailed has been released theatrically in a number of international markets. The earliest theatrical release on record was in the Philippines on August 28, 2002. Other theatrical markets include, but are not limited to, Spain, Mexico, and Russia (the latter in a limited release that only briefly preceded the home video).

=== Home media ===
The film arrived on home video in the United States via Artisan Home Entertainment on October 15, 2002, and in the United Kingdom via Columbia TriStar Home Entertainment on August 11, 2003. It was released in France on January 6, 2005.

== Reception ==
Derailed was universally panned by critics and audiences. On the review aggregator website Rotten Tomatoes, 0% of 5 critics' reviews are positive, with an average rating of 2.4/10. The website's consensus reads: "Derailed is one of those familiar and pulpy cautionary tales that depend largely on implausible coincidences and preposterous twists."

The film has invariably been described as one of Jean-Claude Van Damme's worst, and is seen by many as the nadir of his career since his rise to mainstream stardom in the late 1980s.

Bob Misiorowski's directorial choices and the film's special effects have been singled out for particular disdain. David Nusair of DVD Cyber Center and Reel Reviews called the direction "disastrous" and said "The brunt of the blame [...] falls to filmmaker Bob Misiorowski [...] Slow-motion, instant replays, grainy footage [...] his rampant overuse becomes far more distracting than anything else, turning Derailed into an overblown annoyance." Earl Cressey of DVD Talk wrote that while he "went into Derailed with low expectations, the film still managed to disappoint" and was plagued by "a clichéd plot, jerky editing, and some really bad special effects." David Parkinson of the BBC's Radio Times concurred, calling the effects "lamentable". TV Guide was also scathing, commenting that "The title sums up the state of one-time action star Jean-Claude Van Damme's career." Mick Martin and Marsha Porter's DVD and Video Guide assessed that "former action star Jean-Claude Van Damme continues his descent into mediocrity with this badly directed, acted and written action-thriller", giving it a zero out of five.

Retrospective reviews have been equally unkind. Eoin Friel of The Action Elite called Derailed "painful to watch", with "some of the worst visual effects you’ll ever see", and compared it unfavorably to Van Damme's earlier foray into the same genre, Sudden Death.

== Soundtrack ==
The film's score was composed and produced by Serge Colbert. The Balkan Choir contributed vocals, while orchestral parts were performed by the Balkan Symphony Orchestra, under the direction of South African conductor Conrad Van Alphen.

== See also ==
- List of films with a 0% rating on Rotten Tomatoes
