= Ponderosa (TV series) =

Television series

- Genre: Western
- Created by: Beth Sullivan
- Starring: Matthew Carmody; Daniel Hugh Kelly; Drew Powell; Jared Daperis; Brad Dourif; Josephine Byrnes; Fernando Carrillo; Sara Gleeson; Nicky Wendt; Gareth Yuen; Jacqueline Aries; Marcella Toro; Peter Stefanou
- Country of origin: United States
- No. of seasons: 1
- No. of episodes: 20

Production
- Production location: Australia
- Running time: 49 minutes
- Production companies: The Sullivan Company; Associated Television International; Paxson Entertainment

Original release
- Network: PAX TV
- Release: September 9, 2001 – May 12, 2002

Related
- Bonanza

The Ponderosa is a television series developed by Bonanza creator David Dortort for PAX TV that ran for the 2001–2002 television season.

Envisioned as a prequel to the NBC series Bonanza, covering the time when the Cartwrights first arrived at the Ponderosa, when Adam and Hoss were teenagers and Joe a little boy, it had less gunfire, brawling and other traditional western elements than the original.

Bonanza creator David Dortort approved PAX TV's decision to hire Beth Sullivan, creator and executive producer of Dr. Quinn, Medicine Woman, to oversee scripts and executive produce, which some believe gave the series a softer edge.

The Ponderosa was canceled after one season, in part because of disappointing ratings and high production costs. Although Sullivan had hoped to film the series in and around Los Angeles, PAX decided to film in Australia to reduce costs.

The series should not be confused with Ponderosa, the title used for Bonanza reruns aired on NBC in mid-1972.

== Premise ==
Territory of Nevada, year 1849: ten years before the original Bonanza starts, the Cartwright family moves onto some scrub land. In this new land Ben Cartwright, a new widower, tries to raise his three young sons – at their late teens Adam and Hoss, and a pre-teen Joseph, commonly known as Little Joe.

== Cast ==
=== Main ===
- Matt Carmody as Adam Cartwright
- Daniel Hugh Kelly as Ben Cartwright
- Drew Powell as Hoss Cartwright
- Jared Daperis as Little Joe Cartwright

=== Recurring ===
- Brad Dourif as Frenchy
- Josephine Byrnes as Margaret Green
- Fernando Carrillo as Carlos Rivera de Vega
- Sara Gleeson as Tess Greene
- Nicky Wendt as Shelby Sterritt
- Gareth Yuen as Hop Sing
- Marcella Toro (episodes 6–7) and Jaqueline Aries (episodes 10–16) as Isabella Maria Rivera de Vega
- Peter Stefanou as Jorge
- Jessica Gower as Judith

=== Guests ===
- Christopher Kirby as Samuel Newborn
- Eddie Baroo as Virgil / Smitty
- Eliza Szonert as Myra
- Lewis Fitz-Gerald as Henry Stewart
- Peter Curtin

== Episodes ==
No.	Title	Directed by	Written by	Original release date
1	"Pilot"	Simon Wincer	Beth Sullivan	September 9, 2001
2	"Pilot"	Simon Wincer	Beth Sullivan	September 9, 2001
Ben Cartwright moves his family to Lake Tahoe, seeking to open a cattle ranch. However, trouble arises when a mining prospector seeks to claim the same property as Cartwright. After his third wife is murdered by the prospector, Ben seeks an end to the developing feud. At the same time, Little Joe decides to take matters into his own hands and goes after the killer. At the same time, Ben hires Carlos and Hop Sing to work at his ranch.
3	"Joaquin"	Mark Piper	Kathyrn Ford	September 16, 2001
Hoss and Little Joe are in for a shock when an accused gunman known as "Joaquin" is rumored to be in town. Joaquin is a well known outlaw who teaches Adam how to shoot a pistol, something that his father refuses him to have.
4	"Bare Knuckles"	Kevin James Dobson	Joe Viola	September 23, 2001
Hoss decides to challenge "Iron Hands" Malloy, a renowned fighter, to a boxing match. However, Adam does some digging and finds that this particular fighter is known for his cheating...
5	"The Promise"	Kevin James Dobson	Robert Hamilton	September 30, 2001
After Adam shoots and kills a robber, he makes a promise to watch out for the man's family. At the same time, a former slave named Samuel Washington, but who in reality is Samuel Newborn, shows up in town peddling items that he claims are passed down from George Washington's mansion.
6	"Homeland"	Kevin James Dobson	Jeanne C. Davis	October 14, 2001
Carlos is reunited with his long-lost sister Isabella whom he had been separated from during the Mexican–American War. Destitute and homeless, Ben agrees to take her in, but when a sheriff enters town on the trail of a killer things become complex as Isabella's horse once belonged to the murdered man.
7	"Quarantine"	Kevin James Dobson	Joe Viola	October 28, 2001
A deadly illness afflicts the area, putting the town under a quarantine.
8	"Secrets and Lies"	Chris Langman	Kathryn Ford	November 4, 2001
An author whose adopted son lived through Donner Party seeks out Adam, of all people, to write the "true story" of what happened. At the same time, Ben does some soul-searching in regards to past mistakes while secrets hidden by Margaret and Shelby are revealed.
9	"The Legend of John Riley"	Kevin James Dobson	Rick Najera	November 18, 2001
When a known traitor who fought for Mexico against his country of birth, one John Riley, takes up residence at the Ponderosa, a wedge is driven between members of the Cartwright family and their friends. Particularly upset is Tess, who opposes the man because her own father was killed in the Mexican–American War.
10	"Brother Against Brother"	Lewis Fitz-Gerald	Jennifer Tait	December 2, 2001
A dance is being held in town and everyone is trying to find the perfect date. Tess tries to woo Adam, but is too late when Isabella asks him first. Margaret and Shelby also get in on the fun, both battling for Ben's affections.
11	"Where the Heart Is"	Paul Faint	Jeanne C. Davis	December 16, 2001
Ben's sister-in-law comes to town with the intention of taking Little Joe back to New Orleans, determined to fulfill a promise she made to her sister before the Cartwrights moved to Nevada.
12	"Treasure"	Kevin James Dobson	Jennifer Tait	January 6, 2002
Adam, Carlos, and Hoss find a treasure map in the hands of a dead man. The three decide to follow it to the riches apparently hidden by the man, but, as one would expect, they are being followed by others who know about the map.
13	"Spoils of War"	Declan Eames	Kathryn Ford	January 13, 2002
A former friend of Carlos's named Manuel comes to Ponderosa. He reacts with shock and disgust at Carlos's employment with the Cartwrights as it was the Americans who defeated their people in the Mexican–American War. At the same time, he sets into motion a plan to retake the land around Lake Tahoe. It is the last episode with Carlos as he is killed by a robber that is working with Manuel.
14	"A Time to Win"	Declan Eames	Beth Sullivan	January 20, 2002
An entrepreneur comes to town, builds a new hotel, and seeks to expand the town's market, but what is he really after?
15	"Blind Faith"	Chris Thomson	Ron Green	February 10, 2002
A rainmaker with a beautiful daughter named Judith comes to town. Hoss immediately falls for her, but can the good reverend really perform miracles?
16	"Lesser of Two Evils"	Declan Eames	Joe Viola	February 17, 2002
Isabella's childhood sweetheart, long thought dead, arrives at the Ponderosa and wants to pick up where they left off. Isabella is torn between doing just that or trying to continue her blossoming relationship with Adam.
17	"Comes a Horse"	Unknown	Unknown	March 24, 2002
An illness sweeps through the cattle all around Lake Tahoe, leading to calls to destroy all the livestock.
18	"Grown Ups"	Unknown	Unknown	April 28, 2002
Hoss and Tess discover an abandoned baby and consider marrying in order to raise the child together.
19	"Samson and Hercules"	Unknown	Unknown	May 5, 2002
Hoss sets out to end wolf fights that are being held in town as a gambling event.
20	"Fugitive"	Unknown	Unknown	May 12, 2002
Sam Newborn returns on the run after a new law states that escaped slaves in any territory must be captured and returned to their owners.

== Home release ==
Shortly after the series first aired, four episodes were released on two DVDs. The first DVD featured both parts of the pilot episode, while the second featured "Brother vs. Brother" and "Treasure".

On May 25, 2004, The Ponderosa: Season 1: Volume 1 was released. This set collects the first ten episodes of the series. No plans have been announced yet to release the last ten episodes of the series on DVD.

== Continuity ==
A number of minor (or perceived) inconsistencies exist between Ponderosa and Bonanza, and a few glaring retcons are present.

- Most notable among these is the fate of Little Joe's mother. In the original series, her death was depicted in the episode "Marie, My Love" (4x20) as a result of falling off a horse in front of the Ponderosa ranch house. In the new series, she is killed in Virginia City by a miner who is trying to murder Eli Orowitz. Making the situation even more confusing, the pilot for the original series identifies Little Joe's mother as Felicia and not Marie as in the original.
- The Hop Sing character is depicted not only as a cook, but also a family counselor and herbal healer.
