= Chuck Bowman =

American filmmaker (born 1937)

- Born: Charles W. Bowman; June 2, 1937 (age 89); Coffeyville, Kansas, U.S.
- Occupations: Actor; director; producer; writer
- Years active: 1969–present
- Spouse: Lisa
- Children: Rob

Charles W. Bowman (born June 2, 1937) is an American actor, director, producer and writer of film and television.

== Career ==
Bowman's career has spanned over forty years working in television directing episodes of The Incredible Hulk, The Greatest American Hero, The A-Team, T. J. Hooker, MacGyver, In the Heat of the Night, They Came from Outer Space, Murder, She Wrote, Swamp Thing: The Series, Touched by an Angel, Dr. Quinn, Medicine Woman, The Pretender, Walker Texas Ranger and Castle as well as number of television and theatrical feature films, including the Stephen J. Cannell production of The Tooth Fairy.

As an actor, he appeared numerous times on Dragnet and Adam-12, playing a different character in each episode as well as appearing in episodes of The Rockford Files, Hardcastle and McCormick and most recently Day Break.

== Personal life ==
He is the father of film and television director Rob Bowman. He lives in Los Angeles with his wife Lisa.

He is an alum of Los Angeles City College.

== Filmography ==
Year	Title	Role	Notes
1970	Airport	New York Dispatcher	Uncredited

1970 Dragnet Newspaper reporter. S. P. M.
