= Loose Change (book) =

1977 book by Sara Davidson

First edition

Loose Change (Doubleday: Garden City) is a non-fiction biography from 1977 by the American author Sara Davidson. The book follows the changing fortunes, lives, friendships, attitudes and characters of three women, beginning with their meeting as freshmen at the University of California, Berkeley in the 1960s. Sara (Davidson), Susie, and Tasha experience the radical changes that went through American culture in that era, observing or being involved in student protests, drug use, the Civil Rights Movement, the 1968 Chicago Democratic Convention, communes, free sex, and the popular music of the times. Over the course of the book, they become closer and then diverge in their viewpoints and propinquity.

== Television miniseries and NBC technical error ==
A three-part NBC television miniseries, also called Loose Change, was televised February 26 to 28, 1978. Season Hubley and Cristina Raines starred.

When the miniseries was originally televised, NBC broadcast the third part accidentally on February 27 to its East Coast affiliates due to technical difficulties; after 16 minutes of the third part being played, the error was discovered and the network aired the second part, in its entirety. (In the next scheduled episode of Saturday Night Live on March 11, John Belushi referred to the foul-up during the opening monologue.) In a separate incident, NBC affiliate KUTV in Salt Lake City, Utah, censored part of the first part of the miniseries by removing three minutes. This caused issues in Boise, Idaho, because at the time all NBC programming to Idaho and Montana was routed through Salt Lake City; the general manager of KTVB was irked that KUTV was able to dictate what was or was not seen on his station.

The miniseries was re-edited and cut down to four hours (from the original six) and re-broadcast as Those Restless Years July 8 and 15, 1979.
