= Toni Graphia =

American television writer and producer (born 1960)

- Born: May 11, 1960 (age 66); Baton Rouge, Louisiana
- Education: Louisiana State University (attended); University of California, Santa Barbara (B.A.)
- Occupations: Television producer and writer
- Years active: 1989–present
- Television: China Beach, Dr. Quinn, Medicine Woman, Battlestar Galactica

Toni Graphia (born May 11, 1960) is an American writer and television producer.

== Early life and education ==
Graphia was raised in Baton Rouge, Louisiana, the daughter of Anthony J. "Tony" Graphia, a prominent judge and current chairman of the Louisiana Board of Tax Appeals. She attended Woodlawn High School before going to college.

Graphia attended Louisiana State University for two years as an English major before moving west. She enrolled at the University of California, Santa Barbara and graduated with a B.A. in communications. She also studied journalism at Santa Barbara City College.

== Career ==
Graphia got her start as part of a Writers Guild of America apprenticeship program where she "went from opening fan mail to selling scripts in just a few years..." Her first work was as a researcher on the television series China Beach, where she met co-creator John Sacret Young, and was promoted into a screenwriting role. The two worked on additional projects together, including Quantum Leap, Cop Rock, and Dr. Quinn, Medicine Woman.

Through her history with Young, Graphia created, produced, and wrote Orleans with him, which aired in 1997. The show was based on Graphia's family and life growing up in New Orleans, with the character Judge Luther Charbonnet, played by Larry Hagman, modeled after her father. Hagman was the first actor that Graphia thought about after creating the role of Charbonnet.

Subsequent projects saw her produce and/or write for Roswell, Carnivàle, Battlestar Galactica, Terminator: The Sarah Connor Chronicles, Mercy, Alcatraz, Grey's Anatomy, and Outlander.

== Awards and honors ==
Graphia's work as screenwriter and producer was cited when R&D TV, in association with NBC Universal Television Studios, won the 2005 Peabody Award for the 2005 season of Battlestar Galactica, noting "plotlines that are deeply personal and relatable, while never compromising their affinity and passion for science fiction."

== Personal life ==
Graphia is based out of Los Angeles, and she has been openly lesbian since February 2006 after coming out in a "public way" at a Writers Guild of America panel.

Graphia has taught classes at her alma mater, the University of California, Santa Barbara as well as at the University of Southern California, University of California, Los Angeles, and Emerson College.
