= Cai Emmons =

Caroline “Cai” Eddy Emmons
- Born: January 15, 1951
- Died: January 2, 2023 (aged 71)
- Education: Yale University, BA; New York University Tisch School of the Arts, MFA film (Thesis film won Student Academy Award); University of Oregon, MFA fiction
- Occupations: novelist, dramatist/playwright, screenwriter, teacher
- Spouse: married
- Children: 1

Cai Emmons (1951 – 2023) was an award-winning American author, playwright, and teacher. Emmons died on January 2, 2023, at the age of 71 years old. The cause of death was ruled ALS.

Emmons writing was known for creative exploration of environmental concerns and reactions to them, magical realism, female agency, and emotional responses to loss.

== Education and Career ==
Emmons was born in Boston, Massachusetts, to Judith Reed Emmons and A. Bradlee Emmons. The second of three daughters, she treasured family closeness and fun.

While a student at Lincoln-Sudbury High School, Emmons spent an academic year in school in Cheshire, England. Emmons attended Yale University as one of the first women to enroll at Yale College. Her interest in drama was evident when she was a teenager, and she majored in psychology and drama at Yale. She then studied film at the Tisch School of the Arts at New York University, where she won a Student Academy Award for her film, "A Man Around the House."

Teaching was a major part of Emmon's life for many years. She started as a teacher at Hammonasset School in Madison, Connecticut, and taught creative writing and film at several schools.

== Books ==
- His Mother’s Son (Harcourt, 2003) Oregon Book Award: Ken Kesey Award for the Novel, Booksense and Literary Guild selection
- The Stylist (HarperCollins, 2007)
- Weather Woman (Red Hen Press, 2018) Nautilus Book Award, shortlisted for the Eric Hoffer Grand Prize
- Vanishing: Five Stories (Leapfrog Press, 2020) Winner of the 2019 Leapfrog Global Fiction Prize
- Sinking Islands (Red Hen Press, 2021) May Sarton Award, Montaigne Award Finalist, [sequel to Weather Woman]
- Unleashed (Dutton, 2022)
- Livid (Red Hen Press, 2022)
- The Bells (Red Hen Press, 2025)

== Plays ==
“Mergatroid” and “When Petulia Comes,” teleplays for the CBS series The Trials of Rosie O’Neill.

== Personal life ==
Emmons moved to the West Coast in 1991, working in the film industry in San Clemente, California until 1996. She moved to Oregon and earned a master's degree in fiction at the University of Oregon. She focused on writing and teaching at the University of Oregon until 2018.

In 2021, Emmons received a diagnosis that explained troubling physical symptoms she had been experiencing: Bulbar-onset ALS (Amyotrophic Lateral Sclerosis, also known as Lou Gehrig's Disease). Bulbar ALS, a neuromuscular disease, first attacks muscles of the head and neck, including vocal cords.

She continued to write, sending her final manuscript for a novel (The Bells) to the publisher on the day she died. The book was released in October 2025.

Just days before she died, Emmons' blog post reflected on being on the prospect of impending death: "What is a life, after all? It is not a novel. It is not an artifact. It is an energetic enterprise in which atoms cohere for a while before the organism they have been part of dies and decomposes, and the atoms take their energy elsewhere."

When her condition deteriorated significantly, she determined to pursue the option allowed under Oregon law known as Death with Dignity.

== Legacy ==
Cai Emmons Short Fiction Contest, established in 2025, recognizes writers from Oregon and Washington whose work carries themes found in Cai Emmons’s work, including interconnectedness, grief and loss, family dynamics, environmental/climate concerns, magical realism, and women’s experiences and identities.

Cai Emmons Fiction Award, Red Hen Press. To honor the life and legacy of novelist Cai Emmons

Vanishing: A Love Story, Award-winning documentary feature-length film, Ojeda Films, 2025. Sandra Luckow, Director; Sandra Luckow, Kat Vecchio, Producers; Sheila Nevins and Paul Calandrino, Executive Producers; Quentin Chiappetta, Composer.
