= Michaela Quinn =

Fictional character

- Jane Seymour as Michaela Quinn
- First appearance: "Dr. Quinn, Medicine Woman"
- Last appearance: The Heart Within
- Created by: Beth Sullivan
- Portrayed by: Jane Seymour

In-universe information
- Nicknames: Dr Mike; Mike
- Gender: Female
- Title: Doctor
- Occupation: Physician
- Spouse: Byron Sully
- Children: Katherine Elizabeth "Katie" Sully; Matthew Cooper (adopted); Colleen Cooper-Cook (adopted); Brian Cooper (adopted)

Michaela Anne "Dr. Mike" Quinn, M.D. is a fictional character from the American television show Dr. Quinn, Medicine Woman. CBS introduced the series in 1993, and Dr. Quinn was played by Jane Seymour. The series ran for six seasons, ending in 1998. Seymour reprised the role in two made for TV movies, Dr. Quinn: Revolutions (1999) and Dr. Quinn: The Heart Within (2001), following the series cancellation. Dr. Quinn, again played by Seymour, also made an appearance in California (1997), an unaired TV pilot for a spinoff of Dr. Quinn: Medicine Woman made by CBS.

Jane Seymour's portrayal of Dr. Michaela Quinn has been widely viewed as an iconic western character, earning Seymour a Golden Globe award.

== Background ==
Michaela Quinn was born into a wealthy family in Boston (15/02/1833). With the encouragement of Josef Quinn, her father and a doctor in his own right, she attends the Woman's Medical College of Pennsylvania and becomes licensed herself. Unable to find respect as a female physician in a practice of her own, she works with her father in his clinic until his death. Once again faced with discrimination as an independent, female doctor, she pursues employment outside of Boston. After being mistaken for "Michael A. Quinn", (a man) she is offered a job via telegraph in the Colorado Territory. Upon her arrival, the townsfolk discover the error and attempt to withdraw the offer of employment. Michaela insists, however, that she is up to the challenge, and she is reluctantly offered the job as town doctor in Colorado Springs, Colorado.

There she starts her own medical clinic in the town, in lieu of being employed by the town directly, giving her autonomy in her medical practice. She also begins actively trying to change the townfolks attitudes toward modern medicine, the Cheyenne and other Native American peoples, and a host of other, more progressive attitudes not entirely shared by the frontier-minded residents. She adopts three children after her friend and their mother, Charlotte Cooper, was bitten by a rattlesnake and succumbs to the venom.

Quinn is a very independent woman who often clashes with the townsfolk, but more often than not she is successful in changing or at the least softening their attitudes. Soon after her arrival she falls in love with a man named Byron Sully, played by Joe Lando, who is very interested in Native culture and spends most of his time with the Native.

Her mother is devastated that her daughter has decided to leave and live in Colorado Springs, but after a visit she changes her mind and to a certain extent accepts Michaela's decision. Later, her mother again travels to Colorado to attend her wedding, giving her blessing for Michaela to marry Sully. The elder Mrs. Quinn warms to the family, even sending young Brian a poodle after his pet wolf, Pup, is killed by rabies. Her mother, Elizabeth, travels to Colorado Springs a third time, with Michaela's sisters in tow, to witness the birth of her daughter, Katherine Elizabeth Sully, who they nickname Katie.

== Social issues ==
Dr. Mike often used her position as a doctor and care giver to seize the moral high ground and challenge the townspeople on their often narrow, conservative views of the time. Some examples include:

=== Racism, anti-semitism and other bigotry ===
After regular series characters, blacksmith Robert E. (portrayed by Henry G. Sanders) and his restaurateur wife, Grace, (Jonelle Allen) a freed-slave couple, buy a home in downtown Colorado Springs, they are immediately challenged by the banker, Jebediah Bancroft (portrayed by George Furth, Season 2, Episode 19, "The First Circle"). Bancroft responds to the sale of a prominent home in the town to a black couple by forming a local Ku Klux Klan chapter, for which it is revealed that Bancroft is a grand wizard. The townsfolk are tricked into joining, since they were only told they were joining a men's club. However, it soon becomes clear what Bancroft's true intentions are, and Quinn intervenes as some members of the town are about to hang Robert E. Chastising them for their racism while wearing their "ridiculous costumes", she pulls the hood off of Bancroft, exposing him undeniably as their leader. Shamed as a violent racist and trouble maker, Bancroft is never seen in Colorado Springs again.

Michaela Quinn and her family also warmly befriend the local Cheyenne people, including Chief Black Kettle (played by Nick Ramus), and his right-hand man, Cloud Dancing (Larry Sellers). Dr. Quinn and her adopted family, followed shortly after by Sully, travel to Washington D.C. (Season 3, Episodes 7 and 8, "The Washington Affair", Part 1 and 2) to lobby the government on behalf of the Cheyenne. They meet with Congressional leaders, testify before hearings and even meet with President Ulysses S. Grant (Dennis Lipscomb). They are given mostly platitudes and empty promises, although Grant seems the most accommodating. After a fictional portrayal of the real-life Battle of Washita River (Season 3, Episodes 24 and 25, "Washita"), in which Black Kettle and most of his clan are killed, Quinn has an emotional break down. Cloud Dancing is not at Washita, and therefore survives, although his wife is killed. Cloud Dancing remains a close friend of the Sully/Quinn family throughout the series.

Dr. Quinn also fights for the rights of Chinese immigrants, a Jewish salesman who visits the town, and other racial and religious minorities.

=== Censorship ===
The issue of censorship is dealt with on the series when Michaela Quinn's mother sends her late father's extensive book collection to Colorado Springs. Rather than keep them for herself, Dr. Quinn convinces the town to open a public library, which is named the Josef Quinn Memorial Library. Trouble soon brews, however, when the town realizes that many of the titles' subject matter stray from their traditionally conservative, Christian beliefs. Events escalate until an attempted book burning ensues. Stopped by Dr. Mike, Sully and the children, the town realizes they have gone too far and help restore the books. (Season 3, Episode 5, "The Library")

=== Evolution ===
While espousing a genuine belief in God along with most of the town, Dr. Quinn nonetheless differs with most of the town on Darwinism.
