= Sara Davidson =

American novelist

- Born: 1943 (age 82–83); United States
- Education: University of California, Berkeley
- Occupations: Novelist, journalist, producer
- Writing career
- Notable work: Loose Change
- Website: saradavidson.com

Sara Davidson (born 1943) is an American journalist, novelist, and screenwriter. She is the author of the best-selling Loose Change. It was adapted as a television mini-series. In addition, she has written other series and served as producer.

== Early life and education ==
Davidson grew up in California and graduated from Los Angeles High School in 1960. She graduated from the University of California, Berkeley. She also attended the Columbia University Graduate School of Journalism and started her writing career as a journalist.

== Journalist ==
Davidson's first job was as a reporter with the Boston Globe. She has also written for magazines including The Atlantic Monthly, Esquire, Harper's Magazine, Life, McCall's, Ms., The New York Times Magazine, Newsweek, O, The Oprah Magazine, Ramparts and Rolling Stone.

== Personal ==
In 1968, she was briefly married to Jonathan Schwartz, a popular-music radio deejay in New York City. She later married again, to a Los Angeles businessman. They had a son and a daughter together, but were divorced.

In the 1990s she had an affair with "real-life cowboy" Richard Goff. Their relationship inspired her largely autobiographical novel Cowboy(1999).

== Books ==
- 1977 Loose Change: three women of the sixties, This was adapted as a television mini-series airing in 1978.
- 1980 Real Property
- 1984 Friends of the Opposite Sex, ISBN 0-385-13381-2
- 1986 Rock Hudson: his Story, written with Rock Hudson, ISBN 0-688-06472-8
- 1999 Cowboy, ISBN 0-06-019326-3
- 2007 Leap!: What Will We Do with the Rest of Our Lives?, ISBN 978-0-345-47808-5
- 2012 Joan: Forty Years of Life, Loss, and Friendship with Joan Didion, ISBN 978-1-61452-016-0
- 2014 The December Project: An Extraordinary Rabbi and a Skeptical Seeker Confront Life's Greatest Mystery.
- 2023 The Didion Files: Fifty Years of Friendship with Joan Didion

== Television ==
Davidson's novel Loose Change (1977) was adapted for a mini-series. In addition, she wrote and produced a number of television series. She created the series Jack and Mike (1986), and HeartBeat (1988). She was the co-executive producer for Dr. Quinn, Medicine Woman.
