= Remote (1993 film) =

- Directed by: Ted Nicolaou
- Written by: Mike Farrow
- Produced by: Albert Band
- Starring: Chris Carrera; Jessica Bowman; John Diehl
- Music by: Richard Band
- Production company: Moonbeam Entertainment
- Distributed by: Paramount Pictures
- Release date: September 22, 1993
- Running time: 80 min
- Country: United States
- Language: English

Remote is a 1993 American comedy film that was released directly to video on September 22, 1993, by Paramount Pictures through Moonbeam Entertainment. It stars Chris Carrara, Jessica Bowman, and John Diehl. Ted Nicolaou directed the films and it was written by Mike Farrow, best known for his hard-boiled detective persona Tommy Sledge. It is the second film to be released by Moonbeam Entertainment, following Prehysteria! (1993). It follows a tech teenager (Carrara) who uses multiple remote controls on different models when he face off against the three burglars who robbed at a modeled home.

== Plot ==
Randy Mason (Chris Carrara) is a teenage technology enthusiast who lives in a suburban neighborhood in California with his mother, Marti (Derya Ruggles), a designer for an advertising agency. His father, Brent, is away on a business trip for the duration of the story. Randy’s primary hobby involves building and operating remote-controlled models, which he frequently modifies for creative and unconventional purposes. His collection includes a helicopter named Huey, a biplane, a World War II fighter plane called Zero, red and blue racecars, a green monster truck, a Godzilla-like figure, and a yodeling mountain climber named Gunther. He shares this interest with his close friend and romantic interest, Judy Riley (Jessica Bowman), a baseball player. Randy also introduces Judy to a nearby model home, which he uses as a secret hideout.

One day, Randy plays a prank on his neighbor Ben (Jordan Belfi), a local bully, by interfering with his television using a remote device and dropping an empty soda can on his head with the helicopter. In retaliation, Ben steals Randy’s Zero plane. Although reluctant, Randy allows him to keep it temporarily but explains that the controller is locked with his other devices at home. Ben insists Randy bring it to school the next day. At school, Randy attempts to regain control of the plane using his own controller, resulting in a midair struggle between the two devices. The plane crashes into a classroom, causing chaos and destroying a science project belonging to Randy’s friend Jamaal (Kenneth A. Brown). As no one witnesses Ben’s involvement, Randy is blamed and subsequently expelled.

Upon returning home, Randy hears a message from his distressed mother stating she intends to confiscate all his models. Fearing punishment, Randy hides his equipment in the model home. Judy encourages him to tell the truth about Ben, but Randy declines, feeling partially responsible and unwilling to escalate the conflict. Despite his situation, he promises to attend Judy’s baseball game later that evening.

While heading out, Randy encounters three criminals—Delbert “Del” McCoy (John Diehl), Louis (Tony Longo), and Richie Marinelli (Stuart Fratkin)—who have just committed a convenience store robbery but accidentally left the stolen money behind. Seeking refuge from police roadblocks, they break into the model home to hide for several days. Randy, unaware of their presence, sneaks inside but becomes trapped in the attic when the criminals remove the ladder. The burglars avoid triggering the house’s alarm system by carefully placing objects over sensor pads.

From the attic, Randy attempts to alert others using his remote-controlled devices. He tries to send a message via his helicopter to a passing real estate agent, Mrs. Williams (Lorna Scott), but fails to get her attention. He also uses Gunther in attempts to sabotage the burglars, including placing a tack in Richie’s shoe and trying to steal Del’s gun, though the latter proves too heavy. When hungry, Randy manages to steal food using his devices, inadvertently causing confusion among the criminals.

Meanwhile, Judy grows concerned when Randy fails to appear at her game and leaves a message at his house. Marti, unaware of Randy’s whereabouts, contacts the police. During a conversation with Ben and his mother, Dee, Ben inadvertently reveals suspicious knowledge, prompting Dee to confront him. That night, Randy unsuccessfully attempts to escape the attic and eventually falls asleep, as do the burglars. Marti waits anxiously at home, while Judy remains unaware of the situation until the next morning.

After hearing Marti’s message, Judy sets out to find Randy and arrives at the model home. The criminals capture her, prompting Randy to take action. Using his remote-controlled devices, he orchestrates a series of attacks to thwart the burglars. He uses the Godzilla figure to dump hot roofing tar on Louis, triggering the alarm when Louis falls onto the sensor pads. Randy then directs the helicopter to lead Mrs. Williams’ dog, Bluto, toward Richie, and uses the plane to entangle him in a flag line.

Randy ultimately disarms Del with Gunther’s help, and Judy throws the gun out of reach. As Del advances, Randy uses the racecars as improvised roller skates to destabilize him, leading to his defeat. The police arrive shortly thereafter and arrest the criminals.

Randy is reunited with his mother and friends, and the situation is resolved. In the aftermath, Randy and Judy agree to find a new hideout. The story concludes with Randy retrieving Gunther from the roof, signaling a return to normalcy.

== Cast ==
- Chris Carrera as Randy Mason
- Jessica Bowman as Judy Riley
- John Diehl as Delbert McCoy
- Tony Longo as Louis Marinelli
- Stuart Fratkin as Richie Marinelli
- Derya Ruggles as Marti Mason
- Jordan Belfi as Ben
- Kenneth A. Brown as Jamaal
- Lorna Scott as Mrs. Eva McKinley Williams
- Michael Keys Hall as Jim
- Robin Westphal as Dee
- Bobbie Chandler as Wendy Riley (credited as Bobbie Candler)
- John Rubinow as Brent Mason
- Reno Goodale as Mr. Fenderman
- Geoff Witcher as Wally White, Newscaster
- Milo as Brother Milo, Televangelist (credited as Milo Needles)
- Leigh Shanta as Televangelist's Mistress

== DVD release ==
The film is currently available for online viewing on Full Moon Features and Tubi. It was released on Blu-ray by Full Moon Features on February 8, 2022.
