= Orleans (TV series) =

American drama television series

- Genre: Drama
- Created by: Toni Graphia; John Sacret Young
- Written by: Linda Bergman; Toni Graphia; Jim Miller; Pam Veasey; John Sacret Young
- Directed by: Steve Dubin; Jan Egleson; Fred Gerber; Scott Paulin; Pat Quinn; John Sacret Young
- Starring: Larry Hagman; Michael Reilly Burke; Vanessa Bell Calloway
- Composer: David Langley Hamilton
- Country of origin: United States
- Original language: English
- No. of seasons: 1
- No. of episodes: 8

Production
- Executive producer: John Sacret Young
- Producer: Colleen McCormick
- Running time: 60 minutes (with commercials)
- Production companies: Samoset Productions; Paramount Network Television

Original release
- Network: CBS
- Release: January 7 – April 11, 1997

Orleans is an American drama television series created by Toni Graphia and John Sacret Young, that aired on CBS from January 7 through April 10, 1997. It ran for 8 episodes. The series was said to be inspired by the experiences of creator/producer Toni Graphia, who was the daughter of a Louisiana judge.

== Synopsis ==
The show was centered on the character of Judge Luther Charbonnet, portrayed by Larry Hagman. He was a judge seated in New Orleans and had a family that consisted of some wildly different characters. One of the sons was an assistant district attorney, another son was a police officer, and a daughter who ran a casino. An overall backstory to the series was that Judge Luther had another daughter who was missing or had been dead for years, and he had a search going on for information on her. Several "taboo" subjects were touched on this series, including interracial relationships (Judge Luther had a black girlfriend) and incest (the daughter had a relationship with her cousin).

The show was promoted heavily before it had aired in early 1997 However, the ratings were not great, and it was quickly moved to Friday nights in the same slot Hagman's previous series Dallas dominated for CBS. This would not be the case with Orleans and the series was cancelled at the end of its 1st season.

== Cast ==
- Larry Hagman as Judge Luther Charbonnet
- Michael Reilly Burke as Jesse Charbonnet
- Vanessa Bell Calloway as Rosalee Clark
- Brett Cullen as Clade Charbonnet
- Colleen Flynn as Paulette Charbonnet
- Lynette Walden as Rene Doucette
- O'Neal Compton as Curtis Manzant
- Charles Durning as Frank Vitelli
- Richard Fancy as Vincent Carraze
- Jerry Hardin as Leon Gillenwater
- Melora Hardin as Gina Vitelli
- Cotter Smith as Bill Brennecke

== Episodes ==
| No. | Title | Directed by | Written by | Original release date | Prod. code |
|---|---|---|---|---|---|
| 1 | "Pilot: Part 1" | Unknown | Unknown | January 8, 1997 | 101 |
| 2 | "Pilot: Part 2" | Unknown | Unknown | January 8, 1997 | 102 |
| 3 | "Why Did the Crawfish Cross the Road?" | Unknown | Unknown | January 15, 1997 | 105 |
| 4 | "Baby-Sitting" | Unknown | Unknown | January 22, 1997 | 103 |
| 5 | "Hijack" | Unknown | Unknown | January 29, 1997 | 106 |
| 6 | "Luther's Temptation" | John Sacret Young | Story by : John Sacret Young & Toni Graphia; Teleplay by : Toni Graphia | March 28, 1997 | 104 |
| 7 | "When the Saints Go Marching In" | Unknown | Unknown | April 4, 1997 | 107 |
| 8 | "Missing" | Unknown | Unknown | April 11, 1997 | 108 |

== Awards and nominations ==
| Year | Award | Result | Category | Recipient |
|---|---|---|---|---|
| 1997 | Emmy Award | Nominated | Outstanding Music Composition for a Series (Dramatic Underscore) | David Langley Hamilton (For pilot episode) |
| 1998 | NAACP Image Awards | Nominated | Outstanding Lead Actress in a Drama Series | Vanessa Bell Calloway |
