= The Trials of Rosie O'Neill =

American drama series (1990–1992)

- Sharon Gless (left) as Rosie O'Neill; Tyne Daly (right) appeared in one episode.
- Genre: Drama
- Created by: Beth Sullivan & Joe Cacaci
- Written by: Beth Sullivan; Joe Cacaci; Josef Anderson; Nicole Yorkin & Dawn Prestwich
- Directed by: Sharron Miller; Reza Badiyi; Nancy Malone; James Frawley; Joel Rosenzweig; David Carson; Victoria Hochberg; Ron Lagomarsino; Gwen Arner; David Hugh Jones
- Starring: Sharon Gless; Dorian Harewood; Ron Rifkin; Georgann Johnson; Lisa Rieffel; Robert Wagner; Ed Asner; David Rasche
- Theme music composer: Ron Ramin
- Opening theme: "I Wish I Knew" performed by Melissa Manchester
- Country of origin: United States
- Original language: English
- No. of seasons: 2
- No. of episodes: 34

Production
- Executive producer: Barney Rosenzweig
- Running time: 60 minutes
- Production companies: MTM Enterprises; The Rosenzweig Company

Original release
- Network: CBS
- Release: September 17, 1990 – May 30, 1992

The Trials of Rosie O'Neill is an American drama television series which aired on CBS from September 17, 1990 to May 30, 1992. The show stars Sharon Gless as Fiona Rose "Rosie" O'Neill, a lawyer working in the public defender's office for the City of Los Angeles. The show marked the return of Gless to series television after her run on Cagney & Lacey.

"Rosie" was created by Beth Sullivan and Joe Cacaci, and produced by Cagney & Lacey producer Barney Rosenzweig, whom Gless married in 1991. The writing staff included Beth Sullivan, Joe Cacaci, Josef Anderson, Nicole Yorkin and Dawn Prestwich. The show was cancelled by CBS in 1992.

== Plot ==
Each episode opens with Rosie talking with her therapist (Rosenzweig), whose face was never seen on camera. Rosie had been at the receiving end of an unwanted divorce, after her attorney husband had an affair. The advertisement for the series which appeared in TV Guide the night the series debuted told the story as follows: "I'm 43 and divorced. He got our law practice, the Mercedes, and the dog. It's only fair that I should be angry. I really liked that dog."

== Cast ==
The show's cast also included Dorian Harewood, Ron Rifkin, Georgann Johnson, Lisa Rieffel and Robert Wagner. Season 2 saw two new cast additions: Ed Asner joined the cast as the cantankerous Kovac, a retired cop hired by Rosie's law firm as one of their investigators. David Rasche was cast in a recurring dramatic role as Patrick Ginty, Rosie's ex-husband who was often referred to but never seen in the first season. Adding Asner to the regular cast squeezed out Dorian Harewood, who was billed as "Special Guest Star" in all season 2 episodes.

== Episodes ==
=== Season 1: 1990–91 ===
No. overall	No. in season	Title	Directed by	Written by	Original release date
1	1	"Starting Over"	Ron Lagomarsino	Beth Sullivan & Joe Cacaci	September 17, 1990
2	2	"The Rapist"	Sharron Miller	Beth Sullivan & Dawn Prestwich & Joe Cacaci & Nicole Yorkin	September 24, 1990
3	3	"So Long Patrick"	David Carson	Josef Anderson	October 1, 1990
4	4	"Late Night Callers"	Reza Badiyi	Dawn Prestwich & Nicole Yorkin	October 15, 1990
5	5	"Shalom"	Reza Badiyi	Story by : Kip Orgullo & Beth Sullivan & Joe Cacaci and Nicole Yorkin & Dawn Prestwich; Teleplay by : Nicole Yorkin & Joe Cacaci & Dawn Prestwich	October 22, 1990
6	6	"An Act of Love"	Joel Rosenzweig	Judy Merl & Paul Eric Myers	October 29, 1990
7	7	"When I'm 44"	Sharron Miller	Beth Sullivan & Josef Anderson & Joe Cacaci & Dawn Prestwich & Nicole Yorkin	November 5, 1990
8	8	"Rosie Gets the Blues"	James Frawley	Terry Abrahamson	November 19, 1990
9	9	"The Gang's All Here"	Nancy Malone	Josef Anderson	November 26, 1990
10	10	"Mr. Right"	Reza Badiyi	Joe Cacaci	December 3, 1990
11	11	"The Man from E.L.F."	Reza Badiyi	Josef Anderson	December 17, 1990
12	12	"Mother Love"	Victoria Hochberg	Nicole Yorkin & Dawn Prestwich	December 31, 1990
13	13	"State of Mind"	Sharron Miller	Story by : Beth Sullivan & Barbara Schiffman; Teleplay by : Beth Sullivan	January 7, 1991
14	14	"Time Will Tell"	Gwen Arner	Debbie Smith & Danna Doyle	January 14, 1991
15	15	"Reunion"	Nancy Malone	Story by : Michael Corey; Teleplay by : Dawn Prestwich & Nicole Yorkin & Josef Anderson	January 28, 1991
16	16	"A Conflict of Interest"	Joel Rosenzweig	Joe Cacaci	June 9, 1991
17	17	"Environmental Robin Hood"	Reza Badiyi	Barry Schkolnick	June 16, 1991
18	18	"Special Circumstances"	Sharron Miller	Dawn Prestwich & Nicole Yorkin	June 23, 1991

=== Season 2: 1991–92 ===
No. overall	No. in season	Title	Directed by	Written by	Original release date
19	1	"Real Mothers"	Sharron Miller	Carol Mendelsohn	September 12, 1991
20	2	"Knock Knock"	James Frawley	Dawn Prestwich & Nicole Yorkin	September 19, 1991
21	3	"Domestic Silence"	Sharron Miller	Susan Miler	September 26, 1991
22	4	"Wolf Pack"	Victoria Hochberg	Kathy McCormick	October 3, 1991
23	5	"This Can't Be Love"	Fred Gerber	Eric Overmyer	October 31, 1991
24	6	"Life Support"	James Frawley	Cai Emmons & Richard Howorth	November 7, 1991
25	7	"Happy Birthday or Else"	Reza Badiyi	Nicole Yorkin & Dawn Prestwich	November 14, 1991
26	8	"Dr. Psychedelic"	Joel Rosenzweig	Carol Mendelsohn	November 15, 1991
27	9	"Family Business"	Victoria Hochberg	Joe Cacaci	November 22, 1991
28	10	"Battle Fatigue"	Sharron Miller	Babs Greyhosky	December 12, 1991
29	11	"Lady Luck"	James Frawley	James Kramer	December 19, 1991
30	12	"The Other Woman"	Reza Badiyi	Carol Mendelsohn	April 11, 1992
31	13	"Heartbreak Hotel"	Nancy Malone	Susan Miller	April 18, 1992
32	14	"Sweet Sixteen"	Reza Badiyi	Dawn Prestwich & Nicole Yorkin	April 25, 1992
33	15	"Double Bind"	Sharron Miller	Tim Raphael & Sally Nemeth & James Kramer	May 9, 1992
34	16	"Role Reversal"	James Frawley	Story by : Sherri Ziff; Teleplay by : Cai Emmons & Richard Howorth and Nicole Yorkin & Dawn Prestwich	May 30, 1992

== Production ==
Production of the series was rushed for airing as a last-minute replacement for the intended Monday night vehicle, Face to Face with Connie Chung, in order to meet the air date.

== Notability ==
The series received some notoriety for its debut episode in which O'Neill jokes about getting breast augmentation surgery. She does so by asking if she "should get my tits done". The use of the word "tits" (famously cited by George Carlin as one of the seven dirty words that could not be said on television or radio) led to some controversy.

On a different note, the series was notable for being one of the few television shows to include an observant Jew—Ben Meyer, Rosie's boss, played by Ron Rifkin—as a regular character. Equally notable is that, although the Meyer character wore a kippah (skullcap), his religious identity was, with the exception of occasional instances when it figured directly in the plot, usually treated casually and without overt mention, without either melodrama or condescension.

== Theme song ==
The theme song, entitled "I Wish I Knew", was written by Carole King and performed over the first season's credits by Melissa Manchester. Carole King made a guest appearance in a first season episode, performing an extended version of the song herself along with Gless and a few other series guests. The second season's intro (changed to the dismay of many fans) dropped the Manchester vocals, instead using an instrumental version of the theme. The series would revert to Manchester's vocal later on in the second season, prior to the cancellation by CBS.

== Reception ==
The show gained a modest reception from critics.

For the episode, State of Mind, in which Rosie becomes preoccupied with curing the ills of a system that allows Irene Hayes (Peggy McCay), a mentally unstable woman, to live on the streets, McCay was awarded a Primetime Emmy for Outstanding Guest Actress in a Drama Series.
