= Lethal Vows =

- Genre: Thriller; Drama
- Written by: Michele Samit; Eric Edson; John Carlen; Dennis Nemec
- Directed by: Paul Schneider
- Starring: John Ritter; Marg Helgenberger; Megan Gallagher
- Music by: Joseph Conlan
- Country of origin: United States
- Original language: English

Production
- Producers: Dennis Nemec; Robert F. Phillips
- Cinematography: Bruce Surtees
- Editor: Andrew Cohen
- Running time: 120 minutes
- Production company: Braun Entertainment Group

Original release
- Network: CBS
- Release: October 13, 1999

Lethal Vows is a 1999 made-for-television American drama film based on the events which led to the trial and conviction of Richard K. Overton for the poisoning death of his third wife, Janet Overton. Starring John Ritter, Marg Helgenberger and Megan Gallagher, the movie premiered October 13, 1999, on CBS.

== Synopsis ==
The movie opens with Ellen Farris, the former wife of Dr. David Farris, getting out of bed after battling an illness. In the kitchen await her two daughters and their father. The daughters and the father leave to go to his house, where his wife, Lorraine Farris, is preparing for her campaign to become counsellor. It is at this point, one sees a little inkling into the sinister character behind Dr. Farris.

Upon his wife being elected counsellor, Dr. Farris can be seen visibly disturbed by the relationship between his wife Loraine and her colleague. Shortly after that, his wife is seen as becoming ill, with similar symptoms to that of his ex-wife. At this point, Ellen starts to become concerned for her health and pleads with her ex-husband to seek help for Lorraine, as he did, to find out the cause of her illness. At this point, from what Ellen is suffering is still unknown.

After his wife suffers more serious episodes and his ex-wife again pleads with him, Dr. Farris takes their son (by Lorraine) Graham and her to Mexico to get her treated. On return, Ellen informs Dr. Farris and Lorraine that she found out she had selenium poisoning due to ingesting pure selenium (which is also found in some health supplements). Ellen then asks Lorraine to get tested for the same thing, which she promises to do. Dr Farris can also be seen throughout the movie to write a computerized journal about his personal life, which shows how distraught he is under his caring and loving persona.

However, just three weeks later, Lorraine drops dead at home in front of Graham and is then quickly cremated by David. The pathologist initially is not able to find any signs of foul play except the faint smell of chlorine when he opened her up during autopsy. Dr. Farris has applied for a marriage license and subsequently marries a woman he met at his wife's election celebration. This course of action places a great level of suspicion on him.

With the help of his ex-wife, the police look into the conditions surrounding Lorraine's death, and after further examination of Ellen Farris, they find out that she is suffering from kidney failure. He was found guilty of first-degree murder and sentenced to life without the possibility of parole. It was also revealed that Lorraine died of cyanide poisoning, to which he switched after travelling to Mexico to speed up the effects of selenium (i.e. death) - it was initially missed due to a chlorine smell, and Dr. Farris was believed to have forced his wife to swallow a water supplement pill shortly before her death to mask the prominent smell of cyanide - hence the chlorine smell.

The motive behind these acts was jealousy and the desire to get rid of his wife; he poisoned his first wife to leave her for his second, Lorraine, with whom he was having an affair prior to their divorce and with whom he shared an apartment under her nose, and he did the same thing to Lorraine, to marry his third wife.

== Overton case ==
Forty-six year old Janet L. Overton (Richard's third wife) collapsed on her driveway in January 1988, as she and her son were on their way to an outing. An autopsy found nothing unusual and could not determine the cause of death (after which she was cremated), but six months later, Overton's first wife, Dorothy Boyer, called investigators and revealed that Richard had tried to poison her 15 years prior with selenium. She stated that this happened after their divorce, when he still had access to her house and would put poisons in her shampoo and coffee, which he confessed to but she declined to press charges when he promised not to do it again and seek counseling. After a re-examination of saved specimens from Janet Overton's autopsy, it was determined that she died of cyanide poisoning.

In a 1995 Orange County trial which received significant media attention, Overton, who had a PhD in psychology and worked as a computer consultant and college lecturer, was convicted of murder and sentenced to life in prison without the possibility of parole, because of the special circumstance of poisoning. In a sentencing report, the prosecuting attorney stated that Overton was “the single most blatant, arrogant, yet curiously effective liar and manipulator of the truth I have ever seen.”

A book on the investigation was written by Frank McAdams, named Final Affair.

In 2021, the Oxygen television channel aired an episode of their show The Real Murders of Orange County detailing this murder.
