= Barry Salt =

Australian film historian (born 1933)

Barry Salt (born 15 December 1933 in Melbourne, Australia) is an Australian film historian.

== Biography ==
Salt was a ballet dancer and member of the Ballet Guild Company of Melbourne in 1955 and 1956, the Western Theatre Ballet of London in 1957, and the Ballet Minerva of London in 1966.

Salt holds a PhD in theoretical physics and taught the subject at Sir John Cass College in London in the late 1960s. Throughout the 1970s, he taught filmmaking at the Royal College of Art, Goldsmiths College, and the Slade School. Salt became a course director at the London Film School in 1988, a position he still holds.

Salt worked throughout the late 1960s and 1970s as a freelance lighting cameraman and has directed six documentaries, but is most noted for having authored the book Film Style and Technology: History & Analysis, an exhaustively researched evaluation of the development of technical filmmaking throughout the 20th century, published in 1983. In 2006, he published Moving into Pictures: More on Film History, Style, and Analysis, a collection of essays which also includes several autobiographical sections.

Salt is a regular contributor to Cinemetrics, the movie measurement database and study tool program created by Yuri Tsivian and Gunars Civjans in 2005.

== Publications ==
- Salt, Barry (2009). Film Style and Technology: History and Analysis (3 ed.). Starword. ISBN 978-0-9509066-5-2.
- Salt, Barry (2006). Moving into Pictures. Starword. ISBN 978-0-9509066-4-5.
- Barry Salt (April 2009). "A brief history of cinematography". Sight & Sound. British Film Institute. Archived from the original on 3 August 2012.
