= Jennifer Tait =

Australian volleyball player (born 1995)

Personal information
- Nationality: Australian
- Born: 4 January 1995 (age 31); Edinburgh, Scotland
- Height: 187 cm (74 in)
- Weight: 80 kg (176 lb)
- Spike: 312 cm (123 in)
- Block: 291 cm (115 in)

Volleyball information
- Position: Middle blocker
- Current club: Australian National Team
- Number: 6 (national team)

Career
Years	Teams
2018–2019	Saturnus Michelbeke
2017–2018	VC Tyrol
2013–2017	Campbell University

National team
Australia

Jennifer Tait (born 4 January 1995) is an Australian female volleyball player.

She was named in the Australian Volleyroos Women's Squad and has participated in the 2017 FIVB Volleyball World Grand Prix, and 2018 FIVB Volleyball Women's Challenger Cup.

She played for Campbell University.
