= Julie Henderson =

American model (born 1986)

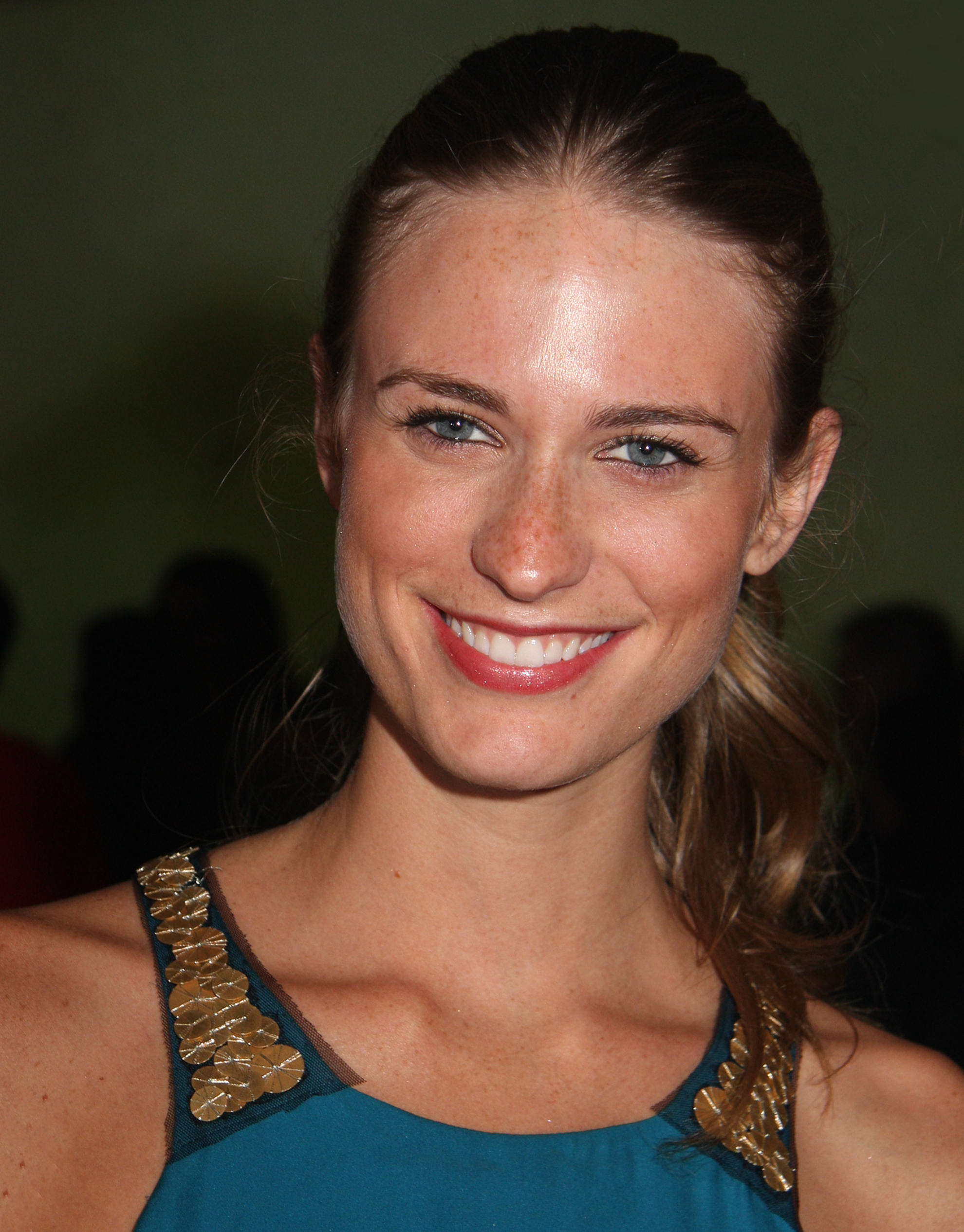
- Henderson in 2009
- Born: Julie Patrice Henderson; March 5, 1986 (age 39); Houston, Texas, United States
- Spouse: Matteo Ferrero De Gubernatis Di Ventimiglia
- Children: 2
- Modeling information
- Height: 5 ft 10 in (1.78 m)
- Hair color: Blonde
- Eye color: Blue
- Agency: New York Model Management (New York); Established Models (London); Modellink (Gothenburg); Model Management (Hamburg); LA Model Management (Los Angeles); Munich Models (Munich)

Julie Patrice Henderson (born March 5, 1986) is an American model known for her appearances in the Sports Illustrated Swimsuit Issue. She has also done advertisements for such notable clients as Benetton and Gant.

== Career ==
Henderson was discovered when she was 13 at the Barbizon Modeling and Acting School of Texas. Local ads and commercials followed her discovery, and by the time she was 16 she was already signed to New York Model Management. After graduation from Katy High School, she went to France to join Ford Models, then moved to New York City and began appearing within the pages of magazines such as Elle Girl and Teen Vogue. While in New York, Henderson modeled on the television show Behind the Velvet Rope. In 2002, she was named "overall professional female model of the year" at the Modeling Association of America International Convention. Henderson subsequently booked gigs worldwide and began doing print work for magazines like Harper’s Bazaar. In 2007, she made her first appearance in the Sports Illustrated Swimsuit Issue, and returned in 2008, 2009, 2010, 2011, 2012, and 2013.

Early in 2009, Henderson was seeing hip hop mogul Russell Simmons who escorted her to the Oscars.

She has appeared in advertisements for Pantene, Hardee's and Benetton.

She is signed to the agencies Models 1, Modelwerk, New York Model Management, and Ford Models Europe – Paris.
