= Beth Sullivan =

American television producer (born 1949)

- Born: August 29, 1949 (age 76); Burbank, California, U.S.
- Occupation: Film and television writer and producer
- Notable work: Dr. Quinn, Medicine Woman

Beth Sullivan (born August 29, 1949, in Burbank, California) is an American film and television writer and producer, best known as the creator and executive producer of the CBS series Dr. Quinn, Medicine Woman.

== Career ==
Sullivan created and served as the sole executive producer of Dr. Quinn, Medicine Woman (a co-production of The Sullivan Company and CBS Entertainment Productions). In doing so, she was the first woman to succeed in a singular capacity in the traditionally male arena of one-hour drama "showrunners." The series received numerous Emmy and People’s Choice Award nominations and won several of each, plus a Golden Globe Award. In addition, the show attained widespread community acknowledgment, receiving the Heroes Memorial Foundation of the United States of America Founder’s Award for honorable recognition of Native Americans, the Genesis Award for spotlighting animal issues, the Family Film Award for promoting family values, the Environmental Media Award for raising environmental awareness, as well as a citation from the Library of Congress for the promotion of literacy.

Prior to Dr. Quinn, Sullivan created and served as co-executive producer of the Emmy and Golden Globe Award-winning one-hour drama series The Trials of Rosie O'Neill. She was a Senior TV Story Analyst, TV Division for Twentieth Century Fox and was named developer of programming in 1978.

Sullivan brought her interest in drama to prime time made-for-television movies, as well. In the 1989–90 season, two of Sullivan’s telefilms, both of which dealt with social issues, aired on NBC and CBS in November sweeps. Most notably, A Cry For Help: The Tracey Thurman Story dramatized the landmark federal lawsuit that resulted in legislation to strengthen police responsibility toward battered wives. It earned both critical acclaim and the highest movie rating of the season. In addition, it received a special commendation from the Los Angeles County Board of Supervisors for its use as a training instrument for law enforcement officers. Sullivan was also honored for her work by the Los Angeles County Domestic Violence Council.

After Dr. Quinn, Medicine Woman, Sullivan developed and executive produced the one-hour drama series The Ponderosa (a prequel to the series Bonanza created and produced by David Dortort) for NBC/PAX from January 2000 until May 2002, when she was catastrophically injured in a car crash. She was then in long-term recovery for many years, while also caring for her twins, Tess and Jack, who were only six at the time of her traumatic injury. They're now in college, and Beth has recently resumed her writing and producing career.

Sullivan is a past member of the Writers Guild of America - West Board of Directors and a former Trustee of the Guild Foundation. She is a graduate of the UCLA School of Theater, Film and Television and a former development and production executive in the television division of 20th Century Fox Studio. Sullivan has lectured in the UCLA Writers Program and taught at the American Film Institute.

For her contributions to the television industry, Sullivan received one of its highest honors, the Genii Award from the American Women in Radio and Television—now called Alliance for Women in Media—organization. As well, she has received top honors from the Women’s American Medical Association, the National Organization of the Daughters of the American Revolution, the YWCA USA, Catholics In the Media, Big Brothers Big Sisters of America and an Emmy citation from the Academy of Television Arts & Sciences for her contributions to the medium.
