= Fremont Dragstrip =

Former motor racing venue

- Location: Fremont, California, United States
- Coordinates: 37.503768°N 121.972511°W
- Address: 44333 Christy Street
- Opened: 1959
- Closed: 1988

Drag Strip
- Length: 0.250 mi (0.402 km)

The Fremont Dragstrip was a racing venue for dragster automobiles that was located in Fremont, California in the San Francisco Bay Area, operating from 1959 until the end of 1988. In its final years, it was part of Baylands Raceway Park. The site lies in the quadrant just south of the intersection of Interstate 880 and Auto Mall Parkway (formerly "Durham Road").

== History ==
The track was constructed on land leased from the Southern Pacific Railroad, which had acquired the land from the U.S. Navy after World War II. The Army had constructed a small airfield on the site just prior to the war, which was subsequently taken over by the Navy during the war (Naval Outlying Landing Field Heath). In 1961, after the Fremont Dragstrip was already in operation, another smaller airfield for gliders, Sky Sailing Airport, was constructed on the southern part of the site directly adjacent to the dragstrip, becoming one of the busiest gliderports in the world prior to its closure.

By the end of the 1960s and early 1970s, the Fremont Dragstrip was in its heyday. Its booming radio ads were familiar and ubiquitous on all the pop radio stations in the San Francisco Bay Area.

The track was used as a location for movies in the late 1970s. More American Graffiti, a 1979 coming-of-age comedy film written and directed by Bill L. Norton, had filmed Paul Le Mat's character, John Milner, drag racing here. Hot Rod, the 1979 made-for-television directed by George Armitage and starring Gregg Henry and Pernell Roberts, filmed races here.

The track held the National Hot Rod Association (NHRA) Golden Gate Nationals from 1981 to 1983 but was snubbed from event TV and video coverage by NHRA of which almost no Known footage exists over the 3 years. . In 1983, Gary Beck ran the first Top Fuel time in the 5.3s, a 5.39 seconds, in Larry Minor's dragster.

"Because of its dense, near-sea-level air and outstanding traction, Baylands is a fast track that has been the site of most production-bike record attempts." In December 1986, Jay Gleason set the fastest quarter-mile of 9.69 seconds on a street bike, Yamaha V-Max.

In 1996 the Catellus Development Corporation converted the land to the Pacific Commons complex development, and the Nueva School.

Evel Knievel performed here on April 13, 1974, hurdling 10 Mack trucks.
