= Philippe Maidenberg =

French architect (born 1966)

- Born: Philippe Maidenberg; August 4, 1966 (age 59); Paris, France
- Occupations: Architect, Interior Designer
- Years active: 1990-present
- Notable work: 123 Sebastopol (2011-2013), Joyce Hotel (2008-2009), Bel Ami (2012), Triangle D'Or (2009-2010), Hotel 34 B (2014-2015)
- Website: http://www.maidenbergarchitecture.com/

Philippe Maidenberg (born August 4, 1966) is a French, Paris-based architect, interior designer and furnishing designer.

Born and raised in France, Maidenberg is best known for his architecture and interior work with hotels throughout Paris. Maidenberg established his firm, Maidenberg Architecture, in 1991. The company is one of the few firms in Paris that specializes in hotel architecture and design. Maidenberg's creative and eclectic style can be found in all of his projects, including Hotel 34B, Hotel Grand Amour, Hotel Bel Ami, Hotel Le Six, Joke Hotel and Hotel 123 Sebastopol, which was honored with the World Luxury Boutique Award in 2015.

== Early life ==
Philippe Maidenberg's parents owned a tour operating company and travel agencies, so as a child, Maidenberg had seen and learned about the hospitality industry. His parents also exposed him to music, film and Parisian culture at an early age. Maidenberg's father particularly loved music, dance and aesthetics. As a teenager, Maidenberg's main creative influence was his continuous love for music. Some of his favorite artists included Thelonious Monk, Dizzy Gillespie, Elvin Jones, Max Roach, and Art Blakey. When the time came for Philippe to decide on a focus of study, he knew that, like his musical heroes, he wanted to do something creative. Inspired by his uncle, who was an architect

== Education ==
Maidenberg completed his main studies at the Parisian architectural university of Paris-Malaquais. As part of his studies, Maidenberg completed a hands-on, three-year internship at the Grand Louvre Pyramid construction site with Ieoh Ming Pei and Partners. Maidenberg has credited the site and company with opening the world of architecture up to him. Following work on the Grand Louvre pyramid, Maidenberg interned at the Murphy/Jahn agency in Chicago, where he worked on his first hotel, a Hyatt near Paris Charles de Gaulle Airport. Maidenberg received his architecture degree in 1990.

== Career ==
Maidenberg's design style ranges from luxurious to outrageous and always utilizes fresh, light and innovative design. His projects are often personal or experience-based, reflecting a passion of Maidenberg's or a specific theme inspired by art and music. Early in his career, Maidenberg worked with the Astotel Group in Paris to design fourteen hotels, beginning with a small part of Hotel 34B and including a full refurbishment of the Lorette Hotel. Maidenberg's partnership with the Astotel Group led to much of his early work, which garnered national and international acclaim. Maidenberg has also worked for the Bessé Group (Hotel Bel Ami – St-Germain) and the Beaumarly Group (Gilbert & Thierry Costes).

Maidenberg's firm has directed over 40 hotel renovations and constructions, and Maidenberg himself continues to be recognized for his unique designs. Maidenberg Architecture is made up of a small team of expert architects and interior designers.

Maidenberg's career philosophy is that each project is a distinct universe, and it is the duty of the architect and designer to artistically translate that universe into a unique and welcoming space.

Maidenberg and his team have collaborated with A-list celebrities and creators, including Claude Lelouch, Jean-Paul Belmondo, Rickie Lee Jones, Ennio Morricone, Archie Shepp, Manu Katché, Jacques Higelin, MC Solaar, Daniele Thompson, Elsa Zylberstein, and Agnes Jaoui.

For each project, Maidenberg Architecture designs an array of furniture, textiles and lighting.

== Awards and honors ==
- World Luxury Boutique Award Nominee 2014, Hotel 123 Sebastopol.
- TripAdvisor Top 25 Hotels in France 2016, Hotel 123 Sebastopol (#4).
- TripAdvisor 2014, 2015 and 2016, Hotel 123 Sebastopol and Hotel 34B ranked as #1 position among 1800 hotels in Paris.
- Worldwide Hospitality Award Nominee 2014, Hotel 123 Sebastopol.
- Archi Design Club Awards Nominee 2015, Hotel 123 Sebastopol.

== Expert appearances ==
- Judge, Tel Aviv University Architecture Competition, 2014, 2015, 2016
- Guest Speaker, Tarket (2015)
- Guest Speaker, L'Oréal Conference (2016)
- Guest Speaker, Orie (2016)
- Guest Speaker, Maison & Objet, Paris 2015
- Interview, La Maison France 5 Television.
- Interview, Une brique dans le ventre
- Interview, Teva Déco
- Interview, BFM TV
- Interview, Marie-Claire Maison

== Publications ==
Maidenberg's projects have been listed as top hotels in Louis Vuitton Paris City Guide and Michelin Guide Paris and featured in Intramuros, Hôtel chics et intimes de Paris, Architectural Digest (Collector), Hotels de Paris and hotel design book Le Style Eiffel. Maidenberg and his work have been featured in the top design and travel publications, including Architectural Digest, Condé Nast Traveler, Departures, Elle Decor, Figaro Magazine, Home Rally China, Hotel & Lodge, Ideat, Interior Design, Hospitality Design, Maison Française, and Women's Wear Daily.
