= Sue Lyon =

American actress (1946–2019)

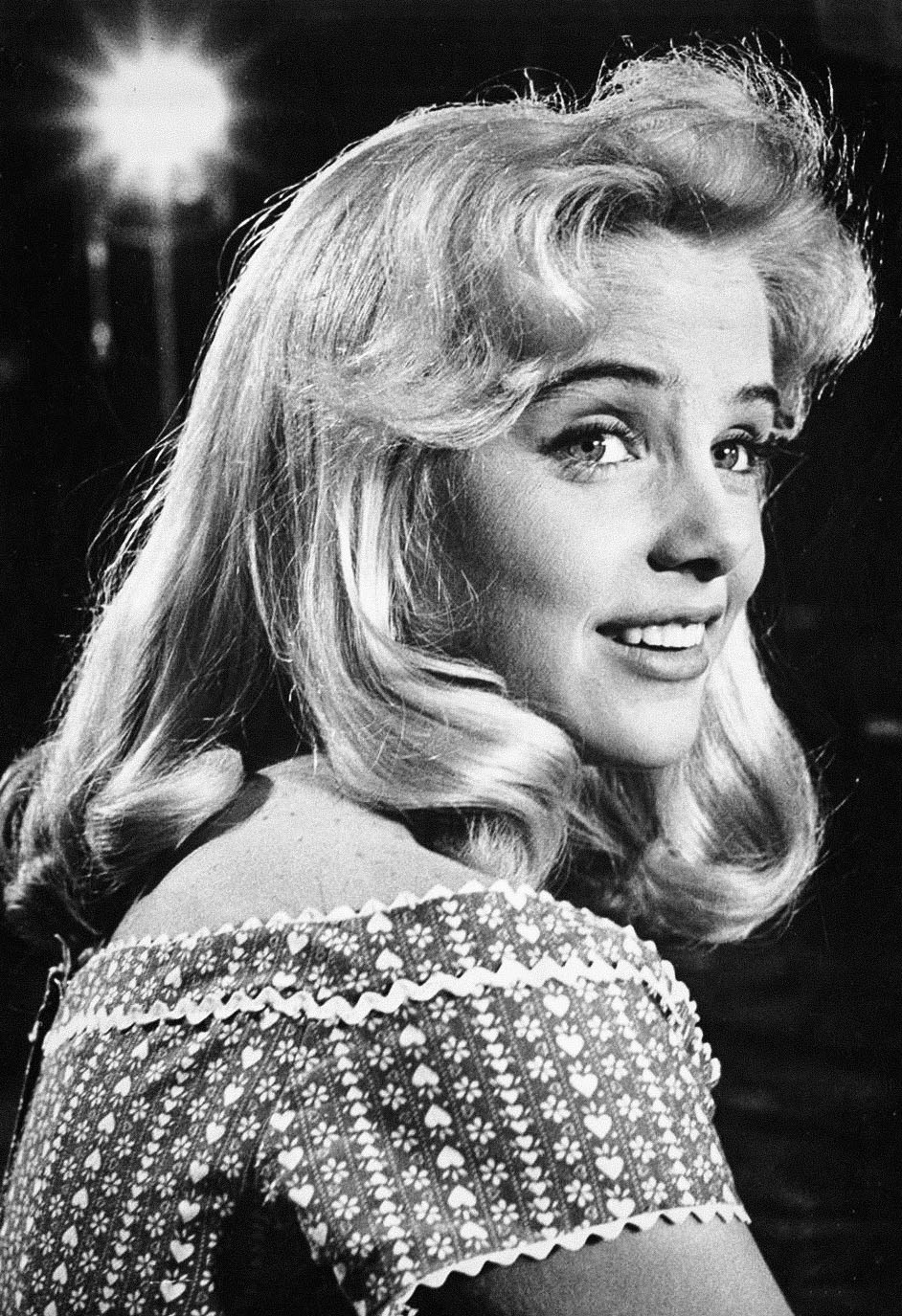
- Portrait of Lyon by Stanley Kubrick in 1962
- Born: Suellyn Lyon; July 10, 1946; Davenport, Iowa, U.S.
- Died: December 26, 2019 (aged 73); West Hollywood, California, U.S.
- Education: Los Angeles City College; Santa Monica College
- Occupation: Actress
- Years active: 1959–1980
- Spouses: Hampton Fancher (m. 1963; div. 1965) Roland Harrison (m. 1971; div. 1972) Cotton Adamson (m. 1973; div. 1974) Edward Weathers (m. 1983; div. 1984) Richard Rudman (m. 1985; div. 2002)
- Children: 2

Suellyn Lyon (July 10, 1946 – December 26, 2019) was an American actress who is most famous for playing the title role in Stanley Kubrick's 1962 film adaptation of Vladimir Nabokov's novel Lolita, for which she won a Golden Globe Award and was nominated for both a Laurel Award and a Photoplay Award.

Lyon's early career flourished with appearances in such high-profile films as John Huston's The Night of the Iguana (1964), John Ford's 7 Women (1966), the Frank Sinatra detective film Tony Rome (1967), and the George C. Scott comedy The Flim-Flam Man (1967). However, her career diminished in the 1970s and she subsequently retired from acting after making Alligator, which was released in 1980.

In 1991, Lyon featured prominently in the artwork for Welsh rock band Manic Street Preachers' single "Stay Beautiful".

== Early life ==
Suellyn Lyon, called Sue, was born on July 10, 1946, in Davenport, Iowa. She was the youngest of five children of Sue (née Karr) Lyon and her husband; her father died before her first birthday. To help her family pay bills, Lyon worked as a child model in Dallas. Her mother soon took the family to Los Angeles, where she thought there would be more opportunity. There, at 11 years old she began modeling for the JCPenney agency. Lyon made her acting debut in 1959, with appearances in Dennis the Menace and The Loretta Young Show.

In California, Lyon was friends with Michelle Gilliam, who was two years older. Gilliam would achieve fame as Michelle Phillips, after marrying John Phillips and becoming part of the pop music quartet The Mamas & the Papas. According to Phillips, she shared the controversial novel Lolita with Lyon in 1960, the year before she auditioned for the part. In a 1962 interview with German TV as part of the film's promotion, Lyon said she and her mother had read it and discussed the novel after she was cast in the part.

== Career ==
=== Lolita ===
With only two acting credits, at the age of 14, Lyon was cast in the role of Dolores "Lolita" Haze in Stanley Kubrick's film Lolita (1962). She was chosen for the role from 800 teenagers. Lyon co-starred with James Mason, then aged 53. Nabokov, who wrote the novel and much of the screenplay, described her as the "perfect nymphet".

Lyon got the role after the original choice, British actress Jill Haworth, was unavailable. The role was then offered to child star Hayley Mills, then under contract to Walt Disney, but the studio vetoed the casting. On September 28, 1960, the Los Angeles Times reported the casting of Lyon.

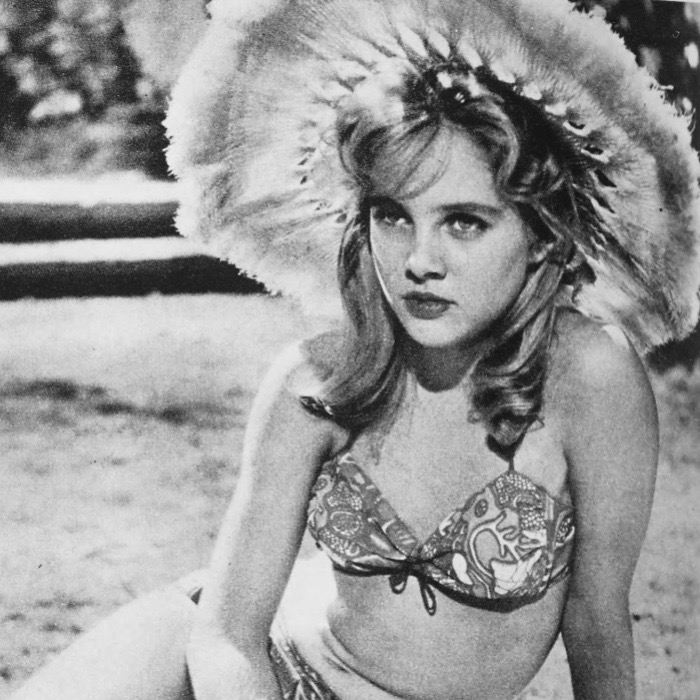
Lyon as the titular character in Lolita

Lolita had its world premiere on June 13, 1962, at Loew's State Theatre in New York City, two days after its press screening. Lolita was released in West Germany on June 21 and had its London premiere on September 6. It was released in France on November 5. Lyon gained critical acclaim for her performance, becoming an instant celebrity and winning a Golden Globe Award for Most Promising Newcomer—Female. Variety wrote, "Sue Lyon makes an auspicious film debut as the deceitful child-woman who'd just as soon go to a film as romp in the hay. It's a difficult assignment and if she never quite registers as either wanton or pathetic it may be due as much to the compromises of the script as to her inexperience." However, Bosley Crowther of The New York Times was less enthusiastic: "She looks to be a good 17 years old, possessed of a striking figure and a devilishly haughty teenage air." He went on, "The distinction is fine, we will grant you, but she is definitely not a 'nymphet.'" Lyon was 15 when it premiered, too young to watch the film in a theater.

In 1962, MGM Records released a 7" vinyl single recorded by Lyon, singing the lyrics "Ya ya" in Nelson Riddle's "Lolita Ya Ya", a send up of yé-yé singers. The B-side had her singing "Turn off The Moon". Both songs were co-written by producer James B. Harris' brother, J. Robert Harris. Neither song charted.

Although Vladimir Nabokov originally thought that Sue Lyon was the right selection to play Lolita, years later Nabokov said that the ideal Lolita would have been Catherine Demongeot, a young French actress who had played the child Zazie in Louis Malle's Zazie in the Metro (1960). The tomboyish Demongeot was four years younger than Lyon.

=== Post-Lolita career ===
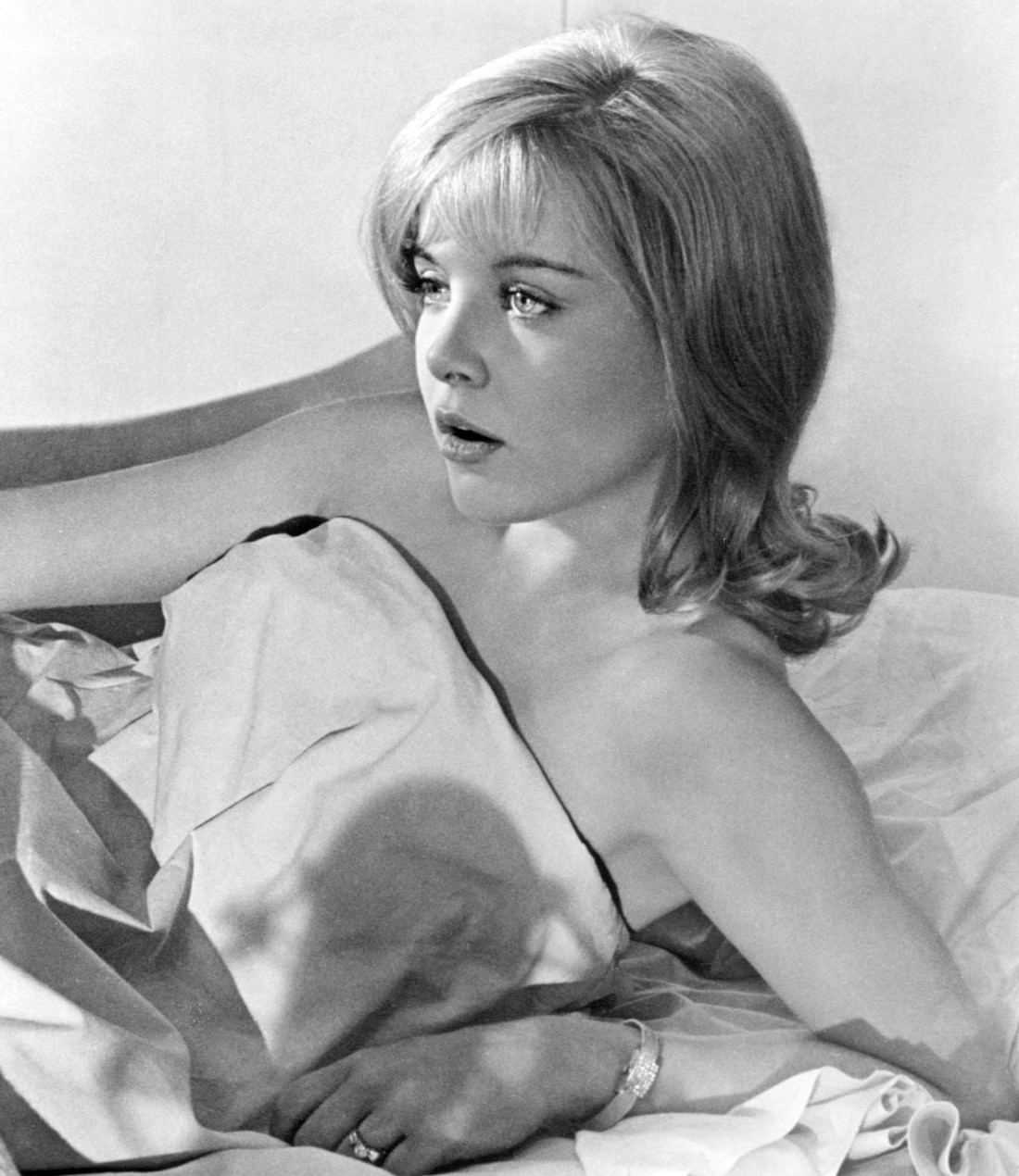
Lyon in Tony Rome (1967)

In 1960, Lyon was bound to a seven-year professional services contract to Kubrick, Lolita producer James B. Harris and production company Seven Arts Productions, when she accepted the part in Lolita.

The Night of the Iguana (1964), in which she appeared opposite Richard Burton and Ava Gardner, was a Seven Arts picture. Lyon was featured on the theatrical release poster, embracing Burton. The film was released by Metro-Goldwyn-Mayer, which Seven Arts had a deal with, as was 7 Women (1967), in which Lyon co-starred with first-billed Oscar-winner Anne Bancroft, to whom Lyon received second-billing. Lyon also was second-billed to George C. Scott in The Flim-Flam Man (1967) and Frank Sinatra in Tony Rome (1967).

After the Kubrick-Harris-Seven Arts contract expired, she did not again appear in A-list motion pictures. She appeared in the 1969 low-budget spaghetti western Four Rode Out, top-billed over former Bonanza star Pernell Roberts, whose career was in eclipse. In 1969, she also appeared in a TV version of Arsenic and Old Lace that starred Bob Crane of Hogan's Heroes and Helen Hayes. She also made the first of her two appearances on the TV comedy Love American Style that year.

In the 1970s, her career likely was negatively impacted by her marriage to black football player Roland Harrison in 1971 and a subsequent marriage to imprisoned murderer Cotton Adamson in 1973. Marriages between white people and black people were rare in 1971, the year she co-starred with George Hamilton in Evel Knievel, a higher-end B-film. State laws banning interracial marriage were not declared unconstitutional in the United States until the Supreme Court's 1967 Loving v. Virginia decision.

Lyon and Harrison had a daughter, Nona Merrill Harrison, who was born in Los Angeles in 1972.

A minor hit at the box office, taking in $4,000,000 in rentals (equivalent to approximately $31,799,507 in 2025) against a $450,000 budget, Evel Knievel was the last significant motion picture Lyon starred in. After her marriages to Harrison and Adamson, Lyon worked in supporting roles in B-films, television films and guest spots on TV series.

=== Grade Z film star ===
Towards the end of the 1970s, she began appearing in Z films, including two produced by Charles Band. In her first film for Band, Crash! (1977), Oscar-winner Jose Ferrer played her husband, who is trying to kill her. She retaliates by using her occult powers to manipulate objects to kill him.

In her second film for Band, Lyon played the wife of Kirk Scott's astrophysicist character in the sci-fi film End of the World, which received poor reviews after it was released in 1977 as part of a double bill with another low-budget sci-fi movie. The film starred Christopher Lee, and he later lamented his participation in the film, claiming he was misled as to the quality of the picture by producer Band.

Lyon followed this up with a part in The Astral Factor, which was also known as The Astral Fiend on its initial release in 1978. Yet another low-budget sci-fi film, the Astral film went through three directors. She then graced Towing, a low-budget comedy based on newspaper columnist Mike Royko's expose of unethical vehicle towing companies. Also known as Who Stole My Wheels? and Garage Girls, the Chicago-based film featuring one of the first appearances of actor Dennis Franz got one star and a half from critic Roger Ebert.

Lyon ceased working in the entertainment industry after a bit part in the 1980 B-film Alligator. In 1984, a recut version of The Astral Factor re-titled Invisible Strangler was released, making it the last time Sue Lyon appeared in a motion picture.

== Personal life ==
Lyon rarely entered the public realm after the end of her film career in the 1980s, in 1996 she made an appearance. During this she stated:

"My destruction as a person dates from that film. Lolita exposed me to temptations no girl of that age should undergo. I defy any pretty girl who is rocketed to stardom at 14 in a sex nymphet role to stay on a level path thereafter."

=== Relationships and family ===
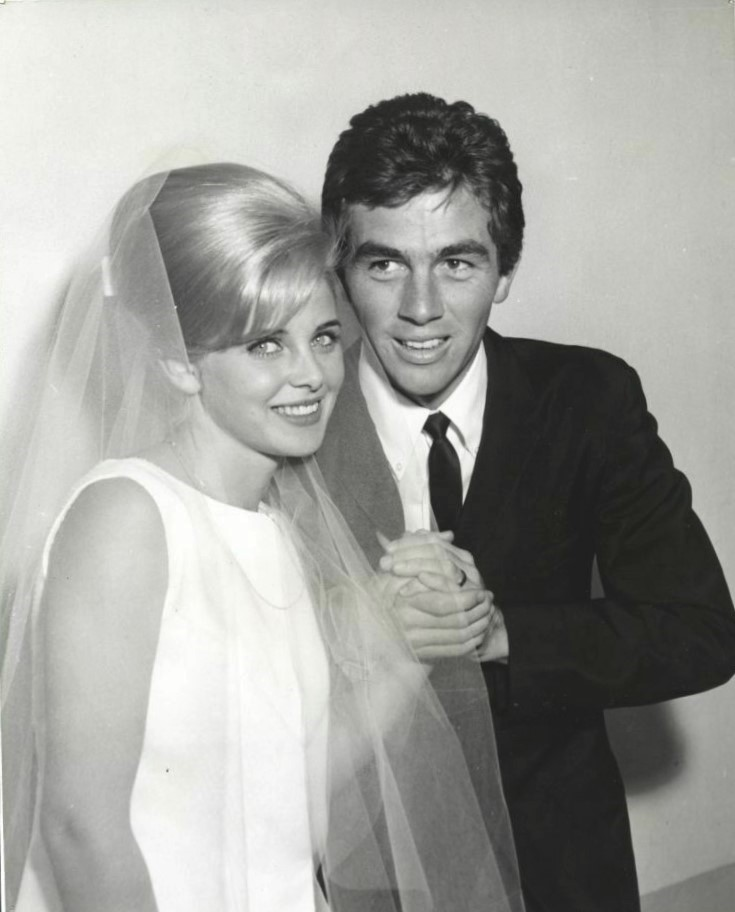
Lyon with her first husband Hampton Fancher in 1964

In February 1964, 17-year-old Lyon married Hampton Fancher, who was seven years her senior. They divorced only ten months later, with Lyon citing '"mental cruelty" as the reason. Around the same time, her older brother Mike died of a drug overdose. In 1971 she married black photographer and football coach Roland Harrison, with whom she had a daughter named Nona in 1972, but they divorced the same year due to pressures relating to racism.

Her third marriage, in November 1973, to Gary D. Adamson, took place in Colorado State Penitentiary, where he was incarcerated. He had been convicted of robbery and second-degree murder. The union was contentious and ended in 1974. She said at the time that people in the film industry had told her he had a negative effect on her career. Discussing her divorce from Adamson, Lyon said, "I've been told by people in the film business, specifically producers and film distributors, that I can't get a job because I'm married to Cotton. Therefore, right now we can't be married. But that doesn't mean love has died. I'll always love him."

In 1983, she married Edward Weathers, but they divorced the following year. Her fifth and final marriage was to radio engineer Richard Rudman; they were married from 1985 until their divorce in 2002.

According to Nona, Lyon suffered from bipolar disorder. Throughout her marriages her mental health declined.

In 2020, Michelle Phillips of the folk-rock band the Mamas & the Papas told journalist Sarah Weinman that producer James B. Harris engaged in a forced sexual relationship with Lyon during her stay in England to film Lolita when she was 14 years old. When contacted by Weinman, the 92-year-old Harris refused to respond to the allegation. At the time Stanley Kubrick's Lolita was in production, the age of consent in the UK was 16 years old but 18 in Lyon's home state of California. Harris was nearly 18 years older than Lyon, and a married man.

== Death ==
Lyon died in West Hollywood, California, on the morning of December 26, 2019, at the age of 73. While no specific cause of death was given, she was reported to have been in poor health "for some time".

"To be pretty and to stay pretty are two different things. You can't take anything for granted, and it's foolish to think you can. You have to think ahead of how to build health and happiness. You have to learn to avoid what is going to hurt you or someone else." — Sue Lyon, 1967

== Filmography ==
=== Film ===
Year	Title	Role	Notes
1962	Lolita	Dolores "Lolita" Haze	Golden Globe Award for Most Promising Newcomer
1964	The Night of the Iguana	Charlotte Goodall	
1966	7 Women	Emma Clark	
1967	The Flim-Flam Man	Bonnie Lee Packard	
1967	Tony Rome	Diana Pines	
1969	Arsenic and Old Lace	Elaine Dodd	TV film
1969	Four Rode Out	Myra Polsen	
1970	But I Don't Want to Get Married!	Laura	ABC Movie of the Week
1971	Evel Knievel	Linda	
1973	Murder in a Blue World	Ana Vernia	
1973	Tarot	Angela	
1976	Smash-Up on Interstate 5	Burnsey	TV film
1976	Crash!	Kim Denne	
1977	End of the World	Sylvia Boran	
1977	Don't Push, I'll Charge When I'm Ready	Wendy Sutherland	TV film, made in 1969
1978	The Astral Factor	Darlene DeLong	Re-released in 1984 as The Invisible Strangler
1978	Towing	Lynn	
1980	Alligator	NBC Newswoman	(Final film role)

=== Television ===
Year	Title	Role	Notes
1959	Letter to Loretta	Laurie	1 episode ("Alien Love") as Suellyn Lyon
1960	Dennis the Menace	Blonde with Valentine Card (uncredited)	1 episode ("Miss Cathcart's Sunsuit")
1969–1974	Love, American Style	Barbara Eric; Julie	2 episodes ("Love and the Extra Job/Love and the Flying Finletters/Love and the Golden Worm/Love and the Itchy Condition/Love and the Patrolperson", "Love and the Medium/Love and the Bed/Love and the High School Flop-Out")
1970	The Virginian	Belinda Ballard	1 episode ("Experiment at New Life")
1971	Men at Law	Bunny Phillips	1 episode ("Marathon")
1971	Night Gallery	Betsy	1 episode ("The Boy Who Predicted Earthquakes/Miss Lovecraft Sent Me/The Hand of Borgus Weems/Phantom of What Opera?")
1978	Police Story	Caroline	1 episode ("River of Promises")
1978	Fantasy Island	Jill Nolan	1 episode ("Reunion/Anniversary")
