= Guy Owen =

Guy Owen may refer to:

- Guy Owen (figure skater) (1913–1952), Canadian figure skater
- Guy Owen (novelist) (1925–1981), American novelist
