= Punchboard =

Type of game board

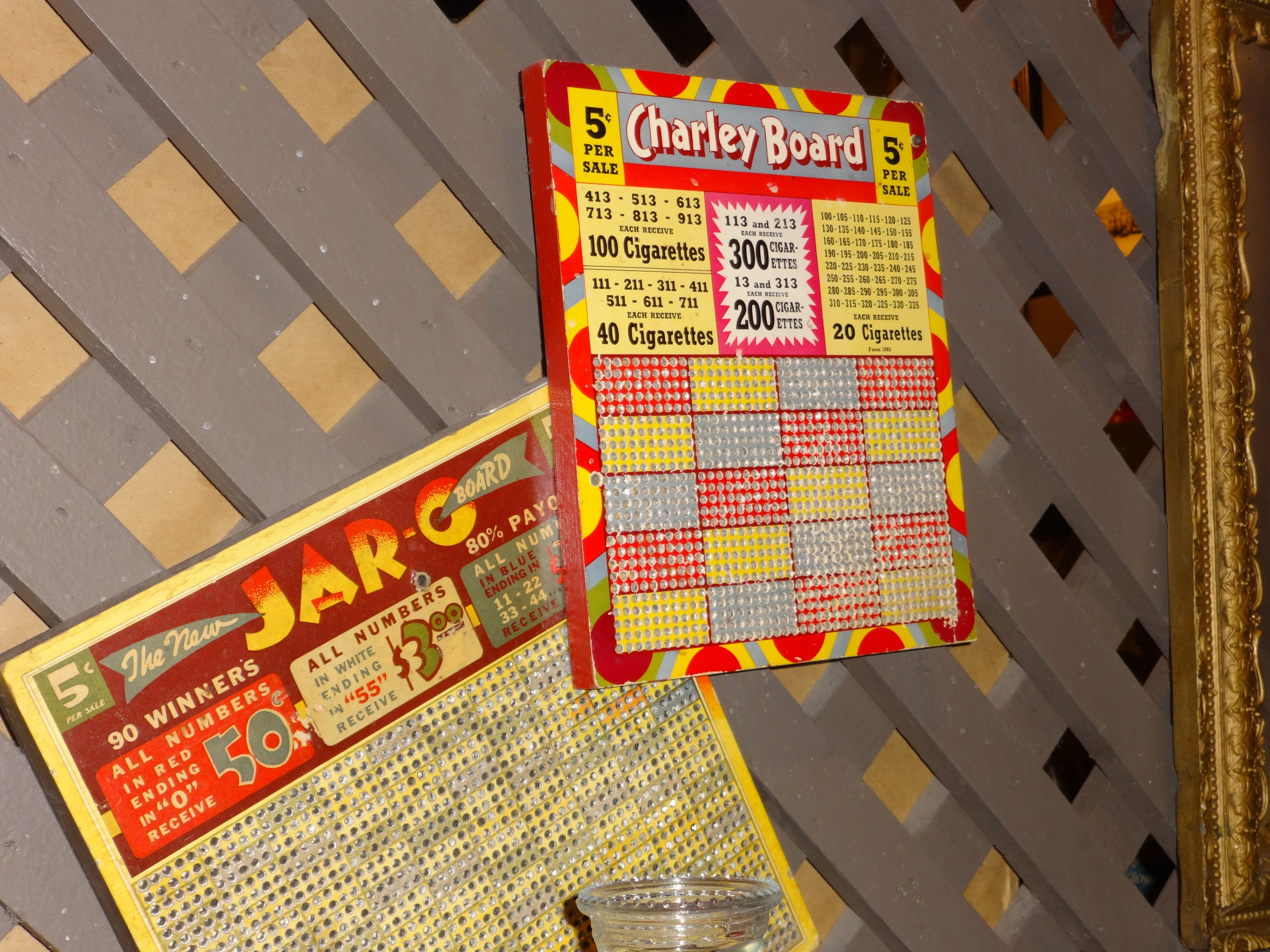
Jar-o and Charley Board punchboards

A punchboard is a game board, primarily consisting of a number of holes, which was used once for lottery games.

== History ==
=== Origin ===
Punchboards were originally used in the 18th century for gambling purposes. A local tavern owner would construct a game board out of wood, drill small holes in it, and fill each hole with a small paper ticket or gamepiece. The holes were then typically covered with paper or foil. After a patron bought a chance at the punchboard, he would puncture one of the hole's paper or foil covers with a nail and retrieve the ticket/gamepiece. If the gamepiece contained a winning number, the patron won the prize.

In the nineteenth century, board operators eventually started cheating, selecting holes on the patron’s behalf rather than letting the patron choose. The punchboard's use started to decline.

=== Paper punchboard ===
In the late 1800s, a new type of punchboard was introduced. This one involved putting paper in both the front and back of the hole (to help prevent operators from cheating). These new punchboards became popular purchases at drugstores, and they were sold with a metal stylus. The punchboard soon became increasingly similar to today's lottery tickets.

Soon, the punchboard became cheap and easy to assemble, and the industry flourished. Noted gambling author John Scarne estimates that 30 million punchboards were sold in the years between 1910 and 1915. He also estimates that 50 million punchboards were sold in 1939 alone, during the peak of their popularity.

Punchboards were often used by the slot-machine machine rackets as a wedge for pushing into communities where slot machines were illegal. Punchboards used for gambling in California in the 1910s were a game "where the player puys for the privilege of inserting a disk in a covered hole on a board and punches out a number, which, if it corresponds to a certain number on the board, a prize is awarded the player."

=== After World War II ===
After World War II, use of the punchboard as a gambling tool began to decline because many people frowned at its gambling-like nature, and the punchboard was outlawed in many states. The use of punchboards for advertisement started to gain popularity. Many companies started hiding goods such as bottles of beer and cigarettes inside punchboards. Zippo lighters reportedly sold more than 300,000 lighters through punchboard advertising between 1934 and 1940.

== Larceny ==
People have been cheating on punchboards ever since they were first invented. Many operators know where the big prize holes are; they used to create punchboards with very few holes so they could easily track the big money.

Other gamblers could make a dirty deal with the customers: give the customer a "map" of where the big prizes are on the punchboard. This came to prevention by the use of serial numbers: the customer would present the slip to the operator, and if the serial numbers matched, the customer was declared a winner.

== Other references in popular culture ==
- The 1935 to 1959 radio series Fibber McGee and Molly frequently referred to the punchboard at Fibber's Elks Lodge.
- In the 1940 musical film Strike Up The Band, a character suggests punchboards as a way to earn money pay for the titular band's fare to Chicago.
- The 1947 21-part storyline "Pennies for Plunder", from the radio series The Adventures of Superman, revolved around a crooked punchboard racket directed at children.
- in the 1957 novel The Web of Evil by Roger Normandie (pseudonym of Orrie Hitt, as a scam run by several of the main characters.
- The 1961 episode "The Troubleshooter", of the television series The Untouchables, involved illegal mob activities around punchboards.
- The 1963 novel The Grifters, by Jim Thompson, includes the character Roy Dillon attempting to grift a punchboard in a bar.
- The 1963 episode "The Exiles", of the television series The Virginian, features the search for the character Ralph Slocum, a murderer who is an alleged punchboard salesman.
- The 1967 feature film The Flim-Flam Man involved illegal gambling through punchboards.
- The 1974 novel Winter in the Blood, by James Welch, includes a character using a punchboard.
- Since 1978, the "Punch-a-Bunch" pricing game, on the American television game show The Price Is Right (1972–present), has included an over-sized punchboard.
- The 1993 series finale of the television series Quantum Leap includes a group of miners buying punchboard chances.
- The 2013 novel Joyland, by Stephen King, includes the character Madame Fortuna, who has a punchboard in her cash box.
