= Four Rode Out =

1971 film by John Peyser

- Film poster
- Directed by: John Peyser
- Written by: Don Balluck; Paul Harrison; Dick Miller
- Produced by: Richard H. Landau; Pedro Vidal
- Starring: Sue Lyon; Pernell Roberts; Julián Mateos; Leslie Nielsen
- Cinematography: Rafael Pacheco
- Edited by: Juan Serra
- Music by: Janis Ian
- Distributed by: Sagittarius Productions; Andrés Salvador Molina
- Release date: October 17, 1969
- Running time: 99 minutes
- Countries: United States; Spain
- Language: English

Four Rode Out is a 1969 Spanish/American adventure/western film starring Sue Lyon, Pernell Roberts and Leslie Nielsen.

== Plot ==
In this western, a Mexican desperado tries to flee from his partner, a determined girlfriend, and a US Marshal.

== Cast ==
- Sue Lyon as Myra Polsen
- Pernell Roberts as U.S. Marshal Ross
- Julián Mateos as Fernando Núñez
- Leslie Nielsen as Mr. Brown
- María Martín as Rosa
- Leonard Bell as Hotel Clerk
- John Clark as Livery Stable Owner
- Charles Drace as Mr. Polsen
- Neil Wright as Priest
- Janis Ian as The Singer

== See also ==
- Cinema of Spain
