= Tony Rome =

1967 film by Gordon Douglas

- Original one-sheet poster
- Directed by: Gordon Douglas
- Screenplay by: Richard L. Breen
- Based on: Miami Mayhem; 1960 novel by Marvin Albert
- Produced by: Aaron Rosenberg
- Starring: Frank Sinatra; Jill St. John; Richard Conte; Gena Rowlands; Simon Oakland; Jeffrey Lynn; Lloyd Bochner; Sue Lyon
- Cinematography: Joseph Biroc
- Edited by: Robert Simpson
- Music by: Lee Hazlewood (title song); Billy May
- Color process: DeLuxe Color
- Production company: Arcola Pictures
- Distributed by: Twentieth Century Fox Film Corporation
- Release date: November 10, 1967
- Running time: 110 minutes
- Country: United States
- Language: English
- Budget: $3.5 million
- Box office: $4 million

Tony Rome is a 1967 American neo-noir mystery crime thriller film directed by Gordon Douglas and starring Frank Sinatra in the title role, alongside Jill St. John, Sue Lyon and Gena Rowlands. It was adapted from Marvin H. Albert's 1960 novel Miami Mayhem.

The story follows the adventures of Miami private investigator Tony Rome (Sinatra) in his quest to locate a missing diamond pin that belongs to a wealthy heiress.

A sequel, Lady in Cement, was made in 1968, again featuring Sinatra as Tony Rome, and co-starring Raquel Welch and Dan Blocker. Appearing in both films was Richard Conte as Miami police lieutenant Dave Santini.

Both films are examples of a late-1960s neo-noir trend that revived and updated the hard-boiled detective and police dramas of the 1940s. Other films in this genre include Harper (1966), The Detective (1968), which also starred Sinatra, as well as Point Blank (1967), Bullitt (1968), Madigan (1968) and Marlowe (1969).

== Plot ==
Tony Rome is an ex-cop turned private investigator who lives on a powerboat in Miami, Florida, called ‘Straight Pass’. This is a reference to the fact that Tony also has a gambling problem. He is asked by his former partner, Ralph Turpin, to take home a young woman who had been left unconscious in a hotel room.

The woman, Diana (née Kosterman) Pines, is the daughter of rich construction magnate Rudolph Kosterman, who subsequently hires Rome to find out why his daughter is acting so irrationally.

After regaining consciousness, Diana discovers that a diamond pin that she had been wearing the night before has gone missing. Diana and her stepmother Rita hire Rome to find the lost pin.

Rome is chloroformed and beaten by a pair of thugs, and Turpin is found murdered in Rome's office. Lt. Dave Santini of the Miami police investigates the crime scene and demands information from Rome, who is an old friend.

Rome gets help from a divorcee, Ann Archer.

An attempt is made on Kosterman's life, and a jeweler is found murdered.

Rome discovers that Diana has been selling her stepmother's jewels and giving the money to Lorna, her biological mother, but also that the pin (mailed to Rome by Turpin after trying to fence it) was a fake. Tracking down an unknown man with a gimp leg he calls Catleg, Tony determines that Rita was being blackmailed and had previously sold the real jewels to pay her ex-husband's blackmail demands.

The trail leads to Rita's dead ex-husband and Diana's stepfather, Adam Boyd, an abortion doctor stripped of his license, who ordered the killing of Kosteman, believing Diana would then inherit his entire estate (as Boyd had found documents showing Rita's current marriage was void), and that Diana would then provide generously for her mother.

The case solved, Rome invites Ann for a romantic getaway on his boat, but she decides to go back to her husband.

== Cast ==
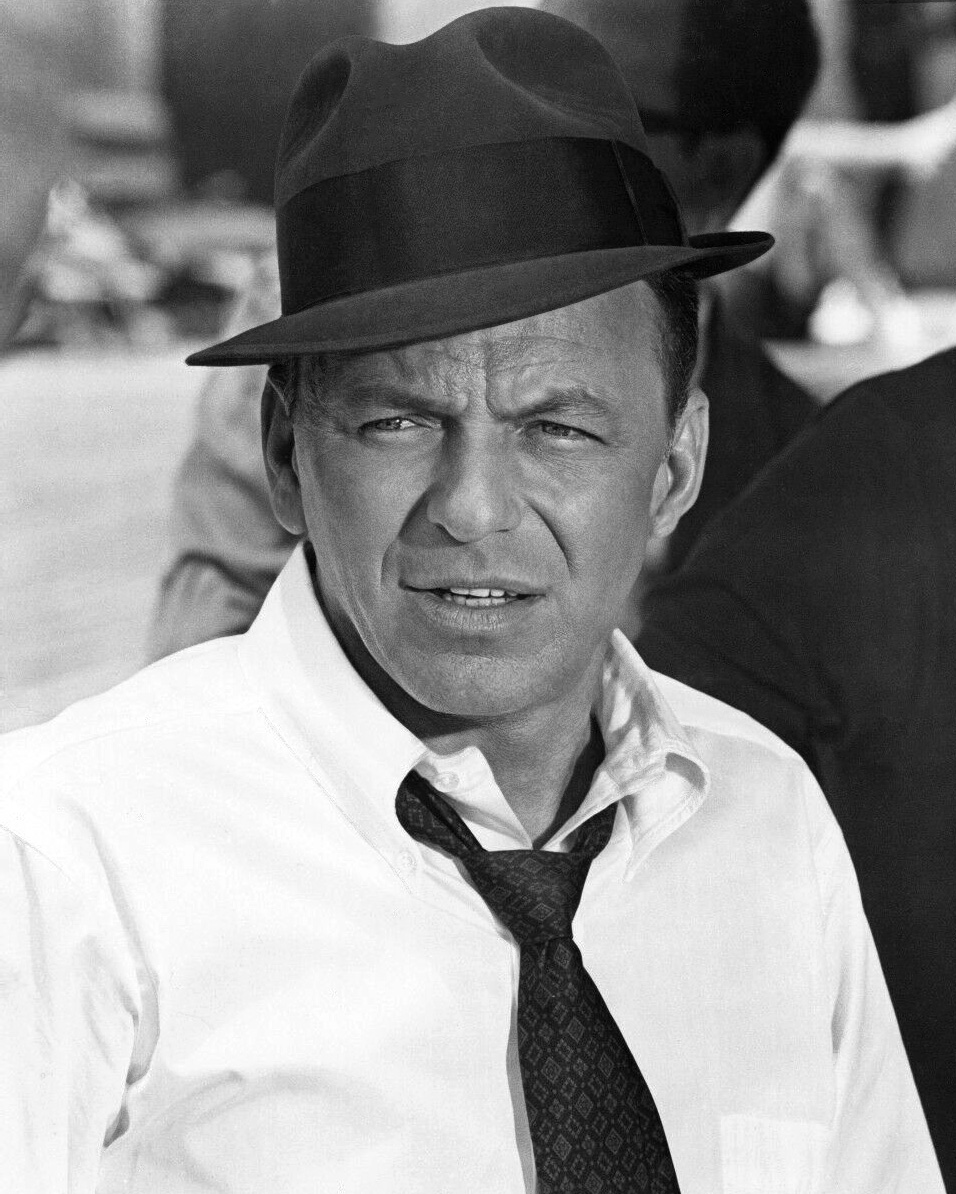
Sinatra as Tony Rome

- Frank Sinatra as Tony Rome
- Jill St. John as Ann Archer
- Sue Lyon as Diana Pines
- Gena Rowlands as Rita Kosterman
- Simon Oakland as Rudy Kosterman
- Richard Conte as Lt. Dave Santini
- Robert J. Wilke as Turpin
- Jeffrey Lynn as Boyd
- Lloyd Bochner as Rood
- Jeanne Cooper as Lorna
- Shecky Greene as Catleg
- Rocky Graziano as Packy

Deanna Lund plays a lesbian stripper but, embarrassed by the role, she asked for her name to be removed from the credits. She also appears in the film's poster.

== Production ==
Filming took place on location in Miami, Florida, with some scenes being shot during the day at the Fontainebleau Miami Beach, where Sinatra was performing in the evenings. Other scenes were filmed at the Corsair Hotel at 101 South Ocean Drive, Miami Beach.

It was partially filmed on the property that novelist Douglas Fairbairn was renting at the time.

Nancy Sinatra, daughter of Frank, sang the film's eponymous title track which then appeared on her album, Nancy Sinatra, The Hit Years (Rhino Records).

Tony Rome, The Detective and Lady in Cement were all directed by Gordon Douglas. The three films were packed together in a DVD box set by 20th Century Fox in 2005. Douglas also directed Sinatra in Young at Heart (1954) and Robin and the 7 Hoods (1964).

Randy Newman is co-credited on a soundtrack song.

== Critical reception ==
Tony Rome was met with mixed reviews upon release. Many film critics felt that Sinatra was paying homage to his late friend Humphrey Bogart, since he was part of the original "Rat Pack" and had dated (and nearly married) Bogart's widow, Lauren Bacall. Though one recent writer sees Sinatra as having created his own version of the private detective, making him a more jaunty and less dour incarnation than Bogart's famous characterizations, the New York Times had been quite critical in 1967 of Sinatra's characterization for precisely that reason: "Evidently Frank Sinatra is trying to go the Humphrey Bogart route....The cryptic Miami Beach gumshoe he plays in this hard-nosed mystery film...is such a conscious or unconscious imitation of Mr. Bogart's prototypical Sam Spade in the classic 'The Maltese Falcon' that you'd guess Mr. Sinatra has been spending a lot of time watching the 'Late Late Show'....Further, it looks as though the people who wrote and directed this film...have been studying their 'Late Late Show' too. Their story...is strangely reminiscent of 'The Maltese Falcon' in several essentials and details....All in all, there's enough demonstration of social vulgarity, degeneracy and crime in the course of this vivid melodrama to satisfy the most lurid tourist taste and it's put forth with speed, dexterity and a nice running patter of gags....But for all the slickness of it — for all the self-assurance of Mr. Sinatra's acting style and competence of the others — this thing is still a pat, synthetic job. Mr. Sinatra is nobody's Bogart."

On the review aggregator website Rotten Tomatoes, Tony Rome has a 63% approval rating, based on 8 reviews. Roger Ebert of the Chicago-Sun Times gave the film 3 out of 4 stars, writing, "Sinatra is no Bogart, which won't come as news, and Tony Rome is no The Maltese Falcon. But it plays the detective game by the rules, and that's something."

=== Box office ===
According to Fox records, the film needed to earn $6,875,000 in rentals to break even, but fell short at $6,250,000.

== See also ==
- List of American films of 1967
