= Towing (film) =

- Theatrical release poster
- Directed by: Maura Smith
- Written by: Maura Smith
- Produced by: Frederick A. Smith
- Starring: Jennifer Ashley; Bobby Di Cicco; Sue Lyon
- Cinematography: Jack Richards
- Music by: Martin Rubenstein
- Production company: Sibling Productions
- Release date: 1978
- Running time: 85 minutes
- Country: United States
- Language: English

Towing (also titled Who Stole My Wheels? and Garage Girls) is a 1978 American comedy film written and directed by Maura Smith and starring Jennifer Ashley, Bobby Di Cicco and Sue Lyon.

== Cast ==
- Sue Lyon as Lynn
- Jennifer Ashley as Jean
- Bobby Di Cicco as Tony
- J. J. Johnston as Butch
- Joe Mantegna as Chris
- Mike Nussbaum as Phil
- Audrie J. Neenan as Irate Lady
- Don DePollo as Pizza Man
- Steven Kampmann as Irate Man

== Production ==
According to Joe Mantegna, David Mamet wrote some scenes for the film which never made it in the final product and was paid $200 for his work.

The film was shot in Chicago.

== Reception ==
Richard Christiansen of the Chicago Tribune awarded the film one star and wrote, "But the movie as a whole is so loosely organized and so quirkily edited that none of it makes much sense; and its ending, with a joke involving the late Mayor Richard J. Daley, is sadly outdated."

Roger Ebert awarded the film one and a half stars.
