= Invisible Strangler =

- Directed by: John Florea; Arthur C. Pierce (uncredited); Gene Fowler Jr.
- Written by: Earle Lyon (story); Arthur C. Pierce (writer)
- Produced by: Fred Jordan (executive producer); Earle Lyon (producer)
- Starring: Robert Foxworth; Stefanie Powers; Elke Sommer; Sue Lyon; Leslie Parrish
- Cinematography: Alan Stensvold
- Edited by: Bud S. Isaacs
- Music by: Richard Hieronymus; Bill Marx; Alan Oldfield
- Release date: 1984
- Running time: 85 minutes (reedited 1984 version); 96 minutes (original 1978 version)
- Country: United States
- Language: English

Invisible Strangler is a 1984 American horror film directed by John Florea, an alternate cut of the 1978 film The Astral Factor, also known as The Astral Fiend, made in 1976.

The film stars Robert Foxworth, Stefanie Powers, Cesare Danova, Sue Lyon and Elke Sommer. Arthur C. Pierce wrote the screenplay and co-directed the film uncredited.

The film was originally released in 1978 as The Astral Factor aka The Astral Fiend. It was later re-edited into a new, shorter version entitled The Invisible Strangler and released on video in 1984. Invisible Strangler runs 85 minutes, about ten minutes shorter than The Astral Fiend, and most of the killer's dialogue lines during the murders were edited out, while new music and some entirely new scenes were added.

The film is available today on DVD as The Astral Fiend, which is the original uncut 1978 version of the film. It is on a double feature DVD with The Brain Machine (1972).

== Premise ==
Studying the paranormal allows a convicted strangler to make himself invisible to kill five women who testified against him at his trial.

== Cast ==
- Robert Foxworth as Lt. Charles Barrett
- Stefanie Powers as Candy Barrett
- Sue Lyon as Darlene DeLong
- Mark Slade as Detective Holt
- Leslie Parrish as Colleen Hudson
- Marianna Hill as Bambi Greer
- Elke Sommer as Chris Hartman
- Percy Rodrigues as Captain Wells
- Alex Dreier as Dr. Ulmer
- Rayford Barnes as Sgt. Archer
- Frederick Tully as Detective Sloan
- Frank Ashmore as Roger Sands
- Larry Golden as Detective Rouseau
- Renata Vaselle as Roxane Raymond
- Cesare Danova as Mario
- Eddie Firestone as Jacobs
- Bill Overton as Kingsley
- Carol Blalock as Sgt. Davis
- Jennifer Burton as Policewoman
- George Cheung as Jim, Medical Examiner
- Albert Cole as Cop in Alley
- John Hart as Harbormaster
- Robert F. Hoy as Harris
- Harry Lewis as Stage Manager
- Walter O. Miles as Fingerprint Man
- Queenie Smith as Darlene's Landlady
- Al Tipay as Miller
- Frank DeSal as Prison guard
- Troy Melton as Prison guard
- George Robotham as Cemetery Guard
- Jerry Wills as Cop
- Budd Bryan as Lead Dancer
- Bea Marie Busch as Dancer
- Bonnie Evans as Dancer
- Kathy Gale as Dancer
- Marcia Hewitt as Dancer
- Nancy Martin as Dancer
- Judy Van Wormer as Dancer

== Reception ==
A review at TV guide found the film "ridiculous".
