= The Flim-Flam Man =

1967 film by Irvin Kershner

- Theatrical release poster
- Directed by: Irvin Kershner
- Screenplay by: William Rose
- Based on: The Ballad of the Flim-Flam Man; 1965 novel by Guy Owen
- Produced by: Lawrence Turman
- Starring: George C. Scott; Sue Lyon; Michael Sarrazin; Harry Morgan; Alice Ghostley; Albert Salmi; Jack Albertson; Slim Pickens
- Cinematography: Charles Lang
- Edited by: Robert Swink
- Music by: Jerry Goldsmith
- Production company: 20th Century Fox
- Distributed by: 20th Century Fox
- Release date: August 22, 1967
- Running time: 104 minutes
- Country: United States
- Language: English
- Budget: $3,845,000
- Box office: $1.2 million (rentals)

The Flim-Flam Man (titled One Born Every Minute in some countries) is a 1967 American comedy film directed by Irvin Kershner, featuring George C. Scott, Michael Sarrazin, and Sue Lyon, based on the 1965 novel The Ballad of the Flim-Flam Man by Guy Owen. The movie has well-known character actors in supporting roles, including Jack Albertson, Slim Pickens, Strother Martin, Harry Morgan, and Albert Salmi.

The movie is set in the countryside and small towns of the American South, and it was filmed in the Anderson and Clark counties, Kentucky, area. It is also noted for its folksy musical score by composer Jerry Goldsmith.

== Plot ==
Mordecai C. Jones – a self-styled "M.B.S., C.S., D.D. — Master of Back-Stabbing, Cork-Screwing and Dirty-Dealing!" — is a drifting confidence trickster who makes his living defrauding people in the Southern United States using tricks such as rigged punchboards, playing cards, and found wallets. He befriends a young man named Curley, a deserter from the United States Army, and the two form a team to make money. In their escapades, they wreck a town during a hair-raising chase in their stolen car, steal a truck loaded with moonshine whiskey that they sell, break out of a sheriff's office, and discover a riverboat brothel. In the ending scene, Mordecai explains how he sees himself.

== Cast ==
- George C. Scott as Mordecai Jones
- Michael Sarrazin as Curley Treadaway
- Sue Lyon as Bonnie Lee Packard
- Harry Morgan as Sheriff Zebulon "Zeb" Slade
- Jack Albertson as Mr Packard
- Alice Ghostley as Mrs Packard
- Albert Salmi as Deputy Meshaw
- Slim Pickens as Jarvis Bates
- Strother Martin as Lovick
- George Mitchell as Tetter
- Woodrow Parfrey as Supermarket Manager

== Production ==
The movie was filmed on location for the most part in Central Kentucky during the second half of 1966. Exterior filming was done in a number of locations including near Frankfort, Midway, Winchester, Irvine, outside Georgetown, and several other places. Filming involving trains was done in conjunction with the Louisville and Nashville Railroad, and for a smaller part the Southern Railway System. Some interior filming (the inside of the Packard home and campsite sequences) was done on a sound stage specially built in Lexington, Kentucky at the Vaughn Tobacco Company warehouses.

Filming locations included:

- Paynes Depot, Kentucky: The opening sequence in which Curley meets Mordecai after getting thrown off a freight train was filmed here. The small railroad yard is now gone, but the roadside store seen in the background just before the title card still remains, as well as the base of the tank car station seen briefly in the film. A rented train from the Louisville and Nashville Railroad was used, headed by Alco RS-3 #136.
- Old Crow Distillery, Frankfort, Kentucky: The location of Curley's hideout in the overturned L&N caboose was filmed just north of the Old Crow Distillery on Glenns Creek Road. The concrete "railroad bridge" in this scene was actually an access road on the distillery grounds and had fake tracks laid across it that ended just out of frame. The caboose was placed in the creek by a local crane company, which would later move it to the banks of the nearby Kentucky River after filming. It washed away in a flood some time during the 1970s, but the concrete bridge remains. Other portions of the film shot here were those depicting the moonshine still and the sequence in which the green flatbed truck is stolen by Mordecai.
- Glenns Creek Road, Frankfort: The scene that introduces Sheriff Slade and Deputy Meshaw (in which Curley and Mordecai dive off the road) was filmed here about 1/2 mile north of the Old Crow distillery. The large tree in front of which Curley and Mordecai talk still stands as of 2014, although it is dead.
- Main Street, Midway, Kentucky: The establishing scene of the small town in which the Three-card Monte scam occurred was shot here. A railroad line runs directly through the center of town. The passenger train in the scene was the Chesapeake and Ohio's George Washington, which operated between Lexington and Louisville over the L&N Railroad via trackage rights.
- Old Frankfort Pike, Lexington, Kentucky: The Packard farm is located here. As of 2014, the house exterior is mostly unchanged, with some minor remodeling. No interior filming was made at this location as the interior of the house was a sound stage.
- Duckers, Kentucky: The country store where Sheriff Slade and Deputy Meshaw first see the red convertible "borrowed" by Mordecai is located here. The store still stands but is now a private residence with the "porch" on which the sheriff sat now enclosed.
- Clifton Road, Versailles, Kentucky: This is the place where Curley first notices that the police are following the convertible. The wooden house by which the police car passes no longer exists.
- Court Street, Lawrenceburg, Kentucky: The scene in which the convertible narrowly misses a Southern Railway locomotive and boxcar at a grade crossing was filmed here. The crossing still exists and is now Norfolk Southern territory.
- Main Street, Lawrenceburg: The sequence during the car chase in which the convertible destroys a town was filmed here, and two alleys split off either side of it. Most of the structures in this sequence remain as of 2014, including the tobacco warehouse where the convertible detoured through the loading dock. The alley where the convertible ran through Christmas merchandise also still exists, but the brick building has been demolished and replaced by a modern bank. The scam in which Mordecai and Curley sell bourbon-cut moonshine to a storekeeper was also filmed in Lawrenceburg, directly behind the former offices of the Anderson County Observer newspaper. The back of this building is no longer accessible because of remodeling.
- Main Street, Irvine, Kentucky: The near ending of the car chase in which the convertible and sheriff's car run around an A&P grocery store and across a green highway bridge was filmed here.
- Corner of Lemons Mill and Newtown Pike, Georgetown, Kentucky: The country store where the "peg game" scam took place was filmed here. The bridge where Curley is first dropped off at the beginning of the scene was removed in a road realignment during 2001. As of 2014, the buildings remain, but in a state of disrepair.
- Valley View Ferry, Tates Creek Road, Valley View, Kentucky: The ferry operates on Tates Creek Road on the Madison County and Fayette County borders. The ferry still operates as of 2021, although the barge and power unit have been replaced several times since the making of the film. The large steel towers seen in the background (part of an abandoned railroad bridge) can still be seen.
- Main Street, Winchester, Kentucky: The "pigeon drop" sequence with Slim Pickens was filmed here. The building that Slim Pickens first exits was the St. George Hotel and was located at the corner of Washington Street and Main. This has since been demolished, and the whole block is now occupied by the Winchester Post Office. The scene in the alley where the pigeon drop scam occurred was behind the Sphar Feed Company building on North Main Street. Today, the building is owned by the City of Winchester and is on the National Register of Historic Places. Plans call for rehabilitating the warehouse and repurposing it to serve as Winchester's welcome center and professional office space.
- Anderson County Courthouse, Lawrenceburg: The film's last act was filmed inside and outside the courthouse. The exterior of the building is mostly unchanged as of 2014, but the interior setup has been remodeled somewhat. The sheriff's office on the front ground floor no longer exists.
- Railroad filming (the truck on rails sequence) was done on several rail lines including the Louisville and Nashville "Old Road" line between Lexington and Frankfort, and possibly the Frankfort and Cincinnati Railroad. The scene in which the truck almost collides with an L&N freight train was filmed on the L&N Hermitage Branch, which served the Old Crow Distillery outside Frankfort.

== Awards ==
William Rose was nominated for the Best American Comedy Writing award given by the Writers Guild of America.

== Reception ==
Bosley Crowther of The New York Times had kind words for Morgan's, Salmi's, and Pickens's characterizations, and praised the "slambang automobile chase," but wrote that the film could not "command and sustain a true farce style," a failing for which he primarily blamed the casting of George C. Scott:

Mr. Scott is not up to the role. He is a serious character actor trying to be a lovable old rogue. He is a fierce dramatic firebrand trying to be a frisky scamp. Made up with flowing hair and eyebrows to look a lot like a latter-day Fredric March, with occasional glances over his spectacles and smackings of his lips to remind one of Claude Rains, he plays this cornball con man skipping about through the South with all sorts of actorish frills and flutters that haven't a shred of art in them. He is not an expansive comic character, even remotely in a class with Mr. Fields, nor is he a fairly fascinating contriver of ordinary farce. He is an obvious performer on whom the make-up shows. And I shudder to try to tell you how affected and artificial is his voice.

Roger Ebert of the Chicago Sun-Times said: "The movie was shot on location, largely in Kentucky, and it gains a real feeling of authenticity. These are real crossroads stores and real wide-eyed rednecks, watching the city slicker shuffle the cards. And a lot of the episodes are hilarious. I announced some time ago, in connection with Casino Royale (1967) I think, that chase scenes had just about had it as laugh-getters in the movies. Wrong again. There is a chase scene in this one that's a classic. The flim-flam man, dressed as a minister, and his pupil, dressed as an accident victim, steal a car and lead the sheriff on a brilliantly photographed chase down the sidewalks and through the watermelon wagons of the South. ... There are also some nicely directed scenes in which Scott gradually overcomes the suspicions of his victims, wins their confidence, allows his straight man to win a few bucks and then, oh, so innocently asks a tobacco farmer if he'd care to speculate as to which card was the queen."

=== Box office ===
According to Fox records, the film needed to earn $6,400,000 in rentals to break even and made $3,525,000, meaning it incurred a loss.

== See also ==
- List of American films of 1967
