= Orie =

Orie, also spelled Orrie, is a unisex given name, nickname and surname which may refer to:

== People ==
=== Given name or nickname ===
- Orest Orie Amodeo (1921–1998), American woodwind musician, a member of the Lawrence Welk orchestra
- Orie Arntzen (1909–1970), American Major League Baseball pitcher in 1943
- Orest Banach (born 1948), American former soccer goalkeeper
- Orie Latham Hatcher (1868–1946), American feminist educational reformer
- Orrie Hitt (1916–1975), American erotica and crime novelist
- Orie Kerlin (1891–1974), American baseball player in 1915
- Orie Lemon (born 1987), American former National Football League player
- Orie Loucks (1931–2016), Canadian ecologist
- Orizaba Orrie Perry (1888–1950), Australian cinematographer
- Orie Leon Phillips (1885–1974), United States circuit judge
- Orie Rogo Manduli (1948–2021), Kenyan diplomat, women's activist, journalist and 1964 Miss Kenya, née Mary Slessor Orie Rogo
- Orie Steele (1887–1960), American motorcycle hillclimbing racer
- Orie S. Ware (1882–1974), American politician

=== Stage name ===
- Orie Kimoto, stage name of Japanese actress Naoko Yabuta

=== Surname ===
- Alphons Orie (born 1947), Dutch judge
- Delicious Orie (born 1997), British former professional boxer
- Eric Orie (born 1968), Dutch football manager
- Jane Orie (born 1961), American politician and attorney
- Kevin Orie (born 1972), American former Major League Baseball player
- Marvin Orie (born 1993), South African rugby union footballer

== Fictional characters ==
- Orrie Cather, a Nero Wolfe supporting character
