= Crash! =

- Directed by: Charles Band
- Written by: Marc Marais
- Starring: José Ferrer; Sue Lyon; John Ericson; Leslie Parrish; John Carradine
- Cinematography: Andrew Davis
- Edited by: Harry Keramidas
- Music by: Andrew Belling
- Distributed by: Group 1 International Distribution Organization Ltd.
- Release date: January 1977
- Running time: 85 minutes
- Country: United States
- Language: English

Crash! is a 1977 film directed by Charles Band. It starred José Ferrer, Sue Lyon, John Ericson, Leslie Parrish, John Carradine and Reggie Nalder.

== Synopsis ==
Jealous invalid husband (Ferrer) tries to kill sexy blond wife (Lyon), who uses occult powers and devices to try to kill him.

== Cast ==
- José Ferrer as Marc Denne
- Sue Lyon as Kim Denne
- John Ericson as Dr. Gregg Martin
- Leslie Parrish as Kathy Logan
- John Carradine as Social Anthropology Professor Dr. Wesley Edwards
- Jerome Guardino as Lieutenant Pegler
- Paul Dubov as Dr. Cross
- Reggie Nalder as Man At Swap

== Production ==
The film had the working title "The Transfusion" before it was changed to "Crash!".

== Reception ==
DreadCentral gave it 3 out of 5.

== Home media ==
The film was released on DVD in Germany. In 2015, the film was released on DVD in the USA via Band's Full Moon Pictures.
