= Hot Rod (1979 film) =

1979 film by George Armitage

- Genre: Drama
- Written by: George Armitage
- Directed by: George Armitage
- Starring: Gregg Henry; Pernell Roberts; Robin Mattson; Grant Goodeve
- Music by: Michael Simpson
- Country of origin: United States
- Original language: English

Production
- Producer: Sam Manners
- Production locations: Alviso, California; Calistoga, Napa Valley, California; Baylands Raceway Park - 44333 Christy Lane, Fremont, California
- Cinematography: Andrew Davis
- Editors: William Neel; Carroll Sax
- Camera setup: Panavision Cameras and Lenses
- Running time: 100 minutes
- Production companies: ABC Circle Films

Original release
- Network: ABC
- Release: May 25, 1979

Hot Rod is a 1979 American made-for-television drama film directed by George Armitage and starring Gregg Henry and Pernell Roberts.

== Plot ==
A freewheeling drag racer enters a local championship meet and finds himself head-to-head with the tyrannical town boss who has already arranged for his own son to win.

== Cast ==
- Gregg Henry as Brian Edison
- Pernell Roberts as Sheriff Marsden
- Robin Mattson as Jenny
- Grant Goodeve as Sonny Munn
- Robert Culp as T.L. Munn
- Royce D. Applegate as Johnny Hurricane
- Topo Swope as Sprout
- Ed Begley Jr. as Clay
- Bruce M. Fischer as Cannonball
- Erik Holland as Barry Hogue
- Julie Gibson as Violet

== Production ==
The film was made by ABC Circle, a division of ABC. Armitage says they just had a title, Hot Rod. In an interview with Nick Pinkerton, George Armitage stated, "And I went over there and talked to them, they said: 'Yeah, go ahead.' It was a street racer movie, that’s what I came up with, and we shot that in 15 days—TV was not generous with their time. We shot that up in Northern California, in Calistoga, wine country, and at the Fremont drag way."

Armitage says the story is based on the life of a friend of his, Bob Edlefsen, who was a top mechanic and with whom Armitage used to race.

Armitage used a number of actors who were under contract to ABC at the time.
