= Arsenic and Old Lace (1969 film) =

1969 television film

- Genre: Black comedy
- Based on: Arsenic and Old Lace; 1941 play by Joseph Kesselring
- Screenplay by: Luther Davis
- Directed by: Robert Scheerer
- Starring: Helen Hayes; Bob Crane; Lillian Gish; Fred Gwynne; Sue Lyon; Jack Gilford; David Wayne
- Country of origin: United States
- Original language: English

Production
- Producers: Luther Davis; Robert Hartung
- Cinematography: Andy Balint (video); Joe Herbst (video); Everett Melosh (lighting director)
- Editors: Nick Mazur (videotape editor); Charles Stephensen (videotape editor)
- Running time: 90 minutes

Original release
- Network: ABC
- Release: April 2, 1969

Arsenic & Old Lace is a 1969 American television film directed by Robert Scheerer and starring Helen Hayes, Lillian Gish, Bob Crane, Fred Gwynne, Sue Lyon, Jack Gilford and David Wayne. It is an adaptation of Joseph Kesselring's 1941 play Arsenic and Old Lace. The production was shot on color videotape before a live audience. Inserts of outside action that were shot on film were added to the production for the April 2, 1969 broadcast.

The story is a black comedy in which drama critic Mortimer Brewster (Crane) discovers that his two elderly spinster aunts Abby and Martha (Hayes and Gish, respectively), who live in a house in Brooklyn, have been poisoning their lonely male guests.

Fred Gwynne of Munsters fame played Jonathan Brewster, the role originated on Broadway by Boris Karloff, the star of the 1931 horror classic Frankenstein. Karloff was famous for playing Frankenstein's monster, on which Gwynne's character of Herman Munster was modeled. Jonathan Brewster is described by the other characters as resembling Karloff, who had played the role on television once before, in a 1955 adaptation for the CBS anthology series The Best of Broadway.

The 1969 version was updated to contemporary times by having Crane's character meet Sue Lyon in a discotheque at the beginning.

== Cast ==
Actor	Role
Helen Hayes	Abby Brewster
Bob Crane	Mortimer Brewster
Lillian Gish	Martha Brewster
Fred Gwynne	Jonathan Brewster
Sue Lyon	Elaine Dodd
David Wayne	Teddy Brewster
Jack Gilford	Dr. Jonas Salk
Bob Dishy	Officer Sampson
Richard Deacon	Mr. Benner, the family lawyer
Billy De Wolfe	Mr. Witherspoon, the superintendent of Happydale

== Reception ==
The 1969 televised version of Arsenic & Old Lace was not well received by critics. It is not available on any medium, other than a bootleg 16mm black and white copy posted on YouTube.com.
