= Checkered Flag (film) =

1990 film by John Glen

- Screenplay by: E.F. Wallengren; Jason Brett
- Story by: Clayton Frohman; E.F. Wallengren
- Directed by: John Glen; Michael Levine
- Starring: Billy Campbell; Rob Estes; Amanda Wyss; Carrie Hamilton; Adam Philipson; Christian Bocher; Robert Forster; Pernell Roberts
- Music by: Kevin Klingler
- Original language: English

Production
- Producer: James Margellos
- Cinematography: William A. Fraker
- Editors: Bernard Gribble; Robert Sinise
- Running time: 95 minutes
- Production company: New World Pictures

Original release
- Network: ABC
- Release: July 23, 1990

Checkered Flag is a 1990 made-for-television sports film directed by John Glen and Michael Levine.

== Plot ==
Race car driver Mike Reardon and mechanic Tommy Trehearn are the best of friends whose friendship is damaged when Reardon's girlfriend Chris Baird ends up falling for Trehearn. Years later, Trehearn and Chris are married with children and move to Arizona when Trehearn is selected to be a mechanic for a new racing team, of which Reardon also happens to be a part.

== Cast ==
- Billy Campbell as Tommy Trehearn
- Rob Estes as Mike Reardon
- Amanda Wyss as Chris Baird Trehearn
- Adam Philipson as Sal
- Christian Bocher as Alan Bondell
- Robert Forster as Jack Cotton
- Pernell Roberts as Andrew Valiant
- Carrie Hamilton as Alex Cross
- Leilani Sarelle as Jerri Simpson
- Guy Boyd as J.D. Nelson

== Production and release ==
The film was produced as a TV pilot but was not picked up for a series. Sometime after its TV premiere, it was released on videocassette in Canada by Malofilm and in 1993 in the United States by Rhino Home Video.
