= Guy Owen (novelist) =

American writer

Guy Owen (February 24, 1925 – July 25, 1981) was a professor of English who produced many different types of literary works.

== Career ==
He was born in Clarkton, Bladen County, North Carolina, and grew up on a tobacco farm. Although his college education was interrupted by three years as an Army private in Europe during World War II, he ultimately earned his bachelor's, master's, and doctoral degrees at the University of North Carolina at Chapel Hill. Although he never returned there to live, his boyhood in the Cape Fear region during the Great Depression, spent accompanying his grandfather to auctions and clerking at his father's general store, informed his writing, providing him with a lifetime of material for his fiction and poetry.

In the years between earning his M.A. and his Ph.D., Owen taught briefly at Davidson College and Elon College. During a four-year stint as an associate professor at Stetson University in Florida, he published his first poetry collection, and founded Impetus, the literary magazine which would evolve into the Southern Poetry Review. In 1960, he published his first novel, Season of Fear, a Depression-era story set in a rural community. The story of one man's struggle between religion and sex was critically well received, but its seriousness left Owen ready to write some lighter fiction. The Ballad of the Flim-Flam Man follows the comic adventures of an aging confidence man and his young AWOL sidekick in a thinly fictionalized Bladen County. Mordecai Jones and the guitar playing Curley Treadaway were to become two of Owen's favorite characters. The book was made into a movie in 1967 (The Flim-Flam Man) starring George C. Scott and Michael Sarrazin, and the characters reappeared in two more books to "con" the greedy and gullible who only get what they deserve. The 1970 novel Journey for Joedel won the Sir Walter Raleigh Award for best work of fiction by a North Carolinian.

In 1962, Owen took a position at North Carolina State University. He continued over the years to publish stories and poems. His collection The White Stallion and Other Poems won a Roanoke-Chowan cup for poetry by a North Carolina poet. He co-edited several anthologies of state and regional verse, lectured and conducted workshops across the state for writers of all levels, participated in the "poetry in the schools" program, and directed the North Carolina Poetry Circuit, which brought together poets and college students.

As a writer and teacher of writing, Guy Owen adhered to two principles. The first was specificity: "Never write 'flower': write 'rose' or 'marigold' or 'chrysanthemum.'" The second was "Make your reader comfortable," meaning that a writer should give enough information in a clear style to enable the reader to easily enter the writer's world. Owen's many honors include a Bread Loaf Scholarship, the Henry H. Bellamann Foundation Award, a Yaddo Fellowship, and the 1971 gold medallion North Carolina Award for Literature.

Owen died of liver cancer in Rex Hospital in Raleigh, North Carolina, at the age of 56.

== Books and editorships ==
- The Ballad of the Flim-Flam Man. New York: Macmillan, 1965.
- Cape Fear Country, and Other Poems. Lake Como, Florida: New Athenaeum Press, 1958.
- Contemporary Poetry of North Carolina. Edited with Mary C. Williams. Winston-Salem: John F. Blair, 1977.
- The Flim-Flam Man & the Apprentice Grifter. New York: Crown Publishers, 1972.
- Journey for Joedel. New York: Crown. 1970.
- Modern American Poetry: Essays in Criticism. DeLand, Florida: Everett/Edwards, 1972.
- New Southern Poets: Selected Poems from Southern Poetry Review. Edited with Mary C. Williams. Chapel Hill: University of North Carolina Press, 1974.
- Season of Fear. New York: Random House, 1960.
- Southern Poetry Review. Edited 1958–1977.
- Southern Poetry Review: A Decade of Poems. Editor. Raleigh: Southern Poetry Review Press, 1969.
- The White Stallion and Other Poems. Winston-Salem: John F. Blair, 1969.

Owen has had appearances in periodicals, including New East, Southern Literary Journal, Southern World, Tar Heel, and numerous poetry journals.
