= Orrie Hitt =

American novelist

Orrie Edwin Hitt
- Born: October 27, 1916; Colchester, New York, U.S.
- Died: December 8, 1975 (aged 59); Montrose, New York, U.S.
- Occupations: Novelist, writer
- Writing career
- Pen name: Kay Addams, Joe Black, Roger Normandie, Charles Verne & Nicky Weaver
- Period: 1953–1970
- Genres: Mid-Century Erotica, Crime fiction

Orrie Hitt (October 27, 1916 – December 8, 1975) was a prolific American author of over 150 books, mostly mid-century erotica, but including some crime novels early in his career. It has been said he wrote a book every two weeks at the prime of his career, sitting at his dining room table, fueled by large glasses of iced coffee and cigarettes. His first two books, I'll Call Every Monday and Love in the Arctic were hardcover books published by Red Lantern, but his career would ultimately be made writing paperback originals.

As a paperback writer, many of his books were written as "work for hire" and the copyright held by the publishing company who, anticipating a very short shelf life, never bothered to renew the copyright or return the rights to the author. The fact that all of his books, prior to 1964, are in the public domain has been beneficial to the legacy of Orrie Hitt, in that it has made them more readily available to contemporary readers.

Original Orrie Hitt paperbacks are collectible not only among aficionados of 1950s and 1960s cover art, but also among readers of mid-century erotica and crime novels, who find them superior to those of other "hack" writers of the time.

== Selected bibliography ==
=== Novels as by Orrie Hitt ===
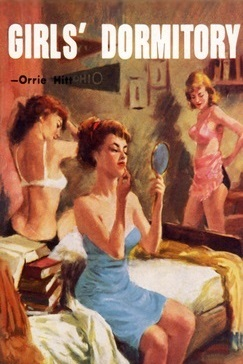
Cover of Girls' Dormitory by Orrie Hitt, 1958. Illustration by Clement Micarelli.

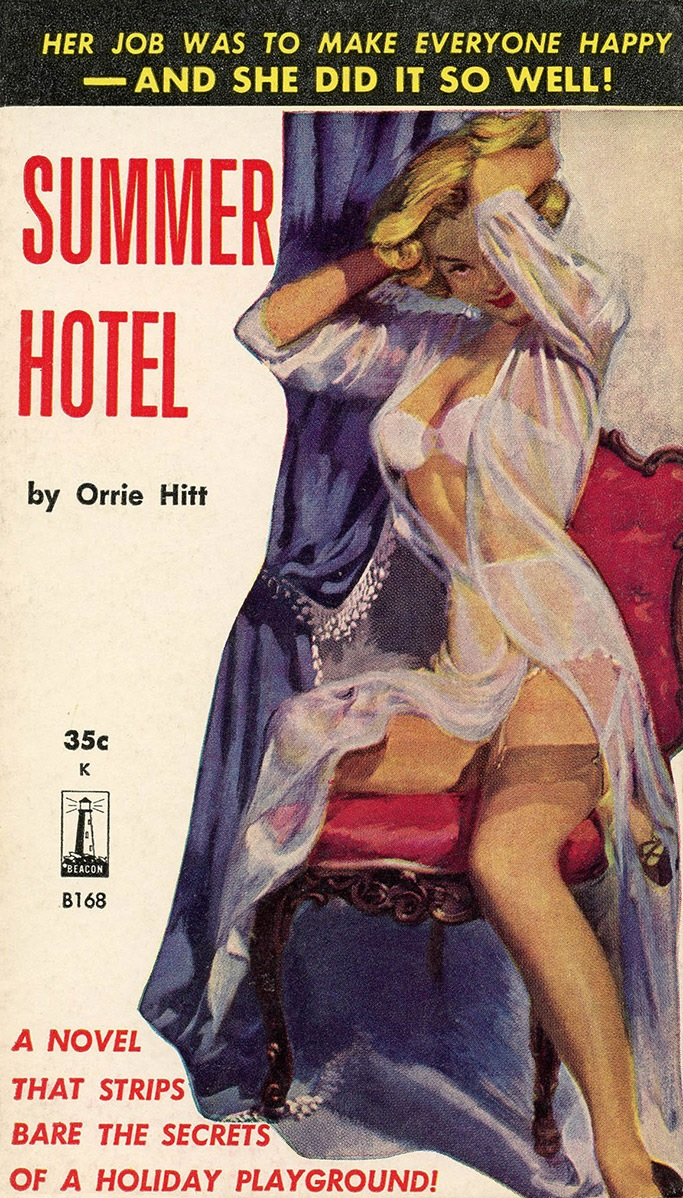
Summer Hotel by Orrie Hitt - Cover artist Ray App

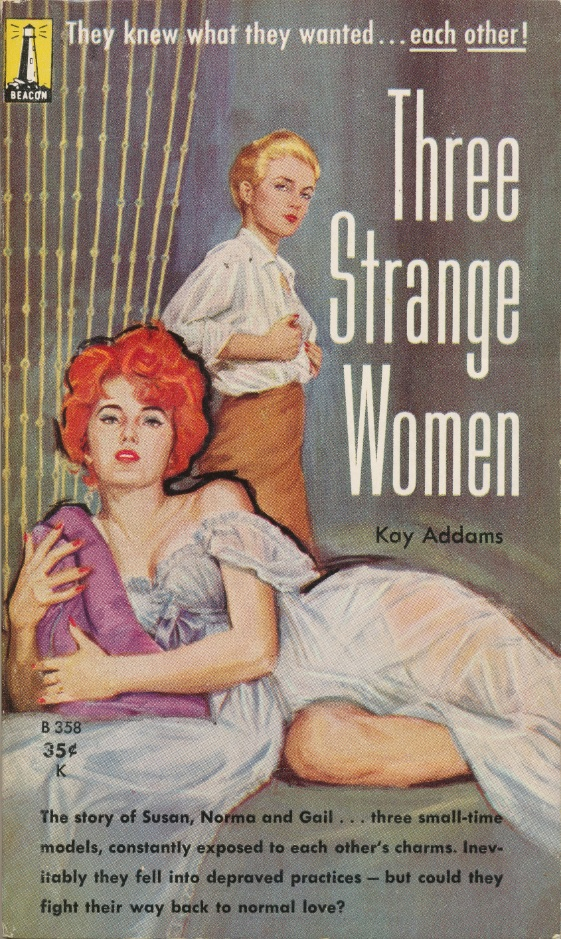
Cover of Three Strange Women (1960) by Orrie Hitt writing as Kay Addams

Year in parentheses is that of initial publication followed by the year of any reprint under a different title, if any.

- I'll Call Every Monday (1953)
- Love in the Arctic (1953)
- Leased (with Jack Woodford) (1954, 1958 revised by Hitt & retitled Trapped as by Orrie Hitt)
- Cabin Fever (1954, 1959 as Tawny, 1974 as Lovers at Night)
- She Got What She Wanted (1954)
- Shabby Street (1954)
- Teaser (1956)
- Unfaithful Wives (1956)
- The Web of Evil as by Roger Normandie (1957)
- The Sucker (1957)
- Nudist Camp (1957)
- Pushover (1957)
- The Promoter (1957)
- Ladies' Man (1957)
- Dolls and Dues (1957)
- Trailer Tramp (1957)
- Devil in the Flesh (1957, 1960 as Sins of Flesh)
- Ellie's Shack (1958)
- Suburban Wife (1958)
- Summer Hotel (1958)
- Wild Oats (1958)
- Affairs of a Beauty Queen (1958)
- Call South 3300: Ask for Molly! (1958)
- Burlesque Girl (1958)
- Girl's Dormitory (1958)
- Woman Hunt (1958)
- Hot Cargo (1958)
- The Cheat (1958)
- Rotten to the Core (1958)
- Love Princess (1958)
- Hotel Women (1958)
- Hotel Confidential (1958)
- Sheba (1959)
- The Widow (1959)
- Add Flesh to the Fire (1959)
- Private Club (1959)
- Carnival Girl (1959)
- The Peeper (1959, 1973 as Twisted Passion)
- Too Hot to Handle (1959)
- Sin Doll (1959, 1973 as The Excesses of Cherry)
- Ex-Virgin (1959, 1969 as Made for Man)
- Suburban Sin (1959)
- Pleasure Ground (1959, 1961)
- Affair With Lucy (1959, 1961 as Married Mistress)
- Girl of the Streets (1959)
- Summer Romance (1959)
- As Bad as They Come (1959, 1962 as Mail Order Sex)
- Hotel Woman (1959, 1960 as Hotel Hostess)
- Wayward Girl (1960)
- The Torrid Teens (1960)
- From Door to Door (1960)
- Motel Girls (1960)
- Tell Them Anything (1960)
- Call Me Bad (1960)
- Untamed Lust (1960)
- Never Cheat Alone (1960)
- The Lady is a Lush (1960)
- Sexurbia County (1960)
- Tramp Wife (1960)
- Hotel Girl (1960)
- Lonely Flesh (1960, 1963 as Lola)
- Suburban Interlude (1960)
- The Cheaters (1960)
- A Doctor and His Mistress (1960)
- Two of a Kind (1960)
- I Prowl by Night (1961)
- Dirt Farm (1961, 1968 as The Hired Man)
- Summer of Sin (1961)
- Four Women (1961)
- The Love Season (1961)
- Frigid Wife (1961)
- Virgins No More (1961)
- Party Doll (1961)
- Strange Longing (1961, 1963 as Female Doctor)
- Man's Nurse (1961)
- Hot Blood (1961)
- Diploma Dolls (1961)
- Dark Passions (1961)
- Twisted Lovers (1961)
- Suburban Trap (1961)
- Carnival Honey (1961)
- Wild Lovers (1961)
- Easy Women! (1961, 1963 as Inflamed Dames, 1964 as Love Seekers, 1965 as Jenkins' Lovers)
- Shocking Mistress! (1961)
- Peeping Tom (1961)
- Love Thief (1962)
- Dial "M" for Man (1962)
- Torrid Cheat (1962)
- Twin Beds (1962)
- Naked Model (1962)
- Libby Sin (1962)
- Passion Street (1962)
- Bad Wife (1962)
- Passion Hostess (1962)
- Bold Affair (1962)
- Campus Tramp (1962)
- The Naked Flesh (1962)
- Violent Sinners (1962)
- Love Slave (1962)
- Frustrated Females! (1962, 1963 as I Need a Man!)
- Warped Woman (1962, 1963 as Taboo Thrills, 1964 as Wilma's Wants)
- Abnormal Norma (1962)
- Bed Crazy (1962, 1964 as Perverted Doctors)
- Man-Hungry Female (1962, 1964 as More! More! More!)
- Carnival Sin/Playpet (1962)
- Torrid Wench (1963)
- Strip Alley (1963)
- Nude Doll (1963)
- Loose Women (1963)
- An American Sodom (1963)
- Male Lover (Gaslight, 1964)
- Passion Pool (1964)
- The Color of Lust (1964)
- The Passion Hunters (1964, 1966 as This Wild Desire)
- Lust Prowl (1964)
- The Love Seekers (1964)
- The Tavern (1966)
- Woman's Ward (1966)
- While the City Sins (1967)
- The Sex Pros (1968, in the UK as Cindy)
- Panda Bear Passion (1968)
- Nude Model (1970)

== Sources ==
- Books Are Everything! #21 March 1992
- Simon & Schuster Author Page
- "'Sometimes the whole world stinks'" – Orrie Hitt, the King of Tri-State Sleaze, Apocalypse Confidential
- "Orrie Hitt, the Shakespeare of Shabby Street"
- "The Sleazy Side of the Street - Guest Blog by Brian Ritt", Rough Edges by James Reasoner]
- GoodReads Author Page
- Find a Grave
- Pulp fiction, Port Jervis style, Times Herald-Record
