= Pernell Roberts =

American actor (1928–2010)

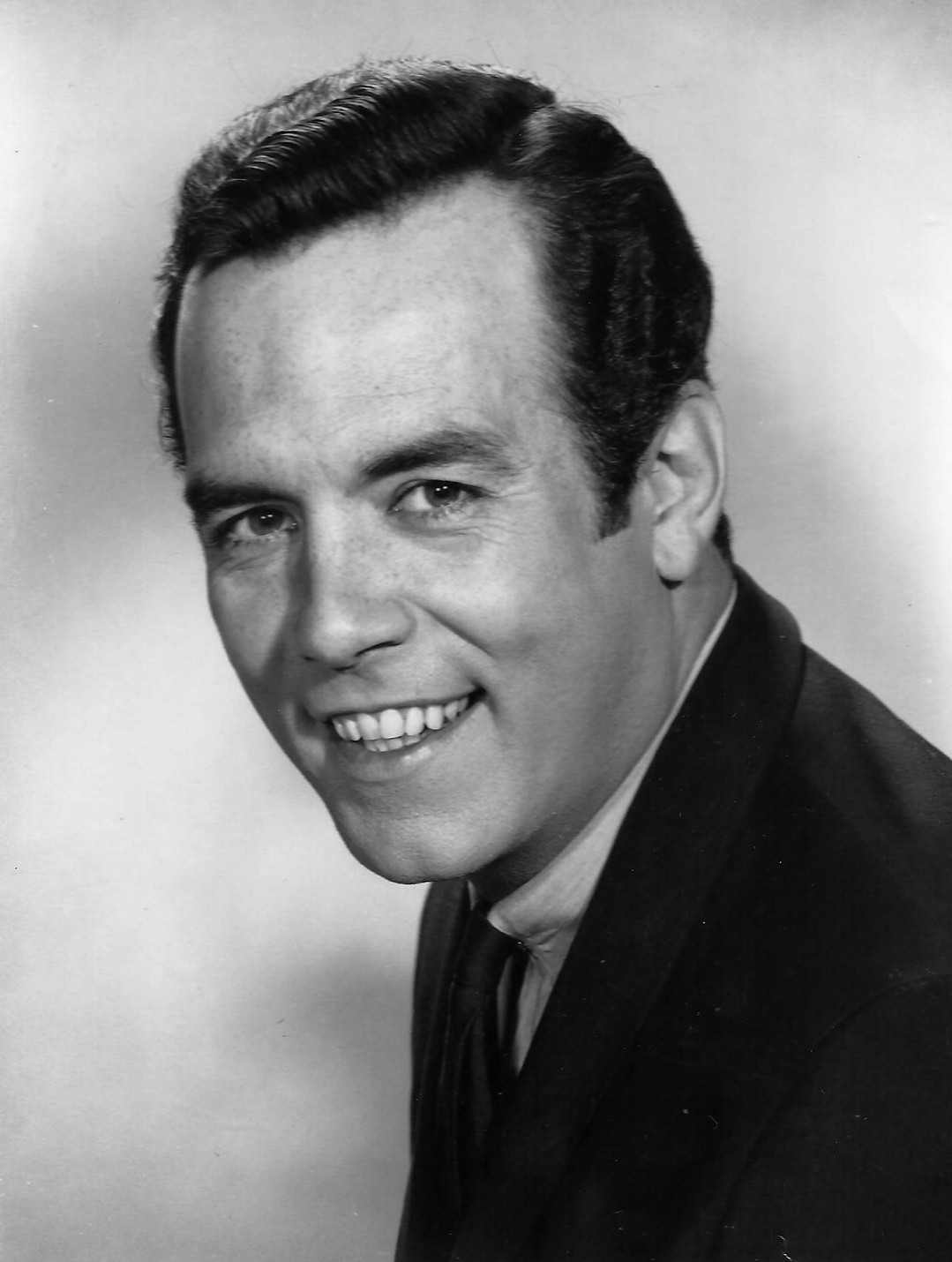
- Roberts in 1965
- Born: Pernell Elven Roberts Jr. May 18, 1928; Waycross, Georgia, U.S.
- Died: January 24, 2010 (aged 81); Malibu, California, U.S.
- Occupations: Actor; singer; activist
- Years active: 1949–2001
- Spouses: Vera Mowry (m. 1951; div. 1959) Judith LeBrecque (m. 1962; div. 1971) Kara Knack (m. 1972; div. 1996) Eleanor Criswell (m. 1997)
- Children: 1

Pernell Elven Roberts Jr. (May 18, 1928 – January 24, 2010) was an American stage, film, and television actor, activist, and singer. In addition to guest-starring in over 60 television series, he was best known for his roles as Ben Cartwright's eldest son Adam Cartwright on the Western television series Bonanza (1959–1965), and as chief surgeon John McIntyre, the title character on Trapper John, M.D. (1979–1986).

Roberts was also known for his lifelong activism, which included participation in the Selma to Montgomery marches in 1965 and pressuring NBC to refrain from hiring white actors to portray non-white characters.

== Early life ==
Roberts was born on May 18, 1928, in Waycross, Georgia, the only child of Pernell Elven Roberts Sr., a Dr Pepper salesman, and Minnie (Betty) Myrtle Morgan Roberts. During his high-school years, Pernell played the horn, acted in school and church plays, and sang in local USO shows. He attended, but did not graduate from, Georgia Tech. Enlisting in 1946, he served for two years in the United States Marine Corps. He played the tuba and horn in the Marine Corps Band, and he was also skilled at playing the sousaphone and percussion. He later attended, also without graduating, the University of Maryland, where he had his first exposure to acting in classical theatre. He appeared in four productions while a student, including Othello and Antigone, but left school to act in summer stock.

== Professional theatre ==
In 1949, he made his professional stage debut with Moss Hart and Kitty Carlisle in The Man Who Came to Dinner at the Olney Theatre in Olney, Maryland. Later, he spent eight weeks at the Bryn Mawr College Theatre in Philadelphia, portraying Dan in Emlyn Williams's Night Must Fall and Alfred Doolittle in Bernard Shaw's Pygmalion.

In 1952, Roberts moved to New York City, where he appeared first off-Broadway in one-act operas and ballets with the North American Lyric Theatre, with the Shakespearewrights, at the Equity Library Theatre, and later on Broadway with performances in Tonight in Samarkand (also in Washington, DC), The Lovers opposite Joanne Woodward, and A Clearing in the Woods with Robert Culp and Kim Stanley. He won a Drama Desk Award in 1956 for his performance in an off-Broadway rendition of Macbeth, which was followed by the role of Mercutio in Romeo and Juliet. He performed in Twelfth Night, The Merchant of Venice, Dr. Faustus, and The Taming of the Shrew at the American Shakespeare Festival, and later on Broadway. He performed in St. Joan (1954, Cleveland), Down in the Valley (at the Provincetown Playhouse), The Duchess of Malfi, Measure for Measure, and King John.

In 1956, Roberts returned to the Olney Theatre, starring opposite Jan Farrand in Much Ado About Nothing with the Players, Inc. group. The same year, Roberts made his television debut in the "Shadow of Suspicion" episode of Kraft Television Theatre, followed by guest-starring roles in Whirlybirds, Gunsmoke, Cimarron City, Buckskin, Sugarfoot, and Cheyenne.

== Transition to film and television ==
Roberts signed a contract with Columbia Pictures in 1957, and made his film debut a year later as one of Burl Ives's contentious sons in Desire Under the Elms (1958). The film was nominated for an Academy Award for Best Cinematography. He also landed a character role in The Sheepman (1958), opposite Glenn Ford and Shirley MacLaine, and continued to guest-star on television shows such as episodes of Shirley Temple Storybook Theater ("The Emperor's New Clothes", "Rumplestiltskin", "The Sleeping Beauty", and "Hiawatha"), the live-broadcast Matinee Theater, where he starred again in Shakespeare's Much Ado About Nothing, and in The Heart's Desire. This was followed by appearances in Trackdown, Buckskin, and episodes of Zane Grey Theatre. Roberts guest-starred as Captain Jacques Chavez on the NBC adventure series Northwest Passage (1958). He appeared with fellow guest star Fay Spain in the 1958 episode "Pick Up the Gun" of Tombstone Territory and played the lead villain Travis in the 31st episode ("Hey Boy's Revenge") of Have Gun – Will Travel, portraying a killer boss exploiter of Chinese coolie laborers. The episode aired 4/11/1958.

In 1959, Roberts guest-starred in episodes of General Electric Theater, Cimarron City, Sugarfoot, Lawman, One Step Beyond, Bronco, 77 Sunset Strip, and The Detectives. Also in 1959, he co-starred in the film Ride Lonesome. "If Roberts felt typecast by Westerns, they also provided his finest role in this film, arguably the greatest of the B-movies starring Randolph Scott and directed by Budd Boetticher. Roberts recognized the film's classic structure; his engaging outlaw, Sam Boone, counterpoints Scott's granite-faced Ben Brigade, maintaining the tension of whether they will work together or clash. He similarly played off James Coburn, who was making his film debut as Boone's quiet sidekick, Whit." The same year, he was cast in Bonanza.

=== Bonanza ===
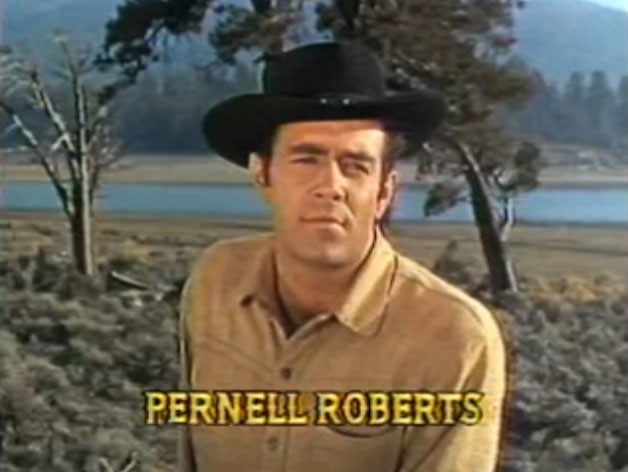
As Adam in the opening credits

Roberts played Ben Cartwright's urbane eldest son Adam, in the Western television series Bonanza. Unlike his brothers, Adam was a university-educated architectural engineer.

Roberts, having largely been "a stage actor, accustomed as he was to a rigorous diet of the classics" and to freely move about from part to part, found the "transition to a television series", playing the same character, "without costume changes", a difficult one. "It was perhaps not surprising that, despite enormous success, he left Bonanza after the 1964–65 season, criticizing the show's simple-minded content and lack of minority actors ...". It particularly distressed him that his character, a man in his 30s, had to defer continually to the wishes of his widowed father, and he reportedly disliked the series itself, calling it "junk" television and accusing NBC of "perpetuating banality and contributing to the dehumanization of the industry." The equally self-critical Roberts ("I guess I'll never be satisfied with my own work"), "had long disdained the medium's commercialization of his craft and its mass-production, assembly-line mindset." Frustrated with Bonanza and angry, he told a reporter in 1965, "I feel I'm an aristocrat in my field of endeavor. My being part of Bonanza was like Isaac Stern sitting in with Lawrence Welk".

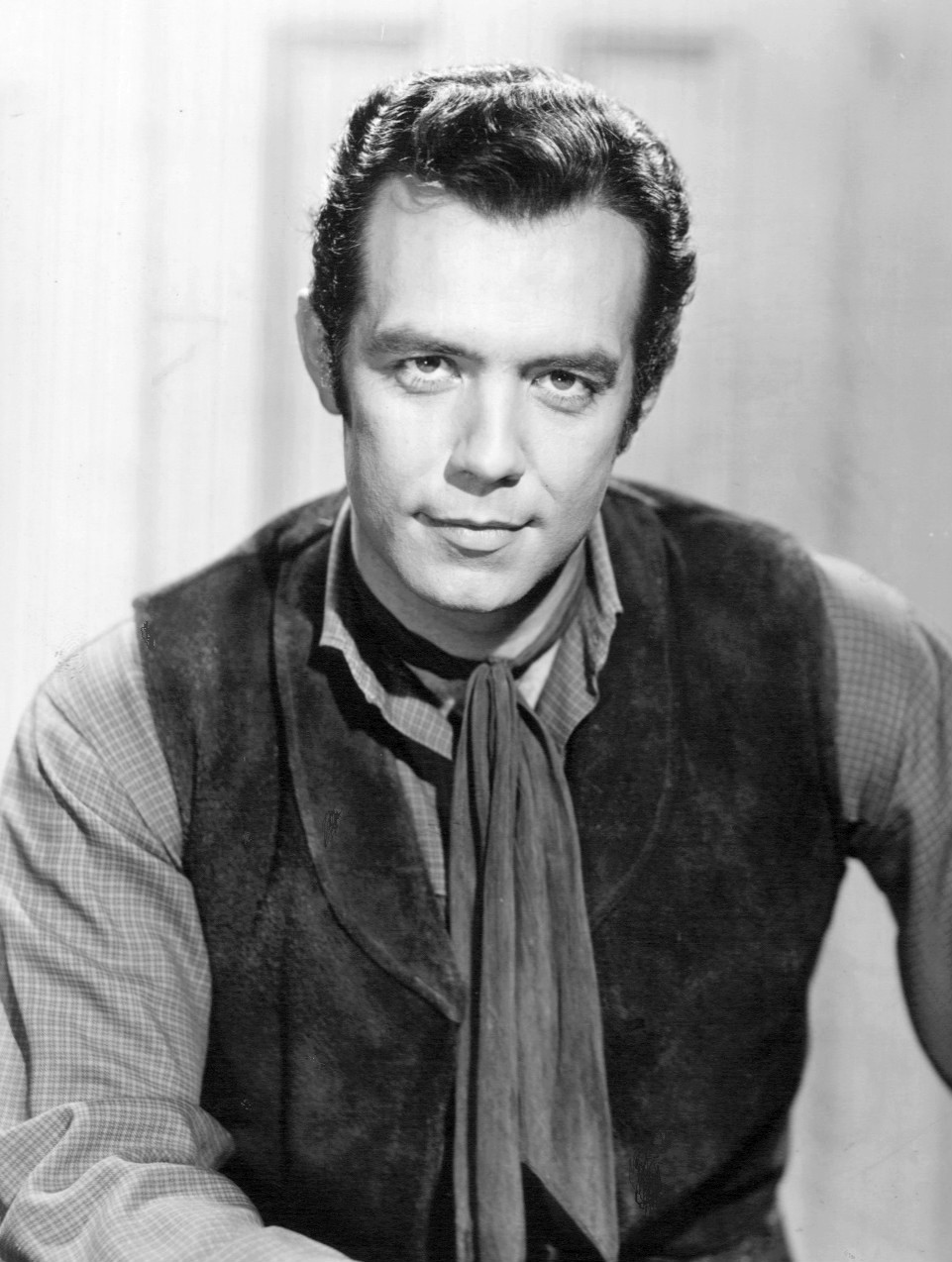
Pernell Roberts as Adam Cartwright in a publicity still for Bonanza, 1959

In much later interviews, Roberts denied statements about Bonanza attributed to him. "I did not enjoy Bonanza anymore ... but I never said those things people said I said." He was, however, "too wise not to recognize its weaknesses." In a 1963 interview, he asked a reporter, "Isn't it a bit silly for three adult males to have to ask father's permission for everything they do?" "They told me the four characters (Lorne Greene, patriarch Ben, Dan Blocker and Michael Landon as his brothers) would be carefully defined and the scripts carefully prepared; none of it ever happened," he complained to the Associated Press in 1964. He objected to how Bonanza portrayed the relationship between the "father" and adult "sons", describing it as "adolescent".

Roberts acknowledged reasons for Bonanza's appeal, but pointed to his personal need for story lines with greater social relevance, adult themes, and dialogue. He wanted Bonanza to be "a little more grown up" (Mike Douglas Show, 1966). He also noted that he was not suited to the "procedural" and "confining aspect" of series television, another reason for his dissatisfaction, while on the show.(Mike Douglas Show, 1966)

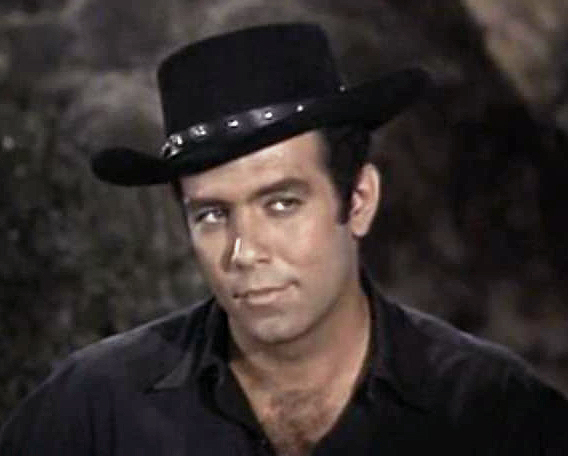
As Adam in "The Hopefuls" (1960)

Roberts had high hopes for what he could contribute to Bonanza and was disappointed with the direction of the show, and the limitations imposed on his Bonanza character and on his acting range. In a newspaper interview, he said, "I haven't grown at all since the series began...I have an impotent role. Wherever I turn there's the father image."

Finally, after disagreements with writers and producers over the quality of the scripts, characterization, and Bonanza's refusal to allow him to perform elsewhere while on contract, Roberts "turned his back on Hollywood wisdom and well-meant advice," and left, largely to return to legitimate theater.

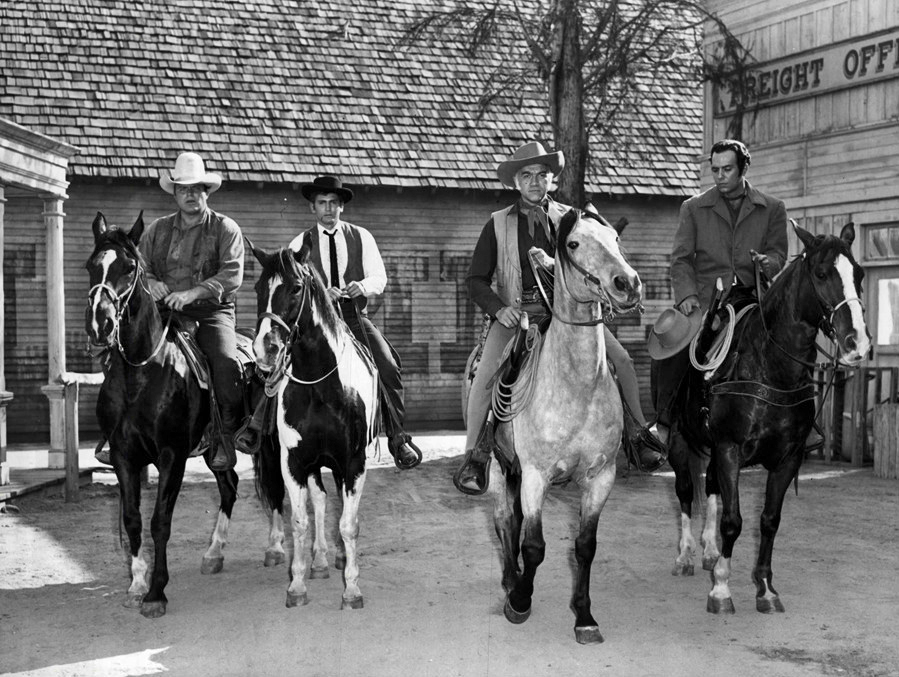
Dan Blocker, Michael Landon, Lorne Greene, and Roberts in Bonanza, 1959

Roberts fulfilled, but did not extend his six-year contract for Bonanza, and when he left the series, his character was eliminated with the explanation that Adam had "moved away." Later episodes suggested variously that Adam was "at sea", had moved to Europe, or was on the East Coast, running that end of the family business. The last episode Pernell Roberts worked on was "Dead and Gone", air date April 4, 1965. He appeared in the next two that aired, which were filmed prior to "Dead and Gone": "A Good Night's Rest", air date April 11, 1965, and "To Own The World", air date April 18, 1965. Adam Cartwright was mentioned on occasion in the series (including a 1967 episode that did not air until April 4, 1971 ("Kingdom of Fear").

Bonanza producer David Dortort described Roberts as "rebellious, outspoken ... and aloof," but as one who "could make any scene he was in better ...". In a later archive interview, he regretted not having insisted on a "marriage for Adam" and having Roberts continue on the show as a semiregular. He added, "I must confess ... I was too hard on him. I did not appreciate him. I knew he was good, but I didn't realize he was that good [...] none better." In the last two Bonanza movies that aired on NBC in the early 1990s, the story line stated that Adam, now in Australia, had equaled his father's success, dominating the engineering/construction business.

==== Singing ====
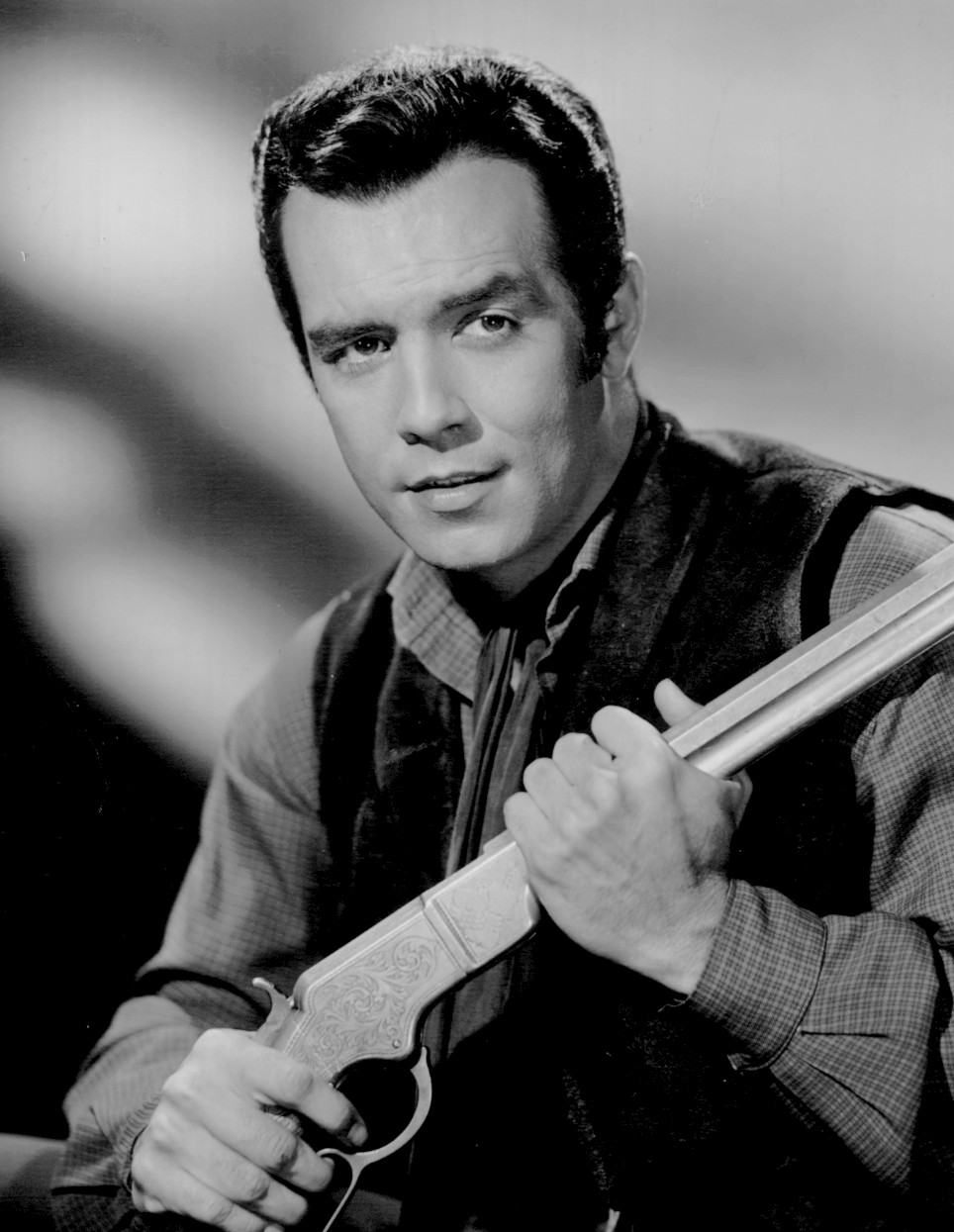
Roberts in Bonanza, 1961

Roberts was the only accomplished singer of the original cast, though David Canary, who joined Bonanza in 1967, had a background in voice and performed on Broadway. During Roberts's Bonanza years, he recorded Come All Ye Fair and Tender Ladies, a folk music album, which AllMusic calls "... the softer, lyrical side of folk music—pleasant and not challenging, but quite rewarding in its unassuming way." The album, released by RCA Victor and arranged by Dick Rosmini, is available on compact disc only as part of the fourth disc of the Bonanza 4-CD boxed set on Bear Family Records.

On the Bonanza box-set albums, Roberts also sings "Early One Morning", "In the Pines", "The New Born King", "The Bold Soldier", "Mary Ann", "They Call the Wind Maria", "Sylvie", "Lily of the West", "The Water is Wide", "Rake and a Ramblin' Boy", "A Quiet Girl", "Shady Grove", "Alberta", and "Empty Pocket Blues".

== Mixed theatre, film and television ==
After Bonanza, Roberts played summer stock theatre, regional theaters, and episodic TV, which gave him the opportunity to play a wide variety of roles. He toured with musicals such as The King and I, Kiss Me Kate, Camelot, and The Music Man, and dramas such as Tiny Alice. He played Jigger in an ABC television presentation of Carousel and was featured in a CBS Playhouse production, Dear Friends.

In 1967, Roberts starred in the lavish, but short-lived David Merrick production of Mata Hari, directed by Vincente Minnelli. The show had a much-publicized "chaotic" preview performance due to technical problems stemming from lack of rehearsal time at the National Theatre in Washington, DC, where the preview performance took place. "What was offered the people of Washington was a dress rehearsal. David Merrick spoke to the audience beforehand warning them of this." Problems were corrected by the official opening night, when the show received good reviews for Roberts, musical score and lyrics, stage design, and costumes, but poor reviews for its co-star and other aspects of the production. The show, nevertheless, was thought to have the potential to continue to Broadway. "Mata Hari was a show with a great story, two fascinating characters, and some accessory mess that could have easily been tidied up by anyone but Vincente Minnelli." But Merrick, "instead of bringing someone to clean house closed the production down".

In 1972, Roberts returned to Broadway and toured with Ingrid Bergman in Captain Brassbound's Conversion, in which he played the title role. "Particularly helpful is Pernell Roberts in the acted-upon title role ... This actor is a sturdy, not unamusing leading-man type and may his appearance as a Bergman costar be rewarded beyond Bonanza."

In 1973, Roberts was nominated for a Joseph Jefferson Award for his performance in Welcome Home at the Ivanhoe Theatre in Chicago. The same year, Roberts starred as Rhett Butler opposite Lesley Ann Warren, in another major production, Gone with the Wind, at the Chandler Pavilion in Los Angeles, again receiving good personal reviews, amidst weak reviews for the rest of the show.

His additional stage credits after Bonanza include Two for the Seesaw, A Thousand Clowns, One Flew Over the Cuckoo's Nest, Any Wednesday, and The Sound of Music (as Captain von Trapp). He did The Night of the Iguana while still playing in Bonanza in 1963.

In television interviews, Roberts said that he would have stayed with Bonanza, had he been allowed to do so on a part-time basis to enable him to return to theater.

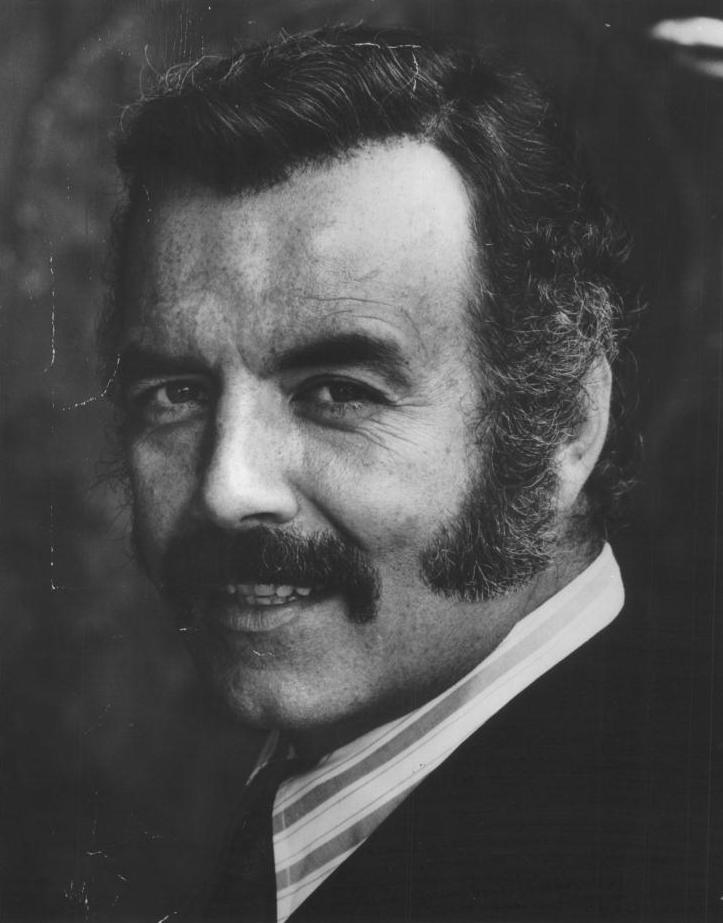
Publicity photo of Pernell Roberts, 1972

Roberts played Jim Conrad, the lead role, in the 1971 TV movie that served as a pilot for the series San Francisco International Airport, though the role was played by Lloyd Bridges in the actual episodes of the series. Roberts guest-starred in TV shows such as The Girl from U.N.C.L.E., The Virginian, The Big Valley, Lancer, Mission: Impossible (four episodes), Have Gun – Will Travel, Marcus Welby, M.D., The Wild Wild West, Ironside (two episodes), The Rockford Files, Gunsmoke, Mannix, Vega$, The Odd Couple, Hawaii Five-O, The Love Boat, Hotel, The Hardy Boys/Nancy Drew Mysteries, Nakia, Night Gallery, The Bold Ones, The Quest, Police Story, Most Wanted, Westside Medical, Man from Atlantis, Jigsaw John, The Sixth Sense, Quincy, M.E. The Feather and Father Gang, Hawkins, The Men from Shiloh, Perry Mason, The Wide World of Mystery, and The Six Million Dollar Man, and appeared in miniseries, including Captains and the Kings, Centennial, The Immigrants, and Around the World in 80 Days. He starred in two cult films, Four Rode Out (1971) and Kashmiri Run (1970), directed by veteran TV director John Peyser, and other feature films, including The Magic of Lassie (1978). He co-starred or was featured in several TV movies, including, The Adventures of Nick Carter, Dead Man on the Run, Assignment Vienna's pilot Assignment: Munich, The Night Rider, The Silent Gun, The Lives of Jenny Dolan, The Deadly Tower, Hot Rod, Desperado, The Bravos, and High Noon, Part II: The Return of Will Kane.

=== Trapper John, M.D. ===
In 1979, Roberts again achieved star status as the lead in Trapper John, M.D. (1979–1986), receiving an Emmy nomination in 1981, and playing the character twice as long as Wayne Rogers had (1972–1975) on CBS's M*A*S*H series. Roberts told TV Guide in 1979 that he chose to return to weekly television after watching his father age and realizing that it was a vulnerable time to be without financial security. "The show allowed Roberts both to use his dramatic range and to address issues," wrote The Independent.

In the 1980s and 1990s, playing off his Trapper John M.D. persona, Roberts acted as TV spokesman for Ecotrin, a brand of ASA-based analgesic tablets. His roles since included Donor (1990) with Melissa Gilbert and Checkered Flag (1990). He appeared as captain of the CBS teams for Battle of the Network Stars 11 and 12.

Of the period between series, Roberts said he enjoyed moving around and playing different characters. During that time, he also toured university campuses conducting seminars on play production, acting, and poetry.

=== Final roles ===
In 1980, Roberts reunited with his former Bonanza co-star Lorne Greene, for two episodes of Vega$.

In 1988, Roberts co-starred with Milla Jovovich in the TV movie The Night Train to Kathmandu.

He guest-starred as Hezekiah Horn in the powerful Young Riders episode, "Requiem for a Hero", for which he won a Western Heritage Award in 1991.

In interviews, Roberts had described television as a "director's and film cutter's medium," but he himself was described as a "born television actor ... low key."

He narrated documentaries, including the National Geographic episode, "Alaska, The Great Land" in 1965, "In the Realm of the Alligator" in 1986, the TV special Code One about the work of paramedics in 1989, and "The Mountain Men" episode of the History Channel, 1999.

From 1991 to 1993, in his last venture into series television, Roberts lent his distinctive voice to host and narrate the TV anthology series, FBI: The Untold Stories. He made his last TV appearance in 1997 on an episode of Diagnosis: Murder, updating a Mannix character he had portrayed decades before.

In his later life, and after the death of all of his former Bonanza co-stars, Roberts "jokingly referred to himself as, 'Pernell, the last one, Roberts.'" He read Bonanza Gold Magazine, which was like looking at an old family album, he said, and watched reruns of Bonanza when he wanted to see old friends.

== Activism ==
Roberts was publicly involved in the civil rights movement while starring in Bonanza. In 1963 he joined Congress of Racial Equality pickets against an all-white housing development in Torrance, California, carrying a placard calling for fair housing. In March 1965 he and his wife Judith took part in the third of the Selma to Montgomery marches in Alabama, walking alongside Martin Luther King Jr.

On the set of Bonanza, Roberts objected to the series' all-white crews and guest casts, and he pressed NBC not to hire white actors to portray non-white characters. According to a statement released by his family after his death, his protests on the set found some support, though never enough to satisfy him. His criticism of the show's lack of minority actors was among the reasons cited for his departure after the 1964–65 season. The family statement described him as having spent much of his adult life pursuing equality for all.

== Personal life and death ==
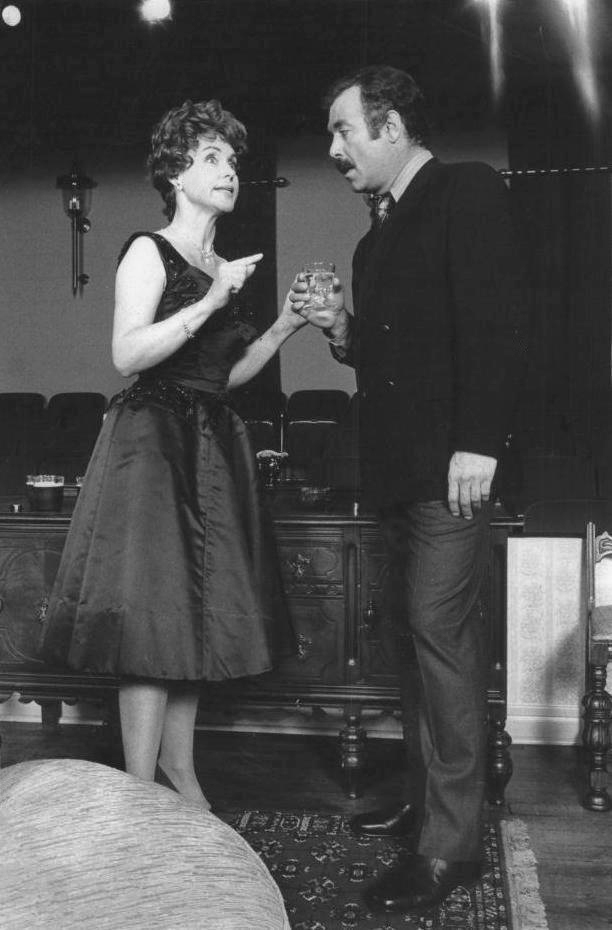
Onstage, 1972

Roberts married four times, first in 1951 to Vera Mowry — a professor of theatre history at Washington State University and subsequently Hunter College, as well as professor emerita of the PhD program in theatre at City University of New York, with whom he had his only child. Roberts and his first wife later divorced. His son died in a motorcycle accident in 1989.

Roberts married Judith Anna LeBrecque on October 15, 1962; they divorced in 1971. He subsequently married Kara Knack in 1972. They divorced in 1996. Roberts married Eleanor Criswell in 1996.

Roberts died on January 24, 2010, from pancreatic cancer, at age 81.

== Selected filmography ==
=== Film ===
- Desire Under the Elms (1958) – Peter Cabot
- The Sheepman (1958) – Chocktaw Neal
- Ride Lonesome (1959) – Sam Boone
- The Errand Boy (1961) – Adam Cartwright – Cameo (uncredited)
- The Silent Gun (1969, TV Movie) – Sam Benner
- Four Rode Out (1970) – U.S. Marshal Ross
- The Kashmiri Run (1970) – Gregory Nelson
- The Bravos (1972, TV Movie) – Jackson Buckley
- The Adventures of Nick Carter (1972, TV Movie) – Neal Duncan
- Assignment: Munich (1972, TV Movie) – C. C. Bryan
- Dead Man on the Run (1975, TV Movie) – Brock Dillon
- The Deadly Tower (1975, TV Movie) – Lieutenant Lee
- The Lives of Jenny Dolan (1975, TV Movie) – Camera Shop Proprietor
- Paco (1976) – Pompiho
- Charlie Cobb: Nice Night for a Hanging (1977 TV Movie) – Sheriff Yates
- The Magic of Lassie (1978) – Jamison
- The Immigrants (1978, TV Movie) – Anthony Cassala
- The Night Rider (1979, TV Movie) – Alex Sheridan
- Hot Rod (1979, TV Movie) – Sheriff Marsden
- High Noon, Part II: The Return of Will Kane (1980, TV Movie) – Marshal J. D. Ward
- Incident at Crestridge (1981, TV Movie) – Mayor Hill
- Desperado (1987, TV Movie) – Marshal Dancey
- The Night Train to Kathmandu (1988, TV Movie) – Prof. Harry Hadley-Smithe
- Perry Mason: The Case of the All-Star Assassin (1989, TV Movie) – Thatcher Horton
- Donor (1990, TV Movie) – Dr. Martingale
- Checkered Flag (1990) – Andrew Valiant

=== Partial television credits ===
- Bonanza (1959–1965) – Adam Cartwright (167 episodes)
- One Step Beyond (1959) – Sgt. Vaill
- The Virginian (1966) – The Long Way Home (as Jim Boyer)
- The Girl from U.N.C.L.E. (1966) – The Little John Doe Affair (as Joey Celeste)
- Gunsmoke (1967) – Stranger in Town (as hired killer, Dave Reeves)
- The Big Valley - 2 episodes, "Cage of Eagles" as Madigan and "Run of the Cat" as Ed Tanner
- Mission: Impossible (1967) – President Beyron Rurich
- Mission: Impossible (1968) – Colonel Hans Krim
- Mission: Impossible (1970) – Chief Manuel Corba
- Hawaii Five-O (1971) – The Grandstand Play – as Lon Phillips (pro baseball player)
- Mission: Impossible (1973) – Boomer
- Cannon (1976) 5x18 The House Of Cards as Sid Cleary / Phil Denton
- Captains and the Kings (1976) - episode "Chapter II" as Colonel Elbert Braithwaite
- Barnaby Jones (1977) – Testament of Power – as Daniel Matthews
- Man from Atlantis (1977) – S1/E10 "Shoot-Out At Land's End" – as Clint Hollister
- Vega$ (1978–1980) – 3 episodes
- Mannix (TV series) (1973) – "Little Lost Girl" as George Fallon
- Hawkins (TV series) (1974) – "Candidate for Murder"
- Centennial (1978) – episodes 4 and 5, as Gen. Asher
- Rockford Files The House on Willis Avenue (1978)
- Trapper John, M.D. (1979–1986) – Trapper John McIntyre
- The Love Boat (1980) – The Mallory Quest
- Diagnosis: Murder (1994–1997) – George Fallon / Dr. Elliott Valin (final appearance)
