= Karl Lukas =

American film and television actor (1919–95)

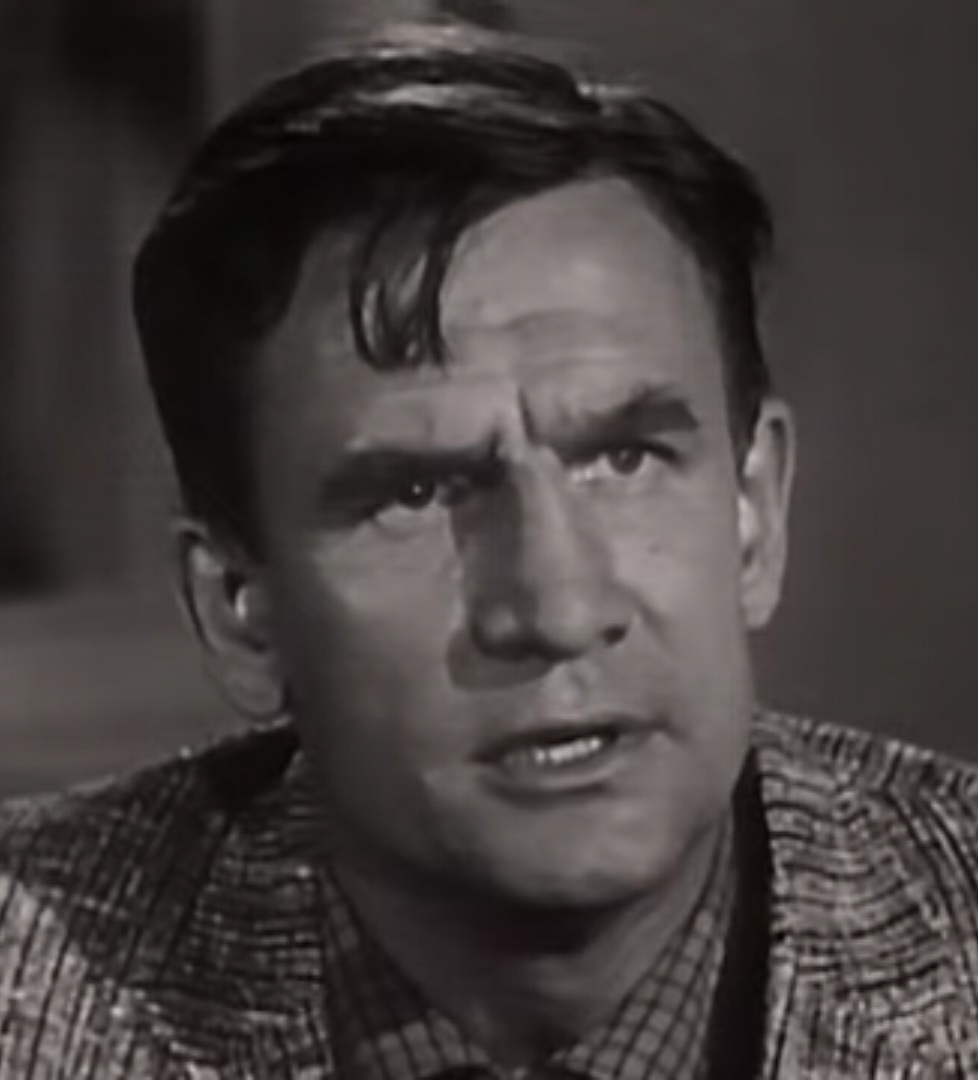
- Karl Lukas in Man with a Camera (1958)
- Born: Karol Louis Lukasiak; August 21, 1919; Lowell, Massachusetts, U.S.
- Died: January 16, 1995 (aged 75); Westlake Village, California, U.S.
- Resting place: San Fernando Mission Cemetery
- Occupations: Film and television actor
- Spouse: Stephanie Lukas
- Children: 2

Karl Lukas (born Karol Louis Lukasiak; August 21, 1919 – January 16, 1995) was an American film and television actor. He was best known for playing Private Stash Kadowski in The Phil Silvers Show.

Lukas guest-starred in numerous television programs including The Andy Griffith Show, Gunsmoke, Bonanza, The Rockford Files, The Dick Van Dyke Show, Rawhide, Wagon Train, The Beverly Hillbillies, Alfred Hitchcock Presents, The F.B.I., Petticoat Junction, and The Monkees. He also appeared in a few episodes of Family Affair, Bewitched, and Mister Ed.

Lukas died on January 16, 1995 of heart failure in Westlake Village, California, at the age of 75. He was buried at San Fernando Mission Cemetery.

== Filmography ==
=== Film ===
Year	Title	Role	Notes
1954	The Long, Long Trailer	Inspector	Uncredited
1957	Under Fire	Sergeant Hutchins	
1958	The True Story of Lynn Stuart	Hal Bruck	Uncredited
1958	Onionhead	Agnelli	
1958	Torpedo Run	Hallert	Uncredited
1959	The Trap	'Greenie'	Uncredited
1959	Don't Give Up the Ship	Dugan	Uncredited
1960	Visit to a Small Planet	Policeman	Uncredited
1960	Tall Story	1st Detective	
1960	The Facts of Life	Parent At Meeting	Uncredited
1960	The Great Impostor	Prisoner	Uncredited
1961	Creature from the Haunted Sea	Bartender	Uncredited
1963	The Thrill of It All	Worker	Uncredited
1967	Warning Shot	Custodian	Uncredited
1967	Thoroughly Modern Millie	Bouncer	Uncredited
1970	Watermelon Man	Policeman #2	
1970	Which Way to the Front?	SS Guard	Uncredited
1970	There Was a Crooked Man...	Otis	
1970	Tora! Tora! Tora!	Captain Harold C. Train, USS California	
1971	Josie's Castle	1st Narc	
1972	Black Jack		
1973	Blume in Love	Karl, Cleaning Man	
1973	Emperor of the North Pole	'Pokey' Stiff	
1973	Oklahoma Crude	Hobo #1	
1974	Blazing Saddles	Cutthroat #1	Uncredited
1974	Herbie Rides Again	Angry Construction Worker	
1974	99 and 44/100% Dead	Guard	
1974	Earthquake	Man #3	Uncredited
1975	Las Vegas Lady	Connors	
1975	Whiffs	Wally, The Bartender	
1975	Hustle	Charley	
1976	Two-Minute Warning	Couple At S.W.A.T. Call	
1976	The Shaggy D.A.	Painter	
1979	The Frisco Kid	Bartender	
1986	Big Trouble	Police Captain	
1988	Memories of Me	Bartender	

=== Television ===
Year	Title	Role	Notes
1951	Lux Video Theatre	Bob	Season 1 Episode 18: "The Shiny People"
1951	Pulitzer Prize Playhouse		Season 1 Episode 32: "The Thousand Yard Look"
1953	Dark of Night		Season 1 Episode 13
1953	Four Star Playhouse	Ernie	Season 2 Episode 2: "The Squeeze"
1953	Armstrong Circle Theatre	Kreuger	Season 4 Episode 12: "The Bells of Cockaigne"
1954	Inner Sanctum	Tommy	Season 1 Episode 30: "Reward for Janie"
1954	Studio One in Hollywood	Hank, Man Who Struck Carter	Season 7 Episode 8: "An Almanac of Liberty"
1955	The United States Steel Hour	Stoker	Season 2 Episode 12: "Freighter"
1955	The Ed Sullivan Show	Himself / Private 'Stash' Kadowski	2 episodes
1955	Crossroads		Season 1 Episode 6: "Broadway Trust"
1955-1958	The Phil Silvers Show	Private 'Stash' Kadowski	96 episodes
1957	Climax!		Season 3 Episode 45: "Necessary Evil"
1957	The Court of Last Resort	Karl Hooft	Season 1 Episode 6: "The Karl Hooft Case"
1958	Tombstone Territory	'Red' Slade	Season 1 Episode 25: "Skeleton Canyon Massacre"
1958	Suspicion	Max Proudfoot	Season 1 Episode 34: "Death Watch"
1958	The Rifleman	Oliver	Season 1 Episode 5: "The Brother-in-Law"
1958	Steve Canyon	Dave Newman	Season 1 Episode 8: "Operation Moby Dick"
1958	Man with a Camera	Pete Montee	Season 1 Episode 6: "Double Negative"
1958	Playhouse 90	Willie Marks	Season 3 Episode 11: "Seven Against the Wall"
1959	Lawman	Sergeant Blaney	Season 1 Episode 18: "The Runaway"
1959	State Trooper	Harry 'Duke' Jackson	Season 3 Episode 15: "The Choker"
1959	Yancy Derringer	The Warrior	Season 1 Episode 28: "The Wayward Warrior"
1959	Johnny Ringo	Cather	Season 1 Episode 5: "The Hunters"
1959	Hawaiian Eye	Arthur	Season 1 Episode 10: "Secret of the Second Door"
1959	The Deputy	Luke Dillon	Season 1 Episode 15: "The Orphans"
1959	The Untouchables	Agent at Raid	Pilot Episode
1960	Not for Hire	Jack Stefano	Season 1 Episode 18: "The Set Up"
1960	The Man from Blackhawk	Boyd	Season 1 Episode 21: "Execution Day"
1960	Bourbon Street Beat	Augie Liuzza	Season 1 Episode 19: "The 10% Blues"
1960	Bourbon Street Beat	Davis	Season 1 Episode 29: "Six Hours to Midnight" (uncredited)
1960	The Slowest Gun in the West	Jake Dalton	TV movie
1960	This Man Dawson	Unknown	Season 1 Episode 20: "Get Dawson"
1960	Pete and Gladys	'Rocky'	Season 1 Episode 6: "Oo-La-La"
1960	Surfside 6	Hood	Season 1 Episode 6: "Par-a-kee" (uncredited)
1960	The DuPont Show with June Allyson	1st Officer	Season 2 Episode 13: "A Silent Panic"
1961	Dante	Roscoe	Season 1 Episode 13: "Wine, Women and Willie"
1961	Klondike	Gang Member	Season 1 Episode 13: "The Golden Burro"
1961	Miami Undercover	Toledo	Season 1 Episode 17: "The Rocky Caper"
1961	Guestward, Ho!	Policeman	Season 1 Episode 38: "No Place Like Home"
1961	Hennesey	Chief Kowalski	Season 2 Episode 28: "The Patient Vanishes"
1961	Hennesey	Herman	Season 2 Episode 29: "Shore Patrol Revisited"
1961	Hennesey	Franks	Season 3 Episode 1: "The Gossip Go-Round"
1961	Alfred Hitchcock Presents	Otto	Season 6 Episode 28: "Gratitude"
1961	Alfred Hitchcock Presents	Mailman	Season 7 Episode 2: "Bang! You're Dead"
1961	Alfred Hitchcock Presents	Uncle Ben, the Bar Owner	Season 7 Episode 10: "Services Rendered"
1961	77 Sunset Strip	Hood #1	Season 3 Episode 19: "The College Caper"
1962	Alfred Hitchcock Presents	Soldier Fresno	Season 7 Episode 26: "Ten O'Clock Tiger"
1962	Outlaws	York	Season 2 Episode 20: "No More Horses"
1962	Wagon Train	Dr. Parnell	Season 6 Episode 11: "The Kurt Davos Story"
1962	Don't Call Me Charlie!	Sergeant Childress	Season 1 Episode 4: "A Friend in Need"
1962	Don't Call Me Charlie!	MP	Season 1 Episode 13: "Build a Better Mousetrap"
1962	Mister Ed	Harry	Season 2 Episode 16: "Horse Wash"
1962	Mister Ed	George	Season 3 Episode 2: "Wilbur the Good Samaritan"
1962	Mister Ed	Charlie	Season 3 Episode 10: "Disappearing Horse"
1963	77 Sunset Strip	Monk	Season 5 Episode 32: "Lady in the Sun" (uncredited)
1963	The Untouchables	Yanos Dalker	Season 4 Episode 25: "The Giant Killer"
1963	GE True	Stoker	Season 1 Episode 14: "Open Season"
1963	The Beverly Hillbillies	Frank	Season 1 Episode 19: "Elly's Animals"
1963	Ben Casey	Mike Vetley	Season 2 Episode 19: "A Short Biographical Sketch of James Tuttle Peabody, M.D."
1963	Wide Country	Turk Samuels	Season 1 Episode 27: "The Lucky Punch"
1963	The Alfred Hitchcock Hour	Mel Tanner	Season 1 Episode 28: "Last Seen Wearing Blue Jeans"
1963	My Favorite Martian	Bruno	Season 1 Episode 9: "Rocket to Mars"
1964	77 Sunset Strip	Thug	Season 6 Episode 17: "Not Such a Simple Knot" (uncredited)
1964	The Travels of Jaimie McPheeters	Rowdy #2	Season 1 Episode 20: "The Day of the Tin Trumpet"
1964	The Great Adventure	Milk Truck Driver	Season 1 Episode 22: "The Henry Bergh Story"
1964	The Andy Griffith Show	Sergeant	Season 4 Episode 32: "Gomer Pyle, U.S.M.C."
1964	Many Happy Returns	Cop	Season 1 Episode 6: "Joe's Place"
1964	The Cara Williams Show	Police Officer	Season 1 Episode 10: "Help, I'm Being Held Prisoner by a Teenager"
1964	Mickey	Policeman	Season 1 Episode 12: "For the Love of Grandpa Toddie"
1964	The Lucy Show	Mail Sorter	Season 3 Episode 14: "Lucy and the Missing Stamp"
1964	Gunsmoke	Hardy	Season 10 Episode 8: "Hung High" (uncredited)
1964	Bewitched	1st Policeman	Season 1 Episode 3: "It Shouldn't Happen to a Dog"
1965	Mister Ed	Policeman	Season 5 Episode 23: "Robin Hood Ed"
1965	Slattery's People	Hensen	Season 1 Episode 16: "Question: How Do You Fall in Love with a Town?"
1965	My Living Doll	Harry	Season 1 Episode 24: "A Paris Original"
1965	The Legend of Jesse James	Luke Hamlin	Season 1 Episode 1: "Three Men from Now"
1965	Rawhide	Cole Wallace	Season 7 Episode 27: "The Calf Women"
1965	Rawhide	Posse Member	Season 8 Episode 1: "Encounter at Boot Hill" (uncredited)
1965	The Dick Van Dyke Show	Hugo	Season 5 Episode 3: "Uhny Uftz"
1965	The Donna Reed Show	Police Officer	Season 8 Episode 1: "Pop Goes Theresa"
1965	The Donna Reed Show	Mr. Swanson	Season 8 Episode 9: "Trees"
1965	Bonanza	Brother	Season 7 Episode 6: "Devil on Her Shoulder"
1966	Gunsmoke	Williams	Season 11 Episode 16: "Death Watch"
1966	Gunsmoke	Lake	Season 12 Episode 9: "The Well"
1966	I Spy	Agent #2	Episode: "The Barter"
1966	The Monkees	Rocco	S1:E11, "Monkees à la Carte"
1966	Shane	Ed Howell	2 episodes
1966	Occasional Wife	Workman	Episode: "Peter by Moonlight"
1966-1970	Family Affair	Mr. Parker / Scotty	10 episodes
1967	The Phyllis Diller Show	Wally	1 episode
1967	Lassie	Workman	Episode: "A Matter of Seconds"
1967	Batman	Acacia	Episode: "Louie, the Lilac"
1967	Iron Horse	Bartender	Episode: "Death Has Two Faces"
1968	Bewitched	Benny	Season 5 Episode 11: "I Don't Want to Be a Toad, I Want to Be a Butterfly"
1968	Bewitched	Keeper #1	Season 5 Episode 27: "Daddy Does His Thing"
1968	Here Come the Brides	1st Mate	Season 1 Episode 4: "The Man of the Family"
1968	Mannix	Starkey	Season 1 Episode 23: "To Kill a Writer"
1969	Room 222	Policeman	Season 1 Episode 10: "Fathers and Sons"
1969	Petticoat Junction	Charlie Hanks	Season 7 Episode 11: "Kathy Jo's First Birthday"
1970	Bracken's World	Detective	Season 1 Episode 18: "A Perfect Piece of Casting"
1970	Then Came Bronson	Billy	Season 1 Episode 22: "Still Waters"
1970	The Immortal	Supernintendent	Season 1 Episode 2: "White Elephants Don't Grow on Trees"
1970	The Bold Ones: The Lawyers	Sam Jessop	Season 2 Episode 4: "The People Against Doctor Chapman"
1971	Bewitched	Braun	Season 7 Episode 23: "Money Happy Returns"
1971	Mannix	Bartender	Season 5 Episode 6: "Days Beyond Recall"
1971	The Young Lawyers	Mechanic	Season 1 Episode 23: "Conrad and the Taxi Squad"
1971	The Smith Family	Mr. Hill	Season 2 Episode 11: "Man in the Middle"
1971	Night Gallery	Iceman	Season 2 Episode 12: "Cool Air/Camera Obscura/Quoth the Raven"
1971	Cannon	Rettig	Season 1 Episode 3: "Call Unicorn"
1972	Bonanza	Irons	Season 13 Episode 20: "Shanklin"
1972	Nichols	Harry Carmichael	Season 1 Episode 24: "Bertha"
1972	The Mod Squad	Bus Driver	Season 5 Episode 5: "Taps, Play It Louder" (uncredited)
1972	The New Temperatures Rising Show	Piano Mover	Season 1 Episode 8: "Tenor Loving Care"
1974	Cannon	Truck Driver	Season 4 Episode 7: "Call Unicorn"
1974	The Odd Couple	Olaf	Season 4 Episode 14: "The Moonlighter"
1975	Little House on the Prairie	Jebediah Mumfort	Season 2 Episode 4: "In the Big Inning"
1975	Barbary Coast	'Hobie'	Season 1 Episode 10: "Sharks Eat Sharks"
1975	The Invisible Man	1st Truck Driver	Season 1 Episode 8: "Pin Money"
1976	Ellery Queen	Sergeant Harris	Season 1 Episode 17: "The Adventure of the Sinister Scenario"
1976	The Rockford Files	Officer	Season 2 Episode 19: "The Italian Bird Fiasco"
1976	Ark II	Cyrus	Season 1 Episode 2: "The Slaves"
1977	Switch	Mario	Season 2 Episode 23: "Whatever Happened to Carol Harmony?"
1981	Quincy, M.E.	2nd Man	Season 6 Episode 12: "Jury Duty"
1985	Murder: By Reason of Insanity	Speaker at Polish Hall	TV movie
1985-1987	St. Elsewhere	Carl, Maintenance Man	Season 4 Episode 4: "The Naked and the Dead" (1985); Season 4 Episode 7: "Close Encounters (1985); Season 4 Episode 10: "Loss of Power" (1985); Season 4 Episode 21: "Cheek to Cheek" (1986); Season 6 Episode 1: "Resurrection" (1987); Season 6 Episode 10: "No Chemo, Sabe?" (1987)
1991	Don't Touch My Daughter	Casey	TV movie, (final film role)
