= Jan Shepard filmography =

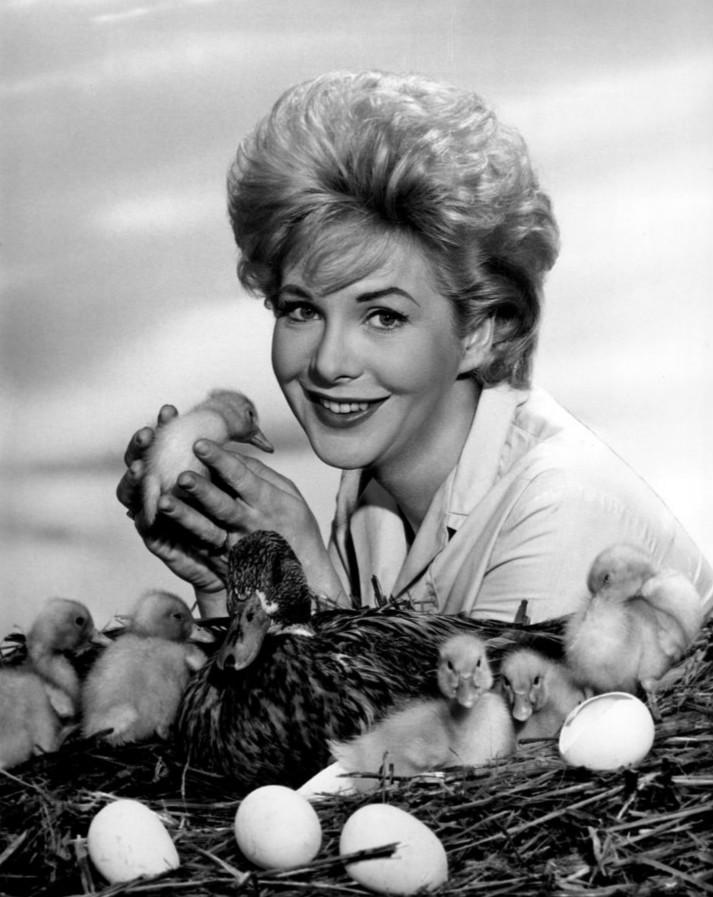
Shepard in 1963

This is the complete filmography of actress Jan Shepard.

== Film and television credits ==
- 2017 Western Trails - Margery - The Cisco Kid in Memphis
- 1973 The Rookies - Claire Amazeen - Code 261
- 1972 That Certain Summer - Jody Bonner
- 1972 Longstreet - Alice Paige - Survival Times Two
- 1970 Marcus Welby, M.D. - Anita Rivera - Labyrinth
- 1970 Then Came Bronson - Helen Casper - The Gleam of the Eagle Mind
- 1965-1969 The Virginian - Various Roles - The Runaway (1969) - Stopover (1969) - The Long Way Home (1966) - Harvest of Strangers (1966) - The Brothers (1965)
- 1969 Land of the Giants - Osla Ekorb - Shell Game
- 1967-1968 The High Chaparral - Various Roles - Our Lady of Guadalupe (1968) - Sudden Country (1967)
- 1967-1968 The F.B.I. - Various Roles - The Runaways (1968) - Line of Fire
- 1968 Mannix - Rose - Another Final Exit
- 1967 Ironside - Adrienne May - The Taker
- 1967 Walt Disney's Wonderful World of Color - Ruth Richards - Atta Girl, Kelly!: K for Kelly
- 1961-1967 Gunsmoke - Various Roles - Noose of Gold (1967) - Friend (1964) - Old Faces (1961) - Tall Trapper (1961)
- 1967 The Road West - Ellen Brewster - No Sanctuary
- 1966 The Doomsday Flight - Mrs. Thompson
- 1966 Paradise, Hawaiian Style - Betty Kohana
- 1966 A Man Called Shenandoah - Ann Winters - Plunder
- 1966 Bonanza - Sally - The Code
- 1965 The Long, Hot Summer - Bess Quick - The Return of the Quicks
- 1965 Convoy - Gillian Haney - No More Souvenirs
- 1962-1965 Perry Mason - Various Roles - The Case of the Runaway Racer (1965) - The Case of the Paper Bullets (1964) - The Case of the Deadly Verdict (1963) - The Case of the Capricious Corpse (1962)
- 1964 Della - Secretary
- 1964 Kraft Suspense Theatre - Policewoman - Who Is Jennifer?
- 1963 G.E. True - Eve Temple (Recurring role, 2 episodes) - Black Market - Gertie the Great
- 1963 The Lloyd Bridges Show - Edna - The Skippy Mannox Story
- 1961-1962 Laramie - Various Roles - Bad Blood (1962) - The Jailbreakers (1961) - Badge of the Outsider (1961)
- 1962 King of Diamonds - Katerin - The Diamond Makers
- 1962 Third of a Man - Helen
- 1962 Lawman - Madelyn Chase - Change of Venue
- 1961 Cain's Hundred - Karen - King of the Mountain
- 1961 Everglades - Millie Johnson - Greed of the Glades
- 1961 The Brothers Brannagan - Annabelle - The Annabelle Case
- 1960-1961 Lock Up - Various Roles - The Intruder (1961) - Last Chance (1960)
- 1961 Stagecoach West - Emily Prince - The Raider
- 1961 Assignment: Underwater - Carol Maze - Witness from the Dead
- 1961 Gunslinger - Constance Cameron Jenks - Rampage
- 1961 Bat Masterson - Jody Reese - Bullwhacker's Bounty
- 1959-1961 Rawhide - Various Roles - Incident at the Top of the World (1961) - Incident at Sulphur Creek (1960) - Incident with an Executioner (1959)
- 1961 Dante - Wife - Dial D for Dante
- 1960 The Clear Horizon - Betty Howard
- 1960 Philip Marlowe - Faye Loomis - Last Call for Murder
- 1960 Tombstone Territory - Cheri Deger - State's Witness
- 1960 Wanted: Dead or Alive - Lilith Preston - Mental Lapse
- 1960 U.S. Marshal - Betty Morgan - Murder, My Darling
- 1959 The Man and the Challenge - Dr. Anna West - White Out
- 1959 Wichita Town - Clara Bennett - Man on the Hill
- 1959 Attack of the Giant Leeches - Nan Greyson
- 1959 Richard Diamond, Private Detective - Betty Wilson - Rough Cut
- 1959 The Adventures of Rin Tin Tin - Ella Clarkson - Apache Stampede
- 1958-1959 Highway Patrol - Various Roles- Framed Cop (1959) - Explosives (1958)
- 1959 Trackdown - Emily Monroe - Terror
- 1958 The Californians - Susanna Temple - Dishonor for Matt Wayne
- 1958 Target - Once Too Often
- 1958 King Creole - Mimi Fisher
- 1957 Code 3 - Joan Hanley - The Killer
- 1957 Official Detective - Dope Peddler - Chainstore Hold-Ups
- 1955-1957 Science Fiction Theatre - Various Roles - The Strange Lodger (1957) - The Throwback (1956) - The Lost Heartbeat (1955)
- 1957 Circus Boy - Estelle - Big Top Angel
- 1957 Burden of Truth - Gloria
- 1957 Dr. Christian - Nurse Betty (Recurring role, 5 episodes)
- 1957 The Gray Ghost - Melinda - The Escape
- 1956 Sergeant Preston of the Yukon - Lou Anne Constantine - Eye of Evil
- 1956 The Man Called X - Underground
- 1956 Crossroads - Susan (Recurring role, 2 episodes)- Home Is the Sailor - The Strange Bequest
- 1956 The Life and Legend of Wyatt Earp - Mamie Perkins - Marshal Earp Plays Cupid
- 1955 It's a Great Life - Miss Brewster - The Private Line
- 1955 Screen Directors Playhouse - Cpl. Stella Baker - Want Ad Wedding
- 1955 Private Secretary - Barbara Lane - America's Sweethearts
- 1955 Tales of the Texas Rangers - Jeanie Warren - Ransom Flight
- 1955 The Lone Ranger - Ruth Foster - Framed for Murder
- 1955 The Man Behind the Badge - Helen - The Case of the Second Chance
- 1955 TV Reader's Digest - Louella - Around the Horn to Matrimony
- 1955 Stage 7 - Harriett - Down from the Stars
- 1955 Public Defender - Judy Parks - Cornered
- 1955 My Little Margie - Las Vegas Story
- 1955 The Loretta Young Show - Betsy - 600 Seconds
- 1955 Waterfront - Various Roles - Bait Cruise (1955) - Trestle Point - The Race
- 1954 The Adventures of Kit Carson - Various Roles - Outlaw's Justice - Trouble in Sundown
- 1954 Captain Midnight - Marcia Stanhope - The Walking Ghost
- 1954 Schlitz Playhouse - Natalie - Showdown at Sunset
- 1954 The Ford Television Theatre - The Tryst
- 1954 Death Valley Days - Elly - Yaller
- 1953 Sabre Jet - Betty Flanagan
- 1952 Fireside Theatre - Jill - The Broken Chord
