= Frank Waters =

American writer

- Born: July 25, 1902; Colorado Springs, Colorado
- Died: June 3, 1995 (aged 92); Arroyo Seco, New Mexico
- Occupation: Writer
- Spouse(s): Lois Moseley; Jane Somervell; Barbara Hayes
- Writing career
- Language: English
- Genres: Western fiction, history
- Subject: American Southwest
- Notable work: The Man Who Killed the Deer
- Website: www.frankwatersfoundation.org

Frank Waters (July 25, 1902 – June 3, 1995) was an American writer. He is known for his novels and historical works about the American Southwest. The Frank Waters Foundation, founded in his name, strives to foster literary and artistic achievement in the Southwest United States.

== Biography ==
Frank Waters was born on July 25, 1902, in Colorado Springs, Colorado to May Ione Dozier Waters and Frank Jonathon Waters. His father, who was part Cheyenne, was a key influence in Waters's interest in the Native American experience. Frank Jonathon Waters took his son on trips to the Navajo Reservation in New Mexico in 1911, described by Frank in his book The Colorado. Frank's interest in his Indian roots was partially a reaction to his father's death on December 20, 1914, when young Frank was 12 years old.

Waters continued his education at Colorado College in Colorado Springs. He studied engineering but left school before receiving a degree. Immediately after leaving college, Waters took a job with the Southern California Telephone Company, working in Los Angeles and the surrounding area. He remained employed there as an engineer and traffic chief until 1935. Between 1925 and 1935, Waters worked on his first novel, Fever Pitch (1930) and a series of autobiographical novels beginning with The Wild Earth's Nobility (1935). In 1936, Waters left L.A. and moved back and forth between Colorado and New Mexico, continuing to write and completing a biography of W. S. Stratton, Midas of the Rockies. He became a close friend of Mabel Dodge Luhan and her husband from Taos Pueblo, Tony Luhan.

When World War II broke out, Waters moved to Washington, D.C. to work for the Office of the Coordinator of Inter-American Affairs. There, he performed the duties of a propaganda analyst and chief content officer and, although he was released from the army in 1943, he continued to work for the Office of the Coordinator of Inter-American Affairs. Waters's masterpiece, The Man Who Killed the Deer, was published in 1942.

While living in D.C. in 1944, Waters married Lois Moseley, whom he divorced two years later. After his divorce, Waters moved to Taos, New Mexico, where he continued to write. In 1947, he purchased property at nearby Arroyo Seco, New Mexico, and married Jane Somervell. He served as editor-in-chief of Taos's bilingual newspaper, El Crepúsculo from 1949 to 1951, and as a reviewer for the Saturday Review of Literature from 1950 to 1956.

In 1953, Waters was awarded the Taos Artists Award for Notable Achievement in the Art of Writing. Waters held positions as information consultant for Los Alamos Scientific Laboratory, New Mexico, and for the City of Las Vegas, Nevada, (1952–1956). He held a variety of other jobs, including writer for C.O. Whitney Motion Picture Co., Los Angeles (1957), writer-in-residence at Colorado State University, Fort Collins (1966); and director, New Mexico Arts Commission, Santa Fe, New Mexico, (1966–68).

On December 23, 1979, Waters married Barbara Hayes (born Barbara Ann Hyne). He continued to write and make public appearances. He and his wife lived alternately in Arroyo Seco and Sedona, Arizona. Frank Waters died at his home in Arroyo Seco on June 3, 1995. Barbara died on January 11, 2015.

From the 1930s on, Waters published numerous novels, articles and non-fiction works. In 1975, he wrote Mexico Mystique: The Coming Sixth World of Consciousness. In the book, he makes the case that December 24, 2011, a date he got from Michael Coe's The Maya (1966), will be the closing date of the Mayan Long Count cycle and would initiate a new wave of human consciousness.

== Frank Waters Foundation ==
The Frank Waters Foundation, established in 1993, is a nonprofit organization whose primary goal is to promote the arts, specifically those in the spirit of the creativity of Frank Waters. The members of the foundation operate under the motto "Sheltering the creative spirit", by providing residencies for artists, musicians, and writers to work for short periods of time. The foundation holds workshops, readings, and exhibits, in addition to publishing. The foundation is supported financially by workshops, lectures, art shows, musical events, fundraisers, and sales of various items including books and bronze sculptures of Frank Waters and by income generated by the works of Frank Waters.

== Works ==
=== Novels ===
- Fever Pitch (1930), reprinted as Lizard Woman ISBN 0804009872, 978-0804009874
- The Wild Earth's Nobility (1935) ISBN 9780804010474
- Below Grass Roots (1937) ISBN 9780804010481
- Dust Within the Rock (1940) ISBN 9780804010498
- People of the Valley (1941) ISBN 0804002436, 978-0804002431
- The Man Who Killed the Deer (1942) ISBN 9780804001946, 978-0804001946
- River Lady (1942, w/Houston Branch)
- The Yogi of Cockroach Court (1947) ASIN B0007EBJ7C
- Diamond Head (1948 w/Houston Branch)
- The Woman at Otowi Crossing (1965)
- Pike's Peak (1972), revision and condensation of The Wild Earth's Nobility, Below Grass Roots, and Dust Within the Rock.ISBN 0804010471, 978-0804010474
- Flight from Fiesta (1986) ISBN 9780804008914, 978-0804008914

=== Other works ===
- Midas of the Rockies (1937)
- The Colorado (1946)
- Masked Gods: Navajo and Pueblo Ceremonialism (1950)
- The Earp Brothers of Tombstone: the Story of Mrs. Virgil Earp (1960)
- Book of The Hopi (1963)
- Robert Gilruth (1963)
- Leon Gaspard (1964)
- Pumpkin Seed Point (1969)
- To Possess the Land: A Biography of Arthur Rochford Manby (1973)
- Mexico Mystique: The Coming Sixth World of Consciousness (1975)
- Mountain Dialogues (1981)
- Brave Are My People: Indian Heroes Not Forgotten (1993)
- Of Time and Change: a Memoir (1998)
