= Helena Carter =

American actress (1923–2000)

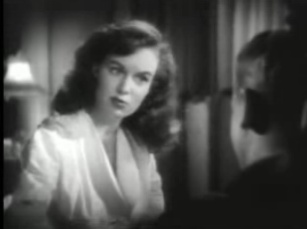
- Helena Carter in the trailer for Kiss Tomorrow Goodbye (1950)
- Born: Helen Jean Ruckert; August 24, 1923; New York City, U.S.
- Died: January 11, 2000 (aged 76); Culver City, Los Angeles, California
- Education: Hunter College; Columbia University
- Spouse: Michael Meshekoff (1953–1997)
- Children: 1

Helena Carter (born Helen Jean Ruckert; August 24, 1923 – January 11, 2000) was an American film actress in the 1940s and 1950s who is best known for her work in the film Invaders from Mars as Dr. Patricia Blake. From 1947 to 1953 she would appear in 13 films, during which time she also worked as a model.

== Early years ==
Carter was born in New York City. She graduated from Hunter College and attended graduate school at Columbia University, studying for a teaching degree. She later said her ambition was to be a teacher and marry a college professor.

During this period she worked as a fashion model, which led to her becoming a cover girl. She first modeled sports clothes at Conover, where she became friends with Betsy Drake.

== Film ==
Carter was visiting friends at Universal Studios when spotted by producer Leonard Goldstein. Universal signed her to a seven-year contract in 1946. "I just happened to visit the studio at a good time, I guess", she later said.

Her first film role was a small part in Time Out of Mind in 1947, which starred Ella Raines and Phyllis Calvert. According to Filmink "Carter has poise and beauty, but her inexperience is most evident in her speaking voice – she enunciates like someone who has been to finishing school. However, she already demonstrates what would be more notable attributes – her beauty, spark and intelligence, and her ability to focus her eyes on the person she was performing a scene with."

Universal put Carter in Something in the Wind (1948) with Deanna Durbin. In April 1947 she was loaned out for Intrigue (1948), her biggest part yet, billed third after George Raft and June Havoc. According to Filmink her performance in the latter "helped establish what would be her stock in trade character – a good girl sexually attracted to the bad boy hero; moral, but not a stick in the mud; intelligent and spirited."

Back at Universal she was in River Lady (1948) vying with Yvonne de Carlo for Rod Cameron. That film was shot in July 1947. She did not work again until June 1948. In August 1949 Hedda Hopper reported that Carter became "a little difficult to handle after her first picture. She turned down a part in an Abbott and Costello film, and got the silent treatment from the studio for the year. She finally saw the light, started co operating."

The film that brought her back was being cast as Douglas Fairbanks Jr's love interest in The Fighting O'Flynn (1949), made for Fairbanks' company but released through Universal. Fairbanks took an option on her for two more films. In 1948, she appeared on the cover of Life.

In June 1948 she told an interviewer, "Cameras don't frighten me even if I have freckles. But I still talk too fast. Sound men tear their hair out when I speak my first words in a picture. They are polite but very firm as they say, between clenched teeth, 'Slow down, Miss Carter, slow down.'"

=== Conflict with Universal ===
Carter turned down the part of Richard Long's wife in Ma and Pa Kettle in October 1948; Meg Randall played the role. In November Hedda Hopper reported that Carter wanted out of her Universal contract six months ago, and would get it if she paid back all the salary she had received since September. Hopper reported that the studio got enough money out of her loan outs to Fairbanks and Raft to cover two years of her pay. Filmink suggested Carter knew how good she was and wanted better roles. But Universal executives weren't about to let any uppity ex model college grad tell them what to do and slapped her down."

However, she stayed with Universal. In July 1949 Carter replaced Dolores Hart in East of Java which became South Sea Sinner (1951). Carter and Shelley Winters reportedly feuded on set, although both denied it. She followed it with the female lead in Double Crossbones (1950), a comedy with Donald O'Connor.

=== Final Films ===
In April 1950, James Cagney and his brother, producer William Cagney, borrowed her for Kiss Tomorrow Goodbye (1950), made by William Cagney Productions for Warner Bros. The same month she was reportedly reading for the role of Roxanne in Cyrano de Bergerac (1950), although the role ultimately went to the teenaged Mala Powers. Carter supported Randolph Scott in the 1951 western Fort Worth.

William Cagney used her again in Bugles in the Afternoon (1952) with Ray Milland. Sam Katzman used her in The Golden Hawk (1952) and The Pathfinder (1952). Carter's final film role was in 1953 when she starred in William Cameron Menzies' sci-fi thriller Invaders from Mars. As pointed out by Filmink "For the first time in her entire career, Carter played something other than a love interest for the male lead."

She retired following her second marriage.

== Personal life ==
Carter married twice, the first ending in divorce. On December 31, 1953, she married the film producer Michael Meshekoff, with whom she would remain until his death in 1997.

== Death ==
Carter died at age 76 in Los Angeles, California, on January 11, 2000.

== Filmography ==
| Year | Title | Role | Notes |
|---|---|---|---|
| 1947 | Time Out of Mind | Dora Drake | |
| 1947 | Something in the Wind | Clarissa Prentice | |
| 1947 | Intrigue | Linda Parker | |
| 1948 | River Lady | Stephanie Morrison | |
| 1949 | The Fighting O'Flynn | Lady Benedetta | |
| 1950 | Kiss Tomorrow Goodbye | Margaret Dobson | |
| 1950 | South Sea Sinner | Margaret Landis | |
| 1951 | Double Crossbones | Lady Sylvia Copeland | |
| 1951 | Fort Worth | Amy Brooks | |
| 1952 | Bugles in the Afternoon | Josephine Russell | |
| 1952 | The Golden Hawk | Blanca de Valdiva | |
| 1952 | The Pathfinder | Alison | |
| 1953 | Invaders from Mars | Dr. Patricia Blake | |
