= Bugles in the Afternoon =

1952 film by Roy Rowland

- Original film poster
- Directed by: Roy Rowland
- Screenplay by: Daniel Mainwaring (as Geoffrey Homes); Harry Brown
- Based on: novel by Ernest Haycox
- Produced by: William Cagney
- Starring: Ray Milland; Helena Carter; Hugh Marlowe; Forrest Tucker
- Cinematography: Wilfred M. Cline
- Edited by: Thomas Reilly
- Music by: Dimitri Tiomkin
- Color process: Technicolor
- Production company: William Cagney Productions
- Distributed by: Warner Bros. Pictures
- Release dates: February 28, 1952 (Salt Lake City); March 4, 1951 (New York)
- Running time: 85 minutes
- Country: United States
- Language: English
- Box office: $1.5 million (U.S. rentals)

Bugles in the Afternoon is a 1952 American Western film produced by William Cagney, directed by Roy Rowland and starring Ray Milland, Helena Carter, Hugh Marlowe and Forrest Tucker. The story, based on a 1943 novel by Ernest Haycox, features the Battle of the Little Big Horn.

== Plot ==
U.S. Cavalry officer Capt. Kern Shafter is court-martialed for stabbing fellow officer Lt. Edward Garnett with a saber. Shafter claims to have been defending the honor of his fiancée. The court-martial finds Shafter guilty, and he is cashiered from the army.

Shafter drifts and then enlists in the army as a private in the 7th Cavalry at Fort Abraham Lincoln in the Dakota Territory. On the trip there, he meets Josephine Russell. Shafter is assigned to a company commanded by old friend and former sergeant major Capt. Myles Moylan, and is given the rank of sergeant. Shafter learns that Lt. Garnett is also at Fort Lincoln and is now a captain and commander of one of its companies.

Shafter befriends Private Donovan, who was formerly a sergeant until he punched a sergeant major. The men are assigned to investigate the murder of local miners by Sioux Indian tribesmen, leading to a dangerous encounter. After Moylan begins to realize that Garnett is deliberately placing Shafter at risk, Moylan attempts to clear Shafter.

The feud escalates when Shafter discovers that Garnett is interested in Josephine. Unaware of the history between the men or of Garnett's true character, Josephine feels that Shafter should be dealing with issues more reasonably. She is angered when Shafter strikes Garnett.

The soldiers leave with Lt. Col. George Armstrong Custer to engage the Sioux. Garnett deliberately places Shafter, Donovan and another soldier in danger by sending them on a scouting mission, claiming that there are no Sioux warriors in the vicinity, despite having seen them through his binoculars. The men see their company retreat as they discover a large Sioux war party in their scouting area. After his friend Donovan is fatally wounded, Shafter returns to his command, only to witness Custer's entire command killed in battle. Garnett pursues Shafter during another skirmish with the Sioux, and the men scuffle until Shafter is knocked unconscious by Garnett. Just as Garnett is about to drop a large rock on Shafter, a Sioux warrior fatally shoots him. Moylan arrives and kills the warrior and informs Shafter that he saw the end of the fight with Garnett. The men regroup with their command to fight the Sioux, but Shafter is shot during the battle.

Shafter and Moylan survive. Thanks to Moylan, Shafter's reputation and rank of captain are restored, and Josephine now sees Shafter as the man whom she wants.

== Cast ==
- Ray Milland as Sgt. Kern Shafter
- Helena Carter as Josephine Russell
- Hugh Marlowe as Capt. Edward Garnett
- Forrest Tucker as Pvt. Donovan
- Barton MacLane as Capt. Myles Moylan
- George Reeves as Lt. Smith
- James Millican as 1st Sgt. Hines
- Gertrude Michael as May
- Stuart Randall as Bannack Bill
- William Phillips as Tinney
- Hugh Beaumont as Lt. Cooke (uncredited)
- Walter Coy as Capt. Benteen (uncredited)
- Charles Evans as Gen. Terry (uncredited)
- Sheb Wooley as Custer (uncredited)

== Production ==
The film is based on a novel by Ernest Haycox that was serialized in 1944 issues of The Saturday Evening Post.

In May 1944, William Cagney purchased the screen rights to the story, intending it as a vehicle for his brother James Cagney. In August 1944, Ring Lardner Jr. was assigned to write the script.

The film was intended to follow James Cagney's Blood on the Sun (1945), but it was shelved when he instead elected to star in The Time of Your Life.

By March 1949, William Cagney signed a three-picture deal with Warner Bros. In September 1950, he announced that Harry Brown was writing the script. In February 1951, Warner Bros., which hoped that Errol Flynn would play the lead, announced that Brown and Geoffrey Home had written the script and that filming would begin in May. In April, Roy Rowland, who had signed a long-term deal with Cagney Productions, was slated to direct. He visited Utah to scout locations.

In April, Ray Milland was announced as the film's star, with Helena Carter, David Brian and Robert Preston also cast. However, Brian refused to appear in the film and was suspended. He was replaced by Hugh Marlowe, borrowed from Twentieth Century-Fox. Ward Bond, who had been cast as Sgt. Hines, withdrew to instead appear in The Quiet Man and was replaced by James Millican. Forrest Tucker joined the cast by June, presumably in the role intended for Preston.

Filming took place in June 1951. Parts of the film were shot in Johnson Canyon, Long Canyon, Asay Creek, Kanab Canyon, Aspen Mirror Lake and Strawberry Valley in Utah. More than 200 residents of the area around southern Utah and northern Arizona appear in the film as extras. In late June, the unit returned from Utah.

== Release ==
The film's world premiere was held at the Utah Theater in Salt Lake City, Utah on February 18, 1952. Ray Milland attended the premiere and was presented with a silver cavalry bugle as a gift from the state to Jack Warner in gratitude for the production of two recent Warner Bros. films in Utah, Bugles in the Afternoon and The Lion and the Horse, which had not yet been released.

== Reception ==
In a contemporary review for The New York Times, critic Howard Thompson called the film "a rickety and transparent effort" and wrote: "Whatever the dynamics of the Ernest Haycox novel of the title, here is a slow-baked series of rough-and-ready cliches, with a few battle flourishes added as proof, apparently, that Mr. Cagney didn't stint on the budget. ... [A] generally unimaginative scenario. written by Geoffrey Homes and Harry Brown, retelling an already time-worn tale, has been poked along with such leaden pretentiousness by director Roy Fowland that this film should be given back to tile Indians. And judging by the expressions of the contributing Sioux, they want no part of it."
