= Intrigue (1947 film) =

1947 film by Edwin L. Marin

- Theatrical film poster
- Directed by: Edwin L. Marin
- Screenplay by: George F. Slavin; Barry Trivers
- Produced by: Samuel Bischoff
- Starring: George Raft; June Havoc; Helena Carter
- Cinematography: Lucien N. Andriot
- Edited by: George M. Arthur
- Color process: Black and white
- Production company: Star Films
- Distributed by: United Artists
- Release date: October 15, 1947
- Running time: 90 minutes
- Country: United States
- Language: English

Intrigue is a 1947 American film noir crime film directed by Edwin L. Marin and starring George Raft, June Havoc and Helena Carter. Intrigue was intended to be the first of a number of films Raft made, with producer Sam Bischoff, for his own production company, Star Films. It was one of several movies Raft made with Marin.

== Plot ==
In post-war China, court-martialed pilot Brad Dunham (George Raft) now flies smuggled goods into the country. He attempts to force his immediate superior, Ramon Perez (Marvin Miller), to pay him more, but Perez resists, so Brad steals the cargo back.

The boss of the black-market operation is Tamara Baranoff (June Havoc), who agrees to Brad's demand of a 50% cut of the operation and fires Ramon as a show of good faith. Meanwhile, an American newspaper reporter, Marc Andrews (Tom Tully), a friend of Brad's, shows up in Shanghai to investigate black-market crime.

Brad meets a social worker, Linda Arnold (Helena Carter), and their friendship makes Tamara jealous. She insists that Brad do something about the prying reporter and steer clear of that other woman. Tamara's criminal rival tips off Marc that his pal Brad is involved with the crime ring.

Marc is knifed by Tamara's rival just as he is delivering a copy of his story exposing the black market. His dying wish is that Brad deliver the story for him, telling Brad that it was Tamara whose testimony led to Brad's unjust court-martial.

Brad distributes her black-market goods to needy citizens. Ramon turns up to ambush Brad, but his gun goes off, killing Tamara instead, and Ramon is placed under arrest. Brad and Linda contemplate a new life together.

== Cast ==
- George Raft as Brad Dunham
- June Havoc as Mme. Tamara Baranoff
- Helena Carter as Linda Parker, alias Linda Arnold
- Tom Tully as Marc Andrews
- Marvin Miller as Ramon Perez
- Dan Seymour as Karidian
- Jay C. Flippen as Mike, the bartender (as J.C. Flippen)
- Philip Ahn as Louie Chin (as Phillip Ahn)
- Charles Lane as Hotel Desk Clerk
- Marc Krah as Nicco
- Nancy Hsueh as Mia, orphan girl
- Nan Wynn as Dinner Club Singer ['Intrigue']
- Peter Chong as Editor
- Michael Ansara as Ramon's Radio Man

== Production ==
In September 1946 George Raft announced he was forming his own production company, Star Films Inc, in association with Sam Bischoff. This company expected to make three films over two years at a budget of $3,500,000. The same month, Bischoff signed a four picture deal with United Artists – three of the movies would star Raft and the fourth would be Pitfall (1948) (which wound up starring Dick Powell). Biscoff obtained $5 million credit from the Bank of America to make these films.

In February 1947 Bischoff announced the first film he would make with Raft under the four picture deal would be Intrigue based on an original story by George Slavin. Slavin's story was inspired by his observations in the Pacific War, where he served with the RAF and American Air Force.

Edwin Marin signed to direct in February 1947 by which stage Slavin and Barry Triven were working on a script. Bischoff wanted Gloria Swanson to play the femme fetale role. The role eventually went to June Havoc. Helena Carter was borrowed from Universal-International.

Bischoff had a credit line of $5 million to make the films. (Note: Although Intrigue was billed as the first of the Samuel Bischoff/George Raft films to be produced, no other films were made by that company.)

The plot of Intrigue was originally meant to involve smuggling blood plasma, but this was changed to whisky and cigarettes at the request of Chinese-American organizations. Raft regretted this change. "If we had been able to retain the original idea it would have been a lot more exciting", he said. Principal photography took place from April 28 to mid-June 1947.

=== Shooting ===
Filming on Intrigue started 28 April 1947 and continued until mid-June, 1947. It was June Havoc's first film since 1944.

Raft was hospitalised with illness during the Intrigue shoot.

== Reception ==
=== Critical ===
In his review of Intrigue for The New York Times, Thomas M. Pryor considered the film a "conventional exercise in screen melodramatics " and George Raft's role as "... all so much wasted effort on his part for no one could possibly inject any semblance of verisimilitude into the hopeless botch of incident [sic] which Barry Trivers and George Slavin set to paper under the impression that they were writing a screen play."

The Los Angeles Times called it "an intense melodrama which offers George Raft one of his best roles."

Filmink wrote an appreciation of Helena Carter which referred to this movie saying her performance "helped establish what would be her stock in trade character – a good girl sexually attracted to the bad boy hero; moral, but not a stick in the mud; intelligent and spirited. She's fully present and focused in her scenes with Raft – her eyes are alive, interested, alert; she's aware, not naive, nobody's fool. The film would have been far better off with more of her and less of the self-righteous reporter... who is going to expose Raft."

== Radio adaptation ==
On May 10, 1948, George Raft and June Havoc reprised their film roles in Intrigue with a 60-minute radio adaptation of the film for a Lux Radio Theater broadcast.

== Star Films ==
Star Films would later make Outpost in Morocco (1949). They announced plans for Mississippi Gambler and a film about Panama written by Robert Graves. The latter two films were not made and neither was another announced project, The French Secret Service. However Raft later appeared in A Bullet for Joey for Bischoff, starring with Edward G. Robinson for the second time.

== See also ==
- List of American films of 1947
