= Steve Canyon (TV series) =

American television series (1958–1959)

- Genre: Drama
- Written by: Sidney Carroll; Joseph Landon
- Directed by: Don Taylor; Ted Post
- Music by: Walter Schumann; Nathan Scott; Gil Grau
- No. of episodes: 34

Original release
- Release: September 13, 1958 – June 2, 1959

Steve Canyon is an American television series that ran from September 13, 1958 to September 8, 1959. The show was produced by David Haft and Michael Meshekoff. The series was based on the comic strip of the same name by Milton Caniff.

== Premise ==
Steve Canyon was an air force command pilot who traveled around the country, from base to base. Eventually, Steve settles down as commander of the Big Thunder Air Force Base, although he still travels the world on special assignments.

== Cast ==
- Dean Fredericks as Lt. Col. Stevenson B. Canyon
- Ted DeCorsia as Police Chief Hagedorn
- Jerry Paris as Major "Willie" Williston
- Abel Fernandez as Airman Abel Featherstone
- Robert Hoy as Sgt. Charley Berger
- Ingrid Goude as Ingrid

=== Guest stars ===
- Karl Lukas
- Wynn Pearce

== Episodes ==
No.	Title	Directed by	Written by	Original release date
1	"Operation Towline"	Ted Post	Story by : Milton Caniff; Teleplay by : Joseph Landon & Shelly Colbert	September 13, 1958
Guest cast: Harry Townes, Susan Alexander, Paul Frees, Morgan Woodward, Sidney Clute, Dan Barton, Ray Montgomery
2	"Operation Thunderbirds"	Don Taylor	Story by : Sidney Carroll; Teleplay by : Norman Katkov	September 20, 1958
Guest cast: Larry Pennell, Ronnie Knox, Burt Metcalfe, Ken Hardison, Michael Ferrall, Joe di Reda, Barry McGuire, Gail Land, Jo Ann Wade, Barbara Wilson, Gloria Robertson, Marion Collier
3	"Operation Zero Launch"	Don Taylor	Sidney Carroll	September 27, 1958
Guest cast: Ward Wood, Marion Ross, Doro Merande, Nelson Leigh, Doug Wilson, Mike McCoy
4	"Project Heartbeat"	Don Taylor	Story by : Sidney Carroll; Teleplay by : Robert L. Green	October 4, 1958
Guest cast: Russell Johnson, Jacqueline Scott, John Doucette, Jason Wingreen, Cindy Robbins, Morris Erby
5	"Operation Jettison"	Don Taylor	Unknown	October 11, 1958
6	"Operation Survival"	Unknown	Unknown	October 25, 1958
7	"Fear of Flying"	Andrew McCullough	Joseph Landon	November 1, 1958
Guest cast: Philip Abbott, Robert Brubaker, Donald Freed, Tom Middleton, Robert DeCost, Richard Benedict, Morgan Jones, bill Lechner, Ike Gibson, Dorsey Keaton
8	"Operation Moby Dick"	Unknown	Unknown	November 8, 1958
9	"Operation B-52"	Unknown	Unknown	November 15, 1958
10	"Operation Mushroom"	Don Taylor	Unknown	November 29, 1958
11	"Operation Crash Landing"	Unknown	Unknown	December 6, 1958
12	"Pilot Error"	Unknown	Unknown	December 13, 1958
13	"The Gift"	Don Taylor	Ray Bradbury (teleplay); Ray Bradbury and Sidney Carroll (story)	December 20, 1958
14	"Operation Diplomat"	Unknown	Unknown	December 27, 1958
15	"Operation Big Thunder"	Unknown	Unknown	January 3, 1959
16	"Operation Nose Wheel"	Unknown	Unknown	January 8, 1959
17	"The Search"	Lamont Johnson	Unknown	January 15, 1959
18	"The Prisoner"	Unknown	Unknown	January 22, 1959
19	"Operation Souvenir"	Lamont Johnson	Unknown	January 29, 1959
20	"The Fight"	Unknown	Unknown	February 5, 1959
21	"The Robbery"	Unknown	Unknown	February 19, 1959
22	"Blackmail"	Unknown	Unknown	February 26, 1959
23	"Iron Curtain"	Unknown	Unknown	March 5, 1959
24	"The Bomb"	Unknown	Unknown	March 12, 1959
25	"The Sergeant"	Unknown	Unknown	March 26, 1959
26	"Operation Intercept"	Athur Marks	Unknown	March 31, 1959
27	"The Muller Story"	Unknown	Unknown	April 7, 1959
28	"Strike Force"	Unknown	Unknown	April 14, 1959
29	"The Trap"	Unknown	Unknown	April 21, 1959
30	"The Korean Story"	Unknown	Unknown	April 28, 1959
31	"Room 313"	Lamont Johnson	Unknown	May 5, 1959
32	"Project U.F.O."	Unknown	Unknown	May 19, 1959
33	"Sabotage"	Unknown	Unknown	May 26, 1959
34	"Operation Firebee"	Unknown	Unknown	June 2, 1959

== Broadcast ==
Steve Canyon aired Saturday night from 9:00–9:30 on NBC. In January 1958, it moved to Thursdays, from 8:00–8:30, and from March 1959 it aired Tuesdays from 8:00–8:30.
