= Herb Meadow =

American television and writer

- Born: Herman Meadow; May 27, 1911; Brooklyn, New York, United States
- Died: March 1, 1995 (aged 83); Los Angeles, United States
- Occupations: Writer, producer

Herb Meadow (May 27, 1911 – March 1, 1995) was an American television producer and writer, born 1911 in Brooklyn, New York, best known for creating such series as Have Gun – Will Travel.

== Early years ==
Meadow grew up in Brooklyn. A ninth-grade school dropout, he was a runner for a gangster and bootlegger during the Prohibition Era. In addition to selling sheet music and jewelry and working at an art supply business.

== Career ==
When he was in his 20s, Meadow worked in radio in New York. In 1933, he became an actor, announcer, and writer at WCNW in New York. He later became a writer in the old-time radio era, creating 350 scripts for the soap opera Valiant Lady.

Meadow worked in Hollywood for more than 50 years. At age 83, he was still active, writing a screenplay that resulted in a $500,000 contract. He wrote at least 37 feature-length film scripts, of which a dozen were produced, including The Redhead from Wyoming, The Strange Woman, Stranger on Horseback, and The Unguarded Moment.

On television, in addition to Have Gun – Will Travel, Meadow created and wrote for The Man from Blackhawk and developed the Arrest and Trial series. In 1960, he signed a deal with CBS Films to handle production of network properties, but never came to fruition.

Despite his many scripts, he would write only one book Uncertain Glory, a novelization of the screenplay by László Vadnay & Max Brand from the screenstory by Brand and Joe May (Grosset and Dunlap, 1944).

== Personal life ==
Meadow was married twice. His first wife died in 1980, ending their 43-year marriage. His second marriage ended in divorce after six years, but the two continued to cohabit.

== Death ==
Meadow died of a heart attack in 1995 in Los Angeles.
