= River Lady =

1948 film by George Sherman

- Theatrical release poster
- Directed by: George Sherman
- Screenplay by: D.D. Beauchamp; William Bowers
- Based on: novel by Houston Branch and Frank Waters
- Produced by: Leonard Goldstein
- Starring: Yvonne De Carlo; Dan Duryea & Rod Cameron
- Cinematography: Irving Glassberg
- Edited by: Otto Ludwig
- Music by: Paul Sawtell
- Color process: Technicolor
- Production company: Universal Pictures
- Distributed by: Universal Pictures
- Release date: June 1948
- Running time: 78 minutes
- Country: United States
- Language: English
- Budget: $1 million

River Lady is a 1948 American lumberjack Western film directed by George Sherman and starring Yvonne De Carlo and Dan Duryea. It was filmed on the Universal Studios Backlot.

== Plot ==
In the 1870s, in a logging town on the Mississippi River, a conflict exists between the people of a mill town and the lumberjacks who work downriver. Romance and deceit are catalyzed by the arrival of a riverboat casino named River Lady, owned by a beautiful woman called Sequin.

Bauvais, a representative of the local lumber syndicate and Sequin's business partner, is trying to convince H.L. Morrison, the mill owner, to sell his business. Morrison refuses, and Sequin eventually buys part of the struggling business in order to provide a reputable job for her boyfriend, Dan Corrigan, a lumberjack.

Dan eventually takes the job and he and Sequin become engaged. But, when Dan discovers that Sequin manipulated Morrison into giving him the job, he gets drunk and marries Stephanie, Morrison's daughter. Sparks fly between Morrison's business and Sequin's syndicate instigated by a vengeful Dan.

In the following battle, Bauvais is killed and Dan is shot. After the battle, Sequin visits a healing Dan and asks to get back together (Dan and Stephanie are separated). Dan tells Sequin he has actually fallen in love with his wife and wants to stay with her. On her way out of town forever, Sequin tells Stephanie that Dan wants her thereby reuniting the couple.

== Production ==
The film was based on the novel by Houston Branch and Frank Waters. The novel was published in 1942, the New York Times calling it a "first rate story with no apparent marks of collaboration on it."

Film rights were bought by Universal in March 1941 for a reported $50,000 plus 10 cents for every copy sold over 70,000. The sale was done even before the novel had been written, simply on the strength of its synopsis. The rights were purchased for the Frank Lloyd production unit at Universal, and the film was not able to be made until three months after publication of the novel. Lloyd wanted to make it with Loretta Young.

When Lloyd left the studio, Universal kept rights to the novel. In 1946 the project was re-activated when it was assigned to producing-writing team of Michael Fessier and Ernest Pagano. They said the stars would be Yvonne De Carlo and Rod Cameron, who had just appeared in Fessier-Pagano's Frontier Gal (1945).

The Hollywood Reporter reported that Ann Blyth was originally cast in River Lady, probably as "Stephanie Morrison", Helena Carter's character. De Carlo and Duryea had previously appeared together in the Universal film Black Bart, also directed by Sherman.

According to Universal press materials, the boat used in River Lady was originally built in 1929 for the silent version of Show Boat.

Filming started April 1947. Shot in Technicolor the film was one of Universal's most expensive productions of the year.

== Cast ==
- Yvonne De Carlo as Sequin
- Dan Duryea as Beauvais
- Rod Cameron as Dan Corrigan
- Helena Carter as Stephanie Morrison
- Lloyd Gough as Mike Riley
- Florence Bates as Ma Dunnegan
- John McIntire as H.L. Morrison
- Jack Lambert as Swede
- Esther Somers as Mrs. Morrison
- Anita Turner as Esther
- Edmund Cobb as Rider
- Dewey Robinson as Bouncer
- Eddy Waller as Hewitt
- Milton Kibbee as Limpy
- Billy Wayne as Dealer
- Paul Maxey as Mr. Miller (uncredited)
- Mickey Simpson as a Logger (uncredited)
- Dick Wessel as a Logger (uncredited)
- Robert J. Wilke (uncredited)

== Reception ==
Filmink magazine thought the best thing about the movie was Carter who played her part "with a twinkle in her eye, lively, full of spark and clearly intelligent… a good girl who wouldn't mind being "bad" for the right guy. She was no shy, retiring violet – she goes after Cameron actively, in part because it's a rebellious act and she's clearly sexually attracted to him – but she's no dummy either."

Universal announced they would team Duryea and de Carlo in a third film, Christmas Eve at Pilot Butte but it was never made.
