= Fort Worth (film) =

1951 film

- Theatrical release poster
- Directed by: Edwin L. Marin
- Written by: John Twist
- Produced by: Anthony Veiller
- Starring: Randolph Scott
- Cinematography: Sidney Hickox
- Edited by: Clarence Kolster
- Music by: David Buttolph
- Production company: Warner Bros. Pictures
- Distributed by: Warner Bros. Pictures
- Release date: July 14, 1951
- Running time: 80 minutes
- Country: United States
- Language: English
- Budget: $698,000
- Box office: $2,342,000 $1,450,000 (US rentals)

Fort Worth is a 1951 American Western film directed by Edwin L. Marin and starring Randolph Scott. It is Marin's final directing work, as he died two months before the release.

== Plot ==
Former gunfighter Ned Britt settles in Fort Worth, Texas as a newspaperman. He falls in love with Flora Talbot, the fiancée of his former friend Blair Lunsford. Britt tries to expose the crooked cattle baron Gabe Clevinger in his newspaper, but Clevinger employs violent means to prevent the arrival of the railroad at Fort Worth. Britt must rethink his journalistic methods to stop Clevinger, and soon resorts to violence himself.

Already well known as a newspaperman, Britt joins a wagon train headed for Texas, although his destination is San Antonio. Old flame Flora Talbot joins the group, headed for Fort Worth as the "intended" of leading citizen Blair Lunsford. Gabe Clevinger's cattle outfit camps near the wagon train, and slightly drunk cowhand Happy Jack Murphy challenges Britt to draw on him. An accidental shot is fired that stampedes Clevinger's cattle, and a small boy named Tobey is trampled to death. At the urging of Lunsford, Britt stays in Fort Worth to open a newspaper that will expose Clevinger. Clevinger is violently opposed to bringing the railroad into Fort Worth. If cattle can be shipped by train, it will end his monopoly on ground transportation. And he has an army of outlaws at his disposal.

Both Britt and his right-hand man, Garvin, are developing doubts about Lunsford's motives. Is he just using them to eliminate Lunsford's competition? Lunsford claims to be broke and only prosperity in Fort Worth can enable him to pay off large bank loans. But Garvin suspects that he is buying up land cheaply after Clevinger's terror tactics drive out settlers. While Britt is at Levinger's house, one of Clevinger's men murders Garvin in the newspaper office. The ineffectual town sheriff will do nothing. Britt yanks the Sheriff's gunbelt off and stalks three of Clevinger's men in the town square,killing them all.

Even as Lunsford saves Britt's life twice, suspicion grows. And he has killed so many of Clevinger's men "to make it look good" that Clevinger wants both men dead. A special train Lunsford has hired to woo railroad investors is attacked by Clevinger, frightening off the money men. So Lunsford recruits the townspeople to lay the track themselves. A story is "planted" that a large shipment of gold will be on a certain train, hoping to lure CLevinger into a trap. But Lunsford actually has $100,000.00 in cash on the train from the land grab. But when Clevinger's gang attacks, a fire starts that burns up the 100 thousand, and Lunsford locks Britt in the burning car to die. Britt escapes and confronts Lunsford at his ranch with Flora as a witness. In 24 hours, Britt will run an expose' of the land grab. He then waits in his office, armed for trouble.

This results in a four-cornered showdown where Britt kills Clevinger, and Lunsford is shot by both Clevinger and Flora. Scott chooses to believe that Clevinger's bullet was the fatal one. Months later, the railroad has arrived in Fort Worth, and Britt runs an editorial posthumously crediting Lunsford for Fort Worth's new prosperity. Flora and Britt are now married and expecting a child.

== Cast ==
- Randolph Scott as Ned Britt
- David Brian as Blair Lunsford
- Phyllis Thaxter as Flora Talbot
- Helena Carter as Amy Brooks
- Dickie Jones as Luther Wicks
- Ray Teal as Gabe Clevinger
- Michael Tolan as Mort Springer
- Emerson Treacy as Ben Garvin
- Bob Steele as Shorty
- Walter Sande as Deputy Waller
- Chubby Johnson as Sheriff
- Jack Mower as Railroad Backer (uncredited)
- Duke York as Outlaw(uncredited)
- Sheb Wooley as Outrider(uncredited)
- Zon Murray as Happy Jack Harvey(uncredited)
- Paul Picerni as Castro,Knife Murderer
- Pat Mitchell as Toby(uncredited)

== Reception ==
According to Warner Bros., records the film earned $1,735,000 domestically and $607,000 foreign.
