= The Fighting O'Flynn =

1949 film by Arthur Pierson

- U.S. window card poster
- Directed by: Arthur Pierson
- Written by: Douglas Fairbanks Jr. Robert Thoeren
- Based on: based on the novel and play "The O'Flynn" by Justin Huntly McCarthy
- Produced by: Douglas Fairbanks Jr.
- Starring: Douglas Fairbanks Jr. Helena Carter; Richard Greene
- Cinematography: Arthur Edeson
- Edited by: Russell F. Schoengarth
- Music by: Frank Skinner
- Production company: Fairbanks Company
- Distributed by: Universal Pictures
- Release date: February 22, 1949
- Running time: 93 minutes
- Country: United States
- Language: English

The Fighting O'Flynn is a 1949 American adventure film directed by Arthur Pierson. The film's screenplay by Douglas Fairbanks Jr. is based on the novel of the same name by Justin Huntly McCarthy. Fairbanks stars, along with Helena Carter.

== Plot ==
Nearing the end of the 18th century, Napoleon's vast army is sailing towards the Irish coast. The national poet and freedom fighter who goes by the name of "The O'Flynn" is traveling back to the castle where he was born, when he encounters a coach being robbed by rogues. The leader of the outlaws is a man named Hendrigg. The robbery fails thanks to O'Flynn's efforts. He invites the passenger, Lady Benedetta, to take refuge in his castle.

Lady Benedetta eventually agrees to take up the invitation from the elegant O'Flynn, who rode ahead to prepare the castle. When O'Flynn arrives at the castle, Dooley is waiting to arrest him for unpaid debts. O'Flynn gets off by telling the man of a treasure buried inside the castle.

O'Flynn is unaware that Lady Benedetta is really the daughter of the Viceroy of Ireland. She is in turn unaware that agents have been sent out by Napoleon to spy on her, disguised as travelers. They have been informed that Lady Benedetta has Napoleon's plans to invade Britain and is to deliver them to her father. Both Lady Benedetta and the agents arrive to the castle in the night.

Dooley fends off the agents and saves both Lady Benedetta and the unsuspecting O'Flynn. Napoleon's men attack them on their way to Dublin, but again they escape. They manage to give the plans to Lady Benedetta's father. Because of his leadership qualities, O'Flynn is made a captain in the Irish Army.

O'Flynn is attracted to Lady Benedetta, and when he finds out that her fiancé, Lord Sedgemouth, is in favor of Napoleon, he challenges his rival to a duel. Being a swordsman, he wins the duel quite easily, and decides to win Lady Benedetta's heart. The lord counters by letting Lady Benedetta believe that O'Flynn is involved with a courtesan named Fancy Free, which leads the lady to denounce him.

In battle, O'Flynn disguises himself as a deserter to get behind enemy lines. He is brought in front of Napoleon's general, Van Dronk, and they spend the night drinking together. When the general passes out, O'Flynn puts on his uniform and tries to steal the new plans for invading Britain. Unfortunately, one of the general's lieutenants recognizes him as an impostor and he is swiftly court-marshaled and sentenced to death. Luck is on his side when the firing squad misses, and he escapes unharmed. He hides in Lord Sedgemouth's tent, where the courtesan Fancy Free is also present. O'Flynn persuades Fancy to help him get the invading plans, but before they can, Lord Sedgemouth walks in on them and tries to shoot O'Flynn, who again manages to escape.

Lady Benedetta learns that Fancy is with lord Sedgemouth and goes to see O'Flynn. They kiss and O'Flynn goes on to claim that Lord Sedgemouth is a traitor who must be treated as such. He manages to make the French ships near the coast to turn back by signaling to them from ashore. Then he takes on Lord Sedgemouth at his castle and manage to defeat him with the help of the viceroy's men. After this, he kisses Lady Benedetta.

== Cast ==
- Douglas Fairbanks Jr. as The O'Flynn
- Helena Carter as Lady Benedetta
- Richard Greene as Lord Philip Sedgemonth
- Patricia Medina as Fancy Free
- Arthur Shields as Dooley
- J.M. Kerrigan as Timothy
- Ludwig Donath as Hendrigg
- Lumsden Hare as the viceroy
- Otto Waldis as General van Dronk
- Henry Brandon as Lt. Corpe
- Harry Cording as Pat
- John Doucette as Jack
- Patrick O'Moore as Major Steele
- Al Ferguson as Footman (uncredited)

== Source Material ==
The movie was based on a play The O'Flynn by Justin Huntly McCarthy which premiered in 1910 starring Sir Herbert Tree. It was set in Ireland during the reign of William of Orange and dealt with the attempt of James II to retake his throne.

Huntly then adapted his play into a novel, which was published in 1910.

Huntly's novel If I Were King was turned into a popular musical The Vagabond King. In the late 1920s The O'Flynn was adapted into an operetta and there were several announcements that it would play on Broadway over the next few years. It eventually opened in 1934.

== Film Development ==
In 1946 Edward Small announced he had Robert Thoeren adapting a script from the book. The following year Douglas Fairbanks Jnr bought the rights to the novel and Thoren's script. Glynn Tyron was put to work on the script.

In December 1948 Universal announced the film would be part of its lineup for the following year. It was Fairbanks' third independent production.

Patricia Medina was borrowed from MGM. Her then husband Richard Greene was signed to play the villain.

The film was shot in five weeks.

== Reception ==
Filmink called it "a fun movie" where Carter plays "another good girl who looks like she wants to be naughty, a Maid Marian type, and Carter teams well with Fairbanks."

Fairbanks and Carter were going to work together again on The Caballero but the film was not made.

== Adaptation ==
An adaptation of the film was broadcast on the Screen Guild Players radio program on April 14, 1949. Douglas Fairbanks Jr. starred in the episode, and Helena Carter was featured.
