= The Pathfinder (1952 film) =

1952 film

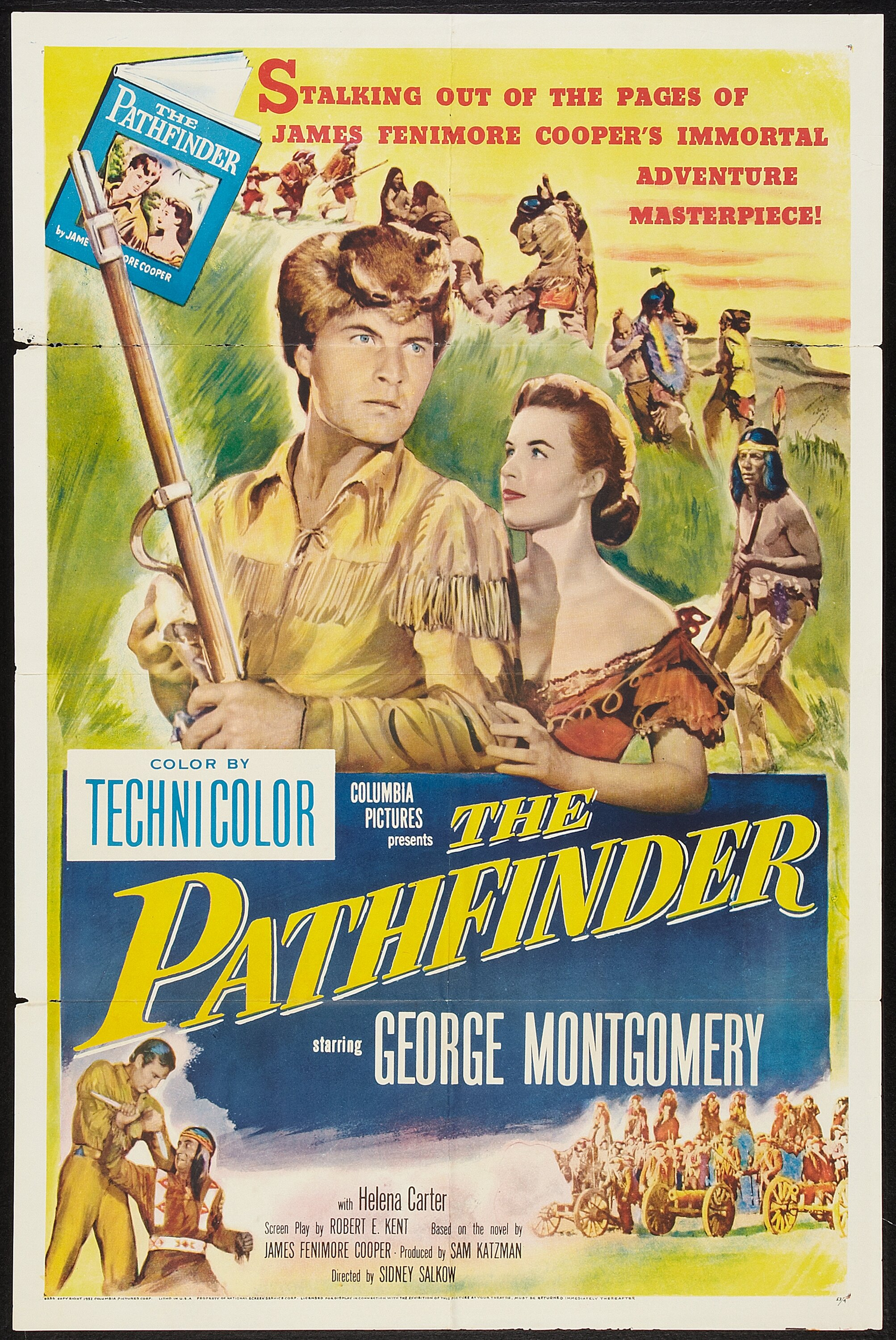
- Film poster
- Directed by: Sidney Salkow
- Screenplay by: Robert E. Kent
- Based on: The Pathfinder by James Fenimore Cooper
- Produced by: Sam Katzman
- Starring: George Montgomery; Helena Carter; Jay Silverheels
- Narrated by: Michael Fox
- Cinematography: Henry Freulich
- Edited by: Jerome Thoms
- Color process: Technicolor
- Production company: Sam Katzman Productions
- Distributed by: Columbia Pictures
- Release date: December 9, 1952
- Running time: 78 minutes
- Country: United States
- Language: English

The Pathfinder is a 1952 American adventure historical Western film directed by Sidney Salkow and starring George Montgomery, Helena Carter and Jay Silverheels. It is based on the 1840 novel The Pathfinder by James Fenimore Cooper and was produced by Sam Katzman for Columbia Pictures.

== Plot ==
At the beginning of the French and Indian War in 1754, the Mingo Indians allied to the French massacre the Mohican tribe allied to British. Pathfinder and Chingachgook discover the only survivor, a child named Uncas. Angered that the British did not protect their allies the Mohicans, Pathfinder gains entry to the British fort and threatens the Scottish commander Colonel Duncannon until it is discovered that the British were unaware due to a Mohican messenger being killed before he could bring the news.

Colonel Duncannon enlists Pathfinder and Chingachgook to spy for the British by posing as French sympathisers. When Pathfinder says they would not be able to discover the plans of the French as they do not speak their language the Colonel assigns Alison, a fluent French speaker to them. Pathfinder is dismayed that Alison is a woman but she earns her place by killing a Mingo with a pistol and infiltrating French society when they arrive at the French fort. Alison discovers that the French have built a road along a mountain pass bringing supplies to the main French port that has a harbour for ships. Blowing up the mountain road with black powder would deny supplies to the French fort meaning all their smaller outposts would fall to the British due to a scarcity of provisions.

Alison came to the North American colonies to marry an English Captain who disgraced himself through alcoholism. She unexpectedly meets him again as he has turned renegade, married a Mingo princess and has a commission in the French army.

Pathfinder and Chingachgook find out that the French commander has all his plans of defense in his office, so they create a distraction for the soldiers, and sneak into the office. They find the plans, and Chingachgook sneaks out of the window with the plans. But then the English renegade catches Pathfinder and denounces he and Alison as spies, and they are sentenced to be shot at dawn.

At dawn, Pathfinder escapes from his cell, as Chingachgook arrives with British soldiers who attack the fort and force the French to surrender.

== Cast ==
- George Montgomery as Pathfinder
- Helena Carter as Welcome Alison
- Jay Silverheels as Chingachgook
- Walter Kingsford Col. Duncannon
- Rodd Redwing as Chief Arrowhead
- Stephen Bekassy as Col. Brasseau
- Elena Verdugo as Lokawa
- Bruce Lester as Capt. Clint Bradford
- Chief Yowlachie as Eagle Feather
- Lyle Talbot as French Ship Captain

== Production ==
Helena Carter had just made The Golden Horde for Katzman.
