= Mort Mills =

American actor (1919–1993)

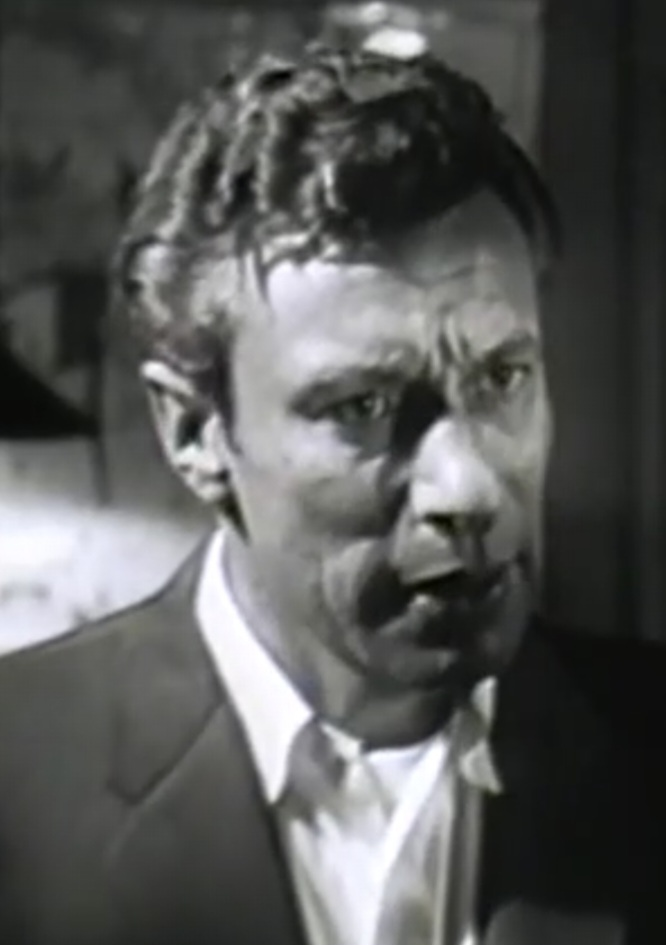
- Mills in an episode of Treasury Men in Action (1955)
- Born: Mortimer Morris Kaplan; January 11, 1919; New York, New York, US
- Died: June 6, 1993 (aged 74); Ventura, California, US
- Occupation: Actor
- Years active: 1952–1973
- Relatives: Mary Treen (cousin)

Mort Mills (born Mortimer Morris Kaplan; January 11, 1919 – June 6, 1993) was an American film and television actor who had roles in over 150 movies and television episodes. He was often the town lawman or the local bad guy in many popular westerns of the 1950s and 1960s.

From 1957–1959 he had a recurring co-starring role as Marshal Frank Tallman in Man Without a Gun. Other recurring roles were as Sergeant Ben Landro in the Perry Mason series and Sheriff Fred Madden in The Big Valley. He portrayed supporting roles in the Alfred Hitchcock films Psycho (1960) and Torn Curtain (1966), and in Orson Welles' Touch of Evil (1958).

== Biography ==
During World War II Mills served in the 3rd Marine Parachute Battalion in the Pacific.

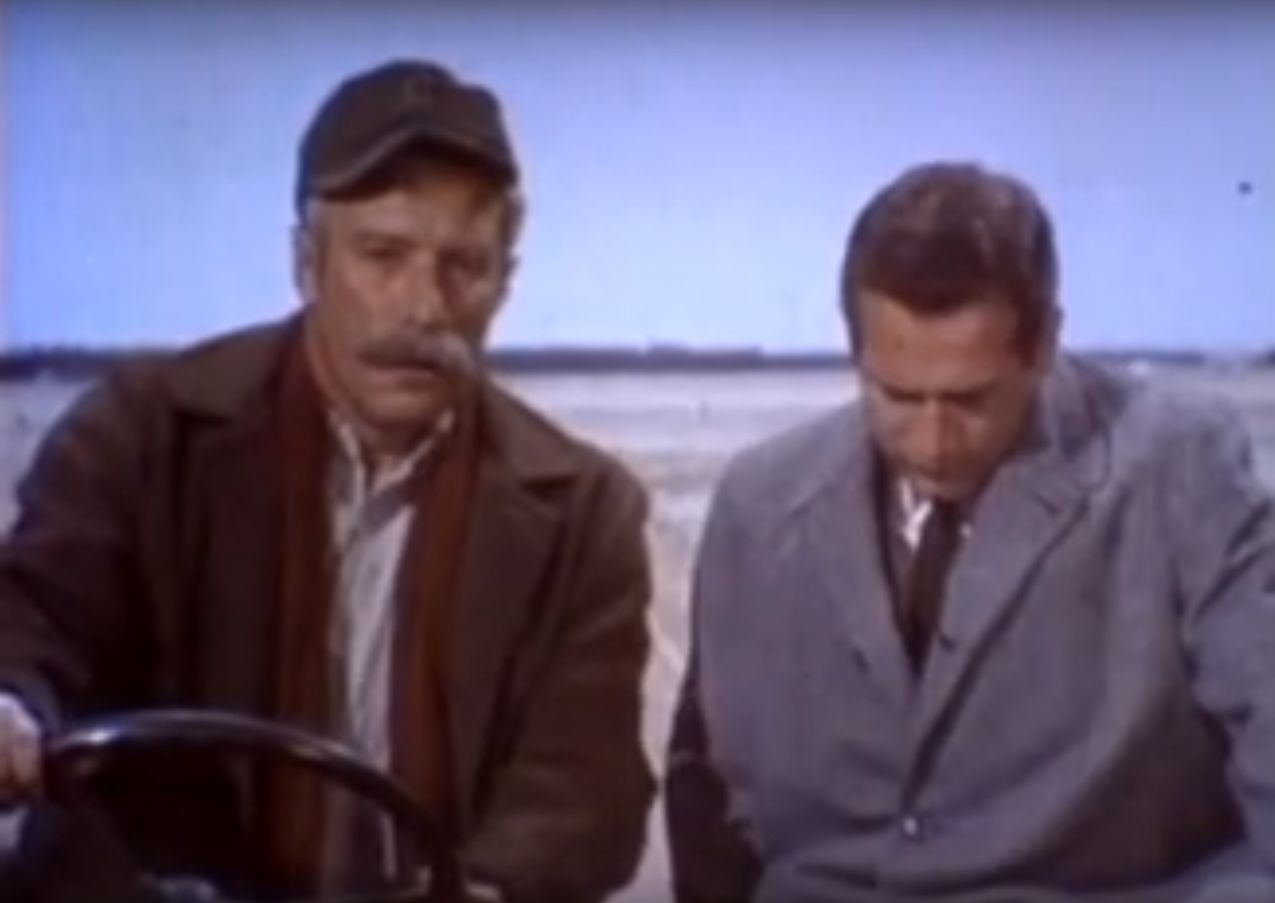
Mort Mills and Paul Newman in Torn Curtain (1966)

Though Mills did much television work, he also found regular work in motion pictures. He is probably best known as the suspicious highway patrolman who follows Marion Crane (Janet Leigh) in Alfred Hitchcock's classic thriller Psycho (1960). A few years later, he worked again with Hitchcock, playing a spy in East Germany under the cover of being a farmer in Hitchcock's Torn Curtain (1966) starring Paul Newman and Julie Andrews. Mills also appeared with Charlton Heston in Orson Welles's suspense classic Touch of Evil (1958).

In 1955, he appeared as Samuel Mason on ABC's Disneyland miniseries Davy Crockett starring Fess Parker. From 1957–1959, Mills co-starred with Rex Reason in the syndicated western series Man Without a Gun. He portrayed Marshal Frank Tallman. Reason played his friend, Adam MacLean, editor of the Yellowstone Sentinel newspaper. He appeared as villains twice in Maverick, first in 1957 with James Garner as Bret Maverick ("Day of Reckoning") and second in 1961 with Robert Colbert as Bret's brother Brent Maverick ("Benefit of Doubt"). In 1958, he guest starred as a particularly greedy bounty hunter who clashes with Steve McQueen's character Josh Randall in the CBS western series, Wanted: Dead or Alive. In 1961 he appeared as Jack Saunders in the TV western Lawman in the episode titled "Owny O'Reilly." In the 1965 Three Stooges film, The Outlaws Is Coming, Mills played Trigger Mortis.

Mills was a regular as police Lieutenant Bob Malone in Howard Duff's NBC-Four Star Television series, Dante (1960–1961), set at a San Francisco, California, nightclub called "Dante's Inferno". He appeared in eight episodes of Perry Mason, seven of them as Police Sgt. Ben Landro between 1961 and 1965.

His cousin, Mary Treen, was a film actress. In 1952, he and Mary, both registered Republicans, endorsed Dwight D. Eisenhower for president. He was Jewish and a parishoner of the Temple Israel of Hollywood.

== Death ==
Mills died June 6, 1993. It was first reported he had been smoking in bed, and died in the fire. After the autopsy, it was determined he had died of a heart attack, and the fire was subsequent to his death.

== Acting roles ==
=== Starring in his own TV series ===
- Man Without a Gun (23 episodes, 1957–59) as Marshal Frank Tallman

=== Recurring role in a series ===
- Perry Mason as Sgt. Ben Landro

"The Case of the Difficult Detour" (1961)
"The Case of the Pathetic Patient" (1961)
"The Case of the Brazen Bequest" (1961)
"The Case of the Crippled Cougar" (1962)
"The Case of the Playboy Pugilist" (1962)
"The Case of the Fickle Filly" (1962)
"The Case of the Golden Venom" (1965) final appearance

also "The Case of the Slandered Submarine" (1960) as Barry Scott

- The Big Valley as Sheriff Fred Madden

"The Murdered Party" (1965)
"Earthquake!" (1965)
"My Son, My Son" (1965)
"The Odyssey of Jubal Tanner" (1965)
"The Young Marauders" (1965)
"Hazard" (1966)

=== Multiple appearances on a television series ===
- The Ford Television Theatre

"Crossed and Double Crossed" (1952) as Barfly
"Sudden Silence" (1956) The Deputy

- "The Cisco Kid

"Sky Sign" (1954) as Carver
"Marriage by Mail" (1954) as Professor
"Arroyo Millionaire's Castle" (1955) as Sheriff Tom Roscoe
"Cisco and the Tappers" (1955) as Bart Stevens

- Walt Disney's Wonderful World of Color

"Davy Crockett and the River Pirates" (1955) as Samuel Mason
"Davy Crockett's Keelboat Race" (1955) as Samuel Mason
Texas John Slaughter: "Ambush in Laredo" (1958)

- Cheyenne

"Star in the Dust" (1956) as Mike
"Johnny Bravo" (1956) as Ben Taggart
"Incident at Dawson Flats" (1961) as Sherriff Graves

- The Hardy Boys: The Mystery of the Applegate Treasure

"Never Say Die" (1956) as Policeman
"The Tower's Secret" (1956) as Policeman
"The Final Search" (1956) as Policeman

- The 20th Century Fox Hour

"Gun in His Hand" (1956) as Joe Kirby
"End of a Gun" (1957) as 1st Brother

- Gunsmoke

"No Handcuffs" (1956) as August Brake
"How to Die for Nothing" (1956) as Howard Bulow
"Born to Hang" (1957) as Robie
"Murder Warrant" (1959) as Jake Harbin
"Take Her, She's Cheap" (1964) as Loren Billings
"Death Train" (1967) as Jack Maple

- Broken Arrow

"Black Moment" (1957) as Halley
"Legacy of a Hero" (1957) as Connell

- Dick Powell's Zane Grey Theatre

"Time of Decision" (1957) as Bart Miller
"Man on the Run" (1957) as Pete Bostwick
"The Scar" (1961) as Foreman

- Trackdown

"The San Saba Incident" (1957) as Ike Collins
"Bad Judgment" (1959) as Rafe Borden

- The Life and Legend of Wyatt Earp

"The Vultures" (1957) as Sam Watts
"The Fanatic" (1960) as Odie Cairns

- Wanted: Dead or Alive

"The Bounty" (1958) as Clark Daimler
"Eight Cent Reward" (1958) as Harmon Stone
"Railroaded" (1959) as Ed Bruner
"The Healing Woman" (1959) as Tom Summers
"Most Beautiful Woman" (1960) as Frank

- Wagon Train

"The Jesse Cowan Story" (1957) as Bob Cowan
"The Clay Shelby Story" (1964) as Sgt. Bragan
"The Jarbo Pierce Story" (1965) as Grant

- The Rifleman

"The Sister" (1958) as Joshua Snipe
"Jealous Man" (1962) as Owens

- Maverick

"Day of Reckoning" (1958) as Red Scanlon
"Benefit of Doubt" (1961) as McGaven

- Bronco

"The Long Ride Back" (1958) as Jacob Stint
"Apache Treasure" (1960) as Hickins

- Sugarfoot

"Man Wanted" (1958) as Smiley
"Journey to Provision" (1960) as Sheriff Len Gogarty

- Bonanza

"Vendetta" (1959) as Carl Morgan
"Day of the Dragon" (1961) as Gordon
"The Miracle Maker" (1962) as Thorne
"Song in the Dark" (1963) as Deputy Sheriff Jeff Sykes
"Joe Cartwright, Detective" (1967) as Harry Perkins

- The Untouchables

"The Dutch Schultz Story" (1959) as Lulu Rosenkrantz
"Takeover" (1962) as Woody O'Mara

- Tales of Wells Fargo

"The Bounty Hunter" (1959) as Jeff Briscoe
"The Trading Post" (1960) as Robson

- Laramie

"Men of Defiance" (1960)
"Rimrock" (1961) as Rink Banners
"The Last Journey" (1961) as Damon Johntry
"War Hero" (1962) as Obie Loomis

- Stagecoach West

"By the Deep Six" (1960) as Martin
"The Remounts" (1961) as Griz
"The Marker" (1961) as Mingo

- Kraft Suspense Theatre

"In Darkness, Waiting: Part 1 and Part 2" (1965) as Victor Prelling

- The Fugitive

"Smoke Screen" (1963) as Ranger Ritter
"Moon Child" (1965) as George Mangus
"Conspiracy of Silence" (1965) as Murchison

- The Virginian

"Duel at Shiloh" (1963) as Deputy Bender
"Another's Footsteps" (1964) as Garrett
"Show Me a Hero" (1965) as Bert Devlin

- Daniel Boone

"The King's Shilling" (1967) as Andrew Hubbard
"Flag of Truce" (1968) as General Grosscup

- Mission: Impossible

"The Frame" (1967) as Al Souchek
"The Seal" (1967) as William Conway
"Two Thousand" (1972) as Marshall

- Ironside

"Girl in the Night" (1967) as Mike Hennessey
"The Machismo Bag" (1969) as Lieutenant Rambau

- The Guns of Will Sonnett

"A Town in Terror: Pt 1 & Pt 2" (1969) as Ben Adams

- Mannix

"You Can Get Killed Out There" (1968) as Al
"War of Nerves" (1970) as Hijacker

=== Single episode television appearances ===
- Biff Baker, U.S.A. – "Crash Landing" (1952) as Soldier
- Family Theatre – "A Star Shall Rise" (1952) as Scribe
- Gruen Guild Theater – "Girl from Kansas" (1952) as Boxcar Johnson
- I Led Three Lives – "The Spy" (1953) as Comrade Straight
- The Adventures of Kit Carson – Badman's Escape" (1953)
- Hopalong Cassidy – "Arizona Troubleshooters" (1953) as George Byers
- Rocky Jones, Space Ranger – "Beyond the Curtain of Space" (1954) as Ophician Soldier
- Waterfront – "Captain for a Day" (1955) as Darby
- Crusader – "The Farm" (1956) as Heinrich
- The Man Behind the Badge – "The Case of the Unwelcome Stranger" (1955) as Lloyd
- Treasury Men in Action – "The Case of the Ready Guns" (1955) as Ben Adams
- Big Town – "Shield of a Killer" (1955)
- The Lone Ranger – "Six-Gun Artist" (1955) as Lafe, Second Thug
- Cavalcade of America – "The Doll Who Found a Mother" (1956)
- You Are There – "Decatur's Raid at Tripoli (February 16, 1804)" (1956)
- The Sheriff of Cochise – "Fire on Chiricahua Mountains" (1956) as Barlett
- Crossroads – "Boom Town Padre" (1957) as Luke Cassidy
- Panic! – "The Subway" (1957) as Detective
- Casey Jones – "Night Mail" (1957) as Mike Nelson
- Broken Arrow – "Black Moment" (1957) as Halley
- Zorro – "Garcia Stands Accused" (1958) as Lancer
- Have Gun – Will Travel – "The Man Who Lost" (1959) as Ben Coey
- The Alaskans – "Million Dollar Kid" (1960) as Wilkes
- Law of the Plainsman – "The Gibbet" (1959) as Zeb Derkson
- The Man from Blackhawk – "Station Six" (1959)
- Bat Masterson – "Who'll Bury My Violence?" (1959) as Barney Kaster
- Wichita Town – "Man on the Hill" (1959) as Pete Bennett
- The David Niven Show– "Sticks and Stones" (1959) as Police Lieutenant O'Brien
- The Detectives Starring Robert Taylor – "The Scalpel" (1960) as Dr. Bruce
- The Aquanauts – "Deep Escape" (1960)
- Dante – "Opening Night" (1960) as Lt. Robert Malone
- Markham – "13 Avenida Muerte" (1960) as Cal
- Tate – "The Mary Hardin Story" (1960) as Tetlow
- The Texan – "Thirty Hours to Kill" (1960) as Ben Dawson/Blackie Dawson
- Shotgun Slade – "The Deadly Key" (1960) as Ben Wesley
- Men into Space – "Shadows on the Moon" (1960) as Dr. George Coldwell
- Pony Express – "Special Delivery" (1960) as Strobridge
- Johnny Ringo – "Killer, Choose a Card" (1960) as Jed Matthews
- Lawman – "Owny O'Reilly, Esq." (1961) as Jack Saunders
- GE True – "The Black-Robed Ghost" (1963) as Det. John Duncan
- The Wild Wild West – "The Night of the Casual Killer" (1965) as Chuck Harper
- My Favorite Martian – "The Time Machine Is Waking Up That Old Gang of Mine" (1965) as Jesse James
- A Man Called Shenandoah – "The Locket" (1965) as Sheriff
- Bewitched – "Speak the Truth" (1965) as Traffic Policeman
- Death Valley Days – "No Gun Behind His Badge" (1965) Whalen (with Ronald Reagan as Thomas J. Smith)
- The Green Hornet – "Give 'Em Enough Rope" (1966) as Alex Colony
- Laredo – "Finnegan" (1966) as Muldoon
- Iron Horse – "Explosion at Waycrossing" (1966) as Sheriff Harkness
- The Invaders – "Condition: Red" (1967) as Mr. Arius
- The Felony Squad – "The Death Bag" (1967) as Louie Antonides
- Maya – "The Legend of Whitney Markham" (1968) as Frank Sanders
- The Outcasts – "They Shall Rise Up" (1969) as Tauber
- The Name of the Game – "A Wrath of Angels" (1969) as Berg Jannsen
- Land of the Giants – "Home Sweet Home" (1969) as Constable
- Lancer – "The Rivals" (1970) as Kling
- Adam-12 (1971) as Luke Nathan
- Alias Smith and Jones – "McGuffin" (1972) as First Man
- The Mod Squad – "Kill Gently, Sweet Jessie" (1972)
- The Streets of San Francisco – "Deathwatch" (1973) as Victor W. Snyder (final appearance)

=== Theatrical films ===
- Affair in Trinidad (1952) as Martin, Wittol's Henchman
- No Holds Barred (1952) as Second Mug (uncredited)
- The Juggler (1953) as Policeman (uncredited)
- The Farmer Takes a Wife (1953) as Floyd (uncredited)
- Hannah Lee: An American Primitive (1953) as Doctor (uncredited)
- Texas Bad Man (1953) as Bartender
- The Wild One (1953) as Deputy (uncredited)
- It Should Happen to You (1954) as Photographer (uncredited)
- Drive a Crooked Road (1954) as Garage Foreman (uncredited)
- Pushover (film) (1954) as Second Bartender (uncredited)
- A Star Is Born (1954) as Makeup Man (uncredited)
- Cry Vengeance (1954) as Johnny Blue-Eyes
- Jupiter's Darling (1955) as Hannibal's Guard (uncredited)
- Dial Red O (1955) as Newspaper Photographer (uncredited)
- The Naked Street (1955) as Finney (uncredited)
- To Hell and Back (1955) as Soldier in Bunk (uncredited)
- The Marauders (1955) as Carmack
- Trial (1955) as Reporter (uncredited)
- Desert Sands (1955) as Woloack, Radio Man
- Ransom! (1956) as Service Man (uncredited)
- The Harder They Fall (1956) as Reporter in Hospital (uncredited)
- Crashing Las Vegas (1956) as Oggy
- Tension at Table Rock (1956) as Deputy Sheriff (uncredited)
- The Shadow on the Window (1957) as Myra's Husband (uncredited)
- The Iron Sheriff (1957) as Range Detective Sutherland
- Man in the Shadow (1957) as Empire Ranch Gateman Bill Edmunds
- Bombers B-52 (1957) as Sergeant addressing Flyers (uncredited)
- Touch of Evil (1958) as Al Schwartz, District Attorney's Assistant
- Ride a Crooked Trail (1958) as Pecos
- Psycho (1960) as Highway Patrol Officer
- Twenty Plus Two (1961) as Harbin (uncredited)
- Gunfight at Comanche Creek (1963) as Ben Bady
- The Quick Gun (1964) as Cagle
- Bullet for a Badman (1964) as Ira Snow
- Where Love Has Gone (1964) as Petey Peterson (uncredited)
- The Outlaws Is Coming (1965) as Trigger Mortis
- Blindfold (1966) as Homburg
- Torn Curtain (1966) as Farmer
- Return of the Gunfighter (1967) as Will Parker
- The Name of the Game Is Kill! (1968) as Sheriff Fred Kendall
- Strategy of Terror (1969) as Victor Pelling
- Breakout (1970) (TV) as Middleton
- Soldier Blue (1970) as Sgt. O'Hearn
