= Double Crossbones =

1951 film by Charles Barton

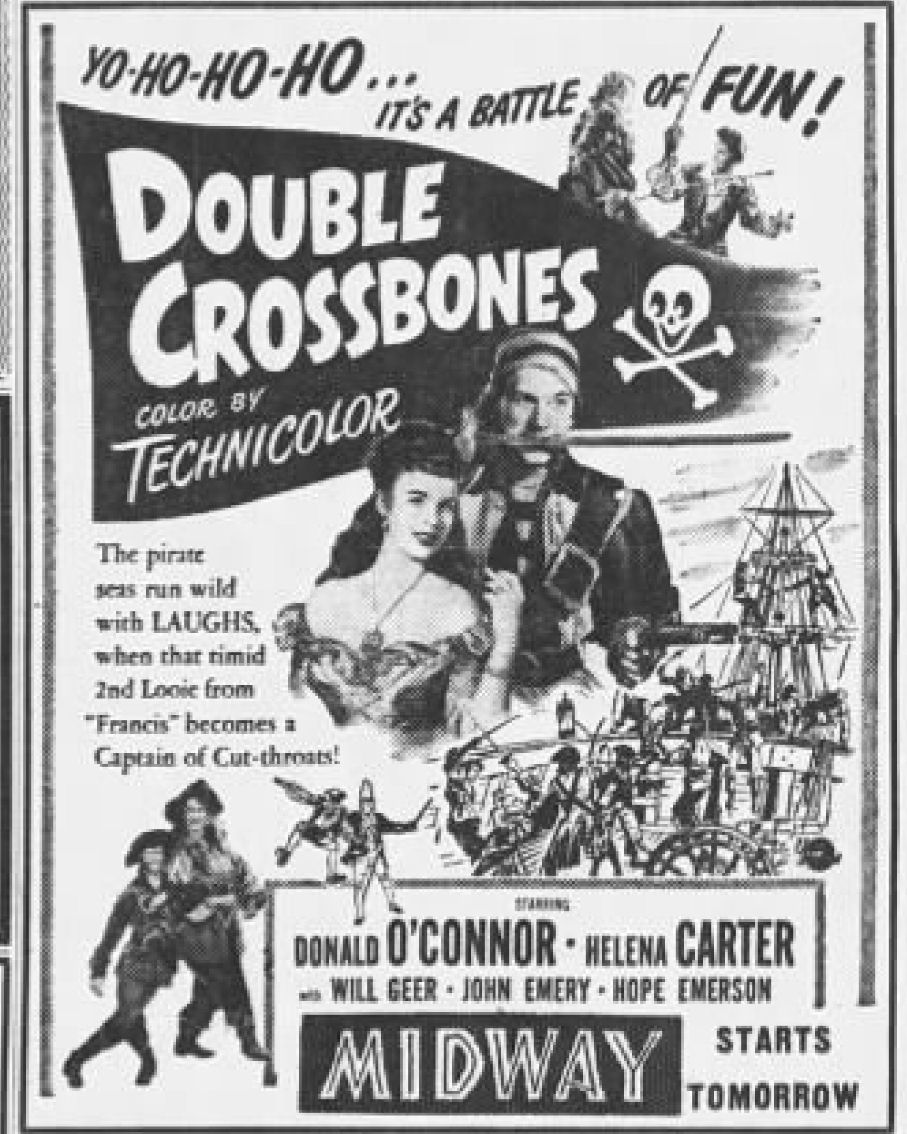
- Newspaper advertisement
- Directed by: Charles Barton
- Screenplay by: Oscar Brodney; John Grant
- Story by: Oscar Brodney
- Produced by: Leonard Goldstein
- Starring: Donald O'Connor; Helena Carter
- Narrated by: Jeff Chandler
- Cinematography: Maury Gertsman
- Edited by: Russell F. Schoengarth
- Music by: Frank Skinner
- Production company: Universal Pictures
- Distributed by: Universal-International
- Release date: April 26, 1951 (New York City)
- Running time: 76 minutes
- Country: United States
- Language: English

Double Crossbones is a 1951 American Technicolor comedy adventure film distributed by Universal International, produced by Leonard Goldstein, directed by Charles Barton and starring Donald O'Connor and Helena Carter. The plot involves a shopkeeper's apprentice who becomes a pirate after being falsely accused of selling stolen goods.

== Plot ==
In the late 1700s, Charleston, South Carolina is a haven for pirates who sell their plunder there. Davey Crandall and his friend and coworker Tom Botts watch the ship Liverpool Queen enter the harbor. As soon as the cargo is unloaded and transferred to the shelves of Davey's employer, cranky shopkeeper Caleb Nicholas, Charleston territorial governor Gerald Elden brings his ward Lady Sylvia Copeland and British aristocrats Lord and Lady Montrose to view the new wares.

While Sylvia and Davey flirt innocently, Lord Montrose recognizes a pin stolen from an English friend amid the booty. Although the governor is secretly in partnership with Caleb to fence pirate plunder, he feigns shock and orders Caleb, Davey and Tom to be arrested. Davey and Tom escape, but Caleb is brought before Elden, who shoots him to prevent him from talking. He then surprises Sylvia by proposing marriage to her. When she spurns him, he orders her to accompany him to Virginia and, realizing that she loves Davey, vows to kill him.

Davey and Tom buy passage from Captain "Bloodthirsty" Ben Wickett on his ship, the Defiance. Wickett takes their money but plans to throw them overboard.

At sea the next morning, Wickett attempts to inebriate Davey and Tom, but Davey, who is allergic to alcohol, refuses. When they are shown the plank that they are to walk, Davey grabs a bottle and drinks, causing hives to erupt on his face. He convinces the pirates that he has the dreaded pox, and they abandon the ship in a panic. Davey and Tom sail alone until they spot another ship, the Southern Gypsy. Not realizing that the Defiance sports a pirate flag, they are puzzled when the Southern Gypsy flees. They fire a cannon as a signal for help, only to dismast the other ship. Through a spyglass, Davey sees Elden on the deck, so Tom suggests that he disguise himself as a pirate named Bloodthirsty Dave.

After he and Tom board the Southern Gypsy, Elden recognizes Davey, but Tom insists that being a shopkeeper's apprentice was merely a ruse and that Davey is actually a pirate captain. Sylvia appears and hears Davey's threats, and she denounces him and informs Elden that she will marry him. There is no cargo aboard, only prisoners bound for a debtors' prison, so Dave takes them and frees the Southern Gypsy. Tom says that there is only one safe place for them, the pirate stronghold of Tortuga. The freed prisoners agree, so Davey has no choice but to lead them there.

On Tortuga, Davey is brought before a pirate tribunal that includes Henry Morgan, Captain Kidd, Mistress Ann Bonney, Captain Long Ben Avery and Blackbeard. They test Davey's alleged killer instinct by pitting him against Blackbeard. Davey wins the fight and is accepted into the Pirate Brotherhood. He learns that they are funded by a mysterious American, whose messenger Davey quickly recognizes as Elden's valet. He begs the pirates to help him attack Elden in Charleston, but they refuse and he is forced to proceed alone.

Back in Charleston, Davey disguises himself as a British aristocrat in order to infiltrate a costume ball that Elden is holding for Sylvia. He spirits Sylvia away and, by describing the wedding gown that Elden bought from a pirate, convinces her that her fiancé is corrupt. However, Elden recognizes Davey and jails him. That night, Sylvia secretly boards the Defiance and plans with Tom to paint a miniature armada on the lens of a telescope, which will trick Elden into thinking that he is being attacked by pirates. The trick works, and Elden signs a confession. Davey races to Lord Montrose's ship, but Elden arrives there first and shoots him. Tom and Davey's crew arrive and a sword fight ensues. Just as Davey chases Elden up a sail, the Pirate Brotherhood arrives to help. Panicking, Elden falls into the ocean.

In Tortuga months later, Davey is married to Sylvia and is revered as a powerful pirate. He arranges for a pardon for his fellow pirates, but news of a nearby ship loaded with gold quickly ends their reformation.

== Cast ==
- Donald O'Connor as Davey Crandall
- Helena Carter as Lady Sylvia Copeland
- Will Geer as Tom Botts
- John Emery as Governor Gerald Elden
- Stanley Logan as Lord Montrose
- Kathryn Givney as Lady Montrose
- Hayden Rorke as Malcolm Giles
- Morgan Farley as Caleb Nicholas
- Robert Barrat as Henry Morgan
- Alan Napier as Captain Kidd
- Glenn Strange as Captain Ben Avery
- Louis Bacigalupi as Blackbeard
- Hope Emerson as Mistress Ann Bonney
- Charles McGraw as Captain "Bloodthirsty" Ben Wickett

== Production ==
The film was originally known as Half a Buccaneer and was announced in April 1949 with Donald O'Connor attached as its star. Oscar Brodney wrote the script. In August, the title was changed and filming began.

Some of the shots involving the ships at sea were taken from the Universal International 1950 film Buccaneer's Girl.

Actor Jeff Chandler narrates the opening of the film, talking about the history of the world's most vicious pirates and introducing viewers to O'Connor's character.

== Reception ==
In a contemporary review for The New York Times, critic A. H. Weiler wrote: "Far be it from this viewer to dispute matters of piracy with Universal-International, but 'Double Crossbones' ... has practically all the noted. buccaneers in history assembled at the same table in happy conclave. Historical accuracy aside, however, this travesty ... has the grace not to take itself seriously even though it is all dressed up in bright Technicolor. ... 'Double Crossbones' is a limp lampoon. Piracy must have been more fun and Universal's synthetic buccaneers seem to have missed the boat this time."

== Home video ==
Universal released the film on DVD on May 8, 2007 as part of the Pirates of the Golden Age Movie Collection, a two-disc set featuring three other films (Against All Flags, Buccaneer's Girl and Yankee Buccaneer). This film was rereleased on August 28, 2014 as a standalone DVD as part of the Universal Vault Series.
