= Michael Meshekoff =

American television producer

- Born: October 10, 1911; New York, U.S.
- Died: June 8, 1997 (aged 85); Los Angeles, California, U.S.
- Occupation: Television producer
- Spouse: Helena Carter (m. 1953)

Michael Meshekoff (October 10, 1911 – June 8, 1997) was an American television producer. He produced for television programs including Dragnet, Temple Houston, Steve Canyon, GE True and Dante.

Meshekoff died in Los Angeles, California on June 8, 1997, at the age of 85.
