= The Man from Blackhawk =

American Western TV series (1959–1960)

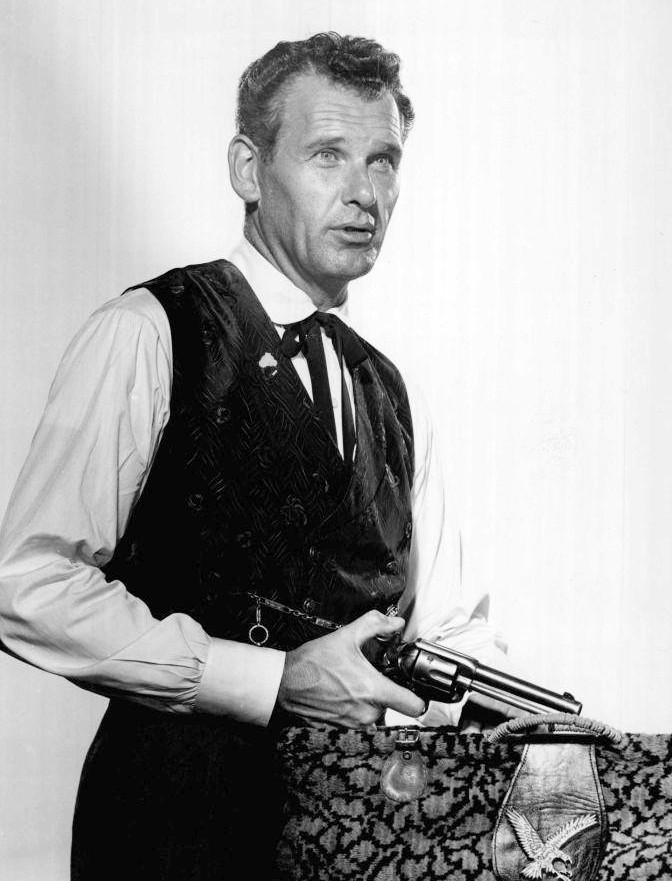
- Robert Rockwell as Sam Logan
- Genre: Western
- Created by: Frank Barron
- Starring: Robert Rockwell
- Country of origin: United States
- Original language: English
- No. of seasons: 1
- No. of episodes: 37

Production
- Camera setup: Single-camera
- Running time: 30 minutes
- Production companies: Stuart-Oliver Productions; Screen Gems

Original release
- Network: ABC
- Release: October 9, 1959 – September 23, 1960

The Man from Blackhawk is a Western television series about an insurance investigator starring Robert Rockwell that aired on ABC from October 9, 1959, until September 23, 1960. It was also shown in Canada on CBC Television.

== Premise ==
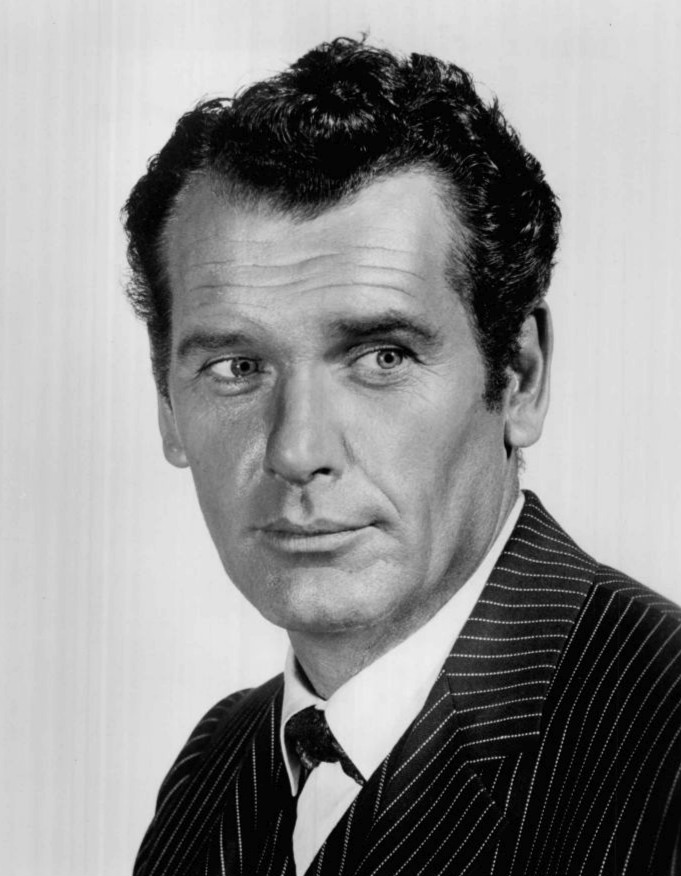
Robert Rockwell ca. 1959

In The Man from Blackhawk, (set in the 1870s), Rockwell plays Sam Logan, an insurance investigator from the Blackhawk Insurance Company, which has headquarters in Chicago. Logan scours the West investigating claims, verifying their accuracy, and seeking to root out fraud and dishonesty. He is also more inclined to use his fists than a gun.

Much of Logan's work is done in disguise, and he has outfits for 34 professions, including cotton speculator, cowhand, gentleman of leisure, professional gambler, and stage driver.

Rockwell, who won the Logan role over 135 competing actors, said of his character: "He has strong principles, amazing integrity and is completely self sufficient. He's not particularly pleasant but he's always needling, always digging for evil."

== Characters and actors ==
Beverly Garland is cast as Sarah Marshall, with Richard Rust as George Blackburn, in "Logan's Policy", the series premiere (October 9, 1959). Ruta Lee portrays Ginnie Thompson, a young woman due to collect her murdered father's life insurance policy, in "The Legacy" (December 25, 1959). Chubby Johnson portrayed Jessie Turnbull in the episode titled "The Last Days of Jessie Turnbull." Not all episodes are set in the American West. Tommy Rettig and Amanda Randolph, for instance, are cast as Pierre and Auntie Cotton, respectively, in "The Ghost of Lafitte" (1960), set in New Orleans, Louisiana, with Robert Foulk as Hoag Lafitte. Gregg Palmer and Walter Burke are cast as Gil Harrison and Tom Abbott, respectively, in "The Harpoon Story" (1960), set in coastal New England. Nita Talbot appears in the episode "In His Steps" (1960), set in the Bowery district of New York City. Child actor Robert Eyer portrays Davey in "The Montreal Story" (1960).

Other guest stars include:

- John Anderson
- Joanna Barnes
- Robert Bray
- Virginia Christine
- Andy Clyde
- Walter Coy
- Brad Dexter
- Virginia Gregg
- Alan Hale, Jr.
- Chubby Johnson
- Bethel Leslie
- Mort Mills
- Denver Pyle
- Harry Dean Stanton
- Robert J. Stevenson
- Karl Swenson
- Jean Willes

== Production ==
The Man from Blackhawk was a Screen Gems production. The series was created by Frank Barron and produced by Herb Meadow. Meadow left after 13 weeks to return to writing. Although he had been under contract for 26 episodes, he cited the demands of 18-hour work days that exhausted him mentally and left no time for his family or other activities.

The show was broadcast from 8:30 to 9 p.m. Eastern Time on Fridays. Competition in its time slot included Hotel de Paree on CBS and Wichita Town on NBC.

Producers spent more than two years looking through insurance company records, old newspapers, and other documents to find material about 1870s-era insurance business operations and how swindles and frauds were committed.

== Episodes ==
No. in season	Title	Directed by	Written by	Original release date
1	"Logan's Policy"	John Peyser	Herb Meadow & Al C. Ward	October 9, 1959
2	"The Trouble with Tolliver"	Walter Grauman	Stirling Silliphant	October 16, 1959
3	"The New Semaria Story"	Lamont Johnson	Herb Meadow	October 23, 1959
4	"The Man Who Stole Happiness"	John Peyser	Herb Meadow	October 30, 1959
5	"The Gypsy Story"	David Lowell Rich	Paul Savage	November 6, 1959
6	"Station Six"	John Brahm	Calvin Clements	November 13, 1959
7	"Vendetta for the Lovelorn"	Richard Whorf	Tom Gries	November 20, 1959
8	"The Winthrop Woman"	David Lowell Rich	Michael Morris	November 27, 1959
9	"Contraband Cargo"	John Peyser	Arthur Dales and Herb Meadow	December 4, 1959
10	"A Matter of Conscience"	John Brahm	Lee Berg	December 11, 1959
11	"Death is the Best Policy"	Walter Grauman	Bernie Giler	December 18, 1959
12	"The Legacy"	Unknown	Unknown	December 25, 1959
13	"The Biggest Legend"	Walter Grauman	Stirling Silliphant	January 1, 1960
14	"Death at Noon"	Harmon Jones	Al C. Ward	January 8, 1960
15	"The Savage"	Bernard L. Kowalski	Raphael Hayes	January 15, 1960
16	"The Hundred Thousand Dollar Policy"	Robert Altman	Paul & Margaret Schneider	January 22, 1960
17	"Portrait of Cynthia"	Unknown	Unknown	January 29, 1960
18	"El Patron"	Anton Leader	Al C. Ward	February 5, 1960
19	"Drawing Account"	Unknown	Unknown	February 12, 1960
20	"The Ghost of Lafitte"	Harmon Jones	Al C. Ward	February 26, 1960
21	"Execution Day"	Harmon Jones	Bob & Wanda Duncan	March 4, 1960
22	"Destination Death"	Harmon Jones	Jack Laird	March 11, 1960
23	"Diamond Cut Diamond"	John Peyser	Arthur E. Orloff	March 18, 1960
24	"Death by Northwest"	Harmon Jones	Bill S. Ballinger	March 25, 1960
25	"The Last Days of Jessie Turnbull"	Unknown	Unknown	April 1, 1960
26	"The Search for Cape Borden"	Harmon Jones	E. Jack Neuman	April 15, 1960
27	"The Sons of Don Antonio"	Harmon Jones	Bob and Wanda Duncan, Raphael Hayes	April 22, 1960
28	"Incident at Tupelo"	Unknown	Unknown	April 29, 1960
29	"The Harpoon Story"	Unknown	Unknown	May 6, 1960
30	"The Montreal Story"	Unknown	Unknown	May 13, 1960
31	"In His Steps"	Unknown	Unknown	May 20, 1960
32	"Trial by Combat"	Unknown	Unknown	May 27, 1960
33	"The Man Who Wanted Everything"	Unknown	Unknown	June 3, 1960
34	"The Money Machine"	John Peyser	Donn Mullally	June 10, 1960
35	"The Lady in Yellow"	Unknown	Unknown	June 17, 1960
36	"Gold is Where You Find It"	Unknown	Unknown	June 24, 1960
37	"Remember Me Not"	Unknown	Unknown	September 9, 1960
