= Dante (TV series) =

American TV adventure/drama television series (1960–1961)

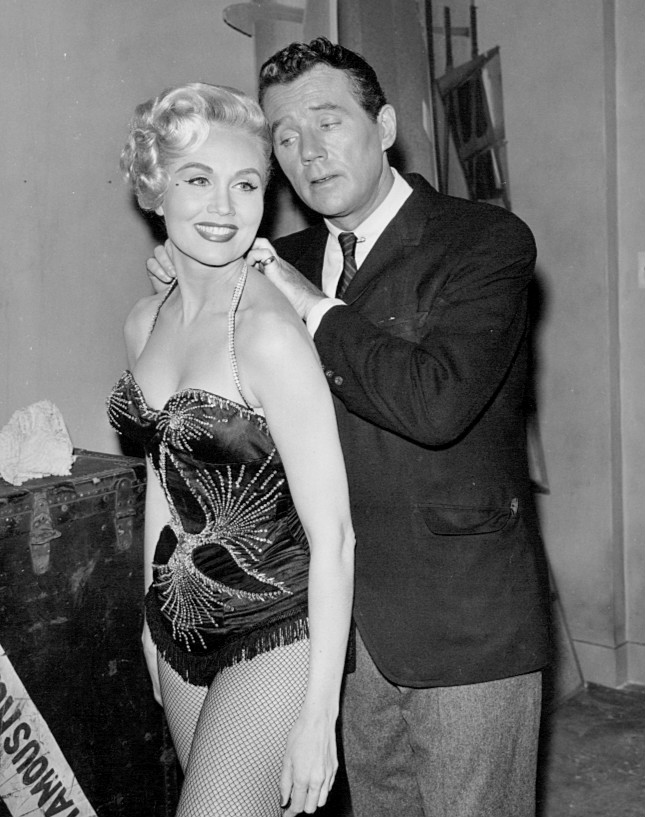
- Howard Duff and Barbara English in The Devil to Pay, 1961
- Created by: Blake Edwards
- Starring: Howard Duff; Alan Mowbray; Tom D'Andrea; Mort Mills
- Composer: Leith Stevens
- Country of origin: United States
- No. of seasons: 1
- No. of episodes: 26

Production
- Running time: 25 minutes

Original release
- Network: NBC
- Release: October 3, 1960 – April 10, 1961

Dante is an American adventure/drama television series. It starred Howard Duff, and was broadcast on Monday nights at 9:30 p.m. on NBC from October 3, 1960, through April 10, 1961.

== Earlier version of Dante ==
Actor Dick Powell had previously played Dante in episodes of Four Star Playhouse, initially written by Blake Edwards, who had previously created the radio drama Richard Diamond, Private Detective for Powell. There, Willie operates an illegal gambling operation in the back room of the "Inferno", which police soon shut down. The only regular from the Four Star Playhouse version to be cast in the series as well was Mowbray, who had first played a millionaire named Jackson who had gambled away his fortune and then worked as one of Dante's waiters. The Four Star Playhouse episodes featuring Dante were subsequently rebroadcast as a group under the collective title The Best in Mystery during that show's 1956 summer run.

== Series synopsis ==
Willie Dante, a suave ladies' man, had previously run gambling establishments in different parts of the country, and when he opened a San Francisco nightclub called Dante's Inferno both the police and the criminal establishment believed that he was still breaking the law. Two of Dante's long-time sidekicks worked with him at the nightclub. Biff, the bartender, and Stewart, the British maitre d', continued to have an interest in criminal activities, and their interactions with Dante provided much of the show's humor.

In a 1960 interview about the series co-star Alan Mowbray stated: "Our gimmick? Charming dishonesty."

== Cast ==
- Howard Duff as Willie Dante
- Alan Mowbray as Stewart Styles
- Tom D'Andrea as Biff
- James Nolan as Inspector Loper
- Mort Mills as Police Lt. Bob Malone

== Episode list ==
No.	Title	Directed by	Written by	Original release date
1	"One For The Birds"	Richard Kinon	Harold Jack Bloom	October 3, 1960
Stewart Stiles is being blackmailed by someone using a homing pigeon to receive the money. If Stewart's past is revealed it may jeopardize the opening of the Inferno.
2	"Opening Night"	Ida Lupino	Aaron Spelling	October 10, 1960
Former gambler Willie Dante opens a San Francisco nightclub, but neither the police nor the criminals believe he's gone legit.
3	"The Feline Traveler"	Richard Kinon	Harold Jack Bloom	October 17, 1960
A blackmailer dies inside the Inferno, and the murderer thinks the man revealed information to Dante.
4	"Dante's Dilemma"	Richard Kinon	Story by : E. Jack Neuman; Teleplay by : Harold Jack Bloom	October 31, 1960
A swindler's nephew has evidence for the district attorney, but leaves the papers at the Inferno. Dante's life is in danger until he can hand the evidence over to the authorities.
5	"The Misfortune Cookie"	Richard Kinon	Harold Jack Bloom	November 7, 1960
Dante's Chinese kitchen helper entered the U.S. illegally and must pay most of his wages to a smuggler.
6	"San Quentin Quill"	Alan Crosland Jr.	Harold Jack Bloom	November 14, 1960
An author writes a bestselling novel allegedly based on Dante's life. Two crooks read a book review and believe Dante is a fence for stolen goods.
7	"The Unclean Green"	Richard Kinon	Palmer Thompson	November 21, 1960
Thieves replace Dante's money with stolen bills, and the police think Dante is responsible for a holdup that resulted in a man being murdered.
8	"The Bavarian Barbarians"	Richard Kinon	A. Sanford Wolf and Irwin Winehouse	November 28, 1960
Ruthless Europeans offer Dante $5,000 for a $200 copy of a famous painting. A chemical formula is hidden behind the reproduction.
9	"My Pal, The Bullseye"	Richard Kinon	Jack Laird	December 5, 1960
A killer (John Anderson) is hired to do away with Biff, and make his death look like an accident.
10	"The Jolly Roger Cocktail"	Harry Harris Jr.	Harold Jack Bloom	December 19, 1960
A bookkeeper (William Schallert) witnesses a Chicago murder, and is told he'll receive hush money at the Inferno. The murdered man's brother (Edward Platt) shows up at the nightclub looking for revenge.
11	"A Punch From Judy"	Richard Kinon	Arthur Dales	December 26, 1960
Dante hires a beautiful singer who's been beaten, but is he being set up by the woman?
12	"Don't Come On'a My House"	Richard Kinon	Harold Jack Bloom	January 2, 1961
Dante inherits a mansion for repayment of an old $5,500 gambling debt. The deceased man's cousin will go to great lengths to obtain possession of the house.
13	"Wine, Women, and Willie"	Richard Kinon	Harold Jack Bloom	January 9, 1961
When the government wants Dante to testify against a racketeer the nightclub owner is tricked aboard an airplane headed to South America.
14	"Dial D For Dante"	Alan Crosland Jr.	Joel M. Rapp and Charles R. Marion	January 16, 1961
Dante receives a $50,000 trust fund set up by an enemy. If Dante dies before the end of the week a killer will get the money.
15	"The Devil To Pay"	Alan Crosland Jr.	Joseph Calvelli	January 23, 1961
Roy Larkin, a has-been boxer, obtains a vicious promoter and returns to the ring. Dante knows Larkin, and believes he's being forced to fight.
16	"Dante Rides Again"	Alan Crosland Jr.	Harold Jack Bloom	January 30, 1961
A bank robber / cop killer sends his girlfriend (Nita Talbot) to ask Dante to help him. When Dante refuses he is framed as an accessory to the crimes.
17	"Dante's Fickle Fate"	Christian Nyby	Jack Laird	February 6, 1961
A clairvoyant predicts Dante will murder a former girlfriend's husband. The husband's car brakes are tampered with, and Dante is shot at. Who will profit if the men die?
18	"Aces And Eights"	Alan Crosland Jr.	Story by : William Spier; Teleplay by : Harold Jack Bloom	February 13, 1961
One of Dante's former girlfriends is taking wealthy men to crooked card games allegedly run by Dante. The nightclub owner locates where the card games are taking place, and deals himself in on the next game.
19	"Light Lady, Dark Room"	Richard Kinon	Fred Freiberger and Harold Jack Bloom	February 20, 1961
Dante investigates a blackmail ring connected to the Inferno. Are nightclub employees involved in the operation?
20	"Not As A Canary"	Alan Crosland Jr.	Harold Jack Bloom	February 27, 1961
A gambling syndicate is hunting for the husband of one of Dante's former girlfriends. Dante agrees to help the husband, but finds himself in grave danger.
21	"Pick A Peck Of Diamonds"	Richard Kinon	Story by : Bernie Giler; Teleplay by : Bernie Giler and Harold Jack Bloom	March 6, 1961
Dante is accused of stealing a diamond bracelet he was delivering for a friend. The insurance investigator believes the friend may be involved in the thief.
22	"Dante In The Dark"	Richard Kinon	Tom Gries and Harold Jack Bloom	March 13, 1961
A friend of Dante is killed near the Inferno, and the dead man's fiancé isn't permitted to see the man's body. Dante suspects a coverup.
23	"Hunter With a Badge"	Alan Crosland Jr.	Harold Jack Bloom	March 20, 1961
A police detective (Charles McGraw) with a grudge hates that his attorney brother is working for Dante regarding a scandal magazine spreading lies. The brother is killed – after telling Dante to meet him at his office late at night.
24	"Friendly Assassin"	Alan Crosland Jr.	Harold Jack Bloom	March 27, 1961
Dante witnesses a murder as he is leaving a building. The next morning a garageman is blown up while trying to move Dante's car. A woman claims she'll name the killer in exchange for a $10,000 reward.
25	"Sesame Key"	David Orrick McDearmon	Palmer Thompson	April 3, 1961
The police blame Dante for a string of burglaries that took place while the victims were at the Inferno. Is an employee involved with the crimes?
26	"Around a Dark Corner"	Alan Crosland Jr.	Harold Jack Bloom	April 10, 1961
Dante's old friend (Paul Fix) asks for help in finding a runaway stepdaughter. The search leads to murder.

== Production ==
The producer was Michael Meshekoff, the director was Richard Kinon, and the writer was Harold Jack Bloom. The show's competition included Adventures in Paradise on ABC and The Andy Griffith Show on CBS. Dante was co-sponsored by the Alberto-Culver Company and the Singer Sewing Machine Company.

== Critical response ==
A review of the premiere episode in the trade publication Variety complimented Duff's and Mowbray's facility with delivering fast lines but found the script flawed, saying that the show needed "some decent writing support for the competent stars". It added all of the sets looked "either phony or cheap" and needed to be improved.
