= GE True =

American anthology TV series

- A screenshot from the opening sequence
- Also known as: General Electric True
- Genre: Anthology
- Written by: Harold Jack Bloom; Otis Carney; John Kneubuhl; Lou Morheim; Dean Riesner; Michael Zagor
- Directed by: William Conrad; Robert M. Leeds; Jack Webb
- Presented by: Jack Webb
- Narrated by: Jack Webb
- Country of origin: United States
- Original language: English
- No. of seasons: 1
- No. of episodes: 33

Production
- Executive producer: Jack Webb
- Producer: Michael Meshekoff
- Cinematography: Daniel L. Fapp; Bert Glennon; Carl E. Guthrie; Harold E. Stine
- Camera setup: Single-camera
- Running time: 25 minutes
- Production companies: Warner Bros. Television; CBS Television Network

Original release
- Network: CBS
- Release: September 30, 1962 – May 26, 1963

GE True (also known as General Electric True) is a 33-episode, American anthology series sponsored by General Electric that aired from September 30, 1962, until May 26, 1963, with repeats through September 1963. Telecast on CBS, the series presented stories, both published and unpublished, from the files of True magazine. The series' executive producer was Jack Webb through his Mark VII Limited company; he also acted as host-narrator, directed several episodes, and acted in several episodes.

== Program overview ==
A representative of the publisher of True magazine met Jack Webb at a party in New York and suggested the magazine as a source of material. Webb and others then researched the magazine's files for story ideas. Stories were adapted for television primarily by head writer Harold Jack Bloom. More than half of the episodes were directed by William Conrad, who portrayed Matt Dillon on radio's Gunsmoke and was later the star of the CBS crime drama Cannon.

In an overview of the 1962 television season, Time noted:

Jack ("dum-de-dum-dum") Webb is back. This time he is retelling stories from the files of True magazine. The first one was set on a hospital ship off Okinawa, where a doctor (played by William Conrad) operated on a marine who had a live and sensitive shell in his body capable of blowing a six-foot hole in a steel deck. It was a hell of a moment, but Webb sank it. "At 1830 hours exactly," he intoned, "the operation began on a human bomb dead center in the circle of death." He hosts the program in an echo-chambered voice, while he stands beside the word TRUE, spelled out in block letters 22 feet high, or roughly 10 times as tall as Jack Webb. (Note: The final clause in the Time quote is unclear, as it suggests Webb's height was 2.2 feet (0.67 m)—Webb was 5 feet 10 inches (1.78 m) tall.)

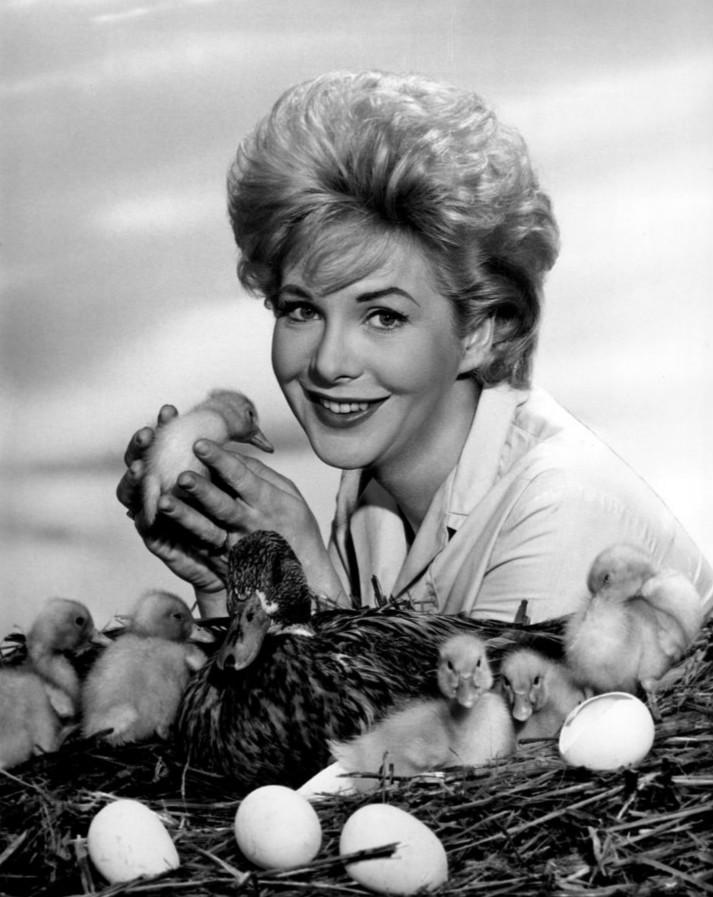
Jan Shepard in episode "Gertie the Great"

GE True aired at 9:30 p.m. Sundays, following The McCoys, a sitcom that had moved to CBS from ABC. GE True aired a half-hour later than a predecessor series, General Electric Theater, hosted by Ronald Reagan, which had aired at 9 p.m. from 1953 to 1962. Both The McCoys and GE True faced opposition from the highly rated Western series Bonanza on NBC.

The show had a unique opening, of which there were at least two variants. Each opening featured a large "TRUE" sign, apparently several stories tall and shown at an oblique angle, initially in deep shadow. One variant began with Webb voicing "Good evening. Your host, General Electric." with a large GE logo displayed next to the TRUE sign. Another variant lacked the GE logo, but included a superimposed quotation from Daniel Webster: "There is nothing so powerful as truth, and often nothing so strange." Strong symphonic music was featured as part of a majestic opening theme. Webb walked alongside the TRUE sign and stated either "And this, is true" (GE logo variant) or simply "This is true". The sign became brightly lit and the camera changed to a direct view of Webb, who then introduced the episode.

The Webb-hosted short film Red Nightmare (1962) had similarities to the GE True episode "The Last Day", although the former was presented as fantasy via a dream sequence.

In February 1963, Webb succeeded William T. Orr as executive in charge of Warner Bros. Television, with Orr moving to the motion picture part of Warner Bros. At the beginning of June 1963, it was reported that GE True would not continue. Webb's role with Warner ended in December 1963.

Reruns of GE True were later syndicated under the title True.

== Episodes ==
No.	Title	Directed by	Written by	Original release date
1	"Circle of Death"	Jack Webb	Dale Wasserman	September 30, 1962
During the Battle of Okinawa, a doctor (William Conrad) operates on a marine with a live projectile shell in his body.
2	"V-Victor 5"	Robert M. Leeds	Gene Roddenberry and Harold Jack Bloom	October 7, 1962
In 1933, an off-duty police officer (Karl Held) attempts to apprehend five wanted criminals in Hell's Kitchen.
3	"Harris Vs. Castro"	William Conrad	Harold Jack Bloom	October 14, 1962
Miami advertising executive Erwin Harris takes legal action against Fidel Castro to make good on an advertising contract.
4	"Code Name: Christopher (Part 1)"	Jack Webb	Otis Carney	October 21, 1962
In late 1942, a Marine Corps captain (Jack Webb) is sent to assist with the sabotage of a Nazi chemical plant in Norway.
5	"Code Name: Christopher (Part 2)"	Jack Webb	Otis Carney	October 28, 1962
Conclusion; see above.
6	"The Handmade Private"	William Conrad	Dean Riesner	November 4, 1962
During World War II, a U.S. Army corporal (Jerry Van Dyke) creates an imaginary private, who then becomes the subject of a worldwide search.
7	"The Last Day"	William Conrad	John Joseph (John Furia Jr.) & Harold Jack Bloom	November 11, 1962
During the Cold War, what appears to be a typical American town is actually a Russian spy school.
8	"Man With a Suitcase"	William Conrad	Harold Jack Bloom	November 18, 1962
A man (Bill Berger) smuggles a woman (Erika Peters) out of East Berlin in a suitcase.
9	"Mile Long Shot To Kill"	William Conrad	Harold Jack Bloom	November 25, 1962
During the Civil War, a Union Army officer develops a telescopic sight.
10	"Cheating Cheaters"	Robert M. Leeds	Harold Jack Bloom	December 2, 1962
A card game expert (Jack Hogan) is sent to a cruise ship to help investigate the death of a passenger.
11	"UXB (Unexploded Bomb)"	Robert M. Leeds	Harold Jack Bloom	December 9, 1962
Major Bill Hartley (Michael Evans) is part of a bomb disposal unit still disarming German bombs from World War II in London.
12	"The Wrong Nickel"	William Conrad	Harold Jack Bloom	December 16, 1962
A Soviet spy is eventually captured following the discovery of a modified nickel. (Note: "The Wrong Nickel" is based on Rudolf Abel and the Hollow Nickel Case.)
13	"The Amateurs"	William Conrad	Dean Riesner	December 30, 1962
In 1909, a Boston jeweler (Jonathan Hole) gets a lead to $1 million in stolen jewels from a former Harvard classmate (Vinton Hayworth).
14	"Open Season"	William Conrad	Harold Jack Bloom & Barry Oringer	January 6, 1963
Courageous Wisconsin game warden Ernie Swift (James Best) faces the reprisal of organized crime after he tickets gangster Frank MacErlane (David McLean) for illegal fishing.
15	"Defendant: Clarence Darrow"	William Conrad	Harold Jack Bloom	January 13, 1963
In 1912, Clarence Darrow (Tol Avery), the Chicago lawyer who later clashed with William Jennings Bryan over the theory of evolution at the Scopes trial, is accused of having attempted to bribe a juror. Darrow argues passionately over legal procedures with his own lawyer, Earl Rogers (Robert Vaughn).
16	"O.S.I."	William Conrad	Harold Jack Bloom	January 20, 1963
A communist spy asks for help from the Office of Special Investigations to secure the safety of his family in East Germany.
17	"Firebug"	William Conrad	John Kneubuhl	January 27, 1963
Victor Buono plays Charles Colvin, a barber in Los Angeles, who is by night a pyromaniac. The United States Forest Service believes that one arsonist is causing a series of fires. The episode also stars Keith Andes and Arch Johnson.
18	"Little Richard"	Jack Webb	Harold Jack Bloom	February 3, 1963
An Oklahoma man (Hampton Fancher) seeks help when his hunting dog becomes trapped in a hole.
19	"Escape (Part 1)"	William Conrad	Louis Morheim	February 10, 1963
An escape artist poses as an RAF officer, allows himself to be captured, and helps RAF pilots escape from a German prisoner-of-war camp. (Note: "Escape" includes escape and evasion aids created by Christopher Hutton.)
20	"Escape (Part 2)"	William Conrad	Louis Morheim	February 17, 1963
Conclusion; see above.
21	"The Moonshiners"	William Conrad	John Kneubuhl	February 24, 1963
Walter Kopek (Gene Evans), an agent of the United States Treasury Department, assumes an undercover role to halt a bootlegging operation in Florida, run by mobster Bill Munger (Robert Emhardt). James Griffith is cast in this episode as Stan Woolman.
22	"Security Risk"	William Conrad	John Kneubuhl	March 3, 1963
In 1960, George Ellsworth (Charles Aidman), an official with the United States Embassy in Warsaw, Poland, is blackmailed through a romantic affair with a young woman named Erica (Erika Peters) into passing secret information to the communists at the height of the Cold War. He confessed his guilt despite the protection of diplomatic immunity. Karl Swenson and Parley Baer also appeared in this episode.
23	"The Black-Robed Ghost"	William Conrad	Harold Jack Bloom & Maxine Robinson & John Robinson	March 10, 1963
After a young female artist dies suddenly, an aunt (Josephine Hutchinson) reports seeing her outside their home.
24	"Ordeal"	William Conrad	Harold Jack Bloom	March 17, 1963
In New Orleans, an ex-convict (Chris Robinson) kills a police sergeant, then forces his way into an apartment where he holds a family of three (the father played by Kevin Hagen) hostage.
25	"Pattern for Espionage"	William Conrad	Harold Jack Bloom	March 24, 1963
In 1954, a U.S. Army colonel, Harvey Madison (Rex Reason), is approached by a former Russian comrade-in-arms to spy for the communists. Instead, he covertly cooperates with the FBI to uncover a spy ring operated by the Soviet Union. Anthony Eisley and Gregory Walcott also appeared in this episode.
26	"The Tenth Mona Lisa"	William Conrad	Louis Morheim	March 31, 1963
In 1911, Vincenzo Peruggia (Vito Scotti) steals the Mona Lisa from the Louvre in Paris, but is apprehended by a French detective when he attempts to sell the painting to an art dealer.
27	"Gertie The Great"	Robert M. Leeds	Harold Jack Bloom	April 14, 1963
A mallard duck in Milwaukee, Wisconsin, captivates the community; Jan Shepard plays a reporter assigned to cover the story. (Note: A statue commemorating the mallard, Gertie the Duck, has been on display in Milwaukee since 1997.)
28	"Black Market"	Alan Crosland Jr.	Michael Zagor	April 21, 1963
In post-World War II Munich, an American investigator (Ron Foster) works to stop black market trafficking of cigarettes. Hanna Landy also stars.
29	"Nitro"	John Peyser	Harold Jack Bloom & Les Pine	April 28, 1963
An employee of an electroplating business in Kansas City, Missouri, accidentally makes 9 US gallons (34 L) of nitroglycerin while mixing chemicals.
30	"Heydrich (Part 1)"	William Conrad	John Kneubuhl & Harold Jack Bloom	May 5, 1963
In 1942, Nazi chief of the Reich Security Main Office, Reinhard Heydrich (Kurt Kreuger), is assassinated by Czech resistance, and Adolf Hitler takes revenge on a village. Werner Klemperer also stars as Karl Hermann Frank.
31	"Heydrich (Part 2)"	William Conrad	John Kneubuhl & Harold Jack Bloom	May 12, 1963
Conclusion; see above.
32	"Commando"	William Conrad	Michael Zagor	May 19, 1963
A safecracker (Sean McClory) is recruited to assist in a commando raid in Rome during World War II.
33	"Five Tickets to Hell"	Robert M. Leeds	Harold Jack Bloom & Richard Harbinger	May 26, 1963
In the series finale, John Quigley (Bing Russell), a Chicago mobster travels to Chihuahua, Mexico, where he robs the mint of $500,000 and kills seven men in the commission of the crime. Police Lieutenant Juan Garcia (Carlos Romero) tracks down Quigley and his three accomplices. Barbara Luna appears in this episode as Cotita.

== Guest stars ==
In addition to performers mentioned above, other notable persons who guest starred on GE True include:

- Anna-Lisa
- Philip Abbott
- Lloyd Bochner
- James T. Callahan
- Philip Carey
- James Doohan
- Don Dubbins
- David Frankham
- Stacy Harris
- Arte Johnson
- Russell Johnson
- Robert Knapp
- James Millhollin
- Mort Mills
- Jeanette Nolan
- Albert Paulsen
- Jacqueline Scott
- Simon Scott
- Malachi Throne
- Pat Woodell
