= List of Western television series =

Television Westerns are programs with settings in the later half of the 19th century in the American Old West, Western Canada, and Mexico, during the period from about 1860 to the end of the so-called "Indian Wars". More recent entries in the Western genre have used the neo-Western subgenre, placing events in the modern day, or the space Western subgenre, but still draw inspiration from the outlaw attitudes prevalent in traditional Western productions.

When television became popular in the late 1940s and 1950s, TV Westerns quickly became an audience favorite, with 30 such shows airing at prime time by 1959. Traditional Westerns faded in popularity in the late 1960s, while new shows fused Western elements with other types of shows, such as family drama, mystery thrillers, and crime drama. In the 1990s and 2000s, slickly packaged, made-for-TV movie Westerns were introduced.

== List ==
Series	Country	Duration	No. of episodes	Cast	Notes
26 Men	United States	1957–1959	78	Tristram Coffin, Kelo Henderson	
1883	United States	2021–2022	10	Sam Elliott, Tim McGraw, Faith Hill, Isabel May, LaMonica Garrett, Marc Rissmann, Audie Rick, Eric Nelsen, James Landry Hébert, Noah Le Gros	Prequel to Yellowstone; Miniseries
1923	United States	2022–2025	16	Helen Mirren, Harrison Ford, Brandon Sklenar, Julia Schlaepfer, Jerome Flynn, Darren Mann, Brian Geraghty, Aminah Nieves, Michelle Randolph, Timothy Dalton	Prequel to Yellowstone and sequel to 1883; Not a traditional Western — set in Montana during the Prohibition and the early stages of the Great Depression
The Abandons	United States	2025	7	Lena Headey, Gillian Anderson, Nick Robinson, Diana Silvers, Aisling Franciosi, Lucas Till, Lamar Johnson, Natalia del Riego	
Action in the Afternoon	United States	1953–1954		Barry Cassell, Harriss Forrest, Jack Valentine, Mary Elaine Watts	
The Adventures of Brisco County, Jr.	United States	1993–1994	27	Bruce Campbell, Julius Carry, Christian Clemenson	
The Adventures of Champion	United States	1955–1956	26	Barry Curtis, Jim Bannon	
The Adventures of Cyclone Malone	United States	1949–1951	65	Ross Jones	Nominated for a Primetime Emmy Award; Children's marionette series
The Adventures of Jim Bowie	United States	1956–1958	76	Scott Forbes	
The Adventures of Kit Carson	United States	1951–1955	103	Bill Williams, Don Diamond, Tris Coffin	
The Adventures of Rin Tin Tin	United States	1954–1959	164	Lee Aaker, James Brown, Joe Sawyer, Rand Brooks, Rin Tin Tin	Nominated for a Primetime Emmy Award
The Adventures of Wild Bill Hickok	United States	1951–1958	113	Guy Madison, Andy Devine	
The Alaskans	United States	1959–1960	37	Roger Moore, Dorothy Provine, Jeff York, Ray Danton	
Alias Smith and Jones	United States	1971–1973	50	Pete Duel, Ben Murphy, Roger Davis	
American Primeval	United States	2025	8	Taylor Kitsch, Betty Gilpin, Dane DeHaan, Saura Lightfoot-Leon, Derek Hinkey, Joe Tippett, Jai Courtney, Preston Mota, Shawnee Pourier, Shea Whigham	Set during the Utah War and the Mountain Meadows Massacre; Miniseries
The Americans	United States	1961	17	Darryl Hickman, Richard Davalos	Not a traditional Western — set during the American Civil War
An Klondike	(Republic of Ireland) Ireland	2015–2017	8	Owen McDonnell, Dara Devaney, Seán T. Ó Meallaigh, Julian Black Antelope, Ned Dennehy	Also known as Dominion Creek
Annie Oakley	United States	1954–1957	81	Gail Davis, Brad Johnson, Jimmy Hawkins, Bob Woodward	
Barbary Coast	United States	1975–1976	13	William Shatner, Dennis Cole, Doug McClure	
Bat Masterson	United States	1958–1961	107	Gene Barry	
Bearcats!	United States	1971	14	Rod Taylor, Dennis Cole	Not a traditional Western — set before the United States' entry into the First World War
Best of the West	United States	1981–1982	22	Joel Higgins	
The Big Valley	United States	1965–1969	112	Barbara Stanwyck, Richard Long, Lee Majors, Linda Evans, Peter Breck	
Billy the Kid	United States	2022–2025	24	Tom Blyth, Eileen O'Higgins, Daniel Webber, Alex Roe	Based on the outlaw of the same name
Black Saddle	United States	1959–1960	44	Peter Breck, Russell Johnson, Anna-Lisa, J. Pat O'Malley, Walter Burke	
Bonanza	United States	1959–1973	430	Lorne Greene, Pernell Roberts, Dan Blocker, Michael Landon	The second-longest-running Western series on an American television network
Boomtown	United States	1956–1974		Rex Trailer	Children's television series
Boots and Saddles	United States	1957–1958	38	John Pickard, Patrick McVey, Gardner McKay	
Bordertown	United States	1989–1991	78	John H. Brennan, Richard Comar, Sophie Barjac	
Branded	United States	1965–1966	48	Chuck Connors, William Bryant	
Brave Eagle	United States	1955–1956	26	Keith Larsen, Bert Wheeler, Kim Winona, Keena Nomkeena, Pat Hogan	
Bret Maverick	United States	1981–1982	18	James Garner, Ed Bruce, Ramon Bieri, Darleen Carr	
Broken Arrow	United States	1956–1958	73	John Lupton, Michael Ansara	Based on the film of the same name
Bronco	United States	1958–1962	68	Ty Hardin	
Buckskin	United States	1958–1959	39	Tom Nolan, Sally Brophy, Mike Road	
Buffalo Bill, Jr.	United States	1955–1956	42	Dickie Jones, Harry Cheshire, Nancy Gilbert	
The Californians	United States	1957–1959	69	Richard Coogan, Art Fleming, Herbert Rudley, Sean McClory, Adam Kennedy, Carole Mathews, Nan Leslie	
Casey Jones	United States	1957–1958	32	Alan Hale, Bobby Clark, Dub Taylor, Eddy Waller, Mary Lawrence	
Centennial	United States	1978–1979	12	Robert Conrad, Richard Chamberlain	Based on the novel of the same name
Cheyenne	United States	1955–1963	108	Clint Walker	
The Chisholms	United States	1979–1980	13	Robert Preston, Rosemary Harris, Ben Murphy, Mitchell Ryan	
Cimarron City	United States	1958–1959	26	George Montgomery, John Smith, Audrey Totter, Dan Blocker	
Cimarron Strip	United States	1967–1968	23	Stuart Whitman, Jill Townsend, Percy Herbert, Randy Boone	
Circus Boy	United States	1956–1958	49	Mickey Braddock, Noah Beery Jr., Robert Lowery, Bimbo the Elephant	
The Cisco Kid	United States	1950–1956	156	Duncan Renaldo, Leo Carrillo	One of the first television shows to be produced in color
Colt .45	United States	1957–1960	67	Wayde Preston, Donald May, Kenneth MacDonald	Based on the film of the same name
Comanche Moon	United States	2008	3	Val Kilmer, Steve Zahn, Karl Urban, Linda Cardellini, Elizabeth Banks, Ryan Merriman, Raymond McKinnon, Keith Robinson, Wes Studi, Adam Beach, James Rebhorn, Jake Busey, Melanie Lynskey, Sal Lopez, Kristine Sutherland, and Rachel Griffiths	Based on the novel of the same name Miniseries
Cowboy G-Men	United States	1952–1953	39	Russell Hayden, Jackie Coogan, Phil Arnold	
The Cowboys	United States	1974	13	Jim Davis, Belinda Balaski, Moses Gunn, Walter Brooke, Robert Carradine, A Martinez	Based on the film of the same name
Custer	United States	1967	17	Wayne Maunder, Slim Pickens, Robert F. Simon, Michael Dante, Peter Palmer	
The Dakotas	United States	1963	20	Larry Ward, Jack Elam, Chad Everett, Mike Greene	
Daniel Boone	United States	1964–1970	165	Fess Parker, Patricia Blair, Albert Salmi, Ed Ames, Dallas McKennon, Rosey Grier	
Davy Crockett	United States	1954–1955	5	Fess Parker, Buddy Ebsen, Jeff York	Aired as part of the Disneyland anthology television series
Dead Man's Gun	United States	1997–1999	44	Kris Kristofferson	
Dead Man's Walk	United States	1996	3	David Arquette, Jonny Lee Miller	Based on the novel of the same name
Deadwood	United States	2004–2006	36	Timothy Olyphant, Ian McShane, Molly Parker	Followed by Deadwood: The Movie
Death Valley Days	United States	1952–1970	452	Stanley Andrews, Ronald Reagan, Rosemary DeCamp, Robert Taylor, Dale Robertson	
The Deputy	United States	1959–1961	76	Henry Fonda, Allen Case, Read Morgan, Wallace Ford, Betty Lou Keim	
Destry	United States	1964	13	John Gavin	
Dick Powell's Zane Grey Theatre	United States	1956–1961	146	Dick Powell	
Dirty Sally	United States	1974	13	Jeanette Nolan, Dack Rambo	The last half-hour Western series on an American television network
Django	Italy	2023	10	Matthias Schoenaerts, Nicholas Pinnock, Lisa Vicari, Noomi Rapace	Reimagining of the fictional character of the same name Spaghetti Western
Dr. Quinn, Medicine Woman	United States	1993–1998	150	Jane Seymour, Joe Lando, Chad Allen	
Dundee and the Culhane	United States	1967	13	John Mills, Sean Garrison	
Dusty's Trail	United States	1973–1974	26	Bob Denver, Forrest Tucker, Ivor Francis, Jeannine Riley, Lori Saunders, Lynn Wood, Bill Cort	Television sitcom which reworked the basic premise of Gilligan's Island
Empire	United States	1962–1963	32	Richard Egan, Terry Moore, Ryan O'Neal	Not a traditional Western — set in the modern day
The English	United Kingdom	2022	6	Emily Blunt, Chaske Spencer	Miniseries
F Troop	United States	1965–1967	65	Forrest Tucker, Larry Storch, Ken Berry, Melody Patterson	Television sitcom
Father Murphy	United States	1981–1983	35	Merlin Olsen, Katherine Cannon, Timothy Gibbs, Moses Gunn	
Four Feather Falls	United Kingdom	1960	39	Nicholas Parsons, Kenneth Connor, David Graham, Denise Bryer	Children's marionette series
Frontier	United States	1955–1956	31	Walter Coy	
Frontier Circus	United States	1961–1962	26	J. Pat O'Malley, Chill Wills	
Frontier Doctor	United States	1958–1959	39	Rex Allen	
Frontier Justice	United States	1958–1961	31	Lew Ayres, Melvyn Douglas, Ralph Bellamy	
Fury	United States	1955–1960	116	Peter Graves, Bobby Diamond, Jimmy Baird, William Fawcett, Roger Mobley	
The Gabby Hayes Show	United States	1950–1956		George "Gabby" Hayes	Children's television series
The Gene Autry Show	United States	1950–1956	91	Gene Autry, Pat Buttram, Bob Woodward, Champion the Horse	
Godless	United States	2017	7	Jack O'Connell, Michelle Dockery, Scoot McNairy, Merritt Wever, Thomas Brodie-Sangster, Tantoo Cardinal, Kim Coates, Sam Waterston, Jeff Daniels	Miniseries
The Gray Ghost	United States	1957–1958	39	Tod Andrews, Phil Chambers	
Gun Shy	United States	1983	6	Barry Van Dyke, Tim Thomerson, Geoffrey Lewis	Television sitcom
The Guns of Will Sonnett	United States	1967–1969	50	Walter Brennan, Dack Rambo	
Gunslinger	United States	1961	12	Tony Young	
Gunsmoke	United States	1955–1975	635	James Arness, Milburn Stone, Amanda Blake, Ken Curtis, Buck Taylor, Dennis Weaver, Burt Reynolds	Longest-running American prime-time drama until it was surpassed by Law & Order: Special Victims Unit in 2019
Harts of the West	United States	1993–1994	15	Beau Bridges, Lloyd Bridges, Harley Jane Kozak	
Have Gun – Will Travel	United States	1957–1963	225	Richard Boone, Kam Tong	
Hawkeye and the Last of the Mohicans	United States	1957	39	John Hart, Lon Chaney Jr.	Based on the novel of the same name
Hawkeye: The First Frontier	United States	1994–1995	22	Lee Horsley, Lynda Carter, Rodney A. Grant	Based on the novel of the same name
Hec Ramsey	United States	1972–1974	10	Richard Boone	
Hell on Wheels	United States	2011–2016	57	Anson Mount, Colm Meaney, Common, Dominique McElligott, Tom Noonan, Eddie Spears, Ben Esler, Phil Burke, Christopher Heyerdahl, Robin McLeavy, Kasha Kropinski, Dohn Norwood, Jennifer Ferrin, MacKenzie Porter	Set during the construction of the first transcontinental railroad
Here Come the Brides	United States	1968–1970	52	Robert Brown, David Soul, Bobby Sherman, Bridget Hanley, Mark Lenard, Joan Blondell	
The High Chaparral	United States	1967–1971	98	Leif Erickson, Cameron Mitchell	
Hondo	United States	1967	17	Ralph Taeger	Based on the film of the same name
Hopalong Cassidy	United States	1949–1954	52	William Boyd	
Hotel de Paree	United States	1959–1960	33	Earl Holliman, Jeanette Nolan, Judi Meredith, Strother Martin	
How the West Was Won	United States	1976–1979	25	James Arness, Bruce Boxleitner, Fionnula Flanagan	Based on the film of the same name
Hudson's Bay	Canada	1959		Barry Nelson, George Tobias	
Into the West	United States	2005	6	Matthew Settle, Joseph M. Marshall III	Miniseries
The Iron Horse	United States	1966–1968	47	Dale Robertson, Robert Random, Gary Collins, Ellen Burstyn	
Jefferson Drum	United States	1958	26	Jeff Richards, Eugene Mazzola, Cyril Delevanti, Robert J. Stevenson	
Joe Pickett	United States	2021–2023	20	Michael Dorman, Julianna Guill, Sharon Lawrence, Paul Sparks, Mustafa Speaks, Skywalker Hughes, Kamryn Pliva, David Alan Grier, Chad Rook, Aadila Dosani, Keean Johnson, Vivienne Guynn	Not a traditional Western — a neo-Western set in modern-day Wyoming
Johnny Ringo	United States	1959–1960	38	Don Durant, Mark Goddard, Karen Sharpe, Terence De Marney	
Judge Roy Bean	United States	1955–1956	39	Edgar Buchanan, Jack Buetel, Jackie Loughery	
Klondike	United States	1960–1961	17	Ralph Taeger, James Coburn, Joi Lansing	
Kung Fu	United States	1972–1975	63	David Carradine	
Lancer	United States	1968–1970	51	James Stacy, Wayne Maunder, Andrew Duggan, Elizabeth Baur	
Laramie	United States	1959–1963	124	John Smith, Robert Fuller	
Laredo	United States	1965–1967	56	Neville Brand, William Smith, Peter Brown, Philip Carey	
Law of the Plainsman	United States	1959–1960	30	Michael Ansara, Gina Gillespie, Robert Harland, Dayton Lummis, Nora Marlowe	
Lawman	United States	1958–1962	156	John Russell, Peter Brown, Peggie Castle	
Lawmen: Bass Reeves	United States	2023	8	David Oyelowo, Lauren E. Banks, Demi Singleton, Forrest Goodluck, Barry Pepper, Dennis Quaid, Grantham Coleman, Donald Sutherland	Based on the lawman of the same name Miniseries
The Lazarus Man	United States	1996	22	Robert Urich	
Legacy	United States	1998–1999	18	Brett Cullen, Jeremy Vincent Garrett, Grayson McCouch, Sharon Leal, Lea Moreno, Steven Williams	
Legend	United States	1995	12	Richard Dean Anderson, John de Lancie	
The Legend of Jesse James	United States	1965–1966	34	Christopher Jones, Allen Case, Ann Doran, Robert J. Wilke, John Milford	
The Life and Legend of Wyatt Earp	United States	1955–1961	226	Hugh O'Brian, Mason Alan Dinehart, Douglas Fowley	
The Life and Times of Grizzly Adams	United States	1977–1978	38	Dan Haggerty, Denver Pyle, Don Shanks	Based on the novel of the same name
Little House on the Prairie	United States	1974–1983	203	Michael Landon, Karen Grassle, Melissa Gilbert, Melissa Sue Anderson, Matthew Laborteaux	Not a traditional Western — a family drama set in frontier Minnesota
The Lone Ranger	United States	1949–1957	221	Clayton Moore, Jay Silverheels	
The Loner	United States	1965–1966	26	Lloyd Bridges	
Lonesome Dove	United States	1989	4	Robert Duvall, Tommy Lee Jones, Danny Glover, Diane Lane, Anjelica Huston	Miniseries
Lonesome Dove: The Series	United States	1995–1996	22	Scott Bairstow, Eric McCormack, Christianne Hirt, Kelly Rowan	Sequel to Lonesome Dove; Known as Lonesome Dove: The Outlaw Years for the second season
Lucky Luke	Italy	1992	8	Terence Hill	Western-comedy; Spaghetti Western
Mackenzie's Raiders	United States	1958–1959	39	Richard Carlson	
The Magnificent Seven	United States	1998–2000	31	Michael Biehn, Eric Close, Anthony Starke, Ron Perlman, Rick Worthy, Andrew Kavovit, Dale Midkiff	Based on the film of the same name
A Man Called Shenandoah	United States	1965–1966	34	Robert Horton	
The Man from Blackhawk	United States	1959–1960	37	Robert Rockwell	
Man Without a Gun	United States	1957–1959	52	Rex Reason, Mort Mills, Harry Harvey, Sr.	
The Marshal of Gunsight Pass	United States	1950	22	Russell Hayden, Eddie Dean	
Matt and Jenny on the Wilderness Trail	Canada	1979	26	Derrick Jones, Megan Follows	
Maverick	United States	1957–1962	124	James Garner, Jack Kelly, Roger Moore, Robert Colbert	
The Monroes	United States	1966–1967	26	Michael Anderson Jr., Barbara Hershey, Keith Schultz, Kevin Schultz, Tammy Locke	
My Friend Flicka	United States	1956–1957	39	Johnny Washbrook, Gene Evans, Anita Louise, Frank Ferguson	
Nichols	United States	1971–1972	24	James Garner, Margot Kidder, Stuart Margolin, Alice Ghostley	
The Nine Lives of Elfego Baca	United States	1958–1960	10	Robert Loggia, Robert F. Simon, Lisa Montell	Aired as part of the Disneyland anthology television series
Northwest Passage	United States	1958–1959	26	Keith Larsen, Buddy Ebsen, Don Burnett	Based on the novel of the same name
The Oregon Trail	United States	1977	14	Rod Taylor, Andrew Stevens, Darleen Carr, Charles Napier	
The Outcasts	United States	1968–1969	26	Don Murray, Otis Young	
Outer Range	United States	2022–2024	15	Josh Brolin, Imogen Poots, Lili Taylor, Tamara Podemski, Lewis Pullman, Noah Reid, Shaun Sipos, Olive Elise Abercrombie, Isabel Arraiza	Not a traditional Western — a sci-fi neo-Western set in modern-day Wyoming
Outlaws	United States	1960–1962	50	Barton MacLane, Don Collier, Bruce Yarnell, Slim Pickens, Judy Lewis, Jock Gaynor	
Outlaws	United States	1986–1987	12	Rod Taylor, William Lucking, Patrick Houser, Charles Napier, Richard Roundtree	Sci-fi Western
Overland Trail	United States	1960	17	William Bendix, Doug McClure	
Paradise	United States	1988–1991	56	Lee Horsley, Jenny Beck	
Peacemakers	Canada; United States	2003	9	Tom Berenger	
The Pinkertons	Canada	2014	22	Martha MacIsaac, Jacob Blair, Angus Macfadyen	
Pistols 'n' Petticoats	United States	1966–1967	26	Ann Sheridan, Ruth McDevitt, Carole Wells, Douglas Fowley, Gary Vinson	Television sitcom
Ponderosa	United States	2001–2002	20	Daniel Hugh Kelly, Matthew Carmody, Drew Powell, Jared Daperis	
Pony Express	United States	1959–1960	35	Grant Sullivan, Don Dorrell	
Queen of Swords	Canada; United Kingdom; Spain	2000–2001	22	Tessie Santiago, Paulina Galvez, Valentine Pelka, Anthony Lemke, Peter Wingfield, Elsa Pataky	Nominated for a Primetime Emmy Award; Filmed at Texas Hollywood, Almeria, Spain
The Quest	United States	1976	15	Kurt Russell, Tim Matheson	
Quick Draw	United States	2013–2014	18	John Lehr, Nick Brown, Allison Dunbar	Television sitcom
The Range Rider	United States	1951–1953	79	Jock Mahoney, Dick Jones	
Rango	United States	1967	17	Tim Conway, Guy Marks, Norman Alden	Television sitcom
Rawhide	United States	1959–1966	217	Eric Fleming, Clint Eastwood, Paul Brinegar, Sheb Wooley, John Ireland, Raymond St. Jacques	
The Rebel	United States	1959–1961	76	Nick Adams	
Redigo	United States	1963	15	Richard Egan, Rudy Solari, Roger Davis	Not a traditional Western — set in the modern day Sequel to Empire
Red Ryder	United States	1951	1	Jim Bannon	
Red Ryder	United States	1956	1	Allan Lane	
Red Serge	Canada	1986–1987	12	Ed McNamara, Nicola Cavendish, Tom McBeath, C. David Johnson, Gordon Tootoosis, Terence Kelly	
The Restless Gun	United States	1957–1959	78	John Payne	
The Rifleman	United States	1958–1963	168	Chuck Connors, Johnny Crawford, Paul Fix	
Riverboat	United States	1959–1961	44	Darren McGavin, Burt Reynolds, Noah Beery Jr.	
The Road West	United States	1966–1967	29	Barry Sullivan, Kathryn Hays, Andrew Prine, Glenn Corbett, Brenda Scott, Kelly Corcoran, Charles Seel	
The Rough Riders	United States	1958–1959	39	Kent Taylor, Jan Merlin, Peter Whitney	
The Rounders	United States	1966–1967	17	Ron Hayes, Patrick Wayne, Chill Wills, Walker Edmiston, Strother Martin, James Brown	
The Roy Rogers Show	United States	1951–1957	100	Roy Rogers, Dale Evans, Pat Brady, Trigger, the Golden Palomino, Bullet the Wonder Dog	
Sara	United States	1976	12	Brenda Vaccaro, Jerry Hardin, Michael LeClair	Nominated for a Primetime Emmy Award
Sergeant Preston of the Yukon	United States	1955–1958	78	Dick Simmons	
Shane	United States	1966	17	David Carradine, Bert Freed, Jill Ireland	
The Sheriff of Cochise	United States	1956–1958	138	John Bromfield, Stan Jones	Not a traditional Western — set in the modern day Known as U.S. Marshal for its second season
Shotgun Slade	United States	1959–1961	78	Scott Brady	
Sky King	United States	1951–1959	72	Kirby Grant, Gloria Winters, Ron Hagerthy, Ewing Mitchell, Chubby Johnson	
The Son	United States	2017–2019	20	Pierce Brosnan, Jacob Lofland, Henry Garrett, Paola Núñez, Carlos Bardem, Zahn McClarnon, Jess Weixler, David Wilson Barnes, Sydney Lucas, James Parks, Elizabeth Frances, Shane Graham, Kathryn Prescott	Based on the novel of the same name Set simultaneously in 1849, 1915, and the modern day
Stagecoach West	United States	1960–1961	38	Wayne Rogers, Robert Bray, Richard Eyer	
State Trooper	United States	1956–1959	104	Rod Cameron, Robert Armstrong	Not a traditional Western — set in modern-day Nevada
Steve Donovan, Western Marshal	United States	1955–1956	39	Douglas Kennedy, Eddy Waller	
Stoney Burke	United States	1962–1963	32	Jack Lord, Warren Oates, Robert Dowdell, Bruce Dern	
Stories of the Century	United States	1954–1955	39	Jim Davis	
Strange Empire	Canada	2014–2015	13	Cara Gee, Melissa Farman, Tattiawna Jones, Aaron Poole	
Sugarfoot	United States	1957–1961	69	Will Hutchins, Jack Elam	
Tales of the Texas Rangers	United States	1955–1958	52	Willard Parker, Harry Lauter	
Tales of Wells Fargo	United States	1957–1962	200	Dale Robertson, William Demarest, Virginia Christine, Jack Ging	
The Tall Man	United States	1960–1962	75	Barry Sullivan, Clu Gulager	
Tate	United States	1960	13	David McLean	
Temple Houston	United States	1963–1964	26	Jeffrey Hunter, Jack Elam, James Best, Frank Ferguson, Chubby Johnson, Mary Wickes	
The Texan	United States	1958–1960	78	Rory Calhoun	
Texas John Slaughter	United States	1958–1961	17	Tom Tryon	Aired as part of the Disneyland anthology television series
Texas Rising	United States	2015	5	Bill Paxton, Jeffrey Dean Morgan, Ray Liotta, Brendan Fraser, Olivier Martinez, Cynthia Addai-Robinson	Miniseries
That Dirty Black Bag	Italy	2022	8	Douglas Booth, Dominic Cooper, Niv Sultan, Guido Caprino, Christian Cooke, Rose Williams, Paterson Joseph, Zoe Boyle, Ivan Shaw, Daniel Caltagirone, Benjamin Stender, Guido Caprino, Eugene Brave Rock, Anna Chancellor	Spaghetti Western
Tombstone Territory	United States	1957–1960	93	Pat Conway, Richard Eastham, Gilman Rankin	
Trackdown	United States	1957–1959	70	Robert Culp, Ellen Corby, Peter Leeds	
The Travels of Jaimie McPheeters	United States	1963–1964	26	Kurt Russell, Dan O'Herlihy, Charles Bronson, Donna Anderson, Michael Witney, Meg Wyllie	Based on the novel of the same name
Two Faces West	United States	1960–1961	39	Charles Bateman, Francis De Sales, Joyce Meadows, Paul Comi	
Union Pacific	United States	1958–1959	38	Jeff Morrow, Judson Pratt, Susan Cummings	
The Virginian	United States	1962–1971	249	James Drury, Doug McClure	
Wagon Train	United States	1957–1965	284	Ward Bond, Robert Horton, John McIntire, Robert Fuller	
Walker: Independence	United States	2022–2023	13	Katherine McNamara, Matt Barr, Katie Findlay, Greg Hovanessian, Philemon Chambers, Justin Johnson, Lawrence Kao, Gabriela Quezada	Prequel to Walker
Wanted: Dead or Alive	United States	1958–1961	94	Steve McQueen	
The Westerner	United States	1960	13	Brian Keith, John Dehner	
Whiplash	Australia; United Kingdom	1960–1961	34	Peter Graves, Anthony Wickert	
Whispering Smith	United States	1961	26	Audie Murphy, Guy Mitchell, Sam Buffington	Based on the film of the same name
Wichita Town	United States	1959–1960	26	Joel McCrea, Jody McCrea, Carlos Romero, George Neise, Robert Foulk	Based on the film Wichita
Wide Country	United States	1962–1963	28	Earl Holliman, Andrew Prine, Slim Pickens	
Wild West C.O.W.-Boys of Moo Mesa	United States	1992–1994	26	Pat Fraley, Jim Cummings, Jeff Bennett, Joe Piscopo, Kay Lenz, Troy Davidson	Animated television series
The Wild Wild West	United States	1965–1969	104	Robert Conrad, Ross Martin	
Wildside	United States	1985	6	Howard Rollins, William Smith, Sandy McPeak, J. Eddie Peck, Terry Funk, John D'Aquino, Meg Ryan	
WinneToons	Germany	2002	26	Sascha Draeger, Michael Lott, Marco Kroeger, Wolf Rahtjen, Ralf Wolter, Celine Fontanges, Günter Lüdke, Beate Hasenau	Animated television series based on characters from the novel Winnetou I
Wrangler	United States	1960	6	Jason Evers	
Yancy Derringer	United States	1958–1959	34	Jock Mahoney, X Brands, Frances Bergen	
The Yellow Rose	United States	1983–1984	22	Sam Elliott, David Soul, Edward Albert, Cybill Shepherd, Chuck Connors, Noah Beery Jr., Ken Curtis, Robin Wright, Jane Russell	Not a traditional Western — a serial set in modern-day Texas
Yellowstone	United States	2018–2024	53	Kevin Costner, Luke Grimes, Kelly Reilly, Wes Bentley, Cole Hauser, Kelsey Asbille, Brecken Merrill, Jefferson White, Danny Huston, Gil Birmingham, Forrie J. Smith, Denim Richards	Not a traditional Western — a neo-Western set in modern-day Montana
Young Dan'l Boone	United States	1977	4	Rick Moses	
Young Maverick	United States	1979	8	Charles Frank, Susan Blanchard, John Dehner, Howard Duff, John McIntire, Donna Mills, Harry Dean Stanton, James Woods	
The Young Pioneers	United States	1978	3	Linda Purl, Roger Kern, Mare Winningham, Robert Donner, Robert Hays, Jeff Cotler	
The Young Riders	United States	1989–1992	68	Stephen Baldwin, Josh Brolin, Brett Cullen, Travis Fine, Don Franklin, Melissa Leo, Ty Miller, Christopher Pettiet, Gregg Rainwater, Yvonne Suhor, Clare Wren, Anthony Zerbe	
Zorro	United States	1957–1961	78	Guy Williams, Gene Sheldon, Henry Calvin, George J. Lewis	Four specials aired as part of the Disneyland anthology television series
Zorro	United States	1990–1993	88	Duncan Regehr, Patrice Martinez, James Victor, Juan Diego Botto	Nominated for a Young Artist Award; Filmed in Madrid, Spain
Zorro and Son	United States	1983	5	Henry Darrow, Paul Regina, Bill Dana	Television sitcom

== See also ==
- Western (genre)
- Westerns on television
- List of contemporary Westerns
