= Pony Express (TV series) =

American western television series

- Genre: Western
- Written by: Paul King; Joseph Stone; Budd Lesser; John Meredyth Lucas; Sam Peckinpah
- Directed by: Frank McDonald; Jean Yarbrough
- Starring: Grant Sullivan; Don Dorrell
- Country of origin: United States
- Original language: English
- No. of seasons: 1
- No. of episodes: 35

Production
- Producers: Tom McKnight; Robert Stillman
- Camera setup: Single-camera
- Running time: 25 mins.
- Production company: California National Productions

Original release
- Network: Syndication
- Release: October 7, 1959 – May 31, 1960

Pony Express is an American Western television series about the adventures of an agent in the 1860s of the Central Overland Express Company, better known as the Pony Express. The half-hour program starring Grant Sullivan and Don Dorrell was created by California National Productions. Pony Express ran for thirty-five episodes in syndication from the fall of October 1959 until May 1960. In its final days, the series just managed to coincide with the centennial of the Pony Express (April 3, 1860).

== Overview ==
The series featured two recurring roles: Grant Sullivan as Brett Clark, a roving investigator for the company, and Don Dorrell as Donovan, a young Pony Express rider. The majority of the weekly episodes involved Clark and Donovan solving various Pony Express mysteries.

== Production ==
Pony Express was filmed at Iverson Movie Ranch in Chatsworth in Los Angeles County, California. It was one of several western-themed television shows produced by CNP, such as Boots and Saddles (1957–1958). CNP created the series for the 100th anniversary of the actual Pony Express.

The Pony Express pilot, the first Western television pilot shot in color, was shot in February 1957 with James Best in the lead. This version did not sell (although Best was included in a TV Guide photo feature on upcoming TV westerns in June of that year) but was later aired, slightly re-edited, as an episode of the syndicated series.

== Guest stars ==
- Claude Akins
- Robert Anderson
- James Best
- George Brenlin
- Steve Brodie
- Whitney Blake
- Sebastian Cabot
- Paul Carr
- Walter Coy
- Ross Elliott
- William Fawcett
- Joe Flynn
- Douglas Fowley
- Dabbs Greer
- Rex Holman
- Dale Ishimoto
- I. Stanford Jolley
- Dick Jones
- Douglas Kennedy
- Ethan Laidlaw
- Norman Leavitt
- Bethel Leslie
- Nobu McCarthy
- Howard McNear
- Mort Mills
- Donald Murphy
- Gregg Palmer
- James Parnell
- Slim Pickens
- Denver Pyle
- Burt Reynolds
- Madlyn Rhue

== Episodes ==
No. in season	Title	Directed by	Written by	Original release date
1	"The Story Of Julesberg"	Lewis R. Foster	Story by : Teleplay by : Sam Peckinpah	TBA
2	"The Killer"	James Nielsen	Story by : Tony Barrett; Teleplay by : Jack Laird	TBA
3	"The Replacement"	Jean Yabrough	Story by : Teleplay by : John Meredyth Lucas	TBA
4	"The Last Mile"	Frank Adreon	Story by : Teleplay by : Joe Stone and Paul King	TBA
5	"Payoff"	TBA	Story by : Teleplay by :	TBA
6	"Wrong Rope"	Jean Yabrough	Story by : Teleplay by : Budd Lesser	TBA
7	"The Deadly Sniper"	Jean Yabrough	Story by : Teleplay by : Lee Berg and Harry Clork	TBA
8	"Justice For Jenny"	TBA	Story by : Teleplay by :	TBA
9	"The Treaty"	TBA	Story by : Teleplay by :	TBA
10	"Message From New Orleans"	Frank McDonald	Story by : Teleplay by : William R. Cox and Harry Clork	TBA
11	"The Good Samaritan"	Jean Yabrough	Story by : Teleplay by : Rudy Makoul and Joel Rogosin	TBA
12	"The Peace Offering"	TBA	Story by : Teleplay by :	TBA
13	"The Wrong Man"	TBA	Story by : Teleplay by :	TBA
14	"The Reluctant Bride"	TBA	Story by : Teleplay by :	TBA
15	"Lady's Choice"	TBA	Story by : Teleplay by :	TBA
16	"Token Payment"	TBA	Story by : Teleplay by : Budd Lesser	TBA
17	"We Ourselves"	TBA	Story by : Teleplay by :	TBA
18	"Showdown At Thirty Mile Ridge"	TBA	Story by : Teleplay by :	TBA
19	"Bandido"	Frank McDonald	Story by : Teleplay by : Joe Stone and Paul King	TBA
20	"Princess Of Crazy Creek"	Frank McDonald	Story by : Teleplay by : Joe Stone and Paul King	TBA
21	"The Theft"	TBA	Story by : Teleplay by :	TBA
22	"Duel At Devil's Canyon"	TBA	Story by : Teleplay by :	TBA
23	"Vendetta"	TBA	Story by : Teleplay by :	TBA
24	"Mail For A Male"	TBA	Story by : Teleplay by :	TBA
25	"The Breadwinner"	TBA	Story by : Teleplay by :	TBA
26	"The Golden Circle"	TBA	Story by : Teleplay by :	TBA
27	"The Station Keeper's Bride"	TBA	Story by : Teleplay by :	TBA
28	"The Pendant"	TBA	Story by : Teleplay by :	TBA
29	"Special Delivery"	TBA	Story by : Teleplay by :	TBA
30	"The Wedding Of Big Zack"	Frank McDonald	Story by : Teleplay by : Raphael Hayes	TBA
31	"The Renegade"	TBA	Story by : Teleplay by :	TBA
32	"Trial By Fury"	TBA	Story by : Teleplay by :	TBA
33	"Reclaim"	TBA	Story by : Teleplay by :	TBA
34	"Ghost Of Caribou Ridge"	Frank McDonald	Story by : Teleplay by : Joe Stone and Paul King	TBA
35	"The Search"	Frank McDonald	Story by : Teleplay by : John Meredyth Lucas	TBA

== See also ==
- Pony Express, film
