= Devon Ericson =

American actress

- Born: Salt Lake City, Utah, U.S.
- Years active: 1974–1991

Devon Ericson is a retired American actress and cover singer.

== Early years ==
Ericson was born in Salt Lake City and was named for Devon, England. Her mother, Audrey Planty, won British ice-skating championships and toured with the Ice Follies in the United States. Her father was an American of Swedish descent. They separated when Ericson was 8 years old, and she moved with her mother to San Diego, where her mother operated an ice rink.

As a youngster, Ericson participated in contests in speech and debate. She attended the school of performing arts at United States International University in San Diego and later studied at its satellite campus at Ashdown Park, England.

== Career ==
Ericson first performed professionally in England, acting in As You Like It and dancing in a revue. She came to the United States to act in the play Pajama Tops in Philadelphia. After that, she debuted on American television as John-Boy Walton's girlfriend on The Waltons. She later portrayed Betsy O'Neal in The Chisholms, Rachel Peters in Family, and Rebecca Bryan in Young Dan'l Boone.

She guested on such series as Barnaby Jones, Police Story, Starsky & Hutch, The Streets of San Francisco, Three's Company, Magnum, P.I., Buck Rogers in the 25th Century, Knight Rider, Airwolf, The A-Team, and The Awakening Land, as well as the miniseries Eleanor and Franklin and Studs Lonigan.

== Filmography ==
=== Film ===
Year	Title	Role
1975	Return to Macon County	Betty
1984	Night of the Comet	Minder
1986	Say Yes	Cynthia

=== Television ===
Year	Title	Role	Notes
1974	The Waltons	Polly Thompson	Episode: "The First Day"
1974	The Texas Wheelers	Janie	Episode: "The X-Rated Movie"
1974	The Manhunter	Jamie Bellows	Episode: "A.W.O.L. to Kill"
1975	The Dream Makers	Carol	Television film
1975	ABC Afterschool Special	Lily Degley	Episode: "The Skating Rink"
1975	The Runaway Barge	June Bug Dobbs	Television film
1975–1979	Barnaby Jones	Various roles	4 episodes
1975–1977	The Streets of San Francisco	Vicky Kincaid / Jackie Collins	Episodes: "Most Likely to Succeed" and "Once a Con"
1976	Movin' On	Lila Hinshaw	Episode: "The Old South Will Rise Again"
1976	Eleanor and Franklin	Corinne Robinson	2 episodes
1976	Stranded	Julie Blake	Television film
1976	Starsky & Hutch	Kitty	2 episodes
1977	Police Story	Ariana	Episode: "The Malflores"
1977	Most Wanted	Julia Neal	Episode: "The Ritual Killer"
1977	Busting Loose	Julie	Episode: "Love's Labor Lost"
1977	Westside Medical	Carol Manolas	Episode: "Red Blanket for a City"
1977	Testimony of Two Men	Priscilla "Prissy" Madden Witherby	Mini-series
1977	Disneyland	Penny Wainwright	Episode: "The Bluegrass Special"
1978	The Awakening Land	Huldah Wheeler	Episode: "Part III: The Town"
1978	The Busters	Marty Hamilton	Television film
1977–1978	Young Dan'l Boone	Rebecca Ryan	5 episodes
1978	Three's Company	Jenny Wood	Episode: "My Sister's Keeper"
1978	Ishi: The Last of His Tribe	Lushi as Teenager	Television film
1979	Studs Lonigan	Fran Lonigan	3 episodes
1979	Lou Grant	Cheryl	Episode: "Romance"
1979	Can You Hear the Laughter? The Story of Freddie Prinze	Kathy	Television film
1979–1980	Family	Rachel Peters	Episodes: "'Tis the Season" and "Play on Love"
1980	The Chisholms	Betsy O'Neal	6 episodes
1980	When the Whistle Blows	Jenny	Episode: "Macho Man"
1980	Baby Comes Home	Elizabeth Kramer Winston	Television film
1980	CHiPs	Judy	Episode: "Wheels of Justice"
1981	Quincy, M.E.	Kate Mills	Episode: "To Kill in Plain Sight"
1981	Buck Rogers in the 25th Century	Asteria Eleefa	Episode: "The Dorian Secret"
1981	Magnum, P.I.	Jennifer "Jenny" Chapman	Episode: "Tropical Madness"
1981–1986	It's a Living	Jane Foley / Beverly Gradey	Episodes: "The Wedding" and "Jealous Wife"
1982	Knight Rider	Robin Ladd	Episode: "Deadly Maneuvers"
1983	The A-Team	Ellen Penhall	Episode: "West Cost Turnaround"
1984	Hotel	Margo White	Episode: "Memories"
1984	The Mystic Warrior	Heyatawin	Television film/mini-series
1984	The Love Boat	Ellen Brown	1 episode
1985	Hunter	Loretta Johnson	Episode: "Guilty"
1985	Trapper John, M.D.	Jan Brown	Episode: "Just Around the Coroner"
1985	Airwolf	Hana / Tracey Cooper	Episodes: "Dambreakers" and "Kingdom Come"
1986	St. Elsewhere	Katherine Auschlander	Episode: "Time Heals: Part 2"
1986	Gone to Texas	Tiana Rogers	Television film
1987	Mathnet	Maureen O'Reilly	Episode: "The Mystery of the Maltese Pigeon"
1987	Square One Television	Maureen O'Rilley	4 episodes
1991	Shades of LA	Stacy	Episode: "Till Death Do Us Part"
