= Pleasures =

- Genre: Drama
- Based on: Pleasures: Women Write Erotica by Lonnie Garfield Barbach
- Screenplay by: Jill Gordon
- Directed by: Sharron Miller
- Starring: Joanna Cassidy; Barry Bostwick; Linda Purl; Rick Moses; Tracy Nelson
- Theme music composer: Lee Holdridge
- Country of origin: United States
- Original language: English

Production
- Executive producers: Gregory Harrison; Franklin R. Levy; Matthew Rushton
- Producers: Jon C. Andersen; Peter Katz
- Production locations: Cozumel; Los Angeles; Malibu, California; Mérida, Yucatán
- Cinematography: Fred Koenekamp (credited as Fred J. Koenekamp)
- Editors: Richard Bracken; Art Stafford
- Running time: 96 minutes
- Production companies: The Catalina Production Group; Columbia Pictures Television

Original release
- Network: ABC
- Release: March 31, 1986

Pleasures is a 1986 American television film written by Jill Gordon and directed by Sharron Miller. Its cast includes Joanna Cassidy, Barry Bostwick, Linda Purl, Rick Moses and Tracy Nelson.

== Plot ==
Three related women have summer romances in this drama. The first has recently been deserted by her husband. When an old college beau shows up, sparks fly. Meanwhile her sister is wrestling with a rock star. And finally her daughter goes abroad and gets involved with a non-English speaking young man.

== Cast ==
- Joanna Cassidy as Lillian Benton
- Linda Purl as Eve Harper
- Tracy Nelson as Annie Benton
- Rick Moses as Niles Perry
- Pamela Adlon as Claudia (credited as Pamela Segall)
- David Paymer as Stanley
- Sasha Mitchell as Antonio
- Barry Bostwick as Ben Scott
- Pamela Dunlap as Elaine
- Elizabeth Kerr as Mrs. Gilroy
- Richard Gates as Fred
- Perla Walter as Mrs. Santole
- Rif Hutton as rock manager
- Rick Gibbs as David
- Jorge Russek as Ritherman
- Luis Gomez as Mauricio
- Alec Murdock as drunk
- Pamela Kwong as 1st groupie
- Naia Hannah Haast as 2nd groupie
- Mary-Margaret Lewis as Claudia's mom
- Ruby Handler as Jeff's girlfriend
- Quinn Cummings (uncredited)

== Production ==
The film was produced by Catalina Productions and Columbia Television. Filming wrapped in the second week of February 1986. Sharron Miller directed, with Jill Gordon writing the script based on the book Pleasures: Women Write Erotica by Lonnie Garfield Barbach. Lee Holdridge provided the score, with songs by Rick Moses and Marc Donahue. Ross Bellah and Sidney Z Litwick provided the art direction. Fred J. Koenekamp directed cinematography, with film editing handled by Art Stafford and Richard Bracken. The film was produced by Peter Katz, with Jon Anderson as a co-producer and Franklin R. Levy, Gregory Harrison, and Matthew Rushton as executive producers.

== Release ==
The film aired as the ABC Monday Night Movie on March 31, 1986.

== See also ==
- List of television films produced for American Broadcasting Company
