= Avalanche (1978 film) =

1978 film by Corey Allen

- Theatrical release poster
- Directed by: Corey Allen
- Written by: Corey Allen; Claude Pola
- Story by: Frances Doel
- Produced by: Roger Corman
- Starring: Rock Hudson; Mia Farrow; Robert Forster; Jeanette Nolan; Rick Moses
- Cinematography: Pierre-William Glenn
- Edited by: Larry Bock; Skip Schoolnik
- Music by: William Kraft
- Distributed by: New World Pictures
- Release date: August 30, 1978 (United States)
- Running time: 91 minutes
- Country: United States
- Language: English
- Budget: $6.5 million
- Box office: $87,000

Avalanche is a 1978 American disaster film directed by Corey Allen, featuring Rock Hudson, Mia Farrow, Robert Forster, and Jeanette Nolan.

The plot revolves around David Shelby, who owns a ski resort in an avalanche-prone area. As the resort opens with a grand event, tensions arise between David and his ex-wife, Caroline, who is drawn to an environmental photographer named Nick. A tragic avalanche occurs during the festivities, causing significant destruction and loss of life. The film explores the rescue efforts and aftermath, depicting the impact on the characters' lives.

Avalanche was one of the most expensive films made by New World Pictures, and despite featuring notable stars, it was not a box office success.

== Plot ==
David Shelby, a prosperous owner of a newly established ski resort nestled beneath a snow-laden mountain, extends an invitation to his ex-wife, Caroline Brace, for the grand opening. This event marks the commencement of both a ski tournament and a figure skating competition.

Among the diverse array of guests are David's spirited mother, Florence; Bruce Scott, a globally renowned ski champion; and two rival figure skaters. Caroline, a magazine reporter, ended her marriage with David due to his controlling nature. Despite the divorce, David invites her to the resort with the hope of rekindling their relationship. His aspiration is to be the "King of the Mountain," and he boldly chose to open the resort in an area deemed uninhabitable due to frequent avalanches.

McDade, a timid bookkeeper, discloses to Florence the challenges David faced, negotiating with land developers and investing his own funds in constructing the resort. While guiding her through the grounds, McDade encounters Nick Thorne, an environmental photographer, who asserts that the resort is environmentally unsafe because of the impending heavy snowfall. However, Nick's warnings are disregarded.

Caroline finds herself drawn to Nick, provoking David's ire and revealing his controlling tendencies. Due to bureaucratic hurdles in the resort's construction, David urges a business partner to fly in and resolve matters despite the snow. A lavish party is hosted on the opening night, with dancing and revelry. Following a confrontation about David's controlling behavior, Caroline meets Nick, and they retreat to Nick's cabin.

As the night progresses, the snowfall intensifies, adding more weight to the mountain. The next morning, the ski and figure skating events commence, and Nick leaves Caroline in the cabin to mitigate the risk of an avalanche using a snow gun. Tragically, the plane carrying David's business partner crashes into the mountain in low visibility, triggering an avalanche. Massive amounts of snow cascade down, obliterating the ski ramp, skating rink, and the resort, causing significant loss of life.

David becomes trapped at the skating rink but manages to free himself. Upon reaching the resort, he discovers McDade and Florence trapped under a staircase in the dining room. A gas leak results in an explosion, causing further injuries and cutting off communication. The town's fire department arrives for rescue, accompanied by a camera crew documenting the destruction.

Bruce narrowly escapes the avalanche but is buried alive. The ski ramp collapses, burying everyone except a boy named Jason and Mark Elliott, a television host, dangling from a partly collapsed ski ramp chair. Caroline witnesses the avalanche from the cabin and rushes to the resort, meeting David. After using dynamite and digging through the snow, they rescue McDade and Florence, the latter on the brink of death due to hypothermia. Caroline revives her with mouth-to-mouth and accompanies her to the hospital.

Bruce, still alive, is found by a search and rescue team in critical condition. David, along with the fire department, goes to the ski ramp to save Jason and Mark. Despite instructions to fall onto a safety trampoline, an electrical shock occurs, electrocuting Mark. As another ambulance arrives, David and Nick load body bags into a truck. The bridge to the hospital is deemed unsafe due to snow, prompting Nick and David to intercept Caroline and Florence.

However, the ambulance skids on ice, crashing into a gorge under the bridge, resulting in the death of the driver and Florence. Arriving moments later, David and Nick rescue Caroline from the edge of the collapsed bridge. Caroline bids farewell to David at the ruined resort. Encountering Nick, they part on good terms, with Nick expressing his appreciation for her as she is.

Caroline shares a final moment with David, who confesses the incident is his fault. Expressing her love, she departs, leaving David to confront the aftermath of his shattered achievements.

== Cast ==
- Rock Hudson as David Shelby
- Mia Farrow as Caroline Brace
- Robert Forster as Nick Thorne
- Jeanette Nolan as Florence Shelby
- Rick Moses as Bruce Scott
- Steve Franken as Henry McDade
- Barry Primus as Mark Elliott
- Cathey Paine as Tina Elliott
- Jerry Douglas as Phil Prentiss
- Antony Carbone as Leo the Coach
- Peggy Browne as Annette Rivers (skater)
- Cindy Perpich (the real ice skating champion) as the ice skating double for the character Annette Rivers
- Pat Egan as Cathy Jordan (skater)
- Joby Baker as TV Director
- X Brands as Marty Brenner
- Cindy Luedke as Susan Maxwell
- John Cathey as Ed the Pilot
- Angelo Lamonea as Bruce's Coach

== Production ==
Roger Corman decided to make the film after enjoying success with another disaster movie, Tidal Wave where he added new footage to a Japanese film. Avalanche was originally budgeted at $2 million and Gavin Lambert, who wrote I Never Promised You a Rose Garden for Corman, was hired to do the script.

The project spent several years in development. It was eventually directed by Corey Allen, who had previously made the film Thunder and Lightning for Corman. Allen's appointment was announced in January 1978. Allen himself rewrote Gavin Lambert's script extensively and received a script credit. (Lambert later claimed Allen "dewrote" the script.)

Rock Hudson signed to star, saying "I've never done a disaster movie." " "I don’t mind calling it a disaster movie," said Corman, "since disaster movies have never failed to make money."

The budget increased to $4 million and was announced at $6.5 million, but Roger Corman cut that amount before production began. Allen was unhappy with the budget cuts and stated that "I don't feel the aims of the film were fulfilled . . . there were heavy pressures on Paul [Rapp, the line producer,] to bring the film in ahead of schedule, and these I feel were detrimental to the film."

The film was shot at the Purgatory Resort north of Durango, Colorado over an eight-week period. The ski scenes were at Purgatory Ski Resort. The avalanche scenes, in which the people are indoors, were filmed at The Lodge at Tamarron, south of Purgatory. At least one scene was filmed in Durango with the Gaslight Movie Theater in the background, at which one of the premier showings of the film was held.

Lewis Teague was second unit director.

== Reception ==
Avalanche was one of the most expensive films ever made by New World Pictures and was not a success at the box office.

The film came out at the same time as New World's Piranha. Corman says that New World thought Avalanche would be more of a success because "it was more mainstream" and had bigger stars; however, Piranha was the bigger hit. In hindsight, Corman says this was because Piranha was "funny and very well directed".

=== Critical response ===
The Los Angeles Times called it "a formula disaster picture" but "its well drawn credible people and swift pacing combine to make it a satisfying diversion" although it "plays more like a TV movie than a theatrical release." Variety said it "combines all the familiar ingredients into a rolling, rushing thriller that will quickly capture its intended audience."

Marc Sigoloff wrote: "Although merely a Roger Corman cheapie, Avalanche possesses more wit and intelligence than the big budgeted Hollywood films."

== Legacy ==
John Wilson, founder of the Golden Raspberry Awards, included Avalanche among the 100 Most Enjoyably Bad Movies Ever Made in The Official Razzie Movie Guide. The film was riffed in the 2017 revival of Mystery Science Theater 3000. Neil Patrick Harris guest-starred as Kinga's online boyfriend and magician.

Some footage was reused in 1979's Meteor.
