= Trackdown (TV series) =

American Western television series (1957–1959)

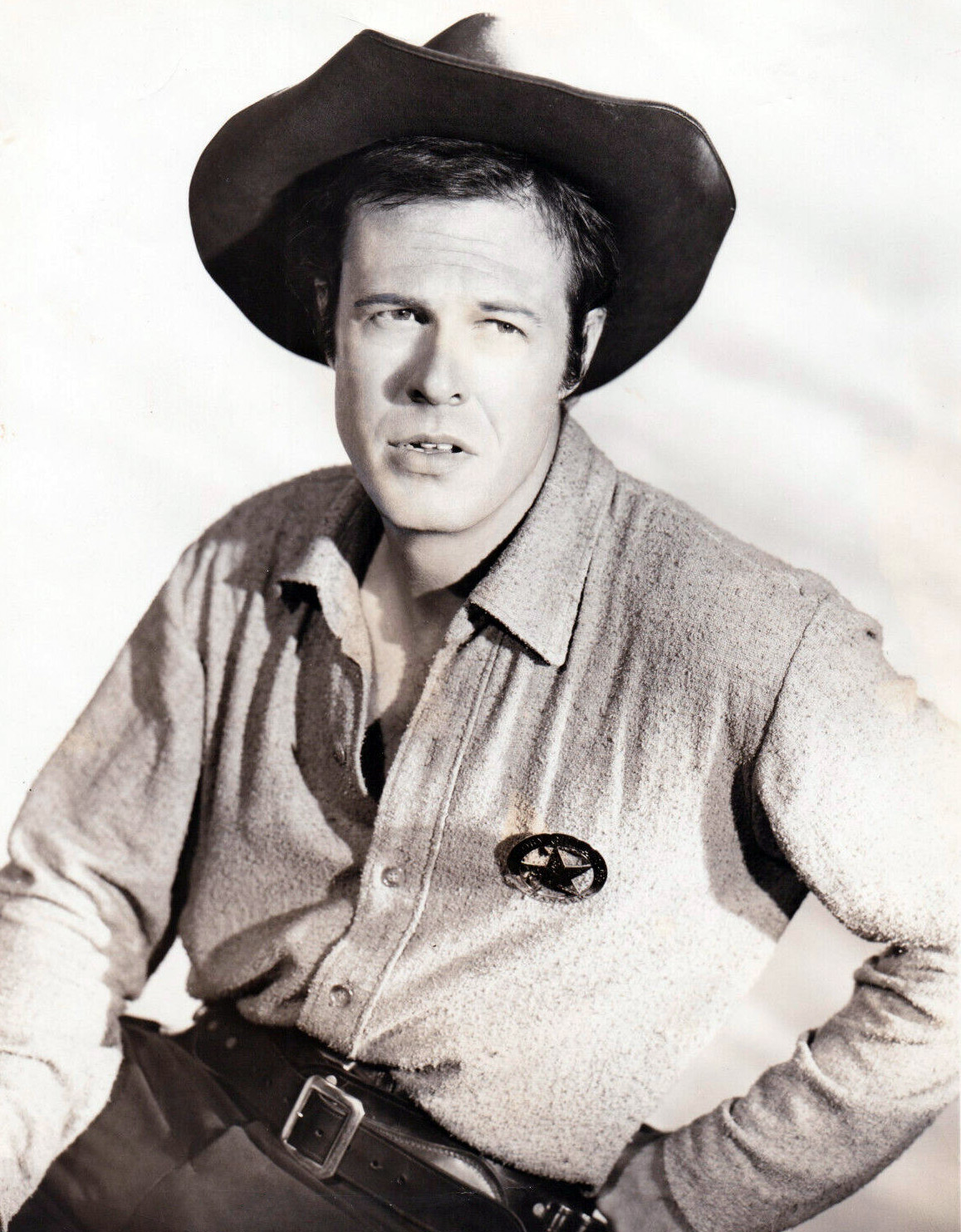
- Robert Culp as Hoby Gilman (1957)
- Genre: Western
- Written by: D.D. Beauchamp; Frank Burt; Fred Freiberger; Norman Jacobs; Christopher Knopf; Sidney Marshall; John McGreevey; John Robinson; Sam Peckinpah
- Directed by: Thomas Carr; Lawrence Dobkin; Richard Donner; Don McDougall; R.G. Springsteen
- Starring: Robert Culp; Ellen Corby; Peter Leeds; Norman Leavitt; James Griffith; Gail Kobe; Addison Richards
- Narrated by: Ed Prentiss
- Theme music composer: William Loose; and John Seely
- Composer: Harry King
- Country of origin: United States
- Original language: English
- No. of seasons: 2
- No. of episodes: 71 plus pilot

Production
- Producer: Vincent M. Fennelly
- Cinematography: Guy Roe
- Running time: 25 minutes
- Production company: Four Star Productions

Original release
- Network: CBS
- Release: October 4, 1957 – September 23, 1959

Related
- Dick Powell's Zane Grey Theater; Wanted: Dead or Alive

Trackdown is an American Western television series starring Robert Culp that aired for two seasons on CBS between 1957 and 1959. The series was produced by Dick Powell's Four Star Television and filmed at the Desilu-Culver Studio. Trackdown was a spin-off of Powell's anthology series, Dick Powell's Zane Grey Theatre. The series was sponsored by the American Tobacco Company via its Lucky Strike brand and Mobil.

== Overview ==
Trackdown stars Robert Culp as Texas Ranger Hoby Gilman. It is set in the 1870s after the American Civil War. In early episodes, stories focused on Gilman going to different Texas towns in pursuit of wanted fugitives. At midseason, the series became set in the town of Porter, Texas. Episodes touched on multiple Western themes and topics, so it was known as "the thinking man's Western".

Gilman is the de facto sheriff in Porter. His friends in the town include Henrietta Porter (portrayed by Ellen Corby). She is the widow of the town's founder and owns The Porter Enterprise newspaper. His other friends included Tenner Smith (played by Peter Leeds), owner of the local saloon, Norman Leavitt as Ralph, his assistant, handyman, and de facto deputy. Occasionally, Gilman's duties as a Texas Ranger took him out of town, where he used his fast gun to "track down" and apprehend wanted criminals throughout the Lone Star State.

The pilot episode, "Badge of Honor", directed by Arthur Hiller, aired on Zane Grey Theatre on May 3, 1957. Gilman, then an ex-Confederate cavalry officer, returns to his Central Texas hometown, called "Crawford", after the war. He finds the town under the ruthless control of a gang led by an ex-Confederate colonel, Boyd Nelson (played by Gary Merrill). The once-courageous town sheriff (portrayed by Tom Tully) is now a drunken shell of a man Gilman had once known, who is afraid to face the outlaws. When a Texas Ranger came to town to arrest Colonel Nelson, he is fatally shot in the back. His Ranger badge falls on the dusty road. Gilman, who previously had served with the Texas Rangers, was weary of the Civil War and did not want to continue as a lawman, but after learning of the Ranger's death, he picks up the badge and finishes the job of bringing Nelson and his gang to justice.

Trackdown carried the endorsement of both the State of Texas and the Texas Rangers, an accolade no other Western television series has received. Some episodes were inspired by the actual files of the Rangers.

== Episodes ==
=== Season 1: 1957–58 ===
No. overall	No. in season	Title	Directed by	Written by	Original release date
1	1	"The Marple Brothers"	Thomas Carr	John McGreevey	October 4, 1957
2	2	"Law in Lampasas"	Thomas Carr	Norman Jacobs	October 11, 1957
3	3	"The San Saba Incident"	Don McDougall	D.D. Beauchamp	October 18, 1957
4	4	"Easton, Texas"	Thomas Carr	John Robinson	October 25, 1957
5	5	"Like Father"	John English	John Robinson	November 1, 1957
6	6	"Sweetwater, Texas"	Don McDougall	Norman Jacobs	November 8, 1957
7	7	"Alpine, Texas"	Thomas Carr	Fred Freiberger	November 15, 1957
8	8	"Self-Defense"	Thomas Carr	John Robinson	November 22, 1957
9	9	"End of an Outlaw"	Thomas Carr	Curtis Kenyon	November 29, 1957
10	10	"Look for the Woman"	Don McDougall	Daniel B. Ullman	December 6, 1957
11	11	"The Town"	Don McDougall	Sam Peckinpah	December 13, 1957
12	12	"Man and Money"	Don McDougall	Daniel B. Ullman	December 27, 1957
13	13	"The Reward"	Don McDougall	Fred Freiberger	January 3, 1958
14	14	"The Farrand Story"	Don McDougall	John Robinson	January 10, 1958
15	15	"Right of Way"	Don McDougall	Don Clark	January 17, 1958
16	16	"The Witness"	Thomas Carr	Christopher Knopf	January 24, 1958
17	17	"The Toll Road"	Don McDougall	Fred Freiberger	January 31, 1958
18	18	"The Young Gun"	Thomas Carr	Daniel B. Ullman	February 7, 1958
19	19	"The Wedding"	Don McDougall	Sidney Marshall	February 14, 1958
20	20	"The Trail"	Don McDougall	John Robinson	February 28, 1958
21	21	"The Bounty Hunter"	Don McDougall	John Robinson	March 7, 1958
22	22	"The Judge"	Don McDougall	John Robinson	March 14, 1958
23	23	"The House"	Thomas Carr	John Robinson	March 21, 1958
24	24	"The Boy"	Thomas Carr	John Robinson	March 28, 1958
25	25	"The Pueblo Kid"	Don McDougall	Frank Bert	April 4, 1958
26	26	"The Winter Boys"	Don McDougall	Frank Bert	April 11, 1958
27	27	"The Mistake"	Don McDougall	John Robinson	April 18, 1958
28	28	"The Deal"	Don McDougall	John Robinson	April 25, 1958
29	29	"The Jailbreak"	Don McDougall	John McGreevey	May 2, 1958
30	30	"The End of the World"	Don McDougall	John Robinson	May 9, 1958
31	31	"The Brothers"	Don McDougall	D.D. Beauchamp	May 16, 1958
32	32	"The Governor"	Don McDougall	Fred Freiberger	May 23, 1958

=== Season 2: 1958–59 ===
No. overall	No. in season	Title	Directed by	Written by	Original release date
33	1	"Killer Take All"	Donald McDougall	Norman Jacob	September 5, 1958
34	2	"Outlaw's Wife"	Donald McDougall	Frank Burt	September 12, 1958
35	3	"Chinese Cowboy"	Donald McDougall	Bob Barbash	September 19, 1958
36	4	"The Set Up"	Thomas Carr	John Robinson	September 26, 1958
37	5	"A Stone for Benny French"	Donald McDougall	Christopher Knopf	October 3, 1958
38	6	"Trapped"	Donald McDougall	D. D. Beauchamp & Mary M. Beauchamp	October 10, 1958
39	7	"Matter of Justice"	Thomas Carr	David Lang	October 17, 1958
40	8	"Tenner Smith"	Donald McDougall	John Robinson	October 24, 1958
41	9	"The Avenger"	Thomas Carr	Fred Freiberger	October 31, 1958
42	10	"The Schoolteacher"	Thomas Carr	Fred Freiberger	November 7, 1958
43	11	"Deadly Decoy"	Donald McDougall	George F. Slavin	November 14, 1958
44	12	"Sunday's Child"	R.G. Springsteen	Maurice Tombragel	November 21, 1958
45	13	"Day of Vengeance"	R.G. Springsteen	Dan Ullman	November 28, 1958
46	14	"Three-Legged Fox"	Donald McDougall	Christopher Knopf	December 5, 1958
47	15	"The Kid"	Thomas Carr	John Robinson	December 12, 1958
48	16	"Guilt"	Donald McDougall	Christopher Knopf	December 19, 1958
49	17	"Every Man a Witness"	Lawrence Dobkin	George F. Slavin	December 26, 1958
50	18	"McCallin's Daughter"	Arthur D. Hilton	Sidney Marshall	January 2, 1959
51	19	"Bad Judgment"	Donald McDougall	D. D. Beauchamp & Mary M. Beauchamp	January 28, 1959
52	20	"Terror"	Donald McDougall	D. D. Beauchamp & Mary M. Beauchamp	February 4, 1959
53	21	"The Feud"	R. G. Springsteen	John McGreevey	February 11, 1959
54	22	"The Samaritan"	R.G. Springsteen	D.D. Beauchamp and Mary M. Beauchamp	February 18, 1959
55	23	"The Gang"	Unknown	Unknown	February 25, 1959
56	24	"The Threat"	Thomas Carr	John Robinson	March 4, 1959
57	25	"Hard Lines"	Donald McDougall	Don Brinkley	March 11, 1959
58	26	"Fear"	Thomas Carr	Christopher Knopf	March 18, 1959
59	27	"Stranger in Town"	Donald McDougall	Dan Ullman	March 25, 1959
60	28	"The Protector"	R. G. Springsteen	Fred Freiberger	April 1, 1959
61	29	"False Witness"	Arthur D. Hilton	Don Brinkley	April 8, 1959
62	30	"The Trick"	R. G. Springsteen	David Lang	April 15, 1959
63	31	"The Eyes of Jerry Kelso"	R. G. Springsteen	John Robinson	April 22, 1959
64	32	"Gift Horse"	Thomas Carr	Christopher Knopf	April 29, 1959
65	33	"The Vote"	Donald McDougall	Fred Freiberger	May 6, 1959
66	34	"The Unwanted"	Donald McDougall	Fred Freiberger	May 13, 1959
67	35	"Toss Up"	Donald McDougall	Fred Freiberger	May 20, 1959
68	36	"Inquest"	Unknown	Unknown	September 2, 1959
69	37	"Back to Crawford"	R. G. Springsteen	Robert Culp	September 9, 1959
70	38	"Blind Alley"	Donald McDougall	S. L. Maita	September 16, 1959
71	39	"Quiet Night in Porter"	Donald McDougall	Donn Mullally	September 23, 1959

== Background and production ==
=== Development ===
All Trackdown episodes were produced by Vincent Fennelly. John Robinson wrote 14 segments, including the pilot. Richard Donner was one of the directors. Sam Peckinpah wrote one episode, "The Town", about a cowardly community afraid to resist the clutches of an outlaw gang, but he did not direct any Trackdown episodes.

Robert Culp wrote one episode, titled "Back to Crawford", which features his then-wife, Nancy Asch-Culp. This episode was directly related to the first regular series episode, "The Marple Brothers", as Nancy portrayed a former childhood friend of Hoby's, Merrilee Quintana, with whom Hoby was once in love, who was out to kill his sister Norah as revenge for his killing her young husband in the line of duty, and who was one of the evil Marple Brothers he encountered in episode one. Gilman's sister was played by actress Peggy Webber, reprising her role from the series pilot.

In an interview, Robert Culp stated that Trackdown was conceived by its creators as "the Western Dragnet". The pilot of the series was written by John Robinson, who according to Culp in that same interview, was partly responsible for the creation of Dragnet.

The series narrator was character actor Ed Prentiss.

=== Guest stars ===
- Nick Adams
- Chris Alcaide
- Fred Aldrich
- John Anderson
- Robert Anderson
- Robert Armstrong
- Phyllis Avery
- Trevor Bardette
- Claudia Barrett
- James Best
- Paul Birch
- Whit Bissell
- George Brenlin
- Paul Brinegar
- Walter Brooke
- Edgar Buchanan
- King Calder
- Ahna Capri
- James Chandler
- Sidney Clute
- James Coburn
- Russ Conway
- Walter Coy
- Johnny Crawford
- Dennis Cross
- Richard Devon
- Lawrence Dobkin
- James Drury
- Don Durant
- Scott Forbes
- Robert Foulk
- Beverly Garland
- Dabbs Greer
- Richard Hale
- Rodolfo Hoyos Jr.
- Richard Jaeckel
- Vivi Janiss
- Ray Jones
- Robert Karnes
- DeForest Kelley
- Jess Kirkpatrick
- Michael Landon
- Nolan Leary
- Forrest Lewis
- Strother Martin
- Carole Mathews
- Ken Mayer
- Rod McGaughy
- Steve McQueen
- Joseph Mell
- Rita Moreno
- Neyle Morrow
- Vic Morrow
- James Murdock
- James Nolan
- Warren Oates
- Susan Oliver
- James Parnell
- Joseph V. Perry
- Mike Ragan
- Richard Reeves
- Paul Richards
- Pernell Roberts
- Gloria Saunders
- Karen Sharpe
- George Sowards
- Harold J. Stone
- William Talman
- Ray Teal
- Robert Tetrick
- Russell Thorson
- Jack Tornek
- Lee Van Cleef
- Alan Wells
- Stuart Whitman
- Jean Willes
- Chill Wills

== Release ==
=== Syndication ===
From 2016 to 2020, episodes of Trackdown aired Saturday mornings on MeTV. Trackdown returned to broadcast television on H&I beginning in October 2025.

== Cultural references ==
The episode "The End of the World" received attention by certain media after Donald Trump was elected president of the United States in 2016, nearly 60 years after the episode first aired. In the episode, a rabble-rousing doomsayer named Walter Trump (played by Lawrence Dobkin) comes to town. He scares the townsfolk with talk of an impending disaster and claims to be the only person who can save them – by building a wall. He also threatens to sue Hoby when accused of dishonesty. By the end of the episode, he is arrested as a conman and fraud. The coincidental similarity to Donald Trump's name and proposed border wall was noted.

A Vanity Fair author wrote, "Of all the books and movies that presaged the rise of our reality-TV President... none are so eerily on the nose as this once-obscure, 1958 episode of Trackdown in which a demagogue named Trump attempts to convince a town that only he can save its citizens... by building a wall." The Wrap asked, "Want to talk about a weird coincidence?.... Some may call this episode titled 'The End of the World' the ultimate illustration of life imitating art, considering the episode aired May 9, 1958... it is pretty amusing, especially when the TV character threatens, 'Be careful, son. I can sue you.'" The San Francisco Chronicle stated, "The character's speech is so similar to the President-elect's, it almost seems as if Donald Trump borrowed some catchphrases from Walter Trump."

== Critical response ==
A review in the trade publication Variety described Trackdown as "a moderately good western half-hour telefilm with a moderately good star performer". The review complimented characterizations but said the plot "was as loaded with holes as the villains were".
