= Charlie X =

- Star Trek: The Original Series episode
- Episode no.: Season 1 Episode 2
- Directed by: Lawrence Dobkin
- Story by: Gene Roddenberry
- Teleplay by: D. C. Fontana
- Cinematography by: Jerry Finnerman
- Production code: 8
- Original air date: September 15, 1966

Guest appearances
- Robert Walker – Charlie Evans; Charles J. Stewart – Captain Ramart; Dallas Mitchell – Tom Nellis; Don Eitner – Navigator; Patricia McNulty – Tina Lawton; John Bellah – Crewman I; Garland Thompson – Crewman II; Abraham Sofaer – The Thasian; Bob Herron – Sam; Gene Roddenberry – Enterprise Chef (voice) (uncredited)

Episode chronology
← Previous "The Man Trap"	Next → "Where No Man Has Gone Before"
- Star Trek: The Original Series season 1

"Charlie X" is the second broadcast episode of the first season of the American science fiction television series Star Trek. Written by D. C. Fontana from a story by Gene Roddenberry, and directed by Lawrence Dobkin, it first aired on September 15, 1966.

In the episode, the Enterprise picks up an unstable 17-year-old boy who spent 14 years alone on a deserted planet and lacks the training and restraint to handle his superhuman mental powers wisely.

== Plot ==
The USS Enterprise meets the merchant vessel Antares to take charge of Charlie Evans, the sole survivor of a transport ship that crashed on the planet Thasus. For fourteen years, 17-year-old Charlie grew up there alone, stranded in the wreckage, learning how to talk from the ship's computer systems, which remained intact. Charlie is to be transported to his nearest relatives on the colony Alpha V. Crew members aboard Antares speak praises about Charlie, but seem pleased to see him removed from their ship. He tells Dr. McCoy the crew of Antares did not like him very much, and that all he wants is for people to like him.

Despite his eagerness to please, Charlie proves to be more than a little awkward, since his lack of upbringing has left him with no knowledge of social norms or the need to control his emotions. He latches on to Captain Kirk as a father figure and develops an infatuation with Yeoman Janice Rand. He demonstrates extraordinary powers of telepathy and matter transmutation, though the crew initially fails to recognize the cause. Charlie meets Rand in the recreation room, where Mr. Spock plays a Vulcan lyrette and Lt. Uhura suddenly starts singing. Charlie grows annoyed with being teased in Uhura's song, as well as with Rand paying more attention to the song than to him. He causes Uhura to temporarily lose her voice and Spock's instrument to malfunction.

When the Antares is nearly out of sensor range, it transmits a message to the Enterprise. The message is cut off before it can convey a warning. Scanners show the Antares has been reduced to debris; Charlie then comments that the ship "wasn't well constructed".

Kirk tries to teach Charlie martial arts. Sam, Kirk's training partner, laughs at one of Charlie's falls, and Charlie makes him "vanish". Shocked, Kirk calls for security guards to escort Charlie to his quarters. Charlie makes all phasers on the ship disappear, but ultimately yields to Kirk's order that he return to his quarters. Records show that Charlie's abilities are the same as those of Thasians, but the medical examination McCoy conducted when Charlie came on board confirmed that he is human. Charlie admits he used his powers to remove a vital component of the Antares warp core, causing the ship to explode. Frustrated at the adversarial turn in his relationship with the crew, Charlie breaks out of his quarters and begins to use his powers on the crew - changing their physical forms, silencing them, or freezing them, according to his whim. When Rand resists his romantic advances and slaps him, he makes her "disappear." When Kirk demands to know if Rand is dead or alive, Charlie refuses to tell him.

Realizing Charlie's powers are too great to be controlled, Kirk opts to divert from Alpha V so as to at least keep Charlie away from a civilized world, where he would wreak havoc. Charlie discovers Kirk's plans, and takes control of the Enterprise. Speculating that controlling the Enterprise may overstretch Charlie's power, Kirk orders all of the ship's systems to be activated and attacks Charlie. Though his hypothesis proves incorrect, it distracts Charlie from fleeing a Thasian ship that had been pursuing them.

The ship approaches and restores the Enterprise and its crew to their proper forms - although they admit they cannot restore the Antares. The Thasian commander says that his race gave Charlie his powers so he could survive on their world, but these powers (which they cannot remove from him) make him too dangerous to live among humans. Charlie begs Kirk not to let the aliens have him, since the Thasians lack any physical form or capacity for love. However, the Thasians reject Kirk's argument that Charlie belongs with his own kind. With a final echoing wail of "I wanna stay!" Charlie is transported away and Yeoman Rand begins crying for him.

== Production history ==
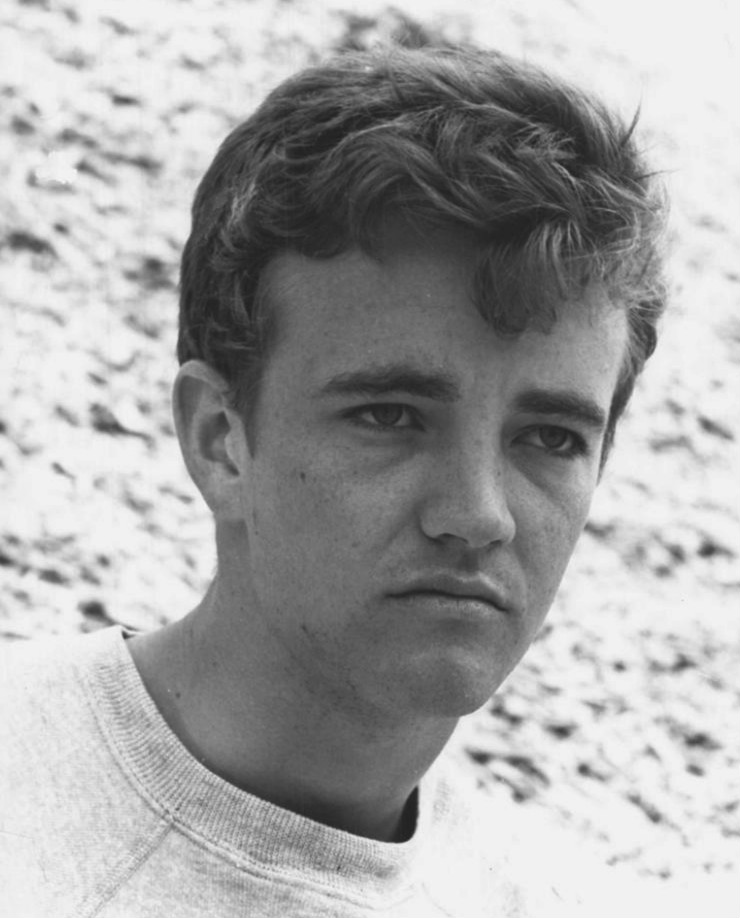
Robert Walker Jr. (photo from the television series Route 66) portrayed Charlie Evans

The premise for this episode formed part of Gene Roddenberry's original March 1964 pitch for Star Trek, under the name "The Day Charlie Became God". When the series entered production, Roddenberry assigned it to D. C. Fontana to dramatize.

For a while during production, the episode was known as "Charlie's Law"; a name which survived in the James Blish adaptation of the episode for Bantam Books. In a scene in the script which did not air, Charlie's Law is stated as "You'd better be nice to Charlie ... or else."

Gene Roddenberry made an uncredited audio cameo as the cook (or mess officer) who exclaims that the turkey-shaped meatloaf in the galley ovens has turned into real turkeys. This was his only speaking role in Star Trek: The Original Series.

== Reception ==
Zack Handlen of The A.V. Club gave the episode a "B" rating. Handlen marked the episode down for its poor treatment of Yeoman Janice Rand and use of the "god-child" cliché, but praised more "disturbing" elements of the episode, such as Charlie's pranks and his eventual fate.

In 2016, Syfy ranked guest star Robert Walker's performance as Charlie as the 6th best guest star on the original series and Uhura's singing as the character's seventh best moment in Star Trek.

In 2024 Hollywood.com ranked "Charlie X" at number 13 out of the 79 original series episodes, calling it "bold, primary-colored fantasia of ‘60s pop art".

== See also ==
- "It's a Good Life", a short story about a child with godlike powers
  - "It's a Good Life (The Twilight Zone)", an episode of The Twilight Zone (1959 TV series) adapted from the story
