= The Gambler Wore a Gun =

1961 film by Edward L. Cahn

- Theatrical release poster
- Directed by: Edward L. Cahn
- Written by: Owen Harris
- Based on: story by L.L. Foreman
- Produced by: Robert E. Kent
- Starring: Jim Davis; Merry Anders; Addison Richards
- Cinematography: Floyd Crosby
- Edited by: Kenneth G. Crane
- Music by: Paul Sawtell; Bert Shefter
- Production company: Zenith Pictures
- Distributed by: United Artists
- Release date: May 5, 1961 (United States)
- Running time: 67 minutes
- Country: United States
- Language: English

The Gambler Wore a Gun is a 1961 Western film. The film is an uncredited remake of about five different B-westerns of the 1930s and 1940s. Some plot elements are also taken from 1954 western The Lone Gun, which starred George Montgomery.

== Plot ==
Case Silverhorn (Jim Davis), a professional gambler, wants to retire from the gambling life and purchases a ranch through the mail. On the way there he saves the local Sheriff's life, who got into an ambush. The ambush did leave one man dead: the man Silverhorn purchased the ranch from is murdered before the title-deed can be recorded. Neither the Sheriff, nor the seller's children, Jud (Don Dorrell) and Sharon Donovan (Merry Anders) have any knowledge of the transaction and will not vacate the ranch. Taking a job at the local saloon, Case discovers that rustlers, unknown to the Donovans, are using the ranch-lands to hide the stolen cattle. Jud learns of the operation and is killed by the gang, and Case is framed for the murder.

== Cast ==
- Jim Davis as Case Silverthorne (as James Davis)
- Merry Anders as Sharon Donovan
- Mark Allen as Marshal Dex Harwood
- Addison Richards as Doc Devlin
- Robert Anderson as Tray Larkin
- Don Dorrell as Jud Donovan
- Charles Cane as Kelly Barnum
- Keith Richards as Het Larkin
- John Craig as Rebe Larkin
- Joe McGuinn as Hastings (as Joe McQuinn)
- Morgan Shaan as Thompson
- Boyd "Red" Morgan as Luke
- Boyd Stockman as Dave
- Jack Kenney as Bartender
- Eden Hartford as Woman
- Brad Trumbull as Deputy

== See also ==
- List of American films of 1961
