= Patricia McNulty =

American actress (1942–2023)

- McNulty in Star Trek, 1966
- Born: Maureen Patricia McNulty; October 16, 1942; Los Angeles, California, U.S.
- Died: September 4, 2023 (aged 80)
- Spouse: Don Dorrell

Maureen Patricia McNulty (October 16, 1942 – September 4, 2023) was an American actress known for her appearances in 1960s television series.

McNulty had a recurring role in the sitcom television series My Three Sons with Fred MacMurray (1961–1967) and also appeared in Hazel, The Many Loves of Dobie Gillis, and Mr. Novak (Season 1, episode 10 as Mrs Rita Donzey). She also played Yeoman Tina Lawton in an episode of the original Star Trek series ("Charlie X", 1966). She was the wife of actor, Don Dorrell.

McNulty died on September 4, 2023, at the age of 80.

== Partial filmography ==
- Tammy Tell Me True (1961) - Joan
- The House of God (1984) - Computer Technician (final film role)

== Television ==
Year	Title	Role	Notes
1966	Star Trek: The Original Series	Tina Lawton	S1:E2, "Charlie X"
