= Young Dan'l Boone =

- Genre: Adventure; Drama
- Created by: Ernie Frankel
- Directed by: Earl Bellamy
- Starring: Rick Moses; Devon Ericson; Ji-Tu Cumbuka; John Joseph Thomas; Eloy Casados
- Opening theme: Earle Hagen
- Ending theme: Earle Hagen
- Country of origin: United States
- Original language: English
- No. of seasons: 1
- No. of episodes: 8 (4 unaired)

Production
- Executive producer: Ernie Frankel
- Production locations: Smoky Mountains, Tennessee
- Running time: 60 minutes
- Production companies: Frankel Productions; 20th Century Fox Television

Original release
- Network: CBS
- Release: 12 September – 4 October 1977

Young Dan'l Boone is an American adventure drama series that was broadcast on CBS for four episodes from September 12 to October 4, 1977. The series follows famed American frontiersman Daniel Boone on his adventures before his marriage. His three companions are Peter Dawes, a 12-year-old English boy, a runaway slave named Hawk, and a Cherokee named Tsiskwa. Meanwhile, Rebecca Bryan waits at home hoping she and Daniel will marry someday.

The 1960s Daniel Boone series starring Fess Parker had been a commercial success, but was often mocked for its historical inaccuracies. The makers of Young Dan'l Boone sought to be more realistic. The series was shot on location in the Appalachian Mountains near where the real Daniel Boone grew up. The plots were based more on actual events.

== Cast ==
- Daniel Boone - Rick Moses
- Rebecca Bryan - Devon Ericson
- Hawk - Ji-Tu Cumbuka
- Peter Dawes - John Joseph Thomas
- Tsiskwa - Eloy Casados

== Episodes ==
Details and descriptions taken from Radio Times listings:

No.	Title	Directed by	Written by	Original release date
1	"The Trail Blazer"	Earl Bellamy	David P. Harmon	September 12, 1977
Dan'l finds himself in grave danger from a British spy working with the French militia to prevent him blazing a trail through forbidden territory.
2	"The Pirate"	Ernie Pintoff	Albert Aley	September 19, 1977
Dan'l and his young friend Peter set off to deliver some furs, but run into trouble when the furs are stolen by a gang led by a renegade British ex-Army Sergeant.
3	"The Salt Licks"	Don McDougall	Robert I. Holt	September 26, 1977
Dan'l and Hawk run foul of hostile Shawnee Indians whilst helping a group of settlers to work a salt mine.
4	"The Game"	Arthur Marks	Oliver Crawford	October 4, 1977 (Note: October 4, 1977 was the series' "special night", as its usual Monday night time slot on October 3 was preempted for the Elvis in Concert special. It turned out to be its final telecast on CBS.)
Three renegade Cherokee Indians accidentally kill a young squaw and blame two young white settlers. Dan'l, Hawk and Peter get involved in a dangerous ritual to try to prove the lads' innocence.
5	"The Slaver"	Don McDougall, Arthur Marks	Robert I. Holt	August 25, 1978 (UK) (UNAIRED IN US)
Dan'l, Hawk and Peter have to take drastic action against a so-called preacher when they find out that he and his party are in fact slavers, out to capture the local Indians.
6	"The Haunted Mountain"	Corey Allen	Albert Aley	September 22, 1978 (UK) (UNAIRED IN US)
Dan'l agrees to act as guide for three men seeking a lost gold shipment, only to find that two of them are agents for the French.
7	"The Plague"	Arthur Marks	Margaret Armen, Alf Harris	August 18, 1978 (UK) (UNAIRED IN US)
When a settler unwittingly kills a friendly Indian, Dan'l Boone agrees to undergo the traditional Indian trial of justice in his place.
8	"The Warrior"	Don McDougall	Mann Rubin	September 8, 1978 (UK) (UNAIRED IN US)
Dan'l and Peter foil an attack by Creek warrior Indians on Tsiskwa's Cherokee village, with the help of an old Indian, Big Fox.

== Guest stars ==
Guest stars included Cal Bellini (as Red Eagle), Jeremy Brett (as Langford), Kurt Kasznar (as Emil Van Diben), Clive Revill (as Teague), Len Birman (as Duval), Paul Shenar (as Hammond) and Richard Kiel (as Grimm). Several actors from the nearby University of Tennessee theater department played recurring Native Americans.
