= Westerns on television =

Television genre based on the American Old West

Television Westerns are programs with settings in the later half of the 19th century in the American Old West, Western Canada and Mexico during the period from about 1860 to the end of the so-called "Indian Wars". More recent entries in the Western genre have used the neo-Western subgenre, placing events in the modern day, or the space Western subgenre, but still draw inspiration from the outlaw attitudes prevalent in traditional Western productions.

When television became popular in the late 1940s and 1950s, Westerns quickly became an audience favorite, with 30 such shows airing at prime time by 1959. Traditional Westerns faded in popularity in the late 1960s, while new shows fused Western elements with other types of shows, such as family drama, mystery thrillers, and crime drama. In the 1990s and 2000s, slickly packaged made-for-TV movie Westerns were introduced.

== History ==
=== Radio and film antecedents ===
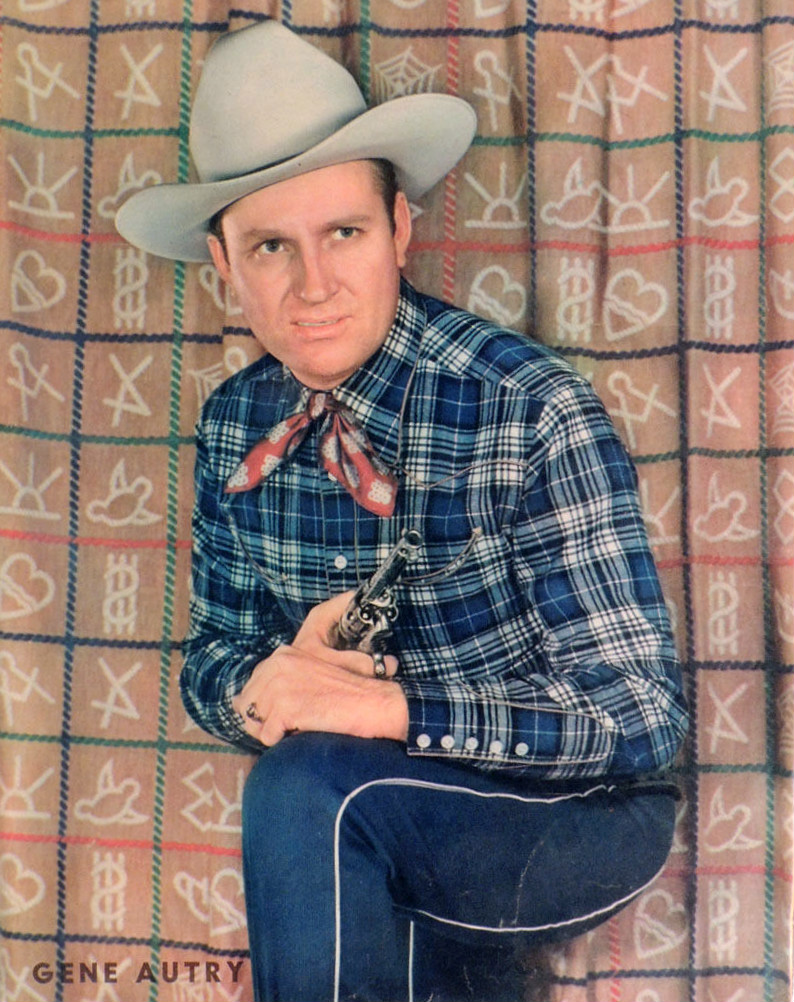
Gene Autry

The Saturday Afternoon Matinee on the radio were a pre-television phenomenon in the US which often featured Western series. Film Westerns turned John Wayne, Ken Maynard, Audie Murphy, Tom Mix, and Johnny Mack Brown into major idols of a young audience, plus "singing cowboys" such as Gene Autry, Roy Rogers and Dale Evans, Dick Foran, Rex Allen, Tex Ritter, Ken Curtis, and Bob Steele. Each cowboy had a co-starring horse such as Rogers' Golden Palomino, Trigger, who became a star in his own right.

Other B-movie series were Lash LaRue and the Durango Kid. Herbert Jeffreys, as Bob Blake with his horse Stardust, appeared in a number of movies made for African American audiences in the days of segregated movie theaters. Bill Pickett, an African-American rodeo performer, also appeared in early Western films for the same audience.

=== 1940s through early 1960s ===
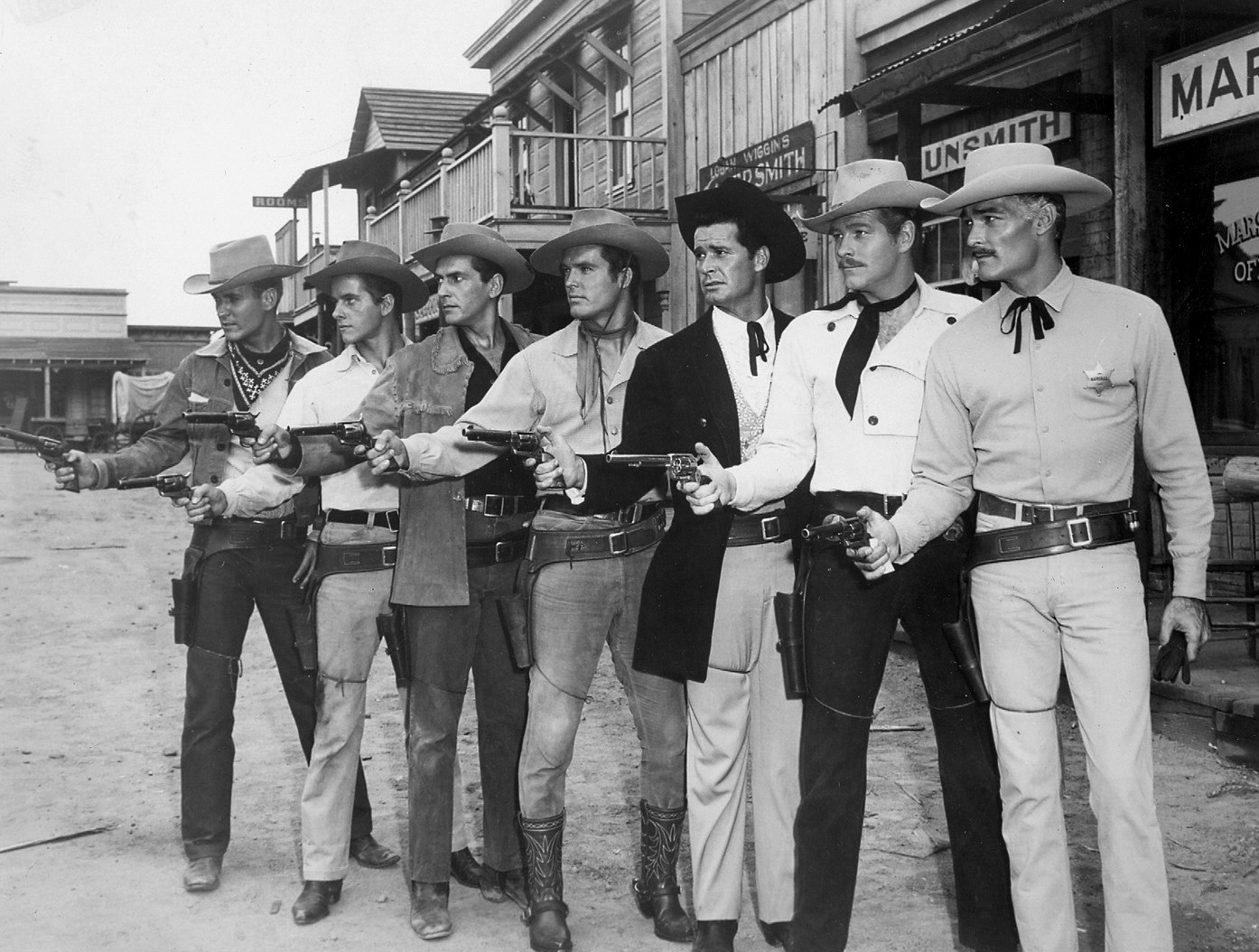
1959 series leads Will Hutchins (Sugarfoot), Peter Brown (Lawman), Jack Kelly (Maverick), Ty Hardin (Bronco), James Garner (Maverick), Wayde Preston (Colt .45), and John Russell (Lawman)

When the popularity of television exploded in the late 1940s and 1950s, Westerns quickly became a staple of small-screen entertainment. The first, on June 24, 1949, was the Hopalong Cassidy show, at first edited from the 66 films made by William Boyd. Many B-movie Westerns were aired on TV as time fillers, while a number of long-running TV Westerns became classics in their own right. The earliest TV Westerns were written primarily for a children's audience; it was not until the near-concurrent debuts of The Life and Legend of Wyatt Earp and the TV version of Gunsmoke in 1955 that adult Westerns appeared on television, and the genre became enormously popular. Notable TV Westerns include The Cisco Kid with Duncan Renaldo, The Lone Ranger with Clayton Moore, The Gene Autry Show with Gene Autry, Gunsmoke with James Arness, Cheyenne with Clint Walker, Have Gun – Will Travel with Richard Boone, Sugarfoot with Will Hutchins, Wagon Train with Ward Bond and Robert Horton, Maverick with James Garner and Jack Kelly, Trackdown with Robert Culp, Wanted Dead or Alive with Steve McQueen, Bronco with Ty Hardin, Bat Masterson with Gene Barry, The Rifleman with Chuck Connors, Rawhide with Eric Fleming and Clint Eastwood, Bonanza with Pernell Roberts and Dan Blocker, Laramie, The Virginian with James Drury and Doug McClure, The Big Valley with Barbara Stanwyck, The High Chaparral, and many others.

By 1959, four years after the boom in TV Westerns began, thirty such shows were on television during prime time; none had been canceled that season, while 14 new ones had appeared. In one week in March 1959, eight of the top ten shows were Westerns, and an estimated $125 million in toys based on TV Westerns would be sold that year. Many were "four-wall Westerns", filmed indoors in three days or less with scripts of poor quality, and the genre's enormous popularity mystified even its creators; TIME quoted one of the about 100 writers for TV Westerns as wondering "I don't get it. Why do people want to spend so much time staring at the wrong end of a horse?" Foreign audiences also enjoyed Westerns. Bonanza was the most popular American television export, watched by 400 million people in 82 countries. In many countries new to the technology, audiences happily watched educational television until exposed to Westerns, then wanted nothing else. A Canadian who helped establish television in Ghana warned "If you really want to use television to teach people about the world, then you must not import cowboy shows".

The glut of Western series on television was a target of Newton Minow in his speech "Television and the Public Interest," noting that while he was a fan of Westerns, there were too many of them on the air at the time, those that were on the air were too frequently emphasizing violence and juvenile plots, and it contributed to the lack of quality television offerings (such as news, live sports, documentaries and high cultural programs) available in 1960, which he famously described as a "vast wasteland."

A horse cost up to $100 a day, compared to $22.05 for an extra; increasing production costs caused most action half-hour series vanishing in the early 1960s to be replaced by hour long television shows, increasingly in color. Two unusual Western series of this era are Zorro, set in early California under Spanish rule, and the British/Australian Western Whiplash set in 1850/60's Australia with four scripts by Gene Roddenberry.

==== Examples ====
- The Lone Ranger was an American long-running early radio and television show created by George W. Trendle and developed by writer Fran Striker. The titular character is a masked Texas Ranger in the American Old West, who gallops about righting injustices, usually with the aid of a clever and laconic Native American companion named Tonto, and his horse Silver.

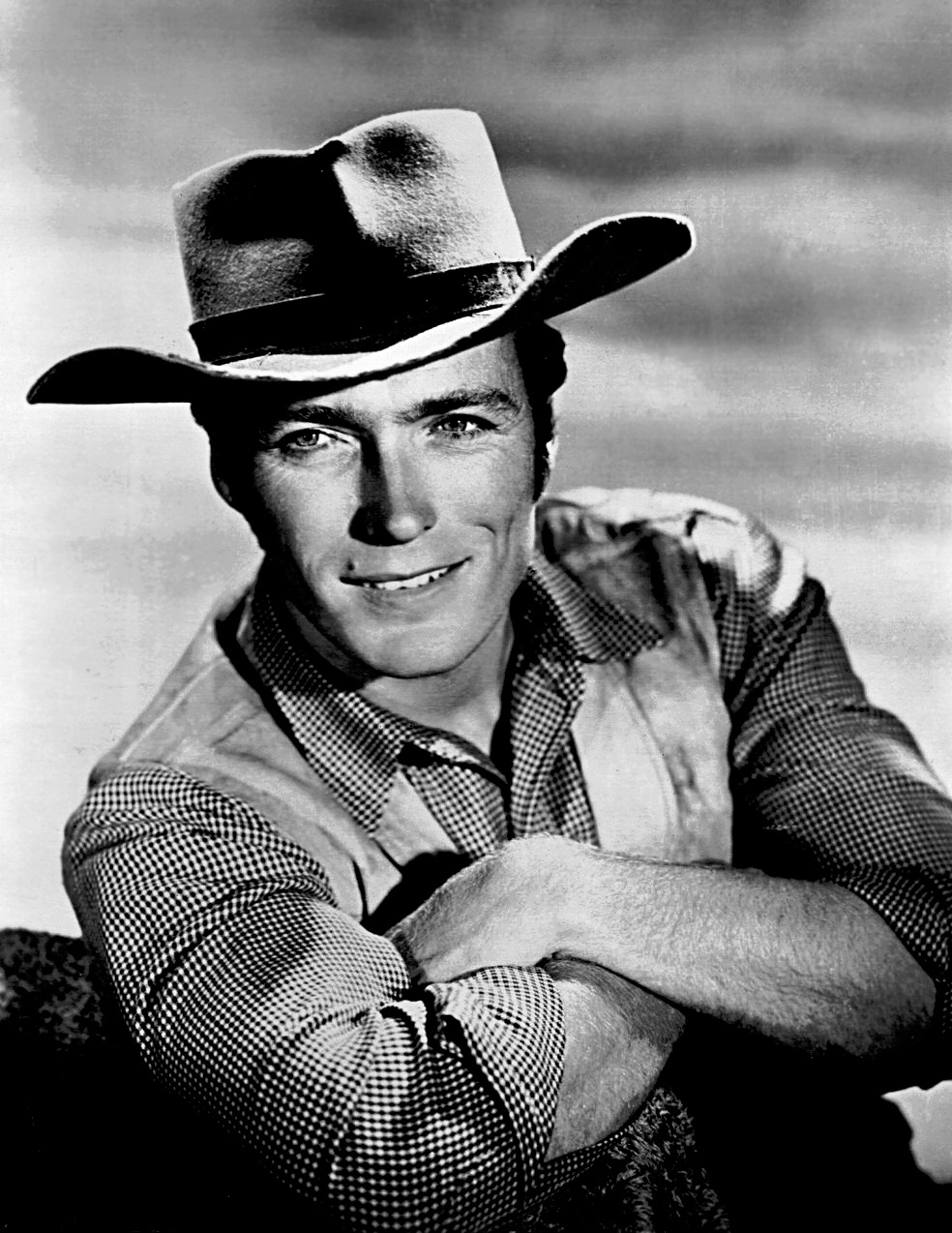
Clint Eastwood in Rawhide

- The Roy Rogers Show was a black and white American television series that ran for six seasons from December 30, 1951, to June 9, 1957, on NBC, with a total of 100 episodes. The series starred Roy Rogers, Pat Brady, and Dale Evans. The show started airing in France on March 5, 1962. The series was nominated for an Emmy Award in 1955 for Best Western or Adventure Series
- Rawhide was a television Western series which aired on the American network CBS from 1959 to 1966. It starred Eric Fleming and launched the career of Clint Eastwood. Its premiere episode reached the top 20 in the Nielsen ratings. Rawhide was the fourth longest-running American TV Western, beaten only by nine years of The Virginian and Wagon Train, 14 years of Bonanza, and 20 years of Gunsmoke. The typical Rawhide story involved drovers who would meet people on the trail and get drawn into solving whatever problem they presented or were confronting.

=== Late 1960s through 1980s ===
Traditional Westerns began to disappear from television in the late 1960s and early 1970s as color television became ubiquitous. With the exception of the short-lived The Cowboys in 1974, 1968 was the last season any new traditional Westerns debuted on television; by 1969, after pressure from parental advocacy groups who claimed Westerns were too violent for television, all three of the major networks ceased airing new Western series. Demographic pressures and overall burnout from the format may have also been a factor as viewers became bored and disinterested with the glut of Westerns on the air at the time. By 1971, production companies had acknowledged that "the Western idea is out." The two last traditional Westerns, Death Valley Days and Gunsmoke, ended their runs in 1975.

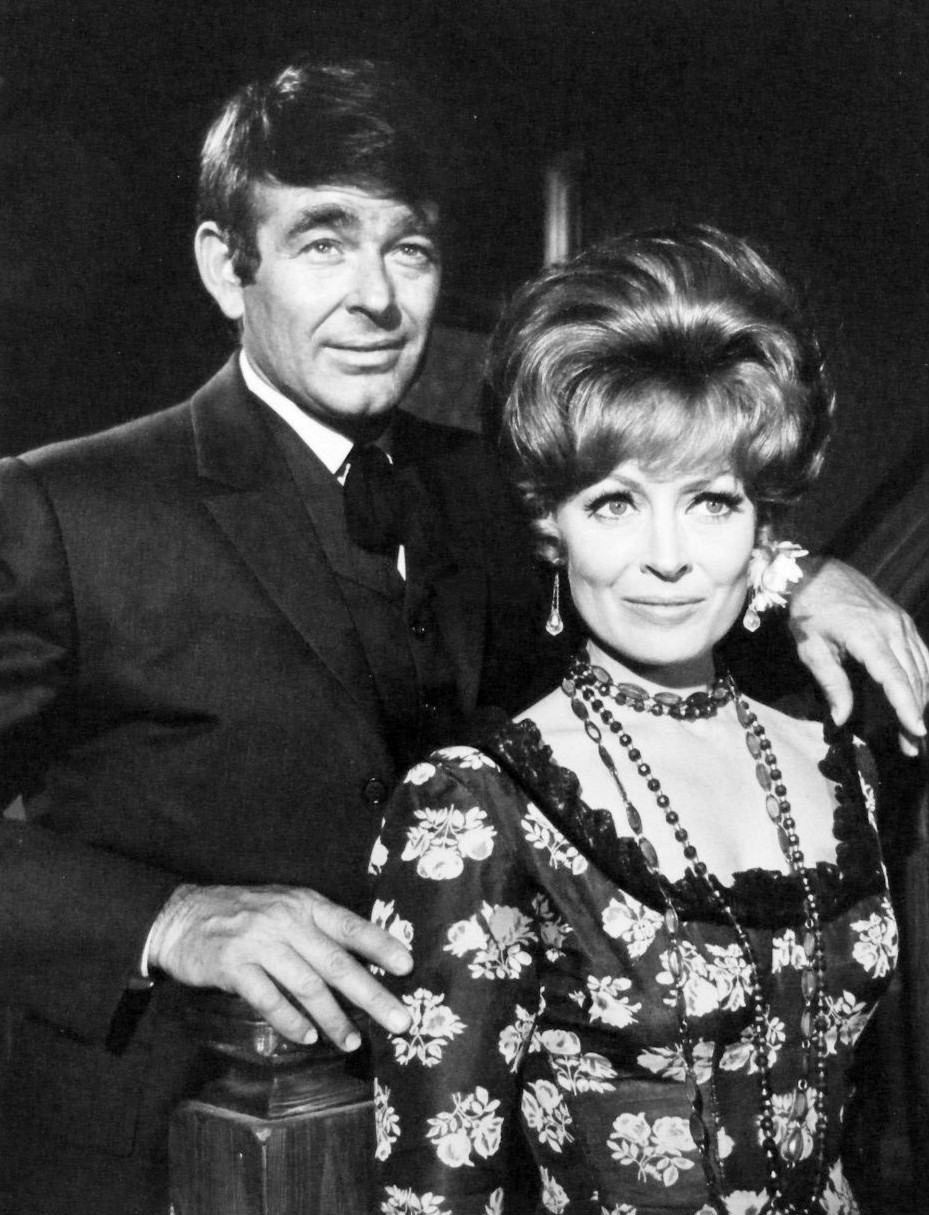
Stuart Whitman and Victoria Shaw in Cimarron Strip (1967)

While the traditional Westerns mostly died out in the late 1960s, more modernized Westerns, incorporating story concepts from outside the traditional genre, began appearing on television shortly thereafter. A number of the new shows downplayed the traditional violent elements of Westerns, for example by having the main characters go unarmed and/or seek to avoid conflicts, or by emphasizing fantasy, comedy or family themes. The Wild Wild West, which ran from 1965 to 1969, combined Westerns with science fiction (what later would be termed steampunk) and an espionage-thriller format in the spirit of the recently popularized James Bond franchise. F Troop was a satirical sitcom that made fun of the genre. The limited-run McCloud, which premiered in 1970, was essentially a fusion of the sheriff-oriented Western with the modern big-city crime drama. Its companion series Hec Ramsey was a lighthearted who-dunnit mystery series set in the late Western era, starring Richard Boone (previously of the traditional Western Have Gun, Will Travel; Boone described the characters in each series as very similar) as a retired gunfighter turned detective. Cimarron Strip, a lavish 90-minute 1967 series starring Stuart Whitman as a U.S. Marshal, was canceled after a single season primarily because of its unprecedented expense. Nichols featured former Maverick star James Garner as a motorcycle-riding, unarmed peacemaker in a late-era Western setting. The low-budget sitcom Dusty's Trail was an Old West adaptation of Gilligan's Island, complete with the star of the earlier show, Bob Denver. Little House on the Prairie was set on the frontier in the time period of the Western, but was essentially a family drama. Kung Fu was in the tradition of the itinerant gunfighter Westerns, but the main character was a Shaolin monk, the son of an American father and a Chinese mother, who fought only with his formidable martial art skill. Bruce Lee had proposed a series with a similar concept, The Warrior, but studios rejected it; it would eventually be produced over 40 years after Lee's death. The Life and Times of Grizzly Adams was a family adventure show about a gentle mountain man with an uncanny connection to wildlife who helps others who visit his wilderness refuge. Dallas took the soap opera genre and put it into a Western setting, with established TV Western star Jim Davis as patriarch Jock Ewing.

==== Examples ====
- Alias Smith and Jones, which aired on ABC from January 1971 to January 1973, was inspired by the success of the movie Butch Cassidy and the Sundance Kid. The main characters are two wanted bank robbers on the run under false identities, who now wish to reform, and have been secretly promised a pardon by the governor on the condition that they stay out of trouble until some unspecified future time. They must deal with people and situations they encounter while on the run, without giving away their true identities or committing any further criminal acts. Like Butch Cassidy, the series is a Western with buddy film and comedy-drama elements.
- Little House on the Prairie (retitled Little House: A New Beginning in 1982) aired on NBC from September 11, 1974, to March 21, 1983, based on the "Little House" series of children's books by Laura Ingalls Wilder. The long-running series told the story of a farm family settling on the frontier in Minnesota during the 1870s and 1880s.
- The Young Riders aired on ABC from September 20, 1989, to July 23, 1992, for three seasons. The show followed a group of riders for the fabled Pony Express which operated 1860–1861.

=== 1990s and 2000s ===
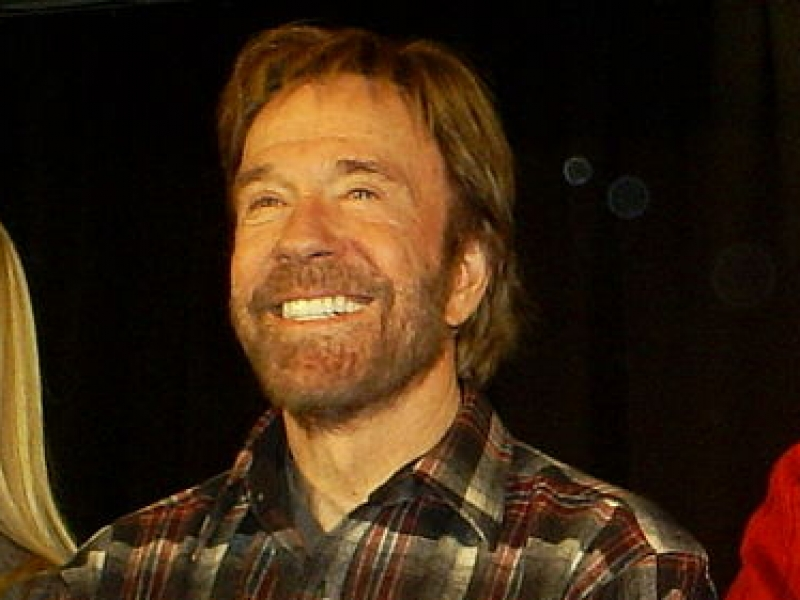
Chuck Norris starred in the 1990s neo-Western Walker, Texas Ranger, which ran for eight seasons.

The 1990s saw the networks filming Western movies on their own. These include Louis L'Amour's Conagher starring Sam Elliott and Katharine Ross, Tony Hillerman's The Dark Wind, The Last Outlaw, The Jack Bull, The Cisco Kid, The Cherokee Kid, and the TV series Lonesome Dove.

Zorro was remade with Duncan Regehr for The Family Channel filmed in Madrid, Spain.

Dr. Quinn, Medicine Woman was an American Western/dramatic television series created by Beth Sullivan. It ran on CBS for six seasons, from January 1, 1993, to May 16, 1998, and won multiple Emmy awards.

Walker, Texas Ranger was a long-running Western/crime drama series, set in the modern era, in the United States, that starred and later was produced by Chuck Norris. It ran on CBS for nine seasons, from April 21, 1993, to May 19, 2001. For most of their time on air, Dr. Quinn and Walker aired on the same Saturday night lineup. Walker would receive a reboot in 2021, with a prequel, Walker: Independence, following in 2022.

In the 1993–1994 season, the Fox network aired a science fiction Western called The Adventures of Brisco County, Jr., which lasted for only 27 episodes. In the fall of 1995, the UPN network aired its own science fiction Western, Legend, which ended after 12 episodes.

Western TV shows from the 2000s included the Zorro-inspired, syndicated Queen of Swords, starring Tessie Santiago and filmed in Almeria, Spain; Louis L'Amour's Crossfire Trail starring Tom Selleck; Monte Walsh; and Hillerman's Coyote Waits and A Thief of Time. DVDs offer a second life to TV series like Peacemakers, and HBO's Deadwood. In 2002, a show called Firefly (created by Joss Whedon) mixed the Western genre with science fiction. Breaking Bad, a neo-Western about crystal methamphetamine cooks in Albuquerque, NM, debuted in 2008 on AMC.

=== 2010s and 2020s ===
Series with Western themes that debuted in the 2010s include Justified, about a Western-style vigilante U.S. Marshal based in modern rural Kentucky, which debuted in 2010 on FX; Hell on Wheels, about the construction of the First transcontinental railroad across the United States, which debuted in 2011 on AMC; and Longmire, about a modern-day Wyoming sheriff, which debuted in 2012 on A&E. The Mandalorian (2019) is a space Western set within the Star Wars franchise and universe, with its lead character, a Mandalorian, roaming the galactic frontier and borrowing character traits from Clint Eastwood.

With the growth of cable television and direct broadcast satellites, reruns of Westerns have become more common. Upon its launch in 1996, TV Land carried a block of Westerns on Sundays; the network still airs Bonanza and the color episodes of Gunsmoke to the present day, which make up several hours of their daytime schedule. Encore Westerns, part of the Encore slate of premium channels, airs blocks of Western series in the morning and in the afternoon, while the channel airs Western films the rest of the day. MeTV, a digital broadcast channel, includes Westerns in its regular schedule as well, as does sister network Heroes & Icons. The family oriented INSP and Grit, another digital broadcast channel, also carry Westerns on its daytime schedules. INSP, previously a televangelism network, had such success with its Westerns that it adopted a nearly all-Western format in 2022. Several Westerns have episodes that have lapsed into the public domain in the United States, allowing networks and stations to carry them without cost.

Yellowstone, a neo-Western that debuted in 2018, jumped in ratings over the course of its third and fourth seasons to become one of cable television's most popular programs. Yellowstone, in turn, inspired a traditionally-set Western prequel, 1883, in 2021, and another series, 1923, a year later, both of which were successes.

== See also ==
- List of Western television series
- Rural purge
- List of genres
