= Rick Moses =

American actor and singer-songwriter (born 1952)

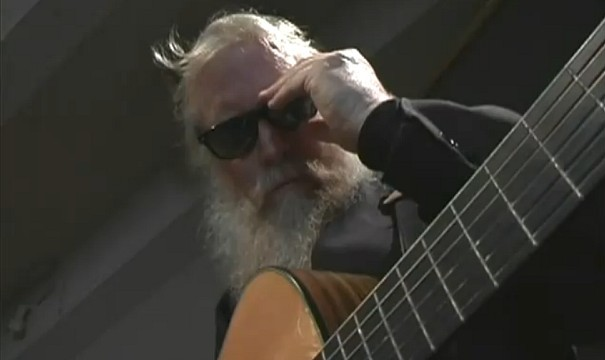
- Rick Moses in 2005

Background information
- Born: Richard Cantrell Moses, Jr. September 5, 1952 (age 74); Washington, District of Columbia, US
- Genres: Rock, traditional pop
- Occupations: Singer-songwriter, actor, film producer, director, screenwriter
- Years active: 1970–present
- Labels: 20th Century Fox, Teldec Records, Solaris Records
- Website: rickmoses.com

Rick Moses (born September 5, 1952) is an American actor and singer-songwriter.

== Early life ==
Moses was born in Washington, D.C. He is the oldest son of advertising executive Richard Cantrell Moses, Sr. and Marian McCargo (1932–2004). Moses has three siblings; brothers Graham, Harry and Billy. He grew up in Pasadena, California where he showed an interest in wrestling, swimming, movies, and music. His mother enrolled him in various AAU swim clubs and bought him a guitar. She drove him to Hollywood and enrolled him in acting classes.

Moses attended boarding school at the Chadwick School in Palos Verdes, California where he was an all C.I.F. swimmer. In high school, Moses joined with friends to form several bands. They played parties and weddings with some success. Moses had been studying martial arts since age thirteen, becoming a student of notable instructors including Bruce Lee, Ed Parker and Bob Ozman. He continued the training throughout his life, earning a black-belt in Isshin-Ryu Karate. He worked as an instructor for Bob Ozman at his Van Nuys studio. At Andover in Andover, Massachusetts, he was named to the N.I.S.C.A. Prep School All-America Swimming Team for three years in a row from 1969 to 1971 in events including Butterfly, Freestyle, 200-yard medley relay and 400-yard freestyle relay.

== Career ==
Moses began his acting career in 1967, at age fifteen, in an Equity production of The Fifth Season at the Santa Monica Playhouse. In 1970, he appeared in an episode of Room 222, followed in 1971 with roles on Mission: Impossible and The F.B.I. He appeared in a production of Jean-Paul Sartre's Dirty Hands (Les Mains Sales) at the Gallery Theatre in Hollywood. He headlined at Ye Little Club, a popular venue in Beverly Hills. Roger Ailes spotted him on an episode of Owen Marshall. Ailes invited Moses to become a client. Moses moved to New York City. Ailes arranged an audition for Moses to perform for Budd Friedman, the owner of the well known New York night club The Improv. Moses’ style clicked with Friedman and New York audiences. Moses became the only male singer to work the club regularly during that period along with the then unknown comedians Jay Leno, Richard Lewis, and Andy Kaufman. Moses worked a number of east coast night clubs, including Host's Farm in Lancaster, Pennsylvania, and Michael's Pub in Manhattan, for several years, returning weekly to the Improv. He was hired to do a backer's audition for a prospective New York show that was mounted in Los Angeles. Budd Friedman had just opened his L.A. Improv. Moses was rehearsing the play by day and performing at the Improv at night. Moses was a veteran night club performer at this point. Standing ovations were not unusual for his twenty-minute sets. (Westways magazine did an article on this phenomenon.) A talent coordinator for the nationally syndicated Merv Griffin Show (Don Kane) was present one night. Two weeks later, Moses appeared on Merv's show. Merv, a successful singer himself for several decades, had Moses back 18 times in a nine-month period.

In 1977, Moses played the title role in the prime-time action adventure drama Young Dan'l Boone on CBS. In 1978, Moses played the role of Bruce Scott in the feature film Avalanche which starred Rock Hudson and Mia Farrow. Also in 1978, 20th Century Fox record division released his LP album Face the Music.

Moses is probably best known for playing Jefferson Smith Hutchins "(Hitman) Hutch" in the day-time soap opera General Hospital, from 1979 to 1980 on ABC. The story-line, carried by "Luke, Laura, and Hutch" made General Hospital one of the most popular shows on television. Time Magazine did an article on the subject.

Moses had a hit in Germany in 1985 with the song "If I Could Just Fall in Love" released by Teldec Records of Hamburg, Germany as a 12" vinyl record. It was also made into a music video directed by the German filmmaker Utz Weber.

In 1986, Moses played Niles Perry, the rock star love interest of Eve Harper, played by Linda Purl, in the TV movie Pleasures.

His CD Evil and Dangerous Men was released in 2005 and received favorable reviews.

Evil and Dangerous Men
Sample of "Evil and Dangerous Men" by Rick Moses, (2005)

The title song of the album was derived from the short film Jack Takes a Vacation that was co-produced, co-written and directed by Moses. He also played the title role. Scenes from the film were intercut and used in the music video for "Evil and Dangerous Men".

In November 2022, Rick released the album "The Heart of the King.

== Personal life ==
Moses married Joni Morris in 1974. They had two sons, Richard III and Tarrant, before they separated in 1982. In 1988, Moses married Colette Benhaim. They have four children together, all sons: Ronson, Adam, Dan and Naftali.

Moses was raised an Episcopalian but in his forties he converted to Orthodox Judaism. In an interview with Internet journalist Luke Ford, Moses related that, after his sons, "Judaism became the singular most important thing to me." He also stated: "I put my energies into (the study of Judaism) the same way a young man who wished to become a doctor would apply himself to his studies in medical school."
