= Don Dorrell =

American film and television actor

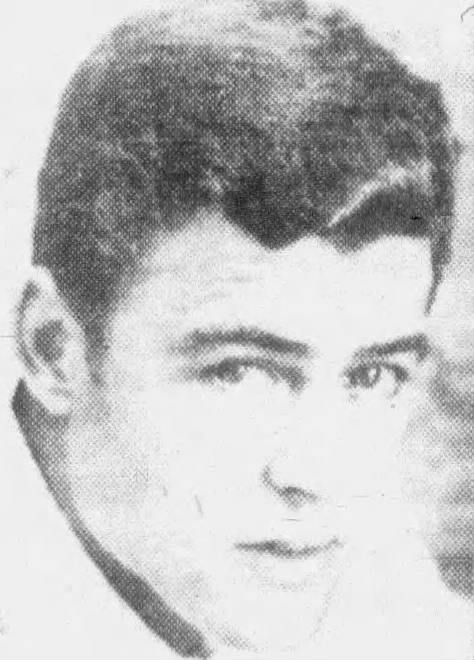
- Dorrell in 1962
- Born: Donald Evans Dorrell; December 26, 1933; Brownsville, Texas, U.S.
- Died: May 3, 2003 (aged 69); Port Ludlow, Washington, U.S.
- Education: University of California, Los Angeles
- Occupations: Film and television actor
- Years active: 1959–1965
- Spouse(s): Patricia McNulty; Joy Dorrell

Donald Evans Dorrell (December 26, 1933 – May 3, 2003) was an American film and television actor. He was best known for playing Donovan in the American western television series Pony Express.

== Life and career ==
Dorrell was born in Brownsville, Texas, the son of Vernon Dorrell, an aviator. He attended and graduated from Notre Dame High School. After graduating, He served in the United States Army during the Korean War.

In 1959, Dorrell began his screen career, where joined the cast of the syndicated western television series Pony Express starring as Brett Clark's troubleshooter Donovan, starring along with Grant Sullivan. He then played Jud Donovan in the 1961 film The Gambler Wore a Gun, and Roger in the film Tammy Tell Me True. Other film appearances included the roles of Stoney Jackson in When the Girls Take Over, Payne in Ensign Pulver, and Private Hoxie in None but the Brave. He also guest-starred in an episode of the NBC sitcom television series Hazel. In 1962, he survived a plane crash in the sea off Avalon, California.

Dorrell retired from acting in 1965, last appearing in the film That Darn Cat!. After retiring from acting, he worked as a pilot for twenty-five years. During his piloting career, he attended University of California, Los Angeles, earning his master's degree in 1974.

== Death ==
Dorrell died of cancer on May 3, 2003, in Port Ludlow, Washington, at the age of 69.
