= Grant Sullivan (actor) =

American actor

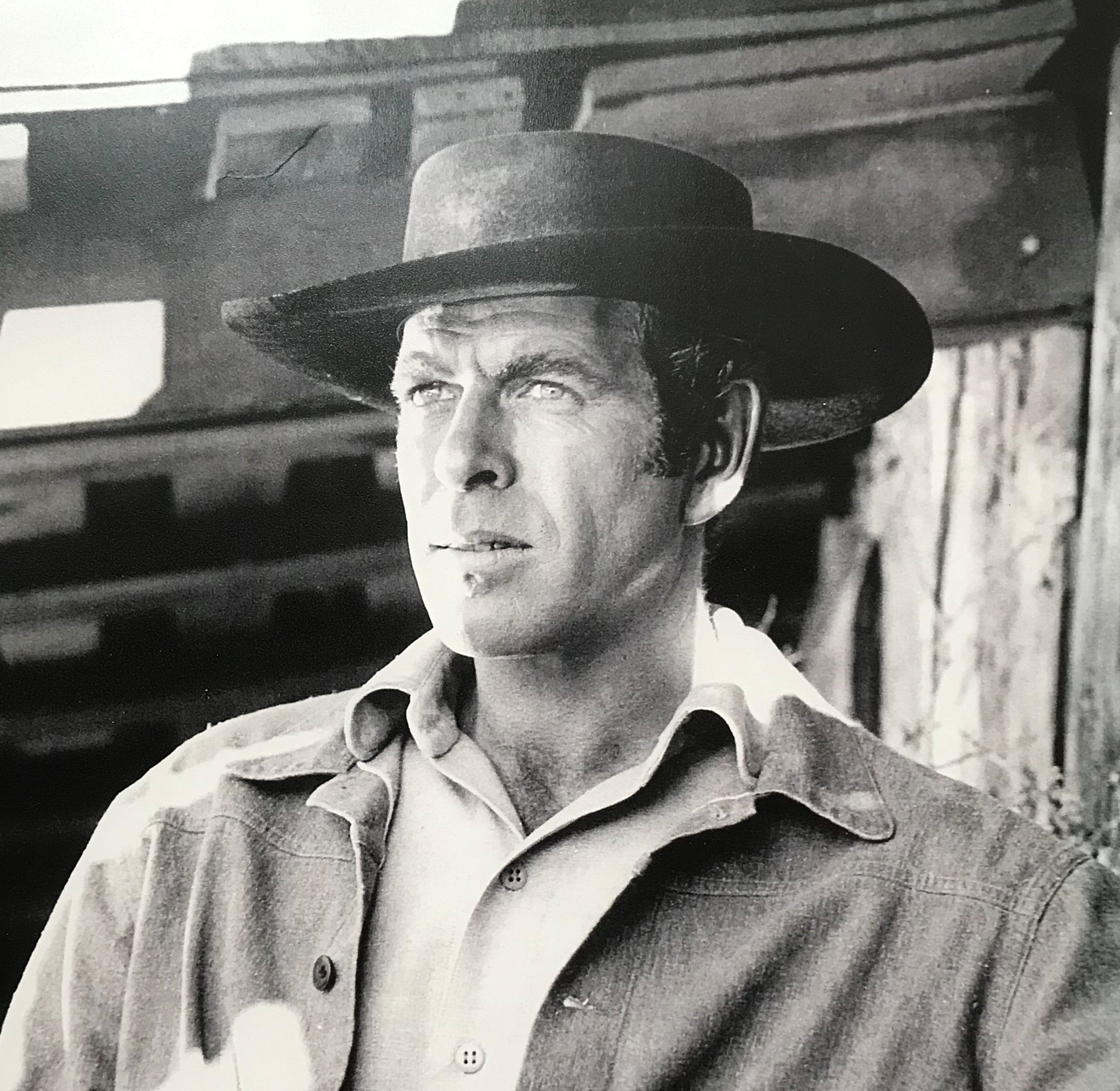
- Sullivan in Pony Express press photo
- Born: Jerry Schulz; June 30, 1924; Fremont, Nebraska, U.S.
- Died: May 31, 2011 (aged 86); Laguna Beach, California, U.S.
- Occupation(s): Actor, realtor
- Spouses: Mary Samuel (m. 1951); Olgita De Castro (m. 1962); Valedia Sullivan (m. c. 1969–2011)

Grant Sullivan (born Jerry Schulz, June 30, 1924 – May 31, 2011) was an American actor who starred as investigator Brett Clark in the television series, Pony Express, which aired in syndication from 1959 to 1960. He starred with Don Dorrell.

== Early years ==
The Fremont, Nebraska-born Jerry Schulz was reared in Southern California. As a student at Anaheim Union High School, he excelled in sports and on stage.

Sullivan was a meteorologist in the United States Navy during World War II. He changed his name to Grant Sullivan and appeared on Broadway in Auntie Mame (1956) before he moved to television roles. His other stage credits included Happy Birthday with Joan Blondell, Portrait Of a Lady with Jennifer Jones, and Tonight Or Never with Ilona Massey.

For his role in Pony Express, he trained to ride horses with stuntman/actor Boyd Morgan.

Prior to Pony Express, Sullivan appeared in such series as The Secret Files of Captain Video, Robert Montgomery Presents, 77 Sunset Strip, and Ray Milland's Markham. Once his own series ended, he was cast in two 1961 episodes of Dale Robertson's western series, Tales of Wells Fargo, "The Diamond Dude" and "Death Raffle." In 1965, he guest starred on Robert Culp's I Spy on NBC. In 1966, he appeared in Jim Nabors' Gomer Pyle, USMC. In 1967, he was a cast as a space alien in the episode "Kidnapped in Space" on CBS's Lost in Space.

== Realtor ==
Sullivan left acting in the early 1970s and became a realtor. He worked as a business executive for both Mission Viejo Company and Great Western Real Estate until his retirement.

== Personal life ==
In June 1951, Sullivan married Mary Samuel, who was known as Maxine when she performed with the Hour of Charm Orchestra. In 1962, he married Olgita De Castro, a member of The DeCastro Sisters singing group. He was married to Valedia Sullivan for 42 years.

== Death ==
Sullivan died of cancer at his home in Laguna Beach, California on May 31, 2011, aged 86.
