= Robert Anderson (actor, born 1920) =

American film and television actor (1920–1996)

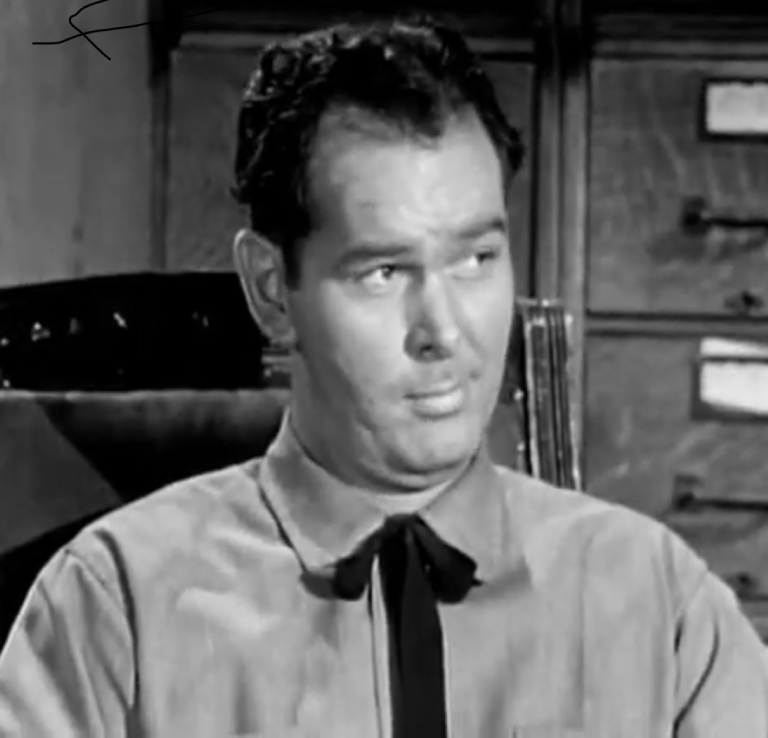
- Anderson in Stories of the Century, 1954
- Born: Robert Gerold Anderson; July 12, 1920; Grand Forks, North Dakota, U.S.
- Died: January 4, 1996 (aged 75); Desert Hot Springs, California, U.S.
- Education: University of Florida
- Occupations: Film and television actor

Robert Gerold Anderson (July 12, 1920 – January 4, 1996) was an American film and television actor. He was best known for playing blacksmith Aeneas MacLinahan in the American western television series Wichita Town.

== Life and career ==
Anderson was born in Grand Forks, North Dakota, the son of Oscar Anderson and Mabel Dalen. He attended the University of Florida, and served in the United States Army during World War II. He began his screen career in 1946, appearing in the film Without Reservations. In 1949, he appeared in the films The Story of Molly X and Undertow. During his screen career, he worked as a radio announcer for the radio program The Lone Wolfe from 1948 to 1949.

Later in his career, in 1957, Anderson starred as trial lawyer Park Street Jr. in the NBC television series The Court of Last Resort, starring along with Robert H. Harris, Carleton Young, S. John Launer and John Maxwell. After the series ended in 1958, he played blacksmith Aeneas MacLinahan in the NBC western television series Wichita Town from 1959 to 1960. He guest-starred in numerous television programs including Gunsmoke, Bonanza, Wagon Train, Tombstone Territory, Have Gun – Will Travel, The Life and Legend of Wyatt Earp, The Californians, Rawhide, Tales of Wells Fargo and Daniel Boone. He also appeared in numerous films such as Fury at Gunsight Pass, The Toy Tiger, Young Billy Young, Period of Adjustment, Pal Joey, The Gambler Wore a Gun, Born to the Saddle, The Outlaw Stallion and Rancho Notorious.

Anderson retired from acting in 1970, last appearing in the NBC western television series The High Chaparral.

== Death ==
Anderson died on January 4, 1996, at the Desert Hospital Hospice in Desert Hot Springs, California, at the age of 75.
