= Sam Buffington =

American actor (1931–1960)

- Sam Buffington in Perry Mason 1959
- Born: Samuel Elisha Buffington; October 12, 1931; Swansea, Massachusetts, U.S.
- Died: May 15, 1960 (aged 28); West Hollywood, California, U.S.
- Education: Leland Powers School
- Occupation: Actor
- Spouse: Patricia Ann Whitehouse (m. 1953)

Sam Buffington (October 12, 1931 – May 15, 1960) was an American actor whose short career included performances on stage, radio, film, and television. He was the star of the CBS radio series Luke Slaughter of Tombstone during 1958 and was one of three regular cast members on Whispering Smith. His stage and screen roles were limited to character parts. His career was going strong and had good prospects when, at age 28, he committed suicide.

== Early years ==
He was born in Swansea, Massachusetts, the youngest of four children for Carl Buffington, a lumber company manager, and Annette Gendron. His parents were in their forties when Buffington was born, and his nearest sibling was eight years older. At age 18, Buffington appears as a roomer in a boarding house in Brookline, Massachusetts during 1950, when he was attending the Leland Powers School of Radio and Theater. According to a 1951 newspaper article, he was working in nightclubs as an MC and comic dancer.

== Early career ==
Buffington's first known professional stage credits come from summer stock with the Allegheny Players at the Mishler Theatre in Altoona, Pennsylvania. He was signed to perform character parts in six plays, each with a week-long run. After the Mishler run completed, the Allegheny Players performed for a week in Ebensburg, Pennsylvania, where Buffington had the male lead in a comedy.

== Radio and stage ==
For the years 1952 through 1955 Buffington worked in both radio and on the stage. His radio work was at a station in Providence, Rhode Island, where according to a later interview, he had three shows under three different names and as many voices. Buffington lamented, "The unfortunate thing about it was that I only got the salary of one man". His stage work continued to be with the Allegheny Players during the summer seasons.

== West Coast career ==
=== Screen beginnings ===
Discouraged by lack of work on the East Coast, Buffington and his wife moved to the West Coast during 1956. He told a later interviewer: "We figured it couldn't be any worse. But it was. We had just $90 when we got here. The first eight months she had to work to support me". Then, he began appearing in small roles on television, and in a Grade B film, Invasion of the Saucer Men. His breakthrough came in May 1957 with an episode of Alfred Hitchcock Presents, wherein he played a thoroughly disagreeable character. Reviews claimed "...it's Sam Buffington's portrayal of a rude, sloppy hypochondriac which steals the show". Within the next six months he would have roles in six films, all released in 1958, and five more television shows, an auspicious first year.

For the film Damn Citizen, a reviewer said: "Sam Buffington does a splendid job of making himself thoroughly unpleasant in the role of a gambling casino operator". Another reported: "Sam Buffington's cunning small-time gambler is about twice as convincing as the real thing would be and also very amusing". This was the high point of his film career; in no other movie did he capture critical attention. His career would continue to thrive on the small screen, as he completed more television episodes with each succeeding year.

Buffington appeared as himself on a local interview program titled Meet the People during February 1958. This was a lead-in to his starring role on a new CBS national radio program.

=== Luke Slaughter of Tombstone ===
While filming an episode of The Gray Ghost, Buffington had asked Lillian Buyeff how she had gotten a gig on the radio drama Suspense. She sent him to Bill Robson, a CBS radio producer, and about two months later Buffington was cast for the lead in a CBS radio western.

Luke Slaughter of Tombstone began broadcasting on February 23, 1958, with Buffington playing the title character. He portrayed a cavalryman, who after the Civil War becomes a cattleman in Arizona. The nationally heard program began five minutes after the hour, following a short CBS News break. It was one of three western series broadcast by CBS on Sunday afternoons. The program ran twenty-five minutes per episode, including commercials.

The first episode had Slaughter drive a herd of cattle from Texas to Tombstone, while the second had him dealing with renegade lawmen who were after the proceeds from the cattle sale. The series was suspended during July 1958, and Buffington used the time off to perform in Bell, Book and Candle with the La Jolla Playhouse.

Despite his radio commitment, Buffington managed to appear in 16 episodes of television during 1958. He also completed film work for They Came to Cordura, released the following year. In 1959, he did seventeen more television episodes, before landing a regular cast member spot in early 1960 on a new western series.

=== Whispering Smith ===
This half-hour western series made at Revue Studios for NBC starred Audie Murphy and Guy Mitchell as frontier detectives for the Denver Police Department, c. 1870. Buffington, who was third-credited, played their superior officer, Chief of Police John Richards. In the film Unwed Mother, he played husband to actress Dorothy Adams.

== Death and controversy ==
While Buffington's wife Pat was in Palm Springs, California, he wrote a note to her, locked himself in the bathroom, sealed air passages under the door and window and turned on a gas jet. When she returned home to West Hollywood, California on Sunday evening, May 15, 1960, she had to break-in the bathroom door. Buffington was dead; his note apologized to her for not being able to support her and requested cremation. Buffington's friends expressed surprise at the note, since he had made over $20,000 the year before (Note: The equivalent of over $200,000 in 2023.) and had good career prospects. Brief stories appeared the next day in California newspapers detailing the circumstances. The UPI story, with a West Hollywood dateline, cited alternatively police and sheriff's detectives as the source, but was carried by only one out-of-state newspaper. There were no follow-up stories to the original UPI release, nor did any newspapers carry the original story after the first day. This was a highly unusual story arc for such a newsworthy event, and suggests UPI pulled the original release.

When a year had passed, and Whispering Smith was finally set to debut on NBC television, newspaper announcements made only a brief reference to "the late Sam Buffington, who died after only 20 episodes were filmed".

== Personal life ==
An accomplished painter of portraits in oil, Buffington once tried to make a living of it. After he became an actor, he donated eight of his works to children's hospitals.

Buffington married Patricia Ann Whitehouse on July 15, 1953 in Vance County, North Carolina. They remained married until his death in 1960.

== Stage performances ==
Listed by year of first performance

Year	Play	Role	Venue	Notes
1951	You Can't Take It with You (play)	Boris Kolenkhov	Mishler Theatre	Buffington's first role with the Allegheny Players.
1951	Ah, Wilderness!	Nat Miller	Mishler Theatre	
1951	See How They Run	Bishop of Lax	Mishler Theatre	
1951	Night Must Fall	Hubert Laurie	Mishler Theatre	
1951	Petticoat Fever	Rector	Mishler Theatre	
1951	Bertha the Typewriter Girl	Daniel Desmond	Mishler Theatre	Buffington's first lead role was as a melodrama villain.
1951	Brighten the Corner	Neil Carson	Centre Theatre	This was a 1945 comedy by John Cecil Holm that lasted only one month on Broadway.
1954	The Curious Savage		Standing Stone Playhouse	
1954	Tonight at 8.30	Toby Cartwright	Standing Stone Playhouse	Buffington was the male lead in Ways and Means.
1958	Bell, Book and Candle	Sidney Redlitch	La Jolla Playhouse (Note: Before the 1983 revival of this production company, it had no dedicated venue, and it relied on the auditorium of La Jolla High School.)	A single set version that starred Scott Forbes, Felicia Farr, and Darryl Hickman.

== Filmography ==
By year of first release
Year	Title	Role	Notes
1957	Invasion of the Saucer Men	Colonel Ambrose	
1958	The Rawhide Trail (Note: The working title was The Rawhide Breed.)	James Willard	Filmed during October 1957.
1958	The Brothers Karamazov	Tipsy Merchant	uncredited
1958	Damn Citizen	DeButts	At least one newspaper account had the working title as Damned Citizen.
1958	King Creole	Dr. Martin Cabot	uncredited
1958	The Light in the Forest	George Owens	Filmed during August and September 1957.
1958	Unwed Mother (Note: The working title was Teen-Age Mother.)	Mr. Paully	Filmed during December 1957, Buffington and Dorothy Adams play a married couple (Note: Adams was 31 years older than Buffington, who at age 26 seemed twice his actual age.) who are prospective adoptee parents.
1959	Blue Denim	Doctor	Uncredited
1959	They Came to Cordura	First Correspondent	filmed on location at St. George, Utah during November 1958

== Television performances ==
Television in original broadcast order
Year	Series	Episode	Role	Notes
1957	Cheyenne	The Iron Trail	Allen Chester	
1957	The Man Called X	Passport		
1957	Conflict	Capital Punishment		Starred Will Hutchins, with Rex Reason, Edward Binns, Ray Teal, and Barbara Eiler.
1957	Highway Patrol	Trojan Horse	Whitey Larkin	
1957	Cheyenne	The Spanish Grant	Sam Tyson	
1957	Tales of Wells Fargo	The Lynching	Sheriff Bill Egan	
1957	Alfred Hitchcock Presents	Season 2, Episode 35: "The West Warlock Time Capsule"	Waldren	Reviewers praised Buffington's portrayal of the hypochondriac brother-in-law.
1957	Schlitz Playhouse	The Face of a Killer		
1957	The Adventures of Jim Bowie	Epitaph for an Indian	Sheriff Pete Webber	
1957	The Adventures of McGraw	Lucky's Diner	Lucky	
1957	General Electric Theater	The Iron Rose	Bill Meadows	Buffington was impressed with the acting talent of episode star Vincent Price.
1957	Maverick	The Quick and the Dead	Ponca Brown	
1957	The Gray Ghost	Jimmy	Matt Dawson	
1958	Alfred Hitchcock Presents	Season 3, Episode 15: "Together"	Charles	Directed by Robert Altman, it starred Joseph Cotten and Christine White.
1958	Sugarfoot	Deadlock	Ruby Martin	
1958	Meet the People	(1958-02-05)	Himself	local noontime interview program on KTLA Channel 5 in Los Angeles
1958	Tombstone Territory	The Outlaw's Bugle	Monte Davis	Buffington starts a newspaper titled The Bugle to secretly aid cattle rustlers.
1958	Maverick	The Seventh Hand	Logan	Buffington uses Samantha Crawford (Diane Brewster) as a catspaw to strike at Bret Maverick (James Garner).
1958	The Adventures of Jim Bowie	Up the Creek	Sheriff	
1958	Mike Hammer	For Sale, Deathbed, Used	Sam Earl	
1958	The Silent Service	The Tigershark	Chief Joe Wilson	
1958	U.S. Marshal	Ambush	Rich	
1958	Behind Closed Doors	Trouble in Test Cell 19	William Horne	
1958	77 Sunset Strip	Casualty	Vincent Manchester	
1958	Wanted: Dead or Alive	The Favor	Fred the Bartender	
1958	Maverick	The Thirty-Ninth Star	Bigelow	
1958	Peter Gunn	Death House Testament	Professor Olford	As an alcoholic professor, Buffington administers a truth serum to Peter Gunn.
1958	Sugarfoot	Yampa Crossing	Henry Dixon	Buffinton's role in this was described as "a genial opportunist".
1958	Wanted Dead or Alive	Eight Cent Reward	Hap Haefer	A Christmas story with Buffington as one of three frontier "wise men".
1959	Zane Grey Theatre	Day of the Killing	Frank - Bartender	
1959	Wanted Dead or Alive	Six-Up to Bannach	Abb Crawford	Buffington rides shotgun on a stagecoach transporting dynamite.
1959	Perry Mason	The Case of the Foot Loose Doll	Fred Ernshaw	Buffington is a junior partner to an unscrupulous detective.
1959	Maverick	Yellow River	Professor von Schulenberg	
1959	Steve Canyon	Blackmail	Karl Janosek	
1959	Black Saddle	Client: Jessup	Noah Bailey	
1959	The Ann Sothern Show	The Square Peg	Mr. Stewart	
1959	Gunsmoke	Buffalo Hunter	Cook	
1959	Alfred Hitchcock Presents	Season 4, Episode 30: "A Night with the Boys"	Smalley	Buffington is a bullying boss who forces his employee (John Smith) into a poker game.
1959	Bat Masterson	The Death of Bat Masterson	Judge D.B. Hodie	As a crooked judge, Buffington conspired to steal Masterson's (Gene Barry) money.
1959	The Thin Man	Hamilton Hollered Help	Doc	
1959	The Rough Riders	Reluctant Witness (Note: IMDb has the episode as "Reluctant Hostage".)	Ephraim Hoggs	Buffington, at age 27, played an old hermit.
1959	Whirlybirds	The Perfect Crime	Mayor Edwards	
1959	The Alaskans	Gold Sled	Count Meshikov	Buffington played a treacherous guide to lost gold.
1959	77 Sunset Strip	Thanks for tomorrow	Mr. Anton	
1959	Maverick	A Fellow's Brother	Burgess	When Bret Maverick gets a local reputation, it attracts bounty hunter Burgess (Buffington).
1959	Mr. Lucky	Little Miss Wow	Freddy Furlong	Buffington and Don Gordon are inept kidnappers of Yvonne Craig.
1960	Alcoa Theatre	The Last Flight Out	Informer	Story set in Quemoy during the Second Taiwan Strait Crisis
1960	Hawaiian Eye	Then There Were Three	Big Jim MacIntosh	Buffington is a treacherous estate manager who seeks an inheritance.
1960	The Man from Blackhawk	Execution Day	Josiah Cartwright	
1960	Laramie	Saddle and Spur	Franklin	
1960	Bourbon Street Beat	Ferry to Algiers	Junius Rattner	
1961	Whispering Smith	17 episodes	John Richards	Buffington had appeared in 17 episodes before his death in May 1960.
1961	The Barbara Stanwyck Show	A Man's Game	Vic Trenton	First broadcast in July 1961, it would have been filmed before May 1960.
