= Siloam Springs, Gentry County, Missouri =

Extinct hamlet in Missouri, U.S.

Coordinates: 40°22′23″N 94°15′51″W

Siloam Springs is an extinct hamlet in northeast Gentry County, in the U.S. state of Missouri.

The community is located on Missouri Route DD one mile south of the Gentry-Worth county line. Big Muddy Creek flows past the south side of the community. Denver is 3.5 miles to the northwest in Worth County.

== History ==
Various names were Areola Springs, Free Water, Gara, Siloam, and Siloam City. The name may be derived from the ancient site of Siloam in Jerusalem.
