= George Sowards =

American film and television actor

- Sowards in 1937
- Born: George Albert Sowards; November 27, 1888; Denver, Missouri, U.S.
- Died: December 20, 1975 (aged 87); Los Angeles County, California, U.S.
- Occupations: Film and television actor
- Spouse: Edna E. Zielke (m. 1914)
- Relatives: Len Sowards (brother)

George Albert Sowards (November 27, 1888 – December 20, 1975) was an American film and television actor.

== Life and career ==
Sowards was born in Denver, Missouri. He was the brother of Len Sowards, an actor. He worked as a railroad section hand in Nevada, and in 1921, he appeared in the silent western film Outlawed. The next year, he appeared in the films Step on It! and Back Fire. During his screen career, he worked as a horse wrangler and a stage driver in silent films.

Later in his career, Sowards guest-starred in numerous television programs including Gunsmoke, Bonanza, Wagon Train, The Life and Legend of Wyatt Earp, The Deputy, The Adventures of Kit Carson, Tales of Wells Fargo, Wanted: Dead or Alive, The Wild Wild West, The Fugitive and Rawhide. He also appeared in numerous films such as Daredevils of the West, One Foot in Hell, Gun Runner, Seven Ways from Sundown, Carson City, To Kill a Mockingbird, Ranger of Cherokee Strip, Day of the Badman and The Horse Soldiers.

Sowards retired from acting in 1967, last appearing in the film The Adventures of Bullwhip Griffin.

== Death ==
Sowards died on December 20, 1975, in Los Angeles County, California, at the age of 87. He was buried at Forest Lawn Memorial Park.
