= List of Wanted Dead or Alive episodes =

Wanted Dead or Alive is an American Western television series starring Steve McQueen as bounty hunter Josh Randall. It aired on CBS for three seasons in 1958–1961. The black-and-white program was a spin-off of a March 1958 episode of Trackdown, a 1957–1959 Western series starring Robert Culp. Both series were produced by Vincent Fennelly for Four Star Television in association with CBS.

The series made McQueen a television star. He would later crossover into comparable status on the big screen, making him the first TV star to do so.

== Series overview ==
Season	Episodes	Originally released		Rank	Average viewership (in millions)
Season	Episodes	First released	Last released	Rank	Average viewership (in millions)
1	36	September 6, 1958	May 9, 1959	16	28.0
2	32	September 5, 1959	May 21, 1960	9	28.7
3	26	September 21, 1960	March 29, 1961	TBA	TBA

== Episodes ==
=== Season 1 (1958–1959) ===
No. overall	No. in season	Title	Directed by	Written by	Original release date
1	1	"The Martin Poster"	Thomas Carr	John Robinson	September 6, 1958
Josh Randall witnesses two brothers (Michael Landon, Nick Adams) shoot a sheriff, and he tracks them down. With John Cliff, Dabbs Greer and Jenifer Lea.
2	2	"Fatal Memory"	Thomas Carr	Don Brinkley	September 13, 1958
Colonel Sykes (Russell Thorson), Josh's former commander, is listed as a wanted man on a poster counterfeited by a dead man's wife (Joan Banks). With Gloria Talbot, Ralph Moody and Victor Perrin.
3	3	"The Bounty"	Thomas Carr	Samuel A. Peeples	September 20, 1958
Josh clashes with a sadistic bounty hunter as they search for a reclusive old man with an Apache bodyguard wanted for a crime committed years ago.
4	4	"Dead End"	Thomas Carr	George F. Slavin	September 27, 1958
Josh is hired by a rancher to find a man wanted for grand theft and kidnapping.
5	5	"The Passing of Shawnee Bill"	Thomas Carr	David Lang	October 4, 1958
A stranger offers to help Josh capture a fugitive in return for half the reward. With Alan Hale Jr.
6	6	"The Giveaway Gun"	Donald McDougall	Frank D. Gilroy	October 11, 1958
Josh searches for a gunfighter identified by the way he draws his pistol. With Everett Sloane, Frank Faylen, Lurene Tuttle, Richard Devon, John Harmon and Addison Richard.
7	7	"Ransom for a Nun"	Donald McDougall	Fred Freiberger	October 18, 1958
Josh offers to take a killer to Tucson because the sheriff is worried about a rescue attempt by the outlaw's gang, who are holding a nun hostage.
8	8	"Miracle at Pot Hole"	Thomas Carr	Ellis Marcus	October 25, 1958
Josh finds a suspected murderer, then begins to doubt the man's guilt.
9	9	"The Fourth Headstone"	Donald McDougall	Frank D. Gilroy	November 1, 1958
Josh tries to help a woman he suspects has been framed for murder.
10	10	"Til Death Do Us Part"	Donald McDougall	Don Brinkley	November 8, 1958
Josh tracks down a woman wanted for murdering her husband.
11	11	"The Favor"	Thomas Carr	John Robinson	November 15, 1958
As a favor for a sheriff, Josh embarks on a perilous journey to bring a murder suspect to justice. With Sam Buffington.
12	12	"Ricochet"	Donald McDougall	Tony Barrett	November 22, 1958
A woman hires Josh to find her husband, for whom she plans death.
13	13	"Sheriff of Red Rock"	Thomas Carr	Philip Saltzman	November 29, 1958
Josh brings in a wanted man who is a member of a bounty hunter gang in cahoots with the local sheriff.
14	14	"Die by the Gun"	Donald McDougall	Story by : Lawrence Menkin; Teleplay by : Christopher Knopf and Lawrence Menkin	December 6, 1958
Josh and his prisoner wanted for robbery are ambushed by killers. With Warren Oates.
15	15	"Rawhide Breed"	Donald McDougall	Samuel A. Peeples	December 13, 1958
A stagecoach carrying Josh and his prisoner is attacked by Indians.
16	16	"Eight Cent Reward"	Thomas Carr	Story by : John Robinson; Teleplay by : Christopher Knopf	December 20, 1958
Josh is given a most unusual assignment: bringing in Santa Claus. With Sam Buffington.
17	17	"Drop to Drink"	Donald McDougall	Wells Root	December 27, 1958
A Pony Express company hires Josh to solve the mystery of a murdered rider and a stolen ring.
18	18	"Rope Law"	Thomas Carr	Donn Mullally	January 3, 1959
A lynch mob intends to hang Josh's prisoner, who has been falsely accused of his stepdaughter's murder.
19	19	"Six-Up to Bannach"	Thomas Carr	John Robinson	January 10, 1959
A stagecoach carrying Josh and his prisoner races against time to save an innocent man from an unjust hanging. With James Best and Sam Buffington.
20	20	"The Spurs"	Donald McDougall	David Lang	January 17, 1959
Josh tracks down a bank robber in spite of reports claiming the robber has been murdered. With Betsy Drake and Dick Foran.
21	21	"Reunion for Revenge"	R.G. Springsteen	Richard H. Landau	January 24, 1959
Josh brings in a man wanted by the law and a group of escaped convicts who blame him for sending them to prison. With Ralph Meeker and James Coburn.
22	22	"Competition"	R.G. Springsteen	Daniel B. Ullman	January 31, 1959
Josh meets two evil bounty hunters he must take out of his way.
23	23	"Call Your Shot"	Donald McDougall	Fred Freiberger	February 7, 1959
Josh is hired to find a drunk's son.
24	24	"Secret Ballot"	Donald McDougall	Don Brinkley	February 14, 1959
Josh tries to help the mayoral campaign of his friend Ned Easter. With DeForest Kelley and Bethel Leslie.
25	25	"The Corner"	R.G. Springsteen	D.D. Beauchamp and Mary M. Beauchamp	February 21, 1959
Josh is wrongly accused of murdering a friend.
26	26	"Eager Man"	Donald McDougall	Ray Buffum	February 28, 1959
A fugitive is eager to let Josh take him in, but only if his wife is willing to share the reward.
27	27	"The Legend"	Thomas Carr	Tony Barrett	March 7, 1959
Josh finds himself up against a pair of desperados in search of a legendary lost treasure. With Warren Oates.
28	28	"Railroaded"	Thomas Carr	D.D. Beauchamp and Mary M. Beauchamp	March 14, 1959
Josh must prove that a young boy did not murder a detective. With Edgar Buchanan.
29	29	"Double Fee"	Donald McDougall	Ellis Marcus	March 21, 1959
An opera singer involves Josh in a kidnapping case. With Diane Brewster.
30	30	"The Kovack Affair"	Thomas Carr	Story by : John Robinson; Teleplay by : D.D. Beauchamp and Mary M. Beauchamp	March 28, 1959
A friend turns to Josh for help when he's pressured into relinquishing his controlling interest in a hotel. With James Coburn.
31	31	"Bounty for a Bride"	Donald McDougall	Samuel A. Peeples	April 4, 1959
Josh fights a fierce Apache for the hand of an Indian princess.
32	32	"Crossroads"	Donald McDougall	David Lang	April 11, 1959
A fugitive's father attempts to stop Josh from capturing his son.
33	33	"Angels of Vengeance"	R.G. Springsteen	Charles Beaumont	April 18, 1959
A religious cult seeks vengeance on Josh for murdering its leader's son. With John Dehner.
34	34	"Littlest Client"	Thomas Carr	Story by : Ray Buffum; Teleplay by : John Robinson and Ray Buffum	April 25, 1959
A child refuses to believe her father is dead, so she asks Josh to find him.
35	35	"The Conquerors"	Thomas Carr	Fred Freiberger	May 2, 1959
A banker hires Josh to find his son, who has joined a gang of conquerors. With John Dehner.
36	36	"Amos Carter"	Thomas Carr	John Robinson	May 9, 1959
Josh attempts to end a feud between two hillbilly families.

=== Season 2 (1959–1960) ===
No. overall	No. in season	Title	Directed by	Written by	Original release date
37	1	"The Montana Kid"	Thomas Carr	D.D. Beauchamp and Mary M. Beauchamp	September 5, 1959
Josh uses a recently released youth known as the Montana Kid to nab a gambler.
38	2	"The Healing Woman"	Donald McDougall	Story by : Charles Beaumont and Richard Matheson; Teleplay by : Charles Beaumont	September 12, 1959
Josh tries to rescue a sick child from a bad doctor.
39	3	"The Matchmaker"	Frank MacDonald	Fred Freiberger	September 19, 1959
Josh must find a bride for the "ugliest man in town". With Royal Dano.
40	4	"Breakout"	Thomas Carr	Richard H. Landau	September 26, 1959
Josh stages a jailbreak when he's hired to reclaim money.
41	5	"Estralita"	Donald McDougall	Ray Buffum	October 3, 1959
Josh learns that an angry mob is just as eager to capture a killer as he is. With Charles Aidman and Rita Lynn.
42	6	"The Hostage"	Donald McDougall	Don Brinkley	October 10, 1959
When Josh brings in a notorious killer (Lee Van Cleef), the outlaw takes the sheriff (Tyler McVey) hostage.
43	7	"The Empty Cell"	Thomas Carr	D.D. Beauchamp and Mary M. Beauchamp	October 17, 1959
Josh delivers a prisoner, only to have him and the sheriff mysteriously disappear. With Lon Chaney Jr. and DeForest Kelley.
44	8	"Bad Gun"	Thomas Carr	John Tomerlin	October 24, 1959
Josh pursues a man with a defective gun.
45	9	"The Tyrant"	Donald McDougall	Tom Gries	October 31, 1959
A cavalry deserter Josh is tracking is being held prisoner by the town marshal. With R.G. Armstrong.
46	10	"Reckless"	R.G. Springsteen	Robert Leslie Bellem	November 7, 1959
Tate Bradley hires Josh to find the man who killed Bradley's son in an argument over a girl. With Everett Sloane.
47	11	"Desert Seed"	Donald McDougall	Calvin Clements, Sr.	November 14, 1959
Josh tracks a fugitive who killed in self-defense. With Rafael Campos.
48	12	"Twelve Hours to Crazy Horse"	Thomas Carr	Cy Chermak	November 21, 1959
Josh escorts an accused murderer to trial, but the victim's brother intends to take justice into his own hands. With John Dehner.
49	13	"No Trail Back"	Donald McDougall	Peter Germano	November 28, 1959
One of the robbers Josh is after has been bitten by a rabid dog.
50	14	"Man on Horseback"	Donald McDougall	Paul Franklin	December 5, 1959
Josh follows an Apache (Jay Silverheels) who has been framed for shooting a man. Also with Jeanne Cooper, Fred Beir, James T. Chandler and Howard Negley.
51	15	"Chain Gang"	Thomas Carr	Robert Leslie Bellem	December 12, 1959
Josh must escape from a chain gang when he's arrested on a false charge.
52	16	"Vanishing Act"	Donald McDougall	John Tomerlin	December 26, 1959
A magician distracts townspeople while robbing banks.
53	17	"Mental Lapse"	Thomas Carr	Story by : William F. Nolan; Teleplay by : John Tomerlin	January 2, 1960
Josh attempts to help an amnesiac (Harry Townes) remember who he is. Also with Jan Shepard, Ed Prentiss, Paul Dubov and John Parrish.
54	18	"Angela"	George Blair	Tom Gries	January 9, 1960
Angela Prior (Fay Spain) is determined to see the man (Richard Bakalyan) who murdered her father hang. Also with Joe Patridge, Howard Petrie, Warren Oates and Wayne Rogers.
55	19	"The Monster"	Thomas Carr	Don Brinkley	January 16, 1960
An elephant trainer (Martin Landau) uses one of his elephants to scare people from their villages and rob them. Also with Bek Nelson, Eugene Martin, Ned Glass, Russell Thorson and William Fawcett.
56	20	"The Most Beautiful Woman"	Arthur D. Hilton	George Greedy	January 23, 1960
Josh is hired by a man (Arthur Franz) wanting to find a woman believed to be dead. Townspeople where she was last seen try to discourage him from finding the truth. Also with Mort Mills, Gordon L. Polk and Owen Bush.
57	21	"Jason"	George Blair	Story by : John Robinson; Teleplay by : D.D. Beauchamp and Mary M. Beauchamp	January 30, 1960
Josh becomes suspicious of Jason Nichols when the deputy begs to join his hunt for a desperado. With Wright King.
58	22	"The Partners"	George Blair	D.D. Beauchamp and Mary M. Beauchamp	February 6, 1960
Jason proposes that he and Josh become partners. With Wright King.
59	23	"Tolliver Bender"	George Blair	Eric Norden^{[A]}	February 13, 1960
Josh and Jason (Wright King) rescue Tolliver Bender (Douglas Fowley) from the gallows so he can testify at a trial, but the citizens want a hostage to ensure his return. Also with Gloria Talbot and John Carradine.
60	24	"A House Divided"	George Blair	D.D. Beauchamp and Mary M. Beauchamp	February 20, 1960
Josh becomes a target for assassination as he tries to intervene in a family feud. With Wright King.
61	25	"Triple Vise"	George Blair	Fred Freiberger	February 27, 1960
Josh and Jason (Wright King) trail a killer to Mexico, where Josh gets a new perspective, thanks to a barmaid.
62	26	"Black Belt"	George Blair	John Tomerlin	March 19, 1960
Josh and Jason are hired to bring in a black-belt accused of murder, unaware that their employer is the real killer. With Wright King.
63	27	"The Pariah"	George Blair	Fred Freiberger	March 26, 1960
Josh agrees to keep an eye on his friend's son, Randy Holleran, who is a pariah for deliberately withholding the town's medical supplies. With Susan Oliver.
64	28	"Vendetta"	George Blair	Samuel Newman	April 9, 1960
Josh captures an army recruit whose mission is to start a war with the Indians. With Harry Townes.
65	29	"Death Divided by Three"	George Blair	Don Brinkley	April 23, 1960
Josh tracks a fugitive who is also being sought by his wife.
66	30	"The Inheritance"	Arthur D. Hilton	George W. George	April 30, 1960
Josh is tasked with bringing home a dying man's runaway son. With John Litel, Edward Kemmer, Don Kennedy, John Anderson, Maxine Cooper, Thomas B. Henry and George Eldredge.
67	31	"Prison Trail"	Thomas Carr	D.D. Beauchamp	May 14, 1960
Josh and Jason are escorting four prisoners to jail when one of them is frightened by a stranger. With Wright King.
68	32	"Pay-Off at Pinto"	Donald McDougall	Wells Root	May 21, 1960
The citizens of Pinto panic when the bank is robbed, so the bank owner enlists Josh to capture the robbers. With Philip Ahn.

=== Season 3 (1960–1961) ===
No. overall	No. in season	Title	Directed by	Written by	Original release date
69	1	"The Trial"	Harry Harris Jr.	Ed Adamson	September 21, 1960
Josh is hired to bring in a former Union officer, but learns it is all part of an illegal mock trial staged by the officer's former soldiers. With James Coburn.
70	2	"The Cure"	Gene Reynolds	Ed Adamson	September 28, 1960
A woman hires Josh to sober the town drunk so she can marry him.
71	3	"Journey for Josh"	Harry Harris Jr.	Ed Adamson	October 5, 1960
Josh falls for the female robber he is escorting to prison.
72	4	"The Looters"	Harry Harris Jr.	Norman Katkov	October 12, 1960
Josh tracks desperados who broke out of prison during a tornado.
73	5	"The Twain Shall Meet"	Richard Donner	Norman Katkov	October 19, 1960
A writer from Boston joins Josh on his manhunt to get an exclusive story. With Mary Tyler Moore.
74	6	"The Showdown"	Murray Golden	Ed Adamson	October 26, 1960
Josh is forced into a showdown with an old friend who swears he is innocent.
75	7	"Surprise Witness"	Murray Golden	Ed Adamson	November 2, 1960
The townspeople refuse to tell Josh who murdered his friend, until a surprise witness comes forward.
76	8	"To the Victor"	Murray Golden	Ed Adamson	November 9, 1960
Josh is asked by the town's men to help stop a revolt by the town's women, who insist all the men put away their guns. With Suzanne Storrs, Frank Albertson, George Ramsey, Nacho Galindo, Olan Soule, Hal K. Dawson, Jan Stine, Diana Crawford, Susan Crane, Dick Farnsworth and Vince Deadrick.
77	9	"Criss-Cross"	Murray Golden	Norman Katkov	November 16, 1960
Josh brings in his captive (Mark Rydell), only to learn from the sheriff (Robert Nash) he has the wrong man. Another man (John Craven) admits to the crime, so Josh goes after him. Also with Vaughn Taylor, Patricia King and Guy Wilkerson.
78	10	"The Medicine Man"	R.D. Donner^{[B]}	Norman Katkov	November 23, 1960
A medicine man (J. Pat O'Malley) and Josh get involved in the aftermath of a bank robbery. The banker (Ted DeCorsia) says it was a bank teller (John Baer) new to town, but the banker's wife (Cloris Leachman) thinks the teller is innocent. Also with Richard Bartell, Ben Morris, James Parnell and Ric Applewhite.
79	11	"One Mother Too Many"	Harry Harris Jr.	Norman Katkov	November 7, 1960
Fearing she will lose custody of her son, a widow proposes to Josh in an attempt to acquire a new father for him.
80	12	"The Choice"	Harry Harris Jr.	Norman Katkov	December 14, 1960
A bounty hunter named Frank Koster is after the man who bested him in a gunfight. With Dick Foran, Maxine Stuart, Burt Douglas, Barbara Hines and Chuck Hayward.
81	13	"Three for One"	Murray Golden	Norman Katkov	December 21, 1960
The friends of the prisoner Josh brought in kidnap the sheriff and threaten to kill a person a day until their leader is released.
82	14	"Witch Woman"	Harry Harris Jr.	Norman Katkov	December 28, 1960
Josh is hired to keep a voodoo doctor away from a man's pregnant wife.
83	15	"Baa-Baa"	Harry Harris Jr.	Norman Katkov	January 4, 1961
Josh is hired by George Goode to find Mrs. Goode's pet ewe.
84	16	"The Last Retreat"	Richard D. Donner^{[B]}	Norman Katkov	January 11, 1961
Josh must protect a woman when the killer her testimony put in prison escapes. With Constance Ford and Warren Oates.
85	17	"Bounty on Josh"	Richard D. Donner^{[B]}	Ed Adamson	January 25, 1961
A gunman stalks Josh in a small town.
86	18	"Hero in the Dust"	Harry Harris Jr.	Norman Katkov	February 1, 1961
Harry Weaver hires Josh to bring in his twin brother, a fugitive wanted for murder.
87	19	"Epitaph"	Harry Harris Jr.	Norman Katkov	February 8, 1961
Josh goes after his friend Jim Kramer, a lawman who has been seduced by his girlfriend into robbing a bank. With Richard Anderson.
88	20	"The Voice of Silence"	Richard D. Donner^{[B]}	Ed Adamson	February 15, 1961
Frank Hagen asks Josh to look after his deaf-mute daughter Carol while he serves time in jail.
89	21	"El Gato"	Murray Golden	Ed Adamson	February 22, 1961
Josh tracks down a bandit known as El Gato. With Noah Beery Jr.
90	22	"Detour"	Murray Golden	Norman Katkov	March 1, 1961
Clayton Armstrong (Howard Morris) wishes to elope with Jane Fairweather (Jan Brooks), but he's afraid of her father (Howard Smith), so he turns to Josh for help. Also with Melinda Plowman, Byron Foulger and Jacquelyne Park.
91	23	"Monday Morning"	Murray Golden	Ed Adamson	March 8, 1961
A thief decides to return the loot he stole, but fears what his partners will do when they find it missing.
92	24	"The Long Search"	Murray Golden	Norman Katkov	March 15, 1961
A geisha, Linda Wong, asks Josh to help find the man (Robert Kenneally) who promised to marry her. Also with Lynn Bernay, Dale Ishimoto, William Eben Stephens, Stanley Clements and Olan Soule.
93	25	"Dead Reckoning"	Murray Golden	Ed Adamson	March 22, 1961
A woman asks Josh to bring her husband back alive so he can prove he killed one of the Taggart boys in self-defense, but the brothers of the deceased are out for revenge.
94	26	"Barney's Bounty"	Richard D. Donner^{[B]}	Sumner Arthur Long and Ed Adamson	March 29, 1961
Josh helps his friend Barney Durant track down a pair of horse thieves. With Noah Beery Jr.

== Notes ==
1. Eric Norden was unbilled for writing the episode "Tolliver Bender".
2. Richard Donner was alternately credited for directing episodes.
