= Aaron M. Kohn =

Crime investigator and FBI agent

Aaron M. Kohn was a crime investigator and FBI agent.

== Biography ==
Kohn was born to Lithuanian Jewish immigrants in Philadelphia, 1910, both parents worked in a suspenders factory where they met. He was raised an Orthodox Jew and left high school in 1928, going on to join the FBI which he served in until 1939. He subsequently became an attorney and the regional director of the American Cancer Society in Philadelphia.

After the murder of committeeman Charles Gross in 1952, the Chicago City Council hired Kohn to work for the Chicago Crime Commission. He completed a ten-month study of corruption in the Chicago police. In 1954 he went to New Orleans, Louisiana where he became director of the New Orleans Crime Commission, a private venture funded by public donations. He held that position until 1978.

As director Kohn's main concern was the investigation and raising awareness of the activities of the New Orleans crime family and its boss Carlos Marcello. Kohn stated that "no other syndicate leader in the country can match the power and immunity that Carlos Marcello has won through outright corruption". He contrasted what he had observed in Chicago with what he witnessed in New Orleans:

After about a year, I began to realize something about the system down here. In Chicago, people were generally on one side of the fence or the other—honest or crooked. But in Louisiana, there just isn't any fence."

To Kohn's own dismay the FBI in Louisiana assured him that Marcello was merely a tomato salesman. Kohn's work was not without its dangers, one day he went out to fetch the Sunday morning paper when upon opening it he found a dead rabbit with its throat slit inside.

He portrayed himself in the 1957 film Damn Citizen. Kohn testified before US Congress on many occasions throughout the decades. He assisted the McClellan Committee and testified before it in 1959. He was summoned to Washington by the committee's Chief Counsel Bobby Kennedy to brief him on Marcello's activity. Later in May 1972 he testified before the House Select Committee on Crime. He served on the US Chamber of Commerce's Advisory Panel on Crime Prevention and Control regarding the Organized Crime Control Bill (passed 1970).

Kohn believed that Marcello had a role in the assassination of John F. Kennedy. However he was nonetheless critical of New Orleans District Attorney Jim Garrison's investigation into the assassination. He testified for the defense before a grand jury at the trial of Clay Shaw, suggesting that Louisiana Attorney General, Jack Gremillion, should investigate Garrison's investigation. However Gremillion refused to do so, insisting that it was a matter for the courts and that Garrison should be allowed to try his case. After Shaw was acquitted Kohn stated that due to "various crimes" committed by "Garrison and members of his staff" his crime commission was considering taking action.

He appeared in a 1988 episode of The Kwitny Report, discussing the American mafia and Kennedy's assassination.

Kohn died on 3 May 1989 aged 78 at Touro Infirmary Hospital in New Orleans.
