= Margaret Hayes =

American actress (1913–1977)

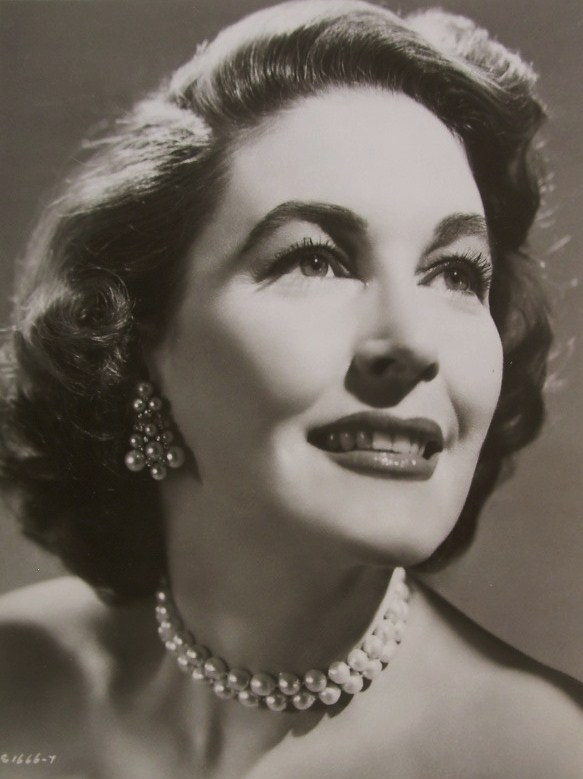
- In Blackboard Jungle (1955)
- Born: Florette Regina Ottenheimer; December 5, 1913; Baltimore, Maryland, U.S.
- Died: January 26, 1977 (aged 63); Miami Beach, Florida, U.S.
- Education: Johns Hopkins University
- Occupation: Actress
- Years active: 1939–1964
- Spouses: Charles DeBuskey (m. 1937; div. 1939); Leif Erickson (m. 1942; div. 1942) Herbert B. Swope Jr. (m. 1947; div. 1973)
- Children: 3

Margaret Hayes (born Florette Regina Ottenheimer; December 5, 1913 – January 26, 1977) was an American film, stage, and television actress.

== Early years ==
A native of Baltimore, Maryland, Hayes was one of four children born to Clara Bussey and Jacob Lewis "Jack" Ottenheimer, erstwhile songwriter, joke-book writer, radio performer turned real estate broker, who had, at one time, reportedly provided much of the material for the famous magician, Howard Thurston.

While a student at Forest Park High School, she joined the Emerson Cook Stock Company to gain more acting experience. She entered Johns Hopkins University to become a nurse, but stuck to her dramatic ambitions. At the school, she joined "The Barnstormers", a theatrical organization, becoming the first female member of that group.

=== Changing names ===
Using the name "Dana Dale" (reportedly at the suggestion of columnist Walter Winchell), Hayes found work as a model, "featured in the best cigarette, auto, and fashion advertisements". Her screen test for the role of Scarlett O'Hara in Gone with the Wind was unsuccessful, but she received a movie contract anyway. Publicists at her studio recommended "Dana Edwards" as a better name for movies, so she began using it. Eventually, she changed to Margaret Hayes for public purposes, and was called Maggie by her friends.

== Film ==
Hayes' initial contract was with Warner Bros. Having little success there, she signed with Paramount Pictures.

Hayes was often billed as Maggie Hayes in her film credits. She is perhaps best known for her performance as schoolteacher Lois Judby Hammond in the 1955 film Blackboard Jungle. In 1956, she guest-starred as Dora Hand in three episodes of The Life and Legend of Wyatt Earp. She appeared in the episode "The San Saba Incident" (October 18, 1957) of Trackdown, playing a female convict, named Abby Lindon.

Hayes' films included The Glass Key, Sullivan's Travels, and Good Day for a Hanging. In 1958, in the film Damn Citizen, Hayes appeared opposite Keith Andes in the role of a real person, Dorothy Maguire Grevemberg, the wife of the crusading Louisiana State Police superintendent Francis Grevemberg. She made four guest appearances on CBS's Perry Mason, including as defendant Sybil Granger in 1957 episode "The Case of the Nervous Accomplice". She co-starred on Tombstone Territory season 1 episode 24 'Cave-In' which aired March 26, 1958. In 1961, she portrayed Mrs. North in the episode "Incident of the Night on the Town" on CBS"s Rawhide. In the same year, she also guest-starred in an episode of Bonanza, "The Countess", as Lady Linda Chadwick.

== Journalism ==
After marrying Herbert Bayard Swope in 1947, Hayes temporarily retired from acting and turned to journalism, eventually becoming assistant fashion editor for Life.

== Radio ==
In her later years, Hayes lived in Palm Beach, Florida, and was the host of a daily radio talk show on WPBR.

== Personal life ==
Hayes had her first child, a daughter Nan (born 1937), from her brief first marriage to Charles DeBuskey. The couple divorced in 1939, and Hayes subsequently married actor Leif Erickson on June 12, 1942, eloping with him to Minden, Nevada. They separated 28 days later, and Hayes received a divorce on October 2, 1942. In 1947 she married a third time, to producer Herbert B. Swope, Jr. (son of three-time winner of the Pulitzer Prize for Reporting, journalist Herbert Swope), with whom she had a daughter, actress Tracy Brooks Swope, and a son, Herbert Swope III. They divorced in 1973.

== Death ==
On January 26, 1977, aged 63, Hayes died of cancer in Mount Sinai Medical Center in Miami Beach, Florida.

== Partial filmography ==
- The Man Who Talked Too Much (1940) as Governor's Secretary
- Ladies Must Live (1940) as Chorus Girl
- Money and the Woman (1940) as Depositor (uncredited)
- City for Conquest (1940) as Sally, Irene's Friend (uncredited)
- Tugboat Annie Sails Again (1940) as Rosie
- In Old Colorado (1941) as Myra Woods
- Henry Aldrich for President (1941) as Miss Patterson (uncredited)
- New York Town (1941) as Lola Martin (uncredited)
- Skylark (1941) as Blake's Receptionist (uncredited)
- The Night of January 16th (1941) as Nancy Wakefield
- Sullivan's Travels (1941) as Secretary
- Louisiana Purchase (1941) as Louisiana Belle
- The Lady Has Plans (1942) as Rita Lenox
- Saboteur (1942) as Henry's Wife in Movie (uncredited)
- Take a Letter, Darling (1942) as Sally French
- The Glass Key (1942) as Eloise Matthews
- Scattergood Survives a Murder (1943) as Gail Barclay
- Stand By All Networks (1942) as Lela Cramer
- One Dangerous Night (1943) as Patricia Blake Shannon
- They Got Me Covered (1943) as Lucille
- Blackboard Jungle (1955) as Lois Judby Hammond
- Violent Saturday (1955) as Mrs. Emily Fairchild
- The Bottom of the Bottle (1956) as Lil Breckinridge
- From the Desk of Margaret Tyding (1956)
- Omar Khayyam (1957) as Queen Zarada
- Damn Citizen (1958) as Dorothy Grevemberg
- The Case Against Brooklyn (1958) as Lil Polombo née Alexander
- Girl in the Woods (1958) as Bell Cory
- Fräulein (1958) as Lt. Berdie Dubbin
- Good Day for a Hanging (1959) as Ruth Granger
- The Beat Generation (1959) as Joyce Greenfield
- Girls Town (1959) as Mother Veronica
- 13 West Street (1962) as Mrs. Madeleine Landry
- House of Women (1962) as Zoe Stoughton

Flipper 1965 S1 Episodes 12 & 13 (Lady and the Dolphin) Congresswomen Helen Browning.

== Television ==
Year1960	Title Perry Mason "The Case of the Clumsey Clown" S4E17	Role Mrs. Gilbert	Notes
1957	Dick Powell's Zane Grey Theatre	Rose	S2:E01 "The Deserters"
1957	Perry Mason	Sybil Granger	S1E03 "The Case of the Nervous Accomplice"
1961	Rawhide	Mrs. North	S3:E29 "Incident of the Night on the Town"
1961	Bonanza	Lady Linda Chadwick	S3E09 "The Countess"
1960	Perry Mason	Vivaca Bell	S3:E24 "The Case of the Ominous Outcast"
1963	Perry Mason	Leslie Rankin	S7:E6 "The Case of the Reluctant Model"
