= Washington Township, Harrison County, Missouri =

Township in Harrison County, Missouri, U.S.

Washington Township
- Township
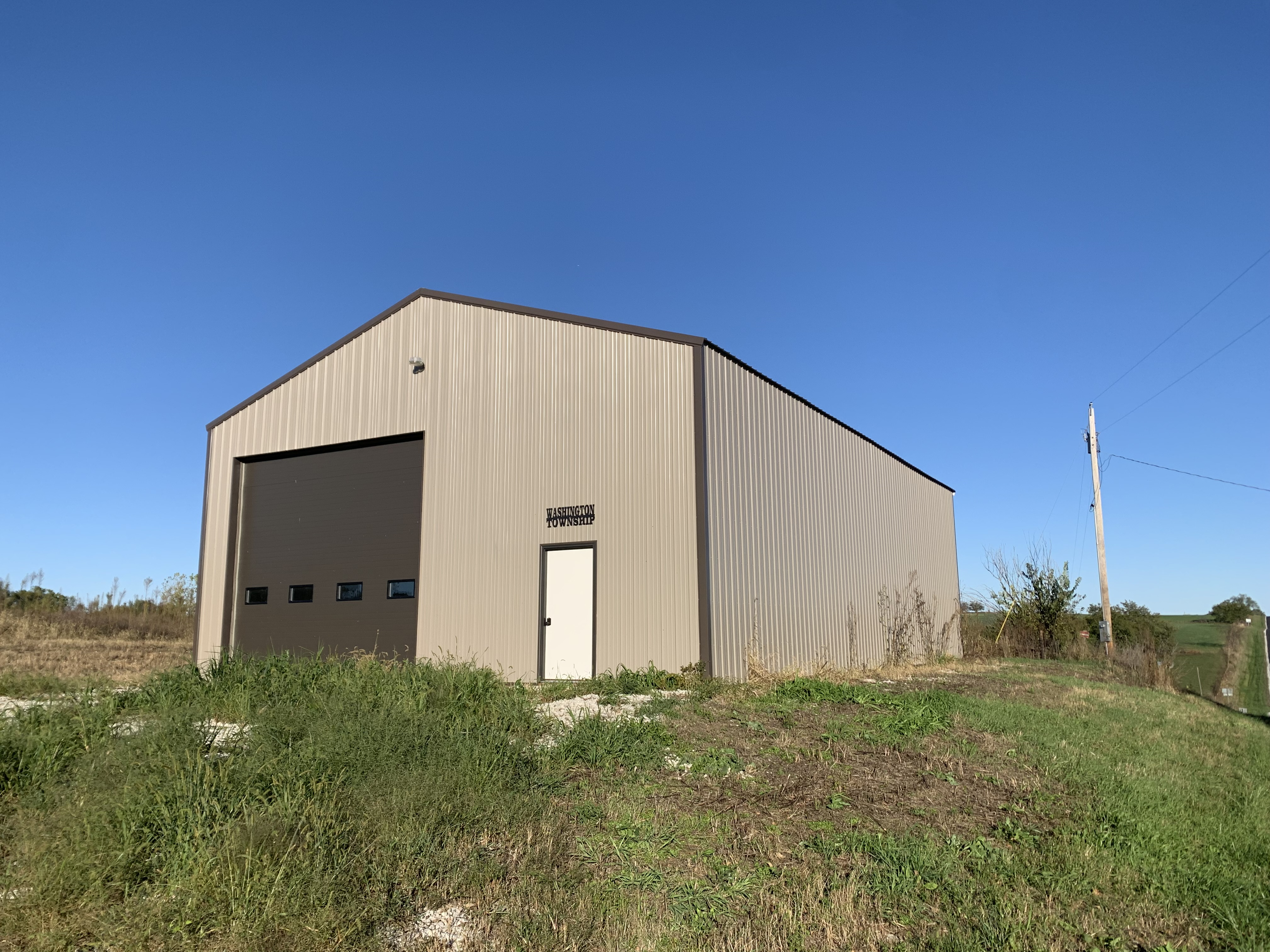
- Washington Township building at Washington Center

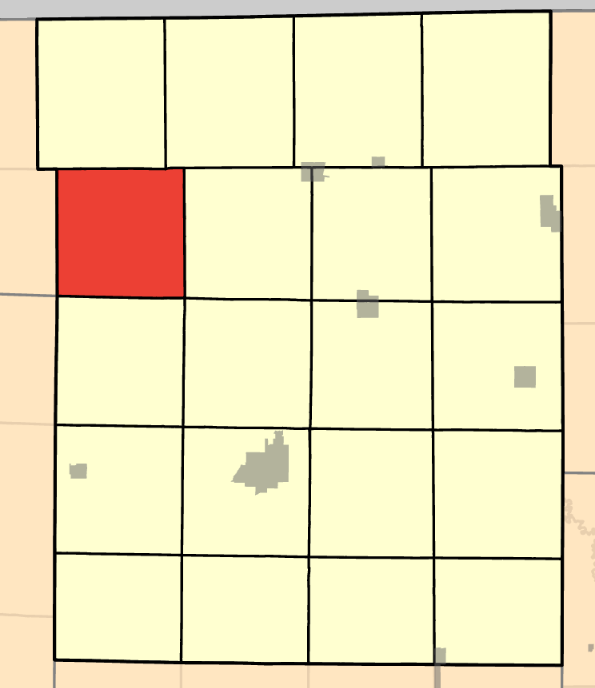
- Coordinates: 40°26′02″N 94°08′20″W
- Country: United States
- State: Missouri
- County: Harrison

Area
  - Total: 36.08 sq mi (93.4 km^{2})
  - Land: 35.88 sq mi (92.9 km^{2})
  - Water: 0.2 sq mi (0.52 km^{2}) 0.55%
- Elevation: 1,050 ft (320 m)

Population (2020)
  - Total: 101
  - Density: 2.8/sq mi (1.1/km^{2})
- FIPS code: 29-08177488
- GNIS feature ID: 766731

Washington Township is a township in Harrison County, Missouri, United States. At the 2020 census, its population was 101.

Washington Township was established in March, 1856 and the name is likely derived similar to that of Washington Center.
