= Washington Center, Missouri =

Extinct hamlet in Missouri, U.S.

Coordinates: 40°25′37″N 94°09′25″W

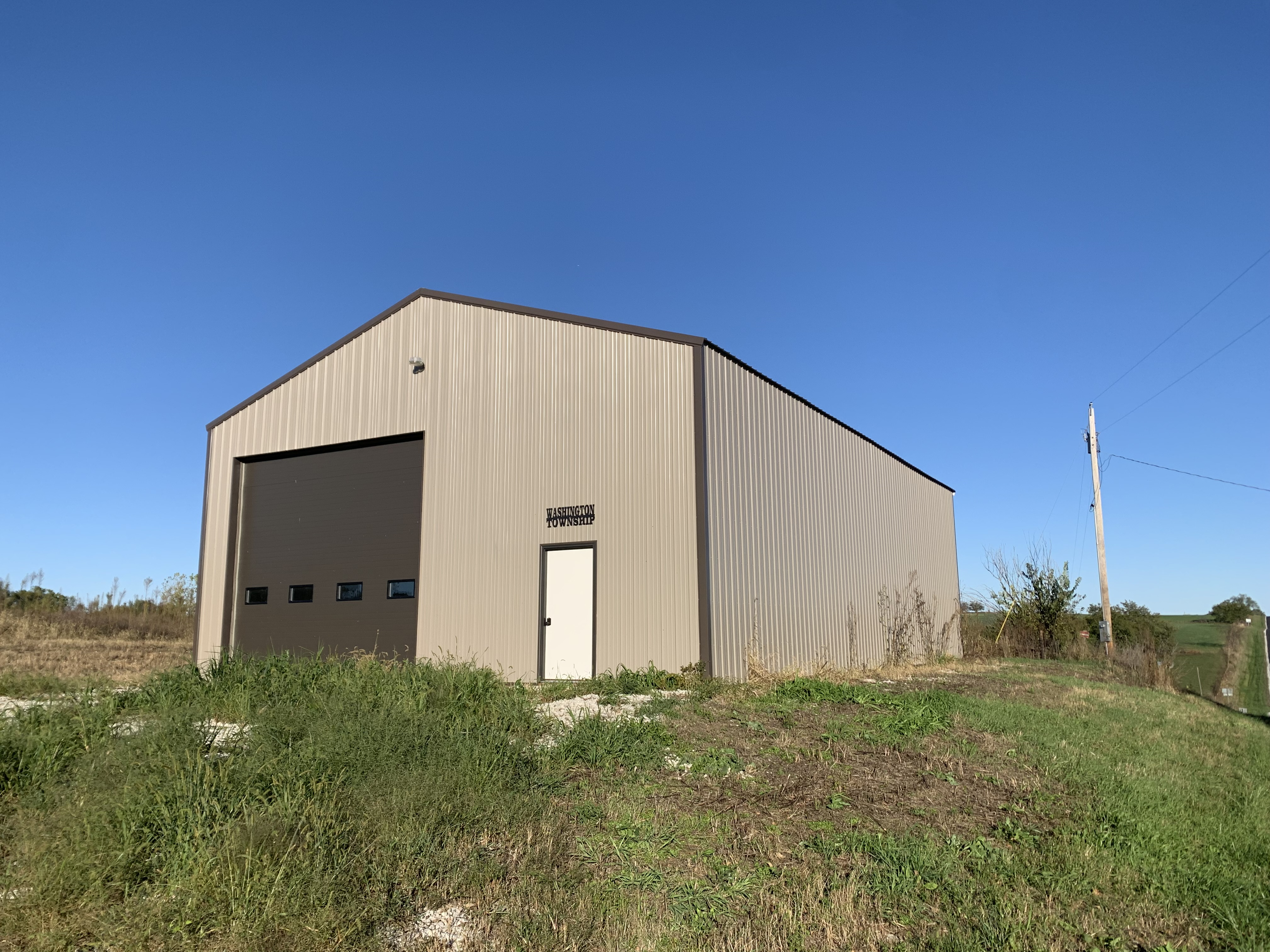
Washington Township building at Washington Center

Washington Center is an unincorporated community in west central Harrison County, in the U.S. state of Missouri.

The community is located at the intersection of Missouri routes M and D approximately 5.5 miles north of Martinsville. Big Muddy Creek flows past one mile to the west of the community.

== History ==
A post office called Washington Centre was established in 1878, and remained in operation until 1904. The community lies near the center of Washington Township, hence the name.
