= Ellenorah, Missouri =

Extinct hamlet in Missouri, U.S.

Coordinates: 40°20′19″N 94°19′55″W

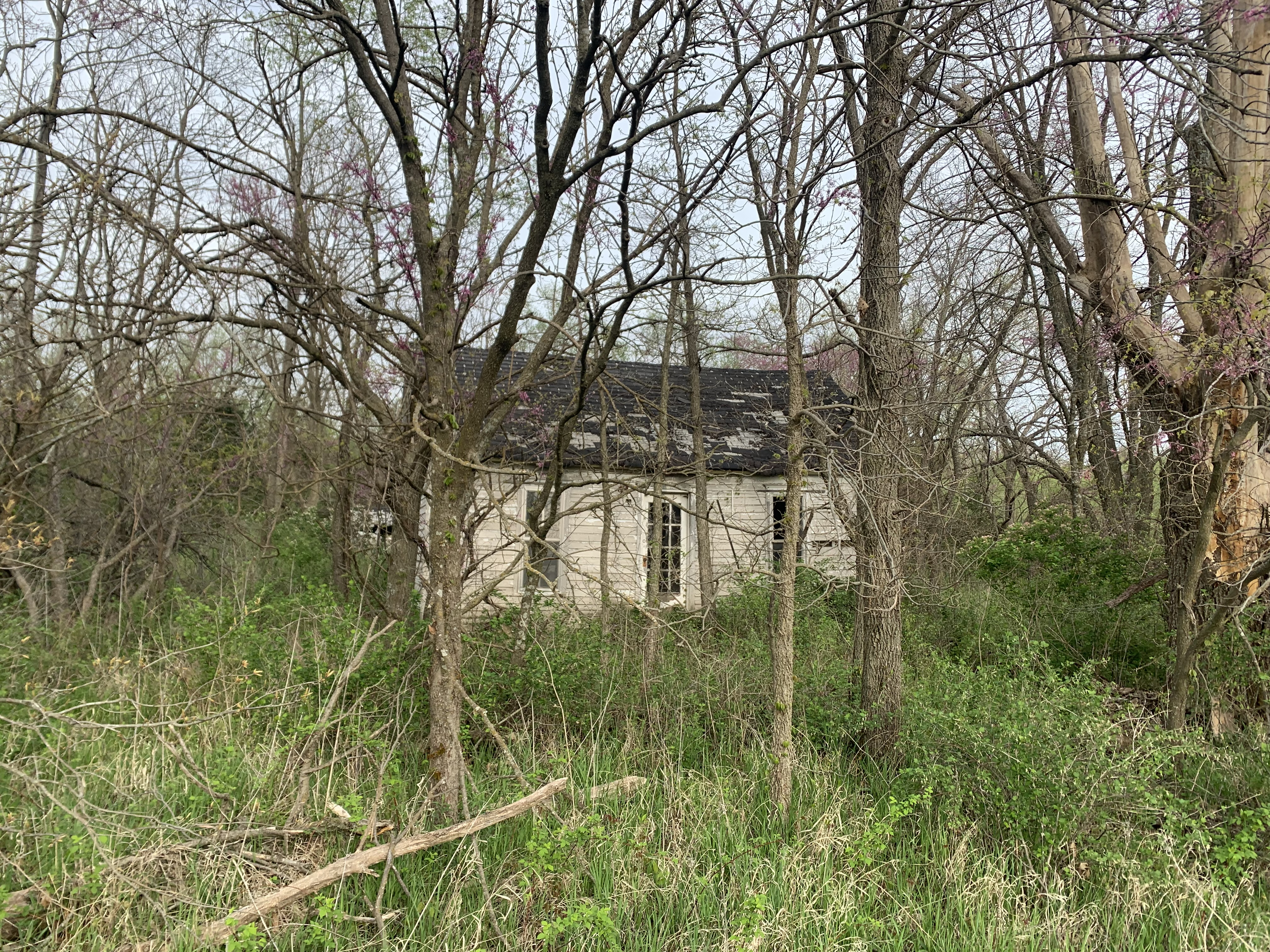
Abandoned Building near Ellenorah, Missouri

Ellenorah is an extinct hamlet in Gentry County, in the U.S. state of Missouri. The GNIS classifies it as a populated place.

The community was located on the East Fork of the Grand River approximately six miles north of Albany. Big Muddy Creek enters the East Fork one-half mile west of the community.

A post office called Ellenorah was established in 1865, and remained in operation until 1898. The community's name is an amalgamation of the first names of a settler's two daughters. An early variant name was "Gay's Mill", after Jesse Gay, proprietor of a saw and gristmill.
