= Big Muddy Creek (East Fork Grand River tributary) =

Stream in the U.S. state of Missouri

Coordinates: 40°20′15″N 94°20′38″W

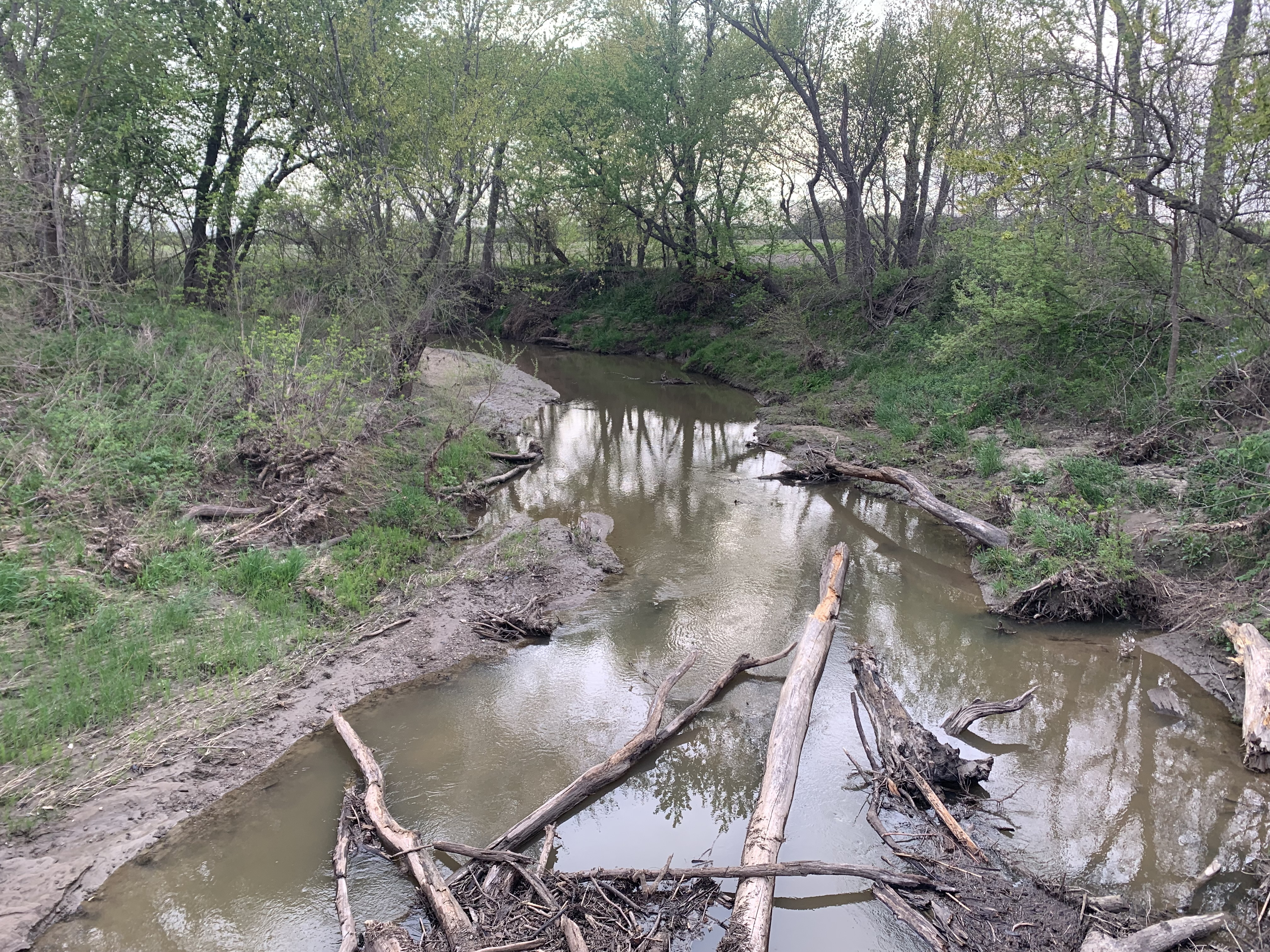
Big Muddy Creek on Denver Trail bridge in Howard Township

Big Muddy Creek is a stream in Harrison and Gentry counties of northwestern Missouri. It is a tributary of the East Fork of the Grand River.

The stream headwaters arise at with the confluence of the East and West forks at an elevation of approximately 302 m (991 ft). The stream flows to the southeast passing one mile west of the community of Washington Center then enters the northeast corner of Gentry County where it passes just south of Siloam Springs. The stream flows to the west for about three miles then turns south-southwest to its confluence with the East Fork of the Grand River just west of the community of Ellenorah at and an elevation of 266 m (873 ft).
