= Len Sowards =

American film actor

- Sowards in 1937
- Born: James Leonard Sowards; October 17, 1892; Missouri, U.S.
- Died: August 20, 1962 (aged 69); Sawtelle, California, U.S.
- Occupations: Film and television actor
- Relatives: George Sowards (brother)

James Leonard Sowards (October 17, 1892 – August 20, 1962) was an American film actor.

== Life and career ==
Sowards was born in Missouri. He was the brother of George Sowards, an actor. He served in the United States Navy during World War I. He began his screen career in 1922, appearing in the silent western film Step on It!. In 1925, he appeared in the film Red Blood, playing Broom.

Later in his career, Sowards appeared in numerous films such as Tenting Tonight on the Old Camp Ground, Powdersmoke Range, North of the Border, Partners in Time, Springtime in Texas, The Gay Buckaroo, Sunset Range, The Local Bad Man, Badman's Territory, The Cherokee Strip, King of the Bullwhip and Gunslingers.

Sowards retired from acting in 1959, last appearing in the film Good Day for a Hanging.

== Death ==
Sowards died on August 20, 1962, in Sawtelle, California, at the age of 69.
