= Whispering Smith (TV series) =

American Western television series

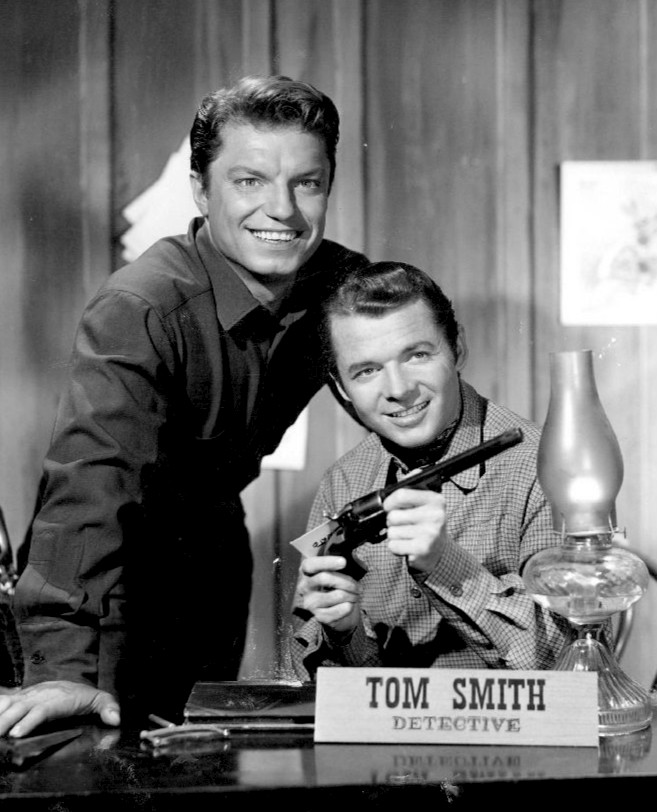
- Guy Mitchell (left) and Audie Murphy in the series
- Genre: Western
- Based on: Whispering Smith by Frank H. Spearman
- Written by: Lawrence Menkin; Tom Seller
- Directed by: Herbert Coleman; Edward Ludlum; Pete Lyons; Christian Nyby
- Starring: Audie Murphy; Guy Mitchell; Sam Buffington
- Theme music composer: Richard Shores
- Country of origin: United States
- Original language: English
- No. of seasons: 1
- No. of episodes: 26

Production
- Producers: Herbert Coleman; Richard Lewis; Joseph Hoffman
- Running time: 30 minutes
- Production company: Whispering Co. Productions Revue Studios

Original release
- Network: NBC
- Release: May 8 – October 30, 1961

Whispering Smith is an American Western television series that originally aired on NBC. It has the same ultimate source material as the 1948 film of the same name (and some other films), but differs in some significant respects.

In the series, Audie Murphy stars as Tom "Whispering" Smith, a 19th-century police detective in Denver, Colorado. Filming of the series began in 1959, but the program did not air until May 8, 1961, because of unexpected production problems.

Whispering Smith combines elements of CBS's Have Gun – Will Travel starring Richard Boone, NBC's Tales of Wells Fargo starring Dale Robertson, the syndicated Shotgun Slade with Scott Brady, and ABC's The Man from Blackhawk, a Stirling Silliphant production starring Robert Rockwell.

== Program background ==
The 1948 film was about a railroad policeman named Luke "Whispering" Smith in frontier-era Wyoming, pursuing a gang of train robbers loosely modeled on the Hole in the Wall Gang. It was based on a novel by Frank H. Spearman.

The character in the novel and the subsequent film combined elements of real-life railroad detectives Joe Lefors, who was employed by the Burlington line, and Timothy Keliher of the Union Pacific. By contrast, the character on the TV series, whose first name is slightly different, does not seem based on any real-life figure, and neither are the other characters. The series is clearly set sometime after 1874. when Denver's local law enforcement agency transitioned from a town marshal's office to a city police force. Some episodes of the show were said to be based on actual cases from the files of the Denver Police Department.

In the 1948 film Whispering Smith, Alan Ladd starred as the no-nonsense railroad investigator assigned to solve the mystery of a rash of train robberies. He sadly finds that the perpetrator of the crimes is an old friend, Murray Sinclaire, portrayed by Robert Preston. The 1948 film was not the first motion picture to have been based on Spearman's railroad detective. In fact, there were three silent films based on Spearman's novel, in 1916, 1926, and 1927. A sound picture set in modern times, Whispering Smith Speaks, was released in 1935, though, in that film, the titular character was a railroad track walker rather than a detective, who solves a crime on the side. In the first of the silent films, Harold Lloyd served as an assistant director, while the director, J. P. McGowan, also played the lead. In 1951, the film, Whispering Smith Hits London, also set in modern times, starred Richard Carlson as an American detective working on a special case at Scotland Yard in England.

== Controversy and Conclusion ==
After seven episodes of the series were filmed, co-star Guy Mitchell, a recording artist who portrayed detective George Romack, broke his shoulder in a fall from a horse. By the time he recovered, Murphy had a film commitment (Hell Bent for Leather, shot August 17 – September 11, 1959) and production had to be further postponed. Actor Sam Buffington, costarring as police chief John Richards, committed suicide at the age of twenty-eight; the character was never replaced. Once scheduled, the series missed its intended debut date because of an NBC news special. After the premiere of Whispering Smith, the U.S. Senate Juvenile Delinquency subcommittee claimed that the series was excessively violent, and Murphy rushed to its defense.

A hearing before the subcommittee made the front page of The New York Times on June 9, 1961. With the lights dimmed in their meeting room, members of the subcommittee watched the second episode, "The Grudge". They saw a story of bloody revenge that included the following: a fistfight, a mother horsewhipping her son, a claim of sexual assault (fabricated) in a hotel room, a story told of a man laughing after shooting another man six times in the stomach, a gunfight ending in injury, and the same mother, at the end, accidentally shooting and killing her daughter instead of the target (Smith/Murphy). The story was set in Denver, Colorado and when the lights came up Senator John A. Carroll of Colorado called the episode "a libel on Denver". An executive producer for Revue Studios defended the program before skeptical senators. The committee staff estimated that 2,500,000 children had watched "The Grudge". The program was soon discontinued, as Murphy himself lost interest in the project.

Twenty Whispering Smith episodes aired through September 18, 1961, in the time slot following Tales of Wells Fargo. The remaining six segments were never broadcast on NBC. Whispering Smith aired at 9 p.m. Mondays opposite the CBS sitcom The Danny Thomas Show and the second half of the ABC modern detective series Surfside 6.

The budget was $45,000 an episode.

== Cast ==
- Audie Murphy as Tom "Whispering" Smith
- Guy Mitchell as George Romack
- Sam Buffington as John Richards

== Notable guests ==
Among current and future stars who appeared on Whispering Smith were

- Robert Redford and Gloria Talbott as Johnny and Cora Gates in "The Grudge", the second episode of the series
- Harry Carey, Jr. as Sergeant Stringer in "Safety Valve"
- Richard Chamberlain as Chris Harrington in "Stain of Justice"
- James Best in starring role in "The Hemp Reeger Case"
- Edward Platt in "The Hemp Reeger Case"
- Roscoe Ates (1895–1962), formerly of the 1950 western The Marshal of Gunsight Pass, as a sheriff in the episode entitled "Three for One"
- Clu Gulager, later co-star of The Tall Man and The Virginian, as Jeff Whalen in "The Devil's Share"
- Myron Healey as Jim Conley in "Double Edge"
- Don Keefer as Dr. Johnson in "The Deadliest Weapon"
- Read Morgan as Hob Tyler in "The Jodie Tyler Story"
- Forrest Tucker, later star of the western sitcom F Troop, as Gunman Bardot in "Trademark"
- Elen Willard, as Charlotte Laughlin in "The Quest"
- Alan Hale Jr., who starred in the western series Casey Jones, and later in the sitcom Gilligan's Island, appeared in the series finale, "The Idol", as Ole Brindessen, the witness to a swindler who commits murder
- Jim Davis of Dallas fame appears in "Homeless Wind"

== Episodes ==
No.	Title	Original release date
1	"The Blind Gun"	May 8, 1961
A blinded outlaw leads Smith in a search for stolen bank money.
2	"The Grudge"	May 15, 1961
Ma Gates, an outlaw's widow (June Walker), plans to have her son (Robert Redford) murder Smith. (Gloria Talbott) plays the daughter.
3	"The Devil's Share"	May 21, 1961
A loaf of bread ends up leading to the capture of a murderer (Clu Gulager).
4	"Stake-Out"	May 29, 1961
Smith is being blackmailed by a pair of old friends who turn out to be outlaws planning a bank robbery.
5	"Safety Valve"	June 5, 1961
Smith and Romack investigate the death of officers who've been shot in the back during battle.
6	"Stain of Justice"	June 12, 1961
The son (Richard Chamberlain) is suspected of a killing that he didn't commit.
7	"The Deadliest Weapon"	June 19, 1961
A ruthless tycoon seeks police protection when his life is threatened on the eve of a gold-mine stock sale.
8	"The Quest"	June 26, 1961
A blind pianist provides the only clue to the whereabouts of a missing woman.
9	"Three for One"	July 3, 1961
An outlaw gang kidnaps a prisoner in order to determine the location of stolen money.
10	"Death at Even Money"	July 10, 1961
A gambler bets $50,000 that Smith won't live another 48 hours.
11	"The Hemp Reeger Case"	July 17, 1961
12	"This Mortal Coil"	July 24, 1961
13	"Cross Cut"	July 31, 1961
14	"Double Edge"	August 7, 1961
15	"Trademark"	August 14, 1961
16	"The Jodie Tyler Story"	August 21, 1961
17	"Poet and Peasant Case"	August 28, 1961
Written by Robert Bloch
18	"Dark Circle"	September 4, 1961
19	"Swift Justice"	September 11, 1961
20	"The Idol"	September 18, 1961
A barman overhears a murder linked to a fraud
21	"String of Circumstances"	September 25, 1961
22	"The Interpreter"	October 2, 1961
23	"The Homeless Wind"	October 9, 1961
While taking in a prisoner who was an old friend of his father both men are captured by 'El Tigre'.
24	"Trial of the Avengers"	October 16, 1961
25	"Prayer of a Chance"	October 23, 1961
26	"Hired to Die"	October 30, 1961

== DVD release ==
Timeless Media Group released 25 episodes of this series in a 3-disc Region 1 set on April 20, 2010. A bonus feature, Medal of Honor: The Audie Murphy Story, is included.

On October 20, 2011, it was announced that Timeless Media had located the missing episode, "The Interpreter", which was not present in the previously released set, and would now re-issue the third disc of that set to include this missing episode.
