= Step on It! (1922 film) =

1922 film

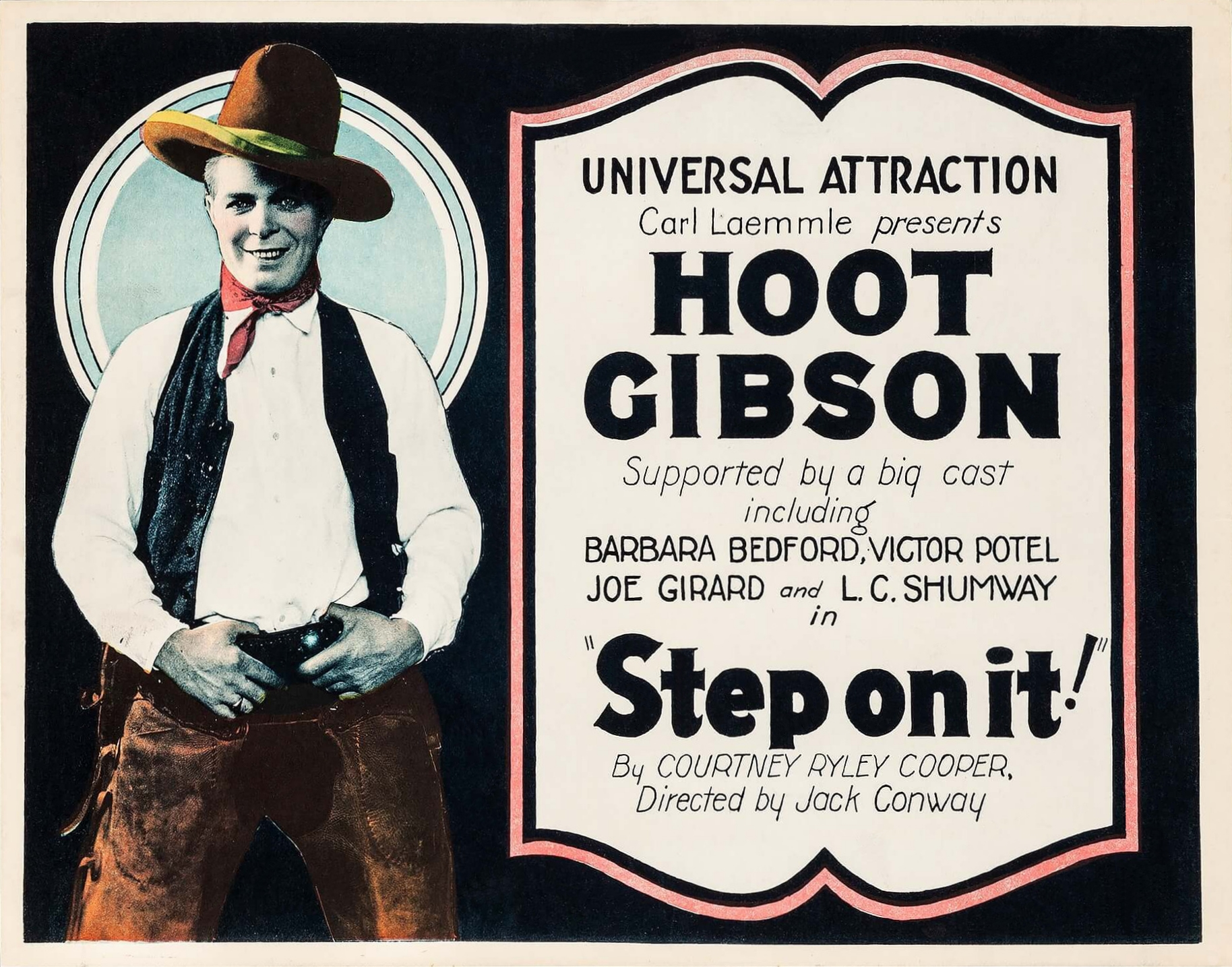
- Lobby card
- Directed by: Jack Conway
- Written by: Courtney Ryley Cooper (story); Arthur F. Statter
- Starring: Hoot Gibson
- Cinematography: Charles E. Kaufman
- Distributed by: Universal Pictures Corporation
- Release date: May 29, 1922
- Running time: 50 minutes
- Country: United States
- Languages: Silent; English intertitles

Step on It! is a lost 1922 American silent Western film directed by Jack Conway and featuring Hoot Gibson, released by Universal Pictures.

== Plot ==
As described in a film magazine, Vic Collins is continually losing cattle, but is unable to trace them beyond a stream that skirts his ranch. Lafe Brownell, an officer from Texas sent to trace cattle thieves, tells Vic that the new telegraph operator Lorraine Leighton, whom Vic has become interested in, is at the bottom of the thefts. Vic follows her to a nearby ranch and finds the bed of the stream dry, because the water has been shutoff at a sluice way. Thus, his cattle had been driven across the dry stream and then the water turned on again. Vic is captured by the thieves and threatened with death, but Lorraine rides back to his ranch for help. It turns out that she was mingled with the gang only to obtain evidence to clear her brother's name from falsely being jailed for murder.

== Cast ==
- Hoot Gibson as Vic Collins
- Edith Yorke as Mrs Collins
- Frank Lanning as Pidge Walters
- Barbara Bedford as Lorraine Leighton
- Victor Potel as Noisy Johnson
- Gloria Davenport as Letty Mather
- Joseph W. Girard as Lafe Brownell (credited as Joe Girard)
- Lee Shumway as Bowman (credited as L.C. Shumway)
- George Sowards as Cowboy
- Len Sowards as Cowboy

== See also ==
- Hoot Gibson filmography
