= Unwed Mother (film) =

- Theatrical release poster
- Directed by: Walter Doniger
- Screenplay by: Anson Bond; Alden Nash
- Produced by: Joseph Justman
- Starring: Norma Moore; Robert Vaughn; Billie Bird; Diana Darrin; Jeanne Cooper
- Cinematography: Lothrop B. Worth
- Edited by: Neil Brunnenkant
- Music by: Emil Newman
- Distributed by: Allied Artists
- Release date: November 22, 1958
- Running time: 74 min.
- Country: United States
- Language: English

Unwed Mother is a 1958 American drama film directed by Walter A. Doniger and starring Norma Moore, Robert Vaughn, Billie Bird, Diana Darrin and Jeanne Cooper.

== Plot ==
The plot concerns Betty Miller (Norma Moore), a shy country girl who moves from a farming community to Los Angeles. She falls in love with a smooth-talking grifter, Don Bigelow (Robert Vaughn), who involves her in a robbery, gets her pregnant, then abandons her. In jail on remand she is cruised by an elder cellmate and befriended by a strip club manageress (Billie Bird).

After visiting a drunken, backyard abortionist (Timothy Carey), Betty is confined in a home for unwed mothers and decides to give the baby up for adoption. But eventually she comes to regret that decision and pursues the foster parents who adopted her child.

== Cast ==
- Norma Moore as Betty Miller
- Robert Vaughn as Don Bigelow
- Diana Darrin as Mousie
- Billie Bird as Gertie
- Jeanne Cooper as Mrs. Horton
- Ron Hargrave as Ben
- Kathleen Hughes as Linda
- Sam Buffington as Mr. Paully
- Claire Carleton as Mrs. Miller
- Colette Jackson as Louella
- Timothy Carey as Doctor
- Ken Lynch as Ray Curtis
- Dorothy Adams as Mrs. Paully
- Joan Lora as Mary Ellen
- Ralph Gamble as Minister

Note: Although in keeping with the production code, while the word "pregnancy" is never uttered throughout the film, some actresses in the maternity home scenes are shown with pregnancy pads, which was uncommon on the screens of the 1950s and 60s where explicit displays of maternity tended to be hidden.
