= Damn Citizen =

1958 film

- Directed by: Robert Gordon
- Written by: Stirling Silliphant
- Produced by: Herman E. Webber
- Starring: Keith Andes; Margaret Hayes; Gene Evans
- Cinematography: Ellis W. Carter
- Edited by: Patrick McCormack
- Music by: Henry Mancini
- Color process: Black and white
- Production company: Universal-International Pictures
- Distributed by: Universal Pictures
- Release date: March 1, 1958
- Running time: 88 minutes
- Country: United States
- Language: English

Damn Citizen is a 1958 American film noir crime film directed by Robert Gordon and starring Keith Andes, Margaret Hayes and Gene Evans.

== Plot ==
A former WWII hero is appointed head of the state police by the governor of Louisiana to eliminate corruption in 1952.

== Cast ==
- Keith Andes as Col. Francis C. Grevemberg
- Margaret Hayes as Dorothy Grevemberg (as Maggie Hayes)
- Gene Evans as Maj. Al Arthur
- Lynn Bari as Pat Noble
- Jeffrey Stone as Paul Musso
- Edward Platt as Joseph Kosta (as Edward C. Platt)
- Ann Robinson as Cleo
- Sam Buffington as DeButts
- Clegg Hoyt as Sheriff Lloyd
- Kendall Clark as Col. Tom Hastings
- Rusty Lane as Police Sweeney
- Charles Horvath as Lt. Palmer
- Carolyn Kearney as Nancy
- Mr. Aaron M. Kohn as Himself
- REV. Dr. J. D. Grey as Himself
- Mr. Richard R. Foster as Himself
- Pershing Gervais as Big Jim
- Aaron A. Edgecombe as Major Sterling
- Robert H. Jamieson as Capt. Desmond (as Rev. Robert Jamieson)
- Paul Hostetler as Father Masters (as Paul S. Hostetler)
- Nathaniel F. Oddo as Thomas Gleason
- Dudley C. Foley Jr. as Fowler
- Charles A. Murphy as Judge
- George Trussell as Harry (as George M. Trussell)
- Jack Dempsey as Reporter
- Frank Hay as Reporter
- Tiger Flowers as News Commentator
- Martin N. Fritcher as Townsman
- Packie McFarland as Townsman
- James F. Cottingham as Townsman

== See also ==
- List of American films of 1958
- This Man Dawson: TV series loosely based on the film
