= Dorothy Adams =

American actress (1900–1988)

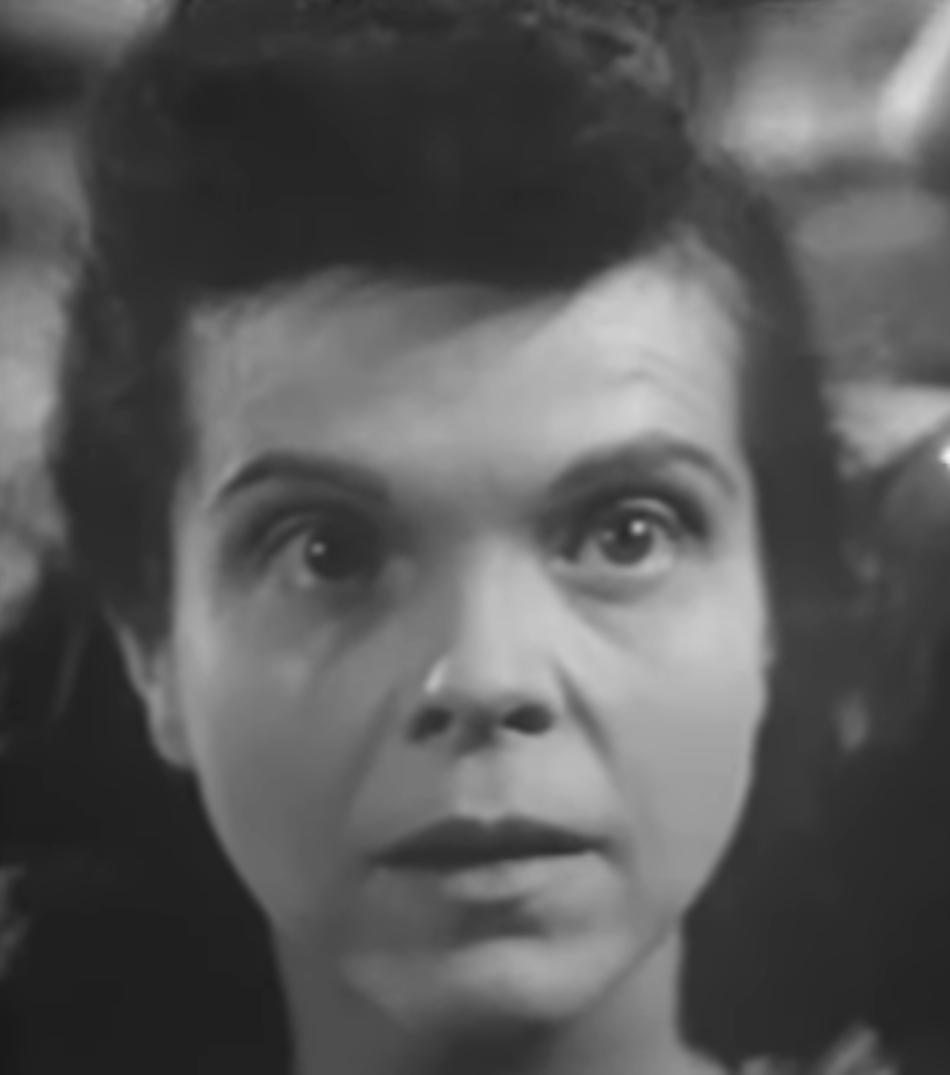
- Adams in Lady Gangster (1942)
- Born: Dorothy I. Adams; January 8, 1900; Hannah, North Dakota U.S.
- Died: March 16, 1988 (aged 88); Woodland Hills, California, U.S.
- Resting place: Inglewood Park Cemetery
- Occupation: Actress
- Years active: 1931−1975
- Spouse: Byron Foulger (m. 1926; died 1970)
- Children: Rachel Ames

Dorothy I. Adams (January 8, 1900 – March 16, 1988) was an American character actress of stage, film, and television.

== Early years ==
Born in Hannah, North Dakota, Adams was the daughter of Rachel Jamison and hardware salesman W. E. Adams. They later moved to Vancouver, British Columbia, where she attended Braemar School and the University of British Columbia.

== Stage ==
In the 1920s, Adams was active with the Moroni Olsen Players.

== Films and television ==
In film Adams is perhaps best remembered for her roles as Laura's maid in Laura (1944) and as Wilma Cameron's mother in The Best Years of Our Lives (1946).

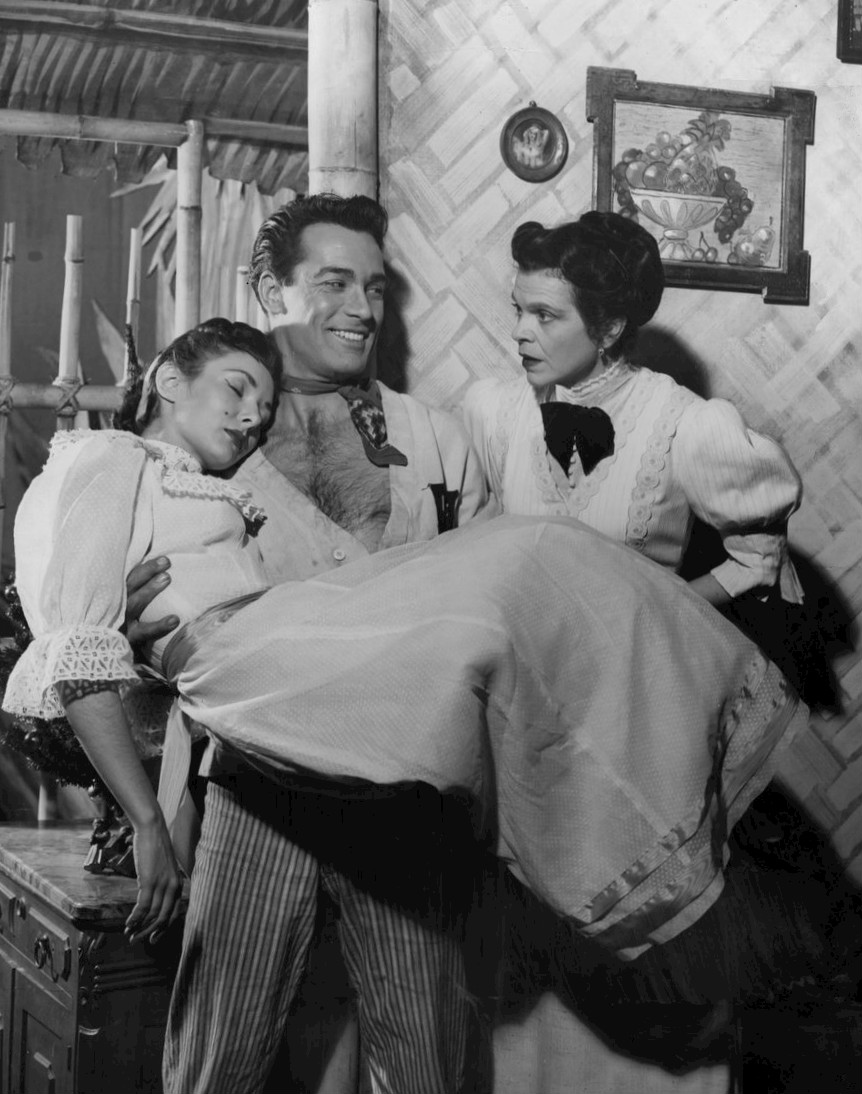
Adams (right) with Carl Betz and Dolores Mann in My Three Angels (1954)

Adams made numerous television appearances in the 1950s. She was seen in Gunsmoke with James Arness, and four episodes of the Western series The Adventures of Kit Carson, starring Bill Williams. She appeared in four episodes of the crime drama series Dragnet, starring Jack Webb. She made two guest appearances in Perry Mason, starring Raymond Burr. She also appeared in comedy series, such as a 1958 episode of Leave It to Beaver, starring Jerry Mathers.

== Later years ==
In the 1960s, she was a popular acting instructor at the UCLA School of Theater, Film and Television.

== Personal life ==
Adams was married to character actor Byron Foulger from 1926 until his death in 1970. She was the mother of soap opera actress Rachel Ames.

== Death ==
Adams died from a heart failure on March 16th, 1988 in Woodland Hills, California. Her ashes lie with those of her husband in niche A142 in the Del Prado Mausoleum of Inglewood Park Cemetery in California.

== Partial filmography ==
- 1938: Condemned Women as Nurse (uncredited)
- 1938: Crime Ring as Second Fortune Teller (uncredited)
- 1938: Broadway Musketeers as Anna, Judy's Governess
- 1939: Calling Dr. Kildare as Jenny's Mother (uncredited)
- 1939: Bachelor Mother as Secretary (uncredited)
- 1939: Mickey the Kid as Student's Mother (uncredited)
- 1939: On Borrowed Time as Florist (uncredited)
- 1939: Career as Telephone Operator (uncredited)
- 1939: The Women as Miss Atkinson (uncredited)
- 1939: Disputed Passage as Nurse (uncredited)
- 1939: Ninotchka as Jacqueline - Swana's Maid (uncredited)
- 1939: A Child Is Born as Nurse (uncredited)
- 1940: The Fight for Life as The Young Woman
- 1940: Babies for Sale as Mother in Dr. Gaines' Office (uncredited)
- 1940: Untamed as 3rd Nurse
- 1940: Cross-Country Romance as Emmy (uncredited)
- 1940: We Who Are Young as Bellevue Hospital Nurse (uncredited)
- 1940: Dr. Christian Meets the Women as Indigent Woman (uncredited)
- 1940: Lucky Partners as Maid at Ethel's (uncredited)
- 1940: Nobody's Children as Mrs. Alice Stone (uncredited)
- 1941: The Devil Commands as Mrs. Marcy
- 1941: Back Street as Mrs. Brown (uncredited)
- 1941: Tobacco Road as Payne's Secretary (uncredited)
- 1941: Penny Serenade as Mother in Stalled Car (uncredited)
- 1941: The Flame of New Orleans as Cousin
- 1941: Affectionately Yours as Reception Nurse at Hospital (uncredited)
- 1941: The Shepherd of the Hills as Elvy
- 1941: Highway West as Wife (uncredited)
- 1941: Whistling in the Dark as Mrs. Farrell (uncredited)
- 1941: One Foot in Heaven as Woman Behind Hope at Baptism (uncredited)
- 1941: Glamour Boy as Mr. Devin - Fruit Stand Proprietress (uncredited)
- 1941: Bedtime Story as Betsy
- 1942: Joe Smith, American as Nurse (uncredited)
- 1942: Lady Gangster as Deaf Annie
- 1942: The Gay Sisters as Nurse (uncredited)
- 1942: Dr. Gillespie's New Assistant as Mrs. Alberts (uncredited)
- 1943: So Proudly We Hail! as Lt. Irma Emerson
- 1943: O, My Darling Clementine as Dancer (uncredited)
- 1944: Since You Went Away as Nurse (uncredited)
- 1944: Bathing Beauty as Ms. Hanney (uncredited)
- 1944: Laura as Bessie Clary, Laura's Maid (uncredited)
- 1945: Keep Your Powder Dry as WAC Seamstress #2 (uncredited)
- 1945: Circumstantial Evidence as Bolger's Wife
- 1945: Captain Eddie as Nurse (uncredited)
- 1945: The Falcon in San Francisco as Hotel Maid (uncredited)
- 1945: Fallen Angel as Stella's Neighbor (uncredited)
- 1946: Miss Susie Slagle's as Mrs. Johnson
- 1946: Sentimental Journey as Martha (uncredited)
- 1946: O.S.S. as Claudette (uncredited)
- 1946: The Inner Circle as Emma Wilson
- 1946: Nocturne as Angry Apartment House Tenant (uncredited)
- 1946: The Best Years of Our Lives as Mrs. Cameron
- 1946: A Boy and His Dog (Short) as Mrs. Allen
- 1947: That's My Man as Millie
- 1947: The Trouble with Women as Henry's Mothers (uncredited)
- 1947: Unconquered as Woman Beside Garth Happy at Bagpipes (uncredited)
- 1948: The Foxes of Harrow as Mrs. Sara Fox (uncredited)
- 1948: Sitting Pretty as Mrs. Goul (scenes deleted)
- 1948: The Sainted Sisters as Widow Davitt
- 1948: He Walked by Night as Paranoid Housewife (uncredited)
- 1949: Down to the Sea in Ships as Miss Hopkins (uncredited)
- 1949: Not Wanted as Mrs. Aggie Kelton
- 1949: Samson and Delilah as Screaming Temple Spectator (uncredited)
- 1950: Montana as Kitty Maynard (uncredited)
- 1950: Paid in Full as Emily Burroughs, Nurse (uncredited)
- 1950: The Outriders as Farmer's Wife (uncredited)
- 1950: The Cariboo Trail as Nurse
- 1950: The Jackpot as Watch Saleswoman - Store Employee (uncredited)
- 1951: The First Legion as Mrs. Dunn
- 1951: Home Town Story as Hospital Nurse (uncredited)
- 1952: The Greatest Show on Earth as Sam's Wife (uncredited)
- 1952: Fort Osage as Mrs. Winfield
- 1952: Jet Job as Mrs. Kovak
- 1952: The Winning Team as Ma Alexander
- 1952: Carrie as Mrs. Meebers
- 1954: Rose Marie as Townswoman (uncredited)
- 1954: There's No Business Like Show Business as Nurse (uncredited)
- 1955: Many Rivers to Cross as Mrs. Crawford (uncredited)
- 1955: The Prodigal as Carpenter's Wife
- 1956: The Broken Star as Mrs. Trail (uncredited)
- 1956: The Man in the Gray Flannel Suit as Mrs. Hopkins' Maid (uncredited)
- 1956: The Killing as Ruthie O'Reilly
- 1956: Three for Jamie Dawn as Helen March
- 1956: Johnny Concho as Sarah Dark
- 1956: These Wilder Years as Aunt Martha
- 1956: The Ten Commandments as Slave woman / Hebrew at Golden Calf / Hebrew at Rameses' Gate
- 1956: Gunsmoke (TV Series, season 2, episode 1, "Cow Doctor") as Mrs. Pitcher
- 1957: Hot Rod Rumble as Ma Crawford
- 1957: The Buckskin Lady as Mrs. Adams
- 1957: An Affair to Remember as Mother at Rehearsal (uncredited)
- 1957: 3:10 to Yuma as Mrs. Potter (uncredited)
- 1958: Leave It to Beaver (TV Series) as Miss Wakeland, Acting Teacher
- 1958: Gunman's Walk as Mrs. Stotheby (uncredited)
- 1958: The Big Country as Hannassey Woman
- 1958: Unwed Mother as Mrs. Paully
- 1960: From the Terrace as Mrs. Benziger (uncredited)
- 1961: The Twilight Zone (TV Series, "Dust", Season 2, episode 12) as Mrs. Canfield
- 1969: The Good Guys and the Bad Guys as Mrs. Pierce (uncredited)
- 1975: Peeper as Mrs. Prendergast

== Selected television ==
Year	Title	Role	Notes
1952	The Adventures of Kit Carson	Mrs. Williams	Episode "Snake River Trapper"
1952	The Adventures of Kit Carson	Mrs. Trumbull	Episode "Outlaw Paradise"
1952	The Adventures of Kit Carson	Mrs. Raymond	Episode "Pledge to Danger"
1953	The Adventures of Kit Carson	Landlady	Episode "Claim Jumpers"
1953	Dragnet		Episode "The Big In-Laws" (1953)
1953	Death Valley Days	Amelia Griffen	Season 2, Episode 1, "The Diamond Babe"
1956	Gunsmoke	Mrs. Pitcher	Episode "Cow Doctor"
1957	Gunsmoke	Mrs. Glick	Episode " Born to Hang"
1958	Leave It to Beaver	Miss Wakeland	Episode "School Play"
1961	The Twilight Zone	Mrs. Canfield	Season 2, Episode 12, "Dust"
