= Wanted Dead or Alive (TV series) =

American Western television series (1958–1961)

- Title card
- Genre: Western
- Starring: Steve McQueen; Wright King
- Theme music composer: William Loose (first season); Herschel Burke Gilbert (second and third seasons)
- Country of origin: United States
- Original language: English
- No. of seasons: 3
- No. of episodes: 94 (list of episodes)

Production
- Producer: Vincent Fennelly
- Camera setup: Single-camera
- Running time: 25 mins.
- Production companies: Four Star Television; Malcom Enterprises, Inc; CBS Productions

Original release
- Network: CBS
- Release: September 6, 1958 – March 29, 1961

Related
- Trackdown

Wanted Dead or Alive is an American Western television series starring Steve McQueen as bounty hunter Josh Randall. It aired on CBS for three seasons from 1958–1961. The black-and-white program was a spin-off from "The Bounty Hunter", a March 1958 episode of Trackdown, a 1957–1959 Western series starring Robert Culp. Both series were produced by Vincent Fennelly for Four Star Television in association with CBS.

The series made McQueen, known for the concept of "cool" in entertainment, a television star. He later became the first TV star to cross over into comparable status on the big screen.

== Synopsis ==
Josh Randall is a Confederate veteran and bounty hunter with a soft heart. He often donates his earnings to the needy, and helps his prisoners if they have been wrongly accused.

Although Randall is a bounty hunter, he doesn't only chase and capture men on wanted posters. He also settles a family feud, frees unjustly jailed or sentenced men, helps an amnesia victim recover his memory, and finds missing husbands, sons, fathers, a fiancée, a suitor, a daughter who had been captured many years earlier by Indians, an Army deserter, a pet sheep, and even Santa Claus. This variety, as well as his pursuit of justice and not just money, contributed to the show's attraction and popularity.

Except for a few episodes at the beginning of the series, Randall rode an energetic horse named Ringo.

Beginning with the 1960 episode, "Jason", actor Wright King appeared in a supporting role as Jason Nichols, an eager young deputy sheriff turned bounty hunter. By the start of the third season, Nichols had been dropped. The episode, "The Partners", in which Nichols instigated a gunfight resulting in three deaths that Randall felt were avoidable, is often considered the episode that broke up the partnership, although that was actually only the second episode with Wright King and long before his last episode.

Three hard mother-grabbin' years, but I learned my trade and it gave me discipline. McQueen, commenting about his experience on the series.

== Cast ==
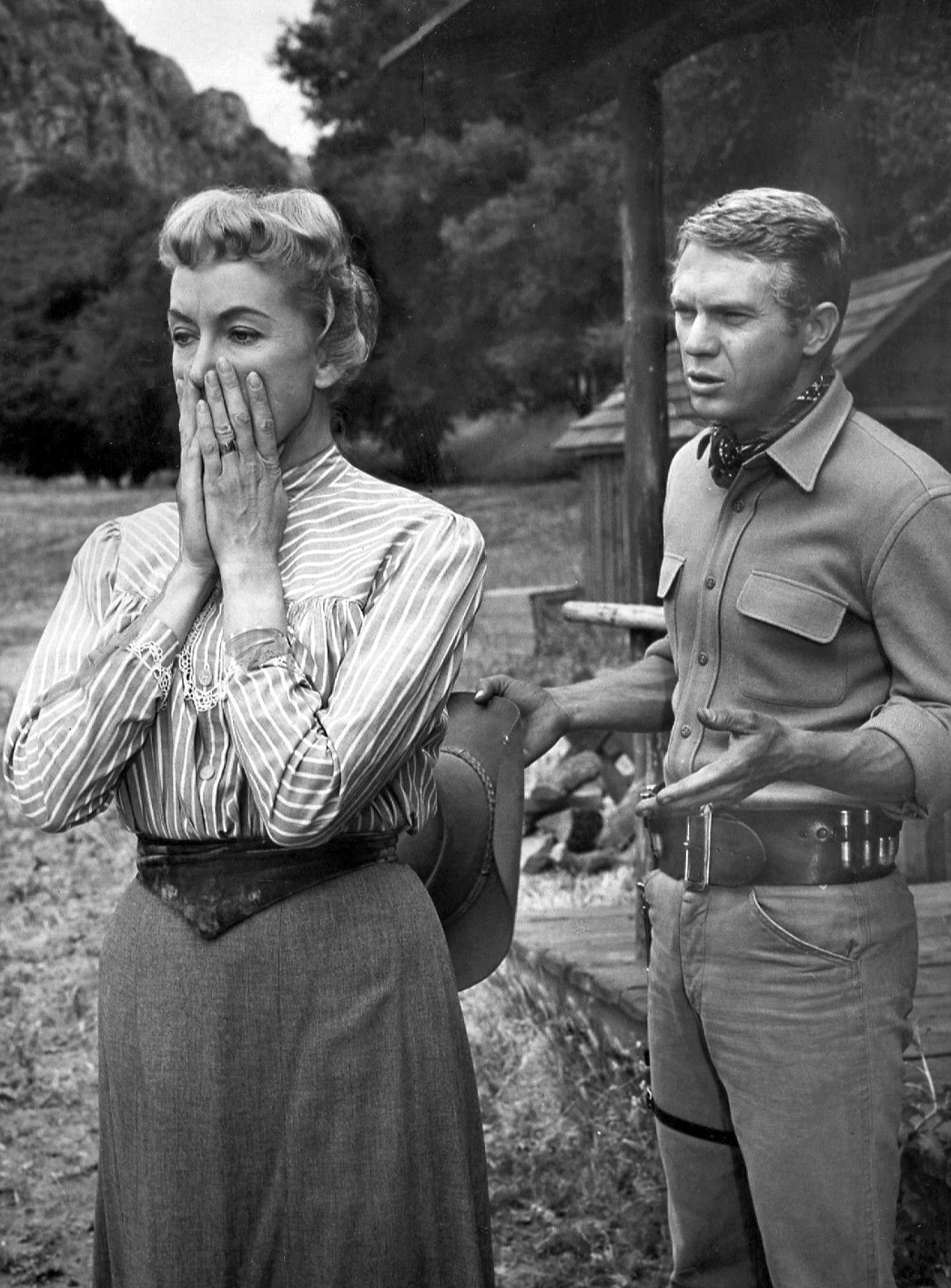
Randall pleads with a mother (Virginia Gregg) looking to obtain medical treatment for her son (1959)

=== Main ===
Steve McQueen played Josh Randall, the primary character, appearing in all 94 episodes.

=== Recurring ===
- Wright King as Jason Nichols
- Olan Soule as the Bartender

=== Guest stars ===
- Nick Adams
- Charles Aidman
- Claude Akins
- Chris Alcaide
- Fred Aldrich
- John Anderson
- Robert Anderson
- R. G. Armstrong
- Noah Beery Jr.
- Fred Beir
- Russ Bender
- James Best
- George Brenlin
- Steve Brodie
- Joe Brooks
- Robert Burton
- Archie Butler
- King Calder
- Robert Carricart
- Anthony Caruso
- James Chandler
- Lon Chaney Jr.
- John Cliff
- Sidney Clute
- James Coburn
- Fred Coby
- Marian Collier
- Dennis Cross
- Royal Dano
- John Dehner
- Brad Dexter
- Kem Dibbs
- Lawrence Dobkin
- King Donovan
- Betsy Drake
- Don Dubbins
- Robert Ellenstein
- Beverly Garland
- Richard Garland
- Don Gordon
- Dabbs Greer
- Robert Griffin
- Herman Hack
- Alan Hale Jr.
- Chick Hannan
- Arthur Hanson
- Skip Homeier
- Rodolfo Hoyos Jr.
- Clegg Hoyt
- I. Stanford Jolley
- Ray Jones
- DeForest Kelley
- Don Kennedy
- Douglas Kennedy
- Fred Krone
- Lou Krugman
- Ethan Laidlaw
- Martin Landau
- Michael Landon
- Rusty Lane
- Cloris Leachman
- Nolan Leary
- Nan Leslie
- Michael Lipton
- Ken Mayer
- Rod McGaughy
- Joyce Meadows
- Ralph Meeker
- Joseph Mell
- Troy Melton
- Mort Mills
- Mary Tyler Moore
- Lori Nelson
- Jimmy Noel
- James Nolan
- Jay North
- Warren Oates
- Susan Oliver
- James Parnell
- Luana Patten
- Joseph V. Perry
- Joe Ploski
- Dee Pollock
- Bill Quinn
- Mike Ragan
- Stafford Repp
- Victor Rodman
- Walter Sande
- Cosmo Sardo
- William Schallert
- Everett Sloane
- Jay Silverheels
- George Sowards
- Paul Stader
- Suzanne Storrs
- Jack Tornek
- Lee Van Cleef
- Vaughn Taylor
- Alan Wells
- Jean Willes
- Than Wyenn

== Episodes ==
Season	Episodes	Originally released		Rank	Average viewership (in millions)
Season	Episodes	First released	Last released	Rank	Average viewership (in millions)
1	36	September 6, 1958	May 9, 1959	16	28.0
2	32	September 5, 1959	May 21, 1960	9	28.7
3	26	September 21, 1960	March 29, 1961	TBA	TBA

== Production ==
=== Development ===
Vincent Fennelly and Four Star Television were considering a spinoff of their current series, Trackdown, which itself was a spinoff of Zane Grey Theater. At the time, McQueen's manager, Hillard Elkins, was also representing Trackdown star Robert Culp. Elkins knew of the spinoff plan and suggested McQueen for the role. McQueen's style was exactly what Fennelly was looking for to fill the role. Initially not interested in doing Westerns, McQueen agreed to the role based on his ability to connect with Fennelly and his vision for the role of Randall. The pilot was filmed before McQueen did The Blob in 1958.

Four Star founder, Dick Powell, was initially hesitant about McQueen in the lead role due to McQueen's short stature, as well as his inability to ride horses, but he changed his mind after seeing early clips of the first episode. It was Powell's idea to give the character of Josh Randall a gimmick weapon.

Prior to initial filming, Steve McQueen did not know how to ride horses and was forced to learn for the show's production.

McQueen had a reputation for being difficult to work with, and he fired three stunt men within the first day's filming, including Richard Farnsworth. Ultimately, that job went to Loren Janes, who also doubled for McQueen in a number of movies.

Although the show and its episodes are fiction, bounty hunters were common in the American West, and there is some historical basis for the stories.

McQueen's initial salary for the show was $750 per episode, but due to the show's popularity, that climbed to $100,000 per year, which was extremely high for the time. The time slot change for the third season that ultimately ruined the show's ratings may have been CBS's way of killing the show due to ever increasing production costs. Another factor was McQueen's strained relationship with Viceroy cigarettes, the show's sponsor.

The show helped launch the careers of several directors.

=== Writing ===
Writers included Samuel A. Peeples, Tom Gries and Charles Beaumont.

=== Filming ===
The premiere episode was filmed on the 20th Century Fox backlot in West Los Angeles and on location in Arizona, while the rest of the series was filmed at the Selznick Studios. A number of additional shooting locations were used, with the outdoor action sequences of several episodes shot on the famed Iverson Movie Ranch in Chatsworth, California. A number of sets on the Republic Pictures backlot in Studio City, California, also appear in the series, notably the Western street and the Duchess Ranch set, which, at the time of production on the series, consisted mainly of a large barn, a main house and a bunkhouse.

=== Music ===
The main theme was composed by Rudy Schrager. Music was supervised by Herschel Burke Gilbert.

=== Colorized version ===
In December 1987, Four Star International colorized Wanted Dead or Alive, making it the first vintage television series to be completely colorized. The colorized version aired on at least 50 independent television stations.

=== Firearms ===
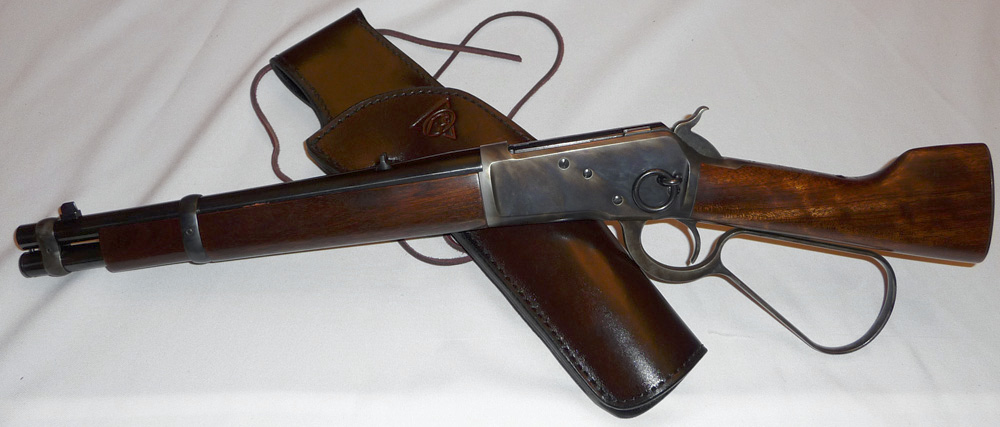
Mare's Leg and holster

Randall carries a gimmick rifle called the "Mare's Leg" in a unique quick-draw holster. The Mare's Leg was a shortened Winchester Model 1892 .44-40, with a gun belt that held .45-70 cartridges that, although they couldn't be fired from the weapon, looked more intimidating. The gun itself was a real, working firearm rather than a prop, and had to be registered with the LAPD.

To learn the art of the quick draw, McQueen turned to Sammy Davis Jr., who he knew from working in New York. Davis was known for being proficient with Western-style pistol work.

== Themes ==
Early television Westerns were aimed at a youth audience, but by the mid-1950s, Western films and television began being made to attract an adult audience. Wanted Dead or Alive was one of the several shows that came to define the "adult Western" of the era, with an attractive leading character in the primary role. Unlike many television Westerns of the era, Wanted Dead or Alive focused on the action rather than character development, and McQueen's method style was unique to the Westerns of the period. McQueen's character was a man of few words and showed little emotion, often appearing to be interested more in the bounty hunter's reward than in justice.

Although most television Westerns of the time were of the classic genre, Wanted Dead or Alive's Josh Randall was more of an antihero of the Revisionist Western genre. McQueen initially had been reluctant to do a Western, but when the opportunity arose for the character to be less of the traditional hero, he felt he was able to bring more of himself into a realistic portrayal of the bounty hunter.

== Release ==
=== Broadcast ===
Wanted Dead or Alive first aired on CBS on September 6, 1958. It aired Saturday nights from 8:30–9 p.m. until September 1960. From September 1960 until March 1961, it aired on Wednesday nights, 8:30–9 p.m.

=== Home media ===
On June 7, 2005, New Line Home Entertainment released season 1 of Wanted Dead or Alive on DVD in Region 1. In 2007, BCI Eclipse acquired the distribution rights to the series, and released the final two seasons on DVD. Season 2 was released on July 17, 2007, and Season 3 on October 16, 2007.

In June 2009, Mill Creek Entertainment acquired the rights to the series under license from copyright holder StudioCanal, and has subsequently re-released the first two seasons. On August 25, 2009, they released an 11-disc DVD box set featuring all 94 episodes of the series.

== Reception ==
Initially, the show was popular with audiences, but not popular with critics. A review in Variety, September 10, 1958, noted that McQueen's characterization of the bounty hunter was "almost stuffy in its allegiance to the breed. ... Acting is ok. It's obvious what the half-hour needs is scripting and perhaps some cleaner direction." However, by the third season, the ratings had crashed, some of which can be attributed to the change from its original Saturday night time slot to Wednesday nights directly opposite the popular series, The Adventures of Ozzie and Harriet.

=== Ratings ===
Viewership and ratings per season of Show
Season	Timeslot (ET)	Network	Episodes	First aired		Last aired		Viewership rank	Avg. viewers (millions)	Ref.
Season	Timeslot (ET)	Network	Episodes	Date	Viewers (millions)	Date	Viewers (millions)	Viewership rank	Avg. viewers (millions)	Ref.
1	Saturday 8:30pm	CBS	36	September 6, 1958	TBD	May 9, 1959	TBD	16	28.0	
2	Saturday 8:30pm	CBS	32	June 30, 2014	TBD	September 22, 2014	TBD	9	28.7	
3	Wednesday 8:30pm	CBS	26	June 25, 2015	TBD	September 10, 2015	TBD	TBD	TBD	N/A

== 1986 film ==
In 1986, New World Pictures adapted the series into a low-budget film of the same title; Rutger Hauer played modern-day bounty hunter Nick Randall, Josh's grandson.
