= Denver, Missouri =

Village in Worth County, Missouri, United States

- Village
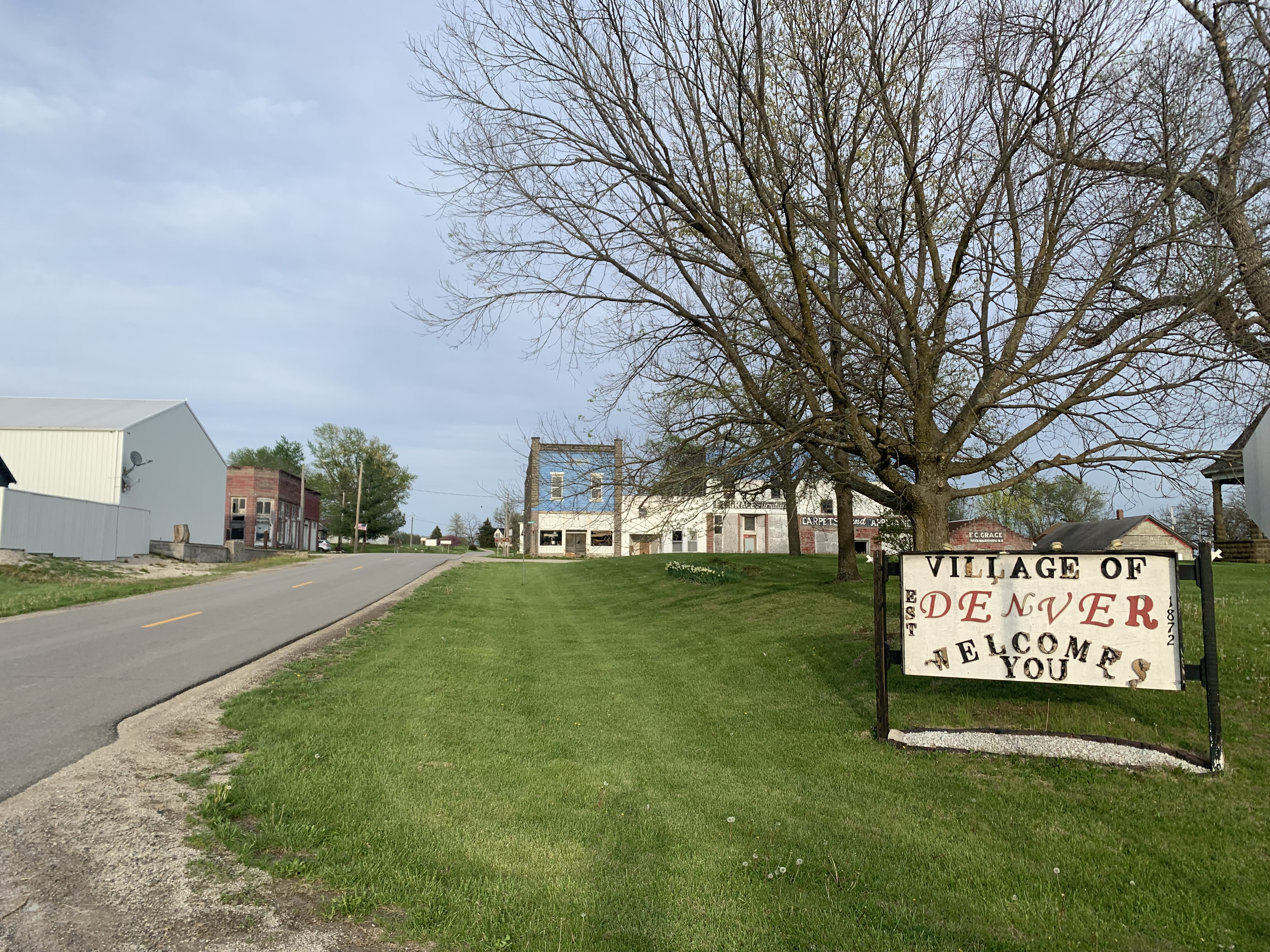
- Denver, Missouri from Route M facing east

- Location of Denver, Missouri
- Coordinates: 40°23′56″N 94°19′24″W
- Country: United States
- State: Missouri
- County: Worth
- Township: Allen
- Incorporated: 1928

Area
  - Total: 0.38 sq mi (0.99 km^{2})
  - Land: 0.38 sq mi (0.99 km^{2})
  - Water: 0 sq mi (0.00 km^{2})
- Elevation: 942 ft (287 m)

Population (2020)
  - Total: 32
  - Density: 83.6/sq mi (32.28/km^{2})
- Time zone: UTC-6 (Central (CST))
  - Summer (DST): UTC-5 (CDT)
- ZIP code: 64441
- Area code: 660
- FIPS code: 29-19162
- GNIS feature ID: 2398714

Denver is a village in southern Worth County, Missouri, United States. The population was 32 at the 2020 Census.

== History ==
Denver was originally named "Fairview", and under the latter name was laid out in 1849. A variant name was "Grant's Hill". and a post office for Grant's Hill was established in 1866. The name was changed to Denver in 1872. The present name honors James W. Denver, 5th Territorial Governor of Kansas. The population in the 1870s was about 300.

== Geography ==
Denver is located above the east bank of the East Fork of the Grand River just south of the confluence of Little Rock Creek with the East Fork. The community lies along Missouri Route M just over one-half mile north of the Worth-Gentry county line.

According to the United States Census Bureau, the village has a total area of 0.38 square miles (0.98 km^{2}), all land.

== Demographics ==
Historical population
Census	Pop.	Note	%±
1880	218		—
1890	295		35.3%
1930	203		—
1940	213		4.9%
1950	144		−32.4%
1960	116		−19.4%
1970	104		−10.3%
1980	74		−28.8%
1990	53		−28.4%
2000	40		−24.5%
2010	39		−2.5%
2020	32		−17.9%
U.S. Decennial Census

=== 2010 census ===
As of the census of 2010, there were 39 people, 16 households, and 11 families residing in the village. The population density was 102.6 inhabitants per square mile (39.6/km^{2}). There were 29 housing units at an average density of 76.3 per square mile (29.5/km^{2}). The racial makeup of the village was 94.9% White and 5.1% African American.

There were 16 households, of which 37.5% had children under the age of 18 living with them, 62.5% were married couples living together, 6.3% had a male householder with no wife present, and 31.3% were non-families. 31.3% of all households were made up of individuals, and 12.6% had someone living alone who was 65 years of age or older. The average household size was 2.44 and the average family size was 3.09.

The median age in the village was 42.5 years. 33.3% of residents were under the age of 18; 0.0% were between the ages of 18 and 24; 17.9% were from 25 to 44; 43.5% were from 45 to 64; and 5.1% were 65 years of age or older. The gender makeup of the village was 51.3% male and 48.7% female.

=== 2000 census ===
As of the census of 2000, there were 40 people, 20 households, and 11 families residing in the village. The population density was 104.4 inhabitants per square mile (40.3/km^{2}). There were 28 housing units at an average density of 73.1 per square mile (28.2/km^{2}). The racial makeup of the village was 100.00% White. Hispanic or Latino of any race were 2.50% of the population.

There were 20 households, out of which 30.0% had children under the age of 18 living with them, 30.0% were married couples living together, 10.0% had a female householder with no husband present, and 45.0% were non-families. 45.0% of all households were made up of individuals, and 15.0% had someone living alone who was 65 years of age or older. The average household size was 2.00 and the average family size was 2.73.

In the village, the population was spread out, with 25.0% under the age of 18, 5.0% from 18 to 24, 32.5% from 25 to 44, 17.5% from 45 to 64, and 20.0% who were 65 years of age or older. The median age was 41 years. For every 100 females, there were 110.5 males. For every 100 females age 18 and over, there were 100.0 males.

The median income for a household in the village was $18,750, and the median income for a family was $16,250. Males had a median income of $18,750 versus $0 for females. The per capita income for the village was $7,283. There were 33.3% of families and 40.0% of the population living below the poverty line, including 61.5% of under eighteens and 100.0% of those over 64.

== See also ==
- List of municipalities in Missouri
