= List of The Deputy episodes =

This is a list of all episodes of the western television series The Deputy.

== Series overview ==
Season	Episodes	Originally released	
Season	Episodes	First released	Last released
1	39	September 12, 1959	July 9, 1960
2	37	September 24, 1960	July 1, 1961

== Episodes ==
- (s) = Story
- (t) = Teleplay

=== Season 1 (1959–60) ===
No. overall	No. in season	Title	Directed by	Written by	Original release date
1	1	"Badge for a Day"	Don Medford	Roland Kibbee, Norman Lear	September 12, 1959
Marshal Simon Fry uses Clay McCord to capture a gang of thieves. Featuring Robert J. Wilke.
2	2	"The Wild Wind"	David Butler	N.B. Stone, Jr.	September 19, 1959
Clay tries to rescue three young men from a gang of rustlers. Featuring John Ashley.
3	3	"Back to Glory"	Felix E. Feist	Charles B. Smith	September 26, 1959
Simon searches for a murderer who's abducted an actress, while Clay and Herk track down an escaped prisoner who molested another woman. Featuring Marie Windsor and Frank de Kova.
4	4	"Shadow of the Noose"	Robert B. Sinclair	Roland Kibbee	October 3, 1959
Simon is confronted by a lynch mob after he arrests a drifter for murdering a farmer and his wife. Featuring Clu Gulager and Denver Pyle.
5	5	"Powder Keg"	David Butler	Wells Root, Ron Bishop	October 10, 1959
Herk captures a renegade wanted for supplying gunpowder to the Indians, then finds himself in danger by his prisoner's Indian allies thanks to a telegrapher. Featuring Read Morgan.
6	6	"Like Father, –"	David Butler	Jerry Sackheim	October 17, 1959
A reformed ex-convict discovers that his son became a veterinarian while in prison, and a gunfighter with a grudge against the young man is looking for a showdown. Featuring James Westerfield.
7	7	"Proof of Guilt"	Arthur Lubin	Melvin Levy	October 24, 1959
An ex-convict takes the blame for his son's involvement in a series of robberies at smelting operations for gold bars. Featuring Lance Fuller and Roy Barcroft.
8	8	"The Johnny Shanks Story"	David Butler	N.B. Stone, Jr.	October 31, 1959
Three bounty hunters are after Johnny Shanks, who's being led to a new ranch by Clay. Featuring Skip Homeier and Don "Red" Barry.
9	9	"Focus of Doom"	Arthur Lubin	Michel Kraike (s), Sidney Michaels (t)	November 7, 1959
Simon sets a trap for the people who murdered three town marshals.
10	10	"The Big Four"	David Butler	Kay Lenard, Jess Carneol	November 14, 1959
Simon learns that four of the most notorious outlaws have joined forces. Featuring George Kennedy.
11	11	"The Next Bullet"	David Butler	Kay Lenard, Jess Carneol	November 28, 1959
Simon believes that the brother of a woman convicted of murdering her husband is plotting revenge on Herk. Featuring Walter Coy.
12	12	"The Deal"	Herschel Daugherty	Michel Kraike (s), Herbert Purdom (t)	December 5, 1959
An outlaw gang kidnaps Fran to force Clay to help them steal a $20,000 mine payroll.
13	13	"Land Greed"	Robert B. Sinclair	Dale Eunson, Katherine Eunson	December 12, 1959
Clay finds evidence of a widow's cattle being rustled. Featuring Vivian Vance.
14	14	"Man of Peace"	Frank Arrigo	Roland Kibbee (s), Herbert Purdom (t)	December 19, 1959
When Apaches steal two wagons full of rifles, Clay tries to resolve the issue peacefully before another Indian war begins. Featuring Edgar Buchanan.
15	15	"The Orphans"	Frederick Stephani	Katherine Eunson, Dale Eunson	December 26, 1959
Clay finds three children in a covered wagon and discovers their parents have been murdered.
16	16	"Backfire"	James Hogan	Wilton Schiller	January 2, 1960
Herk shoots an escaped prisoner in the back, then two outlaws come to settle the score.
17	17	"Hang the Law"	Robert B. Sinclair	Herbert Purdom	January 9, 1960
Clay is sentenced to be hanged for the murder of the town drunk. Featuring Martha Hyer.
18	18	"The Silent Gun"	Sidney Lanfield	Hendrik Vollaerts	January 23, 1960
A mute gunfighter causes trouble in Silver City.
19	19	"The Hidden Motive"	Sidney Lanfield	Jess Carneol (t), Michel Kriake (s), Kay Lenard (t)	January 30, 1960
Clay shoots a childhood friend who comes up from behind, leading him to wonder if the man was with a gang of cattle rustlers Clay's pursuing or had just heard the shooting.
20	20	"Lawman's Blood"	John Brahm	Charles B. Smith	February 6, 1960
The doctor of Silver City is abducted by an outlaw whose brother was shot during a holdup, and even though Clay kills the kidnapper, the doctor won't leave his patient to die.
21	21	"The Return of Simon Fry"	Arthur Lubin	Terence Maples	February 13, 1960
Simon narrowly escapes an assassination attempt and uses his presumed death to trap his would-be killers. Featuring Stacy Keach Sr.
22	22	"Queen Bea"	Herschel Daugherty	Herbert Purdom	February 20, 1960
Clay suspects that a woman is leading a gang of criminals that monopolizes general stores by forcing their competitors out of business. Featuring Phyllis Avery.
23	23	"The Two Faces of Bob Claxton"	David Butler	Charles O'Neal	February 27, 1960
Bob Claxton, the youngest member of a gang of outlaw brothers, pretends to be willing to give up his life of crime.
24	24	"Lady With a Mission"	Sidney Lanfield	Charles B. Smith	March 5, 1960
A suffragette is injured at a rally in Prescott and asks for protection in Silver City.
25	25	"The Border Between"	Frank Arrigo	Hal Biller, Austin Kalish	March 12, 1960
Clay attempts to rescue a wealthy landowner's kidnapped daughter. Featuring Leo Gordon.
26	26	"Final Payment"	Frank Arrigo	Charles R. Marion	March 19, 1960
A businessman plots revenge on Clay and Fran for their father paralyzing him in a gunfight. Featuring Gerald Mohr and Mari Aldon.
27	27	"Dark Reward"	Louis King	Marianna Mosner	March 26, 1960
A gang of criminals takes advantage of an offer to collect rewards for dead bank robbers by staging a robbery. Featuring Jean Willes.
28	28	"Marked for Bounty"	Sidney Lanfield	William Yagemann	April 2, 1960
A notorious bounty hunter goes after a young man who was let out of prison to see his dying father. Featuring Vito Scotti.
29	29	"The Truly Yours"	David Butler	Montgomery Pittman (s/t), Herbert Purdom (t)	April 9, 1960
A gang of outlaws burns down Clay's general store as a distraction so they can rob the bank with ease. Featuring James Coburn and Miriam Colon.
30	30	"A Time to Sow"	Louis King	Kay Lenard, Jess Carneol	April 23, 1960
Clay tries to help a young couple find a place to settle while on the lookout for a gunman supposedly hired to settle a dispute over water rights. Featuring Frank Ferguson and Richard Crenna.
31	31	"The Last Gunfight"	Sidney Lanfield	Richard Carr (s), Charles B. Smith (t)	April 30, 1960
A famous gunfighter is forced into a showdown with two troublemakers looking to make their own reputation. Featuring Robert Redford.
32	32	"Chain of Action"	Sidney Lanfield	Lester Fuller	May 7, 1960
Clay spends the night in jail hoping to convince a convicted outlaw to reveal the location of his stolen loot so that a boy's eyesight can be fixed.
33	33	"The Lucifer Urge"	Sidney Lanfield	Ellis Kadison	May 14, 1960
Clay seeks a legal way to fight the man who killed his father. Featuring George Tobias and Ralph Moody.
34	34	"Palace of Chance"	Sidney Lanfield	Frank Edmunds (s), Charles B. Smith (s/t)	May 21, 1960
Simon believes an escaped convict is headed for a casino to enlist his ex-girlfriend's help. Featuring Karen Steele, Steve Brodie and Lee Van Cleef.
35	35	"The X Game"	David Butler	Herbert Purdom	May 28, 1960
Clay pursues a pair of land-grabbers who are conning simple folk out of their property. Featuring John Hoyt and Don Gordon.
36	36	"The Stand-Off"	David Butler	Ellis Kadison (t), Louis Paul (s)	June 11, 1960
Clay engages in a standoff with an escaped prisoner who's shot Simon. Featuring Alan Hale Jr.
37	37	"Trail of Darkness"	Sidney Lanfield	Rik Vollaerts	June 18, 1960
An outlaw gang abducts Simon to learn the whereabouts of their wounded associate, so Clay leads a posse to track down the bandits. Featuring Clu Gulager.
38	38	"The Choice"	David Butler	Lester Fuller (t), Saul Schwartz (s/t)	June 25, 1960
An ex-convict returns to Silver City and accepts a job as Doc Landy's apprentice. Featuring Vince Edwards and Chris Alcaide.
39	39	"Ma Mack"	Robert B. Sinclair	Rod Peterson	July 9, 1960
An acquaintance of Clay and Fran's father comes to Silver City in search of her stepson and both turn out to be outlaws. Featuring Douglas Kennedy.

=== Season 2 (1960–61) ===
No. overall	No. in season	Title	Directed by	Written by	Original release date
40	1	"The Deadly Breed"	Virgil W. Vogel	Clark E. Reynolds	September 24, 1960
Clay discovers that one of two swindlers being investigated by Simon is the daughter of a woman who spurned his love. Featuring Lyle Bettger and Susan Oliver.
41	2	"Meet Sergeant Tasker"	Reginald Le Borg	Richard N. Morgan	October 1, 1960
Clay tries to help a gullible sergeant recover stolen Army funds from a blonde saloon hostess. Featuring Joan O'Brien.
42	3	"The Jason Harris Story"	Tay Garnett	Charles B. Smith	October 8, 1960
Deputy Marshal Jason Harris is apparently involved with a gang robbing gold mines. Featuring Jeff Morrow and Myron Healey.
43	4	"The Fatal Urge"	Tay Garnett	Joseph Carter	October 15, 1960
Clay wonders if the outlaw Simon is pursuing murdered a prominent businessman. Featuring Argentina Brunetti.
44	5	"Mother and Son"	Louis King	Charles R. Marion	October 29, 1960
Simon allows the leader of an outlaw gang to visit his mother. Featuring James Franciscus and Josephine Hutchinson.
45	6	"Bitter Root"	Louis King	Kay Lenard, Jess Carneol	November 5, 1960
A woman hides an injured outlaw from Clay and Sarge. Featuring Virginia Gregg.
46	7	"The Higher Law"	Tay Garnett	William Nash (s), Charles B. Smith (t)	November 12, 1960
An Indian seeks vengeance for being beaten and robbed. Featuring John Larch and H.M. Wynant.
47	8	"Passage to New Orleans"	Louis King	Rik Vollaerts	November 19, 1960
Clay escorts a woman to New Orleans to testify in a murder trial, and Simon tags along when he receives word that the father of the accused has hired men to kill the star witness. Featuring Carl Benton Reid.
48	9	"The World Against Me"	David Butler	Hal Biller, Austin Kalish	November 26, 1960
Clay and Sarge help a boy track down the claim jumpers who murdered his grandfather for a gold mine.
49	10	"Sally Tornado" "Lady for a Hanging"	Louis King	Charles B. Smith	December 3, 1960
A group of bounty hunters takes a woman who's set to be hanged for murder as she's being escorted by Clay. Featuring Fay Spain.
50	11	"The Three Brothers"	Sidney Lanfield	Peggy Shaw, Lou Shaw	December 10, 1960
Three brothers are suspected of murder, while Simon pursues a gang of bank robbers. Featuring Jack Ging and Lew Gallo.
51	12	"Day of Fear"	Tay Garnett	Clark E. Reynolds	December 17, 1960
Clay captures an outlaw with a fever. Featuring Mary Tyler Moore.
52	13	"Second Cousin to the Czar"	Louis King	Kay Lenard, Jess Carneol	December 24, 1960
A Russian duke is convinced to compete against Clay in a horse race.
53	14	"Judas Town"	Frank Arrigo	Hal Biller, Austin Kalish	December 31, 1960
Clay arrests the son of a prominent cattleman for shooting up Silver City. Featuring Ed Nelson and Roy Roberts.
54	15	"Duty Bound"	Herschel Daugherty	Rod Peterson	January 7, 1961
Simon, Clay, Sarge and their prisoners are attacked by Indians.
55	16	"The Lesson"	Frank Arrigo	Kay Lenard, Jess Carneol	January 14, 1961
The schoolteacher of Silver City is visited by her ex-convict husband. Featuring Wanda Hendrix and Harry Lauter.
56	17	"Past and Present"	Tay Garnett	Rudy Makoul	January 21, 1961
A bank clerk is suspected of being in cahoots with a gang of outlaws when he fails to shoot them for killing a miner. Featuring Arthur Franz.
57	18	"The Hard Decision"	David Butler	Peggy Shaw, Lou Shaw	January 28, 1961
A criminal takes Clay hostage to save his brother from being hanged. Featuring Marc Lawrence and Olan Soule.
58	19	"The Dream"	Tay Garnett	Ellis Kadison	February 4, 1961
An engineer starts a chain of events when he diverts the flow of a river from its usual banks to mine for gold. Featuring Dick Foran.
59	20	"Shackled Town"	Tay Garnett	Clark E. Reynolds	February 11, 1961
Clay and Sarge find a town near the Mexican border where a corrupt judge and lawman force the people to mine for pennies.
60	21	"The Lonely Road"	Louis King	William Leicester	February 18, 1961
A paroled man returns to Silver City hoping to reunite with his wife, but she's since moved on to a gun-happy mine foreman. Featuring Constance Ford, Edward Binns and Jim Davis.
61	22	"The Challenger"	Frank Arrigo	Richard N. Morgan	February 25, 1961
Sarge fights a heavyweight champion to earn money so Clay can pay for a relative's medical expenses. Featuring Stafford Repp.
62	23	"Edge of Doubt"	Frank Arrigo	Peggy Shaw, Lou Shaw	March 4, 1961
An outlaw returns to Silver City and is suspected of robbing and murdering his girl's father. Featuring Richard Chamberlain and George Chandler.
63	24	"Two-Way Deal"	Tay Garnett	Roland Kibbee (s), William Yagemann (t)	March 11, 1961
Simon escorts a teenage criminal to trial when the teen's father wounds the marshal helping his son escape. Featuring Billy Gray.
64	25	"The Means and the End"	Tay Garnett	Finlay McDermid	March 18, 1961
Simon and Clay set a trap for an outlaw when his wife is sentenced to be hanged in a bench trial. Featuring Phyllis Love and DeForest Kelley.
65	26	"The Example"	Otto Lang	Ralph Goodman	March 25, 1961
A wanted outlaw is persuaded to convince his son not to follow in his footsteps. Featuring Denver Pyle.
66	27	"Cherchez la Femme"	David Butler	Stuart Jerome	April 1, 1961
Sarge goes on trial for accidentally killing a powerful rancher's son while protecting a woman from his unwanted advances. Featuring Lisa Montell and Edward Platt.
67	28	"Tension Point"	Tay Garnett	Clark E. Reynolds	April 8, 1961
An outlaw gang invades the home of a deceased member. Featuring Virginia Christine and John Marley.
68	29	"Brother in Arms"	David Butler	Edward Lasko	April 15, 1961
A young man who learned to shoot from Clay's father returns to Silver City to face a man he believes murdered his father after cheating him out of his share of a mine. Featuring Lon Chaney Jr. and Denny Miller.
69	30	"The Return of Widow Brown"	Otto Lang	Norman Jacob	April 22, 1961
The widow of an outlaw hanged by a lynch mob is accused of hiding his stolen loot. Featuring Norma Crane.
70	31	"Spoken in Silence"	Tay Garnett	Kay Lenard, Jess Carneol	April 29, 1961
A deaf woman puts herself and her father in danger when she informs Simon about her father agreeing to guide wanted outlaws around the marshal's posse so he can raise money for her surgery. Featuring Sydney Pollack.
71	32	"An Enemy of the Town"	Frank Arrigo	Jerry Sackheim, Curtis Kenyon	May 6, 1961
The by-products of a large tannery in Silver Creek cause the people to get sick. Featuring Whit Bissell.
72	33	"The Legend of Dixie"	Frank Arrigo	Michel Kraike (t), Robert Sabaroff (s)	May 20, 1961
Dixie Miller is mistakenly credited for killing two bank robbers when they were actually killed by their own leader. Featuring Gregory Walcott, Stanley Adams and King Calder.
73	34	"The Deathly Quiet"	Otto Lang	Paul Franklin	May 27, 1961
A pair of Army deserters steals Gatling guns and terrorizes Southern Arizona. Featuring Chubby Johnson and Robert Foulk.
74	35	"Brand of Honesty"	Tay Garnett	Herbert Purdom	June 10, 1961
A trio of ex-convicts is accused of a recent string of hold-ups and robberies. Featuring George Dolenz and Elisha Cook Jr.
75	36	"Lorinda Belle"	Sherry Shourds	Michael Kraike (t), Rik Vollaerts (s/t)	June 24, 1961
A hated mine foreman is poisoned and becomes determined to kill the person responsible. Featuring Claude Akins and Frank Overton.
76	37	"Lawman's Conscience"	Frederick Stephani	Michael Kraike (t), Saul Schwartz (s)	July 1, 1961
A deathbed confession clears a ranch hand convicted of murder, but Clay is compelled to reexamine his case due to a series of robberies. Featuring Russell Johnson.
