= Estella García =

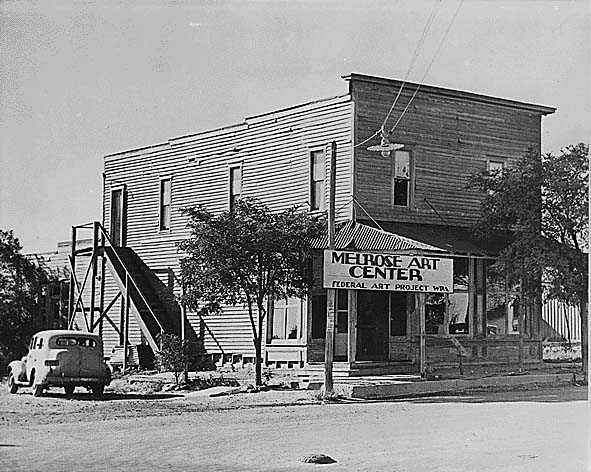
Melrose Art Center

Estella R. Garcia was an American artist who was a part of the Federal Art Project. Garcia was a teacher at the Melrose Federal Art Center in Melrose, New Mexico where she taught colcha, a traditional form of wool embroidery, to both Hispanic and Anglo students. The facility was considered to be located in the smallest town to have such a federal art center. Several of the works that she and her students produced were for the Albuquerque Little Theatre, where they still were in 2001. Her work and that of her students was exhibited at many New Deal art exhibitions around the United States. They also produced a number of theater curtains, including ones at the Albuquerque Little Theater and Melrose High School and Carrie Tingley Hospital in Truth Or Consequences. One such curtain, made for the Albuquerque Community Playhouse was loaned for a WPA exhibition and was never returned.

A ca. 1936 project by Garcia and her Melrose Art Center class can be found in the Museum of International Folk Art at the Museum of New Mexico in Santa Fe.

Images of Garcia can be found in the Smithsonain's Archives of American Art.

In her book Sin Nombre (Spanish for “Nameless”) Nunn postulated that little is known about Garcia and her students because their work was considered to be "craft"” rather than "art" and thus not really worthy of too much attention.
