= Betty Lou Keim =

American actress (1938–2010)

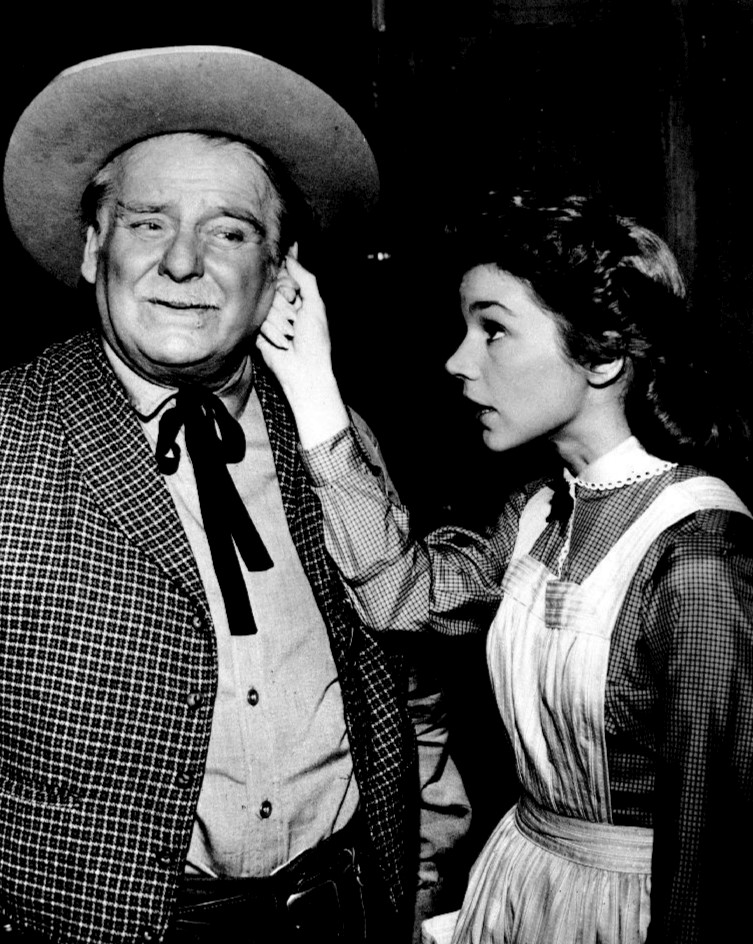
- Keim with Wallace Ford on The Deputy
- Born: September 27, 1938; Malden, Massachusetts, U.S.
- Died: January 27, 2010 (aged 71); Chatsworth, California, U.S.
- Occupation: Actress
- Years active: 1949–1960
- Spouse: Warren Berlinger (m. 1960)
- Children: 4

Betty Lou Keim (September 27, 1938 – January 27, 2010) was an American stage, film, and television actress.

== Early life and career ==
Keim was born in Malden, Massachusetts, as the daughter of a choreographer and a dancer, and she grew up in New York from the age of five. She started getting dance lessons from her father at the age of six and later took voice lessons. Her stage debut followed at age seven under the direction of José Ferrer in Strange Fruit. After several stage parts, she debuted on Broadway, and she became most remembered for playing a mean-spirited girl in the play A Roomful of Roses in 1956. Her other work on Broadway included The Remarkable Mr. Pennypacker (1953), Texas, Li'l Darlin' (1949), and Crime and Punishment (1947).

Keim also acted on television, guest starring in numerous TV series. In 1953, she landed a co-starring role in the short-lived sitcom My Son Jeep.

Three years later, she made her film debut with a role alongside Barbara Stanwyck and James Cagney in These Wilder Years. The same year, she repeated her A Roomful of Roses role in its movie adaptation Teenage Rebel as Ginger Rogers' daughter. In 1957, she had a supporting role in 20th Century Fox's The Wayward Bus. The following year, she appeared in Some Came Running. When not acting, Keim attended the Lodge Tutoring School. Her final acting experience was on The Deputy, in which she starred as Fran McCord from 1959 to 1960.

== Personal life ==
Keim retired from acting in 1960 after marrying actor Warren Berlinger, with whom she had four children. She died at her home in Chatsworth, California, aged 71, from lung cancer. She was interred at Mount Sinai Memorial Park Cemetery.

== Filmography ==
Year	Title	Role	Notes
1956	These Wilder Years	Suzie	
1956	Teenage Rebel	Dorothy 'Dodie' McGowan	
1957	The Wayward Bus	Norma, the counter girl	
1958	Some Came Running	Dawn Hirsh	
