= The Deputy (TV series) =

American Western television series (1959–1961)

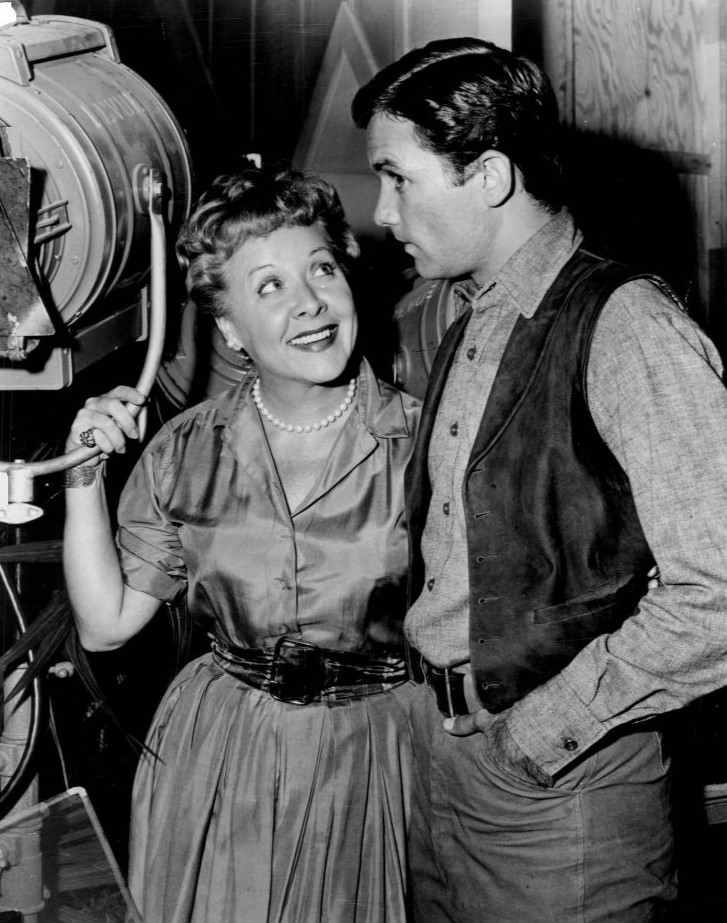
- Allen Case as McCord on the set with guest star Vivian Vance, 1959
- Genre: Western
- Created by: Roland Kibbee; Norman Lear
- Starring: Henry Fonda; Allen Case; Read Morgan; Wallace Ford; Betty Lou Keim
- Narrated by: Henry Fonda
- Theme music composer: Jack Marshall
- Composer: Jack Marshall
- Country of origin: United States
- Original language: English
- No. of seasons: 2
- No. of episodes: 76 (list of episodes)

Production
- Executive producers: Henry Fonda; William Frye
- Camera setup: Single-camera
- Running time: 30 minutes
- Production companies: Top Gun Productions; Revue Studios

Original release
- Network: NBC
- Release: September 12, 1959 – July 1, 1961

The Deputy is an American Western television series starring Henry Fonda and Allen Case that aired on NBC from 1959 to 1961. Fonda portrayed Chief Marshal Simon Fry of the Arizona Territory and Case played Deputy Clay McCord, a storekeeper who tried to avoid using a gun.

== Synopsis ==
Fonda narrated most episodes and appeared briefly at the beginning and ending of most segments. He played the lead in only six episodes in the first season and 13 in the second. Usually, he gave his deputy the assignment, and on rare occasions, thanked him at the conclusion of the episode. As Fred MacMurray did while shooting the sitcom series My Three Sons, Fonda performed all of his work on The Deputy in several lengthy sessions, so as to leave himself free for other projects. Although based in Silver City, the marshal's district also covered several nearby towns. Deputy McCord was a storekeeper who bore arms with great reluctance. Wallace Ford appeared as the elderly marshal, Herk Lamson, with Betty Lou Keim as McCord's sister, Fran, in the first season. Read Morgan joined the show in the second season as Sergeant Hapgood Tasker, known as "Sarge", a one-eyed United States Army cavalry enlisted man stationed in town. Gary Hunley played as Deputy Clay McCord's young brother Brandon McCord in an episode of the television series.

== Cast ==
- Henry Fonda as Chief Marshal Simon Fry
- Allen Case as Deputy Clay McCord
- Read Morgan as Sergeant Hapgood Tasker
- Wallace Ford as Marshal Herk Lamson
- Betty Lou Keim as Fran McCord

=== Recurring cast ===
- Vito Scotti as Jose
- Addison Richards as Doc Landy

== Episodes ==
Season	Episodes	Originally released	
Season	Episodes	First released	Last released
1	39	September 12, 1959	July 9, 1960
2	37	September 24, 1960	July 1, 1961

== Production notes ==
The series was created by Roland Kibbee and Norman Lear, produced by Revue Studios, and featured a jazz guitar score by Jack Marshall. It was the first television series that involved Lear as a creator or executive producer. William Frye was the executive producer, and Michel Kraike was the producer. Kibbee and Lear were the head writers. Kellogg's sponsored alternate weeks. The Deputy aired at 9 pm Eastern on Saturdays.

== Original tie-in novel ==
An original, licensed novel, based on the TV series concept and characters, was issued in paperback by Dell Publishing. The book was titled simply The Deputy, after the series; the author was veteran Western novelist Roe Richmond; the publication date was September, 1960; and the cover illustration, featuring Henry Fonda and Allan Case, was a painting by John Leone. The cover price was 35¢.

Bantam Books reissued the novel in 1986, as a non-tie-in, paperback edition, displaying no stated connection to the TV series whatsoever, under the title The Saga of Simon Fry. The cover price was $2.75. The circumstances behind the reprint are unknown.

== Home media ==
On October 26, 2010, Timeless Media Group released the complete series on DVD in Region 1. The 12-disc set features all 76 episodes of the series.
