= Read Morgan =

American film and television actor (1931–2022)

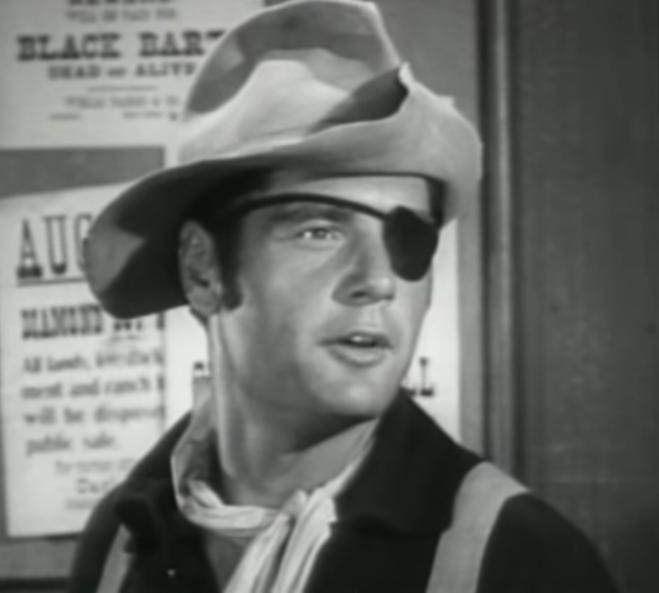
- Morgan in The Deputy, 1961
- Born: Read Lawrence Morgan; January 30, 1931; Chicago, Illinois, U.S.
- Died: April 20, 2022 (aged 91); Los Angeles, California, U.S.
- Education: University of Kentucky; Northwestern University
- Occupations: Film and television actor
- Years active: 1956–1994
- Spouse: Elizabeth Oleyar (m. 1963)

Read Lawrence Morgan (January 30, 1931 – April 20, 2022) was an American film and television actor. He was best known for playing Sergeant Hapgood Tasker in the second season of the American western television series The Deputy.

== Life and career ==
Morgan was born in Chicago, Illinois, the son of Donald and Nina Morgan. He attended the University of Kentucky, where he played college basketball for the Kentucky Wildcats basketball team. He also attended Northwestern University, studying drama. He served in the United States Air Force. He began his screen career in 1956, appearing in the syndicated anthology television series The United States Steel Hour. In 1959, he was cast to star along with John Goddard in the television series Johnny Fletcher; it was not picked up. In the same year, he played as Jeff Peters in an episode of the NBC western television series Tales of Wells Fargo.

Later in his career, in 1960, Morgan starred as army officer Sergeant Hapgood Tasker, whose character was blind in one eye and wore an eye patch, in the second season of the NBC western television series The Deputy, starring along with Henry Fonda and Allen Case. After the series ended in 1961, he guest-starred in numerous television programs including Gunsmoke, Bonanza, Wagon Train, The Restless Gun, M Squad, How the West Was Won, Kolchak: The Night Stalker, The A-Team, Laramie, Wagon Train, Bachelor Father, The Outsider, The Twilight Zone (episode "What You Need"), State Trooper and Paradise. He also appeared in numerous films such as Back to the Future, Nomads, The Adventures of Buckaroo Banzai Across the 8th Dimension, Just Between Friends, The Beach Girls and the Monster, Hostile Guns, East Come, Easy Go, Ask Any Girl, Dillinger, Lightning, the White Stallion and The New Centurions.

Morgan retired from acting in 1994, last appearing in the film Maverick.

== Death ==
Morgan died on April 20, 2022, in Los Angeles, California, at the age of 91.
