= These Wilder Years =

1956 film by Roy Rowland

- Directed by: Roy Rowland
- Screenplay by: Frank Fenton
- Story by: Ralph Wheelwright
- Produced by: Jules Schermer
- Starring: James Cagney; Barbara Stanwyck; Walter Pidgeon
- Cinematography: George J. Folsey
- Edited by: Ben Lewis
- Music by: Jeff Alexander
- Production company: Metro-Goldwyn-Mayer
- Distributed by: Metro-Goldwyn-Mayer
- Release date: August 17, 1956
- Running time: 91 minutes
- Country: United States
- Language: English
- Budget: $1,257,000
- Box office: $877,000

These Wilder Years is a 1956 American drama film directed by Roy Rowland and starring James Cagney, Barbara Stanwyck and Walter Pidgeon. It is the story of a businessman who tries to find the illegitimate son he gave up to an orphanage many years ago. The film marked the first and only onscreen pairing of Hollywood stars Cagney and Stanwyck.

== Plot ==
A Detroit business tycoon, Steve Bradford, tells his board of directors without explanation that he is taking a leave of absence. He travels to his small hometown, where it turns out that his goal is to find a son he put up for adoption 20 years before.

Steve turns to Ann Dempster, who runs an orphanage, explaining how he has achieved success in life, but feels a void left by his absent and unknown son. Ann explains that she is ethically required to conceal the identity of foster children and parents. Steve tries charming her, cajoling, even bribing, to no avail, then brings in his lawyer, James Rayburn, to seek other ways of finding the boy.

Although he has befriended Ann, he betrays her with a charge of fraud, resulting in a courtroom hearing that could cost her both her vocation and reputation. A furious Ann digs up records that prove how Steve specifically expressed no wish to ever see his child 20 years before.

At the orphanage, meantime, he strikes up an acquaintance with a pregnant 16-year-old, Suzie, who has been abandoned by her child's father. Steve takes a personal interest in the girl, particularly after she is injured in an auto accident and needs surgery that she fears could endanger the baby.

With the case dismissed and overcome with guilt, Steve goes bowling. He is approached by a young man named Mark Nelson, who turns out to be his missing son. Nelson claimed he had been following the progress of the trial. They have a heart to heart talk and part with no plans to be in each other's lives. Steve believes that this seemingly coincidental meeting was privately arranged by Ann, out of the goodness of her heart, which turns out to be true. Steve adopts Suzie so she doesn't have to give up her child. Suzie names her son after him.

== Cast ==
- James Cagney as Steve Bradford
- Barbara Stanwyck as Ann Dempster
- Walter Pidgeon as James Rayburn
- Betty Lou Keim as Suzie
- Don Dubbins as Mark
- Edward Andrews as Mr. Spottsford
- Basil Ruysdael as Judge
- Grandon Rhodes as Roy Oliphant
- Will Wright as Old Cab Driver
- Lewis Martin as Dr. Miller
- Dorothy Adams as Aunt Martha
- Dean Jones as Hardware Clerk
- Mary Lawrence as Mrs. Callahan
- Herb Vigran as Traffic Cop
- Michael Landon as Boy in pool hall
- Tom Laughlin as Football player on airplane

== Box office ==
According to MGM records the film earned $572,000 in the US and Canada and $305,000 elsewhere, resulting in a loss of $600,000.

== See also ==
- List of American films of 1956
