= Getting Away from It All =

- Genre: Comedy
- Written by: Roy Kammerman
- Directed by: Lee Philips
- Starring: Larry Hagman; Barbara Feldon; Gary Collins; Jim Backus; Vivian Vance; Burgess Meredith
- Theme music composer: Vic Mizzy
- Country of origin: United States
- Original language: English

Production
- Executive producer: Leon Mirell
- Producers: Howard Felsher; Ira Skutch
- Cinematography: William K. Jurgensen
- Editors: Stanley Frazen; George Jay Nicholson
- Running time: 74 minutes
- Production company: Palomar Pictures

Original release
- Network: ABC
- Release: January 18, 1972

Getting Away from It All is a 1972 American made-for-television comedy film directed by Lee Philips and starring Larry Hagman, Barbara Feldon, Gary Collins, Jim Backus, Vivian Vance, and Burgess Meredith. It was aired on January 18, 1972 in the ABC Movie of the Week space.

== Plot ==
Two New York City couples decide to leave their hectic urban lifestyles and retreat to the country, pursuing imagined bliss by buying and moving to a small, rustic island near Maine. They soon learn that rural living isn't quite what they thought it would be.

== Cast ==
- Larry Hagman as Fred Clark
- Barbara Feldon as Helen Clark
- Gary Collins as Mark Selby
- Jim Backus as Mike Lorimar
- Vivian Vance as May Brodey
- Burgess Meredith as Captain Frank Coffin
- Paul Hartman as Hank, the Postman
- J. Pat O'Malley as Jeremiah
- Melissa Newman as April Brodey
- Randy Quaid as Herbie
- John Qualen as Charlie Erickson
- Hal Smith as Jeb
- Rosalie Williams as Rose Malone
- Charlotte Knight as Sarah
- Jason Wingreen as Eben
- Marjorie Bennett as Madeline Erickson
- Joe E. Ross as Cab Driver
- Allen Jenkins as Doorman
- Dick Wilson as Kirk Lecount
- Bonnie Kammerman as Tourist
- Carol Speed as Town Clerk
- E. J. Peaker as Alice Selby
- Richard W. Kleinhammer as store customer

== Reception ==
Reviewing the film in the present day, Lisa Marie Bowman wrote:

Getting Away From It All is a comedy that deals with a universal theme, the desire to escape from the harshness of everyday life and find a perfect place to which to escape. That said, the film's main reason for existing is a parade of comedic cameos. Jim Backus, Vivian Vance, Joe E. Ross, Burgess Meredith, Paul Hartman, and J. Pat O'Malley all appear in small roles, appearing just long enough for 1972 viewers to say, "Hey, I recognize that person!" The end result is a rather shallow film that has a few chuckle-worthy moments...

In the end, for all of the film's celebration of getting away from it all, it’s hard not to feel that Gary, Mark, Alice, and Helen will all end up back in Manhattan sooner than later. Some people are just city folks.
