= Melrose Junior High/High School =

Public school in Melrose, New Mexico

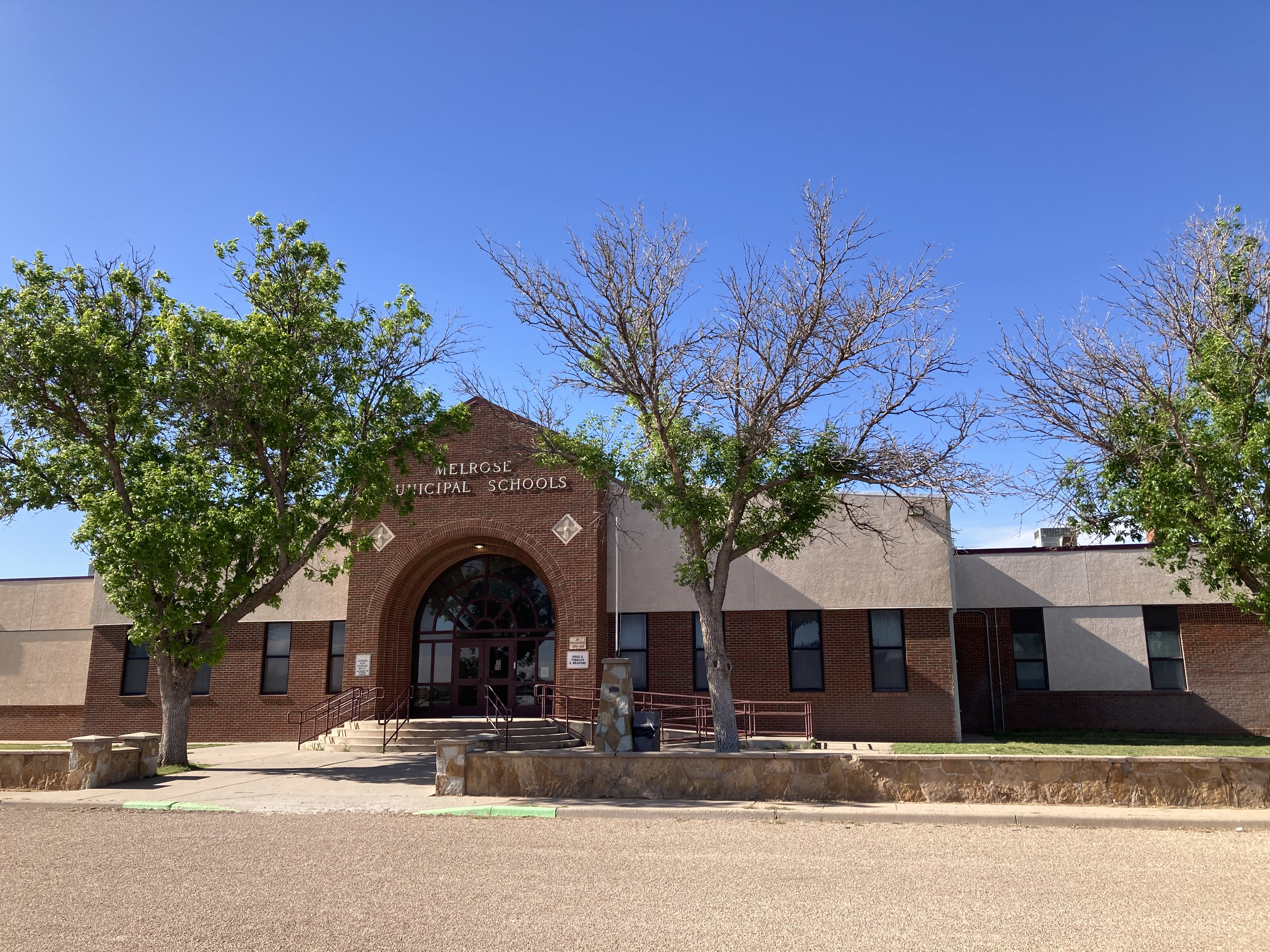
- Melrose Municipal Schools Building, which also houses the schools in Melrose

Location
- 100 Missouri Avenue; Melrose, New Mexico 88124
- Coordinates: 34°26′02″N 103°37′42″W

Information
- Type: Public
- Established: 1925
- Authority: Melrose Municipal Schools
- Grades: 7–12
- Enrollment: 137
- Website: https://www.melroseschools.org/

Melrose Junior High/High School is a combined public school in Melrose, New Mexico. As of 2025, the school serves a combined 137 students from the surrounding area. It is a part of Melrose Municipal Schools.

== History ==
Melrose Junior High/High School was founded in 1925. The building was originally constructed by Henry C. Trost.

== Athletics ==
=== Football ===
Melrose has become one of the powerhouses in eight-man football in New Mexico. They most recently won the eight-man title in 2024, in a season where they went undefeated with a 13–0 record. This was their second consecutive title, after a victory in 2023 over Clayton High School, and the school’s 14th title overall.

In recent years, they also won the eight-man championship in 2016, 2017, and 2019.

== Accolades ==
Melrose Junior High was ranked as one of the ten best middle schools in New Mexico by the Albuquerque Journal in 2024.
