= Teenage Rebel =

1956 film by Edmund Goulding

- Film poster
- Directed by: Edmund Goulding
- Written by: Charles Brackett; Edmund Goulding; Walter Reisch
- Based on: A Roomful of Roses; 1955 play by Edith Sommer
- Produced by: Charles Brackett
- Starring: Ginger Rogers; Michael Rennie; Mildred Natwick
- Cinematography: Joseph MacDonald
- Edited by: William Mace
- Music by: Leigh Harline
- Production company: 20th Century Fox
- Distributed by: 20th Century Fox
- Release date: November 1, 1956
- Running time: 94 minutes
- Country: United States
- Language: English
- Budget: $985,000

Teenage Rebel is a 1956 American drama film directed by Edmund Goulding and starring Ginger Rogers, Michael Rennie and Mildred Natwick. It was nominated for two Academy Awards; Best Costume Design and Best Art Direction (Lyle R. Wheeler, Jack Martin Smith, Walter M. Scott, and Stuart A. Reiss).

The film was an adaptation of the play A Roomful of Roses by Edith Sommer, with Betty Lou Keim and Warren Berlinger reprising their Broadway roles. Teenage Rebel was the first black-and-white CinemaScope film.

== Plot ==
Nancy Fallon (Ginger Rogers) is a divorcee who has trouble communicating with her 15-year-old daughter Dodie (Betty Lou Keim). Left in the custody of her father (Michael Rennie), Dodie feels as though her mother has deserted her.

== Cast ==
- Ginger Rogers as Nancy Fallon
- Michael Rennie as Jay Fallon
- Mildred Natwick as Grace Hewitt
- Rusty Swope as Larry Fallon
- Lili Gentle as Gloria, teenager at the races
- Louise Beavers as Willamay, Fallon's Maid
- Irene Hervey as Helen Sheldon McGowan
- John Stephenson as Eric McGowan, Dodie's Dad
- Betty Lou Keim as Dorothy 'Dodie' McGowan
- Warren Berlinger as Dick Hewitt
- Diane Jergens as Jane Hewitt

== Original play ==
The film was based on a play, A Roomful of Roses, written by Edith Sommer. It was bought for production in 1954 bu Guthrie McClintock and Stanley Gilkek. In June 1955 Patricia Neal agreed to star.

The play premiered on October 17. The New York Times said the acting was "winning" and it was "written with humanity".

Linda Darnell later made her stage debut in a production of the play in Phoenix Arizona.

== Production ==
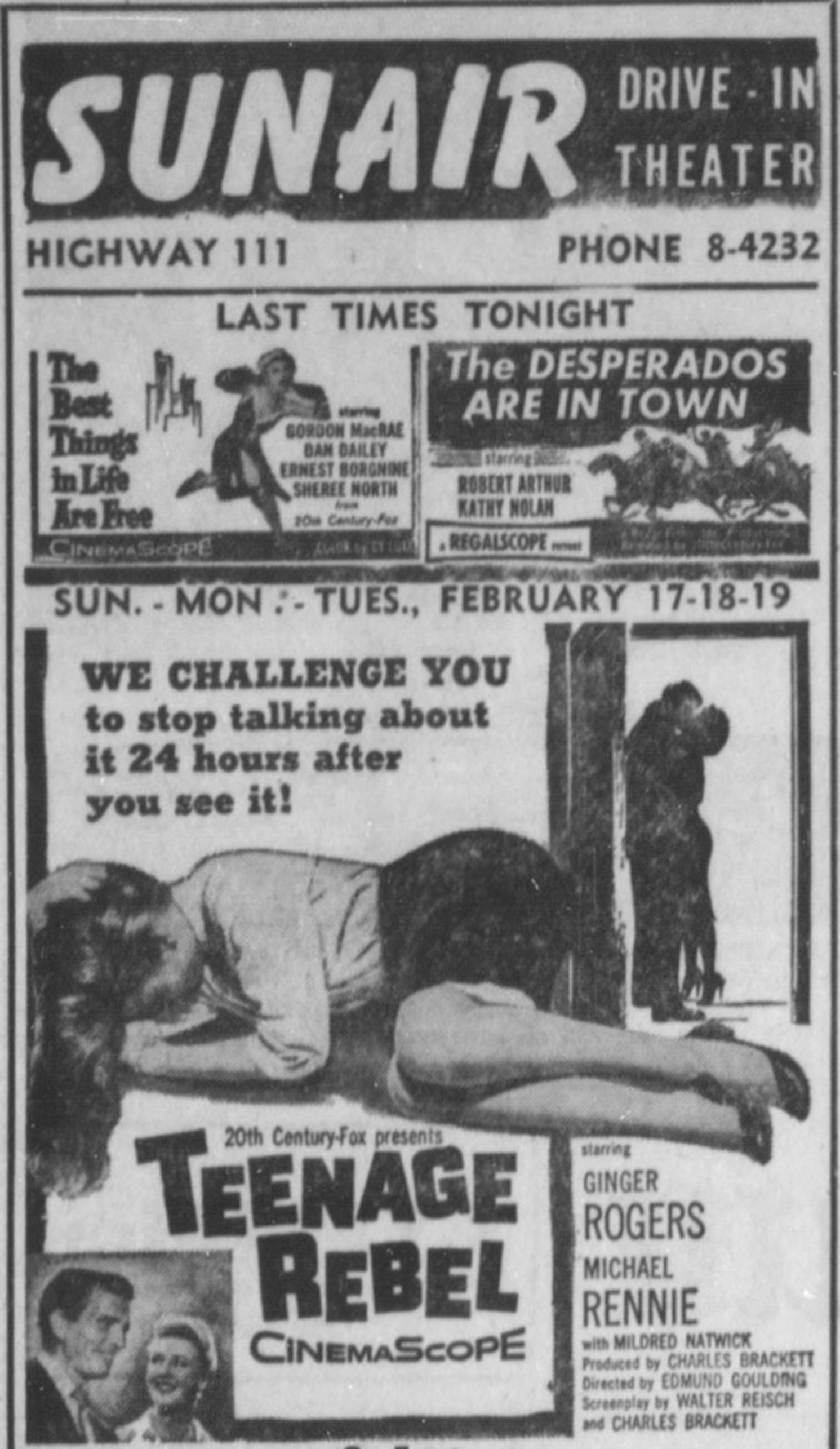
Drive-in advertisement from 1957.

Film rights were purchased by 20th Century Fox before the play was even produced. In May 1955 Darryl F. Zanuck assigned the play to Sam Engel to produce.

According to writer Walter Reisch, 20th Century Fox had a commitment with Ginger Rogers and bought the play as a vehicle for her. Rogers' casting was announced in May 1956.

Reisch later said it was one of his favorite films, saying "It was a beautiful idea: a girl, the daughter of a woman who had meanwhile remarried, comes to the house to meet her new family. [Edmund] Goulding directed it. We only used the nucleus, the germ of the play, and made a lovely picture, a big success. But it was in black-and-white CinemaScope; again we couldn't get the color camera."

The film was known as Our Teenage Daughter and Dodie before Fox settled on Teenage Rebel. In June 1956 Betty Lou Kenim was cast in her stage role. Filming started in June 1956. The movie was the only film being shot on the Fox lot.

== Critical response ==
Bosley Crowther of The New York Times wrote: "Producer-writer Charles Brackett and director Edmund Goulding have well perceived that the heart of the thing is in the contacts between the mother and the child—in the succession of painful face-offs wherein the mother tries to break through. And they have wisely selected two fine players, Ginger Rogers and Betty Lou Keim, for the roles"
