= Melrose, New Mexico =

Melrose
- Village
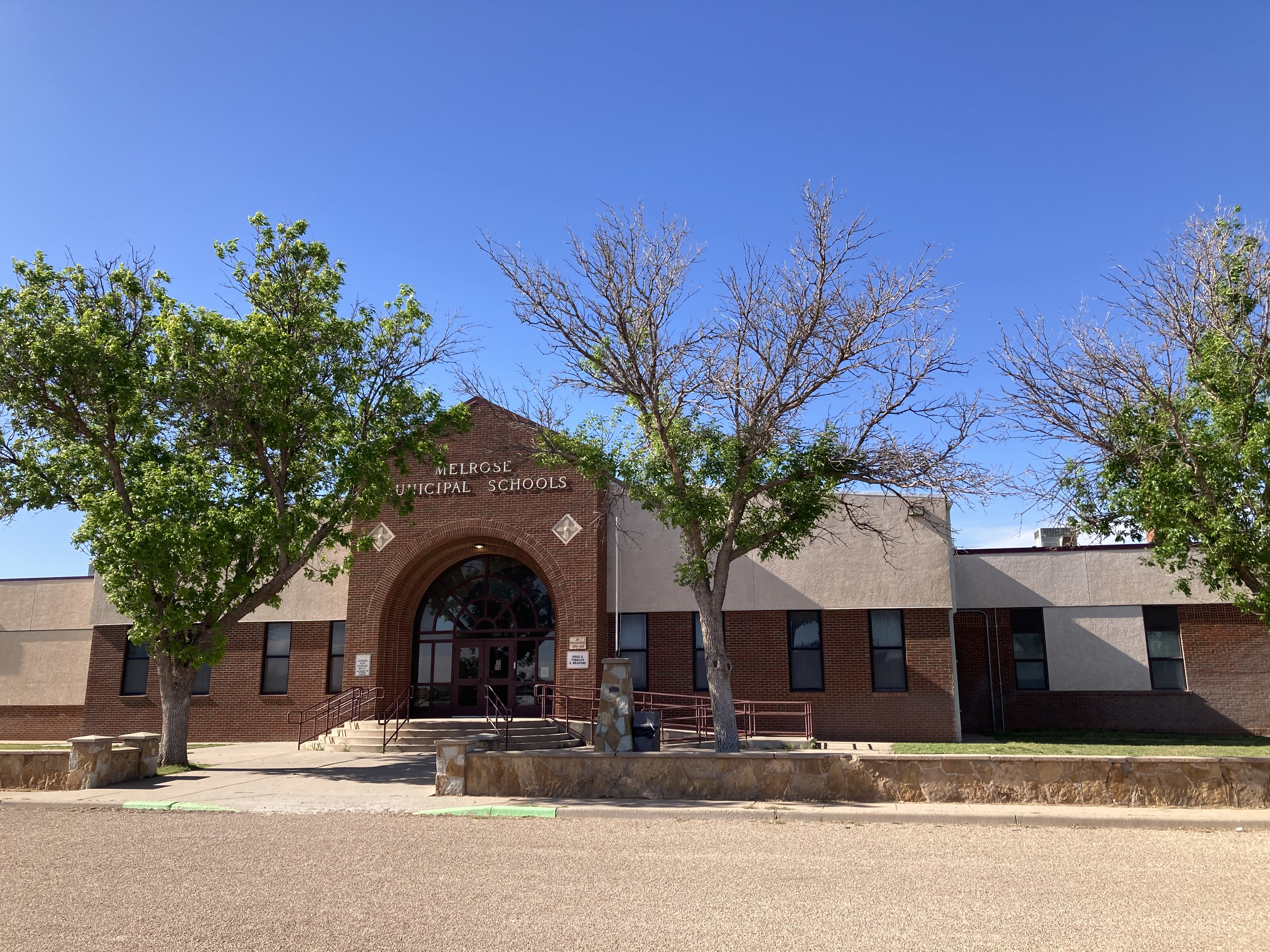
- Melrose Municipal Schools Building in 2025

- Location of Melrose, New Mexico

- Location in the United States
- Coordinates: 34°25′41″N 103°37′41″W
- Country: United States
- State: New Mexico
- County: Curry

Area
  - Total: 1.69 sq mi (4.38 km^{2})
  - Land: 1.69 sq mi (4.38 km^{2})
  - Water: 0 sq mi (0.00 km^{2})
- Elevation: 4,406 ft (1,343 m)

Population (2020)
  - Total: 622
  - Density: 368.0/sq mi (142.09/km^{2})
- Time zone: UTC-7 (Mountain (MST))
  - Summer (DST): UTC-6 (MDT)
- ZIP code: 88124
- Area code: 575
- FIPS code: 35-47570
- GNIS feature ID: 2413572
- Website: villageofmelrosenm.com

Melrose is a village in Curry County, New Mexico, United States. Its population was 622 at the 2020 census. The town is losing population due to rural exodus.

== Geography ==
According to the United States Census Bureau, the village has a total area of 1.7 square miles (4.4 km^{2}), all land.

=== Climate ===
Climate data for Melrose, New Mexico (1991–2020 normals, extremes 1908–2018)
Month	Jan	Feb	Mar	Apr	May	Jun	Jul	Aug	Sep	Oct	Nov	Dec	Year
Record high °F (°C)	79 (26)	84 (29)	93 (34)	96 (36)	103 (39)	112 (44)	107 (42)	106 (41)	103 (39)	96 (36)	86 (30)	77 (25)	112 (44)
Mean daily maximum °F (°C)	54.2 (12.3)	59.2 (15.1)	67.2 (19.6)	75.4 (24.1)	83.6 (28.7)	92.1 (33.4)	93.0 (33.9)	91.3 (32.9)	85.0 (29.4)	74.6 (23.7)	62.5 (16.9)	54.0 (12.2)	74.3 (23.5)
Daily mean °F (°C)	39.7 (4.3)	43.6 (6.4)	50.7 (10.4)	58.2 (14.6)	67.3 (19.6)	76.3 (24.6)	78.7 (25.9)	77.2 (25.1)	70.5 (21.4)	59.5 (15.3)	47.8 (8.8)	39.9 (4.4)	59.1 (15.1)
Mean daily minimum °F (°C)	25.3 (−3.7)	27.9 (−2.3)	34.2 (1.2)	41.1 (5.1)	51.0 (10.6)	60.4 (15.8)	64.3 (17.9)	63.2 (17.3)	56.0 (13.3)	44.3 (6.8)	33.0 (0.6)	25.8 (−3.4)	43.9 (6.6)
Record low °F (°C)	−20 (−29)	−16 (−27)	−3 (−19)	10 (−12)	23 (−5)	38 (3)	44 (7)	45 (7)	30 (−1)	12 (−11)	−1 (−18)	−13 (−25)	−20 (−29)
Average precipitation inches (mm)	0.47 (12)	0.35 (8.9)	0.72 (18)	0.84 (21)	1.58 (40)	1.91 (49)	2.52 (64)	2.75 (70)	2.02 (51)	2.12 (54)	0.41 (10)	0.52 (13)	16.21 (410.9)
Average snowfall inches (cm)	2.8 (7.1)	1.3 (3.3)	1.1 (2.8)	0.7 (1.8)	0.0 (0.0)	0.0 (0.0)	0.0 (0.0)	0.0 (0.0)	0.0 (0.0)	0.5 (1.3)	1.0 (2.5)	3.6 (9.1)	11.0 (28)
Average precipitation days (≥ 0.01 in)	2.6	2.5	2.8	3.1	5.1	6.8	7.1	8.0	5.2	4.3	2.7	2.9	53.1
Average snowy days (≥ 0.1 in)	1.5	0.8	0.5	0.2	0.0	0.0	0.0	0.0	0.0	0.2	0.7	1.5	5.4
Source 1: NOAA
Source 2: xmACIS2

== History ==
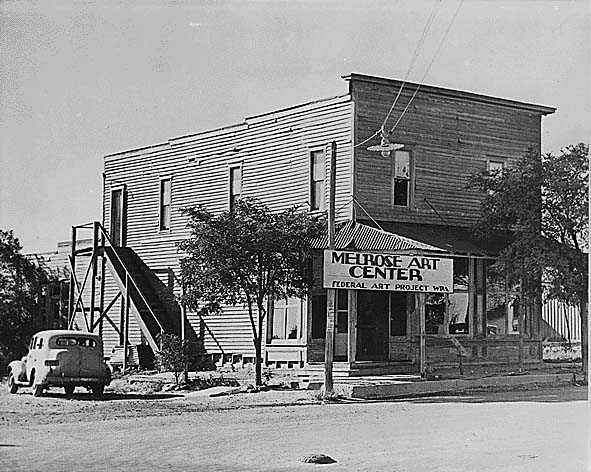
Melrose Art Center

During the New Deal, a series of federal programs were to counteract the woes of the Great Depression, and the Melrose Art Center was established. The facility was considered to be located in the smallest town to have such a federal art center. Estella García was one of the teachers at the Center.

== Demographics ==
Historical population
Census	Pop.	Note	%±
1920	364		—
1930	655		79.9%
1940	851		29.9%
1950	936		10.0%
1960	698		−25.4%
1970	636		−8.9%
1980	649		2.0%
1990	662		2.0%
2000	736		11.2%
2010	651		−11.5%
2020	622		−4.5%
U.S. Decennial Census

As of the census of 2000, 736 people, 309 households, and 200 families were residing in the village. The population density was 427.2 people per mi^{2} (165.2/km^{2}). The 375 housing units averaged 217.7 per mi^{2} (84.2/km^{2}). The racial makeup of the village was 92.12% White, 0.27% African American, 1.49% Native American, 0.68% Asian, 3.53% from other races, and 1.90% from two or more races. Hispanics or Latinos of any race were 11.55% of the population.

Of the 309 households, 28.5% had children under the age of 18 living with them, 54.0% were married couples living together, 9.7% had a female householder with no husband present, and 35.0% were not families. About 33.0% of all households were made up of individuals, and 17.8% had someone living alone who was 65 years of age or older. The average household size was 2.34, and the average family size was 2.99.

In the village, the age distribution was 25.8% under 18, 6.8% from 18 to 24, 22.4% from 25 to 44, 24.7% from 45 to 64, and 20.2% who were 65 or older. The median age was 42 years. For every 100 females, there were 88.2 males. For every 100 females age 18 and over, there were 82.6 males.

The median income for a household in the village was $26,607, and for a family was $31,635. Males had a median income of $24,643 versus $15,667 for females. The per capita income for the village was $13,053. About 16.4% of families and 21.6% of the population were below the poverty line, including 30.4% of those under age 18 and 15.3% of those age 65 or over.

== Education ==
Melrose is a part of Melrose Municipal Schools. The district includes two schools:

- Melrose Elementary School
- Melrose Junior High/High School

== Notable people ==
- Estella García – teacher; worked in Melrose.
- William Hanna (1910–2001) – co-founder of Hanna Barbera Studios; born in Melrose.
