= Melrose Municipal Schools =

School district in Melrose, New Mexico

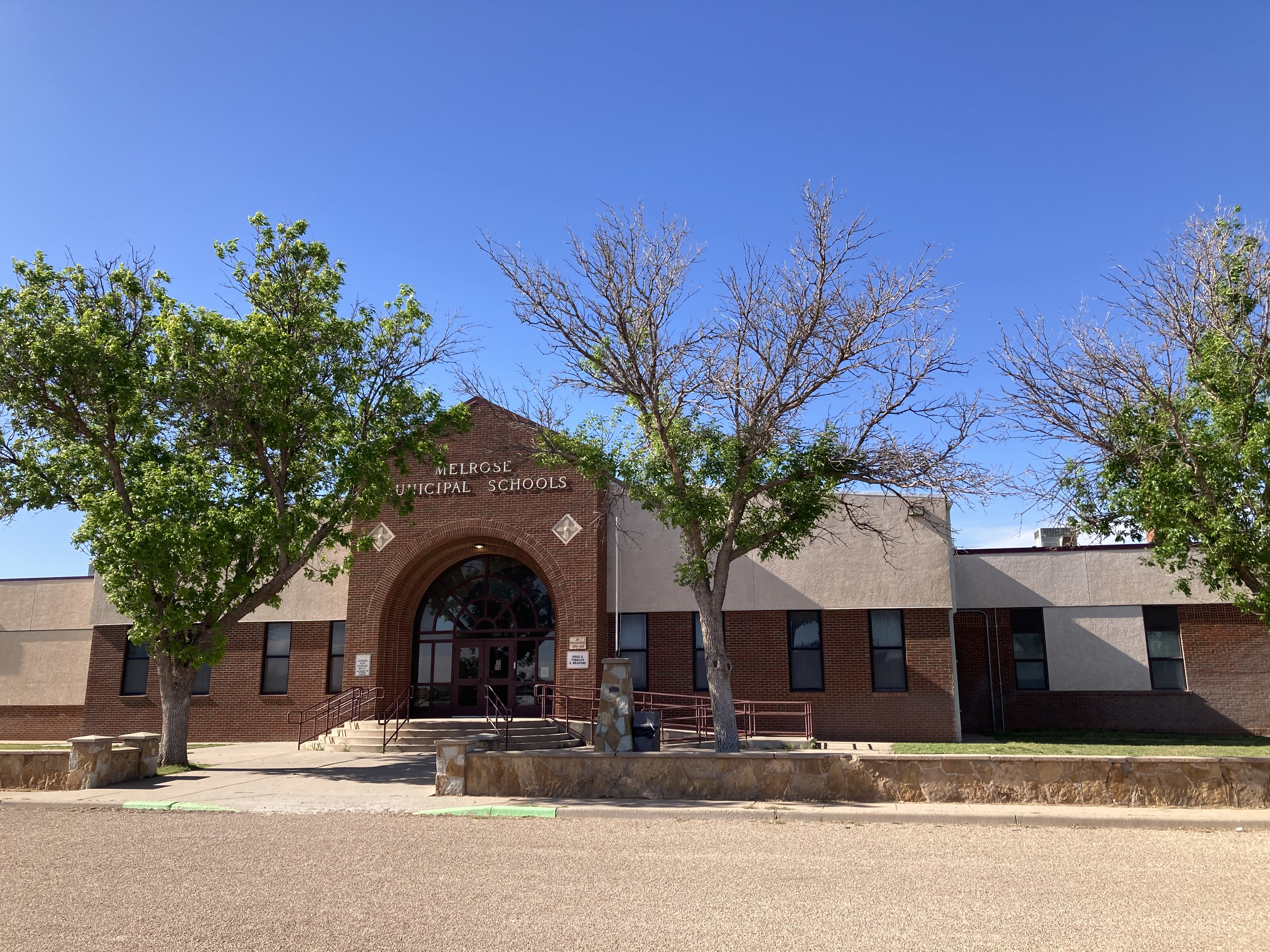
- Melrose Municipal Schools Building
- Melrose, Curry County, New Mexico, 88124

District information
- Superintendent: Brian Stacy

Other information
- Website: www.melroseschools.org

Melrose Municipal Schools is a school district headquartered in Melrose, New Mexico. As of the 2022–23 school year, the district served 295 students.

== Service Area ==
Melrose Municipal Schools serves the village of Melrose and the surrounding area, which also includes parts Roosevelt County and Quay County.

== Schools ==
=== Elementary Schools ===
- Melrose Elementary School

=== Middle & High Schools ===
- Melrose Junior High/High School
