= Warren Berlinger =

American actor (1937–2020)

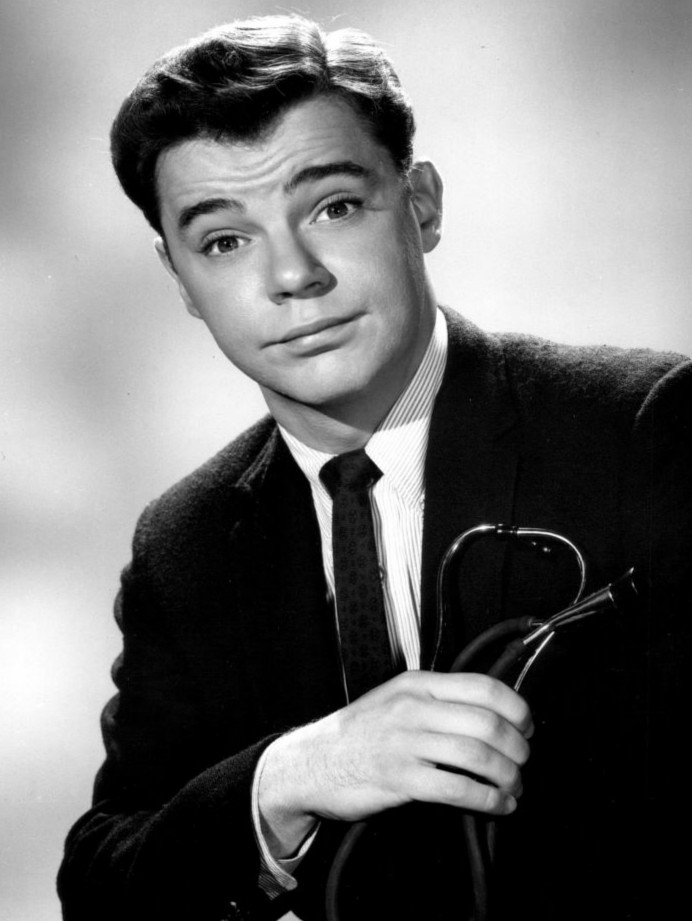
- As Larry Barnes, younger brother of Joey Barnes, in The Joey Bishop Show.
- Born: August 31, 1937; Brooklyn, New York City, New York, U.S.
- Died: December 2, 2020 (aged 83); Valencia, California, U.S.
- Occupation: Actor
- Years active: 1946–2016
- Spouse: Betty Lou Keim (m. 1960; died 2010)
- Children: 4

Warren Berlinger (August 31, 1937 – December 2, 2020) was an American character actor, with Broadway runs, movie and television credits, and much work in commercials.

== Early life ==
Warren Berlinger was born on August 31, 1937, in Brooklyn, New York City, New York, of Jewish heritage, the son of Frieda (née Shapkin) and Elias Berlinger, a building contractor. His family owned Berlinger's Glass Store on Avenue D.

== Career ==
Berlinger appeared in nine Broadway productions across his career, beginning at nine years old with the original 1946 Broadway production of Annie Get Your Gun, with Ethel Merman and Ray Middleton. Notable Broadway roles include young Bibi in The Happy Time (1951), Johnny in Take a Giant Step (1953), the son of Macdonald Carey and Kitty Carlisle in Anniversary Waltz (1954), and Buddy Baker in Neil Simon's first Broadway comedy Come Blow Your Horn in 1961. He co-starred in both the 1958 Broadway stage production and the Hollywood movie adaptation of the drama Blue Denim (winning a Theatre World Award for the stage version). Berlinger played the starring role of the clever window washer J. Pierpont Finch in the 1963 London stage production of Frank Loesser's Pulitzer-Prize winning musical satire How to Succeed in Business Without Really Trying at the Shaftesbury Theatre, which ran for 520 performances.

He began his long TV career as a teenager in live NYC television, and would appear in drama anthologies, TV series, soap operas, and the original Howdy Doody show. He guest-starred on dozens of shows over six decades, most often as the comic friend, relative, co-worker, neighbor, or "average Joe." In 1965, Berlinger was the star of Kilroy, a segment of Walt Disney's Wonderful World of Color. Other memorable portrayals include episodes of Charlie's Angels, Happy Days (including an appearance as "tough-as-nails" United States Army recruiter Sergeant Betchler), That Girl, as Marlo Thomas's stingy cousin Howard (Season 1, Episode 27) and as Dr. Goldfisher (Season 4, Episode 25), Love, American Style, Operation Petticoat, Friends, Columbo and Murder, She Wrote. In 1975, he was a special guest member of the show Emergency! playing the role of heart transplant patient Frank Fenady alongside Jeanne Cooper. He also starred in an Archie Bunker-type sitcom entitled "Warren."

Berlinger had regular and recurring roles on The Joey Bishop Show from 1961-1962, Bracken's World (1969-1970), The Funny Side (1971), A Touch of Grace (1973), Operation Petticoat (1978-1979), Happy Days (1975-1981), Too Close for Comfort (1982-1986), and Shades of LA (1990-1991).

In 1966, he played Phillip Short in the movie Spinout.

As a character actor began in 1956 with the film Teenage Rebel, and continued in the movies Because They're Young (1960), The Wackiest Ship In The Army (1960), Billie (1965) and Thunder Alley (1967).

Berlinger worked with Elvis Presley in the 1966 film musical Spinout.

In 1960, he appeared with Jack Lemmon and Rick Nelson in The Wackiest Ship in the Army as Radioman 2nd class A.J. Sparks.

In 2006, Berlinger marked his 60th anniversary in show business. He was both honorary mayor and honorary sheriff of Chatsworth, California.

His final acting credit was a 2016 episode of Grace and Frankie.

== Personal life and death ==
In 1960, Berlinger married actress Betty Lou Keim, who died in 2010. They had four children.

Berlinger died from cancer on December 2, 2020, at the Henry Mayo Newhall Memorial Hospital in Valencia, California; he was 83.

== Filmography ==
Year	Title	Role	Notes
1956	Teenage Rebel	Dick Hewitt	
1956	Three Brave Men	Harry Goldsmith	
1959	Blue Denim	Ernie	
1960	Because They're Young	Buddy McCalla	
1960	Platinum High School	Crip Hastings	
1960	Startime	Ron Tawley	Episode: "Incident at a Corner"
1960	The Wackiest Ship in the Army	Radioman 2nd Class A.J. Sparks	
1961	All Hands on Deck	Ens. Rudy Rush	
1965	Billie	Mike Benson	
1966	Spinout	Philip Short	
1967	Thunder Alley	Eddie Sands	
1973	The Long Goodbye	Morgan	
1973	The Girl Most Likely To...	Herman Anderson	ABC Movie of the Week
1973	Emergency!	Mr. Winthrop	Season 3, Episode 9: "Inheritance Tax"
1975	Emergency!	Frank Fenady	Season 5, Episode 5: "Heart Transplant Patient"
1975	Lepke	Gurrah Shapiro	
1975	Happy Days	DJ Charlie the Prince	
1975	The Four Deuces	Chico Hamilton - the Arch Rival	
1976	I Will, I Will... for Now	Steve Martin	
1976	Harry and Walter Go to New York	Stage Manager	
1976	The Shaggy D.A.	Dip	
1977	Happy Days	Sergeant Betchler	Season 4, Episode 20: "The Physical"
1978-1979	Operation Petticoat	Chief Engineer Stanley Dobritch	(season 2)
1979	The Magician of Lublin	Herman	
1981	The Cannonball Run	Shakey Finch	
1982	The World According to Garp	Stew Percy	
1986	Free Ride	Dean Stockwell	
1986	Blacke's Magic	Officer Gunther	Episode 12: "Wax Poetic"
1987	Going Bananas	Palermo	
1988	Outlaw Force	Capt. Morgan	
1988	Take Two	Apartment Manager	
1989	Ten Little Indians	Mr. Blore	
1992	Hero	Judge Goines	
1996	That Thing You Do!	Polaroid T.V. Host	
2003	They Call Him Sasquatch	Howard Dell	
