= Allen Case =

Television actor

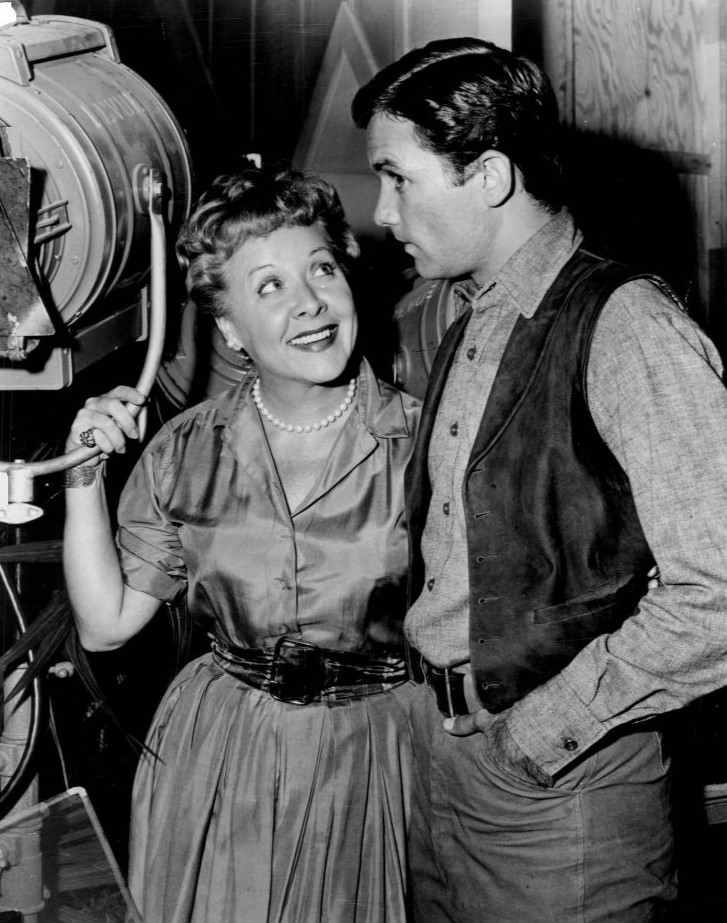
- Case as Deputy Clay McCord, on The Deputy with guest star Vivian Vance (1959).
- Born: Alan Case Lavelle Jones; October 8, 1934; Dallas, Texas, US
- Died: August 25, 1986 (aged 51); Truckee, California, US
- Education: Southern Methodist University
- Occupation: Actor
- Years active: 1958–1982
- Spouse: Bobbie Jones (m. 1961; div. 1979)
- Children: 1

Allen Case (born Alan Case Lavelle Jones, October 8, 1934 – August 25, 1986) was an American television actor most noted for the lead role of Deputy Clay McCord in NBC-TV's The Deputy (1959–1961) opposite series regular Henry Fonda, who received top billing, but appeared far less frequently than Case.

== Early years ==
Case was born in Dallas, Texas. His parents were retail clothiers Casey Jones and Nadine Allen Jones. He attended Southern Methodist University, but left in his junior year.

== Career ==
After he left SMU, Case sang on a television program in Dallas and then toured in musicals. Following those experiences, he traveled to New York City to audition for the Arthur Godfrey's Talent Scouts program.

Case signed a contract with Columbia Records in 1955 and performed on the first studio cast recording of the Gershwins' musical Oh, Kay! He appeared in Reuben, Reuben (opera) which was to be his Broadway debut, though the show closed in Boston during its out-of-town try-out. He also toured with musicals, including South Pacific, Damn Yankees, and My Fair Lady.

In addition to starring in The Deputy, Case was one of the "friends" on Arthur Godfrey and His Friends.

Case made more than 30 television appearances between 1958 and 1982. In 1959 he appeared on Wagon Train's S2 E22 "The Jasper Cato Story" as Jim Collins/ Jack Daly, a thief who's been pursued West from Boston who convinces Brian Donlevy (in the title role) that he's turned his life around. He made three guest appearances on the CBS courtroom drama series Perry Mason, including the role of defendant Adam Conrad in the 1964 episode, "The Case of the Ruinous Road".

In the 1965–1966 season, Case co-starred as Frank James with Christopher Jones in the ABC Western series The Legend of Jesse James. In 1969, Case played Sheriff Pat Garritt in the epiosode "Billy the Kid' in the TV show Time Tunnel.

He made a return to Broadway book musicals in 1967 as the third lead in Jule Styne and Arthur Laurents' Hallelujah, Baby!, and his singing is featured prominently on the original cast album.

Buoyed by his role on The Deputy, Case made personal appearances. In 1961, he came to Shreveport, Louisiana, to appear on KWKH radio and at the rodeo, at which he played Johnny Horton's guitar.

In 1977, Case guest-starred on Quincy, M.E. in the second-season episode, "A Good Smack in the Mouth", as Stuart Harrison, the father of a runaway boy who crosses Quincy's path.

In 1981, Case played Harold Knitzer in The Life and Times of Eddie Roberts, a syndicated television drama.

== Partial television appearances ==
Year	Title	Role	Notes
1959	Lawman	Larry Delong	"Riding Shotgun" (S1E29)
1959	Have Gun - Will Travel	Tad Pike	"Juliet" (S2E20)
1959-1961	The Deputy	Deputy Clay McCord	76 episodes
1962	The Virginian	Sheriff Blade	"West" (S1E10)
1964	Gunsmoke	Lieutenant	"The Promoter" (S9E30)
1966	Gunsmoke	Gabe Baker	"The Good People" (S12E5)
1967	The Time Tunnel	Sheriff Pat Garrett	"Billy The Kid" (S1E22)
1979	"CHiPs"	Councilman Walter Dunlap	"Ride the Whirlwind" (S2E22)

== Business activities ==
In the late 1960s, Case went into business manufacturing fur coats for men. Furs used in the coats included wolf, Norwegian seal, muskrat, and sheared rabbit. Prices ranged from $350 to $1,250.

== Personal life ==
On September 22, 1961, Case married Bobbie Jones. They had a daughter, and they divorced on June 27, 1979.

== Death ==
While on vacation, he died after suffering a heart attack in Truckee, California, at the age of 51.
