= Vivian Vance =

American actress (1909–1979)

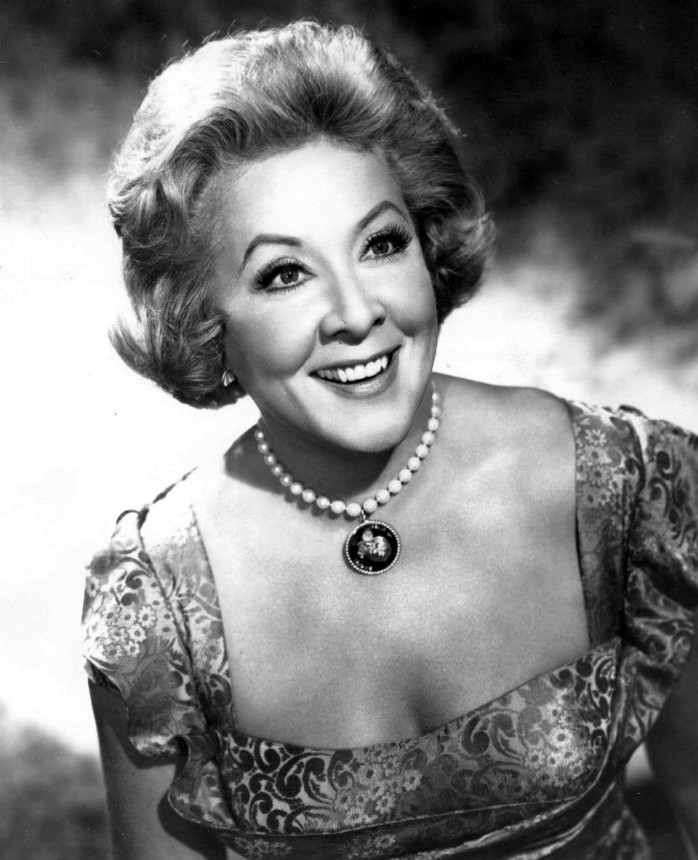
- Vance in 1963
- Born: Vivian Roberta Jones; July 26, 1909; Cherryvale, Kansas, U.S.
- Died: August 17, 1979 (aged 70); Belvedere, California, U.S.
- Occupation: Actress
- Years active: 1925–1978
- Spouses: Joseph Shearer Danneck, Jr. (m. 1928; div. 1931) George Koch (m. 1934; div. 1940) Philip Ober (m. 1941; div. 1959) John Dodds (m. 1961)

Vivian Vance (born Vivian Roberta Jones; July 26, 1909 – August 17, 1979) was an American actress best known for playing landlady Ethel Mertz on the sitcom I Love Lucy (1951–1957), for which she won the 1953 Primetime Emmy Award for Outstanding Supporting Actress, among other accolades. She also starred alongside Lucille Ball in The Lucy Show from 1962 until she left the series at the end of its third season in 1965. In 1991, she posthumously received a star on the Hollywood Walk of Fame. She is most commonly identified as Lucille Ball’s longtime comedic foil from 1951 until her death in 1979.

== Early life ==
Vance was born in Cherryvale, Kansas, the second of six children of Robert Andrew Jones, Sr., and Euphemia Mae (Ragan) Jones. When she was six, her family moved to Independence, Kansas, where she eventually began her dramatic studies at Independence High School with instructor Anna Ingleman. Her love of acting clashed with her mother's strict religious beliefs. "Viv" soon rebelled, often sneaking out of her bedroom and staying out after curfew. She changed her surname to Vance and moved to Albuquerque, New Mexico, to find acting work, performing in the first show upon its opening at the Albuquerque Little Theatre in 1930. She appeared there in many other plays, including This Thing Called Love and The Cradle Song. The local theatre community helped pay her way to New York City to study under Eva Le Gallienne.

== Career ==
=== Broadway ===
Starting in 1932, Vance was in a number of shows on Broadway, usually as a member of the chorus. Eventually, she graduated to supporting parts after understudying Ethel Merman as Reno Sweeney in Anything Goes. (Merman and she would appear together in an episode of The Lucy Show many decades later.)

Vance succeeded Kay Thompson in the musical Hooray for What! (1937). Her most successful stage role was that of Nancy Collister in the Cole Porter musical Let's Face It! (1941), alongside Danny Kaye, Edith Meiser, and Eve Arden for 547 performances.

=== Film ===
Following her appearance in a revival of The Cradle Will Rock in 1947, Vance decided to move to California to pursue other theatre projects and opportunities in film. During her stay in Los Angeles, Vance appeared in two films, as streetwise chambermaid Leah in The Secret Fury (1950) and as Alicia in The Blue Veil (1951). She received several positive notices for her performances, but the films did little else to further her screen career. Following her departure from The Lucy Show at the end of the third season, Vance signed on to appear in a Blake Edwards film, The Great Race (1965); she saw this as an opportunity to restart a movie career, which never really took off. The amusing film was a moderate success, receiving several Academy Award nominations.

=== Television ===
1951–1958: I Love Lucy and success

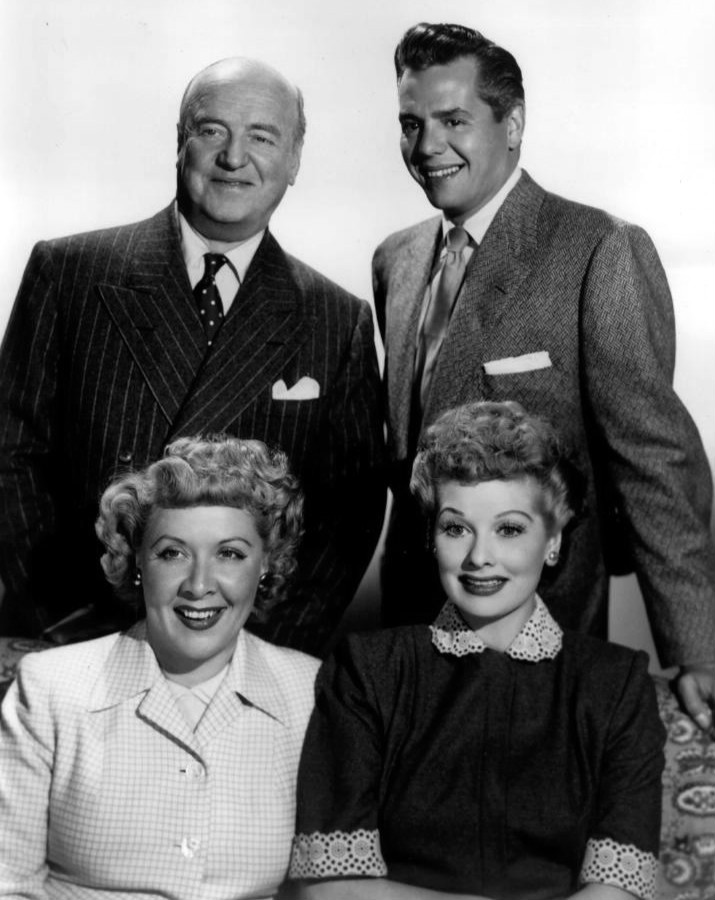
Cast of I Love Lucy: William Frawley, Desi Arnaz; Vivian Vance, Lucille Ball

When Desi Arnaz and Lucille Ball were casting their new television sitcom I Love Lucy in 1951, director Marc Daniels, who had previously worked with Vance in a theater production, suggested her for the role of landlady Ethel Mertz. Lucille Ball had wanted either Bea Benaderet or Barbara Pepper, both close friends, to play the role. CBS refused Pepper on the grounds she had a serious drinking problem, and Benaderet was already playing Blanche Morton on The George Burns and Gracie Allen Show.

Ultimately, the 42-year-old Vance won the role on the new television program, which debuted October 15, 1951, on CBS. Vance's Ethel Mertz character was the landlady of a New York City apartment that her husband Fred and she owned on East 68th Street. The role of Fred Mertz was played by William Frawley, who was actually 22 years her senior. Despite their exceptional chemistry, comedic timing, and musical prowess together onscreen, Vance and Frawley did not get along offscreen. According to some reports, things first went sour when Frawley overheard Vance complaining about his age, stating that he should be playing her father instead of her husband. She used to skim through the script before she memorized her lines to see how many scenes she had with "that stubborn-headed little Irishman."

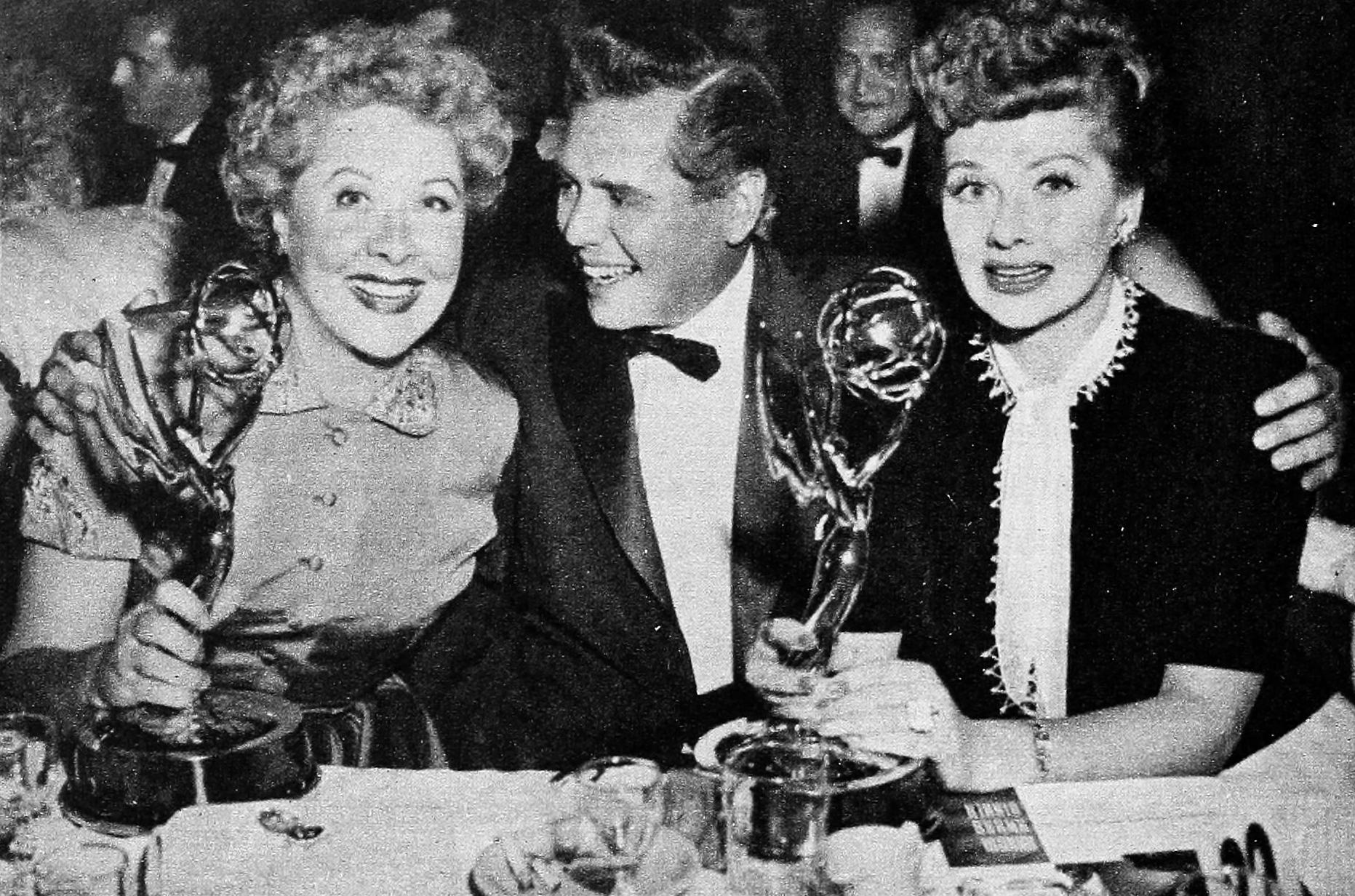
Vance with Arnaz and Ball at the 6th Primetime Emmy Awards after winning the first Emmy for Supporting Actress

Honored for her work in 1953, Vance became the first actress to win an Emmy Award for Outstanding Supporting Actress; she accepted her award at the Emmy ceremony in February 1954. She was nominated an additional three times (for 1954, 1956, and 1957) before the series ended.

In 1957, after the highly successful half-hour I Love Lucy episodes ended, Vance continued playing Ethel Mertz on a series of hour-long specials titled The Lucille Ball-Desi Arnaz Show (later retitled The Lucy-Desi Comedy Hour). When I Love Lucy was reformatted into the hour-long Lucy-Desi shows in 1957, Desi Arnaz offered Vance and Frawley the opportunity to star in their own "Fred and Ethel" spin-off show. Although Frawley was very interested, Vance declined, mainly because she did not want to work on a one-on-one basis with Frawley, as they already had an acrimonious relationship. Also, she felt the Mertz characters would be unsuccessful in a show without the Ricardos. Vance's choice to decline the would-be show intensified the animosity between Frawley and her. Instead, Vance was interested in doing a series based on the life of Babs Hooten, a New York socialite who moves to New Mexico to run a hotel and ranch. Desi Arnaz financed a pilot starring Vance as Hooten titled Guestward, Ho!, which was shot in 1958 by Desilu; however, the show was rejected by CBS and Vance continued playing Ethel Mertz. Arnaz later retooled the show with model and actress Joanne Dru taking the lead role, selling the series to ABC, where it was subsequently cancelled after one season.

1962–1977: The Lucy Show and later works

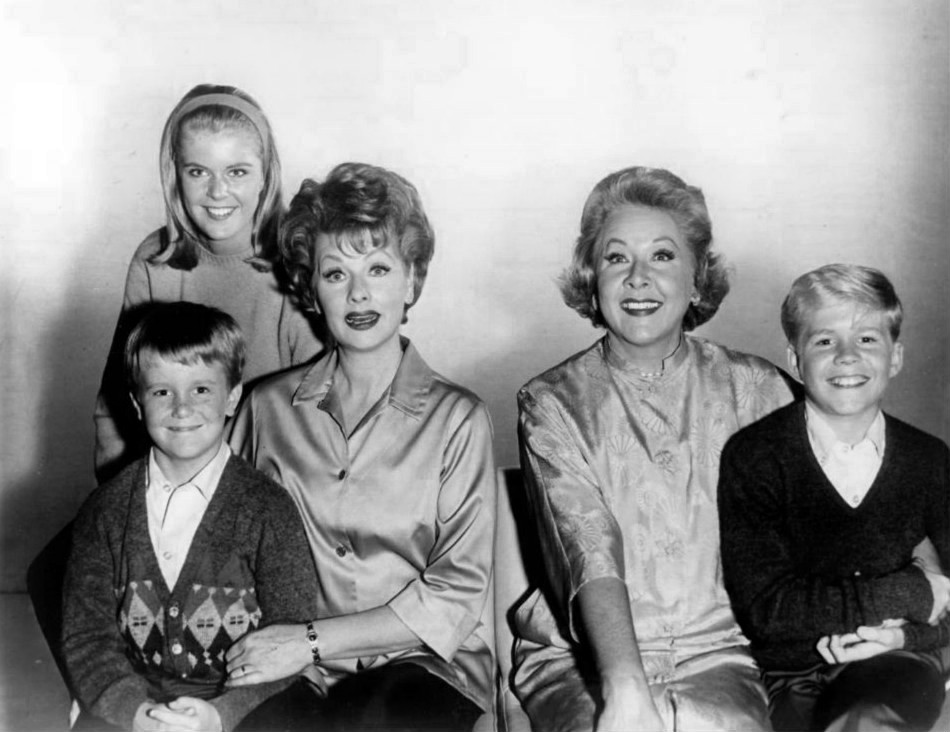
Season-one cast of The Lucy Show: Candy Moore (in back); front, L-R: Jimmy Garrett, Lucille Ball, Vance, and Ralph Hart (1962)

In 1962, Lucille Ball was planning to return to television in a new series, The Lucy Show. The series starred Ball as Lucy Carmichael, a widow with two children living in Danfield, New York. Vance reluctantly agreed to be her co-star on the condition she be allowed to appear in more glamorous clothes and have her character be named "Vivian". By this time in her life, Vance had grown tired of the public addressing her as "Ethel".

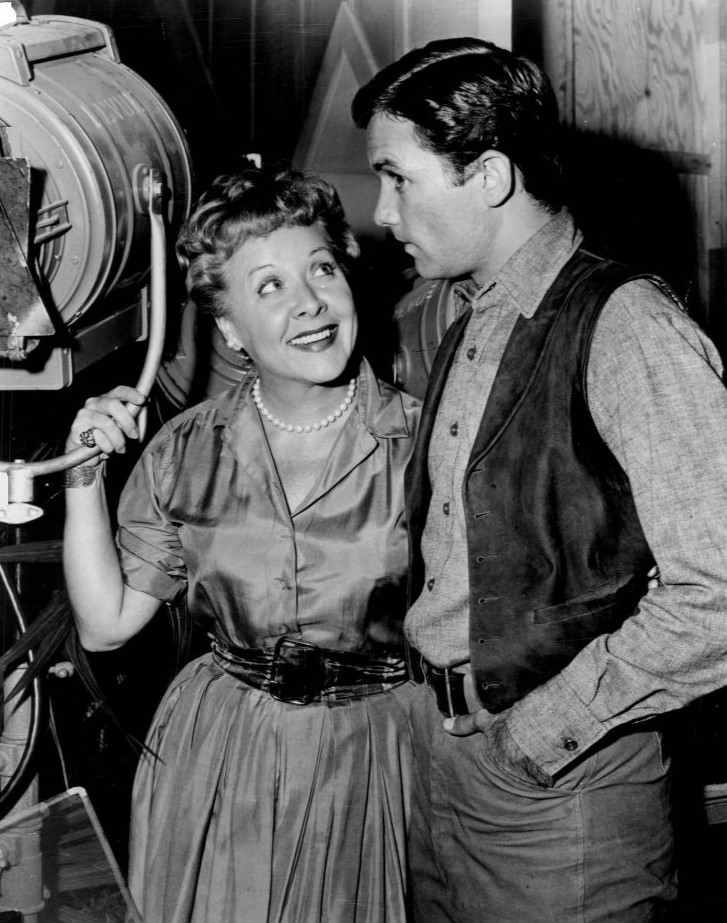
Vance with Allen Case on TV's The Deputy (1959)

After her departure from The Lucy Show, Vance appeared occasionally alongside Ball on reunion shows and made several guest appearances on Ball's third sitcom, Here's Lucy (1968–1974). In 1973, she was diagnosed with breast cancer. During this period, Vance's agent got her an endorsement deal with Maxwell House coffee. Over the next several years, she appeared in numerous commercials for Maxwell House. Vance made a number of TV guest appearances in the 1970s, including a 1975 episode of Rhoda, as well as appearing in a number of made-for-TV movies, including The Front Page (1970), Getting Away from It All (1972), and The Great Houdini (1976). Ball and Vance appeared together one last time in the 1977 CBS special Lucy Calls the President.

== Personal life ==
Vance was married four times; her first three marriages ended in divorce and all four marriages were childless. She was married to her third husband, actor Philip Ober, for 18 years. Ober was rumored to have physically abused Vance because he was envious of her successful career. On January 16, 1961, Vance married literary agent, editor, and publisher John Dodds. They lived in Stamford, Connecticut, then moved to California in 1974, remaining together until Vance's death.

== Death and legacy ==
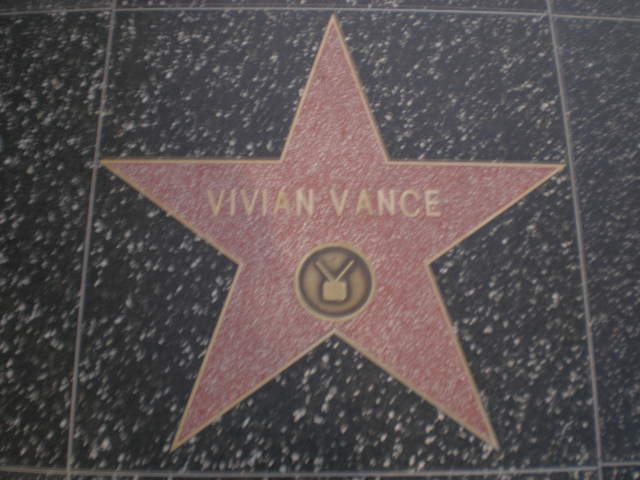
Star on the Hollywood Walk of Fame at 7030 Hollywood Boulevard.

Vance died at age 70 on August 17, 1979, of metastatic breast cancer. After her death, Desi Arnaz said, "It’s bad enough to lose one of the great artists we had the honor and the pleasure to work with, but it’s even harder to reconcile the loss of one of your best friends."

Family members donated Vance's Emmy Award to the Albuquerque Little Theatre after her death. In a 1986 interview, Lucille Ball talked about watching I Love Lucy reruns and her feelings about Vance's performance:

"I find that now I usually spend my time looking at Viv. Viv was sensational. And back then, there were things I had to do—I was in the projection room for some reason—and I just couldn't concentrate on it. But now I can. And I enjoy every move that Viv made. She was something."

For her achievements in the field of television, Vance was posthumously awarded a star on the Hollywood Walk of Fame February 14, 1991, at 7030 Hollywood Boulevard.

Vance is memorialized in the Lucille Ball–Desi Arnaz Center in Jamestown, New York. On January 20, 2010, the San Francisco Chronicle reported a local antique dealer had inherited many of Vance's photos and scrapbooks and a manuscript of her unpublished autobiography when John Dodds died in 1986. Vance and Frawley were both inducted into the Television Academy Hall of Fame in March 2012.

The story of how Vance was hired to play Ethel Mertz is told in I Love Lucy: A Funny Thing Happened on the Way to the Sitcom, a stage comedy that premiered in Los Angeles on July 12, 2018. Written by Gregg Oppenheimer (son of I Love Lucy creator-producer-head writer Jess Oppenheimer), it was recorded before a live audience for a nationwide public radio broadcast, and later, online distribution.

Vance was played by Robin Pearson Rose in the 1991 television movie, Lucy & Desi: Before the Laughter. Thirty years later, she was portrayed by Tony-winning actress Nina Arianda in the biographical film Being the Ricardos (2021).

== Acting credits ==
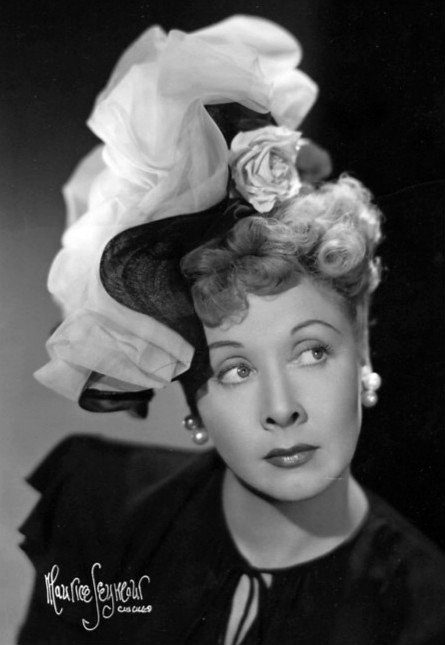
Vance in 1948, in costume for the play Springtime for Henry

=== Film ===
Year	Title	Role	Notes
1926	The Patent Leather Pug		
1933	Take a Chance	Dancehall Girl	Uncredited
1945	Eadie Was a Lady	Lady On The Stairs	Uncredited
1950	The Secret Fury	Leah	
1951	The Blue Veil	Alicia Torgersen	
1953	I Love Lucy: The Movie	Ethel Mertz	Unreleased
1965	The Great Race	Hester Goodbody	

=== Television ===
Year	Title	Role	Notes
1951–1957	I Love Lucy	Ethel Mertz	179 episodes
1954	Texaco Star Theater	Ethel Mertz	Episode - "Episode #6.23"
1955	Shower of Stars	Mrs. Mullins	Episode - "High Pitch"
1957–1960	The Lucy–Desi Comedy Hour	Ethel Mertz	13 episodes
1959	The Deputy	Emma Gant	Episode - "Land Greed"
1960	Guestward, Ho!	Babs	Episode - "The Hootens Buy a Ranch"
1960–1964	The Red Skelton Show	Clara Appleby	5 episodes
1962–1968	The Lucy Show	Vivian Bagley	81 episodes
1967	Off to See the Wizard	Sarah's Mother	Episode - "Rhino"
1968–1972	Here's Lucy	Vivian Jones	6 episodes
1969	Love, American Style	Madame Zimia Zygmundt	Segment: "Love and the Medium"
1970	The Front Page	Mrs. Grant	TV movie
1972	Getting Away from It All	Mary Brodey	ABC Movie of the Week
1972	The Lorax	Singer	TV special, Voice
1975	The Dean Martin Celebrity Roast Season 1	Herself	Episode - "Dean Martin and friends roast Lucille Ball"
1975	Rhoda	Maggie Cummings	Episode - "Friends and Mothers"
1976	The Great Houdini	Minnie (Nurse)	TV movie
1977	Lucy Calls the President	Viv	TV special
1978	Sam		Episode - "Episode #1.6", (final appearance)

=== Theater ===
- Music in the Air (1932)
- Anything Goes (1934)
- Red, Hot and Blue (1936)
- Hooray for What! (1937)
- Kiss the Boys Goodbye (1939)
- Skylark (1939)
- Out From Under (1940)
- Let's Face It! (1941)
- The Voice of the Turtle (1945)
- It Takes Two (1947)
- The Cradle Will Rock (1947)
- Springtime for Henry (1948)
- Here Today (1960)
- Over 21 (1965)
- Don't Drink the Water (1966) (replaced during previews by Kay Medford)
- The Time of the Cuckoo (1966)
- Everybody's Girl (1967)
- Barefoot in the Park (1968)
- My Daughter, Your Son (1969)
- The Marriage-Go-Round (1971)
- Butterflies Are Free (1973)
- Arsenic and Old Lace (1973)
- Light Up the Sky (1973)
- Everybody Loves Opal (1974)
- Harvey (1977)

== Awards and nominations ==
=== Major associations ===
==== Primetime Emmy Awards ====
- Outstanding Supporting Actress — I Love Lucy (Won; 1954)
- Outstanding Supporting Actress — I Love Lucy (Nominated; 1955)
- Outstanding Supporting Actress — I Love Lucy (Nominated; 1957)
- Outstanding Supporting Actress — I Love Lucy (Nominated; 1958)

==== Hollywood Walk of Fame ====
- Star (Posthumously honored; 1991)

=== Other awards ===
==== TV Land Awards ====
- Favorite Cantankerous Couple — I Love Lucy (Nominated, shared with William Frawley; 2004)
- Favorite Second Banana — I Love Lucy (Nominated; 2004)

== See also ==
- List of people from Albuquerque, New Mexico
- List of Primetime Emmy Award winners
