= Albuquerque Little Theatre =

Coordinates: 35°5′28.2″N 106°40′8.3″W

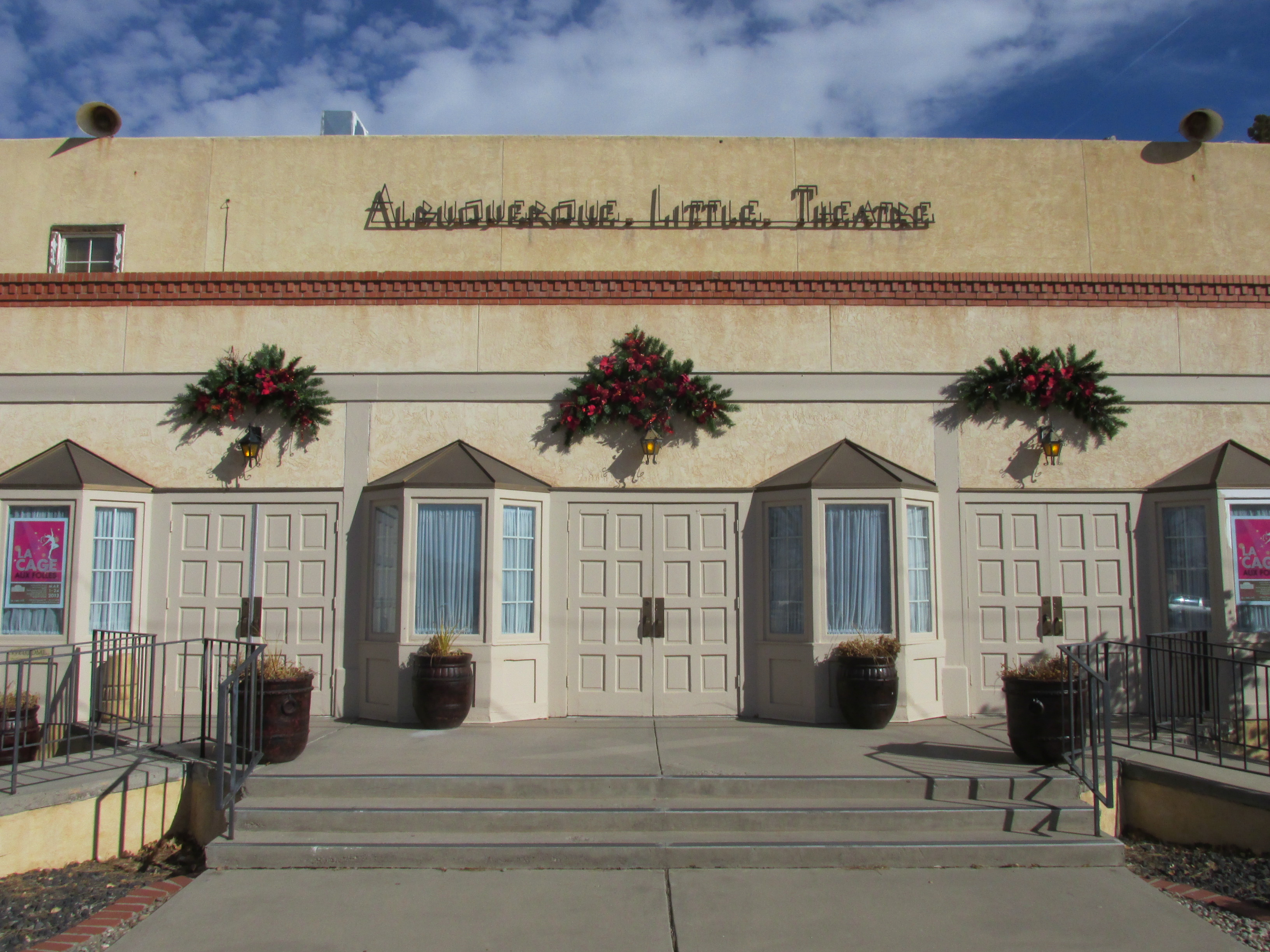
- Albuquerque Little Theatre
- Interactive map of Albuquerque Little Theatre
- Address: Albuquerque, New Mexico

Construction
- Opened: 1930
- Years active: 1930-present

Website
- albuquerquelittletheatre.org

The Albuquerque Little Theatre was founded in 1930 by a group of civic-minded citizens led by Irene Fisher, a reporter and the society editor for the New Mexico Tribune. The idea of a local theatre group was born when Fisher attended a lecture by a professional actress named Kathryn Kennedy O'Connor who moved to New Mexico for health reasons in 1927. Fisher led the campaign to raise an operating budget of $1,000 and O'Connor was hired as the theatre's director. ALT spent its first six years at the KiMo Theatre in downtown Albuquerque.

The company presented its inaugural season in 1931, consisting of the three plays This Thing Called Love by Edwin J. Burke, Cradle Song by Gregorio Martínez Sierra, and Rain by John Colton. Notable performers during the first season included Mel Dinelli, later a successful writer of suspense films, and future I Love Lucy star Vivian Vance. In 1932, ALT staged The Trial of Mary Dugan as a benefit to raise money for Vance to study in New York, helping her begin a successful career on Broadway and television. In 1936, ALT moved into its present home located at 224 San Pasquale SW, just south of the historic Old Town section of Albuquerque. The original building designed by famed southwestern architect, John Gaw Meem, was the first structure in Albuquerque to be built by the Works Progress Administration as part of President Franklin Roosevelt's "New Deal."

O'Connor retired as the theatre's director in 1961 and the board named Bernard Thomas to succeed her as ALT's full-time director. Thomas served as ALT's full-time director from 1961 to 1980. He starred in many of the ALT's productions, including Teahouse of the August Moon and His and Hers. He was married to Reba Thomas, who hosted a daily matinée movie on a local Albuquerque television channel. He also appeared in the motion picture Roughneck. During Thomas's years as director, he brought many popular comedies, and a fair assortment of dramas as well, and he exposed Albuquerque audiences to some unusual fare as well, including the world premiere of David Madden's Cassandra Singing.

Thomas retired from ALT in 1980 after the 50th anniversary season. He was replaced by his technical Director Michael Myers who served as producing director until 1986 when Sandy Brady replaced him, and Carol Fleming was named general manager in 1988. She stayed with ALT until 1996.

In March 1997, Larry D. Parker was named as new executive director of the Albuquerque Little Theatre and continued producing quality theatre through the 2005-06 Season. Henry Avery was the Executive Director from 2008 - 2024.
